= 2004 Charlotte Sting season =

- Head coach: Trudi Lacey
- Arena: Charlotte Coliseum

Results
- Record: 16–18 (.471)
- Place: 5th (Eastern)
- Playoff finish: Did not qualify

The 2004 WNBA season was the eighth season for the Charlotte Sting. The team fell short for the WNBA Playoffs for the first time in four years, falling a game short to the Washington Mystics.

== Offseason ==
=== Dispersal Draft ===
Based on the Sting's 2003 record, they would pick 9th in the Cleveland Rockers dispersal draft. The Sting picked Mery Andrade.

=== WNBA draft ===
| Round | Pick | Player | Nationality | College/School/Team |
| 1 | 3 | Nicole Powell (G/F) | United States | Stanford |
| 2 | 18 | Kelly Mazzante (F) | United States | Penn State |
| 2 | 22 | Jenni Benningfield (F) | United States | Vanderbilt |
| 3 | 35 | Jia Perkins (G) | United States | Texas Tech |

=== Transactions ===
- February 5: The Sting traded Kelly Miller and their 9th pick in the 2004 WNBA Draft to the Fever in exchange for Indiana's 3rd and 18th picks in the 2004 WNBA Draft.
- March 1: The Sting signed Andrea Stinson to a contract extension
- March 12: The Sting signed Olympia Scott-Richardson.
- March 18: The Sting signed Kara Wolters.
- April 5: The Sting signed Sophia Witherspoon.
- April 21: The Sting signed Telisha Quarles, Lenae Williams, Latoya Davis, and Cristina Ciocan.
- April 25: The Sting signed La'Keshia Frett.
- April 27: The Sting waived Lenae Williams.
- April 30: The Sting waived Telisha Quarles.
- May 4: The Sting waived Cristina Ciocan.
- May 6: The Sting waived Latoya Davis and signed Tera Bjorklund.
- May 11: The Sting waived Latoya Turner.
- May 12: The Sting waived Kara Wolters.
- May 17: The Sting waived Sophia Witherspoon and signed Rita Williams.
- May 19: The Sting waived Jenni Benningfield, Rita Williams, Marla Brumfield, and Tera Bjorklund.

== Regular season ==
=== Season standings ===
| Eastern Conference | W | L | PCT | GB | Home | Road | Conf. |
|---|---|---|---|---|---|---|---|
| Connecticut Sun ^{x} | 18 | 16 | .529 | – | 10–7 | 8–9 | 14–6 |
| New York Liberty ^{x} | 18 | 16 | .529 | – | 11–6 | 7–10 | 10–10 |
| Detroit Shock ^{x} | 17 | 17 | .500 | 1.0 | 8–9 | 9–8 | 11–9 |
| Washington Mystics ^{x} | 17 | 17 | .500 | 1.0 | 11–6 | 6–11 | 9–11 |
| Charlotte Sting ^{o} | 16 | 18 | .471 | 2.0 | 10–7 | 6–11 | 8–12 |
| Indiana Fever ^{o} | 15 | 19 | .441 | 3.0 | 10–7 | 5–12 | 8–12 |

=== Season schedule ===
| Date | Opponent | Score | Result | Record |
| 1 | May 21 | Houston | L 53–60 | 0–1 |
| 2 | May 22 | @ Washington | W 71–68 | 1–1 |
| 3 | May 28 | Indiana | W 63–41 | 2–1 |
| 4 | June 1 | New York | L 53–63 | 2–2 |
| 5 | June 3 | @ Connecticut | L 62–71 | 2–3 |
| 6 | June 5 | @ Indiana | L 57–70 | 2–4 |
| 7 | June 9 | @ Los Angeles | L 68–82 | 2–5 |
| 8 | June 11 | @ Phoenix | W 59–51 | 3–5 |
| 9 | June 15 | San Antonio | W 59–57 | 4–5 |
| 10 | June 18 | @ Connecticut | W 63–58 (OT) | 5–5 |
| 11 | June 20 | Los Angeles | W 68–63 (OT) | 6–5 |
| 12 | June 23 | Detroit | L 60–65 | 6–6 |
| 13 | June 26 | Indiana | W 46–37 | 7–6 |
| 14 | July 1 | Phoenix | L 59–71 | 7–7 |
| 15 | July 3 | @ Houston | W 62–55 | 8–7 |
| 16 | July 8 | Seattle | W 70–67 | 9–7 |
| 17 | July 10 | Washington | W 67–65 | 10–7 |
| 18 | July 15 | @ Washington | L 54–68 | 10–8 |
| 19 | July 18 | @ New York | L 58–75 | 10–9 |
| 20 | July 20 | New York | L 74–80 (OT) | 10–10 |
| 21 | July 23 | @ Detroit | L 53–63 | 10–11 |
| 22 | July 24 | Washington | W 70–41 | 11–11 |
| 23 | July 28 | @ Indiana | W 63–53 | 12–11 |
| 24 | July 31 | @ Sacramento | L 61–62 | 12–12 |
| 25 | August 1 | @ Seattle | L 55–87 | 12–13 |
| 26 | September 1 | Connecticut | W 62–55 | 13–13 |
| 27 | September 2 | @ New York | L 52–56 | 13–14 |
| 28 | September 4 | Detroit | L 58–66 | 13–15 |
| 29 | September 8 | @ Minnesota | W 72–68 | 14–15 |
| 30 | September 9 | Sacramento | W 74–69 | 15–15 |
| 31 | September 11 | Minnesota | W 60–50 | 16–15 |
| 32 | September 15 | Connecticut | L 67–81 | 16–16 |
| 33 | September 17 | @ San Antonio | L 65–82 | 16–17 |
| 34 | September 19 | @ Detroit | L 54–68 | 16–18 |

== Player stats ==
| Player | GP | REB | AST | STL | BLK | PTS |
| Allison Feaster | 33 | 84 | 60 | 27 | 6 | 388 |
| Tammy Sutton-Brown | 34 | 211 | 15 | 31 | 71 | 325 |
| Dawn Staley | 34 | 58 | 171 | 43 | 2 | 302 |
| Charlotte Smith-Taylor | 34 | 139 | 40 | 18 | 13 | 280 |
| Tynesha Lewis | 34 | 57 | 44 | 27 | 7 | 246 |
| Andrea Stinson | 34 | 119 | 49 | 27 | 7 | 203 |
| Nicole Powell | 31 | 71 | 16 | 15 | 4 | 132 |
| Kelly Mazzante | 34 | 33 | 9 | 7 | 2 | 79 |
| Olympia Scott-Richardson | 34 | 65 | 10 | 9 | 13 | 73 |
| Teana Miller | 9 | 18 | 0 | 2 | 6 | 35 |
| Mery Andrade | 12 | 4 | 7 | 0 | 1 | 9 |
| Jia Perkins | 4 | 3 | 1 | 3 | 0 | 3 |
| Tera Bjorklund | 4 | 0 | 0 | 0 | 0 | 2 |
