= 2004 WNBA Finals =

Team	Coach	Wins
Seattle Storm	Anne Donovan	2
Connecticut Sun	Mike Thibault	1
- Dates: October 8–12
- MVP: Betty Lennox (Seattle Storm)
- Hall of Famers: Storm: Sue Bird (2025); Lauren Jackson (2021); Sun: Lindsay Whalen (2022); Coaches: Anne Donovan (1995, player)
- Eastern finals: Connecticut defeated New York, 2–0
- Western finals: Seattle defeated Sacramento, 2–1

The 2004 WNBA Finals was the championship series of the 2004 WNBA season, and the conclusion of the season's playoffs. The Seattle Storm, second-seeded champions of the Western Conference, defeated the Connecticut Sun, top-seeded champions of the Eastern Conference, two games to one in a best-of-three series. This was Seattle's first title.

The championship was the first Finals appearance for both franchises.

The Storm had a 20–14 record (.588), good enough to receive home-court advantage over the Sun (18–16).

== Road to the finals ==
Seattle Storm		Connecticut Sun
20–14 (.588); 2nd West, 2nd overall	Regular season	18–16 (.529); 1st East, 3rd overall
Defeated the (3) Minnesota Lynx, 2–0	Conference Semifinals	Defeated the (4) Washington Mystics, 2–1
Defeated the (4) Sacramento Monarchs, 2–1	Conference Finals	Defeated the (2) New York Liberty, 2–0

=== Regular season series ===
The Sun and the Storm split the regular season series:

June 11

Recap

Connecticut Sun 63, Seattle Storm 68

KeyArena, Seattle

September 12

Recap

Seattle Storm 64, Connecticut Sun 71

Mohegan Sun Arena, Connecticut

== Game summaries ==
All times listed below are Eastern Daylight Time.

=== Game 1 ===
ESPN2

October 8
7:00pm

Recap

Seattle Storm 64, Connecticut Sun 68
Scoring by half: 29–35, 33–35
Pts: Lennox 17; Rebs: Edwards, Lennox 8 Asts: Bird 4	Pts: Douglas 18; Rebs: Sales 9 Asts: Whalen 9
Connecticut leads series, 1–0

Mohegan Sun Arena, Connecticut
Attendance: 9,341
Referees:
- Courteau
- Mattingly
- Price

Katie Douglas and the Connecticut Sun took care of business at home to open the WNBA Finals. Douglas overcame an early ankle injury to score 18 points as the Sun held on for a 68–64 victory over the Seattle Storm, taking a 1–0 lead in the best-of-three championship series. The win was Connecticut's fifth straight after opening the postseason with a loss.

Douglas, who suffered a minor ankle sprain in the first half, nailed three 3-pointers and hit a pair of free throws in the closing seconds to finish the scoring.

Wendy Palmer had 16 points and Lindsay Whalen chipped in 11 and a franchise playoff-record nine assists for the Sun, who used a 14–7 run to close the first half to grab a 33–29 lead at intermission.

Connecticut built its edge to 63–47 on a bucket by Asjha Jones with 7:20 remaining and survived a late 16–5 run by the Storm to get a win in its WNBA Finals debut.

Betty Lennox scored 17 points and Lauren Jackson had 16 for Seattle. Lennox nailed a 3-pointer with 17 seconds remaining to pull the Storm to within two points, but they failed to convert their final three shots before the final buzzer.

=== Game 2 ===
ESPN2

October 10
7:00 pm

Recap

Connecticut Sun 65, Seattle Storm 67
Scoring by half: 30–35, 35–32
Pts: Sales 32; Rebs: McWilliams-Franklin 7 Asts: Whalen 7	Pts: Lennox 27; Rebs: Jackson 11; Asts: Sam 3
Series tied, 1–1

KeyArena, Seattle
Attendance: 17,072
Referees:
- Bell
- Napier
- Trammell

Betty Lennox won her shootout with Nykesha Sales and extended the WNBA Finals to a decisive game.

Lennox scored 27 points as the Seattle Storm survived a record-setting performance by Sales and held on for a 67–65 victory over the Connecticut Sun that evened the WNBA Finals at one game each.

Lennox made 11-of-16 shots. She scored 16 points in the second half, when the Sun - who never led - erased a 13-point deficit and tied the game.

Sales, who set a WNBA Finals record with 32 points, sank a jumper that evened it, 57–57, with 5:20 to go. Lennox answered with four points in a 6–0 burst that gave the Storm the lead for good.

Katie Douglas made a 3-pointer to halve the deficit before Lennox made a jumper at the 1:41 mark. Sales had a steal and layup, but Lennox's foul line jumper pushed the lead to 67–62 with 51 seconds remaining.

Sales made a 3-pointer before Lennox missed a jumper and Connecticut forced a jump ball. The Sun gained possession with 3.1 seconds left and ran a play for Sales, who hit the side of the backboard with a potential game-winning 3-pointer from the right corner.

Lauren Jackson had 15 points and 11 rebounds and Sue Bird scored 10 points for the Storm, who improved to 4–0 at home in the postseason. They drew 17,072 to KeyArena for this one.

Douglas scored 14 points for the Sun, who had won five straight playoff games but stumbled early in this one. They fell behind, 22–10, midway through the first half and trailed, 35–30, at halftime.

=== Game 3 ===
ESPN2

October 12
9:00 pm

Recap

Connecticut Sun 60, Seattle Storm 74
Scoring by half: 36–37, 24–37
Pts: Sales 18; Rebs: McWilliams-Franklin, Sales 6 Asts: Douglas, McWilliams-Franklin, Whalen 2	Pts: Lennox 23; Rebs: Jackson 7 Asts: Bird 6
Seattle wins WNBA Finals, 2-1

KeyArena, Seattle
Attendance: 17,072
Referees:
- Corteau
- Gulbeyun
- Mattingly

The Seattle Storm got to the WNBA Finals behind stars Lauren Jackson and Sue Bird. They won their first title behind a player picked off the scrap heap.

Betty Lennox scored 16 of her 23 points in the second half as the Storm won the WNBA championship with a 74–60 triumph over the Connecticut Sun in the decisive third game.

Acquired in the dispersal draft from the defunct Cleveland Rockers, Lennox outshined Jackson, acknowledged as the best player in the world, and Bird, a star point guard. Lennox averaged 22.3 points in the series to earn Most Valuable Player honors.

Jackson collected 13 points and seven rebounds while Bird added eight - all in the second half - and six assists.

Playing in front of their second straight sellout crowd of 17,072, the Storm improved to a perfect 5–0 at KeyArena in the postseason. They won their last two series after losing the opener on the road.

After Nykesha Sales hit two free throws to cut Seattle's lead to 51–46 with 13:05 left, the Storm went on a 13–2 run capped by Lennox's driving layup with 6:15 to go.

Led by center Kamila Vodichkova, who scored 12 of her 14 points in the opening half, Seattle never trailed, opening a 26–14 lead with 10:17 left. Connecticut answered with a 15–3 surge over the next seven minutes to tie the game.

But the Sun went cold in the second half, missing 18 of 23 shots. Shooting guard Katie Douglas characterized the team's poor shooting, finishing 0-of-11 from the floor. She scored just six points after averaging 16 in the first two games.

Seattle coach Anne Donovan made history by becoming the first female coach to guide a team to the WNBA title.

== Awards ==
- 2004 WNBA champion: Seattle Storm
- Finals MVP: Betty Lennox

== Rosters ==
2004 Seattle Storm Finals roster
Players
Coaches

Pos.	No.	Nat.	Name	Height	Weight	From
F	32	(United States)	Barnes, Adia	5' 11" (1.8m)	165 lb (75kg)	Arizona
G	44	(Australia)	Bevilaqua, Tully	5' 7" (1.7m)	140 lb (64kg)	Australia
G	10	(United States)	Bird, Sue	5' 9" (1.75m)	150 lb (68kg)	Connecticut
C	33	(United States)	Burse, Janell	6' 5" (1.96m)	199 lb (90kg)	Tulane
C	4	(United States)	Edwards, Simone	6' 4" (1.93m)	164 lb (74kg)	Iowa
F	50	(United States)	Frierson, Trina (injured)	6' 2" (1.88m)	186 lb (84kg)	Louisiana Tech
G	20	(United States)	Greco, Michelle	5' 9" (1.75m)	145 lb (66kg)	UCLA
F/C	15	(Australia)	Jackson, Lauren	6' 5" (1.96m)	187 lb (85kg)	Australia
G	22	(United States)	Lennox, Betty	5' 8" (1.73m)	143 lb (65kg)	Louisiana Tech
G/F	55	(United States)	Sam, Sheri	6' 0" (1.83m)	160 lb (73kg)	Vanderbilt
F	43	(United States)	Thompson, Alicia	6' 1" (1.85m)	180 lb (82kg)	Texas Tech
F/C	7	(Czech Republic)	Vodichkova, Kamila	6' 4" (1.93m)	185 lb (84kg)	Czech Republic

Head coach
(United States) Anne Donovan (Old Dominion)
Assistant coaches
(United States) Jenny Boucek (Virginia)
(United States) Jessie Kenlaw (Savannah State)
Athletic trainer
(United States) Annmarie Henkel (George Washington)

Legend

- (C) Team captain
- (DP) Unsigned draft pick
- (FA) Free agent
- (S) Suspended
- Injured

2004 Connecticut Sun Finals roster
Players
Coaches

Pos.	No.	Nat.	Name	Height	Weight	From
G	24	(United States)	Black, Debbie	5' 3" (1.6m)	124 lb (56kg)	Saint Joseph's
F	22	(United States)	Brungo, Jessica	6' 1" (1.85m)	165 lb (75kg)	Penn State
G	34	(United States)	Derevjanik, Jennifer	5' 10" (1.78m)	140 lb (64kg)	George Mason
G/F	32	(United States)	Douglas, Katie	6' 0" (1.83m)	165 lb (75kg)	Purdue
G	12	(United States)	Futrell, Candace	5' 6" (1.68m)	135 lb (61kg)	Texas
C	12	(Poland)	Dydek, Margo	7' 2" (2.18m)	223 lb (101kg)	Poland
F	15	(United States)	Jones, Asjha	6' 2" (1.88m)	196 lb (89kg)	Connecticut
F/C	11	(United States)	McWilliams-Franklin, Taj	6' 2" (1.88m)	184 lb (83kg)	St. Edward's College
F	3	(United States)	Palmer, Wendy	6' 2" (1.88m)	165 lb (75kg)	Virginia
G/F	42	(United States)	Sales, Nykesha	6' 0" (1.83m)	175 lb (79kg)	Connecticut
G	13	(United States)	Whalen, Lindsay	5' 8" (1.73m)	150 lb (68kg)	Minnesota
F	43	(United States)	Willingham, Le'Coe	6' 0" (1.83m)	200 lb (91kg)	Auburn
F	21	(United States)	Wyckoff, Brooke (injured)	6' 1" (1.85m)	183 lb (83kg)	Florida State

Head coach
(United States) Mike Thibault (Saint Martin's)
Assistant coaches
(United States) Scott Hawk (Nebraska-Omaha)
(United States) Bernadette Mattox (Georgia)
Athletic trainer
(United States) Jen Brodeur
Strength and conditioning coach
(United States) Lisa Ciaravella (Lynn)

Legend

- (C) Team captain
- (DP) Unsigned draft pick
- (FA) Free agent
- (S) Suspended
- Injured
