= WNBA Finals =

Championship series of the Women's National Basketball Association

- The WNBA Finals logo used until 2018

Tournament information
- Sport: Basketball
- Established: 1997
- Administrator: Women's National Basketball Association
- Format: Best-of-seven series
- Teams: 2
- Defending champions: Golden State Valkyries (1st title)
- Most championships: Houston Comets; Minnesota Lynx; Seattle Storm (4 titles)
- Broadcast: ABC/ESPN 2027, 2029, 2031, 2033, 2035, 2037; NBC/USA Network 2026, 2030, 2034; Amazon Prime Video 2028, 2032, 2036

Most recent tournament
- 2026 WNBA Finals

The WNBA Finals is the championship series of the Women's National Basketball Association (WNBA) and the conclusion of the league's postseason each fall. The series was named the WNBA Championship until 2002.

The series is played between the winners of the playoff semifinals. At the conclusion of the championship round, the winner of the WNBA Finals is presented the championship trophy. The WNBA Finals has been played at the conclusion of every WNBA season in history, the first being held in 1997.

From 2005 to 2024, the winner of the WNBA Finals was determined through a 2–2–1 format. The first, second, and fifth games of the series were played at the arena of the team who earned home court advantage by having the better record during the regular season. Beginning in 2025, the Finals switched to a best-of-seven series with a 2–2–1–1–1 format similar to the NBA Finals.

== History ==
The WNBA's playoff format has changed several times in the league's history. In 1997, a single championship game was held to decide the champion. In 1998, after the addition of two teams, the WNBA finals were turned into a best-of-three series. The finale series was known as the WNBA Championship from 1997 to 2001, before changing to WNBA Finals to reflect its NBA counterpart. In 2005, the WNBA Finals adopted a best-of-five format. In 2016, the WNBA began seeding teams #1 through #8 regardless of conference making it possible for two Eastern Conference or two Western Conference teams to meet in the Finals. In 2025, the WNBA Finals became a best-of-seven series and a homecourt system of 2–2–1–1–1 similar to the NBA Finals, in which the higher seed will host Games 1, 2, 5 and 7, and its opponent will host Games 3, 4 and 6, the final three, if necessary.

== Map of champions ==
Location of WNBA Champions # titles: 1-white 2-blue 3-green 4-yellow *denotes defunct team

== Results ==
Year	Champions		Result	Runners-up		Finals MVP	TV
Year	Team	Coach	Result	Team	Coach	Finals MVP	TV
1997	Houston Comets (Note: Due to the WNBA's playoff structure in 1997, two Eastern Conference teams met in the championship game)	Van Chancellor	1–0	New York Liberty	Nancy Darsch	Cynthia Cooper	NBC
1998	Houston Comets (Note: Due to the WNBA's playoff structure in 1998, two Western Conference teams met in the championship series) (2)	Van Chancellor (2)	2–1	Phoenix Mercury	Cheryl Miller	Cynthia Cooper (2)	Game 1 and 3: ESPN; Game 2: NBC
1999	Houston Comets (3)	Van Chancellor (3)	2–1	New York Liberty	Richie Adubato	Cynthia Cooper (3)	Game 1: Lifetime; Game 2 and 3: NBC
2000	Houston Comets (4)	Van Chancellor (4)	2–0	New York Liberty	Richie Adubato	Cynthia Cooper (4)	Game 1: Lifetime; Game 2: NBC
2001	Los Angeles Sparks	Michael Cooper	2–0	Charlotte Sting	Anne Donovan	Lisa Leslie	Game 1: ESPN; Game 2: NBC
2002	Los Angeles Sparks (2)	Michael Cooper (2)	2–0	New York Liberty	Richie Adubato	Lisa Leslie (2)	Game 1: ESPN; Game 2: NBC
2003	Detroit Shock	Bill Laimbeer	2–1	Los Angeles Sparks	Michael Cooper	Ruth Riley	ESPN2
2004	Seattle Storm	Anne Donovan	2–1	Connecticut Sun	Mike Thibault	Betty Lennox	ESPN2
2005	Sacramento Monarchs	John Whisenant	3–1	Connecticut Sun	Mike Thibault	Yolanda Griffith	Game 1, 2 and 4: ESPN2; Game 3: ABC
2006	Detroit Shock (2)	Bill Laimbeer (2)	3–2	Sacramento Monarchs	John Whisenant	Deanna Nolan	ESPN2
2007	Phoenix Mercury	Paul Westhead	3–2	Detroit Shock	Bill Laimbeer	Cappie Pondexter	ESPN2
2008	Detroit Shock (3)	Bill Laimbeer (3)	3–0	San Antonio Silver Stars	Dan Hughes	Katie Smith	ESPN2
2009	Phoenix Mercury (2)	Corey Gaines	3–2	Indiana Fever	Lin Dunn	Diana Taurasi	ESPN2
2010	Seattle Storm (2)	Brian Agler	3–0	Atlanta Dream	Marynell Meadors	Lauren Jackson	Game 1: ABC; Game 2 and 3: ESPN2
2011	Minnesota Lynx	Cheryl Reeve	3–0	Atlanta Dream	Marynell Meadors	Seimone Augustus	Game 1: ESPN; Game 2 and 3: ESPN2
2012	Indiana Fever	Lin Dunn	3–1	Minnesota Lynx	Cheryl Reeve	Tamika Catchings	Game 1, 3 and 4: ESPN2; Game 2: ESPN
2013	Minnesota Lynx (2)	Cheryl Reeve (2)	3–0	Atlanta Dream	Fred Williams	Maya Moore	Game 1: ESPN; Game 2 and 3: ESPN2
2014	Phoenix Mercury (3)	Sandy Brondello	3–0	Chicago Sky	Pokey Chatman	Diana Taurasi (2)	Game 1: ABC; Game 2: ESPN; Game 3: ESPN2
2015	Minnesota Lynx (3)	Cheryl Reeve (3)	3–2	Indiana Fever	Stephanie White	Sylvia Fowles	Game 1: ABC; Game 2, 3 and 5: ESPN2; Game 4: ESPN
2016	Los Angeles Sparks (Note: Due to the WNBA's playoff structure in 2016, two Western Conference teams met in the Finals.) (3)	Brian Agler (2)	3–2	Minnesota Lynx	Cheryl Reeve	Candace Parker	Game 1: ABC; Game 2, 4 and 5: ESPN; Game 3: ESPN2
2017	Minnesota Lynx (Note: Due to the WNBA's playoff structure in 2017, two Western Conference teams met in the Finals.) (4)	Cheryl Reeve (4)	3–2	Los Angeles Sparks	Brian Agler	Sylvia Fowles (2)	Game 1: ABC; Game 2 and 3: ESPN2; Game 4 and 5: ESPN
2018	Seattle Storm (3)	Dan Hughes	3–0	Washington Mystics	Mike Thibault	Breanna Stewart	Game 1: ESPNews; Game 2: ABC; Game 3: ESPN2
2019	Washington Mystics (Note: Due to the WNBA's playoff structure in 2019, two Eastern Conference teams met in the Finals.)	Mike Thibault	3–2	Connecticut Sun	Curt Miller	Emma Meesseman	Game 1 and 2: ESPN; Game 3: ABC; Game 4 and 5: ESPN2
2020	Seattle Storm (Note: Due to the WNBA's playoff structure in 2020, two Western Conference teams met in the Finals.) (4)	Gary Kloppenburg	3–0	Las Vegas Aces	Bill Laimbeer	Breanna Stewart (2)	Game 1: ESPN2; Game 2: ABC; Game 3: ESPN
2021	Chicago Sky	James Wade	3–1	Phoenix Mercury	Sandy Brondello	Kahleah Copper	Game 1: ABC; Game 2 and 4: ESPN; Game 3: ESPN2
2022	Las Vegas Aces	Becky Hammon	3–1	Connecticut Sun	Curt Miller	Chelsea Gray	Game 1: ABC; Game 2–4: ESPN
2023	Las Vegas Aces (2)	Becky Hammon (2)	3–1	New York Liberty	Sandy Brondello	A'ja Wilson	Game 1 and 3: ABC; Game 2 and 4: ESPN
2024	New York Liberty	Sandy Brondello (2)	3–2	Minnesota Lynx	Cheryl Reeve	Jonquel Jones	Games 1, 3–5: ESPN; Game 2: ABC
2025	Las Vegas Aces (Note: Due to the WNBA's playoff structure in 2025, two Western Conference teams met in the Finals.) (3)	Becky Hammon (3)	4–0	Phoenix Mercury	Nate Tibbetts	A'ja Wilson (2)	Games 1, 3 and 4: ESPN; Game 2: ABC
2026	Golden State Valkyries	Natalie Nakase	4–3	Atlanta Dream	Karl Smesko	Gabby Williams	Games 1 and 4: NBC; Games 2, 3, 5, 6, 7 USA Network

=== Highlights ===
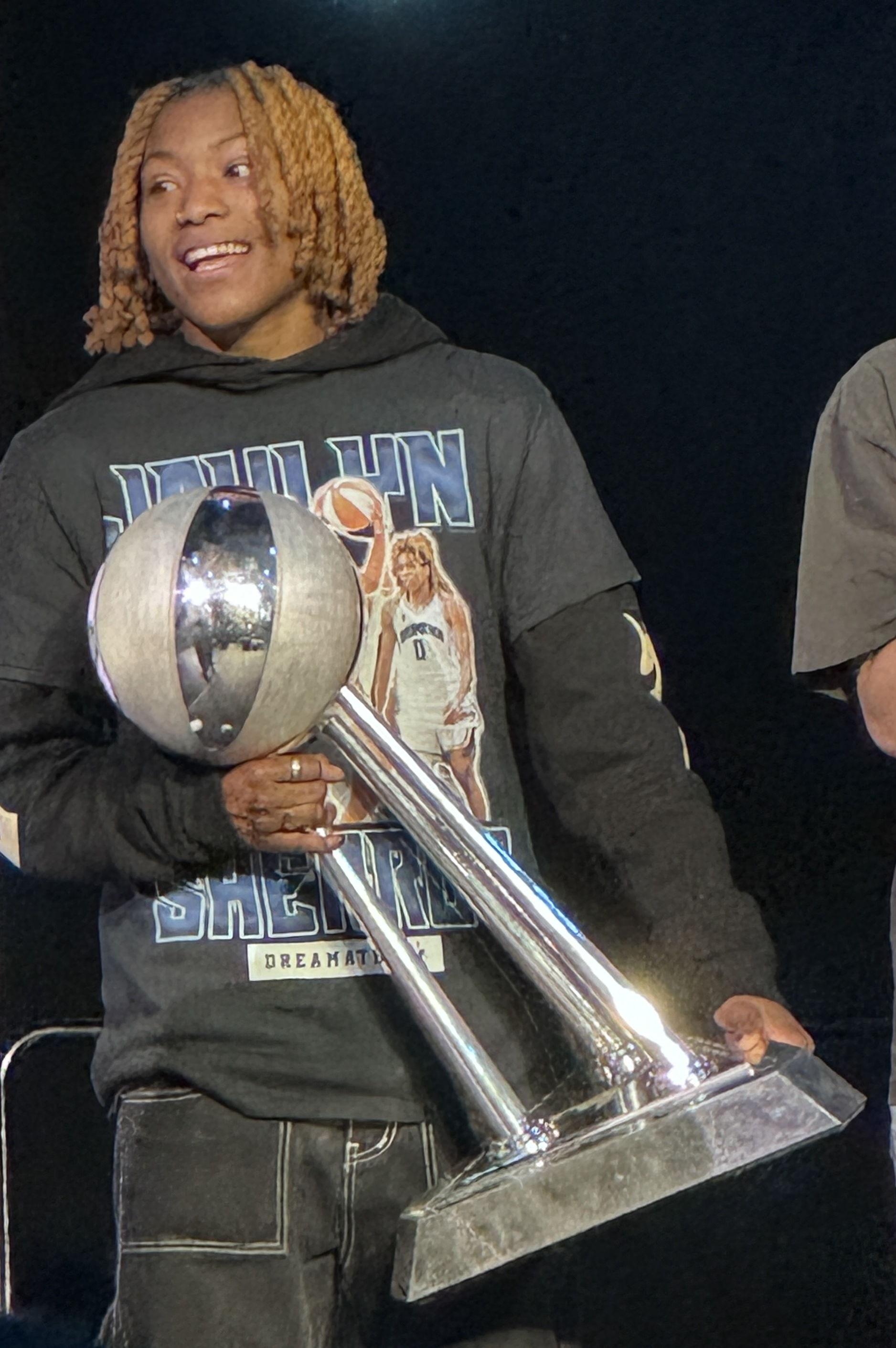
Jaylyn Sherrod with the 2024 WNBA Finals trophy

- In 2001, the #4 seed Charlotte Sting were the lowest seed to make the WNBA Finals in the conference playoff format.
- The 2003 WNBA Finals was best known for rekindling a heated rivalry between the two teams' head coaches, Los Angeles Sparks head coach Michael Cooper and Detroit Shock head coach Bill Laimbeer. Both coaches were fierce NBA competitors who played in the NBA Finals against each other in 1988 and 1989.
- 2006 marked the first time that a #1 seed did not participate in the WNBA Finals. Detroit and Sacramento were both #2 seeds.
- 2006 also marked the first time that the team with the best point-differential in the regular-season did not win the WNBA Finals or even advance to the WNBA Finals. The Connecticut Sun had the best point differential in '06 but were ousted by the Shock in the Eastern Conference Finals.
- The Detroit Shock hosted the largest crowd in Finals History (tied, 22,076 in Game 3 of the 2003 WNBA Finals and in Game 5 of the 2007 WNBA Finals).
- The 2007 game-five win by the Phoenix Mercury marked the first time in WNBA history that a team won the Finals while playing on their opponent's home court.
- In 2008 the San Antonio Silver Stars became the first team in WNBA Finals history to be swept in a five-game series, losing to the Detroit Shock.
- The 2011 WNBA Finals was the first coached by two women.
- In 2014, the Chicago Sky became the first team to appear in the WNBA Finals with a sub-.500 record.
- In 2016, the Los Angeles Sparks won by one point despite a later announcement by the WNBA that officials missed an earlier shot-clock violation at 1:14, which should not have counted.
- In 2021, the #6 seed Chicago Sky were the lowest seed to make the WNBA Finals in the current playoff format.
- The New York Liberty have lost the most championships (5) before winning their first one in 2024.
- In 2026, the Golden State Valkyries won the championship in their second year of existence, becoming the first expansion franchise to win a championship in under five years.

== Finals appearances ==
The Houston Comets, Minnesota Lynx, and Seattle Storm hold the distinction of having won the most championships with four titles each. The New York Liberty have lost the most championships with five. The Lynx have the most appearances in the championships with seven (including 2024). Highlighted teams have folded and can no longer reach the WNBA Finals.

Statistics below refer to series wins and losses, not individual game wins and losses.

Teams	Win	Loss	Total	Win %	Year(s) won	Year(s) lost
Minnesota Lynx	4	3	7	.571	2011, 2013, 2015, 2017	2012, 2016, 2024
Houston Comets	4	0	4	1.000	1997, 1998, 1999, 2000	-
Seattle Storm	4	0	4	1.000	2004, 2010, 2018, 2020	-
Phoenix Mercury	3	3	6	.500	2007, 2009, 2014	1998, 2021, 2025
Los Angeles Sparks	3	2	5	.600	2001, 2002, 2016	2003, 2017
Las Vegas Aces (Note: previously known as San Antonio Silver Stars (2003–2013) and San Antonio Stars (2014–2017))	3	2	5	.600	2022, 2023, 2025	2008, 2020
Detroit Shock (Note: now known as Dallas Wings)	3	1	4	.750	2003, 2006, 2008	2007
New York Liberty	1	5	6	.167	2024	1997, 1999, 2000, 2002, 2023
Indiana Fever	1	2	3	.333	2012	2009, 2015
Sacramento Monarchs (Note: folded on November 20, 2009)	1	1	2	.500	2005	2006
Washington Mystics	1	1	2	.500	2019	2018
Chicago Sky	1	1	2	.500	2021	2014
Golden State Valkyries	1	0	0	1.000	2026	
Connecticut Sun (Note: folded in October 2026)	0	4	4	.000	-	2004, 2005, 2019, 2022
Atlanta Dream	0	4	4	.000	-	2010, 2011, 2013, 2026
Charlotte Sting (Note: folded on January 3, 2007)	0	1	1	.000	-	2001

Former teams that had no WNBA Finals appearances:

- Cleveland Rockers (1997–2003)
- Miami Sol (2000–2002)
- Portland Fire (2000–2002)

Current teams that have no WNBA Finals appearances:

- Portland Fire (2026–present)
- Toronto Tempo (2026–present)

== Records ==
This table shows a list of records through the history of the WNBA Finals.

Finals records
Milestone	Player	Team	Date	Statistic
Points, individual	Angel McCoughtry	Atlanta Dream	October 5, 2011	38 points
Rebounds, individual	Sylvia Fowles	Minnesota Lynx	October 4, 2017	20 rebounds
Assists, individual	Sue Bird	Seattle Storm	October 2, 2020	16 assists
Steals, individual	Breanna Stewart	New York Liberty	October 13, 2024	7 steals
Blocks, individual	Brittney Griner	Phoenix Mercury	September 7, 2014	8 blocks
Points, team	N/A	Phoenix Mercury	September 29, 2009	120 points vs. Indiana (OT)
Rebounds, team	N/A	Detroit Shock	September 8, 2007	50 rebounds vs. Phoenix
Assists, team	N/A	Seattle Storm	October 4, 2020	33 assists vs. Las Vegas
Steals, team	N/A	Connecticut Sun	October 8, 2004	15 steals vs. Seattle
Blocks, team	N/A	Minnesota Lynx	October 2, 2011	11 blocks vs. Atlanta
Career wins, coach	Van Chancellor; Cheryl Reeve	Houston Comets; Minnesota Lynx	1997-2000; 2011-2017	4 wins
Margin of victory	N/A	Seattle Storm	October 6, 2020	33-point win (92-59) over Las Vegas
Attendance, one game	N/A	Detroit Shock	September 16, 2003; September 16, 2007	22,076

== See also ==
- WNBA playoffs
- List of WNBA seasons
- WNBA Coach of the Year
- WNBA Finals Most Valuable Player
- WNBA Most Valuable Player
- WNBA Defensive Player of the Year
- WNBA Most Improved Player
- WNBA Rookie of the Year
- Kim Perrot Sportsmanship Award
