= Trina Frierson =

American basketball player (born 1979)

Personal information
- Born: October 13, 1980 (age 46) Vicksburg, Mississippi, U.S.
- Listed height: 6 ft 2 in (1.88 m)
- Listed weight: 186 lb (84 kg)

Career information
- High school: Vicksburg (Vicksburg, Mississippi)
- College: Louisiana Tech (1999–2004)
- WNBA draft: 2004: 2nd round, 19th overall pick
- Drafted by: Seattle Storm
- Position: Forward
- Number: 50
- Coaching career: 2005–2011

Career history

Playing
- 2004: Seattle Storm

Coaching
- 2005–2011: Northwestern State (assistant)

Career highlights
- WNBA champion (2004); 2× First-team All-WAC (2003, 2004)
- Stats at Basketball Reference

Catrina Nicole Frierson (born August 23, 1979) (Note: Frierson's WNBA.com player profile and Basketball Reference use the August 23, 1979, date. Her WNBA.com draft prospect profile and Northwestern State biography use a birth date of October 13, 1980.) is an American former professional basketball player and coach. She won a Women's National Basketball Association (WNBA) championship with the Seattle Storm in 2004.

Frierson is a native of Vicksburg, Mississippi, and attended Vicksburg High School. She played college basketball for the Louisiana Tech Lady Techsters from 1999 to 2004 and was a two-time first-team All-Western Athletic Conference (WAC) selection. Frierson missed the entirety of the 2000–01 season after she tore ligaments in her knee. She averaged a career-best 16.2 points per game during her senior season.

Frierson was selected by the Seattle Storm as the 19th overall pick of the 2004 WNBA draft. She received limited playing time as a result of knee injuries and only played in five games for the Storm as they went on to win the WNBA championship in her rookie season. Frierson was waived by the Storm during training camp before the 2005 WNBA season.

Frierson joined the Northwestern State Lady Demons as an assistant coach on August 24, 2005. She ended her stint with the Lady Demons in 2011 and returned to Vicksburg, where she conducts basketball training sessions and camps.

== Career statistics ==
Legend
GP	Games played	GS	Games started	MPG	Minutes per game	RPG	Rebounds per game
APG	Assists per game	SPG	Steals per game	BPG	Blocks per game	PPG	Points per game
TO	Turnovers per game	FG%	Field-goal percentage	3P%	3-point field-goal percentage	FT%	Free-throw percentage
**Bold**	Career best	°	League leader

=== WNBA ===
==== Regular season ====
Year	Team	GP	GS	MPG	FG%	3P%	FT%	RPG	APG	SPG	BPG	TO	PPG
2004	Seattle	5	0	4.4	22.2	0.0	100.0	1.0	0.0	0.0	0.0	0.2	1.4
Career	1 year, 1 team	5	0	4.4	22.2	0.0	100.0	1.0	0.0	0.0	0.0	0.2	1.4

=== College ===
Legend
GP	Games played	GS	Games started	MPG	Minutes per game
FG%	Field goal percentage	3P%	3-point field goal percentage	FT%	Free throw percentage
RPG	Rebounds per game	APG	Assists per game	SPG	Steals per game
BPG	Blocks per game	PPG	Points per game	**Bold**	Career high

Year	Team	GP	Points	FG%	3P%	FT%	RPG	APG	SPG	BPG	PPG
1999-00	Louisiana Tech	32	336	48.5%	20.0%	73.2%	4.6	0.3	0.9	0.2	10.5
2001–02	Louisiana Tech	30	233	45.9%	**25.0%**	72.1%	4.9	0.8	0.5	0.4	7.8
2002–03	Louisiana Tech	**34**	**510**	**52.9%**	0.0%	**75.6%**	**7.3**	0.6	0.6	0.3	15.0
2003–04	Louisiana Tech	31	502	50.8%	22.2%	70.7%	7.0	**0.8**	**1.3**	**0.7**	**16.2**
Career		127	1581	50.2%	11.1%	73.1%	9.6	0.6	0.8	0.4	12.4
