= Anne Donovan =

American basketball player and coach

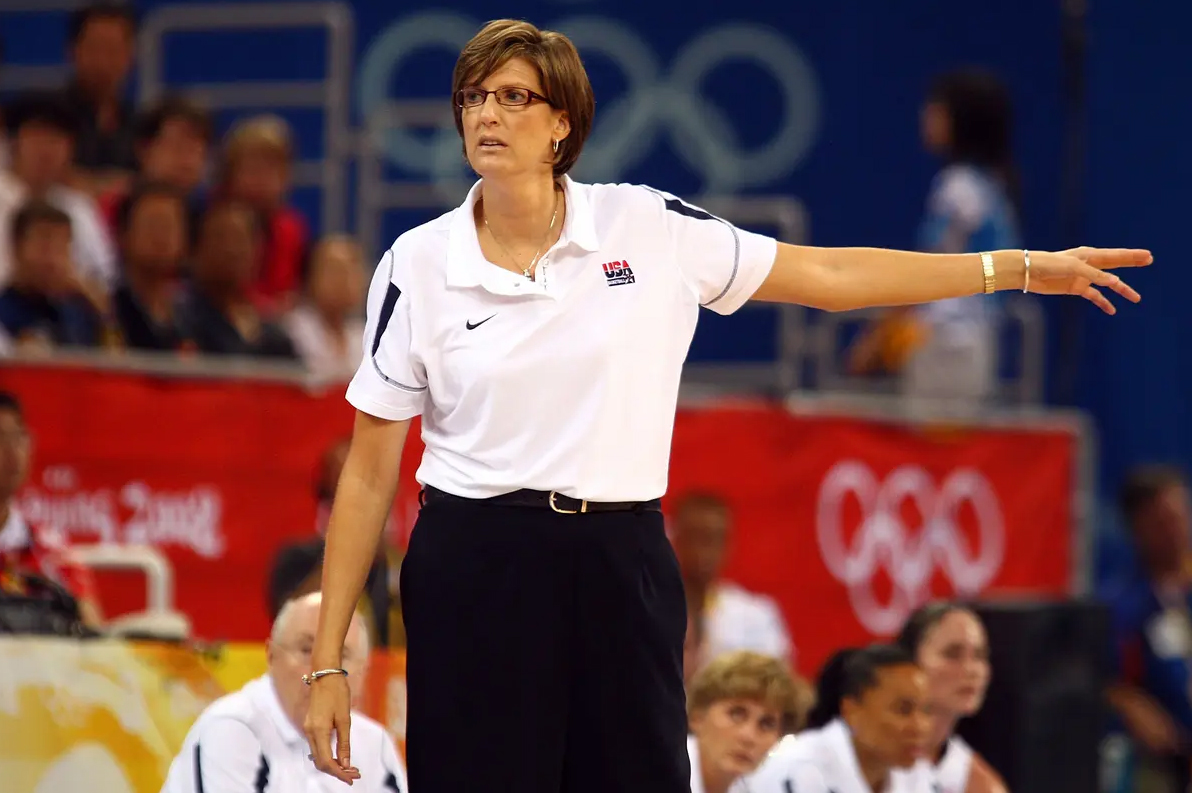
- Donovan in 2008

Personal information
- Born: November 1, 1961 Ridgewood, New Jersey, U.S.
- Died: June 13, 2018 (aged 56) Wilmington, North Carolina, U.S.
- Listed height: 6 ft 8 in (2.03 m)

Career information
- High school: Paramus Catholic (Paramus, New Jersey)
- College: Old Dominion (1979–1983)
- Position: Center
- Coaching career: 1989–2015

Career history

Coaching
- 1989–1995: Old Dominion (assistant)
- 1995–1998: East Carolina
- 1998: Philadelphia Rage
- 2000: Indiana Fever (interim)
- 2001–2002: Charlotte Sting
- 2003–2007: Seattle Storm
- 2009: New York Liberty (assistant)
- 2009–2010: New York Liberty
- 2010–2013: Seton Hall
- 2013–2015: Connecticut Sun

Career highlights
- As player: Naismith College Player of the Year (1983); Honda Sports Award (1983); WBCA Player of the Year (1983); 2× Kodak All-American (1981, 1983); As coach: WNBA champion (2004)
- Basketball Hall of Fame
- Women's Basketball Hall of Fame
- FIBA Hall of Fame
Medals
Women's basketball
Representing United States
Olympic Games
Gold medal – first place	1984 Los Angeles	Team competition
Gold medal – first place	1988 Seoul	Team competition
Pan American Games
Gold medal – first place	1987 Indianapolis	Team
Gold medal – first place	1983 Caracas	Team competition
Jones Cup
Gold medal – first place	1984 Taipei	Team competition
Head coach for United States
Olympic Games
Gold medal – first place	2008 Beijing	Team competition
FIBA World Championship for Women
Bronze medal – third place	2006 Sao Paulo	Team competition
Assistant coach for United States
Olympic Games
Gold medal – first place	2004 Athens	Team competition
FIBA World Championship for Women
Gold medal – first place	2002 China	Team competition
Gold medal – first place	1998 Berlin	Team competition

Anne Theresa Donovan (November 1, 1961 – June 13, 2018) was an American women's basketball player and coach. From 2013 to 2015, she was the head coach of the Connecticut Sun.

In her playing career, Donovan won a national championship with Old Dominion University, won two Olympic gold medals, and went to three Final Fours overall. She was enshrined in the Basketball Hall of Fame in 1995, and became a member of the FIBA Hall of Fame in 2015. Donovan was inducted in the inaugural class at the Women's Basketball Hall of Fame in 1999.

As a professional basketball coach, she guided the Seattle Storm to their first title in 2004, becoming the first woman to coach a WNBA Championship team (as well as the youngest person to coach a WNBA champion, at age 42). She is the only person to have both played for a national women's college title and coached a team to a professional title.

After coaching the Indiana Fever and the Charlotte Sting earlier in her career, Donovan joined the New York Liberty as an assistant coach in the spring of 2009, then took over as interim head coach of the Liberty on July 31, 2009. She then went back to college to Seton Hall for two seasons before resigning to take the Connecticut Sun head coaching job for two seasons. Donovan was also the coach of the Olympic gold medal-winning 2008 United States Women's Basketball team.

== High school ==
Donovan attended Paramus Catholic High School in Paramus, New Jersey. At 6'6", Donovan led her high school team to consecutive undefeated seasons, including two state championships. She averaged 25 points per game and 17 rebounds her senior year.

== College ==
Donovan, at 6'8", was the most recruited female player in the nation going into college. Two years earlier, Anne's sister Mary received only a handful of offers before going to Penn State. In 1979, Anne received offers from more than 250 schools, including a recruiting pitch from Penn State's Joe Paterno. Despite the personal plea, she chose to follow Nancy Lieberman to ODU. At Old Dominion University (ODU), the center led the Lady Monarchs to the 1979–80 Association for Intercollegiate Athletics for Women basketball championship. She was the first female Naismith College Player of the Year in 1983. Donovan also won the 1983 Honda Sports Award and WBCA Player of the Year award for basketball. She set ODU career marks for points (2,719), rebounds (1,976), and blocked shots (801), and seasonal marks for most games played (38), most minutes played (1,159), most field goals (377), and field goal percentage (.640). She averaged a double-double for her entire career, with 20 points and 14½ rebounds per game. Donovan's 50 points in a single game against Norfolk State on December 11, 1980, is a school record, while her 801 career blocked shots is best in NCAA history.

At ODU, Donovan helped the Lady Monarchs win the 1980 AIAW national title (their second straight) with a 37–1 record. She had ten blocks and seventeen rebounds in their win over Tennessee. In 1981, ODU finished third in the AIAW National Tournament, having compiled a 28–7 record.

The first two NCAA Women's Final Fours (1982 and 1983) were hosted by ODU at Scope in Norfolk, Va. In 1982, Old Dominion (28–7) lost to Kansas St. in the East Regional semifinals. In Donovan's senior year, the Lady Monarchs (29–6) advanced to the 1983 Final Four in their hometown, but lost 71–55 in the national semifinals to rival Louisiana Tech.

=== Old Dominion University statistics ===
Legend
GP	Games played	GS	Games started	MPG	Minutes per game
FG%	Field goal percentage	3P%	3-point field goal percentage	FT%	Free throw percentage
RPG	Rebounds per game	APG	Assists per game	SPG	Steals per game
BPG	Blocks per game	PPG	Points per game	**Bold**	Career high

Year	Team	GP	Points	FG%	FT%	RPG	APG	BPG	PPG
1979–80	Old Dominion University	38	648	63.0%	53.9%	12.9	1.6	6.0	17.1
1980–81	Old Dominion University	35	**879**	63.8%	**71.4%**	**16.2**	1.5	5.7	**25.1**
1981–82	Old Dominion University	28	579	**64.0%**	69.7%	14.7	**2.6**	6.0	20.7
1982–83	Old Dominion University	**35**	613	61.4%	66.9%	14.4	2.5	5.9	17.5
Career		136	2719	63.1%	66.1%	14.5	2.0	5.9	20.0

== Professional career ==
As there were few professional opportunities for women basketball players in the U.S., Donovan played pro ball for Chanson V-Magic in Shizuoka, Japan and Modena, Italy from 1984 to 1989.

== Coaching career ==
Upon her retirement as a player, she became an assistant coach at ODU from 1989 to 1995, then head coach at East Carolina University from 1995 to 1998, reaching the Colonial Athletic Association finals against her alma mater, Old Dominion. Her coaching career moved to the professional ranks via a brief stint with the American Basketball League's Philadelphia Rage in 1997–98. As the ABL folded, she joined the rival WNBA as an assistant coach for the expansion Indiana Fever. With coach Nell Fortner leading the U.S. Olympic team, Donovan served as interim head coach for the Fever for the 2000 season. She then led the Charlotte Sting to the WNBA Finals in 2001, losing to the Los Angeles Sparks. In 2002, she led the Sting to an 18–14 record, losing to the Washington Mystics in the first round of playoffs.

Donovan was inducted to the Basketball Hall of Fame in 1995, and as part of the inaugural class of the Women's Basketball Hall of Fame in 1999.

In 2003, Donovan was hired as the second head coach of the Seattle Storm, inheriting a team with two number one draft picks from 2001 and 2002, the Australian Lauren Jackson and University of Connecticut star Sue Bird. In her first year, Donovan's team narrowly missed the playoffs, but in 2004, after Donovan became director of player personnel and added Betty Lennox, the Storm earned the city of Seattle its first national championship in 25 years.

In the 2005 season, in which Donovan became the first female coach to win 100 games, the Storm made the playoffs but lost in the first round. At season's end, Donovan's contract was extended to keep her in Seattle for several years.

With her 120th victory on August 6, 2006, she became the coach with the third-most WNBA victories, passing former Los Angeles Sparks coach Michael Cooper. She trails only Van Chancellor and Richie Adubato in victories.

On November 30, 2007, Donovan resigned from her position of head coach of the Seattle Storm.

On April 28, 2009, Donovan was appointed as an assistant coach for the New York Liberty. She assumed the position of interim head coach of the Liberty on July 31, 2009, replacing former head coach Pat Coyle.

On March 31, 2010, she accepted the women's basketball head coaching position at Seton Hall University on March 29, 2010, although she completed the 2010 season with the Liberty.

On November 6, 2010, Donovan recorded her first win as the head coach of Seton Hall's women's team as the Pirates defeated the Temple Owls by a score of 72–59 at Walsh Gymnasium.

She resigned the coaching job at Seton Hall in January 2013 and accepted a position with the WNBA's Connecticut Sun, where she spent three seasons until she resigned as head coach on October 1, 2015.

== USA Basketball as player ==
Donovan was named to the team representing the US at the inaugural William Jones Cup competition in Taipei, Taiwan. The USA team had a record of 3–4, finishing in fifth place, although one of the wins was over South Korea, who would go on to win the gold medal.

A three-time Olympian, she earned gold medals in 1984 and 1988. Donovan had qualified for the 1980 U.S. Olympic team but did not compete due to the American-led boycott of the 1980 Summer Olympics. She did however receive one of 461 Congressional Gold Medals created especially for the athletes.

Donovan was a member of the USA National team at the 1983 World Championships, held in Sao Paulo, Brazil. The team won six games, but lost two against the Soviet Union. In an opening round game, the USA team had a nine-point lead at halftime, but the Soviets came back to take the lead, and a final shot by the USA failed to drop, leaving the USSR team with a one-point victory 85–84. The USA team won their next four games, setting up the gold medal game against USSR. This game was also close, and was tied at 82 points each with six seconds to go in the game. The Soviets Elena Chausova received the inbounds pass and hit the game winning shot in the final seconds, giving the USSR team the gold medal with a score of 84–82. The USA team earned the silver medal. Donovan averaged 5.8 points per game.

Donovan also played on two USA Women's Pan American Teams. She played on the 1983 team, winning the gold in Venezuela, and on the 1987 team winning the gold in Indianapolis, Indiana. In 1984, the USA sent its National team to the 1984 William Jones Cup competition in Taipei, Taiwan, for pre-Olympic practice. The team easily beat each of the eight teams they played, winning by an average of just under 50 points per game. Donovan averaged 8.2 points per game and tied for the team lead with eight blocks.

Donovan was selected to represent the US at the inaugural Goodwill games, held in Moscow in July 1986. North Carolina State's Kay Yow served as head coach. The team opened up with a 72–53 win against Yugoslavia, and followed that with a 21-point win over Brazil 91–70, with Donovan leading the team scoring with 20 points. The third game was against Czechoslovakia and would be much closer. Donovan was one of the scoring leaders in this game, scoring 15 points to help the US to a 78–70 victory. The USA faced Bulgaria in the semi-final match up, and again won, this time 67–58. This set up the final against the Soviet Union, led by 7-foot-2 Uljana Semjonova, considered the most dominant player in the world. The Soviet team, had a 152–2 record in major international competition over the prior three decades, including an 84–82 win over the US in the 1983 World Championships. The Soviets held the early edge, leading 21–19 at one time, before the USA went on a scoring run to take a large lead they would never relinquish. The final score was 83–60 in favor of the US, earning the gold medal for the USA squad. For the entire event, Donovan averaged eleven points, tied for third leading scorer with Katrina McClain Johnson.

Donovan continued to represent the US with National team at the 1986 World Championship, held in Moscow, a month after the Goodwill games in Moscow. The USA team was even more dominant this time. The early games were won easily, and the semifinal against Canada, while the closest game for the USA so far, ended up an 82–59 victory. At the same time, the Soviet team was winning easily as well, and the final game pitted two teams each with 6–0 records. The Soviet team, having lost only once at home, wanted to show that the Goodwill games setback was a fluke. The USA team started by scoring the first eight points, and raced to a 45–23 lead, although the Soviets fought back and reduced the halftime margin to 13. The USA went on a 15–1 run in the second half to out the game away, and ended up winning the gold medal with a score of 108–88. Donovan was one of five double-digit scorers in the game with 16 points.

== USA Basketball as coach ==
In 1998, Donovan was named an assistant coach of the USA National Team, under head coach Nell Fortner. The USA team competed in the World Championships held in three cities in Germany, including Berlin, Germany. The USA team won all six of the preliminary round games, with most game in double-digit margins. The one exception was the opening round game against Japan, which the USA team won 95–89. In the quarterfinals, the USA team beat Slovakia 89–62. In the semifinal match up against Brazil. the USA team was behind by ten points in the first half, but came back and won by 14 points. The championship game was a rematch against Russia, a team the USA had defeated by 36 points in the preliminary round. However, the gold medal game would unfold very differently. The USA team was behind most of the game, with a nine-point deficit at halftime. When there were under two minutes to play, the USA was still behind, but Ruthie Bolton hit a three-pointer to give the USA team a one-point lead. After the Russians tied the game, Bolton hit another three to give the USA team a lead they would not relinquish. The USA team won 71–65 to win the gold medal.

Donovan continued as assistant coach to the National team in the 2002 World Championships, held during September in three cities in China, including Nanjing, China. The USA won the opening six preliminary rounds easily, with no contest closer than 30 points. That included the opening round game against Russia, who has played them close at the 1998 Championship final. In the opening game, the USA won 89–55 behind 20 points form Lisa Leslie and 17 from Sheryl Swoopes. The USA wasn't seriously challenged in the quarterfinals, where they beat Spain by 39 points. The semifinal game against Australia was closer, but Leslie had a double-double with 24 points and 13 rebounds to help the USA team win by 15 points. In the championship game, much like the 1998 finals, the rematch was much closer. This time the USA team did not have to play form behind, and had a ten-point lead late ant he game, but the Russians cut the lead to a single point with just over three minutes remaining. The game remained close, and was within three points with just over twelve seconds to go, but Swoopes was fouled and sank the free throws to give the USA a 79–74 win and the gold medal.

In 2004, Donovan was named the assistant coach of the National team representing the US at the Olympic Games in Athens, Greece. The USA team was dominant, led by Lisa Leslie's 15.6 points per game. The USA team won the five preliminary contests with relative ease, with the closest match being the 71–58 victory over Spain. The USA team beat the host Greece in the quarter-finals, then faced Russia in the semifinals. The Russians gave the USA a strong challenge, but the USA team prevailed 66–62 to set up the championship game against Australia. The final would be a rematch of the 2000 Olympic results, and the USA team again prevailed, winning 74–63 to secure the gold medal.

Donovan took over the head coaching duties for the USA National team in 2006, but that was far from the only change on the team. Lisa Leslie, who had led the team in scoring in the 2004 Olympics, the 2002 World Championships, the 2000 Olympics, the 1998 World Championships, and the 1996 Olympics was no longer on the team. Sheryl Swoopes was available but hampered by injuries, and Dawn Staley moved on to coaching. Newcomers Sue Bird, Candace Parker and Diana Taurasi picked up the slack, but it was a team in transition. As an additional challenge, some members of the squad were unable to join the team for practices due to WNBA commitments. The team started out strong, winning each of the six preliminary games, including the game against Russia. In the quarterfinals, the USA team beat Spain 90–56. The semifinal was a rematch against Russia, but this time the Russian team prevailed, 75–68. The USA faced Brazil in the bronze medal game, and won easily 99–59.

Donovan continued as head coach for the 2008 Olympic Games. Lisa Leslie returned to the team, and although she no longer led the team in scoring she scored over ten points per game, and was the second leading rebounder behind Sylvia Fowles. The team dominated their opponents, winning all eight games with the closest result being the fifteen-point victory over Russia in the semifinals. In that game, the Russian held a lead into the third quarter, but the USA team proved to be too strong, and turned a five-point deficit into a fifteen-point final margin of victory. The championship game was against Australia, who came into the final game undefeated. However, the USA took an early lead and never relinquished it, finishing the game with a 92–65 margin and the fourth consecutive gold medal for the USA team.

== Head coaching record ==
Legend
Regular season	G	Games coached	W	Games won	L	Games lost	W–L %	Win–loss %
Playoffs	PG	Playoff games	PW	Playoff wins	PL	Playoff losses	PW–L %	Playoff win–loss %

=== WNBA ===
Team	Year	G	W	L	W–L%	Finish	PG	PW	PL	PW–L%	Result
Indiana	2000	32	9	23	.281	7th in East	—	—	—	—	Missed playoffs
Charlotte	2001	32	18	14	.563	4th in East	8	4	4	.500	Lost WNBA Finals
Charlotte	2002	32	18	14	.563	1st in East	0	2	2	.000	Lost in Eastern conference semifinals
Seattle	2003	34	18	16	.529	4th in West	—	—	—	—	Missed playoffs
Seattle	2004	34	20	14	.588	2nd in West	8	6	2	.750	Won WNBA Finals
Seattle	2005	34	20	14	.588	2nd in West	3	1	2	.333	Lost Western conference semifinals
Seattle	2006	34	18	16	.529	3rd in West	3	1	2	.333	Lost in Western conference semifinals
Seattle	2007	34	17	17	.500	4th in West	2	0	2	.000	Lost in Western conference semifinals
New York	2009	17	7	10	.412	7th in East	—	—	—	—	Missed playoffs
New York	2010	34	22	12	.647	1st in East	5	2	3	.400	Lost in Eastern conference finals
Connecticut	2013	34	10	24	.294	6th in East	—	—	—	—	Missed playoffs
Connecticut	2014	34	13	21	.382	6th in East	—	—	—	—	Missed playoffs
Connecticut	2015	34	15	19	.441	5th in East	—	—	—	—	Missed playoffs
Career		419	205	214	.489		31	14	17	.452	

== Awards and honors ==
- Two-time CoSIDA Academic All-American while at ODU.
- 1983—Winner of the Honda Sports Award for basketball
- Inducted into the CoSIDA Academic All-American Hall of Fame in 1994.
- Inducted into the ODU Sports Hall of Fame in 1988.
- Inducted into the Naismith Basketball Hall of Fame in 1995.
- Inducted into the Virginia Sports Hall of Fame in 1996.
- Inducted into the Women's Basketball Hall of Fame in 1999
- Inducted into the New Jersey Sportswriters Association Hall of Fame in 2000.
- Received the NCAA 25 Year Award on January 13, 2008.
- On October 24, 2004, she was named by the Sun Belt Conference as its All-Time Women's basketball Player.
- Awarded an Honorary Doctor of Humane Letters during the 109th commencement ceremony (December 13, 2008) from Old Dominion University in recognition of her recent and past contributions to Women's Basketball.
- In May 2009, she was named to the Hampton Roads Sports Hall of Fame, which honors athletes, coaches and administrators who contributed to sports in southeastern Virginia.
- Inducted into the FIBA Hall of Fame, in 2015.
- Inducted into the New Jersey Hall of Fame in 2019.

== Death ==
Donovan died on June 13, 2018, of heart failure in Wilmington, North Carolina. She was 56 years old.
