= 2004 Seattle Storm season =

- WNBA champions
- Head coach: Anne Donovan
- Arena: KeyArena

Results
- Record: 20–14 (.588)
- Place: 2nd (Western)
- Playoff finish: Won WNBA Finals (2-1) vs Connecticut Sun

The 2004 WNBA season was the fifth season for the Seattle Storm. They captured their first title in franchise history, bringing a title back to Seattle for the first time since 1979 when the Seattle SuperSonics, the Storm's former sister team, brought a title to Seattle by beating the Washington Bullets.

== Offseason ==
=== WNBA draft ===
Pick	Player	Nationality	School/Club team
19	Trina Frierson	United States	Louisiana Tech

== Regular season ==
=== Season standings ===
Western Conference	W	L	PCT	GB	Home	Road	Conf.
Los Angeles Sparks ^{x}	25	9	.735	–	15–2	10–7	16–6
Seattle Storm ^{x}	20	14	.588	5.0	13–4	7–10	13–9
Minnesota Lynx ^{x}	18	16	.529	7.0	11–6	7–10	12–10
Sacramento Monarchs ^{x}	18	16	.529	7.0	10–7	8–9	12–10
Phoenix Mercury ^{o}	17	17	.500	8.0	10–7	7–10	11–11
Houston Comets ^{o}	13	21	.382	12.0	9–8	4–13	7–15
San Antonio Silver Stars ^{o}	9	25	.265	16.0	6–11	3–14	6–16

=== Season schedule ===
Game	Date	Opponent	Result	Record
1	May 20	Minnesota	W 88–85	1–0
2	May 22	Los Angeles	W 93–67	2–0
3	May 28	@ Phoenix	L 76–84	2–1
4	June 1	@ Los Angeles	L 70–73	2–2
5	June 3	Phoenix	W 72–45	3–2
6	June 5	@ Sacramento	W 65–63	4–2
7	June 11	Connecticut	W 68–63	5–2
8	June 15	@ New York	W 86–62	6–2
9	June 18	@ Houston	W 69–63	7–2
10	June 19	@ San Antonio	W 74–61	8–2
11	June 22	Houston	L 57–63	8–3
12	June 26	New York	L 62–67	8–4
13	July 1	San Antonio	W 76–52	9–4
14	July 3	Sacramento	W 75–61	10–4
15	July 7	@ Washington	L 69–72	10–5
16	July 8	@ Charlotte	L 67–70	10–6
17	July 10	@ Detroit	L 65–70	10–7
18	July 12	San Antonio	W 75–59	11–7
19	July 15	@ Sacramento	W 66–63	12–7
20	July 17	Washington	W 85–83	13–7
21	July 22	Indiana	W 59–54	14–7
22	July 24	Houston	W 67–63	15–7
23	July 27	@ Houston	L 55–80	15–8
24	July 30	@ Minnesota	W 70–55	16–8
25	August 1	Charlotte	W 87–55	17–8
26	September 1	Sacramento	L 65–73	17–9
27	September 3	@ Los Angeles	L 81–82	17–10
28	September 4	@ Phoenix	L 55–63	17–11
29	September 8	Detroit	W 86–67	18–11
30	September 10	@ Minnesota	L 61–64	18–12
31	September 12	@ Connecticut	L 64–71	18–13
32	September 13	@ Indiana	W 76–70	19–13
33	September 15	Phoenix	W 73–58	20–13
34	September 18	Los Angeles	L 80–83	20–14

== Playoff Results ==
Game	Date	Opponent	Result	Record
Western Conference Semifinals
1	September 25	@ Minnesota	W 70–58	1–0
2	September 27	Minnesota	W 64–54	2–0
Western Conference Finals
1	October 1	@ Sacramento	L 72–74 (OT)	0–1
2	October 3	Sacramento	W 66–54	1–1
3	October 5	Sacramento	W 82–62	2–1
WNBA Finals
1	October 8	@ Connecticut	L 64–68	0–1
2	October 10	Connecticut	W 67–65	1–1
3	October 12	Connecticut	W 74–60	2–1

== Player stats ==
Note: GP= Games played; REB= Rebounds; AST= Assists; STL = Steals; BLK = Blocks; PTS = Points; AVG = Average

Player	GP	REB	AST	STL	BLK	PTS
Lauren Jackson	31	207	51	31	62	634
Sue Bird	34	106	184	51	5	439
Betty Lennox	32	159	79	34	3	358
Sheri Sam	34	139	82	53	6	310
Kamila Vodichkova	34	168	55	32	12	273
Janell Burse	29	96	19	23	36	141
Tully Bevilaqua	34	26	29	38	2	79
Adia Barnes	34	63	31	23	2	67
Alicia Thompson	23	24	9	6	0	52
Simone Edwards	23	56	5	8	3	48
Michelle Greco	13	10	8	3	0	29
Trina Frierson	5	5	0	0	0	7

== Playoffs ==
- Won WNBA Western Conference Semifinals (2-0) over Minnesota Lynx
- Won WNBA Western Conference Finals (2-1) over Sacramento Monarchs
- Won WNBA Finals (2-1) over Connecticut Sun

== Awards and honors ==
- Betty Lennox, WNBA Finals MVP Award
- Lauren Jackson, WNBA Peak Performer
- Lauren Jackson, Best WNBA Player ESPY Award
