= Tasha Butts =

American basketball player and coach (1982–2023)

Personal information
- Born: March 10, 1982 Milledgeville, Georgia, U.S.
- Died: October 23, 2023 (aged 41)
- Listed height: 5 ft 11 in (1.80 m)

Career information
- High school: Baldwin (Milledgeville, Georgia)
- College: Tennessee (2000–2004)
- WNBA draft: 2004: 2nd round, 20th overall pick
- Drafted by: Minnesota Lynx
- Playing career: 2004–2006
- Position: Forward
- Number: 1
- Coaching career: 2007–2023

Career history

Playing
- 2004: Minnesota Lynx

Coaching
- 2007–2008: Duquesne (assistant)
- 2008–2011: UCLA (assistant)
- 2011–2019: LSU (assistant)
- 2019–2023: Georgia Tech (associate HC)
- 2023: Georgetown
- Stats at Basketball Reference

Tasha Butts (March 10, 1982 – October 23, 2023) was an American basketball player and coach. She played for the Minnesota Lynx of the Women's National Basketball Association (WNBA). She was an assistant coach at several NCAA schools over 17 seasons. She was hired as the head coach of the Georgetown Hoyas women's basketball team, but died of breast cancer before her first game as a head coach.

== Career ==
Butts attended Baldwin High School in Milledgeville, Georgia, and was named the state's girls basketball player of the year in 2000. She then enrolled at the University of Tennessee to play college basketball for the Tennessee Volunteers women's basketball team.

The Minnesota Lynx of the WNBA selected Butts with the 20th overall selection in the 2004 WNBA draft. Butts played for the Lynx in the 2004 WNBA season. Over the next four years, she had various contracts with other WNBA teams, none of which resulted in further regular season playing time. She returned to Tennessee in 2005 as a graduate assistant.

Butts worked as an assistant coach at Duquesne University. She left there to serve as an assistant coach at the University of California, Los Angeles.

From 2011 to 2019, she was an assistant coach at Louisiana State University and, from 2019 to 2023, served as an assistant coach for the Georgia Tech Yellow Jackets women's basketball team. In April 2023, she was named the head coach of the Georgetown Hoyas women's basketball team.

== Personal life ==
Butts was diagnosed with metastatic breast cancer in November 2021. She died due to complications from breast cancer on October 23, 2023, at the age of 41.

== Career statistics ==
Legend
GP	Games played	GS	Games started	MPG	Minutes per game	RPG	Rebounds per game
APG	Assists per game	SPG	Steals per game	BPG	Blocks per game	PPG	Points per game
TO	Turnovers per game	FG%	Field-goal percentage	3P%	3-point field-goal percentage	FT%	Free-throw percentage
**Bold**	Career best	°	League leader

=== College ===
Year	Team	GP	Points	FG%	3P%	FT%	RPG	APG	SPG	BPG	PPG
2000–01	Tennessee	34	160	42.7	37.5	76.6	2.0	0.8	0.5	0.2	4.7
2001–02	Tennessee	34	147	29.4	30.0	74.5	3.0	1.1	0.7	0.1	4.3
2002–03	Tennessee	**38**	238	35.5	34.6	79.5	4.8	2.3	0.9	0.2	6.3
2003–04	Tennessee	35	**363**	**40.8**	**38.6**	**81.8**	**5.4**	**2.8**	**1.1**	**0.4**	**10.4**
Career	Tennessee	141	908	37.2	35.5	79.3	3.8	1.8	0.8	0.2	6.4

=== WNBA ===
==== Regular season ====
Year	Team	GP	GS	MPG	FG%	3P%	FT%	RPG	APG	SPG	BPG	TO	PPG
2004	Minnesota	30	0	14.1	.300	.270	.720	2.1	0.8	0.4	0.2	0.8	2.5

==== Playoffs ====
Year	Team	GP	GS	MPG	FG%	3P%	FT%	RPG	APG	SPG	BPG	TO	PPG
2004	Minnesota	1	0	1.0	.000	.000	.000	0.0	0.0	0.0	0.0	2.0	0.0
