= Katie Macfarlane =

American basketball player

Personal information
- Born: January 16, 1982 (age 44) Clarence, New York
- Listed height: 6 ft 0 in (1.83 m)

Career information
- High school: Clarence (Clarence, New York)
- College: Army (2000–2004)
- WNBA draft: 2004: undrafted
- Position: Forward

Career highlights
- Patriot Player of the Year (2004); 3x First-team All-Patriot (2002–2004); Patriot All-Freshman Team (2001)

Kathryn Ann Macfarlane (born January 16, 1982) is a former American women's basketball player and a current U.S. Army intelligence officer. She was Army's women's basketball team's all-time leading scorer. Kelsey Minato broke her MacFarlane's record in December 2015.

== High school ==
Macfarlane attended Clarence High School in Clarence, New York. She graduated in 2000 with 1,426 career points, placing her 50th all-time on the Western New York girls basketball all-time scoring leaders list, according to The Buffalo News. In the 1998–1999 season, she was named an All-Western New York first team selection by The Buffalo News. In the 1999–2000 season, she repeated as an All-Western New York first team selection, and also was named Buffalo News Basketball Player of the Year.

== College ==
Macfarlane attended the United States Military Academy at West Point, New York. During her four-year career with the Black Knights, she set the school's all-time scoring record, which had stood for 20 years. In the 2003–04 season, she was chosen as the Patriot League Player Of The Year, as voted by the league's head coaches.

== Army statistics ==
Legend
GP	Games played	GS	Games started	MPG	Minutes per game
FG%	Field goal percentage	3P%	3-point field goal percentage	FT%	Free throw percentage
RPG	Rebounds per game	APG	Assists per game	SPG	Steals per game
BPG	Blocks per game	PPG	Points per game	**Bold**	Career high

Year	Team	GP	Points	FG%	3P%	FT%	RPG	APG	SPG	BPG	PPG
2000–01	Army	29	340	50.4	**42.9**	**75.7**	8.1	0.7	1.3	0.2	11.7
2001–02	Army	29	532	49.9	28.6	75.1	10.2	**1.7**	1.5	0.5	18.3
2002–03	Army	**31**	**549**	51.0	16.7	72.3	**10.6**	1.6	1.4	0.7	17.7
2003–04	Army	28	520	**53.5**	30.8	66.3	10.1	1.3	**1.5**	**0.7**	**18.6**
Career	Army	117	1941	51.2	26.5	72.2	9.8	1.3	1.4	0.5	16.6

== Post-college career ==
Macfarlane was invited to training camp by the Connecticut Sun of the WNBA for the 2004 season. She was signed by the Sun on April 26, 2004. After appearing in one pre-season game, MacFarlane was waived by the Sun on May 12, 2004. MacFarlane then began her career as an Army intelligence officer, where she has served in Iraq for a 15-month tour. She is now married and goes by the name Kathryn Macfarlane Graves. On November 10, 2009, she returned to Clarence High School to be honored as part of the school's Veterans Day events.
