= Mike Thibault =

American basketball player and coach

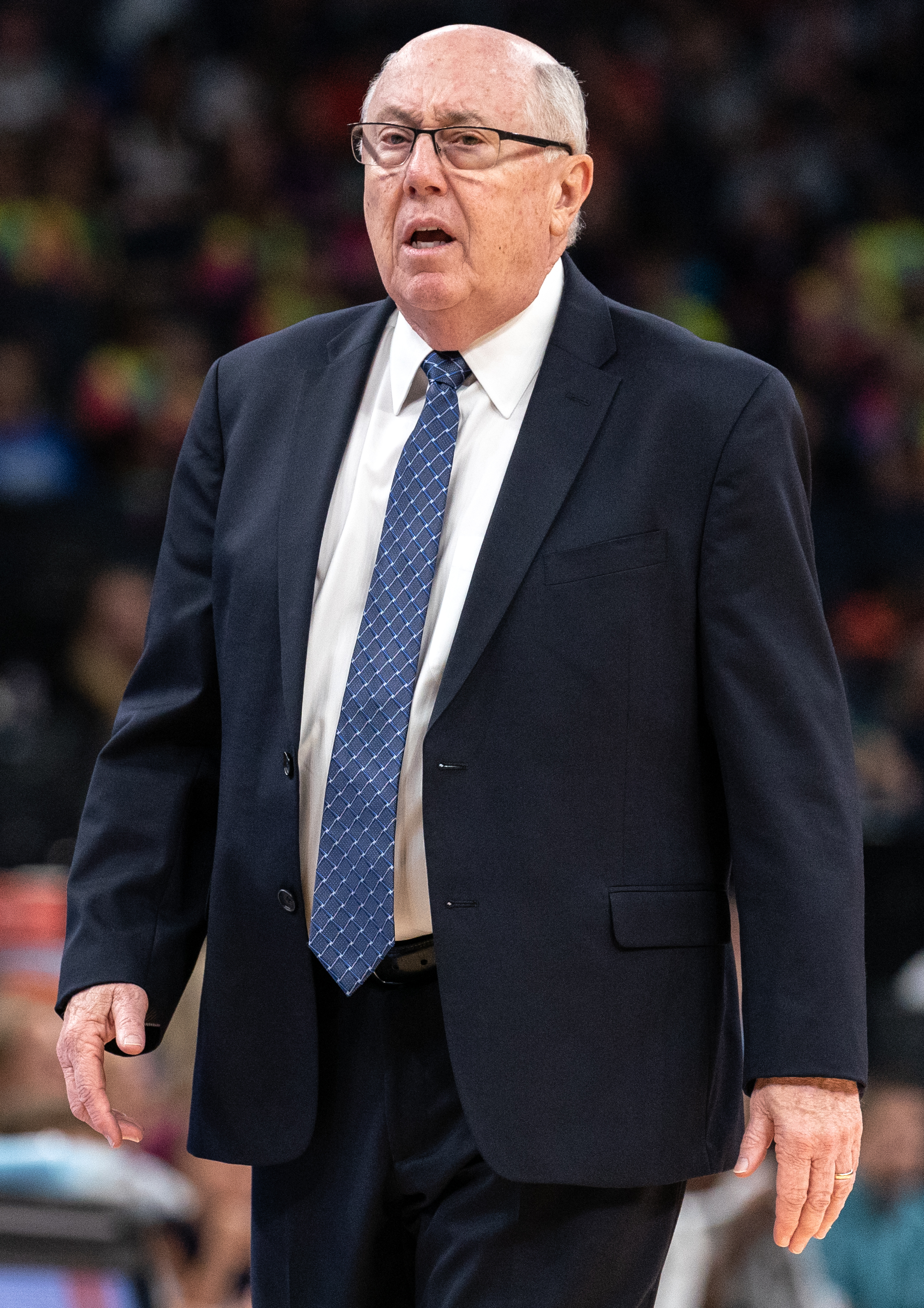
- Thibault in 2019

Belgium
- Position: Head coach

Personal information
- Born: September 28, 1950 (age 76) St. Paul, Minnesota, U.S.

Career information
- College: Saint Martin's
- Coaching career: 1980–present

Career history

Coaching
- 1980–1982: Los Angeles Lakers (assistant)
- 1982–1986: Chicago Bulls (assistant)
- 1988: Calgary 88's
- 1989–1997: Omaha Racers
- 1998–2002: Milwaukee Bucks (assistant)
- 2003–2012: Connecticut Sun
- 2013–2022: Washington Mystics
- 2025–present: Belgian

Career highlights
- As head coach: WNBA champion (2019); WBL Coach of the Year (1988); CBA Champion (1993); 3× WNBA Coach of the Year (2006, 2008, 2013); As assistant coach: 2× NBA champion (1980, 1982)
Medals
Assistant coach for the United States
Olympic Games
Gold medal – first place	2008 Beijing	Team
Gold medal – first place	2024 Paris	Team
World Championship
Gold medal – first place	2022 Australia
Bronze medal – third place	2006 Brazil
Head coach for Belgium
EuroBasket Women
Gold medal – first place	2025 Czechia/Germany/Italy/Greece

Michael Francis Thibault (born September 28, 1950) is an American basketball head coach and basketball general manager. He is the head coach of the Belgian women's national basketball team Belgian Cats since 2025. Before he coached the Connecticut Sun of the WNBA, and the Washington Mystics. In 2013, Thibault became the all-time WNBA leader with his 212th head-coaching victory.

== Career ==
He began his coaching career at Bellarmine College Preparatory, where he coached the freshman B team. Thibault then had stints at Archbishop Mitty High School in San José, Santa Cruz High School, Cabrillo College and Saint Martin's College.

In 1979, Thibault entered into the employ of the Los Angeles Lakers of the National Basketball Association, for whom he worked first as a scout and, after 1980, as director of scouting and as an assistant coach; during Thibault's tenure, the Lakers twice won the league championship.

Thibault left the Lakers for the Chicago Bulls in 1982 and remained with the latter organization through the 1985-86 season, serving as an assistant coach and director of scouting; under Thibault, the team drafted shooting guard Michael Jordan and power forward Charles Oakley and acquired John Paxson, each of whom would contribute to the Bulls' earning six league championships between 1991 and 1999.

Thibault left the NBA for the World Basketball League in 1988 and served for two seasons as the head coach and franchise general manager for the Calgary 88's, winning the league's coach of the year award in 1988.

In 1989, Thibault began an eight-year stint as general manager and head coach of the Omaha Racers of the Continental Basketball Association, in which capacity he led the team to the league playoffs in each season; his team claimed the 1993 championship and once more reached the league finals one year thence.

Contemporaneously, Thibault worked for USA Basketball as a coach for the United States national team, leading the national side to a gold medal at the 1993 FIBA World Championship qualifying tournament and a silver medal at the 1995 Pan American Games.

Thibault returned to the NBA during the league's 1997-98 season and, through 2003, served as a scout and assistant coach for each of the Atlanta Hawks, New York Knicks, and Seattle SuperSonics; most prominently, Thibault spent four seasons with the Milwaukee Bucks as an advisor and assistant to George Karl.

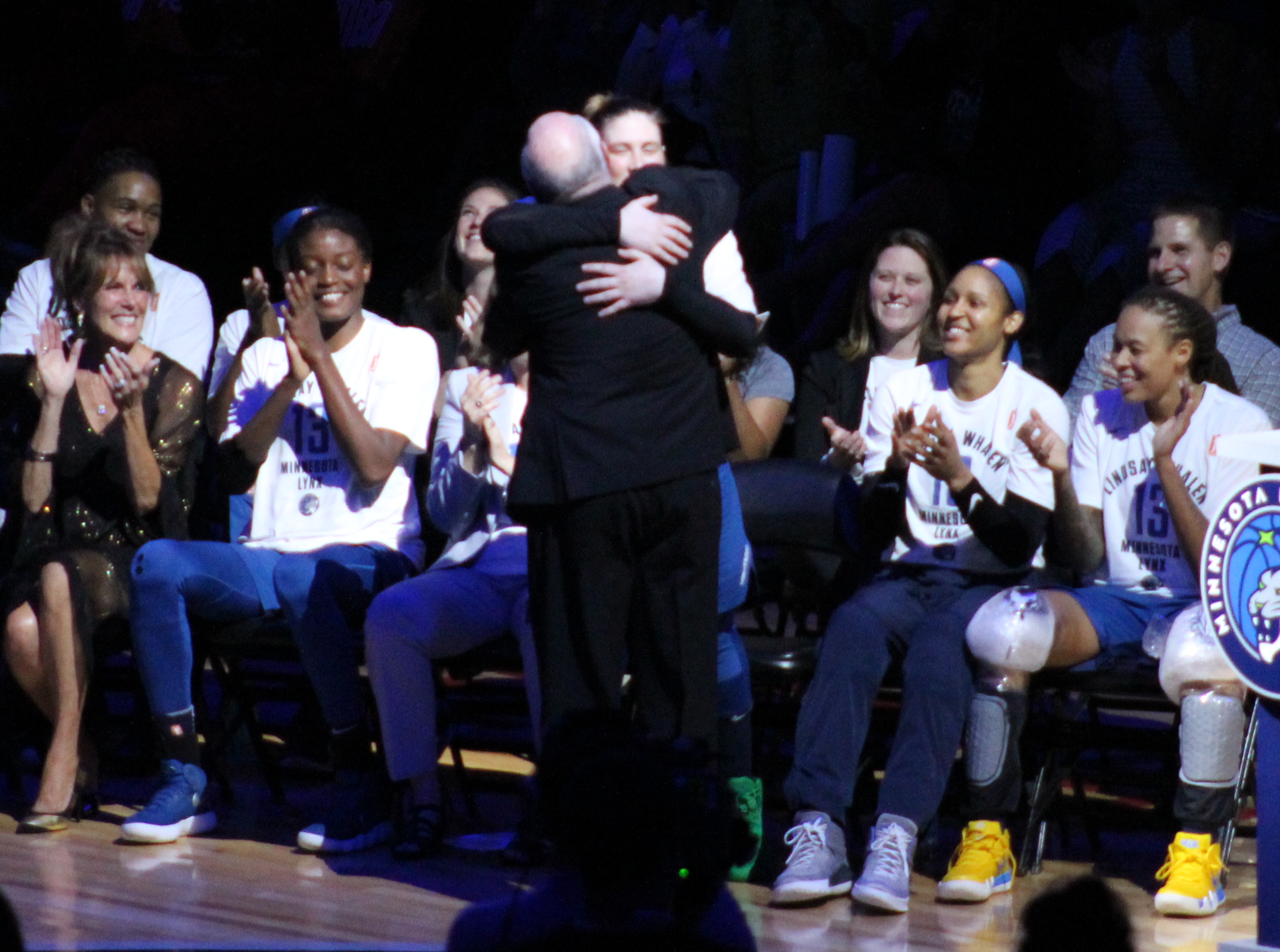
Wearing a University of Minnesota tie, Thibault hugs Lindsay Whalen at her retirement in 2018

Thibault was hired by the Sun in March 2003 to replace Dee Brown; Thibault garnered the WNBA Coach of the Year Award subsequent to the 2006 season, when he led the Sun to the Eastern Conference finals. Thibault would again win the award in 2008 with the Sun.

On December 18, 2012, Thibault was introduced as the new head coach & general manager of the Washington Mystics. He led a revival of the team, getting them to the playoffs and earning a win there for the first time since 2004. For his efforts, Thibault once again earned the Coach of the Year award, joining Van Chancellor as the only coaches to win the award three times.

On July 7, 2018, when the Mystics beat the Los Angeles Sparks, Thibault became the first WNBA coach to reach 300 wins.

In 2019, Thibault finally won his first WNBA championship as a head coach. He guided the Mystics to the team's first-ever championship in the 2019 WNBA Finals, as they defeated the Connecticut Sun. After the 2022 season, Thibault retired as head coach of the Mystics but remained general manager. His son, Eric, succeeded him as head coach. Both were relieved of their duties on October 23, 2024, following the WNBA season.

== Basketball ==
=== USA ===
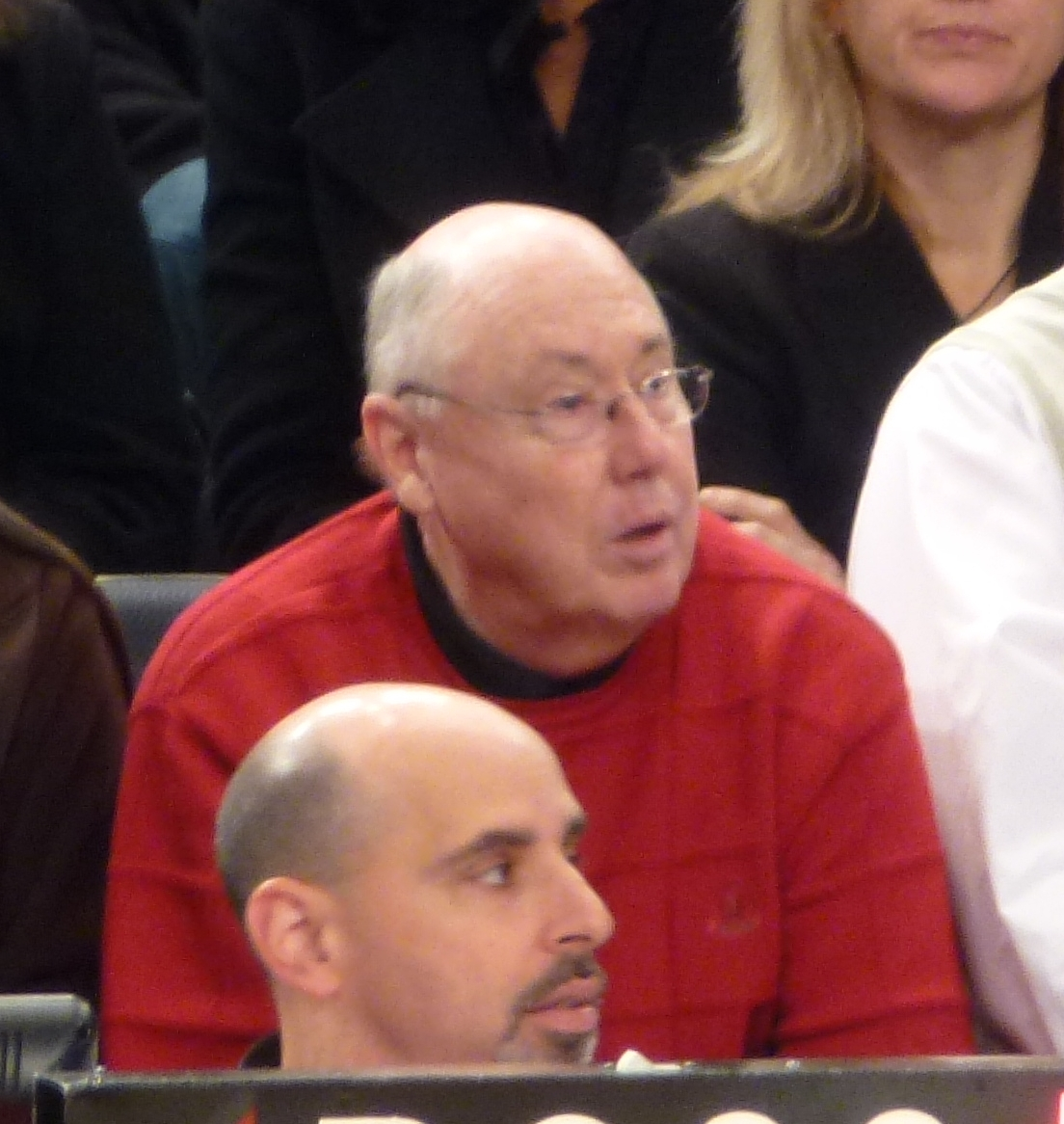
Thibault in 2011

Thibault served as an assistant coach for the USA National team in 2006, a team in transition. Lisa Leslie, who had led the team in scoring in the 2004 Olympics, the 2002 World Championships, the 2000 Olympics, the 1998 World Championships, and the 1996 Olympics was no longer on the team. Sheryl Swoopes was available but hampered by injuries, with Staley transitioning from player to coach. Newcomers Sue Bird, Candace Parker and Diana Taurasi picked up the slack, but it was a team in transition. As an additional challenge, some members of the squad were unable to join the team for practices due to WNBA commitments. The team started out strong, winning each of the six preliminary games, including the game against Russia. In the quarterfinals, the USA team beat Spain 90–56. The semifinal was a rematch against Russia, but this time the Russian team prevailed, 75–68. The USA faced Brazil in the bronze medal game, and won easily 99–59.

=== Belgium ===
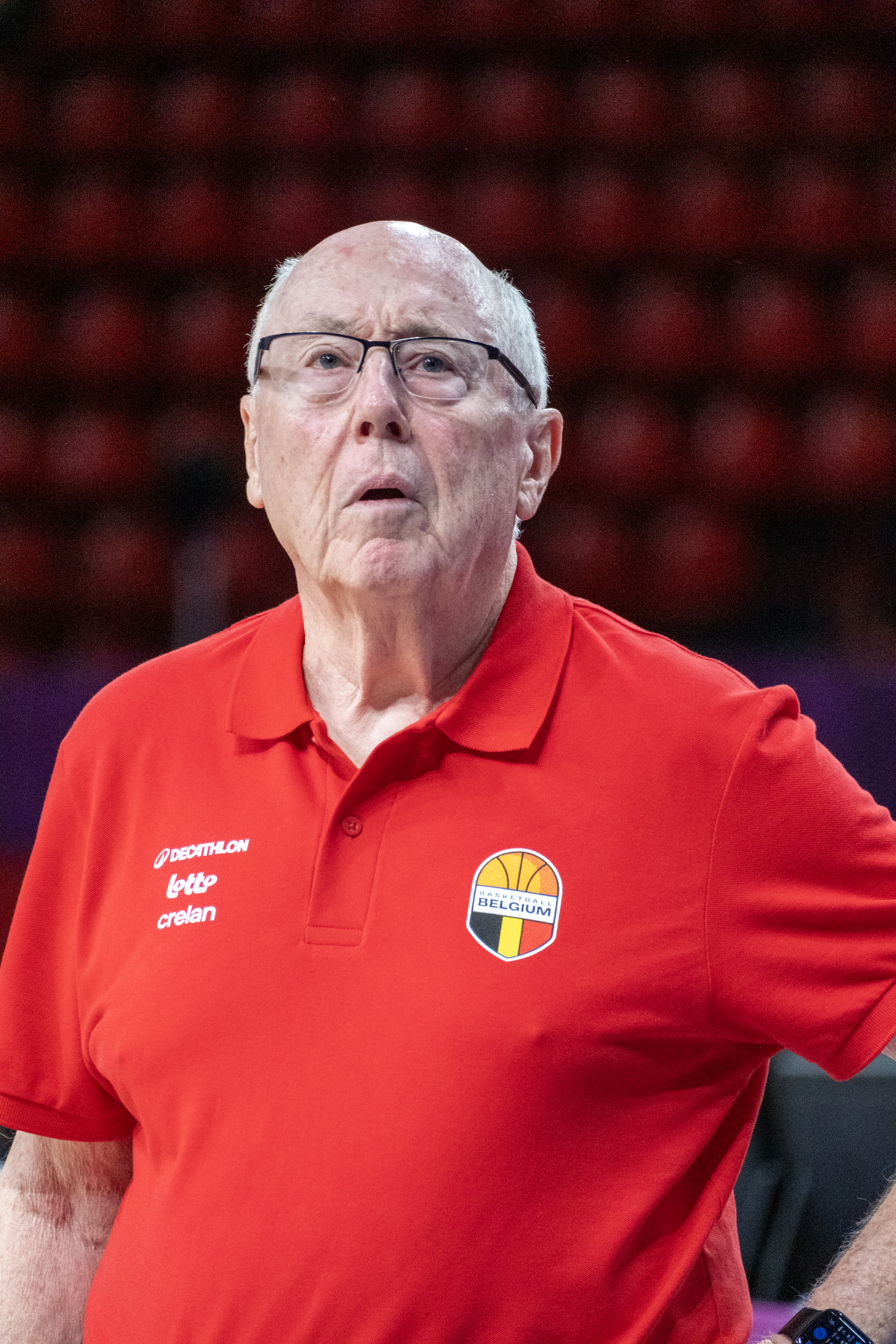
Thibault as head coach of Belgium at the 2025 Women's European Basketball Championship

At the end of January 2025 Thibault was contracted to be head coach of the Belgian women's national basketball team Belgian Cats. He has to lead the team to the 2028 Summer Olympics in Los Angeles. He succeeded Rachid Meziane, who had taken a position with the American Women's National Basketball Association's Connecticut Sun, a club that Thibault had previously coached. In June 2025 he coached the Belgian Cats to their second European title at the EuroBasket Women 2025.

== Personal ==
Thibault grew up in Hastings, Minnesota. At age six, he moved to the South San Francisco Bay Area. He attended Bellarmine College Preparatory in Santa Clara and then studied at San José State University, Santa Clara University and Saint Martin's College. In 2023, he was inducted into the Bellarmine College Preparatory Hall of Fame.

Thibault and his wife, Nanci, have two children. Their son, Eric, succeeded his father as head coach of the Mystics, serving in that role from 2023 to 2024. Their daughter, Carly, was named head coach at Fairfield University on April 11, 2022.

== Coaching Record ==
Legend
Regular season	G	Games coached	W	Games won	L	Games lost	W–L %	Win–loss %
Playoffs	PG	Playoff games	PW	Playoff wins	PL	Playoff losses	PW–L %	Playoff win–loss %

Team	Year	G	W	L	W–L%	Finish	PG	PW	PL	PW–L%	Result
CON	2003	34	18	16	.529	3rd in East	4	2	2	.500	Lost in Conference finals
CON	2004	34	18	16	.529	1st in East	8	5	3	.625	Lost in WNBA Finals
CON	2005	34	26	8	.765	1st in East	8	5	3	.625	Lost in WNBA Finals
CON	2006	34	26	8	.765	1st in East	5	3	2	.600	Lost in Conference finals
CON	2007	34	18	16	.529	3rd in East	3	1	2	.333	Lost in Conference semifinals
CON	2008	34	21	13	.618	2nd in East	3	1	2	.333	Lost in Conference semifinals
CON	2009	34	16	18	.471	6th in East	—	—	—	—	Missed Playoffs
CON	2010	34	17	17	.500	5th in East	—	—	—	—	Missed Playoffs
CON	2011	34	21	13	.618	2nd in East	2	0	2	.000	Lost in Conference semifinals
CON	2012	34	25	9	.735	1st in East	5	3	2	.600	Lost in Conference finals
WAS	2013	34	17	17	.500	3rd in East	3	1	2	.333	Lost in Conference semifinals
WAS	2014	34	16	18	.471	3rd in East	2	0	2	.000	Lost in Conference semifinals
WAS	2015	34	18	16	.529	4th in East	3	1	2	.333	Lost in Conference semifinals
WAS	2016	34	13	21	.382	6th in East	-	-	-	-	Missed Playoffs
WAS	2017	34	18	16	.529	3rd in East	5	2	3	.400	Lost in Semifinals
WAS	2018	34	22	12	.647	2nd in East	9	4	5	.444	Lost in WNBA Finals
WAS	2019	34	26	8	.765	1st in East	9	6	3	.667	Won WNBA Championship
WAS	2020	22	9	13	.409	3rd in East	1	0	1	.000	Lost in First round
WAS	2021	32	12	20	.375	4th in East	-	-	-	–	Missed Playoffs
WAS	2022	36	22	14	.611	3rd in East	0	0	2	.000	Lost in First round
Career		688	379	289	.567		72	34	38	.472	
