= 2004 Minnesota Lynx season =

- Head coach: Suzie McConnell Serio
- Arena: Target Center

Results
- Record: 18–16 (.529)
- Place: 3rd (Western)
- Playoff finish: Lost First Round (2-0) to Seattle Storm

The 2004 Minnesota Lynx season was the 6th season for the Minnesota Lynx of the Women's National Basketball Association, and the second season under head coach Suzie McConnell Serio.

The season tipped-off on Thursday, May 20, 2004, in Seattle against the Seattle Storm. The Lynx qualified for their second consecutive playoff berth, but lost in the opening round to eventual champion Seattle Storm.

== Offseason ==
=== Dispersal Draft ===
Based on the Lynx's 2003 record, they would pick 7th in the Cleveland Rockers dispersal draft. The Lynx picked Helen Darling.

=== WNBA draft ===
Round	Pick	Player	Nationality	School/Club team
1	6	Nicole Ohlde (C)	United States	Kansas State
1	7	Vanessa Hayden (C)	United States	Florida
2	20	Tasha Butts (F)	United States	Tennessee
3	33	Amber Jacobs (G)	United States	Boston College
3	38	Kate Bulger (G)	United States	West Virginia

== Regular season ==
=== Season standings ===
Western Conference	W	L	PCT	GB	Home	Road	Conf.
Los Angeles Sparks ^{x}	25	9	.735	–	15–2	10–7	16–6
Seattle Storm ^{x}	20	14	.588	5.0	13–4	7–10	13–9
Minnesota Lynx ^{x}	18	16	.529	7.0	11–6	7–10	12–10
Sacramento Monarchs ^{x}	18	16	.529	7.0	10–7	8–9	12–10
Phoenix Mercury ^{o}	17	17	.500	8.0	10–7	7–10	11–11
Houston Comets ^{o}	13	21	.382	12.0	9–8	4–13	7–15
San Antonio Silver Stars ^{o}	9	25	.265	16.0	6–11	3–14	6–16

=== Season schedule ===
Date	Opponent	Score	Result	Record
May 20	@ Seattle	85-88	Loss	0-1
May 22	@ Sacramento	69-61	Win	1-1
May 26	@ San Antonio	44-56	Loss	1-2
May 28	Washington	73-62	Win	2-2
May 30	New York	64-68	Loss	2-3
June 3	San Antonio	55-47	Win	3-3
June 5	Phoenix	76-68	Win	4-3
June 11	@ Los Angeles	55-69	Loss	4-4
June 17	Sacramento	50-60	Loss	4-5
June 19	Houston	66-58	Win	5-5
June 22	@ Phoenix	46-69	Loss	5-6
June 24	@ San Antonio	57-70	Loss	5-7
June 27	Los Angeles	67-83	Loss	5-8
June 30	Houston	58-50 (OT)	Win	6-8
July 3	Detroit	78-70	Win	7-8
July 8	@ Indiana	56-58	Loss	7-9
July 9	Phoenix	61-59	Win	8-9
July 11	Sacramento	83-73 (OT)	Win	9-9
July 14	Connecticut	66-63	Win	10-9
July 15	@ New York	69-66	Win	11-9
July 18	@ Phoenix	63-60	Win	12-9
July 22	@ Connecticut	68-52	Win	13-9
July 23	@ Washington	61-65	Loss	13-10
July 28	San Antonio	66-53	Win	14-10
July 30	Seattle	55-70	Loss	14-11
August 1	@ Detroit	59-58	Win	15-11
September 1	@ Houston	72-64	Win	16-11
September 3	Indiana	61-69	Loss	16-12
September 8	Charlotte	68-72	Loss	16-13
September 10	Seattle	64-61	Win	17-13
September 11	@ Charlotte	50-60	Loss	17-14
September 14	@ Houston	59-70	Loss	17-15
September 17	@ Los Angeles	78-66	Win	18-15
September 19	@ Sacramento	63-72	Loss	18-16

== Playoffs ==
Game	Date	Opponent	Score	Result	Record
Western Conference Semifinals
1	September 25	Seattle	58-70	Loss	0-1
2	September 27	@ Seattle	54-64	Loss	0-2

== Player stats ==
Player	Games played	Rebounds	Assists	Steals	Block	Points
Katie Smith	23	84	52	23	6	432
Nicole Ohlde	34	194	60	16	45	397
Tamika Raymond	34	205	38	39	5	254
Teresa Edwards	34	90	79	47	8	194
Vanessa Hayden	29	84	7	7	29	153
Svetlana Abrosimova	22	74	45	30	2	146
Helen Darling	33	67	115	30	4	140
Amanda Lassiter	33	80	37	21	22	127
Stacey Lovelace	34	66	20	18	9	121
Amber Jacobs	32	36	47	13	0	101
Tasha Butts	30	62	25	13	7	76
Michele Van Gorp	8	13	1	0	1	22
Gwen Slaughter	3	1	0	0	1	2

== Awards and honors ==
- Teresa Edwards, Kim Perrot Sportsmanship Award
- Suzie McConnell Serio, WNBA Coach of the Year Award
