= Betty Lennox =

American basketball player (born 1976)

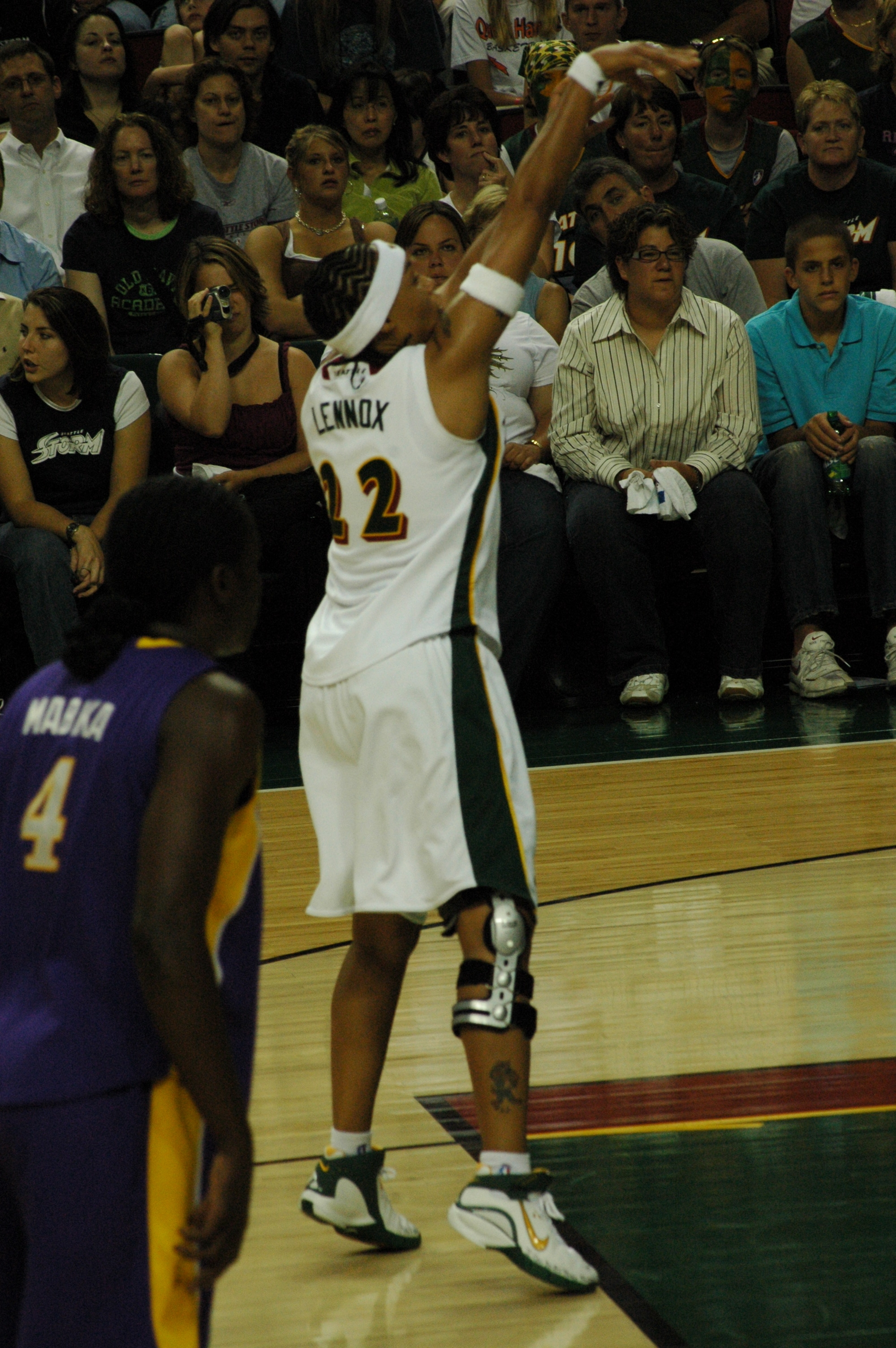
- Lennox as a member of the Seattle Storm

Personal information
- Born: December 4, 1976 (age 49) Oklahoma City, Oklahoma, U.S.
- Listed height: 5 ft 8 in (1.73 m)
- Listed weight: 143 lb (65 kg)

Career information
- High school: Fort Osage (Independence, Missouri)
- College: Butler CC (1995–1996); Trinity Valley CC (1996–1997); Louisiana Tech (1998–2000)
- WNBA draft: 2000: 1st round, 6th overall pick
- Drafted by: Minnesota Lynx
- Playing career: 2000–2011
- Position: Shooting guard
- Number: 22, 7

Career history
- 2000–2002: Minnesota Lynx
- 2000–2001: Elitzur Holon
- 2002: Miami Sol
- 2003: Cleveland Rockers
- 2004–2007: Seattle Storm
- 2004–2005: Coconuda Maddaloni
- 2005–2006: Beijing Great Wall
- 2006–2007: Lotos Gdynia
- 2007–2008: K.V. Imperial EKA AEL Limassol
- 2008: Atlanta Dream
- 2008–2009: Nadezhda Orenburg
- 2009–2010: Los Angeles Sparks
- 2010: Tarsus Belediyes
- 2011: Tulsa Shock

Career highlights
- WNBA champion (2004); WNBA Finals MVP (2004); WNBA Rookie of the Year (2000); WNBA All-Star (2000); All-WNBA Second Team (2000); Polish Cup winner (2007); All-American – USBWA (2000); Third-team All-American – AP (2000); Sun Belt Player of the Year (2000); Sun Belt Tournament MVP (2000); All-Sun Belt (2000)
- Stats at WNBA.com
- Stats at Basketball Reference

Betty Bernice Lennox (born December 4, 1976) is an American retired professional basketball player. She played for the Minnesota Lynx, Miami Sol, Cleveland Rockers, Seattle Storm, Atlanta Dream, Los Angeles Sparks and Tulsa Shock in the Women's National Basketball Association (WNBA). Her nicknames include "Betty Basketball," "Betty Big Buckets," and her most popular nickname "B-Money."

== Childhood ==
Born in Oklahoma City, Oklahoma, Lennox grew up in the small town of Grant. Daughter of Bernice Jefferies and A. B. Lennox, and was raised by her mother primarily. She was the eighth of nine children and the youngest daughter in the family. She has five brothers, named Freddy, Karl, A. B., Alfred, and Charles. She also has three sisters named Lela, Ruby, and Victoria, all of them older than she is. She learned to play basketball with her four older brothers and one younger, who did not cut her any slack because she was a girl. She would learn to not be intimated by others while playing with her brothers as a child. She also developed her work ethic from growing up on a farm with her family. She was loading bales by age ten, each bale weighing 30 to 40 pounds, and did many daily chores while in primary school in Grant. Her full name is Betty Bernice Lennox, getting her middle name from her mother.

== High school career ==
Betty spent three years attending Fort Osage High School in Independence, Missouri, under the coaching of Dale Williams. Betty played her sophomore year at Grant High School in Grant, OK. She originally learned the six-player game of basketball while in Oklahoma. She struggled when her family moved to Missouri, as she was not used to crossing over the center line to be a defensive player, as she had only been an offensive player while in Oklahoma.

== College years ==
Lennox played college basketball at Trinity Valley Community College in Athens, Texas for her sophomore year. Trinity Valley was her second community college, as she originally enrolled and played her Freshman year at Butler Community College in Kansas garnering all conference honors. She would transfer to Trinity Valley CC after her freshman year in 1996. Her Cardinals Trinity Valley CC team won the 1997 NJCAA Women's Basketball Championship, an accomplishment she is most proud of. She was the MVP of the tournament, and finished the championship game with 27 points and 20 rebounds. Lennox then transferred to Louisiana Tech University, and graduated from there in 2000 with a BA in psychology. She took a year off from basketball while at LA Tech in 1998 to devote herself to her studies in order to complete her degree. She would play basketball for LA Tech for her final two years of college in 1999 & 2000. She was named the 2000 Sun Belt Conference Player of the Year and a U.S. Basketball Writers Association First Team All-American while at Louisiana Tech University.

== WNBA career ==
Lennox was selected by the Minnesota Lynx as the sixth overall pick in the 2000 WNBA draft and later became the WNBA's Rookie of the Year in 2000. She was also the first rookie to ever play in a WNBA All-Star Game that same year. She also made the All-WNBA 2nd Team in 2000 as well. She broke her hip in 2001, and was originally told that her basketball career would be over after the injury. With the work ethic she learned as a child, she fought back from her injury to come back and continued to thrive as a player.

On June 13, 2002, the Minnesota Lynx traded Lennox along with a 2003 first-round draft pick to the Miami Sol in exchange for Tamara Moore and a 2003 second-round draft pick. After the 2002 season ended, the Miami Sol folded and Lennox was selected by the Cleveland Rockers in the dispersal draft. When the Rockers folded after the 2003 season ended, Lennox went through another dispersal draft before the 2004 season. This time, she was selected by the Seattle Storm.

Playing alongside Sue Bird and Lauren Jackson, Lennox helped lead the Seattle Storm to the 2004 WNBA Championship against the Connecticut Sun, winning 2–1 in the series. She was named the Finals Most Valuable Player, averaging 22.3 points per game during the series en route to winning the award. In 2005 with the Seattle Storm, Lennox made her 200th career three-pointer.

On February 6, 2008, Lennox was selected by the newly formed Atlanta Dream in the expansion draft. During the 2008 season with the Dream, Lennox averaged a career-high 17.5 points per game and scored a career-high 44 points against the Connecticut Sun. She was the Eastern Conference leading point scorer for the year. She reached the 3,000 point and 1,000 rebound milestones in the 2008 season as well.

Lennox was acquired by the Los Angeles Sparks for the 2009 season as an unrestricted free agent to join forces with Candace Parker, Lisa Leslie and Tina Thompson. Lennox helped lead the Sparks to the Western Conference finals where they were one win shy of advancing to the 2009 WNBA Finals, losing 2–1 to the Phoenix Mercury who ended up being the champions. During the 2010 season, a left knee injury would sideline Lennox while playing with the Sparks for the remainder of the season after playing only 11 games.

Lennox signed with the Tulsa Shock for the 2011 season, then waived before the start of the season, later re-signed for the remainder of the 2011 season, playing only 9 games. She would be sidelined for the later part of the season with a concussion. The 2011 season would be Lennox's last season in the WNBA before retiring. Lennox played a total of 12 seasons in the WNBA.

== Overseas career ==
Lennox has played overseas for a total of 7 off-season years during her 12-year career with the WNBA. She has been known to play internationally during the off season with the WNBA, playing for many teams throughout the world. Additional teams and countries have included Israeli League for the 2000–2001 off-season for Elitzur Holon. She played in Turkey in 2010 for Tarsus Belediyes. She played for Nadezhda Orenburg in Russia in 2008 & 2009 WNBA off-seasons. Earlier teams have included Coconuda Maddaloni in Italy for 2004–2005. She was in Poland with Lotos Gdynia in 2006–2007. She had been with K.V. Imperial EKA AEL Limassol in Greece during 2007–2008. While in Poland in 2007 her team was the regular season runner-up, and a finalist. In Cyprus during 2007–2008 her team was the regular season champion in 2007 and as well as championship winners, and Cyprus Cup Winner in 2008. She was also Eurobasket.com's All-Russian superleague Honorable Mention in 2009. She also played for Beijing Great Wall in China during 2005–2006.

== Philanthropy ==
Lennox started the Lennox Foundation 22 in 2005 to support children who were victims of neglect and abuse. The organization's mission is to give these children better experiences and the chance to succeed with support, education, and love. They learn self-motivation through playing basketball. She was presented with the WNBA's Community Assist Award in June 2006 for her charitable work.

== Life after basketball ==
Since retiring from professional basketball, Lennox has been a basketball trainer for college students. She also travels nationwide to do motivational speaking and youth mentoring through her foundation. In March 2016, Lennox won the award for Woman of the Year at the 2016 Women of Distinction Awards.

== Personal life ==
Lennox is also a Christian who comes from a deeply religious background and had a bible verse inscribed on the toes of her shoes that she wore during games (Philippians 4:13) which she says is the scripture that tells all about her life journey.

== Career statistics ==
=== WNBA ===
Legend
GP	Games played	GS	Games started	MPG	Minutes per game	RPG	Rebounds per game
APG	Assists per game	SPG	Steals per game	BPG	Blocks per game	PPG	Points per game
TO	Turnovers per game	FG%	Field-goal percentage	3P%	3-point field-goal percentage	FT%	Free-throw percentage
**Bold**	Career best	°	League leader

†	Denotes seasons in which Lennox won a WNBA championship

=== Regular season ===
Year	Team	GP	GS	MPG	FG%	3P%	FT%	RPG	APG	SPG	BPG	TO	PPG
2000	Minnesota	32	31	**30.8**	.427	**.396**	.800	**5.6**	2.6	**1.6**	0.2	3.0	16.9
2001	Minnesota	11	7	21.9	.373	.385	**.950**	4.9	1.5	0.9	**0.3**	2.2	11.0
2002*	Minnesota	5	1	27.6	.208	.217	.600	3.2	3.2	1.0	0.0	4.0	6.2
2002*	Miami	26	3	22.3	.358	.351	.759	2.8	1.8	0.9	0.1	2.3	11.9
2002	Total	31	4	24.9	.283	.284	.679	3.0	2.1	0.9	0.0	3.2	9.1
2003	Cleveland	**34**	1	16.5	.372	.311	.722	2.6	0.9	0.4	0.1	1.7	7.6
2004^{†}	Seattle	32	32	28.8	.421	.265	.853	5.0	2.5	1.0	0.0	2.4	11.2
2005	Seattle	28	26	28.6	.392	.308	.874	4.4	2.0	1.2	0.1	2.6	12.4
2006	Seattle	**34**	**34**	26.1	**.452**	.322	.761	4.0	2.1	1.0	0.1	2.8	13.7
2007	Seattle	**34**	**34**	27.6	.428	.343	.909	4.7	**2.7**	1.0	0.1	2.6	13.4
2008	Atlanta	**34**	33	29.7	.415	.358	.855	4.2	2.4	1.3	0.0	3.3	**17.5**
2009	Los Angeles	30	13	21.3	.414	.301	.894	4.5	1.8	0.8	0.1	2.3	10.2
2010	Los Angeles	11	0	11.6	.391	.361	.833	1.7	1.5	0.1	0.0	**0.6**	4.9
2011	Tulsa	9	0	6.1	.174	.235	.833	0.9	0.6	0.2	0.0	**0.6**	1.9
Career	12 years, 7 teams	320	215	24.6	.406	.335	.838	4.1	2.0	1.0	0.1	2.5	12.1

=== Playoffs ===
Year	Team	GP	GS	MPG	FG%	3P%	FT%	RPG	APG	SPG	BPG	TO	PPG
2003	Cleveland	3	0	15.0	**.474**	.400	.500	2.3	1.0	1.0	0.0	**1.3**	7.0
2004^{†}	Seattle	**8**	**8**	**31.4**	.454	**.444**	.875	3.6	2.6	1.0	**0.1**	2.8	14.6
2005	Seattle	3	3	31.3	.395	.250	.929	4.7	2.7	1.0	0.0	2.0	15.3
2006	Seattle	3	3	30.0	.295	.263	.571	5.7	**5.0**	**1.6**	0.0	2.6	11.7
2007	Seattle	2	2	31.0	.361	.385	**1.000**	**6.5**	2.0	1.0	0.0	2.0	**18.0**
2009	Los Angeles	6	0	21.3	.414	.440	**1.000**	3.0	1.5	0.8	0.0	1.8	12.3
Career	6 years, 3 teams	25	16	26.8	.404	.370	.881	3.9	2.4	1.0	0.0	2.2	13.2

=== College ===
Year	Team	GP	GS	MPG	FG%	3P%	FT%	RPG	APG	SPG	BPG	TO	PPG
1998–99	Louisiana Tech	33	-	-	**60.9**	29.5	63.5	4.1	1.8	1.6	0.2	-	10.1
1999–00	Louisiana Tech	**34**	-	-	44.1	**38.0**	**78.2**	**5.9**	**3.4**	**2.9**	0.2	-	**17.3**
**Career**		67	-	-	49.1	35.1	72.3	5.0	2.6	2.3	0.2	-	13.7
Statistics retrieved from Sports-Reference.
