= 2004 WNBA draft =

U.S. women's basketball player selection

General information
- Sport: Basketball
- Date: April 17, 2004
- Location: Secaucus, New Jersey

Overview
- League: WNBA
- Merging teams: Cleveland Rockers (folded in 2003)
- First selection: Diana Taurasi; Phoenix Mercury

The 2004 WNBA draft was the eighth draft in the WNBA's history. It took place on April 17, 2004, at the NBA Entertainment Studios in Secaucus, NJ.

Additionally, on January 6, 2004, the WNBA held a dispersal draft to re-assign players from the Cleveland Rockers who folded at the end of 2003 WNBA season.

== Key ==
!	Denotes player who has been inducted to the Naismith Basketball Hall of Fame
^	Denotes player who has been inducted to the Women's Basketball Hall of Fame
*	Denotes player who has been selected for at least one All-Star Game and All-WNBA Team
^{+}	Denotes player who has been selected for at least one All-Star Game
^{#}	Denotes player who never played in the WNBA regular season or playoffs
**Bold**	Denotes player who won Rookie of the Year

== Draft ==
=== Round 1 ===
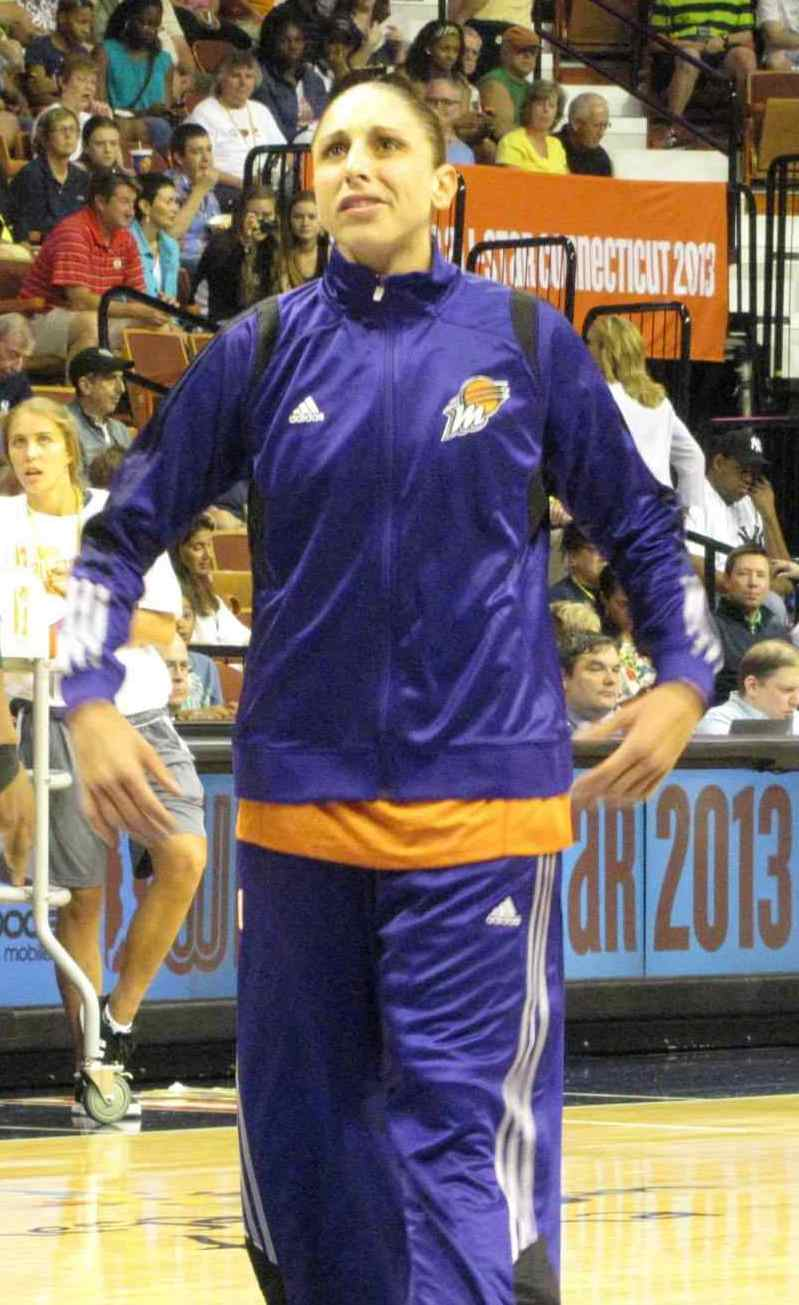
Diana Taurasi was selected first overall by the Phoenix Mercury.

Pick	Player	Position	Nationality	Team	School / club team
1	**Diana Taurasi** *	G	United States	Phoenix Mercury	Connecticut
2	Alana Beard *	G	United States	Washington Mystics	Duke
3	Nicole Powell ^{+}	G/F	United States	Charlotte Sting (from Indiana)	Stanford
4	Lindsay Whalen * ^ !	G	United States	Connecticut Sun (from San Antonio)	Minnesota
5	Shameka Christon ^{+}	G/F	United States	New York Liberty	Arkansas
6	Nicole Ohlde	C	United States	Minnesota Lynx (from Seattle)	Kansas State
7	Vanessa Hayden	C	United States	Minnesota Lynx	Florida
8	Chandi Jones	G/F	United States	Phoenix Mercury	Houston
9	Ebony Hoffman	C	United States	Indiana Fever (from Charlotte)	USC
10	Rebekkah Brunson ^{+}	F	United States	Sacramento Monarchs	Georgetown
11	Iciss Tillis	C/F	United States	Detroit Shock (from Houston)	Duke
12	Christi Thomas	F	United States	Los Angeles Sparks	Georgia
13	Shereka Wright	F	United States	Detroit Shock	Purdue

=== Round 2 ===
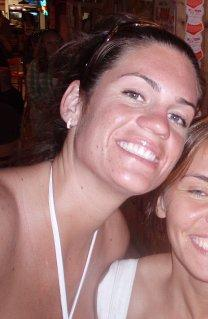
Lindsay Taylor the 26th pick of the Houston Comets.

Pick	Player	Position	Nationality	Team	School / club team
14	Ashley Robinson	C	United States	Phoenix Mercury	Tennessee
15	Kaayla Chones	C	United States	Washington Mystics	NC State
16	Jessica Brungo	F	United States	Connecticut Sun (from San Antonio)	Penn State
17	Amisha Carter	C	United States	New York Liberty	Louisiana Tech
18	Kelly Mazzante	F	United States	Charlotte Sting (from Indiana)	Penn State
19	Trina Frierson	F	United States	Seattle Storm	Louisiana Tech
20	Tasha Butts	F	United States	Minnesota Lynx	Tennessee
21	Cindy Dallas ^{#}	F	United States	San Antonio Silver Stars (from Connecticut)	Illinois
22	Jenni Benningfield	F	United States	Charlotte Sting	Vanderbilt
23	Erika Valek ^{#}	G	Colombia	Detroit Shock (from Sacramento)	Purdue
24	Ugo Oha ^{#}	C	Nigeria	Connecticut Sun (from Houston)	George Washington
25	Doneeka Hodges	G	United States	Los Angeles Sparks	LSU
26	Lindsay Taylor (traded to Phoenix)	C	United States	Houston Comets (from Detroit)	UC Santa Barbara

=== Round 3 ===
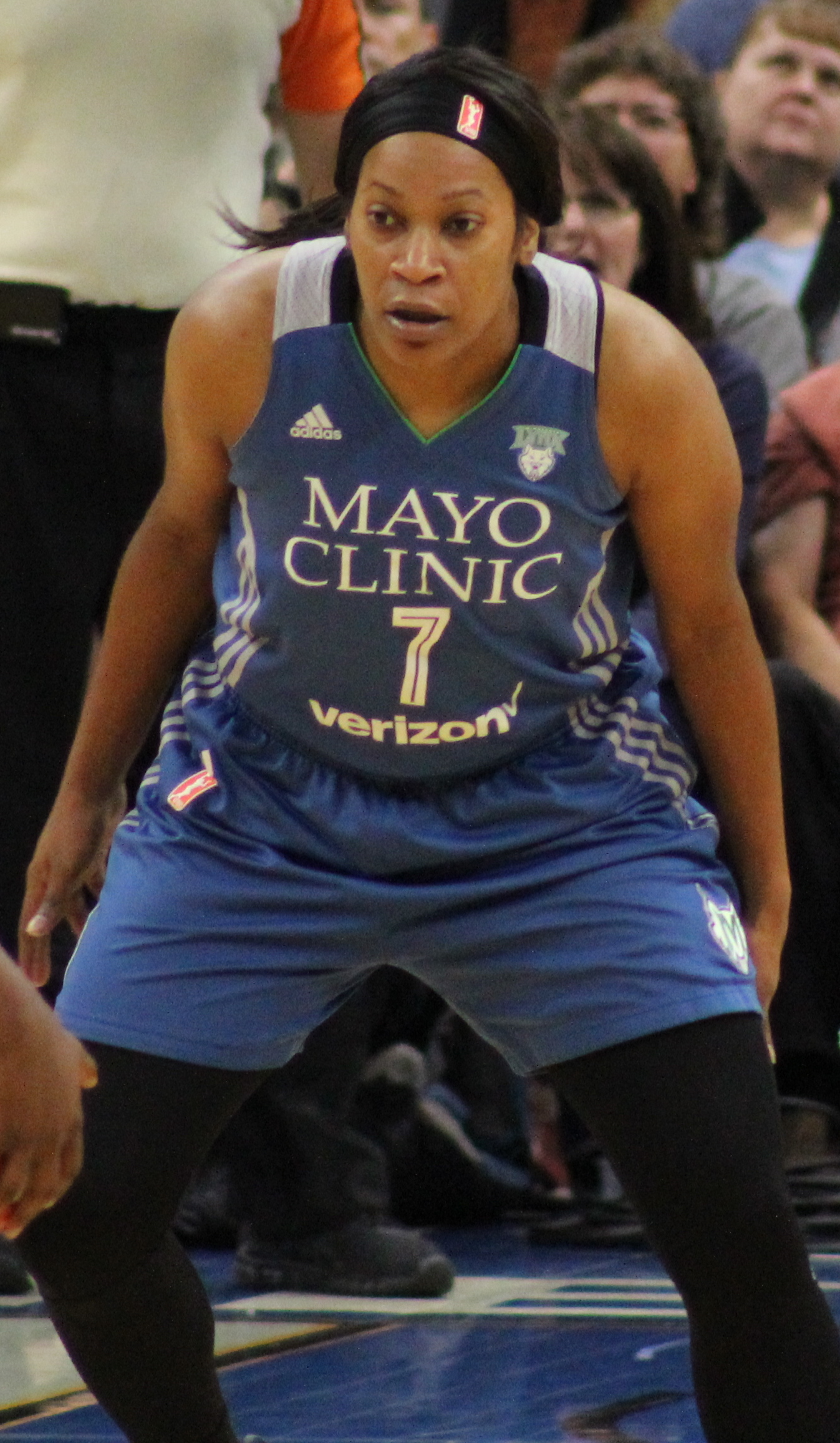
Jia Perkins the 35th pick of the Charlotte Sting.

Pick	Player	Position	Nationality	Team	School / club team
27	Maria Villarroel ^{#} (traded to Houston)	G	Venezuela	Phoenix Mercury	Oklahoma
28	Evan Unrau ^{#}	F	United States	Washington Mystics	Missouri
29	Candace Futrell	G	United States	Connecticut Sun (from San Antonio)	Duquesne
30	Catherine Joens	G	United States	New York Liberty	George Washington
31	Ieva Kubliņa ^{#}	F/C	Latvia	Indiana Fever	Virginia Tech
32	Jennifer Smith	C	United States	Detroit Shock (from Seattle, via Houston)	Michigan
33	Amber Jacobs	G	United States	Minnesota Lynx	Boston College
34	Toccara Williams	G	United States	San Antonio Silver Stars (from Connecticut)	Texas A&M
35	Jia Perkins ^{+}	G	United States	Charlotte Sting	Texas Tech
36	Nuria Martínez	F	Spain	Sacramento Monarchs	Avenida (Spain)
37	Stacy Stephens	C	United States	Houston Comets	Texas
38	Kate Bulger ^{#}	G	United States	Minnesota Lynx (from Detroit)	West Virginia

== See also ==
- List of first overall WNBA draft picks
