= 2004 Connecticut Sun season =

- Head coach: Mike Thibault
- Arena: Mohegan Sun Arena

Results
- Record: 18–16 (.529)
- Place: 1st (Eastern)
- Playoff finish: Lost in WNBA Finals

The 2004 WNBA season was their sixth season and their second in Connecticut. The Sun attempted to return to the postseason for the second consecutive season and were successful.

== Offseason ==
=== Dispersal Draft ===
Based on the Sun's 2003 record, they would pick 8th in the Cleveland Rockers dispersal draft. However, the Sun traded the pick to the Houston Comets.

=== WNBA draft ===
Round	Pick	Player	Nationality	School/Team/Country
1	4	Lindsay Whalen	United States	Minnesota
2	16	Jessica Brungo	United States	Penn State
2	24	Ugo Oha	United States	George Washington University
3	29	Candace Futrell	United States	Duquesne

=== Transactions ===
- May 19: The Sun waived Courtney Colman.
- May 18: The Sun waived Anna Zimerle, Ugo Oha, and Anastasia Kostaki.
- May 12: The Sun waived Courtney Mix and Katie MacFarlane.
- May 10: The Sun waived Brina Chaney and Brianne Stepherson.
- May 4: The Sun waived Texlin Quinney, Jamila Wideman, and Isabel Stubbs.
- April 26: The Sun signed Brina Chaney, Katie MacFarlane, Le'Coe Willingham, Jennifer Derevjanik, Courtney Mix, and Texlin Quinney.
- April 20: The Sun waived Adrienne Johnson.
- April 19: The Sun waived Jamila Wideman.
- April 16: The Sun signed Isabel Stubbs.
- April 9: The Sun signed Wendy Palmer-Daniel, Brianne Stepherson, Anna Zimerle, and Anastasia Kostaki.
- March 25: The Sun acquired Asjha Jones from the Washington Mystics. The Washington Mystics acquired Tamicha Jackson from the Phoenix Mercury. The Phoenix Mercury acquired the 8th pick in the 2004 WNBA Draft from the Sun.
- January 28: The Sun traded Shannon Johnson and their 21st and 34th picks in the 2004 WNBA Draft to the Silver Stars in exchange for San Antonio's 4th, 16th, 29th picks in the 2004 WNBA Draft.
- January 5: The Sun traded the eighth pick in the 2004 WNBA Dispersal Draft to the Houston Comets in exchange for a second-round pick in the 2004 collegiate draft.

== Roster ==
2004 Connecticut Sun roster
Players
Coaches

Pos.	No.	Nat.	Name	Height	Weight	From
G	24	(United States)	Black, Debbie	5' 3" (1.6m)	124 lb (56kg)	Saint Joseph's
F	22	(United States)	Brungo, Jessica	6' 1" (1.85m)	165 lb (75kg)	Penn State
G	34	(United States)	Derevjanik, Jennifer	5' 10" (1.78m)	140 lb (64kg)	George Mason
G/F	32	(United States)	Douglas, Katie	6' 0" (1.83m)	165 lb (75kg)	Purdue
G	12	(United States)	Futrell, Candace	5' 10" (1.78m)	154 lb (70kg)	Duquesne
F	15	(United States)	Jones, Asjha	6' 2" (1.88m)	196 lb (89kg)	Connecticut
F/C	11	(United States)	McWilliams-Franklin, Taj (C)	6' 2" (1.88m)	184 lb (83kg)	St. Edward's College
F	3	(United States)	Palmer-Daniel, Wendy	6' 2" (1.88m)	165 lb (75kg)	Virginia
G/F	42	(United States)	Sales, Nykesha (C)	6' 0" (1.83m)	175 lb (79kg)	Connecticut
G	13	(United States)	Whalen, Lindsay	5' 8" (1.73m)	150 lb (68kg)	Minnesota
F	43	(United States)	Willingham, Le'Coe	6' 0" (1.83m)	200 lb (91kg)	Auburn
F	21	(United States)	Wyckoff, Brooke (injured)	6' 1" (1.85m)	183 lb (83kg)	Florida State

Head coach
(United States) Mike Thibault (Saint Martin's)
Assistant coaches
(United States) Scott Hawk (Nebraska-Omaha)
(United States) Bernadette Mattox (Georgia)
Athletic trainer
(United States) Jen Brodeur
Strength and conditioning coach
(United States) Lisa Ciaravella (Lynn)

Legend

- (C) Team captain
- (DP) Unsigned draft pick
- (FA) Free agent
- (S) Suspended
- Injured

== Season standings ==
Eastern Conference	W	L	PCT	GB	Home	Road	Conf.
Connecticut Sun ^{x}	18	16	.529	–	10–7	8–9	14–6
New York Liberty ^{x}	18	16	.529	–	11–6	7–10	10–10
Detroit Shock ^{x}	17	17	.500	1.0	8–9	9–8	11–9
Washington Mystics ^{x}	17	17	.500	1.0	11–6	6–11	9–11
Charlotte Sting ^{o}	16	18	.471	2.0	10–7	6–11	8–12
Indiana Fever ^{o}	15	19	.441	3.0	10–7	5–12	8–12

== Schedule ==
=== Preseason ===
2004 Game Log: Preseason

Game	Date	Opponent	Score	High points	High rebounds	High assists	Location	Record
1	May 8	Chinese National Team	L 85-87	Derevjanik (13)	Coleman (9)	()	Mohegan Sun Arena	0-1
2	May 11	@ Houston	L 71-84	Douglas, Sales (13)	Coleman (6)	()	Toyota Center	0-2
3	May 13	Los Angeles	L 51-77	Sales (12)	McWilliams-Franklin (7)	()	Mohegan Sun Arena	0-3

=== Regular season ===
2004 Game Log: Regular Season
May

Game	Date	Opponent	Score	High points	High rebounds	High assists	Location	Record
1	May 22	Phoenix	L 58-65	()	()	()	Mohegan Sun Arena	0-1
2	May 25	Houston	L 57-68	()	()	()	Mohegan Sun Arena	0-2
3	May 27	Los Angeles	W 82-73	()	()	()	Mohegan Sun Arena	1-2

June

Game	Date	Opponent	Score	High points	High rebounds	High assists	Location	Record
4	June 3	Charlotte	W 71-62	()	()	()	Mohegan Sun Arena	2-2
5	June 4	@ Washington	W 72-63	()	()	()	MCI Center	3-2
6	June 6	Detroit	L 73-74	()	()	()	Mohegan Sun Arena	3-3
7	June 9	@ Phoenix	L 59-75	()	()	()	America West Arena	3-4
8	June 11	@ Seattle	L 63-68	()	()	()	KeyArena	3-5
9	June 12	@ Sacramento	W 83-76	()	()	()	ARCO Arena	4-5
10	June 14	@ Los Angeles	L 74-76 (OT)	()	()	()	Staples Center	4-6
11	June 18	Charlotte	L 58-63 (OT)	()	()	()	Mohegan Sun Arena	4-7
12	June 20	Washington	W 75-65	()	()	()	Mohegan Sun Arena	5-7
13	June 22	@ Indiana	W 63-58	()	()	()	Conseco Fieldhouse	6-7
14	June 25	Detroit	W 71-67 (OT)	()	()	()	Mohegan Sun Arena	7-7
15	June 27	@ Detroit	W 74-72	()	()	()	Palace of Auburn Hills	8-7
16	June 30	Washington	W 78-69	()	()	()	Mohegan Sun Arena	9-7

July

Game	Date	Opponent	Score	High points	High rebounds	High assists	Location	Record
17	July 6	Indiana	W 79-67	()	()	()	Mohegan Sun Arena	10-7
18	July 9	Sacramento	L 70-85	()	()	()	Mohegan Sun Arena	10-8
19	July 11	@ Indiana	W 65-61	()	()	()	Conseco Fieldhouse	11-8
20	July 14	@ Minnesota	L 63-66	()	()	()	Target Center	11-9
21	July 15	@ San Antonio	L 67-78	()	()	()	SBC Center	11-10
22	July 17	@ Houston	L 56-72	()	()	()	Toyota Center	11-11
23	July 21	@ Detroit	W 78-68	()	()	()	Palace of Auburn Hills	12-11
24	July 22	Minnesota	L 52-68	()	()	()	Mohegan Sun Arena	12-12
25	July 24	San Antonio	W 69-55	()	()	()	Mohegan Sun Arena	13-12
26	July 30	@ Washington	L 68-69	()	()	()	MCI Center	13-13
27	July 31	@ New York	L 66-80	()	()	()	Madison Square Garden	13-14

September

Game	Date	Opponent	Score	High points	High rebounds	High assists	Location	Record
Summer Olympic break
28	September 1	@ Charlotte	L 55-62	()	()	()	Charlotte Coliseum	13-15
29	September 3	New York	W 61-43	()	()	()	Mohegan Sun Arena	14-15
30	September 10	@ New York	W 77-66	()	()	()	Madison Square Garden	15-15
31	September 12	Seattle	W 71-64	()	()	()	Mohegan Sun Arena	16-15
32	September 15	@ Charlotte	W 81-67	()	()	()	Charlotte Coliseum	17-15
33	September 17	New York	L 66-69	()	()	()	Mohegan Sun Arena	17-16
34	September 19	Indiana	W 80-60	()	()	()	Mohegan Sun Arena	18-16

=== Playoffs ===
In the first round of the Eastern Conference Playoffs, the Sun had to face the Washington Mystics. Since the Sun had the better record, the series would be played with game 1 at Washington, game 2 at Connecticut, and game 3 (if needed) at Connecticut. The Sun lost the first game, but won the next two to advance to the next round. In the second round of the Eastern Conference Playoffs, the Sun had to face the New York Liberty. The Sun and the Liberty had identical records and each team had won two of the four meetings against each other in the regular season. The Sun attained home-court advantage however, because they beat the Liberty by more than the Liberty beat them. The series would be played with game 1 at New York and games 2 and 3 (if needed) at Connecticut. The Sun swept the Liberty and game 3 was not needed. The Sun advanced to the WNBA Finals. The team would be facing off against the Seattle Storm. The Storm had the better record so the series would be played with game 1 at Connecticut, and games 2 and 3 (if needed) at Seattle. This was the last year the league played the finals in a best-of-three setup. The Storm beat the Sun 2 games to 1 to win the WNBA Finals.

2004 Game Log: Postseason
Eastern Conference Semifinals

Game	Date	Opponent	Score	High points	High rebounds	High assists	Location/Attendance	Series
1	September 25	@ Washington	L 59-67	Whalen (16)	McWilliams-Franklin (9)	Douglas (4)	MCI Center; 13,263	0-1
2	September 27	Washington	W 80-70	Whalen (21)	Sales (7)	Whalen (6)	Mohegan Sun Arena; 5,760	1-1
3	September 29	Washington	W 76-56	Sales (18)	McWilliams-Franklin (11)	Douglas, Whalen (6)	Mohegan Sun Arena; 5,514	2-1

Eastern Conference Finals

Game	Date	Opponent	Score	High points	High rebounds	High assists	Location/Attendance	Series
1	October 1	@ New York	W 61-51	Sales (15)	McWilliams-Franklin, Palmer-Daniel (10)	Whalen (5)	Madison Square Garden; 12,146	1-0
2	October 3	New York	W 60-57	McWilliams-Franklin (18)	McWilliams-Franklin (9)	Douglas (4)	Mohegan Sun Arena; 6,734	2-0

WNBA Finals

Game	Date	Opponent	Score	High points	High rebounds	High assists	Location/Attendance	Series
1	October 8	Seattle	W 68-64	Douglas (18)	Sales (9)	Whalen (9)	Mohegan Sun Arena; 9,518 (sellout)	1-0
2	October 10	@ Seattle	L 65-67	Sales (32)	McWilliams-Franklin (7)	Whalen (7)	KeyArena; 17,072 (sellout)	1-1
3	October 12	@ Seattle	L 60-74	Sales (18)	Douglas (6)	Douglas, Whalen, McWilliams-Franklin (2)	KeyArena; 17,072 (sellout)	1-2

== Depth ==
Pos.	Starting 5	Bench 1	Bench 2	Inactive
C	Taj McWilliams-Franklin	Le'Coe Willingham		Brooke Wyckoff
PF	Wendy Palmer-Daniel	Asjha Jones	Le'Coe Willingham
SF	Nykesha Sales	Jessica Brungo	Candace Futrell
SG	Katie Douglas	Jennifer Derevjanik
PG	Lindsay Whalen	Debbie Black

== Player stats ==
- http://www.wnba.com/sun/stats/2004/

== Awards and honors ==
- Taj McWilliams-Franklin, Nykesha Sales, and Lindsay Whalen were named to the WNBA All-Star team.
- Nykesha Sales was named to the All-WNBA Second Team.
- Wendy Palmer-Daniel was named the Most Improved Player.
- Nykesha Sales was given the Off Season Community Assist Award.
- Nykesha Sales was named the WNBA Player of the Week for the week of June 27, 2004.
