= 2004 WNBA season =

- League: Women's National Basketball Association
- Sport: Basketball
- Duration: May 20 - October 12, 2004
- Games: 34
- Teams: 13
- Total attendance: 1,903,427
- Average attendance: 8,613
- TV partner(s): ABC, ESPN, Oxygen, NBATV

Draft
- Top draft pick: (United States) Diana Taurasi
- Picked by: Phoenix Mercury

Regular season
- Top seed: Los Angeles Sparks
- Season MVP: (United States) Lisa Leslie (Los Angeles)
- Top scorer: (Australia) Lauren Jackson (Seattle)

Playoffs
- Finals champions: Seattle Storm
- Runners-up: Connecticut Sun
- Finals MVP: (United States) Betty Lennox (Seattle)

WNBA seasons
- ← 2003 2005 →

The 2004 WNBA season was the Women's National Basketball Association's eighth season. The league had one fewer team than in 2003 as the Cleveland Rockers folded after the 2003 season. The season ended with the Seattle Storm winning their first WNBA Championship, as their head coach Anne Donovan became the first female coach to win a WNBA championship.

== Cleveland Rockers dispersal draft ==
On January 6, 2004, the Cleveland Rockers dispersal draft was held. This draft reassigned players from the Cleveland Rockers who folded after the end of 2003 WNBA season. The remaining thirteen teams in the WNBA each selected one player from the 2003 Rockers roster in the one-round draft. Teams drafted in inverse order of their 2003 regular season finish.

The top four picks were:

Pick	Player	Nationality	New Team	Ref.
1	Penny Taylor	Australia	Phoenix Mercury	
2	Chasity Melvin	United States	Washington Mystics	
3	LaToya Thomas	United States	San Antonio Silver Stars	
4	Ann Wauters	Belgium	New York Liberty	

== Regular season ==
=== Standings ===
Eastern Conference

Eastern Conference	W	L	PCT	GB	Home	Road	Conf.
Connecticut Sun ^{x}	18	16	.529	–	10–7	8–9	14–6
New York Liberty ^{x}	18	16	.529	–	11–6	7–10	10–10
Detroit Shock ^{x}	17	17	.500	1.0	8–9	9–8	11–9
Washington Mystics ^{x}	17	17	.500	1.0	11–6	6–11	9–11
Charlotte Sting ^{o}	16	18	.471	2.0	10–7	6–11	8–12
Indiana Fever ^{o}	15	19	.441	3.0	10–7	5–12	8–12

Western Conference

Western Conference	W	L	PCT	GB	Home	Road	Conf.
Los Angeles Sparks ^{x}	25	9	.735	–	15–2	10–7	16–6
Seattle Storm ^{x}	20	14	.588	5.0	13–4	7–10	13–9
Minnesota Lynx ^{x}	18	16	.529	7.0	11–6	7–10	12–10
Sacramento Monarchs ^{x}	18	16	.529	7.0	10–7	8–9	12–10
Phoenix Mercury ^{o}	17	17	.500	8.0	10–7	7–10	11–11
Houston Comets ^{o}	13	21	.382	12.0	9–8	4–13	7–15
San Antonio Silver Stars ^{o}	9	25	.265	16.0	6–11	3–14	6–16

== Playoffs ==
**Conference semifinals** Best-of-3
E1	**Connecticut**	2
E4	Washington	1
**Eastern Conference**
E2	**New York**	2
E3	Detroit	1
W1	Los Angeles	1
W4	**Sacramento**	2
**Western Conference**
W2	**Seattle**	2
W3	Minnesota	0

**Conference finals** Best-of-3
E1	**Connecticut**	2
E2	New York	0
W4	Sacramento	1
W2	**Seattle**	2

**WNBA Finals**; Best-of-3
E1	Connecticut	1
W2	**Seattle**	2

- **Bold** – Series winner
- Italic – Team with home-court advantage

== Awards ==
=== Individual ===
Award		Winner	Team
**Most Valuable Player (MVP)**		Lisa Leslie	Los Angeles Sparks
**Finals MVP**		Betty Lennox	Seattle Storm
**Defensive Player of the Year**		Lisa Leslie	Los Angeles Sparks
**Most Improved Player** (co-winners)		Kelly Miller	Indiana Fever
**Most Improved Player** (co-winners)		Wendy Palmer	Connecticut Sun
**Peak Performers**	**Scoring**	Lauren Jackson	Seattle Storm
**Peak Performers**	**Rebounding**	Lisa Leslie	Los Angeles Sparks
**Rookie of the Year**		Diana Taurasi	Phoenix Mercury
**Kim Perrot Sportsmanship Award**		Teresa Edwards	Minnesota Lynx
**Coach of the Year**		Suzie McConnell Serio	Minnesota Lynx

=== Team ===
Award		Player	Team
All-WNBA	First Team	Lauren Jackson	Seattle Storm
All-WNBA	First Team	Tina Thompson	Houston Comets
All-WNBA	First Team	Lisa Leslie	Los Angeles Sparks
All-WNBA	First Team	Diana Taurasi	Phoenix Mercury
All-WNBA	First Team	Sue Bird	Seattle Storm
All-WNBA	Second Team	Tamika Catchings	Indiana Fever
All-WNBA	Second Team	Swin Cash	Detroit Shock
All-WNBA	Second Team	Yolanda Griffith	Sacramento Monarchs
All-WNBA	Second Team	Nikki Teasley	Los Angeles Sparks
All-WNBA	Second Team	Nykesha Sales	Connecticut Sun

=== Players of the Week ===
Week ending	Player	Team
May 30	Tina Thompson	Houston Comets
June 6	Tamika Catchings	Indiana Fever
June 13	Swin Cash	Detroit Shock
June 20	Tamika Catchings (2)	Indiana Fever
June 27	Nykesha Sales	Connecticut Sun
July 4	Anna DeForge	Phoenix Mercury
July 11	Swin Cash (2)	Detroit Shock
July 18	Lauren Jackson	Seattle Storm
July 25	Lauren Jackson (2)	Seattle Storm
August 1	Tina Thompson (2)	Houston Comets
September 7	Lisa Leslie	Los Angeles Sparks
September 13	Alana Beard	Washington Mystics
September 20	Adrienne Goodson	San Antonio Silver Stars

== Coaches ==
=== Eastern Conference ===
- Charlotte Sting: Trudi Lacey and Tyrone Bogues
- Connecticut Sun: Mike Thibault
- Detroit Shock: Bill Laimbeer
- Indiana Fever: Brian Winters
- New York Liberty: Richie Adubato and Pat Coyle
- Washington Mystics: Michael Adams

=== Western Conference ===
- Houston Comets: Van Chancellor
- Los Angeles Sparks: Michael Cooper, Karleen Thompson and Ryan Weisenberg
- Minnesota Lynx: Suzie McConnell Serio
- Phoenix Mercury: Carrie Graf
- Sacramento Monarchs: John Whisenant
- San Antonio Silver Stars: Dee Brown and Shell Dailey
- Seattle Storm: Anne Donovan
