= 2004 Sacramento Monarchs season =

- Head coach: John Whisenant
- Arena: ARCO Arena

Results
- Record: 18–16 (.529)
- Place: 4th (Western)
- Playoff finish: Lost Conference Finals (2-1) to Seattle Storm

The 2004 WNBA season was the 8th for the Sacramento Monarchs. The Monarchs went to the playoffs, where they upset the Los Angeles Sparks in three games, but fell in the conference finals to eventual champion Seattle Storm.

== Offseason ==
=== Dispersal Draft ===
Based on the Monarchs' 2003 record, they would pick 10th in the Cleveland Rockers dispersal draft. The Monarchs picked Jennifer Butler.

=== WNBA draft ===
Round	Pick	Player	Nationality	School/Club team
1	10	Rebekkah Brunson (F)	United States	Georgetown
3	36	Nuria Martinez (F)	Spain	Spain

== Regular season ==
=== Season standings ===
Western Conference	W	L	PCT	GB	Home	Road	Conf.
Los Angeles Sparks ^{x}	25	9	.735	–	15–2	10–7	16–6
Seattle Storm ^{x}	20	14	.588	5.0	13–4	7–10	13–9
Minnesota Lynx ^{x}	18	16	.529	7.0	11–6	7–10	12–10
Sacramento Monarchs ^{x}	18	16	.529	7.0	10–7	8–9	12–10
Phoenix Mercury ^{o}	17	17	.500	8.0	10–7	7–10	11–11
Houston Comets ^{o}	13	21	.382	12.0	9–8	4–13	7–15
San Antonio Silver Stars ^{o}	9	25	.265	16.0	6–11	3–14	6–16

=== Season schedule ===
Date	Opponent	Score	Result	Record
May 20	@ Phoenix	72-66	Win	1-0
May 22	Minnesota	61-69	Loss	1-1
May 28	@ San Antonio	63-72	Loss	1-2
May 30	@ Houston	57-63	Loss	1-3
June 3	Los Angeles	68-51	Win	2-3
June 5	Seattle	63-65	Loss	2-4
June 12	Connecticut	76-83	Loss	2-5
June 16	@ Indiana	50-63	Loss	2-6
June 17	@ Minnesota	60-50	Win	3-6
June 19	Detroit	74-84	Loss	3-7
June 25	Houston	61-55	Win	4-7
June 27	Phoenix	63-57	Win	5-7
July 1	New York	73-47	Win	6-7
July 3	@ Seattle	61-75	Loss	6-8
July 6	@ New York	66-73	Loss	6-9
July 9	@ Connecticut	85-70	Win	7-9
July 11	@ Minnesota	73-83 (OT)	Loss	7-10
July 12	@ Detroit	67-51	Win	8-10
July 15	Seattle	63-66	Loss	8-11
July 17	@ Los Angeles	79-70	Win	9-11
July 18	Washington	81-71	Win	10-11
July 22	Phoenix	69-71	Loss	10-12
July 25	Indiana	71-62	Win	11-12
July 29	Los Angeles	80-85 (OT)	Loss	11-13
July 31	Charlotte	62-61	Win	12-13
September 1	@ Seattle	73-65	Win	13-13
September 2	San Antonio	66-64	Win	14-13
September 4	@ San Antonio	80-70	Win	15-13
September 7	@ Washington	63-67 (OT)	Loss	15-14
September 9	@ Charlotte	69-74	Loss	15-15
September 12	@ Los Angeles	52-65	Loss	15-16
September 16	@ Houston	71-62	Win	16-16
September 18	Houston	68-48	Win	17-16
September 19	Minnesota	72-63	Win	18-16

== Playoffs ==
Game	Date	Opponent	Score	Result	Record
Western Conference Semifinals
1	September 24	Los Angeles	72-52	Win	1-0
2	September 26	@ Los Angeles	57-71	Loss	1-1
3	September 28	@ Los Angeles	73-58	Win	2-1
Western Conference Finals
1	October 1	Seattle	74-72 (OT)	Win	3-1
2	October 3	@ Seattle	54-66	Loss	3-2
3	October 5	@ Seattle	62-82	Loss	3-3

== Player stats ==
Player	GP	REB	AST	STL	BLK	PTS
Yolanda Griffith	34	246	42	75	41	494
Tangela Smith	34	138	50	38	25	380
Kara Lawson	34	77	68	21	8	294
DeMya Walker	34	143	86	26	13	284
Ticha Penicheiro	33	102	163	64	2	199
Ruthie Bolton	34	49	31	23	0	160
Rebekkah Brunson	34	122	19	23	13	151
Hamchetou Maiga-Ba	34	71	25	29	6	140
Chantelle Anderson	30	34	5	3	6	77
Edna Campbell	22	19	16	5	2	74
Lady Grooms	28	18	11	7	2	49
Giuliana Mendiola	6	5	3	0	0	10
