= 2007 WNBA Finals =

Sports tournament

Team	Coach	Wins
Phoenix Mercury	Paul Westhead	3
Detroit Shock	Bill Laimbeer	2
- Dates: September 5 - 16
- MVP: Cappie Pondexter (Phoenix Mercury)
- Hall of Famers: Shock: Swin Cash (2022); Katie Smith (2018) Mercury: Cappie Pondexter (2025)
- Eastern finals: Detroit defeated Indiana, 2–1
- Western finals: Phoenix defeated San Antonio, 2–0

The 2007 WNBA Finals was the championship series of the 2007 WNBA season, and the conclusion of the season's playoffs. The Phoenix Mercury, top-seeded champions of the Western Conference, defeated the Detroit Shock, top-seeded champions of the Eastern Conference, three games to two in a best-of-five series. This was Phoenix's first ever professional basketball title.

2007 marked the first time in WNBA history that the series was won on the opponent's home floor. The Mercury beat the Shock in Detroit. The Shock made their third appearance in the Finals in five years. The Mercury appeared in the Finals for the second time since in franchise history.

Going into the series, the Shock had won two championships, tied with the Los Angeles Sparks for second most in WNBA history. The now defunct Houston Comets hold the record with four championships won.

The Shock's 24–10 record gave them home court advantage over Phoenix (23–11). It did not matter, however, as the Mercury won game five on the Shock's home floor and became champions of the WNBA.

== Road to the finals ==
Phoenix Mercury		Detroit Shock
23–11 (.676); 1st West, 2nd overall	Regular season	24–10 (.706); 1st East, 1st overall
Defeated the (4) Seattle Storm, 2–0	Conference Semifinals	Defeated the (4) New York Liberty, 2–1
Defeated the (2) San Antonio Silver Stars, 2–0	Conference Finals	Defeated the (2) Indiana Fever, 2–1

=== Regular season series ===
The Detroit Shock won both games in the regular season series:

June 22

Recap

Detroit Shock 87, Phoenix Mercury 84

US Airways Center, Phoenix

July 8

Recap

Phoenix Mercury 82, Detroit Shock 111

Palace of Auburn Hills, Auburn Hills

== Game summaries ==
All times listed below are Eastern Daylight Time.

=== Game 1 ===
ESPN2

September 5
7:00pm

Recap

Phoenix Mercury 100, Detroit Shock 108
Scoring by quarter: 21–18, 14–23, 32–28, 33–39
Pts: Taylor 32; Rebs: Taylor 9 Asts: Taylor 7 Stls: Taurasi 4	Pts: Pierson 26; Rebs: Braxton 12; Asts: Johnson, K. Smith 4 Reb: Pierson 10
Detroit leads series, 1–0

Palace of Auburn Hills, Auburn Hills
Attendance: 10,513
Referees:
  1. 22 Corteau
  2. 38 Simpson
  3. 55 Brewton

The Detroit Shock shook off the absence of their interior star Cheryl Ford and held off the run-and-gun Phoenix Mercury in a wild 108–100 victory in Game 1 of the WNBA finals. Detroit outrebounded Phoenix 48-30 and scored often on putbacks and other high-percentage shots. The Shock's bench outscored Phoenix's 50–12.

Penny Taylor scored 32 points and Cappie Pondexter had 27 to lead the Mercury, who struggled when All-Star Diana Taurasi missed significant stretches of the game with foul trouble.

Taurasi, who averaged 20 points in the Mercury's first four playoff games and 25 during the regular season, was held scoreless in the first half. She scored a quick nine points in the third before being whistled for a loose ball foul with 5:37 to go in the quarter. The contact on Detroit's Katie Smith resulted in Taurasi's fifth foul and she sat on the bench for the remainder of the quarter. Taurasi fouled out with two minutes remaining in the game. She finished with 10 points in 22 minutes.

=== Game 2 ===
ESPN2

September 8
7:00 pm

Recap

Phoenix Mercury 98, Detroit Shock 70
Scoring by quarter: 25–17, 23–15, 31–19, 19–19
Pts: Taurasi 30; Rebs: T. Smith 10; Asts: K. Miller, Pondexter, Taylor 5; 3P-FG: Taurasi 7-14	Pts: Nolan 12; Rebs: Braxton 9 Asts: Johnson, Pierson 3; 3P-FG: Nolan 0-7
Series tied, 1–1

Palace of Auburn Hills, Auburn Hills
Attendance: 16,752
Referees:
  1. 18 Walker
  2. 30 Mattingly
  3. 39 Price

Diana Taurasi bounced back from her woeful Game 1 with 30 points to help the Mercury even the five-game series. During Game 2, she stayed out of foul trouble and scored from all over the court, including seven 3-pointers. Taurasi's long 3 made it 76–44 with less than 3 minutes to play in the third quarter and capped a 15–2 Mercury run. She also had eight rebounds and three assists.

Taurasi's inspired play helped offset the return of forward Cheryl Ford to Detroit's lineup. The four-time All-Star, who missed the first game with a left knee injury, had five points and seven rebounds, but played less than half the game.

Phoenix outscored Detroit in the first three quarters and played most of the fourth without its starters. The Mercury led by as many as 34 and were ahead for the final 37 minutes of the game.

=== Game 3 ===
ESPN2

September 11
7:00 pm

Recap

Detroit Shock 88, Phoenix Mercury 83
Scoring by quarter: 30–23, 20–22, 20–19, 18–19
Pts: K. Smith 22; Rebs: Ford 13; Asts: Nolan 6 Pts: Nolan 20	Pts: Taurasi 22; Rebs: Taylor 14; Asts: K. Miller 5 Rebs: T. Smith 12
Detroit leads series, 2-1

US Airways Center, Phoenix
Attendance: 12,024
Referees:
  1. 8 Humphrey
  2. 10 Trammell
  3. 11 Napier

Katie Smith scored 22 points, one shy of her career playoff high, to help the defending champions beat the cold-shooting Mercury 88–83 and take a 2–1 lead in the WNBA finals.

The 33-year-old Detroit forward, in her 12th pro season, made 4-of-8 3-pointers, 3-for-4 in an 11-point third quarter. Phoenix, meanwhile, shot 35 percent, including a miserable 5-for-31 on 3s, in front of a loud home crowd of 12,024.

Deanna Nolan, who scored 20, sank a crucial 3-pointer with 1:53 to go, then sealed the victory with four consecutive free throws in the final 8.3 seconds. Diana Taurasi scored 22 for the Mercury. Tangela Smith scored 17 but made only 6 of 17 shots for Phoenix. She was 0-for-6 on 3s. Penny Taylor was in foul trouble most of the night but still played 33 minutes and had 16 points and 14 rebounds for the Mercury.

=== Game 4 ===
ESPN2

September 13
7:00 pm

Recap

Detroit Shock 76, Phoenix Mercury 77
Scoring by quarter: 12–17, 23–16, 25–24, 16–20
Pts: Pierson 23; Rebs: Ford 14; Asts: Nolan 5; 3P-FG: K. Smith 4-7	Pts: Pondexter 26; Rebs: Taylor 9 Asts: Pondexter 5 FG: Taurasi 8-13
Series tied, 2-2

US Airways Center, Phoenix
Attendance: 12,813
Referees:
  1. 18 Walker
  2. 22 Corteau
  3. 38 Simpson

With the poor-shooting Phoenix Mercury on the verge of elimination, coach Paul Westhead decided to run the offense through Cappie Pondexter. Pondexter scored a game-high 26 points, including a driving bank shot with 21 seconds to play, and the Phoenix Mercury defeated the Detroit Shock 77–76 to force a deciding fifth game in the WNBA finals.

The Mercury would try in Game Five to become the first team in WNBA history to win a title on the road. Detroit, which won championships in 2003 and 2006, goes home to the Palace of Auburn Hills, where it is 5–1 this postseason. The only loss was a 28-point rout by the Mercury in Game 2.

Phoenix shot 34.7 percent from the floor in an 88–83 loss in Game 3 - matching the worst shooting percentage in Westhead's two seasons as head coach. The Mercury came out just as cold this time, hitting two of their first 11 shots and finishing the first period 5-for-18 (27.8 percent). But Detroit was even more out of sync, and the Mercury went on a 14–4 run late in the first quarter and early in the second to take a 22–14 lead. The Shock found their rhythm in the second quarter, hitting 9-of-19 shots to take a 35–33 halftime lead. But they had missed an opportunity to bury the Mercury.

=== Game 5 ===
ESPN2

September 16
7:00 pm

Recap

Phoenix Mercury 108, Detroit Shock 92
Scoring by quarter: 30–17, 25–26, 24–21, 29–28
Pts: Taylor 30; Rebs: Taurasi 7 Asts: Pondexter 10; Pts: Pondexter 26	Pts: Nolan 27; Rebs: K. Smith 6 Asts: Johnson 8; 3P-FG: K. Smith 6-9
Phoenix wins WNBA Finals, 3-2

Palace of Auburn Hills, Auburn Hills
Attendance: 22,076
Referees:
  1. 10 Trammell
  2. 11 Napier
  3. 39 Price

A fast start helped Phoenix become the first team in the WNBA's 11-year history to claim the title on the road. Cappie Pondexter, in her second year in the league, scored 26 points and was chosen as the series MVP. Penny Taylor scored 30 points and Diana Taurasi had 17 for the Mercury.

The Shock lost the last two games of the series, ending their bid to win back-to-back titles. Detroit also won the championship in 2003.

Phoenix took some steam out of the home crowd, announced at more than 22,000, by surging to a 20–9 lead midway through the first quarter. Taurasi had eight points, including two 3-pointers, in that stretch. The large deficit quickly took Detroit out of its game. The Mercury's smallest lead in the second half was nine points. Katie Smith had 18 points for Detroit, which committed 17 turnovers compared to only nine for the Mercury.

This was the Mercury's first WNBA championship. They previously appeared in the WNBA Finals in 1998.

== Awards ==
- 2007 WNBA champion: Phoenix Mercury
- Finals MVP: Cappie Pondexter

== Rosters ==
2007 Detroit Shock Finals roster
Players
Coaches

Pos.	No.	Nat.	Name	Height	Weight	From
C	45	(United States)	Braxton, Kara	6' 6" (1.98m)	210 lb (95kg)	Georgia
F	2	(United States)	Cash, Swin	6' 1" (1.85m)	162 lb (73kg)	Connecticut
C	44	(United States)	Feenstra, Katie	6' 8" (2.03m)	240 lb (109kg)	Liberty University
PF	35	(United States)	Ford, Cheryl	6' 3" (1.91m)	198 lb (90kg)	Louisiana Tech
G	41	(United States)	Johnson, Shannon	5' 7" (1.7m)	152 lb (69kg)	South Carolina
G	12	(United States)	Latta, Ivory	5' 6" (1.68m)	143 lb (65kg)	North Carolina
C	8	(United States)	Mills, Tausha	6' 3" (1.91m)	232 lb (105kg)	Alabama
SG	14	(United States)	Nolan, Deanna	5' 11" (1.8m)	144 lb (65kg)	Georgia
SF	23	(United States)	Pierson, Plenette	6' 2" (1.88m)	181 lb (82kg)	Texas Tech
PG	5	(United States)	Powell, Elaine	5' 8" (1.73m)	150 lb (68kg)	LSU
G/F	30	(United States)	Smith, Katie	5' 11" (1.8m)	174 lb (79kg)	Ohio State
F	3	(United States)	Smith, Tyresa	6' 0" (1.83m)		Delaware
F	1	(United States)	Walker, Ayana	6' 3" (1.91m)	143 lb (65kg)	Louisiana Tech

Head coach
(United States) Bill Laimbeer (Notre Dame)
Assistant coaches
(United States) Rick Mahorn (Hampton)
(United States) Cheryl Reeve (La Salle)
Athletic trainer
(United States) Laura Ramus (Wayne State (MI))
Strength and conditioning coach
(United States) Laura Ramus (Wayne State (MI))

Legend

- (C) Team captain
- (DP) Unsigned draft pick
- (FA) Free agent
- (S) Suspended
- Injured

2007 Phoenix Mercury Finals roster
Players
Coaches

Pos.	No.	Nat.	Name	Height	Weight	From
PG	24	(United States)	Derevjanik, Jennifer	5' 10" (1.78m)	140 lb (64kg)	George Mason
G	21	(United States)	Lacy, Jennifer	6' 3" (1.91m)	175 lb (79kg)	Pepperdine
SG	33	(United States)	Mazzante, Kelly	6' 0" (1.83m)	155 lb (70kg)	Penn State
PG	2	(United States)	Miller, Kelly	5' 10" (1.78m)	140 lb (64kg)	Georgia
C	5	(United States)	Miller, Teana	6' 3" (1.91m)	220 lb (100kg)	Tulane
SG	23	(United States)	Pondexter, Cappie	5' 9" (1.75m)	160 lb (73kg)	Rutgers
C	11	(United States)	Schumacher, Kelly	6' 5" (1.96m)	183 lb (83kg)	Connecticut
C	0	(United States)	Scott, Olympia	6' 2" (1.88m)	175 lb (79kg)	Stanford
C	50	(United States)	Smith, Tangela	6' 4" (1.93m)	160 lb (73kg)	Iowa
G	12	(Australia)	Snell, Belinda	5' 9" (1.75m)	170 lb (77kg)	Australia
G/F	3	(United States)	Taurasi, Diana	6' 0" (1.83m)	172 lb (78kg)	Connecticut
F	13	(Australia)	Taylor, Penny	6' 1" (1.85m)	168 lb (76kg)	Australia

Head coach
(United States) Paul Westhead (Saint Joseph's)
Assistant coaches
(United States) Corey Gaines (Loyola Marymount)
(United States) Julie Hairgrove (Arizona)
(United States) Bridget Pettis (Florida)
Athletic trainer
(United States) Tanara Oiike (California State University)
Strength and conditioning coach
(United States) Tanara Oiike (California State University)

Legend

- (C) Team captain
- (DP) Unsigned draft pick
- (FA) Free agent
- (S) Suspended
- Injured
