= 2007 Phoenix Mercury season =

- WNBA champions
- Head coach: Paul Westhead
- Arena: U.S. Airways Center

Results
- Record: 23–11 (.676)
- Place: 1st (Western)
- Playoff finish: Won WNBA Finals

The 2007 WNBA season was the 11th for the Phoenix Mercury. The Mercury won their first WNBA championship.

== Offseason ==
=== WNBA draft ===
The following are the Mercury's selections in the 2007 WNBA draft.

Round	Pick	Player	Nationality	School/Team/Country
1	1	Lindsey Harding	United States	Duke
2	18	Tyresa Smith	United States	Delaware
3	28 (from Minn.)	Leah Rush	United States	Oklahoma
3	31	Chrissy Givens	United States	Middle Tennessee
3	37 (from Det.)	Emily Westerberg	United States	Arizona State

=== Transactions ===
- February 5: The Mercury re-signed Jennifer Lacy and Jen Derevjanik.
- February 21: The Mercury traded Sandora Irvin to the San Antonio Silver Stars for a second-round pick in the 2008 draft.
- March 8: The Mercury re-signed free agent Penny Taylor.
- March 20: The Mercury signed Adriana Moises.
- April 4: The Mercury traded the draft rights to Lindsey Harding to the Minnesota Lynx in exchange for Tangela Smith.
- April 5: The Mercury waived Kamila Vodichkova.
- April 25: The Mercury waived Michelle Campbell and Jocelyn Penn.
- April 26: The Mercury waived Charity Egenti and Yolanda Jones.
- May 1: The Mercury waived Natalie Nakase.
- May 10: The Mercury waived Chloe Kerr and Carrie Moore.
- May 14: The Mercury waived Chrissy Givens.
- May 17: The Mercury waived Leah Rush, Tyresa Smith and Mandisa Stevenson.
- May 18: The Mercury waived Kwe Ryong Kim and Crystal Smith.
- June 21: The Mercury waived Adriana Moises.
- July 5: The Mercury signed Teana Miller.

Date	Trade	
April 4, 2007	To Phoenix Mercury	To Minnesota Lynx
April 4, 2007	Tangela Smith	draft rights to Lindsey Harding

=== Free agents ===
==== Additions ====
Player	Signed	Former team
Jennifer Lacy	February 5, 2007	re-signed
Jen Derevjanik	February 5, 2007	re-signed
Penny Taylor	March 8, 2007	re-signed
Adriana Moises	March 20, 2007	free agent
Tangela Smith	April 4, 2007	Minnesota Lynx

==== Subtractions ====
Player	Left	New team
Kelly Miller	January 30, 2009	Minnesota Lynx
LaToya Pringle	January 30, 2009	Minnesota Lynx
Barbara Farris	March 20, 2009	Detroit Shock
Yuko Oga	June 2, 2009	free agent
Sha Brooks	June 3, 2009	free agent
Allie Quigley	July 14, 2009	free agent
Jennifer Derevjanik	2009	free agent
Olympia Scott	2009	free agent

== Roster ==
2007 Phoenix Mercury Finals roster
Players
Coaches

Pos.	No.	Nat.	Name	Height	Weight	From
PG	24	(United States)	Derevjanik, Jennifer	5' 10" (1.78m)	140 lb (64kg)	George Mason
G	21	(United States)	Lacy, Jennifer	6' 3" (1.91m)	175 lb (79kg)	Pepperdine
SG	33	(United States)	Mazzante, Kelly	6' 0" (1.83m)	155 lb (70kg)	Penn State
PG	2	(United States)	Miller, Kelly	5' 10" (1.78m)	140 lb (64kg)	Georgia
C	5	(United States)	Miller, Teana	6' 3" (1.91m)	220 lb (100kg)	Tulane
SG	23	(United States)	Pondexter, Cappie	5' 9" (1.75m)	160 lb (73kg)	Rutgers
C	11	(United States)	Schumacher, Kelly	6' 5" (1.96m)	183 lb (83kg)	Connecticut
C	0	(United States)	Scott, Olympia	6' 2" (1.88m)	175 lb (79kg)	Stanford
C	50	(United States)	Smith, Tangela	6' 4" (1.93m)	160 lb (73kg)	Iowa
G	12	(Australia)	Snell, Belinda	5' 9" (1.75m)	170 lb (77kg)	Australia
G/F	3	(United States)	Taurasi, Diana	6' 0" (1.83m)	172 lb (78kg)	Connecticut
F	13	(Australia)	Taylor, Penny	6' 1" (1.85m)	168 lb (76kg)	Australia

Head coach
(United States) Paul Westhead (Saint Joseph's)
Assistant coaches
(United States) Corey Gaines (Loyola Marymount)
(United States) Julie Hairgrove (Arizona)
(United States) Bridget Pettis (Florida)
Athletic trainer
(United States) Tanara Oiike (California State University)
Strength and conditioning coach
(United States) Tanara Oiike (California State University)

Legend

- (C) Team captain
- (DP) Unsigned draft pick
- (FA) Free agent
- (S) Suspended
- Injured

== Season standings ==
Western Conference	W	L	PCT	GB	Home	Road	Conf.
Phoenix Mercury ^{x}	23	11	.676	–	12–5	11–6	17–5
San Antonio Silver Stars ^{x}	20	14	.588	3.0	9–8	11–6	13–9
Sacramento Monarchs ^{x}	19	15	.559	4.0	12–5	7–10	12–10
Seattle Storm ^{x}	17	17	.500	6.0	12–5	5–12	11–11
Houston Comets ^{o}	13	21	.382	10.0	7–10	6–11	10–12
Minnesota Lynx ^{o}	10	24	.294	13.0	7–10	3–14	8–14
Los Angeles Sparks ^{o}	10	24	.294	13.0	5–12	5–12	6–16

== Schedule ==
=== Regular season ===
Date	Opponent	Score	Result	Record
May 19	San Antonio	81-72	Win	1-0
May 23	@ Seattle	87-100	Loss	1-1
May 25	Houston	111-85	Win	2-1
May 29	Sacramento	76-75	Win	3-1
May 31	@ San Antonio	97-85	Win	4-1
June 2	@ Connecticut	67-76	Loss	4-2
June 3	@ New York	82-83	Loss	4-3
June 5	Minnesota	85-90	Loss	4-4
June 7	Chicago	80-66	Win	5-4
June 9	@ Sacramento	74-70	Win	6-4
June 13	@ Washington	69-86	Loss	6-5
June 15	@ Indiana	89-78	Win	7-5
June 20	Washington	101-106	Loss	7-6
June 22	Detroit	84-87	Loss	7-7
June 24	Houston	90-85	Win	8-7
June 30	@ Houston	92-75	Win	9-7
July 3	@ Minnesota	95-79	Win	10-7
July 6	Connecticut	111-109 (2OT)	Win	11-7
July 8	@ Detroit	82-111	Loss	11-8
July 11	San Antonio	77-87	Loss	11-9
July 17	Seattle	89-79	Win	12-9
July 20	Los Angeles	77-87	Loss	12-10
July 22	Minnesota	106-93	Win	13-10
July 25	@ Minnesota	103-79	Win	14-10
July 27	@ Chicago	98-96	Win	15-10
July 29	Indiana	80-75	Win	16-10
July 31	@ Houston	76-74	Win	17-10
August 2	@ San Antonio	84-79	Win	18-10
August 4	@ Seattle	101-111	Loss	18-11
August 7	@ Los Angeles	96-93	Win	19-11
August 9	New York	97-86	Win	20-11
August 11	Los Angeles	100-83	Win	21-11
August 17	@ Sacramento	101-91	Win	22-11
August 19	Sacramento	87-73	Win	23-11
August 24 (first round, game 1)	@ Seattle	101-84	Win	1-0
August 26 (first round, game 2)	Seattle	95-89	Win	2-0
August 30 (West finals, game 1)	@ San Antonio	102-100	Win	3-0
September 1 (West finals, game 2)	San Antonio	98-92	Win	4-0
September 5 (WNBA finals, game 1)	@ Detroit	100-108	Loss	4-1
September 8 (WNBA finals, game 2)	@ Detroit	98-70	Win	5-1
September 11 (WNBA finals, game 3)	Detroit	83-88	Loss	5-2
September 13 (WNBA finals, game 4)	Detroit	77-76	Win	6-2
September 15 (WNBA finals, game 5)	@ Detroit	108-92	Win	7-2

== Regular season statistics ==
Legend
GP	Games played	GS	Games started	MPG	Minutes per game	RPG	Rebounds per game
APG	Assists per game	SPG	Steals per game	BPG	Blocks per game	PPG	Points per game
FG%	Field-goal percentage	3P%	3-point field-goal percentage	FT%	Free-throw percentage	TO	Turnovers per game
PF	Fouls per game		Team leader		League leader

Player	GP	MIN	FG	REB	AST	STL	BLK	PTS
Diana Taurasi	32	1025	206	135	137	45	34	613
Penny Taylor	34	1010	198	214	98	51	22	605
Cappie Pondexter	31	966	193	112	123	29	8	532
Tangela Smith	34	1072	165	220	44	40	56	428
Kelly Miller	34	1040	115	168	156	42	5	321
Kelly Mazzante	34	488	64	56	38	26	2	182
Kelly Schumacher	34	543	57	147	12	17	25	151
Belinda Snell	30	343	37	46	44	20	4	107
Jennifer Derevjanik	23	200	13	23	24	6	1	36
Jennifer Lacy	20	94	12	19	2	3	0	35
Olympia Scott	8	32	1	4	2	3	1	8
Adriana Moises	4	31	2	7	3	3	0	7
Teana Miller	2	5	0	1	0	0	1	0

== Awards and honors ==
- Cappie Pondexter was named the 2007 Finals MVP.
