= 2008 Phoenix Mercury season =

- Head coach: Corey Gaines
- Arena: US Airways Center

Results
- Record: 16–18 (.471)
- Place: 6th (Western)
- Playoff finish: Did not qualify

The 2008 WNBA season was the 12th for the Phoenix Mercury. The Mercury were not able to win their second consecutive WNBA Championship and became the first defending champion to not qualify for the playoffs.

== Offseason ==
On September 27, 2007, head coach Paul Westhead resigned and took a job as an assistant coach under P.J. Carlesimo for the Seattle SuperSonics. Assistant coach Corey Gaines was named the team's new head coach on November 7 of that year.

=== Expansion draft ===
- Jennifer Lacy was selected in the 2008 Expansion Draft for the Atlanta Dream.

=== WNBA draft ===
Round	Pick	Player	Nationality	School
1	13	LaToya Pringle	United States	North Carolina
2	25 (from SA)	Leilani Mitchell	United States	Utah
3	41	Marscilla Packer	United States	Ohio State

== Transactions ==
=== Trades ===
April 22, 2008	To Phoenix Mercury New York's third-round pick in the 2009 WNBA draft	To New York Liberty Leilani Mitchell

=== Free agents ===
Player	Signed	Former team
Le'Coe Willingham	March 10, 2008	Connecticut Sun
Barbara Farris	March 14, 2008	New York Liberty
Olympia Scott	August 7, 2008	Los Angeles Sparks

Player	Left	New team

Player	Re-signed
Kelly Mazzante	February 20, 2008
Tangela Smith	March 11, 2008
Diana Taurasi	March 20, 2008
Jennifer Derejanik	April 3, 2008

== Regular season ==
=== Season standings ===
Western Conference	W	L	PCT	GB	Home	Road	Conf.
San Antonio Silver Stars ^{x}	24	10	.706	–	15–2	9–8	10–10
Seattle Storm ^{x}	22	12	.647	2.0	16–1	6–11	13–7
Los Angeles Sparks ^{x}	20	14	.588	4.0	12–5	8–9	12–8
Sacramento Monarchs ^{x}	18	16	.529	6.0	5–12	13–4	9–11
Houston Comets ^{o}	17	17	.500	7.0	13–4	4–13	10–10
Minnesota Lynx ^{o}	16	18	.471	8.0	10–7	6–11	8–12
Phoenix Mercury ^{o}	16	18	.471	8.0	9–8	7–10	8–12

=== Season schedule ===
Date	Opponent	Score	Leading Scorer	Attendance	Record
May 17	vs. Los Angeles	94-99	Cappie Pondexter (32)	13,749	0-1
May 20	@ San Antonio	76-81	Cappie Pondexter (23)	9,103	0-2
May 22	vs. Seattle	83-87	Diana Taurasi (23)	7,059	0-3
May 31	@ Minnesota	83-94	Cappie Pondexter (31)	6,914	0-4
June 3	vs. Washington	98-93	Diana Taurasi (29)	7,561	1-4
June 6	@ Los Angeles	85-79	Diana Taurasi (29)	13,142	2-4
June 11	@ Seattle	77-83	Diana Taurasi (37)	7,483	2-5
June 14	vs. Detroit	79-89	Cappie Pondexter (28)	7,696	2-6
June 18	vs. Connecticut	102-81	Diana Taurasi (32)	4,478	3-6
June 20	vs. Chicago	112-105 (OT)	Diana Taurasi (33)	7,311	4-6
June 22	@ New York	72-105	Diana Taurasi (21)	8,688	4-7
June 24	@ Washington	98-90	Diana Taurasi (31)	6,662	5-7
June 26	@ Chicago	89-79	Kelly Miller (17)	3,103	6-7
June 29	@ Connecticut	87-80	Diana Taurasi (25)	9,518	7-7
July 1	@ Atlanta	97-79	Diana Taurasi (28)	9,795	8-7
July 5	vs. New York	83-93	Diana Taurasi (25)	6,481	8-8
July 6	@ Los Angeles	80-91	Kelly Miller (14); Cappie Pondexter (14)	10,004	8-9
July 8	vs. Houston	99-94	Diana Taurasi (30)	15,499	9-9
July 10	@ Seattle	78-89	Cappie Pondexter (20)	10,454	9-10
July 12	@ Sacramento	97-105	Cappie Pondexter (33)	7,044	9-11
July 15	vs. San Antonio	87-97	Diana Taurasi (23); Cappie Pondexter (23)	6,451	9-12
July 17	vs. Los Angeles	99-92	Cappie Pondexter (27)	7,981	10-12
July 19	vs. Atlanta	110-84	Diana Taurasi (21)	7,913	11-12
July 22	@ Houston	92-94	Diana Taurasi (31)	6,134	11-13
July 24	@ Sacramento	74-83	Cappie Pondexter (23)	11,946	11-14
July 25	vs. Seattle	94-80	Diana Taurasi (31)	8,323	12-14
July 27	vs. Indiana	84-88	Diana Taurassi (25)	7,924	12-15
August 28	vs. San Antonio	55-77	Diana Taurasi (13)	7,931	12-16
September 3	vs. Minnesota	103-96	Diana Taurasi (32)	7,722	13-16
September 5	vs. Sacramento	81-69	Diana Taurasi (26)	10,527	14-16
September 7	vs. Houston	99-74	Diana Taurasi (33)	10,261	15-16
September 9	@ Detroit	78-89	Cappie Pondexter (23)	7,495	15-17
September 12	@ Minnesota	96-87	Diana Taurasi (31)	8,343	16-17
September 14	@ Indiana	89-103	Cappie Pondexter (23)	8,776	16-18

== Player stats ==
Legend
GP	Games played	GS	Games started	MPG	Minutes per game
FG%	Field-goal percentage	3P%	3-point field-goal percentage	FT%	Free-throw percentage
RPG	Rebounds per game	APG	Assists per game	SPG	Steals per game
BPG	Blocks per game	PPG	Points per game

=== Regular season ===
Player	GP	GS	MPG	FG%	3P%	FT%	RPG	APG	SPG	BPG	PPG
Diana Taurasi	34	34	31.9	.446	.360	.870	5.1	3.6	1.4	1.4	24.1
Cappie Pondexter	32	32	31.3	.413	.313	.846	3.7	4.2	1.2	0.2	21.2
Tangela Smith	25	25	28.9	.417	.348	.867	7.0	1.1	1.1	1.2	11.1
Le'Coe Willingham	34	27	24.5	.570	.185	.741	5.9	0.9	0.7	0.2	10.1
Kelly Miller	34	34	27.8	.408	.385	.845	4.4	4.0	0.7	0.1	8.3
Kelly Mazzante	34	2	18.9	.332	.331	.833	1.9	1.1	0.7	0.1	5.8
LaToya Pringle	29	7	13.0	.448	.000	.824	3.5	0.3	0.3	1.5	4.4
Barbara Farris	34	8	16.3	.463	.000	.698	3.8	0.2	0.6	0.1	3.5
Olympia Scott	6	0	11.5	.364	.000	.000	3.2	0.5	0.2	1.0	2.7
Yuko Oga	23	0	7.3	.351	.000	.941	0.7	0.6	0.3	0.0	2.4
Allie Quigley	14	0	7.1	.333	.182	.500	0.8	0.3	0.4	0.1	2.1
Willnett Crockett	5	1	8.2	.375	.000	.600	2.2	0.0	0.8	0.2	1.8
Jennifer Derevjanik	17	0	8.5	.263	.125	.750	1.0	1.6	0.1	0.2	0.8

Phoenix Mercury Regular Season Stats

== Roster ==
2008 Phoenix Mercury roster
Players
Coaches

Pos.	No.	Nat.	Name	Height	Weight	From
PG	24	(United States)	Derevjanik, Jennifer	5' 10" (1.78m)	140 lb (64kg)	George Mason
C	54	(United States)	Farris, Barbara	6' 3" (1.91m)	200 lb (91kg)	Tulane
SG	33	(United States)	Mazzante, Kelly	6' 0" (1.83m)	155 lb (70kg)	Penn State
PG	2	(United States)	Miller, Kelly	5' 10" (1.78m)	140 lb (64kg)	Georgia
PG	1	(Japan)	Oga, Yuko	5' 6" (1.68m)	140 lb (64kg)	Japan
SG	23	(United States)	Pondexter, Cappie	5' 9" (1.75m)	160 lb (73kg)	Rutgers
F/C	30	(United States)	Pringle, LaToya	6' 3" (1.91m)	162 lb (73kg)	North Carolina
PG	14	(United States)	Quigley, Allie	5' 10" (1.78m)	140 lb (64kg)	DePaul
C	0	(United States)	Scott, Olympia	6' 2" (1.88m)	175 lb (79kg)	Stanford
F/C	21	(United States)	Smith, Brooke	6' 3" (1.91m)	195 lb (88kg)	Stanford
C	50	(United States)	Smith, Tangela	6' 4" (1.93m)	160 lb (73kg)	Iowa
G/F	3	(United States)	Taurasi, Diana	6' 0" (1.83m)	172 lb (78kg)	Connecticut
PF	43	(United States)	Willingham, Le'Coe	6' 0" (1.83m)	200 lb (91kg)	Auburn

Head coach
(United States) Corey Gaines (Loyola Marymount)
Assistant coaches
(United States) Bridget Pettis (Florida)
(United States) Julie Hairgrove (Arizona)
Athletic trainer
(United States) Tanara Oiike (California State University)
Strength and conditioning coach
(United States) Tanara Oiike (California State University)

Legend

- (C) Team captain
- (DP) Unsigned draft pick
- (FA) Free agent
- (S) Suspended
- Injured

WNBA roster page

== Awards and honors ==
- Diana Taurasi, WNBA Player of the Week (June 2–8, June 16–22, June 23–29, and September 1–7)
- Cappie Pondexter, WNBA Player of the Week (July 14–20)
- Diana Taurasi, WNBA Peak Performers (Points)
- Diana Taurasi, All-WNBA First Team
