= Le'coe Willingham =

American basketball player (born 1981)

Personal information
- Born: February 10, 1981 (age 45) Augusta, Georgia, U.S.
- Listed height: 6 ft 0 in (1.83 m)
- Listed weight: 200 lb (91 kg)

Career information
- High school: Hephzibah (Hephzibah, Georgia)
- College: Auburn (1999–2004)
- WNBA draft: 2004: undrafted
- Playing career: 2004–present
- Position: Assistant coach

Career history

Playing
- 2004–2007: Connecticut Sun
- 2008–2009: Phoenix Mercury
- 2010–2011: Seattle Storm
- 2010–2012: Elitzur Ramla
- 2012: Chicago Sky
- 2013: Atlanta Dream

Coaching
- 2021–2022: Dallas Wings (assistant)
- 2022–2023: Maccabi Bnot Ashdod

Career highlights
- 2× WNBA champion (2009, 2010); EuroCup Women (2011); Israeli championship (2011); Israeli State Cup (2011); 2× First-team All-SEC (2000, 2004); SEC All-Freshman Team (2000)
- Stats at WNBA.com
- Stats at Basketball Reference

Le'coe Willingham (born February 10, 1981) is an American professional basketball player. Attending Hephzibah High School, she won the 1998 AAAA Georgia State Women's state high jump title. She last played the forward position for the Atlanta Dream in the WNBA.

== College career ==
Among Auburn's top ten career leaders in starts, points, field goals made, field goal percentage, free throws made, free throws attempted, rebounds. Willingham is Auburn's seventh all-time scorer and sixth all-time rebounder.

== Career statistics ==
=== WNBA ===
Legend
GP	Games played	GS	Games started	MPG	Minutes per game	RPG	Rebounds per game
APG	Assists per game	SPG	Steals per game	BPG	Blocks per game	PPG	Points per game
TO	Turnovers per game	FG%	Field-goal percentage	3P%	3-point field-goal percentage	FT%	Free-throw percentage
**Bold**	Career best	°	League leader

==== Regular season ====
Year	Team	GP	GS	MPG	FG%	3P%	FT%	RPG	APG	SPG	BPG	TO	PPG
2004	Connecticut	23	0	7.6	**63.2**	0.0	76.9	1.9	0.3	0.3	0.1	**0.5**	3.0
2005	Connecticut	18	0	5.1	41.2	0.0	50.0	0.9	0.2	0.1	0.0	0.8	1.3
2006	Connecticut	29	0	7.2	47.2	**60.0**	53.8	1.9	0.6	0.2	0.0	**0.5**	2.2
2007	Connecticut	28	5	11.4	38.5	0.0	72.0	2.8	0.4	0.3	0.2	0.7	2.1
2008	Phoenix	**34**	27	**24.5**	57.0	18.5	74.1	**5.9**	0.9	0.6	0.2	1.4	**10.1**
2009	Phoenix	**34**	**34**	21.0	53.3	12.5	**84.8**	4.2	1.0	0.6	**0.3**	1.4	10.0
2010	Seattle	33	2	15.6	53.8	45.2	66.7	4.1	0.7	0.5	0.2	0.9	5.5
2011	Seattle	**34**	8	19.1	47.3	27.5	64.2	4.2	**1.1**	0.5	0.2	1.3	6.4
2012	Chicago	33	1	18.5	31.3	27.4	60.9	2.9	0.9	0.5	0.1	1.7	3.5
2013	Atlanta	**34**	28	22.2	42.4	30.4	71.4	4.2	0.8	**0.8**	**0.3**	1.2	4.1
Career	10 years, 5 teams	300	105	16.2	49.0	29.6	71.3	3.5	0.7	0.5	0.2	1.1	5.2

==== Playoffs ====
Year	Team	GP	GS	MPG	FG%	3P%	FT%	RPG	APG	SPG	BPG	TO	PPG
2004	Connecticut	8	0	7.5	38.9	0.0	75.0	2.4	0.1	0.0	0.1	0.4	2.1
2005	Connecticut	3	0	3.3	0.0	0.0	**100.0**	0.3	0.0	0.0	0.3	**0.3**	0.7
2006	Connecticut	3	0	3.3	40.0	**100.0**	0.0	1.3	0.0	0.0	0.3	**0.3**	1.7
2007	Connecticut	3	0	13.7	**75.0**	**100.0**	**100.0**	3.3	0.7	0.0	0.3	1.0	5.3
2009	Phoenix	**11**	**11**	**23.1**	53.8	0.0	83.3	**4.4**	0.9	0.4	**0.5**	1.3	**8.2**
2010	Seattle	7	0	13.3	50.0	28.6	71.4	2.9	**1.0**	0.0	0.0	0.6	4.7
2011	Seattle	3	0	13.0	27.3	0.0	0.0	3.3	0.7	0.3	0.0	0.7	2.0
2013	Atlanta	4	2	18.0	10.0	0.0	0.0	1.8	**1.0**	**0.8**	0.3	0.8	0.5
Career	8 years, 4 teams	42	13	13.8	46.2	23.5	78.6	2.8	0.6	0.2	0.2	0.7	4.1

=== College ===
Legend
GP	Games played	GS	Games started	MPG	Minutes per game
FG%	Field goal percentage	3P%	3-point field goal percentage	FT%	Free throw percentage
RPG	Rebounds per game	APG	Assists per game	SPG	Steals per game
BPG	Blocks per game	PPG	Points per game	**Bold**	Career high

Year	Team	GP	Points	FG%	3P%	FT%	RPG	APG	SPG	BPG	PPG
1999–00	Auburn	27	305	49.6	0	73.1	7.6	1.1	1.2	0.3	11.3
2001–02	Auburn	29	**348**	49.3	50	62.7	8.1	1.1	1.1	0.2	12
2002–03	Auburn	**33**	316	48.3	31.7	71	6.2	1.3	1.2	0.2	9.6
2003–04	Auburn	31	506	**60.8**	**33.3**	**76.5**	**9.1**	**1.6**	**1.4**	**0.4**	**16.3**
Career	Auburn	120	1475	52.6	31.3	71	7.7	1.3	1.2	0.3	12.3

== WNBA career ==
Willingham began her career with the Connecticut Sun. She was not drafted, but instead signed as a free agent by the Sun. During the 2008 offseason, the Phoenix Mercury signed her as a free agent. In the 2010 offseason, she signed a free agent deal with the Seattle Storm. Willingham helped the Seattle Storm win their second championship in 2010.
