= 2009 WNBA Finals =

Professional basketball championship

Team	Coach	Wins
Phoenix Mercury	Corey Gaines	3
Indiana Fever	Lin Dunn	2
- Dates: September 29 – October 9
- MVP: (United States) Diana Taurasi (Phoenix)
- Hall of Famers: Fever: Tamika Catchings (2020)
- Eastern finals: Indiana defeated Detroit, 2–1
- Western finals: Phoenix defeated Los Angeles, 2–1

The 2009 WNBA Finals was the championship series of the 2009 WNBA season, and the conclusion of the season's playoffs. The Indiana Fever, top-seeded champions of the Eastern Conference, faced the Phoenix Mercury, top-seeded champions of the Western Conference. The Phoenix Mercury defeated the Indiana Fever 3 games to 2 to win their second WNBA Finals title.

The Fever made their first ever appearance in the Finals. The Mercury made their third appearance in the Finals.

The Mercury's 23–11 record gave them home court advantage over Indiana (22–12).

== Road to the finals ==
Phoenix Mercury		Indiana Fever
23–11 (.676); 1st West, 1st overall	Regular season	22–12 (.647); 1st East, 2nd overall
Defeated the (4) San Antonio Silver Stars, 2–1	Conference Semifinals	Defeated the (4) Washington Mystics, 2–0
Defeated the (3) Los Angeles Sparks, 2–1	Conference Finals	Defeated the (3) Detroit Shock, 2–1

=== Regular season series ===
The Fever and the Mercury split the regular season series:

no TV

August 8

Recap

Indiana Fever 90, Phoenix Mercury 83

US Airways Center, Phoenix, AZ

FS Indiana

September 2

Recap

Phoenix Mercury 106, Indiana Fever 90

Conseco Fieldhouse, Indianapolis, IN

== Game summaries ==
All times listed below are Eastern Daylight Time.

=== Game 1 ===
ESPN2HD

September 29
9:00 p.m.

Game 1

Indiana Fever 116, Phoenix Mercury 120 (OT)
Scoring by quarter: 31–31, 22–25, 33–24, 19–25, Overtime: 11–15
Pts: Douglas (30); Rebs: Hoffman (8); Asts: January (7); FG: Hoffman (12-14)	Pts: Pondexter, Taylor (23); Rebs: Taurasi (9); Asts: Taurasi (6); FG: Taylor (7-10)
Phoenix leads series, 1–0

US Airways Center, Phoenix, AZ
Attendance: 11,617
Referees:
- #8 Daryl Humphrey
- #22 June Corteau
- #45 Tom Mauer

Cappie Pondexter missed a game-winning tip-in at the fourth-quarter buzzer then scored seven of her 23 points in overtime Tuesday night to help the Mercury beat the visiting Fever 120–116 in the highest-scoring game in WNBA history.

"Well, if you didn't like women's basketball," Phoenix coach Corey Gaines said, "I think you do now."

Pondexter, frustrated and in foul trouble in the first half, scored the final five points to close out Game 1 of the best-of-five series.

Penny Taylor scored 23 points and newly crowned league MVP Diana Taurasi had 22 for Phoenix.

Katie Douglas tied it with a 3-pointer for Indiana with 7.1 seconds left in regulation, then scored eight in overtime for the Fever to reach a career playoff high 30 points. Ebony Hoffman had a career-high 27 on 12 of 14 shooting as the Fever set a franchise scoring record in just the second 100-point game in the club's history.

The Mercury and Fever each scored more points than any team previously in league history. The old mark was 115, of course by Phoenix, in an overtime victory over Sacramento on June 13.

"It was fun," Taurasi said, "kind of showing a different side of women's basketball - how high a level it is. It's fun to be in the game and I'm sure it was fun to watch."

Indiana's Tamika Catchings had just eight points before fouling out with 2:42 left in overtime but harassed Taurasi into a 5 of 17 shooting night.

Rookie DeWanna Bonner's two free throws put Phoenix ahead 105–102 with 14.2 seconds left in regulation, then after a timeout, the Fever got the ball to the open Douglas, who sank the 3 that tied it.

The lead changed hands six times in overtime. Douglas' 15-footer gave Indiana its final lead at 116–115 with 1:40 left. Pondexter scored on a drive to put the Mercury ahead 117–116 with 1:27 to go, then sank a 16-footer with 20.2 seconds to go to make it 119–116. She finally finished off the Fever by making one of two free throws with 3 seconds to play.

Ratings and viewership for Game 1 of the WNBA Finals on ESPN2 were up 39 percent (.43 rating vs. .31 rating for Game 1 of the '08 WNBA Finals) and 59 percent respectively (555,000 viewers vs. 348,000 viewers), making Game 1 the most viewed WNBA game on cable since Game 4 of the '07 WNBA Finals (Shock vs. Mercury) on ESPN2 (669,000).

=== Game 2 ===
ESPN2HD

October 1
9:00 p.m.

Game 2

Indiana Fever 93, Phoenix Mercury 84
Scoring by quarter: 31–24, 17–21, 29–18, 16–21
Pts: Catchings (19); Rebs: Catchings (9); Asts: Catchings (11); 3PFG: January (3-4)	Pts: Taurasi (20); Rebs: Taurasi (7); Asts: Johnson (5); Blocks: Taurasi (4)
Series tied, 1–1

US Airways Center, Phoenix, AZ
Attendance: 16,758
Referees:
- #4 Sue Blauch
- #39 Michael Price
- #42 Roy Gulbeyan

Tamika Catchings fell one rebound shy of the first triple-double in WNBA finals history and the Indiana Fever beat the Phoenix Mercury 93–84 to square the best-of-five series 1–1.

After scoring just eight points and fouling out in Game 1, Catchings had 19 points, 11 assists (tying a finals record) and nine rebounds to help the Fever steal home-court advantage in the series with the next two games in Indianapolis.

"Series can swing either way really quick," Diana Taurasi said, "and it's swung in their favor pretty quick now."

The WNBA defensive player of the year for the third time, Catchings also harassed the league MVP Taurasi into a 7-for-22 shooting night. Taurasi finished with 20 points, going 2 of 10 on 3-pointers.

There has not been a triple-double in any WNBA game since 2005 and it has happened only once in the playoffs. When Catchings, runner-up to Taurasi in the MVP voting, needed only two rebounds in the final six-plus minutes, it looked as if she would get there. But her ninth didn't come until there was just 28 seconds to play.

The cold-shooting Mercury were without supersub Penny Taylor most of the second half. The Aussie, who scored all 14 of her points in the first half, took an elbow from Indiana rookie Briann January and left with a cut lip with 3:33 to play in the third quarter.

January, a standout at nearby Arizona State, finished with 16 points on 5-of-7 shooting, 3 of 4 on 3-pointers.

The Mercury struggled on offense two nights after a 120–116 overtime victory in Game 1, the highest-scoring contest in WNBA history. Phoenix shot 39.7 percent for the game and was just 5 of 20 in the third quarter, when the Fever built a 17-point lead.

Indiana's biggest lead was 77–60 on Ebony Hoffman's 7-footer with 5.6 seconds left in the third. Temeka Johnson's 3-pointer at the buzzer made it 77–63 entering the fourth.

A late 14–5 run cut the Fever's lead to 85–80 on Taurasi's layup with 1:23 to play. But Tammy Sutton-Brown responded with a basket inside, then January and Katie Douglas put the game away with free throws.

Entering Game 3, ESPN2 was averaging a 0.36 U.S. rating (0.4 cable) and 531,000 viewers for the Fever/Mercury series, up 50% in ratings and 55% in viewers compared to the first two games of 2008's Shock/Silver Stars series (0.24 U.S., 0.3 cable, 331,000 viewers).

=== Game 3 ===
ESPN2HD

October 4
4:00 p.m.

Game 3

Phoenix Mercury 85, Indiana Fever 86
Scoring by quarter: 17–24, 30–20, 20–26, 18–16
Pts: Pondexter (23); Rebs: T. Smith (10); Asts: Pondexter (8); FG: Willingham (7-11)	Pts: Hoffman (18); Rebs: Catchings (12); Asts: Catchings, Douglas (7); Stls: Catchings (4)
Indiana leads series, 2-1

Conseco Fieldhouse, Indianapolis, IN
Attendance: 18,165
Referees:
- #7 Clarke Stevens
- #22 June Corteau
- #55 Eric Brewton

Ebony Hoffman hit the jumper that gave her team a one-point lead with 57 seconds left, then blocked Tangela Smith's shot with a second remaining to help Indiana defeat Phoenix 86–85 in Game 3 of the finals Sunday. The Fever took a 2–1 lead in the series and can clinch the championship with a win at home Wednesday.

Indiana forward Tamika Catchings said Hoffman has been a force since going through a slump at the end of the regular season.

"In the playoffs, she's stepped up her game and done such big things, especially in the Phoenix series, playing unbelievable, out of her mind," Catchings said. "That's awesome to see that, especially with the hard work she's put in over the years."

Hoffman, who led Indiana with 18 points, did it all with a sprained right shoulder. She left the game with 7:21 left and returned with 3:40 to play.

Catchings had 14 points, 12 rebounds and seven assists, Briann January scored 17 points, and Katie Douglas had 15.

Cappie Pondexter led Phoenix with 23 points and Le'coe Willingham added 17. Diana Taurasi, the league's MVP, scored 18 points but shot 6-for-16 from the field.

Hoffman's long shot from the left corner put Indiana ahead in the final minute. Pondexter rushed downcourt and missed a layup, and Catchings rebounded. Then Indiana missed twice in close, but got the offensive rebound. January dribbled the ball out of bounds with 22 seconds left, though, to give Phoenix a final chance.

Pondexter missed a short jumper, and Catchings went for the rebound. She tried to call timeout, but Willingham tied her up and a jump ball was called.

Phoenix got the ball into Smith but her shot was blocked by Hoffman.

The final margin irked Phoenix because the Fever got a free throw when Taurasi was called for a technical foul that she didn't agree with.

Taurasi had just made a tying layup with 5:14 to play, then took the ball and put it on the baseline for Indiana to inbound. As Taurasi turned around, she ran into Douglas, who fell and briefly held her stomach.

Taurasi said the officials told her she had thrown an elbow. Taurasi disagreed, saying her head hit Douglas and the play actually messed up her bun.

Catchings made the technical free throw to take a 76–75 lead, then January was fouled on the possession Indiana gained after the technical, and she made two free throws.

"Lose by a head butt," Taurasi joked.

Through Game 3, ESPN2's telecasts are averaging 476,000 viewers (P2+), an increase of 51 percent when compared to last year's 316,000 viewers. In addition, the corresponding household impressions are up 50 percent (386,000 vs. 258,000) and the 0.4 rating is an increase of 33 percent over last year's 0.3 rating.

=== Game 4 ===
ESPN2HD

October 7
7:30 p.m.

Game 4

Phoenix Mercury 90, Indiana Fever 77
Scoring by quarter: 33–22, 16–25, 23–18, 18–12
Pts: Pondexter (22); Rebs: Willingham (8); Asts: Pondexter (7); 3PFG: T. Smith (4-6)	Pts: Catchings (24); Rebs: Catchings (12); Asts: Catchings, Douglas (4); FG: Catchings (11-17)
Series tied, 2-2

Conseco Fieldhouse, Indianapolis, IN
Attendance: 18,165
Referees:
- #9 Denise Brooks-Clauser
- #18 Kurt Walker
- #39 Michael Price

The high-scoring Phoenix Mercury saved their season with defense.

The Indiana Fever led the WNBA finals series 2–1 and had a chance to clinch their first title in front of an active sellout crowd that included local celebrities such as Indianapolis Colts players Peyton Manning and Reggie Wayne. None of that mattered as the Mercury beat the Fever 90–77 on Wednesday night to tie the series and force Game 5 Friday in Phoenix.

Indiana shot 2-for 13 in the fourth quarter, stifling any chance it had of overcoming the 72–65 deficit it faced going into the period. The Fever scored 12 points in the quarter, the third-lowest total in a fourth quarter in finals history.

Tamika Catchings, who led Indiana with 24 points and 12 rebounds, agreed that her teammates became hesitant. She said this is the wrong time for that.

Catchings shot 11-for-17 and Ebony Hoffman scored 17 points on 7-for-10 shooting. The rest of the team shot 11-for-44.

Phoenix's offense was in tune as usual. Cappie Pondexter scored 22 points, Penny Taylor added 17 points and Diana Taurasi and Tangela Smith each scored 16.

The Mercury shot 10-for-24 from 3-point range. Phoenix felt Indiana controlled the tempo and slowed it down the past two games, but the Mercury felt they regained control on Wednesday.

"Our strength all year has been in our confidence in our attack, and I felt we got that back," Taylor said. "We were playing with confidence and attacking every single time down floor, and that's hard to defend for 40 minutes."

Phoenix shot 72 percent from the field in the first quarter to jump out to a 33–22 lead. The Fever held the Mercury to 16 points in the second quarter and cut their deficit to 49–47 at the half.

Indiana tied the score at 59 on a layup by Catchings with 4:30 left in the third quarter, but Phoenix went on a quick 6–0 run to force a timeout and put the fans, who had been standing in anticipation of a Fever lead, back in their seats. The Mercury extended their lead to 72–65 at the end of the third quarter.

Indiana trimmed its deficit to 72–68 on a steal and layup by Catchings, but the Fever went cold and the Mercury pulled away with a 12–2 spurt. A 3-pointer by Taylor made it 84–70 with 2:33 to go.

Fever coach Lin Dunn was disappointed to lose at home, but focused on the fact that her team still could win the championship.

Through four games, the WNBA Finals averaged 521,000 viewers, up 65% from the 316,000 average for the Detroit Shock's three-game series sweep of the San Antonio Silver Stars, according to Nielsen data. Game 4, in which the Mercury evened matters, drew 670,231 watchers.

=== Game 5 ===
ESPN2HD

October 9
9:00 p.m.

Game 5

Indiana Fever 86, Phoenix Mercury 94
Scoring by quarter: 23–16, 19–35, 23–19, 21–24
Pts: Sutton-Brown (22); Rebs: Catchings (9); Asts: Douglas (9); Stls: Catchings (5)	Pts: Taurasi (26); Rebs: T. Smith (8); Asts: Taylor (5); FG: Pondexter (11-20)
Phoenix wins WNBA Finals, 3-2

US Airways Center, Phoenix, AZ
Attendance: 17,313
Referees:
- #4 Sue Blauch
- #39 Michael Price
- #55 Eric Brewton

The key to Phoenix Mercury's victory was credited to a trio of talented players.

Diana Taurasi, Cappie Pondexter and Penny Taylor - who led the team to its 2007 title - did it again in 2009, when the Mercury held off a late rally by the tenacious Indiana Fever for a 94–86 victory in the deciding Game 5.

League and finals MVP Taurasi scored 26 points, Pondexter had 24, and Taylor made two crucial free throws with 37.7 seconds left for the Mercury, who won the last two games to take the intense series 3–2.

When it was over, the three hugged in elation, and Taylor - the Australian who joined the team Aug. 1 after reconstructive ankle surgery - broke down in tears.

Tammy Sutton-Brown scored 22 points, and Jessica Davenport had a career-high 18 for Indiana in its first finals appearance. Tamika Catchings added 16 points and nine rebounds for the Fever.

Sutton-Brown pointed to the crucial home loss in Game 4.

"We had an opportunity to close it out at home, and we let that one slip away," she said, "but I think we came out and fought hard tonight. Phoenix is a great team. I think it was a great series. It was great for the WNBA."

Indiana rallied from 10 down in the second half to tie it at 80 on Sutton-Brown's layup with 4:29 to play, then Tangela Smith made two 3-pointers, her only field goals of the night, to put the Mercury ahead for good.

Pondexter's 9-footer made it 88–82 with 2:22 left, but the Fever - who had led the series 2–1 - weren't finished. Davenport's inside basket cut it to 88–84, then Catchings' rebound basket made it 88–86 with 2:07 to play.

On the Mercury's next possession, Taylor took the ball and drove the lane into a crowd of defenders. Davenport was called for the foul, and Taylor's two free throws made it 90–86. Two free throws apiece DeWanna Bonner and Taurasi provided the final margin.

Taylor added 14 points and Bonner 13 for Phoenix. Katie Douglas had her second straight rough shooting night. The Indiana star was 4 of 14 for 13 points after going 2 of 14 in Game 4. The Mercury made 10 of 17 3s.

Phoenix won it with the super-speed style that then-coach Paul Westhead used in 2007 and Corey Gaines adopted when he took over.

"When I first started coaching in the WNBA coach Westhead, who is my mentor - who we owe this championship to as much as him being here right now - he told me, `We're going to coach the players as players, not women, ball players'" Gaines said. "And it's funny how they embraced it because they enjoyed being treated that way. Instead of being treated as women basketball players, we treat them as ball players."

The five-game WNBA Finals series averaged 548,000 viewers (P2+), up 73 percent vs. last season (316,000). The series averaged 434,000 households, up 68 percent, and delivered a 33 percent ratings increase (0.4) from last year (0.3).

== Awards ==
- 2009 WNBA champion: Phoenix Mercury
- Finals MVP: Diana Taurasi

== Rosters ==
2009 Phoenix Mercury Finals roster
Players
Coaches

Pos.	No.	Nat.	Name	Height	Weight	From
G	24	(United States)	Bonner, DeWanna	6' 4" (1.93m)	136 lb (62kg)	Auburn
PG	2	(United States)	Johnson, Temeka	5' 3" (1.6m)	132 lb (60kg)	LSU
SG	33	(United States)	Mazzante, Kelly	6' 0" (1.83m)	155 lb (70kg)	Penn State
F/C	30	(United States)	Ohlde, Nicole	6' 5" (1.96m)	190 lb (86kg)	Kansas State
SG	23	(United States)	Pondexter, Cappie	5' 9" (1.75m)	160 lb (73kg)	Rutgers
F/C	21	(United States)	Smith, Brooke	6' 3" (1.91m)	195 lb (88kg)	Stanford
C	50	(United States)	Smith, Tangela	6' 4" (1.93m)	160 lb (73kg)	Iowa
PG	11	(United States)	Swanier, Ketia	5' 7" (1.7m)	144 lb (65kg)	Connecticut
F	13	(Australia)	Taylor, Penny	6' 1" (1.85m)	163 lb (74kg)	Australia
G/F	3	(United States)	Taurasi, Diana	6' 0" (1.83m)	172 lb (78kg)	Connecticut
PF	43	(United States)	Willingham, Le'Coe	6' 0" (1.83m)	200 lb (91kg)	Auburn

Head coach
(United States) Corey Gaines (Loyola Marymount)
Assistant coaches
(United States) Bridget Pettis (Florida)
(United States) Julie Hairgrove (Arizona)
Athletic trainer
(United States) Tanara Oiike (California State University)
Strength and conditioning coach
(United States) Tanara Oiike (California State University)

Legend

- (C) Team captain
- (DP) Unsigned draft pick
- (FA) Free agent
- (S) Suspended
- Injured

2009 Indiana Fever Finals roster
Players
Coaches

Pos.	No.	Nat.	Name	Height	Weight	From
PG	41	(Australia)	Bevilaqua, Tully	5' 7" (1.7m)	145 lb (66kg)	Australia
SF	24	(United States)	Catchings, Tamika	6' 1" (1.85m)	167 lb (76kg)	Tennessee
C	50	(United States)	Davenport, Jessica	6' 5" (1.96m)	215 lb (98kg)	Ohio State
SG	21	(United States)	Dixon, Tamecka	5' 9" (1.75m)	148 lb (67kg)	Kansas
G/F	23	(United States)	Douglas, Katie	6' 0" (1.83m)	165 lb (75kg)	Purdue
PF	32	(United States)	Hoffman, Ebony	6' 2" (1.88m)	215 lb (98kg)	USC
PG	20	(United States)	January, Briann	5' 8" (1.73m)	160 lb (73kg)	Arizona State
F/C	31	(United States)	Moore, Jessica	6' 3" (1.91m)	175 lb (79kg)	Connecticut
SG	14	(United States)	Murphy, Eshaya	5' 11" (1.8m)	164 lb (74kg)	USC
C	8	(Canada)	Sutton-Brown, Tammy	6' 4" (1.93m)	200 lb (91kg)	Rutgers
SF	34	(United States)	Wirth, Christina	6' 1" (1.85m)	185 lb (84kg)	Vanderbilt

Head coach
(United States) Lin Dunn (UT Martin)
Assistant coaches
(United States) Gary Kloppenburg (UC San Diego)
(United States) Jim Lewis (West Virginia)
Athletic trainer
(United States) Craig Stull
Strength and conditioning coach
(United States) Brandon Johnson (Purdue)

Legend

- (C) Team captain
- (DP) Unsigned draft pick
- (FA) Free agent
- (S) Suspended
- Injured
