= Kelly Miller (basketball) =

American basketball player (born 1978)

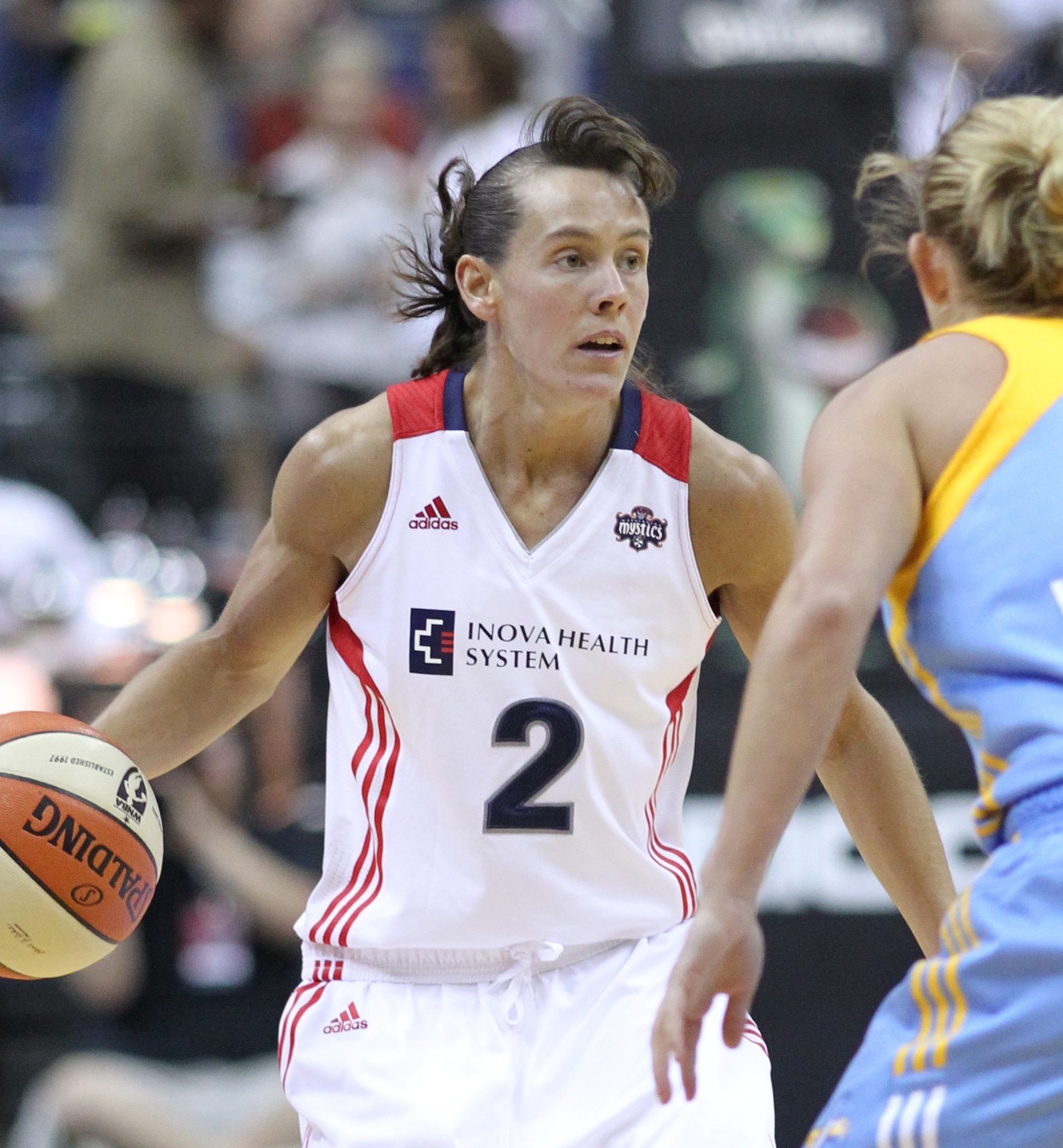

Personal information
- Born: September 6, 1978 (age 48) Rochester, Minnesota, U.S.
- Listed height: 5 ft 10 in (1.78 m)
- Listed weight: 140 lb (64 kg)

Career information
- High school: Mayo (Rochester, Minnesota)
- College: Georgia (1997–2001)
- WNBA draft: 2001: 1st round, 2nd overall pick
- Drafted by: Charlotte Sting
- Playing career: 2001–2012

Career history
- 2001–2003: Charlotte Sting
- 2004–2005: Indiana Fever
- 2006–2008: Phoenix Mercury
- 2009: Minnesota Lynx
- 2010: Atlanta Dream
- 2011: Washington Mystics
- 2012: New York Liberty

Career highlights
- WNBA Most Improved Player Award (2004); WNBA champion (2007); 3× Kodak All-American (1999–2001); 2× All-American – USBWA (2000, 2001); 2× All-American – AP (2000, 2001); James E. Sullivan Award (1999); 2× SEC Player of the Year (2000, 2001); 4× First-team All-SEC (1998–2001); SEC All-Freshman Team (1998); Co-Minnesota Miss Basketball (1997)
- Stats at WNBA.com
- Stats at Basketball Reference
Medals
Women's basketball
Representing United States
World University Games
Silver medal – second place	1999 Palma de Mallorca	Team competition

Kelly Miller (born September 6, 1978) is an American former professional basketball player. She is the identical twin sister of fellow basketball player Coco Miller.

== Early years ==
Born in Rochester, Minnesota, Kelly initially was interested in playing soccer and not basketball at high school, soon she joined her sister Coco. They also helped their school go 27–0 and win the Minnesota state's class 4A championship. Miller was named a WBCA All-American. She participated in the WBCA High School All-America Game where she scored thirteen points.

== College years ==
The twins went to University of Georgia, where they both majored in biology and won a series of awards, including the James E. Sullivan Award, given to the nation's top amateur athlete. They earned that award in 1999, becoming the first pair of twins to earn the award, and joining Carl Lewis, Greg Louganis, Bill Walton, Bill Bradley, Kurt Thomas, Jackie Joyner-Kersee and Janet Evans as recipients of the award.

Kelly ranked second in points among University of Georgia women players with 2,177; second in assists with 639; fourth in steals with 379 and tenth in rebounds with 711. She is the only player in UGA women's basketball to rank among the top ten in points, assists, steals and rebounds. She became the third player in that university's history to pass over 2,000 points, and the third player in the Southeastern Conference's (SEC) history to garner "Player of the Week" awards three weeks in a row.

=== Georgia statistics ===
Legend
GP	Games played	GS	Games started	MPG	Minutes per game
FG%	Field goal percentage	3P%	3-point field goal percentage	FT%	Free throw percentage
RPG	Rebounds per game	APG	Assists per game	SPG	Steals per game
BPG	Blocks per game	PPG	Points per game	**Bold**	Career high

Year	Team	GP	Points	FG%	FT%	RPG	APG	SPG	BPG	PPG
98	Georgia	28	489	40.1%	81.9%	5.7	**5.9**	**2.7**	0.2	17.5
99	Georgia	34	**628**	45.9%	**83.4%**	**6.0**	4.4	1.9	0.1	**18.5**
00	Georgia	**36**	544	44.5%	81.7%	4.7	4.5	2.1	0.1	15.1
01	Georgia	33	516	**51.1%**	82.5%	5.4	4.9	2.1	0.0	15.6
Career		131	2177	45.2%	82.5%	5.4	4.9	2.2	0.1	16.6

== USA Basketball ==
Miller played on the team presenting the US at the 1999 World University Games held in Palma de Mallorca, Spain. The team had a 4–2 record and earned the silver medal. Miller averaged 10.2 points per game.

== WNBA career ==
In 2001 both Kelly and Coco both entered the WNBA draft. Kelly was selected by the Charlotte Sting 2nd overall in the 1st round, where she averaged 4.6 points, 1.7 rebounds and 1.1 assists per game in her rookie year.

Kelly spent three seasons with the Sting as a utility player before she was traded to the Indiana Fever prior to the 2004 season. It was with the Fever that Kelly finally became a first-string player on the team, starting on all 34 games she played in the 2004 season.

After the 2005 season ended, Kelly was traded to the Phoenix Mercury, in exchange for Anna DeForge.

On January 30, 2009, Miller was traded along with LaToya Pringle to the Minnesota Lynx for Nicole Ohlde.

== WNBA career statistics ==
Legend
GP	Games played	GS	Games started	MPG	Minutes per game	RPG	Rebounds per game
APG	Assists per game	SPG	Steals per game	BPG	Blocks per game	PPG	Points per game
TO	Turnovers per game	FG%	Field-goal percentage	3P%	3-point field-goal percentage	FT%	Free-throw percentage
**Bold**	Career best	°	League leader

†	Denotes seasons in which Miller won a WNBA championship

=== Regular season ===
Year	Team	GP	GS	MPG	FG%	3P%	FT%	RPG	APG	SPG	BPG	TO	PPG
2001	Charlotte	26	0	8.7	.386	.368	.800	1.1	0.5	0.3	0.0	0.3	2.1
2002	Charlotte	32	0	17.3	.446	**.471**	.763	2.1	1.5	0.7	0.0	0.8	6.6
2003	Charlotte	**34**	0	15.4	.407	.423	.775	1.6	1.4	0.5	0.1	1.0	5.6
2004	Indiana	**34**	**34**	**32.2**	.387	.411	.877	3.2	3.1	1.1	0.1	2.2	10.2
2005	Indiana	**34**	**34**	31.1	.439	.325	.848	2.5	2.4	**1.2**	0.1	1.6	10.2
2006	Phoenix	27	24	30.1	.421	.380	.774	**5.3**	3.5	1.0	**0.2**	2.7	**11.0**
2007^{†}	Phoenix	**34**	**34**	30.6	**.479**	.386	.780	4.9	**4.6**	**1.2**	0.1	2.5	9.4
2008	Phoenix	**34**	**34**	27.8	.408	.385	.845	4.4	4.0	0.6	0.1	2.5	8.3
2009	Minnesota	**34**	25	19.9	.362	.333	.909	2.2	2.0	0.7	0.1	1.5	4.4
2010	Atlanta	30	1	16.4	.290	.329	.880	1.9	2.6	0.8	0.1	1.2	3.6
2011	Washington	**34**	29	27.7	.382	.441	.789	2.3	2.8	0.7	**0.2**	1.8	7.4
2012	New York	11	0	7.5	.167	.091	**1.000**	0.7	0.5	0.3	0.0	0.8	1.0
Career	12 years, 7 teams	364	215	23.2	.406	.392	.819	2.8	2.6	0.8	0.1	1.6	7.1

=== Playoffs ===
Year	Team	GP	GS	MPG	FG%	3P%	FT%	RPG	APG	SPG	BPG	TO	PPG
2001	Charlotte	2	0	4.0	.000	.000	.000	0.0	0.0	0.0	0.0	0.0	0.0
2002	Charlotte	2	0	6.5	.500	**1.000**	.000	1.0	0.0	0.0	0.0	0.5	2.5
2003	Charlotte	2	0	11.5	.400	.000	.000	0.5	1.0	0.0	0.0	0.5	4.0
2005	Indiana	4	4	**38.8**	.308	.529	.700	1.8	2.5	**1.3**	0.0	1.3	10.0
2007^{†}	Phoenix	**9**	**9**	33.0	.455	.308	.818	**5.3**	**3.6**	**1.3**	**0.1**	2.0	**11.7**
2010	Atlanta	4	0	6.8	**.750**	.500	**1.000**	0.5	1.5	0.3	0.0	0.8	2.5
Career	6 years, 4 teams	23	13	22.7	.412	.396	.771	2.6	2.2	0.8	0.0	1.2	7.3

== NWBL career ==
After the 2002 WNBA season, both sisters played for the Birmingham Power of the National Women's Basketball League (NWBL).

== International career ==
- 2002–2003: Fenerbahçe Istanbul (Turkey)
- 2003–2004: Fenerbahçe Istanbul (Turkey)
- 2004–2005: Chuncheon Woori Bank Hansae (WKBL, South Korea)
- 2005–2006: US Valenciennes Olympic (LFB, France)
- 2006–2007: Lattes-Maurin Montpellier (LFB, France)
- 2007–2009: Spartak Moscow Region (Russia)
