= Brooke Wyckoff =

American basketball player and coach (born 1980)

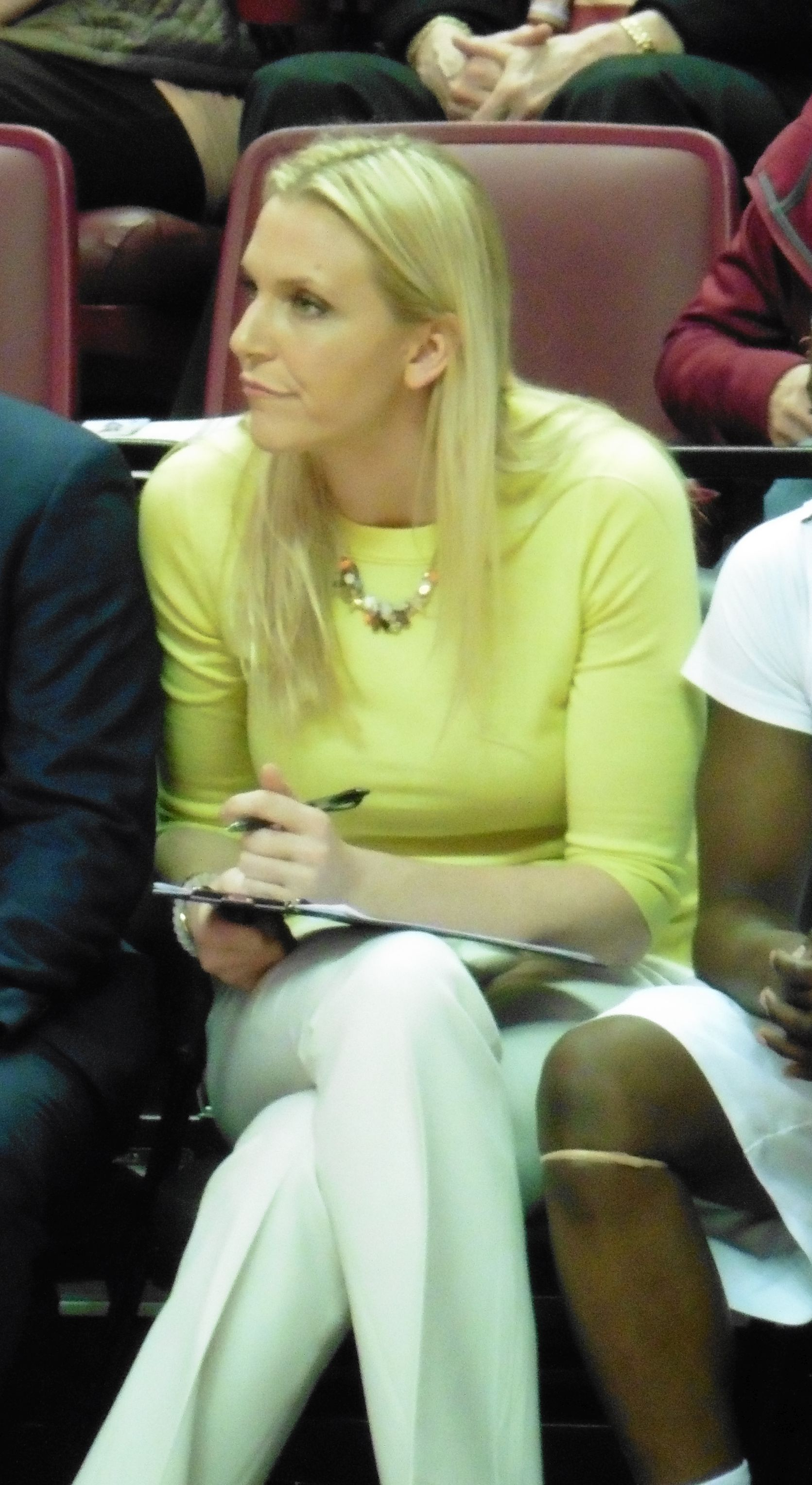
- Wyckoff coaching in February 2016

Florida State Seminoles
- Title: Head coach
- League: Atlantic Coast Conference

Personal information
- Born: March 30, 1980 (age 46) Lake Forest, Illinois, U.S.
- Listed height: 6 ft 1 in (1.85 m)
- Listed weight: 183 lb (83 kg)

Career information
- High school: Lakota (West Chester, Ohio)
- College: Florida State (1997–2001)
- WNBA draft: 2001: 2nd round, 26th overall pick
- Drafted by: Orlando Miracle
- Playing career: 2001–2009
- Position: Forward
- Number: 21
- Coaching career: 2011–present

Career history

Playing
- 2001–2002: Orlando Miracle
- 2003–2005: Connecticut Sun
- 2006–2009: Chicago Sky

Coaching
- 2011–2018: Florida State (assistant)
- 2018–2020: Florida State (associate)
- 2020–2021: Florida State (interim)
- 2021–2022: Florida State (associate)
- 2022–present: Florida State

Career highlights
- First-team All-ACC (2001); 2× ACC All-Defensive Team (2000, 2001); ACC All-Freshman Team (1998); No. 21 retired by Florida State Seminoles
- Stats at WNBA.com
- Stats at Basketball Reference
Medals
Women's basketball
Representing United States
World University Games
Silver medal – second place	1999 Palma de Mallorca	Team competition
Jones Cup
Gold medal – first place	2000 Taipei	Team competition

Brooke Wyckoff (born March 30, 1980) is an American former professional basketball player and current head coach of the Florida State Seminoles women's basketball team.

A 6'1" forward from Florida State, Wyckoff played in the WNBA from 2001 to 2009, competing for the Orlando Miracle, the Connecticut Sun, and the Chicago Sky.

Brooke played 132 games for the Sun, where she is remembered for the clutch three-pointer she hit in the final seconds of Game 2 of the 2005 WNBA Finals against the Sacramento Monarchs at Mohegan Sun Arena. That shot sent the game to overtime.

She played for CB Estudiantes in Spain during the 2008–09 WNBA off-season.

She tore her ACL and decided to retire following the 2009 season. She spent two years as an assistant girls' basketball coach at Lakota East High in Cincinnati before joining the Florida State women's basketball staff as an assistant coach in June 2011. She became head coach in 2022.

== USA Basketball ==
Wyckoff played on the team presenting the USA at the 1999 World University Games held in Palma de Mallorca, Spain. The team had a 4–2 record and earned the silver medal. Wyckoff averaged 7.0 points per game and led the team in rebounding, with 7.0 per game.

She competed with USA Basketball as a member of the 2000 Jones Cup Team that won the gold in Taipei.

== Coaching record ==
Record table
Season	Team	Overall	Conference	Standing	Postseason
Florida State Seminoles (Atlantic Coast Conference) (2020–2021)
2020–21 (interim)	Florida State	10–9	9–7	T–4th	NCAA First Round
Florida State Seminoles (Atlantic Coast Conference) (2022–present)
2022–23	Florida State	23–10	12–6	T–4th	NCAA First Round
2023–24	Florida State	23–11	12–6	T–5th	NCAA First Round
2024–25	Florida State	24–9	13–5	T–4th	NCAA Second Round
2025–26	Florida State	10–21	5–13	14th	
Florida State:		90–60 (.600)	51–37 (.580)		
Total:		90–60 (.600)			
National champion Postseason invitational champion Conference regular season champion Conference regular season and conference tournament champion Division regular season champion Division regular season and conference tournament champion Conference tournament champion

== Career statistics ==
Legend
GP	Games played	GS	Games started	MPG	Minutes per game	RPG	Rebounds per game
APG	Assists per game	SPG	Steals per game	BPG	Blocks per game	PPG	Points per game
TO	Turnovers per game	FG%	Field-goal percentage	3P%	3-point field-goal percentage	FT%	Free-throw percentage
**Bold**	Career best	°	League leader

=== WNBA ===
==== Regular season ====
WNBA regular season statistics
Year	Team	GP	GS	MPG	FG%	3P%	FT%	RPG	APG	SPG	BPG	TO	PPG
2001	Orlando	32	**27**	20.3	32.8	16.2	71.4	3.8	1.2	0.8	0.5	1.6	3.4
2002	Orlando	32	5	16.1	32.6	28.0	71.4	2.8	1.0	0.6	0.6	0.9	2.5
2003	Connecticut	**34**	22	22.2	38.7	28.6	72.2	**4.3**	1.0	**1.0**	0.6	1.1	**4.6**
2004	Did not play (injury)												
2005	Connecticut	34	1	17.5	**39.8**	**42.3**	65.0	2.8	1.0	0.4	0.3	**0.8**	3.1
2006	Chicago	15	13	**22.9**	24.2	23.3	80.0	2.7	**2.2**	0.9	**0.8**	1.1	3.3
2007	Chicago	34	7	15.3	37.6	35.8	76.9	3.2	1.4	0.6	0.5	**0.8**	2.9
2008	Chicago	34	23	17.5	34.2	31.4	56.3	2.3	1.4	0.4	0.6	1.0	2.2
2009	Chicago	27	23	19.7	37.8	39.2	**87.5**	2.7	1.4	0.4	0.7	1.1	3.1
**Career**	8 years, 2 teams	242	121	18.6	35.2	31.4	71.0	3.1	1.3	0.6	0.5	1.0	3.1

==== Playoffs ====
WNBA playoffs statistics
Year	Team	GP	GS	MPG	FG%	3P%	FT%	RPG	APG	SPG	BPG	TO	PPG
2003	Connecticut	4	**3**	**22.3**	**43.8**	16.7	**75.0**	**3.0**	**1.3**	**0.5**	0.3	**0.5**	**4.5**
2005	Connecticut	**8**	0	13.6	41.7	**40.0**	66.7	1.9	0.4	0.1	0.3	0.6	2.3
**Career**	2 years, 1 team	12	3	16.5	42.9	31.3	70.0	2.3	0.7	0.3	0.3	0.6	3.0

=== College ===
Ratios
Year	Team	GP	FG%	3P%	FT%	RBG	APG	BPG	SPG	PPG
1997-98	Florida State	27	**47.1%**	24.0%	61.9%	**8.00**	1.96	**2.96**	1.93	9.93
1998-99	Florida State	27	43.3%	27.8%	66.4%	7.90	1.48	2.37	**2.07**	13.70
1999-00	Florida State	24	40.9%	29.6%	74.7%	7.08	**2.54**	1.42	1.88	10.79
2000-01	Florida State	**31**	44.5%	**33.0%**	**78.4%**	6.60	2.40	1.00	1.20	**14.60**
Career		109	43.9%	30.5%	70.0%	7.38	2.10	1.92	1.73	12.39

Totals
Year	Team	GP	FG	FGA	3P	3PA	FT	FTA	REB	A	BK	ST	PTS
1997-98	Florida State	27	96	204	6	25	70	113	**216**	53	**80**	52	268
1998-99	Florida State	27	136	314	5	18	93	140	214	40	64	**56**	370
1999-00	Florida State	24	92	225	16	54	59	79	170	61	34	45	259
2000-01	Florida State	**31**	**161**	**362**	**33**	**100**	**98**	**125**	204	**75**	31	36	**453**
Career		109	485	1105	60	197	320	457	804	229	209	189	1350
