= Olympia Scott =

American basketball player (born 1976)

Personal information
- Born: August 5, 1976 (age 50) Los Angeles, California, U.S.
- Listed height: 6 ft 2 in (1.88 m)

Career information
- High school: St. Bernard (Playa Del Rey, California)
- College: Stanford (1994–1998)
- Position: Forward
- Number: 3

Career highlights
- 2× WNBA champion (2005, 2007); 2× All-All Pac-10 (1997, 1998)
- Stats at Basketball Reference
Medals
Women's basketball
Representing the United States
Jones Cup
Bronze medal – third place	1995 Taipei, Taiwan	Team Competition
World University Games
Gold medal – first place	1997 Marsala, Italy	Team competition

Olympia Scott (born Olympia Ranee Scott; August 5, 1976), formerly known under her married name of Olympia Scott-Richardson, is an American former professional basketball player in the WNBA, and a former college coach.

== Early life ==
Olympia Ranee Scott was born on August 5, 1976, in Los Angeles, California. She was named a Kodak High School All-American by the WBCA. She participated in the WBCA High School All-America Game in 1994, scoring eight points. Olympia was named Parade Magazine's Second Team All-America during her senior year at St. Bernard High School in Playa del Rey, California. Olympia was also the youngest player to participate in the US Olympic Festival in a team sport in 1994 while playing for the West team. She also posted the single-game shot-block record in the Festival that year, with four blocks. Scott also led St. Bernard High School of Playa del Rey, CA to its first 2 girls' basketball state championships her junior and senior years.

== College career ==
While attending Stanford University on full scholarship, Scott played on their women's basketball team (known as the Cardinal) for four years (1994 to 1998). She averaged 12.9 points and 6.4 rebounds per game during her four-year Stanford career. As a senior, she was a Naismith "Player of the Year" finalist and named an Associated Press honorable mention All-American and was a Kodak All-Region selection. She also was selected to participate in the inaugural Women's Basketball Coaches Association All-Star game after leading the Cardinal in steals (48) and blocked shots (14) in 1998. She was named to the All-All Pac-10 first team in 1997 and 1998. She competed with USA Basketball as a member of the 1995 Jones Cup Team that won the Bronze in Taipei and the 1997 World University Games Team that won the Gold Medal In Sicily, Italy. Scott also led the Stanford Cardinal as a four-year starter to four Pac-10 Conference Championships, including back-to-back undefeated in conference seasons, and only 2 conference losses her entire four years. She also led the Cardinal to 3 NCAA Final Four appearances.

A member of the Delta Sigma Theta sorority, Scott graduated with a Bachelor's degree in Sociology.

== Professional career ==
In the 1998 WNBA draft, Scott was selected by the Utah Starzz in the second round (#11 overall).

She missed most of the following season, due to the birth of her daughter on April 7, 1999. She returned to play in four games for the Starzz before she and teammate Wendy Palmer were traded on July 29 to the Detroit Shock, in exchange for Korie Hlede and Cindy Brown.

She played for the Shock until just prior to the 2001 season, when she was traded to the Indiana Fever. Having been being used as a utility player since her WNBA debut, Scott became a member of the Fever's starting lineup for the 2001 and 2002 seasons. Scott was named team captain of the Indiana Fever and awarded the Community Assist award for excellence in community service and leadership by the WNBA and the Fever. Started 31 games in her second season with the Fever, averaging career highs of 9.4 ppg and 6.8 rpg...in her best game ever as a professional, she led the Fever in scoring, rebounding, assists and blocked shots vs. Utah, 7/10...against the Starzz, she scored a career-high 31 points (11-17 FG, 9-11 FT) to accompany nine rebounds, four assists and two blocked shots in 39 minutes...she finished the season ranked 11th in the WNBA in rebounds per game...she hauled in the 500th rebound of her WNBA career vs. Charlotte, 7/22...she had five games with 10+ rebounds and posted three double-doubles, including consecutive games vs. Miami (14 points, 11 rebounds), 7/12, and vs. L.A. (12 points, 10 rebounds), 7/17...she was eighth in the WNBA in field goal percentage, shooting 48.7 percent from the floor.

After sitting out the 2003 season due to a knee injury, she signed a free agent contract with the Charlotte Sting, for the 2004 season. After that season, she was traded along with her Charlotte teammates Nicole Powell and Erin Buescher, to the Sacramento Monarchs in exchange for Tangela Smith and a 2006 WNBA draft second-round pick.

She spent the 2005 season with the Monarchs in a reserve role, but enjoyed the team's success as they went on to win the WNBA Championship, defeating the Connecticut Sun three games to one, in a best-of-five playoff.

On February 3, 2006, Scott, who had been a free agent after the 2005 season ended, signed a contract to return to the Indiana Fever. She played one year with the Fever, then was traded again in March 2007 to the Phoenix Mercury where she enjoyed winning a second WNBA Championship.

Olympia Scott is the first woman in WNBA history to win two WNBA Championships with two different teams.

Scott also served several years on the Women's National Basketball Players' Association (WNBPA) Executive Committee as the Secretary/Treasurer as well as an active member of the Negotiating Committee, participating in the last 2 Collective Bargaining Agreements between the WNBA and the WNBPA.

Scott has yet to officially retire from the WNBA where she has played a total of 10 seasons.

Olympia has also played in 6 different European countries for a total of 11 seasons including Russia for the Dynamo Moscow Region team; in Turkey for Mersin Buyuksehir, Istanbul University, Erdemir and the Ceyhan clubs; in Ibiza, Spain; Alcamo and Schio, Italy; Thessaloniki, Greece; and Yerevan, Armenia.

She retired from professional basketball in 2011.

== Coaching career ==
Scott once served as an assistant coach at the College of the Sequoias in Visalia, California, and has also coached AAU basketball as well as numerous camps and clinics.

In October 2004, she was named the head coach of the women's basketball team at William Smith College. Scott led her team to the Liberty League regular season and tournament championships, an appearance in the NCAA Division III regional semifinals, and the program's first 20-win season (20 wins against eight losses) since the 1999–2000 season. The team's efforts resulted in Scott and her coaching staff being voted by the conference as the Liberty League Coaching Staff of the Year.

However, after her Sacramento Monarchs team won the WNBA championship by defeating the Connecticut Sun, Scott resigned from her coaching position to devote herself full-time to her playing career.

== Corporate career ==
In 2003, she co-founded, together with her mother, Jacqueline Parker Scott, Ed.D., MBA, an online parenting education company named "Super Parenting LLC".

She is also co-founder of a coaching company called "A Wonderful Life! Coaching".

== Career statistics ==
=== WNBA career statistics ===
Legend
GP	Games played	GS	Games started	MPG	Minutes per game	RPG	Rebounds per game
APG	Assists per game	SPG	Steals per game	BPG	Blocks per game	PPG	Points per game
TO	Turnovers per game	FG%	Field-goal percentage	3P%	3-point field-goal percentage	FT%	Free-throw percentage
**Bold**	Career best	°	League leader

==== Regular season ====
Year	Team	GP	GS	MPG	FG%	3P%	FT%	RPG	APG	SPG	BPG	TO	PPG
1998	Utah	29	1	16.1	43.0	**20.0**	56.9	2.9	0.8	0.8	0.3	1.7	5.3
1999	Utah	4	0	9.0	30.0	0.0	50.0	2.0	0.5	0.3	0.0	0.8	2.3
1999	Detroit	8	0	6.5	33.3	0.0	66.7	1.5	0.4	0.0	0.4	0.6	2.0
2000	Detroit	28	0	13.2	41.6	0.0	65.0	2.9	1.0	0.4	0.4	1.6	3.6
2001	Indiana	32	30	24.2	45.6	0.0	73.9	5.0	1.3	0.7	0.4	2.3	8.8
2002	Indiana	31	**31**	**31.5**	**48.7**	0.0	**80.5**	**6.8**	**1.7**	**1.2**	0.4	2.2	**9.4**
2004	Charlotte	**34**	0	11.7	40.3	0.0	59.4	1.9	0.3	0.3	0.4	1.1	2.1
2005	Charlotte	18	0	9.4	35.9	0.0	50.0	1.8	0.3	0.2	0.1	1.2	2.1
2006	Indiana	21	0	7.4	43.4	0.0	50.0	1.6	0.3	0.3	0.1	0.7	2.4
2007	Phoenix	8	0	4.0	14.3	0.0	75.0	0.5	0.3	0.4	0.1	**0.4**	1.0
2008	Phoenix	6	0	11.5	36.4	0.0	0.0	3.2	0.5	0.2	**1.0**	1.0	2.7
Career	10 years, 5 teams	219	62	16.0	43.8	6.7	68.0	3.2	0.8	0.6	0.3	1.5	4.7

==== Playoffs ====
Year	Team	GP	GS	MPG	FG%	3P%	FT%	RPG	APG	SPG	BPG	TO	PPG
2002	Indiana	3	**3**	**33.0**	50.0	0.0	**100.0**	**8.0**	**1.7**	0.3	**0.3**	4.7	**7.0**
2005	Charlotte	**7**	0	5.4	50.0	0.0	50.0	1.0	0.7	0.0	0.1	0.4	1.3
2006	Indiana	2	0	13.0	**55.6**	0.0	0.0	2.5	0.0	**0.5**	0.0	1.5	5.0
2007	Phoenix	1	0	2.0	0.0	0.0	0.0	0.0	0.0	0.0	0.0	**0.0**	0.0
Career	4 years, 5 teams	13	3	12.7	50.0	0.0	85.7	2.8	0.8	0.2	0.2	1.5	3.1

=== College ===
Year	Team	GP	GS	MPG	FG%	3P%	FT%	RPG	APG	SPG	BPG	TO	PPG
1994–95	Stanford	23	-	-	46.6	0.0	58.5	4.6	0.8	0.8	0.5	-	6.1
1995–96	Stanford	32	-	-	49.1	0.0	63.8	5.1	0.7	1.1	**0.8**	-	10.3
1996–97	Stanford	**36**	-	-	55.0	0.0	**72.2**	**7.8**	1.0	1.2	0.6	-	16.2
1997–98	Stanford	27	-	-	**57.7**	0.0	68.6	7.5	**1.4**	**1.8**	0.5	-	**17.5**
**Career**		118	-	-	53.4	0.0	67.8	6.4	1.0	1.2	0.6	-	12.9
Statistics retrieved from Sports-Reference.
