= 2005 Connecticut Sun season =

- Head coach: Mike Thibault
- Arena: Mohegan Sun Arena

Results
- Record: 26–8 (.765)
- Place: 1st (Eastern)
- Playoff finish: Lost in WNBA Finals

The 2005 WNBA season was their seventh season and their third in Connecticut. The Sun attempted to return to the postseason for the third consecutive season and were successful. They also attempted to return to the WNBA Finals for the second consecutive year and were successful.

== Offseason ==
=== WNBA draft ===
Round	Pick	Player	Nationality	School/Team/Country
1	8	Katie (Feenstra) Mattera	United States	Liberty
2	21	Erin Phillips	Australia	Australia
3	34	Megan Mahoney	United States	Kansas State

=== Transactions ===
- May 16: The Sun waived Maria Conlon and Anna Montanana.
- May 11: The Sun waived Jess Strom.
- May 9: The Sun waived Jennifer Lacy.
- May 5: The Sun signed Taj McWilliams-Franklin to a contract extension.
- May 5: The Sun waived Erika Valek.
- May 3: The Sun waived Candace Futrell.
- April 29: The Sun waived Katie Endress, Beth Swink, Dena Williams, Petra Glaeser, and Shannon Howell.
- April 27: The Sun signed Beth Swink and Jennifery Lacy.
- April 22: The Sun signed Jess Strom.
- April 21: The Sun signed Katie Endress.
- April 19: The Sun signed Anna Montanana.
- April 18: The Sun signed Dena Williams and Maria Conlon.
- April 13: The Sun signed Erika Valek.

== Roster ==
2005 Connecticut Sun roster
Players
Coaches

Pos.	No.	Nat.	Name	Height	Weight	From
G	10	(United States)	Carey, Jamie	5' 6" (1.68m)	135 lb (61kg)	Texas
F	22	(United States)	Brungo, Jessica	6' 1" (1.85m)	165 lb (75kg)	Penn State
G	34	(United States)	Derevjanik, Jennifer	5' 10" (1.78m)	140 lb (64kg)	George Mason
G/F	32	(United States)	Douglas, Katie	6' 0" (1.83m)	165 lb (75kg)	Purdue
C	12	(Poland)	Dydek, Margo	7' 2" (2.18m)	223 lb (101kg)	Poland
F	15	(United States)	Jones, Asjha	6' 2" (1.88m)	196 lb (89kg)	Connecticut
G/F	24	(United States)	Mahoney, Megan (DP)	6' 0" (1.83m)	160 lb (73kg)	Kansas State
F/C	11	(United States)	McWilliams-Franklin, Taj (C)	6' 2" (1.88m)	184 lb (83kg)	St. Edward's College
G	31	(Australia)	Phillips, Erin (DP)	5' 7" (1.7m)	162 lb (73kg)	Australia
G/F	42	(United States)	Sales, Nykesha (C)	6' 0" (1.83m)	175 lb (79kg)	Connecticut
C	14	(Australia)	Summerton, Laura	6' 2" (1.88m)	167 lb (76kg)	Australia
G	13	(United States)	Whalen, Lindsay	5' 8" (1.73m)	150 lb (68kg)	Minnesota
F	43	(United States)	Willingham, Le'Coe	6' 0" (1.83m)	200 lb (91kg)	Auburn
F	21	(United States)	Wyckoff, Brooke	6' 1" (1.85m)	183 lb (83kg)	Florida State

Head coach
(United States) Mike Thibault (Saint Martin's)
Assistant coaches
(United States) Scott Hawk (Nebraska-Omaha)
(United States) Bernadette Mattox (Georgia)
Athletic trainer
(United States) Jen Brodeur
Strength and conditioning coach
(United States) Lisa Ciaravella (Lynn)

Legend

- (C) Team captain
- (DP) Unsigned draft pick
- (FA) Free agent
- (S) Suspended
- Injured

== Season standings ==
Eastern Conference	W	L	PCT	GB	Home	Road	Conf.
Connecticut Sun ^{x}	26	8	.765	–	14–3	12–5	13–7
Indiana Fever ^{x}	21	13	.618	5.0	14–3	7–10	14–6
New York Liberty ^{x}	18	16	.529	8.0	10–7	8–9	9–11
Detroit Shock ^{x}	16	18	.471	10.0	12–5	4–13	11–9
Washington Mystics ^{o}	16	18	.471	10.0	10–7	6–11	9–11
Charlotte Sting ^{o}	6	28	.176	20.0	5–12	1–16	4–16

== Schedule ==
=== Preseason ===
2005 Game Log: Preseason

Game	Date	Opponent	Score	High points	High rebounds	High assists	Location	Record
1	May 1	Minnesota	W 76-71	Whalen (13)	Willingham (7)	N/A	Mohegan Sun Arena	1-0
2	May 8	Charlotte	W 69-64	Jones (15)	Jones (6)	N/A	Mohegan Sun Arena	2-0
3	May 12	@ Houston	L 57-67	Whalen, Sales (14)	Dydek, Sales (7)	N/A	Toyota Center	2-1
4	May 14	@ Minnesota	W 91-66	Whalen (16)	McWilliams-Franklin (9)	N/A	Target Center	3-1

=== Regular season ===
2005 Game Log: Regular Season
May

Game	Date	Opponent	Score	High points	High rebounds	High assists	Location	Record
1	May 21	@ Detroit	L 67-78	McWilliams-Franklin (25)	McWilliams-Franklin (10)	Whalen (7)	Palace of Auburn Hills; 9,245	0-1
2	May 22	@ Washington	W 68-67	Douglas (16)	McWilliams-Franklin (6)	Whalen (4)	MCI Center; 11,155	1-1
3	May 28	Phoenix	W 85-68	McWilliams-Franklin (25)	McWilliams-Franklin (9)	Whalen (6)	Mohegan Sun Arena; 9,341 (sellout)	2-1

June

Game	Date	Opponent	Score	High points	High rebounds	High assists	Location	Record
4	June 4	San Antonio	W 80-69	Douglas, Dydek, McWilliams-Franklin (15)	Jones (7)	Douglas, Whalen (6)	Mohegan Sun Arena; 6,252	3-1
5	June 7	Seattle	W 81-69	Douglas (20)	Dydek (14)	Whalen (8)	Mohegan Sun Arena; 7,080	4-1
6	June 10	@ Houston	W 77-57	Sales (21)	Dydek (12)	Whalen (6)	Toyota Center; 5,736	5-1
7	June 11	@ San Antonio	W 78-69	McWilliams-Franklin (17)	Douglas, McWilliams-Franklin (9)	Whalen (6)	AT&T Center; 9,772	6-1
8	June 18	Detroit	W 73-63	Sales (17)	McWilliams-Franklin (10)	Whalen (6)	Mohegan Sun Arena; 7,427	7-1
9	June 20	@ Los Angeles	W 90-70	Sales (26)	Dydek (10)	Douglas, Whalen (6)	STAPLES Center; 7,246	8-1
10	June 22	@ Seattle	L 86-95	McWilliams-Franklin (21)	Dydek, McWilliams-Franklin, Whalen (5)	Whalen (6)	KeyArena; 8,120	8-2
11	June 24	@ Sacramento	W 61-50	McWilliams-Franklin (15)	McWilliams-Franklin (14)	Whalen (3)	ARCO Arena; 10,067	9-2
12	June 25	@ Phoenix	W 77-69	Sales (22)	Wyckoff (9)	Sales, Wyckoff (3)	US Airways Center; 8,091	10-2
13	June 28	Sacramento	W 70-66	Sales (19)	McWilliams-Franklin (7)	Whalen (5)	Mohegan Sun Arena; 6,789	11-2
14	June 30	Minnesota	W 71-56	Sales (18)	McWilliams-Franklin (9)	Whalen (6)	Mohegan Sun Arena; 6,869	12-2

July

Game	Date	Opponent	Score	High points	High rebounds	High assists	Location	Record
15	July 7	@ New York	L 79-89	Whalen (24)	McWilliams-Franklin (8)	Whalen (5)	Madison Square Garden	12-3
16	July 13	@ Indiana	L 53-64	Sales (15)	Douglas (7)	Whalen (4)	Conseco Fieldhouse	12-4
17	July 15	Houston	W 70-66	Sales (22)	Dydek (7)	Whalen (5)	Mohegan Sun Arena	13-4
18	July 17	@ Minnesota	W 72-53	Dydek (17)	Dydek (8)	Douglas, Dydek (4)	Target Center	14-4
19	July 19	@ Charlotte	W 64-55	Douglas (15)	Dydek (11)	Whalen (6)	Charlotte Bobcats Arena	15-4
20	July 20	@ Detroit	L 57-66	Sales (17)	McWilliams-Franklin (11)	Sales, Whalen, Wyckoff (3)	Palace of Auburn Hills	15-5
21	July 22	Charlotte	W 73-63	Sales (21)	Sales (8)	Whalen (7)	Mohegan Sun Arena	16-5
22	July 26	Indiana	W 68-55	Sales (19)	Dydek (12)	Whalen (5)	Mohegan Sun Arena	17-5
23	July 28	New York	W 73-70	Sales (21)	Douglas, Jones, McWilliams-Franklin (6)	Whalen (6)	Mohegan Sun Arena	18-5
24	July 30	Detroit	L 66-75	Dydek (16)	Dydek (9)	Douglas (4)	Mohegan Sun Arena	18-6

August

Game	Date	Opponent	Score	High points	High rebounds	High assists	Location	Record
25	August 2	@ New York	W 72-65	McWilliams-Franklin (19)	McWilliams-Franklin (7)	Whalen (6)	Madison Square Garden	19-6
26	August 6	@ Indiana	W 74-65	Sales (26)	McWilliams-Franklin (12)	Whalen (6)	Conseco Fieldhouse	20-6
27	August 9	Los Angeles	W 64-51	Douglas (22)	Douglas (8)	Whalen (6)	Mohegan Sun Arena	21-6
28	August 11	@ Washington	W 80-65	Sales (20)	McWilliams-Franklin (10)	Douglas, Whalen (4)	MCI Center	22-6
29	August 14	Washington	W 80-77	Sales (17)	McWilliams-Franklin (7)	Douglas (5)	Mohegan Sun Arena	23-6
30	August 18	Charlotte	W 84-70	Whalen (28)	McWilliams-Franklin (11)	Whalen (6)	Mohegan Sun Arena	24-6
31	August 20	New York	L 58-64	Whalen (22)	McWilliams-Franklin (11)	Sales, Whalen (3)	Mohegan Sun Arena	24-7
32	August 23	Indiana	L 63-69	McWilliams-Franklin (16)	McWilliams-Franklin (4)	Whalen (5)	Mohegan Sun Arena	24-8
33	August 26	Washington	W 81-47	Sales (20)	Dydek (11)	Whalen (4)	Mohegan Sun Arena	25-8
34	August 27	@ Charlotte	W 78-69	Jones (22)	Dydek, Jones (9)	Whalen (4)	Charlotte Bobcats Arena	26-8

=== Playoffs ===
In the first round of the Eastern Conference Playoffs, the Sun had to face the Detroit Shock. Since the Sun had the better record, the series would be played with game 1 at Detroit, game 2 at Connecticut, and game 3 (if needed) at Connecticut. Even though Detroit had won three of the four regular season meetings, the Sun swept the Shock and game 3 was not needed. In the second round of the Eastern Conference Playoffs, the Sun had to face the Indiana Fever. Again, the Sun had the better record and the series would be played with game 1 at Indiana and games 2 and 3 (if needed) at Connecticut. The Sun swept the Fever and game 3 was not needed. The Sun advanced to the WNBA Finals. The team would be facing off against the Sacramento Monarchs. The Sun had the better record so the series would be played with games 1, 2, and 5 at Connecticut and games 3 and 4 at Sacramento. In the regular season, the Sun had beaten the Monarchs in both meetings. It was not enough, however. The Monarchs beat the Sun 3 games to 1 to win the WNBA Finals.

- For the third consecutive season, the Sun qualify for the Eastern Conference Playoffs.
- For the third consecutive season, the Sun advance to the Eastern Conference Finals.
- For the second consecutive season, the Sun advance to the WNBA Finals.

2005 Game Log: Postseason
Eastern Conference Semifinals

Game	Date	Opponent	Score	High points	High rebounds	High assists	Location/Attendance	Series
1	August 31	@ Detroit	W 73-62	Sales (19)	McWilliams-Franklin (9)	Whalen (5)	Palace of Auburn Hills; 5,930	1-0
2	September 2	Detroit	W 75-67	Whalen (27)	Sales (12)	Whalen (3)	Mohegan Sun Arena; 8,167	2-0

Eastern Conference Finals

Game	Date	Opponent	Score	High points	High rebounds	High assists	Location/Attendance	Series
1	September 8	@ Indiana	W 73-68	McWilliams-Franklin (24)	Whalen (7)	Douglas (3)	Conseco Fieldhouse; 8,777	1-0
2	September 10	Indiana	W 77-67 (OT)	McWilliams-Franklin (15)	McWilliams-Franklin, Dydek (7)	Whalen, Derevjanik (4)	Mohegan Sun Arena; 7,588	2-0

WNBA Finals

Game	Date	Opponent	Score	High points	High rebounds	High assists	Location/Attendance	Series
1	September 14	Sacramento	L 55-79	Sales (23)	McWilliams-Franklin (10)	Sales (4)	Mohegan Sun Arena; 8,157	0-1
2	September 15	Sacramento	W 77-70 (OT)	McWilliams-Franklin (24)	McWilliams-Franklin (16)	Sales, Carey, Derevjanik (4)	Mohegan Sun Arena; 8,444	1-1
3	September 18	@ Sacramento	L 55-66	Sales (17)	McWilliams-Franklin (13)	McWilliams-Franklin, Whalen, Sales (2)	ARCO Arena; 14,073	1-2
4	September 20	@ Sacramento	L 59-62	Jones (21)	McWilliams-Franklin (10)	Whalen (5)	ARCO Arena; 15,002	1-3

== Depth ==
Pos.	Starting 5	Bench	Inactive
C	Margo Dydek	Brooke Wyckoff	Laura Summerton
PF	Taj McWilliams-Franklin	Asjha Jones
SF	Nykesha Sales	Le'Coe Willingham	Jessica Brungo
SG	Katie Douglas	Jennifer Derevjanik
PG	Lindsay Whalen	Jamie Carey

== Player stats ==
- http://www.wnba.com/sun/stats/2005/

== Awards and honors ==
- Taj McWilliams-Franklin and Nykesha Sales were named to the WNBA All-Star team.
- Taj McWilliams-Franklin was named to the All-WNBA Second Team.
- Katie Douglas was named to the All-Defensive First Team.
- Taj McWilliams-Franklin was named to the All-Defensive Second Team.
- Taj McWilliams-Franklin was given the Kim Perrot Sportsmanship Award.
- Lindsay Whalen was given the Off Season Community Assist Award.
- Taj McWilliams-Franklin was named WNBA Player of the Week for the week of June 13, 2005.
- Lindsay Whalen was named WNBA Player of the Week for the week of June 27, 2005.
- Katie Douglas was named WNBA Player of the Week for the week of August 15, 2005.
