= Kelly Mazzante =

American basketball player (born 1982)

Personal information
- Born: February 2, 1982 (age 44) Williamsport, Pennsylvania, U.S.
- Listed height: 6 ft 0 in (1.83 m)
- Listed weight: 155 lb (70 kg)

Career information
- High school: Montoursville (Montoursville, Pennsylvania)
- College: Penn State (2000–2004)
- WNBA draft: 2004: 2nd round, 18th overall pick
- Drafted by: Charlotte Sting
- Playing career: 2004–2011
- Position: Guard
- Number: 13, 33

Career history
- 2004–2006: Charlotte Sting
- 2007–2009: Phoenix Mercury
- 2011: Atlanta Dream

Career highlights
- 2× WNBA champion (2007, 2009); Women's Basketball Academic All-American of the Year (2004); 3× All-American – Kodak, USBWA (2002–2004); 2× First-team All-American – AP (2003, 2004); Second-team All-American – AP (2002); Big Ten Female Athlete of the Year (2004); 2× Big Ten Player of the Year (2003, 2004); 2× Chicago Tribune Silver Basketball (2003, 2004); 4× First-team All-Big Ten (2001–2004); Big Ten Freshman of the Year (2001); Big Ten All-Freshman Team (2001); NCAA season scoring leader (2002)

Career statistics
- Points: 933 (4.7 ppg)
- Rebounds: 327 (1.6 rpg)
- Assists: 173 (0.9 apg)
- Stats at WNBA.com
- Stats at Basketball Reference

Kelly Anne Mazzante (born February 2, 1982) is an American retired professional women's basketball player who last played for the Atlanta Dream of the WNBA. After her collegiate career, she was the all-time leading scorer in Big Ten basketball history (male or female). The record stood until she was surpassed on the scoring list by Rachel Banham in 2016. The record was subsequently surpassed by Kelsey Mitchell in 2018 and Caitlin Clark in 2024.

== Early life and college career ==
Mazzante attended Montoursville High School in Montoursville, Pennsylvania, which is also the alma mater of Mike Mussina, a pitcher for the New York Yankees. She scored over 3,000 points in high school and finished as the third-leading scorer in Pennsylvania girls' basketball history.

At an early age, Mazzante attended Penn State's Lady Lion Basketball Camp. She went on to attend college at Penn State, where she was a star member of the women's basketball team, mainly playing in the shooting guard position. Mazzante scored an outstanding 49 points and sank 9 three-point shots against Minnesota during her sophomore season. During her senior season, Kelly led her team to the Elite Eight, where they fell to the eventual champions, Connecticut. She earned Kodak All-American honors three times (2002, 2003, and 2004). She was the all-time leading scorer in the Big Ten Conference with 2,919 points in four seasons from 2001 to 2004. Through 133 NCAA appearances, she averaged 21.9 points per game. She also holds Big Ten records for Field Goals (1,051), Field Goals Attempted (2,403), 3 Point Field Goals (357), and 3 Point Field Goals Attempted (1,019). She was a recipient of the NCAA Top Eight Award as part of the Class of 2005. Mazzante's Penn State No. 13 jersey was retired on December 29, 2004. She completed her undergraduate degree in advertising/public relations in the off-season while assisting the women's basketball team.

Mazzante was also a member of the 2002 USA World Championship for Young Women Qualifying Team that won the gold medal.

== Career statistics ==
Legend
GP	Games played	GS	Games started	MPG	Minutes per game	RPG	Rebounds per game
APG	Assists per game	SPG	Steals per game	BPG	Blocks per game	PPG	Points per game
TO	Turnovers per game	FG%	Field-goal percentage	3P%	3-point field-goal percentage	FT%	Free-throw percentage
**Bold**	Career best	°	League leader

=== WNBA ===
==== Regular season ====
Year	Team	GP	GS	MPG	FG%	3P%	FT%	RPG	APG	SPG	BPG	TO	PPG
2004	Charlotte	**34**	0	10.0	33.7	25.0	66.7	1.0	0.3	0.2	0.1	0.6	2.3
2005	Charlotte	27	2	8.4	29.2	30.4	80.0	1.1	0.3	0.3	0.0	0.3	2.4
2006	Charlotte	**34**	0	**21.2**	37.9	**38.3**	84.8	**2.9**	**1.9**	**1.4**	**0.2**	1.4	**8.9**
2007	Phoenix	**34**	**3**	14.4	**38.8**	34.2	**100.0**	1.6	1.1	0.8	0.1	0.6	5.4
2008	Phoenix	**34**	2	18.9	33.2	33.1	83.3	1.9	1.1	0.7	0.1	0.5	5.8
2009	Phoenix	31	2	14.0	36.4	35.2	**100.0**	1.3	0.5	0.3	0.1	0.3	3.4
2010	Did not play (injury-ACL)												
2011	Atlanta	6	0	5.7	8.3	8.3	0.0	0.3	0.0	0.2	0.0	**0.2**	0.5
Career	7 years, 3 teams	200	9	14.4	35.4	33.6	86.3	1.6	0.9	0.6	0.1	0.6	4.7

==== Playoffs ====
Year	Team	GP	GS	MPG	FG%	3P%	FT%	RPG	APG	SPG	BPG	TO	PPG
2007	Phoenix	**9**	0	**14.6**	**42.2**	**42.9**	100.0	**2.0**	**0.7**	**0.4**	0.0	**0.1**	**6.4**
2009	Phoenix	4	0	3.5	0.0	0.0	0.0	0.5	0.0	0.0	0.0	0.3	0.0
Career	7 years, 3 teams	13	0	11.2	40.4	41.9	100.0	1.5	0.5	0.3	0.0	0.2	4.5

=== College ===
Legend
GP	Games played	GS	Games started	MPG	Minutes per game	FG%	Field goal percentage	3P%	3-point field goal percentage
FT%	Free throw percentage	RPG	Rebounds per game	APG	Assists per game	SPG	Steals per game	BPG	Blocks per game
TO	Turnovers per game	PPG	Points per game	**Bold**	Career high	*	Led Division I

Year	Team	GP	Points	FG%	3P%	FT%	RPG	APG	SPG	BPG	PPG
2000–01	Penn State	29	529	**46.8**	**36.9**	76.3	4.2	1.6	2.5	0.5	18.2
2001–02	Penn State	**35**	**872**	43.7	36.7	81.4	3.9	1.7	1.9	0.4	***24.9**
2002–03	Penn State	**35**	837	43.3	34.5	**84.2**	**4.6**	**2.2**	**2.5**	0.5	23.9
2003–04	Penn State	34	681	40.1	32.7	82.4	4.1	1.6	1.8	**0.7**	20.0
Career	Penn State	133	2919	43.3	35.0	81.9	4.2	1.8	2.2	0.5	21.9

== Professional career ==
Mazzante was selected in the second round of the 2004 WNBA draft by the Charlotte Sting, where she spent three seasons as a reserve guard. She scored a WNBA-career-high 18 points in an August 18, 2006, game against the Phoenix Mercury. After the Charlotte Sting folded in January 2007, Mazzante was selected in the 2007 WNBA dispersal draft by the Phoenix Mercury. She contributed to the Mercury's victory in the 2007 and 2009 WNBA Finals, primarily as a three-point shooting specialist. During her Phoenix Mercury days, Mazzante wrote a blog for PhoenixMercury.com called "Maz's Musings."

In March 2010, Mazzante was traded to the New York Liberty as part of a three-team, multi-player deal. However, she was released from the team a few weeks later, since she was in the middle of rehab for her ACL.

In the 2006–2007 WNBA offseason, Mazzante played in Slovakia for the Košice professional basketball team. In the 2007–2008 WNBA offseason, she played in Russia for Spartak. During the winters of 2008–09 and 2009–10, she played in Hungary for MiZo Pécs (PVSK). In 2011, she signed with the San Antonio Silver Stars and later the Atlanta Dream of the WNBA. On January 21, 2014, Mazzante announced her retirement.

== Personal ==
Mazzante has hosted her basketball camp for girls and boys in Phillipsburg during the fall of 2007.
