= Jennifer Derevjanik =

American basketball player (born 1982)

Personal information
- Born: March 29, 1982 (age 44) Staten Island, New York, U.S.
- Listed height: 5 ft 10 in (1.78 m)
- Listed weight: 140 lb (64 kg)

Career information
- College: George Mason University
- Position: Point guard

Career highlights
- First-Team All-CAA (2004); CAA Rookie of the Year (2001); CAA All-Freshman Team (2001)
- Stats at Basketball Reference

Jennifer Derevjanik (born March 29, 1982) is an American former professional basketball player. She last played the point guard position for the Phoenix Mercury in the WNBA. She currently coaches girl's varsity basketball at Bound Brook High School where she led them to their first state title in their programs history in her third year of coaching.

Derevjanik played college basketball at George Mason University, and was among the top five scorers in the university's history.

== George Mason statistics ==
Legend
GP	Games played	GS	Games started	MPG	Minutes per game
FG%	Field goal percentage	3P%	3-point field goal percentage	FT%	Free throw percentage
RPG	Rebounds per game	APG	Assists per game	SPG	Steals per game
BPG	Blocks per game	PPG	Points per game	**Bold**	Career high

Year	Team	GP	Points	FG%	3P%	FT%	RPG	APG	SPG	BPG	PPG
2000-01	George Mason	30	302	39.0	27.1	61.7	4.3	3.9	2.0	0.2	10.1
2001-02	George Mason	**31**	425	40.9	30.1	56.6	2.9	4.1	1.8	0.3	13.7
2002-03	George Mason	26	413	42.4	30.9	**75.7**	3.8	4.1	**2.2**	0.2	15.9
2003-04	George Mason	29	**497**	**43.7**	**36.4**	72.8	**4.0**	**4.2**	1.9	**0.4**	**17.1**
Career	George Mason	116	1637	41.7	31.2	67.0	3.7	4.1	2.0	0.3	14.1

== International career ==
In the 2004–2005 and 2005-2006 off-seasons, she played for Vilnius, Lithuania, in the FIBA Euroleague.
In the 2010-2011 off-season, she played for Panathinaikos in Greece.

== WNBA career ==
Derevjanik was undrafted. She was signed by the Connecticut Sun on April 26, 2004. She was released by the Sun at the end of training camp prior to the 2006 season, and signed with the Phoenix Mercury a few weeks later.

== WNBA career statistics ==
Legend
GP	Games played	GS	Games started	MPG	Minutes per game	RPG	Rebounds per game
APG	Assists per game	SPG	Steals per game	BPG	Blocks per game	PPG	Points per game
TO	Turnovers per game	FG%	Field-goal percentage	3P%	3-point field-goal percentage	FT%	Free-throw percentage
**Bold**	Career best	°	League leader

=== Regular season ===
Year	Team	GP	GS	MPG	FG%	3P%	FT%	RPG	APG	SPG	BPG	TO	PPG
2004	Connecticut	23	0	6.1	26.9	25.0	**1.000**	0.4	0.6	0.3	0.0	**0.4**	0.8
2005	Connecticut	**34**	1	10.6	36.4	14.3	43.8	0.9	1.2	0.3	0.1	0.8	0.7
2006	Phoenix	31	**8**	**15.1**	**50.7**	**26.7**	61.5	**1.8**	**2.2**	**0.7**	0.2	0.8	**3.1**
2007	Phoenix	23	0	8.7	43.3	10.0	81.8	1.0	1.0	0.3	0.0	0.7	1.6
2008	Phoenix	17	0	8.5	26.3	12.5	75.0	1.0	1.6	0.1	0.2	0.6	0.8
Career	5 years, 2 teams	128	9	10.2	41.3	19.2	62.7	1.1	1.4	0.4	0.1	0.7	1.5

=== Playoffs ===
Year	Team	GP	GS	MPG	FG%	3P%	FT%	RPG	APG	SPG	BPG	TO	PPG
2004	Connecticut	1	0	1.0	0.0	0.0	0.0	0.0	0.0	0.0	0.0	0.0	0.0
2005	Connecticut	**8**	**1**	**10.3**	**40.0**	0.0	**50.0**	**0.5**	**1.8**	**0.6**	0.0	0.8	**0.8**
2007	Phoenix	1	0	2.0	0.0	0.0	0.0	0.0	0.0	0.0	0.0	0.0	0.0
Career	3 years, 2 teams	10	1	8.5	40.0	0.0	50.0	0.4	1.4	0.5	0.0	0.6	0.6
