= Barbara Farris =

American basketball player and coach (born 1976)

Personal information
- Born: September 10, 1976 (age 50) Harvey, Louisiana, U.S.
- Listed height: 6 ft 3 in (1.91 m)
- Listed weight: 200 lb (91 kg)

Career information
- High school: St. Martin's (Metairie, Louisiana)
- College: Tulane (1994–1998)
- Playing career: 1998–2009

Career history

Playing
- 1998: New England Blizzard
- 1999-2000: RC Strasbourg (France)
- 2000–2005: Detroit Shock
- 2001-2002: Cavigal Nice (France)
- 2003: Ros Casares (Spain)
- 2004: Yongin Samsung (South Korea)
- 2005: Halcon Avenida (Spain)
- 2006–2007: New York Liberty
- 2006: CBK Mersin (Turkey)
- 2007: USK Prague (Czech Republic)
- 2008: Phoenix Mercury
- 2008: AS Athinaikos (Greece)
- 2009: Detroit Shock

Coaching
- 2009: Bonnabel High School (assistant coach)
- 2010-2020: John Curtis High School (head coach)
- 2012-2014, 2018–2019: New York Liberty (assistant)
- 2020–2022: Stetson Hatters (assistant)
- 2023–2024: Southern Miss (assistant head coach)
- 2025: Texas State (assistant)

Career highlights
- WNBA champion (2003); First-team All-CUSA (1997)
- Stats at WNBA.com
- Stats at Basketball Reference

Barbara Farris (born September 10, 1976) is an American basketball coach and former professional and collegiate player. A ten-year veteran of the WNBA, she won a league championship in 2003 and later built a championship-winning coaching career spanning the high school, collegiate, and professional levels.

Farris is a member of multiple halls of fame, including the New Orleans Sports Hall of Fame and the Louisiana High School Athletic Association Hall of Fame, recognizing her impact as both a player and coach.

== Coaching Career ==
=== High School Coaching ===
Farris began her coaching career in Louisiana and rose to prominence as head coach at John Curtis Christian School. Over a 10-year span, she complied a 291-64 record and led the Lady Patriots to five Louisiana state championships, including four consecutive titles from 2017 to 2020, and nine district championships.

Her program produced multiple Division I athletes, including Louisiana Miss Basketball and Gatorade Player of the Year JerKaila Jordan.

=== WNBA and Professional Coaching Roles ===
Farris served as an assistant coach for the New York Liberty (2012-2014, 2018-2019) and worked as a liaison to the National Basketball Retired Players Association from 2016 to 2017.

=== Collegiate Coaching ===
Stetson University (2020-2022)

Farris joined the Stetson University Hatters as an assistant coach, where she focused on the frontcourt development, During her tenure, the program recorded 43 wins over three seasons and posted a 20-win record in 2021-2022.

The University of Southern Mississippi (2023-2025)

Farris served as the assistant head coach at Southern Miss, contributing to both player development and program culture, leading to another 20-win season in 2023-2024. She oversaw academics, helping the team achieve the highest team GPA in program history.

Texas State University (2025)

In April 2025, Farris joined the Texas State Bobcats as an assistant coach under head coach Zenarae Antoine, and helped the team improve total scoring, field goal percentage, rebounding, and steals while doubling the Bobcats number of blocks from the year before.

== Early Life and High School Career ==
Farris was born in Harvey, Louisiana, and attended St. Martin's Episcopal School in Metairie. She was a standout multi-sport athlete, helping lead the school to back-to-back state basketball championships in 1993 and 1994, including an undefeated 36-0 season in 1993, garnering her earlyy recognition as a two-time all-Louisiana team member

She also contributed two state championships in track and field and earned All-State honors in basketball. For her accomplishments, she was inducted in the school's hall of fame in 2011.

== College Career ==
Farris played collegiate basketball at Tulane University from 1994 to 1998 under head coach Lisa Stockton. She became one of the most accomplished players in program history, earning all-conference honors in each of her four seasons, including first-team selections in 1995 (Metro Conference) and 1997 (Conference USA), and a WBCA/Kodak All-American honorable mention in 1997.

During her tenure, Tulane achieved significant milestones, including:

- The program's first NCAA Tournament appearance in 1995
- A 27-5 record in 1996-97, along with a Conference USA regular season and tournament titles
- Multiple NCAA Tournament appearances during her career

Farris finished her career in the Tulane record books with:

- 1,729 points (top six in program history)
- 939 rebounds
- A .637 career field goal percentage, the highest in Tulane history

Tulane Athletics inducted her into its Hall of Fame in 2024.

== Professional Career ==
Farris began her professional career in 1998 after being selected third overall by the New England Blizzard of the former American Basketball League.

She transitioned to the WNBA in 2000, beginning a 10-year career in which she played for:

- Detroit Shock (2000-2005, 2009)
- New York Liberty (2006-2007)
- Phoenix Mercury (2008)

Her career highlights include:

- WNBA Championship in 2003 with the Detroit Shock
- 280 games played
- 1,094 points and 777 rebounds

Farris also played professionally internationally in Europe and Asia from 2000 to 2008.

== Career statistics ==
=== WNBA ===
Legend
| GP | Games played | GS | Games started | MPG | Minutes per game | RPG | Rebounds per game |
| APG | Assists per game | SPG | Steals per game | BPG | Blocks per game | PPG | Points per game |
| TO | Turnovers per game | FG% | Field-goal percentage | 3P% | 3-point field-goal percentage | FT% | Free-throw percentage |
| **Bold** | Career best | ° | League leader |

==== Regular season ====
| Year | Team | GP | GS | MPG | FG% | 3P% | FT% | RPG | APG | SPG | BPG | TO | PPG |
|---|---|---|---|---|---|---|---|---|---|---|---|---|---|
| 2000 | Detroit | 14 | 2 | 9.3 | 50.0 | 0.0 | 55.6 | 2.3 | 0.1 | 0.4 | 0.1 | 1.0 | 3.2 |
| 2001 | Detroit | 31 | 10 | 18.0 | 46.9 | 0.0 | 63.8 | 3.5 | 0.5 | 0.2 | 0.2 | 1.0 | 4.2 |
| 2002 | Detroit | 32 | 16 | 17.6 | 41.9 | 0.0 | 73.8 | 2.9 | 0.5 | 0.4 | **0.3** | 1.2 | 4.5 |
| 2003 | Detroit | **34** | 0 | 15.4 | 43.4 | 0.0 | 65.1 | 2.4 | 0.7 | 0.3 | 0.1 | 1.2 | 3.7 |
| 2004 | Detroit | 26 | 0 | 16.2 | **51.3** | 0.0 | 66.7 | 2.3 | 0.3 | 0.3 | 0.1 | 1.0 | 4.5 |
| 2005 | Detroit | **34** | 1 | 13.1 | 34.2 | 0.0 | 61.1 | 2.5 | 0.6 | 0.2 | 0.0 | 1.3 | 2.4 |
| 2006 | New York | **34** | **34** | **27.8** | 43.0 | 0.0 | 72.4 | **5.2** | **1.5** | **0.6** | 0.1 | 1.9 | **7.7** |
| 2007 | New York | 28 | 0 | 8.5 | 34.5 | 0.0 | **81.3** | 1.5 | 0.5 | 0.2 | 0.0 | **0.7** | 1.9 |
| 2008 | Phoenix | **34** | 8 | 16.3 | 47.3 | 0.0 | 69.8 | 3.8 | 0.2 | **0.6** | 0.1 | 1.0 | 3.5 |
| 2009 | Phoenix | 13 | 3 | 8.5 | 22.2 | 0.0 | 81.3 | 1.4 | 0.4 | 0.4 | 0.0 | **0.7** | 1.3 |
| Career | 1 year, 1 team | 280 | 74 | 16.0 | 43.3 | 0.0 | 68.2 | 3.0 | 0.6 | 0.4 | 0.1 | 1.1 | 3.9 |

==== Playoffs ====
| Year | Team | GP | GS | MPG | FG% | 3P% | FT% | RPG | APG | SPG | BPG | TO | PPG |
|---|---|---|---|---|---|---|---|---|---|---|---|---|---|
| 2003 | Detroit | **8** | 0 | 16.6 | 40.0 | 0.0 | 64.7 | 2.5 | 0.5 | 0.1 | 0.0 | **1.3** | 3.9 |
| 2004 | Detroit | 3 | **2** | **26.0** | 35.3 | 0.0 | **75.0** | **5.0** | **0.7** | **0.3** | 0.0 | 1.7 | **6.0** |
| 2005 | Detroit | 2 | 0 | 6.0 | 0.0 | 0.0 | 0.0 | 0.5 | 0.0 | 0.0 | 0.0 | 0.0 | 0.0 |
| 2007 | New York | 3 | 0 | 4.0 | **60.0** | 0.0 | 0.0 | 0.0 | 0.0 | 0.0 | 0.0 | 0.7 | 2.0 |
| Career | 1 year, 1 team | 16 | 2 | 14.7 | 39.6 | 0.0 | 68.0 | 2.3 | 0.4 | 0.1 | 0.0 | 1.1 | 3.4 |

=== College ===
Legend
| GP | Games played | GS | Games started | MPG | Minutes per game |
| FG% | Field goal percentage | 3P% | 3-point field goal percentage | FT% | Free throw percentage |
| RPG | Rebounds per game | APG | Assists per game | SPG | Steals per game |
| BPG | Blocks per game | PPG | Points per game | **Bold** | Career high |

| Year | Team | GP | Points | FG% | 3P% | FT% | RPG | APG | SPG | BPG | PPG |
|---|---|---|---|---|---|---|---|---|---|---|---|
| 1994-95 | Tulane | 28 | 438 | 59.9% | 0.0% | 58.6% | 8.0 | 0.5 | 1.0 | 0.4 | **15.6** |
| 1995-96 | Tulane | 31 | **465** | 62.7% | 0.0% | 56.2% | 8.0 | 0.7 | 1.1 | 0.4 | 15.0 |
| 1996-97 | Tulane | **32** | 437 | 62.3% | 0.0% | 60.2% | 7.7 | **1.3** | **1.5** | **0.4** | 13.7 |
| 1997-98 | Tulane | 27 | 389 | **71.9%** | **100.0%** | **65.6%** | **8.2** | 1.1 | 1.3 | 0.3 | 14.4 |
| Totals | | 118 | 1729 | 63.7% | 50.0% | 59.6% | 8.0 | 0.9 | 1.2 | 0.4 | 14.7 |

== Honors and Recognition ==
Farris has been inducted into multiple halls of fames, including:

- Tulane Athletics Hall of Fame (2004)
- St. Martin's Episcopal School Hall of Fame (2011; team induction 2015)
- Greater New Orleans Sports Hall of Fame (2017)
- Louisiana High School Sports Hall of Fame (2024; 2025)

== Legacy ==
Farris is widely recognized for her success across all levels of basketball: as a championship-winning professional player, record-setting collegiate athlete, and a highly successful, championship-winning coach. Her contributions have been particularly significant in Louisiana, where she has influenced elite player development and the growth of girl's basketball.
