= Teana Miller =

American basketball player (born 1980)

Personal information
- Born: October 5, 1980 (age 46) Wilmington, North Carolina, U.S.
- Listed height: 6 ft 3 in (1.91 m)
- Listed weight: 220 lb (100 kg)

Career information
- High school: East Duplin (Beulaville, North Carolina)
- College: East Carolina (1998–1999); Tulane (2000–2003)
- WNBA draft: 2003: undrafted
- Playing career: 2003–2007
- Position: Center
- Number: 31, 37

Career history
- 2003–2005: Charlotte Sting
- 2007: Phoenix Mercury

Career highlights
- CUSA Sixth Player of the Year (2001)
- Stats at Basketball Reference

Clifeteana Rena McKiver Miller (born October 5, 1980) is an American former professional basketball player in the WNBA.

== East Carolina and Tulane statistics ==
Legend
GP	Games played	GS	Games started	MPG	Minutes per game
FG%	Field goal percentage	3P%	3-point field goal percentage	FT%	Free throw percentage
RPG	Rebounds per game	APG	Assists per game	SPG	Steals per game
BPG	Blocks per game	PPG	Points per game	**Bold**	Career high

Year	Team	GP	Points	FG%	3P%	FT%	RPG	APG	SPG	BPG	PPG
1998–99	East Carolina	19	180	54.5	–	48.0	5.5	0.3	0.8	2.2	9.5
1999-00	Tulane	Sat due to NCAA transfer rules									
2000–01	Tulane	32	258	54.5	–	52.5	5.3	0.7	0.6	1.8	8.1
2001–02	Tulane	**35**	**574**	**62.3**	–	55.0	**7.4**	0.7	0.9	2.3	**16.4**
2002–03	Tulane	29	372	56.9	**100.0**	**59.5**	7.1	**1.8**	**1.2**	**2.8**	12.8
Career	Combined	115	1384	58.2	100.0	54.5	6.4	0.9	0.9	2.2	12.0
