= Cappie Pondexter =

American basketball player (born 1983)

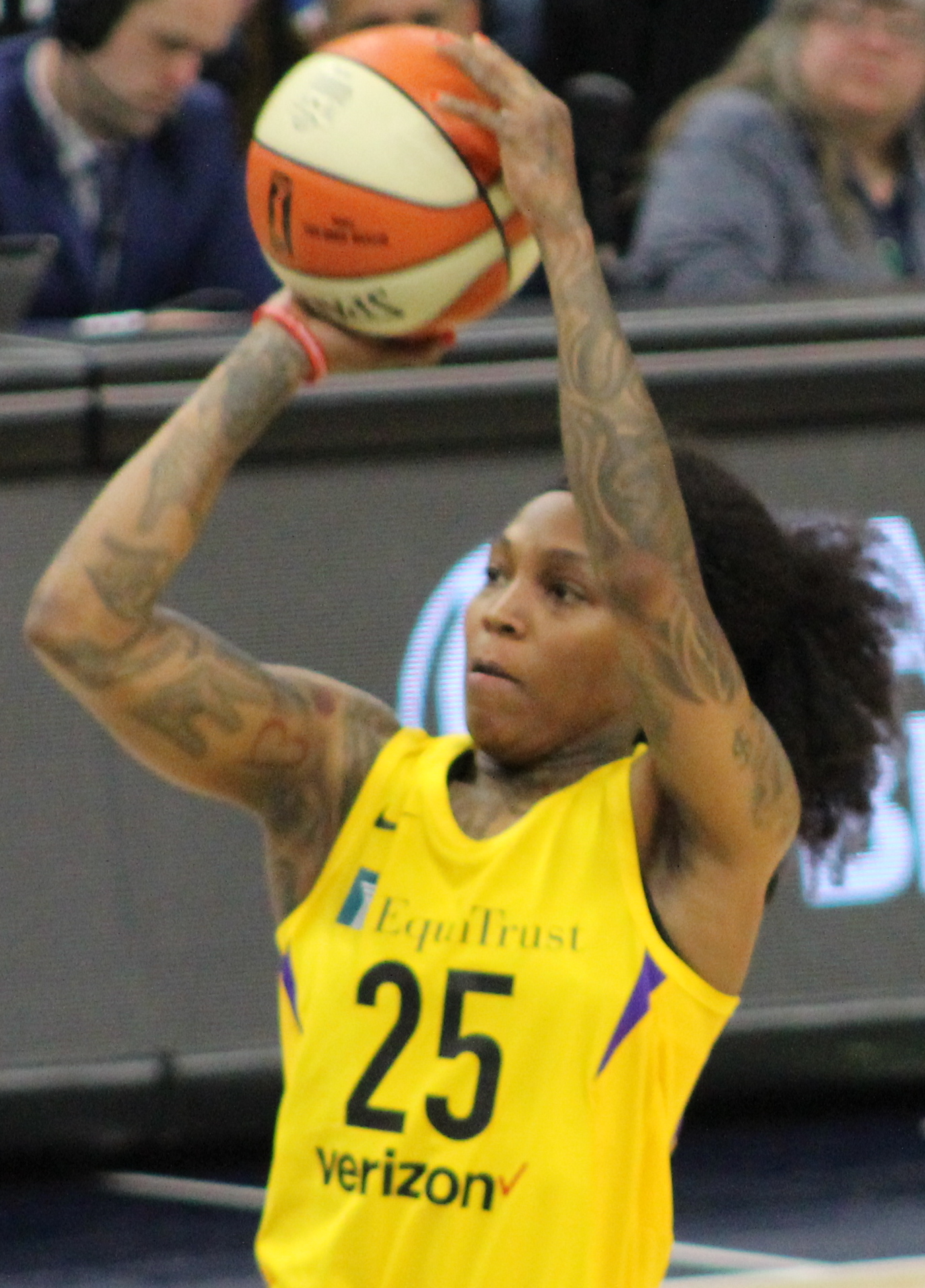
- Pondexter in 2018

Personal information
- Born: January 7, 1983 (age 43) Oceanside, California, U.S.
- Listed height: 5 ft 9 in (1.75 m)
- Listed weight: 160 lb (73 kg)

Career information
- High school: John Marshall Metropolitan (Chicago, Illinois)
- College: Rutgers (2002–2006)
- WNBA draft: 2006: 1st round, 2nd overall pick
- Drafted by: Phoenix Mercury
- Playing career: 2006–2018
- Position: Point guard
- Number: 23, 25

Career history
- 2006–2009: Phoenix Mercury
- 2006–2009: Fenerbahçe Istanbul
- 2008–2012: UMMC Ekaterinburg
- 2010–2014: New York Liberty
- 2012–2014: Fenerbahçe Istanbul
- 2015–2017: Chicago Sky
- 2015–2016: Beşiktaş
- 2016–2017: Girne Üniversitesi
- 2018: Los Angeles Sparks
- 2018: Indiana Fever

Career highlights
- 2× WNBA champion (2007, 2009); WNBA Finals MVP (2007); 7× WNBA All-Star (2006, 2007, 2009, 2011, 2013–2015); 3× All-WNBA First Team (2009, 2010, 2012); All-WNBA Second Team (2011); WNBA All-Defensive First Team (2010); WNBA All-Rookie Team (2006); WNBA anniversary teams (15th, 20th, 25th); WNBA Skills Challenge Champion (2009); 4× Turkish National League champion (2007, 2008, 2012, 2013); Turkish Cup winner (2007); 4× Turkish President Cup winner (2007, 2008, 2012, 2013); 2× Russian National League champion (2009, 2010); 3× Russian Cup winner (2009–2011); Kodak All-American (2006); All-American – USBWA (2006); First-team All-American – AP (2006); Third-team All-American – AP (2004); Big East Player of the Year (2006); 4× First-team All-Big East (2003–2006); Big East Rookie of the Year (2003); Big East All-Freshman Team (2003); 2× Illinois Miss Basketball (2000, 2001)
- Stats at WNBA.com
- Stats at Basketball Reference
- Women's Basketball Hall of Fame
Medals
Women's basketball
Representing the United States
Olympic Games
Gold medal – first place	2008 Beijing	Team competition
World University Games
Gold medal – first place	2005 Izmir	Team
FIBA Under-19 World Cup
Bronze medal – third place	2001 Czech Republic	Team
FIBA Under-18 Americas Championship
Gold medal – first place	2000 Argentina	Team

Cappie Marie Pondexter (born January 7, 1983) is an American former professional basketball player. She was born in Oceanside, California and raised in Chicago, Illinois. Pondexter is known for her scrappy play, quick crossovers and midrange jumpshot. In 2011, she was voted in by fans as one of the Top 15 players in Women's National Basketball Association (WNBA) history. She was inducted in the Women's Basketball Hall of Fame in 2025.

== High school ==
While growing up in Chicago, Pondexter was a friend of basketball star Dee Brown.

Pondexter played for John Marshall Metropolitan High School in Chicago where she was named a WBCA All-American. She participated in the 2001 WBCA High School All-America Game where she scored sixteen points, and earned MVP honors.

== College ==
Pondexter attended college at Rutgers University. She led the Scarlet Knights to a 97–22 record and back-to-back Big East Championships in 2005 and 2006. She competed in four NCAA Tournaments, including an Elite Eight appearance in 2005. During the 2005–2006 season, Rutgers compiled a 27–5 record, including a 16–0 record in Big East Conference play. Pondexter took home several awards, including the 2006 Women's Basketball News Service National Player of the year. In her career, the guard scored over 2,000 points.

== Rutgers statistics ==
Legend
GP	Games played	GS	Games started	MPG	Minutes per game
FG%	Field goal percentage	3P%	3-point field goal percentage	FT%	Free throw percentage
RPG	Rebounds per game	APG	Assists per game	SPG	Steals per game
BPG	Blocks per game	PPG	Points per game	**Bold**	Career high

Year	Team	GP	Points	FG%	3P%	FT%	RPG	APG	SPG	BPG	PPG
2002-03	Rutgers	29	532	47.7	35.8	79.8	**5.1**	**4.9**	1.8	0.2	18.3
2003-04	Rutgers	**33**	592	41.7	38.1	76.9	4.6	4.3	1.8	0.1	17.9
2004-05	Rutgers	27	397	46.0	45.8	79.1	3.5	3.1	1.8	**0.3**	14.7
2005-06	Rutgers	32	**690**	**48.3**	**48.8**	**81.0**	4.2	3.2	1.7	0.1	**21.6**
Career		121	2211	45.8	42.6	79.2	4.4	3.9	1.8	0.2	18.3

== WNBA career ==
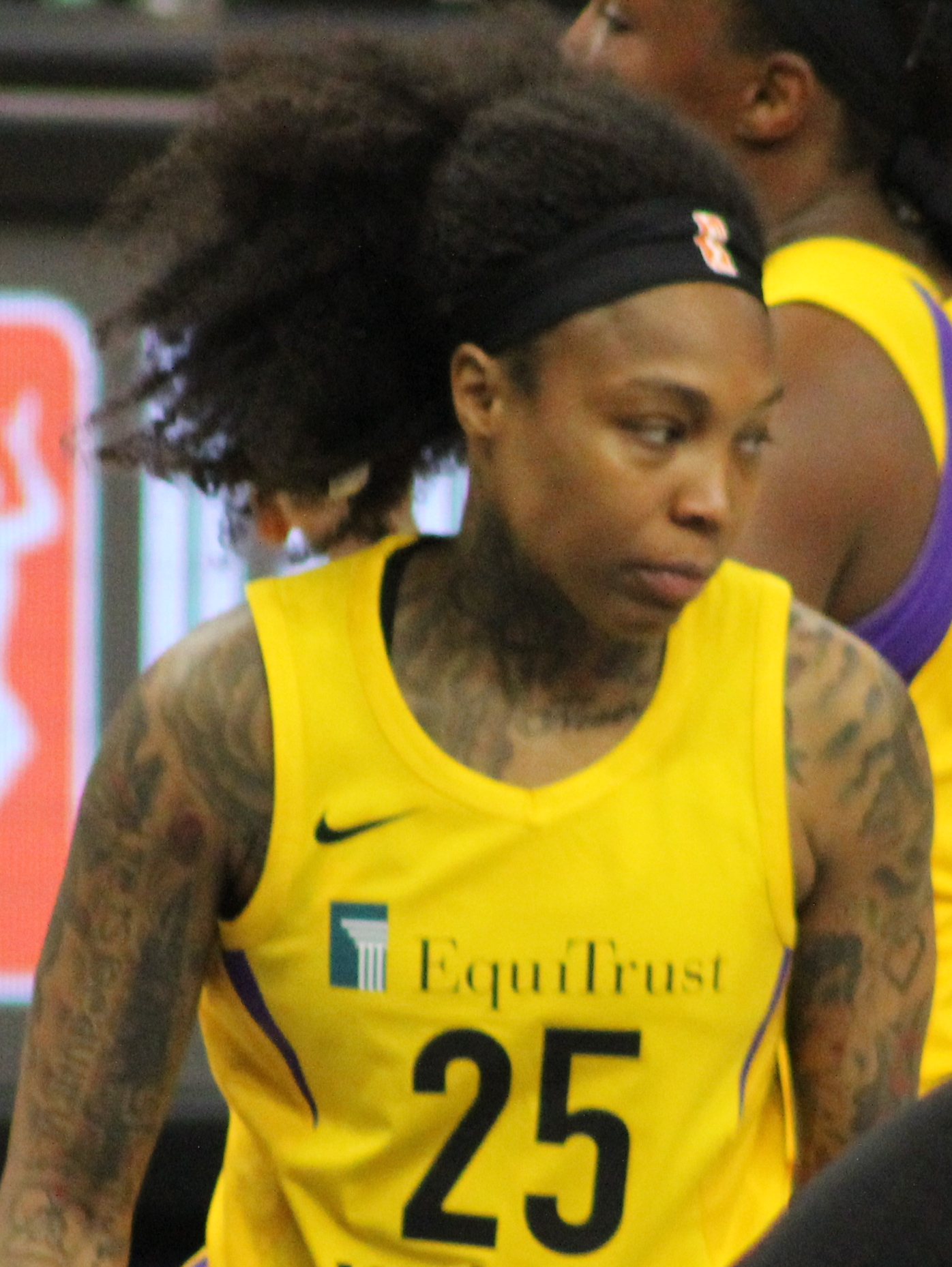
Pondexter in 2018

Pondexter was selected second overall in the 2006 WNBA draft by the Phoenix Mercury. As a rookie, she was named to the western conference WNBA all star team.

In 2007, alongside Diana Taurasi and Penny Taylor, Pondexter played a key role in the Mercury's championship run, and was named 2007 WNBA Finals Most Valuable Player after averaging 22 points per game during the hard-fought five-game series.

During the 2009 WNBA season, Pondexter became the first player in WNBA history to win three consecutive Western Conference Player of the week awards. She was also named to her third WNBA All-star team as a Western Conference reserve. At the end of the 2009 season, Pondexter helped the Mercury defeat the Indiana Fever 3 games to 2 to win the WNBA championship, the second title for the team in three years.

In March 2010, Pondexter was traded to the New York Liberty as part of a three-team, multiplayer deal. Pondexter indicated in interviews that she had requested the trade. In 2011, she was voted in by fans as one of the Top 15 players in the fifteen-year history of the WNBA.

In February 2015, Pondexter was traded to the Chicago Sky for Epiphanny Prince.

In 2016, Pondexter was named in the WNBA Top 20@20, a list of the top 20 players of all-time in the WNBA in celebration of the league's twentieth anniversary.

In 2018, Pondexter signed with the Los Angeles Sparks. On June 28, 2018 Pondexter was released by the Sparks.

On July 1, 2018, the Indiana Fever signed Pondexter to a free-agent contract.

On April 16, 2019, Pondexter announced her retirement from the WNBA after 13 seasons in a post on Instagram.

== Overseas career ==
The 2006–07 campaign marked Cappie Pondexter's first campaign in Europe. She was a major contributor to the success of the Fenerbahçe Istanbul club. When her side's quarter-final match-up against Ros Casares was tied at 67, Pondexter scored the winning basket with just seconds remaining to lift Fenerbahçe to victory. In that same game, she registered 10 assists and 4 steals. Pondexter was among the top five in scoring throughout the season.

- (Turkey) Fenerbahçe Istanbul (2006–08)
  - Turkish Championship: 2007, 2008
  - Turkish Cup: 2007
  - Turkish Presidents Cup: 2007, 2008
  - (Europe) 2006–07 FIBA Euro All-Star MVP
- (Russia) UMMC Ekaterinburg (2008–12)
  - Russian Championship: 2009, 2010
  - Russian Cup: 2009, 2010, 2011
- (Turkey) Fenerbahçe Istanbul (2012–14)
  - Turkish Championship: 2012, 2013
  - Turkish Presidents Cup: 2012, 2013

After successful two seasons at Fenerbahçe, Pondexter signed with the UMMC Ekaterinburg club in the Russian Superleague, where she played during the winters of 2008–09 and 2009–10.

She signed again with Fenerbahçe Istanbul for the 2012–13, 2013–14 European seasons.

In 2015, Pondexter signed with Beşiktaş JK for the 2015-16 European season.

In November 2016, Pondexter signed with Girne Üniversitesi for the 2016-17 European season.

== USA Basketball ==
On the international stage, Pondexter was a member of the USA Women's U18 team which won the gold medal at the FIBA Americas Championship in Mar Del Plata, Argentina. The event was held in July 2000, when the USA team defeated Cuba to win the championship. Pondexter averaged 6.6 points per game.

Pondexter was named to the USA Women's U19 team which represented the USA in the 2001 U19 World's Championship, held in Brno, Czech Republic in July 2001. Pondexter scored 11.0 points per game, and helped the USA team to a 6–1 record and the bronze medal.

Pondexter won gold medals with the USA at the 2008 Summer Olympics in Beijing, 2005 World University Games, 2003 FIBA World Championship for Young Women, 2002 World Championship for Young Women Qualifying Tournament and 2000 Junior World Championship Qualifying Tournament.

== WNBA career statistics ==
Legend
GP	Games played	GS	Games started	MPG	Minutes per game	RPG	Rebounds per game
APG	Assists per game	SPG	Steals per game	BPG	Blocks per game	PPG	Points per game
TO	Turnovers per game	FG%	Field-goal percentage	3P%	3-point field-goal percentage	FT%	Free-throw percentage
**Bold**	Career best	°	League leader

†	Denotes seasons in which Pondexter won a WNBA championship

=== Regular season ===
Year	Team	GP	GS	MPG	FG%	3P%	FT%	RPG	APG	SPG	BPG	TO	PPG
2006	Phoenix	32	32	33.4	.442	.373	.853	3.3	3.1	1.2	0.1	1.4	19.5
2007^{†}	Phoenix	31	31	31.2	.431	.333	.815	3.6	4.0	0.9	0.3	2.2	17.2
2008	Phoenix	32	32	31.3	.413	.313	.846	3.7	4.2	1.2	0.2	2.9	21.2
2009^{†}	Phoenix	**34**	**34**	31.6	.460	.358	.881	4.2	**5.0**	0.9	**0.4**	2.5	19.1
2010	New York	**34**	**34**	**34.3**°	**.483**	**.430**	**.892**	**4.5**	4.9	0.9	0.1	2.3	**21.4**
2011	New York	**34**	**34**	33.9	.402	.345	.815	4.1	4.7	**1.3**	0.3	2.7	17.4
2012	New York	**34**	**34**	34.2	.435	.327	.867	**4.5**	4.3	**1.3**	0.2	3.1	20.4
2013	New York	30	30	34.2°	.360	.369	.814	**4.5**	4.0	1.0	0.1	3.4	16.9
2014	New York	**34**	**34**	30.8	.388	.277	.769	3.4	3.9	1.0	0.1	2.6	13.2
2015	Chicago	29	29	30.2	.439	.381	.824	3.8	2.1	0.9	0.2	1.4	15.1
2016	Chicago	33	29	27.4	.429	.362	.882	2.8	2.7	0.9	0.0	1.5	12.9
2017	Chicago	29	15	27.2	.367	.257	.795	2.9	4.3	0.6	0.1	2.3	9.6
2018	Los Angeles	13	0	10.3	.349	.000	.895	1.2	0.8	0.2	0.0	0.3	3.6
2018	Indiana	17	14	24.2	.389	.393	.846	2.4	2.6	0.7	0.0	1.4	10.2
Career	13 years, 5 teams	416	382	30.7	.422	.350	.842	3.7	3.8	1.0	0.2	2.3	16.4

=== Postseason ===
Year	Team	GP	GS	MPG	FG%	3P%	FT%	RPG	APG	SPG	BPG	TO	PPG
2007^{†}	Phoenix	9	9	33.3	**.463**	.316	.873	4.8	**5.8**	**1.2**	0.1	1.8	23.9
2009^{†}	Phoenix	**11**	**11**	30.9	**.463**	.250	.886	3.6	3.5	**1.2**	0.0	1.4	18.2
2010	New York	5	5	**37.2**	.440	**.480**	.903	4.2	4.6	**1.2**	0.0	1.8	**28.4**°
2011	New York	3	3	34.7	.341	.214	**1.000**	**5.0**	5.3	0.3	**1.0**	2.3	14.3
2012	New York	2	2	33.0	.289	.100	**1.000**	4.5	5.0	2.5	0.0	1.5	17.0
2015	Chicago	3	1	22.5	.308	.000	**1.000**	1.0	1.3	0.6	0.0	**0.6**	6.0
2016	Chicago	5	5	28.1	.407	.200	**1.000**	1.2	1.8	1.4	0.2	2.2	12.4
Career	7 years, 3 teams	38	36	31.7	.427	.292	.908	4.4	4.0	1.2	0.1	1.7	18.8

== Awards and achievements ==
- 2003 Big East Rookie of the Year
- 2006 Big East Player of the Year
- 2009 WNBA All-Star Selection
- 2012 NBA All-Star Weekend Shooting Stars Competition champion

== 4 Seasons Style Management ==
Cappie started a style management company, 4 Seasons Style Management. 4 Seasons has now rebranded and moved to Los Angeles, California. While rebranding was happening in 2014, they continued to operate out of the New York headquarters.:

== Controversy ==
In March 2011, Pondexter drew controversy after posting comments on her Twitter account regarding the devastating 2011 Tōhoku earthquake and tsunami in Japan. Pondexter tweeted: "What if God was tired of the way they treated their own people in there [sic] own country! Idk guys he makes no mistakes." She later tweeted: "u just never knw! They did pearl harbor so u can't expect anything less." In response to the negative response to her comments, Pondexter replied: "I wanna apologize to anyone I may hurt or offended during this tragic time. I didnt realize that my words could be interpreted in the manner which they were people that knw me would tell u 1st hand im a very spiritual person and believe that everything, even disasters happen 4 a reason and that god will shouldnt be questioned. But this is a very sensistive subject at a very tragic time and I shouldnt even have given a reason for the choice of words I used. If youve lost respect for me thats totally fine but please dont let me or my words lose the respect of u the WNBA and what it stands for." [sic]

== See also ==
- List of WNBA career assists leaders
