= 2007 Chicago Sky season =

Women's National Basketball Association season

- Head coach: Bo Overton
- Arena: UIC Pavilion

Results
- Record: 14–20 (.412)
- Place: 6th (Eastern)
- Playoff finish: Did not qualify

The 2007 Chicago Sky season was the 2nd season in the WNBA for the Chicago Sky. Bo Overton was hired to be the new head coach and general manager after Dave Cowens resigned following the 2006 season.

Armintie Price became the first player in Sky history to be named WNBA Rookie of the Year.

== Transactions ==
=== Charlotte Sting Dispersal Draft ===
With the Charlotte Sting ceasing operation and based on the 2006 records of teams, the Sky selected 1st in the Dispersal Draft.

Pick	Player	Nationality	College	Previous team
1	Monique Currie	United States	Duke	Charlotte Sting

=== WNBA draft ===
Round	Pick	Player	Nationality	College
1	3	Armintie Price	United States	Ole Miss
1	10	Carla Thomas	United States	Vanderbilt
2	20	Stephanie Raymond	United States	Northern Illinois
2	21	Jessica Dickson	United States	South Florida
3	27	Jenna Rubino	United States	DePaul

=== Trades and Roster Changes ===
Date	Transaction
February 12, 2007	Signed Dominique Canty
March 1, 2007	Signed Kayte Christensen
March 20, 2007	Signed Cisti Greenwalt to a Training Camp Contract
March 23, 2007	Traded Chelsea Newton and the 21st Pick in the 2007 WNBA draft to the Sacramento Monarchs in exchange for the 10th Pick in the 2007 Draft
April 6, 2007	Signed Elisha Turek to a Training Camp Contract
April 9, 2007	Signed Chelsi Welch to a Training Camp Contract
April 10, 2007	Signed Armintie Price, Stephanie Raymond, Carla Thomas, and Jenna Rubino to Rookie Scale Contracts
April 10, 2007	Signed Christina Quaye to a Training Camp Contract
April 16, 2007	Renounced the rights to Francesca Zara
April 20, 2007	Signed Claire Coggins and Dionnah Jackson to Training Camp Contracts
May 1, 2007	Waived Elisha Turek
May 7, 2007	Waived Chelsi Welch, Christina Quaye, and Cisti Greenwalt
May 8, 2007	Signed Catherine Joens to a Training Camp Contract
May 14, 2007	Waived Dionnah Jackson
May 18, 2007	Waived Amanda Lassiter, Deanna Jackson, and Jenna Rubino
May 24, 2007	Waived Catherine Joens
May 24, 2007	Traded Monique Currie to the Washington Mystics in exchange for Chasity Melvin
July 5, 2007	Signed Catherine Joens

== Roster ==
2007 Chicago Sky roster
Players
Coaches

Pos.	No.	Nat.	Name	Height	Weight	From
G	3	(United States)	Canty, Dominique	5' 9" (1.75m)	166 lb (75kg)	Alabama
F	20	(United States)	Christensen, Kayte	6' 2" (1.88m)	171 lb (78kg)	UC Santa Barbara
G	14	(United States)	Coggins, Claire	5' 11" (1.8m)	170 lb (77kg)	Kansas State
G	12	(Canada)	Dales, Stacy	6' 0" (1.83m)	155 lb (70kg)	Oklahoma
F	4	(United States)	Dupree, Candice	6' 2" (1.88m)	178 lb (81kg)	Temple
G/F	9	(United States)	Joens, Catherine	5' 11" (1.8m)	165 lb (75kg)	George Washington
C	44	(United States)	Melvin, Chasity	6' 3" (1.91m)	195 lb (88kg)	NC State
F	52	(United States)	Moeggenberg, Liz	6' 1" (1.85m)	195 lb (88kg)	Michigan State
G	11	(United States)	Perkins, Jia	5' 8" (1.73m)	165 lb (75kg)	Texas Tech
G	22	(United States)	Price, Armintie	5' 9" (1.75m)	132 lb (60kg)	Mississippi
G	33	(United States)	Raymond, Stephanie	5' 5" (1.65m)	139 lb (63kg)	Northern Illinois
F	42	(United States)	Thomas, Carla	6' 3" (1.91m)	200 lb (91kg)	Vanderbilt
F	21	(United States)	Wyckoff, Brooke	6' 1" (1.85m)	183 lb (83kg)	Florida State

Head coach
(United States) Bo Overton (Oklahoma)
Assistant coaches
(United States) Steven Key (Boston University)
(United States) Stephanie White (Purdue)

Legend

- (C) Team captain
- (DP) Unsigned draft pick
- (FA) Free agent
- (S) Suspended
- Injured

=== Depth ===
Pos.	Starter	Bench
C	Chasity Melvin	Kayte Christensen
PF	Candice Dupree	Liz Moeggenberg; Carla Thomas
SF	Armintie Price	Brooke Wyckoff; Katie Cronin
SG	Stacey Dales	Claire Coggins
PG	Dominique Canty	Jia Perkins; Stephanie Raymond

== Schedule ==
=== Regular season ===
2007 Regular Season Schedule
Total: 14–20 (Home: 6–11; Road: 8–9)
May: 1–4 (Home: 0–2; Road: 1–1)

Game	Date	Opponent	Score	High points	High rebounds	High assists	Location/Attendance	Record
1	May 20	@ New York	71-83	Monique Currie (20)	Dupree; Curre (10)	Armintie Price (8)	Madison Square Garden; 11,341	0-1
2	May 22	Los Angeles	64-81	Dominique Canty (18)	Kayte Christensen (8)	Dominique Canty (4)	UIC Pavilion; 5,140	0-2
3	May 25	@ Minnesota	82-77	Candice Dupree (25)	Kayte Christensen (7)	Stacey Dales (6)	Target Center; 4,891	1-2
4	May 31	Connecticut	97-102 OT	Candice Dupree (29)	Dupree; Wyckoff (7)	Brooke Wyckoff (10)	UIC Pavilion; 2,634	1-3

June: 6–5 (Home: 2–4; Road: 4–1)

Game	Date	Opponent	Score	High points	High rebounds	High assists	Location/Attendance	Record
5	June 1	@ Washington	75-70	Dupree; Perkins (19)	Chasity Melvin (15)	Dominique Canty (7)	Verizon Center; 6,391	2-3
6	June 3	Minnesota	78-72	Candice Dupree (20)	Candice Dupree (11)	Dominique Canty (5)	UIC Pavilion; 3,477	3-3
7	June 7	@ Phoenix	66-80	Chasity Melvin (15)	Chasity Melvin (11)	Canty; Melvin (3)	US Airways Center; 6,161	3-4
8	June 9	@ San Antonio	70-60	Candice Dupree (22)	Chasity Melvin (12)	Stacey Dales (5)	AT&T Center; 9,899	4-4
9	June 12	Seattle	69-81	Candice Dupree (18)	Armintie Price (12)	Stacey Dales (7)	UIC Pavilion; 2,645	4-5
10	June 15	New York	73-66	Candice Dupree (24)	Candice Dupree (13)	Armintie Price (6)	UIC Pavilion; 3,236	5-5
11	June 17	@ Connecticut	87-74	Candice Dupree (28)	Dupree; Melvin (8)	Dominique Canty (6)	Mohegan Sun Arena; 7,614	6-5
12	June 19	Sacramento	52-54	Candice Dupree (21)	Candice Dupree (14)	Dominique Canty (7)	UIC Pavilion; 2,505	6-6
13	June 23	Washington	86-99	Candice Dupree (26)	Melvin; Price (9)	Armintie Price (6)	UIC Pavilion; 3,617	6-7
14	June 26	@ Seattle	76-94	Jia Perkins (19)	Dupree; Price; Perkins (7)	Price; Dupree; Raymond (4)	KeyArena; 6,752	6-8
15	June 29	@ Sacramento	92-84 2OT	Jia Perkins (39)	Armintie Price (9)	Jia Perkins (10)	ARCO Arena; 6,862	7-8

July: 5–6 (Home: 3–3; Road: 2–3)

Game	Date	Opponent	Score	High points	High rebounds	High assists	Location/Attendance	Record
16	July 1	@ Los Angeles	74-71 OT	Candice Dupree (24)	Candice Dupree (11)	Armintie Price (6)	Staples Center; 7,522	8-8
17	July 7	Washington	73-77	Candice Dupree (24)	Candice Dupree (11)	Stacey Dales (6)	UIC Pavilion; 3,161	8-9
18	July 8	@ Indiana	70-86	Catherine Joens (16)	Candice Dupree (9)	Jia Perkins (4)	Bankers Life Fieldhouse; 8,247	8-10
19	July 10	@ Detroit	84-92	Jia Perkins (22)	Candice Dupree (10)	Jia Perkins (4)	Palace of Auburn Hills; 8,975	8-11
20	July 12	Detroit	65-78	Jia Perkins (17)	Candice Dupree (6)	Catherine Joens (5)	UIC Pavilion; 3,085	8-12
21	July 18	@ Indiana	74-75	Jia Perkins (24)	Armintie Price (7)	Price; Canty (3)	Bankers Life Fieldhouse; 10,542	8-13
22	July 21	Indiana	68-65	Jia Perkins (17)	Armintie Price (8)	Dominique Canty (5)	UIC Pavilion; 3,383	9-13
23	July 22	San Antonio	84-82 OT	Jia Perkins (27)	Armintie Price (7)	Stacey Dales (4)	UIC Pavilion; 3,286	10-13
24	July 26	@ Detroit	83-73	Candice Dupree (24)	Candice Dupree (12)	Dominique Canty (5)	Palace of Auburn Hills; 9,238	11-13
25	July 27	Phoenix	96-98	Stacey Dales (23)	Melvin; Price (8)	Dominique Canty (8)	UIC Pavilion; 4,053	11-14
26	July 29	Houston	88-70	Stacey Dales (18)	Chasity Melvin (5)	Dominique Canty (8)	UIC Pavilion; 3,469	12-14
27	July 31	@ Connecticut	56-74	Jia Perkins (17)	Dupree; Perkins (7)	Canty; Joens (3)	Mohegan Sun Arena; 8,048	12-15

August: 2–5 (Home: 1–3; Road: 1–2)

Game	Date	Opponent	Score	High points	High rebounds	High assists	Location/Attendance	Record
28	August 3	Detroit	60-66	Jia Perkins (19)	Jia Perkins (7)	Price; Canty; Perkins (3)	UIC Pavilion; 4,635	12-16
29	August 5	@ Washington	66-71	Candice Dupree (18)	Chasity Melvin (12)	Dominique Canty (5)	Verizon Center; 8,395	12-17
30	August 7	Indiana	70-75 2OT	Chasity Melvin (26)	Candice Dupree (20)	Canty; Dales; Perkins (4)	UIC Pavilion; 5,029	12-18
31	August 11	Connecticut	66-88	Candice Dupree (18)	Candice Dupree (6)	Melvin; Perkins (4)	UIC Pavilion; 4,261	12-19
32	August 14	New York	77-65	Jia Perkins (24)	Brooke Wyckoff (10)	Dominique Canty (9)	UIC Pavilion; 5,443	13-19
33	August 16	@ Houston	81-70	Stacey Dales (17)	Candice Dupree (9)	Dominique Canty (7)	Toyota Center; 6,814	14-19
34	August 19	@ New York	52-58	Dominique Canty (14)	Brooke Wyckoff (9)	Dominique Canty (2)	Madison Square Garden; 9,520	14-20

== Standings ==
Eastern Conference	W	L	PCT	GB	Home	Road	Conf.
Detroit Shock ^{x}	24	10	.706	–	12–5	12–5	14–6
Indiana Fever ^{x}	21	13	.618	3.0	12–5	9–8	12–8
Connecticut Sun ^{x}	18	16	.529	6.0	8–9	10–7	10–10
New York Liberty ^{x}	16	18	.471	8.0	10–7	6–11	10–10
Washington Mystics ^{o}	16	18	.471	8.0	8–9	8–9	8–12
Chicago Sky ^{o}	14	20	.412	10.0	6–11	8–9	6–14

== Statistics ==
Legend
GP	Games played	GS	Games started	MPG	Minutes per game	RPG	Rebounds per game
APG	Assists per game	SPG	Steals per game	BPG	Blocks per game	PPG	Points per game
FG%	Field-goal percentage	3P%	3-point field-goal percentage	FT%	Free-throw percentage	TO	Turnovers per game
PF	Fouls per game		Team leader		League leader

=== Regular season ===
Player	GP	GS	MPG	FG%	3P%	FT%	RPG	APG	SPG	BPG	PPG
Candice Dupree	33	33	32.7	44.6	0.0	77.5	7.7	1.4	0.9	1.2	16.5
Monique Currie	2	2	30.5	29.6	18.2	73.3	6.0	2.0	0.5	0.0	14.5
Jia Perkins	33	5	23.1	46.4	43.3	77.4	3.3	2.3	1.5	0.2	11.7
Stacey Dales	31	30	27.3	34.7	33.8	84.6	1.8	2.7	0.6	0.0	10.3
Chasity Melvin	29	25	29.4	46.8	20.0	62.7	6.7	1.3	1.1	0.8	9.9
Dominique Canty	30	27	25.9	36.1	25.0	70.4	2.1	4.1	1.0	0.1	8.6
Armintie Price	34	34	26.3	40.9	33.3	51.7	6.0	2.9	1.2	0.2	7.9
Catherine Joens	19	0	14.3	39.2	48.9	84.6	1.7	1.7	0.9	0.1	5.0
Stephanie Raymond	20	0	9.0	32.8	31.8	53.8	0.7	1.4	0.2	0.0	3.1
Brooke Wyckoff	34	7	15.3	37.6	35.8	76.9	3.2	1.4	0.6	0.5	2.9
Claire Coggins	20	1	9.8	24.7	20.0	25.0	0.8	0.4	0.3	0.1	2.5
Carla Thomas	17	0	7.2	39.5	0.0	92.9	1.6	0.2	0.1	0.2	2.5
Kayte Christensen	23	7	9.2	41.7	0.0	44.4	1.9	0.3	0.4	0.2	2.1
Liz Moeggenberg	23	0	9.0	41.5	16.7	40.0	1.3	0.3	0.1	0.1	1.6

== Awards and honors ==
Recipient	Award	Date awarded	Ref.
Armintie Price	WNBA Rookie of the Year	September 8	
Armintie Price	WNBA All-Rookie Team	September 8	
Candice Dupree	Eastern Conference Player of the Week	June 20	
Candice Dupree	WNBA All-Star Selection	July 8	
Jia Perkins	Eastern Conference Player of the Week	July 2	
