= List of WNBA career turnovers leaders =

This article provides two lists:

A list of Women's National Basketball Association players by total career regular season turnovers recorded.
A progressive list of turnover leaders showing how the record increased through the years.

== Turnovers leaders ==
This is a list of National Basketball Association players by total career regular season turnovers recorded.

Statistics accurate as of the 2026 season.

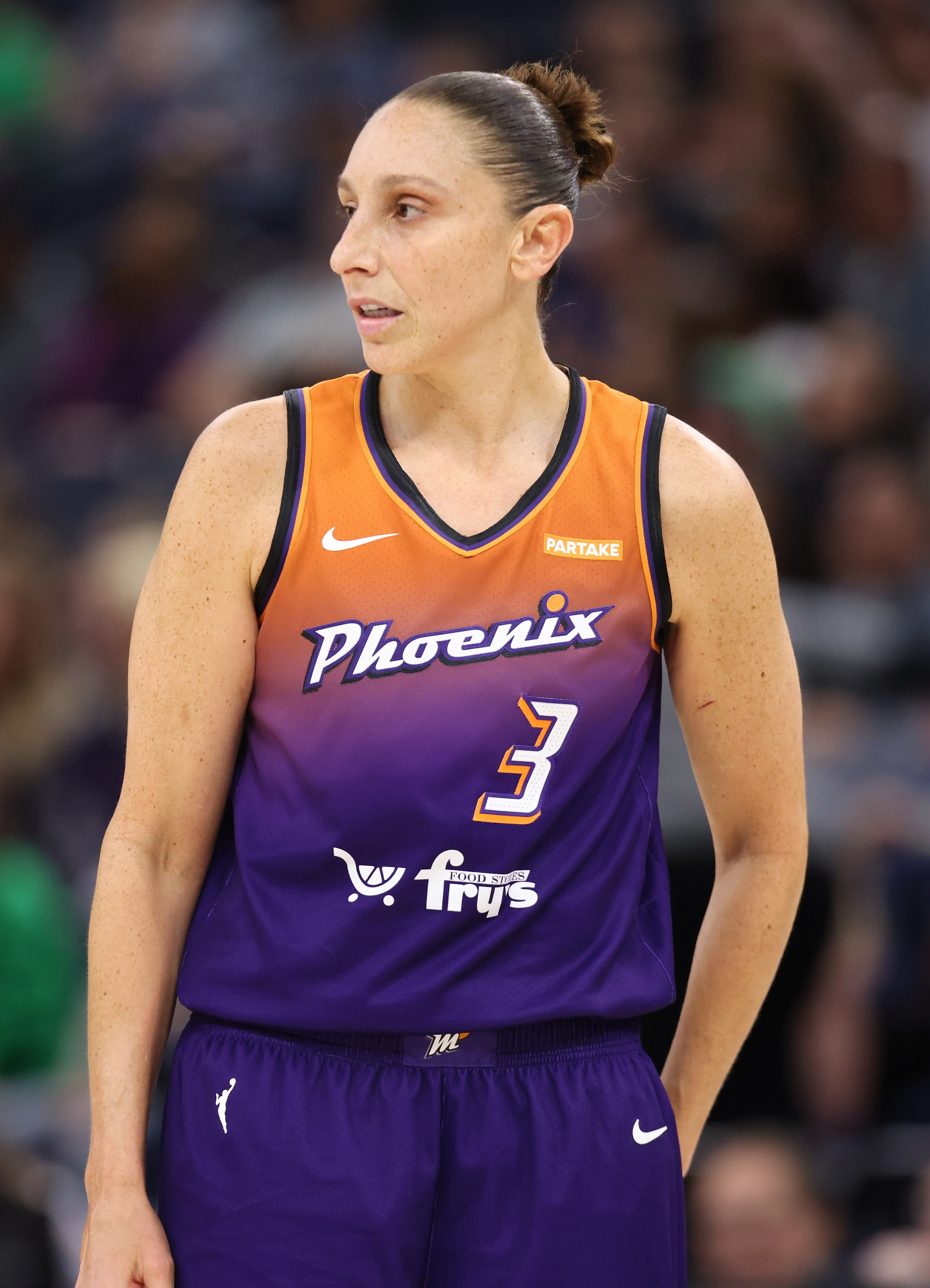
Diana Taurasi has the most turnovers in WNBA history.

^	Active WNBA player
*	Inducted into the Naismith Memorial Basketball Hall of Fame
†	Not yet eligible for Hall of Fame consideration (Note: A player is not eligible for induction into the Naismith Memorial Basketball Hall of Fame until he has been fully retired for two calendar years.)
§	Eligible for Hall of Fame in 2025

Rank	Player	Pos	Team(s) played for (years)	Total turnovers	Games played	Turnovers per game average (Note: Average is rounded to the nearest hundredth and its calculation does not include games played in seasons before turnovers were officially recorded.)
1	Diana Taurasi^{†}	G	Phoenix Mercury (2004–2024) (Note: Taurasi did not play the 2015 season at the request of her Russian Premier League team, UMMC Ekaterinburg.)	1,520	565	2.69
2	Sue Bird*	G	Seattle Storm (2002–2022) (Note: Bird did not play the 2013 season and 2019 season because of knee surgery.)	1,393	580	2.40
3	Becky Hammon*	G	New York Liberty (1999–2006); San Antonio Stars (2007–2014)	1,224	450	2.72
4	Tina Thompson*	F	Houston Comets (1997–2008); Los Angeles Sparks (2009–2011); Seattle Storm (2012–2013)	1,217	496	2.45
5	Courtney Vandersloot^	G	Chicago Sky (2011–2022, 2025–present); New York Liberty (2023–2024)	1,201	463	2.59
6	Lisa Leslie*	C	Los Angeles Sparks (1997–2009) (Note: Leslie did not play the 2007 season due to pregnancy leave.)	1,193	363	3.29
7	DeLisha Milton-Jones	F	Los Angeles Sparks (1999–2004, 2008–2012); Washington Mystics (2005–2007); San Antonio Silver Stars (2013); New York Liberty (2013–2014); Atlanta Dream (2014–2015)	1,173	499	2.35
8	Ticha Penicheiro	G	Sacramento Monarchs (1998–2009); Los Angeles Sparks (2010–2011); Chicago Sky (2012)	1,134	454	2.50
9	Swin Cash*	F	Detroit Shock (2002–2007); Seattle Storm (2008–2011); Chicago Sky (2012–2013); Atlanta Dream (2014); New York Liberty (2014–2016)	1,128	479	2.35
10	Alyssa Thomas^	PF	Connecticut Sun (2014–2024); Phoenix Mercury (2025–present)	1,112	401	2.77
11	Candace Parker*	F	Los Angeles Sparks (2008–2020); Chicago Sky (2021–2022); Las Vegas Aces (2023)	1,062	410	2.59
12	Tamika Catchings*	F	Indiana Fever (2002–2016)	1,043	457	2.28
13	Tina Charles^{†}	C	Connecticut Sun (2010–2013, 2025); New York Liberty (2014–2019); Washington Mystics (2021); Phoenix Mercury (2022); Seattle Storm (2022); Atlanta Dream (2024)	1,039	473	2.20
14	Lindsay Whalen*	G	Connecticut Sun (2004–2009); Minnesota Lynx (2010–2018)	1,006	480	2.10
15	Chelsea Gray^	PG	Connecticut Sun (2015); Los Angeles Sparks (2016–2020); Las Vegas Aces (2021–present)	989	412	2.40
16	Sylvia Fowles*	C	Chicago Sky (2008–2014); Minnesota Lynx (2015–2022)	961	408	2.36
17	Tanisha Wright	G	Seattle Storm (2005–2014); New York Liberty (2015–2016, 2019); Minnesota Lynx (2018)	954	457	2.09
18	Angel McCoughtry	F	Atlanta Dream (2009–2019) (Note: McCoughtry sat out during 2017 to rest.); Las Vegas Aces (2020–2021); Minnesota Lynx (2022)	949	311	3.05
19	Cappie Pondexter	G	Phoenix Mercury (2006–2009); New York Liberty (2010–2014); Chicago Sky (2015–2017); Los Angeles Sparks (2018); Indiana Fever (2018)	948	416	2.28
20	Shannon Johnson	G	Orlando Miracle/Connecticut Sun (1999–2003); San Antonio Silver Stars (2004–2006); Detroit Shock (2007); Houston Comets (2008); Seattle Storm (2009)	940	352	2.67
21	Katie Smith*	G/F	Minnesota Lynx (1999–2005); Detroit Shock (2005–2008); Washington Mystics (2010); Seattle Storm (2011–2012); New York Liberty (2013)	935	482	1.94
22	Skylar Diggins^	PG	Tulsa Shock/Dallas Wings (2013–2019); Phoenix Mercury (2020–2023); Seattle Storm (2024–2025); Chicago Sky (2026–present)	911	354	2.57
23	Taj McWilliams-Franklin	PF/C	Orlando Miracle/Connecticut Sun (1999–2006); Los Angeles Sparks (2007); Washington Mystics (2008); Detroit Shock (2008–2009); New York Liberty (2010); Minnesota Lynx (2011–2012)	900	440	2.05
24	Natasha Howard^	PF	Indiana Fever (2014–2015, 2025); Minnesota Lynx (2016–2017, 2026–present); Seattle Storm (2018–2020); New York Liberty (2021–2022); Dallas Wings (2023–2024)	894	424	2.11
25	Candice Dupree	F	Chicago Sky (2006–2009); Phoenix Mercury (2010–2015); Indiana Fever (2017–2020); Seattle Storm (2021); Atlanta Dream (2021)	872	494	1.77

== Progressive list of turnovers leaders ==
This is a progressive list of turnovers leaders showing how the record increased through the years.

Statistics accurate as of the 2026 season.

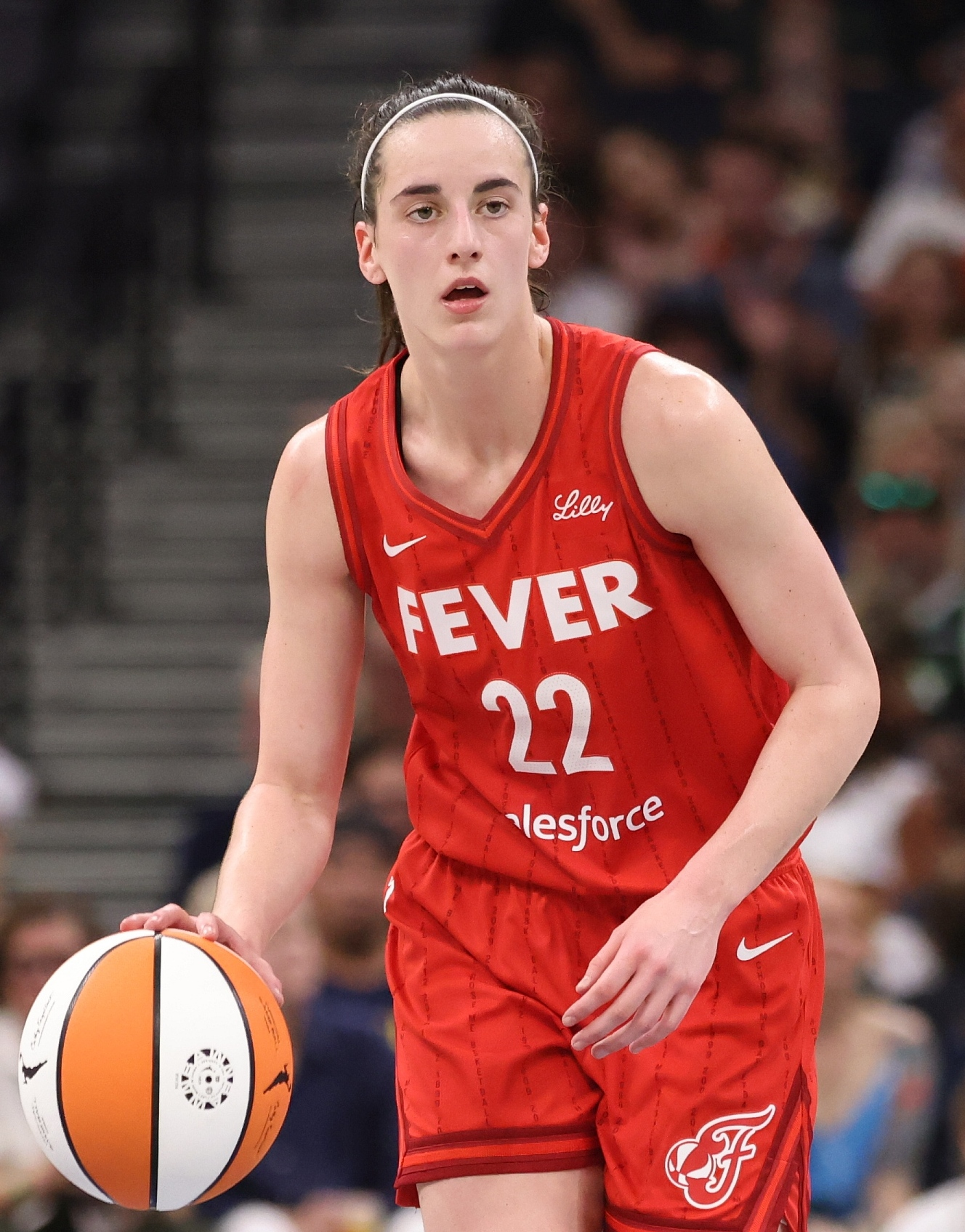
Caitlin Clark has the most turnovers in a single season with 223.

^	Active NBA player
*	Inducted into the Naismith Memorial Basketball Hall of Fame
†	Not yet eligible for Hall of Fame consideration
§	Eligible for Hall of Fame in 2025

Team AbbreviationsTeam listed is the one player was on when he established the record.
ATL	Atlanta Dream	HOU	Houston Comets	PHO	Phoenix Mercury
CHA	Charlotte Sting	IND	Indiana Fever	SAC	Sacramento Monarchs
CHI	Chicago Sky	LAS	Los Angeles Sparks	SAS	San Antonio Silver Stars
CON	Connecticut Sun	MIN	Minnesota Lynx	SEA	Seattle Storm
DET	Detroit Shock	NYL	New York Liberty	WAS	Washington Mystics

WNBA progressive leaders and records for turnovers for every season
Season	Year-by-year leader	TOV	Active player leader	TOV	Career record	TOV	Single-season record	TOV	Season
1997	Chantel TremitiereSAC	122	Chantel TremitiereSAC	122	Chantel TremitiereSAC	122	Chantel TremitiereSAC	122	1997
1998	Nikki McCrayWAS	126	Lisa Leslie*LAS	211	Lisa Leslie*LAS	211	Nikki McCrayWAS	126	1998
1999	Ticha PenicheiroSAC	135	Cynthia Cooper*HOU	308	Cynthia Cooper*HOU	308	Ticha PenicheiroSAC	135	1999
2000	Lisa Leslie*LAS	103	Lisa Leslie*LAS	408	Lisa Leslie*LAS	408	Ticha PenicheiroSAC	135	2000
2001	Dawn Staley*CHA Rita WilliamsIND	100	Lisa Leslie*LAS	506	Lisa Leslie*LAS	506	Ticha PenicheiroSAC	135	2001
2002	Sue Bird*SEA	109	Lisa Leslie*LAS	614	Lisa Leslie*LAS	614	Ticha PenicheiroSAC	135	2002
2003	Sue Bird*SEA	110	Lisa Leslie*LAS	679	Lisa Leslie*LAS	679	Ticha PenicheiroSAC	135	2003
2004	Becky Hammon*NYL	118	Lisa Leslie*LAS	789	Lisa Leslie*LAS	789	Ticha PenicheiroSAC	135	2004
2005	Shannon JohnsonSAS	113	Lisa Leslie*LAS	889	Lisa Leslie*LAS	889	Ticha PenicheiroSAC	135	2005
2006	Lisa Leslie*LAS	126	Lisa Leslie*LAS	1,015	Lisa Leslie*LAS	1,015	Ticha PenicheiroSAC	135	2006
2007	DeLisha Milton-JonesWAS	121	Shannon JohnsonDET	809	Lisa Leslie*LAS	1,015	Ticha PenicheiroSAC	135	2007
2008	Lisa Leslie*LAS	119	Lisa Leslie*LAS	1,134	Lisa Leslie*LAS	1,134	Ticha PenicheiroSAC	135	2008
2009	Becky Hammon*SAS	111	Lisa Leslie*LAS	1,193	Lisa Leslie*LAS	1,193	Ticha PenicheiroSAC	135	2009
2010	Diana Taurasi^{†}PHO	110	Tina Thompson*LAS	1,062	Lisa Leslie*LAS	1,193	Ticha PenicheiroSAC	135	2010
2011	Becky Hammon*SAS	119	Tina Thompson*LAS	1,130	Lisa Leslie*LAS	1,193	Ticha PenicheiroSAC	135	2011
2012	Kristi Toliver^{†}LAS	124	Becky Hammon*SAS	1,168	Lisa Leslie*LAS	1,193	Ticha PenicheiroSAC	135	2012
2013	Angel McCoughtryATL	134	Tina Thompson*SEA	1,217	Tina Thompson*SEA	1,217	Ticha PenicheiroSAC	135	2013
2014	Angel McCoughtryATL	116	Becky Hammon*SAS	1,224	Becky Hammon*SAS	1,224	Ticha PenicheiroSAC	135	2014
2015	Angel McCoughtryATL	107	DeLisha Milton-JonesATL	1,173	Becky Hammon*SAS	1,224	Ticha PenicheiroSAC	135	2015
2016	Candace Parker*LAS	98	Sue Bird*SEA	1,147	Becky Hammon*SAS	1,224	Ticha PenicheiroSAC	135	2016
2017	Alyssa Thomas^CON	98	Sue Bird*SEA	1,209	Becky Hammon*SAS	1,224	Ticha PenicheiroSAC	135	2017
2018	Courtney Vandersloot^CHI	104	Sue Bird*SEA	1,268	Sue Bird*SEA	1,268	Ticha PenicheiroSAC	135	2018
2019	Odyssey Sims^MIN	112	Diana Taurasi^{†}PHO	1,199	Sue Bird*SEA	1,268	Ticha PenicheiroSAC	135	2019
2020	Skylar Diggins-Smith^PHO	70	Sue Bird*SEA	1,286	Sue Bird*SEA	1,286	Ticha PenicheiroSAC	135	2020
2021	Betnijah Laney^NYL	119	Sue Bird*SEA	1,333	Sue Bird*SEA	1,333	Ticha PenicheiroSAC	135	2021
2022	Natasha Howard^NYL	113	Sue Bird*SEA	1,393	Sue Bird*SEA	1,393	Ticha PenicheiroSAC	135	2022
2023	Alyssa Thomas^CON	137	Diana Taurasi^{†}PHO	1,452	Diana Taurasi^{†}PHO	1,452	Alyssa Thomas^CON	137	2023
2024	Caitlin Clark^IND	223	Diana Taurasi^{†}PHO	1,520	Diana Taurasi^{†}PHO	1,520	Caitlin Clark^IND	223	2024
2025	Alyssa Thomas^PHO	135	Courtney Vandersloot^NYL	1,145	Diana Taurasi^{†}PHO	1,520	Caitlin Clark^IND	223	2025
2026	Caitlin Clark^IND	183	Courtney Vandersloot^NYL	1,201	Diana Taurasi^{†}PHO	1,520	Caitlin Clark^IND	223	2026
Season	Year-by-year leader	TOV	Active player leader	TOV	Career record	TOV	Single-season record	TOV	Season
