= Catherine Joens =

American basketball player (born 1981)

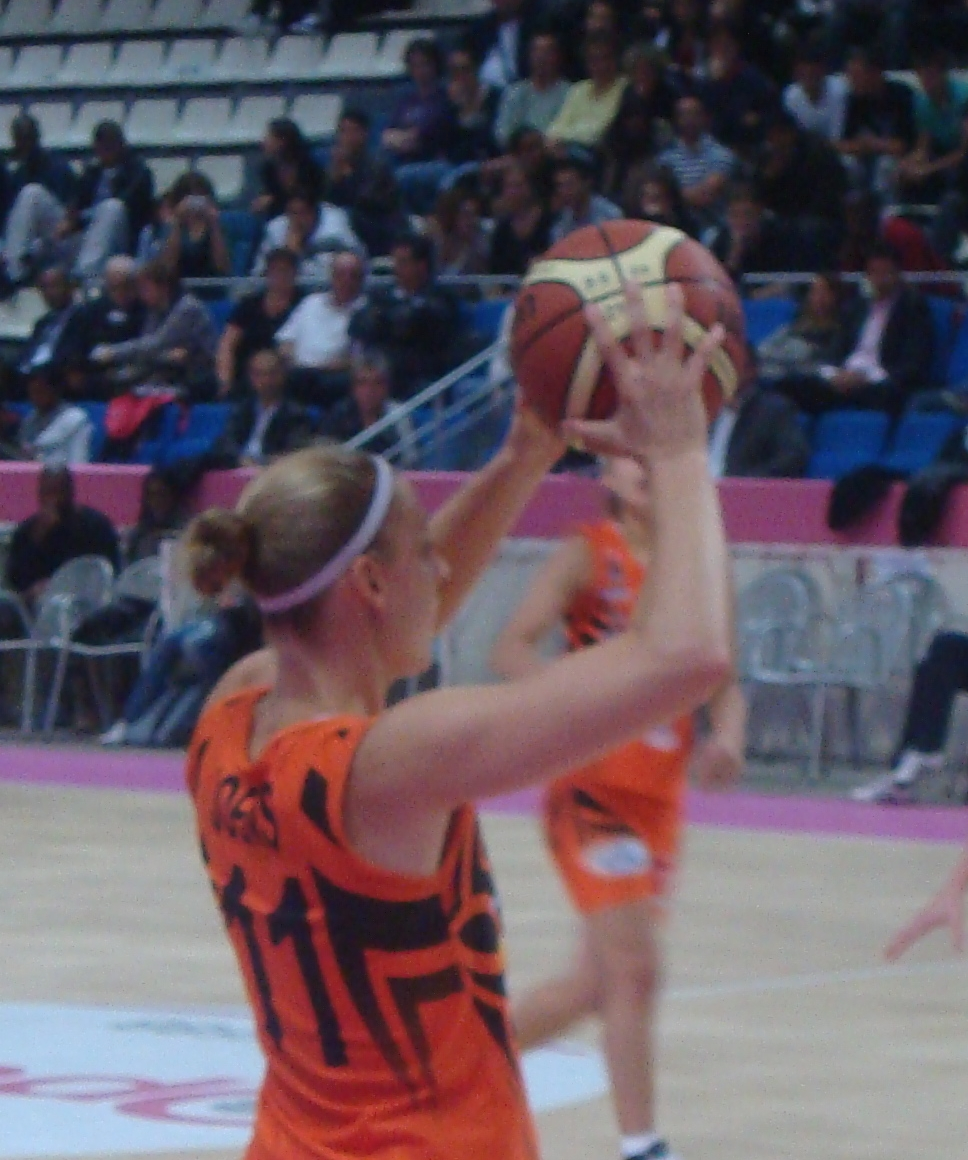
- Joens playing with CJM Bourges in 2010

Personal information
- Born: February 12, 1981 (age 45) Irvine, California, U.S.
- Listed height: 5 ft 11 in (1.80 m)

Career information
- High school: Calvary Chapel (Irvine, California)
- College: George Washington (1999–2004)
- WNBA draft: 2004: 3rd round, 30th overall pick
- Drafted by: New York Liberty
- Position: Small forward

Career history
- 2005–2007: Pays d'Aix Basket 13
- 2007–2008: Chicago Sky
- 2007–2008: Baloncesto Rivas
- 2008–2010: Baloncesto Rivas
- 2010–2014: CJM Bourges Basket

Career highlights
- 2× A-10 Player of the Year (2003, 2004); 3× First-team All A-10 (2002–2004)
- Stats at Basketball Reference

Catherine Elizabeth Joens (born February 12, 1981) is an American former professional basketball player. She attended George Washington University and after graduating, played basketball professionally in France, Spain, and America. Joens is an advocate for balancing nutrition, a healthy lifestyle and basketball, and has had numerous speaking engagements and basketball camps promoting these three things.

== Early life ==
Cathy Joens is the second oldest of eight children. She attended Woodbridge High School, but as a junior, transferred to Calvary Chapel High School. Joens also played AAU basketball for California Academy. Entering high school, Joens was a two sport athlete, playing both soccer and basketball, but she eventually focused on just basketball. Over her high school career, Joens scored over 1,600 points, and in 1999, was named the Division IV Girls Basketball Player of the Year in the state of California.

== College career ==
During her freshman season at George Washington University, Joens averaged 7.0 points in 16.4 minutes per game. She was named to the all-tournament team for the SMU Hoops For The Cure Thanksgiving tournament. Due to an ACL tear, Joens had to sit out her entire sophomore season. As a junior, Joens averaged 15.3 points per game and was named First team All-Atlantic 10. Joens also made the all-tournament teams for the Gene Hackerman Rice Invitational and Pepperdine Holiday Classic. Joens received many accolades her senior season, averaging 17.2 points per game while shooting 43.3 percent from three-point land (setting a school record with 94 made in a single season). Because of her outstanding season, Joens was named first team All-A10 once again and was the Atlantic 10 Player of the Year. As a graduate student during the 2003–2004 season, Joens averaged 19.4 points per game and 6.1 rebounds per game.

Joens is third place on the all-time leading scorer's list with 1,802 points. She is also 18th in assists with 314, 14th in games played with 124, and 17th in rebounds with 569. She is the all-time leader in three-point field goals made with 291 and in 2004, won the Edward S. Steitz Award (named in honor of Ed Steitz) as the country's best three-point shooter in college. In the same year, Joens competed in ESPN's college three-point shooting contest. Her senior season, Joens was mentioned in the Academic All-America team where she made the second team for district two. Due to her academic success and passion to continue her education, Joens was one of four players that were awarded a postgraduate scholarship by the Atlantic 10. Joens finished college with an undergraduate grade point average of 3.28.

George Washington coach Joe McKeown said about Joens, "She's well past the point of me coaching her so she just plays. She's not somebody you want to put a lot of restrictions on; you want to let her go. We've given her the green light and every other light you can think of. There's not a bad shot for her to take." GW made NCAA postseason play every year Joens was there, and in 2003, won the Atlantic 10 Championship. Joens was part of the class of 2014 inducted into the GW Athletics Hall of Fame. Notably, current Notre Dame men's basketball coach Mike Brey was part of the same class.

Some notable games from her college career include scoring a career-high 35 points against Fordham on January 15, 2003, and in the same game, making seven three-pointers and 10 free-throws. Joens grabbed a career-high 10 rebounds against George Mason on December 20, 2002, and a little earlier in the same season, on December 1, had eight steals against VCU.

=== George Washington statistics ===
Legend
GP	Games played	GS	Games started	MPG	Minutes per game
FG%	Field goal percentage	3P%	3-point field goal percentage	FT%	Free throw percentage
RPG	Rebounds per game	APG	Assists per game	SPG	Steals per game
BPG	Blocks per game	PPG	Points per game	**Bold**	Career high

Year	Team	GP	Points	FG%	3P%	FT%	RPG	APG	SPG	BPG	PPG
1999-00	George Washington	31	211	38.0%	30.5%	73.5%	3.6	0.9	1.0	–	6.8
2000–01	Medical redshirt										
2001–02	George Washington	30	459	42.5%	41.1%	77.4%	3.9	2.9	1.7	**0.1**	15.3
2002–03	George Washington	**32**	551	**45.2%**	43.3%	75.0%	4.9	3.2	2.1	0.0	17.2
2003–04	George Washington	30	**581**	44.8%	**44.0%**	**80.2%**	**6.1**	**3.2**	**2.2**	0.0	**19.4**
Career		123	1802	43.4%	11.1%	77.1%	13.5	2.6	1.7	0.0	14.7

== Professional career ==
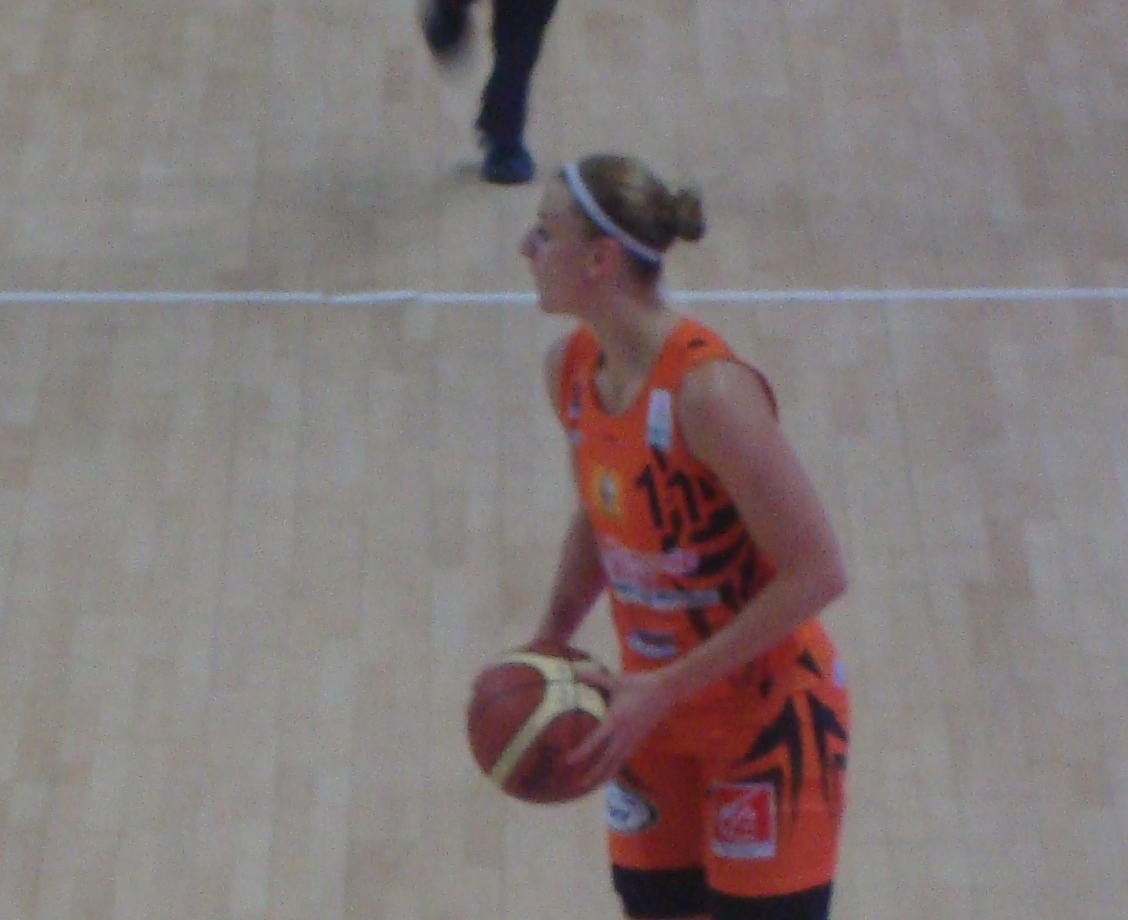

Joens was taken 30th overall by the New York Liberty in the 2004 WNBA draft alongside fellow Colonial Ugo Oha who was taken 24th in the same draft by the Connecticut Sun. However, Joens was waived on May 19 as part of the final cuts shortly before the season began. She never played a game for the Liberty before moving on to play professional basketball overseas. Following her dominant stint with Pays d'Aix Basket 13 in France (Ligue Féminine de Basketball) where she ended up being the league's top scorer, on May 8, 2007, Joens signed with the Chicago Sky in the WNBA. She was waived shortly thereafter on May 24, but then signed with them again on July 5. In her first season in the WNBA, Joens averaged 5.0 points a game in 14.3 minutes a game. In 2008, with the Sky, Joens averaged 3.8 points per game in 10.5 minutes per game.

After the 2008 WNBA season, Joens signed with Baloncesto Rivas and played well, but was plagued by injuries during her time in Spain. In 2010, Joens signed with CJM Bourges Basket and asserted herself as one of the pillars of the club. In the same season, Joens was selected to the EuroLeague Women All Star game where she scored 10 points. Her third season with Borges was cut short due to an injury, but before the fracture, she was one of the best scorers for "Les Tangos," averaging 12.3 points and 3.5 rebounds in LFB and 13.7 points and 3.2 rebounds in the EuroLeague. Because of her injury, she was replaced by fellow WNBA player Marissa Coleman. During her career, Joens wore the number 11. She has not played professionally since 2014 with CJM Bourges Basket.

== Personal life ==
Joens has had numerous speaking engagements all around the globe, educating the youth about healthy living, and balancing basketball with a healthy lifestyle. She got her Bachelor of Science in Exercise Science from George Washington in 2004, Master of Public Health in Health Promotion/Disease Prevention from GWU in 2009, and Bachelor of Science in Dietetics from the University of Northern Colorado in 2013. Joens speaks Spanish and is married to her husband, Patrick.

== WNBA career statistics ==
Legend
GP	Games played	GS	Games started	MPG	Minutes per game	RPG	Rebounds per game
APG	Assists per game	SPG	Steals per game	BPG	Blocks per game	PPG	Points per game
TO	Turnovers per game	FG%	Field-goal percentage	3P%	3-point field-goal percentage	FT%	Free-throw percentage
**Bold**	Career best	°	League leader

=== Regular season ===
Year	Team	GP	GS	MPG	FG%	3P%	FT%	RPG	APG	SPG	BPG	TO	PPG
2007	Chicago	19	0	**14.3**	**39.2**	**48.9**	84.6	**1.7**	**1.7**	**0.9**	0.1	**0.7**	**5.0**
2008	Chicago	**26**	0	10.5	37.4	36.9	**87.5**	1.3	0.5	0.2	0.1	0.9	3.8
Career	2 years, 1 team	45	0	12.1	38.2	41.8	85.7	1.5	1.0	0.5	0.1	0.8	4.3

== Awards ==
- WNBA 3-point field goal percentage leader: (2007)
- 2010 EuroLeague Women All Star
- AP All-American Honorable Mention
- Lynn George Outstanding Senior Female Student Athlete Award
- 2004 Steitz Award winner
- Second team Academic All-America Team, District Two (2003)
- Atlantic 10 All-Conference First Team (2002–2003)
- Atlantic 10 Player of the Year (2002–2003)
- Atlantic 10 All-Conference First Team (2001–2002)
