= Claire Coggins =

American basketball player (born 1985)

Personal information
- Born: May 19, 1985 (age 41) Lee's Summit, Missouri, U.S.
- Listed height: 5 ft 11 in (1.80 m)

Career information
- High school: Lee's Summit North High School (Lee's Summit, Missouri)
- College: Kansas State (2003–2007)
- WNBA draft: 2007: undrafted
- Playing career: 2007–2008
- Position: Guard
- Number: 14
- Coaching career: 2007–2008

Career history

Playing
- 2007: Chicago Sky
- 2008: Panathanaikos

Coaching
- 2008-2010: Connors State College (assistant)
- 2010-2011: Oklahoma City University (assistant)
- 2014-2015: Kansas State (assistant)

Career highlights
- 2x All-Big 12 Second Team (2006, 2007)
- Stats at Basketball Reference

Claire Coggins (born May 19, 1985) is an American former professional basketball player and coach who played one season in the WNBA for the Chicago Sky. She played college basketball at Kansas State where she was award Big 12 Conference honors. She also spent 3 years coaching as an assistant for Connors State College, Oklahoma City University, and Kansas State.

== College career ==
Coggins played her colligate career at Kansas State. She earned two all-Big 12 selections and ended her career with 1,236 points, the 32nd Wildcat to pass the 1,000-point mark. Coggins was a member of the 2004 Big 12 Championship team, as well as the MVP of the 2006 Women's National Invitation Tournament.

== Professional career ==
Coggins went undrafted during the 2007 WNBA draft.

=== Chicago Sky ===
Though she was undrafted, Coggins signed a training camp contract with the Chicago Sky in 2007. She went through training camp and made the team for the 2007 season. Coggins appeared in 20 games during her rookie year, and scored a career-high 10 points on June 7, 2007 against the Phoenix Mercury.

=== Panathinaikos ===
Following her season with Chicago, Coggins signed to play in Athens for Panathinaikos for the 2008 season.

== Career statistics ==
Legend
GP	Games played	GS	Games started	MPG	Minutes per game	RPG	Rebounds per game
APG	Assists per game	SPG	Steals per game	BPG	Blocks per game	PPG	Points per game
TO	Turnovers per game	FG%	Field-goal percentage	3P%	3-point field-goal percentage	FT%	Free-throw percentage
**Bold**	Career best	°	League leader

=== Regular season ===
Year	Team	GP	GS	MPG	FG%	3P%	FT%	RPG	APG	SPG	BPG	TO	PPG
2007	Chicago	20	1	9.8	.247	.200	.250	0.8	0.4	0.3	0.1	1.0	2.5
Career	1 year, 1 team	20	1	9.8	.247	.200	.250	0.8	0.4	0.3	0.1	1.0	2.5

=== College ===
Year	Team	GP	GS	MPG	FG%	3P%	FT%	RPG	APG	SPG	BPG	TO	PPG
2003–04	Kansas State	25	-	12.2	34.5	30.4	58.3	1.5	0.8	1.3	0.1	**0.9**	3.2
2004–05	Kansas State	32	-	23.6	**41.5**	36.2	**74.4**	3.1	**2.2**	1.3	**0.4**	1.6	9.5
2005–06	Kansas State	33	-	30.0	38.9	**38.9**	64.9	3.1	2.1	1.4	**0.4**	1.7	**13.5**
2006–07	Kansas State	**34**	-	**32.5**	34.6	29.8	46.3	**3.4**	1.6	**1.9**	0.2	2.8	11.9
**Career**		124	-	25.4	37.6	34.5	60.8	2.8	1.7	1.5	0.3	1.8	10.0
Statistics retrieved from Sports-Reference.

== Coaching career ==
After playing in Athens, Coggins began a coaching career at the colligate level. She started off at Connors State College, where she spent two years as an assistant. After that Coggins moved over to Oklahoma City University, where she spent one year.

Coggins returned to her alma mater in 2012 when she became the Wildcats Video Coordinator. She was promoted to the Director of Team Operations the following year, and then promoted again to Assistant Coach for the 2014-2015 season. After the season, Coggins resigned from her Assistant Coach position.

== Personal life ==
Coggins is married to current UTSA Roadrunners women's basketball head coach Karen Aston. The two have a daughter together.
