= Tyresa Smith =

American basketball player (born 1985)

Personal information
- Born: April 21, 1985 (age 41)
- Listed height: 5 ft 9 in (1.75 m)
- Listed weight: 72 kg (159 lb)

Career information
- High school: Polytech (Woodside, Delaware)
- College: Delaware (2003–2007)
- WNBA draft: 2007: 2nd round, 18th overall pick
- Drafted by: Phoenix Mercury
- Playing career: 2007–2011

Career history
- 2007: Detroit Shock
- 2010–2011: Inexio Royals Saarlouis

Career highlights
- 2× First-team All-CAA (2006, 2007); 2× CAA Defensive Player of the Year (2006, 2007); 3× CAA All-Defensive Team (2005–2007)
- Stats at Basketball Reference

Tyresa Smith (born April 21, 1985) was the 18th overall pick in the 2007 WNBA draft and was selected in the second round by the Phoenix Mercury. Smith was selected from the University of Delaware where she was the team's second all-time leading scorer and became the first player from UD to be drafted in the WNBA draft. In 2007, she was named the Colonial Athletic Association's Defensive Player Of The Year, led the CAA in scoring, and was named First Team All-CAA after averaging 19.8 points, 7.5 rebounds, and 2.6 steals per game. She was also the CAA Defensive Player of the Year in 2006. On August 19, 2007 she was signed by the Detroit Shock. After her career with Detroit, she played in Germany, Russia and Greece.

Smith grew up in Dover, Delaware and played high school basketball for Polytech High School. She led the team to a state championship in 2003 as a senior and was named the state of Delaware's female basketball player of the year. She shared a Delaware Sportswriters and Broadcasters Association award with Carrie Lingo, with them both being recognized as Delaware's Outstanding Athlete of 2007. She was inducted into the Delaware Sports Hall of Fame as part of its 2020/2021 class.

Today she teaches health and physical education at Ludlow-Taylor Elementary School, Washington, D.C.

== Career statistics ==
Legend
GP	Games played	GS	Games started	MPG	Minutes per game	RPG	Rebounds per game
APG	Assists per game	SPG	Steals per game	BPG	Blocks per game	PPG	Points per game
TO	Turnovers per game	FG%	Field-goal percentage	3P%	3-point field-goal percentage	FT%	Free-throw percentage
**Bold**	Career best	°	League leader

=== WNBA ===
==== Regular season ====
Year	Team	GP	GS	MPG	FG%	3P%	FT%	RPG	APG	SPG	BPG	TO	PPG
2007	Detroit	1	0	7.0	0.0	0.0	50.0	2.0	0.0	1.0	0.0	0.0	1.0
Career	1 year, 1 team	1	0	7.0	0.0	0.0	50.0	2.0	0.0	1.0	0.0	0.0	1.0

==== Playoffs ====
Year	Team	GP	GS	MPG	FG%	3P%	FT%	RPG	APG	SPG	BPG	TO	PPG
2007	Detroit	1	0	0.0	0.0	0.0	0.0	0.0	0.0	0.0	0.0	0.0	0.0
Career	1 year, 1 team	1	0	0.0	0.0	0.0	0.0	0.0	0.0	0.0	0.0	0.0	0.0

=== College ===
Legend
GP	Games played	GS	Games started	MPG	Minutes per game
FG%	Field goal percentage	3P%	3-point field goal percentage	FT%	Free throw percentage
RPG	Rebounds per game	APG	Assists per game	SPG	Steals per game
BPG	Blocks per game	PPG	Points per game	**Bold**	Career high

Year	Team	GP	Points	FG%	3P%	FT%	RPG	APG	SPG	BPG	PPG
2003–04	Delaware	29	227	42.8	–	53.9	3.7	2.0	2.6	0.7	7.8
2004–05	Delaware	31	318	37.5	–	63.4	4.9	**3.2**	**3.2**	0.4	10.3
2005–06	Delaware	30	458	42.6	–	68.5	6.4	2.5	2.8	0.7	15.3
2006–07	Delaware	**32**	**632**	**44.1**	–	**73.2**	**7.5**	2.3	2.6	0.6	**19.8**
Career	Delaware	122	1635	42.2	0.0	66.8	5.7	2.5	2.8	0.6	13.4
