= Carla Thomas (basketball) =

American basketball player (born 1985)

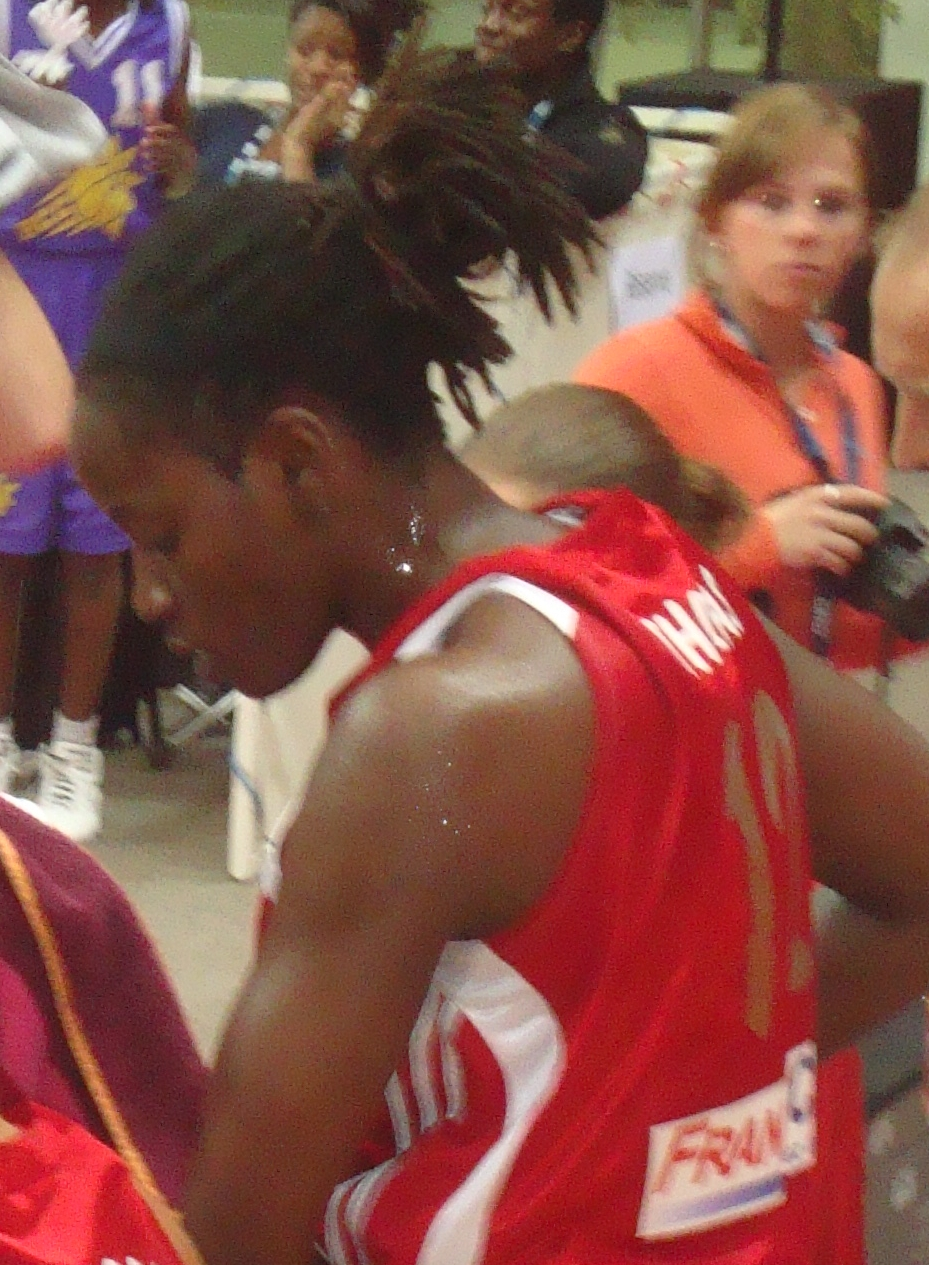
- Thomas in 2010

Personal information
- Born: October 31, 1985 (age 41)
- Listed height: 6 ft 3 in (1.91 m)

Career information
- High school: Cumberland Valley (Mechanicsburg, Pennsylvania)
- College: Vanderbilt (2003–2007)
- WNBA draft: 2007: 1st round, 10th overall pick
- Drafted by: Chicago Sky
- Position: Power forward / center

Career history
- 2007: Chicago Sky

Career highlights
- First-team All-SEC (2007); 2× SEC Tournament MVP (2004); SEC All-Freshman Team (2004)
- Stats at Basketball Reference

Carla Thomas (born October 31, 1985) is an American basketball player for the Chicago Sky of the WNBA. She played a total of 17 games for the Sky in the 2007 season, averaging 2.5 points per game.

In 2015, she was inducted into the Pennsylvania Sports Hall of Fame.

In 2019, Thomas was inducted into the Vanderbilt University Athletics Hall of Fame, where she played for four years. A graduate of Cumberland Valley High School in Mechanicsburg, Pennsylvania, Thomas is one of the first women's basketball players to be drafted into the WNBA from the state of Pennsylvania.

Over the course of her athletic career she has won numerous individual and team accolades at the high school, collegiate, and professional levels.

== Career statistics ==
=== WNBA career statistics ===
Legend
GP	Games played	GS	Games started	MPG	Minutes per game	RPG	Rebounds per game
APG	Assists per game	SPG	Steals per game	BPG	Blocks per game	PPG	Points per game
TO	Turnovers per game	FG%	Field-goal percentage	3P%	3-point field-goal percentage	FT%	Free-throw percentage
**Bold**	Career best	°	League leader

==== Regular season ====
Year	Team	GP	GS	MPG	FG%	3P%	FT%	RPG	APG	SPG	BPG	TO	PPG
2007	Chicago	17	0	7.2	39.5	0.0	92.9	1.6	0.2	0.1	0.2	0.4	2.5
Career	1 year, 1 team	17	0	7.2	39.5	0.0	92.9	1.6	0.2	0.1	0.2	0.4	2.5

=== College career statistics ===
Legend
GP	Games played	GS	Games started	MPG	Minutes per game
FG%	Field goal percentage	3P%	3-point field goal percentage	FT%	Free throw percentage
RPG	Rebounds per game	APG	Assists per game	SPG	Steals per game
BPG	Blocks per game	PPG	Points per game	**Bold**	Career high

Year	Team	GP	Points	FG%	3P%	FT%	RPG	APG	SPG	BPG	PPG
2003-04	Vanderbilt	**34**	341	55.2	-	77.4	5.1	0.8	0.9	1.3	10.0
2004-05	Vanderbilt	32	509	54.1	-	80.2	**6.5**	1.6	1.1	**1.4**	15.9
2005-06	Vanderbilt	30	373	52.6	-	**83.5**	5.9	1.9	1.1	0.7	12.4
2006-07	Vanderbilt	**34**	**551**	**55.0**	**25.0**	80.5	6.4	**2.3**	**1.2**	1.0	**16.2**
Career	Vanderbilt	130	1774	54.3	25.0	80.5	6.0	1.6	1.1	1.1	13.6
