= Bernice Mosby =

American basketball player (born 1984)

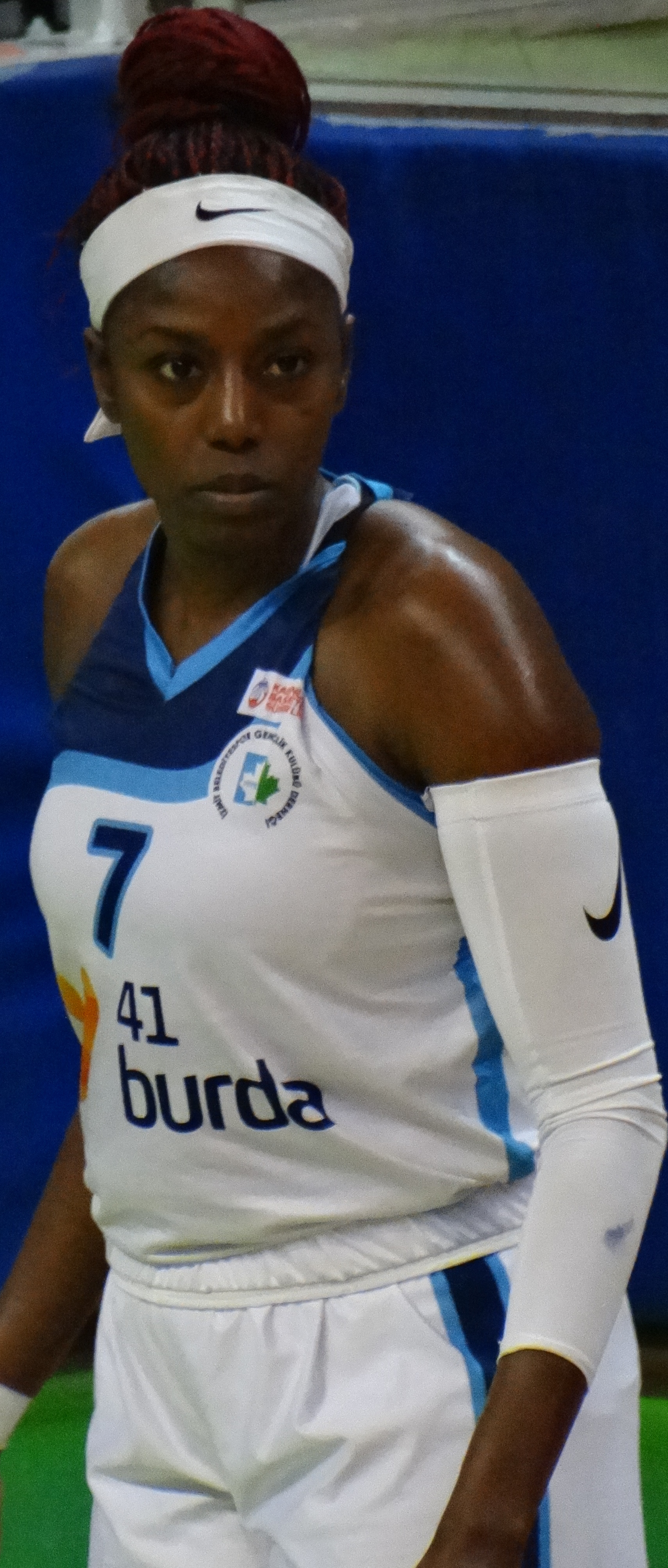

KEB Hana Bank
- Position: Forward

Personal information
- Born: February 14, 1984 (age 42) Avon Park, Florida, U.S.
- Listed height: 6 ft 1 in (1.85 m)
- Listed weight: 140 lb (64 kg)

Career information
- High school: Hernando (Brooksville, Florida)
- College: Florida (2002–2005); Baylor (2006–2007)
- WNBA draft: 2007: 1st round, 6th overall pick
- Drafted by: Washington Mystics

Career history
- 2007–2009: Washington Mystics

Career highlights
- First-team All-Big 12 (2007); SEC Sixth Player of the Year (2004); SEC All-Freshman Team (2003)
- Stats at WNBA.com
- Stats at Basketball Reference

Bernice Tyrone Mosby (born February 14, 1984) is an American professional basketball player who played with the Washington Mystics in the WNBA from 2007 to 2009. Currently playing for KEB Hana Bank in the Korean Women's League.

== Career statistics ==
=== WNBA ===
Legend
GP	Games played	GS	Games started	MPG	Minutes per game	RPG	Rebounds per game
APG	Assists per game	SPG	Steals per game	BPG	Blocks per game	PPG	Points per game
TO	Turnovers per game	FG%	Field-goal percentage	3P%	3-point field-goal percentage	FT%	Free-throw percentage
**Bold**	Career best	°	League leader

==== Regular season ====
Year	Team	GP	GS	MPG	FG%	3P%	FT%	RPG	APG	SPG	BPG	TO	PPG
2007	Washington	**28**	0	**10.0**	**48.4**	0.0	82.1	**2.8**	**0.4**	**0.3**	0.2	0.7	**3.0**
2008	Washington	24	**1**	7.6	39.2	0.0	66.7	2.2	0.1	0.1	**0.3**	**0.5**	2.0
2009	Washington	24	0	7.0	36.2	0.0	**85.7**	1.5	0.1	**0.3**	0.0	0.7	1.9
Career	3 years, 1 team	76	1	8.3	41.9	0.0	79.6	2.2	0.2	0.2	0.2	0.6	2.3

=== College ===
Legend
GP	Games played	GS	Games started	MPG	Minutes per game
FG%	Field goal percentage	3P%	3-point field goal percentage	FT%	Free throw percentage
RPG	Rebounds per game	APG	Assists per game	SPG	Steals per game
BPG	Blocks per game	PPG	Points per game	**Bold**	Career high

Year	Team	GP	Points	FG%	3P%	FT%	RPG	APG	SPG	BPG	PPG
2002–03	Florida	28	334	41.8	22.6	57.3	7.5	0.7	1.0	0.6	11.9
2003–04	Florida	30	402	44.2	**40.3**	68.7	6.7	1.1	1.0	0.2	13.4
2004–05	Florida	25	388	41.0	28.0	71.2	8.6	1.3	1.3	0.8	15.5
2005–06	Baylor	Sat due to NCAA transfer rules									
2006–07	Baylor	**34**	**598**	**46.3**	34.8	**78.8**	**9.1**	**1.9**	**1.4**	**1.5**	**17.6**
Career	Combined	117	1722	43.6	33.6	70.6	8.0	1.3	1.2	0.8	14.7
