= Dominique Canty =

American basketball player (born 1977)

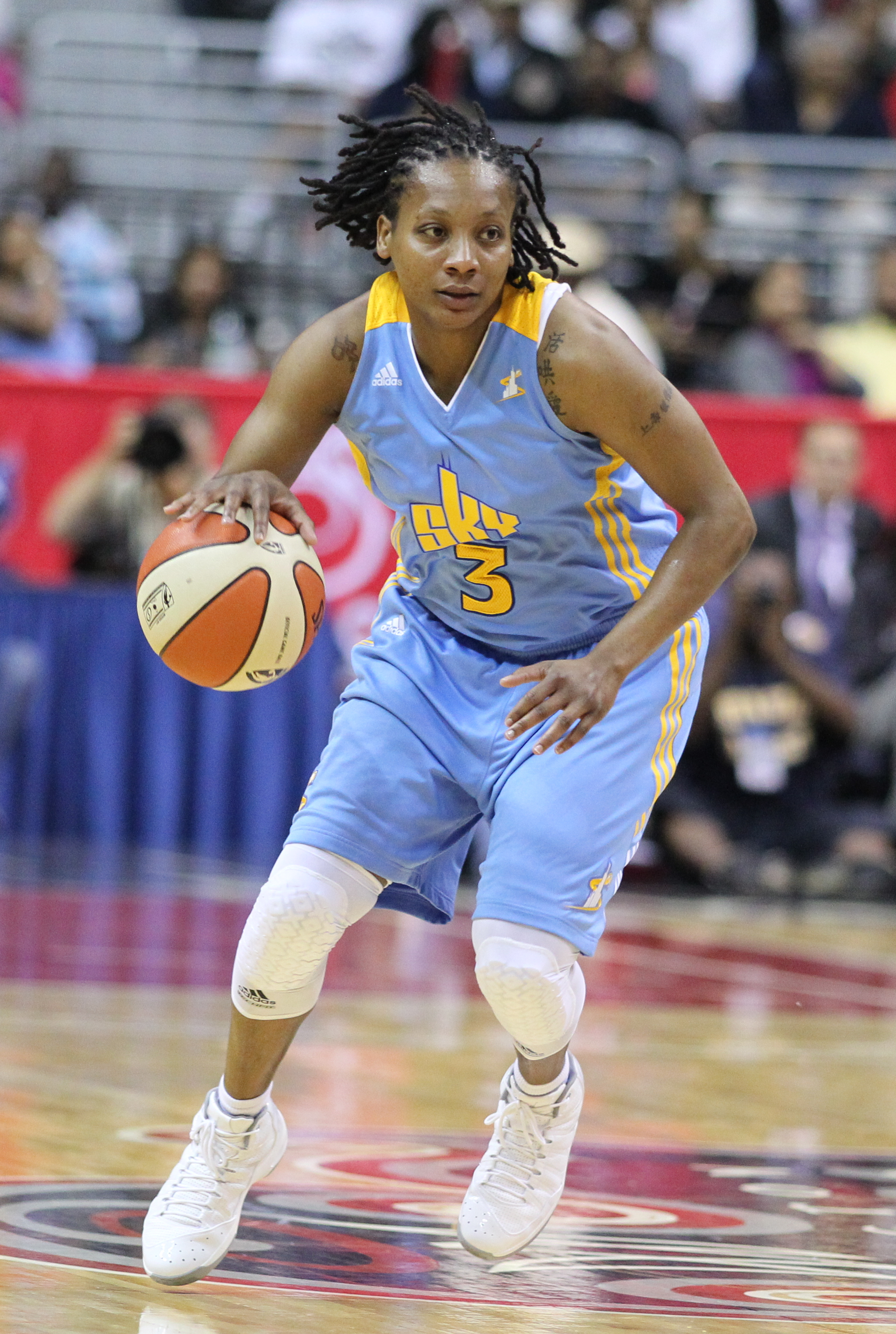

Personal information
- Born: March 2, 1977 (age 49) Chicago, Illinois, U.S.
- Listed height: 5 ft 9 in (1.75 m)
- Listed weight: 166 lb (75 kg)

Career information
- High school: Whitney Young (Chicago, Illinois)
- College: Alabama (1995–1999)
- WNBA draft: 1999: 3rd round, 29th overall pick
- Drafted by: Detroit Shock
- Playing career: 1999–2012
- Position: Guard
- Number: 3

Career history
- 1999–2002: Detroit Shock
- 2003–2006: Houston Comets
- 2007–2011: Chicago Sky
- 2012: Washington Mystics

Career highlights
- WBCA Coaches' All-American (1998, 1999); 2x All-American – USBWA (1998, 1999); First-team All-American – AP (1999); Second-team All-American – AP (1998); 3x First-team All-SEC (1997–1999); SEC Tournament MVP (1996); SEC All-Freshman Team (1996)
- Stats at WNBA.com
- Stats at Basketball Reference

Dominique Danyell Canty (born March 2, 1977) is an American professional women's basketball player, most recently with the Washington Mystics in the WNBA.

== High School and College ==
Born in Chicago, Illinois, Canty attended Whitney Young High School, where she was named a High School All-American by the WBCA. She participated in the WBCA High School All-America Game in 1995, scoring seventeen points.

After graduating from High School, where she was a 1995 Street & Smith All-American and a four-time All-State player, Canty attended the University of Alabama and majored in criminal justice with a minor in social work while spending four seasons with Alabama Crimson Tide women's basketball.

In her senior year, she was named First-Team All-American by the Associated Press and The Sporting News.

She finished her collegiate career as a two-time All-American and four-time All-SEC selection, and averaged 18.1 points, 7.2 rebounds and 3.6 assists during her four seasons with the Alabama Crimson Tide.

By the time she graduated, Canty finished her career as the school's all-time leading scorer—male or female.

=== Team statistics ===
Legend
GP	Games played	GS	Games started	MPG	Minutes per game
FG%	Field goal percentage	3P%	3-point field goal percentage	FT%	Free throw percentage
RPG	Rebounds per game	APG	Assists per game	SPG	Steals per game
BPG	Blocks per game	PPG	Points per game	**Bold**	Career high

Year	Team	GP	Points	FG%	3P%	FT%	RPG	APG	SPG	BPG	PPG
1995-96	Alabama	31	452	53.0%	0.0%	66.2%	6.8	2.4	1.8	**0.5**	14.6
1996-97	Alabama	31	498	51.3%	0.0%	66.1%	7.3	2.9	1.7	0.4	16.1
1997-98	Alabama	**34**	**732**	**51.8%**	20.8%	75.2%	7.1	**4.8**	1.3	0.5	**21.5**
1998-99	Alabama	31	612	47.9%	**31.3%**	**76.7%**	**7.5**	4.2	**2.3**	0.3	19.7
Career		127	2294	50.9%	19.2%	71.8%	7.2	3.6	1.7	0.4	18.1

== WNBA career ==
Canty was drafted 29th overall in the 3rd round during the 1999 WNBA draft by the Detroit Shock. She was the runner-up in the 1999 WNBA Rookie of the Year voting.

After playing four seasons with the Shock, she was traded to the Houston Comets on April 28, 2003 in exchange for the draft rights to Allison Curtin (Houston's 2003 first-round draft choice).

Like most WNBA players during the off-season, Canty kept active in basketball at various levels. When she was with the Detroit Shock, she served the 1999–2000 off-season in their public relations department as an intern. A year later, she worked as an intern in the public relations department of the Dallas Mavericks NBA team.

After the 2001 WNBA season ended, she served as an assistant coach for the Chicago State University women's basketball team.

On February 12, 2007, the Chicago Sky signed her as a free agent.

=== WNBA career statistics ===
Legend
GP	Games played	GS	Games started	MPG	Minutes per game	RPG	Rebounds per game
APG	Assists per game	SPG	Steals per game	BPG	Blocks per game	PPG	Points per game
TO	Turnovers per game	FG%	Field-goal percentage	3P%	3-point field-goal percentage	FT%	Free-throw percentage
**Bold**	Career best	°	League leader

==== Regular season ====
Year	Team	GP	GS	MPG	FG%	3P%	FT%	RPG	APG	SPG	BPG	TO	PPG
1999	Detroit	26	11	24.8	33.2	17.6	69.1	3.1	1.5	1.0	0.0	1.7	9.6
2000	Detroit	28	27	28.0	40.9	0.0	69.5	2.5	2.9	**1.8**	**0.2**	1.8	9.2
2001	Detroit	32	18	19.5	36.3	0.0	**75.7**	2.6	2.2	1.0	0.0	1.7	6.2
2002	Detroit	28	12	22.3	33.8	0.0	72.4	2.5	3.0	0.8	0.1	2.0	5.7
2003	Houston	32	4	20.3	37.9	0.0	66.7	3.1	1.8	0.7	0.0	1.5	5.4
2004	Houston	32	12	24.1	42.0	0.0	70.8	2.6	2.0	1.0	0.0	1.4	5.5
2005	Houston	33	32	**30.2**	39.9	0.0	72.7	3.3	3.1	0.9	0.1	2.0	8.2
2006	Houston	15	15	28.7	**51.4**	0.0	72.7	**3.5**	2.9	1.1	0.0	2.3	**10.9**
2007	Chicago	30	27	25.9	36.1	25.0	70.4	2.1	**4.1**	1.0	0.1	1.9	8.6
2008	Chicago	28	28	26.3	39.4	16.7	66.9	2.5	**4.1**	1.0	0.1	1.9	8.1
2009	Chicago	**34**	**34**	22.8	38.1	**36.4**	68.9	1.9	3.2	0.8	0.1	1.7	6.9
2010	Chicago	**34**	**34**	26.0	43.0	18.2	69.3	2.6	3.4	1.0	**0.2**	2.2	9.0
2011	Chicago	22	8	15.0	31.8	14.3	57.6	1.2	2.0	0.5	0.1	1.5	4.1
2012	Washington	6	5	12.0	26.1	0.0	50.0	1.3	1.0	0.3	0.0	**1.3**	2.8
Career	14 years, 4 teams	380	267	24.0	38.4	17.7	69.6	2.5	2.8	0.9	0.1	1.8	7.3

==== Playoffs ====
Year	Team	GP	GS	MPG	FG%	3P%	FT%	RPG	APG	SPG	BPG	TO	PPG
1999	Detroit	1	0	21.0	33.3	0.0	**100.0**	3.0	1.0	**1.0**	0.0	2.0	6.0
2003	Houston	3	0	16.0	33.3	0.0	62.5	3.7	1.7	0.3	0.0	**1.0**	3.7
2005	Houston	**5**	**5**	**32.4**	40.0	0.0	80.0	**4.4**	**3.4**	0.2	0.0	2.8	8.0
2006	Houston	2	2	24.0	**75.0**	0.0	66.7	2.0	3.0	0.0	0.0	2.5	8.0
Career	4 years, 2 teams	11	7	25.4	43.4	0.0	75.0	3.6	2.6	0.3	0.0	2.2	6.6

== NWBL career ==
Canty played with the Chicago Blaze of the National Women's Basketball League prior to the 2003 WNBA season.

== International career ==
- 2004–2005: Bnei Yehuda Tel Aviv (Israel)
- 2005–2006: Hapoel Tel Aviv (Israel), won the League Championship.
- 2006–2007: Canty also played in a professional league (PLKK) in Poland for TS Wisła Can-Pack Kraków. In 2007, she won the championship with the team and was voted the season's MVP averaging 11.9 points per game. She is currently playing for them during the 2008–09 WNBA off-season.
- 2007–2008: Lotos PKO BP Gdynia – 12.3 points per game.
- 2008–2009: TS Wisla Can-Pack Kraków
