= Kayte Christensen =

American basketball player and commentator (born 1980)

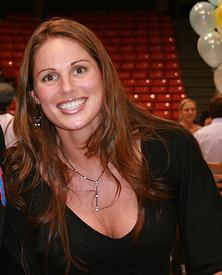
- Christensen in 2007

Personal information
- Born: November 16, 1980 (age 45) Lakeview, Oregon, U.S.
- Listed height: 6 ft 2 in (1.88 m)
- Listed weight: 171 lb (78 kg)

Career information
- High school: Modoc (Alturas, California)
- College: UC Santa Barbara (1998–2002)
- WNBA draft: 2002: 3rd round, 40th overall pick
- Drafted by: Phoenix Mercury
- Playing career: 2002–2008
- Position: Forward
- Number: 20

Career history
- 2002–2005: Phoenix Mercury
- 2006: Houston Comets
- 2006: Phoenix Mercury
- 2007–2008: Chicago Sky

Career highlights
- Big West Player of the Year (2002); 2× First-team All-Big West Team (2001, 2002); Big West All-Freshman Team (1999)

Career WNBA statistics
- Points: 463 (3.2 ppg)
- Rebounds: 373 (2.6 rpg)
- Steals: 90 (0.6 spg)
- Stats at Basketball Reference

Kayte Lauren Christensen (born November 16, 1980) is an American color commentator for the Sacramento Kings and former professional basketball player in the Women's National Basketball Association.

== Early life and education ==
Kayte Lauren Christensen was born in Lakeview, Oregon to Randy and Cathy Christensen. She attended Modoc High School in Alturas, California and graduated in 1998. She was named the Shasta Cascade League MVP in her sophomore, junior and senior seasons. Her senior season saw her named the California Division V Player of the Year in 1998 en route to winning the California Interscholastic Federation Division V championship.

Christensen attended college at the University of California, Santa Barbara where she competed on the women's basketball team with future WNBA players Erin Buescher, Lindsay Taylor, and Kristen Mann. She was named to the Big West Conference All-Freshman team in 1999 and was the 2002 Big West Player of the Year.

== Playing career ==
Christensen was selected by the Phoenix Mercury in the third round (40th overall) of the 2002 WNBA draft. She spent four seasons with the Mercury before she signed with the Houston Comets on March 24, 2006. She was waived on May 19, 2006, when she failed to make Houston's regular-season roster. She was signed to a short-term injury hardship contract by Houston on May 23, 2006, before rejoining the Mercury on June 15, 2006.

After the 2006 season ended, Christensen became a free agent until she signed a contract with the Chicago Sky on March 8, 2007. She was released from the Chicago Sky on May 20, 2008 after missing games due to a recurring back injury.

Christensen has played professional basketball overseas in South Korea, Turkey, and Greece during the WNBA offseasons.

Christensen has twice received the WNBA Offseason Community Assist Award, first in 2003 and second in 2004.

== Commentary career ==
Christensen served as the Arizona State Sun Devils women's basketball radio color analyst, beginning in 2003, for the Sun Devil Sports Network on NBC 1190 AM.

Christensen served as a courtside reporter for the NBA's Sacramento Kings during Comcast SportsNet broadcasts at Sleep Train Arena. In May 2010, she was replaced by Jim Gray. She returned to her courtside role in the Kings' 2013–14 season. Before the start of the 2021-22 NBA season the Kings announced that Christensen would replace Doug Christie as the team's television broadcast color analyst.

She also has worked as a women's basketball color analyst for ESPN and ESPNU, a social media correspondent for the Phoenix Suns, and a social media engagement producer for The Arizona Republic.

== Public diplomacy ==
In June 2011, Christensen traveled to Venezuela as a SportsUnited Sports Envoy for the U.S. Department of State. In this function, she worked with Darvin Ham to conduct basketball clinics for 300 youth from underserved areas and met with Venezuelan sports officials. In so doing, Christensen helped contribute to SportsUnited's mission to promote greater understanding and inclusion through sport.

== Personal life ==
On September 22, 2014 Christensen was arrested by the California Highway Patrol for driving under the influence (DUI).

Christensen is married to Joe Hunter, a two-time contestant on the reality series Survivor. They first married in 2018 before divorcing for three years and reconciling in 2024 after Hunter finished filming Survivor 48. They re-married in February 2025. Christensen and Hunter share a son and daughter.

== Career statistics ==
Legend
| GP | Games played | GS | Games started | MPG | Minutes per game | RPG | Rebounds per game |
| APG | Assists per game | SPG | Steals per game | BPG | Blocks per game | PPG | Points per game |
| TO | Turnovers per game | FG% | Field-goal percentage | 3P% | 3-point field-goal percentage | FT% | Free-throw percentage |
| **Bold** | Career best | ° | League leader |

=== WNBA ===
| Year | Team | GP | GS | MPG | FG% | 3P% | FT% | RPG | APG | SPG | BPG | TO | PPG |
|---|---|---|---|---|---|---|---|---|---|---|---|---|---|
| 2002 | Phoenix | 30 | 2 | 13.8 | **50.5** | 0.0 | 68.6 | 2.7 | 0.5 | **0.8** | 0.4 | 1.1 | 4.0 |
| 2003 | Phoenix | 30 | **16** | **22.0** | 48.4 | — | 60.2 | **4.2** | 0.5 | **0.8** | **0.5** | 1.3 | **6.9** |
| 2004 | Phoenix | **32** | 1 | 12.7 | 38.8 | — | 63.2 | 2.2 | **0.7** | 0.7 | 0.2 | 0.8 | 1.6 |
| 2005 | Phoenix | 11 | 1 | 9.8 | 46.7 | — | 57.1 | 2.0 | 0.6 | 0.6 | **0.5** | 0.9 | 1.6 |
| 2006 | Houston | 6 | 0 | 14.5 | 50.0 | — | **100.0** | 3.2 | **0.7** | 0.0 | 0.0 | 1.8 | 3.0 |
| 2006 | Phoenix | 11 | 0 | 4.8 | 16.7 | — | 50.0 | 1.3 | 0.2 | 0.3 | 0.1 | **0.5** | 0.3 |
| 2007 | Chicago | 23 | 7 | 9.2 | 41.7 | — | 44.4 | 1.9 | 0.3 | 0.4 | 0.2 | 0.9 | 2.1 |
| **Career** | 6 years, 3 teams | 143 | 27 | 13.6 | 46.4 | 0.0 | 60.8 | 2.6 | 0.5 | 0.6 | 0.3 | 1.0 | 3.2 |

=== College ===
NCAA statistics
| Year | Team | GP | GS | MPG | FG% | 3P% | FT% | RPG | APG | SPG | BPG | TO | PPG |
|---|---|---|---|---|---|---|---|---|---|---|---|---|---|
| 1998–99 | Santa Barbara | 30 | - | - | 55.1 | **100.0** | 62.1 | 5.6 | 0.4 | 0.9 | 0.6 | - | 8.0 |
| 1999–00 | Santa Barbara | 18 | - | - | **56.5** | 0.0 | 50.8 | 6.3 | 0.4 | 1.4 | **1.5** | - | 10.4 |
| 2000–01 | Santa Barbara | 31 | - | - | 54.9 | 0.0 | **66.7** | 7.6 | **0.9** | 1.5 | 1.1 | - | 13.7 |
| 2001–02 | Santa Barbara | **32** | - | - | 54.3 | 0.0 | 65.5 | **9.1** | 0.8 | 1.5 | 0.5 | - | **14.5** |
| **Career** | | 111 | - | - | 54.9 | 11.1 | 63.1 | 7.3 | 0.7 | 1.3 | 0.9 | - | 11.9 |
