= List of WNBA annual 3-point field goal percentage leaders =

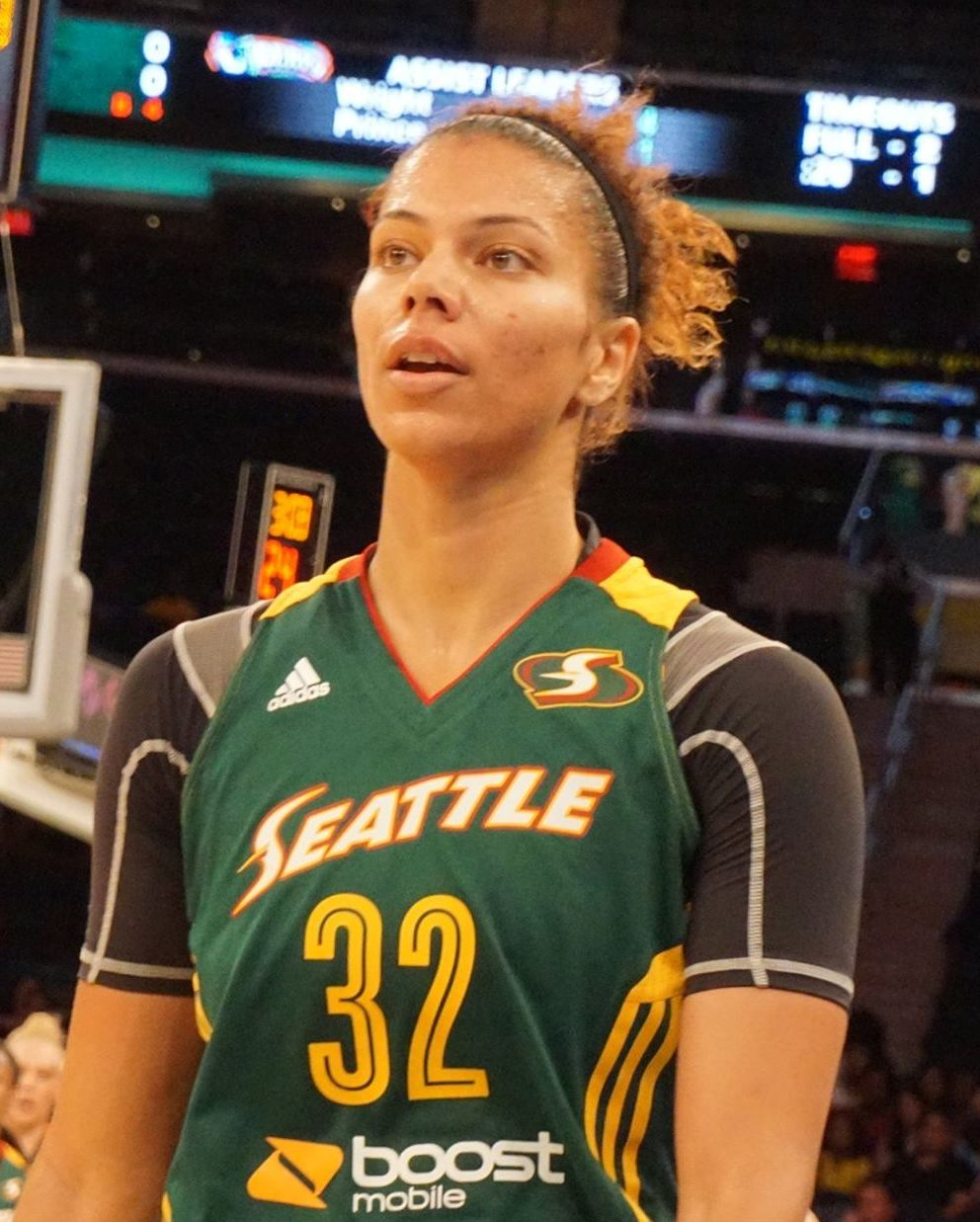
Alysha Clark (pictured) is one of five players to lead the league in 3-point field goal percentage in two distinct seasons.

In basketball, a three-point field goal (also known as a "three-pointer" or "3-pointer") is a field goal made from beyond the three-point line, a designated arc radiating from the basket. A successful attempt is worth three points, in contrast to the two points awarded for shots made inside the three-point line. The Women's National Basketball Association's (WNBA) three-point shooting percentage leader is the player with the highest three-point field goal percentage in a given season.

Alysha Clark, Briann January, Eva Horáková, Jennifer Azzi, and Laurie Koehn have all led the league in three-point shooting percentage a record two times. Temeka Johnson, who shot 53.12% from beyond the arc in the 2012, holds the all-time record for three-point field goal percentage in a season. Alysha Clark in 2019 and 2020, Eva Horáková in 1997 and 1998, and Laurie Koehn in 2005 and 2006 are the only players that led the league in three-point shooting percentage in consecutive years.

Becky Hammon is the only leader in this statistic that has been inducted into the Naismith Memorial Basketball Hall of Fame.

== Annual leaders ==
Key
^		Denotes player who is still active in the WNBA			
*		Inducted into the Naismith Memorial Basketball Hall of Fame			
Player (X)		Denotes the number of times the player had been the three-point shooting leader up to and including that season			
G	Guard	F	Forward	C	Center

Season	Player	Position (Note: The player's primary position is listed first.)	Team(s)	Games played	3-point field goals made	3-point field goals attempted	3P FG%
1997	Eva Horáková	F	Cleveland Rockers	28	37	85	.4353
1998	Eva Horáková (2)	F	Cleveland Rockers	30	28	62	.4516
1999	Jennifer Azzi	G	Detroit Shock	28	30	58	.5172
2000	Korie Hlede	G	Utah Starzz	31	25	58	.4310
2001	Jennifer Azzi (2)	G	Utah Starzz/San Antonio Silver Stars	32	38	74	.5135
2002	Kelly Miller	G	Charlotte Sting	32	24	51	.4706
2003	Becky Hammon*	G	New York Liberty	11	23	49	.4694
2004	Charlotte Smith	F	Charlotte Sting	34	29	58	.5000
2005	Laurie Koehn	G	Washington Mystics	30	35	75	.4667
2006	Laurie Koehn (2)	G	Washington Mystics	32	22	42	.5238
2007	Catherine Joens	F	Chicago Sky	19	22	45	.4889
2007	Kristin Haynie	G	Sacramento Monarchs	34	22	45	.4889
2008	Lisa Willis	G	New York Liberty	34	44	94	.4681
2008	Edwige Lawson-Wade	G	San Antonio Silver Stars	30	22	47	.4681
2009	Tangela Smith	F/C	Phoenix Mercury	34	42	93	.4516
2010	Leilani Mitchell	G	New York Liberty	34	72	148	.4865
2011	Jeanette Pohlen-Mavunga	G	Indiana Fever	34	29	62	.4677
2012	Temeka Johnson	G	Tulsa Shock	29	34	64	.5312
2013	Jenna O'Hea	G/F	Los Angeles Sparks	29	20	40	.5000
2014	Erin Phillips	G	Phoenix Mercury	33	35	79	.4487
2015	Briann January	G	Indiana Fever	29	25	58	.4310
2016	Emma Meesseman^	F	Washington Mystics	34	30	67	.4478
2017	Chelsea Gray	G	Los Angeles Sparks	34	53	110	.4818
2018	Briann January (2)	G	Phoenix Mercury	33	47	100	.4700
2019	Alysha Clark	F	Seattle Storm	31	51	106	.4811
2020	Alysha Clark (2)	F	Seattle Storm	22	35	67	.5224
2021	Epiphanny Prince	G	Seattle Storm	29	25	50	.5000
2022	Moriah Jefferson	G	Dallas Wings / Minnesota Lynx	31	36	76	.4737
2023	Tyasha Harris	G	Connecticut Sun	40	39	84	.4643
2024	Emily Engstler	F	Washington Mystics	32	27	57	.4737
2025	Sonia Citron	G	Washington Mystics	44	81	182	.4451
2026	Kelsey Mitchell	G	Indiana Fever	44	135	300	.4500

== Multiple-time leaders ==
Rank	Player	Team	Times leader	Years
2	Alysha Clark	Seattle Storm	2	2019, 2020
2	Briann January	Indiana Fever (1) / Phoenix Mercury (1)	2	2015, 2018
2	Eva Horáková	Cleveland Rockers	2	1997, 1998
2	Jennifer Azzi	Detroit Shock (1) / Utah Starzz/San Antonio Silver Stars (1)	2	1999, 2001
2	Laurie Koehn	Washington Mystics	2	2005, 2006

== See also ==
- List of WNBA career 3-point scoring leaders
- List of WNBA regular season records
