= Bo Overton =

American basketball player-coach

Oklahoma Baptist Bison
- Title: Head coach
- League: Great American Conference

Personal information
- Born: July 9, 1960 (age 66) Ada, Oklahoma, U.S.
- Listed height: 6 ft 2 in (1.88 m)
- Listed weight: 175 lb (79 kg)

Career information
- High school: Ada (Ada, Oklahoma)
- College: Oklahoma (1979–1983)
- NBA draft: 1983: 9th round, 224th overall pick
- Drafted by: Phoenix Suns
- Playing career: 1984–1985
- Position: Guard
- Coaching career: 1983–present

Career history

Playing
- 1984–1985: Toronto Tornados

Coaching
- 1983–1984: Oklahoma (men's GA)
- 1985–1986: Pensacola Tornados (assistant)
- 1987–1988: Oral Roberts (men's assistant)
- 1989–1991: Murray State CC (men's)
- 1991–1993: Oral Roberts (men's assistant)
- 1993–1994: Southwest Texas State (men's assistant)
- 1994–1998: Louisiana Tech (men's assistant)
- 1998–2004: Oklahoma (assistant)
- 2004–2006: UMKC
- 2007: Chicago Sky
- 2011–2012: Liaoning Hengye
- 2012–2013: Guangdong Dolphins
- 2013–2014: Dynamo Kursk
- 2015–2020: Oklahoma City
- 2020–Present: Oklahoma Baptist
- Stats at Basketball Reference

Glenn "Bo" Overton (born July 9, 1960) is an American basketball coach who is currently the head women's basketball coach at Oklahoma Baptist University. Prior to OBU, he was coaching in the Women's Chinese Basketball Association. As a player, he was selected by the Phoenix Suns in the 1983 NBA draft.

== Early life and education ==
Born in Ada, Oklahoma, Overton was the 1979 Oklahoma High School Basketball Player of the Year as a senior at Ada High School.

Overton played at the University of Oklahoma from 1980 to 1983, and was a starting point guard. At the end of his career, he held school records for free throw percentage, assists and games played.

== Professional playing career ==
He was selected by the Phoenix Suns in the 1983 NBA draft. He played for the Toronto Tornadoes of the Continental Basketball Association in the 1984–85 season, then was an assistant coach for that team, which by then moved to Pensacola, Florida, in the 1985–86 season.

== Coaching career ==
He was the head coach and athletic director at Murray State College in Tishomingo, Oklahoma from 1989 to 1991. Overton was a men's basketball assistant coach at Oral Roberts (1987 to 1988 and 1991 to 1993), Texas State (1993 to 1994), and Louisiana Tech (1994 to 1998) as a men's assistant coach.

Overton returned to his alma mater to coach Oklahoma Sooners women's basketball under Sherri Coale. The Sooners played in the 2002 Final Four. After OU he was the head coach at UMKC.

On December 12, 2006, Overton resigned from UMKC to become head coach for the Chicago Sky of the WNBA. He resigned on March 12, 2008, following a 14–20 season.

Overton was a consultant to the WNBA's Tulsa Shock from 2008 to 2009. From 2009 to 2010, he was an assistant coach for the Bahamas women's national basketball team. Overton then coached for Liaoning Hengye of the Women's Chinese Basketball Association (WCBA) from 2011 to 2012. Overton then coached the China women's national basketball team during the 2012 Summer Olympics, then the Guangdong Dragons of the WCBA in the 2012–13 season and Dynamo Kursk of the Russian Women's Basketball Premier League in 2013–14.

In 2015, Overton became head women's basketball coach at Oklahoma City University. He would lead Oklahoma City to a NAIA national championship in the 2016–17 season and named coach of the year.

On March 16, 2020, Overton was named the head coach at Oklahoma Baptist University.

== Head coaching record ==
=== College ===
Record table
| Season | Team | Overall | Conference | Standing | Postseason |
|---|---|---|---|---|---|
UMKC Kangaroos (Mid-Continent Conference) (2004–2006)
| 2004–05 | UMKC | 10–20 | 6–10 | 7th | |
| 2005–06 | UMKC | 10–18 | 8–8 | 6th | |
| 2006–07 | UMKC | 2–9 | | (resigned) | |
| UMKC: | | 22–47 (.319) | 14–18 (.438) | | |
Oklahoma City Stars (Sooner Athletic Conference) (2015–2020)
| 2015–16 | Oklahoma City | 20–9 | 15–3 | 2nd | NAIA D-I First Round |
| 2016–17 | Oklahoma City | 34–2 | 17–1 | 1st | NAIA D-I Champions |
| 2017–18 | Oklahoma City | 28–6 | 17–3 | T–1st | NAIA D-I First Round |
| 2018–19 | Oklahoma City | 33–5 | 20–2 | 1st | NAIA D-I Runner-up |
| 2019–20 | Oklahoma City | 30–2 | 19–1 | T–1st | Postseason canceled |
| Oklahoma City: | | 145–33 (.815) | 88–10 (.898) | | |
Oklahoma Baptist Bison (Great American Conference) (2020–present)
| 2020–21 | Oklahoma Baptist | 4–17 | 3–15 | 6th (Western) | |
| 2021–22 | Oklahoma Baptist | 14–14 | 10–12 | T–8th | |
| 2022–23 | Oklahoma Baptist | 17–13 | 12–10 | T–4th | |
| Oklahoma Baptist: | | 35–44 (.443) | 25–37 (.403) | | |
| Total: | | 202–124 (.620) | | | |
National champion Postseason invitational champion Conference regular season champion Conference regular season and conference tournament champion Division regular season champion Division regular season and conference tournament champion Conference tournament champion

=== WNBA ===
Legend
| Regular season | G | Games coached | W | Games won | L | Games lost | W–L % | Win–loss % |
| Playoffs | PG | Playoff games | PW | Playoff wins | PL | Playoff losses | PW–L % | Playoff win–loss % |

| Team | Year | G | W | L | W–L% | Finish | PG | PW | PL | PW–L% | Result |
|---|---|---|---|---|---|---|---|---|---|---|---|
| Chicago | 2007 | 34 | 14 | 20 | .412 | 6th in Eastern | — | — | — | — | — |
| Career | | 34 | 14 | 20 | .412 | | — | — | — | — | |
