= Stephanie Raymond =

American basketball player (born 1985)

Personal information
- Born: January 15, 1985 (age 41) Rockford, Illinois, U.S.
- Listed height: 5 ft 5 in (1.65 m)
- Listed weight: 139 lb (63 kg)

Career information
- High school: Rockford Lutheran (Rockford, Illinois)
- College: Northern Illinois (2003–2007)
- WNBA draft: 2007: 2nd round, 20th overall pick
- Drafted by: Chicago Sky
- Position: Guard
- Number: 33

Career history
- 2007: Chicago Sky

Career highlights
- First-team All-MAC (2007); MAC All-Freshman Team (2004)
- Stats at Basketball Reference

Stephanie Raymond (born January 15, 1985) is an American former professional basketball player who played for the Chicago Sky of the WNBA. She scored a total of 61 points in 20 games with the Sky.

== Career statistics ==
Legend
GP	Games played	GS	Games started	MPG	Minutes per game	RPG	Rebounds per game
APG	Assists per game	SPG	Steals per game	BPG	Blocks per game	PPG	Points per game
TO	Turnovers per game	FG%	Field-goal percentage	3P%	3-point field-goal percentage	FT%	Free-throw percentage
**Bold**	Career best	°	League leader

=== WNBA career statistics ===
==== Regular season ====
Year	Team	GP	GS	MPG	FG%	3P%	FT%	RPG	APG	SPG	BPG	TO	PPG
2007	Chicago	20	0	9.0	32.8	31.8	53.8	0.7	1.4	0.2	0.0	0.9	3.1
Career	1 year, 1 team	20	0	9.0	32.8	31.8	53.8	0.7	1.4	0.2	0.0	0.9	3.1

=== College career statistics ===
Legend
GP	Games played	GS	Games started	MPG	Minutes per game
FG%	Field goal percentage	3P%	3-point field goal percentage	FT%	Free throw percentage
RPG	Rebounds per game	APG	Assists per game	SPG	Steals per game
BPG	Blocks per game	PPG	Points per game	**Bold**	Career high

Year	Team	GP	Points	FG%	3P%	FT%	RPG	APG	SPG	BPG	PPG
2003–04	Northern Illinois	27	241	39.5	**43.0**	73.5	3.1	2.9	1.7	0.4	8.9
2004–05	Northern Illinois	28	434	39.2	30.7	84.9	**5.9**	3.4	**3.8**	0.3	15.5
2005–06	Northern Illinois	28	458	42.7	36.3	81.1	4.0	4.4	2.1	0.2	16.4
2006–07	Northern Illinois	**31**	**586**	**43.5**	36.6	**90.1**	4.5	**6.5**	1.9	0.4	**18.9**
Career	Northern Illinois	114	1719	41.5	35.8	83.9	4.4	4.4	2.4	0.3	15.1
