= 2007 Washington Mystics season =

- Head coach: Richie Adubato (0–4); Tree Rollins (16–14)
- Arena: Verizon Center

Results
- Record: 16–18 (.471)
- Place: 5th (Eastern)
- Playoff finish: Did not qualify

The 2007 WNBA season was the tenth for the Washington Mystics. The Mystics fell short for the playoffs, losing in a tiebreaker to the New York Liberty.

== Offseason ==
=== Dispersal Draft ===
Based on the Mystics' 2006 record, they would pick 6th in the Charlotte Sting dispersal draft. The Mystics picked Teana Miller.

=== WNBA draft ===
Round	Pick	Player	Nationality	School/Club team
1	6	Bernice Mosby	United States	Baylor
2	19	Megan Vogel	United States	South Dakota State
3	32	Gillian Goring	Trinidad and Tobago	North Carolina State

== Regular season ==
=== Season standings ===
Eastern Conference	W	L	PCT	GB	Home	Road	Conf.
Detroit Shock ^{x}	24	10	.706	–	12–5	12–5	14–6
Indiana Fever ^{x}	21	13	.618	3.0	12–5	9–8	12–8
Connecticut Sun ^{x}	18	16	.529	6.0	8–9	10–7	10–10
New York Liberty ^{x}	16	18	.471	8.0	10–7	6–11	10–10
Washington Mystics ^{o}	16	18	.471	8.0	8–9	8–9	8–12
Chicago Sky ^{o}	14	20	.412	10.0	6–11	8–9	6–14

=== Season schedule ===
Date	Opponent	Score	Result	Record
May 19	Connecticut	80-89	Loss	0-1
May 22	Sacramento	52-70	Loss	0-2
May 24	@ New York	76-81	Loss	0-3
May 30	@ Detroit	79-94	Loss	0-4
June 1	Chicago	70-75	Loss	0-5
June 3	@ Indiana	66-70	Loss	0-6
June 8	Indiana	69-74	Loss	0-7
June 12	@ New York	69-79	Loss	0-8
June 13	Phoenix	86-69	Win	1-8
June 15	Los Angeles	80-89	Loss	1-9
June 20	@ Phoenix	106-101	Win	2-9
June 22	@ Houston	85-95	Loss	2-10
June 23	@ Chicago	99-86	Win	3-10
June 26	@ Connecticut	91-75	Win	4-10
June 29	Detroit	65-64	Win	5-10
July 1	Indiana	62-69	Loss	5-11
July 3	San Antonio	79-84	Loss	5-12
July 7	@ Chicago	77-73	Win	6-12
July 10	Minnesota	91-83 (OT)	Win	7-12
July 18	Houston	65-58	Win	8-12
July 20	@ Minnesota	91-87 (OT)	Win	9-12
July 21	@ Detroit	58-66	Loss	9-13
July 24	Seattle	97-96 (OT)	Win	10-13
July 28	Detroit	64-76	Loss	10-14
July 31	@ Indiana	57-66	Loss	10-15
August 3	New York	80-68	Win	11-15
August 5	Chicago	71-66	Win	12-15
August 7	@ San Antonio	77-73	Win	13-15
August 9	@ Los Angeles	80-75	Win	14-15
August 11	@ Seattle	68-91	Loss	14-16
August 12	@ Sacramento	82-86 (OT)	Loss	14-17
August 14	Connecticut	65-64	Win	15-17
August 16	New York	72-73	Loss	15-18
August 19	@ Connecticut	76-74	Win	16-18

== Player stats ==
Player	GP	REB	AST	STL	BLK	PTS
Alana Beard	33	139	99	64	24	622
DeLisha Milton-Jones	34	217	55	52	38	456
Nakia Sanford	34	242	23	27	28	375
Monique Currie	31	121	54	23	7	325
Nikki Teasley	33	73	109	23	6	172
Tamara James	31	49	34	25	4	164
Coco Miller	30	49	25	19	2	120
Nikki Blue	30	63	48	22	5	107
Bernice Mosby	28	78	10	8	6	78
Gillian Goring	21	41	3	5	12	54
Laurie Koehn	28	8	5	0	0	40
Chasity Melvin	3	20	0	6	0	34
Stacey Lovelace	9	13	2	4	0	24
Yelena Leuchanka	6	3	3	2	0	4
Crystal Robinson	2	2	2	1	1	2
