= Calvary Chapel Christian Schools Murrieta =

Christian school system in California, United States

Calvary Murrieta Christian School

Location
- Murrieta, California; United States
- Coordinates: 33°34′17″N 117°12′46″W

Information
- Other name: CMCS
- Type: Private
- Motto: Equipping for Today and for Tomorrow
- Established: 1993
- Colors: Royal Blue, Black and White
- Athletics: CIF - Southern Section: South Valley League
- Mascot: Warrior
- Affiliations: ACSI; WASC
- Website: www.cmcsweb.com

Calvary Murrieta Christian Schools (CMCS) is a private Christian school education system in Murrieta, California, United States, which was founded by the Calvary Chapel of Murrieta Church.

CMCS runs three schools at preschool, elementary, and middle school levels, and is based at 24275 Monroe Avenue, Murrieta, CA 92562.

== Background ==
Calvary Murrieta Christian Schools (CMCS) was established in 1993 by Calvary Murrieta church with the mission to partner with families in the education and development of students committed to serving Christ.

The elementary division at CMCS includes courses in Bible study, mathematics, reading, English, writing, history, and science. Additional enrichment classes are available in art, technology, physical education, library skills, music, and science.

In junior high, students study core subjects including the Bible, English, math, science, and history. The electives in this division include art, technology, physical education, music, yearbook, and associated student body (ASB) activities.
