= Candice Dupree =

American basketball player and coach (born 1984)

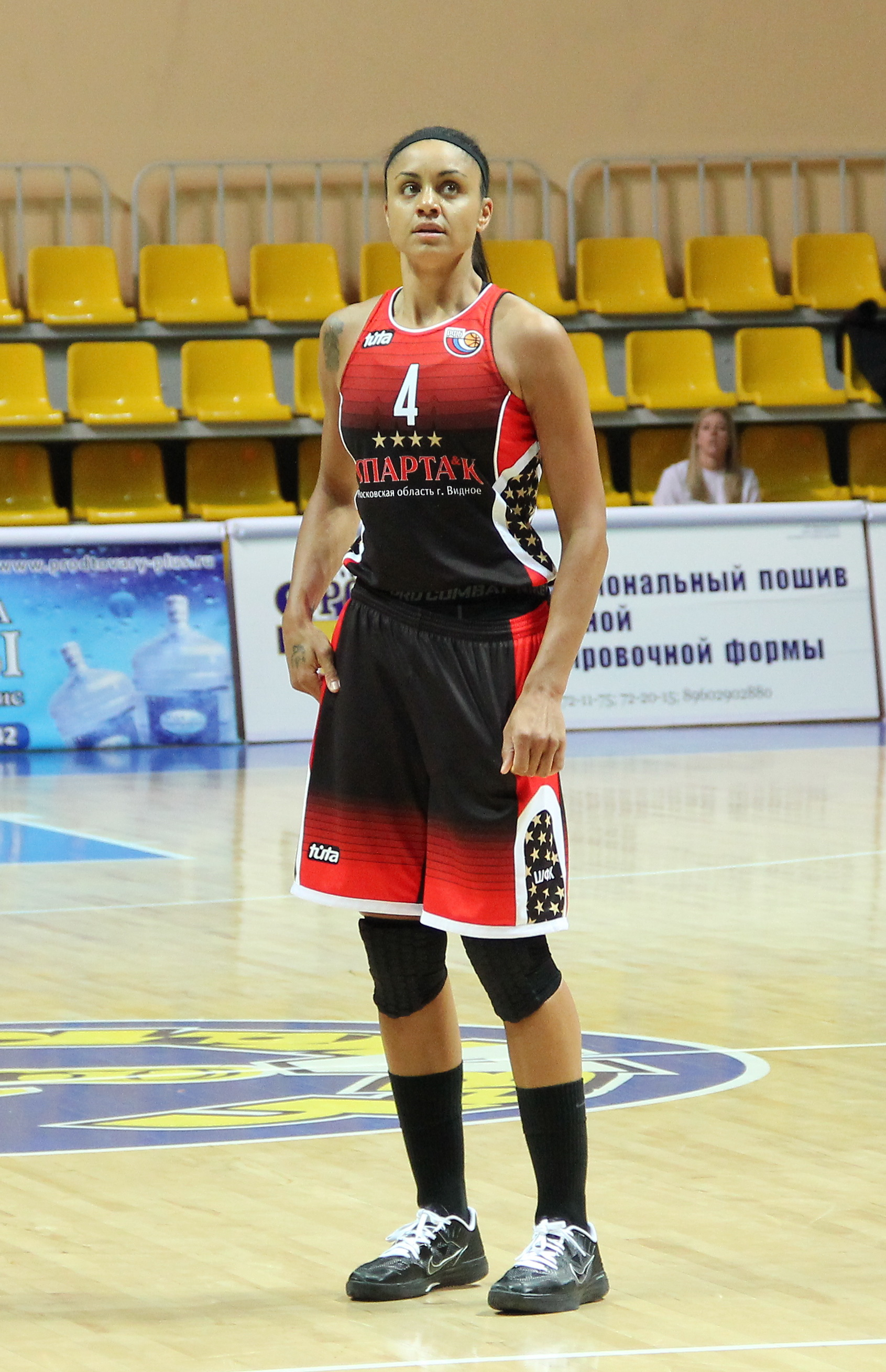
- Dupree with Spartak Moscow in 2013

Tennessee State Lady Tigers
- Title: Head coach
- League: Ohio Valley Conference

Personal information
- Born: August 16, 1984 (age 42) Midwest City, Oklahoma, U.S.
- Listed height: 6 ft 2 in (1.88 m)
- Listed weight: 178 lb (81 kg)

Career information
- High school: Paul R. Wharton (Tampa, Florida)
- College: Temple (2002–2006)
- WNBA draft: 2006: 1st round, 6th overall pick
- Drafted by: Chicago Sky
- Playing career: 2006–2021
- Position: Power forward
- Coaching career: 2022–present

Career history

Playing
- 2006–2009: Chicago Sky
- 2007–2009: WBC Wisła Kraków
- 2009–2011: Good Angels Košice
- 2010–2016: Phoenix Mercury
- 2011–2013: WBC Spartak Moscow Region
- 2013–2014: Dynamo Kursk
- 2014–2015: Zhejiang Golden Bulls
- 2015: Nadezhda Orenburg
- 2016–2017: ZVVZ USK Praha
- 2017–2020: Indiana Fever
- 2018–2020: Sopron Basket
- 2021: ZVVZ USK Praha
- 2021: Seattle Storm
- 2021: Atlanta Dream

Coaching
- 2022–2024: San Antonio Spurs (player development)
- 2024–present: Tennessee State

Career highlights
- WNBA champion (2014); 7× WNBA All-Star (2006, 2007, 2009, 2014, 2015, 2017, 2019); WNBA All-Rookie Team (2006); Hungarian champion (2019); Third-team All-American – AP (2006); 2× First-team All-A-10 Team (2005, 2006); 2× A-10 Player of the Year (2005, 2006); 2× A-10 Defensive Player of the Year (2005, 2006); 3× A-10 All-Defensive Team (2004–2006); A-10 All-Freshman Team (2003)
- Stats at WNBA.com
- Stats at Basketball Reference
Medals
Representing the United States
FIBA World Championship for Women
Gold medal – first place	2010 Czech Republic	National team
Gold medal – first place	2014 Turkey	National team
World University Games
Gold medal – first place	2005 Izmir	Team

Candice Dupree (born August 16, 1984) is an American basketball coach and former player who is the head coach for the women's basketball team at Tennessee State University. She was selected sixth in the 2006 WNBA draft by the Chicago Sky. In 2014, Dupree won the WNBA Championship with the Phoenix Mercury. She has also played basketball professionally in Europe and Asia. She has won two FIBA World Cups with Team USA.

Dupree was hired by the San Antonio Spurs as a Player Development coach in 2022.

== Personal life ==
Dupree grew up in Tampa, Florida. She played basketball and volleyball at Paul R. Wharton High School. She has two siblings, a twin sister and another, younger sister. Dupree played basketball at Temple University from 2002 to 2006. She won numerous awards and accolades as a college basketball player, drawing comparisons to the NBA's Tim Duncan.

Dupree was married to former Mercury teammate DeWanna Bonner. In 2017, Bonner gave birth to twin girls, Cali and Demi.

== College statistics ==
Legend
GP	Games played	GS	Games started	MPG	Minutes per game
FG%	Field goal percentage	3P%	3-point field goal percentage	FT%	Free throw percentage
RPG	Rebounds per game	APG	Assists per game	SPG	Steals per game
BPG	Blocks per game	PPG	Points per game	**Bold**	Career high

Year	Team	GP	Points	FG%	3P%	FT%	RPG	APG	SPG	BPG	PPG
2002–03	Temple	18	188	.432	–	.522	7.6	1.3	1.9	1.4	10.4
2003–04	Temple	31	431	**.547**	–	.529	7.6	0.8	1.4	1.9	13.9
2004–05	Temple	**32**	521	.539	–	.669	**9.1**	1.7	**2.2**	2.1	16.3
2005–06	Temple	**32**	**558**	.506	**.176**	**.723**	8.7	**2.1**	1.6	**2.2**	**17.4**
Career		113	1,698	.515	.158	.630	8.3	1.5	1.7	1.9	15.0

== WNBA career ==
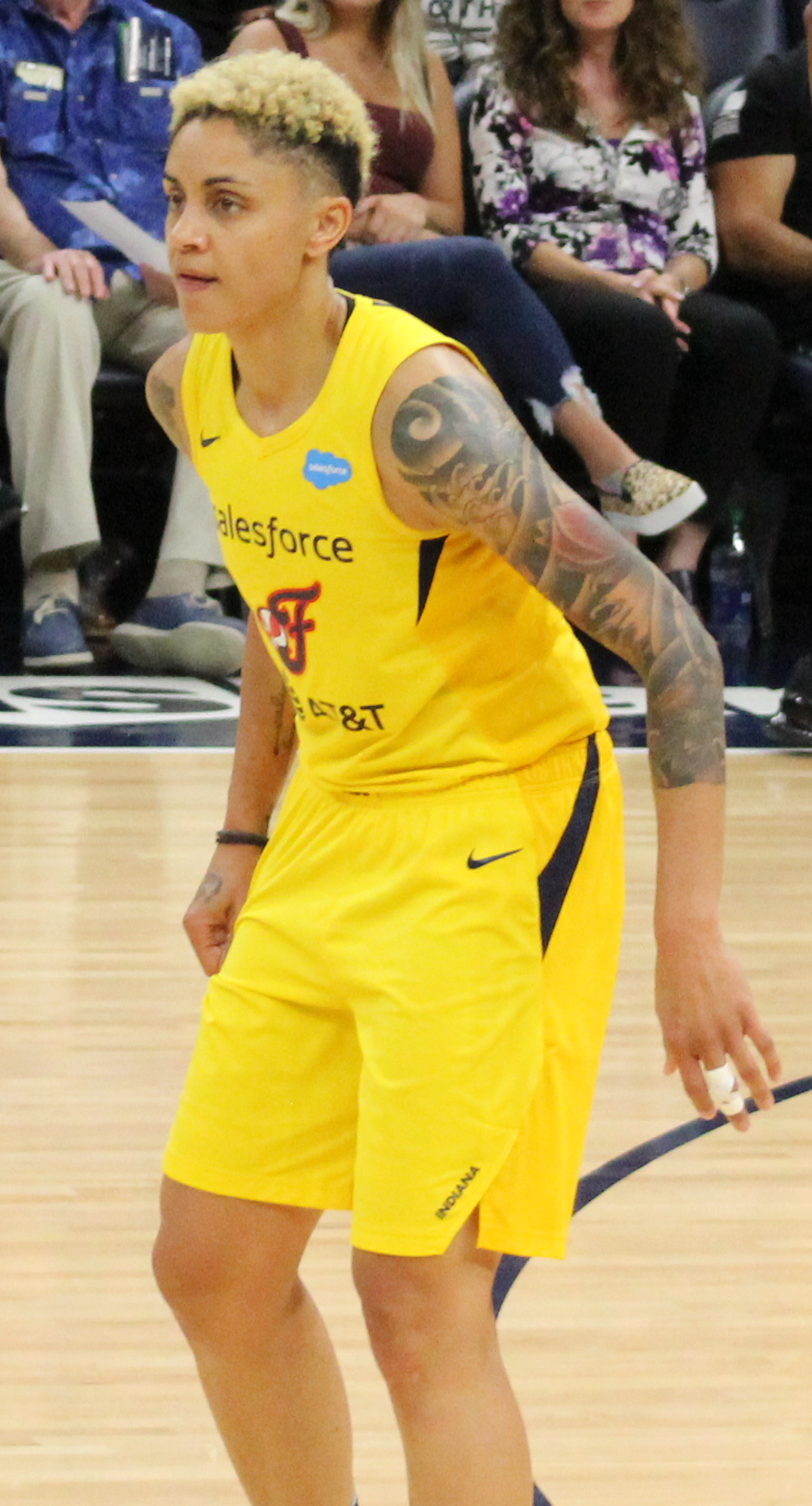
Dupree playing for the Indiana Fever in 2019

Dupree was selected 6th overall in the 2006 WNBA draft by the Chicago Sky, an expansion team that year. As a rookie, she was named to the Eastern Conference WNBA All Star team. In her first All-Star game, she competed against her former college coach Dawn Staley. Dupree was also named to the Eastern Conference WNBA All-Star Team in 2007 and 2009 in the WNBA (there was no WNBA All Star game in 2008 due to the Olympics). For the 2009 season, Dupree tied for second place in the WNBA with 268 total rebounds.

In March 2010, Dupree was traded to the Phoenix Mercury as part of a multi-player, three-team deal. Dupree requested the trade.

Dupree would win her first WNBA championship with the Mercury in 2014 as they swept her former team, the Chicago Sky 3–0 in the finals. Dupree had 24 points and 6 assists in the final game of the series. During the 2014 season, Dupree was playing alongside Diana Taurasi and Brittney Griner while the Mercury had a record-breaking regular season record of 29–5 en route to the title.

In the 2015 season, Dupree was named a WNBA All-Star for the fifth time in her career as she averaged 14.1 ppg. The Mercury would make it to the playoffs in an attempt to defend their title but were swept in the second round by the Minnesota Lynx who won the championship that year.

In 2017, Dupree was traded to the Indiana Fever along with the Mercury's 2017 first-round pick in a three-team deal that sent Camille Little and Jillian Alleyne to the Mercury and the Connecticut Sun receiving the 8th overall pick in the 2017 WNBA draft along with Lynetta Kizer from the Fever. During the 2017 season, Dupree would be voted into the 2017 WNBA All-Star Game, making it her sixth career all-star game appearance. Dupree averaged 15 points per game, but the Fever finished with league's second worst record of 9–25.

In March 2018, Dupree re-signed with the Fever to a multi-year deal. In 2018, the Fever would have yet another disappointing season, finishing last place with a 6–28 record.

In 2019, Dupree was voted into the 2019 WNBA All-Star Game, making it her seventh all-star appearance due to her performance during the season, however the Fever once again fell short of a playoff spot with a 13–21 record.

In 2020, the season was delayed and shortened to 22 games in a bubble at IMG Academy due to the COVID-19 pandemic. Dupree played all 22 games and averaged 12.5 ppg, but the Fever finished as the second worst team in the league with a 6–16 record.

In 2021, Dupree signed a one-year deal with the Seattle Storm who were the defending champions.

== Shooting Stars ==
Dupree, along with then-Chicago Bulls guard Ben Gordon and ex-Bulls star Scottie Pippen, participated in the Shooting Stars competition at the 2007 NBA All-Star Game Weekend. In 2008, Dupree again represented Chicago at the Shooting Stars competition, along with Chris Duhon and B. J. Armstrong.

== Overseas career ==
Dupree played professional basketball in Poland, for the TS Wisła Can-Pack Kraków club, during the 2007–08 and 2008–09 WNBA off-seasons. In 2008, Wisla Can Pack won the PLKK league championship, and Dupree was named Most Valuable Player of the championship series. In 2009, Dupree was named to the "Rest of the World" (non-European) squad for the EuroLeague Women All Star Game. Dupree played two consecutive off-seasons for Good Angels Košice in Slovakia from 2009 to 2011, winning a national championship with the team. From 2011 to 2015, Dupree played four off-seasons in Russia for WBC Spartak Moscow Region, Dynamo Kursk and Nadezhda Orenburg. Dupree also spent the first portion of the 2014–15 off-season playing in China for the Zhejiang Golden Bulls of the WCBA As of August 2016, Dupree signed with ZVVZ USK Praha for the 2016-17 off-season. In September 2018, Dupree signed with Sopron Basket of the Hungarian league for the 2018-19 off-season, she would return to the team for the following year. In January 2021, Dupree made her second stint with ZVVZ USK Praha for the 2020-21 off-season.

== USA Basketball ==
Dupree was a member of the team representing the US at the 2005 World University Games Team in Izmir, Turkey. In the quarterfinals against Taiwan, she led her team in scoring with 16 points. Dupree averaged 7.6 points per game, helping the team to a 7–0 record, and a gold medal at the event.

Dupree was invited to the USA Basketball Women's National Team training camp in the fall of 2009. Dupree was one of twenty players named to the national team pool. Twelve of this group will be chosen to represent the US in the 2010 World Championships and the 2012 Summer Olympics.

Dupree was named as one of the National team members to represent the USA Basketball team in the WNBA versus USA Basketball. This game replaces the normal WNBA All-Star game with WNBA All-Stars versus USA Basketball, as part of the preparation for the FIBA World Championship for Women to be held in the Czech Republic during September and October 2010. Dupree was selected to be a member of the National team representing the US at the World Championships held in September and October 2010. The team was coached by Geno Auriemma. Because many team members were still playing in the WNBA until just prior to the event, the team had only one day of practice with the entire team before leaving for Ostrava and Karlovy Vary, Czech Republic. Even with limited practice, the team managed to win its first games against Greece by 26 points. The team continued to dominate with victory margins exceeding 20 points in the first five games. Several players shared scoring honors, with Swin Cash, Angel McCoughtry, Maya Moore, Diana Taurasi, Lindsay Whalen, and Sylvia Fowles all ending as high scorer in the first few games. The sixth game was against undefeated Australia — the USA jumped out to a 24-point lead and the USA prevailed 83–75. The USA won its next two games by over 30 points, then faced the host team, the Czech Republic, in the championship game. The USA team had only a five-point lead at halftime, which was cut to three points, but the Czechs never got closer. Team USA went on to win the championship and gold medal. Dupree averaged 9.2 points per game while hitting 75% of her field goal attempts. She led the team in rebounds with 6.0 per game.

== Vital statistics ==
- Position: Forward, center
- Height: 6 ft 2 in (1.88 m)
- College: Temple University
- Team(s): Chicago Sky, Phoenix Mercury; Indiana Fever

== Awards and achievements ==
- Member of the Atlantic 10 All-Rookie Team in 2003 and second team in 2004.
- Named Atlantic 10 and Philadelphia Big Five Player of the Year in 2005.
- Named the 2005 Atlantic 10 Defensive Player of the Year.
- Named 2005 Associated Press All-American Honorable Mention.
- Member of the 2005 Atlantic 10 first team and two-time Big Five first team selection in 2004 and 2005.
- Named Atlantic 10 and Philadelphia Big Five Player of the Year in 2006.
- Named the 2006 Atlantic 10 Defensive Player of the Year.
- Named to 2006 Associated Press All-American Third Team.
- Selected for Atlantic 10 All-Defensive Team in 2004, 2005, and 2006.
- Named MVP of the Atlantic 10 Tournament in 2004, 2005, and 2006.
- Named Philadelphia-area Player of the Decade by Philadelphia Inquirer in 2010.
- 2006, 2007, 2009, 2014, 2015 and 2017 WNBA All-Star Selection.
- 2014 WNBA Championship.

== WNBA career statistics ==
Legend
GP	Games played	GS	Games started	MPG	Minutes per game	RPG	Rebounds per game
APG	Assists per game	SPG	Steals per game	BPG	Blocks per game	PPG	Points per game
TO	Turnovers per game	FG%	Field-goal percentage	3P%	3-point field-goal percentage	FT%	Free-throw percentage
**Bold**	Career best	°	League leader

†	Denotes seasons in which Dupree won a WNBA championship

=== WNBA regular season ===
Year	Team	GP	GS	MPG	FG%	3P%	FT%	RPG	APG	SPG	BPG	TO	PPG
2006	Chicago	**34**	31	30.4	.457	.000	.779	5.5	1.8	**1.2**	0.7	1.7	13.7
2007	Chicago	33	33	32.7	.446	.000	.775	7.7	1.4	0.8	1.2	2.4	**16.5**
2008	Chicago	**34**	**34**	32.9	.457	.143	.780	7.9	2.3	1.0	**1.3**	2.8	16.3
2009	Chicago	**34**	**34**	**34.9**	.429	**.387**	.785	7.9	2.2	1.0	1.2	2.3	15.7
2010	Phoenix	**34**	**34**	29.8	**.664**°	.000	**.936**	7.6	1.3	1.0	0.8	1.9	15.7
2011	Phoenix	**34**	**34**	31.6	.548	.167	.852	**8.2**	1.8	0.5	0.7	1.9	14.6
2012	Phoenix	13	12	26.5	.483	.000	.811	4.8	1.3	0.6	0.5	2.0	13.2
2013	Phoenix	32	32	33.0	.515	.000	.897	6.4	1.9	1.0	0.4	2.0	15.2
2014^{†}	Phoenix	**34**	**34**	31.2	.533	.000	.849	7.6	2.4	0.8	0.5	1.4	14.5
2015	Phoenix	33	33	31.2	.512	.000	.802	5.1	1.7	1.0	0.3	1.4	14.1
2016	Phoenix	32	32	29.1	.541	.000	.792	5.3	1.9	0.8	0.1	**1.0**	11.3
2017	Indiana	33	33	31.8	.494	.000	.882	5.8	1.6	0.9	0.4	1.3	15.0
2018	Indiana	32	32	31.4	.488	.000	.819	6.4	1.7	0.9	0.3	1.6	14.2
2019	Indiana	**34**	**34**	30.7	.472	.000	.839	5.0	**2.5**	0.4	0.6	1.5	11.6
2020	Indiana	22	22	30.2	.462	.167	.854	5.7	**2.5**	0.7	0.4	1.3	12.5
Career		468	464	31.4	.497	.250	.821	6.6	1.9	0.9	0.7	1.8	14.4

=== WNBA Postseason ===
Year	Team	GP	GS	MPG	FG%	3P%	FT%	RPG	APG	SPG	BPG	TO	PPG
2010	Phoenix	4	4	32.3	.630	.000	.938	**8.3**	1.3	**1.5**	0.7	**0.5**	**20.8**
2011	Phoenix	5	5	32.6	.603	.000	.875	5.6	0.6	0.6	**0.8**	2.0	15.4
2013	Phoenix	5	5	34.0	.493	.000	.833	6.4	**2.0**	0.4	0.2	2.0	15.0
2014^{†}	Phoenix	**8**	**8**	**34.2**	**.663**	.000	.900	5.5	1.1	**1.5**	0.5	2.1	16.4
2015	Phoenix	4	4	30.4	.452	.000	.750	5.3	1.5	1.2	0.0	1.0	11.0
2016	Phoenix	5	5	31.3	.488	.000	**1.000**	3.8	1.8	0.6	0.2	1.4	9.6
Career		31	31	32.7	.569	.000	.889	5.7	1.4	1.0	0.4	1.6	14.8

== See also ==
- List of WNBA career rebounding leaders
