= 2007 Detroit Shock season =

- Head coach: Bill Laimbeer
- Arena: The Palace of Auburn Hills

Results
- Record: 24–10 (.706)
- Place: 1st (Eastern)
- Playoff finish: Lost WNBA Finals

The 2007 WNBA season was the tenth for the Detroit Shock. The Shock qualified for the WNBA Finals for the second consecutive year, losing to the Phoenix Mercury in 5 games.

== Offseason ==
=== WNBA draft ===
Pick	Player	Nationality	School
11	Ivory Latta		

== Regular season ==
=== Season standings ===
Eastern Conference	W	L	PCT	GB	Home	Road	Conf.
Detroit Shock ^{x}	24	10	.706	–	12–5	12–5	14–6
Indiana Fever ^{x}	21	13	.618	3.0	12–5	9–8	12–8
Connecticut Sun ^{x}	18	16	.529	6.0	8–9	10–7	10–10
New York Liberty ^{x}	16	18	.471	8.0	10–7	6–11	10–10
Washington Mystics ^{o}	16	18	.471	8.0	8–9	8–9	8–12
Chicago Sky ^{o}	14	20	.412	10.0	6–11	8–9	6–14

=== Season schedule ===
Date	Opponent	Score	Result	Record
May 19	Sacramento	75–68	Win	1–0
May 22	Minnesota	85–75	Win	2–0
May 30	Washington	94–79	Win	3–0
June 2	@ Houston	77–71	Win	4–0
June 8	@ New York	67–57	Win	5–0
June 10	@ Connecticut	79–74	Win	6–0
June 15	Connecticut	75–72	Win	7–0
June 16	Indiana	67–77	Loss	7–1
June 18	@ Los Angeles	79–73	Win	8–1
June 20	@ Seattle	87–71	Win	9–1
June 22	@ Phoenix	87–84	Win	10–1
June 23	@ Sacramento	75–85	Loss	10–2
June 27	Connecticut	77–74	Win	11–2
June 29	@ Washington	64–65	Loss	11–3
July 1	San Antonio	68–71	Loss	11–4
July 6	New York	81–82	Loss	11–5
July 8	Phoenix	111–82	Win	12–5
July 10	Chicago	92–84	Win	13–5
July 12	@ Chicago	78–65	Win	14–5
July 18	New York	87–82	Win	15–5
July 20	@ Indiana	89–80	Win	16–5
July 21	Washington	66–58	Win	17–5
July 24	@ Connecticut	92–88	Win	18–5
July 26	Chicago	73–83	Loss	18–6
July 28	@ Washington	76–64	Win	19–6
July 29	Los Angeles	75–73	Win	20–6
July 31	@ San Antonio	84–79	Win	21–6
August 3	@ Chicago	66–60	Win	22–6
August 9	Seattle	97–70	Win	23–6
August 11	Indiana	74–69	Win	24–6
August 12	@ New York	84–85	Loss	24–7
August 14	Houston	73–81	Loss	24–8
August 16	@ Minnesota	77–87	Loss	24–9
August 19	@ Indiana	66–72	Loss	24–10
August 24 (first round, game 1)	@ New York	51–73	Loss	0–1
August 26 (first round, game 2)	New York	76–73	Win	1–1
August 28 (first round, game 3)	New York	71–70 (OT)	Win	2–1
August 31 (conference finals, game 1)	@ Indiana	65–75	Loss	2–2
September 2 (conference finals, game 2)	Indiana	77–63	Win	3–2
September 3 (conference finals, game 3)	Indiana	81–65	Win	4–2
September 5 (WNBA finals, game 1)	Phoenix	108–100	Win	5–2
September 8 (WNBA finals, game 2)	Phoenix	70–98	Loss	5–3
September 11 (WNBA finals, game 3)	@ Phoenix	88–83	Win	6–3
September 13 (WNBA finals, game 4)	@ Phoenix	76–77	Loss	6–4
September 16 (WNBA finals, game 5)	Phoenix	92–108	Loss	6–5

== Player stats ==
Note: GP= Games played; FG = Field Goals; MIN= Minutes; REB= Rebounds; AST= Assists; STL = Steals; BLK = Blocks; PTS = Points

Player	GP	MIN	FG	REB	AST	STL	BLK	PTS
Deanna Nolan	34	1175	221	148	132	49	12	553
Katie Smith								450
Plenette Pierson								396
Swin Cash								344
Kara Braxton								207
Cheryl Ford								195
Shannon Johnson								193
Katie Feenstra								177
Ivory Latta								93
Elaine Powell								60
Tausha Mills								15
Ayana Walker								7
Iciss Tillis								4
Amy Sanders								2
Tyresa Smith	1	7	0	2	0	1	0	1

== Playoffs ==
- Won WNBA Eastern Conference Semifinals (2–1) over New York Liberty
- Won WNBA Eastern Conference Finals (2–1) over Indiana Fever
- Lost WNBA Finals (3–2) to Phoenix Mercury
