= 2007 WNBA draft =

2007 meeting of WNBA teams to select players

General information
- Sport: Basketball
- Date(s): April 4, 2007
- Location: Cleveland, Ohio
- Network(s): ESPN2, NBATV, ESPNU

Overview
- League: WNBA
- Merging teams: Charlotte Sting (folded in 2006)
- First selection: Lindsey Harding; Minnesota Lynx

The 2007 WNBA draft was the league's annual process for determining which teams receive the rights to negotiate with players entering the league.

A lottery was held on October 26, 2006, among the teams with the worst records in the previous season to determine the order of the top six picks in the first round of the draft. As in the NBA draft, the teams' chances were weighted so that the team with the worst record, in this case the Chicago Sky, had the best chance of receiving the top pick. The lottery was used to determine only the top two picks, with picks 3 through 6 going to the other lottery teams in inverse order of record. The Phoenix Mercury, despite having the best record of the six teams involved and thus the worst mathematical chance of winning, drew the top pick. It was the first time since the institution of the lottery for the 2002 Draft that the top pick was earned by the team with the worst mathematical chance of winning. Also for the first time, the team with the second-worst odds of earning the top pick, in this case the San Antonio Silver Stars, received the second pick. The remaining first-round picks, plus all picks in the second and third rounds, are allocated in inverse order of regular-season record, without regard to playoff results (as in the NBA Draft).

The main draft was held on April 4, 2007, inside the Renaissance Hotel on Cleveland's Public Square, the day after the 2007 NCAA Women's Division I Basketball Tournament ended. This draft marked the first WNBA draft ever held outside of New Jersey.

Additionally, on January 8, 2007, the WNBA held a dispersal draft to re-assign players from the Charlotte Sting who folded at the end of 2006 WNBA season.

== Key ==
!	Denotes player who has been inducted to the Naismith Memorial Basketball Hall of Fame
^	Denotes player who has been inducted to the Women's Basketball Hall of Fame
^{+}	Denotes player who has been selected for at least one All-Star Game
^{#}	Denotes player who never played in the WNBA regular season or playoffs
**Bold**	Denotes player who won Rookie of the Year

== Draft ==
=== Round 1 ===
Pick	Player	Nationality	Team	School / club team
1	Lindsey Harding (traded to Minnesota)	United States	Phoenix Mercury	Duke
2	Jessica Davenport (traded to New York)	United States	San Antonio Silver Stars	Ohio State
3	**Armintie Price**	United States	Chicago Sky	Ole Miss
4	Noelle Quinn	United States	Minnesota Lynx	UCLA
5	Tiffany Jackson	United States	New York Liberty	Texas
6	Bernice Mosby	United States	Washington Mystics	Baylor
7	Katie Gearlds	United States	Seattle Storm	Purdue
8	Ashley Shields	United States	Houston Comets	Southwest Tennessee CC
9	Alison Bales	United States	Indiana Fever	Duke
10	Carla Thomas	United States	Chicago Sky (from Sacramento)	Vanderbilt
11	Ivory Latta ^{+}	United States	Detroit Shock	North Carolina
12	Kamesha Hairston	United States	Connecticut Sun (from Los Angeles)	Temple
13	Sandrine Gruda	France	Connecticut Sun	Valenciennes (France)

=== Round 2 ===
Pick	Player	Nationality	Team	School / club team
14	Dee Davis	United States	Houston Comets (from Chicago)	Vanderbilt
15	Shay Murphy	United States	Minnesota Lynx	USC
16	Shay Doron	Israel	New York Liberty	Maryland
17	Camille Little	United States	San Antonio Silver Stars	North Carolina
18	Tyresa Smith	United States	Phoenix Mercury	Delaware
19	Megan Vogel ^{#}	United States	Washington Mystics	South Dakota State
20	Stephanie Raymond	United States	Chicago Sky (from Seattle)	Northern Illinois
21	Jessica Dickson ^{#}	United States	Chicago Sky (from Houston)	South Florida
22	Lyndsey Medders ^{#}	United States	Indiana Fever	Iowa State
23	Brooke Smith	United States	Sacramento Monarchs	Stanford
24	Kathrin Ress	Italy	Minnesota Lynx (from Detroit)	Boston College
25	Sidney Spencer	United States	Los Angeles Sparks	Tennessee
26	Cori Chambers	United States	Connecticut Sun	Georgia

=== Round 3 ===
Pick	Player	Nationality	Team	School / club team
27	Jenna Rubino ^{#}	United States	Chicago Sky	DePaul
28	Leah Rush	United States	Phoenix Mercury (from Minnesota)	Oklahoma
29	Martina Weber	Germany	New York Liberty	Iona
30	Nare Diawara ^{#}	Mali	San Antonio Silver Stars	Virginia Tech
31	Chrissy Givens	United States	Phoenix Mercury	Middle Tennessee
32	Gillian Goring	Trinidad and Tobago	Washington Mystics	North Carolina State
33	Brandie Hoskins ^{#}	United States	Seattle Storm	Ohio State
34	Kristen Newlin ^{#}	United States	Houston Comets	Stanford
35	Ashley Key ^{#}	United States	Indiana Fever	North Carolina State
36	Meg Bulger ^{#}	United States	Sacramento Monarchs	West Virginia
37	Emily Westerberg ^{#}	United States	Phoenix Mercury (from Detroit)	Arizona State
38	Amanda Brown ^{#}	Canada	Los Angeles Sparks	Penn State
39	Kiera Hardy ^{#}	United States	Connecticut Sun	Nebraska

== See also ==
- List of first overall WNBA draft picks
