= 2007 WNBA season =

- League: Women's National Basketball Association
- Sport: Basketball
- Duration: May 19 – September 16, 2007
- Games: 34
- Teams: 13
- Total attendance: 1,727,939
- Average attendance: 7,819
- TV partner(s): ABC, ESPN, NBA TV

Draft
- Top draft pick: (United States) Lindsey Harding
- Picked by: Minnesota Lynx

Regular season
- Top seed: Detroit Shock
- Season MVP: (Australia) Lauren Jackson (Seattle)
- Top scorer: (Australia) Lauren Jackson (Seattle)

Playoffs
- Finals champions: Phoenix Mercury
- Runners-up: Detroit Shock
- Finals MVP: (United States) Cappie Pondexter (Phoenix)

WNBA seasons
- ← 2006 2008 →

The 2007 WNBA season was the Women's National Basketball Association's 11th season. On January 3, 2007 The Charlotte Sting folded. Three months later on April 4, the WNBA held their annual draft in Cleveland, Ohio. Lindsey Harding of Duke University was selected number one by the Phoenix Mercury. The Duke point guard was traded later to the Minnesota Lynx for Tangela Smith. The San Antonio Silver Stars selected Ohio State University center, Jessica Davenport. Davenport was traded to the New York Liberty for Becky Hammon. The season kicked off on May 19, with a rematch of the 2006 WNBA Finals between the Sacramento Monarchs and the Detroit Shock. The Shock defeated the Monarchs 75-68. On July 15 The All Star Game was played at the Verizon Center in Washington D.C. The Eastern All Stars defeated the Western All Stars 103-99. Detroit Shock center, Cheryl Ford won the MVP of the game. Playing 27 minutes contributing 16 points, 13 rebounds, and 5 assists for the Eastern All Stars victory. The 2007 WNBA regular season ended on August 19. Lauren Jackson of the Seattle Storm was named league MVP. Dan Hughes of the San Antonio Silver Stars was named Coach of the Year. Armintie Price of the Chicago Sky was named Rookie of The Year. The 2007 WNBA season officially ended on September 16 when the Phoenix Mercury won the season WNBA Championship. The Mercury defeated the Detroit Shock 3 games to 2. Mercury guard Cappie Pondexter was named Finals MVP.

== Charlotte Sting dispersal draft ==
On January 8, 2007, the Charlotte Sting dispersal draft was held after the team folded in December 2006. The remaining thirteen active teams in the WNBA each selected one player from the 2006 Sting roster in the one-round draft. Teams drafted in inverse order of their 2006 regular season finish. All Sting players were available except for unrestricted free agents, Allison Feaster and Tammy Sutton-Brown. Two players from the Sting, Tasha Butts and Summer Erb, were not selected in the dispersal draft and became free agents on January 15.

The top four picks were:

Pick	Player	Nationality	New Team	Ref.
1	Monique Currie	United States	Chicago Sky	
2	Tangela Smith	United States	Minnesota Lynx	
3	Janel McCarville	United States	New York Liberty	
4	Helen Darling	United States	San Antonio Silver Stars	

== Regular season ==
=== Standings ===
Eastern Conference

Eastern Conference	W	L	PCT	GB	Home	Road	Conf.
Detroit Shock ^{x}	24	10	.706	–	12–5	12–5	14–6
Indiana Fever ^{x}	21	13	.618	3.0	12–5	9–8	12–8
Connecticut Sun ^{x}	18	16	.529	6.0	8–9	10–7	10–10
New York Liberty ^{x}	16	18	.471	8.0	10–7	6–11	10–10
Washington Mystics ^{o}	16	18	.471	8.0	8–9	8–9	8–12
Chicago Sky ^{o}	14	20	.412	10.0	6–11	8–9	6–14

Western Conference

Western Conference	W	L	PCT	GB	Home	Road	Conf.
Phoenix Mercury ^{x}	23	11	.676	–	12–5	11–6	17–5
San Antonio Silver Stars ^{x}	20	14	.588	3.0	9–8	11–6	13–9
Sacramento Monarchs ^{x}	19	15	.559	4.0	12–5	7–10	12–10
Seattle Storm ^{x}	17	17	.500	6.0	12–5	5–12	11–11
Houston Comets ^{o}	13	21	.382	10.0	7–10	6–11	10–12
Minnesota Lynx ^{o}	10	24	.294	13.0	7–10	3–14	8–14
Los Angeles Sparks ^{o}	10	24	.294	13.0	5–12	5–12	6–16

== Playoffs ==
This was the outlook for the 2007 WNBA playoffs. Teams in italics had home court advantage. Teams in bold advanced to the next round. Numbers to the left of each team indicate the team's original playoffs seeding in their respective conferences. Numbers to the right of each team indicate the number of games the team won in that round.

**First Round**; Best-of-3
1	**Detroit**	2
4	New York	1
**Eastern Conference**
2	**Indiana**	2
3	Connecticut	1
1	**Phoenix**	2
4	Seattle	0
**Western Conference**
2	**San Antonio**	2
3	Sacramento	1

**Conference Finals**; Best-of-3
1	**Detroit**	2
2	Indiana	1
1	**Phoenix**	2
2	San Antonio	0

**WNBA Finals**; Best-of-5
1	Detroit	2
1	**Phoenix**	3

- **Bold** – series winner
- Italic – team with home court advantage

== Awards ==
=== Individual ===
Award		Winner	Team
Most Valuable Player (MVP)		Lauren Jackson	Seattle Storm
Finals MVP		Cappie Pondexter	Phoenix Mercury
Defensive Player of the Year		Lauren Jackson	Seattle Storm
Most Improved Player		Janel McCarville	New York Liberty
Peak Performers	**Scoring**	Lauren Jackson	Seattle Storm
Peak Performers	**Rebounding**	Lauren Jackson	Seattle Storm
Peak Performers	**Assists**	Becky Hammon	San Antonio Silver Stars
Sixth Woman of the Year		Plenette Pierson	Detroit Shock
Rookie of the Year		Armintie Price	Chicago Sky
Kim Perrot Sportsmanship Award		Tully Bevilaqua	Indiana Fever
Coach of the Year		Dan Hughes	San Antonio Silver Stars

=== Team ===
Award		Player	Team
All-WNBA	First Team	Lauren Jackson	Seattle Storm
All-WNBA	First Team	Becky Hammon	San Antonio Silver Stars
All-WNBA	First Team	Diana Taurasi	Phoenix Mercury
All-WNBA	First Team	Deanna Nolan	Detroit Shock
All-WNBA	First Team	Penny Taylor	Phoenix Mercury
All-WNBA	Second Team	Tamika Catchings	Indiana Fever
All-WNBA	Second Team	Katie Douglas	Connecticut Sun
All-WNBA	Second Team	Tina Thompson	Houston Comets
All-WNBA	Second Team	Seimone Augustus	Minnesota Lynx
All-WNBA	Second Team	Sophia Young	San Antonio Silver Stars
All-Defensive	First Team	Tamika Catchings	Indiana Fever
All-Defensive	First Team	Lauren Jackson	Seattle Storm
All-Defensive	First Team	Katie Douglas	Connecticut Sun
All-Defensive	First Team	Alana Beard	Washington Mystics
All-Defensive	First Team	Deanna Nolan	Detroit Shock
All-Defensive	Second Team	Tully Bevilaqua	Indiana Fever
All-Defensive	Second Team	Rebekkah Brunson	Sacramento Monarchs
All-Defensive	Second Team	Margo Dydek	Connecticut Sun
All-Defensive	Second Team	Loree Moore	New York Liberty
All-Defensive	Second Team	Chelsea Newton	Sacramento Monarchs
All-Rookie Team		Armintie Price	Chicago Sky
All-Rookie Team		Sidney Spencer	Los Angeles Sparks
All-Rookie Team		Lindsey Harding	Minnesota Lynx
All-Rookie Team		Camille Little	San Antonio Silver Stars
All-Rookie Team		Marta Fernandez	Los Angeles Sparks

=== Players of the Week ===
Week ending	Eastern Conference		Western Conference	
Week ending	Player	Team	Player	Team
May 27	Erin Thorn	New York Liberty	Diana Taurasi	Phoenix Mercury
June 3	Asjha Jones	Connecticut Sun	Becky Hammon	San Antonio Silver Stars
June 10	Tamika Catchings	Indiana Fever	Rebekkah Brunson	Sacramento Monarchs
June 17	Candice Dupree	Chicago Sky	Lauren Jackson	Seattle Storm
June 25	Katie Smith	Detroit Shock	Becky Hammon (2)	San Antonio Silver Stars
July 2	Jia Perkins	Chicago Sky	Lauren Jackson (2)	Seattle Storm
July 9	Tamika Catchings (2)	Indiana Fever	Erin Buescher	San Antonio Silver Stars
July 23	Lindsay Whalen	Connecticut Sun	Lauren Jackson (3)	Seattle Storm
July 30	Katie Douglas	Connecticut Sun	Lauren Jackson (4)	Seattle Storm
August 6	Alana Beard	Washington Mystics	Diana Taurasi (2)	Phoenix Mercury
August 13	Deanna Nolan	Detroit Shock	Penny Taylor	Phoenix Mercury
August 20	Alana Beard (2)	Washington Mystics	Lauren Jackson (5)	Seattle Storm

== Coaches ==
=== Eastern Conference ===
- Chicago Sky: Bo Overton
- Connecticut Sun: Mike Thibault
- Detroit Shock: Bill Laimbeer
- Indiana Fever: Brian Winters
- New York Liberty: Pat Coyle
- Washington Mystics: Richie Adubato and Tree Rollins

=== Western Conference ===
- Houston Comets: Karleen Thompson
- Los Angeles Sparks: Michael Cooper
- Minnesota Lynx: Don Zierden
- Phoenix Mercury: Paul Westhead
- Sacramento Monarchs: Jenny Boucek
- San Antonio Silver Stars: Dan Hughes
- Seattle Storm: Anne Donovan
