= 2011 Phoenix Mercury season =

- Head coach: Corey Gaines
- Arena: US Airways Center

Results
- Record: 19–15 (.559)
- Place: 3rd (Western)
- Playoff finish: Lost in Conference Finals

Media
- Television: FS-A; ESPN2, NBATV

The 2011 WNBA season was the 15th season for the Phoenix Mercury of the Women's National Basketball Association.

== Transactions ==
=== WNBA draft ===
The following are the Mercury's selections in the 2011 WNBA draft.

Round	Pick	Player	Nationality	School/team/country
2	19	Brittany Spears	United States	Colorado
3	31	Tahnee Robinson	United States	Nevada

=== Transaction log ===
- February 9: The Mercury signed Brooke Smith, Sequoia Holmes, and Taylor Lilley to training camp contracts.
- February 22: The Mercury signed Lauren Ervin to a training camp contract.
- February 24: The Mercury signed Marie Ferdinand-Harris and Nakia Sanford.
- February 25: The Mercury signed Alexis Gray-Lawson and Amanda Thompson.
- March 14: The Mercury waived Sequoia Holmes and Brooke Smith.
- April 10: The Mercury signed Erlana Larkins to a training camp contract.
- April 11: The Mercury traded draft rights to Tahnee Robinson to the Connecticut Sun in exchange for a third-round pick in the 2012 draft.
- April 15: The Mercury waived Amanda Thompson.
- April 22: The Mercury signed Yuko Oga and Olayinka Sanni to training camp contracts.
- April 28: The Mercury waived Lauren Ervin.
- May 19: The Mercury waived Erlana Larkins.
- May 30: The Mercury waived Taylor Lilley and Brittany Spears.
- June 2: The Mercury waived Yuko Oga.
- August 4: The Mercury traded Kara Braxton to the New York Liberty in exchange for Sidney Spencer.
- August 12: The Mercury signed Krystal Thomas and waived Olayinka Sanni.

=== Trades ===
Date	Trade	
April 11, 2011	To Phoenix Mercury	To Connecticut Sun
April 11, 2011	third-round pick in 2012 draft	Tahnee Robinson
August 4, 2011	To Phoenix Mercury	To New York Liberty
August 4, 2011	Sidney Spencer	Kara Braxton

=== Personnel changes ===
==== Additions ====
Player	Signed	Former team
Marie Ferdinand-Harris	February 24, 2011	Los Angeles Sparks
Nakia Sanford	February 24, 2011	Washington Mystics
Alexis Gray-Lawson	February 25, 2011	free agent
Olayinka Sanni	April 20, 2011	free agent
Sidney Spencer	August 4, 2011	New York Liberty
Krystal Thomas	August 12, 2011	free agent

==== Subtractions ====
Player	Left	New team
Tangela Smith	February 2, 2011	Indiana Fever
Sequoia Holmes	March 14, 2011	free agent
Brooke Smith	March 14, 2011	free agent
Taylor Lilley	May 30, 2011	free agent
Kara Braxton	August 4, 2011	New York Liberty
Olayinka Sanni	August 12, 2011	free agent

== Roster ==
2011 Phoenix Mercury roster
Players
Coaches

Pos.	No.	Nat.	Name	Height	Weight	DOB	From	Yrs
G/F	24	(United States)	Bonner, DeWanna	6' 4" (1.93m)	137 lb (62kg)	1987-08-21	Auburn	2
F	4	(United States)	Dupree, Candice	6' 2" (1.88m)	175 lb (79kg)	1984-08-16	Temple	5
G	9	(United States)	Ferdinand-Harris, Marie	5' 9" (1.75m)	162 lb (73kg)	1978-10-13	LSU	9
G	21	(United States)	Gray-Lawson, Alexis	5' 8" (1.73m)	176 lb (80kg)	1987-04-21	California	R
G	2	(United States)	Johnson, Temeka	5' 3" (1.6m)	142 lb (64kg)	1982-09-06	LSU	6
F/C	43	(United States)	Sanford, Nakia	6' 4" (1.93m)	195 lb (88kg)	1976-05-10	Kansas	8
G/F	6	(United States)	Spencer, Sidney	6' 3" (1.91m)	183 lb (83kg)	1985-03-07	Tennessee	4
G	11	(United States)	Swanier, Ketia	5' 7" (1.7m)	150 lb (68kg)	1986-08-10	Connecticut	3
G	3	(United States)	Taurasi, Diana	6' 0" (1.83m)	163 lb (74kg)	1982-06-11	Connecticut	7
F	13	(Australia)	Taylor, Penny	6' 1" (1.85m)	165 lb (75kg)	1981-05-24	Australia	9
F/C	32	(United States)	Thomas, Krystal	6' 5" (1.96m)	195 lb (88kg)	1989-06-10	Duke	R

Head coach
(United States) Corey Gaines (Loyola Marymount)
Assistant coaches
(United States) Julie Hairgrove (Arizona)
(United States) Bridget Pettis (Florida)
Athletic trainer
(United States) Tamara Poole (Cal State Dominguez Hills)
Strength and conditioning coach
(United States) Ben Hadley (Arizona State)

Legend

- (C) Team captain
- (DP) Unsigned draft pick
- (FA) Free agent
- (S) Suspended
- Injured

=== Depth ===
Pos.	Starter	Bench
C	Nakia Sanford	Krystal Thomas
PF	Candice Dupree	DeWanna Bonner
SF	Penny Taylor	Marie Ferdinand-Harris; Sidney Spencer
SG	Diana Taurasi	Alexis Gray-Lawson
PG	Temeka Johnson	Ketia Swanier

== Season standings ==
Western Conference	W	L	PCT	GB	Home	Road	Conf.
Minnesota Lynx ^{x}	27	7	.794	–	14–3	13–4	18–4
Seattle Storm ^{x}	21	13	.618	6.0	15–2	6–11	15–7
Phoenix Mercury ^{x}	19	15	.559	8.0	11–6	8–9	11–11
San Antonio Silver Stars ^{x}	18	16	.529	9.0	9–8	9–8	11–11
Los Angeles Sparks ^{o}	15	19	.441	12.0	10–7	5–12	10–12
Tulsa Shock ^{o}	3	31	.088	24.0	2–15	1–16	1–21

== Schedule ==
=== Preseason ===
2011 Game Log: Preseason

Game	Date	Time (ET)	Opponent	Score	High points	High rebounds	High assists	Location/Attendance	Record
1	May 24	10:00pm	Japan	96–52	Gray-Lawson (16)	Dupree (8)	Gray Lawson (6)	US Airways Center; 2,969	1–0
2	May 28	10:00pm	@ Los Angeles	72–83	3 players (12)	Braxton (6)	5 players (2)	The Pit; N/A	1–1

=== Regular season ===
2011 Game Log: Regular Season
June

Game	Date	Time (ET)	Opponent	TV	Score	High points	High rebounds	High assists	Location/Attendance	Record
1	June 4	3:00pm	@ Seattle	ABC	71–78	Taurasi (31)	Dupree; Braxton (9)	Taylor (5)	KeyArena; 11,548	0–1
2	June 10	10:30pm	@ Los Angeles		85–98	Taylor (18)	Dupree (11)	Johnson (6)	Staples Center; 10,616	0–2
3	June 17	10:00pm	San Antonio	FS-A	99–101	Taurasi (20)	Dupree (12)	Taylor (10)	US Airways Center; 12,274	0–3
4	June 19	6:00pm	Indiana		93–89 (OT)	Taurasi (32)	Dupree (18)	Taylor (6)	US Airways Center; 7,701	1–3
5	June 21	8:00pm	@ San Antonio	ESPN2	105–98	Taylor (30)	Dupree (13)	Johnson (6)	AT&T Center; 7,072	2–3
6	June 24	7:30pm	@ Atlanta	FS-A; FS-S	92–83	Taurasi (20)	Taylor (10)	Taylor (8)	Philips Arena; 5,492	3–3
7	June 25	8:00pm	@ Chicago	CN100	86–78	Tauarsi (23)	Braxton; Taylor (9)	Taylor (7)	Allstate Arena; 5,547	4–3
8	June 28	7:00pm	@ Indiana		86–91	Bonner; Taurasi (15)	Braxton (7)	Gray-Lawson; Taylor (5)	Conseco Fieldhouse; 6,625	4–4

July

Game	Date	Time (ET)	Opponent	TV	Score	High points	High rebounds	High assists	Location/Attendance	Record
9	July 1	10:00pm	Chicago	NBATV; CN100	97–84	Taurasi (24)	Dupree (9)	Taurasi (6)	US Airways Center; 9,517	5–4
10	July 5	9:00pm	Los Angeles	ESPN2	101–82	Dupree; Taurasi (20)	Braxton (5)	Taurasi (7)	US Airways Center; 9,826	6–4
11	July 8	8:00pm	@ Tulsa		86–78	Taurasi (17)	Bonner (13)	Taylor (7)	BOK Center; 4,081	7–4
12	July 10	6:00pm	Tulsa	NBATV; COX	102–63	Taylor (18)	Sanford (7)	Taurasi (6)	US Airways Center; 7,696	8–4
13	July 13	1:00pm	@ Minnesota	NBATV; FS-A; FS-N	112–105	Taurasi (27)	Dupree; Taylor (8)	Johnson; Taurasi; Taylor (8)	Target Center; 11,820	9–4
14	July 15	10:00pm	Washington	NBATV; FS-A	78–64	Dupree (20)	Taylor (8)	Taylor (7)	US Airways Center; 9,075	10–4
15	July 20	3:30pm	Minnesota	NBATV; FS-A	98–106	Taurasi (24)	Bonner; Dupree (7)	Taurasi (6)	US Airways Center; 12,118	10–5
All-Star break
16	July 26	9:00pm	Seattle	NBATV	77–83	Taurasi (26)	Bonner; Braxton (7)	Johnson (5)	US Airways Center; 6,108	10–6
17	July 28	12:30pm	@ San Antonio	NBATV; FS-A; FS-SW	91–102	Taurasi (27)	Dupree (14)	Johnson; Taylor (5)	AT&T Center; 14,797	10–7
18	July 30	7:00pm	@ New York	NBATV; MSG+	91–84	Taylor (29)	Bonner (9)	Swanier (7)	Prudential Center; 7,214	11–7

August

Game	Date	Time (ET)	Opponent	TV	Score	High points	High rebounds	High assists	Location/Attendance	Record
19	August 2	8:00pm	@ Minnesota	ESPN2	73–90	Taurasi (20)	Bonner (8)	Johnson (4)	Target Center; 7,126	11–8
20	August 7	6:00pm	Connecticut	NBATV; FS-A	95–96 (OT)	Taurasi (29)	Dupree (12)	Taurasi (6)	US Airways Center; 8,514	11–9
21	August 9	10:00pm	Minnesota		85–80	Taurasi (26)	Dupree (11)	Johnson (5)	US Airways Center; 6,726	12–9
22	August 11	10:00pm	Atlanta		109–95	Bonner (25)	Bonner (13)	Taylor (6)	US Airways Center; 7,940	13–9
23	August 12	10:30pm	@ Los Angeles		90–93 (OT)	Taylor (29)	Bonner (10)	Johnson (12)	Staples Center; 10,512	13–10
24	August 16	10:00pm	Seattle		81–79	Taurasi (24)	Bonner; Sanford; Taurasi (5)	Johnson; Taurasi (4)	US Airways Center; 8,870	14–10
25	August 20	10:00pm	San Antonio	NBATV; FS-A; FS-SW	87–81	Taylor (28)	Bonner (11)	Taylor (5)	US Airways Center; 10,134	15–10
26	August 23	10:00pm	New York	ESPN2	70–74	Dupree (17)	Taylor (9)	Johnson; Taylor (4)	US Airways Center; 8,871	15–11
27	August 26	7:30pm	@ Connecticut	CSN-NE	92–95	Taurasi; Taylor (26)	Dupree; Sanford (11)	Johnson (7)	Mohegan Sun Arena; 9,007	15–12
28	August 28	4:00pm	@ Washington	NBATV; CSN-MA	86–79	Dupree (27)	Sanford (9)	Johnson (8)	Verizon Center; 11,614	16–12
29	August 30	8:00pm	@ Tulsa		96–74	Bonner (25)	Bonner; Sanford (9)	Bonner; Taurasi (3)	BOK Center; 3,590	17–12

September

Game	Date	Time (ET)	Opponent	TV	Score	High points	High rebounds	High assists	Location/Attendance	Record
30	September 1	8:00pm	@ San Antonio		68–86	Bonner (23)	Dupree (13)	Swanier; Taurasi (3)	AT&T Center; 6,502	17–13
31	September 3	10:00pm	Los Angeles	NBATV	93–77	Taurasi (24)	Dupree (19)	Johnson (9)	US Airways Center; 9,620	18–13
32	September 8	10:00pm	Tulsa	NBATV; COX	91–76	Taurasi (21)	Bonner (10)	Swanier (9)	US Airways Center; 8,189	19–13
33	September 9	10:00pm	@ Seattle	KONG	70–85	Taurasi (36)	Bonner (14)	Johnson (3)	KeyArena; 9,686	19–14
34	September 11	6:00pm	Minnesota	FS-A	90–96	Taurasi (19)	Dupree (6)	Swanier (4)	US Airways Center; 12,666	19–15

All games are viewable on WNBA LiveAccess or ESPN3.com

=== Postseason ===
2011 Game Log: Postseason
Western Conference Semifinals

Game	Date	Time (ET)	Opponent	TV	Score	High points	High rebounds	High assists	Location/Attendance	Series
1	September 15	10:00pm	@ Seattle	ESPN2	61–80	Taylor (13)	Bonner (8)	Johnson; Swanier; Taylor (3)	KeyArena; 7,279	0–1
2	September 17	10:00pm	Seattle	NBATV	92–83	Dupree (29)	Dupree (13)	Johnson (9)	US Airways Center; 9,356	1–1
3	September 19	10:00pm	@ Seattle	ESPN2	77–75	Dupree (20)	Taylor (17)	Johnson; Taurasi (3)	KeyArena; 8,589	2–1

Western Conference Finals

Game	Date	Time (ET)	Opponent	TV	Score	High points	High rebounds	High assists	Location/Attendance	Series
1	September 22	9:00pm	@ Minnesota	ESPN2	67–95	Taurasi (22)	Bonner (8)	Johnson (4)	Target Center; 8,912	0–1
2	September 25	5:00pm	Minnesota	ESPN2	86–103	Bonner; Taurasi (22)	Dupree (11)	Johnson (6)	US Airways Center; 8,617	0–2

== Statistics ==
Legend
GP	Games played	GS	Games started	MPG	Minutes per game	RPG	Rebounds per game
APG	Assists per game	SPG	Steals per game	BPG	Blocks per game	PPG	Points per game
FG%	Field-goal percentage	3P%	3-point field-goal percentage	FT%	Free-throw percentage	TO	Turnovers per game
PF	Fouls per game		Team leader		League leader

=== Regular season ===
Player	GP	GS	MPG	FG%	3P%	FT%	RPG	APG	SPG	BPG	PPG
DeWanna Bonner	34	5	25.2	.430	.343	.909	7.0	0.8	1.00	1.06	10.7
Kara Braxton	18	18	19.8	.559	.500	.595	4.9	1.3	0.80	0.80	10.6
Candice Dupree	34	34	31.6	.548	.167	.852	8.2	1.8	0.56	0.74	14.6
Marie Ferdinand-Harris	34	2	17.4	.335	.333	.974	1.5	1.1	0.56	0.21	6.8
Alexis Gray-Lawson	27	0	11.4	.398	.349	.821	0.7	1.3	0.22	0.00	3.9
Temeka Johnson	30	30	23.9	.435	.385	.864	2.0	4.4	0.80	0.17	6.4
Nakia Sanford	33	16	14.4	.484	.000	.750	4.2	0.4	0.21	0.21	4.2
Olayinka Sanni	14	0	5.2	.667	.000	.333	0.7	0.0	0.21	0.07	1.6
Sidney Spencer	8	0	8.1	.313	.750	1.000	0.6	0.8	0.00	0.00	1.9
Ketia Swanier	29	4	14.8	.342	.286	.688	1.9	2.3	0.79	0.03	2.7
Diana Taurasi	32	32	30.2	.449	.395	.903	3.2	3.6	0.75	0.63	21.6
Penny Taylor	29	29	29.8	.511	.402	.874	4.9	4.7	1.69	0.38	16.7
Krystal Thomas	8	0	12.3	.563	.000	.500	1.0	0.1	0.00	0.63	2.6

== Awards and honors ==
- Candice Dupree was named WNBA Western Conference Player of the Week for the week of June 13, 2011.
- Penny Taylor was named WNBA Western Conference Player of the Week for the week of June 20, 2011.
- Diana Taurasi was named WNBA Western Conference Player of the Week for the week of August 8, 2011.
- DeWanna Bonner was named WNBA Western Conference Player of the Week for the week of August 29, 2011.
- Diana Taurasi was named to the 2011 WNBA All-Star Team as a starter.
- Penny Taylor was named to the 2011 WNBA All-Star Team as a reserve.
- Diana Taurasi finished as a Peak Performer, averaging 21.6 points per game.
- DeWanna Bonner was named Sixth Woman of the Year.
- Diana Taurasi was named to the All-WNBA First Team.
- Penny Taylor was named to the All-WNBA Second Team.
