= 2010 Phoenix Mercury season =

- Head coach: Corey Gaines
- Arena: US Airways Center

Results
- Record: 15–19 (.441)
- Place: 2nd (Western)
- Playoff finish: Lost Conference Finals

Media
- Television: FS-A; NBATV, ESPN2

The 2010 WNBA season was the 14th season for the Phoenix Mercury of the Women's National Basketball Association.

== Transactions ==
=== Dispersal draft ===
Based on the Mercury's 2009 record, they would pick 12th in the Sacramento Monarchs dispersal draft. The Mercury waived their pick.

=== WNBA draft ===
The following are the Mercury's selections in the 2010 WNBA draft.

| Round | Pick | Player | Nationality | School/team/country |
|---|---|---|---|---|
| 2 | 24 | Tyra Grant | United States | Penn State |
| 3 | 26 | Nyeshia Stevenson | United States | Oklahoma |

=== Transaction log ===
- March 26, 2009: The Mercury traded their first round pick in the 2010 draft to the Los Angeles Sparks in return for Temeka Johnson.
- February 9: The Mercury signed Brooke Smith to a training camp contract.
- February 26: The Mercury signed Ashley Paris to a training camp contract.
- March 17: The Mercury signed Lanae Williams to a training camp contract.
- March 30: The Mercury traded Cappie Pondexter and Kelly Mazzante to the New York Liberty in exchange for Candice Dupree from the Chicago Sky, as part of a three-team trade.
- April 16: The Mercury re-signed Penny Taylor and Temeka Johnson.
- May 3: The Mercury waived Tyra Grant.
- May 11: The Mercury waived Nyeshia Stevenson and Ashley Paris.
- May 13: The Mercury waived Lanae Williams and Yuko Oga.
- July 23: The Mercury traded Nicole Ohlde and a first-round pick in the 2011 Draft to the Tulsa Shock in exchange for Kara Braxton.

=== Trades ===
| Date | Trade | |
|---|---|---|
| March 26, 2009 | To Phoenix Mercury | To Los Angeles Sparks |
| March 26, 2009 | Temeka Johnson | first round pick in 2010 draft |
| March 30, 2010 | To Phoenix Mercury | To New York Liberty |
| March 30, 2010 | Candice Dupree (from Chi.) | Cappie Pondexter and Kelly Mazzante |
| July 23, 2010 | To Phoenix Mercury | To Tulsa Shock |
| July 23, 2010 | Kara Braxton | Nicole Ohlde and a first-round pick in 2011 Draft |

=== Free agents ===
==== Additions ====
| Player | Signed | Former team |
| Brooke Smith | February 9, 2010 | re-signed |
| Candice Dupree | March 30, 2010 | Chicago Sky |
| Penny Taylor | April 16, 2010 | re-signed |
| Temeka Johnson | April 16, 2010 | re-signed |
| Sequoia Holmes | May 15, 2010 | free agent |
| Taylor Lilley | May 15, 2010 | free agent |
| Kara Braxton | July 23, 2010 | Tulsa Shock |

==== Subtractions ====
| Player | Left | New team |
| Le'coe Willingham | February 9, 2010 | Seattle Storm |
| Cappie Pondexter | March 30, 2010 | New York Liberty |
| Kelly Mazzante | March 30, 2010 | New York Liberty |
| Nicole Ohlde | July 23, 2010 | Tulsa Shock |

== Roster ==
2010 Phoenix Mercury roster
Players
Coaches

| Pos. | No. | Nat. | Name | Height | Weight | From |
|---|---|---|---|---|---|---|
| G | 24 | (United States) | Bonner, DeWanna | 6' 4" (1.93m) | 136 lb (62kg) | Auburn |
| C | 45 | (United States) | Braxton, Kara | 6' 6" (1.98m) | 190 lb (86kg) | Georgia |
| F/C | 4 | (United States) | Dupree, Candice | 6' 2" (1.88m) | 162 lb (73kg) | Temple |
| G | 17 | (United States) | Holmes, Sequoia | 6' 1" (1.85m) | 155 lb (70kg) | Nevada |
| PG | 2 | (United States) | Johnson, Temeka | 5' 3" (1.6m) | 132 lb (60kg) | LSU |
| G | 23 | (United States) | Lilley, Taylor | 5' 6" (1.68m) | 130 lb (59kg) | Oregon |
| F/C | 21 | (United States) | Smith, Brooke | 6' 3" (1.91m) | 195 lb (88kg) | Stanford |
| C | 50 | (United States) | Smith, Tangela | 6' 4" (1.93m) | 160 lb (73kg) | Iowa |
| PG | 11 | (United States) | Swanier, Ketia | 5' 7" (1.7m) | 144 lb (65kg) | Connecticut |
| F | 13 | (Australia) | Taylor, Penny | 6' 1" (1.85m) | 163 lb (74kg) | Australia |
| G/F | 3 | (United States) | Taurasi, Diana | 6' 0" (1.83m) | 172 lb (78kg) | Connecticut |

Head coach
(United States) Corey Gaines (Loyola Marymount)
Assistant coaches
(United States) Julie Hairgrove (Arizona)
(United States) Bridget Pettis (Florida)
Athletic trainer
(United States) Tamara Poole (Cal State Dominguez Hills)
Strength and conditioning coach
(United States) Ben Hadley

Legend

- (C) Team captain
- (DP) Unsigned draft pick
- (FA) Free agent
- (S) Suspended
- Injured

WNBA roster page

=== Depth ===
| Pos. | Starter | Bench |
|---|---|---|
| C | Tangela Smith | Brooke Smith |
| PF | Candice Dupree | Kara Braxton |
| SF | Penny Taylor | DeWanna Bonner / Sequoia Holmes |
| SG | Diana Taurasi | Taylor Lilley |
| PG | Temeka Johnson | Ketia Swanier |

== Season standings ==
| Western Conference | W | L | PCT | GB | Home | Road | Conf. |
|---|---|---|---|---|---|---|---|
| Seattle Storm ^{x} | 28 | 6 | .824 | – | 17–0 | 11–6 | 20–2 |
| Phoenix Mercury ^{x} | 15 | 19 | .441 | 13.0 | 9–8 | 6–11 | 13–9 |
| San Antonio Silver Stars ^{x} | 14 | 20 | .412 | 14.0 | 8–9 | 6–11 | 11–11 |
| Los Angeles Sparks ^{x} | 13 | 21 | .382 | 15.0 | 8–9 | 5–12 | 10–12 |
| Minnesota Lynx ^{o} | 13 | 21 | .382 | 15.0 | 7–10 | 6–11 | 8–14 |
| Tulsa Shock ^{o} | 6 | 28 | .176 | 22.0 | 4–13 | 2–15 | 4–18 |

== Schedule ==
=== Preseason ===
2010 Game Log: Preseason

| Game | Date | Time (ET) | Opponent | Score | High points | High rebounds | High assists | Location/Attendance | Record |
|---|---|---|---|---|---|---|---|---|---|
| 1 | May 2 | 4:00pm | @ Seattle | 58-77 | Williams (19) | Paris (9) | Stevenson, Williams (2) | KeyArena; 4,912 | 0-1 |
| 2 | May 8 | 10:00pm | China National Team | 106-78 | Johnson (21) | Bonner (7) | Swanier (7) | US Airways Center; 2,393 | 1-1 |

=== Regular season ===
2010 Game Log: Regular Season
May

| Game | Date | Time (ET) | Opponent | TV | Score | High points | High rebounds | High assists | Location/Attendance | Record |
|---|---|---|---|---|---|---|---|---|---|---|
| 1 | May 15 | 2:00pm | Los Angeles | ESPN2 | 78-77 | Dupree (17) | Dupree (10) | Taurasi, Johnson (3) | US Airways Center; 14,772 | 1-0 |
| 2 | May 22 | 10:00pm | Seattle | | 89-95 (OT) | Bonner (24) | Bonner (12) | Johnson, Taylor (5) | US Airways Center; 10,144 | 1-1 |
| 3 | May 25 | 7:00pm | @ Tulsa | ESPN2 | 110-96 | Taurasi (35) | Dupree (14) | Taylor (7) | BOK Center; 4,100 | 2-1 |
| 4 | May 28 | 10:00pm | Atlanta | | 93-96 | Taurasi (30) | Bonner (13) | Taylor (7) | US Airways Center; 7,986 | 2-2 |

June

| Game | Date | Time (ET) | Opponent | TV | Score | High points | High rebounds | High assists | Location/Attendance | Record |
|---|---|---|---|---|---|---|---|---|---|---|
| 5 | June 1 | 7:30pm | @ Minnesota | ESPN2 | 82-92 | Taurasi (21) | Dupree (9) | Johnson (5) | Target Center; 6,854 | 2-3 |
| 6 | June 4 | 10:00pm | Los Angeles | | 90-89 | Bonner (24) | Dupree (8) | Johnson (5) | US Airways Center; 6,485 | 3-3 |
| 7 | June 6 | 9:00pm | @ Seattle | KONG | 74-97 | Bonner (12) | T. Smith (8) | Taylor (6) | KeyArena; 7,827 | 3-4 |
| 8 | June 8 | 10:30pm | @ Los Angeles | PRIME | 91-92 | Taurasi (21) | T. Smith (9) | Johnson, Taylor (9) | STAPLES Center; 7,993 | 3-5 |
| 9 | June 10 | 10:00pm | Minnesota | FS-A | 99-88 | Taurasi (31) | Dupree (8) | Johnson (8) | US Airways Center; 5,504 | 4-5 |
| 10 | June 12 | 10:00pm | Tulsa | | 116-84 | Dupree, Taurasi (18) | Bonner (7) | Taylor (8) | US Airways Center; 6,580 | 5-5 |
| 11 | June 18 | 10:00pm | San Antonio | | 105-108 | Taurasi (39) | Dupree (11) | Johnson, Taurasi (7) | US Airways Center; 6,147 | 5-6 |
| 12 | June 20 | 6:00pm | Connecticut | NBATV; FS-A | 94-96 | Taurasi (24) | Ohlde (7) | Taylor (4) | US Airways Center; 6,068 | 5-7 |
| 13 | June 25 | 7:30pm | @ Connecticut | CSN-NE | 79-82 | Taurasi (26) | Bonner (10) | Taurasi (6) | Mohegan Sun Arena; 9,518 | 5-8 |
| 14 | June 27 | 4:00pm | @ Washington | NBATV; CSN-MA | 85-95 | Taurasi (18) | Dupree (9) | Taurasi (4) | Verizon Center; 7,547 | 5-9 |
| 15 | June 29 | 7:00pm | @ Atlanta | SSO | 88-94 | Taylor (31) | Bonner (9) | Johnson (12) | Philips Arena; 4,073 | 5-10 |

July

| Game | Date | Time (ET) | Opponent | TV | Score | High points | High rebounds | High assists | Location/Attendance | Record |
|---|---|---|---|---|---|---|---|---|---|---|
| 16 | July 1 | 10:00pm | Washington | FS-A | 104-107 | Dupree, Taylor (23) | Dupree (9) | Johnson (11) | US Airways Center; 5,509 | 5-11 |
| 17 | July 3 | 10:00pm | New York | | 97-82 | Dupree (24) | T. Smith (10) | Taurasi (5) | US Airways Center; 6,780 | 6-11 |
| 18 | July 6 | 10:00pm | @ Los Angeles | ESPN2 | 98-89 | Taurasi (30) | Dupree (12) | Taurasi (7) | STAPLES Center; 8,336 | 7-11 |
| 19 | July 14 | 3:30pm | Seattle | FS-A | 107-111 (3OT) | Taurasi (44) | Dupree (14) | Taruasi, Taylor (4) | US Airways Center; 13,508 | 7-12 |
| 20 | July 17 | 10:00pm | Tulsa | | 97-88 | Taylor (29) | Taurasi (7) | Taurasi (8) | US Airways Center; 8,564 | 8-12 |
| 21 | July 22 | 8:00pm | @ Tulsa | COX | 123-91 | Taurasi (26) | Bonner (7) | Johnson (7) | BOK Center; 3,333 | 9-12 |
| 22 | July 24 | 8:00pm | @ Minnesota | NBATV; FS-N | 127-124 (2OT) | Dupree (32) | Dupree (16) | Johnson (9) | Target Center; 8,518 | 10-12 |
| 23 | July 27 | 9:30pm | @ Seattle | ESPN2 | 85-91 | Taurasi (27) | Taylor (7) | Taurasi, Taylor (6) | KeyArena; 8,044 | 10-13 |
| 24 | July 29 | 10:00pm | Minnesota | | 110-92 | Taylor (22) | Dupree, T. Smith (8) | Johnson (8) | US Airways Center; 7,037 | 11-13 |

August

| Game | Date | Time (ET) | Opponent | TV | Score | High points | High rebounds | High assists | Location/Attendance | Record |
|---|---|---|---|---|---|---|---|---|---|---|
| 25 | August 1 | 6:00pm | Chicago | NBATV; FS-A; CN100 | 97-96 | Taurasi (35) | Bonner, Braxton, Dupree (6) | Taurasi (11) | US Airways Center; 11,237 | 12-13 |
| 26 | August 3 | 8:00pm | @ San Antonio | | 103-92 | Dupree (24) | Dupree (12) | Taurasi (10) | AT&T Center; 6,116 | 13-13 |
| 27 | August 6 | 10:00pm | San Antonio | | 103-87 | T. Smith, Taylor (18) | Braxton (7) | Taylor (8) | US Airways Center; 12,909 | 14-13 |
| 28 | August 8 | 6:00pm | Indiana | | 82-104 | Taurasi (21) | Dupree (6) | Taurasi (7) | US Airways Center; 10,995 | 14-14 |
| 29 | August 10 | 8:00pm | @ Chicago | | 82-91 | Taurasi (28) | T. Smith (10) | Taylor (7) | Allstate Arena; 4,089 | 14-15 |
| 30 | August 13 | 7:00pm | @ Indiana | | 90-110 | Johnson (23) | Braxton, Taylor (6) | Taurasi (4) | Conseco Fieldhouse; 10,002 | 14-16 |
| 31 | August 14 | 7:30pm | @ New York | NBATV; MSG | 69-107 | Bonner (20) | Braxton, Dupree (8) | Johnson (4) | Madison Square Garden; 9,645 | 14-17 |
| 32 | August 17 | 10:30pm | @ Los Angeles | NBATV; PRIME | 90-84 | Braxton (16) | Dupree, Taylor (11) | Taylor (7) | STAPLES Center; 8,817 | 15-17 |
| 33 | August 20 | 7:00pm | Seattle | | 71-78 | Braxton (15) | Bonner (7) | Bonner (4) | US Airways Center; 12,459 | 15-18 |
| 34 | August 22 | 3:00pm | @ San Antonio | | 82-83 | Bonner (20) | Bonner (12) | Bonner, Lilley, Swanier (3) | AT&T Center; 8,331 | 15-19 |

All games are viewable on WNBA LiveAccess

=== Postseason ===
2010 Game Log: Postseason
Western Conference Semifinals

| Game | Date | Time (ET) | Opponent | TV | Score | High points | High rebounds | High assists | Location/Attendance | Series |
|---|---|---|---|---|---|---|---|---|---|---|
| 1 | August 26 | 9:00pm | San Antonio | ESPN2 | 106-93 | Dupree (32) | Dupree (8) | Taurasi (10) | US Airways Center; 8,927 | 1-0 |
| 2 | August 28 | 1:00pm | @ San Antonio | ESPN2 | 92-73 | Taurasi (23) | Dupree (11) | Taylor (12) | AT&T Center; 6,763 | 2-0 |

Western Conference Finals

| Game | Date | Time (ET) | Opponent | TV | Score | High points | High rebounds | High assists | Location/Attendance | Series |
|---|---|---|---|---|---|---|---|---|---|---|
| 1 | September 2 | 10:00pm | @ Seattle | NBATV | 74-82 | Taylor (16) | Dupree (11) | Johnson (7) | KeyArena; 9,686 | 0-1 |
| 2 | September 5 | 3:00pm | Seattle | ABC | 88-91 | Taurasi (28) | T. Smith (7) | Johnson (12) | US Airways Center; 9,010 | 0-2 |

== Statistics ==
Legend
| GP | Games played | GS | Games started | MPG | Minutes per game | RPG | Rebounds per game |
| APG | Assists per game | SPG | Steals per game | BPG | Blocks per game | PPG | Points per game |
| FG% | Field-goal percentage | 3P% | 3-point field-goal percentage | FT% | Free-throw percentage | TO | Turnovers per game |
| PF | Fouls per game | | Team leader | | League leader |

=== Regular season ===
| Player | GP | GS | MPG | FG% | 3P% | FT% | RPG | APG | SPG | BPG | PPG |
|---|---|---|---|---|---|---|---|---|---|---|---|
| DeWanna Bonner | 32 | 4 | 25.4 | .465 | .358 | .840 | 6.1 | 1.3 | 0.69 | 1.16 | 12.0 |
| Kara Braxton | 13 | 0 | 17.2 | .544 | .000 | .711 | 4.8 | 1.2 | 0.62 | 0.38 | 11.1 |
| Candice Dupree | 34 | 34 | 29.8 | .664 | .000 | .936 | 7.6 | 1.3 | 1.03 | 0.82 | 15.7 |
| Sequoia Holmes | 15 | 0 | 7.9 | .205 | .000 | .733 | 1.3 | 0.4 | 0.40 | 0.00 | 1.8 |
| Temeka Johnson | 34 | 34 | 27.3 | .411 | .309 | .796 | 3.2 | 4.7 | 0.94 | 0.21 | 9.2 |
| Taylor Lilley | 21 | 1 | 10.8 | .397 | .326 | .909 | 0.9 | 0.7 | 0.52 | 0.05 | 3.3 |
| Nicole Ohlde | 20 | 0 | 11.1 | .442 | .000 | .609 | 1.9 | 0.5 | 0.20 | 0.40 | 3.0 |
| Brooke Smith | 16 | 0 | 8.2 | .739 | .000 | .857 | 1.8 | 0.3 | 0.06 | 0.25 | 2.5 |
| Tangela Smith | 34 | 34 | 29.2 | .395 | .347 | .750 | 5.2 | 0.9 | 0.68 | 0.85 | 9.2 |
| Ketia Swanier | 32 | 0 | 10.1 | .391 | .387 | .524 | 1.2 | 1.7 | 0.34 | 0.03 | 3.0 |
| Penny Taylor | 32 | 32 | 30.0 | .509 | .442 | .893 | 4.4 | 5.0 | 1.47 | 0.28 | 15.9 |
| Diana Taurasi | 31 | 31 | 32.2 | .427 | .374 | .912 | 4.3 | 4.7 | 1.23 | 0.61 | 22.6 |

== Awards and honors ==
- Diana Taurasi was named WNBA Western Conference Player of the Week for the week of June 5, 2010.
- Candice Dupree was named WNBA Western Conference Player of the Week for the week of July 3, 2010.
- Diana Taurasi was named WNBA Western Conference Player of the Week for the week of July 17, 2010.
- Diana Taurasi was named WNBA Western Conference Player of the Week for the week of July 24, 2010.
- Candice Dupree was named to the 2010 WNBA All-Star Team as a Team USA reserve.
- Diana Taurasi was named to the 2010 WNBA All-Star Team as a Team USA starter.
- Penny Taylor was named to the 2010 WNBA All-Star Team as a WNBA reserve.
- Diana Taurasi was named to the All-WNBA First Team.
