= List of WNBA career assists leaders =

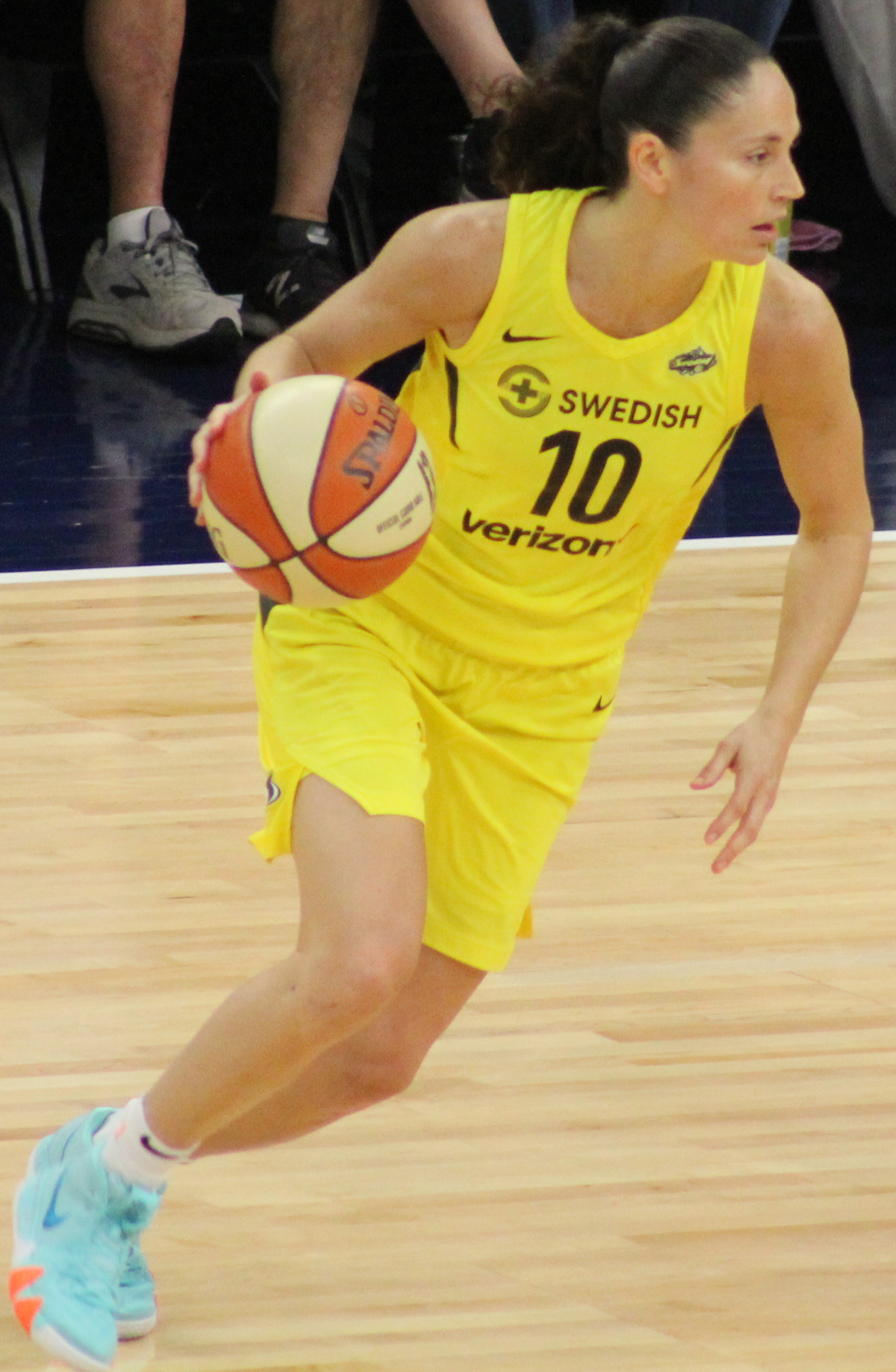
Sue Bird is the WNBA's all-time leader in assists, with 3,234.

The following is a list of the players who have achieved the most assists during their WNBA careers.

== Assists leaders ==
Statistics accurate as of the 2026 season.

^	Active WNBA player
*	Inducted into the Naismith Memorial Basketball Hall of Fame
†	Not yet eligible for Hall of Fame consideration (Note: A player is not eligible for induction into the Naismith Memorial Basketball Hall of Fame until she has been fully retired for two calendar years.)
§	1st time eligible for Hall of Fame in 2025

WNBA most assists
Rank	Player	Pos	Team(s) played for (years)	Total assists	Games played	Assists per game average (Note: Average is rounded to the nearest tenth.)
1	Sue Bird*	G	Seattle Storm (2002–2022)	3,234	580	5.6
2	Courtney Vandersloot^	G	Chicago Sky (2011–2022, 2025–present); New York Liberty (2023–2024)	3,033	463	6.6
3	Ticha Penicheiro	G	Sacramento Monarchs (1998–2009); Los Angeles Sparks (2010–2011); Chicago Sky (2012)	2,599	454	5.7
4	Diana Taurasi^{†}	G	Phoenix Mercury (2004–2024)	2,394	565	4.2
5	Lindsay Whalen*	G	Connecticut Sun (2004–2009); Minnesota Lynx (2010–2018)	2,348	480	4.9
6	Alyssa Thomas^	F	Connecticut Sun (2014–2024); Phoenix Mercury (2025–present)	2,177	401	5.4
7	Chelsea Gray^	G	Connecticut Sun (2015); Los Angeles Sparks (2016–2020); Las Vegas Aces (2021–present)	2,156	412	5.3
8	Natasha Cloud^	G	Washington Mystics (2015–2023); Phoenix Mercury (2024); New York Liberty (2025); Chicago Sky (2026–present)	1,925	367	5.2
9	Skylar Diggins^	G	Tulsa Shock/Dallas Wings (2013–2018); Phoenix Mercury (2020–2022); Seattle Storm (2024–2025); Chicago Sky (2026–present)	1,861	354	5.3
10	Becky Hammon*	G	New York Liberty (1999–2006); San Antonio Silver Stars/San Antonio Stars (2007–2014)	1,708	450	3.8
11	Candace Parker*	F/C	Los Angeles Sparks (2008–2020); Chicago Sky (2021–2022); Las Vegas Aces (2023)	1,634	410	4.0
12	Cappie Pondexter	G	Phoenix Mercury (2006–2009); New York Liberty (2010–2014); Chicago Sky (2015–2017); Los Angeles Sparks (2018); Indiana Fever (2018)	1,578	416	3.8
13	Courtney Williams^	G	Phoenix Mercury (2016); Connecticut Sun (2016–2019, 2022); Atlanta Dream (2020–2021); Chicago Sky (2023); Minnesota Lynx (2024–present)	1,552	376	4.1
14	Tamika Catchings*	F	Indiana Fever (2002–2016)	1,488	457	3.3
15	Danielle Robinson^{†}	G	San Antonio Silver Stars/San Antonio Stars/Las Vegas Aces (2011–2016, 2020); Phoenix Mercury (2017); Minnesota Lynx (2018–2019); Indiana Fever (2021–2022); Atlanta Dream (2023)	1,479	359	4.1
16	Erica Wheeler^	G	Atlanta Dream (2015, 2022); New York Liberty (2015); Indiana Fever (2016–2019, 2023–2024); Los Angeles Sparks (2021, 2026–present); Seattle Storm (2025)	1,473	384	3.8
17	Jordin Canada^	G	Seattle Storm (2018–2021); Los Angeles Sparks (2022–2023); Atlanta Dream (2024–present)	1,452	273	5.3
18	Shannon Johnson	G	Orlando Miracle/Connecticut Sun (1999–2003); San Antonio Silver Stars (2004–2006); Detroit Shock (2007); Houston Comets (2008); Seattle Storm (2009)	1,424	352	4.0
19	Tanisha Wright	G	Seattle Storm (2005–2014); New York Liberty (2015–2016, 2019); Minnesota Lynx (2018)	1,422	457	3.1
20	Temeka Johnson	G	Washington Mystics (2005); Los Angeles Sparks (2006–2008, 2015); Phoenix Mercury (2009–2010); Tulsa Shock (2011–2013); Seattle Storm (2014)	1,382	327	4.2
21	Jasmine Thomas^{†}	G	Washington Mystics (2011–2012); Atlanta Dream (2013–2014); Connecticut Sun (2015–2022); Los Angeles Sparks (2023)	1,355	390	3.5
22	Briann January	G	Indiana Fever (2009–2017); Phoenix Mercury (2018–2019); Connecticut Sun (2020–2021); Seattle Storm (2022)	1,340	393	3.4
23	Teresa Weatherspoon*	G	New York Liberty (1997–2003); Los Angeles Sparks (2004)	1,338	254	5.3
24	Dawn Staley*	G	Charlotte Sting (1999–2005); Houston Comets (2005–2006)	1,337	263	5.1
25	Jackie Young^	G	Las Vegas Aces (2019–present)	1,322	286	4.6

== Progressive list of assist leaders ==
This is a progressive list of assist leaders showing how the record increased through the years.

Statistics accurate as of the 2026 season.

^	Active WNBA player
*	Inducted into the Naismith Memorial Basketball Hall of Fame
^{†}	Not yet eligible for Hall of Fame consideration
§	Eligible for Hall of Fame in 2025

Team abbreviationsTeam(s) listed is the one player was on when she established the record.
ATL	Atlanta Dream	NYL	New York Liberty
CHI	Chicago Sky	PHO	Phoenix Mercury
CON	Connecticut Sun	SAC	Sacramento Monarchs
LAS	Los Angeles Sparks	SEA	Seattle Storm
MIN	Minnesota Lynx	WAS	Washington Mystics

Assist leader at the end of every season
Season	Year-by-year leader	Assists	Active player leader	Total assists	Career record	Total assists	Single-season record	Assists	Season
1997	Teresa Weatherspoon*NYL	173	Teresa Weatherspoon*NYL	173	Teresa Weatherspoon*NYL	173	Teresa Weatherspoon*NYL	173	1997
1998	Ticha PenicheiroSAC	225	Teresa Weatherspoon*NYL	364	Teresa Weatherspoon*NYL	364	Ticha PenicheiroSAC	225	1998
1999	Ticha PenicheiroSAC	226	Teresa Weatherspoon*NYL	569	Teresa Weatherspoon*NYL	569	Ticha PenicheiroSAC	226	1999
2000	Ticha PenicheiroSAC	236	Teresa Weatherspoon*NYL	773	Teresa Weatherspoon*NYL	773	Ticha PenicheiroSAC	236	2000
2001	Teresa Weatherspoon*NYL	203	Teresa Weatherspoon*NYL	976	Teresa Weatherspoon*NYL	976	Ticha PenicheiroSAC	236	2001
2002	Ticha PenicheiroSAC	192	Teresa Weatherspoon*NYL	1,157	Teresa Weatherspoon*NYL	1,157	Ticha PenicheiroSAC	236	2002
2003	Ticha PenicheiroSAC	229	Teresa Weatherspoon*NYL	1,306	Teresa Weatherspoon*NYL	1,306	Ticha PenicheiroSAC	236	2003
2004	Nikki TeasleyLAS	207	Ticha PenicheiroSAC	1,443	Ticha PenicheiroSAC	1,443	Ticha PenicheiroSAC	236	2004
2005	Temeka JohnsonWAS	177	Ticha PenicheiroSAC	1,592	Ticha PenicheiroSAC	1,592	Ticha PenicheiroSAC	236	2005
2006	Nikki TeasleyWAS	183	Ticha PenicheiroSAC	1,708	Ticha PenicheiroSAC	1,708	Ticha PenicheiroSAC	236	2006
2007	Lindsay Whalen*CON	169	Ticha PenicheiroSAC	1,852	Ticha PenicheiroSAC	1,852	Ticha PenicheiroSAC	236	2007
2008	Ticha PenicheiroSAC	172	Ticha PenicheiroSAC	2,024	Ticha PenicheiroSAC	2,024	Ticha PenicheiroSAC	236	2008
2009	Sue Bird*SEA	179	Ticha PenicheiroSAC	2,179	Ticha PenicheiroSAC	2,179	Ticha PenicheiroSAC	236	2009
2010	Ticha PenicheiroLAS	220	Ticha PenicheiroSAC	2,399	Ticha PenicheiroSAC	2,399	Ticha PenicheiroSAC	236	2010
2011	Lindsay Whalen*MIN	199	Ticha PenicheiroSAC	2,561	Ticha PenicheiroSAC	2,561	Ticha PenicheiroSAC	236	2011
2012	Lindsay Whalen*MIN	178	Ticha PenicheiroSAC	2,600	Ticha PenicheiroSAC	2,600	Ticha PenicheiroSAC	236	2012
2013	Lindsay Whalen*MIN	197	Lindsay Whalen*MIN	1,722	Ticha PenicheiroSAC	2,600	Ticha PenicheiroSAC	236	2013
2013	Diana Taurasi^{†}PHO	197	Lindsay Whalen*MIN	1,722	Ticha PenicheiroSAC	2,600	Ticha PenicheiroSAC	236	2013
2014	Lindsay Whalen*MIN	188	Sue Bird*SEA	2,068	Ticha PenicheiroSAC	2,600	Ticha PenicheiroSAC	236	2014
2015	Courtney Vandersloot^CHI	198	Sue Bird*SEA	2,215	Ticha PenicheiroSAC	2,600	Ticha PenicheiroSAC	236	2015
2016	Sue Bird*SEA	196	Sue Bird*SEA	2,411	Ticha PenicheiroSAC	2,600	Ticha PenicheiroSAC	236	2016
2017	Layshia Clarendon^ATL	226	Sue Bird*SEA	2,610	Sue Bird*SEA	2,610	Ticha PenicheiroSAC	236	2017
2018	Courtney Vandersloot^CHI	258	Sue Bird*SEA	2,831	Sue Bird*SEA	2,831	Courtney Vandersloot^CHI	258	2018
2019	Courtney Vandersloot^CHI	300	Diana Taurasi^{†}PHO	1,867	Sue Bird*SEA	2,831	Courtney Vandersloot^CHI	300	2019
2020	Courtney Vandersloot^CHI	219	Sue Bird*SEA	2,888	Sue Bird*SEA	2,888	Courtney Vandersloot^CHI	300	2020
2021	Courtney Vandersloot^CHI	275	Sue Bird*SEA	3,048	Sue Bird*SEA	3,048	Courtney Vandersloot^CHI	300	2021
2022	Natasha Cloud^WAS	239	Sue Bird*SEA	3,234	Sue Bird*SEA	3,234	Courtney Vandersloot^CHI	300	2022
2023	Alyssa Thomas^CON	316	Courtney Vandersloot^NYL/CHI	2,701	Sue Bird*SEA	3,234	Alyssa Thomas^CON	316	2023
2024	Caitlin Clark^IND	337	Courtney Vandersloot^NYL/CHI	2,849	Sue Bird*SEA	3,234	Caitlin Clark^IND	337	2024
2025	Alyssa Thomas^PHO	357	Courtney Vandersloot^NYL/CHI	2,886	Sue Bird*SEA	3,234	Alyssa Thomas^PHO	357	2025
2026	Alyssa Thomas^PHO	358	Courtney Vandersloot^NYL/CHI	3,033	Sue Bird*SEA	3,234	Alyssa Thomas^PHO	358	2026
Season	Year-by-year leader	Points	Active player leader	Total points	Career record	Total points	Single-season record	Points	Season
