= 2008 Los Angeles Sparks season =

- Head coach: Michael Cooper
- Arena: Staples Center

Results
- Record: 20–14 (.588)
- Place: 3rd (Western)
- Playoff finish: Lost Western Conference Finals

The 2008 Los Angeles Sparks season was the franchise's 12th season in the Women's National Basketball Association, and the second season under head coach Michael Cooper. The Sparks returned to the postseason for the first time since 2006.

== Offseason ==
The following player was selected in the Expansion Draft:

- LaToya Thomas Los Angeles Sparks

=== WNBA draft ===
- On October 23, 2007. The WNBA draft lottery was held. The Los Angeles Sparks received the first pick for the upcoming 2008 WNBA Draft.

Pick	Player	Nationality	School
1	Candace Parker	United States	Tennessee
15	Shannon Bobbitt	United States	Tennessee
29	Sharnee Zoll	United States	Virginia

=== Transactions ===
- April 24, The Sparks waived DeTrina White.
- April 23 The Sparks waived Layla Schwarz due to injury.
- April 22, The Sparks traded Taj McWilliams-Franklin and a first-round pick in the 2009 WNBA Draft to the Washington Mystics for DeLisha Milton-Jones.
- April 21 The Sparks signed Tiina Sten to a training camp contract.
- April 17 The Sparks signed Vaida Sipaviciute to a training camp contract.
- April 15 The Sparks signed Lady Comfort to a training camp contract.
- April 2 The Sparks signed Olympia Scott to a training camp contract.
- March 6, The Sparks signed Layla Schwarz, Liron Cohen and Brisa Silva to training camp contracts.
- February 22 The Sparks signed free agent Marie Ferdinand-Harris.
- February 21 The Sparks signed Jessica Moore and Raffaella Masciadri to training camp contracts.

== Preseason ==
Date	Opponent	Score	Result	Record
May 3	@ Atlanta	86-80	Win	1-0
May 8	@ Chicago	84-68	Win	2-0
May 11	@ Minnesota	106-105 (2OT)	Win	3-0

== Regular season ==
=== Candace Parker ===
- Candace Parker scored 34 points, and set a league record for the most points in a WNBA debut. Parker added 12 rebounds to help the Los Angeles Sparks beat the defending champion Phoenix Mercury 99–94 on Saturday 17. Parker, narrowly missed a triple-double with 12 rebounds and eight assists. The previous high in a WNBA debut was 25 points by Cynthia Cooper in 1997.
- On May 29 against the Indiana Fever, Parker tallied the first-ever "5x5" performance in WNBA history, posting 16 points, 16 rebounds, six blocked shots, five assists and five steals. Parker had a career-best 40-point performance on July 9 against the Houston Comets.
- On June 22, Candace Parker of the Los Angeles Sparks finished a breakaway late in a game against the Indiana Fever with a one handed slam. This marked just the second time that a player in the history of the WNBA had a slam dunk.

=== Malice at the Palace ===
- The Sparks–Shock brawl (also known as The Malice at the Palace II) was an altercation that occurred in a game between the Detroit Shock and Los Angeles Sparks on July 22, 2008, at The Palace of Auburn Hills. With 4.2 seconds before the game was officially over, the fighting began on the court after Plenette Pierson made a hard block out after a free throw on Candace Parker. This was the second brawl to occur at the Palace, the other being the Pacers–Pistons brawl.

=== Season standings ===
Western Conference	W	L	PCT	GB	Home	Road	Conf.
San Antonio Silver Stars ^{x}	24	10	.706	–	15–2	9–8	10–10
Seattle Storm ^{x}	22	12	.647	2.0	16–1	6–11	13–7
Los Angeles Sparks ^{x}	20	14	.588	4.0	12–5	8–9	12–8
Sacramento Monarchs ^{x}	18	16	.529	6.0	5–12	13–4	9–11
Houston Comets ^{o}	17	17	.500	7.0	13–4	4–13	10–10
Minnesota Lynx ^{o}	16	18	.471	8.0	10–7	6–11	8–12
Phoenix Mercury ^{o}	16	18	.471	8.0	9–8	7–10	8–12

=== Season schedule ===
Date	Opponent	Score	Result	Record
May 17	@ Phoenix	99-94	Win	1-0
May 25	@ Atlanta	74-56	Win	2-0
May 29	@ Indiana	78-82 (2OT)	Loss	2-1
May 31	@ Washington	70-59	Win	3-1
June 3	@ Chicago	81-77 (OT)	Win	4-1
June 6	vs. Phoenix	79-85	Loss	4-2
June 11	vs. Detroit	80-73	Win	5-2
June 13	vs. Connecticut	98-93 (OT)	Win	6-2
June 14	@ Sacramento	74-66	Win	7-2
June 18	vs. Chicago	80-67	Win	8-2
June 20	@ San Antonio	75-77	Loss	8-3
June 22	vs. Indiana	77-63	Win	9-3
June 24	vs. Seattle	76-62	Win	10-3
June 26	vs. Washington	74-77 (OT)	Loss	10-4
July 1	vs. New York	78-89	Loss	10-5
July 3	vs. Minnesota	70-88	Loss	10-6
July 6	vs. Phoenix	91-80	Win	11-6
July 9	vs. Houston	82-74(OT)	Win	12-6
July 10	@ Sacramento	69-87	Loss	12-7
July 12	@ Seattle	52-70	Loss	12-8
July 14	vs. San Antonio	75-62	Win	13-8
July 17	@ Phoenix	92-99	Loss	13-9
July 19	@ Houston	72-75(OT)	Loss	13-10
July 22	@ Detroit	84-81	Win	14-10
July 24	@ Connecticut	61-87	Loss	14-11
July 25	@ New York	68-69	Loss	14-12
July 27	@ Minnesota	92-84(OT)	Win	15-12
August 28	vs. Sacramento	78-63	Win	16-12
August 30	vs. San Antonio	58-53	Win	17-12
September 1	vs. Minnesota	82-58	Win	18-12
September 5	@ San Antonio	58-76	Loss	18-13
September 6	@ Houston	84-66	Win	19-13
September 11	vs. Atlanta	72-83	Loss	19-14
September 14	vs. Seattle	65-48	Win	20-14

== Player stats ==
Note: GP= Games played; MIN= Minutes; REB= Rebounds; AST= Assists; STL = Steals; BLK = Blocks; PTS = Points; AVG = Average

Player	GP	MPG	RPG	APG	SPG	BPG	APG
Shannon Bobbitt							
Lisa Leslie	33	32.1	8.9	2.4	1.5	2.9	15.1
Marie Ferdinand-Harris	33	20.6	2.6	1.3	0.8	0.1	8.4
DeLisha Milton-Jones	7	230	50	15	7	5	
Raffaella Masciardi	5	102	11	6	1	0	
Muriel Page							
Candace Parker	33	33.6	9.5	3.4	1.3	2.3	18.5
Sidney Spencer	33	13.7	1.9	0.6	0.4	0.1	5.3

== Roster ==
2008 Los Angeles Sparks roster
Players
Coaches

Pos.	No.	Nat.	Name	Height	Weight	From
PG	6	(United States)	Bobbitt, Shannon	5' 2" (1.57m)	130 lb (59kg)	Tennessee
PG	4	(United States)	Brown, Kiesha	5' 10" (1.78m)	134 lb (61kg)	Georgia
C	12	(Poland)	Dydek, Margo	7' 2" (2.18m)	223 lb (101kg)	Poland
SG	24	(United States)	Ferdinand-Harris, Marie	5' 9" (1.75m)	153 lb (69kg)	LSU
PG	2	(United States)	Johnson, Temeka	5' 3" (1.6m)	132 lb (60kg)	LSU
C	9	(United States)	Leslie, Lisa (C)	6' 5" (1.96m)	170 lb (77kg)	USC
G/F	33	(Italy)	Masciadri, Raffaella	6' 0" (1.83m)	169 lb (77kg)	Italy
SF	8	(United States)	Milton-Jones, DeLisha	6' 1" (1.85m)	185 lb (84kg)	Florida
PF	31	(United States)	Moore, Jessica	6' 3" (1.91m)	175 lb (79kg)	Connecticut
PF	00	(United States)	Page, Murriel	6' 2" (1.88m)	160 lb (73kg)	Florida
F/C	3	(United States)	Parker, Candace	6' 4" (1.93m)	175 lb (79kg)	Tennessee
G/F	1	(United States)	Spencer, Sidney	6' 3" (1.91m)	183 lb (83kg)	Tennessee
C	32	(United States)	Thomas, Christi	6' 3" (1.91m)	185 lb (84kg)	Georgia

Head coach
(United States) Michael Cooper (New Mexico)
Assistant coaches
(United States) Laura Beeman (California State University)
(United States) Marianne Stanley (Immaculata)
Athletic trainer
(United States) Rachel Schlachet (Arizona State)
Strength and conditioning coach
(United States) Bruce Deziel

Legend

- (C) Team captain
- (DP) Unsigned draft pick
- (FA) Free agent
- (S) Suspended
- Injured

WNBA roster page

== Playoffs ==
Round	Date	Opponent	Score	Result	Record
Western Conference Semi	September 19	vs. Seattle	77-69	Win	1-0
	September 21	@ Seattle	50-64	Loss	1-1
	September 23	@ Seattle	71-64	Win	2-1
Western Conference Final	September 25	vs. San Antonio	85-70	Win	1-0 (3-1)
	September 27	@ San Antonio	66-67	Loss	1-1 (3-2)
	September 28	@ San Antonio	72-76	Loss	1-2 (3-3)

== Awards and honors ==
- Lisa Leslie, All WNBA First Team
- Lisa Leslie, Led WNBA, Blocks (2.9 per game)
- Lisa Leslie, All-WNBA Defensive First Team
- Candace Parker, WNBA Rookie of the Year
- Candace Parker, WNBA MVP
- Candace Parker, Forward, All-WNBA Rookie Team
- Candace Parker, Hanns-G 'Go Beyond' Rookie of the Month award in May (For the month of May, she averaged 19.2 points, 11.5 rebounds and 6.3 assists in four games)
- Candace Parker, Hanns-G 'Go Beyond' Rookie of the Month award in July (In the 12 games played in July she averaged 20.8 points, 9.5 rebounds per game and collected eight double-doubles)
- Candace Parker, Led WNBA in double-doubles (17)
- Candace Parker, Led WNBA Rookies, Points per game (18.5)
- Candace Parker, Led WNBA Rookies, Blocks per game (2.3)
- Candace Parker, Led WNBA Rookies, Minutes per game (33.6)
- Candace Parker, Led WNBA, Rebounds per game (9.5)
