= Temeka Johnson =

American basketball player (born 1982)

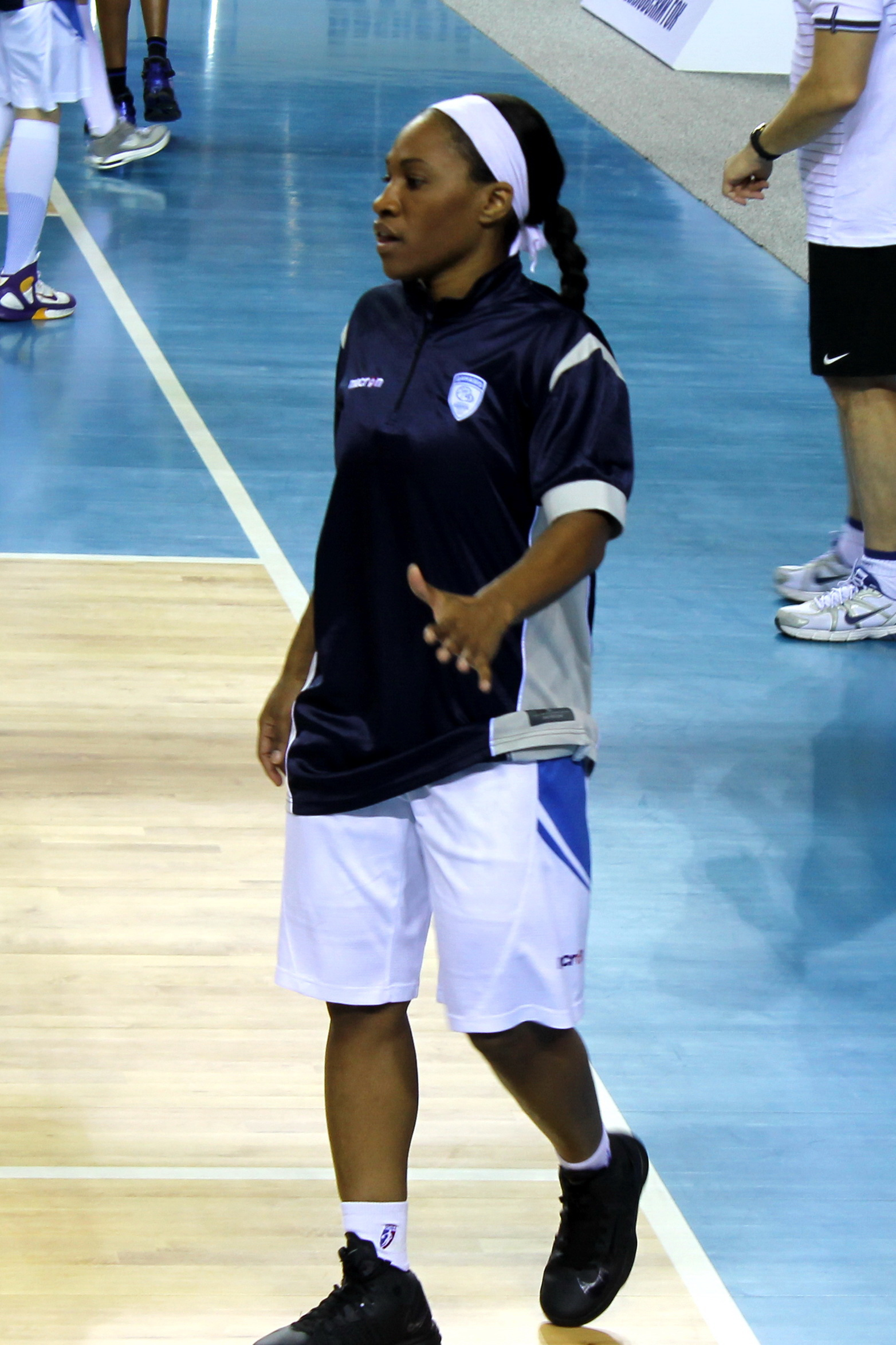

Current position
- Title: Associate head coach
- Team: Louisiana
- Conference: Sun Belt

Biographical details
- Born: September 6, 1982 (age 43); New Orleans, Louisiana, U.S.

Playing career
- 1997–2000: Bonnabel (Kenner, Louisiana)
- 2001–2005: LSU
- 2005: Washington Mystics
- 2005–2006: Bnei Yehuda
- 2006: Lotos VBW Clima Gdynia
- 2006–2008: Los Angeles Sparks
- 2008–2009: Raanana Hasharon
- 2009–2011: Phoenix Mercury
- 2009–2010: Maccabi Bnot Ashdod
- 2010: USO Mondeville
- 2011–2013: Dynamo Kursk
- 2012–2013: Tulsa Shock
- 2013–2014: Seattle Storm
- 2013–2014: Nadezhda Orenburg
- 2014–2015: Maccabi Bnot Ashdod
- 2015: Los Angeles Sparks
- 2015–2016: AGÜ Spor
- 2016–2017: Maccabi Bnot Ashdod
- Position: Point guard

Coaching career (HC unless noted)
- 2021–2022: John Curtis (River Ridge, LA)
- 2022-2025: Western Kentucky (AC)
- 2025–present: Louisiana (assoc.)

Accomplishments and honors

Awards
- As a player: WNBA champion (2009); WNBA Rookie of the Year (2005); WNBA All-Rookie Team (2005); Elizur Cup winner (2010); EuroCup winner (2012); Nancy Lieberman Award (2005); All-American – USBWA (2005); Second-team All-American – AP (2005); 2× First-team All-SEC (2004, 2005); SEC Tournament MVP (2003)

Temeka Rochelle Johnson (born September 6, 1982) is an American former professional basketball player, currently serving as the associate head coach for Louisiana. Her primary position was a point guard.

== Early life ==
Johnson attended Bonnabel High School in Kenner, Louisiana.

== College career ==
Johnson played for the LSU Lady Tigers from 2001 to 2005, graduating from the school in 2005. She broke LSU's career assist record. She was also teammates with Seimone Augustus.

- AP All-American honorable mention (2004, 2003, 2002)
- All-SEC First Team (2005, 2004)
- All-SEC Third Team (2003)
- SEC Tournament MVP (2003)
- SEC All-Tournament Team (2003, 2002)

== WNBA career ==
Johnson was selected 6th overall in the 2005 WNBA draft. Upon joining the Mystics she was doubted for being too short to play professional basketball. That same year she would walk away with the 2005 WNBA Rookie of the Year award. In addition, she ranked 2nd in the league in assists. At the beginning of the 2006 season, she was traded to the Los Angeles Sparks, and during the 2009 off-season, to the Phoenix Mercury who went on to win the WNBA Championship later that year. On January 12, 2012, Johnson was traded to the Tulsa Shock for Andrea Riley. On February 7, 2013, Johnson signed with the Seattle Storm to fill a gap at the starting point guard position left by Sue Bird who was out for the whole season while recovering from knee surgery. In her second season with the Storm, Johnson became the shortest player in WNBA history to record a triple-double with a performance of 13 points, 11 assists and a career-high 10 rebounds while standing only 5'3". On March 17, 2015, it was announced that Johnson was released by the Storm. Johnson signed once again with the Los Angeles Sparks on March 23, 2015. While playing with the Sparks in the 2015 season, Johnson scored her 2500th career point and recorded her 300th career steal.

== International career ==
Johnson was a member of the gold medal 2003 USA World Championship Young Women Team in Šibenik, Croatia.

== Overseas career ==
In the 2005–06 WNBA off-season, Johnson played in both Israel and Poland for Bnei Yehuda and Lotos VBW Clima Gdynia. She played for Raanana Hasharon in Israel during the 2008–09 WNBA off-season. In the 2009–10 WNBA off-season, Johnson played in Israel for Maccabi Bnot Ashdod. From 2011 to 2013, Johnson played two off-seasons in Russia for Dynamo Kursk. In the 2013–14 WNBA off-season, Johnson played for another Russian team, Nadezhda Orenburg. In October 2015, Johnson signed with AGÜ Spor for the 2015–16 WNBA off-season. In November 2016, Johnson signed once again with Maccabi Bnot Ashdod for the 2016–17 WNBA off-season.

== Career statistics ==
Legend
GP	Games played	GS	Games started	MPG	Minutes per game	RPG	Rebounds per game
APG	Assists per game	SPG	Steals per game	BPG	Blocks per game	PPG	Points per game
TO	Turnovers per game	FG%	Field-goal percentage	3P%	3-point field-goal percentage	FT%	Free-throw percentage
**Bold**	Career best	°	League leader

†	Denotes season in which Johnson won a WNBA championship

=== WNBA ===
==== Regular season ====
WNBA regular season statistics
Year	Team	GP	GS	MPG	FG%	3P%	FT%	RPG	APG	SPG	BPG	TO	PPG
2005	Washington	**34**	**34**	28.6	**45.8**	30.2	78.8	3.1	**5.2**	1.3	0.0	2.6	9.3
2006	Los Angeles	32	30	25.3	40.2	11.5	80.0	3.0	5.0	**1.5**	0.0	2.2	8.0
2007	Los Angeles	11	11	18.7	33.0	33.3	68.8	2.6	2.7	0.7	0.1	2.8	6.4
2008	Los Angeles	23	8	17.1	34.7	0.0	72.	1.9	3.1	1.0	0.1	1.6	4.2
2009^{†}	Phoenix	**34**	**34**	26.5	44.5	41.4	84.0	**3.5**	4.6	0.9	0.1	2.2	9.6
2010	Phoenix	**34**	**34**	27.3	41.1	30.9	79.6	3.2	4.7	0.9	**0.2**	2.0	9.2
2011	Phoenix	30	30	23.9	43.5	38.5	86.4	2.0	4.4	0.8	**0.2**	1.9	6.4
2012	Tulsa	29	28	**28.7**	41.6	**53.1**	84.0	3.2	4.7	1.2	0.0	2.7	**12.2**
2013	Seattle	32	32	27.4	42.9	36.8	87.5	2.6	4.0	0.9	0.1	2.7	10.2
2014	Seattle	**34**	3	17.0	36.1	34.0	**92.1**	2.1	3.2	0.7	0.1	1.6	5.8
2015	Los Angeles	**34**	11	21.2	32.3	24.6	84.1	2.4	3.6	0.7	0.0	**1.5**	5.1
**Career**	11 years, 5 teams	327	255	24.3	40.7	34.5	82.5	2.7	4.2	1.0	0.1	2.1	8.0

==== Playoffs ====
WNBA playoffs statistics
Year	Team	GP	GS	MPG	FG%	3P%	FT%	RPG	APG	SPG	BPG	TO	PPG
2006	Los Angeles	5	5	28.0	41.7	20.0	83.3	1.8	4.8	**1.6**	0.0	2.0	9.2
2008	Los Angeles	6	0	19.2	45.5	28.6	85.7	2.3	3.5	1.0	**0.2**	2.2	8.0
2009^{†}	Phoenix	**11**	**11**	24.3	39.5	48.1	83.3	1.9	3.1	0.7	**0.2**	1.5	7.5
2010	Phoenix	4	4	**30.3**	35.6	33.3	**100.0**	**3.8**	**8.3**	1.0	0.0	2.0	**9.5**
2011	Phoenix	5	5	27.0	25.0	11.1	62.5	2.4	5.0	0.8	0.0	2.0	5.8
2013	Seattle	2	2	23.5	**54.5**	**100.0**	60.0	0.5	3.0	1.5	0.0	2.5	8.0
2015	Los Angeles	3	0	12.3	25.0	0.0	0.0	2.0	1.7	0.7	0.0	**1.0**	1.3
**Career**	7 years, 3 teams	36	27	23.9	38.0	31.5	73.8	2.2	4.1	1.0	0.1	1.8	7.3

=== College ===
NCAA statistics
Year	Team	GP	Points	FG%	3P%	FT%	RPG	APG	SPG	BPG	PPG
2001–02	LSU	24	266	50.5	14.3	72.3	**4.8**	7.5	1.6	–	11.1
2002–03	LSU	34	339	**50.6**	40.0	72.4	3.6	5.9	**2.0**	**0.1**	10.0
2003–04	LSU	35	**447**	48.7	31.3	**81.0**	**4.8**	**8.3**	1.8	**0.1**	**12.8**
2004–05	LSU	**36**	374	47.9	**50.0**	72.3	3.3	7.7	1.9	0.0	10.4
**Career**		93	1426	49.8	28.6	75.7	4.4	7.2	1.8	0.0	11.3

== See also ==
- List of WNBA career assists leaders
