= 2009 Phoenix Mercury season =

Women's basketball season in the United States

- Head coach: Corey Gaines
- Arena: US Airways Center

Results
- Record: 23–11 (.676)
- Place: 1st (Western)
- Playoff finish: Won WNBA Finals

Media
- Television: FSN Arizona

The 2009 WNBA season was the 13th season for the Phoenix Mercury of the Women's National Basketball Association (WNBA). The Mercury won the WNBA Finals for the second time in franchise history. On June 6, the Mercury and LifeLock entered a multi-year marketing partnership to launch the first-ever branded jersey in WNBA or NBA history. A press conference was held at the NBA Store in New York City with Phoenix Mercury President and COO Jay Parry and LifeLock CEO Todd Davis to make the announcement. The partnership ran through 2011, and the LifeLock name was on the front of Phoenix Mercury’s player jerseys and on warm-up suits. The Mercury and LifeLock ware the first to finalize such an agreement following the WNBA’s decision this off-season to make this opportunity available for its teams and sponsors. As part of the partnership, LifeLock offered a one-year complimentary membership to season ticket holders of all WNBA teams.

== Off-season ==
=== Dispersal draft ===
Based on the Mercury's 2008 record, they picked 5th in the Houston Comets dispersal draft. The Mercury picked Sequoia Holmes.

=== WNBA draft ===
The following are the Mercury's selections in the 2009 WNBA draft:

Round	Pick	Player	Nationality	School/Team/Country
1	5	DeWanna Bonner	United States	Auburn
3	31	Sha Brooks	United States	Florida
3	34 (from N.Y.)	Jessica Adair	United States	George Washington

=== Transactions ===
- July 17: The Mercury re-signed Penny Taylor.
- July 14: The Mercury waived Allie Quigley.
- June 3: The Mercury waived Alison Bales, Sha Brooks, and Laurie Koehn and claimed Ketia Swanier off waivers.
- June 2: The Mercury waived Yuko Oga.
- May 31: The Mercury waived Murriel Page.
- May 18: The Mercury signed Murriel Page.
- May 13: The Mercury waived Jessica Adair.
- April 30: The Mercury signed Laurie Koehn.
- April 20: The Mercury waived Kim Smith and A'Quonesia Franklin.
- March 26: The Mercury acquired Temeka Johnson from the Los Angeles Sparks in exchange for a first-round 2010 WNBA draft pick.
- March 20: The Mercury traded Barbara Farris to the Sacramento Monarchs in exchange for A'Quonesia Franklin and Kim Smith.
- March 16: The Mercury has withdrawn its qualifying offer to Belinda Snell.
- February 11: The Mercury signed Yuko Oga to a training camp contract.
- January 30: The Mercury traded Kelly Miller and LaToya Pringle to the Minnesota Lynx in exchange for Nicole Ohlde.
- January 21: The Mercury acquired Alison Bales from the Atlanta Dream in exchange for a second-round 2009 WNBA draft pick.
- January 7: The Mercury signed Brooke Smith to a training-camp contract.
- May 7, 2008: The Mercury acquired a third-round pick in the 2009 WNBA Draft from the New York Liberty as part of the Leilani Mitchell transaction.

Date	Trade	
March 7, 2008	To Phoenix Mercury	To New York Liberty
March 7, 2008	third-round pick in 2009 WNBA Draft	Leilani Mitchell
January 21, 2009	To Phoenix Mercury	To Atlanta Dream
January 21, 2009	Alison Bales	second-round pick in 2009 WNBA Draft
January 30, 2009	To Phoenix Mercury	To Minnesota Lynx
January 30, 2009	Nicole Ohlde	Kelly Miller and LaToya Pringle
March 20, 2009	To Phoenix Mercury	To Sacramento Monarchs
March 20, 2009	A'Quonesia Franklin and Kim Smith	Barbara Farris
March 26, 2009	To Phoenix Mercury	To Los Angeles Sparks
March 26, 2009	Temeka Johnson	first-round pick in 2010 WNBA Draft

=== Free agents ===
==== Additions ====
Player	Signed	Former team
Sequoia Holmes	December 8, 2008	Houston Comets
Brooke Smith	January 7, 2009	re-signed
Nicole Ohlde	January 30, 2009	Minnesota Lynx
Temeka Johnson	March 26, 2009	Los Angeles Sparks
Ketia Swanier	June 3, 2009	Connecticut Sun
Penny Taylor	July 17, 2009	re-signed

==== Subtractions ====
Player	Left	New team
Kelly Miller	January 30, 2009	Minnesota Lynx
LaToya Pringle	January 30, 2009	Minnesota Lynx
Barbara Farris	March 20, 2009	Detroit Shock
Yuko Oga	June 2, 2009	free agent
Sha Brooks	June 3, 2009	free agent
Allie Quigley	July 14, 2009	free agent
Jennifer Derevjanik	2009	free agent
Olympia Scott	2009	free agent

== Roster ==
2009 Phoenix Mercury roster
Players
Coaches

Pos.	No.	Nat.	Name	Height	Weight	From
G	24	(United States)	Bonner, DeWanna	6' 4" (1.93m)	136 lb (62kg)	Auburn
PG	2	(United States)	Johnson, Temeka	5' 3" (1.6m)	132 lb (60kg)	LSU
SG	33	(United States)	Mazzante, Kelly	6' 0" (1.83m)	155 lb (70kg)	Penn State
F/C	30	(United States)	Ohlde, Nicole	6' 5" (1.96m)	190 lb (86kg)	Kansas State
SG	23	(United States)	Pondexter, Cappie	5' 9" (1.75m)	160 lb (73kg)	Rutgers
F/C	21	(United States)	Smith, Brooke	6' 3" (1.91m)	195 lb (88kg)	Stanford
C	50	(United States)	Smith, Tangela	6' 4" (1.93m)	160 lb (73kg)	Iowa
PG	11	(United States)	Swanier, Ketia	5' 7" (1.7m)	144 lb (65kg)	Connecticut
F	13	(Australia)	Taylor, Penny	6' 1" (1.85m)	163 lb (74kg)	Australia
G/F	3	(United States)	Taurasi, Diana	6' 0" (1.83m)	172 lb (78kg)	Connecticut
PF	43	(United States)	Willingham, Le'Coe	6' 0" (1.83m)	200 lb (91kg)	Auburn

Head coach
(United States) Corey Gaines (Loyola Marymount)
Assistant coaches
(United States) Bridget Pettis (Florida)
(United States) Julie Hairgrove (Arizona)
Athletic trainer
(United States) Tanara Oiike (California State University)
Strength and conditioning coach
(United States) Tanara Oiike (California State University)

Legend

- (C) Team captain
- (DP) Unsigned draft pick
- (FA) Free agent
- (S) Suspended
- Injured

WNBA roster page

== Season standings ==
Western Conference	W	L	PCT	GB	Home	Road	Conf.
Phoenix Mercury ^{x}	23	11	.676	–	12–5	11–6	13–7
Seattle Storm ^{x}	20	14	.588	3.0	13–4	7–10	13–7
Los Angeles Sparks ^{x}	18	16	.529	5.0	11–6	7–10	11–9
San Antonio Silver Stars ^{x}	15	19	.441	8.0	10–7	5–12	10–10
Minnesota Lynx ^{o}	14	20	.412	9.0	9–8	5–12	7–13
Sacramento Monarchs ^{o}	12	22	.353	11.0	7–10	5–12	6–14

== Schedule ==
=== Preseason ===
2009 Game Log: Preseason

Game	Date	Time (ET)	Opponent	Score	High points	High rebounds	High assists	Location/Attendance	Record
1	May 27	2:00pm	@ Sacramento	74-70	Quigley (15)	Bonner, B. Smith (6)	Quigley (4)	ARCO Arena; 6,339	1–0
2	May 30	10:00pm	Seattle	61-58	Johnson (13)	Brooke Smith (6)	Pondexter (6)	US Airways Center; 2,421	2-0

=== Regular season ===
2009 Game log: Regular season
June

Game	Date	Time (ET)	Opponent	TV	Score	High points	High rebounds	High assists	Location/Attendance	Record
1	June 6	10:00pm	San Antonio	NBA TV; KMYS	90-79	Taurasi (25)	Bonner (11)	Johnson (9)	US Airways Center; 13,582	1-0
2	June 10	10:00pm	New York		91-84	Pondexter (26)	5 players (5)	Johnson, Taurasi (5)	US Airways Center; 5,080	2-0
3	June 12	10:00pm	@ Sacramento		71-90	Bonner (14)	Bonner (5)	Pondexter (4)	ARCO Arena; 6,438	2-1
4	June 13	10:00pm	Sacramento		115-104 (OT)	Taurasi (31)	T. Smith (7)	Johnson (8)	US Airways Center; 7,173	3-1
5	June 17	10:00pm	Minnesota		104-80	Taurasi (38)	Bonner (10)	Pondexter (9)	US Airways Center; 6,524	4-1
6	June 19	10:00pm	Los Angeles		89-81	Pondexter (21)	T. Smith (8)	Johnson (7)	US Airways Center; 8,255	5-1
7	June 21	7:00pm	Seattle	NBA TV; FSNA	84-93	Taurasi (25)	Pondexter (5)	Pondexter (6)	US Airways Center; 6,181	5-2
8	June 23	7:30pm	@ San Antonio	ESPN2	87-91	Pondexter (26)	Taurasi (8)	Johnson (5)	AT&T Center; 6,692	5-3
9	June 25	7:00pm	@ Washington		93-87	Pondexter (24)	Bonner, T. Smith, Taurasi (8)	Johnson (6)	Verizon Center; 9,808	6-3
10	June 27	8:00pm	@ Minnesota	NBA TV; FSNA; FSN-N	80-109	Bonner, Pondexter (19)	Taurasi (8)	Pondexter, Swanier (3)	Target Center; 5,911	6-4

July

Game	Date	Time (ET)	Opponent	TV	Score	High points	High rebounds	High assists	Location/Attendance	Record
11	July 1	10:00pm	Seattle		91-83	Pondexter, Taurasi (22)	Pondexter (11)	Pondexter (8)	US Airways Center; 6,341	7-4
12	July 5	9:30pm	@ Los Angeles	NBA TV; FSNA; FSNW	104-89	Pondexter (21)	Bonner (10)	Taurasi (6)	STAPLES Center; 9,872	8-4
13	July 8	10:00pm	Chicago		90-70	Taurasi (22)	T. Smith (13)	Pondexter (6)	US Airways Center; 5,597	9-4
14	July 11	10:00pm	@ Sacramento		107-105	Pondexter (23)	Bonner, Taurasi (8)	Pondexter (8)	ARCO Arena; 7,798	10-4
15	July 15	3:30pm	Sacramento	NBA TV; FSNA	100-81	Taurasi (22)	Johnson (6)	Pondexter (15)	US Airways Center; 11,590	11-4
16	July 18	10:00pm	Detroit		97-90	Pondexter (26)	Pondexter, Willingham (7)	Pondexter (8)	US Airways Center; 8,288	12-4
17	July 22	10:00pm	Minnesota		86-99	Pondexter (28)	Bonner (10)	Johnson (6)	US Airways Center; 7,360	12-5
18	July 26	4:00pm	@ New York		94-88	Taurasi (34)	Taurasi (13)	Johnson (7)	Madison Square Garden; 11,211	13-5
19	July 28	7:30pm	@ Connecticut	ESPN2	95-80	Pondexter (29)	T. Smith, Taurasi (9)	Johnson (7)	Mohegan Sun Arena; 7,739	14-5
20	July 30	7:30pm	@ Atlanta		76-106	T. Smith (15)	Taurasi (7)	Swanier (5)	Philips Arena; 7,827	14-6

August

Game	Date	Time (ET)	Opponent	TV	Score	High points	High rebounds	High assists	Location/Attendance	Record
21	August 1	8:00pm	@ Minnesota		87-74	Taurasi (20)	T. Smith (7)	Willingham (5)	Target Center; 6,631	15-6
22	August 4	10:00pm	@ Seattle		101-90 (OT)	Taurasi (19)	Pondexter, T. Smith (8)	Johnson (7)	KeyArena; 6,728	16-6
23	August 8	10:00pm	Indiana		83-90	Taurasi (15)	Bonner, Taurasi (5)	Swanier (6)	US Airways Center; 9,867	16-7
24	August 13	10:00pm	San Antonio		95-83	Taurasi (29)	Bonner, Taurasi (6)	Taurasi (6)	US Airways Center; 6,522	17-7
25	August 15	8:00pm	@ San Antonio	NBA TV; FSNA; KMYS	89-106	Taurasi (21)	Bonner (5)	Johnson, Pondexter (5)	AT&T Center; 8,933	17-8
26	August 18	8:00pm	@ Chicago		106-99	Taurasi (27)	Bonner (10)	Taurasi (7)	UIC Pavilion; TBA	18-8
27	August 21	10:00pm	Washington		81-91	Taurasi (16)	Bonner (7)	Pondexter (6)	US Airways Center; 9,155	18-9
28	August 27	10:30pm	@ Los Angeles	NBA TV; FSNW	98-90	Pondexter (26)	Bonner (9)	Johnson, Pondexter (6)	STAPLES Center; 9,586	19-9
29	August 29	10:00pm	Connecticut	NBA TV; WCTX	95-84	Taurasi (21)	Taurasi (9)	Taurasi (5)	US Airways Center; 9,977	20-9

September

Game	Date	Time (ET)	Opponent	TV	Score	High points	High rebounds	High assists	Location/Attendance	Record
30	September 1	7:30pm	@ Detroit		99-101	Pondexter (25)	T. Smith, Willingham (7)	Taurasi (6)	Palace of Auburn Hills; 5,239	20-10
31	September 2	7:00pm	@ Indiana	NBA TV; FSI	106-90	Pondexter (25)	Ohlde (7)	Johnson (6)	Conseco Fieldhouse; 7,446	21-10
32	September 5	10:00pm	Atlanta		100-82	Bonner (20)	Bonner (7)	Taurasi (7)	US Airways Center; 10,424	22-10
33	September 10	10:00pm	@ Seattle		92-84 (OT)	Taurasi (24)	Taurasi (8)	Pondexter (8)	KeyArena; 9,089	23-10
34	September 13	3:00pm	Los Angeles	ESPN2	78-81	Johnson (14)	Willingham (7)	Taylor (4)	US Airways Center; 12,968	23-11

All games are viewable on WNBA LiveAccess

=== Postseason ===
2009 Game log: Postseason
Western Conference Semifinals

Game	Date	Time (ET)	Opponent	TV	Score	High points	High rebounds	High assists	Location/Attendance	Series
1	September 17	9:00pm	@ San Antonio	ESPN2	91-92	Taylor (18)	Taurasi (7)	Taylor (6)	AT&T Center; 5,721	0-1
2	September 19	10:00pm	San Antonio	NBA TV	106-78	Taurasi (24)	Bonner (13)	Taurasi (5)	US Airways Center; 7,267	1-1
3	September 21	10:00pm	San Antonio	ESPN2	100-92	Taurasi (30)	T. Smith (8)	Taurasi (5)	US Airways Center; 6,896	2-1

Western Conference Finals

Game	Date	Time (ET)	Opponent	TV	Score	High points	High rebounds	High assists	Location/Attendance	Series
1	September 23	10:00pm	@ Los Angeles	ESPN2	103-94	Taurasi (28)	T. Smith (6)	Taurasi (6)	Pauley Pavilion; 6,389	1-0
2	September 25	10:00pm	Los Angeles	NBA TV	76-87	Taurasi (25)	Pondexter (7)	Taylor (5)	US Airways Center; 7,628	1-1
3	September 26	10:00pm	Los Angeles	NBA TV	85-74	Taurasi (21)	Taurasi (7)	Taylor (4)	US Airways Center; 7,226	2-1

WNBA Finals

Game	Date	Time (ET)	Opponent	TV	Score	High points	High rebounds	High assists	Location/Attendance	Series
1	September 29	9:00pm	Indiana	ESPN2	120-116 (OT)	Pondexter, Taylor (23)	Taurasi (9)	Taurasi (6)	US Airways Center; 11,617	1-0
2	October 1	9:00pm	Indiana	ESPN2	84-93	Taurasi (20)	Taurasi (7)	Johnson (5)	US Airways Center; 16,758	1-1
3	October 4	4:00pm	@ Indiana	ESPN2	85-86	Pondexter (23)	T. Smith (10)	Pondexter (8)	Conseco Fieldhouse; 18,165	1-2
4	October 7	7:30pm	@ Indiana	ESPN2	90-77	Pondexter (22)	Willingham (8)	Pondexter (7)	Conseco Fieldhouse; 18,165	2-2
5	October 9	9:00pm	Indiana	ESPN2	94-86	Taurasi (26)	T. Smith (8)	Taylor (5)	US Airways Center; 17,313	3-2

== Regular season statistics ==
Legend
GP	Games played	GS	Games started	MPG	Minutes per game	RPG	Rebounds per game
APG	Assists per game	SPG	Steals per game	BPG	Blocks per game	PPG	Points per game
FG%	Field-goal percentage	3P%	3-point field-goal percentage	FT%	Free-throw percentage	TO	Turnovers per game
PF	Fouls per game		Team leader		League leader

=== Player statistics ===
Player	GP	GS	MPG	RPG	APG	SPG	BPG	PPG
DeWanna Bonner	0	0	00.0	0.0	0.0	0.00	0.00	0.0
Temeka Johnson	0	0	00.0	0.0	0.0	0.00	0.00	0.0
Kelly Mazzante	0	0	00.0	0.0	0.0	0.00	0.00	0.0
Nicole Ohlde	0	0	00.0	0.0	0.0	0.00	0.00	0.0
Cappie Pondexter	0	0	00.0	0.0	0.0	0.00	0.00	0.0
Allie Quigley	0	0	00.0	0.0	0.0	0.00	0.00	0.0
Brooke Smith	0	0	00.0	0.0	0.0	0.00	0.00	0.0
Tangela Smith	0	0	00.0	0.0	0.0	0.00	0.00	0.0
Ketia Swanier	0	0	00.0	0.0	0.0	0.00	0.00	0.0
Diana Taurasi	0	0	00.0	0.0	0.0	0.00	0.00	0.0
Penny Taylor	0	0	00.0	0.0	0.0	0.00	0.00	0.0
Le'coe Willingham	0	0	00.0	0.0	0.0	0.00	0.00	0.0

=== Team statistics ===
Team	FG%	3P%	FT%	RPG	APG	SPG	BPG	TO	PF	PPG
Phoenix Mercury	.000	.000	.000	00.0	00.0	0.0	0.0	00.0	00.0	00.0
Opponents	.000	.000	.000	00.0	00.0	0.0	0.0	00.0	00.0	00.0

== Awards and honors ==
- Cappie Pondexter was named WNBA Western Conference Player of the Week for the week of June 29, 2009.
- Cappie Pondexter was named WNBA Western Conference Player of the Week for the week of July 6, 2009.
- Cappie Pondexter was named WNBA Western Conference Player of the Week for the week of July 13, 2009.
- Diana Taurasi was named WNBA Western Conference Player of the Week for the week of August 10, 2009.
- Diana Taurasi was named to the 2009 WNBA All-Star Team as a Western Conference reserve.
- Cappie Pondexter was named to the 2009 WNBA All-Star Team as a Western Conference reserve.
- DeWanna Bonner was named Sixth Woman of the Year.
- Diana Taurasi was named to the All-WNBA First Team.
- Cappie Pondexter was named to the All-WNBA First Team.
- Diana Taurasi was named Most Valuable Player.
