= Corey Gaines =

American basketball player and coach (born 1965)

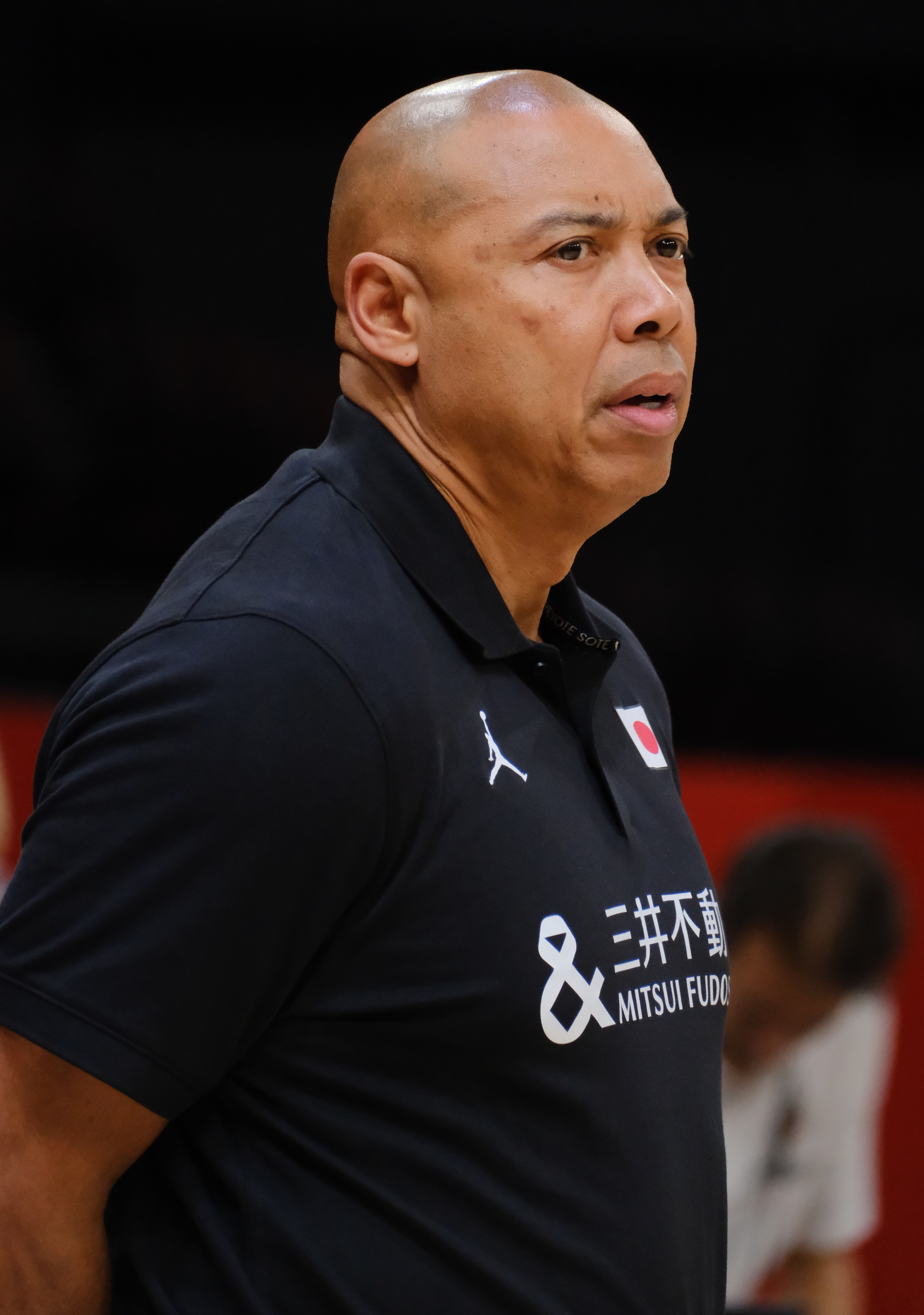

Personal information
- Born: June 1, 1965 (age 61) Los Angeles, California, U.S.
- Listed height: 6 ft 3 in (1.91 m)
- Listed weight: 195 lb (88 kg)

Career information
- High school: Saint Bernard (Playa del Rey, California)
- College: UCLA (1983–1986); Loyola Marymount (1987–1988)
- NBA draft: 1988: 3rd round, 65th overall pick
- Drafted by: Seattle SuperSonics
- Playing career: 1988–2004
- Position: Shooting guard
- Number: 12, 8, 1, 7, 5
- Coaching career: 2003–present

Career history

Playing
- 1988–1989: Quad City Thunder
- 1989: New Jersey Nets
- 1989: Calgary 88's
- 1989–1990: Omaha Racers
- 1990: Philadelphia 76ers
- 1990: Omaha Racers
- 1990: Denver Nuggets
- 1990–1991: Yakima Sun Kings
- 1991–1992: Sioux Falls Skyforce
- 1992: Montreal Dragons
- 1992–1993: Yakima Sun Kings
- 1993: La Crosse Catbirds
- 1993–1994: New York Knicks
- 1994–1995: Scavolini Pesaro
- 1995: Philadelphia 76ers
- 1995–1996: Galatasaray
- 1996: Mash J. Verona
- 1996–1997: Hapoel Eilat
- 1997–1998: Japan Energy Griffins
- 1999–2000: Maccabi Rishon LeZion
- 2000–2003: Maccabi Haifa
- 2003–2004: Long Beach Jam

Coaching
- 2003–2004: Long Beach Jam (assistant)
- 2005: Long Beach Jam
- 2006–2007: Phoenix Mercury (assistant)
- 2007–2013: Phoenix Mercury
- 2013: Phoenix Suns (assistant)
- 2015–2016: Phoenix Suns (assistant)
- 2016–2018: New York Knicks (assistant)
- 2019–2021: Washington Wizards (assistant)
- 2022–2025: Japan Men (associate head coach)
- 2025–present: Japan Women

Career highlights
- As player: ABA champion (2004); 4× Israeli League Assists Leader (1999, 2001–2003); CBA assists leader (1990); Second-team Parade All-American (1983); McDonald's All-American (1983); As coach: WNBA champion (2009)

Career NBA statistics
- Points: 248 (3.1 ppg)
- Rebounds: 69 (0.9 rpg)
- Assists: 247 (3.1 apg)
- Stats at NBA.com
- Stats at Basketball Reference

Corey Yasuto Gaines (born June 1, 1965) is an American professional basketball coach and former player, who is the head coach for the Japan women's national basketball team. He played five seasons in the NBA, and was a four-time Israeli Premier League Assists Leader, in 1999 and in 2001 to 2003. He was also a former head coach of the Phoenix Mercury of the Women's National Basketball Association (WNBA).

== Professional career ==
Gaines was selected by the Seattle SuperSonics in the 3rd round (65th overall) of the 1988 NBA draft. A 6-foot-3-inch (1.91 m) guard from UCLA and Loyola Marymount University, Gaines played in 5 NBA seasons for 4 different teams. He played for the New Jersey Nets (1988–89), Philadelphia 76ers (1989–90, 1994–95), Denver Nuggets (1990–91) and New York Knicks (1993–94). In his NBA career, he played in 80 games and scored a total of 248 points. Throughout his NBA career, he also spent time playing in Continental Basketball Association for multiple teams.

Gaines also played in multiple international basketball leagues (including the Japanese professional men's basketball league) throughout the late 1990s and early 2000s. He was a four-time Israeli Premier League Assists Leader, in 1999 and in 2001 to 2003. The last team he played for was the Long Beach Jam under the revived American Basketball Association. The Jam won the ABA Championship in their first season of existence, thanks in part to having players like Dennis Rodman on their squad.

== Coaching career ==
After winning the ABA Championship, Gaines would retire from playing basketball and start out as an assistant coach for the Long Beach Jam in their second year of existence. During the season, he would take over the head coach role there after their previous coach would accept a coaching role in the NBA. After the Jam's second season ended, it was announced that the Long Beach Jam would not play the next season due to their eventual move to Bakersfield in order to complete their transition to the NBA Development League. As a result, he would soon be an assistant coach for the Phoenix Mercury for the 2006 and 2007 seasons. On November 7, 2007, Gaines became the head coach of the Phoenix Mercury, replacing outgoing head coach Paul Westhead. Gaines had prior experience with Westhead's offense, having played for him at Loyola Marymount University and with the Nuggets. Gaines kept the same offense that Westhead employed, and in 2009, he directed the Mercury to their second WNBA title. Under Gaines' guidance, Diana Taurasi became the second player in WNBA history to win the regular season scoring title, the WNBA MVP Award, the WNBA Championship, and the WNBA Finals MVP Award in the same season.

In November 2011, Gaines was promoted to general manager of the Mercury, taking over a position vacated by Ann Meyers-Drysdale. On August 8, 2013, the Phoenix Mercury announced that they had relieved Gaines of his duties as head coach and general manager, and named former University of Arizona and Grand Canyon University men's basketball head coach Russ Pennell as the team's interim head coach.

Gaines would have his first coaching experience in the NBA with the Phoenix Suns as a player development coach, starting back in the 2010–11 season. In January 2013, Gaines was temporarily promoted to being an assistant head coach for the Phoenix Suns alongside Dan Panaggio after both Dan Majerle and Elston Turner would resign from their roles after the announcement of Lindsey Hunter being the team's interim head coach. He would then continue working under the organization throughout the rest of the 2012-13 NBA season until the Suns hired permanent replacement assistant head coaches to replace their old coaching staff, although Gaines would still work for the organization as a player development coach alongside Irving Roland during the 2013–14 and 2014–15 seasons. However, on July 30, 2015, Gaines would end up being promoted back as a full-time assistant coach for the Suns for the 2015-16 NBA season due to some changes with the coaching and player development staffs respectively. Gaines would also be considered a prime candidate for the interim coach tag for the Suns after head coach Jeff Hornacek was fired on February 1, 2016. However, after a generally awful season that was even worse than their 2012–13 season, Gaines would not have his contract renewed with the team.

Before the start of the 2016–17 season, Gaines would reunite with head coach Jeff Hornacek and assistant coach Jerry Sichting as an assistant coach for the New York Knicks. Prior to the start of the 2018–19 season, the Detroit Pistons hired Gaines as a Coaching Consultant. Before the start of the 2019–20 season, Gaines was hired as an assistant coach with the Washington Wizards.

Gaines served as a coach for the Japan men's national basketball team at the 2023 FIBA Basketball World Cup and the 2024 Summer Olympics. In January 2025, Japanese news media reported that Gaines was set to be named as the head coach of the Japan women's national basketball team.

== Career playing statistics ==
Legend
GP	Games played	GS	Games started	MPG	Minutes per game
FG%	Field goal percentage	3P%	3-point field goal percentage	FT%	Free throw percentage
RPG	Rebounds per game	APG	Assists per game	SPG	Steals per game
BPG	Blocks per game	PPG	Points per game	**Bold**	Career high

=== NBA ===
==== Regular season ====
Year	Team	GP	GS	MPG	FG%	3P%	FT%	RPG	APG	SPG	BPG	PPG
1988–89	New Jersey	**32**	0	10.5	.422	.200	.750	.6	2.1	.5	.0	2.1
1989–90	Philadelphia	9	0	9.0	.333	**.500**	.250	.6	2.9	.4	.0	1.1
1990–91	Denver	10	2	22.6	.400	.238	.846	1.4	**9.1**	**1.0**	**.2**	**8.3**
1993–94	New York	18	0	4.3	.450	.400	**.867**	.7	1.7	.1	.0	1.8
1994–95	Philadelphia	11	**8**	**25.5**	**.471**	.133	.455	**1.6**	3.0	.7	.1	5.0
Career		80	10	12.5	.424	.229	.736	.9	3.1	.5	.1	3.1

==== Playoffs ====
Year	Team	GP	GS	MPG	FG%	3P%	FT%	RPG	APG	SPG	BPG	PPG
1994	New York	4	0	7.0	.000	.000	–	.5	.5	.0	.0	.0

== Head coaching record ==
Team	Year	G	W	L	W–L%	Finish	PG	PW	PL	PW–L%	Result
Phoenix	2008	34	16	18	.471	6th in Western	—	—	—	—	Missed playoffs
Phoenix	2009	34	23	11	.676	1st in Western	11	7	4	.636	Won WNBA Championship
Phoenix	2010	34	15	19	.441	2nd in Western	4	2	2	.500	Lost Conference finals
Phoenix	2011	34	19	15	.559	3rd in Western	5	2	3	.650	Lost Conference finals
Phoenix	2012	34	7	27	.206	6th in Western	—	—	—	—	Missed playoffs
Phoenix	2013	21	10	11	.476	(left mid-season)	—	—	—	—	—
Career		191	90	101	.471		20	11	9	.550	

== Personal life ==
Gaines' father is African-American and his mother is of Japanese descent.
