= Alexis Gray-Lawson =

American basketball player (born 1987)

Personal information
- Born: April 21, 1987 (age 39) Oakland, California
- Listed height: 5 ft 8 in (1.73 m)
- Listed weight: 180 lb (82 kg)

Career information
- High school: Oakland Tech (Oakland, California)
- College: California (2005–2010)
- WNBA draft: 2010: 3rd round, 30th overall pick
- Drafted by: Washington Mystics
- Playing career: 2011–2012
- Position: Guard
- Number: 21
- Coaching career: 2015–present

Career history

Playing
- 2011–2012: Phoenix Mercury

Coaching
- 2015–present: Como Park Girls Basketball

Career highlights
- Frances Pomeroy Naismith Award (2010); Pac-12 All-Defensive Team (2010); 3x All Pac-12 (2008-2010); Pac-12 Freshman of the Year (2006); Pac-12 All-Freshman Team (2006); McDonald's All-American (2005)
- Stats at WNBA.com
- Stats at Basketball Reference
Medals
Women's basketball
Representing the United States
World University Games
Gold medal – first place	2009 Belgrade	Team

Alexis Amber Gray-Lawson (born April 21, 1987) is a basketball player who most recently played for the Phoenix Mercury of the Women's National Basketball Association. She was the 2010 recipient of the Frances Pomeroy Naismith award, which is presented by the WBCA annually to 'the nation's most outstanding NCAA Division I female basketball player who stands 5'8" tall or under".

== Early life and education ==
Gray-Lawson was born in Oakland, California to Orlando Gray and Roslyn Lawson. She has eight siblings, Kameron, Kenya, Layce, Violet, Vanessa, Kevin, William, and Kenny. Jason Kidd is a close family friend. She is related to Willie McGee who played for the St. Louis Cardinals.

== High school career ==
Gray-Lawson went to Oakland Tech for her entire high school career, and earned the 2005 second team Parade All-American and All-State Honors as she and California teammate Devanei Hampton led Oakland Tech to their second state title. She was ranked 17th nationally by the Blue Star Index and 25th by Mike White's All-Star Girls Report. She was listed as 5th by the NorCal Scouting Report. She was MVP of the 2004 California state Championships, named to the 2005 McDonald's All-American game, and the Senior Slam All-Star game in 2005. Oakland Tech retired her jersey, as they lost only one home game while she was there. She also played softball, earning three all-city honors and league MVP as a senior with the softball team. She competed on the volleyball team as a freshman as well.

== College career ==
Gray-Lawson spent a total of five years at the University of California, Berkeley. During her sophomore year she would play only nine games before suffering a season-ending injury. She would be red-shirted for the remainder of her sophomore season. Gray-Lawson was on the All-Pac-10 First Team in 2009 and 2010, the Pac-10 All-Defensive team in 2010, All-Pac-10 Second Team in 2008, Pac-10 All-Freshmen Team in 2006, All-Pac-10 Honorable Mention in 2006, and was the Pac-10 Freshman of the Year in 2006. She was named to the Women's Basketball News Service All-Freshman Team in 2006, Associated Press All-American Honorable Mention in 2009, and was a WNIT Champion in 2010. She was first on the California Golden Bears career list for three-pointers made with a total of 148, and named one of the top five 2-guards in the nation by ESPN.com in a 2008-2009 women's basketball preseason ranking.

== USA Basketball ==
Gray-Lawson was named a member of the team representing the U.S. at the 2009 World University Games held in Belgrade, Serbia. The team won all seven games to earn the gold medal. Gray-Lawson averaged 7.9 points per game and 4.3 rebounds per game.

== Professional career ==
=== WNBA ===
Gray-Lawson was selected the third round of the 2010 WNBA draft (30th overall) by the Washington Mystics. She was cut prior to the season. The Phoenix Mercury signed Gray-Lawson to a training camp contract and she would make the team. She played in 27 games with the Mercury, scoring her first WNBA career points on June 24, 2011, in Atlanta.

=== International career ===
Gray-Lawson went to play for Samsun Basketbol in the Turkish Women's League during the 2010-2011 off-season after she was waived by the Washington Mystics. For her second year overseas, following her rookie season with the WNBA she is playing in Israel with H. R. Le-Zion for 2011–2012.

== Coaching career ==
In 2015 Gray-Lawson was named the Como Park Girls basketball head coach. In 2020 Gray-Lawson was named the Saint Joseph Notre Dame High School girls head varsity coach.

== Career statistics ==
Legend
GP	Games played	GS	Games started	MPG	Minutes per game	RPG	Rebounds per game
APG	Assists per game	SPG	Steals per game	BPG	Blocks per game	PPG	Points per game
TO	Turnovers per game	FG%	Field-goal percentage	3P%	3-point field-goal percentage	FT%	Free-throw percentage
**Bold**	Career best	°	League leader

=== WNBA ===
==== Regular season ====
WNBA regular season statistics
Year	Team	GP	GS	MPG	FG%	3P%	FT%	RPG	APG	SPG	BPG	TO	PPG
2010	Did not play (waived)												
2011	Phoenix	**27**	0	11.4	**39.8**	**34.9**	**82.1**	0.7	**1.3**	0.2	0.0	**0.8**	3.9
2012	Phoenix	19	0	**16.7**	29.4	15.8	73.1	**2.0**	1.2	**0.4**	**0.2**	0.9	**4.5**
**Career**	2 years, 1 team	46	0	13.6	34.1	25.9	77.8	1.3	1.3	0.3	0.1	0.8	4.1

==== Playoffs ====
WNBA playoff statistics
Year	Team	GP	GS	MPG	FG%	3P%	FT%	RPG	APG	SPG	BPG	TO	PPG
2011	Phoenix	2	0	7.0	16.7	100.0	50.0	1.0	0.5	0.0	0.0	1.0	2.0
**Career**	1 year, 1 team	2	0	7.0	16.7	100.0	50.0	1.0	0.5	0.0	0.0	1.0	2.0

=== College ===
NCAA statistics
Year	Team	GP	Points	FG%	3P%	FT%	RPG	APG	SPG	BPG	PPG
2005-06	California	30	438	41.9	38.9	62.0	3.9	2.7	1.4	0.1	14.6
2006-07	California	9	95	**44.7**	26.1	75.0	2.9	**3.1**	**1.7**	-	10.6
2007-08	California	34	392	40.9	**40.0**	67.8	3.8	2.4	1.4	0.1	11.5
2008-09	California	34	415	42.8	38.0	**75.8**	3.8	3.0	1.3	0.1	12.2
2009-10	California	**36**	**640**	39.9	31.8	72.5	**5.1**	1.8	1.2	0.1	**17.8**
**Career**		143	1980	41.3	36.1	70.1	4.1	2.5	1.3	0.1	13.8
