= Nicole Ohlde =

American basketball player (born 1982)

Personal information
- Born: March 13, 1982 (age 44) Clay Center, Kansas, U.S.
- Listed height: 6 ft 5 in (1.96 m)
- Listed weight: 189 lb (86 kg)

Career information
- High school: Clay Center Community (Clay Center, Kansas)
- College: Kansas State (2000–2004)
- WNBA draft: 2004: 1st round, 6th overall pick
- Drafted by: Minnesota Lynx
- Playing career: 2004–2010
- Position: Power forward / center
- Number: 30

Career history
- 2004–2008: Minnesota Lynx
- 2009–2010: Phoenix Mercury
- 2010: Tulsa Shock

Career highlights
- WNBA champion (2009); 2× All-American – Kodak, United States Basketball Writers Association (2003, 2004); 2× Big 12 Player of the Year (2003, 2004); 2× First-team All-American – AP (2003, 2004); First-team All-Big 12 (2002, 2003, 2004); Big 12 Freshman of the Year (2001)
- Stats at WNBA.com
- Stats at Basketball Reference

Nicole Katherine Ohlde (born March 13, 1982) is an American former professional basketball player who played for the Minnesota Lynx, Phoenix Mercury and Tulsa Shock of the Women's National Basketball Association (WNBA).

== College career ==
Born in Clay Center, Kansas, Ohlde played collegiately at Kansas State University, where she was a two-time, first-team All-American (2003, 2004). She left Kansas State as the school's all-time leader in points, rebounds, and blocked shots.

Ohlde majored in social science while at Kansas State.

== Kansas State statistics ==
Legend
GP	Games played	GS	Games started	MPG	Minutes per game
FG%	Field goal percentage	3P%	3-point field goal percentage	FT%	Free throw percentage
RPG	Rebounds per game	APG	Assists per game	SPG	Steals per game
BPG	Blocks per game	PPG	Points per game	**Bold**	Career high

Year	Team	GP	Points	FG%	3P%	HK%	RPG	APG	SPG	BPG	PPG
2000–01	Kansas State	27	464	50.1	0.0	67.2	8.1	1.7	**1.5**	0.6	17.2
2001–02	Kansas State	**34**	610	**57.9**	–	65.2	7.7	2.8	1.4	2.0	17.9
2002–03	Kansas State	**34**	**625**	57.3	**20.0**	67.3	**9.0**	3.2	0.9	1.9	**18.4**
2003–04	Kansas State	31	542	57.0	–	**69.4**	6.7	**3.8**	0.8	1.7	17.5
Career	Kansas State	126	2241	55.7	11.1	67.3	7.9	2.9	1.2	1.6	17.8

== Professional career ==
In the 2004 WNBA draft, Ohlde was selected by the Minnesota Lynx in the first round (sixth overall). As a rookie, Ohlde averaged 11.7 points, 5.7 rebounds and 1.8 assists per game. She averaged 11.2 points, 5.7 rebounds and 2.3 assists per game in 2005. In 2006, her production dipped to 9.6 points, 5.6 rebounds and 1.6 assists per game. She spent most of the season playing center, rather than her natural power forward position.

On January 30, 2009, Ohlde was traded to the Phoenix Mercury for Kelly Miller and LaToya Pringle. She won the 2009 WNBA title as a member of the Mercury.

On July 23, 2010, Ohlde was traded from Phoenix to the Tulsa Shock along with a 2011 first-round draft pick in exchange for Kara Braxton.

She announced her retirement from the league prior to the 2011 season.

== WNBA career statistics ==
Legend
GP	Games played	GS	Games started	MPG	Minutes per game	RPG	Rebounds per game
APG	Assists per game	SPG	Steals per game	BPG	Blocks per game	PPG	Points per game
TO	Turnovers per game	FG%	Field-goal percentage	3P%	3-point field-goal percentage	FT%	Free-throw percentage
**Bold**	Career best	°	League leader

†	Denotes seasons in which Ohlde won a WNBA championship

=== Regular season ===
Year	Team	GP	GS	MPG	FG%	3P%	FT%	RPG	APG	SPG	BPG	TO	PPG
2004	Minnesota	**34**	**34**	29.9	.442	.000	.706	5.7	1.8	0.5	1.3	2.2	**11.7**
2005	Minnesota	**34**	**34**	**30.5**	.355	.000	.817	5.7	**2.3**	0.6	0.6	2.5	11.2
2006	Minnesota	**34**	**34**	25.6	.453	.000	.664	5.6	1.6	0.6	0.7	2.2	9.6
2007	Minnesota	**34**	**34**	27.1	.374	.000	**.845**	**6.1**	1.6	0.5	0.6	2.4	11.5
2008	Minnesota	**34**	**34**	16.4	.453	.000	.785	3.3	1.3	0.3	0.6	1.5	5.8
2009^{†}	Phoenix	21	0	14.8	**.535**	.000	.717	2.8	0.3	0.2	1.0	1.4	5.2
2010	Phoenix	20	0	11.1	.442	.000	.609	1.9	0.5	0.2	0.4	0.8	3.0
2010	Tulsa	12	9	25.1	.443	.000	.773	3.8	1.4	**0.7**	**0.8**	2.2	7.9
Career	7 years, 3 team	223	179	23.5	.437	.000	.755	4.7	1.5	0.4	0.8	1.9	8.8

=== Playoffs ===
Year	Team	GP	GS	MPG	FG%	3P%	FT%	RPG	APG	SPG	BPG	TO	PPG
2004	Minnesota	2	2	**37.0**	.478	.000	**.600**	**5.0**	**4.5**	**0.5**	0.0	3.0	**14.0**
2009^{†}	Phoenix	**11**	0	13.6	**.636**	.000	.200	2.7	0.4	0.4	**0.3**	0.9	2.6
Career	2 years, 2 team	13	2	17.2	.556	.000	.467	3.1	1.0	0.4	0.2	1.2	4.4

== Accomplishments ==
- Kodak All-American (2004, 2003)
- AP First Team All-American (2004, 2003)
- USBWA All-American (2004, 2003)
- Big 12 Conference Player of the Year (2003, 2004)
- All-Big 12 First Team (2004, 2005, 2006)
- All-Big 12 Third Team (2001)
- Big 12 Freshman of the Year (2001)
- Academic All-Big 12 first team (2004, 2003, 2002)
- Kansas State's all-time leading scorer (2161), rebounder (970), and shot blocker (201)
- Two-time gold medalist as a member of the USA Basketball World Championships for Young Women team (2003, 2002)
- Named to the 2006 USA Basketball Senior National Team for the USA's March 17–24 European Tour
- Member of the 2009 WNBA Championship team (Phoenix Mercury)
