= Ketia Swanier =

American basketball player (born 1986)

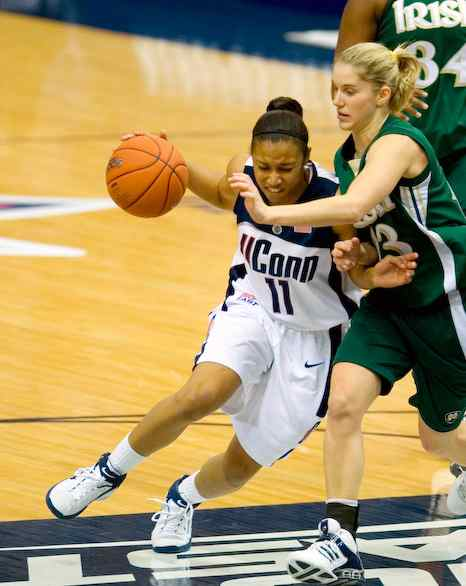

Free agent
- Position: Guard

Personal information
- Born: August 10, 1986 (age 40) Columbus, Georgia, U.S.
- Listed height: 5 ft 7 in (1.70 m)
- Listed weight: 150 lb (68 kg)

Career information
- High school: Columbus (Columbus, Georgia)
- College: UConn (2004–2008)
- WNBA draft: 2008: 1st round, 12th overall pick
- Drafted by: Connecticut Sun
- Playing career: 2008–present

Career history
- 2008: Connecticut Sun
- 2009–2011: Phoenix Mercury
- 2012: Atlanta Dream

Career highlights
- WNBA champion (2009); Big East Sixth Player of the Year (2008)
- Stats at WNBA.com
- Stats at Basketball Reference

Naketia Marie "Ketia" Swanier (born August 10, 1986) is an American professional basketball player born in Columbus, Georgia. She most recently played the guard position for the Atlanta Dream in the WNBA.

== College career ==
Swanier was the only freshman to open the season as UConn's starting point guard. She finished her career as the only player in UConn history to rank among the top 10 career leaders in games played, assists and steals. Swanier won the inaugural Big East Sixth Man of the Year Award as a senior coming off the bench behind Renee Montgomery.

== Career statistics ==
Legend
GP	Games played	GS	Games started	MPG	Minutes per game	RPG	Rebounds per game
APG	Assists per game	SPG	Steals per game	BPG	Blocks per game	PPG	Points per game
TO	Turnovers per game	FG%	Field-goal percentage	3P%	3-point field-goal percentage	FT%	Free-throw percentage
**Bold**	Career best	°	League leader

=== WNBA career statistics ===
==== Regular season ====
Year	Team	GP	GS	MPG	FG%	3P%	FT%	RPG	APG	SPG	BPG	TO	PPG
2008	Connecticut	25	**6**	9.2	27.7	23.3	80.0	1.2	1.0	0.6	0.0	**0.8**	1.6
2009	Phoenix	33	0	11.8	37.5	33.3	**88.9**	1.6	1.6	0.5	**0.1**	1.4	2.8
2010	Phoenix	32	0	10.1	**39.1**	**38.7**	52.4	1.2	1.7	**0.3**	0.0	1.3	**3.0**
2011	Phoenix	29	4	**14.8**	34.2	28.6	68.8	**1.9**	**2.3**	**0.8**	0.0	1.7	2.7
2012	Phoenix	**34**	2	11.4	31.7	16.7	73.1	1.4	1.9	0.4	0.0	1.2	2.2
Career	5 years, 2 teams	153	12	11.5	34.8	28.3	71.4	1.4	1.7	0.5	0.0	1.3	2.5

==== Playoffs ====
Year	Team	GP	GS	MPG	FG%	3P%	FT%	RPG	APG	SPG	BPG	TO	PPG
2009	Phoenix	**9**	0	**10.1**	29.6	36.4	0.0	1.0	**1.4**	0.2	0.0	0.8	2.2
2010	Phoenix	2	0	4.5	33.3	0.0	0.0	0.0	0.0	0.0	0.0	**0.0**	1.0
2011	Phoenix	5	0	9.4	33.3	0.0	0.0	**2.0**	1.2	**0.6**	0.0	0.2	1.2
2012	Phoenix	2	0	3.0	**66.7**	**50.0**	0.0	0.0	0.0	0.0	0.0	**0.0**	**2.5**
Career	4 years, 2 teams	18	0	8.5	33.3	29.4	0.0	1.1	1.1	0.3	0.0	0.4	1.8

=== College career statistics ===
Legend
GP	Games played	GS	Games started	MPG	Minutes per game
FG%	Field goal percentage	3P%	3-point field goal percentage	FT%	Free throw percentage
RPG	Rebounds per game	APG	Assists per game	SPG	Steals per game
BPG	Blocks per game	PPG	Points per game	**Bold**	Career high

Year	Team	GP	Points	FG%	3P%	FT%	RPG	APG	SPG	BPG	PPG
2004-05	Connecticut	31	78	42.1	25.0	43.8	1.5	2.2	1.4	-	2.5
2005-06	Connecticut	37	139	47.4	26.5	62.9	2.2	3.0	1.8	-	3.8
2006-07	Connecticut	36	189	**48.1**	27.3	**82.8**	2.2	**4.1**	**1.9**	0.1	5.3
2007-08	Connecticut	**38**	**268**	43.9	**37.5**	72.4	**3.1**	4.0	1.8	0.1	**7.1**
Career	Connecticut	142	674	45.5	32.1	67.9	2.3	3.4	1.7	0.0	4.7

== WNBA career ==
Swanier was selected 12th overall by the Connecticut Sun in the 2008 WNBA draft. She played in 25 of 34 possible games, with 6 starts. She ranked 14th in the league in steals per 40 minutes (2.24). On June 1 Swanier was waived by the Connecticut Sun because of the 11-woman roster cuts. The next day she was signed by the Phoenix Mercury.

== Overseas career ==
She is currently playing for KS JAS FBG Sosnowiec in Poland during the 2008–09 WNBA off-season.

== See also ==
- 2008 WNBA draft
