= Sidney Spencer =

American basketball player (born 1985)

Free agent
- Position: Shooting guard / small forward

Personal information
- Born: March 7, 1985 (age 41) Hoover, Alabama, U.S.
- Listed height: 6 ft 3 in (1.91 m)
- Listed weight: 183 lb (83 kg)

Career information
- High school: Hoover (Hoover, Alabama)
- College: Tennessee (2003–2007)
- WNBA draft: 2007: 2nd round, 25th overall pick
- Drafted by: Los Angeles Sparks

Career history
- 2007–2009: Los Angeles Sparks
- 2009–2011: New York Liberty
- 2011: Phoenix Mercury

Career highlights
- WNBA All-Rookie Team (2007); NCAA champion (2007); SEC All-Freshman Team (2004); Alabama Miss Basketball (2003)
- Stats at WNBA.com
- Stats at Basketball Reference

Sidney Spencer (born March 7, 1985) is an American professional basketball player who most recently played for the Phoenix Mercury of the WNBA.

Born in Hoover, Alabama, Spencer attended the University of Tennessee, and in April 2007 led the team to the national championship. That same month, she was selected in the second round of the WNBA draft by the Los Angeles Sparks. She got off to an exceptional start in her rookie season, and as a fan favorite quickly worked her way into the team's starting line-up.

== Early life ==
Sidney Spencer was born March 7, 1985, to Stephen and Janice Spencer. She has two brothers, Brad and Scott.

== High school career ==
Spencer received the 2003 Alabama Miss Basketball award. A product of Hoover, Alabama. she was selected as a 2003 Adidas All-American. She was also honored as 2003 "Miss Basketball" by the Alabama Sports Writers Association (ASWA). Sidney was chosen as the ASWA 6A Player of the Year in 2003 for the second-consecutive season. Also selected as the Gatorade Alabama Player of the Year her senior year. She was named all-state in 2002 and 2003. She was recognized by Street and Smith's Magazine as an honorable mention All-American in 2002. She concluded her high school career by establishing Hoover H.S. records with 1,743 points, 1,098 rebounds and 304 blocks. Also compiled 255 career steals and averaged a career double-double (16.3 ppg and 10.3 rpg). In addition to basketball, she earned two letters with the volleyball team and served as captain one season.

== Tennessee ==
2003–04: As a rookie, she played in all 35 games and averaged 5.5 ppg and 3.5 rpg. She logged 16.8 minutes per contest as one of the Lady Vols' top reserves. She became the 19th Lady Vol all-time to be named to the All-SEC Freshman Team. Earned UT Dean's List honors every semester and was selected to the All-SEC Academic Team.

2004–05: Missed much of the season after suffering a torn ACL in her right knee during practice on Feb. 23. Earned Dean's List honors after recording a 3.64 GPA in sport management during the fall. Earned a spot on the Lady Vol Honor Roll and named to the SEC All-Academic Team.

2005–06: Chosen to the SEC All-Tournament Team after averaging 13.0 ppg in the three contests and shot 69 percent from beyond the arc in the SEC Tournament. She was named to the ESPN The Magazine Academic All-District IV Third Team and earned SEC All-Academic honors for the third straight season.

== Career statistics ==
Legend
GP	Games played	GS	Games started	MPG	Minutes per game	RPG	Rebounds per game
APG	Assists per game	SPG	Steals per game	BPG	Blocks per game	PPG	Points per game
TO	Turnovers per game	FG%	Field-goal percentage	3P%	3-point field-goal percentage	FT%	Free-throw percentage
**Bold**	Career best	°	League leader

=== WNBA career statistics ===
==== Regular season ====
Year	Team	GP	GS	MPG	FG%	3P%	FT%	RPG	APG	SPG	BPG	TO	PPG
2007	Los Angeles	**34**	**22**	**24.4**	39.3	43.9	88.1	**4.1**	**1.2**	**0.8**	**0.3**	1.0	**9.6**
2008	Los Angeles	33	2	13.7	40.6	38.3	94.4	1.9	0.5	0.4	0.1	0.7	5.3
2009	New York	33	0	10.3	38.6	38.6	100.0	1.2	0.5	0.2	0.0	0.3	3.0
2010	New York	20	0	8.4	**51.2**	53.3	0.0	0.8	0.3	0.3	0.0	0.4	2.6
2011	New York	24	0	7.4	44.0	43.8	100.0	0.8	0.5	0.0	0.0	0.1	2.3
2011	Phoenix	8	0	8.1	31.3	**75.0**	100.0	0.6	0.8	0.0	0.0	**0.0**	1.9
Career	6 years, 3 teams	144	24	13.6	40.7	41.8	91.8	1.9	0.6	0.4	0.1	0.5	4.9

==== Playoffs ====
Year	Team	GP	GS	MPG	FG%	3P%	FT%	RPG	APG	SPG	BPG	TO	PPG
2008	Los Angeles	**5**	0	**9.6**	**25.0**	0.0	**100.0**	**1.8**	0.2	0.0	**0.2**	0.6	**1.4**
2010	New York	3	0	2.3	0.0	0.0	0.0	0.3	0.0	0.0	0.0	0.3	0.0
2011	Phoenix	2	0	2.5	0.0	0.0	0.0	0.5	0.0	**0.5**	0.0	**0.0**	0.0
Career	3 years, 3 teams	10	0	6.0	18.8	0.0	100.0	1.1	0.1	0.1	0.1	0.4	0.7

=== College career statistics ===
Legend
GP	Games played	GS	Games started	MPG	Minutes per game
FG%	Field goal percentage	3P%	3-point field goal percentage	FT%	Free throw percentage
RPG	Rebounds per game	APG	Assists per game	SPG	Steals per game
BPG	Blocks per game	PPG	Points per game	**Bold**	Career high

Year	Team	GP	Points	FG%	3P%	FT%	RPG	APG	SPG	BPG	PPG
2003–04	Tennessee	35	191	43.6	28.9	78.6	3.5	0.9	0.4	0.2	5.5
2004–05	Tennessee	25	129	39.2	35.0	80.0	4.0	0.7	0.6	**0.6**	5.2
2005–06	Tennessee	36	338	**45.8**	**43.4**	**92.5**	3.4	1.3	0.8	0.3	9.4
2006–07	Tennessee	**37**	**430**	42.1	39.7	90.0	**4.2**	**1.1**	**1.1**	0.3	**11.6**
Career	Tennessee	133	1088	43.0	39.6	85.3	3.8	1.0	0.7	0.3	8.2
