= Vaida Sipavičiūtė =

Lithuanian basketball player (born 1985)

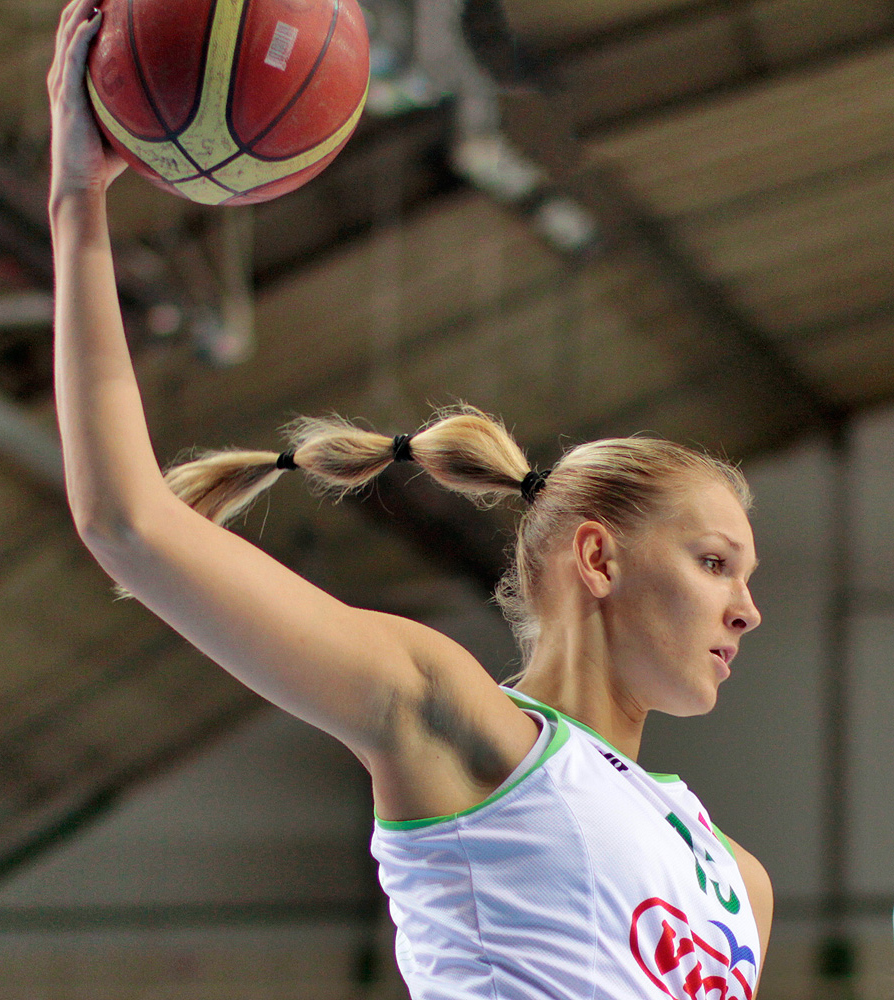

Club Atletico Faenza
- Position: Center

Personal information
- Born: November 6, 1985 (age 41) Kaunas, Lithuanian SSR, Soviet Union
- Listed height: 1.91 m (6 ft 3 in)

Vaida Sipavičiūtė (born November 6, 1985) is a Lithuanian professional basketball player. She plays for Club Atletico Faenza (Italy) and Lithuania women's national basketball team. She has represented national team in EuroBasket Women 2011 competition. She has spent 4 years in Syracuse Orange team.

== Clubs ==
- 2005–2008: Syracuse Orange (NCAA)
- 2008–2009: Arras Pays d'Artois Basket Féminin (LFB)
- 2009–2010: Szeviep Szeged (Hungary)
- 2010–2011: Tarbes (LFB)
- 2011: Club Atletico Faenza (Italy)
- 2011–2012: VICI Aiste Kaunas (Lithuania)
