= 2005 Washington Mystics season =

- Head coach: Richie Adubato
- Arena: MCI Center

Results
- Record: 16–18 (.471)
- Place: 5th (Eastern)
- Playoff finish: Did not qualify

The 2005 WNBA season was the eighth for the Washington Mystics. The Mystics gave it their all, but they fell short for the playoffs, losing a tiebreaker to the Detroit Shock.

== Offseason ==
=== WNBA draft ===
Round	Pick	Player	Nationality	School/Club team
1	6	Temeka Johnson (G)	United States	LSU
2	19	Erica Taylor (G)	United States	Louisiana Tech
3	32	Tashia Morehead (F)	United States	Florida

== Regular season ==
=== Season standings ===
Eastern Conference	W	L	PCT	GB	Home	Road	Conf.
Connecticut Sun ^{x}	26	8	.765	–	14–3	12–5	13–7
Indiana Fever ^{x}	21	13	.618	5.0	14–3	7–10	14–6
New York Liberty ^{x}	18	16	.529	8.0	10–7	8–9	9–11
Detroit Shock ^{x}	16	18	.471	10.0	12–5	4–13	11–9
Washington Mystics ^{o}	16	18	.471	10.0	10–7	6–11	9–11
Charlotte Sting ^{o}	6	28	.176	20.0	5–12	1–16	4–16

=== Season schedule ===
Date	Opponent	Score	Result	Record
May 21	@ Charlotte	60-42	Win	1-0
May 22	Connecticut	67-69	Loss	1-1
May 26	Los Angeles	75-84	Loss	1-2
June 1	New York	68-77	Loss	1-3
June 3	Minnesota	74-71	Win	2-3
June 5	@ New York	58-61	Loss	2-4
June 7	@ San Antonio	62-71	Loss	2-5
June 10	Seattle	64-52	Win	3-5
June 11	@ Minnesota	60-78	Loss	3-6
June 18	Indiana	88-78 (2OT)	Win	4-6
June 21	Phoenix	77-56	Win	5-6
June 24	@ Detroit	69-55	Win	6-6
June 26	Sacramento	57-62	Loss	6-7
June 28	@ Charlotte	66-61 (OT)	Win	7-7
June 30	Charlotte	65-50	Win	8-7
July 7	Detroit	62-76	Loss	8-8
July 13	@ Seattle	78-71	Win	9-8
July 15	@ Phoenix	66-77	Loss	9-9
July 16	@ Sacramento	59-73	Loss	9-10
July 19	@ Los Angeles	74-68	Win	10-10
July 21	@ Houston	70-65	Win	11-10
July 26	Houston	65-83	Loss	11-11
July 28	San Antonio	73-58	Win	12-11
July 29	@ Indiana	58-62	Loss	12-12
August 2	Charlotte	65-63	Win	13-12
August 7	Indiana	61-60	Win	14-12
August 11	Connecticut	65-80	Loss	14-13
August 14	@ Connecticut	77-80	Loss	14-14
August 16	@ New York	66-72	Loss	14-15
August 18	@ Indiana	57-67	Loss	14-16
August 21	@ Detroit	52-66	Loss	14-17
August 23	New York	82-69 (OT)	Win	15-17
August 26	@ Connecticut	47-81	Loss	15-18
August 27	Detroit	76-67	Win	16-18

== Player stats ==
Player	GP	REB	AST	STL	BLK	PTS
Alana Beard	30	130	90	45	9	422
Chasity Melvin	34	199	25	31	14	397
DeLisha Milton-Jones	33	172	58	57	18	394
Temeka Johnson	34	104	177	44	1	315
Charlotte Smith	34	128	71	22	11	246
Coco Miller	34	59	44	26	3	153
Laurie Koehn	30	11	10	2	0	113
Murriel Page	34	83	25	15	9	108
Nakia Sanford	27	45	6	10	11	88
Kaayla Chones	12	6	1	1	0	14
Tamicha Jackson	8	6	10	5	0	9
Kiesha Brown	2	0	0	2	0	2
Mactabene Amachree	3	0	0	0	0	2

== Awards and honors ==
- Temeka Johnson, WNBA Rookie of the Year Award
