= Brittany Spears (basketball) =

American basketball player

Personal information
- Born: September 27, 1988 (age 38) Pasadena, California, U.S.
- Listed height: 6 ft 1 in (1.85 m)

Career information
- High school: Pasadena (Pasadena, California); Notre Dame Prep (Fitchburg, Massachusetts)
- College: Colorado (2007–2011)
- WNBA draft: 2011: 2nd round, 19th overall pick
- Drafted by: Phoenix Mercury
- Playing career: 2011–present
- Position: Forward

Career history
- 2011: Soller Joventud Mariana
- 2012: Hapoel Rishon LeZion
- 2012–2013: Energa Toruń
- 2013–2014: Eisvögel USC Freiburg
- 2014–2015: Ciudad de los Adelantados

Career highlights
- First-team All-Big 12 (2011); Big 12 All-Freshman Team (2008)
- Stats at Basketball Reference

Brittany Lynnette Spears (born September 27, 1988) is an American basketball player and former guard for the University of Colorado women's basketball team. At 6'1", Spears averaged 18 points and eight rebounds in her senior season for the Buffaloes. During her four years at Colorado, Spears scored 2,185 points and averaged 17 points per game for her career, which is seventh-best in the history of the Big 12. Spears ranks first at CU in career field goals made, scoring average, 3-point attempts and minutes in game.

On April 11, 2011, the Phoenix Mercury chose Brittany Spears as their second round pick in the WNBA draft. The all-Big 12 Conference forward was taken with the 19th pick overall. Spears is the fourth CU women's basketball player to be drafted by the WNBA.

== Colorado statistics ==
Legend
GP	Games played	GS	Games started	MPG	Minutes per game
FG%	Field goal percentage	3P%	3-point field goal percentage	FT%	Free throw percentage
RPG	Rebounds per game	APG	Assists per game	SPG	Steals per game
BPG	Blocks per game	PPG	Points per game	**Bold**	Career high

Year	Team	GP	Points	FG%	3P%	FT%	RPG	APG	SPG	BPG	PPG
2007–08	Colorado	**34**	472	42.5	32.4	81.7	7.6	1.9	1.7	**1.5**	13.9
2008–09	Colorado	29	530	**43.4**	32.8	72.1	7.8	1.8	1.9	1.1	18.3
2009–10	Colorado	30	531	42.7	**35.7**	**83.7**	7.8	**2.0**	**2.1**	1.0	17.7
2010–11	Colorado	**34**	**652**	40.5	34.5	83.0	**8.1**	1.3	1.8	1.2	**19.2**
Career		127	2185	42.1	33.9	80.0	7.9	1.7	1.9	1.2	17.2
