= 2007 Los Angeles Sparks season =

- Head coach: Michael Cooper
- Arena: Staples Center

Results
- Record: 10–24 (.294)
- Place: 7th (Western)
- Playoff finish: Did not qualify

The 2007 Los Angeles Sparks season was the franchise's 11th season in the Women's National Basketball Association, and the sixth total season under head coach Michael Cooper, with the coach returning to the team after leaving in 2004 to coach in the NBA.

== Offseason ==
=== WNBA draft ===
Round	Pick	Player	Position	Nationality	College/HS/Club Team
2	25	Sidney Spencer		United States	Tennessee
3	38	Amanda Brown		Canada	Penn State

== Preseason ==
Date	Opponent	Score	Result	Record
May 8	@ Phoenix	91-71	Win	1-0
May 10	@ Indiana	81-76	Win	2-0
May 13	@ Minnesota	55-63	Loss	2-1

== Regular season ==
=== Season standings ===
Western Conference	W	L	PCT	GB	Home	Road	Conf.
Phoenix Mercury ^{x}	23	11	.676	–	12–5	11–6	17–5
San Antonio Silver Stars ^{x}	20	14	.588	3.0	9–8	11–6	13–9
Sacramento Monarchs ^{x}	19	15	.559	4.0	12–5	7–10	12–10
Seattle Storm ^{x}	17	17	.500	6.0	12–5	5–12	11–11
Houston Comets ^{o}	13	21	.382	10.0	7–10	6–11	10–12
Minnesota Lynx ^{o}	10	24	.294	13.0	7–10	3–14	8–14
Los Angeles Sparks ^{o}	10	24	.294	13.0	5–12	5–12	6–16

=== Season schedule ===
Date	Opponent	Score	Result	Record
May 22	@ Chicago	81-64	Win	1-0
May 24	@ Indiana	70-83	Loss	1-1
May 26	@ Connecticut	88-68	Win	2-1
June 2	@ Sacramento	85-88	Loss	2-2
June 8	Minnesota	90-87	Win	3-2
June 13	Houston	74-71	Win	4-2
June 15	@ Washington	89-80	Win	5-2
June 16	@ Minnesota	58-83	Loss	5-3
June 18	Detroit	73-79	Loss	5-4
June 20	@ Houston	64-74	Loss	5-5
June 22	Sacramento	96-88 (2OT)	Win	6-5
June 24	Seattle	71-83	Loss	6-6
June 27	Sacramento	74-66	Win	7-6
June 29	New York	68-80	Loss	7-7
July 1	Chicago	71-74 (OT)	Loss	7-8
July 3	@ Seattle	71-90	Loss	7-9
July 5	Indiana	56-57	Loss	7-10
July 7	Connecticut	89-110	Loss	7-11
July 10	Seattle	47-82	Loss	7-12
July 17	San Antonio	61-63	Loss	7-13
July 20	@ Phoenix	87-77	Win	8-13
July 24	@ Sacramento	59-67	Loss	8-14
July 27	@ Minnesota	76-85	Loss	8-15
July 29	@ Detroit	73-75	Loss	8-16
July 31	@ New York	73-63	Win	9-16
August 3	@ Houston	56-66	Loss	9-17
August 4	@ San Antonio	67-86	Loss	9-18
August 7	Phoenix	93-96	Loss	9-19
August 9	Washington	75-80	Loss	9-20
August 11	@ Phoenix	83-100	Loss	9-21
August 12	Minnesota	89-80	Win	10-21
August 14	San Antonio	77-84 (OT)	Loss	10-22
August 17	@ Seattle	77-97	Loss	10-23
August 19	Houston	72-82	Loss	10-24

== Player stats ==
Recipients	Award	Date awarded	Ref.
Sidney Spencer and Marta Fernandez	WNBA All-Rookie Team	September 5	

== Awards and honors ==
- Lisa Leslie, Best WNBA Player ESPY Award
