= Taylor Lilley =

American basketball player (born 1988)

Personal information
- Born: February 29, 1988 (age 38)
- Listed height: 5 ft 6 in (1.68 m)
- Listed weight: 130 lb (59 kg)

Career information
- High school: Hart (Santa Clarita, California)
- College: Oregon (2006–2010)
- WNBA draft: 2010: undrafted
- Position: Guard

Career history
- 2010: Phoenix Mercury

Career highlights
- All Pac-10 (2010); Third-team All Pac-10 (2008)
- Stats at Basketball Reference

Taylor Paige Lilley (born February 29, 1988) is an American professional basketball player in the WNBA.

After attending Hart High School (in Santa Clarita, California), she became a 4-year letterman for the University of Oregon Ducks. She garnered Pac-10 All-Freshman accolades for the 2006–07 season, and went on to Pac-10 All-Conference honors the following 3 years. Under new coach Paul Westhead, she had a break-out senior season (2009–2010) in which she led the team in scoring (a career best 17.5 points/game), finishing her career with 1,338 points (10th all-time in Oregon Duck history). She holds the Oregon single season record for three point shoot percentage (50.6%), and her 254 career three-pointers is the best in Oregon history and 4th best in Pac-10 history.

A free agent signing of the Phoenix Mercury, she made the team roster for 2010 season over the two draft picks of the year. She appeared in 21 games as a rookie. Per the Santa Clarita Signal, Lilley was recruited and signed by Mercury General Manager, Ann Meyers Drysdale. However, she would be cut during the pre-season of the 2011 season. In 2012, she played in Australia for the Northside Wizards. She continued on in Australia in 2013 with the Stirling Senators, where she won two SBL Player of the Week awards.

Currently, she is the women's basketball head coach at Oaks Christian School in Westlake Village, CA.

== Career statistics ==
Legend
| GP | Games played | GS | Games started | MPG | Minutes per game | RPG | Rebounds per game |
| APG | Assists per game | SPG | Steals per game | BPG | Blocks per game | PPG | Points per game |
| TO | Turnovers per game | FG% | Field-goal percentage | 3P% | 3-point field-goal percentage | FT% | Free-throw percentage |
| **Bold** | Career best | ° | League leader |

=== WNBA ===
==== Regular season ====
| Year | Team | GP | GS | MPG | FG% | 3P% | FT% | RPG | APG | SPG | BPG | TO | PPG |
|---|---|---|---|---|---|---|---|---|---|---|---|---|---|
| 2010 | Phoenix | 21 | 1 | 10.8 | 39.7 | 32.6 | 90.9 | 0.9 | 0.7 | 0.5 | 0.0 | 0.8 | 3.3 |
| Career | 1 year, 1 team | 21 | 1 | 10.8 | 39.7 | 32.6 | 90.9 | 0.9 | 0.7 | 0.5 | 0.0 | 0.8 | 3.3 |

==== Playoffs ====
| Year | Team | GP | GS | MPG | FG% | 3P% | FT% | RPG | APG | SPG | BPG | TO | PPG |
|---|---|---|---|---|---|---|---|---|---|---|---|---|---|
| 2010 | Phoenix | 2 | 0 | 3.0 | 33.3 | 0.0 | 0.0 | 0.5 | 0.5 | 0.0 | 0.0 | 0.0 | 1.0 |
| Career | 1 year, 1 team | 2 | 0 | 3.0 | 33.3 | 0.0 | 0.0 | 0.5 | 0.5 | 0.0 | 0.0 | 0.0 | 1.0 |

=== College ===
Legend
| GP | Games played | GS | Games started | MPG | Minutes per game |
| FG% | Field goal percentage | 3P% | 3-point field goal percentage | FT% | Free throw percentage |
| RPG | Rebounds per game | APG | Assists per game | SPG | Steals per game |
| BPG | Blocks per game | PPG | Points per game | **Bold** | Career high |

| Year | Team | GP | Points | FG% | 3P% | FT% | RPG | APG | SPG | BPG | PPG |
|---|---|---|---|---|---|---|---|---|---|---|---|
| 2006–07 | Oregon | 24 | 198 | 47.9 | **50.6** | 73.1 | 2.2 | 1.2 | 0.8 | 0.3 | 8.3 |
| 2007–08 | Oregon | 31 | 395 | 41.4 | 34.6 | **83.8** | 2.9 | 2.3 | 1.5 | 0.2 | 12.7 |
| 2008–09 | Oregon | 22 | 221 | 42.0 | 31.4 | 69.0 | 2.8 | **3.2** | 1.1 | 0.4 | 10.0 |
| 2009–10 | Oregon | **34** | **601** | **42.8** | 40.5 | 68.3 | **3.2** | 3.1 | **2.0** | **0.5** | **17.7** |
| Career | Oregon | 111 | 1415 | 42.9 | 38.5 | 72.9 | 2.8 | 2.5 | 1.4 | 0.3 | 12.7 |
