= Brooke Smith (basketball) =

American basketball player (born 1984)

Personal information
- Born: April 30, 1984 (age 42) San Anselmo, California, U.S.
- Listed height: 6 ft 3 in (1.91 m)
- Listed weight: 195 lb (88 kg)

Career information
- High school: Marin Catholic (Kentfield, California)
- College: Duke (2002–2003); Stanford (2004–2007)
- WNBA draft: 2007: 2nd round, 23rd overall pick
- Drafted by: Minnesota Lynx
- Position: Center

Career history
- 2008–2010: Phoenix Mercury

Career highlights
- 3× All Pac-10 (2005–2007); McDonald's All-American (2002)
- Stats at WNBA.com
- Stats at Basketball Reference
Medals
Women's basketball
Representing United States
World University Games
Gold medal – first place	2005 Izmir	Team

Brooke Smith (born April 30, 1984) is an American professional basketball player most recently in the WNBA.

== High school ==
Born in San Anselmo, California, Smith played for Marin Catholic High School in Kentfield, California, where she was named a WBCA All-American. She participated in the 2002 WBCA High School All-America Game where she scored eight points.

== College ==
Smith played her freshman year in college at Duke University in 2002–03. After sitting out a year, she played three years at Stanford and graduated in 2007. Following her collegiate career, she was selected 23rd overall in the 2007 WNBA draft by the Minnesota Lynx, but was released on April 26. On April 29, the Connecticut Sun signed Smith, only to waive her on May 11.

== Duke and Stanford statistics ==
Legend
GP	Games played	GS	Games started	MPG	Minutes per game
FG%	Field goal percentage	3P%	3-point field goal percentage	FT%	Free throw percentage
RPG	Rebounds per game	APG	Assists per game	SPG	Steals per game
BPG	Blocks per game	PPG	Points per game	**Bold**	Career high

Year	Team	GP	Points	FG%	3P%	FT%	RPG	APG	SPG	BPG	PPG
2002–03	Duke	25	85	53.1	–	65.4	2.5	0.4	0.4	0.4	3.4
2003–04	Stanford	Sat due to NCAA transfer rules									
2004–05	Stanford	**35**	465	**61.0**	–	67.7	5.5	1.9	0.9	1.3	13.3
2005–06	Stanford	34	**584**	57.6	–	77.9	7.5	3.1	1.1	**1.4**	**17.2**
2006–07	Stanford	34	471	50.4	**21.6**	**82.6**	**7.6**	**3.5**	**1.3**	1.1	13.9
Career	Combined	128	1605	55.9	20.5	75.2	6.0	2.4	0.9	1.1	12.5

== USA Basketball ==
Smith was a member of the team representing the USA at the 2005 World University Games Team in Izmir, Turkey. Smith averaged 5.0 points per game while helping the team to a 7–0 record, resulting in a gold medal at the event. Smith connected on 19 of her 24 shot attempts for a 79% shot percentage.

== Professional ==
She played for Virtus Viterbo in the Italian A-1 League for the 2007–08 season., Her 2007–2008 stats: Gescom Viterbo (ITA-A1,1T): 32 games: 14.6ppg, Reb-2(10.3rpg), 2.7spg, FGP: 52.0%, FT: 72.2%

Smith has played with the Phoenix Mercury since the 2008 season, winning the championship in 2009.

For two seasons she played with the Italian team Pool Comense. In her second season (2009–2010), she led the team in shooting with 17.53 points per game and was Italian A1 League Center of the year and league "First Team". In 2010–2011, Smith is playing for the current Italian title defending champions Cras Basket Taranto, replacing Rebekkah Brunson.
