= List of 2010 WNBA season transactions =

This is a list of all personnel changes for the 2010 WNBA off-season and 2010 WNBA season.

== Retirement ==
The following players played their final season in 2009.

Date	Team	Name	Position	Years pro
February 5, 2009	Los Angeles Sparks	Lisa Leslie	Center	12
May 15, 2009	Indiana Fever	Yolanda Griffith	Center	11
May 31, 2009	San Antonio Silver Stars	Vickie Johnson	Guard	13
September 18, 2009	Seattle Storm	Shannon Johnson	Guard	11
September 24, 2009	San Antonio Silver Stars	Erin Perperoglou	Guard	9
February 18, 2010	Indiana Fever	Tamecka Dixon	Guard	13
April 28, 2010	Seattle Storm	Chelsea Newton	Guard	5

== Front Office movement ==
=== Head coach changes ===
Coaches signed in off-season
Date	Team	Outgoing coach	New head coach	Previous position
September 29, 2009	Tulsa Shock	Rick Mahorn (Detroit)	Nolan Richardson	None
December 3, 2009	New York Liberty	Anne Donovan (interim)	Anne Donovan	Interim Coach of the Liberty
December 8, 2009	Minnesota Lynx	Jennifer Gillom	Cheryl Reeve	Assistant Coach of the Shock
January 7, 2010	Los Angeles Sparks	Michael Cooper	Jennifer Gillom	Head Coach of the Lynx
February 25, 2010	San Antonio Silver Stars	Dan Hughes	Sandy Brondello	Assistant Coach of the Silver Stars
In-season coaching change
Date	Team	Outgoing coach	Interim coach	Reason
None

=== General Manager changes ===
GM hired in off-season
Date	Team	Outgoing GM	New head GM	Previous position
September 29, 2009	Tulsa Shock	Cheryl Reeve (Detroit)	Nolan Richardson	None
In-season GM change
Date	Team	Outgoing GM	Interim GM	Reason
None

== Player movement ==
The following is a list of player movement via free agency and trades.

=== Trades ===
January 12, 2010
To Connecticut Sun

- Renee Montgomery
- 1st pick in 2010 draft
To Minnesota Lynx

- Lindsay Whalen
- 2nd pick in 2010 draft
February 19, 2010
To Minnesota Lynx

- right to swap second-round picks in 2011 Draft
To San Antonio Silver Stars

- Roneeka Hodges
- right to swap second-round picks in 2011 Draft
March 11, 2010
To Atlanta Dream

- Dalma Ivanyi
- right to swap second-round picks in 2011 Draft
To San Antonio Silver Stars

- Michelle Snow
- right to swap second-round picks in 2011 Draft
March 30, 2010
To New York Liberty

- Cappie Pondexter
- Kelly Mazzante
- Chicago's second-round pick in 2010 Draft
To Chicago Sky

- Shameka Christon
- Cathrine Kraayeveld
To Phoenix Mercury

- Candice Dupree
April 7, 2010
To Connecticut Sun

- Seventh pick in 2010 Draft
- Second-round pick in 2011 Draft
To Tulsa Shock

- Amber Holt
- Chante Black
April 8, 2010
To Connecticut Sun

- Draft rights to Kelsey Griffin
To Minnesota Lynx

- First- and second-round picks in 2011 Draft
April 14, 2010
To Tulsa Shock

- Shanna Crossley
To San Antonio Silver Stars

- Crystal Kelly
May 12, 2010
To New York Liberty

- Nikki Blue
To Washington Mystics

- Ashley Houts
May 14, 2010
To Los Angeles Sparks

- Kristi Toliver
To Chicago Sky

- Second-round pick in 2011 Draft
May 27, 2010
To Indiana Fever

- Shavonte Zellous
To Tulsa Shock

- Second-round pick in 2011 Draft
June 14, 2010
To New York Liberty

- Plenette Pierson
To Tulsa Shock

- Tiffany Jackson
July 23, 2010
To Phoenix Mercury

- Kara Braxton
To Tulsa Shock

- Nicole Ohlde
- First-round pick in 2011 Draft
July 26, 2010
To Minnesota Lynx

- Alexis Hornbuckle
To Tulsa Shock

- Rashanda McCants

=== Signed from free agency ===
Signed in the off-season
Player	Signed	New team	Former team
February
Kara Lawson	February 2	Connecticut Sun	Sacramento Monarchs
Anete Jekabsone-Zogota	February 2	Connecticut Sun	
Dominique Canty	February 2	Chicago Sky	
Ruth Riley	February 2	San Antonio Silver Stars	
Yelena Leuchanka	February 4	Atlanta Dream	
Chelsea Newton	February 4	Seattle Storm	Sacramento Monarchs
Seimone Augustus	February 9	Minnesota Lynx	
Ticha Penicheiro	February 9	Los Angeles Sparks	Sacramento Monarchs
Le'coe Willingham	February 9	Seattle Storm	Phoenix Mercury
Brooke Smith	February 9	Phoenix Mercury	
Kerri Gardin	February 10	Connecticut Sun	
LaToya Pringle	February 16	Los Angeles Sparks	Minnesota Lynx
Eshaya Murphy	February 16	Indiana Fever	
Lyndra Littles	February 16	Indiana Fever	
Josephine Owino	February 16	Indiana Fever	
Hamchetou Maiga-Ba	February 17	Minnesota Lynx	Sacramento Monarchs
Monique Currie	February 17	Washington Mystics	
La'Tangela Atkinson	February 17	Washington Mystics	
Jessica Moore	February 19	Indiana Fever	
Jessica Davenport	February 19	Indiana Fever	
Tan White	February 23	Connecticut Sun	
Quianna Chaney	February 24	San Antonio Silver Stars	
Lauren Ervin	February 25	Washington Mystics	
Jennifer Risper	February 25	Indiana Fever	
Erica White	February 25	Atlanta Dream	
Ashley Paris	February 26	Phoenix Mercury	
March
Jana Vesela	March 3	Seattle Storm	
Tasha Humphrey	March 9	San Antonio Silver Stars	Minnesota Lynx
Marion Jones	March 10	Tulsa Shock	
Natasha Lacy	March 10	Tulsa Shock	
Iciss Tillis	March 10	Tulsa Shock	
Demetress Adams	March 10	Atlanta Dream	
Shanna Crossley	March 10	San Antonio Silver Stars	
Lauren Jackson	March 11	Seattle Storm	
Katie Smith	March 16	Washington Mystics	Detroit Shock
Kristin Haynie	March 16	Washington Mystics	Sacramento Monarchs
Erika de Souza	March 16	Atlanta Dream	
Kelly Miller	March 17	Atlanta Dream	Minnesota Lynx
Coco Miller	March 17	Atlanta Dream	
Lanae Williams	March 17	Phoenix Mercury	
Davanei Hampton	March 17	Seattle Storm	
Carla Thomas	March 30	Washington Mystics	
April
Ivory Latta	April 1	Tulsa Shock	Atlanta Dream
Abby Bishop	April 1	Seattle Storm	
Laura Kurz	April 1	Seattle Storm	
Aja Parham	April 1	Seattle Storm	
Lindsey Wilson	April 6	Seattle Storm	
Deonna Davis	April 6	San Antonio Silver Stars	
Kristen Mann	April 7	Washington Mystics	
Loree Moore	April 14	Seattle Storm	New York Liberty
Penny Taylor	April 16	Phoenix Mercury	
Temeka Johnson	April 16	Phoenix Mercury	
Nikki Blue	April 19	Washington Mystics	
Ashley Robinson	April 20	Seattle Storm	
Heather Bowman	April 20	Seattle Storm	
Nuria Martinez	April 20	Minnesota Lynx	
Diana Delva	April 21	San Antonio Silver Stars	
Brittany Jackson	April 21	San Antonio Silver Stars	
Lacey Simpson	April 21	San Antonio Silver Stars	
Taj McWilliams	April 22	New York Liberty	Tulsa Shock
Ashley Ellis-Milan	April 22	Minnesota Lynx	
Brittany McCoy	April 22	Minnesota Lynx	
Vanessa Gidden	April 22	Minnesota Lynx	
Jessica Adair	April 22	Minnesota Lynx	
Edwige Lawson-Wade	April 22	San Antonio Silver Stars	
Svetlana Abrosimova	April 22	Seattle Storm	
Brandie Hoskins	April 23	New York Liberty	
Laine Selwyn	April 23	New York Liberty	
Tamara James	April 23	New York Liberty	
April Phillips	April 23	New York Liberty	
Katie Mattera	April 23	New York Liberty	Chicago Sky
Erica Williamson	April 23	New York Liberty	
Sha Brooks	April 23	Connecticut Sun	
Alicia Gladden	April 23	Connecticut Sun	
May Kotsopolous	April 23	Connecticut Sun	
Judie Lomax	April 23	Connecticut Sun	
Pauline Love	April 23	Connecticut Sun	
Kaitlin Sowinski	April 23	Connecticut Sun	
Ashley Battle	April 23	Indiana Fever	New York Liberty
Michelle Campbell	April 23	Indiana Fever	
Meredith Marsh	April 23	Indiana Fever	
Larissa Williams	April 25	Chicago Sky	
Kristi Cirone	April 25	Chicago Sky	
Sami Whitcomb	April 25	Chicago Sky	
Sandora Irvin	April 25	Chicago Sky	
Kailey Klein	April 26	Connecticut Sun	
Belinda Snell	April 28	San Antonio Silver Stars	
Christi Thomas	April 28	Tulsa Shock	
Jennifer Lacy	April 30	Washington Mystics	Atlanta Dream
May
Lisa Willis	May 11	Los Angeles Sparks	
Signed during the season
Player	Signed	New team	Former team
May
Chamique Holdsclaw	May 21	San Antonio Silver Stars	Atlanta Dream
June
Chanel Mokango	June 1	Los Angeles Sparks	
Ashley Walker	June 2	Tulsa Shock	
Kiesha Brown	June 8	Tulsa Shock	
Jennifer Lacy	June 8	Tulsa Shock	
Allie Quigley	June 9	San Antonio Silver Stars	
July
Crystal Kelly	July 4	San Antonio Silver Stars	
Allie Quigley	July 4		
Ivory Latta	July 5	Tulsa Shock	
Christi Thomas	July 7	Chicago Sky	
Crystal Kelly	July 13	San Antonio Silver Stars	
Joy Cheek	July 13	Indiana Fever	
Eshaya Murphy	July 22	Chicago Sky	
August
Kristen Mann	August 3	Minnesota Lynx	
Ashley Battle	August 11	San Antonio Silver Stars	

=== Released ===
==== Waived ====
Waived in the off-season
Player	Signed	Former team
March
Ivory Latta	March 22	Atlanta Dream
April
Loree Moore	April 6	New York Liberty
Kelly Mazzante	April 8	New York Liberty
Tamika Whitmore	April 15	Connecticut Sun
Katie Mattera	April 20	Chicago Sky
Ashley Battle	April 20	New York Liberty
Waived during the season
Player	Signed	Former team
May
Chamique Holdsclaw	May 19	Atlanta Dream
Belinda Snell	May 21	San Antonio Silver Stars
Allie Quigley	May 27	Indiana Fever
June
Tiffany Stansbury	June 1	Los Angeles Sparks
Amanda Thompson	June 8	Tulsa Shock
Ashley Walker	June 8	Tulsa Shock
Crystal Kelly	June 9	San Antonio Silver Stars
July
Natasha Lacy	July 5	Tulsa Shock
Abi Olajuwon	July 5	Chicago Sky
Allie Quigley	July 15	San Antonio Silver Stars
Sandora Irvin	July 22	Chicago Sky
August
Nuria Martinez	August 3	Minnesota Lynx

==== Renounced ====
Atlanta Dream

- Jennifer Lacy

Minnesota Lynx

- Tasha Humphrey

Seattle Storm

- Janell Burse

Tulsa Shock

- Cheryl Ford

==== Training camp cuts ====
All players here did not make the final roster

Atlanta Dream	Chicago Sky	Connecticut Sun	Indiana Fever	Los Angeles Sparks	Minnesota Lynx
Brigitte Ardossi; Tatum Brown; Shawn Goff; Chandi Jones; Britany Miller; Erica White	Kristi Cirone; Shyra Ely; Courtney Paris; Sami Whitcomb; Larrissa Williams	Sha Brooks; Alicia Gladden; Kailey Klein; May Kotsopoulos; Judie Lomax; Pauline Love; Kaitlin Sowinski	Ashley Battle; Michelle Campbell; Joy Cheek; Lyndra Littles; Armelie Lumanu; Meredith Marsh; Josephine Owino; Jennifer Risper; Christina Wirth	Karina Figueroa; Vanessa Hayden; Rashidat Junaid; Aisha Mohammed; LaToya Pringle; Angel Robinson; Lisa Willis	Jessica Adair; Ashley Ellis-Milan; Vanessa Gidden; Brittany McCoy
New York Liberty	Phoenix Mercury	San Antonio Silver Stars	Seattle Storm	Tulsa Shock	Washington Mystics
Brandie Hoskins; Tamara James; Erlana Larkins; Katie Mattera; Cory Montgomery; April Phillips; Laine Selwyn	Tyra Grant; Yuko Oga; Ashley Paris; Nyeshia Stevenson; Lanae Williams	Alysha Clark; Dee Davis; Diana Delva; Tasha Humphrey; Brittany Jackson; Alexis Rack; Krystal Vaughn	Heather Bowman; Devanei Hampton; Loree Moore; Aja Parham; Tanisha Smith; Ashley Walker; Lindsey Wilson	Moniquee Alexander; Vivian Frieson; Danielle Green; Brittany Gillam; Ivory Latta; Olayinka Sanni; Kim Sitzmann; Christi Thomas; Iciss Tillis; Junita Ward	La'Tangela Atkinson; Shanavia Dowdell; Lauren Ervin; Jennifer Lacy; Alexis Gray-Lawson; LeLe Hardy; Alysha Harvin; Ewilina Korbyn; Kristen Mann; Jenna Smith; Carla Thomas

== WNBA draft ==
The 2010 WNBA Draft was held on April 8, 2010, in Secaucus, New Jersey.

=== First round selections ===
Pick	Player	Nationality	WNBA Team	School/Club Team
1	Tina Charles	United States	Connecticut Sun (from N.Y, via L.A., via Minn.)	Connecticut
2	Monica Wright	United States	Minnesota Lynx (from Conn.)	Virginia
3	Kelsey Griffin	United States	Minnesota Lynx (traded to Conn.)	Nebraska
4	Epiphanny Prince	United States	Chicago Sky	Rutgers/Turkey
5	Jayne Appel	United States	San Antonio Silver Stars	Stanford
6	Jacinta Monroe	United States	Washington Mystics	Florida State
7	Danielle McCray	United States	Connecticut Sun (from Tul.)	Kansas
8	Andrea Riley	United States	Los Angeles Sparks	Oklahoma State
9	Chanel Mokango	Congo	Atlanta Dream	Mississippi State
10	Alison Lacey	Australia	Seattle Storm	Iowa State
11	Jené Morris	United States	Indiana Fever	San Diego State
12	Bianca Thomas	United States	Los Angeles Sparks (from Phx.)	Mississippi
