= 2005 Charlotte Sting season =

- Head coach: Trudi Lacey; Tyrone "Muggsy" Bogues (interim)
- Arena: Charlotte Coliseum

Results
- Record: 6–28 (.176)
- Place: 6th (Eastern)
- Playoff finish: Did not qualify

The 2005 WNBA season was the ninth season for the Charlotte Sting. The team finished the season with the worst record in the league. It was also the Sting's final season of play at the Charlotte Coliseum.

== Offseason ==
=== WNBA draft ===
Round	Pick	Player	Nationality	College/School/Team
1	1	Janel McCarville (C)	United States	Minnesota
2	24	Jessica Moore (C)	United States	Connecticut

== Regular season ==
=== Season standings ===
Eastern Conference	W	L	PCT	GB	Home	Road	Conf.
Connecticut Sun ^{x}	26	8	.765	–	14–3	12–5	13–7
Indiana Fever ^{x}	21	13	.618	5.0	14–3	7–10	14–6
New York Liberty ^{x}	18	16	.529	8.0	10–7	8–9	9–11
Detroit Shock ^{x}	16	18	.471	10.0	12–5	4–13	11–9
Washington Mystics ^{o}	16	18	.471	10.0	10–7	6–11	9–11
Charlotte Sting ^{o}	6	28	.176	20.0	5–12	1–16	4–16

=== Season schedule ===
Game	Date	Opponent	Result	Record
1	May 21	Washington	L 42–60	0–1
2	May 22	@ Indiana	L 58–68	0–2
3	May 26	Phoenix	L 58–68	0–3
4	May 28	Los Angeles	W 84–75	1–3
5	June 2	@ San Antonio	L 62–69	1–4
6	June 4	@ Minnesota	L 67–73	1–5
7	June 10	@ Detroit	L 55–69	1–6
8	June 12	Seattle	L 60–62	1–7
9	June 16	Indiana	L 57–60	1–8
10	June 23	San Antonio	L 49–64	1–9
11	June 25	New York	W 67–61	2–9
12	June 28	Washington	L 61–66 (OT)	2–10
13	June 30	@ Washington	L 50–65	2–11
14	July 2	@ Houston	L 65–75	2–12
15	July 7	Minnesota	W 66–58	3–12
16	July 12	@ Los Angeles	L 59–71	3–13
17	July 13	@ Phoenix	L 62–82	3–14
18	July 17	Houston	L 55–67	3–15
19	July 19	Connecticut	L 55–64	3–16
20	July 22	@ Connecticut	L 63–73	3–17
21	July 23	Indiana	L 46–63	3–18
22	July 26	@ Sacramento	L 54–64	3–19
23	July 29	@ Seattle	L 68–79	3–20
24	August 2	@ Washington	L 63–65	3–21
25	August 4	Sacramento	L 58–76	3–22
26	August 6	Detroit	W 82–73 (2OT)	4–22
27	August 9	@ Detroit	L 64–71	4–23
28	August 12	New York	L 74–82 (2OT)	4–24
29	August 14	@ New York	L 65–73	4–25
30	August 18	@ Connecticut	L 70–84	4–26
31	August 20	@ Indiana	L 53–62	4–27
32	August 23	Detroit	W 56–49	5–27
33	August 25	@ New York	W 78–66	6–27
34	August 27	Connecticut	L 69–78	6–28

== Player stats ==
Player	GP	REB	AST	STL	BLK	PTS
Tangela Smith	31	162	41	51	32	421
Sheri Sam	34	145	91	44	2	387
Tammy Sutton-Brown	34	179	14	30	37	318
Allison Feaster	21	37	51	14	2	192
Jia Perkins	30	44	32	29	9	150
Dawn Staley	23	53	121	30	0	146
Teana Miller	31	65	7	14	18	113
Helen Darling	31	47	83	41	0	107
Adrienne Goodson	10	35	6	3	1	70
Kelly Mazzante	27	31	7	9	0	64
Janel McCarville	28	76	11	12	7	50
Tynesha Lewis	10	20	13	3	3	47
Ayana Walker	9	18	6	2	2	12
Caity Matter	10	3	6	1	0	9
Kristen Rasmussen	3	5	2	1	0	6
Jessica Moore	6	5	2	0	0	3
