= 2010 Indiana Fever season =

Sports season

- Head coach: Lin Dunn
- Arena: Conseco Fieldhouse

Results
- Record: 21–13 (.618)
- Place: 3rd (Eastern)
- Playoff finish: Lost Conference Semifinals

Media
- Television: FS-I; NBATV, ESPN2

The 2010 WNBA season was the 11th season for the Indiana Fever of the Women's National Basketball Association.

== Transactions ==
=== Dispersal draft ===
Based on the Fever's 2009 record, they would pick 11th in the Sacramento Monarchs dispersal draft. The Fever waived their pick.

=== WNBA draft ===
The following are the Fever's selections in the 2010 WNBA draft.

Round	Pick	Player	Nationality	School/Team/Country
1	11	Jene Morris	United States	San Diego State
2	23	Armelie Lumanu	United States	Mississippi State
3	35	Joy Cheek	United States	Duke

=== Transaction log ===
- February 16: The Fever signed Eshaya Murphy, Lyndra Littles and Josephine Owino to training camp contracts.
- February 19: The Fever re-signed Jessica Moore and Jessica Davenport.
- February 25: The Fever signed Jennifer Risper to a training camp contract.
- April 23: The Fever signed Ashley Battle, Michelle Campbell and Meredith Marsh to training camp contracts.
- April 30: The Fever waived Lyndra Littles and Armelie Lumanu.
- May 6: The Fever waived Jennifer Risper, Meredith Marsh and Michelle Campbell.
- May 13: The Fever waived Josephine Owino and Ashley Battle.
- May 14: The Fever waived Joy Cheek and Christina Wirth.
- May 27: The Fever acquired Shavonte Zellous from the Tulsa Shock in exchange for a second-round pick in the 2011 Draft.
- July 11: The Fever waived Eshaya Murphy and signed Joy Cheek.

=== Trades ===
Date	Trade	
May 27, 2010	To Indiana Fever	To Tulsa Shock
May 27, 2010	Shavonte Zellous	Second-round pick in 2011 Draft

=== Free agents ===
==== Additions ====
Player	Signed	Former team
Eshaya Murphy	February 16, 2010	re-signed
Jessica Moore	February 19, 2010	re-signed
Jessica Davenport	February 19, 2010	re-signed
Allie Quigley	May 15, 2010	free agent
Shavonte Zellous	May 27, 2010	Tulsa Shock
Joy Cheek	July 11, 2010	free agent

==== Subtractions ====
Player	Left	New team
Tamecka Dixon	February 18, 2010	retired
Christina Wirth	May 14, 2010	free agent
Allie Quigley	May 27, 2010	free agent
Eshaya Murphy	July 10, 2010	free agent

== Roster ==
2010 Indiana Fever roster
Players
Coaches

Pos.	No.	Nat.	Name	Height	Weight	From
PG	41	(Australia)	Bevilaqua, Tully	5' 7" (1.7m)	145 lb (66kg)	Australia
SF	24	(United States)	Catchings, Tamika	6' 1" (1.85m)	167 lb (76kg)	Tennessee
F	21	(United States)	Cheek, Joy	6' 1" (1.85m)	201 lb (91kg)	Duke
C	50	(United States)	Davenport, Jessica	6' 5" (1.96m)	215 lb (98kg)	Ohio State
G/F	23	(United States)	Douglas, Katie	6' 0" (1.83m)	165 lb (75kg)	Purdue
PF	32	(United States)	Hoffman, Ebony	6' 2" (1.88m)	215 lb (98kg)	USC
PG	20	(United States)	January, Briann	5' 8" (1.73m)	160 lb (73kg)	Arizona State
F/C	31	(United States)	Moore, Jessica	6' 3" (1.91m)	175 lb (79kg)	Connecticut
G	10	(United States)	Morris, Jené	5' 9" (1.75m)	146 lb (66kg)	San Diego State
C	8	(Canada)	Sutton-Brown, Tammy	6' 4" (1.93m)	200 lb (91kg)	Rutgers
G	1	(United States)	Zellous, Shavonte	5' 10" (1.78m)	155 lb (70kg)	Pittsburgh

Head coach
(United States) Lin Dunn (UT Martin)
Assistant coaches
(United States) Gary Kloppenburg (UC San Diego)
(United States) Jim Lewis (West Virginia)
Athletic trainer
(United States) Craig Stull (Indianapolis)
Strength and conditioning coach
(United States) Brandon Johnson (Purdue)

Legend

- (C) Team captain
- (DP) Unsigned draft pick
- (FA) Free agent
- (S) Suspended
- Injured

WNBA roster page

=== Depth ===
Pos.	Starter	Bench
C	Tammy Sutton-Brown	Jessica Davenport
PF	Ebony Hoffman	Jessica Moore / Joy Cheek
SF	Tamika Catchings	Shavonte Zellous
SG	Katie Douglas	Jene Morris
PG	Tully Bevilaqua	Briann January

== Season standings ==
Eastern Conference	W	L	PCT	GB	Home	Road	Conf.
Washington Mystics ^{x}	22	12	.647	–	13–4	9–8	13–9
New York Liberty ^{x}	22	12	.647	–	13–4	9–8	14–8
Indiana Fever ^{x}	21	13	.618	1.0	13–4	8–9	13–9
Atlanta Dream ^{x}	19	15	.559	3.0	10–7	9–8	10–12
Connecticut Sun ^{o}	17	17	.500	5.0	12–5	5–12	9–13
Chicago Sky ^{o}	14	20	.412	8.0	7–10	7–10	7–15

== Schedule ==
=== Preseason ===
2010 Game Log: Preseason

Game	Date	Time (ET)	Opponent	Score	High points	High rebounds	High assists	Location/Attendance	Record
1	May 7	12:00pm	Chicago	69–63	Murphy (20)	Owino (11)	Battle (4)	Conseco Fieldhouse; 7,291	1–0
2	May 10	12:30pm	@ Chicago	71–84	Murphy (15)	Davenport (8)	Bevilaqua, January (4)	Allstate Arena; N/A	1–1

=== Regular season ===
2010 Game Log: Regular Season
May

Game	Date	Time (ET)	Opponent	TV	Score	High points	High rebounds	High assists	Location/Attendance	Record
1	May 15	7:00pm	Washington		65–72	Catchings, Sutton-Brown (12)	Sutton-Brown (6)	January (5)	Conseco Fieldhouse; 9,752	0–1
2	May 16	7:00pm	@ Atlanta	SSO	62–66	Catchings (18)	Sutton-Brown (9)	Douglas (6)	Philips Arena; 7,337	0–2
3	May 22	8:00pm	@ Chicago	CN100	92–86 (OT)	Catchings (28)	Murphy (10)	Douglas, Murphy (6)	Allstate Arena; 6,477	1–2
4	May 23	6:00pm	Chicago	FS-I; CN100	69–61	Murphy (16)	Murphy (9)	Douglas (4)	Conseco Fieldhouse; 7,665	2–2
5	May 29	8:00pm	@ Tulsa	FS-OK	74–79	Catchings (15)	Catchings (10)	Catchings (7)	BOK Center; 4,005	2–3

June

Game	Date	Time (ET)	Opponent	TV	Score	High points	High rebounds	High assists	Location/Attendance	Record
6	June 3	7:00pm	San Antonio	FS-I; FS-SW	79–57	Douglas (22)	Catchings (7)	Bevilaqua, Zellous (3)	Conseco Fieldhouse; 7,574	3–3
7	June 5	7:00pm	New York		78–73	Zellous (23)	Sutton-Brown (8)	Catchings (9)	Conseco Fieldhouse; 8,090	4–3
8	June 6	7:00pm	@ Minnesota	FS-N	89–51	Catchings (27)	Murphy (8)	Bevilaqua, Moore, Zellous (2)	Target Center; 6,444	5–3
9	June 11	7:30pm	@ Connecticut		77–86	Davenport (18)	Catchings (8)	Douglas (6)	Mohegan Sun Arena; 7,603	5–4
10	June 13	6:00pm	Connecticut		77–67	Douglas (20)	Catchings (13)	Douglas (3)	Conseco Fieldhouse; 7,302	6–4
11	June 17	7:00pm	Seattle	FS-I	72–65	Douglas (15)	Sutton-Brown (7)	Douglas (4)	Conseco Fieldhouse; 7,520	7–4
12	June 19	7:00pm	Atlanta		94–91	Castro Marques, McCoughtry (21)	Lyttle (20)	McCoughtry (5)	Conseco Fieldhouse; 8,187	8–4
13	June 25	10:00pm	@ Seattle		81–85	Douglas (29)	Catchings (5)	Catchings (5)	KeyArena; 9,083	8–5
14	June 27	6:00pm	@ Chicago	CN100	70–64	Hoffman (13)	Catchings (6)	Catchings, Douglas (4)	Allstate Arena; 4,051	9–5
15	June 29	7:00pm	@ Washington	ESPN2	65–68	Catchings (17)	Catchings, Douglas, Hoffman (4)	Douglas (5)	Verizon Center; 8,464	9–6

July

Game	Date	Time (ET)	Opponent	TV	Score	High points	High rebounds	High assists	Location/Attendance	Record
16	July 6	8:00pm	@ Chicago	CN100	58–51	Catchings (16)	Sutton-Brown (10)	January (5)	Allstate Arena; 3,732	10–6
17	July 8	7:00pm	Tulsa		100–72	Catchings (24)	Sutton-Brown (7)	January (6)	Conseco Fieldhouse; 7,077	11–6
18	July 14	1:00pm	Connecticut		68–77	Catchings (22)	Catchings (9)	Bevilaqua, January (3)	Conseco Fieldhouse; 10,076	11–7
19	July 16	7:00pm	Atlanta		89–70	Catchings (23)	Catchings (11)	Catchings, Douglas, January (4)	Conseco Fieldhouse; 7,532	12–7
20	July 18	4:00pm	@ New York	MSG	84–81 (OT)	Catchings (22)	Catchings (10)	Catchings (7)	Madison Square Garden; 9,508	13–7
21	July 22	7:00pm	Los Angeles	ESPN2	76–57	Hoffman (16)	Hoffman (8)	Catchings (6)	Conseco Fieldhouse; 7,898	14–7
22	July 24	7:00pm	@ Washington	NBATV; CSN-MA	78–73	January (19)	Catchings, Sutton-Brown (5)	January (8)	Verizon Center; 9,786	15–7
23	July 27	7:00pm	Chicago	CN100	78–74	Catchings (16)	Catchings (10)	Catchings (6)	Conseco Fieldhouse; 6,853	16–7
24	July 30	7:00pm	Washington		73–77	Catchings, Douglas (16)	4 players (4)	Catchings (7)	Conseco Fieldhouse; 8,207	16–8

August

Game	Date	Time (ET)	Opponent	TV	Score	High points	High rebounds	High assists	Location/Attendance	Record
25	August 1	3:00pm	@ Atlanta	NBATV; SSO	74–90	Catchings (24)	Davenport (12)	January (4)	Philips Arena; 6,270	16–9
26	August 3	7:00pm	New York	FS-I	72–82	Catchings (19)	Catchings (6)	Douglas, January (2)	Conseco Fieldhouse; 7,540	16–10
27	August 6	7:00pm	Atlanta		95–93	Catchings (30)	Catchings (8)	Douglas (5)	Conseco Fieldhouse; 9,214	17–10
28	August 8	6:00pm	@ Phoenix		104–82	Douglas (28)	Catchings (10)	Douglas (6)	US Airways Center; 10,995	18–10
29	August 10	10:00pm	@ Los Angeles	ESPN2	82–76	Sutton-Brown (18)	Catchings (11)	Bevilaqua (6)	STAPLES Center; 10,586	19–10
30	August 13	7:00pm	Phoenix		110–90	Catchings (29)	Catchings (7)	Catchings (6)	Conseco Fieldhouse; 10,002	20–10
31	August 15	5:00pm	@ Connecticut		79–66	Catchings (26)	Catchings (7)	Catchings (7)	Mohegan Sun Arena; 7,915	21–10
32	August 17	7:30pm	@ New York		57–78	Catchings (25)	Catchings, Sutton-Brown (5)	Catchings (3)	Madison Square Garden; 8,953	21–11
33	August 20	8:00pm	@ San Antonio		61–75	Catchings (15)	Catchings (7)	Catchings (4)	AT&T Center; 10,807	21–12
34	August 22	5:00pm	Minnesota	NBATV; FS-I	79–83 (OT)	Catchings (17)	Catchings (14)	January (7)	Conseco Fieldhouse; 10,015	21–13

All games are viewable on WNBA LiveAccess

=== Postseason ===
2010 Game Log: Postseason
Eastern Conference Semifinals

Game	Date	Time (ET)	Opponent	TV	Score	High points	High rebounds	High assists	Location/Attendance	Series
1	August 26	7:00pm	@ New York	NBATV; MSG	73–85	Catchings (18)	Davenport (8)	Catchings (6)	Madison Square Garden; 14,624	0–1
2	August 29	8:00pm	New York	ESPN2	75–67	Catchings (17)	Catchings (13)	Douglas (5)	Conseco Fieldhouse; 7,535	1–1
3	September 1	7:30pm	@ New York	NBATV; MSG	74–77	Douglas (24)	Catchings (6)	Douglas (4)	Madison Square Garden; 16,682	1–2

== Statistics ==
Legend
GP	Games played	GS	Games started	MPG	Minutes per game	RPG	Rebounds per game
APG	Assists per game	SPG	Steals per game	BPG	Blocks per game	PPG	Points per game
FG%	Field-goal percentage	3P%	3-point field-goal percentage	FT%	Free-throw percentage	TO	Turnovers per game
PF	Fouls per game		Team leader		League leader

=== Regular season ===
Player	GP	GS	MPG	FG%	3P%	FT%	RPG	APG	SPG	BPG	PPG
Tully Bevilaqua	34	27	19.4	.383	.338	.583	2.1	1.6	1.41	0.12	3.9
Tamika Catchings	34	34	31.4	.484	.448	.849	7.1	4.0	2.26	0.88	18.2
Joy Cheek	7	0	4.9	.417	.333	1.000	0.4	0.1	0.00	0.00	2.1
Jessica Davenport	33	0	14.2	.571	.143	.725	2.8	0.5	0.42	0.82	7.4
Katie Douglas	34	34	29.8	.449	.391	.831	3.4	3.3	1.35	0.38	13.7
Ebony Hoffman	34	33	24.0	.397	.317	.850	4.2	1.3	1.18	0.38	8.0
Briann January	30	7	21.9	.371	.356	.826	2.0	3.1	1.23	0.13	7.4
Jessica Moore	33	0	13.1	.427	.000	.833	2.1	0.4	0.18	0.12	3.1
Jene Morris	25	0	7.8	.424	.368	.667	0.6	0.5	0.32	0.08	2.9
Eshaya Murphy	15	1	14.7	.350	.263	.571	4.1	1.5	0.50	0.10	5.1
Allie Quigley	3	0	6.0	.500	.000	1.000	0.3	0.3	0.7	0.30	2.0
Tammy Sutton-Brown	34	34	25.7	.450	.000	.707	5.1	0.9	0.97	1.62	8.1
Shavonte Zellous	27	0	15.5	.362	.280	.747	2.1	1.3	0.44	0.59	5.9

=== Postseason ===
Player	GP	GS	MPG	FG%	3P%	FT%	RPG	APG	SPG	BPG	PPG
Tully Bevilaqua	3	3	22.0	.429	.444	.000	0.7	1.3	0.67	0.00	5.3
Tamika Catchings	3	3	35.7	.413	.357	.813	8.7	3.0	3.00	0.67	18.7
Jessica Davenport	3	0	15.3	.529	.000	1.000	5.3	0.0	0.67	1.33	7.0
Katie Douglas	3	3	31.7	.458	.333	.833	3.0	3.3	1.33	0.33	11.7
Ebony Hoffman	3	3	29.7	.333	.333	.875	4.7	1.3	1.00	1.00	11.0
Briann January	3	0	19.7	.313	.200	.900	1.3	2.0	0.33	0.00	6.7
Jessica Moore	3	0	5.3	.000	.000	.000	0.7	0.3	0.33	0.33	0.0
Jene Morris	1	0	2.0	.000	.000	.000	0.0	0.0	0.00	0.00	0.0
Tammy Sutton-Brown	3	3	30.0	.476	.000	.818	4.3	0.3	1.33	0.67	9.7
Shavonte Zellous	3	0	10.3	.600	.000	.857	0.7	0.7	0.00	0.33	4.0

== Awards and honors ==
- Tamika Catchings was named WNBA Eastern Conference Player of the Week for the week of July 10, 2010.
- Tamika Catchings was named WNBA Eastern Conference Player of the Week for the week of July 31, 2010.
- Tamika Catchings was named WNBA Eastern Conference Player of the Month for July.
- Tamika Catchings was named to the 2010 WNBA All-Star Team as a Team USA starter.
- Katie Douglas was named to the 2010 WNBA All-Star Team as a WNBA reserve.
- Tamika Catchings was named to the All-Defensive First Team.
- Tully Bevilaqua was named to the All-Defensive Second Team.
- Katie Douglas was named to the All-Defensive Second Team.
- Tamika Catchings was named Defensive Player of the Year.
- Tamika Catchings was awarded the Kim Perrot Sportsmanship Award.
- Tamika Catchings was named to the All-WNBA First Team.
- Katie Douglas was named to the All-WNBA Second Team.
