= Kentucky Athletic Hall of Fame =

The Kentucky Athletic Hall of Fame is a sports hall of fame for the U.S. state of Kentucky established in 1963. Individuals are inducted annually at a banquet in Louisville and receive a bronze plaque inside Louisville's Freedom Hall. The Kentucky Athletic Hall of Fame other wise known as the Kentucky Sports Hall of fame, is a non-profit organization funded by the Kentucky Lottery and owned and operated by the Louisville Sports Commission.

== Notable inductees ==
Honorees have included Louisville native Muhammad Ali. (Note: born Cassius Marcellus Clay Jr) A three-time world champion and six-time Golden Glove recipient, he won a gold medal in the light heavyweight division at the 1960 Summer Olympics (at age eighteen) and turned professional later that year. Also included is American football player and coach Bo McMillin (who played for Centre College in Danville, Kentucky); and basketball player and coach Pat Riley, who played in college for the Kentucky Wildcats men's basketball team. While at the University of Kentucky, Riley managed to average a double double during his entire career there. He is also a ten-time NBA champion, winning one ring as a player with the Los Angeles Lakers and the rest as a coach and an owner in the NBA. Coach Riley was inducted into the Hall of Fame in 2005. Bob Baffert an American racehorse trainer who trained the 2015 Triple Crown winner American Pharoah and 2018 Triple Crown winner Justify. Baffert's horses have won a record seven Kentucky Derbies, seven Preakness Stakes, three Belmont Stakes, and three Kentucky Oaks. Most recently inducted. A more recent inductee Dwane Casey inducted in the 2021 class who is the head coach for the Detroit Pistons of the National Basketball Association. He is a former NCAA basketball player and coach, having played and coached there for over a decade before moving on to the NBA.

The 2013 class included people such as Jerry Carroll who was a golf professional, Donna Bender a student-athlete/athletic director at Sacred Heart Academy, University of Louisville basketball player Pervis Ellison, Calvin Borel who was a Kentucky horse racer, Pro football player for the Pittsburgh Steelers Dwayne D. Woodruff, and Tennis player Julie Ditty.

Inducted in the 2015 class were tennis player Mel Purcell,( he captured the 1980 NCAA doubles title with Rodney harmon and was named an all-American.) women's basketball coach Paul Sanderford, basketball player Sharon Garland, college basketball manager and King of the Bluegrass Men's Basketball Tournament founder and director Lloyd Gardner, Major League Baseball umpire Randy Marsh, track and field athlete Boyd Smith, and Lexington's Keeneland Race Course. Scott Davenport, the current men's basketball coach at Bellarmine University was also inducted.

The 2016 class included American football player Shaun Alexander, basketball player Darel Carrier, college basketball coach Scott Davenport, basketball player Kyra Elzy, high school basketball coach Philip Haywood, Kentucky Wesleyan basketball play-by-play announcer Joel Utley, and the Lakeside Swim Club. Kyra Elzy is a Kentucky native and currently holds the position as the University of Kentucky's Women's Basketball Head Coach. She also played basketball for the University of Tennessee and assisted for their team after her career.

Class Year Inductions & Names
2013	2014	2015	2016	2017	2018	2019	2020
Calvin Borel	Susan Bradley-Cox	Lloyd Gardner	Shaun Alexander	Mike Battaglia	Bob Baffert	Derek Anderson	Pete Browning
Jerry Carroll	Charles "Red" Crabtree	Sharon Garland	Darel Carrier	Howard Beth	Sam Ball	Deion Branch	Anna May Hutchison
Julie Ditty	Stan Hardin	Randy Marsh	Scott Davenport	Rodger Bird	Bob Beatty	William Exum	Clarence "Cave" Wilson
Pervis Ellison	Bill Miller	Mel Purcell	Kyra Elzy	Rob Bromley	Bernie Bickerstaff	Ralph Hacker	
Alvin "Bo" McMillin	Paul Rogers	Paul Sanderford	Phillip Haywood	Swag Hartel	Nick Hayden	Willis Augustus Lee	
Donna Bender Moir	Rudell Stitch	Shandelier Boyd Smith	Joel Utley	Kenny Klein	Ken Ramsey	Nate Northington	
Judge Dwayne D. Woodruff	Valhalla Golf Club	Keeneland Race Course	Lakeside Swim Club	Dennis Lampley	Sarah Ramsey		
				Marion Miley			

== Selection committee ==
The 2026 Selection Committee has the following members:

- Jeff Bidwell, WPSD-TV
- C.L. Brown, Courier-Journal
- John Clay, Lexington Herlad-Leader
- Eric Crawford, WDRB Media
- Joe Danneman, Fox 19 Now
- Jon Hale, Lexington Herald-Leader
- Kendrick Haskins, WAVE 3
- Zack Klemme, HD Media
- Mark Mathis, Owensboro Messenger-Inquirer
- Marques Maybin, ESPN Radio
- Jeff Piecoro, ABC 36 WTVQ
- Natalie Pierre, Courier Journal
- Christi Thomas. SEC Network
- Bob Valvano, ESPN Radio
- Linda Younkin, The State Journal

== Inductees ==
The Hall of fame has been honoring athletes for the past 58 years. These are some of the athletes inducted in the past 6 years. Here is the link to the full list of inductees.

=== 2021 ===
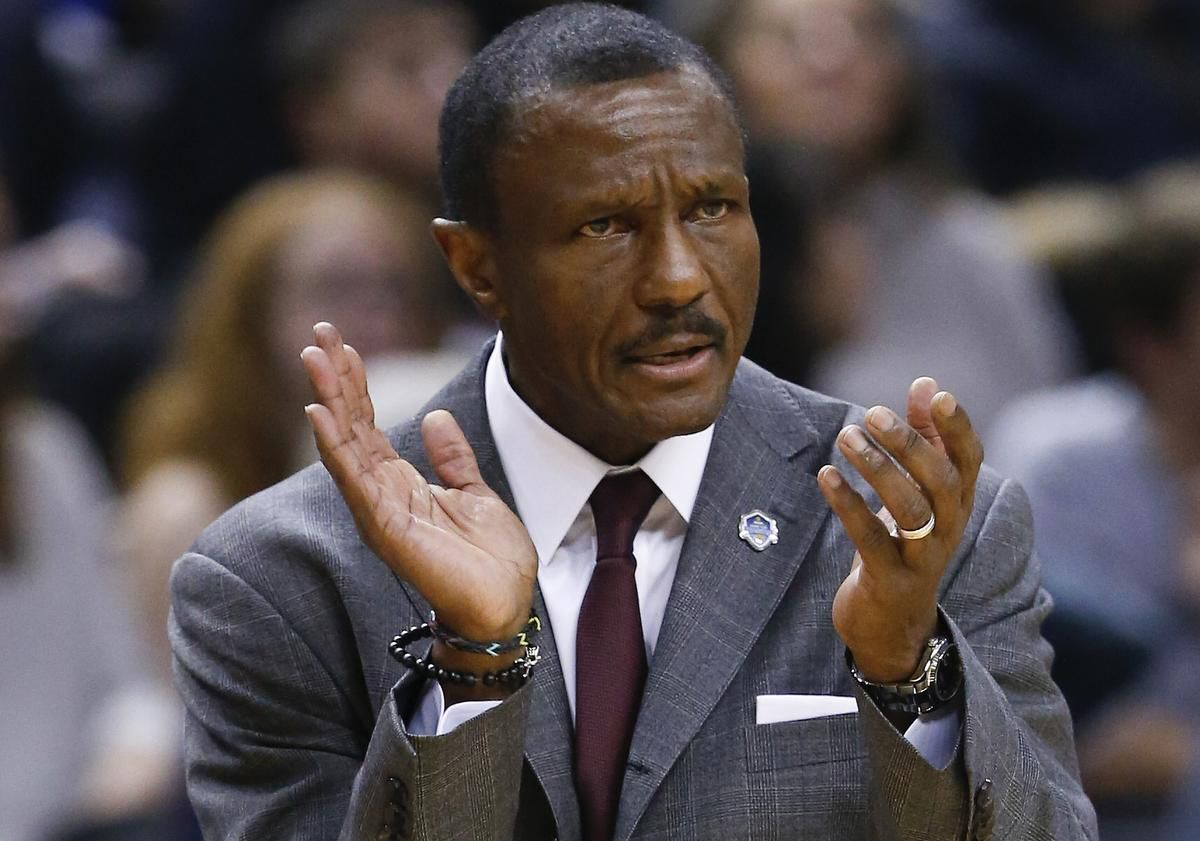

- John Asher – Kentucky Derby ambassador. He is known as the voice and face of horseracing in Kentucky.
- Dwane Casey – American Professional basketball coach who attended Union County High School in Morganfield, Kentucky and played four years at the University of Kentucky winning a National Championship in 1977–78. He began His coaching career at the Western Kentucky University before becoming the first African American assistant coach at The University of Kentucky, before moving to the NBA.
- Romeo Crennel – American football coach. Before becoming a defensive coordinator, he was a star at Western Kentucky, where he was a four-year starter and a team captain as a senior in 1969. He then embarked on his coaching career that spanned six decades and included five Super Bowl rings as an assistant.
- Rachel Komisarz Baugh – American swimmer, Olympic gold medalist, and former world record-holder. She swam at the University of Kentucky and became a seven-time All American swimmer and three-time SEC Champion by the end of her four years at the university.
- Keith Madison – Head coach of the Kentucky Wildcats baseball team from 1979 to 2003. He remains the most winningest baseball coach in program history with 735 wins.
- Elmore Smith – Former American professional basketball player. Played at Kentucky State University and went on to play in the NBA for the Buffalo Braves.

=== 2020 ===
- Pete Browning – American professional baseball player that was a pioneer for the major league games, which included several seasons with the Louisville Colonels.
- Anna May Hutchison – Louisville native, she played in the All-American Girls Professional Baseball League.
- Clarence "Cave" Wilson – Basketball player. Wilson led the Horse Cave, KY, Colored School to 65 consecutive basketball victories in the 1940s. He was a forward and a point guard for the Harlem Globetrotters (1949–1964)

=== 2019 ===
- Derek Anderson – American former professional basketball player. In 1996, Anderson helped the University of Kentucky win the NCAA Men's Basketball Championship as part of a team that featured nine future NBA players under their coach Rick Pitino, known as the “untouchables”
- Deion Branch – is a former American football player for the NFL. He played college football as a wide receiver at Louisville under coach John L. Smith. Branch was named the Most Valuable Player of Super Bowl XXXIX.
- William Exum was the head of the Kentucky State University Physical Education Department and later head of the Athletics Department. He coached the KSU men's cross country team to an NCAA Division II championship in 1964. He was also the manager of the United States Track and Field teams at the 1972 and 1976 Olympics.
- Ralph Hacker spent 34 years on the UK Radio Network. He served as the men's basketball analyst for many years with broadcaster Cawood Ledford
- Willis Augustus Lee was a Kentucky native and a skilled sport shooter that won seven medals in the 1920 Olympics shooting events, including five gold medals. He was tied with teammate Lloyd Spooner for the most anyone had ever received in a single Olympics. Their record stood for 60 years.
- Nate Northington – He was the first African-American to play in a college football SEC game with the Kentucky Wildcats.

=== 2018 ===
- Bob Baffert
- Sam Ball
- Bob Beatty
- Bernie Bickerstaff
- Ken Ramsey
- Nicky Hayden

=== 2017 ===
- Mike Battaglia
- Howard Beth
- Rodger Bird
- Rob Bromley
- Swag Hartel
- Kenny Klein
- Dennis Lampley
- Marion Miley

=== 2016 ===
- Shaun Alexander
- Darel Carrier
- Scott Davenport
- Kyra Elzy
- Philip Haywood
- Joel Utley
- Lakeside Swim Club

Inductees	Year of Induction	Hometown	College	Relevant Sport(s)
Randall Cobb	2025	Maryville, TN	University of Kentucky	Football
Carole Liedtke	2025	Louisville, KY	University of Louisville	Gymnastics
Tayshaun Prince	2025	Compton, CA	University of Kentucky	Basketball
Nora Martin Ross	2025	Paris, KY		Trap shooting
Teddy Bridgewater	2024	Miami, FL	University of Louisville	Football
Oscar Combs	2024	Jeff, KY	Cumberland College	Sports Writer
Tony Delk	2024	Covington, TN	University of Kentucky	Basketball
Roy Pickerill	2024	Louisville, KY	Kentucky Wesleyan College	Administration
Rick Bozich	2023	Gary, IN	Indiana University	Sports Writer
Brigid DeVries	2023	Lexington, KY	University of Kentucky	Administrator
Tom Leach	2023	Paris, KY	University of Kentucky	Broadcasting
Chris Lofton	2023	Maysville, KY	University of Tennessee	Basketball
Bubba Paris	2023	Louisville, KY	University of Michigan	Football
Mitch Barnhart	2022	Kansas City, KS	Ottawa University	Basketball
Michael Bush	2022	Louisville, KY	University of Louisville	Football
Sue Feamster	2022	Frankfort, KY	Kentucky State University	Athletic Director
Dallas Thornton	2022	Louisville, KY	Kentucky Wesleyan College	Basketball
Dwane Casey	2021	Morganfield, KY	University of Kentucky	Basketball
Elmore Smith	2021	Macon, GA	Kentucky State University	Basketball
John Asher	2021	Leitchfield, KY	Western Kentucky University	Horseracing
Keith Madison	2021	Brownsville, KY	Western Kentucky University	Baseball
Rachel Komisarz Baugh	2021	Warren, MI	University of Kentucky	Swim
Romeo Crennel	2021	Lynchburg, VA	Western Kentucky University	Football
Anna May Hutchison	2020	Louisville, KY	University of Wisconsin-Parkville	Baseball
Clarence "Cave" Wilson	2020	Horse Cave, KY	Tennessee State University	Basketball
Pete Browning	2020	Louisville, KY	–	Baseball
Derek Anderson	2019	Louisville, KY	University of Kentucky	Basketball
Deion Branch	2019	Albany, GA	University of Louisville	Football
Nate Northington	2019	Bowling Green, KY	University of Kentucky	Football
Ralph Hacker	2019	Richmond, KY	University of Kentucky	Football
Willis Augustus Lee	2019	Natlee, KY	Naval War College	Sport Shooter
William Exum	2019	Rock Island, IL	Kentucky State University	Track
Bernie Bickerstaff	2018	Benham, KY	University of Rio Grande	Basketball
Bob Baffert	2018	Nogales, AZ	University of Arizona	Horse Training
Bob Beatty	2018	Butler, MO	Missouri Southern State University	Football
Ken and Sarah Ramsey	2018	–	–	Horse Training
Nicky Hayden	2018			
Sam Ball	2018			
Dennis Lampley	2017			
Howard Beth	2017			
Kenny Klein	2017			
Marion Miley	2017			
Mike Battaglia	2017			
Rob Bromley	2017			
Rodger Bird	2017			
Swag Hartel	2017			
Darrell Carrier	2016			
Joel Utley	2016			
Kyra Elzy	2016			
Lakeside Swim Club	2016			
Philip Haywood	2016			
Scott Davenport	2016			
Shaun Alexander	2016			
Keeneland Race Course	2015			
Lloyd Gardner	2015			
Mel Purcell	2015			
Paul Sanderford	2015			
Randy Marsh	2015			
Shandelier Boyd Smith	2015			
Sharon Garland	2015			
Bill Miller	2014			
Charles "Redd" Crabtree	2014			
Paul Rogers	2014			
Rudell Stitch	2014			
Stan Hardin	2014			
Susan Bradley-Cox	2014			
Valhalla Golf Course	2014			
Alvin "Bo" McMillin	2013			
Calvin Borel	2013			
Donna Bender Moir	2013			
Judge Dwayne D. Woodruff	2013			
Jerry Carroll	2013			
Julie Ditty	2013			
Pervis Ellison	2013			
Angel McCoughtry	2012			
Booby Watson	2012			
Churchill Downs	2012			
Homer Rice	2012			
Hugh Durham	2012			
Lee Corso	2012			
Ricky Robey	2012			
Seth Hancock	2012			
Artis Gilmore	2011			
Bunny Daugherty	2011			
Ed Kallay	2011			
George Tinsley	2011			
Jerry May	2011			
Phil Roof	2011			
Rex Chapman	2011			
Cornelius "Buddy" Demling	2010			
Dan Neal	2010			
Donna Wise	2010			
Jeff Brohm	2010			
Lillie Mason (Stockton)	2010			
Michael Waltip	2010			
Mike Praff	2010			
Wilbur Hackett	2010			
Booby Keith	2009			
Dan Ulmer	2009			
Marty O'Toole	2009			
Mary Jean Wall	2009			
Mike Casey	2009			
Patti Jo Hedges-Ward	2009			
Travis "The Machine" Grant	2009			
Bob White	2008			
Dale Kindsey	2008			
Jaime Walz-Richey	2008			
Jamal Mashburn	2008			
Joe Federspiel	2008			
Joe Kendall	2008			
Tubby Smith	2008			
William S. Farish	2008			
Bill "Mr. Wildcat" Keightley	2007			
Chris Redman	2007			
Clarence "Big House" Gaines	2007			
DeJuan Wheat	2007			
Jeff Mullins	2007			
Kenny "Sky Walker" Walker	2007			
Myra Van Hoose Blackwelder	2007			
Ron Kordes	2007			
Secretariat	2007			
Tim Couch	2007			
Allan Houston	2006			
Bob Schneider	2006			
Clemette Haskins	2006			
Doug Flynn	2006			
Elmore Just	2006			
Hillerich and Bradsby	2006			
Jenny Hansen	2006			
Pat Riley	2006			
TOm Jurich	2006			
Adrian Smith	2005			
Art Still	2005			
Dr. Bob Davis	2005			
Darrell Wayne Luckus	2005			
Greg Page	2005			
Woodie Fryman	2005			
1974–75 Kentucky Colonels	2005			
Bill Spivey	2004			
Don Lane	2004			
Doug Buffone	2004			
Howard Crittenden	2004			
Jim McDaniels	2004			
Jimmy Feix	2004			
Tamara McKinney	2004			
Tom Meeker	2004			
Ukari Figgs Moore	2004			
Anne Combs	2003			
Dermontti Dawson	2003			
Jack Harbaugh	2003			
Johnny Meihaus	2003			
Kenny Davis	2003			
Roy. Bowling	2003			
Van Vance	2003			
Will Wolford	2003			
Alfred "Sonny" Collins	2002			
Danny Sullivan	2002			
Guy Strong	2002			
John Owens	2002			
Mo Moorman	2002			
Patricia Joen "Patti" Cooksey	2002			
Richie Farmer	2002			
Rodney McCray	2002			
Wes Strader	2002			
Bill Gatti	2001			
Billy Reed	2001			
Charles Ruter	2001			
Johnny Cox	2001			
Lee Rose	2001			
Lisa Harrison	2001			
Tom Hammond	2001			
Vernon Hatton	2001			
Wesley Cox	2001			
Bobby Nichols	2000			
Bud Olson	2000			
Gay Brewer	2000			
Jim Host	2000			
King Kelly Coleman	2000			
Lou Johnson	2000			
Pat Day	2000			
Torri Murden-McClure	2000			
Charles "Jock" Sutherland	1999			
Darrell Waltrip	1999			
Derrick Ramsey	1999			
Dwight Gahm	1999			
Joe Jacoby	1999			
Lea Wise Prewitt	1999			
Steve Cauthen	1999			
Wade Houston	1999			
Bill Olsen	1998			
Ellie Brown Moore	1998			
Frank Minnifield	1998			
George Blanda	1998			
John Tong	1998			
Larry Gilbert	1998			
Jim Bolus	1998			
John Y Brown	1998			
Susan Sloane-Lundy	1998			
Denny Crum	1997			
Derek Smith	1997			
Don Brumfield	1997			
Earl Cox	1997			
Gene Rhodes	1997			
Jim Green	1997			
Larry Conley	1997			
Phil Simms	1997			
Darrell Griffith	1996			
Don Fightmaster	1996			
Jim Reid	1996			
Kyle Macy	1996			
Paulie Miller	1996			
Steve Meilinger	1996			
Valerie Still	1996			
William T. Young	1996			
Bill Arnsparger	1995			
Cliff Barker	1995			
Donna Murphy	1995			
James Edward (Ted) Bassett, III	1995			
Karl Schmitt Sr.	1995			
Kenny Rollins	1995			
Otto Knop	1995			
Phil Rollins	1995			
Tom Thacker	1995			
Dicky Lyons	1994			
Frank Selvy	1994			
Geri Grigsby	1994			
Howard Schnellenberger	1994			
Ralph Kurcheval	1994			
Dr. Rudy Ellis	1994			
Tom Jackson	1994			
Bob Gain	1993			
Charles "Cotton" Nash	1993			
John Dromo	1993			
Lou Michaels	1993			
Mack Miller	1993			
Mary Terstegge Meagher	1993			
Ron King	1993			
Sam English	1993			
Alex Groza	1992			
Bobby Laughlin	1992			
Jeff Van Note	1992			
John Gaines	1992			
Mike Barry	1992			
Roy Kidd	1992			
Susie Shields White	1992			
Ulysses "Junior" Bridgeman	1992			
Charles Martin Newton	1991			
Dave Cowens	1991			
Don Gullett	1991			
Jack Givens	1991			
Johnny Unitas	1991			
Keene Daingerfield	1991			
Steve Hamilton	1991			
Vito "Babe" Parilli	1991			
Amos Martin	1990			
Clem Haskins	1990			
Dan Issel	1990			
Jack Ryan	1990			
Jerry Claiborne	1990			
Louie Dampier	1990			
Louise Wilson	1990			
Warner L. Jones Jr.	1990			
Arthur Boyd "Bull" Hancock Jr.	1989			
Garnis Martin	1989			
Jimmy Ellis	1989			
Joe B. Hall	1989			
Joe Fulks	1989			
John Turner	1989			
Sherman Lewis	1989			
Alfred "Butch" Beard	1988			
Betty Rowland Probasco	1988			
Billy Evans	1988			
David Russell "Gus" Bell	1988			
Letcher Norton	1988			
Mike Silliman	1988			
Paul "Bear" Bryant	1988			
Ralph Carlisle	1988			
Sanford T. Roach	1988			
Cawood Ledford	1987			
Charles Tyra	1987			
Clint Thomas	1987			
Eddie Arcaro	1987			
Harry Lancaster	1987			
Ted Hornback	1987			
William H. King	1987			
Jack Coleman	1986			
Jim Bunning	1986			
Joe Guyon	1986			
John Oldham	1986			
Paul McBrayer	1986			
Stella Gilb	1986			
Tommy Bell	1986			
Woody Stephens	1986			
Ben Allyn Jones	1985			
Frank Beard	1985			
Muhammad Ali	1985			
Ralph Beard	1985			
Westley Unseld	1985			
Bernard (Peck) Hickman	1975***			
Bernie Shively	1975			
Blanton Collier	1975			
Charles Talton "Turkey" Hughes	1975			
Claude Sullivan	1975			
Cliff Hagan	1975			
Earl Ruby	1975			
Frank Camp	1975			
Frank Ramsey Jr.	1975			
Leonard Lyles	1975			
Lou Tsioropoulos	1975			
Nick Denes	1975			
Paul Hornung	1975			
Theodore A. Sanford	1975			
Wathen R. Knebelkamp	1975			
William L. Kean	1975			
Eros Bolivar "Cy" Barger	1966**			
Raymond T. Baer	1966			
Adolph Frederick Rupp	1964*			
Edgar Allen Diddle	1964			
Samuel Paul Derringer	1964			
Albert Benjamin "Happy" Chandler	1963			
Charles "Uncle Charley" Moran	1963			
Colonel "Matt" Winn	1963			
Earle Combs	1963			
Ellis Johnson	1963			
Forrest Sale	1963			
Harold Reese	1963			
John Simms Kelly	1963			
Nathaniel John Cartmell	1963			
Roscoe Goose	1963			
Wallace Clayton "Wah Wah" Jones	1963			
William Anderson Alexander	1963			

*Selection on hiatus 1965

**Selection on hiatus 1967–1974

**Selection on hiatus 1976–1984
