= Jaime Walz Richey =

American basketball coach

Jaime Walz Richey (born 1977 or 1978) is the girls basketball coach at Fort Thomas Highlands High School since 2003. As a player at Fort Thomas, Jaime Walz reached the final of the Sweet Sixteen in 1994. She was Kentucky Miss Basketball and won a Gatorade Player of the Year in 1996. With her 4948 points, she held the KHSAA record in girls basketball from 1996 to 2016. During 2023, she remained in first for the KHSAA with 539 three-pointers and 1354 assists.

At Western Kentucky University, Walz played in the second round during the NCAA Division I women's basketball tournament during 1998 and 2000. She had the most assists in two seasons, most steals for one season, and scored 1044 points overall while at the university. At Highlands, Walz started out as an assistant coach during the early 2000s. As their coach, she reached 400 victories in 2022. In other positions, Walz Richey has worked in business as a teacher and chair for the school. She was selected for the Kentucky Athletic Hall of Fame in 2008.

== Early life and education ==
=== Childhood and high school ===
Walz grew up in Fort Thomas, Kentucky with three siblings after her birth during the late 1970s. During her childhood, she played baseball and basketball with boys. In 1990, Walz competed at the Elks National Hoop Shoot Finals. She competed in the 1991 Junior Olympics Basketball Championship with Ohio AAU in the 13U division. During the 1992 14U Championship in the AAU, Walz was an All-American with Cincinnati AAU. At the event, her team had a fifth place tie. Additional All-America selections were in the 16U event with Northern Kentucky Hustle during 1994 and the 18U event with Team Kentucky the following year.

During grade seven, Walz joined the basketball team at Fort Thomas Highlands High School. At the Sweet Sixteen, Walz's basketball team reached the final during 1994. Her 121 points during that year's tournament remained as a KHSAA record during 2023. She was also named All-Tournament between 1994 and 1996. During 1996, she played in the WBCA High School All-America Game. That year, she took a break from basketball by skipping the Indiana-Kentucky All-Star tournament.

When "totals in eight high school semesters" were accepted by the National Federation of State High School Associations during December 1995, points made by Walz before ninth grade were made ineligible by the KHSAA. The following month, these 1078 points became eligible by the KHSAA. In 1996, she became first for most girls basketball points in Kentucky. With 4948 points at Highlands, Walz held the KHSAA career record until it was surpassed in 2016.

Walz's KHSAA record of 1004 steals was broken by 2012. Her 539 three-pointers and 1354 assists remained in first during 2023. For her NFHS career statistics, Walz is in the top ten with 996 assists and 453 three-pointers. Her 3872 points is in the top twenty. Outside of basketball, Walz was on the volleyball and softball teams while attending Highlands.

=== College ===
In 1996, Walz joined the basketball team at Western Kentucky University. At the 1998 NCAA Division I women's basketball tournament, she played in the second round. She injured her anterior cruciate ligament in January 1999 and stopped playing the following month. Following surgery and therapy, Walz went back on the team in October 1999. They competed in the second round of the 2000 NCAA Division I tournament.

While at Western Kentucky, Walz held the season record for assists twice and steals once. After leaving the school in 2000, Walz had 182 three pointers and 1044 points. During 2023, she was seventh for most three pointers at Western Kentucky.

== Career ==
At Highlands, Walz was an assistant coach between 2001 and 2002. While at the school, she started coaching the girls basketball team during 2002. During 2013, Highlands reached the championship game during the Ninth Region Tournament. For her victories, Jamie Walz Richey reached 300 in 2017 and 400 in 2022. She remained as coach leading up to the mid-2020s.

Outside of coaching, Walz was at Scottsville, Kentucky in 2001 and worked as a student teacher. With Highlands, she was a business teacher during 2002. Between the late 2010s to early 2020s, Walz Richey continued to work in business as their chair.

== Honors and personal life ==
Walz was named All-State by the Kentucky Associated Press between 1993 and 1996. During this time period, she was a Prep Athlete of the Year for them in 1995 and 1996. Walz was an All-American for Parade during 1995 and the Women's Basketball Coaches Association in 1996. She also was All-USA for USA Today in 1996. That year, she was the Kentucky Miss Basketball. She also won Player of the Year awards from Gatorade and Parade.

From the Sun Belt Conference, Walz was All-Tournament and All-Conference during 2000. During 2013, she joined the KHSAA Hall of Fame and the Kentucky High School Basketball Hall of Fame. The following year, Walz Richey entered the Kentucky All-Star Hall of Fame. As a regional inductee, she became part of the Greater Cincinnati Basketball Hall of Fame during 2005 and the Northern Kentucky Sports Hall of Fame during 2016. For Kentucky, Walz Richey was selected for the Kentucky Athletic Hall of Fame in 2008. She has two children during her marriage. Richey is related to coach Jeff Walz.
