= 2010 San Antonio Silver Stars season =

- Head coach: Sandy Brondello
- Arena: AT&T Center

Results
- Record: 14–20 (.412)
- Place: 3rd (Western)
- Playoff finish: Lost Conference Semifinals

Media
- Television: FS-SW; NBATV, ESPN2
- Radio: KTKR

The 2010 San Antonio Silver Stars season was the 14th season overall for the franchise in the Women's National Basketball Association, and their 8th in San Antonio.

== Transactions ==
=== Dispersal draft ===
Based on the Silver Stars' 2009 record, they would pick 5th in the Sacramento Monarchs dispersal draft. The Silver Stars picked Laura Harper.

=== WNBA draft ===
The following are the Silver Stars' selections in the 2010 WNBA draft.

Round	Pick	Player	Nationality	School/team/country
1	5	Jayne Appel	United States	Stanford
2	17	Alysha Clark	United States	Middle Tennessee State
3	29	Alexis Rack	United States	Mississippi State

=== Transaction log ===
- February 2: The Silver Stars re-signed free agent Ruth Riley.
- February 19: The Silver Stars acquired Roneeka Hodges from the Minnesota Lynx in exchange for the right to swap second round picks in the 2011 WNBA Draft.
- February 24: The Silver Stars signed Quianna Chaney to a training camp contract.
- February 25: Dan Hughes announced that he would step aside from the head coaching position and promoted Sandy Brondello to head coach.
- March 9: The Silver Stars signed Tasha Humphrey to a training camp contract.
- March 10: The Silver Stars re-signed Shanna Crossley.
- March 11: The Silver Stars traded Dalma Ivanyi and the right to swap second round picks in the 2011 WNBA Draft to the Atlanta Dream in exchange for Michelle Snow.
- April 6: The Silver Stars signed Deonna Davis to a training camp contract.
- April 14: The Silver Stars traded Shanna Crossley to the Tulsa Shock in exchange for Crystal Kelly.
- April 22: The Silver Stars re-signed Edwige Lawson-Wade.
- April 28: The Silver Stars re-signed Belinda Snell.
- April 29: The Silver Stars waived Brittany Jackson.
- May 5: The Silver Stars waived Dee Davis and Diana Delva.
- May 9: The Silver Stars waived Krystal Vaughn and Alexis Rack.
- May 13: The Silver Stars waived Quianna Chaney, Lacey Simpson and Charel Allen.
- May 14: The Silver Stars waived Alysha Clark and Tasha Humphrey.
- May 21: The Silver Stars signed Chamique Holdsclaw and waived Belinda Snell.
- June 9: The Silver Stars signed Allie Quigley and waived Crystal Kelly.
- June 29: The Silver Stars waived Megan Frazee and signed Crystal Kelly.
- July 15: The Silver Stars waived Allie Quigley.
- August 11: The Silver Stars signed Ashley Battle.

=== Trades ===
Date	Trade	
February 19, 2010	To San Antonio Silver Stars	To Minnesota Lynx
February 19, 2010	Roneeka Hodges and right to swap second round picks in the 2011 Draft	the right to swap second round picks in the 2011 Draft
March 11, 2010	To San Antonio Silver Stars	To Atlanta Dream
March 11, 2010	Dalma Ivanyi and right to swap second round picks in the 2011 Draft	Michelle Snow and the right to swap second round picks in the 2011 Draft
April 14, 2010	To San Antonio Silver Stars	To Tulsa Shock
April 14, 2010	Crystal Kelly	Shanna Crossley

=== Free agents ===
==== Additions ====
Player	Signed	Former team
Laura Harper	December 14, 2009	Sacramento Monarchs
Ruth Riley	February 2, 2010	re-signed
Roneeka Hodges	February 19, 2010	Minnesota Lynx
Michelle Snow	March 10, 2010	Atlanta Dream
Crystal Kelly	April 14, 2010	Tulsa Shock
Edwige Lawson-Wade	April 22, 2010	re-signed
Belinda Snell	April 28, 2010	re-signed
Chamique Holdsclaw	May 21, 2010	Atlanta Dream
Allie Quigley	June 9, 2010	free agent
Ashley Battle	August 11, 2010	free agent

==== Subtractions ====
Player	Left	New team
Vickie Johnson	2009	retired
Erin Perperoglou	2009	retired
Shanna Crossley	April 14, 2010	Tulsa Shock
Belinda Snell	May 21, 2010	free agent
Megan Frazee	June 27, 2010	free agent
Allie Quigley	July 15, 2010	free agent

== Roster ==
2010 San Antonio Silver Stars roster
Players
Coaches

Pos.	No.	Nat.	Name	Height	Weight	From
C	32	(United States)	Appel, Jayne	6' 4" (1.93m)	210 lb (95kg)	Stanford
F	22	(United States)	Battle, Ashley	6' 0" (1.83m)	170 lb (77kg)	Connecticut
PG	30	(United States)	Darling, Helen	5' 6" (1.68m)	164 lb (74kg)	Penn State
PG	25	(Russia)	Hammon, Becky	5' 6" (1.68m)	136 lb (62kg)	Colorado State
G	5	(United States)	Hodges, Roneeka	5' 11" (1.8m)	165 lb (75kg)	Florida State
F	1	(United States)	Holdsclaw, Chamique	6' 2" (1.88m)	172 lb (78kg)	Tennessee
F	42	(United States)	Kelly, Crystal	6' 2" (1.88m)	200 lb (91kg)	Western Kentucky
SG	9	(France)	Lawson-Wade, Edwige	5' 6" (1.68m)	130 lb (59kg)	France
C	00	(United States)	Riley, Ruth	6' 5" (1.96m)	198 lb (90kg)	Notre Dame
C	2	(United States)	Snow, Michelle	6' 5" (1.96m)	158 lb (72kg)	Tennessee
PF	33	(Saint Vincent and the Grenadines)	Young, Sophia	6' 1" (1.85m)	165 lb (75kg)	Baylor

Head coach
(Australia) Sandy Brondello (Australia)
Assistant coaches
(United States) Olaf Lange (Germany)
Athletic trainer
(United States) Tonya Holley (St. Andrews Presbyterian)
Strength and conditioning coach
(United States) Mike Ekanem (Texas Lutheran)

Legend

- (C) Team captain
- (DP) Unsigned draft pick
- (FA) Free agent
- (S) Suspended
- Injured

WNBA roster page

=== Depth ===
Pos.	Starter	Bench
C	Michelle Snow	Ruth Riley
PF	Sophia Young	Jayne Appel / Crystal Kelly
SF	Chamique Holdsclaw	Ashley Battle
SG	Roneeka Hodges	Edwige Lawson-Wade
PG	Becky Hammon	Helen Darling

== Season standings ==
Western Conference	W	L	PCT	GB	Home	Road	Conf.
Seattle Storm ^{x}	28	6	.824	–	17–0	11–6	20–2
Phoenix Mercury ^{x}	15	19	.441	13.0	9–8	6–11	13–9
San Antonio Silver Stars ^{x}	14	20	.412	14.0	8–9	6–11	11–11
Los Angeles Sparks ^{x}	13	21	.382	15.0	8–9	5–12	10–12
Minnesota Lynx ^{o}	13	21	.382	15.0	7–10	6–11	8–14
Tulsa Shock ^{o}	6	28	.176	22.0	4–13	2–15	4–18

== Schedule ==
=== Preseason ===
2010 Game Log: Preseason

Game	Date	Time (ET)	Opponent	Score	High points	High rebounds	High assists	Location/Attendance	Record
1	May 4	8:00pm	China National Team	91-57	N/A	N/A	N/A	Incarnate Word; N/A	1-0
2	May 8	3:30pm	@ Los Angeles	86-77	Belinda Snell (17)	Alysha Clark (7)	Helen Darling (4)	Walter Pyramid; 1,521	2-0

=== Regular season ===
2010 Game Log: Regular Season
May

Game	Date	Time (ET)	Opponent	TV	Score	High points	High rebounds	High assists	Location/Attendance	Record
1	May 15	8:00pm	Atlanta	FS-SW	70-75	Hammon (20)	Riley (6)	Hammon (5)	AT&T Center; 9,409	0-1
2	May 20	12:30pm	@ Tulsa	NBATV; FS-SW; FS-OK	83-74	Young (23)	Snow (15)	Hammon (7)	BOK Center; 4,636	1-1
3	May 22	8:00pm	Los Angeles	NBATV; FS-SW	88-81	Holdsclaw (19)	Snow (10)	Hammon, Holdsclaw (5)	AT&T Center; 7,862	2-1
4	May 28	8:00pm	New York		71-77	Young (17)	Riley (6)	Hammon (8)	AT&T Center; 5,293	2-2
5	May 30	3:00pm	Seattle		56-84	Hodges (12)	Snow (6)	Snow (3)	AT&T Center; 4,924	2-3

June

Game	Date	Time (ET)	Opponent	TV	Score	High points	High rebounds	High assists	Location/Attendance	Record
6	June 3	7:00pm	@ Indiana	FS-SW; FS-I	57-79	Holdsclaw (12)	Holdsclaw (5)	Lawson-Wade (4)	Conseco Fieldhouse; 7,574	2-4
7	June 6	1:00pm	@ Connecticut		68-81	Young (21)	Snow (10)	Lawson-Wade (9)	Mohegan Sun Arena; 6,292	2-5
8	June 11	8:00pm	Tulsa		87-75	Holdsclaw (19)	Holdsclaw (11)	Lawson-Wade (9)	AT&T Center; 7,076	3-5
6	June 13	3:00pm	@ Atlanta	NBATV; SSO	83-90	Young (24)	Holdsclaw (9)	Lawson-Wade (7)	Philips Arena; 6,050	3-6
7	June 18	10:00pm	@ Phoenix		108-105	Young (25)	Young (10)	Hammon (10)	US Airways Center; 6,147	4-6
8	June 20	9:00pm	@ Seattle	NBATV; FS-SW	61-82	Hammon, Holdsclaw (12)	Holdsclaw (9)	Hammon (5)	KeyArena; 8,086	4-7
7	June 26	8:00pm	Minnesota	NBATV; FS-SW	80-66	Snow (23)	Snow (9)	Hammon (10)	AT&T Center; 10,184	5-7
8	June 29	10:00pm	@ Seattle		72-86	Hammon (24)	Appel, Holdsclaw (6)	5 players (1)	KeyArena; 7,823	5-8

July

Game	Date	Time (ET)	Opponent	TV	Score	High points	High rebounds	High assists	Location/Attendance	Record
8	July 1	10:30pm	@ Los Angeles		63-73	Snow (16)	Snow (8)	Lawson-Wade (5)	STAPLES Center; 7,803	5-9
7	July 6	8:00pm	Connecticut	ESPN2	79-66	Young (19)	Snow, Young (8)	Hammon (8)	AT&T Center; 7,264	6-9
8	July 8	8:00pm	@ Minnesota		66-89	Hodges (15)	Young (5)	Darling (5)	Target Center; 7,182	6-10
8	July 14	12:30pm	@ Chicago	CN100	61-88	Young (14)	Snow (8)	Darling, Hammon, Young (4)	Allstate Arena; 6,950	6-11
7	July 16	8:00pm	Tulsa		70-75	Holdsclaw (20)	Young (11)	Snow (4)	AT&T Center; 9,298	6-12
8	July 18	3:00pm	Los Angeles		83-73	Hodges (24)	Appel, Hodges (5)	Hammon (7)	AT&T Center; 6,542	7-12
8	July 20	12:30pm	Seattle	NBATV; FS-SW	74-80	Young (18)	Young (7)	Hammon (10)	AT&T Center; 12,414	7-13
7	July 22	8:00pm	@ Minnesota		74-72	Holdsclaw (17)	Holdsclaw (8)	Darling (4)	Target Center; 6,126	8-13
8	July 24	8:00pm	Chicago	CN100	72-75	Hodges, Snow (13)	Snow (11)	Young (5)	AT&T Center; 8,999	8-14
8	July 27	7:30pm	@ New York	ESPN2	72-77	Holdsclaw (18)	Holdsclaw (9)	Hammon, Snow (4)	Madison Square Garden; 10,712	8-15
7	July 29	7:00pm	@ Washington	NBATV; CSN-MA	79-75	Holdsclaw (17)	Holdsclaw (11)	Hammon (6)	Verizon Center; 9,212	9-15
8	July 30	8:00pm	@ Tulsa	NBATV; FS-OK	101-85	Hammon (22)	Snow (7)	Hammon, Holdsclaw, Lawson-Wade (3)	BOK Center; 5,203	10-15

August

Game	Date	Time (ET)	Opponent	TV	Score	High points	High rebounds	High assists	Location/Attendance	Record
8	August 3	8:00pm	Phoenix		92-103	Young (24)	Holdsclaw, Snow (7)	Hammon (11)	AT&T Center; 6,116	10-16
7	August 6	10:00pm	@ Phoenix		87-103	Hammon, Holdsclaw (21)	Holdsclaw (9)	Snow (4)	US Airways Center; 12,909	10-17
8	August 8	8:00pm	@ Los Angeles	NBATV; FS-SW; FS-W	92-83	Hodges (19)	Young (10)	Hammon (7)	STAPLES Center; 9,793	11-17
8	August 10	8:00pm	Minnesota		66-73	Young (19)	Snow (10)	Hammon (8)	AT&T Center; 5,142	11-18
7	August 13	8:00pm	Tulsa		94-74	Holdslcaw (18)	Kelly (9)	Hammon (8)	AT&T Center; 10,244	12-18
8	August 15	7:00pm	@ Minnesota	NBATV; FS-SW; FS-N	78-84	Hammon (30)	Hammon, Hodges (6)	Hammon, Hodges, Young (3)	Target Center; 8,678	12-19
8	August 17	8:00pm	Washington		76-66	Young (19)	Hodges, Snow (5)	Hammon (5)	AT&T Center; 6,801	12-20
7	August 20	8:00pm	Indiana		75-61	Young (22)	Snow (8)	Hammon, Snow (6)	AT&T Center; 10,807	13-20
8	August 22	3:00pm	Phoenix		83-82	Hammon (30)	Young (10)	Hodges (6)	AT&T Center; 8,331	14-20

All games are viewable on WNBA LiveAccess

=== Postseason ===
2010 Game Log: Postseason
Western Conference Semifinals

Game	Date	Time (ET)	Opponent	TV	Score	High points	High rebounds	High assists	Location/Attendance	Series
1	August 26	9:00pm	@ Phoenix	ESPN2	93-106	Hammon (19)	Young (9)	Hammon, Snow (4)	US Airways Center; 8,927	0-1
2	August 28	1:00pm	Phoenix	ESPN2	73-92	Hammon (21)	Young (9)	Hammon (7)	AT&T Center; 6,763	0-2

== Statistics ==
Legend
GP	Games played	GS	Games started	MPG	Minutes per game	RPG	Rebounds per game
APG	Assists per game	SPG	Steals per game	BPG	Blocks per game	PPG	Points per game
FG%	Field-goal percentage	3P%	3-point field-goal percentage	FT%	Free-throw percentage	TO	Turnovers per game
PF	Fouls per game		Team leader		League leader

=== Regular season ===
Player	GP	GS	MPG	FG%	3P%	FT%	RPG	APG	SPG	BPG	PPG
Jayne Appel	28	0	10.9	.535	.333	.559	2.5	0.5	0.25	0.18	3.4
Ashley Battle	5	0	7.0	.333	.000	.000	1.8	0.2	0.00	0.00	1.6
Helen Darling	33	1	11.8	.300	.273	.647	1.0	1.4	0.61	0.03	1.9
Megan Frazee	10	0	10.1	.375	.111	.684	2.1	0.1	0.00	0.00	3.8
Becky Hammon	32	32	33.6	.442	.390	.960	2.9	5.4	1.13	0.25	15.1
Roneeka Hodges	34	19	25.3	.357	.308	.758	3.2	1.4	0.44	0.29	7.7
Chamique Holdsclaw	29	29	29.0	.494	.355	.806	5.3	2.0	1.48	0.34	13.6
Crystal Kelly	26	0	9.3	.440	1.000	.739	1.2	0.3	0.27	0.04	3.0
Edwige Lawson-Wade	33	19	21.9	.370	.339	.907	1.9	2.8	1.06	0.06	6.5
Allie Quigley	4	0	6.3	.500	.500	.667	0.3	0.0	0.00	0.00	3.5
Ruth Riley	20	2	13.1	.537	.200	.800	2.3	1.0	0.25	0.65	3.8
Belinda Snell	2	1	19.0	.333	.200	1.000	2.0	2.5	0.00	0.00	4.5
Michelle Snow	34	33	24.1	.574	.000	.719	6.2	1.6	0.97	0.74	10.4
Sophia Young	34	34	31.8	.501	.263	.658	5.2	2.4	1.59	0.26	15.3

=== Postseason ===
Player	GP	GS	MPG	FG%	3P%	FT%	RPG	APG	SPG	BPG	PPG
Jayne Appel	2	0	12.0	.500	.000	.750	3.5	1.0	0.00	0.00	5.5
Ashley Battle	2	0	17.0	.200	.500	.750	3.0	2.0	0.50	0.00	3.0
Helen Darling	2	0	7.0	.500	.000	.000	0.5	0.0	0.00	0.00	1.0
Becky Hammon	2	2	37.0	.393	.389	1.000	3.5	5.5	0.50	0.00	20.0
Roneeka Hodges	2	2	28.5	.529	.429	.000	1.5	1.5	0.00	0.00	10.5
Crystal Kelly	1	0	6.0	.000	.000	.500	2.0	0.0	0.00	0.00	1.0
Edwige Lawson-Wade	2	2	28.5	.538	.625	1.000	1.5	4.0	2.00	0.50	12.5
Ruth Riley	2	0	15.5	.455	.000	1.000	2.0	0.0	1.50	1.50	7.5
Michelle Snow	2	2	19.0	.333	.000	.667	4.0	2.0	0.50	0.00	7.0
Sophia Young	2	2	33.0	.406	.000	.556	9.0	2.5	1.00	0.50	15.5

== Awards and honors ==
- Jayne Appel was named to the 2010 WNBA All-Star Team as a WNBA reserve.
- Becky Hammon was named to the 2010 WNBA All-Star Team as a WNBA reserve.
- Michelle Snow was named to the 2010 WNBA All-Star Team as a WNBA starter.
- Sophia Young was named to the 2010 WNBA All-Star Team as a WNBA reserve.
