= Kentucky Miss Basketball =

Award

The Kentucky Miss Basketball honor recognizes the top female high school basketball player in the state of Kentucky. The corresponding male honor, Kentucky Mr. Basketball, was first awarded in 1954, with Kentucky Miss Basketball being created in 1976. The award is presented annually by the Kentucky Lions Eye Foundation.

Over the history of the award, all but one of the honorees has gone on to play basketball in college. Six were also drafted into the WNBA.

== Award winners ==
Year	Player	High School	College	WNBA Draft
1976	Donna Murphy	Newport	Morehead State	
1977	Geri Grigsby	McDowell	Kentucky	
1978	Irene Moore	Breathitt County		
1979	Beth Wilkerson	Paris	Old Dominion	
1980	Lisa Collins	Laurel County	Kentucky	
1981	Lillie Mason	Olmstead High	Western Kentucky	
1982	Connie Goins	Franklin Co./Western Hills	Duke	
1983	Clemette Haskins	Warren Central	Western Kentucky	
1984	Carol Parker	Marshall County	Paducah Community College	
1985	Bridgette Combs	Whitesburg	Western Kentucky	
1986	Kris Miller	Owensboro Catholic	Kentucky	
1987	Mary Taylor	Marshall County	Western Kentucky	
1988	Kim Pehlke	Louisville Doss	Western Kentucky	
1989	Lisa Harrison	Louisville Southern	Tennessee	1999 WNBA draft: 3rd round, 34th overall by the Phoenix Mercury
1990	Kim Mays	Knox Central	Eastern Kentucky	
1991	Ida Bowen	Sheldon Clark	Western Kentucky	
1992	Becky McKinley	Bullitt East	Kentucky	
1993	Brandi Ashby	Webster County	Hawaiʻi; Western Kentucky	
1994	Laurie Townsend	Apollo	Western Kentucky	
1995	Ukari Figgs	Scott County	Purdue	1999 WNBA draft: 3rd round, 28th overall by the Los Angeles Sparks
1996	Jaime Walz	Ft. Thomas Highlands	Western Kentucky	
1997	Rachel Byars	Union County	Western Kentucky; Boston College	
1998	Beth Vice	Montgomery County	Alabama	
1999	Jody Sizemore	Leslie County	Morehead State	
2000	Jenni Benningfield	Assumption	Vanderbilt	2004 WNBA draft: 2nd round, 22nd overall by the Charlotte Sting
2001	Katie Schweggman	Bishop Brossart	Miami (OH)	
2002	Erica Hallman	Holmes	Kansas	
2003	Megen Gearhart	West Carter	Morehead State	
2004	Crystal Kelly	Sacred Heart	Western Kentucky	2008 WNBA draft: 3rd round, 31st overall by the Houston Comets
2005	Carly Ormerod	Sacred Heart	Kentucky	
2006	Arnika Brown	Christian County	Kentucky; St. Catharine; Western Kentucky	
2007	Rebecca Gray	Scott County	North Carolina; Kentucky; Union College	
2008	Tia Gibbs	Butler Traditional	Vanderbilt; Louisville	
2009	A'dia Mathies	Louisville Iroquois	Kentucky	2013 WNBA draft: 1st round, 10th overall by the Los Angeles Sparks
2010	Sarah Beth Barnette	Lexington Christian Academy	Kentucky; Virginia	
2011	Sara Hammond	Rockcastle County	Louisville	
2012	Sydney Moss	Boone County	Florida; Thomas More College	
2013	Makayla Epps	Marion County	Kentucky	2017 WNBA draft: 3rd round, 33rd overall by the Chicago Sky
2014	Ivy Brown	LaRue County	Western Kentucky	
2015	Maci Morris	Bell County	Kentucky	
2016	Erin Boley	Elizabethtown	Notre Dame; Oregon	
2017	Lindsey Duvall	Bullitt East	Louisville; Northern Kentucky	
2018	Seygan Robins	Mercer County	Louisville; UT Martin	
2019	Savannah Wheeler	Boyd County	Marshall	
2020	Maddie Scherr	Ryle	Oregon; Kentucky	
2021	Brooklyn Miles	Franklin County	Tennessee	
2022	Amiya Jenkins	Anderson County	Kentucky	
2023	Haven Ford	Rowan County	Murray State	
2024	Trinity Rowe	Pikeville	Southern Mississippi	
2025	ZaKiyah Johnson	Sacred Heart	Louisiana State	
2026	Ashlynn James	Assumption	Indiana	

== See also ==
- Kentucky Mr. Basketball
