= 2005 Houston Comets season =

- Head coach: Van Chancellor
- Arena: Toyota Center

Results
- Record: 19–15 (.559)
- Place: 3rd (Western)
- Playoff finish: Lost Conference Finals (2-0) to Sacramento Monarchs

The 2005 WNBA season was the ninth season for the Houston Comets. The Comets knocked off defending champion Seattle Storm in the first round, but they were unable to get past the eventual champion Sacramento Monarchs in the conference finals.

== Offseason ==
=== WNBA draft ===
Round	Pick	Player	Nationality	College/School/Team
1	5	Sancho Lyttle (C)	Saint Vincent and the Grenadines	Houston
2	15	Roneeka Hodges (G)	United States	Florida State
3	28	Jenni Dant (G)	United States	DePaul

== Regular season ==
=== Season standings ===
Western Conference	W	L	PCT	GB	Home	Road	Conf.
Sacramento Monarchs ^{x}	25	9	.735	–	15–2	10–7	17–5
Seattle Storm ^{x}	20	14	.588	5.0	14–3	6–11	13–9
Houston Comets ^{x}	19	15	.559	6.0	11–6	8–9	11–11
Los Angeles Sparks ^{x}	17	17	.500	8.0	11–6	6–11	12–10
Phoenix Mercury ^{o}	16	18	.471	9.0	11–6	5–12	12–10
Minnesota Lynx ^{o}	14	20	.412	11.0	11–6	3–14	9–13
San Antonio Silver Stars ^{o}	7	27	.206	18.0	5–12	2–15	3–19

=== Season schedule ===
Date	Opponent	Score	Result	Record
May 21	@ San Antonio	78-70	Win	1-0
May 22	Minnesota	79-65	Win	2-0
May 27	@ Seattle	69-79	Loss	2-1
May 29	Indiana	86-78 (2OT)	Win	3-1
June 4	Phoenix	59-57	Win	4-1
June 7	Minnesota	58-62	Loss	4-2
June 10	Connecticut	57-77	Loss	4-3
June 13	@ Sacramento	68-74	Loss	4-4
June 15	@ Los Angeles	64-83	Loss	4-5
June 18	@ San Antonio	75-69	Win	5-5
June 25	San Antonio	62-44	Win	6-5
June 28	Seattle	71-67	Win	7-5
July 2	Charlotte	75-65	Win	8-5
July 5	@ Detroit	75-66	Win	9-5
July 7	@ Indiana	65-63	Win	10-5
July 12	New York	65-68 (OT)	Loss	10-6
July 15	@ Connecticut	66-70	Loss	10-7
July 17	@ Charlotte	67-55	Win	11-7
July 19	Sacramento	58-54	Win	12-7
July 21	Washington	65-70	Loss	12-8
July 23	Los Angeles	59-69	Loss	12-9
July 26	@ Washington	83-65	Win	13-9
July 27	@ New York	71-69	Win	14-9
July 30	San Antonio	63-68	Loss	14-10
August 2	Detroit	62-61	Win	15-10
August 5	@ Phoenix	75-80	Loss	15-11
August 7	@ Sacramento	45-55	Loss	15-12
August 9	@ Seattle	68-71	Loss	15-13
August 14	Seattle	75-72	Win	16-13
August 16	@ Minnesota	62-73	Loss	16-14
August 18	Phoenix	77-66	Win	17-14
August 21	@ Los Angeles	50-55	Loss	17-15
August 25	@ Phoenix	80-72	Win	18-15
August 27	Los Angeles	77-51	Win	19-15
August 30; 1st Round, G1	Seattle	67-75	Loss	0-1
September 1; 1st Round, G2	@ Seattle	67-64	Win	1-1
September 3; 1st Round, G3	@ Seattle	75-58	Win	2-1
September 8 West Finals, G1	Sacramento	69-73 (OT)	Loss	2-2
September 10; West Finals, G2	@ Sacramento	65-74	Loss	2-3

== Player stats ==
Player	GP	REB	AST	STL	BLK	PTS
Sheryl Swoopes	33	119	141	66	26	614
Michelle Snow	33	225	40	20	38	396
Janeth Arcain	34	93	53	55	6	342
Dominique Canty	33	108	101	29	2	270
Tina Thompson	15	57	22	12	4	152
Sancho Lyttle	33	125	17	20	3	140
Kristen Rasmussen	24	76	22	13	16	121
Tari Phillips	32	79	14	11	8	111
Adrienne Goodson	23	36	15	8	0	72
Roneeka Hodges	26	17	7	3	0	33
Dawn Staley	10	17	28	6	1	33
Edwige Lawson-Wade	17	7	4	2	1	25
Felicia Ragland	4	0	1	0	0	0
Kiesha Brown	4	1	2	1	0	0
