= Jessica Moore (basketball) =

American basketball player (born 1982)

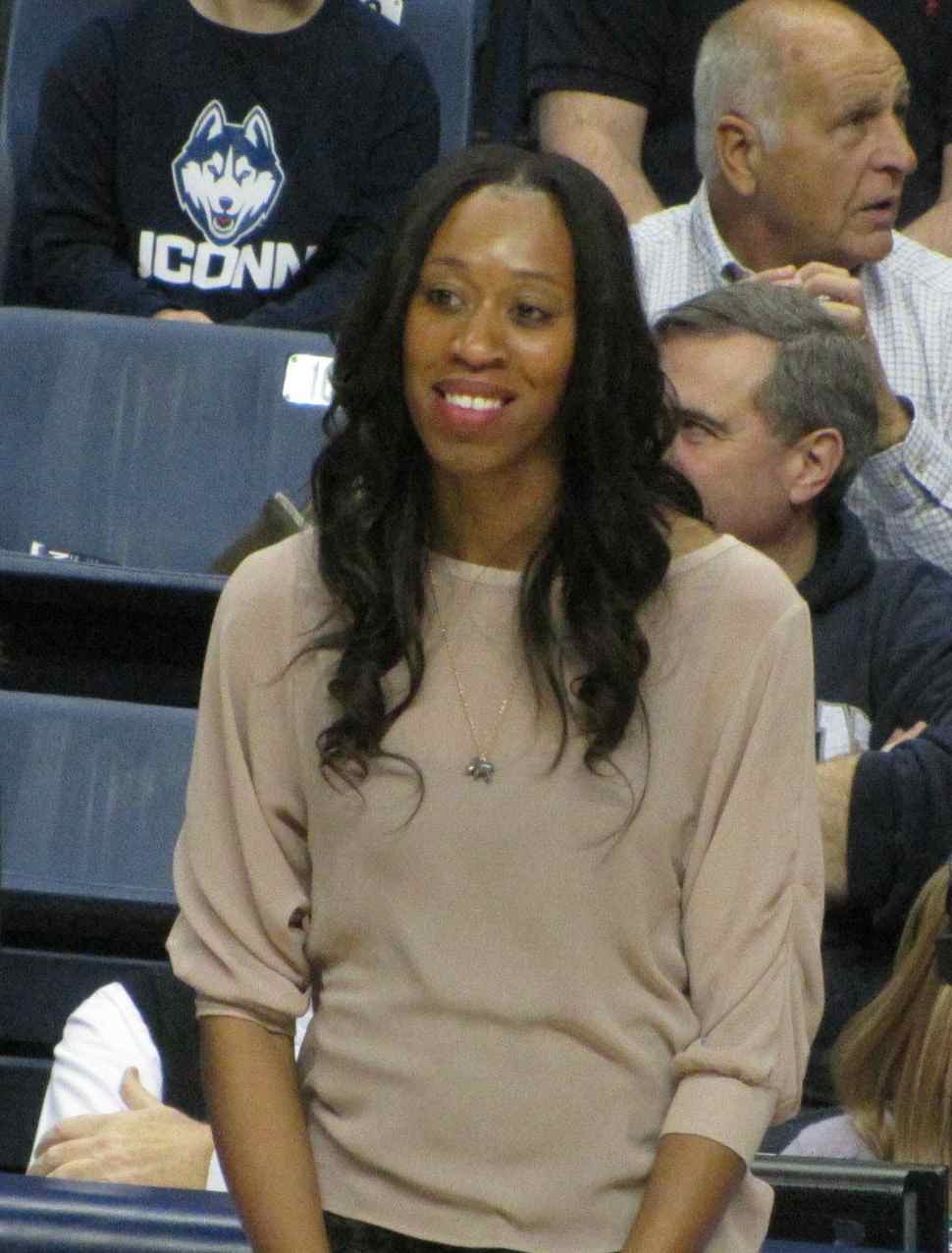

Personal information
- Born: July 9, 1982 (age 44) Fairbanks, Alaska, U.S.
- Listed height: 6 ft 3 in (1.91 m)
- Listed weight: 175 lb (79 kg)

Career information
- High school: Colony (Palmer, Alaska)
- College: UConn (2001–2005)
- WNBA draft: 2005: 2nd round, 24th overall pick
- Drafted by: Charlotte Sting
- Playing career: 2005–2013
- Position: Power forward / center

Career history
- 2005: Charlotte Sting
- 2005–2008: Los Angeles Sparks
- 2009–2010: Indiana Fever
- 2011: Connecticut Sun
- 2012: Atlanta Dream
- 2012: Connecticut Sun
- 2013: Washington Mystics

Career highlights
- 3× NCAA champion (2002–2004)
- Stats at WNBA.com
- Stats at Basketball Reference
Medals
Women's basketball
Representing the United States
FIBA Under-19 World Cup
Bronze medal – third place	2001 Czech Republic	Team

Jessica Alicia Moore (born July 9, 1982) is an American professional basketball player. Moore was a Center for the UConn Huskies from 2000 to 2005.

== High school ==
Moore was introduced to basketball at the age of 10 by her older brother. By the time Moore reached Colony High School in Palmer, Alaska, she was a good all-around athlete. She was on the basketball, track and volleyball teams. The basketball team reached the state finals four times winning the State Championship twice, and the volleyball team also won two State Championships. Jessica was voted Alaska's Athlete Of The Year her junior and senior high school years. Her most memorable experience from high school was winning her first of two State Championships in 1998.

=== AAU ===
Moore got recognition from an Athletic Amateur Union (AAU) in Oregon. The coach spoke to Jessica's high school coach, inviting her to play for his team during the second half of the summer. This team traveled all around the country, offering her great exposure. During her sophomore, junior and senior summers, she spent half of it with her Alaska team, and half playing, and living in Oregon.

== College ==
Moore narrowed her college choices down to four—University of California, Los Angeles (UCLA), University of Oregon, University of Connecticut and Ohio State University. She chose the University of Connecticut because of the family atmosphere and the high possibility of winning a National Championship. Once she'd picked a school, she had to decide if she would play both volleyball and basketball or just pick one; she picked basketball.

The basketball team was already stacked with post players so Jessica wasn't going to get much playing time as a freshman. She was a medical red shirted player her first year gaining an extra year of eligibility. It all paid off; the Huskies won three National Championships in Jessica's years at Connecticut. However, it would not come without some hardship. During her third national championship game, Moore suffered a torn anterior cruciate ligament (ACL) injury in the second half of the game. Nonetheless, she remained in the game, finishing with 14 points and nine rebounds, despite the injury that would require surgery. In May 2005, Moore earned her bachelor's degree in political science.

== USA Basketball ==
Moore was named to the USA Women's U19 team which represented the US in the 2001 U19 World's Championship, held in Brno, Czech Republic in July 2001. Moore scored 6.4 points per game, and helped the USA team to a 6–1 record and the bronze medal. She was the third leading rebounder on the team averaging 5.3 per game.

== WNBA ==
Moore was selected number 24 by the Charlotte Sting in the 2005 WNBA draft. The team struggled and then made some roster changes. She was cut but not without being noticed by other league teams, and two days later, she was picked up by the Los Angeles Sparks where she enjoyed playing on a winning team and making it to the WNBA playoffs. In the WNBA off-season she went to Europe and played in Spain for Universitario de Ferrol. The next year she played in France for Challes Les Eux.

In 2011, Moore was waived by the Indiana Fever, but picked up by the Connecticut Sun. She played in the WNBA for a total of 8 seasons.

== Career statistics ==
Legend
GP	Games played	GS	Games started	MPG	Minutes per game	RPG	Rebounds per game
APG	Assists per game	SPG	Steals per game	BPG	Blocks per game	PPG	Points per game
TO	Turnovers per game	FG%	Field-goal percentage	3P%	3-point field-goal percentage	FT%	Free-throw percentage
**Bold**	Career best	°	League leader

=== WNBA ===
==== Regular season ====
WNBA regular season statistics
Year	Team	GP	GS	MPG	FG%	3P%	FT%	RPG	APG	SPG	BPG	TO	PPG
2005	Charlotte	6	0	8.2	33.3	—	50.0	0.8	0.3	0.0	0.0	0.7	0.5
2005	Los Angeles	15	0	7.3	50.0	—	—	0.5	0.1	0.3	0.0	**0.3**	0.5
2006	Los Angeles	**34**	**33**	19.3	43.4	0.0	76.3	2.9	**0.7**	**0.6**	**0.3**	0.8	4.3
2007	Los Angeles	28	17	15.7	40.0	—	64.3	**3.1**	0.6	0.2	0.2	1.2	4.4
2008	Los Angeles	28	2	11.0	32.6	—	68.8	1.6	0.6	0.1	0.2	0.6	1.4
2009	Indiana	31	9	**19.8**	47.1	0.0	73.9	**3.1**	0.5	**0.6**	0.2	1.0	**4.8**
2010	Indiana	33	0	13.1	42.7	0.0	**83.3**	2.1	0.4	0.2	0.1	0.9	3.1
2011	Connecticut	29	0	6.9	42.5	—	77.8	0.8	0.2	0.2	0.1	0.5	1.7
2012	Atlanta	8	0	5.4	**66.7**	—	75.0	1.3	0.0	0.0	0.0	0.8	1.9
2012	Connecticut	8	0	8.1	27.3	—	75.0	0.9	0.3	0.0	0.0	0.4	1.5
2013	Washington	2	0	4.0	0.0	—	—	1.0	0.0	0.0	0.0	0.5	0.0
**Career**	9 years, 6 teams	222	61	13.2	42.5	0.0	73.5	2.0	0.4	0.3	0.1	0.8	2.9

==== Playoffs ====
WNBA playoff statistics
Year	Team	GP	GS	MPG	FG%	3P%	FT%	RPG	APG	SPG	BPG	TO	PPG
2006	Los Angeles	5	**5**	**17.8**	50.0	—	**100.0**	**3.2**	**1.0**	0.4	0.0	0.6	**4.8**
2008	Los Angeles	6	0	8.7	33.3	—	**100.0**	0.8	0.5	0.0	0.0	0.5	1.3
2009	Indiana	**10**	0	12.0	33.3	—	75.0	1.7	0.3	**0.5**	0.2	0.3	2.2
2010	Indiana	3	0	5.3	0.0	—	—	0.7	0.3	0.3	**0.3**	**0.0**	0.0
2011	Connecticut	2	0	4.0	**100.0**	—	**100.0**	0.5	0.0	0.0	0.0	0.5	2.0
2012	Connecticut	1	0	2.0	0.0	—	—	0.0	0.0	0.0	0.0	**0.0**	0.0
**Career**	6 years, 4 teams	27	5	10.6	40.4	—	85.7	1.5	0.4	0.3	0.1	0.4	2.1

=== College ===
Jessica Moore Statistics at University of Connecticut
Year	G	FG	FGA	PCT	3FG	3FGA	PCT	FT	FTA	PCT	REB	AVG	A	TO	B	S	MIN	PTS	AVG
2001–02	39	81	139	0.583	0	1	0	50	86	0.58	154	3.9	33	44	37	22	719	212	5.4
2002–03	38	167	275	0.607	–	–	–	69	106	0.651	225	5.9	52	81	38	30	982	403	10.6
2003–04	35	141	228	0.618	1	2	0.5	49	90	0.544	247	7.1	41	57	27	30	882	332	9.5
2004–05	33	110	213	0.516	1	7	0.143	55	79	0.696	208	6.3	41	42	23	22	771	276	8.4
Totals	145	499	855	0.584	2	10	0.2	223	361	0.618	834	5.8	167	224	125	104	3354	1223	8.4

== Huskies of Honor induction ==
On December 29, 2013, the University of Connecticut inducted two women's basketball teams into the Huskies of Honor: the National Championship winning teams of 2002–03 and 2003–04. Moore was a player for each of those two teams.

== See also ==
- Connecticut Huskies women's basketball
- List of Connecticut women's basketball players with 1000 points
- 2003–04 Connecticut Huskies women's basketball team
