= 2005 Indiana Fever season =

6th season in the WNBA

- Head coach: Brian Winters
- Arena: Conseco Fieldhouse

Results
- Record: 21–13 (.618)
- Place: 2nd (Eastern)
- Playoff finish: Lost Conference Finals (2–0) to Connecticut Sun

The 2005 Indiana Fever season was the franchise's 6th season in the WNBA and their 2nd season under head coach, Brian Winters. The Fever achieved their first playoff series victory, but their road to the WNBA Finals ended when the Connecticut Sun swept the Fever in the next round.

This was also the last season the Fever started games at different local times with other teams in the Eastern Time Zone, as the State of Indiana began observing Daylight Saving Time in 2006.

== Offseason ==
=== WNBA draft ===
Round	Pick	Player	Nationality	School/Club team
1	2	Tan White (G)	United States	Mississippi State
2	16	Yolanda Paige (G)	United States	West Virginia
3	29	Ashley Earley (G/F)	United States	Vanderbilt

== Regular season ==
=== Season standings ===
Eastern Conference	W	L	PCT	GB	Home	Road	Conf.
Connecticut Sun ^{x}	26	8	.765	–	14–3	12–5	13–7
Indiana Fever ^{x}	21	13	.618	5.0	14–3	7–10	14–6
New York Liberty ^{x}	18	16	.529	8.0	10–7	8–9	9–11
Detroit Shock ^{x}	16	18	.471	10.0	12–5	4–13	11–9
Washington Mystics ^{o}	16	18	.471	10.0	10–7	6–11	9–11
Charlotte Sting ^{o}	6	28	.176	20.0	5–12	1–16	4–16

=== Season schedule ===
Date	Opponent	Score	Result	Record
May 22	Charlotte	68–58	Win	1–0
May 24	Phoenix	83–76	Win	2–0
May 26	@ New York	67–59	Win	3–0
May 29	@ Houston	78–86 (2OT)	Loss	3–1
June 1	Sacramento	61–60	Win	4–1
June 4	@ Seattle	77–83	Loss	4–2
June 7	@ Sacramento	51–65	Loss	4–3
June 10	New York	62–59	Win	5–3
June 15	Detroit	84–79 (OT)	Win	6–3
June 16	@ Charlotte	60–57	Win	7–3
June 18	@ Washington	78–88 (2OT)	Loss	7–4
June 24	Minnesota	57–55	Win	8–4
June 28	Los Angeles	58–61	Loss	8–5
July 7	Houston	63–65	Loss	8–6
July 13	Connecticut	64–53	Win	9–6
July 15	Detroit	62–57	Win	10–6
July 17	@ Detroit	59–58	Win	11–6
July 19	@ Minnesota	45–66	Loss	11–7
July 21	San Antonio	66–53	Win	12–7
July 23	@ Charlotte	63–46	Win	13–7
July 26	@ Connecticut	55–68	Loss	13–8
July 29	Washington	62–58	Win	14–8
July 31	@ New York	53–67	Loss	14–9
August 4	Seattle	78–68	Win	15–9
August 6	Connecticut	65–74	Loss	15–10
August 7	@ Washington	60–61	Loss	15–11
August 11	@ San Antonio	57–50	Win	16–11
August 13	@ Los Angeles	59–69	Loss	16–12
August 14	@ Phoenix	62–56	Win	17–12
August 18	Washington	67–57	Win	18–12
August 20	Charlotte	62–53	Win	19–12
August 23	@ Connecticut	69–63	Win	20–12
August 25	@ Detroit	40–55	Loss	20–13
August 27	New York	75–50	Win	21–13

== Playoffs ==
Game	Date	Opponent	Score	Result	Record
Eastern Conference Semifinals
1	August 30	@ New York	63–51	Win	1–0
2	September 1	New York	58–50	Win	2–0
Eastern Conference Finals
1	September 8	Connecticut	68–73	Loss	2–1
2	September 10	@ Connecticut	67–77 (OT)	Loss	2–2

== Player stats ==
Player	GP	REB	AST	STL	BLK	PTS
Tamika Catchings	34	264	143	90	16	501
Kelly Miller	34	86	81	40	2	348
Natalie Williams	34	186	31	35	12	251
Tan White	34	53	53	30	7	242
Tully Bevilaqua	31	63	80	60	0	194
Jurgita Streimikyte	34	101	32	29	11	186
Deanna Jackson	34	77	23	17	12	162
Kelly Schumacher	34	68	14	10	24	135
Ebony Hoffman	33	97	16	21	10	120
Yolanda Paige	13	9	13	2	0	16
Jenni Benningfield	10	6	4	1	1	9
Coretta Brown	6	2	3	1	0	6

== Awards and honors ==
- Tamika Catchings, WNBA Defensive Player of the Year Award
