= Joy Cheek =

American basketball player (born 1988)

Ole Miss Rebels
- Title: Assistant coach
- League: Southeastern Conference

Personal information
- Born: June 25, 1988 (age 38) Hyattsville, Maryland
- Listed height: 6 ft 1 in (1.85 m)
- Listed weight: 201 lb (91 kg)

Career information
- High school: South Mecklenburg (Charlotte, North Carolina)
- College: Duke (2006–2010)
- WNBA draft: 2010: 3rd round, 35th overall pick
- Drafted by: Indiana Fever
- Playing career: 2010–2011
- Position: Forward
- Number: 21
- Coaching career: 2011–present

Career history

Playing
- 2010: Indiana Fever
- 2011: Washington Mystics

Coaching
- 2011–2013: Duke (assistant)
- 2013–2016: Ohio State (assistant)
- 2016–2018: Vanderbilt (assistant)
- 2018–2024: Clemson (assistant)
- 2024–present: Ole Miss (assistant)

Career highlights
- McDonald's All-American (2006); North Carolina Miss Basketball (2006)
- Stats at WNBA.com
- Stats at Basketball Reference

Joy Kristin Smith (née Cheek, born June 25, 1988) is an American former professional women's basketball player in the WNBA and current assistant coach for Ole Miss Rebels women's basketball team. Joy was born in Hyattsville, Maryland and attended South Mecklenburg High School in Charlotte, North Carolina.

She played college basketball at Duke University. One of 26 former Duke standouts to register over 1,000 career points, Cheek played in 137 contests in her four years. A four-year letterwinner from 2007 to 2010, she owns career averages of 8.4 points, 5.0 rebounds and 1.2 steals. As a senior, Cheek averaged 9.9 points, 5.9 rebounds, 1.5 steals and 1.3 assists as she started all 36 contests for the Blue Devils. She was named to the Memphis Regional All-Tournament team, All-ACC Tournament First Team, All-ACC Third Team and was a finalist for the Lowe's Senior Class Award.

Cheek was the 35th overall selection in the 2010 WNBA Draft by the Indiana Fever, playing in seven contests for the Fever before traveling overseas to play in Leszno, Poland. After signing a brief contract with the Washington Mystics to open the 2011 WNBA season, Cheek was prepared to play in Spain before accepting a job at Duke University as an assistant coach. She held this position from 2011 to 2013.

== Career statistics ==
=== WNBA career statistics ===
Legend
GP	Games played	GS	Games started	MPG	Minutes per game	RPG	Rebounds per game
APG	Assists per game	SPG	Steals per game	BPG	Blocks per game	PPG	Points per game
TO	Turnovers per game	FG%	Field-goal percentage	3P%	3-point field-goal percentage	FT%	Free-throw percentage
**Bold**	Career best	°	League leader

==== Regular season ====
Year	Team	GP	GS	MPG	FG%	3P%	FT%	RPG	APG	SPG	BPG	TO	PPG
2010	Indiana	**7**	0	4.9	**41.7**	**33.3**	100.0	0.4	**0.1**	0.0	0.0	0.7	**2.1**
2011	Washington	3	0	**5.3**	25.0	0.0	100.0	**1.0**	0.0	0.0	**0.3**	0.7	1.0
Career	2 years, 2 teams	10	0	5.0	37.5	25.0	100.0	0.6	0.1	0.0	0.1	0.7	1.8

=== Duke statistics ===
Legend
GP	Games played	GS	Games started	MPG	Minutes per game
FG%	Field goal percentage	3P%	3-point field goal percentage	FT%	Free throw percentage
RPG	Rebounds per game	APG	Assists per game	SPG	Steals per game
BPG	Blocks per game	PPG	Points per game	**Bold**	Career high

Year	Team	GP	Points	FG%	3P%	FT%	RPG	APG	SPG	BPG	PPG
2006–07	Duke	33	176	45.1	–	**75.0**	3.8	0.5	0.8	0.1	5.3
2007–08	Duke	35	334	**51.3**	**42.3**	68.1	5.3	0.7	1.2	0.3	9.5
2008–09	Duke	33	281	39.1	26.7	70.1	4.7	0.9	1.3	0.4	8.5
2009–10	Duke	**36**	**357**	37.6	32.7	68.4	**5.9**	**1.3**	**1.5**	**0.6**	**9.9**
Career	Duke	137	1148	42.5	31.5	70.1	5.0	0.9	1.2	0.3	8.4
