= Nora Ross =

American trap shooting champion

Nora Ross is an American trap shooting champion. She is known for being perhaps the best one-eye shooter in the United States. She's a 34-time All-American, 15-time All American Ladies Captain, and a 30-time Trap and Field Average winner. Ross is the first woman to break 200 in doubles. She was inducted into the Trapshooting Hall of Fame in 1999.
