= Jené Morris =

American basketball player (born 1987)

Free agent
- Position: Guard

Personal information
- Born: July 21, 1987 (age 39) San Francisco, California, U.S.
- Listed height: 5 ft 9 in (1.75 m)

Career information
- High school: The Urban School (San Francisco, California)
- College: California (2005–2006); San Diego State (2007–2010)
- WNBA draft: 2010: 1st round, 11th overall pick
- Drafted by: Indiana Fever
- Playing career: 2010–present

Career history
- 2010: Indiana Fever
- 2012: Tulsa Shock

Career highlights
- 2× MWC Defensive Player of the Year (2009, 2010); 2× All-MWC Defensive Team (2009, 2010); 2× First-team All-MWC (2009, 2010)
- Stats at WNBA.com
- Stats at Basketball Reference

Jené Morris (born July 21, 1987) is an American former professional basketball player in the Women's National Basketball Association (WNBA). She played college basketball for the San Diego State Aztecs.

== Career statistics ==
Legend
GP	Games played	GS	Games started	MPG	Minutes per game	RPG	Rebounds per game
APG	Assists per game	SPG	Steals per game	BPG	Blocks per game	PPG	Points per game
TO	Turnovers per game	FG%	Field-goal percentage	3P%	3-point field-goal percentage	FT%	Free-throw percentage
**Bold**	Career best	°	League leader

=== WNBA ===
==== Regular season ====
WNBA regular season statistics
Year	Team	GP	GS	MPG	FG%	3P%	FT%	RPG	APG	SPG	BPG	TO	PPG
2010	Indiana	**25**	0	7.8	**.424**	.368	**.667**	0.6	**0.5**	0.3	**0.1**	0.7	**2.9**
2011	Did not play (waived)												
2012	Tulsa	9	**1**	**9.1**	.375	**.444**	.500	**1.0**	0.2	**0.7**	0.0	**0.4**	1.9
**Career**	2 year, 2 teams	34	1	8.2	.415	.383	.600	0.7	0.4	0.4	0.1	0.6	2.6

==== Playoffs ====
WNBA playoff statistics
Year	Team	GP	GS	MPG	FG%	3P%	FT%	RPG	APG	SPG	BPG	TO	PPG
2010	Indiana	1	0	2.0	—	—	—	0.0	0.0	0.0	0.0	0.0	0.0
**Career**	1 year, 1 team	1	0	2.0	—	—	—	0.0	0.0	0.0	0.0	0.0	0.0

=== College ===
NCAA statistics
Year	Team	GP	GS	MPG	FG%	3P%	FT%	RPG	APG	SPG	BPG	TO	PPG
2007–08	California	27		31.1	.393	.286	.677	2.3	2.5	2.3	0.4	**2.9**	8.7
2006–07	San Diego State	Did not play (NCAA transfer rules)											
2007–08	San Diego State	31		29.0	.416	**.374**	.768	**2.9**	2.7	3.0	0.3	3.4	14.1
2008–09	San Diego State	30		30.4	.418	.322	.725	**2.9**	2.2	**3.3**	0.4	**2.9**	16.1
2009–10	San Diego State	**34**	34		**.433**	.345	**.790**	2.7	**2.9**	3.0	0.4	3.6	**17.1**
**Career**		122	—	—	.419	.335	.748	2.7	2.6	2.9	0.4	3.2	14.2

== Awards and honors ==
- State Farm Coaches' Honorable Mention All-American (2008–09)
- Mountain West Conference Defensive Player of the Year (2008–09)
- All-Mountain West Conference First Team (2008–09)
- Mountain West Conference All-Defensive Team (2008–09)
- Mountain West Conference Championship All-Tournament Team (2008 & 2009)
- San Diego Surf 'N Slam Tournament MVP (2008)
- Preseason All-Mountain West Conference (2008)
- All-Mountain West Conference Second Team (2008)
- Honorable Mention Pac-10 All-Freshman Team (2005–06)
