= Roneeka Hodges =

American basketball player (born 1982)

- Hodges with the Connecticut Sun in 2026

Houston Comets
- Title: Assistant coach
- League: WNBA

Personal information
- Born: July 19, 1982 (age 44) New Orleans, Louisiana, U.S.
- Listed height: 5 ft 11 in (1.80 m)
- Listed weight: 165 lb (75 kg)

Career information
- High school: O. P. Walker (New Orleans, Louisiana)
- College: LSU (2000–2003); Florida State (2004–2005)
- WNBA draft: 2005: 2nd round, 15th overall pick
- Drafted by: Houston Comets
- Playing career: 2005–2015
- Position: Guard
- Number: 5, 15
- Coaching career: 2019–present

Career history

Playing
- 2005–2008: Houston Comets
- 2005–2006: COB Calais
- 2006–2007: Adana ASKİ SK
- 2007–2008: CB Islas Canarias
- 2008–2009: Ros Casares Godella
- 2009: Baloncesto Rivas
- 2009: Minnesota Lynx
- 2009–2010: Adana ASKİ SK
- 2010: Lotos Gdynia
- 2010–2011: San Antonio Silver Stars
- 2010–2011: Bnot Herzliya
- 2011: Cortegada
- 2011: Tarbes Gespe Bigorre
- 2011–2012: İstanbul Üniversitesi SK
- 2012: Indiana Fever
- 2012–2014: Tulsa Shock
- 2012: CB Avenida
- 2012–2013: Americana
- 2014: Maranhao Basquete
- 2014–2015: Winnus Guri
- 2015: Atlanta Dream
- 2015–2016: Miskolc
- 2016–2017: Stadium Casablanca
- 2017–2018: Al-Riyadi Beirut
- 2019: Al-Qazeres

Coaching
- 2020–2021: Old Dominion University (Asst.)
- 2021–2022: Colgate University (Asst.)
- 2022–2024: New York Liberty (Asst.)
- 2025–2026: Connecticut Sun (Asst.)
- 2026–present: Phantom BC

Career highlights
- As player: First-team All-ACC (2005); As assistant coach: WNBA champion (2024); WNBA Commissioner's Cup Champion (2023)
- Stats at WNBA.com
- Stats at Basketball Reference
Medals
Women's basketball
Representing the USA
Pan American Games
Silver medal – second place	2003 Santo Domingo	Team

Roneeka Hodges (born July 19, 1982) is an American professional basketball coach and former player who is an assistant coach for the Houston Comets of the Women's National Basketball Association (WNBA). She played college basketball for the LSU Tigers and Florida State Seminoles. She was selected fifteenth overall by the Houston Comets in the 2005 WNBA draft and played in the WNBA for eleven seasons with the Comets, Minnesota Lynx, San Antonio Silver Stars, Indiana Fever, Tulsa Shock, and Atlanta Dream. Hodges also had an extensive playing career overseas, playing in many different countries until 2019.

Hodges started her coaching career in 2019 as a special advisor at LSU. She then worked as an assistant coach in the college ranks for the Old Dominion Monarchs and Colgate Raiders, before becoming an assistant coach in the WNBA with the New York Liberty and Connecticut Sun.

== Personal life ==
Born in New Orleans, Louisiana, she is the twin sister of former WNBA player Doneeka Hodges.

== Professional career ==
A 5'11" guard, Hodges played for three seasons with the Houston Comets, who selected her in the second round, 15th overall, in the 2005 WNBA draft. On February 6, 2008, Hodges was selected by the Atlanta Dream in the expansion draft. She was then traded to the Seattle Storm with the fourth pick for Seattle's eighth pick and Iziane Castro Marques. She was then waived by the Storm and signed once again with the Comets. Through three seasons with the Comets, Hodges scored 382 points, collected 112 rebounds, 66 assists, 32 steals, and 4 blocks. In 2006, she scored a career high 247 points, with her career high of 21 coming against the Washington Mystics.

After the Comets folded in the fall of 2008, the Minnesota Lynx selected Hodges as the fourth pick in the dispersal draft for the former Comets players.

== Coaching career ==
During the 2019–2020 college basketball season, Hodges worked as a special advisor to her alma mater LSU. The following academic year, she joined the coaching staff at Old Dominion University. In September 2021, she was named an assistant coach to the Colgate University women's basketball team.

In 2022, she joined the new coaching staff of the New York Liberty under Sandy Brondello.

In 2025, she joined the new coaching staff of the Connecticut Sun under Rachid Meziane, with a more expanded role than she had with the Liberty.

In 2026 she became the head coach for the Phantom Basketball Club as part of the 3-on-3 Unrivaled Basketball League. https://www.unrivaled.basketball/phantom

== WNBA career statistics ==
Legend
GP	Games played	GS	Games started	MPG	Minutes per game	RPG	Rebounds per game
APG	Assists per game	SPG	Steals per game	BPG	Blocks per game	PPG	Points per game
TO	Turnovers per game	FG%	Field-goal percentage	3P%	3-point field-goal percentage	FT%	Free-throw percentage
**Bold**	Career best	°	League leader

=== Regular season ===
Year	Team	GP	GS	MPG	FG%	3P%	FT%	RPG	APG	SPG	BPG	TO	PPG
2005	Houston	26	0	7.2	.277	.192	**1.000**	0.7	0.3	0.1	0.0	0.1	1.3
2006	Houston	33	8	21.2	.401	.367	.744	2.0	1.0	0.5	0.1	1.1	7.5
2007	Houston	29	4	11.4	.279	.299	.909	1.0	0.9	0.4	0.0	0.7	3.5
2008	Houston	15	6	18.3	**.423**	.371	**1.000**	1.9	1.2	0.3	0.2	0.5	7.3
2009	Minnesota	33	27	**27.3**	.417	.398	.909	3.0	**1.9**	0.5	**0.5**	1.1	9.9
2010	San Antonio	**34**	19	25.3	.357	.308	.758	**3.2**	1.4	0.4	0.3	1.2	7.7
2011	San Antonio	28	5	9.8	.404	**.400**	**1.000**	1.3	0.5	0.2	0.1	0.1	3.9
2012	Indiana	12	0	8.9	.318	.259	.500	0.6	0.6	0.3	**0.5**	0.3	3.2
2012	Tulsa	20	16	25.5	.420	.376	.773	2.7	1.9	**0.8**	0.2	1.7	**10.2**
2013	Tulsa	33	8	17.2	.387	.360	.875	1.2	1.0	0.5	0.1	0.5	5.0
2014	Tulsa	**34**	**34**	21.2	.346	.259	.793	1.8	1.4	0.5	0.1	0.6	5.3
2015	Atlanta	23	9	19.5	.382	.360	.750	2.0	1.3	0.2	0.2	1.0	6.4
Career	11 years, 6 teams	320	136	18.4	.379	.344	.803	1.8	1.1	0.4	0.2	0.8	6.0

=== Playoffs ===
Year	Team	GP	GS	MPG	FG%	3P%	FT%	RPG	APG	SPG	BPG	TO	PPG
2005	Houston	**2**	0	1.0	.000	.000	.000	0.0	0.0	**0.5**	0.0	0.5	0.0
2006	Houston	**2**	0	17.5	.294	.250	**.500**	**1.5**	0.5	0.0	0.0	0.0	7.0
2010	San Antonio	**2**	**2**	**28.5**	**.529**	.429	.000	**1.5**	1.5	0.0	0.0	1.5	**10.5**
2011	San Antonio	1	0	5.0	.500	**.500**	.000	0.0	**2.0**	0.0	0.0	0.0	3.0
Career	4 years, 2 teams	7	2	14.1	.417	.353	.500	0.9	0.9	0.1	0.0	0.6	5.4

== LSU and Florida State statistics ==
Legend
GP	Games played	GS	Games started	MPG	Minutes per game
FG%	Field goal percentage	3P%	3-point field goal percentage	FT%	Free throw percentage
RPG	Rebounds per game	APG	Assists per game	SPG	Steals per game
BPG	Blocks per game	PPG	Points per game	**Bold**	Career high

Year	Team	GP	Points	FG%	3P%	FT%	RPG	APG	SPG	BPG	PPG
2000-01	LSU	30	253	46.7	**38.2**	**75.5**	4.1	1.3	1.0	0.4	8.4
2001-02	LSU	30	266	44.9	30.3	72.1	5.3	1.4	0.9	0.7	8.9
2002-03	LSU	**34**	150	43.4	23.4	64.3	3.4	**2.1**	0.7	0.3	4.4
Career	LSU	94	669	45.3	29.9	71.0	4.2	1.6	0.9	0.5	7.1

Year	Team	GP	Points	FG%	3P%	FT%	RPG	APG	SPG	BPG	PPG
2004-05	Florida State	32	**615**	**46.8**	32.6	63.5	**5.6**	1.5	**1.1**	**0.8**	**19.2**
Career	Florida State	32	615	46.8	32.6	63.5	5.6	1.5	1.1	0.8	19.2
