= Michelle Snow =

American basketball player (born 1980)

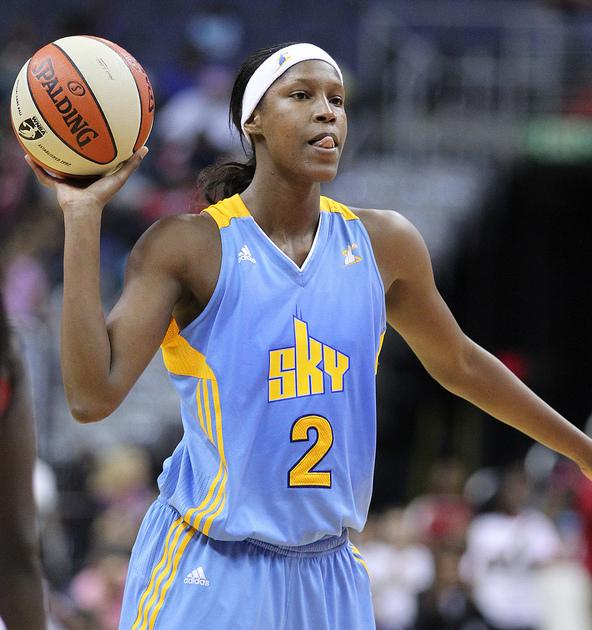
- Snow with the Chicago Sky in 2011

Personal information
- Born: March 20, 1980 (age 46) Pensacola, Florida, U.S.
- Listed height: 6 ft 5 in (1.96 m)
- Listed weight: 170 lb (77 kg)

Career information
- High school: Pensacola (Pensacola, Florida)
- College: Tennessee (1998–2002)
- WNBA draft: 2002: 1st round, 10th overall pick
- Drafted by: Houston Comets
- Playing career: 2002–2018
- Position: Power forward / center
- Number: 2

Career history
- 2002–2008: Houston Comets
- 2007–2008: Elitzur Ramla
- 2008–2009: Salamanca
- 2009: Houston Stealth
- 2009: Atlanta Dream
- 2009–2012: Dynamo Kursk
- 2010: San Antonio Silver Stars
- 2011: Chicago Sky
- 2012–2013: Washington Mystics
- 2014–2015: Mersin Büyükşehir Belediyesi
- 2015: Los Angeles Sparks
- 2016–2018: Mersin Büyükşehir Belediyesi

Career highlights
- 2× WNBA All-Star (2005, 2006); WNBA Most Improved Player (2003); NWBL champion (2003); Israeli National League champion (2008); EuroCup winner (2012); First-team All-SEC (2001)
- Stats at WNBA.com
- Stats at Basketball Reference
Medals
Women's Basketball
Representing United States
Jones Cup
Gold medal – first place	2000 Taipei	Team competition
World Championship
Bronze medal – third place	2006 Brazil	National team

Donnette Jé-Michelle Snow (born March 20, 1980) is an American former professional basketball player who played most recently in the Turkish Women's Basketball League.

== Early life ==
Born and raised in Pensacola, Florida, Snow led Pensacola High School to the state championship and was named "Miss Basketball" in 1998. Snow was named a WBCA All-American. She participated in the WBCA High School All-America Game

== College career ==
Snow was a psychology major at the University of Tennessee. She played alongside Tennessee graduates like Kara Lawson. On November 30, 2000, Snow became just the third woman in NCAA college basketball history to dunk during a game. She did so against the University of Illinois, University of South Carolina and Vanderbilt University.

== USA Basketball ==
She competed with USA Basketball as a member of the 2000 Jones Cup Team that won the Gold in Taipei.

Snow was named to the National Team representing the US at the 2006 World Championships, held in Barueri and São Paulo, Brazil. The team won eight of their nine contests, but the lone loss came in the semifinal medal round to Russia. The USA beat Brazil in the final game to earn the bronze medal. Snow averaged 2.8 points per game and was second on the team with six blocks.

== WNBA career ==
Snow was drafted 10th overall by the Houston Comets in the 1st round of the 2002 WNBA draft. Her nickname is "Shell". Snow has a 7'1" reach which helped her to become one of the best shot blockers in the WNBA.

In 2003, Snow was named most improved player of the year.

In the 2006 WNBA all-star game, Snow became the second WNBA player to dunk in an all-star game.

After the Comets disbanded in late 2008, she later played for the Atlanta Dream. She was traded to the San Antonio Silver Stars on March 11, 2010. She was again traded to the Chicago Sky on April 20, 2011. Snow signed with the Washington Mystics on February 9, 2012. On September 9, 2015, Snow signed with the Los Angeles Sparks for the rest of the season, only playing two games of the Sparks' season. She became a free agent at the end of the 2015 season.

== NWBL career ==
Snow played on the championship team of the 2003 Houston Stealth in the NWBL.

== Overseas career ==
She played for Elitzur Ramla in Israel during the 2007–08 WNBA off-season, winning a championship with the team. She had been playing for Salamanca in Spain during the 2008–09 WNBA off-season. During the 2009–2012 off-seasons she played for Dynamo Kursk in the Russian Superleague A, winning a EuroCup with the team in 2012.

In the 2014–2015 WNBA off-season, Snow played in the Turkish Superleague for Mersin Büyükşehir Belediyesi. In May 2016, Snow re-signed with Mersin Büyükşehir Belediyesi for the 2016–17 WNBA off-season. For the 2017–2018 season, which she announced would be her last, Snow first played at Bornova Becker (Turkey – KBSL) before moving to Adana ASKI Mersin in the same league, where she earned honorable mention for the All-League Teams.

== Career statistics ==
Legend
GP	Games played	GS	Games started	MPG	Minutes per game	RPG	Rebounds per game
APG	Assists per game	SPG	Steals per game	BPG	Blocks per game	PPG	Points per game
TO	Turnovers per game	FG%	Field-goal percentage	3P%	3-point field-goal percentage	FT%	Free-throw percentage
**Bold**	Career best	°	League leader

=== WNBA ===
==== Regular season ====
WNBA regular season statistics
Year	Team	GP	GS	MPG	FG%	3P%	FT%	RPG	APG	SPG	BPG	TO	PPG
2002	Houston	32	2	15.0	46.9	**50.0**	59.6	3.7	0.4	0.4	0.8	**0.7**	3.9
2003	Houston	**34**	**34**	**30.1**	49.8	0.0	72.9	7.7	1.2	1.0	**1.8**	2.0	9.2
2004	Houston	31	31	28.8	45.4	—	60.2	7.7	**1.0**	0.9	1.1	2.3	8.9
2005	Houston	33	33	29.3	55.1	—	70.8	6.8	1.2	0.6	1.2	2.0	12.0
2006	Houston	**34**	**34**	29.2	51.0	—	66.7	**7.9**	1.4	**1.0**	1.1	2.6	**13.0**
2007	Houston	**34**	**34**	26.2	49.3	—	76.8	6.8	1.4	0.5	1.0	2.7	10.8
2008	Houston	**34**	**34**	25.2	53.2	**50.0**	69.7	6.8	1.2	0.5	0.9	1.8	9.9
2009	Atlanta	**34**	2	14.8	47.9	0.0	76.1	4.3	0.5	0.4	0.5	1.1	5.4
2010	San Antonio	**34**	33	24.1	**57.4**	0.0	71.9	6.2	1.6	**1.0**	0.7	1.6	10.4
2011	Chicago	**34**	30	24.1	45.6	0.0	76.0	6.3	**1.9**	0.5	1.3	2.1	5.9
2012	Washington	32	21	20.1	52.3	0.0	77.8	5.4	0.6	0.6	0.8	1.7	5.9
2013	Washington	**34**	18	16.8	47.4	—	**82.4**	4.8	0.6	0.5	0.7	1.0	5.1
2014	Did not appear in league												
2015	Los Angeles	2	0	13.0	42.9	—	0.0	1.5	0.0	0.0	0.5	2.0	3.0
**Career**	13 years, 6 teams	402	306	23.6	50.6	18.2	70.4	6.2	1.1	0.7	1.0	1.8	8.4
**Career**	All-Star	2	0	15.7	50.0	—	66.6	7.0	1.0	0.5	0.5	0.0	8.0

==== Playoffs ====
WNBA playoff statistics
Year	Team	GP	GS	MPG	FG%	3P%	FT%	RPG	APG	SPG	BPG	TO	PPG
2002	Houston	3	0	26.3	33.3	0.0	87.5	7.0	1.3	0.0	0.7	1.7	6.3
2003	Houston	3	3	29.7	40.0	—	62.5	**9.7**	1.7	**1.3**	1.3	1.7	8.3
2005	Houston	**5**	**5**	**30.4**	52.9	—	69.6	5.4	0.8	1.0	0.6	3.2	10.4
2006	Houston	2	2	28.5	**58.8**	—	91.7	6.0	**2.0**	1.0	**3.0**	**1.0**	**15.5**
2009	Atlanta	2	0	16.5	30.0	—	60.0	4.0	0.5	0.0	1.0	**1.0**	4.5
2010	San Antonio	2	2	19.0	33.3	—	66.7	4.0	**2.0**	0.5	0.0	1.5	7.0
2013	Washington	3	0	12.0	36.4	—	**100.0**	5.7	0.3	0.3	1.7	**1.0**	3.3
**Career**	7 years, 4 teams	20	12	24.2	43.1	0.0	75.0	6.1	1.2	0.7	1.1	1.8	8.0

=== College ===
NCAA statistics
Year	Team	GP	Points	FG%	3P%	FT%	RPG	APG	SPG	BPG	PPG
1998–99	Tennessee	34	290	**60.0**	—	51.9	6.4	0.4	0.7	1.4	8.5
1999–00	Tennessee	**37**	**435**	55.5	0.0	62.9	6.3	0.4	**0.8**	1.3	11.8
2000–01	Tennessee	33	365	57.2	—	60.8	**6.8**	**0.8**	0.6	1.4	11.1
2001–02	Tennessee	33	407	50.4	—	**75.3**	6.5	0.5	0.7	**1.7**	**12.3**
**Career**		137	1497	55.3	0.0	63.9	6.5	0.5	0.7	1.4	10.9
