= Crystal Kelly =

American basketball player (born 1986)

Kentucky Wildcats
- Position: Assistant coach
- League: SEC

Personal information
- Born: September 15, 1986 (age 40) Louisville, Kentucky, U.S.
- Listed height: 6 ft 2 in (1.88 m)
- Listed weight: 190 lb (86 kg)

Career information
- High school: Sacred Heart Academy (Louisville, Kentucky)
- College: Western Kentucky (2004–2008)
- WNBA draft: 2008: 3rd round, 31st overall pick
- Drafted by: Houston Comets

Career history

Playing
- 2008–2009: Sacramento Monarchs
- 2009: Detroit Shock
- 2010: San Antonio Silver Stars

Coaching
- 2012–2016: Bellarmine (Asst.)
- 2016–2017: Tennessee Tech (Asst.)
- 2017–2019: Xavier (Asst.)
- 2019–2020: Tennessee Tech (Asst.)
- 2020–2021: Bellarmine (Asst.)
- 2021–2023: Towson (Associate HC)
- 2023–present: Kentucky (Asst.)

Career highlights
- Sun Belt Player of the Year (2008); Sun Belt Freshman of the Year (2005); 4× First-team All-Sun Belt (2005–2008); Kentucky Miss Basketball (2004)
- Stats at WNBA.com
- Stats at Basketball Reference

Crystal Kelly (born September 15, 1986) is an American former professional basketball player and current assistant coach for the Kentucky Wildcats women's basketball team.

== High school ==
Kelly played for Sacred Heart Academy in Louisville, Kentucky, where she was named a WBCA All-American. In addition, Kelly was named the 2004 Kentucky Miss Basketball. She participated in the 2004 WBCA High School All-America Game where she scored four points.

== College ==
Kelly attended college at Western Kentucky University, where she was a standout basketball player. She broke the WKU women's basketball program record for career rebounds, and earned a place in the top 25 career scorers in NCAA Division I women's basketball history by scoring over 2,600 points. In her senior year, she led the nation with a 64.8% field goal shooting percentage. Kelly was named to the all-Sun Belt Conference team during each of her four collegiate seasons, and was named the 2008 Sun Belt Player of the Year in her senior season. She graduated with a bachelor's degree in public relations in 2008.

== Career statistics ==
Legend
GP	Games played	GS	Games started	MPG	Minutes per game	RPG	Rebounds per game
APG	Assists per game	SPG	Steals per game	BPG	Blocks per game	PPG	Points per game
TO	Turnovers per game	FG%	Field-goal percentage	3P%	3-point field-goal percentage	FT%	Free-throw percentage
**Bold**	Career best	°	League leader

=== WNBA ===
==== Regular season ====
Year	Team	GP	GS	MPG	FG%	3P%	FT%	RPG	APG	SPG	BPG	TO	PPG
2008	Sacramento	**33**	**4**	**16.7**	**44.9**	0.0	**85.0**	**3.3**	**0.5**	**0.5**	**0.2**	1.2	**7.4**
2009	Sacramento	23	**4**	12.3	43.9	0.0	84.2	1.7	0.3	0.3	0.1	1.0	4.3
2009	Detroit	11	0	7.6	36.4	0.0	83.3	1.3	0.4	0.4	0.1	1.0	2.8
2010	San Antonio	26	0	9.3	44.0	**100.0**	73.9	1.2	0.3	0.3	0.0	**0.9**	3.0
Career	3 years, 3 teams	93	8	12.5	43.8	33.3	82.8	2.1	0.4	0.4	0.1	1.0	4.8

==== Playoffs ====
Year	Team	GP	GS	MPG	FG%	3P%	FT%	RPG	APG	SPG	BPG	TO	PPG
2008	Sacramento	**3**	**3**	**26.7**	**70.0**	0.0	90.0	**3.3**	**1.3**	**0.3**	0.0	0.7	**12.3**
2009	Detroit	**3**	0	5.0	0.0	0.0	**100.0**	0.7	0.7	0.0	0.0	**0.0**	1.3
2010	San Antonio	1	0	6.0	0.0	0.0	50.0	2.0	0.0	0.0	0.0	**0.0**	1.0
Career	3 years, 3 teams	7	3	14.4	63.6	0.0	87.5	2.0	0.9	0.1	0.0	0.3	6.0

=== College ===
Legend
GP	Games played	GS	Games started	MPG	Minutes per game
FG%	Field goal percentage	3P%	3-point field goal percentage	FT%	Free throw percentage
RPG	Rebounds per game	APG	Assists per game	SPG	Steals per game
BPG	Blocks per game	PPG	Points per game	**Bold**	Career high

Year	Team	GP	Points	FG%	3P%	FT%	RPG	APG	SPG	BPG	PPG
2004–05	Western Kentucky	30	579	.611	.000	.737	10.4	1.2	1.2	**1.1**	19.3
2005–06	Western Kentucky	**34**	687	.601	.000	.761	8.5	1.3	**1.4**	0.9	20.2
2006–07	Western Kentucky	32	**770**	.611	**.318**	.774	9.4	1.3	1.3	0.7	**24.1**
2007–08	Western Kentucky	**34**	767	**.644**	.294	**.825**	**10.5**	**1.9**	1.2	1.0	22.6
Career		130	2,803	.617	.308	.778	9.7	1.4	1.3	0.9	21.6

== Professional ==
Following her collegiate career, Kelly was selected in the third round (31st overall) in the 2008 WNBA draft by the Houston Comets. The Comets waived Kelly in May 2008, but a few days later she was signed to the Sacramento Monarchs.

Kelly averaged 7 points per game in 16 minutes per game as a backup to starting forward Rebekkah Brunson during the 2008 regular season. Then an injury to Brunson allowed Kelly to become a starter and a notable scorer during the WNBA Playoffs. In the Monarchs' victory over the San Antonio Silver Stars in Game 2 of the Western Conference semifinals, Kelly led all scorers with 19 points.

Following her WNBA career, Kelly was hired as an assistant coach for the Women's Basketball team at Tennessee Tech, then later at Bellarmine University. Following these five years of coaching, Kelly was hired as Xavier University's Women's Basketball Assistant Coach.
