= Ashley Battle =

American basketball player (born 1982)

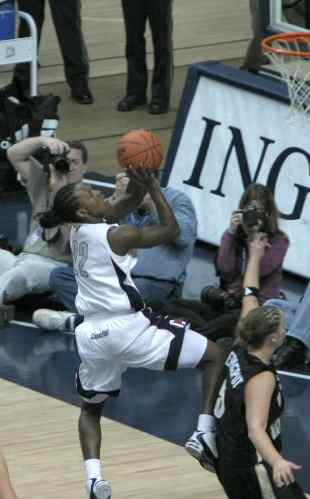

Personal information
- Born: May 31, 1982 (age 44) Pittsburgh, Pennsylvania, U.S.
- Listed height: 6 ft 0 in (1.83 m)
- Listed weight: 170 lb (77 kg)

Career information
- High school: Linsly School (Wheeling, West Virginia)
- College: UConn (2000–2005)
- WNBA draft: 2005: 2nd round, 25th overall pick
- Drafted by: Seattle Storm
- Playing career: 2005–2010
- Position: Forward
- Number: 45, 22

Career history
- 2005: Seattle Storm
- 2006–2009: New York Liberty
- 2010: San Antonio Silver Stars

Career highlights
- 3× NCAA champion (2002–2004); Big East Defensive Player of the Year (2003)
- Stats at WNBA.com
- Stats at Basketball Reference
Medals
Women's basketball
FIBA Under-18 Americas Championship
Gold medal – first place	2000 Argentina	Team

Ashley Battle (born May 31, 1982) is an American former professional basketball player who currently serves as the vice president of basketball operations for the Portland Fire of the Women's National Basketball Association (WNBA). She played in the WNBA for the Seattle Storm, New York Liberty, and San Antonio Silver Stars. Drafted by the Storm in 2005, she played two games for them before being waived. She played for the Liberty for the 2006 through 2009 seasons. Battle played collegiately for the University of Connecticut women's basketball team.

== Early life ==
Battle is an only child to a single mother. She started playing basketball at an early age with her cousins. When she was in the fifth grade at Manchester Elementary School in Pittsburgh, she was the only girl on the boys' basketball team. While playing at a school tournament, a few Amateur Athletic Union coaches saw Battle and soon recruited her to play for them. During the AAU tournaments, Battle met and became friends with Maria Conlon and Diana Taurasi.

== Amateur career ==
=== High school ===
During her high school years, she was looking to get away from Pittsburgh, so she decided to attend The Linsly School, a boarding school in Wheeling, West Virginia that was strong academically. Linsly was known for academics and not basketball, a reputation Battle helped change. In her junior season, the team went undefeated. Battle set school records in points, rebounds, assists, steals, and set the trend with more good female basketball players coming to the school to play. Battle was named a WBCA All-American. She participated in the 2000 WBCA High School All-America Game, where she scored three points.

=== College ===
Battle's first choice for college was Stanford University. Stanford wanted Battle to come for her visit in the spring of her senior year in high school. However, Battle wanted to make a decision and sign her commitment letter during the early signing period in the fall of her senior year which meant Stanford was not an option. She narrowed her choices to Duke University, Pennsylvania State University, and University of Connecticut. Battle's mom preferred Duke, as basketball was on the rise, the education was great, and it was within driving distance from Pittsburgh. Battle had a tough time deciding between UConn and Duke. Her AAU friends Maria Conlon and Diana Taurasi had already committed to UConn so she decided to follow them there. Battle's freshman year at UConn started great. She consistently got playing time until she injured her elbow in a game against Miami. Since it was only the fifth game of the season, she was granted a red-shirt. In 2002 the Huskies went undefeated and won the national championship. They would go on to also win the 2003 and 2004 championships. During the 2003 season, Battle earned the Big East Defensive Player of the Year award. She graduated from UConn with a bachelor's degree in Marketing and Economics.

== USA Basketball ==
Battle was a member of the USA Women's U18 team which won the gold medal at the FIBA Americas Championship in Mar Del Plata, Argentina. The event was held in July 2000, when the USA team defeated Cuba to win the championship. Battle helped the team win all five games, scoring 5.4 points per game.

== Professional career ==
=== WNBA ===
Battle was selected by the Seattle Storm at No. 25 in the 2005 WNBA draft, but played in only two games that year. After the 2005 season, she was signed by the New York Liberty. In 2006, Battle played in thirty-three games and developed a reputation as a key defensive weapon for the Liberty. In 2007, she played in thirty-four regular-season games, averaging 22 minutes per game, 7.4 points per game, 3.7 rebounds per game, and 1.0 steals per game.

=== International ===
During the 2006 WNBA off-season, Battle played for the Spanish professional basketball team Universitario de Ferrol. Next two campaigns she played in Gran Canaria y Leon, and now she is playing with Asefa Estudiantes.

== Career statistics ==
Legend
GP	Games played	GS	Games started	MPG	Minutes per game	RPG	Rebounds per game
APG	Assists per game	SPG	Steals per game	BPG	Blocks per game	PPG	Points per game
TO	Turnovers per game	FG%	Field-goal percentage	3P%	3-point field-goal percentage	FT%	Free-throw percentage
**Bold**	Career best	°	League leader

*	Denotes season(s) in which Battle won an NCAA Championship

=== WNBA ===
==== Regular season ====
WNBA regular season statistics
Year	Team	GP	GS	MPG	FG%	3P%	FT%	RPG	APG	SPG	BPG	TO	PPG
2005	Seattle	2	0	4.0	**50.0**	—	—	1.0	0.0	0.0	0.0	0.5	1.0
2006	New York	33	2	13.8	38.3	32.6	**80.0**	1.9	0.9	0.9	**0.1**	1.2	4.3
2007	New York	**34**	**5**	**22.3**	36.5	31.2	77.6	**3.7**	**1.6**	**1.0**	**0.1**	1.4	**7.4**
2008	New York	34	0	9.9	37.8	36.7	72.0	1.6	0.7	0.4	0.0	0.8	3.6
2009	New York	34	3	16.1	42.6	**41.3**	69.6	2.5	1.2	0.9	**0.1**	**1.5**	5.2
2010	San Antonio	5	0	7.0	33.3	0.0	—	1.8	0.2	0.0	0.0	0.6	1.6
**Career**	6 years, 3 teams	142	10	15.1	38.4	33.6	74.3	2.4	1.1	0.8	0.1	1.2	5.0

==== Playoffs ====
WNBA playoff statistics
Year	Team	GP	GS	MPG	FG%	3P%	FT%	RPG	APG	SPG	BPG	TO	PPG
2007	New York	3	0	**21.0**	35.7	0.0	50.0	2.3	1.3	0.3	0.0	**0.3**	**3.7**
2008	New York	**6**	0	15.5	**36.4**	33.3	—	2.2	1.5	**0.8**	**0.2**	0.5	3.2
2010	San Antonio	2	0	17.0	20.0	**50.0**	**75.0**	**3.0**	**2.0**	0.5	0.0	0.5	3.0
**Career**	3 years, 2 teams	11	0	17.3	34.1	30.8	66.7	2.4	1.5	0.6	0.1	0.5	3.3

=== College ===
University of Connecticut statistics
Year	G	FG	FGA	PCT	3FG	3FGA	PCT	FT	FTA	PCT	REB	AVG	A	TO	B	S	MIN	PTS	AVG
2000–01	5	9	13	0.692	0	0	0	3	8	0.375	14	2.8	7	12	0	9	52	21	4.2
2001–02*	39	77	172	0.448	8	32	0.25	50	74	0.676	183	4.7	49	56	6	35	653	212	5.4
2002–03*	37	118	245	0.482	7	26	0.269	64	95	0.674	198	5.4	70	69	7	55	828	307	8.3
2003–04*	35	93	179	0.412	7	17	0.412	63	76	0.829	153	4.4	50	56	6	56	674	256	7.3
2004–05	33	95	229	0.415	21	70	0.3	47	60	0.783	148	4.5	59	65	5	36	673	258	7.8
Totals	149	392	838	0.468	43	145	0.297	227	313	0.725	696	4.7	235	258	24	191	2880	1054	7.1

== Post-playing career ==
=== Huskies of Honor induction ===
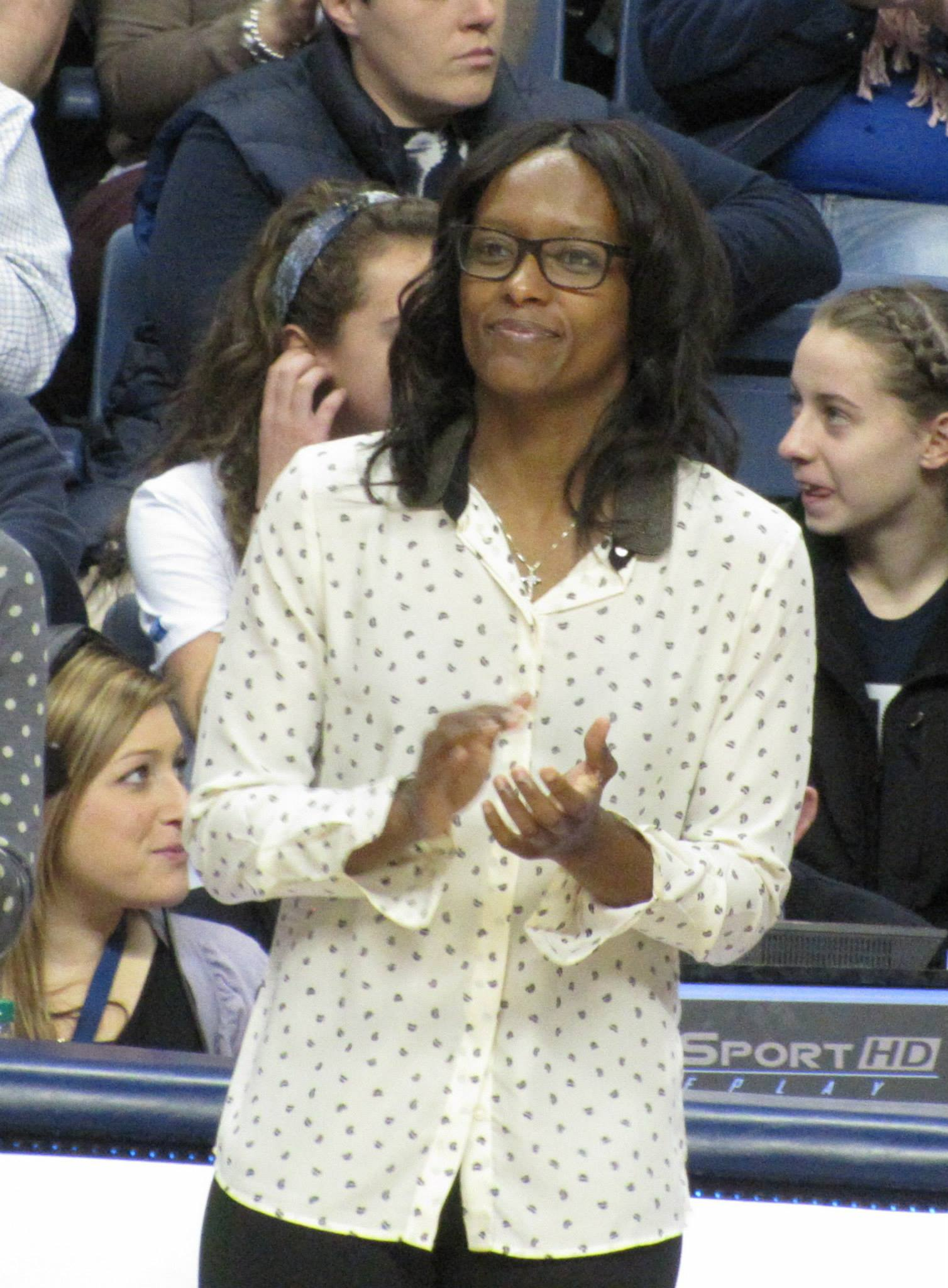
Ashley Battle at induction ceremony

On December 29, 2013, the University of Connecticut inducted two women's basketball team, the National Championship winning teams of 2002–03 and 2003–04 into the Huskies of Honor. Battle was a player for each of those two teams.

=== Coaching career ===
==== Boston Celtics ====
In September 2020, Battle joined the Boston Celtics organization as a scout.

==== Portland Fire ====
On October 14, 2025, the Portland Fire of the Women's National Basketball Association hired Battle to serve as their Vice President, Basketball Operations, Strategy and Innovation.

== See also ==
- Connecticut Huskies women's basketball
- List of Connecticut women's basketball players with 1000 points
- 2003–04 Connecticut Huskies women's basketball team
