= 2009 Indiana Fever season =

10th season in the WNBA

- Head coach: Lin Dunn
- Arena: Conseco Fieldhouse

Results
- Record: 22–12 (.647)
- Place: 1st (Eastern)
- Playoff finish: Lost WNBA Finals 3–2 (Phoenix)

Media
- Television: FSN Indiana

The 2009 Indiana Fever season was their 10th season in the Women's National Basketball Association (WNBA). The Fever attempted to advance to the WNBA Playoffs for the fifth consecutive season and were successful. The Fever reached their first WNBA Finals, but fell short in 5 games to the Phoenix Mercury.

== Offseason ==
=== Dispersal draft ===
Based on the Fever's 2008 record, they would pick 6th in the Houston Comets dispersal draft. The Fever picked Erica White.

=== WNBA draft ===
The following are the Fever's selections in the 2009 WNBA draft.

Round	Pick	Player	Nationality	School/Team/Country
1	6	Briann January	United States	Arizona State
2	19	Christina Wirth	United States	Vanderbilt
3	22	Danielle Campbell	United States	Purdue

=== Transactions ===
- June 17: The Fever signed Jessica Davenport and waived Yolanda Griffith.
- June 11: The Fever signed Jessica Moore and Eshaya Murphy and waived Erica White and Kadijah Whittington.
- June 4: The Fever waived Danielle Campbell and Tan White.
- May 21: The Fever waived Doneeka Lewis and Sherill Baker.
- May 4: The Fever signed Tamecka Dixon.
- April 20: The Fever waived Allison Feaster.
- March 4: The Fever signed Sherill Baker and Doneeka Lewis to a training camp contracts.
- February 20: The Fever signed Yolanda Griffith.
- January 8: The Fever re-signed free agent Tully Bevilaqua to a multiyear contract and waived Kristen Mann.

=== Free agents ===
==== Additions ====
Player	Signed	Former team
Tully Bevilaqua	January 8, 2009	re-signed
Tamecka Dixon	May 4, 2009	Houston Comets
Jessica Moore	June 11, 2009	Los Angeles Sparks
Eshaya Murphy	June 11, 2009	Washington Mystics
Jessica Davenport	June 17, 2009	New York Liberty

==== Subtractions ====
Player	Left	New team
Kristen Mann	January 8, 2009	Washington Mystics
Bernadette Ngoyisa	March 16, 2009	San Antonio Silver Stars
Allison Feaster	April 20, 2009	free agent
Sherill Baker	May 21, 2009	free agent
Doneeka Lewis	May 21, 2009	free agent
Danielle Campbell	June 4, 2009	free agent
Tan White	June 4, 2009	free agent
Khadijah Whittington	June 11, 2009	free agent
LaToya Bond	2009	free agent

== Roster ==
2009 Indiana Fever roster
Players
Coaches

Pos.	No.	Nat.	Name	Height	Weight	From
PG	41	(Australia)	Bevilaqua, Tully (C)	5' 7" (1.7m)	145 lb (66kg)	Australia
SF	24	(United States)	Catchings, Tamika (C)	6' 1" (1.85m)	167 lb (76kg)	Tennessee
C	50	(United States)	Davenport, Jessica	6' 5" (1.96m)	215 lb (98kg)	Ohio State
SG	21	(United States)	Dixon, Tamecka	5' 9" (1.75m)	148 lb (67kg)	Kansas
G/F	23	(United States)	Douglas, Katie	6' 0" (1.83m)	165 lb (75kg)	Purdue
PF	32	(United States)	Hoffman, Ebony	6' 2" (1.88m)	215 lb (98kg)	USC
PG	20	(United States)	January, Briann	5' 8" (1.73m)	160 lb (73kg)	Arizona State
F/C	31	(United States)	Moore, Jessica	6' 3" (1.91m)	175 lb (79kg)	Connecticut
SG	14	(United States)	Murphy, Eshaya	5' 11" (1.8m)	164 lb (74kg)	USC
C	8	(Canada)	Sutton-Brown, Tammy	6' 4" (1.93m)	200 lb (91kg)	Rutgers
SF	34	(United States)	Wirth, Christina	6' 1" (1.85m)	185 lb (84kg)	Vanderbilt

Head coach
(United States) Lin Dunn (UT Martin)
Assistant coaches
(United States) Gary Kloppenburg (UC San Diego)
(United States) Jim Lewis (West Virginia)
Athletic trainer
(United States) Craig Stull
Strength and conditioning coach
(United States) Brandon Johnson (Purdue)

Legend

- (C) Team captain
- (DP) Unsigned draft pick
- (FA) Free agent
- (S) Suspended
- Injured

WNBA roster page

== Season standings ==
Eastern Conference	W	L	PCT	GB	Home	Road	Conf.
Indiana Fever ^{x}	22	12	.647	–	14–3	8–9	17–5
Atlanta Dream ^{x}	18	16	.529	4.0	12–5	6–11	10–12
Detroit Shock ^{x}	18	16	.529	4.0	11–6	7–10	11–11
Washington Mystics ^{x}	16	18	.471	6.0	11–6	5–12	10–12
Chicago Sky ^{o}	16	18	.471	6.0	12–5	4–13	10–12
Connecticut Sun ^{o}	16	18	.471	6.0	12–5	4–13	9–12
New York Liberty ^{o}	13	21	.382	9.0	8–9	5–12	8–13

== Schedule ==
=== Preseason ===
2009 Game Log: Preseason

Game	Date	Time (ET)	Opponent	Score	High points	High rebounds	High assists	Location/Attendance	Record
1	May 23	1:00 pm	@ Minnesota	68–51	Douglas (19)	Sutton-Brown (5)	Catchings, January (3)	Claire Lynch Hall; 475	1–0
2	May 28	7:00 pm	Chicago	74–67	Douglas (15)	Sutton-Brown (7)	Catchings, January (3)	Conseco Fieldhouse; 6,457	2–0
3	June 2	10:00 pm	@ San Antonio	67–60	Catchings (16)	Whittington (6)	Catchings (4)	Austin Convention Center; N/A	3–0

=== Regular season ===
2009 Game Log: Regular Season
June

Game	Date	Time (ET)	Opponent	TV	Score	High points	High rebounds	High assists	Location/Attendance	Record
1	June 6	7:00 pm	@ Atlanta		86–87 (2OT)	Douglas (22)	Catchings (9)	January (5)	Philips Arena; 8,709	0–1
2	June 7	7:00 pm	Minnesota	FSI	74–96	Griffith (17)	Griffith (7)	White (4)	Conseco Fieldhouse; 9,234	0–2
3	June 9	7:00 pm	Seattle	ESPN2	73–66	Douglas (20)	Sutton-Brown (10)	Hoffman (4)	Conseco Fieldhouse; 7,253	1–2
4	June 12	7:00 pm	Los Angeles		73–61	Hoffman (14)	Bevilaqua, Catchings, Sutton-Brown (5)	Catchings, Douglas (5)	Conseco Fieldhouse; 9,320	2–2
5	June 19	7:30 pm	@ Detroit		66–54	Catchings (15)	Sutton-Brown (9)	Catchings (4)	Palace of Auburn Hills; 7,725	3–2
6	June 21	6:00 pm	Detroit	NBA TV; FSI	82–70	Douglas (23)	Sutton-Brown (9)	Catchings (6)	Conseco Fieldhouse; 7,610	4–2
7	June 26	7:30 pm	@ New York		82–81 (OT)	Douglas (28)	Hoffman (14)	Douglas (4)	Madison Square Garden; 9,304	5–2
8	June 27	7:00 pm	New York	MSG	63–54	Hoffman (14)	Catchings (11)	Catchings (4)	Conseco Fieldhouse; 8,481	6–2

July

Game	Date	Time (ET)	Opponent	TV	Score	High points	High rebounds	High assists	Location/Attendance	Record
9	July 2	7:00 pm	Connecticut	NBA TV; FSI	67–53	Douglas, Sutton-Brown (14)	Sutton-Brown (14)	Catchings (5)	Conseco Fieldhouse; 6,468	7–2
10	July 5	6:00 pm	Atlanta		78–74	Sutton-Brown (22)	Catchings, Sutton-Brown (9)	Catchings (5)	Conseco Fieldhouse; 7,024	8–2
11	July 10	8:30 pm	@ Chicago		83–54	Murphy (15)	Sutton-Brown (7)	Hoffman, January (6)	UIC Pavilion; 4,021	9–2
12	July 15	1:00 pm	Chicago		84–74	Sutton-Brown (22)	Catchings (8)	Catchings, Douglas (8)	Conseco Fieldhouse; 10,050	10–2
13	July 17	7:00 pm	Atlanta		84–79	Douglas (25)	Catchings (8)	Bevilaqua (5)	Conseco Fieldhouse; 7,975	11–2
14	July 19	3:00 pm	@ Connecticut		61–67	Douglas, Hoffman (15)	Hoffman (6)	Catchings, Douglas (4)	Mohegan Sun Arena; 6,517	11–3
15	July 21	7:00 pm	@ Washington		82–70	Catchings (28)	Catchings (10)	Bevilaqua (8)	Verizon Center; 9,798	12–3
16	July 23	12:30 pm	@ San Antonio		65–84	Davenport (13)	Davenport (6)	January (6)	AT&T Center; 9,985	12–4
17	July 28	7:00 pm	Washington		85–81	Douglas (34)	Hoffman (10)	Bevilaqua, Douglas (3)	Conseco Fieldhouse; 5,904	13–4
18	July 30	7:00 pm	Connecticut	FSI	94–85 (OT)	Douglas (32)	Hoffman (8)	Bevilaqua (4)	Conseco Fieldhouse; 6,538	14–4

August

Game	Date	Time (ET)	Opponent	TV	Score	High points	High rebounds	High assists	Location/Attendance	Record
19	August 2	4:00 pm	@ Washington		87–79	Douglas (24)	Catchings (9)	Catchings (5)	Verizon Center; 11,595	15–4
20	August 5	7:00 pm	Chicago	NBA TV; CN100	76–67	Douglas (14)	Murphy (7)	Bevilaqua, January (3)	Conseco Fieldhouse; 6,581	16–4
21	August 8	10:00 pm	@ Phoenix		90–83	Douglas (28)	Douglas (10)	Catchings, Douglas (5)	US Airways Center; 9,867	17–4
22	August 10	10:30 pm	@ Los Angeles		63–75	Douglas (16)	Catchings, Moore (6)	Hoffman (3)	STAPLES Center; 8,263	17–5
23	August 13	8:00 pm	@ Minnesota		91–81	Hoffman (24)	Hoffman (10)	Bevilaqua, Dixon (4)	Target Center; 7,156	18–5
24	August 15	7:00 pm	Detroit		82–59	Douglas (19)	Catchings (9)	Douglas (4)	Conseco Fieldhouse; 9,963	19–5
25	August 20	10:00 pm	@ Sacramento		62–67	Douglas (21)	Catchings (9)	January (6)	ARCO Arena; 6,290	19–6
26	August 22	10:00 pm	@ Seattle		60–74	Douglas (12)	Catchings, Hoffman (7)	Catchings (7)	KeyArena; 8,273	19–7
27	August 27	7:00 pm	San Antonio	NBA TV; FSI	Catchings (20)		Catchings (8)	Bevilaqua, Douglas (3)	Conseco Fieldhouse; 6,836	20–7
28	August 29	7:00 pm	Sacramento		78–79	Douglas (24)	Sutton-Brown (7)	Bevilaqua (6)	Conseco Fieldhouse; 8,579	20–8

September

Game	Date	Time (ET)	Opponent	TV	Score	High points	High rebounds	High assists	Location/Attendance	Record
29	September 2	7:00 pm	Phoenix	NBA TV; FSI	90–106	Catchings (27)	Catchings (12)	Catchings (5)	Conseco Fieldhouse; 7,446	20–9
30	September 4	7:30 pm	@ Detroit		63–70 (OT)	Catchings (14)	Catchings (13)	4 players (3)	Palace of Auburn Hills; 7,230	20–10
31	September 6	4:00 pm	Washington		72–61	Catchings (20)	Sutton-Brown (11)	Hoffman (4)	Conseco Fieldhouse; 9,702	21–10
32	September 8	7:30 pm	@ New York		69–63	Catchings, Douglas (17)	Catchings (10)	Douglas (4)	Madison Square Garden; 7,583	22–10
33	September 10	8:00 pm	@ Chicago		79–86	Douglas (25)	Catchings (10)	Douglas, January (4)	UIC Pavilion; 2,902	22–11
34	September 13	3:00 pm	@ Connecticut	WCTX	85–95	Catchings, Davenport, Dixon, Murphy (13)	Murphy (6)	Wirth (7)	Mohegan Sun Arena; 9,047	22–12

All games are viewable on WNBA LiveAccess

=== Postseason ===
2009 Game Log: Postseason
Eastern Conference Semifinals

Game	Date	Time (ET)	Opponent	TV	Score	High points	High rebounds	High assists	Location/Attendance	Series
1	September 17	7:00 pm	@ Washington	ESPN2	88–79	Catchings (26)	Catchings (12)	Bevilaqua, Catchings, January (3)	Comcast Center; 6,332	1–0
2	September 19	7:00 pm	Washington	NBA TV	81–74 (OT)	Catchings (24)	Catchings (16)	Catchings, Douglas (5)	Conseco Fieldhouse; 9,655	2–0

Eastern Conference Finals

Game	Date	Time (ET)	Opponent	TV	Score	High points	High rebounds	High assists	Location/Attendance	Series
1	September 23	8:00 pm	@ Detroit	ESPN2	56–72	Douglas (16)	Catchings (11)	Bevilaqua, Douglas (5)	Palace of Auburn Hills; 7,214	0–1
2	September 25	7:00 pm	Detroit	NBA TV	79–75	Catchings (22)	Catchings (9)	Catchings (5)	Conseco Fieldhouse; 9,210	1–1
3	September 26	7:00 pm	Detroit	NBA TV	72–67	Sutton-Brown (17)	Catchings (8)	Catchings (5)	Conseco Fieldhouse; 18,165	2–1

WNBA Finals

Game	Date	Time (ET)	Opponent	TV	Score	High points	High rebounds	High assists	Location/Attendance	Series
1	September 29	9:00 pm	@ Phoenix	ESPN2	116–120 (OT)	Douglas (30)	Hoffman (8)	January (7)	US Airways Center; 11,617	0–1
2	October 1	9:00 pm	@ Phoenix	ESPN2	93–84	Catchings (19)	Catchings (9)	Catchings (11)	US Airways Center; 16,758	1–1
3	October 4	4:00 pm	Phoenix	ESPN2	86–85	Hoffman (18)	Catchings (12)	Catchings, Douglas (7)	Conseco Fieldhouse; 18,165	2–1
4	October 7	7:30 pm	Phoenix	ESPN2	77–90	Catchings (24)	Catchings (12)	Catchings, Douglas (4)	Conseco Fieldhouse; 18,165	2–2
5	October 9	9:00 pm	@ Phoenix	ESPN2	86–94	Sutton-Brown (22)	Catchings (9)	Douglas (9)	US Airways Center; 17,313	2–3

== Regular season statistics ==
Legend
GP	Games played	GS	Games started	MPG	Minutes per game	RPG	Rebounds per game
APG	Assists per game	SPG	Steals per game	BPG	Blocks per game	PPG	Points per game
FG%	Field-goal percentage	3P%	3-point field-goal percentage	FT%	Free-throw percentage	TO	Turnovers per game
PF	Fouls per game		Team leader		League leader

=== Player statistics ===
Player	GP	GS	MPG	RPG	APG	SPG	BPG	PPG
Tully Bevilaqua	0	0	00.0	0.0	0.0	0.00	0.00	0.0
Tamika Catchings	0	0	00.0	0.0	0.0	0.00	0.00	0.0
Jessica Davenport	0	0	00.0	0.0	0.0	0.00	0.00	0.0
Tamecka Dixon	0	0	00.0	0.0	0.0	0.00	0.00	0.0
Katie Douglas	0	0	00.0	0.0	0.0	0.00	0.00	0.0
Yolanda Griffith	0	0	00.0	0.0	0.0	0.00	0.00	0.0
Ebony Hoffman	0	0	00.0	0.0	0.0	0.00	0.00	0.0
Briann January	0	0	00.0	0.0	0.0	0.00	0.00	0.0
Jessica Moore	0	0	00.0	0.0	0.0	0.00	0.00	0.0
Eshaya Murphy	0	0	00.0	0.0	0.0	0.00	0.00	0.0
Tammy Sutton-Brown	0	0	00.0	0.0	0.0	0.00	0.00	0.0
Erica White	0	0	00.0	0.0	0.0	0.00	0.00	0.0
Christina Wirth	0	0	00.0	0.0	0.0	0.00	0.00	0.0
Khadijah Whittington	0	0	00.0	0.0	0.0	0.00	0.00	0.0

=== Team statistics ===
Team	FG%	3P%	FT%	RPG	APG	SPG	BPG	TO	PF	PPG
Indiana Fever	.000	.000	.000	00.0	00.0	0.0	0.0	00.0	00.0	00.0
Opponents	.000	.000	.000	00.0	00.0	0.0	0.0	00.0	00.0	00.0

== Awards and honors ==
- Tamika Catchings was named WNBA Eastern Conference Player of the Week for the week of June 22, 2009.
- Tammy Sutton-Brown was named WNBA Eastern Conference Player of the Week for the week of June 29, 2009.
- Katie Douglas was named WNBA Eastern Conference Player of the Week for the week of July 27, 2009.
- Katie Douglas was named WNBA Eastern Conference Player of the Week for the week of August 3, 2009.
- Tamika Catchings was named to the 2009 WNBA All-Star Team as an Eastern Conference starter.
- Katie Douglas was named to the 2009 WNBA All-Star Team as an Eastern Conference starter.
- Tamika Catchings was named to the All-WNBA First Team.
- Katie Douglas was named to the All-WNBA Second Team.
- Tamika Catchings was named the Defensive Player of the Year.
- Tamika Catchings was named to the All-Defensive First Team.
- Tully Bevilaqua was named to the All-Defensive First Team.
