= 2008 Indiana Fever season =

Basketball team season

- Head coach: Lin Dunn
- Arena: Conseco Fieldhouse

Results
- Record: 17–17 (.500)
- Place: 4th (Eastern)
- Playoff finish: Eliminated 2–1 by Detroit, Eastern Conference Semi-Finals

Media
- Television: FSN Indiana

The 2008 Indiana Fever season was their 9th season in the Women's National Basketball Association (WNBA). They finished 4th in the Eastern Conference with 17 wins and 17 losses on the season. The season marked the fourth consecutive season that the Fever earned a playoff berth. They were eliminated in the Eastern Conference Semi-Finals 2–1 by the Detroit Shock.

== Offseason ==
On October 26, 2007, the Fever announced that they declined the option for head coach, Brian Winters, ending his four-year tenure as head coach. On December 12, 2007, assistant coach Lin Dunn was named as the replacement for Winters.

In one of the biggest trades in WNBA history the Fever traded Tamika Whitmore and their first-round pick in the 2008 WNBA draft to the Connecticut Sun for Indianapolis native Katie Douglas on February 19, 2008.

The following player was selected in the expansion draft by the Atlanta Dream :

- Ann Strother

=== 2008 WNBA draft ===
Indiana's selections from the 2008 WNBA draft in Tampa Bay.

Round	Pick	Player	Position	Nationality	School/club team
2	26	Khadijah Whittington	Small forward	United States	N.C. State

== Transactions ==
The Fever were involved in the following transactions during the 2008 season.

=== Trades ===
Date	Player Acquired	Acquired from	For
February 19, 2008	Katie Douglas	Connecticut Sun	Tamika Whitmore, the 12th pick in the 2008 WNBA draft, and the rights to Jessica Foley
May 14, 2008	Bernadette Ngoyisa	Chicago Sky	K.B. Sharp
July 4, 2008	Kristen Mann	Atlanta Dream	Alison Bales

=== Free agents ===
==== Additions ====
Date	Player	Former team
February 22, 2008	LaToya Bond	Sacramento Monarchs
March 20, 2008	Allison Feaster	Free agent
May 22, 2008	Sherill Baker	Los Angeles Sparks
August 14, 2008	Doneeka Lewis	Seattle Storm

==== Subtractions ====
Date	Player	New team
May 22, 2008	Kasha Terry	Atlanta Dream

=== Re-signings ===
Date	Player
February 19, 2008	Tammy Sutton-Brown
February 22, 2008	Ebony Hoffman
February 28, 2008	Tamika Catchings
March 25, 2008	K.B. Sharp

== Roster ==
2008 Indiana Fever roster
Players
Coaches

Pos.	No.	Nat.	Name	Height	Weight	From
PG	35	(United States)	Baker, Sherill	5' 8" (1.73m)	125 lb (57kg)	Georgia
PG	41	(Australia)	Bevilaqua, Tully	5' 7" (1.7m)	145 lb (66kg)	Australia
PG	10	(United States)	Bond, LaToya	5' 9" (1.75m)	132 lb (60kg)	Missouri
SF	24	(United States)	Catchings, Tamika (C)	6' 2" (1.88m)	167 lb (76kg)	Tennessee
G/F	23	(United States)	Douglas, Katie	6' 0" (1.83m)	165 lb (75kg)	Purdue
G/F	21	(United States)	Feaster, Allison	5' 11" (1.8m)	168 lb (76kg)	Harvard University
PF	32	(United States)	Hoffman, Ebony	6' 2" (1.88m)	215 lb (98kg)	USC
PG	4	(United States)	Lewis, Doneeka	5' 9" (1.75m)	160 lb (73kg)	LSU
SF	44	(United States)	Mann, Kristen	6' 2" (1.88m)	185 lb (84kg)	UC Santa Barbara
C	50	(Democratic Republic of the Congo)	Ngoyisa, Bernadette	6' 4" (1.93m)	195 lb (88kg)	Democratic Republic of the Congo
C	8	(Canada)	Sutton-Brown, Tammy	6' 4" (1.93m)	200 lb (91kg)	Rutgers
PG		(United States)	White, Erica	5' 3" (1.6m)	135 lb (61kg)	LSU
SG	15	(United States)	White, Tan	5' 7" (1.7m)	154 lb (70kg)	Mississippi State
PF	1	(United States)	Whittington, Khadijah	6' 1" (1.85m)	185 lb (84kg)	NC State

Head coach
(United States) Lin Dunn (UT Martin)
Assistant coaches
(United States) Gary Kloppenburg (UC San Diego)
(United States) Jim Lewis (West Virginia)
Athletic trainer
(United States) Brandon Johnson (Purdue)
Strength and conditioning coach
(United States) Ruth Helland (Concordia (WI))

Legend

- (C) Team captain
- (DP) Unsigned draft pick
- (FA) Free agent
- (S) Suspended
- Injured

WNBA roster page

=== Depth ===
Pos.	Starter	Bench	Reserve	Inactive
C	Tammy Sutton-Brown	Bernadette Ngoyisa
PF	Ebony Hoffman	Kristen Mann	Khadijah Whittington
SF	Tamika Catchings	Allison Feaster
SG	Katie Douglas	Tan White
PG	Tully Bevilaqua	Doneeka Lewis		Sherill Baker (injured); LaToya Bond

== Season standings ==
Eastern Conference	W	L	PCT	GB	Home	Road	Conf.
Detroit Shock ^{x}	22	12	.647	–	14–3	8–9	16–4
Connecticut Sun ^{x}	21	13	.618	1.0	13–4	8–9	13–7
New York Liberty ^{x}	19	15	.559	3.0	11–6	8–9	11–9
Indiana Fever ^{x}	17	17	.500	5.0	11–6	6–11	12–8
Chicago Sky ^{o}	12	22	.353	10.0	8–9	4–13	10–10
Washington Mystics ^{o}	10	24	.294	12.0	6–11	4–13	6–14
Atlanta Dream ^{o}	4	30	.118	18.0	1–16	3–14	2–18

== Schedule ==
=== Preseason ===
2009 Game Log: Preseason

Game	Date	Opponent	Score	High points	High rebounds	High assists	Location/Attendance	Record
1	May 3	@ Chicago	L 81–71	Terry (12)	Bales (9)	Jinks (5)	Al McGuire Center; 1,134	0–1
2	May 7	Minnesota	L 78–64	White (16)	Bales (4)	White (4)	Conseco Fieldhouse; 5,196	0–2
3	May 10	@ Seattle	L 75–64	White (21)	Bales (7)	Selwyn, White (3)	KeyArena; 5,475	0–3

=== Regular season ===
2008 Game Log: Regular Season
May

Game	Date	Opponent	Score	High points	High rebounds	High assists	Location/Attendance	Record
1	May 17	Washington	W 64–53	Douglas (24)	Douglas, White (7)	White (4)	Conseco Fieldhouse; 10,533	1–0
2	May 21	@ Detroit	L 76–71	Douglas (26)	Hoffman (10)	White (6)	The Palace of Auburn Hills; 6,842	1–1
3	May 27	@ Connecticut	W 73–46	Douglas (23)	Hoffman (13)	Douglas, Hoffman (5)	Mohegan Sun Arena; 5,245	2–1
4	May 29	Los Angeles	W 82–78 (2OT)	Douglas (25)	Hoffman (11)	Bevilaqua, White (5)	Conseco Fieldhouse; 9,235	3–1
5	May 31	Detroit	L 74–65	White (14)	Hoffman (8)	Douglas (5)	Conseco Fieldhouse; 9,219	3–2

June

Game	Date	Opponent	Score	High points	High rebounds	High assists	Location/Attendance	Record
6	June 7	Houston	W 84–75	Douglas (20)	Hoffman (10)	Douglas, Hoffman (4)	Conseco Fieldhouse; 8,214	4–2
7	June 11	@ San Antonio	L 64–53	Douglas, White (13)	Hoffman (9)	Douglas (4)	AT&T Center; 6,262	4–3
8	June 13	@ Atlanta	W 76–67	White (21)	Sutton-Brown (12)	Douglas (7)	Philips Arena; 8,167	5–3
9	June 15	San Antonio	L 70–60	Douglas (17)	Hoffman (10)	Hoffman (4)	Conseco Fieldhouse; 7,412	5–4
10	June 18	New York	W 83–69	Douglas (16)	Douglas (8)	Douglas (5)	Conseco Fieldhouse; 6,333	6–4
11	June 20	@ Seattle	L 78–70	Sutton-Brown (14)	Hoffman (10)	Catchings, White (4)	KeyArena; 7,393	6–5
12	June 22	@ Los Angeles	L 77–63	Catchings (17)	Hoffman (10)	Catchings (3)	Staples Center; 9,463	6–6
13	June 24	Sacramento	W 78–73	Hoffman (23)	Hoffman (13)	Bevilaqua, Feaster, Ebony Hoffman (3)	Conseco Fieldhouse; 6,020	7–6
14	June 26	@ New York	L 102–96 (3OT)	Hoffman (26)	Sutton-Brown (15)	Bevilaqua (5)	Madison Square Garden; 7,899	7–7
15	June 28	@ Houston	L 75–61	Sutton-Brown (13)	Sutton-Brown (6)	Douglas (4)	Reliant Arena; 7,008	7–8

July

Game	Date	Opponent	Score	High points	High rebounds	High assists	Location/Attendance	Record
16	July 2	Chicago	W 74–67	Catchings (18)	Sutton-Brown (12)	Catchings, Douglas (3)	Conseco Fieldhouse; 6,196	8–8
17	July 5	Connecticut	W 81–74	Douglas, Sutton-Brown (18)	Sutton-Brown (9)	Douglas (5)	Conseco Fieldhouse; 6,329	9–8
18	July 8	@ Washington	L 50–48	Hoffman (16)	Hoffman (9)	Bevilaqua (4)	Verizon Center; 7,587	9–9
19	July 12	Chicago	W 66–57	Douglas (25)	Catchings (8)	Catchings (4)	Conseco Fieldhouse; 7,134	10–9
20	July 16	Atlanta	L 81–77	Catchings (18)	Catchings (12)	Catchings (5)	Conseco Fieldhouse; 9,303	10–10
21	July 18	Seattle	L 65–59	Sutton-Brown (12)	Sutton-Brown (7)	Bevilaqua, Bond (3)	Conseco Fieldhouse; 7,450	10–11
22	July 19	@ New York; Liberty Outdoor Classic	W 71–55	Douglas (20)	Catchings, Sutton-Brown (9)	Catchings, Douglas (4)	Arthur Ashe Stadium; 19,393	11–11
23	July 22	@ Chicago	L 68–60	Douglas, Sutton-Brown (14)	Sutton-Brown (10)	Catchings (4)	UIC Pavilion; 3,035	11–12
24	July 24	Minnesota	L 84–80	Catchings, Hoffman (17)	Sutton-Brown (9)	Catchings (9)	Conseco Fieldhouse; 6,010	11–13
25	July 26	@ Sacramento	L 70–62	Douglas (23)	Hoffman (8)	Catchings, White (4)	Arco Arena; 7,082	11–14
26	July 27	@ Phoenix	W 84–80	Catchings (25)	Hoffman (7)	Catchings (6)	US Airways Center; 7,924	12–14

August

Game	Date	Opponent	Score	High points	High rebounds	High assists	Location/Attendance	Record
Summer Olympic break
27	August 28	Connecticut	L 84–58	Bevilaqua, Sutton-Brown (9)	Hoffman (5)	White (3)	Conseco Fieldhouse; 6,435	12–15
28	August 30	Atlanta	W 87–72	Catchings (23)	Hoffman (14)	Douglas (6)	Conseco Fieldhouse; 9,280	13–15

September

Game	Date	Opponent	Score	High points	High rebounds	High assists	Location/Attendance	Record
29	September 2	@ Washington	W 79–68	Catchings (26)	Catchings (9)	Douglas (4)	Verizon Center; 7,244	14–15
30	September 5	@ Detroit	L 68–90	Catchings (20)	Catchings (10)	Bevilaqua (4)	The Palace of Auburn Hills; 9,287	14–16
31	September 8	@ Atlanta	W 81–77	White (24)	Catchings (10)	Catchings (6)	Philips Arena; 7,706	15–16
32	September 9	@ Minnesota	L 86–76	White (21)	Sutton-Brown (11)	Catchings (7)	Target Center; 6,706	15–17
33	September 11	New York	W 74–59	Sutton-Brown (16)	Catchings (8)	Douglas (5)	Conseco Fieldhouse; 7,062	16–17
34	September 14	Phoenix	W 103–89	Sutton-Brown (26)	Catchings (9)	Douglas (6)	Conseco Fieldhouse; 8,776	17–17

=== Playoffs ===
2008 Game Log: Postseason
Eastern Conference Semifinals

Game	Date	Opponent	Score	High points	High rebounds	High assists	Location/Attendance	Series
1	September 19	Detroit	L 81–72	Catchings, Hoffman (19)	Sutton-Brown (6)	Catchings (7)	Conseco Fieldhouse; 7,613	Shock lead 1–0
2	September 21	@ Detroit	W 89–82 (OT)	Catchings (27)	Hoffman (12)	Bevilaqua (5)	The Palace of Auburn Hills; 8,219	Tied 1–1
3	September 23	@ Detroit	L 80–61	Sutton-Brown (20)	Hoffman (10)	Catchings (8)	The Palace of Auburn Hills; 8,296	Shock win 2–1

== Awards, records and milestones ==
=== Awards ===
- Tully Bevilaqua was named to the WNBA All-Defensive First Team.
- Katie Douglas was named the Eastern Conference Player of the Week for games played from May 26 through June 1.
- Tamika Catchings was awarded the Dawn Staley Community Leadership Award for her work in the Indianapolis community with her Catch the Stars Foundation.
- Tamika Catchings was named to the WNBA All-Defensive First Team.
- Tammy Sutton-Brown was named the Eastern Conference Player of the Week for games played from September 8 through September 14.
- Ebony Hoffman was awarded the WNBA's Most Improved Player Award.

=== Records ===
- On September 14, 2008, the Indiana Fever set a franchise record for points in a game with 103 against the Phoenix Mercury.

=== Milestones ===
- Katie Douglas recorded her 3,000th career point July 27, 2008 against the Phoenix Mercury.

== Statistics ==
Legend
GP	Games played	GS	Games started	MPG	Minutes per game	RPG	Rebounds per game
APG	Assists per game	SPG	Steals per game	BPG	Blocks per game	PPG	Points per game
FG%	Field-goal percentage	3P%	3-point field-goal percentage	FT%	Free-throw percentage	TO	Turnovers per game
PF	Fouls per game		Team leader		League leader

=== Season ===
==== Player stats ====
Player	GP	GS	MPG	FG%	3FG%	FT%	RPG	APG	SPG	BPG	PPG
Sherill Baker	13	0	8.5	.324	.000	.735	1.7	1.2	0.7	0.1	3.8
Alison Bales	14	0	9.0	.389	.400	.778	1.6	0.1	0.4	1.0	2.6
Tully Bevilaqua	30	30	29.2	.405	.337	.607	2.3	2.2	2.0	0.1	5.8
LaToya Bond	32	1	10.2	.289	.214	.813	1.0	0.8	0.5	0.1	2.3
Tamika Catchings	25	17	27.8	.391	.432	.800	6.3	3.3	2.0	0.4	13.3
Katie Douglas	33	33	34.4	.371	.324	.799	4.1	3.2	1.6	0.3	15.6
Allison Feaster	33	0	9.1	.337	.307	1.000	0.7	0.8	0.2	0.1	2.6
Doneeka Lewis	8	0	7.0	.350	.286	.000	0.8	0.3	0.4	0.2	2.0
Ebony Hoffman	33	33	30.7	.465	.456	.829	7.8	1.8	1.4	0.8	10.4
Kristen Mann*	5	0	6.2	.250	.000	.000	0.8	0.2	0.2	0.2	0.4
Bernadette Ngoyisa	31	1	7.3	.476	.000	.719	1.7	0.2	0.2	0.2	2.7
Tammy Sutton-Brown	33	33	29.0	.495	.000	.673	6.3	0.5	0.6	1.7	11.8
Kasha Terry	2	0	12.0	.200	.000	.000	2.5	1.0	0.0	0.0	1.0
Tan White	33	22	27.1	.366	.325	.850	3.1	2.4	1.3	0.4	9.9
Khadijah Whittington	22	0	8.5	.386	.000	.529	1.5	0.3	0.4	0.5	2.0

* Statistics include games only played with Fever

==== Team stats ====
Team	FG%	3P%	FT%	RPG	APG	SPG	BPG	PPG
Indiana Fever								
Opponents								

=== Playoffs ===
The Fever clinched a playoff berth on September 9.

==== Player stats ====
Player	GP	GS	MPG	FG%	3FG%	FT%	RPG	APG	SPG	BPG	PPG
Sherill Baker	0	0	0.0	.000	.000	.000	0.0	0.0	0.0	0.0	0.0
Tully Bevilaqua	3	3	31.3	.292	.278	1.000	2.3	2.3	1.0	0.0	6.7
LaToya Bond	0	0	0.0	.000	.000	.000	0.0	0.0	0.0	0.0	0.0
Tamika Catchings	3	3	37.7	.441	.273	.933	7.7	6.0	1.0	0.7	20.3
Katie Douglas	3	3	31.0	.318	.125	.700	2.3	2.3	1.3	0.7	7.3
Allison Feaster	2	0	4.0	.500	.500	.000	0.0	0.0	0.0	0.0	0.0
Doneeka Lewis	2	0	12.5	.375	.400	.000	1.0	1.5	0.0	0.0	1.5
Ebony Hoffman	3	3	34.0	.424	.364	.667	8.3	1.7	2.0	0.7	11.3
Kristen Mann	3	0	10.0	.444	.333	.000	0.3	0.3	0.3	0.0	3.3
Bernadette Ngoyisa	1	0	2.0	.000	.000	.000	1.0	0.0	0.0	0.0	0.0
Tammy Sutton-Brown	3	3	31.0	.387	.000	.952	5.3	0.3	0.3	1.3	14.7
Tan White	3	0	14.0	.375	.250	1.000	1.0	0.7	0.7	0.0	5.3
Khadijah Whittington	3	0	8.0	.250	.000	.000	2.3	0.3	0.3	0.3	1.3

==== Team stats ====
Team	FG%	3P%	FT%	RPG	APG	SPG	BPG	PPG
Indiana Fever	.380	.292	.897	30.7	15.0	7.0	3.7	74.0
Opponents	.432	.372	.917	35.7	14.3	8.3	3.0	81.0

Statistics last updated September 24, 2008.

Preceded by 2007	Indiana Fever seasons 2008	Succeeded by 2009
