= 2007 WNBA dispersal draft =

General information
- Sport: Basketball
- Date: January 8, 2007

Overview
- League: WNBA
- Merging teams: Charlotte Sting (folded in 2007)
- First selection: Monique Currie; Chicago Sky

The Women's National Basketball Association (WNBA) held their third dispersal draft on January 8, 2007.

This dispersal draft re-assigned players from the Charlotte Sting who folded in December 2006, after the end of the 2006 WNBA season. The remaining thirteen active teams in the WNBA each selected one player from the 2006 Sting roster in the one-round draft. Teams drafted in inverse order of their 2006 regular season finish.

All Sting players were available except for unrestricted free agents, Allison Feaster and Tammy Sutton-Brown. Two players from the Sting, Tasha Butts and Summer Erb, were not selected in the dispersal draft and became free agents on January 15.

== Key ==
| Pos. | G | F | C |
| Position | Guard | Forward | Center |

| ^{+} | Denotes player who has been selected for at least one All-Star Game |

== Draft ==
The following players were drafted from the roster of the Charlotte Sting:

| Pick | Player | Position | Nationality | New team |
|---|---|---|---|---|
| 1 | Monique Currie | F | United States | Chicago Sky |
| 2 | Tangela Smith ^{+} | F/C | United States | Minnesota Lynx |
| 3 | Janel McCarville | C | United States | New York Liberty |
| 4 | Helen Darling | G | United States | San Antonio Silver Stars |
| 5 | Kelly Mazzante | G | United States | Phoenix Mercury |
| 6 | Teana Miller | C | United States | Washington Mystics |
| 7 | Tye'sha Fluker | C | United States | Seattle Storm |
| 8 | Yelena Leuchanka | C | Belarus | Houston Comets |
| 9 | Sheri Sam ^{+} | F/G | United States | Indiana Fever |
| 10 | LaToya Bond | G | United States | Sacramento Monarchs |
| 11 | No selection | — | — | Detroit Shock |
| 12 | Ayana Walker | F | United States | Los Angeles Sparks |
| 13 | No selection | — | — | Connecticut Sun |
