= Shay Murphy =

American basketball player (born 1985)

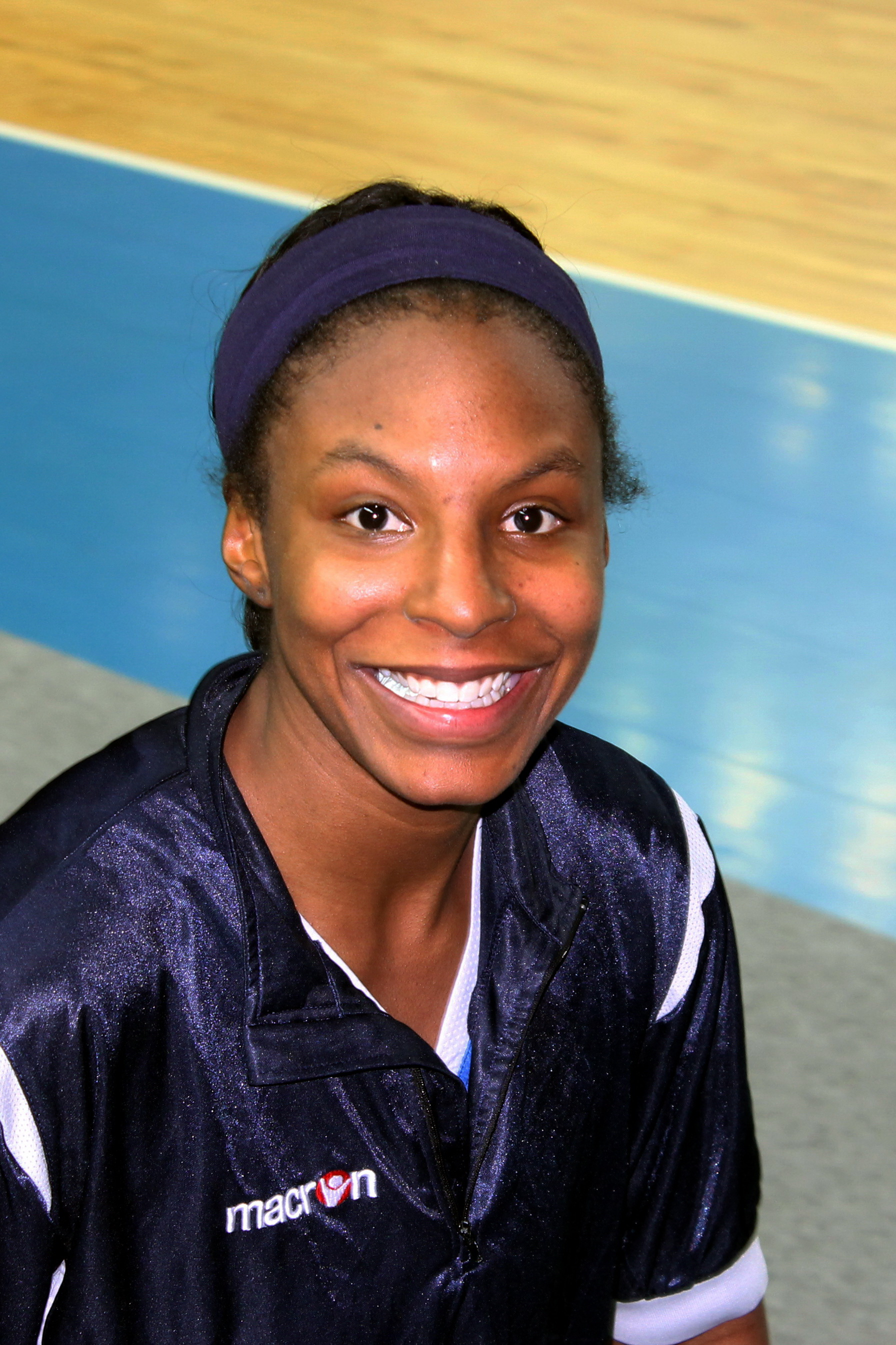

Personal information
- Born: April 15, 1985 (age 41) Canoga Park, California, U.S.
- Listed height: 5 ft 11 in (1.80 m)
- Listed weight: 164 lb (74 kg)

Career information
- High school: Montclair Prep (Van Nuys, California)
- College: USC (2003–2007)
- WNBA draft: 2007: 2nd round, 15th overall pick
- Drafted by: Minnesota Lynx
- Playing career: 2007–2023

Career history
- 2007: Minnesota Lynx
- 2008: Detroit Shock
- 2008: Washington Mystics
- 2009–2010: Indiana Fever
- 2010–2013: Chicago Sky
- 2011–2012: Ros Casares Valencia
- 2012–2013: Galatasaray
- 2013–2018: Perfumerías Avenida
- 2014: Phoenix Mercury
- 2017: Phoenix Mercury
- 2017: San Antonio Stars
- 2018–2019: Uni Girona CB

Career highlights
- WNBA champion (2014); Euroleague champion (2012); 2× All-Pac-12 (2006, 2007)
- Stats at WNBA.com
- Stats at Basketball Reference

Eshaya "Shay" Murphy (born April 15, 1985) is an American former professional basketball player.

Born in Canoga Park, California, Murphy attended college at USC and graduated in 2007. Following her collegiate career, she was selected 15th overall in the 2007 WNBA draft by the Minnesota Lynx. Murphy has a brother George who attended the same high school as her.

The rookie played a reserve role for the Lynx in 2007, averaging 5.2 points and 3.3 rebounds per game. On June 22, 2008, Murphy was traded to the Detroit Shock for LaToya Thomas. On August 12, 2008, Murphy was traded along with Tasha Humphrey to the Washington Mystics for Taj McWilliams-Franklin. After being waived by the Mystics, the Indiana Fever signed her on June 11, 2009. She then played for the Chicago Sky, being signed halfway through the 2011 season.

Murphy signed with Ros Casares Valencia of Euroleague Women for the 2011–2012 season, helping them to win the championship in her Euroleague rookie season. On season 2012–2013 she moved to Galatasaray. On 2013, she moved back to Spain signing with Perfumerias Avenida. In 2014, she signed with the Phoenix Mercury and won a WNBA championship with the team. In 2017, the Mercury would re-acquire Murphy in free agency. During the 2017 season, Murphy was traded to the San Antonio Stars.

== WNBA career statistics ==
Legend
GP	Games played	GS	Games started	MPG	Minutes per game	RPG	Rebounds per game
APG	Assists per game	SPG	Steals per game	BPG	Blocks per game	PPG	Points per game
TO	Turnovers per game	FG%	Field-goal percentage	3P%	3-point field-goal percentage	FT%	Free-throw percentage
**Bold**	Career best	°	League leader

†	Denotes seasons in which Murphy won a WNBA championship

=== Regular season ===
Year	Team	GP	GS	MPG	FG%	3P%	FT%	RPG	APG	SPG	BPG	TO	PPG
2007	Minnesota	32	0	13.6	.372	.273	.848	3.3	0.5	0.6	0.3	0.6	5.2
2008	Minnesota	2	0	2.5	.200	.000	.000	1.0	0.0	0.0	0.0	0.0	1.0
2008	Detroit	13	**3**	9.4	.300	.263	.667	1.6	0.5	0.5	0.2	0.7	2.5
2008	Washington	2	0	5.5	.333	.000	.000	1.5	0.5	0.0	0.0	1.0	1.0
2009	Indiana	24	0	7.8	.382	.344	.808	1.8	0.4	0.3	0.1	0.4	4.2
2010	Indiana	15	1	14.7	.350	.263	.571	4.1	**1.5**	0.5	0.1	1.2	5.1
2010	Chicago	11	0	14.1	.288	.286	.667	1.8	0.8	0.8	0.0	1.0	5.1
2011	Chicago	10	0	**20.5**	.369	.400	**.929**	**4.8**	1.1	**1.3**	**0.4**	1.9	**9.8**
2012	Chicago	29	**3**	18.6	.420	.441	.730	2.9	0.9	1.1	0.2	1.0	8.5
2013	Chicago	**34**	0	11.1	.292	.172	.792	1.9	0.3	0.6	0.0	0.4	3.1
2014^{†}	Phoenix	27	1	12.1	**.424**	.323	.750	1.7	1.1	0.7	0.1	0.3	3.9
2017	Phoenix	9	0	14.1	.333	.188	.667	2.4	0.8	0.7	0.0	0.6	3.2
2017	San Antonio	17	0	7.4	.400	**.450**	.667	0.9	0.6	0.2	0.1	0.4	2.2
Career	9 years, 7 teams	225	8	12.6	.366	.321	.762	2.4	0.7	0.6	0.1	0.7	4.7

=== Regular season ===
Year	Team	GP	GS	MPG	FG%	3P%	FT%	RPG	APG	SPG	BPG	TO	PPG
2009	Indiana	4	0	2.3	.000	.000	.000	0.5	0.3	0.0	0.0	0.0	0.0
2013	Chicago	2	0	**8.0**	**.500**	**1.000**	.000	**1.5**	**0.5**	0.0	0.0	0.0	**1.5**
2014^{†}	Phoenix	**7**	0	7.3	.273	.250	.000	1.4	0.4	**0.3**	0.0	0.6	1.0
Career	3 years, 3 teams	13	0	5.8	.222	.286	.000	1.2	0.4	0.2	0.0	0.3	0.8

== USC statistics ==
Legend
GP	Games played	GS	Games started	MPG	Minutes per game
FG%	Field goal percentage	3P%	3-point field goal percentage	FT%	Free throw percentage
RPG	Rebounds per game	APG	Assists per game	SPG	Steals per game
BPG	Blocks per game	PPG	Points per game	**Bold**	Career high

Year	Team	GP	Points	FG%	3P%	FT%	RPG	APG	SPG	BPG	PPG
2003–04	USC	27	154	33.3	25.4	71.1	2.9	0.7	1.6	0.1	5.7
2004–05	USC	**31**	256	36.6	25.7	68.9	5.4	1.6	1.7	0.2	8.3
2005–06	USC	**31**	**546**	**42.5**	**34.0**	78.5	7.3	1.6	**2.4**	0.3	17.6
2006–07	USC	30	536	36.4	31.2	**85.8**	**8.4**	**2.4**	2.1	**0.5**	**17.9**
Career	USC	119	1492	38.2	30.6	78.8	6.1	1.6	2.0	0.3	12.5
