= Khadijah Whittington =

American basketball player (born 1986)

No. 15 – CSM Satu Mare
- Position: Small forward

Personal information
- Born: August 5, 1986 (age 40) Roanoke, Virginia, U.S.
- Listed height: 6 ft 1 in (1.85 m)
- Listed weight: 185 lb (84 kg)

Career information
- High school: Woodrow Wilson (Portsmouth, Virginia)
- College: NC State (2004–2008)
- WNBA draft: 2008: 2nd round, 26th overall pick
- Drafted by: Indiana Fever

Career history
- 2008–2009: Indiana Fever
- 2016–present: CSM Satu Mare

Career highlights
- First-team All-ACC (2008); ACC All-Defensive Team (2008); ACC All-Freshman Team (2005)
- Stats at Basketball Reference

Khadijah Ameenah Whittington (born August 5, 1986) is an American professional basketball player for the CSM Satu Mare of the Liga Națională. After graduating from Woodrow Wilson High School (where she was a teammate of T. J. Jordan), Whittington attended North Carolina State University where she became the fourth player in school history to score 1,000 points and grab 1,000 rebounds in her career. She was selected by Indiana in the second round (26th pick overall) of the 2008 WNBA draft. Her hometown is Roanoke, Virginia.

She played for Montpellier in France during the 2008–09 WNBA off-season.

== Career statistics ==
Legend
GP	Games played	GS	Games started	MPG	Minutes per game	RPG	Rebounds per game
APG	Assists per game	SPG	Steals per game	BPG	Blocks per game	PPG	Points per game
TO	Turnovers per game	FG%	Field-goal percentage	3P%	3-point field-goal percentage	FT%	Free-throw percentage
**Bold**	Career best	°	League leader

=== WNBA ===
==== Regular season ====
Year	Team	GP	GS	MPG	FG%	3P%	FT%	RPG	APG	SPG	BPG	TO	PPG
2008	Indiana	**22**	0	**8.5**	38.6	0.0	**52.9**	1.5	0.3	**0.4**	**0.5**	0.5	2.0
2009	Indiana	3	0	8.3	**60.0**	0.0	0.0	**1.7**	**0.7**	0.0	0.0	**0.0**	**4.0**
Career	2 years, 1 team	25	0	8.4	42.6	0.0	52.9	1.6	0.3	0.4	0.4	0.5	2.2

==== Playoffs ====
Year	Team	GP	GS	MPG	FG%	3P%	FT%	RPG	APG	SPG	BPG	TO	PPG
2008	Indiana	3	0	8.0	25.0	0.0	0.0	2.3	0.3	0.3	0.3	1.0	1.3
Career	1 year, 1 team	3	0	8.0	25.0	0.0	0.0	2.3	0.3	0.3	0.3	1.0	1.3

=== College ===
Legend
GP	Games played	GS	Games started	MPG	Minutes per game
FG%	Field goal percentage	3P%	3-point field goal percentage	FT%	Free throw percentage
RPG	Rebounds per game	APG	Assists per game	SPG	Steals per game
BPG	Blocks per game	PPG	Points per game	**Bold**	Career high

Year	Team	GP	Points	FG%	3P%	FT%	RPG	APG	SPG	BPG	PPG
2004-05	North Carolina State	29	244	41.9	-	62.6	5.2	1.1	1.3	0.5	8.4
2005-06	North Carolina State	31	310	43.9	-	55.2	8.0	1.0	1.8	1.0	10.0
2006-07	North Carolina State	**35**	368	42.4	-	**64.5**	10.5	1.2	1.8	1.4	10.5
2007-08	North Carolina State	34	**571**	**49.6**	-	59.6	**11.7**	**1.4**	**2.4**	**1.7**	**16.8**
Career	North Carolina State	129	1493	45.2	0.0	60.4	9.0	1.2	1.8	1.2	11.6
