= Ebony Hoffman =

American basketball player (born 1982)

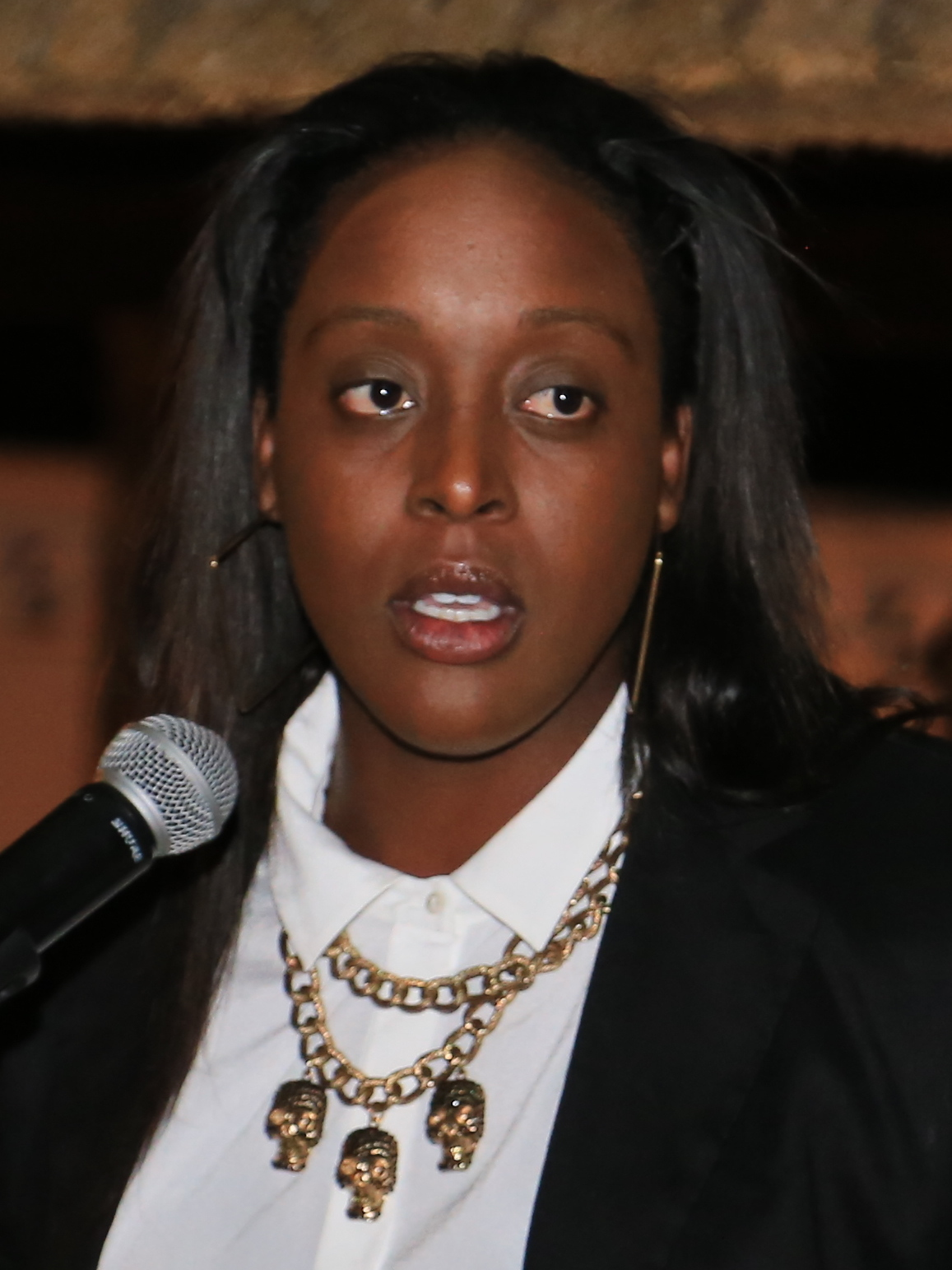
- Hoffman in 2015

Los Angeles Sparks
- Position: Assistant coach
- League: WNBA

Personal information
- Born: August 27, 1982 (age 44) Los Angeles, California, U.S.
- Listed height: 6 ft 2 in (1.88 m)
- Listed weight: 215 lb (98 kg)

Career information
- High school: Narbonne (Harbor City, California)
- College: USC (2000–2004)
- WNBA draft: 2004: 1st round, 9th overall pick
- Drafted by: Indiana Fever
- Playing career: 2004–2019
- Coaching career: 2022–present

Career history

Playing
- 2004–2010: Indiana Fever
- 2011–2013: Los Angeles Sparks
- 2014: Connecticut Sun

Coaching
- 2022–2025: Seattle Storm (assistant)
- 2026–present: Los Angeles Sparks (assistant)

Career highlights
- WNBA Most Improved Player Award (2008); 3× All Pac-10 (2002–2004); Pac-10 All-Freshman Team (2001)
- Stats at WNBA.com
- Stats at Basketball Reference
Medals
Women's basketball
Representing United States
FIBA Under-18 Americas Championship
Gold medal – first place	2000 Argentina	Team

Ebony Vernice Hoffman (born August 27, 1982) is an American former professional basketball player and a current assistant coach for the Los Angeles Sparks of the WNBA. She played and won the EuroLeague Women's championship with Fenerbahce Istanbul in Turkey. She also played for Polisportiva Ares Ribera in Italy, Besiktas in Turkey, TEO Vilnius in Lithuania, and Ramat Hasharon in Israel.

== Personal life ==
According to a DNA analysis, she descended, mainly, of people from Sierra Leone.

== High school ==
Hoffman played for Narbonne High School in Harbor City, California, where she was named a WBCA All-American. She participated in the 2000 WBCA High School All-America Game where she scored nine points.

== College and professional ==
She was selected by the Indiana Fever as the ninth overall pick in the 2004 WNBA draft. She attended the University of Southern California (USC).

In 2008, Hoffman was selected as the WNBA's Most Improved Player.

== Career statistics ==
Legend
GP	Games played	GS	Games started	MPG	Minutes per game	RPG	Rebounds per game
APG	Assists per game	SPG	Steals per game	BPG	Blocks per game	PPG	Points per game
TO	Turnovers per game	FG%	Field-goal percentage	3P%	3-point field-goal percentage	FT%	Free-throw percentage
**Bold**	Career best	°	League leader

=== WNBA career statistics ===
==== Regular season ====
Year	Team	GP	GS	MPG	FG%	3P%	FT%	RPG	APG	SPG	BPG	TO	PPG
2004	Indiana	30	13	11.1	31.3	29.4	75.0	2.9	0.7	0.5	0.2	0.9	2.0
2005	Indiana	33	0	15.1	40.5	**50.0**	83.3	2.9	0.5	0.6	0.3	**0.7**	3.6
2006	Indiana	**34**	33	25.1	39.4	0.0	77.1	5.7	1.4	1.1	0.5	2.1	6.4
2007	Indiana	**34**	10	17.1	44.5	40.0	82.4	4.0	0.8	0.6	0.5	1.2	4.2
2008	Indiana	33	33	**30.7**	**46.5**	45.6	82.9	**7.8**	**1.8**	1.4	**0.8**	2.4	**10.4**
2009	Indiana	**34**	**34**	29.6	39.0	34.7	**89.6**	5.9	1.5	**1.7**	0.4	2.4	9.9
2010	Indiana	**34**	33	24.0	39.7	31.7	85.0	4.2	1.3	1.2	0.4	1.6	8.0
2011	Los Angeles	**34**	16	22.1	43.7	42.9	84.4	4.2	1.1	1.1	0.3	1.5	7.5
2012	Los Angeles	20	0	10.4	34.6	26.3	80.0	2.1	0.5	0.7	0.1	**0.7**	2.5
2013	Los Angeles	33	0	12.5	42.6	7.1	88.9	1.9	1.0	0.5	0.3	**0.7**	3.1
2014	Connecticut	8	0	8.5	33.3	0.0	0.0	1.8	0.5	0.6	0.0	0.8	1.5
Career	11 years, 3 teams	327	172	20.0	41.1	34.5	83.6	4.2	1.1	0.9	0.4	1.4	5.8

==== Playoffs ====
Year	Team	GP	GS	MPG	FG%	3P%	FT%	RPG	APG	SPG	BPG	TO	PPG
2006	Indiana	2	2	26.0	**66.7**	0.0	0.0	3.0	0.5	1.5	**2.0**	1.5	6.0
2007	Indiana	4	0	10.5	41.7	0.0	0.0	2.3	0.3	0.0	0.3	**0.5**	2.5
2008	Indiana	3	3	**34.0**	42.4	36.4	66.7	**8.3**	**1.7**	**2.0**	0.7	1.0	11.3
2009	Indiana	**10**	**10**	29.5	55.3	**40.0**	86.4	4.8	0.8	1.1	0.5	1.8	**11.9**
2010	Indiana	3	3	29.7	33.3	33.3	**87.5**	4.7	1.3	1.0	1.0	1.0	11.0
2012	Los Angeles	2	0	5.0	0.0	0.0	0.0	0.5	0.0	0.0	0.0	**0.5**	0.0
2013	Los Angeles	1	0	3.0	0.0	0.0	0.0	0.0	0.0	0.0	0.0	1.0	0.0
Career	7 years, 2 teams	25	18	23.7	48.0	35.3	73.7	4.1	0.8	0.9	0.6	1.2	8.3

=== College career statistics ===
Legend
GP	Games played	GS	Games started	MPG	Minutes per game
FG%	Field goal percentage	3P%	3-point field goal percentage	FT%	Free throw percentage
RPG	Rebounds per game	APG	Assists per game	SPG	Steals per game
BPG	Blocks per game	PPG	Points per game	**Bold**	Career high

Year	Team	GP	Points	FG%	3P%	FT%	RPG	APG	SPG	BPG	PPG
2000–01	USC	28	350	44.9	21.4	75.8	8.0	2.1	1.6	0.9	12.5
2001–02	USC	28	416	45.2	31.8	75.7	8.9	1.6	2.4	**1.3**	14.9
2002–03	USC	**31**	**504**	**46.1**	41.1	**76.0**	**9.8**	**2.3**	**2.5**	1.1	**16.3**
2003–04	USC	28	417	43.4	**37.3**	68.8	8.1	1.9	2.1	1.0	14.9
Career	USC	115	1687	44.9	35.8	74.0	8.7	2.0	2.2	1.1	14.7

== USA Basketball ==
Hoffman was a member of the USA Women's U18 team which won the gold medal at the FIBA Americas Championship in Mar Del Plata, Argentina. The event was held in July 2000, when the USA team defeated Cuba to win the championship. Hoffman helped the team win all five games, scoring 6.8 points per game.

Hoffman was invited to the USA Basketball Women's National Team training camp in the fall of 2009. The team selected to play for the 2010 FIBA World Championship and the 2012 Olympics is usually chosen from these participants. At the conclusion of the training camp, the team will travel to Ekaterinburg, Russia, where they compete in the 2009 UMMC Ekaterinburg International Invitational.

== In popular culture ==
Hoffman appears as herself on season 3, episode 3 of the IFC television series Comedy Bang Bang!.

== Notes ==
- Offseason 2008–09: Overseas Roster
