= Lindsay Taylor =

American basketball player (born 1981)

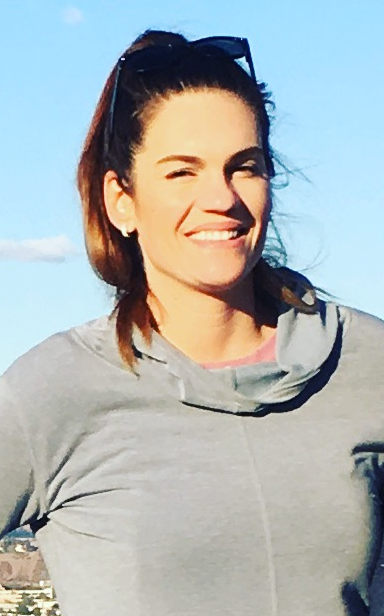
- Taylor in 2019

Personal information
- Born: May 20, 1981 (age 45) Poway, California, U.S.
- Listed height: 6 ft 8 in (2.03 m)
- Listed weight: 200 lb (91 kg)

Career information
- High school: Chandler (Chandler, Arizona)
- College: UC Santa Barbara (1999–2004)
- WNBA draft: 2004: 2nd round, 26th overall pick
- Drafted by: Houston Comets
- Playing career: 2004–2015
- Position: Center
- Number: 13, 44, 33, 20, 81
- Coaching career: 2015–present

Career history

Playing
- 2004–2005: (United States) Phoenix Mercury
- 2005–2006: (Turkey) Botașspor Adana
- 2006: (South Korea) Shinsegae Cool Cats
- 2006–2007: (France) Lattes-Maurin Montpellier
- 2007: (Turkey) Botașspor Adana
- 2007–2008: (Poland) Energa Katarzynki Toruń
- 2008–2009: (Poland) KSSSE AZS PWSZ Gorzów Wielkopolski
- 2009–2010: (France) Nantes-Rezé
- 2010–2011: (China) Qujing Yunnan
- 2011: (France) Nantes-Rezé
- 2011–2012: (China) Qujing Yunnan
- 2013–2014: (China) Qujing Yunnan
- 2014–2015: (South Korea) Guri KDB Life Winnus
- 2015: (Angola) Primeiro de Agosto

Career highlights
- Big West Player of the Year (2003); 2× First-team All-Big West (2003, 2004); 3× Big West tournament MVP (2001–2004); Big West Freshman of the Year (2001); Big West All-Freshman Team (2001); All-time leading scorer, leader in blocks and field goal percentage in UC Santa Barbara history
- Stats at Basketball Reference
Medals
Women's basketball
Representing United States
Pan American Games
Silver medal – second place	2003 Santo Domingo	Team

Lindsay Corine Taylor (born May 20, 1981) is an American former professional basketball player. She played in the WNBA, KBSL, LFB, WKBL, Polish Women's League, WCBA, and Angola Women's Basketball League, usually playing the center position. An experienced player, Taylor has played professionally overseas in Europe, Asia, and Africa in 13 basketball seasons between 2005 and 2015.

Taylor attended Chandler High School and was a Chandler HS state champion in 1999. She attended University of California, Santa Barbara between 1999 and 2004 and was the 2001 Big West Freshman and Player of the Year. Taylor is Santa Barbara's all-time leading point scorer, blocker and most accurate shooter.

As a member of the United States 2003 Pan American Games basketball team Taylor was awarded the Silver Medal and was considered the best player on the team. She was instrumental in securing the Gauchos four straight Big West Conference women's Championships victories between 2001–2004, and almost single-handedly took the team to the 2004 Sweet Sixteen – the furthest the team had ever advanced in the NCAA tournament. In April 2014, she was elected to UC Santa Barbara Hall of Fame.

Graduating from Santa Barbara in 2004, she was one of the highly regarded rookies for the 2004 WNBA draft and was chosen by the Houston Comets and later traded to the Phoenix Mercury. She was the second-round (26th pick overall) in the 2004 WNBA Draft. In total Taylor signed with four WNBA teams between 2004 and 2008: the Houston Comets, Phoenix Mercury, Seattle Storm (twice) and the Washington Mystics.

Between 2005 and 2015 Taylor had a decorated career playing overseas in Europe, Africa and Asia, having especially successful stints in both the Women's Chinese Basketball Association (WCBA). and the Polish Women's League. Taylor finished her first season in the Polish Women's League with the highest number of scored points, and the highest overall evaluation in league history. She was also awarded Center of the Year and earned a place on the 1st Team, All-Imports Team and the All-Defensive Team. In 2011 Taylor received the All-Chinese WCBA 1st Team award.

Taylor retired from professional basketball in 2015. She serves as an assistant basketball coach at Hamilton High School. She is currently in her sixth season with Hamilton.

== Early life ==
Lindsay Corine Taylor was born on May 20, 1981, in Poway, California, the daughter of Catherine and Bill Taylor. Her family later moved to Phoenix, Arizona. Taylor came from a family of above-average height and claims she inherited her great height from her father who is 6 ft 11 in (2.11 m). Her uncle, Ron (died November 2019), stood 7 ft 0 in (2.13 m) and was nicknamed "Tiny". She has an older sister, Roz, and a younger brother who unlike Lindsay, are just a little above average height. Her grandmother, Helen Taylor (died September 2006), regularly wrote articles on the internet about Lindsay during her time playing for the UCSB Gauchos.

Taylor was not involved in sports until she was fifteen. She had originally planned on playing in her school's marching band, but her closest friends, who played basketball, convinced her to start playing the game. She said she "picked it up naturally". She said that if it were not for basketball, her desires might have led her to a different career.

== High school career ==
Taylor attended Chandler High School in Chandler, Arizona. In her first high school basketball game, she accidentally scored for the opposite team.

She helped lead her team to two regional championships, and as a senior, she helped lead them to the Arizona State Championship. She averaged 19.2 points, 11.0 rebounds and 3.1 blocks in her final year as a prepster. During a game in her junior year, she scored a career-best 31 points and grabbed 21 rebounds. She played for the AAU Arizona Elite, where she guided the team to the 17-Gold National Championship in 1998 at the age of 17. She became a Chandler HS state champion in 1999.

== College career ==
Taylor later became famous during her NCAA career at UC Santa Barbara, playing center for the women's basketball team. She was (and still is) the tallest women's basketball player in the school's history, and she attended the same classes as fellow WNBA players Kayte Christensen and Kristen Mann.

After initially redshirting her first year (1999–2000) Taylor played center for the women's basketball team UC Santa Barbara Gaucho. In 2000–01, Taylor capped an impressive rookie season by earning the 2001 Big West Freshman of the Year award, second team all-conference and All-Big West tournament honors. She was twice named Big West's Player of the Week: January 15 and January 29. Taylor scored 20 or more points three times, with her career high of 24 coming against Boise State on January 21, 2001. Her field goal percentage in Big West Play of 65.0% was the highest percentage in the conference, and she later had 17 double-digit performances, including nine of her last 11 games and 13 of her final 16. It was during her second season at Santa Barbara that Taylor grew her final inch, something she was unaware of until she was measured later on, reaching her full and trademark height of 6 ft 8 inches. She was also selected as Big West Freshman of the Year.

In 2001–02, she earned her second Big West All Conference Honors. She missed two games – vs. Northridge (Jan. 6, 2002) and Fullerton (Feb. 6, 2002) because of soreness in her lower back. Her third season (2002–03) was capped by an honorable mention Associated Press All-American recognition, Big West Player of the Year honors and her second consecutive conference tournament MVP award. She also delivered 28 consecutive free-throws during her 2002–03 campaign.

During Taylor's senior year (2003–04), her UCSB Gaucho squad received their 8th consecutive Big West Conference Title with a 27–7 record and won the Big West tournament, in which Taylor won her third consecutive MVP award. The Gauchos upset Colorado and Houston to get to the NCAA Sweet 16 until losing to defending champion Connecticut, which had fellow WNBA teammate Diana Taurasi. She notched her 1,000th point as a Gaucho at Illinois on February 13, 2003, and moved her score into 13th place on UCSB's career scoring list. She only needed 500 points to break the school's highest-ever career scoring record, held by Kristi Rohr.

On November 20, 2003, Taylor scored a team-high of 12 points. She was the only Gaucho player to be in double-figures and the only visiting player to make half her field goal tries, sinking four out of eight.

On November 25, 2003, she scored a game-high of 23 points and became UCSB's record holder in career blocked shots and the school's all-time leader in career blocked shots with 181 points. On November 28, she scored a game-high 20 points as the Gauchos won. Taylor scored seven of her 20 points during the 19–4 second half run and extended the then nation's second longest home winning streak to 27 straight games. Later on December 16 she led all Gaucho players with a game high 23 points, grabbed a career-high 16 rebounds and also matching her personal best of six blocked shots. On December 28 Taylor finished with 14 points and 11 rebounds for her third consecutive double-double and 19th of her collegiate career.

Taylor said one of her biggest developments in college was to build her strength up. Despite pulling down 7.3 rebounds per game, she counted rebounding as a weakness of hers and would continue to work hard on it to improve.

Taylor graduated from Santa Barbara in 2004. Her collegiate career held many distinctions at the time, such as the all-time leader in points: 1,755, most blocked shots: 242, and field goal percentage: 55.8%, in UC Santa Barbara history. Taylor has been Santa Barbara's all-time leading point scorer, blocker and most accurate shooter.

In April 2014, she was elected to UC Santa Barbara Hall of Fame.

=== UCSB statistics ===
Legend
GP	Games played	GS	Games started	MPG	Minutes per game
FG%	Field goal percentage	3P%	3-point field goal percentage	FT%	Free throw percentage
RPG	Rebounds per game	APG	Assists per game	SPG	Steals per game
BPG	Blocks per game	PPG	Points per game	**Bold**	Career high

Year	Team	GP	Points	FG%	3P%	FT%	RPG	APG	SPG	BPG	PPG
2000–01	UCSB	31	329	55.6	0.0	75.8	6.0	0.5	0.5	1.6	10.6
2001–02	UCSB	29	371	55.0	50.0	**78.5**	7.0	0.6	**1.0**	**2.4**	12.8
2002–03	UCSB	32	521	**56.8**	**70.0**	73.1	**7.5**	0.8	0.6	1.8	**16.3**
2003–04	UCSB	**34**	**546**	55.8	26.3	71.2	7.3	**1.3**	0.6	2.0	16.1
Career	UCSB	126	1767	55.9	40.5	74.5	7.0	0.8	0.7	1.9	14.0

== WNBA career ==
=== First season (2004–2005) ===
Taylor was one of the highly regarded rookies for the 2004 WNBA draft. At age 22 she was chosen by the Houston Comets. She was subsequently traded to Phoenix Mercury alongside the higher-regarded Diana Taurasi. She was a second-round pick (26th overall) in the 2004 WNBA Draft.

Her first game was against the Seattle Storm, on May 8, 2004. Prior to the game, Taylor was told "there was a chance" she'd see some action. She got a rousing ovation when she came off the bench for a few minutes in the first half. Her family also attended the game, and were right there to watch her get her first taste of pro competition. She attempted one field goal, which she missed. On May 10, the Mercury played the Sacramento Monarchs. She attempted rebounds against Chantelle Anderson and Maren Walseth. Taylor was injured later on. Despite the injury she recovered enough to play against the Sacramento Monarchs on June 27 when she performed a career-high. Eighteen minutes into the game she grabbed two rebounds and scored three points on a 3-point basket late in the game and blocked four shots in 17 minutes. The game ended, 83–44, a Phoenix victory.

Taylor remained on the injured list for the rest of the season, but was expected to return later in her inaugural WNBA season. In total, she would appear in just five games and miss over twenty other matches during the 2004 season, seeing limited action in those games before being waived at the end of 2005 training camp.

=== Second season (2006) ===
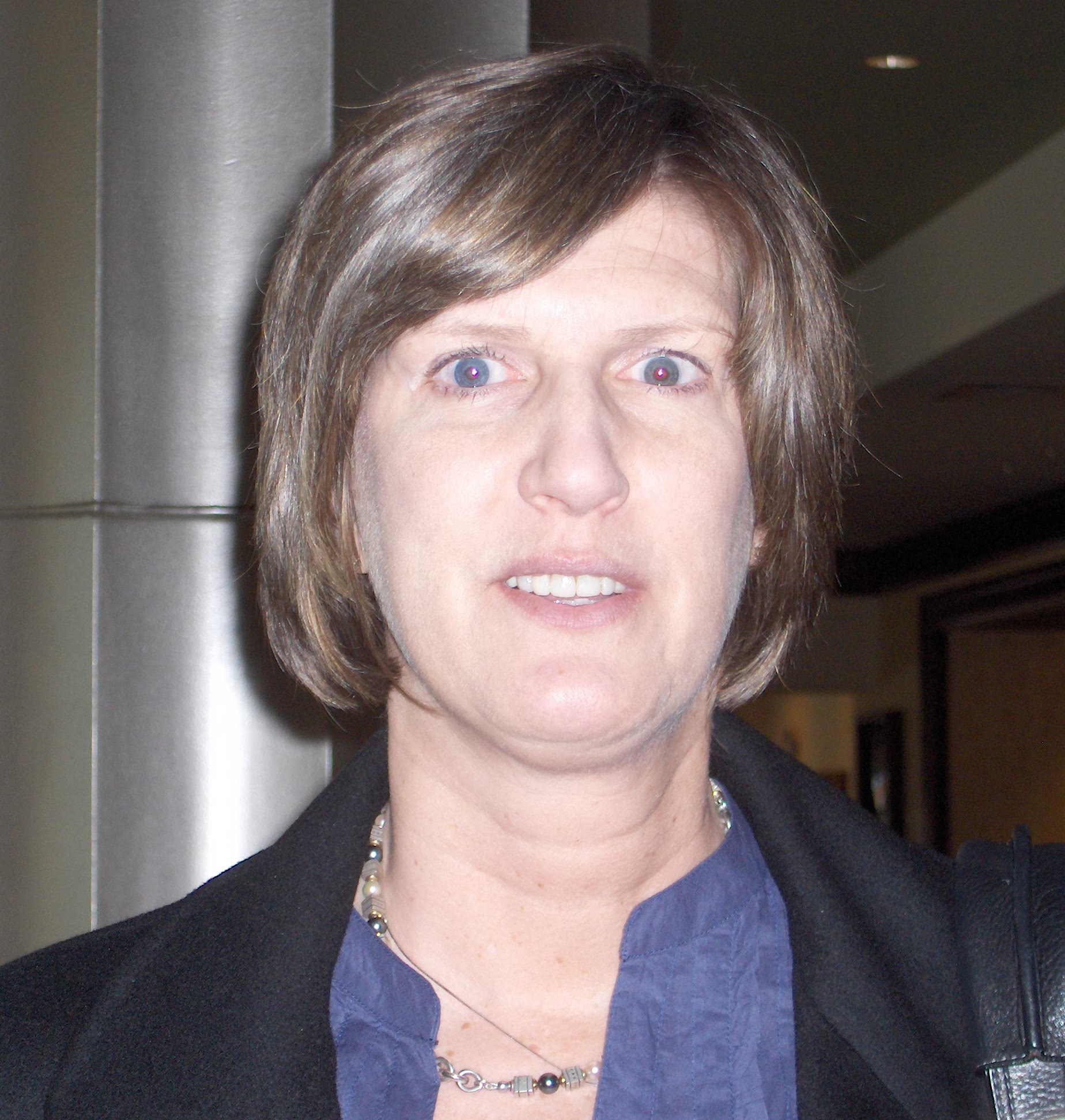
Anne Donovan was Seattle Storm coach during Taylor's stint. Donovan spoke highly of Taylor and said of her: "What I saw there was some potential."

On April 13, 2006, the Seattle Storm signed Taylor to a training camp contract. Upon joining her new team she immediately became the team's tallest player, adding an extra three inches over then-tallest teammate Lauren Jackson. Taylor also holds the distinction of being the only player on the Storm team as tall as then-head coach Anne Donovan, who, also at 6 feet 8 inches, a fact acknowledged by Donovan when the two allegedly stood eye-to-eye and she remarked about Taylor, "She is legit."

Donovan praised Taylor's skills and favorably compared her to fellow WNBA player Kara Wolters, whom Donovan had personally tutored. Taylor spoke enthusiastically about joining her new team and what it could mean for her and improving her abilities. She expressed admiration for Lauren Jackson, said she could learn from her, and Taylor also looked forward to the training she could expect to receive from Donovan.

Despite Donovan's praise, however, on May 17 Taylor was released by the Storm, just a little over a month after she signed. She was the team's last cut before rosters were finalized. An Achilles tendinitis in her right ankle had prevented Taylor from taking full advantage of her invitation to training camp. In all, she only played in only two preseason games, one on May 7 and the other on the 12th, five days before her release, averaging 7.0 points and 3.5 rebounds on a 3-point basket late in the game. She missed an exhibition finale against the Minnesota Lynx and spent several other games on the injured list because of her tendinitis in her foot.

=== Third season (2008) ===
During her time in the Polish Women's League, Taylor expressed her desire to return and compete in the WNBA, and on April 17, 2008, she signed a training camp contract with the Washington Mystics Taylor's selection on the team was considered unusual for a team noted for its average-sized post players and fast-paced style of play and gave the Mystics a completely different look. She began attending training camp for the Washington Mystics soon afterwards on April 20 at Trinity University in Washington D.C.

During her training camp trials, Taylor competed in three pre-season games. The first game, played in Tampa, Florida, against the Sacramento Monarchs, ended in a victory for the Washington Mystics with a score of 90–82. The second game was another Washington victory played in New York against New York Liberty ending 58–52. She enjoyed further victory against the Houston Comets with a 72–66 victory.

The Mystics officially announced that Taylor had successfully secured a place on the Washington Mystics roster on May 14 and she would be spending the upcoming summer playing on the team. She did not compete in the Mystics' season opener against the Indiana Fever. Her absence was noted in the game as it was the only loss suffered by the Mystics. On May 21 Mystics' manager Linda Hargrove announced the team would waive Taylor in exchange for the higher-regarded Crystal Smith, despite Smith still recovering from a foot injury at the time. Her release coincided with her fellow UC Santa Barbara graduate and friend Kayte Christensen's release from the Chicago Sky. On May 28, 2008, Taylor and her father Bill were special guests of the Mystics for the Washington vs Phoenix Mercury game in Phoenix, Arizona.

=== WNBA career statistics ===
Legend
GP	Games played	GS	Games started	MPG	Minutes per game	RPG	Rebounds per game
APG	Assists per game	SPG	Steals per game	BPG	Blocks per game	PPG	Points per game
TO	Turnovers per game	FG%	Field-goal percentage	3P%	3-point field-goal percentage	FT%	Free-throw percentage
**Bold**	Career best	°	League leader

==== Regular season ====
Year	Team	GP	GS	MPG	FG%	3P%	FT%	RPG	APG	SPG	BPG	TO	PPG
2004	Phoenix	5	0	5.2	20.0	33.3	0.0	0.6	0.4	0.2	0.2	0.2	0.6
Career	1 year, 1 teams	5	0	5.2	20.0	33.3	0.0	0.6	0.4	0.2	0.2	0.2	0.6

== International career ==
Taylor played basketball in numerous countries. She enjoyed great success playing overseas in Europe and Asia, especially in the Women's Chinese Basketball Association (WCBA). and the Polish Women's League, where she was known by the sobriquet Lindska (Note: Used by Polish fans) and achieved a level of recognition comparable to that of Lisa Leslie in the WNBA, Taylor won a silver medal as a member of the United States 2003 Pan American Games basketball team with fellow Guacho, Kristen Mann when they played off in the Dominican Republic against the home team. She was considered the best player in the game and her finest effort in the tournament was six-point, four-rebound performance in quarterfinal victory over their hosts the Dominicans.

Seasons	League	Team	Country
2005–2006	Turkish Women's Basketball League,	Botașspor Adana (1st time)	(Turkey)
2006	Women's Korean Basketball League	Shinsegae Cool Cats	(South Korea)
2006–2007	Ligue Féminine de Basketball	Lattes-Maurin Montpellier	(France)
2007	Turkish Women's Basketball League	Botașspor Adana (2nd time)	(Turkey)
2007–2008	Polish Women's League	Energa Katarzynki Toruń	(Poland)
2008–2009	Polish Women's League	KSSSE AZS PWSZ Gorzów Wielkopolski	(Poland)
2009–2010	Ligue Féminine de Basketball	Nantes Rezé (1st time)	(France)
2010–2011	Women's Chinese Basketball Association	Qujing Great Wall (1st time)	(China)
2011	Ligue Féminine de Basketball	Nantes-Rezé (2nd time)	(France)
2011–2012	Women's Chinese Basketball Association	Qujing Great Wall (2nd time)	(China)
2013–2014	Women's Chinese Basketball Association,	Qujing Yunnan	(China)
2014–2015	Women's Korean Basketball League	Guri KDB Life Winnus	(South Korea)
2015	Angolan Women's Basketball League	Primeiro de Agosto	(Angola)

=== Turkey (2005–2006) ===
Taylor spent the WNBA 2005–06 offseason in Turkey, where she averaged 16.5 points and 10.3 rebounds per game for her new team, the Botașspor Adana (or Botaș as it was known for short). On February 8, 2006, Taylor and her team beat the Burhaniye, at home. She did not score in the first half, but she later scored 15 points in the second half. She ended up with 16 rebounds altogether. On February 18 Taylor and her team lost to Ceyhan with the scores 90–70. However, later on March 12, Botaș beat their rivals, Mersin, 81–71, in their home town. Taylor had a solid double during the game with 22 points and 12 rebounds. On April 1, she had 20 points and 12 rebounds as Botaș won, 83–59, over their opponent, the Erdemir Spor.

=== Korea and France (2006–2007) ===
On May 31, 2006, Taylor travelled to South Korea for two months, where she played in the Korean women's league. She played for the Shinsegae Cool Cats. On July 5, Taylor scraped her team out of last place in the league and into a position to make the post season play-offs but did not qualify to make it to the playoffs.

On September 17, 2006, Taylor had successful heel surgery performed on both her heels. She then recuperated and flew off to Montpellier, France where she played for the Lattes-Maurin Montpellier.

=== Turkey (2007) ===
In January 2007, Taylor resumed playing in Turkey and rejoined Botașspor Adana. The following month Taylor's team beat Galatasaray in its home gym in Istanbul, and which included four WNBA players: Loree Moore, Nikki Teasley, Tangela Smith and Chantelle Anderson. Taylor had only two points in 21 minutes, but she had nine rebounds in all. In March, Taylor and her team beat opponent Kristen Mann's team, Mersin, in the port town of Mersin, Turkey, with a score of 82–66. She had 10 points and seven rebounds in 20 minutes. On March 18 Taylor and Botaș faced off and beat team As Akyazi 123–83. She had scored 22 points in 20 minutes.

Botaș faced team Beşiktaș Cola on April 25, 2007, in the semifinals of the Turkish WBL Championships. Taylor and Botaș defeated Beşiktaș 72–70 in the third round. After this game, the score in the series was tied 2–2 in the semi-finals of the Turkish WBL series. The game to decide the finals was held on April 27 and Beşiktaș defeated Taylor and the rest of Botaș to reach the finals. The score was 89 for Beşiktaș, with Botaș totaling only 64. Taylor scored 14 points in the game and totaled six rebounds.

In total, Taylor averaged 16.5 points and 10.3 rebounds per game for Botaș.

=== Poland (2007–2009) ===
2007–2008

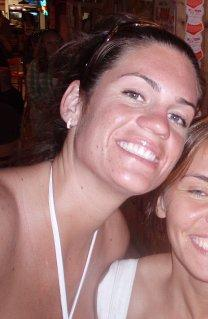
Taylor in 2007

Taylor spent the passing time recovering and resting until on September 7, 2007, she signed a contract with the Polish Women's League. During her stay in Poland, she shared an apartment with her teammate Meredith Alexis. Her team was called 'Energa Katarzynki Toruń' or 'Energa Toruń' for short. Her new team then went on to win a tournament in Toruń, Poland. In four games she averaged eight points per game.

In her first game playing with Energa Toruń on October 17, 2007 she faced off against Utex Row Rybnik. Energa Toruń lost the match 77–84. On October 24 Toruń played off against the Polish team Can-Pack Wisla. She scored 13 points and made eight rebounds as well as making two blocks. Energa Toruń ultimately lost the game. On October 31, Energa Toruń faced PKM Duda. In the game Taylor scored fewer points than in the previous game, scoring only 12 points, but she made a far stronger showing on the defensive and made more rebounds in the game making a total of 11 rebounds in all. She also made 1=one blocked shot. Duda went on to win the game with a total of 67–54.

Taylor's losing streak continued when Energa Toruń lost the November 3 game against KSSSE AZS PWSZ. Energa Toruń lost the match 62–73. She scored eight points and made seven rebounds. In contrast to her highest score of 11 points this season in the previous game, she made no blocks in this one. Energa Toruń next faced Lotos PKO BP on November 10. She scored 10 points in the game and made five rebounds as well as making two blocks. Lotos PKO BP went on to win the game scoring 94 points while Energa Toruń was only able to score 68. On November 18 Energa Toruń faced off against Siemens AGD. Taylor scored seven points in the game and made six rebounds as well as making four blocked shots. Energa Toruń narrowly lost the game with 74 points to Lotos' 77.

Energa Toruń next faced off against faced Siemens AGD on November 22. Taylor scored 16 points and made nine rebounds. She only played for a total of only 20 minutes in the game. However, she was not as defensive as previous games and only made two blocks. Energa went on to win the match with 85 points to Siemens AGD's 64. It was not a league game, but a Polish Cup qualifier.

Taylor's scoring continued in dominating fashion. Energa Toruń next faced off against CCC Polkowice on November 25. She scored 23 points in the game and was the largest contributor to the team's victory. She scored more points in the game then either player on both teams and scored seven points higher than her previous season-high 16 points one game before. She made two blocks and eight rebounds. Energa Toruń went on to narrowly win the game with 68 points to Energa Toruń's 65. Her contribution was the major factor in helping Energa Toruń win the game. The much needed win had effectively broken Energa Toruń's losing streak and enabled them to win their first league game.

On December 2 Energa Toruń faced off against Cukierki Odra Brzeg. Taylor was dominating throughout and scored a massive 28 points. She also made 11 rebounds. She scored more points in the game then either player on both teams and scored six points more than her previous season-high 23 points one game before. Again, she was not as defensive and made no blocked shots in this game. Energa Toruń eventually emerged the winner with the score at 77–63. Taylor was the foremost contributor in the game and played a major factor in securing Energa Toruń the victory. Her presence on the team was credited with allowing Energa Toruń to win the game.

On December 8 she and Energa Toruń faced Arcus SMS Pzkosz. Taylor scored more points in the game than either player on both teams. This time she scored an enormous thirty three pointse. The second highest score was made by Energa Toruń teammate Anna Marczewska who was the only other player beside Taylor to make a double score, but made only eleven points, which Taylor easily exceeded by almost triple. She also made 13 rebounds, one steal and one pass. Defensively she made no blocks in this game. An evaluation of her at the end of the game (combining the points, passes, blocks and other plays the player made during the game) was easily the highest in the game and was double that of the second highest score of 16, at 43 points. She was fouled 10 times by the opposite team. Taylor's dominating performance on the court and large contribution of points had all but enabled Energa Toruń to win the game. They won with a score of 80 points, securing their fourth victory. Arcus SMS Pzkosz was only able to score 45 points. For her performance against Arcus SMS Taylor received the title of the Most Valuable Player of round 11 of the Ford Germaz Class of the Polish Women's League. With this performance, she ranked second in the league in round 11, averaging 19.4 per game.

Taylor and Energa Toruń next faced off against KK AZS Jelenia Gora on December 16. Coming off the heels of her victory against Arcus SMS game and her recognised contributions towards several of Energa Toruń's victories, she was struck down with bad luck. Early in the game Taylor was expected to pull off another career high. Only seven minutes after Taylor was in the game she was caught elbowing a player in the face. The referee had then decided called a foul on Lindsay. She was sent off the court after playing for only seven minutes and 51 seconds. Because she was only on the court for such a short period of time she was only able to make just 2 points and 2 rebounds and no blocks. After the game, Taylor expressed disappointment that the referee had decided to call her for a foul but commented that ultimately it was their decision to call and what ever they called she would agree with it. Energa Toruń eventually lost the match to KK AZS Jelenia. Energa Toruń managed to secure 51 points. However, KK AZS Jelenia Gora was able to score 55 points which enabled them to narrowly win the game.

Against MUKS Poznań on December 21 Taylor scored 29 points, putting her way ahead of all the players. Again she scored more points in the game then either player on both teams. The second-highest score of the game, Energa Toruń teammate Emilia Tłumak, scored 15. Taylor made 10 rebounds and four blocks. Energa Toruń eventually lost the match to MUKS Poznań 66-78 points. Because of her performance in the game she was placed back in the top three women in total points in the League.

On January 6, 2008 Energa Toruń lost against Utex Row Rybnik 54–60. Taylor had 15 points in the game, seven rebounds and no blocks. On January 20. Energa Toruń played against TS Wisła Can Pack Kraków in their own gym. Taylor was only able to make 14 points in the game during 34 minutes of play but she was able to make 20 rebounds, two blocks and two passes. Energa Toruń won the match in a surprise upset over TS Wisła Can Pack Kraków with 73–68 points. Taylor's evaluation at the end of the game was 28 points, higher than all her teammates and any other player in the game, placing her back up as second in the league for game evaluation category and the league's Top Five in rebounds.

Taylor and Energa Toruń INEA AZS Poznoń on January 30, 2008, with Energa Toruń losing the match 69–75 points. She was able to score 20 points and make 11 rebounds and a block. Energa Toruń would lose again on February 10 to PKM Duda PWSZ Leszno, 67–73 points, before finally securing a narrow win against KSSSE AZS PWSZ Gorzów, 66-64.

Taylor and Energa Toruń faced a rematch against Lotos PKO BP, As in the previous game Energa Toruń lost 65–91.

The season ended in early April 2008. she finished with the highest point average of any player in the league with 16.9. and her overall average was the highest in the league at 21.9 points, the second highest was 18.4. She was also awarded the Center of the Year award as well as earning a place on the 1st Team, All-Imports Team and the All-Defensive Team.

2008–2009

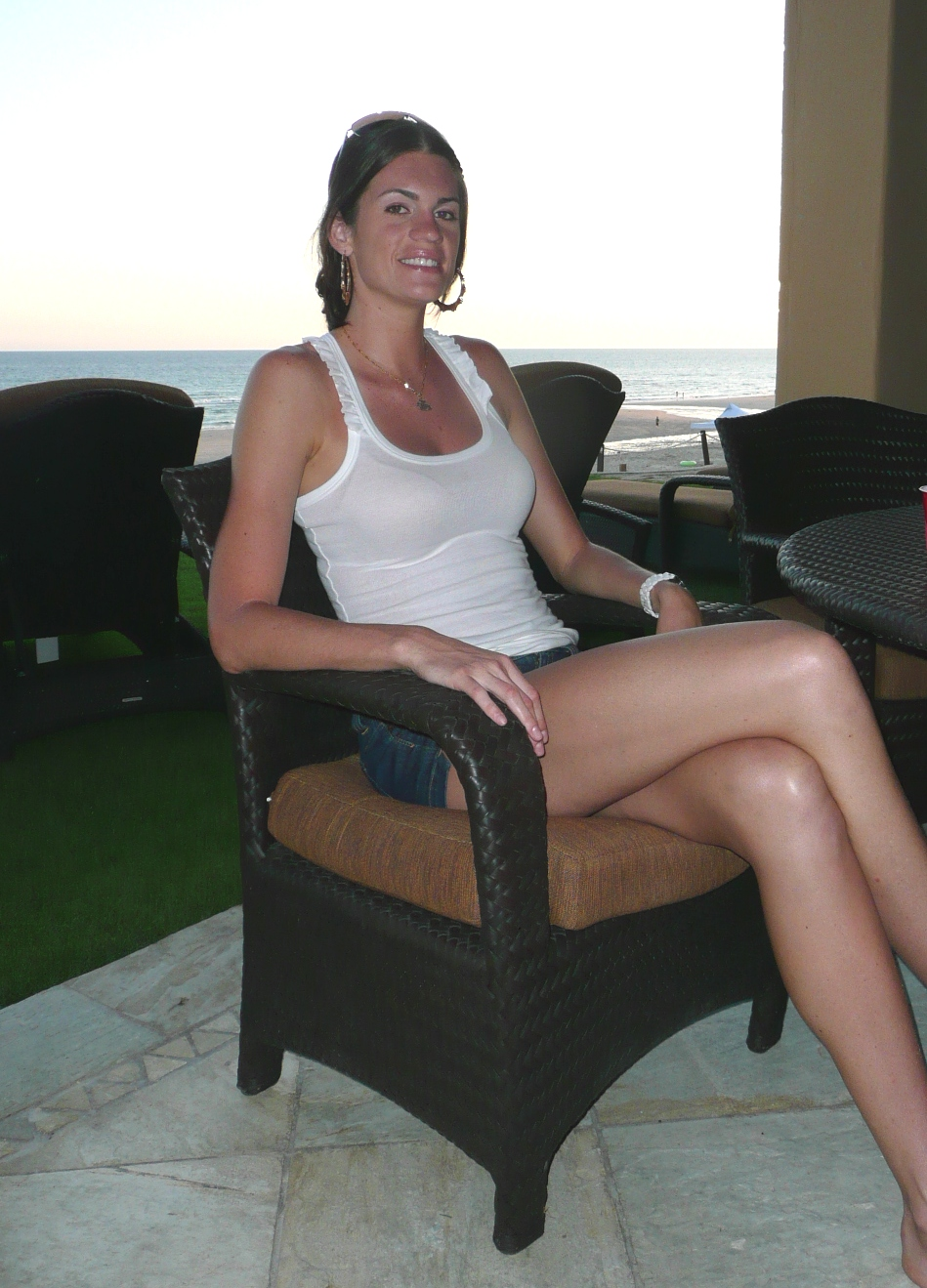
Lindsay Taylor in Rocky Point, Mexico, May 2009

In early August 2008 she announced she had signed a contract with KSSSE AZS PWSZ Gorzów Wielkopolski (AZS Gorzow for short) in the Polish Women's Basketball League (PLKK).

September 2008 saw the start of the women's Polish league season beginning with Gorzow pulling off a victory against last season's second best team, Lotos PKO. Taylor had her best game of the season on October 11 against Utex Row Rybnik with 22 points, 14 rebounds and a game-high 27 points. She was named Player of Week #7 for her performance during this game.

Gorzów had gone undefeated for eleven games until narrowly losing to CCC Polkowice. In the last game of 2008, Taylor would play against her Polish former team Energa Toruń resulting in a narrowly lost game. They also went undefeated in the Euro Cup until playing Dynamo Moscow, suffering a 64–93 defeat. The second half of the season resumed again in January 2009. After winning CCC in a best of five series, Gorzów advanced to the Championship finals but narrowly lost against Lotos PKO BP and emerged as the runners-up.

=== France (2009–2010) ===
From 2009 to 2010 Taylor played for the Ligue Féminine de BasketBall (LFB), her second stint playing in the LFB. Her team was the Nantes Rezé. The 2009–10 season started on September 26 with Nantes Rezé winning at Aix-en-Provence 90–70. She finished as the game's high scorer with 23 points. Taylor went on to play in a further seventeen games but did not the Championship, instead she competed and won the French Challenge (more or less the tournament for the teams that did not make the French Championship). This was particularly impressive considering this team finished last during the previous season. She achieved the highest points per game that season: 16.1.

=== China (2010–2014) ===
Taylor played for the Qujing Yunnan Chinese Basketball Association for the next three years with two brief stints with the Nantes-Rezé in the Ligue Féminine de Basketball in 2011 and training camp with the Seattle Storm in 2012. She played three seasons with the Qujing Yunnan over the 2010–11, 2011–12 and 2013–14 seasons.

Taylor lived together with her teammates in a hotel. Certain restrictions were placed on the players and they weren't allowed to use the Internet or leave the facility to run errands. Taylor was able to venture out and run errands with the permission of her interpreter. In the 2010–11 season Taylor averaged 23.5 points, 9.5 rebounds and a league-leading 2.4 blocks per game. The language barrier also limited opportunities to get instructions. She received the All-Chinese WCBA 1st Team award in 2011.

In the 2013-14 season, she appeared in 22 games, averaging 18.7 points per game, 10.1 rebounds per game and 2.1 blocks per game. The season was considered a strong performance in her career and she was named to the Asia-Basket.com All-Chinese WCBA Honourable Mention.

=== Korea (2014–2015) ===
Taylor began her 12th overseas basketball season in October, 2014 with Guri KDB Life Winnus in the Women's Korean Basketball League. The league is small but very competitive. Her former team was based in Guri just east of Seoul, South Korea and after two relocations, moved to Busan in 2019; one American teammate is Devereaux Peters, a Notre Dame 2012 graduate and later a Minnesota Lynx. In 28 games Taylor averaged 12.3 ppg, 6.9 rpg (#5 in the league), 1.2 apg and 1.3 bpg last season.

== Legacy ==
Taylor received criticism and praise. Mark French, once said Taylor "has unlimited potential on the court" and called her "one of the fastest learners". He went on to say that she made the game look easier than most girls her size.

Taylor received criticism for her ability to be an effective center; the Washington Post commented that she "cannot control her size" and she often ended up "blocking her own players" in practice. In its analysis of the prospected centers in the 2004 WNBA Draft, the Seattle Storm criticized Taylor: ‘As long as Taylor could tie her shoes and walk without tripping on her own feet, she'd be a WNBA prospect,’ and she had not been an effective dominating force at UC Santa Barbara despite her size and facing what it considered relatively weak Big West competition.

== Personal life ==
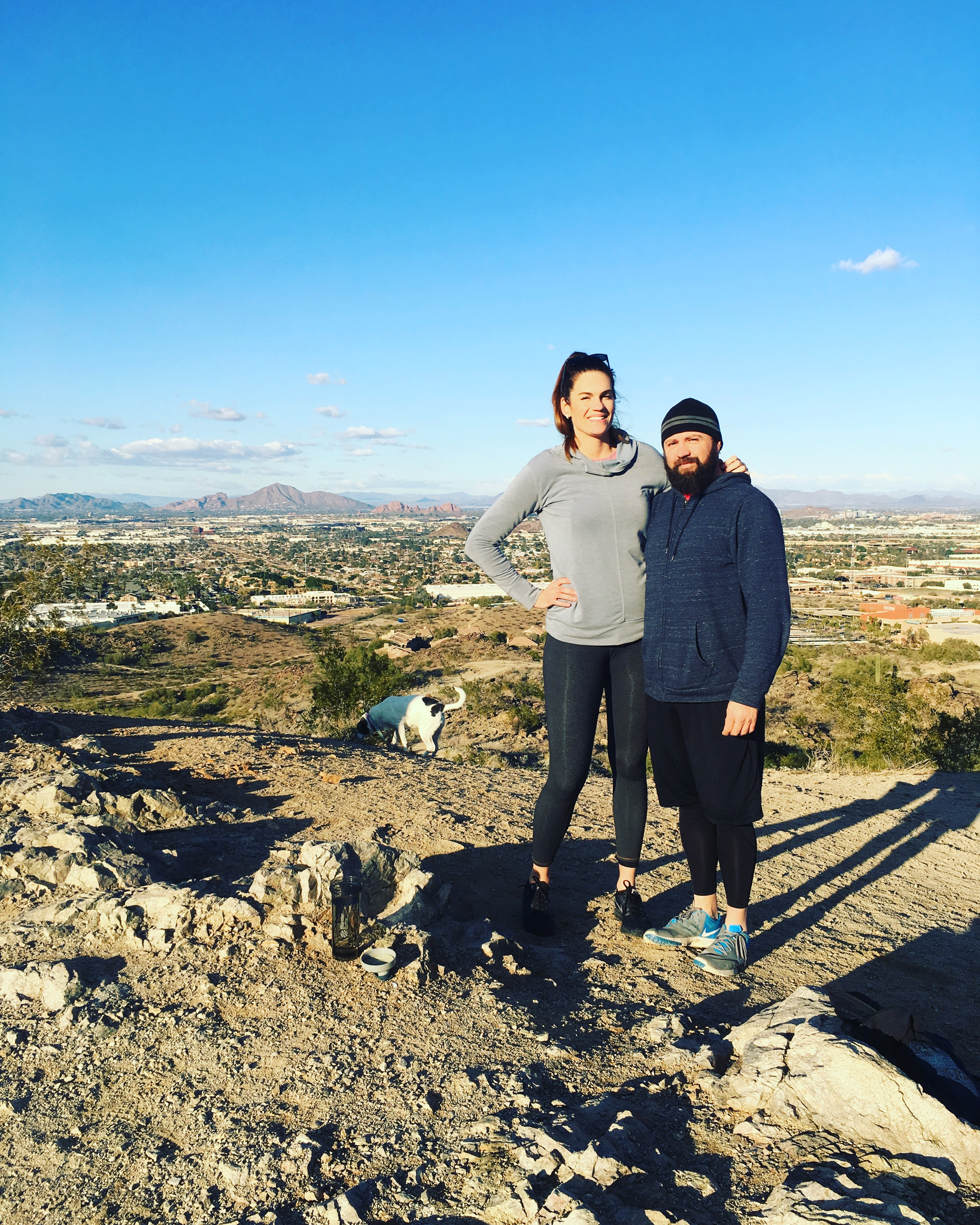
Taylor on a hike

Taylor expressed interest in potentially teaching school after her basketball career was over and she has also expressed an interest in government and politics. She also majored in religious studies. Off the court, Taylor has been known for her unassuming ways and sense of humor.

Taylor claimed that there isn't a lot of advantages to being so tall, "only than you can use the top shelf in your cupboard without any problems." and she felt the biggest advantages are in sports where her prestigious height have afforded her advantages. She stated, "I feel I have a presence on the court. I hope I intimidate other people." Another advantage Taylor possessed, as she expressed, is what she described as her "bird's eye view of everything" on the court. Taylor's height also made it difficult for other players to guard and block her and are generally unable to overpower her.

She has found shopping and the facilities of countries like Poland, such as toilets and baths, bothersome because they are not adequately suited for her height but did not experience the same problem in the US. She has objected to being labeled lanky, but preferred to being called 'slender' instead.

== Honors and awards ==
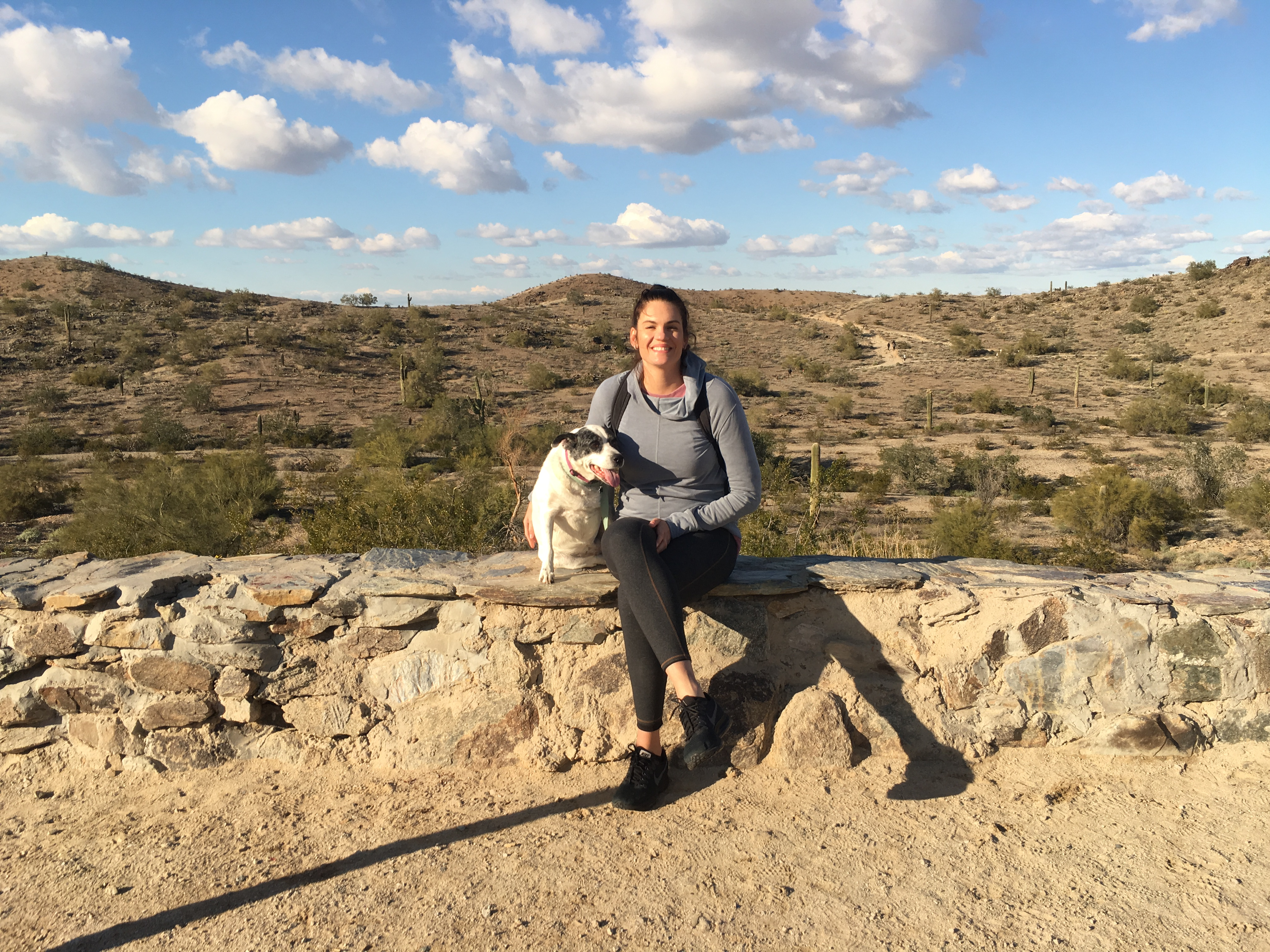
Taylor in January 2019

Taylor had received numerous awards over the years and has set several records. Below are some of the awards she has won.

College honors

- Named 2003 All-America honorable mention by the Associated Press, Basketball Times and Kodak/WBCA.
- Earned 2003 Big West Conference Player of the Year honors and to the All-Big West first team.
- Selected the 2003 Big West tournament MVP and to the Big West All-Tournament Team, averaged 16.7 ppg. and 5.7 rpg.
- Named the 2002 Big West tournament MVP, averaged 15.0 ppg., 8.3 rpg. and 2.0 bpg.
- A three-time Big West All-Tournament Team selection.
- Named 2001 and 2002 All-Big West second team.
- Selected as the 2001 Big West Freshman of the Year.
- Named to the 2001 Big West All-Tournament Team.
- Earned six Big West Player of the Week honors during her career.
- Named conference player of the week after averaging 16.5 points and 8.5 rebounds to close the regular season at Cal State Fullerton on February 28, 2001

College records

- Currently holds the UCSB all-time career record for scoring (1,767) field goal percentage (.559) and blocked shots (243).
- Set UCSB's all-time single-season blocked shot record with 69 in 2001–02.

College notes

- Averaged a team-best 16.8 ppg and added 7.5 rpg as a junior, while helping UC Santa Barbara to a 27–5 record, the Big West regular season and tournament titles and the NCAA Tournament second round.
- Ranked 25th among all 2002–03 Division I leaders in field goal percentage.
- Ranked 18th nationally in 2001–02 in blocked shots.
- Recorded 12 points and 13 rebounds in UCSB's 2002 NCAA Tournament.
- Finished her sophomore season as the Big West's leader in field goal percentage (550).
- Paced the 2000–01 Big West in blocked shots (1.6) and field goal percentage (650).
- Ranked third in Gaucho's history for total rebounds with 877 points.
- Earned her 24th career double-double and ninth this season in the form of 17 points coupled with a career-high-tying 16 rebounds on February 28, 2004.
- On November 25, she scored a game-high of 23 points and became UCSB's record holder in career blocked shots.

High school notes

- Attended Chandler High School (Ariz.), where she helped her school to a pair of regional titles and the 1999 state championship.
- Averaged 19.2 ppg., 11.0 rpg. and 3.1 bpg. as a senior.
- Named the 1999 Arizona Player of the Year by Gatorade.
- Earned 1999 All-America fourth team honors from Parade Magazine.
- Named 1999 all-state first team by the Arizona Republic and Arizona Dairy Council.

Other

- She was a member of the 2003 USA World Championship for Young Women Team and captured the gold medal with a 7–1 record in Sibenik, Croatia, averaged 6.4 ppg. and 2.9 rpg.
- Posted tournament bests of 16 points and eight rebounds in the USA's 95–46 victory over South Korea.
- Helped the U.S. to a 4–0 record in exhibition play against Australia and Brazil's young women national teams, averaged 3.0 ppg. in the final two contests.
- Most Valuable Player of round 11 of the Ford Germaz Class of the Polish Women's League.

== See also ==
- UC Santa Barbara
- Basketball at the 2003 Pan American Games
