= Kristen Mann =

American basketball player (born 1983)

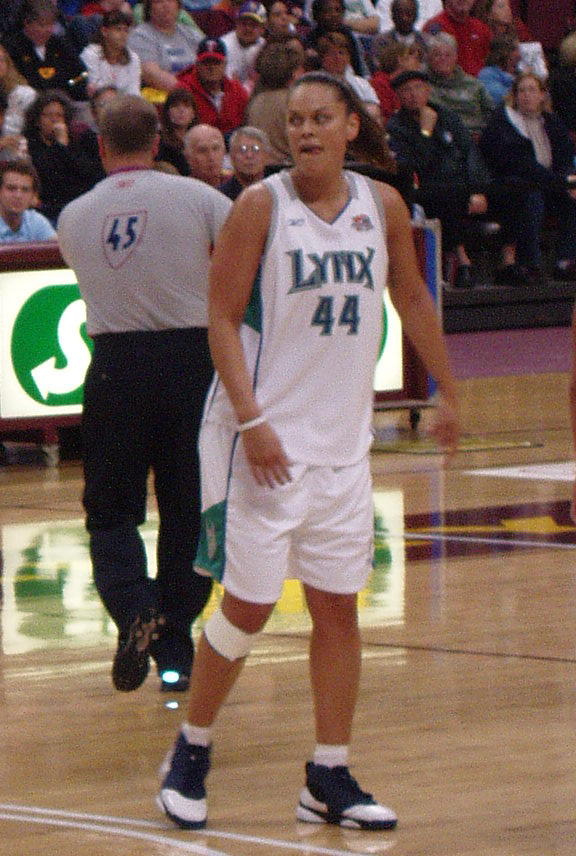

Personal information
- Born: August 10, 1983 (age 43) Lakewood, California, U.S.
- Listed height: 6 ft 2 in (1.88 m)
- Listed weight: 185 lb (84 kg)

Career information
- High school: Foothill (Santa Ana, California)
- College: UC Santa Barbara (2001–2005)
- WNBA draft: 2005: 1st round, 11th overall pick
- Drafted by: Minnesota Lynx
- Playing career: 2005–present
- Position: Forward
- Number: 44, 11, 24

Career history
- 2005–2007: Minnesota Lynx
- 2008: Atlanta Dream
- 2008: Indiana Fever
- 2009: Washington Mystics
- 2010: Minnesota Lynx

Career highlights
- WNBA Commissioner's Cup Champion (2026); Big West Player of the Year (2005); 3× First-team All-Big West (2003-2005); Big West Freshman of the Year (2002); Big West All-Freshman team (2002)
- Stats at WNBA.com
- Stats at Basketball Reference

Kristen Cherie Mann (born August 10, 1983) is an American former professional basketball player who played for the Minnesota Lynx, Atlanta Dream, Indiana Fever, and Washington Mystics of the Women's National Basketball Association (WNBA). She played college basketball for the UC Santa Barbara Gauchos. After her WNBA career she was active in several European teams, mainly playing for French teams in the Ligue Féminine de Basketball.

== Early life ==
Born in Lakewood, California on August 10, 1983, Mann is the daughter of Kathy Deeds and Gene Mann. She has two brothers, Mac and Guy, and one sister, Payton, all younger than her. Mann is of Samoan descent. She went to Foothill High School, playing both basketball and softball. She played first and third base for her high school softball team, and the Foothill Knights won the state and national titles in 2000. In basketball she holds 25 school records, and was a Nike All-American.

== College career ==
Mann went to the UC Santa Barbara, alongside fellow WNBA player Lindsay Taylor, and graduated in 2005 with a degree in Women's Studies. She played basketball all four years at UCSB, and played softball for the 2003 season. She played first base and was a designated hitter with a batting average of .263 for the season. Some of her college awards are being First Team All-Big West in 2003–04 & 2002–03, 2001–02 Big-West Freshman of the Year, 2004–05 John Wooden All-American, and being awarded the Kristen Lohman trophy. The Gauchos won the Big-West tournament championship in 2002–03. During the summer of 2003 Mann was a member of Team USA and helped win the gold medal in the inaugural FIBA World Championship for Young Women in Sibenik, Croatia.

== UC Santa Barbara statistics ==
Legend
| GP | Games played | GS | Games started | MPG | Minutes per game |
| FG% | Field goal percentage | 3P% | 3-point field goal percentage | FT% | Free throw percentage |
| RPG | Rebounds per game | APG | Assists per game | SPG | Steals per game |
| BPG | Blocks per game | PPG | Points per game | **Bold** | Career high |

| Year | Team | GP | Points | FG% | 3P% | FT% | RPG | APG | SPG | BPG | PPG |
|---|---|---|---|---|---|---|---|---|---|---|---|
| 2001–02 | UCSB | 32 | 401 | 43.0 | 32.4 | 72.3 | 6.5 | 1.8 | 1.4 | 0.1 | 12.5 |
| 2002–03 | UCSB | 20 | 284 | 44.0 | **36.7** | **73.0** | 6.5 | 1.9 | **1.5** | **0.3** | 14.2 |
| 2003–04 | UCSB | **33** | 450 | **46.0** | 35.5 | 65.1 | 6.6 | **2.5** | **1.5** | **0.3** | 13.6 |
| 2004–05 | UCSB | 29 | **565** | 44.0 | 31.7 | 68.3 | **9.4** | 2.3 | 1.2 | 0.2 | **19.5** |
| Career | UCSB | 114 | 1700 | 44.3 | 33.8 | 69.7 | 7.3 | 2.1 | 1.4 | 0.2 | 14.9 |

== WNBA career ==
Following her collegiate career, she was selected 11th overall in the 2005 WNBA draft. In her rookie season, Mann averaged 3.0 points and 7.7 minutes per game. In 2006, Mann was inserted into the starting line-up and averaged 7.4 points, 3.4 rebounds and 2.8 assists per game.

In 2007, Mann started 17 of the Lynx 34 games and posted career highs in scoring (7.6 ppg) and rebounds (3.6 rpg). On February 6, 2008, the Atlanta Dream selected Mann in their expansion draft. She was traded to Indiana midway through the 2008 season in exchange for Alison Bales.

While a member of the Indiana Fever, she played in five games averaging just over 6 minutes player per game and averaging 0.4 points per game. After the 2008 season, Mann was signed by the Washington Mystics, who cited her "ability to stretch the defense with her three point shot, a very high basketball IQ, and a competitive work ethic" as the reasons why they had chosen to bring her on board.

Former Lynx teammates Lindsey Harding and Eshaya Murphy joined Mann for training camping prior to the 2009 season. On June 4, 2009, Mann was waived from the Mystics, but she was re-signed on June 16, 2009.

Mann signed partway through the 2010 season with the Minnesota Lynx and would play a total of five games with them to finish out the season.

== WNBA career statistics ==
Legend
| GP | Games played | GS | Games started | MPG | Minutes per game | RPG | Rebounds per game |
| APG | Assists per game | SPG | Steals per game | BPG | Blocks per game | PPG | Points per game |
| TO | Turnovers per game | FG% | Field-goal percentage | 3P% | 3-point field-goal percentage | FT% | Free-throw percentage |
| **Bold** | Career best | ° | League leader |

=== Regular season ===
| Year | Team | GP | GS | MPG | FG% | 3P% | FT% | RPG | APG | SPG | BPG | TO | PPG |
|---|---|---|---|---|---|---|---|---|---|---|---|---|---|
| 2005 | Minnesota | 24 | 0 | 7.7 | **.500** | .000 | .688 | 1.5 | 0.5 | 0.3 | 0.0 | 0.3 | 3.0 |
| 2006 | Minnesota | 33 | **33** | **27.1** | .387 | .375 | .735 | 3.4 | **2.8** | 0.6 | 0.2 | 1.5 | 7.4 |
| 2007 | Minnesota | **34** | 17 | 25.9 | .375 | .349 | .784 | **3.6** | 1.3 | **0.9** | 0.2 | 0.8 | **7.6** |
| 2008 | Atlanta | 13 | 8 | 17.2 | .409 | **.500** | **1.000** | 1.5 | 1.1 | 0.6 | **0.3** | 1.1 | 3.5 |
| 2008 | Indiana | 5 | 0 | 6.2 | .250 | .000 | .000 | 0.8 | 0.2 | 0.2 | 0.2 | 0.2 | 0.4 |
| 2009 | Washington | 16 | 0 | 5.9 | .357 | .222 | **1.000** | 0.9 | 0.4 | 0.2 | 0.0 | 0.2 | 1.6 |
| 2010 | Minnesota | 5 | 0 | 3.0 | .167 | .250 | .000 | 0.0 | 0.0 | 0.0 | 0.0 | 0.0 | 0.6 |
| Career | 6 years, 4 teams | 130 | 58 | 17.9 | .390 | .339 | .763 | 2.4 | 1.3 | 0.5 | 0.2 | 0.8 | 5.0 |

=== Playoffs ===
| Year | Team | GP | GS | MPG | FG% | 3P% | FT% | RPG | APG | SPG | BPG | TO | PPG |
|---|---|---|---|---|---|---|---|---|---|---|---|---|---|
| 2008 | Indiana | **3** | 0 | **10.0** | .444 | .333 | .000 | 0.3 | **0.3** | **0.3** | 0.0 | 1.3 | **3.3** |
| 2009 | Washington | 1 | 0 | 8.0 | **.500** | **.500** | .000 | **1.0** | 0.0 | 0.0 | 0.0 | 1.0 | 3.0 |
| Career | 2 years, 2 teams | 4 | 0 | 9.5 | .455 | .375 | .000 | 0.5 | 0.3 | 0.3 | 0.0 | 1.3 | 3.3 |

== Overseas career ==
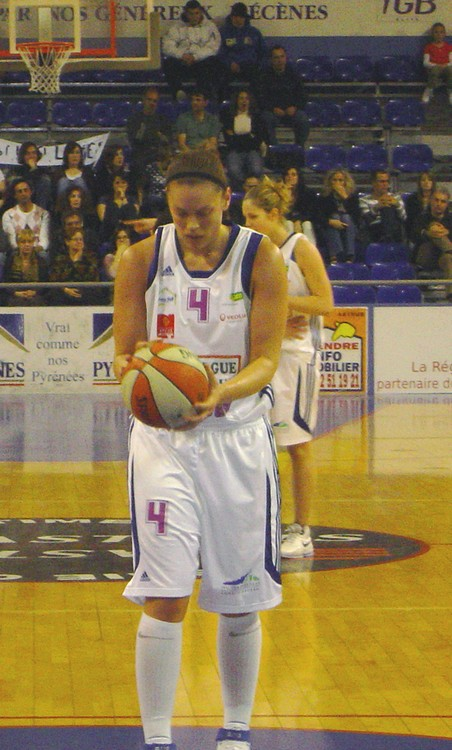
Kristen Mann with her French team of Tarbes GB.

| Seasons | Team | Country |
|---|---|---|
| 2005–2006 | Zaragoza Mann Filter | Spain |
| 2006–2007 | Mersin Büyükşehir Belediye | Turkey |
| 2007–2008 | Tarbes GB | France |
| 2009–2010 | SK Cēsis | Latvia |
| 2010–2011 | Flammes Carolo Basket Ardennes | France |
| 2011–2013 | Lattes Montpellier | France |
| 2013–2014 | Toulouse Metropole Basket | France |
| 2014–2015 | CAB Madeira | Portugal |
| 2015–2016 | TTT Riga | Latvia |
| 2016–2017 | BLMA Lattes Montpellier | France |
| 2017 | Roche Vendée | France |
| 2018–2019 | USOM Mondeville | France |
| 2019–2020 | CBBS Charnay-Macon | France |
| 2020–2022 | Tango Bourges Basket | France |
| 2022–2023 | Basket Landes | France |
| 2023-2024 | Tango Bourges Basket | France |

Mann and her team won the national French league as well as the EuroCup in 2022, she also became cup champion in France in 2013, 2023 and 2024. After the 2023–2024 season, Mann retired from professional basketball.

== Music career ==
She is also a singer/songwriter and has released recordings with Gabriel Mann, no relation, but was a college friend under the band name Sapphica. She plays the acoustic guitar and sings for the duo. She has also released music as a solo artist under her name, Kristen Mann.
