= LaToya Bond =

American basketball player (born 1984)

Personal information
- Born: 13 February 1984 (age 42) Decatur, Illinois
- Listed height: 5 ft 9 in (1.75 m)
- Listed weight: 132 lb (60 kg)

Career information
- High school: Urbana (Urbana, Illinois)
- College: Missouri (2002–2006)
- WNBA draft: 2006: 2nd round, 27th overall pick
- Drafted by: Charlotte Sting
- Position: Guard

Career history
- 2006: Charlotte Sting
- 2008: Indiana Fever

Career highlights
- First-team All-Big 12 (2006); Big 12 All-Defensive Team (2006)
- Stats at Basketball Reference

LaToya Bond (born February 13, 1984) is an American professional women's basketball player with the Indiana Fever of the WNBA. Born in Decatur, Illinois, Bond is 5 ft 9 in (1.75 m) tall and weighs 132 lb (60 kg).

At Urbana High School in Urbana, Illinois, Bond was selected to the 2000 and 2001 State Farm Holiday Classic all-tournament teams. She finished her last season at Mizzou as the 7th leading scorer in the Big 12, blasting past the 1000 point mile-marker. She was named a Kodak/WBCA All-America Honorable Mention and made the All Big 12 First Team as well as the Big 12 Defensive Team.

After her 2002 graduation from Urbana High School, she played for the NCAA Division I Lady Tigers of the University of Missouri. She was selected by the Charlotte Sting in the second round (27th pick overall) of the 2006 WNBA draft. The Sting folded after the 2006 WNBA season, and she was selected by the Sacramento Monarchs in the 2007 dispersal draft. However, she never played for the franchise. Before the start of the 2008 season she signed with the Indiana Fever. She has also played overseas for teams in Cyprus, Israel, and Poland.

== Career statistics ==
Legend
GP	Games played	GS	Games started	MPG	Minutes per game	RPG	Rebounds per game
APG	Assists per game	SPG	Steals per game	BPG	Blocks per game	PPG	Points per game
TO	Turnovers per game	FG%	Field-goal percentage	3P%	3-point field-goal percentage	FT%	Free-throw percentage
**Bold**	Career best	°	League leader

=== WNBA ===
==== Regular season ====
Year	Team	GP	GS	MPG	FG%	3P%	FT%	RPG	APG	SPG	BPG	TO	PPG
2006	Charlotte	**34**	**5**	**17.9**	**39.9**	**21.7**	74.0	**1.4**	**2.1**	**1.0**	**0.2**	2.4	**5.7**
2007	Did not play (waived)												
2008	Indiana	32	1	10.2	28.9	21.4	**81.3**	1.0	0.8	0.5	0.1	**1.0**	2.3
Career	2 years, 2 teams	66	6	14.1	35.9	21.6	75.3	1.2	1.5	0.8	0.2	1.7	4.0

=== College ===
Legend
GP	Games played	GS	Games started	MPG	Minutes per game
FG%	Field goal percentage	3P%	3-point field goal percentage	FT%	Free throw percentage
RPG	Rebounds per game	APG	Assists per game	SPG	Steals per game
BPG	Blocks per game	PPG	Points per game	**Bold**	Career high

Year	Team	GP	Points	FG%	3P%	FT%	RPG	APG	SPG	BPG	PPG
2002-03	Missouri	29	93	37.5	35.0	64.5	1.3	0.7	0.9	0.1	3.2
2003-04	Missouri	21	214	42.0	25.5	79.4	3.6	**4.5**	1.9	0.4	10.2
2004-05	Missouri	29	346	44.2	32.9	74.6	**4.9**	4.0	**2.2**	0.4	11.9
2005-06	Missouri	**31**	**533**	**50.1**	**38.9**	**83.2**	3.8	3.2	2.0	**0.8**	**17.2**
Career	Missouri	110	1186	45.6	34.4	78.1	3.4	3.0	1.8	0.4	10.8
