= Doneeka Lewis =

American-Bulgarian basketball player (born 1982)

Personal information
- Born: July 19, 1982 (age 44) New Orleans, Louisiana, U.S.
- Listed height: 5 ft 9 in (1.75 m)

Career information
- High school: O. P. Walker (New Orleans, Louisiana)
- College: LSU (2000–2004)
- WNBA draft: 2004: 2nd round, 25th overall pick
- Drafted by: Los Angeles Sparks
- Playing career: 2004–present
- Position: Shooting guard
- Number: 6

Career history
- 2004–2008: Los Angeles Sparks
- 2007: Seattle Storm
- 2008: Indiana Fever
- 2008–2009: Liomatic Umbertide
- 2009–2010: İstanbul Üniversitesi
- 2010–2011: Galatasaray
- 2011: Tulsa Shock
- 2016–2017: Olympiacos
- Stats at Basketball Reference

Doneeka Danyell Lewis, née Hodges (born July 19, 1982), is an American-Bulgarian professional basketball currently playing for Olympiacos in Greece. A 5–9 guard, she was drafted with the 25th overall pick in the 2004 WNBA draft for the Los Angeles Sparks, out of Louisiana State University.

== Personal life ==
She is the twin sister of Roneeka Hodges. She married Gentry Lewis in the fall of 2004.

== College career ==
In her college career, she scored 1,484 points, and collected 418 rebounds. She ranks 11th on the school's all-time scoring list. In 2002 and 2004, she earned second team All SEC honors.

== Career statistics ==
Legend
GP	Games played	GS	Games started	MPG	Minutes per game	RPG	Rebounds per game
APG	Assists per game	SPG	Steals per game	BPG	Blocks per game	PPG	Points per game
TO	Turnovers per game	FG%	Field-goal percentage	3P%	3-point field-goal percentage	FT%	Free-throw percentage
**Bold**	Career best	°	League leader

=== WNBA ===
==== Regular season ====
Year	Team	GP	GS	MPG	FG%	3P%	FT%	RPG	APG	SPG	BPG	TO	PPG
2004	Los Angeles	24	3	10.2	30.8	23.5	70.0	0.9	0.7	0.4	0.1	**0.7**	1.8
2005	Los Angeles	32	**11**	**20.9**	**41.4**	**44.9**	68.0	1.5	2.4	0.6	**0.2**	1.5	5.6
2006	Los Angeles	**34**	3	13.4	31.9	29.5	91.3	1.2	1.9	0.4	0.1	1.3	3.9
2007	Seattle	7	0	4.7	30.8	0.0	**100.0**	0.3	0.9	0.1	0.0	0.9	1.4
2008	Indiana	8	0	7.0	35.0	28.6	0.0	0.8	0.3	0.4	0.1	0.8	2.0
2009	Did not play (waived)												
2010	Did not play (did not appear in WNBA)												
2011	Indiana	5	2	20.2	27.9	26.9	0.0	**2.2**	**2.8**	**0.8**	**0.2**	2.6	**6.2**
Career	6 years, 3 teams	110	19	14.2	35.0	33.9	78.3	1.2	1.6	0.5	0.1	1.2	3.7

=== Playoffs ===
Year	Team	GP	GS	MPG	FG%	3P%	FT%	RPG	APG	SPG	BPG	TO	PPG
2004	Los Angeles	3	0	9.7	40.0	**100.0**	0.0	**1.3**	1.3	0.3	0.0	1.0	1.7
2005	Los Angeles	2	0	6.5	**50.0**	50.0	0.0	0.5	1.0	**0.5**	0.0	1.0	1.5
2006	Los Angeles	**5**	0	8.0	30.8	20.0	0.0	1.0	1.2	0.2	0.0	**0.6**	1.8
2008	Indiana	2	0	**12.5**	37.5	40.0	0.0	1.0	**1.5**	0.0	0.0	1.5	**4.0**
Career	4 years, 2 teams	12	0	8.9	35.7	38.5	0.0	1.0	1.3	0.3	0.0	0.9	2.1

=== College ===
Legend
GP	Games played	GS	Games started	MPG	Minutes per game
FG%	Field goal percentage	3P%	3-point field goal percentage	FT%	Free throw percentage
RPG	Rebounds per game	APG	Assists per game	SPG	Steals per game
BPG	Blocks per game	PPG	Points per game	**Bold**	Career high

Year	Team	GP	Points	FG%	3P%	FT%	RPG	APG	SPG	BPG	PPG
2000–01	LSU	31	214	37.0	30.4	66.7	2.4	1.8	1.2	0.0	6.9
2001–02	LSU	30	459	**42.1**	**38.1**	**77.3**	**4.5**	**3.5**	1.4	**0.4**	**15.3**
2002–03	LSU	34	323	40.9	35.8	73.5	2.4	2.6	1.4	0.3	9.5
2003–04	LSU	**35**	**488**	40.2	33.2	76.7	3.7	3.2	**1.5**	0.2	13.9
Career	LSU	130	1484	40.4	34.7	74.7	3.2	2.8	1.4	0.2	11.4

== WNBA career ==
In four seasons, she has scored 362 points, and has collected 113 rebounds, 165 assists, 43 steals, and 13 blocks. She scored a career high 17 points, during the 2005 season, against the San Antonio Silver Stars.

== Overseas career ==
She is currently playing for Greek champions Olympiacos (2016–17). She played for Galatasaray Medical Park of Turkey in the 2010–11 season.
