= Sherill Baker =

American basketball player and coach (born 1982)

George Washington Revolutionaries
- Title: Assistant coach
- Conference: Atlantic 10

Personal information
- Born: December 3, 1982 (age 43)
- Listed height: 5 ft 8 in (1.73 m)
- Listed weight: 125 lb (57 kg)

Career information
- High school: Greater Atlanta Christian School (Norcross, Georgia)
- College: Georgia (2002–2006)
- WNBA draft: 2006: 1st round, 12th overall pick
- Drafted by: New York Liberty
- Playing career: 2006–2009
- Position: Point guard
- Number: 10, 5, 9
- Coaching career: 2014–present

Career history

Playing
- 2006–2007: New York Liberty
- 2007: Los Angeles Sparks
- 2008: Indiana Fever
- 2009: Detroit Shock

Coaching
- 2014–2016: Auburn (assistant)
- 2016–2019: Kennesaw State (assistant)
- 2019–2023: Georgia State (assistant)
- 2023–2025: Bucknell (assoc. head coach)
- 2025-present: George Washington (assistant)

Career highlights
- SEC Defensive Player of the Year (2006); First-team All-SEC (2006); Miss Georgia Basketball (2002)
- Stats at Basketball Reference

Sherill Shavette Baker (born December 3, 1982) is a current American collegiate women's basketball assistant coach with the George Washington Revolutionaries and former professional women's basketball player in the WNBA, most recently with the Detroit Shock.

Baker attended Greater Atlanta Christian School, then attended college at the University of Georgia and graduated in 2006. Following her collegiate career, she was selected 12th overall in the 2006 WNBA draft by the New York Liberty and traded to the Los Angeles Sparks on June 20, 2007, in exchange for Lisa Willis.

She signed with the Indiana Fever on May 22, 2008.

She played for Elitzur Ramla in Israel during the 2007–08 WNBA off-season. She then spent the 2008-09 off-season in Israel again, this time for Maccabi Bnot Ashdod.

== Career statistics ==
=== WNBA career statistics ===
Legend
GP	Games played	GS	Games started	MPG	Minutes per game	RPG	Rebounds per game
APG	Assists per game	SPG	Steals per game	BPG	Blocks per game	PPG	Points per game
TO	Turnovers per game	FG%	Field-goal percentage	3P%	3-point field-goal percentage	FT%	Free-throw percentage
**Bold**	Career best	°	League leader

==== Regular season ====
Year	Team	GP	GS	MPG	FG%	3P%	FT%	RPG	APG	SPG	BPG	TO	PPG
2006	New York	**34**	**16**	18.1	38.6	27.3	85.7	1.6	1.0	1.4	0.0	1.5	7.4
2007	New York	3	0	4.3	**100.0**	**100.0**	0.0	0.3	0.0	0.0	0.0	**0.0**	1.7
2007	Los Angeles	24	11	**20.5**	32.8	21.2	83.3	**2.9**	**3.2**	**1.5**	**0.1**	2.7	**8.5**
2008	Indiana	13	0	8.5	32.4	0.0	73.5	1.7	1.2	0.7	**0.1**	0.8	3.8
2009	Detroit	1	0	11.0	66.7	0.0	**100.0**	1.0	1.0	1.0	0.0	1.0	7.0
Career	1 year, 3 teams	75	27	16.5	36.3	25.0	82.5	2.0	1.7	1.2	0.1	1.7	6.9

=== College career statistics ===
Legend
GP	Games played	GS	Games started	MPG	Minutes per game
FG%	Field goal percentage	3P%	3-point field goal percentage	FT%	Free throw percentage
RPG	Rebounds per game	APG	Assists per game	SPG	Steals per game
BPG	Blocks per game	PPG	Points per game	**Bold**	Career high

Year	Team	GP	Points	FG%	3P%	FT%	RPG	APG	SPG	BPG	PPG
2002-03	Georgia	30	289	.375	.276	.708	4.3	2.8	3.0	**0.4**	9.6
2003-04	Georgia	**35**	390	.412	**.350**	.721	3.8	**3.4**	3.0	0.1	11.1
2004-05	Georgia	34	388	.432	.184	.770	4.6	2.7	2.5	0.1	11.4
2005-06	Georgia	32	**598**	**.530**	.250	.809	**4.7**	3.2	**4.7**	0.2	**18.7**
Career		131	1665	.445	.268	.761	4.4	3.0	3.3	0.2	12.7

== See also ==
- List of NCAA Division I women's basketball career steals leaders
