= Tammy Sutton-Brown =

Canadian basketball player (born 1978)

Personal information
- Born: January 27, 1978 (age 48) Markham, Ontario, Canada
- Listed height: 6 ft 4 in (1.93 m)
- Listed weight: 199 lb (90 kg)

Career information
- High school: Markham District (Markham, Ontario)
- College: Rutgers (1997–2001)
- WNBA draft: 2001: 2nd round, 18th overall pick
- Drafted by: Charlotte Sting
- Playing career: 2001–2012
- Position: Center

Career history
- 2001–2006: Charlotte Sting
- 2001–2002: Kumho Life Falcons
- 2002–2003: VBM-SGAU Samara
- 2003–2004: Kumho Life Falcons
- 2004–2005: USK Prague
- 2005: VBM-SGAU Samara
- 2005: Dynamo Moscow
- 2006–2011: Fenerbahçe
- 2007–2012: Indiana Fever

Career highlights
- WNBA champion (2012); 2× WNBA All-Star (2002, 2007); 5× Turkish National League champion (2007–2011); 3× Turkish Cup winner (2007–2009); 2× Turkish President Cup winner (2007, 2010); Korean National League champion (2004); Inducted into the Canadian Basketball Hall of Fame (2023)
- Stats at WNBA.com
- Stats at Basketball Reference

Tamara Kim "Tammy" Sutton-Brown (born January 27, 1978) is a Canadian retired professional basketball player. Her primary position was center. Throughout her playing career, Sutton-Brown played for the Charlotte Sting and Indiana Fever of the Women's National Basketball Association (WNBA). She had also played in Asia and Europe. Sutton-Brown has won a WNBA championship (2012) and is a two-time WNBA All-Star.

== Early life ==
Born in Markham, Ontario, Sutton-Brown is of Jamaican descent. She was rated Canada's top female at Armadale public school basketball prospect by the Toronto Star.

== College years ==
Sutton-Brown attended Rutgers University, where she majored in women's studies. As a senior, she was nicknamed Simba from the Disney movie "The Lion King" due to her coming of age at Rutgers. She owns a career field goal percentage of 57.6 which ranks third in the Rutgers career records.

== WNBA career ==
Sutton-Brown was selected 18th overall in the second round of the 2001 WNBA draft by the Charlotte Sting. In her rookie season, Sutton-Brown experienced her first WNBA Finals appearance as the Sting advanced all the way to the WNBA Finals but were defeated in a 2-game sweep by the Los Angeles Sparks.

Sutton-Brown had a breakout year in her second season, averaging 11.9 ppg, 6.0 rpg and 1.1 bpg. Her season performance got her selected into the 2002 WNBA All-Star Game, becoming the first Canadian WNBA player to be voted as an all-star.

Sutton-Brown finished the 2004 season ranked second in the WNBA in blocks (a career-high 2.0 bpg). She became the Sting's all-time leader in blocks in 2004 with 196 career blocked shots, and as of 2006 only the 10th player to achieve 200 blocks.

After the 2006 season ended, the Sting ceased operations and most of the remaining players were entered in a dispersal draft that followed the Sting's demise. Since she was an unrestricted free agent at the end of the 2006 season, she was exempt from entering the dispersal draft. However, on March 22, 2007, she signed with the Indiana Fever. She would play alongside superstar forward Tamika Catchings.

During the 2007 season with the Fever, Sutton-Brown was selected into the 2007 WNBA All-Star Game and had averaged a career-high in scoring with 12 ppg.

In the 2009 season, Sutton-Brown experienced her second WNBA Finals appearance as the Fever advanced all the way to the WNBA Finals for the first time in franchise history, but fell short to the Phoenix Mercury in five games.

During her final season in the WNBA, Sutton-Brown became the fifth player in league history to accumulate 3,000 points, 2,000 rebounds and 400 blocks in their career. Later in the season, Sutton-Brown won her first WNBA championship with the Fever in 2012 when they defeated the Minnesota Lynx 3–1 in the finals. Following the championship victory, Sutton-Brown became a free agent and eventually retired from the WNBA after 12 seasons. As of her retirement, Sutton-Brown ranked 22nd in career rebounds and 5th in career blocks.

== WNBA career statistics ==
Legend
GP	Games played	GS	Games started	MPG	Minutes per game	RPG	Rebounds per game
APG	Assists per game	SPG	Steals per game	BPG	Blocks per game	PPG	Points per game
TO	Turnovers per game	FG%	Field-goal percentage	3P%	3-point field-goal percentage	FT%	Free-throw percentage
**Bold**	Career best	°	League leader

†	Denotes seasons in which Sutton-Brown won a WNBA championship

=== Regular season ===
Year	Team	GP	GS	MPG	FG%	3P%	FT%	RPG	APG	SPG	BPG	TO	PPG
2001	Charlotte	29	21	20.8	.394	.000	.722	4.4	0.4	0.7	1.3	1.3	6.8
2002	Charlotte	32	29	27.7	**.531**	.000	.713	6.0	0.5	0.9	1.1	1.5	11.9
2003	Charlotte	**34**	33	25.4	.421	.000	.687	5.9	0.4	0.5	1.4	1.7	8.4
2004	Charlotte	**34**	**34**	28.5	.473	.000	.698	6.2	0.4	0.9	**2.0**	2.0	9.6
2005	Charlotte	**34**	33	26.1	.509	.000	.681	5.3	0.4	0.8	1.0	2.0	9.4
2006	Charlotte	30	30	26.7	.488	.000	.639	5.9	0.7	0.8	1.8	2.3	11.2
2007	Indiana	**34**	33	25.3	.485	.000	.716	5.4	**0.9**	**1.0**	1.3	2.5	**12.0**
2008	Indiana	33	33	**29.0**	.495	.000	.673	**6.3**	0.5	0.6	1.7	2.0	11.8
2009	Indiana	27	25	25.2	.466	.000	.745	5.9	**0.9**	0.5	1.4	1.8	9.9
2010	Indiana	**34**	**34**	25.7	.450	.000	.707	5.1	**0.9**	0.9	1.6	1.6	8.1
2011	Indiana	**34**	26	19.0	.489	.000	.743	3.1	0.6	**1.0**	1.2	0.9	5.5
2012^{†}	Indiana	33	32	16.4	.422	.000	**.800**	2.8	0.7	0.7	0.8	**0.6**	3.9
Career	12 years, 2 teams	388	363	24.7	.479	.000	.700	5.2	0.6	0.8	1.4	1.7	9.0

=== Postseason ===
Year	Team	GP	GS	MPG	FG%	3P%	FT%	RPG	APG	SPG	BPG	TO	PPG
2001	Charlotte	8	8	20.9	.543	.000	.714	3.3	0.5	0.1	1.3	1.0	7.5
2002	Charlotte	2	2	28.0	.500	.000	.167	6.0	0.0	0.5	0.5	3.5	7.5
2003	Charlotte	2	1	16.0	.286	.000	.000	3.0	0.0	0.0	1.5	1.0	2.0
2007	Indiana	6	6	20.5	.349	.000	.571	4.7	0.7	0.1	**2.0**	1.3	7.0
2008	Indiana	3	3	31.0	.387	.000	**.952**	5.3	0.3	0.3	1.3	2.0	**14.7**
2009	Indiana	**10**	**10**	**31.1**	.528	.000	.689	5.6	0.5	0.9	1.4	3.0	14.3
2010	Indiana	3	3	30.0	.476	.000	.818	4.3	0.3	**1.3**	0.6	2.6	9.7
2011	Indiana	6	6	28.7	.463	.000	.864	**6.8**	**1.3**	0.8	1.8	2.6	9.5
2012^{†}	Indiana	7	1	8.6	**.571**	.000	.444	2.0	0.4	0.2	0.1	**0.4**	3.4
Career	9 years, 2 teams	47	40	23.5	.477	.000	.696	4.5	0.6	0.5	1.3	1.9	8.9

== Overseas career ==
Sutton-Brown's first season overseas was in Korea where she played for the Kumho Life Falcons in 2001–02 off-season. In the 2002–03 off-season, Sutton-Brown played for VBM-SGAU Samara in Russia. In the 2003–04 off-season, Sutton-Brown returned to Korea to play for the Kumho Life Falcons and won a championship with the team. In the 2004–05 off-season, Sutton-Brown played for USK Prague in Czech Republic and spent the rest of the off-season playing for VBM-SGAU Samara and Dynamo Moscow. Sutton-Brown played for Fenerbahçe since the start of the 2006–07 off-season for 5 years where she won five championships.

- Turkish Women's Basketball League (5) : 2006–07, 2007–08, 2008–09, 2009–10, 2010–11
- Turkish Cup (3): 2006–07, 2007–08, 2008–09
- Turkish President Cup (2): 2006–07, 2009–10
- EuroLeague Women
  - Quarter-Final (4): 2006–07, 2007–08, 2008–09, 2009–10
- EuroCup Women
  - Runners-up (1): 2004–05
  - Fourth (1): 2003–04
- Women's Korean Basketball League
  - WKBL champion (1): 2003–04

=== International clubs ===
- (Czech Republic) USK Prague
- (Russia) Dynamo Moscow
- (Russia) VBM-SGAU Samara
- (South Korea) Kumho Life Falcons
- (Turkey) Fenerbahçe Istanbul

== International career ==
Sutton-Brown played for the Canada women's national basketball team in the 2000 Summer Olympics. She averaged 10.3 ppg and 7.3 rpg in 6 games with the team throughout the Olympics.

== Life after basketball ==
Since her retirement from professional basketball, Sutton-Brown launched TSquared, a marketing company that partners up professional athletes with various brands. She also became an author and is working on a series of children’s books. In October 2021, Sutton-Brown was named the Associate of Basketball and Franchise Operations for Raptors 905, the G League affiliate of the Toronto Raptors. In July 2023, it was announced that Sutton-Brown would be inducted into the Canadian Basketball Hall of Fame.
