= Dispersal draft =

Reassignment of players from one team among other existing teams

A dispersal draft is a process in professional sports for assigning players to a new team when an existing team folds or is merged into another team. Like most other sports drafts, most dispersal drafts are conducted in closed leagues and are intended to prevent bidding wars and to maintain a league's competitive balance when a folded or merged team's roster of players is absorbed into the rest of a league's teams. As generally all or most of a team's players would become free agents following their team's disestablishment or merger.

Dispersal drafts are more commonly seen in emerging sports (such as soccer or women's basketball in the United States) or alternative leagues where initial support for a team failed to remain consistent and the team was unable to survive financially resulting in a team folding or merging with another team.

== Examples of dispersal drafts ==
=== Australian rules football ===
- In 1996 and 1997, the Australian Football League held an expansion and dispersal draft as part of the 1996 national draft and the 1997 pre-season draft as Port Adelaide would enter the AFL for the 1997 season, and the Brisbane Bears had taken over Fitzroy's playing operations after Fitzroy had folded at the end of Round 22. The Bears were allowed to recruit eight of the 19 Fitzroy players that nominated for the draft as part of the agreement to take the Lions nickname and Fitzroy's remaining AFL property, while three Fitzroy players were taken by Port Adelaide, and the remaining eight players were drafted by other teams.

=== Baseball ===
- During the 2004 Nippon Professional Baseball realignment, a dispersal draft was held on November 8, 2004, to build the rosters of the newly created Tohoku Rakuten Golden Eagles and the newly merged Orix Buffaloes.

=== Basketball ===
- The National Basketball Association (NBA) had two dispersal drafts in the 1950–51 season: In October 1950, a dispersal draft for the Chicago Stags franchise was conducted, and in January 1951, the Washington Capitols demise led to a second dispersal draft. There would also be a dispersal draft in the NBA during the 1954–55 when the original Baltimore Bullets folded operations early into the season in November 1954.
- The American Basketball Association (ABA) had a dispersal draft in June 1972 when two teams folded and had two drafts within a month of each other in October and November 1975 as two more teams folded during what turned out to be the final season of the ABA.
- On August 8, 1976, as part of the ABA-NBA merger agreement, a dispersal draft was conducted to assign teams for the players on the two ABA franchises which had folded following the agreement.
- The Women's National Basketball Association (WNBA) had five such drafts over a seven-year period. In the 2003 season, the first dispersal draft was held after the Miami Sol and Portland Fire folded. This was followed by four other times: the 2004 season, after the Cleveland Rockers folded; the 2007 season, after the Charlotte Sting folded; the 2009 season, after Houston Comets folded; and the 2010 season, after the Sacramento Monarchs folded. In each draft, all remaining WNBA teams were allowed a draft pick in reverse order of their regular-season record from the preceding season.

=== Gridiron football ===
- The National Football League (NFL) held a dispersal draft on June 2, 1950, to allocate players from the four remaining teams in the All-America Football Conference who would not be joining the NFL.
- In 1996, the Canadian Football League (CFL) conducted a dispersal draft which consisted of players from the rosters of the Birmingham Barracudas, Memphis Mad Dogs, San Antonio Texans and Shreveport Pirates in order to return the CFL to a nine-team format with all franchises based in Canadian cities. The CFL conducted another dispersal draft the following year, when the Ottawa Rough Riders ceased operations; those players under contract by the team were dispersed amongst the eight remaining teams.
- On April 9, 2006, the Ottawa Renegades had their team operations suspended by the Canadian Football League. On April 12, 2006, the former players still under contract and those that the Renegades had the rights to, were distributed amongst the remaining eight teams. Quarterback Kerry Joseph was selected #1 overall by the Saskatchewan Roughriders after they traded with the Hamilton Tiger-Cats for the rights to the #1 pick.
- The United Football League conducted a dispersal draft prior to the 2011 season to accommodate the shutdown of the Hartford Colonials. Five rounds were held among the UFL's four remaining teams, the twenty players who were drafted went to their new teams, and the remaining players became free agents.
- On September 6, 2013, the Arena Football League held a dispersal draft to distribute the players of the dormant Chicago Rush and Utah Blaze franchises. They referred to the dispersal draft as the "Offseason Assignment Process".
- On January 5 and 15, 2024, the United Football League held a dispersal draft to reallocate players from the 8 XFL and USFL teams that did not survive the merging of the two leagues.
- On March 5, 2025, the Liga de Fútbol Americano Profesional held a dispersal draft to distribute players from the Galgos de Tijuana and Jefes de Ciudad Juárez.

=== Ice hockey ===
- In June 1975, the World Hockey Association conducted a dispersal draft after the Baltimore Blades and Chicago Cougars folded at the end of the previous season.
- In June 1978, the National Hockey League (NHL) allowed the financially struggling Cleveland Barons and Minnesota North Stars to merge under the North Stars banner. The North Stars were allowed to keep some of the players from each team, and the remaining players went into the 1978 NHL Dispersal Draft.
- In 1991, the NHL conducted a Dispersal Draft in order to split a new team, the San Jose Sharks, from the Minnesota North Stars as a compromise after the North Stars owners requested permission to move the financially struggling franchise to the San Francisco Bay Area, effectively undoing the 1978 merger between the Stars and the California Golden Seals.
- On January 5, 2007, the Southern Professional Hockey League conducted a one-round seven team dispersal draft after the SPHL terminated the Florida Seals franchise midway through the season; the seven players who were drafted went to their new teams, while the remaining players became free agents.

=== Lacrosse ===
- On September 10, 2026, the league announced that the Philadelphia Wings and the Ottawa Black Bears would cease operations. The league held a dispersal draft on September 15.

=== Soccer ===
- In 2002, Major League Soccer held a Dispersal Draft after shutting down the Tampa Bay Mutiny and Miami Fusion teams. Another draft was conducted on November 19, 2014, to distribute the players of Chivas USA.
- The Major Indoor Soccer League shut down the San Diego Sockers and Monterrey Fury in December 2004 as a result of various issues, including unpaid debts and insolvency. Players in those teams were then distributed to the remaining teams in a dispersal draft, and the order of player selection was in reverse order of the winning percentage of the remaining teams (excluding games against San Diego and Monterrey and the playoffs) from the 2003–04 seasons and the 2004–2005 season up to that point.
