= 2006 Chicago Sky season =

- Head coach: Dave Cowens
- Arena: UIC Pavilion

Results
- Record: 5–29 (.147)
- Place: 7th (Eastern)
- Playoff finish: Did not qualify

The 2006 WNBA season was the first for the Chicago Sky. On February 8, 2005, the David Stern announced that the WNBA would be expanding to Chicago beginning with the 2006 season. Chicago became the second team in league history to be owned and operated outside of the NBA entity. On September 20, 2005, the Chicago franchise announced their team name to be the Sky.

Dave Cowens was named the first head coach of the Sky. The year was much of a struggle for the Sky, as they went 5–29 in their first season. Rookie Candice Dupree was named to the All-Rookie Team following the season for her solid rookie season. Cowens left the team following the year.

== Transactions ==
=== Expansion draft ===
Chicago had the right to acquire one player from each of the 13 WNBA teams. Each team had designated a maximum of six players who would not be available for selection in the expansion draft.

Player	Nationality	Team
Jia Perkins	United States	Charlotte Sting
Brooke Wyckoff	United States	Connecticut Sun
Elaine Powell	United States	Detroit Shock
Kiesha Brown	United States	Houston Comets
Deanna Jackson	United States	Indiana Fever
Laura Macchi	Italy	Los Angeles Sparks
Stacey Lovelace-Tolbert	United States	Minnesota Lynx
DeTrina White	United States	New York Liberty
Ashley Robinson	United States	Phoenix Mercury
Chelsea Newton	United States	Sacramento Monarchs
Bernadette Ngoyisa	Republic of the Congo	San Antonio Silver Stars
Francesca Zara	Italy	Seattle Storm
Stacey Dales-Schuman	Canada	Washington Mystics

=== WNBA draft ===
Round	Pick	Player	Nationality	College
1	6	Candice Dupree	United States	Temple
2	20	Jennifer Harris	United States	Washburn
3	34	Kerri Gardin	United States	Virginia Tech

=== Trades and roster changes ===
Date	Transaction
April 7, 2006	Signed Candice Dupree, Jennifer Harris, and Kerri Gardin to rookie-scale contracts
April 13, 2006	Signed Mfon Udoka
April 18, 2006	Signed Missy Traversi to a training-camp contract
April 19, 2006	Signed Steffanie Blackmon to a training-camp contract
April 30, 2006	Waived Missy Traversi and Mfon Udoka
May 1, 2006	Signed Holly Tyler and Julie McBride
May 1, 2006	Waived Steffanie Blackmon
May 4, 2006	Waived Holly Tyler
May 8, 2006	Signed Tera Bjorklund
May 12, 2006	Claimed Rita Williams off of waivers
May 12, 2006	Traded the 14th pick in the 2007 WNBA draft to the Houston Comets in exchange for Liz Moeggenberg and the 21st pick in the 2007 WNBA draft
May 13, 2006	Waived Julie McBride
May 16, 2006	Waived Jennifer Harris and Kerri Gardin
May 16, 2006	Full-season suspend Francesca Zara due to overseas commitments
May 18, 2006	Waived Rita Williams
June 28, 2006	Nikki McCray announces her retirement from the WNBA
June 29, 2006	Traded Ashley Robinson to the Seattle Storm in exchange for Cisti Greenwalt and the 20th pick in the 2007 WNBA draft
June 29, 2006	Waived Cisti Greenwalt
July 5, 2006	Signed Katie Cronin to a 7-day contract
July 24, 2006	Signed Katie Cronin and Coretta Brown
September 13, 2006	Dave Cowens resigns as head coach

== Roster ==
2006 Chicago Sky roster
Players
Coaches

Pos.	No.	Nat.	Name	Height	Weight	From
G	14	(United States)	Brown, Coretta	5' 9" (1.75m)	150 lb (68kg)	North Carolina
G/F	33	(United States)	Cronin, Katie	6' 0" (1.83m)	155 lb (70kg)	Colorado State
G	12	(Canada)	Dales, Stacy	6' 0" (1.83m)	155 lb (70kg)	Oklahoma
F	4	(United States)	Dupree, Candice	6' 2" (1.88m)	178 lb (81kg)	Temple
F	23	(United States)	Jackson, Deanna	6' 2" (1.88m)	155 lb (70kg)	UAB
F	24	(United States)	Lassiter, Amanda	6' 1" (1.85m)	160 lb (73kg)	Missouri
C	32	(United States)	Lovelace, Stacey	6' 4" (1.93m)	170 lb (77kg)	Purdue
F	52	(United States)	Moeggenberg, Liz	6' 1" (1.85m)	195 lb (88kg)	Michigan State
G	2	(United States)	Newton, Chelsea	5' 11" (1.8m)	154 lb (70kg)	Rutgers
C	50	(Democratic Republic of the Congo)	Ngoyisa, Bernadette	6' 4" (1.93m)	195 lb (88kg)	Republic of the Congo
G	11	(United States)	Perkins, Jia	5' 8" (1.73m)	165 lb (75kg)	Texas Tech
G	5	(United States)	Powell, Elaine	5' 8" (1.73m)	150 lb (68kg)	LSU
F	21	(United States)	Wyckoff, Brooke	6' 1" (1.85m)	183 lb (83kg)	Florida State

Head coach
(United States) Dave Cowens (Florida State)
Assistant coaches
(United States) Steven Key (Boston University)

Legend

- (C) Team captain
- (DP) Unsigned draft pick
- (FA) Free agent
- (S) Suspended
- Injured

=== Depth ===
Pos.	Starter	Bench
C	Bernadette Ngoyisa	Stacey Lovelace
PF	Candice Dupree	Liz Moeggenberg; Deanna Jackson
SF	Amanda Lassiter	Brooke Wyckoff; Katie Cronin
SG	Stacey Dales	Chelsea Newton; Elaine Powell
PG	Jia Perkins	Coretta Brown

== Schedule ==
=== Regular season ===
2006 Regular Season Schedule
Total: 5–29 (Home: 3–14; Road: 2–15)
May: 1–3 (Home: 0–3; Road: 1–0)

Game	Date	Opponent	Score	High points	High rebounds	High assists	Location/Attendance	Record
1	May 20	@ Charlotte	83-82	Candice Dupree (19)	Candice Dupree (6)	Elaine Powell (3)	Time Warner Cable Arena; 6,010	1-0
2	May 23	Sacramento	63-76	Stacey Lovelace (11)	Ashley Robinson (8)	Elaine Powell (7)	UIC Pavilion; 5,112	1-1
3	May 26	Indiana	60-75	Jia Perkins (16)	Ashley Robinson (7)	Powell; Newton; Perkins (3)	UIC Pavilion; 3,151	1-2
4	May 30	Los Angeles	55-64	Jia Perkins (12)	Stacey Lovelace (11)	Brooke Wyckoff (4)	UIC Pavilion; 3,086	1-3

June: 1–10 (Home: 1–4; Road: 0–6)

Game	Date	Opponent	Score	High points	High rebounds	High assists	Location/Attendance	Record
5	June 2	@ Houston	60-71	Amanda Lassiter (14)	Deanna Jackson (7)	Perkins; Lassiter; Jackson (3)	Toyota Center; 5,397	1-4
6	June 4	Detroit	66-81	Amanda Lassiter (20)	Candice Dupree (7)	Candice Dupree (4)	UIC Pavilion; 3,135	1-5
7	June 7	@ Seattle	73-86	Dupree; Ngoyisa (16)	Bernadette Ngoyisa (8)	Amanda Lassiter (6)	KeyArena; 5,741	1-6
8	June 9	@ Los Angeles	65-73	Jia Perkins (19)	Jia Perkins (9)	Jia Perkins (4)	Staples Center; 7,282	1-7
9	June 10	@ Sacramento	70-80	Perkins; Dupree (17)	Bernadette Ngoyisa (10)	Jia Perkins (7)	ARCO Arena; 10,416	1-8
10	June 15	Seattle	61-74	Stacey Lovelace (15)	Candice Dupree (12)	Jia Perkins (7)	UIC Pavilion; 2,956	1-9
11	June 17	San Antonio	65-69	Jia Perkins (21)	Jia Perkins (10)	Brooke Wyckoff (4)	UIC Pavilion; 2,806	1-10
12	June 21	@ Indiana	55-77	Stacey Lovelace (13)	Deanna Jackson (8)	Ashley Robinson (3)	Bankers Life Fieldhouse; 6,310	1-11
13	June 23	Connecticut	79-84	Jia Perkins (13)	Candice Dupree (7)	Perkins; Wyckoff (4)	UIC Pavilion; 2,818	1-12
14	June 25	@ Phoenix	77-90	Candice Dupree (15)	Dupree; Perkins; Jackson (5)	Newton; Powell (2)	US Airways Center; 6,124	1-13
15	June 29	Charlotte	75-69	Candice Dupree (15)	Candice Dupree (7)	Chelsea Newton (4)	UIC Pavilion; 2,570	2-13

July: 2–9 (Home: 2–4; Road: 0–5)

Game	Date	Opponent	Score	High points	High rebounds	High assists	Location/Attendance	Record
16	July 1	@ San Antonio	57-69	Candice Dupree (16)	Candice Dupree (9)	Dupree; Newton (4)	AT&T Center; 6,060	2-14
17	July 7	New York	78-73	Candice Dupree (20)	Candice Dupree (6)	Dupree; Newton (3)	UIC Pavilion; 3,375	3-14
18	July 9	@ Washington	83-89	Lassiter; Ngoyisa (17)	Amanda Lassiter (7)	Amanda Lassiter (5)	Verizon Center; 7,618	3-15
19	July 14	Houston	77-82	Bernadette Ngoyisa (16)	Dupree; Lovelace (5)	Jia Perkins (6)	UIC Pavilion; 3,626	3-16
20	July 16	Washington	75-83	Stacey Dales (15)	Bernadette Ngoyisa (6)	Jia Perkins (4)	UIC Pavilion; 2,983	3-17
21	July 19	@ Minnesota	82-90	Candice Dupree (14)	Bernadette Ngoyisa (11)	Jia Perkins (6)	Target Center; 14,793	3-18
22	July 20	@ Connecticut	72-86	Jia Perkins (21)	Bernadette Ngoyisa (6)	Jia Perkins (6)	Mohegan Sun Arena; 6,740	3-19
23	July 22	@ Detroit	70-89	Perkins; Dales (12)	Candice Dupree (7)	Dupree; Newton; Dales (3)	Palace of Auburn Hills; 10,456	3-20
24	July 25	New York	72-79	Candice Dupree (22)	Amanda Lassiter (8)	Candice Dupree (5)	UIC Pavilion; 3,435	3-21
25	July 27	@ Washington	74-92	Ngoyisa; Dales (18)	Bernadette Ngoyisa (5)	Jia Perkins (10)	Verizon Center; 9,290	3-22
26	July 28	Minnesota	79-65	Stacey Dales (20)	Ngoyisa; Perkins (7)	Dales; Ngoyisa (4)	UIC Pavilion; 2,967	4-22
27	July 30	Indiana	64-69	Candice Dupree (25)	Bernadette Ngoyisa (6)	Perkins; Lassiter (6)	UIC Pavilion; 3,430	4-23

August: 1–6 (Home: 0–3; Road: 1–3)

Game	Date	Opponent	Score	High points	High rebounds	High assists	Location/Attendance	Record
28	August 1	Phoenix	70-90	Stacey Lovelace (14)	Bernadette Ngoyisa (9)	Liz Moeggenberg (4)	UIC Pavilion; 5,219	4-24
29	August 4	Detroit	49-76	Stacey Lovelace (10)	Bernadette Ngoyisa (8)	Liz Moeggenberg (3)	UIC Pavilion; 3,455	4-25
30	August 5	@ New York	69-80	Candice Dupree (24)	Candice Dupree (6)	Chelsea Newton (5)	Madison Square Garden; 8,872	4-26
31	August 8	Connecticut	59-85	Bernadette Ngoyisa (11)	Candice Dupree (10)	Brown; Dales (4)	UIC Pavilion; 3,520	4-27
32	August 10	@ Detroit	48-82	Candice Dupree (12)	Stacey Lovelace (7)	Amanda Lassiter (3)	Palace of Auburn Hills; 11,226	4-28
33	August 12	@ Charlotte	57-84	Bernadette Ngoyisa (23)	Dupree; Ngoyisa (10)	Coretta Brown (4)	Time Warner Cable Arena; 8,339	4-29
34	August 13	@ Indiana	80-73	Candice Dupree (24)	Chelsea Newton (9)	Amanda Lassiter (5)	Bankers Life Fieldhouse; 8,381	5-29

== Standings ==
Eastern Conference	W	L	PCT	GB	Home	Road	Conf.
z - Connecticut Sun	26	8	.765	–	14–3	12–5	15–5
x - Detroit Shock	23	11	.676	3.0	14–3	9–8	14–6
x - Indiana Fever	21	13	.618	5.0	12–5	9–8	12–8
x - Washington Mystics	18	16	.529	8.0	13–4	5–12	12–8
e - New York Liberty	11	23	.324	15.0	7–10	4–13	7–13
e - Charlotte Sting	11	23	.324	15.0	7–10	4–3	6–14
e - Chicago Sky	5	29	.147	21.0	3–14	2–15	4–16

== Statistics ==
Legend
GP	Games played	GS	Games started	MPG	Minutes per game	RPG	Rebounds per game
APG	Assists per game	SPG	Steals per game	BPG	Blocks per game	PPG	Points per game
FG%	Field-goal percentage	3P%	3-point field-goal percentage	FT%	Free-throw percentage	TO	Turnovers per game
PF	Fouls per game		Team leader		League leader

=== Regular season ===
Player	GP	GS	MPG	FG%	3P%	FT%	RPG	APG	SPG	BPG	PPG
Candice Dupree	34	31	30.4	45.7	0.0	77.9	5.5	1.8	1.3	0.7	13.7
Bernadette Ngoyisa	30	23	20.9	52.8	0.0	59.2	5.7	0.9	0.5	0.2	10.1
Jia Perkins	30	27	28.0	35.1	27.7	80.6	3.6	3.2	1.4	0.4	9.4
Amanda Lassiter	32	29	24.4	36.6	32.9	71.0	2.8	2.0	1.3	0.5	8.0
Stacey Lovelace	34	6	18.5	41.5	30.2	78.6	4.0	0.6	0.6	0.6	7.4
Stacey Dales	23	16	19.7	35.4	30.9	69.6	1.2	1.7	0.4	0.0	7.0
Chelsea Newton	27	11	24.0	33.5	26.5	73.8	2.6	2.1	1.3	0.3	6.5
Deanna Jackson	22	1	15.0	39.5	33.3	64.7	3.0	0.6	0.4	0.1	6.0
Elaine Powell	14	3	18.1	43.3	0.0	70.8	1.8	2.6	0.9	0.2	4.9
Brooke Wyckoff	15	13	22.9	24.2	23.3	80.0	2.7	2.2	0.9	0.8	3.3
Coretta Brown	15	2	16.8	27.1	27.3	50.0	1.5	1.7	0.7	0.0	3.2
Katie Cronin	11	0	12.1	30.0	30.8	28.6	1.1	0.2	0.5	0.2	2.2
Liz Moeggenberg	27	1	10.1	31.7	33.3	46.7	1.7	0.6	0.4	0.2	2.1
Nikki McCray	11	2	7.5	36.4	20.0	71.4	0.5	0.5	0.6	0.1	2.0
Ashley Robinson	12	5	10.4	31.0	100.0	33.3	2.8	0.5	0.2	0.7	1.8

== Awards and honors ==
Recipient	Award	Date awarded	Ref.
Candice Dupree	WNBA All-Star Selection	July 11	
Candice Dupree	WNBA All-Rookie Team	August 20	
