= 2006 Charlotte Sting season =

- Head coach: Muggsy Bogues
- Arena: Charlotte Bobcats Arena

Results
- Record: 11–23 (.324)
- Place: 6th (Eastern)
- Playoff finish: Did not qualify

The 2006 WNBA season was the tenth and final season for the Charlotte Sting.

== Offseason ==
Jia Perkins was picked up by the Chicago Sky in the WNBA Expansion Draft.

=== WNBA draft ===
Round	Pick	Player	Nationality	School/Team/Country
1	3	Monique Currie (G)	United States	Duke
1	10	Tye'sha Fluker (C)	United States	Tennessee
2	27	LaToya Bond (G)	United States	Missouri

== Regular season ==
=== Season standings ===
Eastern Conference	W	L	PCT	GB	Home	Road	Conf.
z - Connecticut Sun	26	8	.765	–	14–3	12–5	15–5
x - Detroit Shock	23	11	.676	3.0	14–3	9–8	14–6
x - Indiana Fever	21	13	.618	5.0	12–5	9–8	12–8
x - Washington Mystics	18	16	.529	8.0	13–4	5–12	12–8
e - New York Liberty	11	23	.324	15.0	7–10	4–13	7–13
e - Charlotte Sting	11	23	.324	15.0	7–10	4–3	6–14
e - Chicago Sky	5	29	.147	21.0	3–14	2–15	4–16

=== Season schedule ===
Game	Date	Opponent	Result	Record
1	May 20	Chicago	L 82–83	0–1
2	May 23	Los Angeles	L 65–72	0–2
3	May 25	Washington	W 73–63	1–2
4	June 1	Connecticut	L 65–89	1–3
5	June 3	@ Connecticut	L 71–89	1–4
6	June 9	Indiana	W 70–59	2–4
7	June 13	@ Washington	L 70–87	2–5
8	June 15	Washington	L 77–96	2–6
9	June 18	@ Indiana	L 85–92 (OT)	2–7
10	June 20	Connecticut	L 66–90	2–8
11	June 22	Detroit	L 74–86	2–9
12	June 23	@ Houston	L 70–85	2–10
13	June 25	@ Detroit	L 61–71	2–11
14	June 27	@ New York	W 73–67	3–11
15	June 29	@ Chicago	L 69–75	3–12
16	July 1	Sacramento	L 57–65	3–13
17	July 6	@ Connecticut	L 71–76	3–14
18	July 8	@ Los Angeles	L 64–66	3–15
19	July 9	@ Sacramento	L 61–70	3–16
20	July 14	San Antonio	W 81–65	4–16
21	July 15	Indiana	W 75–65	5–16
22	July 19	@ Detroit	W 73–67	6–16
23	July 20	Seattle	W 86–72	7–16
24	July 22	Phoenix	L 74–78	7–17
25	July 25	Minnesota	L 62–70	7–18
26	July 27	@ Minnesota	W 81–68	8–18
27	July 29	New York	L 80–85	8–19
28	July 30	@ Washington	L 73–78	8–20
29	August 1	@ San Antonio	W 68–65	9–20
30	August 3	@ Phoenix	L 84–112	9–21
31	August 5	@ Seattle	L 81–87	9–22
32	August 8	Houston	W 68–57	10–22
33	August 11	@ New York	L 62–64	10–23
34	August 12	Chicago	W 84–57	11–23

== Player stats ==
Player	Minutes	Field goals	Rebounds	Assists	Steals	Blocks	Points
Tangela Smith	972	178	180	50	41	29	445
Sheri Sam	990	137	172	90	55	3	359
Monique Currie	844	87	132	87	34	4	339
Tammy Sutton-Brown	800	118	176	20	26	55	335
Kelly Mazzante	725	105	99	64	47	6	302
LaToya Bond	614	63	49	73	35	8	193
Helen Darling	607	51	59	82	35	3	158
Janel McCarville	421	54	105	25	17	20	136
Tye'sha Fluker	324	30	66	9	2	14	76
Allison Feaster	309	19	20	21	13	2	55
Ayana Walker	181	17	31	3	10	10	46
Yelena Leuchanka	38	5	5	3	0	1	12
