= Amanda Lassiter =

American basketball player (born 1979)

Personal information
- Born: June 9, 1979 San Francisco, California, U.S.
- Listed height: 6 ft 1 in (1.85 m)

Career information
- High school: George Washington (San Francisco, California)
- College: Central Arizona College; Missouri
- WNBA draft: 2001: 1st round, 15th overall pick
- Drafted by: Houston Comets
- Position: Forward

Career history
- 2001–2002: Houston Comets
- 2002–2003: Seattle Storm
- 2004–2005: Minnesota Lynx
- 2006: Chicago Sky

Career highlights
- First-team All-Big 12 (2001)
- Stats at Basketball Reference

Amanda Lassiter (born June 9, 1979) is an American former professional women's basketball player. After graduating from George Washington High School in San Francisco, Lassiter attended college at University of Missouri in Columbia, Missouri and graduated in 2001. Following her collegiate career, she was selected 15th overall in the 2001 WNBA draft by the Houston Comets. She has also played for the Seattle Storm and Minnesota Lynx.

== WNBA career statistics ==
Legend
GP	Games played	GS	Games started	MPG	Minutes per game	RPG	Rebounds per game
APG	Assists per game	SPG	Steals per game	BPG	Blocks per game	PPG	Points per game
TO	Turnovers per game	FG%	Field-goal percentage	3P%	3-point field-goal percentage	FT%	Free-throw percentage
**Bold**	Career best	°	League leader

=== WNBA ===
==== Regular season ====
Year	Team	GP	GS	MPG	FG%	3P%	FT%	RPG	APG	SPG	BPG	TO	PPG
2001	Houston	32	18	19.2	.367	**.388**	.667	3.4	1.1	0.5	0.7	1.1	4.3
2002	Houston	6	0	7.7	.000	.000	.500	1.0	0.3	0.3	0.3	0.3	0.2
2002	Seattle	24	22	23.1	.362	.303	.706	2.6	**2.3**	1.1	**0.8**	2.0	5.3
2003	Seattle	32	18	22.9	**.385**	.329	.633	**3.5**	1.3	0.8	**0.8**	1.3	5.1
2004	Minnesota	**33**	12	17.1	.348	.303	.667	2.4	1.1	0.6	0.7	1.2	3.8
2005	Minnesota	31	3	12.5	.330	.333	.636	1.5	0.7	0.5	0.1	0.9	3.5
2006	Chicago	32	**29**	**24.4**	.366	.329	**.710**	2.8	2.0	**1.3**	0.5	1.8	**8.0**
Career	6 years, 4 teams	190	102	19.4	.358	.326	.670	2.7	1.4	0.8	0.6	1.3	4.8

==== Playoffs ====
Year	Team	GP	GS	MPG	FG%	3P%	FT%	RPG	APG	SPG	BPG	TO	PPG
2001	Houston	**2**	0	**27.0**	**.438**	.333	**1.000**	**4.5**	0.0	0.0	**1.5**	1.0	**9.5**
2002	Seattle	**2**	**2**	23.0	.267	.222	.000	3.5	**2.0**	**1.5**	0.5	2.5	5.0
2004	Minnesota	**2**	0	15.0	.429	**.500**	.000	2.0	0.5	1.0	**1.5**	2.0	4.5
Career	3 years, 3 teams	6	2	21.7	.429	.500	.000	2.0	0.5	1.0	1.5	2.0	4.5

=== College ===
Year	Team	GP	GS	MPG	FG%	3P%	FT%	RPG	APG	SPG	BPG	TO	PPG
1999–00	Missouri	30	-	-	41.8	**36.8**	**76.8**	5.6	**3.3**	2.9	**2.3**	-	13.9
2000–01	Missouri	**32**	-	-	**42.0**	34.8	71.1	**6.2**	2.3	**3.1**	2.0	-	**19.1**
**Career**		62	-	-	41.9	35.5	73.5	5.9	2.8	3.0	2.1	-	16.6
Statistics retrieved from Sports-Reference.
