= Katie Cronin =

American basketball player (born 1977)

Personal information
- Born: September 8, 1977 (age 49) Denver, Colorado
- Listed height: 6 ft 0 in (1.83 m)

Career information
- High school: Horizon (Thornton, Colorado)
- College: Colorado State (1995–1999)
- WNBA draft: 1999: undrafted
- Playing career: 1999–2007
- Position: Guard/forward
- Number: 33
- Coaching career: 2001–2003

Career history

Playing
- 2004-2006: Colorado Chill
- 2006: Chicago Sky

Coaching
- 2001-2002: Seton Hall (assistant)
- 2002-2003: Santa Clara (assistant)

Career highlights
- 3x All-WAC (1997–1999); Colorado Sportswoman of the Year (1999); WAC All-Freshman Team (1996)
- Stats at Basketball Reference

Katie Cronin (born September 9, 1977) is a former American professional basketball player and coach who played one season in the WNBA for the Chicago Sky. She played college basketball at Colorado State. She also spent 2 years coaching as an assistant for Seton Hall and Santa Clara.

== College career ==
Cronin attended Colorado State from 1995 to 1999. She verbally committed to play for the Rams on the same day that she was invited to visit and tour their campus. She stated " I can't explain why, but I just knew it was the right thing to do...It turned out to be the best and most important decision of my life." Cronin teamed up to play with Becky Hammon and provide the Rams a winning combination for her entire four years.

During her time at CSU, Cronin and the Rams went 104-21 and won 2 WAC Division Championships, 1 WAC Championship, and went to the NCAA Tournament for 3 years. Cronin was named a first team All-WAC member three consecutive years. She was also named to two honorable mention Kodak All-American teams in 1998 and 1999, along with being named an honorable mention for the 1999 AP All-American team. During her season season, Cronin averaged 14.8 points and 7.2 rebounds a game.

Cronin was inducted in the Colorado State Hall of Fame in 2010.

== Professional career ==
Following her career at Colorado State, Cronin went on to play overseas in Israel, Germany, and Portugal. She retired from playing following her season in Portugal, stating "“I knew it was time... I got tired of living out of a suitcase, and I missed being home.”

=== Colorado Chill ===
Cronin also signed to play for the Colorado Chill of the National Women's Basketball League in 2003. She reunited with former Colorado State players Becky Hammon and Angie Gorton-Nelp. During her 3 seasons, Cronin and the Chill won 2 league championships.

=== WNBA ===
Cronin attended the training camps for the Seattle Storm (2002), New York Liberty (2004), San Antonio Silver Stars (2005, and the Connecticut Sun (2006), but was waived from all of them.

==== Chicago Sky ====
During the 2006 season for the Chicago Sky, Cronin signed on July 5 to a 7-Day Contract. She later was signed to a rest of season contract with them. She appeared in 11 games for the Sky and averaged 2.2 points for the season.

== Career statistics ==
=== WNBA ===
Legend
GP	Games played	GS	Games started	MPG	Minutes per game	RPG	Rebounds per game
APG	Assists per game	SPG	Steals per game	BPG	Blocks per game	PPG	Points per game
TO	Turnovers per game	FG%	Field-goal percentage	3P%	3-point field-goal percentage	FT%	Free-throw percentage
**Bold**	Career best	°	League leader

==== Regular season ====
Year	Team	GP	GS	MPG	FG%	3P%	FT%	RPG	APG	SPG	BPG	TO	PPG
2006	Chicago	11	0	12.1	.300	.308	.286	1.1	0.2	0.5	0.2	1.0	2.2
Career	1 year, 1 team	11	0	12.1	.300	.308	.286	1.1	0.2	0.5	0.2	1.0	2.2

=== College ===
Year	Team	GP	GS	MPG	FG%	3P%	FT%	RPG	APG	SPG	BPG	TO	PPG
1995–96	Colorado State	31	-	-	45.8	36.0	68.4	6.1	1.6	1.7	0.3	-	11.4
1996–97	Colorado State	28	-	-	43.5	33.8	**81.6**	5.8	1.9	**2.1**	0.5	-	16.1
1997–98	Colorado State	30	-	-	**47.6**	**38.4**	75.3	**8.2**	**3.2**	1.9	**0.6**	-	**18.2**
1998–99	Colorado State	**36**	-	-	47.2	35.3	79.4	7.2	2.7	1.8	0.6	-	14.8
**Career**		125	-	-	46.1	35.9	76.6	6.9	2.4	1.9	0.5	-	15.0
Statistics retrieved from Sports-Reference.

== Coaching career ==
While she was doing her professional playing career, Cronin became an assistant coach for the Seton Hall women's basketball team in 2000. After one season with the Pirates, Cronin moved to Santa Clara where she also spent one season.

== Personal life ==
Katie's brother is Portland Trail Blazers' general manager, Joe Cronin.
