= Bernadette Ngoyisa =

Democratic Republic of the Congo basketball player

Bernadette Ngoyisa Mudju
Personal information
- Born: August 26, 1982 (age 44) Kinshasa, Democratic Republic of the Congo
- Listed height: 193 cm (6 ft 4 in)

Career information
- Playing career: 2001–2020
- Position: Center

Career history
- 2001-2002: BC Namur-Capitale
- 2002: New York Liberty
- 2002-2004: Villeneuve-d'Ascq
- 2004-2005: Polisportiva Ares Ribera
- 2005: San Antonio Silver Stars
- 2005-2006: Bourges Basket
- 2006: Chicago Sky
- 2006-2008; 2009-2010: Famila Schio
- 2008: Indiana Fever
- 2008-2009: Union Hainaut Basket
- 2010-2013: Nantes-Rezé Basket 44
- 2014-2020: Roche Vendée Basket Club

Career highlights
- EuroCup champion (2008)
- Stats at Basketball Reference

Bernadette Ngoyisa Mudju (born 26 August 1982 in Kinshasa) is a professional women's basketball center with the Indiana Fever of the WNBA. Ngoyisa is from the Democratic Republic of the Congo. She was drafted with the 11th pick in the 2006 WNBA Expansion draft by the Sky from the San Antonio Silver Stars, where she played in 2005. During the 2006 season, Ngoyisa started 23 games and averaged 10.6 points per game and 5.7 rebounds per game.

On May 13, 2008, Ngoyisa was traded to the Indiana Fever.

She started playing for Union Hainaut in France during the 2008-09 WNBA off-season, and did not return to the WNBA afterward.

== Career statistics ==
Legend
GP	Games played	GS	Games started	MPG	Minutes per game	RPG	Rebounds per game
APG	Assists per game	SPG	Steals per game	BPG	Blocks per game	PPG	Points per game
TO	Turnovers per game	FG%	Field-goal percentage	3P%	3-point field-goal percentage	FT%	Free-throw percentage
**Bold**	Career best	°	League leader

=== WNBA ===
==== Regular season ====
WNBA regular season statistics
Year	Team	GP	GS	MPG	FG%	3P%	FT%	RPG	APG	SPG	BPG	TO	PPG
2002	New York	7	0	1.7	**.600**	—	—	0.7	0.0	0.0	**0.3**	**0.0**	0.9
2003	Did not play (waived)												
2004	Did not appear in league												
2005	San Antonio	26	0	9.7	.568	—	**.731**	2.3	0.2	0.2	0.1	1.0	4.3
2006	Chicago	30	**23**	**20.9**	.528	—	.592	**5.7**	**0.9**	**0.5**	0.2	2.0	**10.1**
2007	Did not appear in league												
2008	Indiana	**31**	1	7.3	.476	—	.719	1.7	0.2	0.2	0.2	1.0	2.7
**Career**	4 years, 4 teams	94	24	11.9	.529	—	.641	3.1	0.4	0.3	0.2	1.2	5.3

==== Playoffs ====
WNBA playoff statistics
Year	Team	GP	GS	MPG	FG%	3P%	FT%	RPG	APG	SPG	BPG	TO	PPG
2002	New York	**3**	0	**3.3**	**.600**	—	**.400**	**1.0**	0.0	0.0	0.0	**0.3**	**2.7**
2008	Indiana	1	0	2.0	—	—	—	**1.0**	0.0	0.0	0.0	1.0	0.0
**Career**	2 years, 2 teams	4	0	3.0	.600	—	.400	1.0	0.0	0.0	0.0	0.5	2.0
