= Deanna Jackson =

American basketball player (born 1979)

Personal information
- Born: December 15, 1979 (age 46) Selma, Alabama, U.S.
- Listed height: 6 ft 2 in (1.88 m)
- Listed weight: 155 lb (70 kg)

Career information
- High school: T. R. Miller (Brewton, Alabama)
- College: UAB (1998–2002)
- WNBA draft: 2002: 1st round, 8th overall pick
- Drafted by: Cleveland Rockers
- Position: Forward

Career history
- 2002–2003: Cleveland Rockers
- 2004–2005: Indiana Fever
- 2006: Chicago Sky

Career highlights
- Third-team All-American – AP (2001); CUSA Player of the Year (2001); First-team All-CUSA (2000, 2001); CUSA Freshman of the Year (1999); CUSA All-Freshman Team (1999)
- Stats at Basketball Reference
Medals
Women's Basketball
Representing United States
Jones Cup
Gold medal – first place	2000 Taipei	Team competition

Deanna Jackson (born December 15, 1979) is an American professional women's basketball player. Jackson attended college at the University of Alabama at Birmingham. She competed with USA Basketball as a member of the 2000 Jones Cup Team that won the Gold in Taipei.

== Career statistics ==
Legend
GP	Games played	GS	Games started	MPG	Minutes per game	RPG	Rebounds per game
APG	Assists per game	SPG	Steals per game	BPG	Blocks per game	PPG	Points per game
TO	Turnovers per game	FG%	Field-goal percentage	3P%	3-point field-goal percentage	FT%	Free-throw percentage
**Bold**	Career best	°	League leader

=== WNBA ===
==== Regular season ====
WNBA regular season statistics
Year	Team	GP	GS	MPG	FG%	3P%	FT%	RPG	APG	SPG	BPG	TO	PPG
2002	Cleveland	18	0	7.9	41.3	0.0	70.8	1.5	0.3	0.1	0.1	**0.5**	3.1
2003	Cleveland	**34**	22	22.4	**41.9**	**41.4**	71.4	2.6	1.5	0.6	**0.4**	1.0	**7.2**
2004	Indiana	34	**32**	**23.6**	36.7	0.0	71.2	**3.3**	**1.6**	**0.9**	0.2	1.5	6.9
2005	Indiana	34	0	13.9	40.3	0.0	**73.5**	2.3	0.7	0.5	**0.4**	0.9	4.8
2006	Chicago	22	1	15.0	39.5	33.3	64.7	3.0	0.6	0.4	0.1	1.0	6.0
**Career**	5 years, 3 teams	142	55	17.7	39.4	33.0	70.6	2.6	1.0	0.5	0.2	1.0	5.8

==== Playoffs ====
WNBA playoff statistics
Year	Team	GP	GS	MPG	FG%	3P%	FT%	RPG	APG	SPG	BPG	TO	PPG
2003	Cleveland	3	**3**	20.0	20.0	0.0	66.7	**4.0**	**0.7**	**0.7**	0.0	**0.0**	4.0
2005	Indiana	**4**	0	**21.0**	**43.5**	**100.0**	**82.4**	3.5	0.5	0.5	**0.5**	0.3	**8.8**
**Career**	2 years, 2 teams	7	3	20.6	32.6	33.3	78.3	3.7	0.6	0.6	0.3	0.1	6.7

=== College ===
NCAA statistics
Year	Team	GP	Points	FG%	3P%	FT%	RPG	APG	SPG	BPG	PPG
1998–99	UAB	27	452	51.6	27.7	71.2	8.9	0.7	1.4	**1.4**	16.7
1999-00	UAB	**33**	627	47.7	34.1	64.2	11.7	1.3	1.4	1.2	19.0
2000–01	UAB	31	**777**	47.6	**39.8**	**74.4**	11.5	2.0	1.7	1.2	25.1
2001–02	UAB	11	288	**53.3**	25.6	73.6	**12.3**	**4.7**	**2.4**	1.1	**26.2**
**Career**		102	2144	49.1	33.8	71.1	11.0	1.7	1.6	1.2	21.0
