= Liz Moeggenberg =

American basketball player (born 1984)

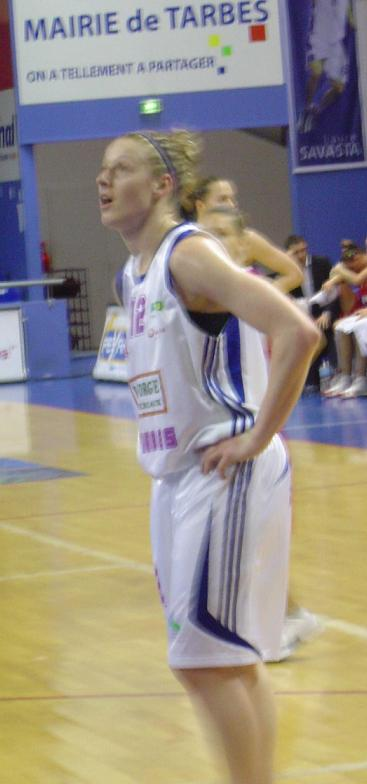

Personal information
- Born: May 25, 1984 (age 42) Empire, Michigan
- Listed height: 6 ft 1 in (1.85 m)
- Listed weight: 195 lb (88 kg)

Career information
- High school: Glen Lake (Maple City, Michigan)
- College: Michigan State (2002–2006)
- WNBA draft: 2006: 2nd round, 18th overall pick
- Drafted by: Phoenix Mercury
- Position: Forward

Career history
- 2006–2007: Chicago Sky
- 2007: ASPTT Arras
- 2007–2009: Tarbes GB

Career highlights
- First-team All-Big Ten (2006); Big Ten Freshman of the Year (2003); Big Ten All-Freshman Team (2003); Michigan Miss Basketball (2001)
- Stats at Basketball Reference
Medals
Women's basketball
Representing the USA
World University Games
Gold medal – first place	2005 Izmir	Team

Elizabeth Ann Moeggenberg (born Shimek May 25, 1984 in Empire, Michigan) was drafted by the Phoenix Mercury of the WNBA, was then traded to the Houston Comets and then weeks later traded to the Chicago Sky where she played for two seasons.

Shimek attended college at Michigan State University and graduated in 2006. Following her collegiate career, she was selected 18th overall in the 2006 WNBA draft.

She married Lucas Moeggenberg in October 2006. The couple has three sons.

In 2012, Liz Shimek Moeggenberg returned to her alma mater, and now coaches the Glen Lake girls junior varsity basketball team, the Lakers.

== Career statistics ==
Legend
GP	Games played	GS	Games started	MPG	Minutes per game	RPG	Rebounds per game
APG	Assists per game	SPG	Steals per game	BPG	Blocks per game	PPG	Points per game
TO	Turnovers per game	FG%	Field-goal percentage	3P%	3-point field-goal percentage	FT%	Free-throw percentage
**Bold**	Career best	°	League leader

=== WNBA ===
==== Regular season ====
Year	Team	GP	GS	MPG	FG%	3P%	FT%	RPG	APG	SPG	BPG	TO	PPG
2006	Chicago	**27**	**1**	**10.1**	31.7	**33.3**	**46.7**	**1.7**	**0.6**	**0.4**	**0.2**	0.6	**2.1**
2007	Chicago	23	0	9.0	**41.5**	16.7	40.0	1.3	0.3	0.1	0.1	**0.4**	1.6
Career	2 years, 1 team	50	1	9.6	35.6	27.8	45.7	1.5	0.5	0.3	0.2	0.5	1.9

=== College ===
Legend
GP	Games played	GS	Games started	MPG	Minutes per game
FG%	Field goal percentage	3P%	3-point field goal percentage	FT%	Free throw percentage
RPG	Rebounds per game	APG	Assists per game	SPG	Steals per game
BPG	Blocks per game	PPG	Points per game	**Bold**	Career high

Year	Team	GP	Points	FG%	3P%	FT%	RPG	APG	SPG	BPG	PPG
2002-03	Michigan State	29	302	46.2	-	75.6	**9.1**	1.0	1.2	0.4	10.4
2003-04	Michigan State	31	335	46.5	**40.4**	69.4	8.1	1.0	1.2	1.0	10.8
2004-05	Michigan State	**37**	546	50.1	31.3	73.5	**9.1**	**2.0**	**1.4**	**1.2**	14.8
2005-06	Michigan State	34	**597**	**54.1**	28.9	**83.0**	8.2	**2.0**	**1.4**	0.6	**17.6**
Career	Michigan State	131	1780	50.0	33.3	75.8	8.6	1.5	1.3	0.8	13.6

== WNBA career ==
Moeggenberg played two seasons for the Chicago Sky (2006, 2007).

== USA Basketball ==
Moeggenberg was a member of the team representing the US at the 2005 World University Games Team in Izmir, Turkey. In the game against China, she led her team in scoring with 23 points. In the semi-final against Russia, she led the team with 25 points, helping the team win 118–67. Moeggenberg averaged 7.3 points per game, and 6.6 rebounds, second best on the team while helping the team to a 7–0 record, resulting in a gold medal at the event.

== Overseas career ==
Seasons	Team	Country
2007	ASPTT Arras	France
2007–2009	Tarbes GB	France
