= Steven Key =

American basketball player-coach (born 1968)

Eisbären Bremerhaven
- Position: Head coach
- League: ProA

Personal information
- Born: May 14, 1968 (age 58) Los Angeles, California

Career information
- High school: Atholton (Columbia, Maryland)
- College: Boston University (1986–1990)
- NBA draft: 1990: undrafted
- Coaching career: 2006–present

Career history

Playing
- 1990–1991: San Jose Jammers
- 1991–1992: Klosterneuburg Dukes
- 1992–1993: Tigers Tübingen
- 1993–1994: BBC Bayreuth
- 1995: Gold Coast Rollers
- 1996–1999: Dragons Rhöndorf
- 1999: Étendard de Brest
- 2000: SG Braunschweig
- 2000–2001: BSG Ludwigsburg

Coaching
- 2003–2006: Düsseldorf Magics
- 2006–2007: Chicago Sky (assistant)
- 2008–2010: Chicago Sky
- 2011: Gießen 46ers
- 2011–2013: MHP Riesen Ludwigsburg
- 2014: Connecticut Sun (assistant)
- 2014–2015: Licher BasketBären
- 2015–2017: Gießen 46ers (assistant)
- 2016–2017: Indiana Fever (assistant)
- 2018–2022: S.Oliver Würzburg (assistant)
- 2022–present: Eisbären Bremerhaven

Steven Key (born May 14, 1968) is an American professional basketball coach and former professional player.

== Career ==
Key attended Atholton High School in Columbia, Maryland, and was named the 1986 Howard County Player of the Year.

He was a four-year letter winner at Boston University (1986–90), garnering America East Conference Player of the Year honors in 1990. He also received the Lou Cohen Award as BU's Most Valuable Player the same year. In 1990, Key was close to making the roster of the Los Angeles Clippers and then played for the San Jose Jammers in the 1990–91 Continental Basketball Association (CBA) season, before taking his game overseas. He went on to play until 2002 with stints in Austria (BK Klosterneuburg), Australia (Gold Coast Rollers), Germany (SV Tübingen, Steiner Bayreuth, Rhöndorfer TV, BSG Ludwigsburg, SG Braunschweig) and France (Étendard de Brest, Saint Quentin). He made three appearances in the German Bundesliga All-Star Game during his professional career.

Key began his coaching career as head coach of the Düsseldorf Magics in the German second-tier league 2. Bundesliga. After three years at the Düsseldorf helm (2003–2006), he served as assistant coach of Chicago Sky in the WNBA in 2006 and 2007. In 2008, Key was promoted to head coach and general manager of the Sky organization. He resigned in September 2010.

In January 2011, he became head coach of the Gießen 46ers in the German Basketball Bundesliga. In June 2011, he left Gießen for fellow Bundesliga side Neckar Riesen Ludwigsburg, where he served as an assistant coach, before being promoted to the head coaching position in December 2011. He was relieved of his duties in January 2013.

In February 2014, Key was hired as an assistant coach by the Connecticut Sun of the WNBA, but returned to Germany for the 2014–15 season to take over the head coaching job at ProB outfit Licher BasketBären. After one year at the helm, he was appointed assistant coach of the Gießen 46ers in 2015. In between the seasons in Germany, he served an assistant coach of the Indiana Fever of the Women's National Basketball Association (WNBA) in 2016 and 2017.

In May 2018, Key was named assistant coach of German Bundesliga club S.Oliver Würzburg.

On June 3, 2022, Key signed as head coach with Eisbären Bremerhaven of the German ProA.

== Head coaching record ==
=== WNBA ===
Team	Year	G	W	L	W–L%	Finish	PG	PW	PL	PW–L%	Result
Chicago	2008	34	12	22	.353	5th in Western	—	—	—	—	Missed playoffs
Chicago	2009	34	16	18	.471	T–4th in Western	—	—	—	—	Missed playoffs
Chicago	2010	34	14	20	.412	6th in Western	—	—	—	—	Missed playoffs
Career		102	42	60	.412		—	—	—	—	
