= 2006 Houston Comets season =

- Head coach: Van Chancellor
- Arena: Toyota Center

Results
- Record: 18–16 (.529)
- Place: 3rd (Western)
- Playoff finish: Lost first round (2-0) to Sacramento Monarchs

The 2006 WNBA season was the tenth season for the Houston Comets. The Comets qualified for the WNBA Playoffs for the 9th and last time in franchise history. It would also be the end of Van Chancellor's tenure as head coach of the Comets.

== Offseason ==
Kiesha Brown was picked up by the Chicago Sky in the WNBA Expansion Draft.

=== WNBA draft ===
| Round | Pick | Player | Nationality | College/School/Team |
|---|---|---|---|---|
| 2 | 15 | *Ann Strother (G) | United States | Connecticut |
| 2 | 24 | Renae Camino | Australia | - |
| 3 | 29 | Tiffany Stansbury (F/C) | United States | North Carolina State |

- Ann Strother was later traded to the Phoenix Mercury.

NOTE: The Comets received Liz Shimek and Mistie Williams from the Mercury during the draft.

== Regular season ==
=== Season standings ===
| Western Conference | W | L | PCT | GB | Home | Road | Conf. |
|---|---|---|---|---|---|---|---|
| Los Angeles Sparks ^{x} | 25 | 9 | .735 | – | 15–2 | 10–7 | 15–5 |
| Sacramento Monarchs ^{x} | 21 | 13 | .618 | 4.0 | 14–3 | 7–10 | 10–10 |
| Houston Comets ^{x} | 18 | 16 | .529 | 7.0 | 12–5 | 6–11 | 11–9 |
| Seattle Storm ^{x} | 18 | 16 | .529 | 7.0 | 9–8 | 9–8 | 10–10 |
| Phoenix Mercury ^{o} | 18 | 16 | .529 | 7.0 | 10–7 | 8–9 | 8–12 |
| San Antonio Silver Stars ^{o} | 13 | 21 | .382 | 12.0 | 6–11 | 7–10 | 10–10 |
| Minnesota Lynx ^{o} | 10 | 24 | .294 | 15.0 | 8–9 | 2–15 | 6–14 |

=== Season schedule ===
| Date | Opponent | Score | Result | Record |
|---|---|---|---|---|
| May 21 | San Antonio | 63-79 | Loss | 0-1 |
| May 23 | @ Seattle | 84-59 | Win | 1-1 |
| May 25 | @ Sacramento | 81-66 | Win | 2-1 |
| May 31 | Indiana | 73-60 | Win | 3-1 |
| June 2 | Chicago | 71-60 | Win | 4-1 |
| June 4 | Minnesota | 85-62 | Win | 5-1 |
| June 6 | @ Washington | 79-93 | Loss | 5-2 |
| June 9 | New York | 97-62 | Win | 6-2 |
| June 11 | @ Minnesota | 62-75 | Loss | 6-3 |
| June 14 | Sacramento | 73-66 (OT) | Win | 7-3 |
| June 16 | @ New York | 72-58 | Win | 8-3 |
| June 17 | @ Detroit | 55-71 | Loss | 8-4 |
| June 21 | @ Los Angeles | 55-75 | Loss | 8-5 |
| June 23 | Charlotte | 85-70 | Win | 9-5 |
| June 25 | Seattle | 84-74 | Win | 10-5 |
| June 27 | @ Connecticut | 57-73 | Loss | 10-6 |
| June 29 | Washington | 83-76 | Win | 11-6 |
| July 2 | Sacramento | 77-62 | Win | 12-6 |
| July 5 | @ Los Angeles | 62-74 | Loss | 12-7 |
| July 7 | @ San Antonio | 75-94 | Loss | 12-8 |
| July 9 | Detroit | 60-66 | Loss | 12-9 |
| July 14 | @ Chicago | 82-77 | Win | 13-9 |
| July 16 | @ Indiana | 56-60 | Loss | 13-10 |
| July 18 | @ San Antonio | 64-67 | Loss | 13-11 |
| July 20 | Minnesota | 78-55 | Win | 14-11 |
| July 25 | Los Angeles | 52-56 | Loss | 14-12 |
| July 27 | Phoenix | 98-95 | Win | 15-12 |
| July 30 | @ Phoenix | 82-80 | Win | 16-12 |
| August 1 | @ Sacramento | 62-74 | Loss | 16-13 |
| August 4 | @ Minnesota | 77-73 (OT) | Win | 17-13 |
| August 6 | Connecticut | 67-86 | Loss | 17-14 |
| August 8 | @ Charlotte | 57-68 | Loss | 17-15 |
| August 10 | Phoenix | 110-111 (3OT) | Loss | 17-16 |
| August 12 | Seattle | 89-72 | Win | 18-16 |
| August 17 (first round, G1) | Sacramento | 78-93 | Loss | 0-1 |
| August 19 (first round, G2) | @ Sacramento | 64-92 | Loss | 0-2 |

== Player stats ==
| Player | Games played | Rebounds | Assists | Steals | Blocks | Points |
|---|---|---|---|---|---|---|
| Sheryl Swoopes | 31 | 183 | 115 | 64 | 9 | 482 |
| Michelle Snow | 34 | 269 | 47 | 33 | 38 | 442 |
| Tina Thompson | 21 | 118 | 47 | 20 | 13 | 392 |
| Dawn Staley | 34 | 75 | 133 | 35 | 5 | 250 |
| Roneeka Hodges | 33 | 65 | 32 | 16 | 4 | 247 |
| Dominique Canty | 15 | 52 | 44 | 17 | 0 | 164 |
| Tamecka Dixon | 23 | 60 | 54 | 13 | 2 | 162 |
| Sancho Lyttle | 29 | 114 | 8 | 25 | 4 | 106 |
| Mistie Williams | 27 | 64 | 16 | 11 | 3 | 79 |
| Anastasia Kostaki | 32 | 25 | 19 | 7 | 0 | 67 |
| Tari Phillips | 21 | 47 | 4 | 9 | 5 | 59 |
| Astou Ndiaye-Diatta | 11 | 30 | 8 | 1 | 1 | 35 |
| Kayte Christensen | 6 | 19 | 4 | 0 | 0 | 18 |
| Edwina Brown | 4 | 4 | 1 | 1 | 0 | 4 |
