= Michael Alter =

American businessman

- Education: Harvard University
- Occupations: Businessman and real estate developer
- Known for: Owner of the Chicago Sky

Michael Alter is an American businessman who is the president and owner of the Alter Group, a commercial real estate developer, and majority owner of the Chicago Sky Women's National Basketball Association team.

== Career ==
Alter is a founder and on the board of City Year Chicago, whose signature program is the City Year Youth Service Corps. The goal in the program is to bring together approximately 1,000 people ranging in age from 17–24 from diverse backgrounds and put them through a full-time commitment of a year of community service, leadership development, and civic engagement where they mentor children.

In 2005, he became the principal owner and chairman of the WNBA team: the Chicago Sky.

In 2009, he was part of an investment team that purchased The New Republic, one of the nation's oldest political and cultural magazines.

In 2021, he was sanctioned by the city of Chicago's ethics board for unregistered lobbying of Mayor Lori Lightfoot, and paid a $5000 fine.

== Education ==
Alter graduated from New Trier West in 1979 before attending Harvard. Alter has a Bachelor of Arts degree in government from Harvard University and a J.D. degree from the University of Chicago Law School. He and his wife Ellen are parents of three children. They live in Winnetka, Illinois.
