= Jia Perkins =

American basketball player and coach (born 1982)

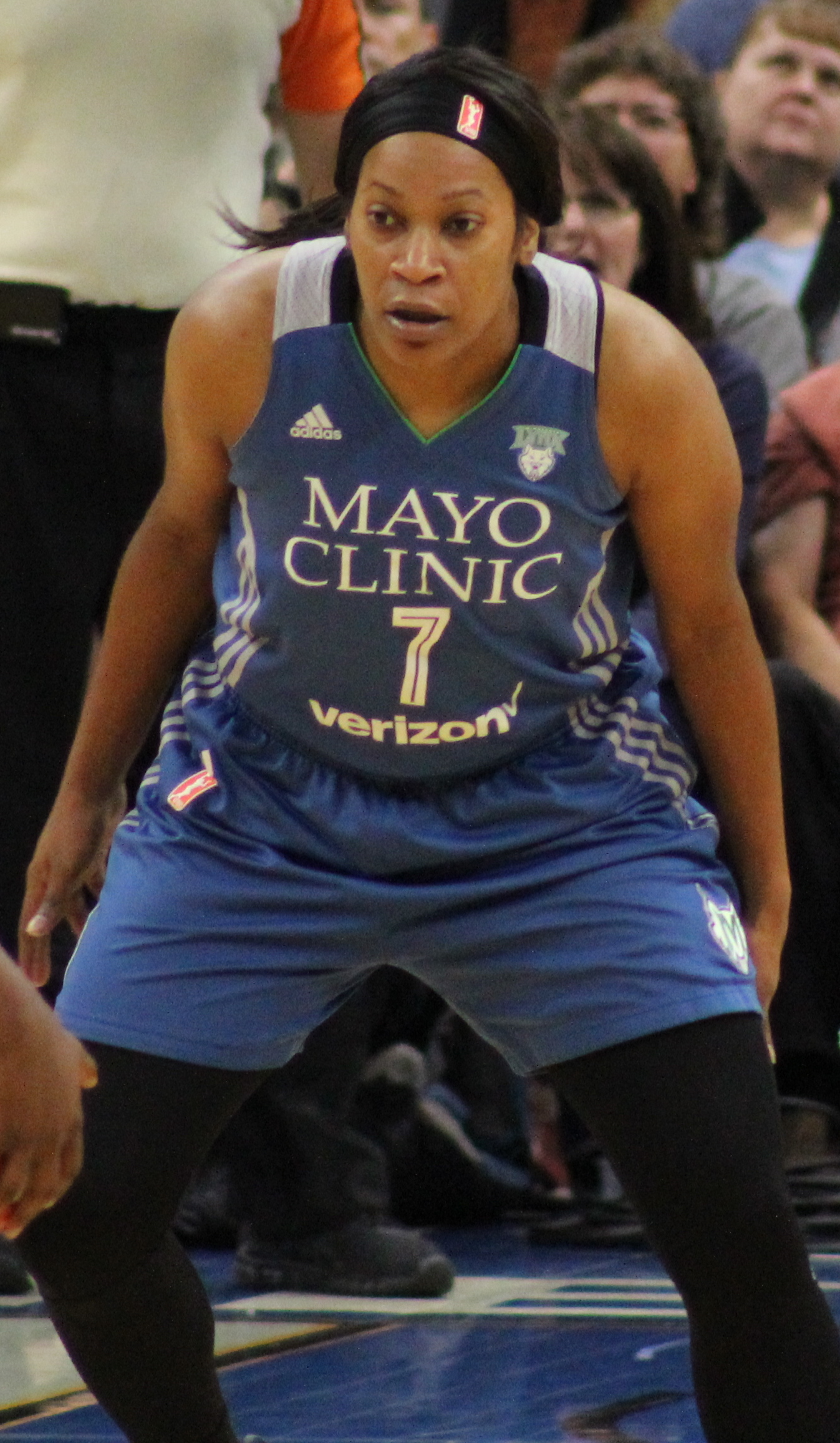

Salt Lake City Stars
- Title: Assistant coach
- League: NBA G League

Personal information
- Born: February 23, 1982 (age 44) Newburgh, New York, U.S.
- Listed height: 5 ft 8 in (1.73 m)
- Listed weight: 165 lb (75 kg)

Career information
- High school: Granbury (Granbury, Texas)
- College: Texas Tech (2000–2004)
- WNBA draft: 2004: 3rd round, 35th overall pick
- Drafted by: Charlotte Sting
- Playing career: 2004–2017
- Position: Shooting guard

Career history

Playing
- 2004–2005: Charlotte Sting
- 2006–2010: Chicago Sky
- 2007–2008: Electra Ramat-Hasharon
- 2009–2010: Galatasaray
- 2011–2015: San Antonio Stars
- 2016–2017: Minnesota Lynx

Coaching
- 2019–2023: Cal State Los Angeles Lady Golden Eagles (assistant)
- 2023–present: Salt Lake City Stars (assistant)

Career highlights
- WNBA champion (2017); WNBA All-Star (2009); WNBA All-Defensive Second Team (2013); First-team All-Big 12 (2003)
- Stats at WNBA.com
- Stats at Basketball Reference

Jia Dorene Perkins (born February 23, 1982) is an American retired professional basketball player currently working as an assistant coach for the Salt Lake City Stars of the NBA G League. She announced her retirement after the 2017 season when the Lynx won the WNBA championship. She was born in Newburgh, New York. She moved to Granbury, Texas, where she attended Granbury High School.

== College career ==
=== College statistics ===
Legend
GP	Games played	GS	Games started	MPG	Minutes per game
FG%	Field goal percentage	3P%	3-point field goal percentage	FT%	Free throw percentage
RPG	Rebounds per game	APG	Assists per game	SPG	Steals per game
BPG	Blocks per game	PPG	Points per game	**Bold**	Career high

Year	Team	GP	Points	FG%	3P%	FT%	RPG	APG	SPG	BPG	PPG
2000–01	Texas Tech	32	435	45.8	36.4	80.5	4.1	**3.8**	**2.8**	0.5	13.6
2001–02	Texas Tech	32	513	42.6	23.3	77.5	5.0	3.8	2.7	0.8	16.0
2002–03	Texas Tech	**35**	**556**	43.0	5.3	78.0	**5.1**	2.8	2.6	**0.8**	15.9
2003–04	Texas Tech	16	264	**50.2**	**42.1**	**80.8**	4.4	2.1	2.3	0.8	**16.5**
Career	Texas Tech	115	1768	44.4	28.2	79.2	4.7	3.3	2.7	0.7	15.4

=== 2000–2001 ===
Jia helped Texas Tech to get to March Madness, as Texas Tech claimed the 2nd seed. Texas Tech went all the way to the regional semifinals, beating 15th seeded Penn State and 7th seeded Virginia Tech. However, in the regional semifinals, Texas Tech lost 74-72 to Purdue, who went all the way to the National Championship before losing to Notre Dame.

=== 2001–2002 ===
Despite being seeded in a lesser position, Texas Tech still managed to surge their way through to the Sweet Sixteen round again as the 4th seed team in the West Region's bracket. Texas tech beat 13th seeded Stephen F. Austin in the 1st round, then went on to beat 12th seeded Mississippi State. However, Texas Tech came to the same end as they did in 2001, losing by 10 points to 1st-seeded Oklahoma, who also went on to lose in the Championship.

=== 2002–2003 ===
Texas Tech looked to overcome their Sweet Sixteen losing streak, and this year they were the 2nd-seeded team again. Texas Tech started off a bit shaky, beating 15th-seeded Missouri State by only 8 points. However, they redeemed themselves in the 2nd round, winning 71-48 over UC Santa Barbara. They went on to beat New Mexico by the same score, advancing to the Elite Eight for the first (and last) time in Jia's college era. Texas Tech went on to lose to Duke.

=== 2003–2004 ===
In Jia's last year at Texas Tech, Jia played her fewest ever games in her college career, only playing 16 total games. That being said, Texas Tech also was eliminated in the earliest stage of Jia's college career. Texas Tech finished 4th seeded again, and beat Maine in the 1st round. They went on to lose by 17 points to Louisiana Tech. Jia never did go to the Final Four tournament.

== WNBA career ==
Perkins was selected by the Charlotte Sting with the 35th pick in the 2004 WNBA draft. Perkins missed most of the season due to the birth of her daughter.

On November 16, 2005, Perkins was selected by the Chicago Sky in the expansion draft. She played in Chicago for five years and posted a career-best 17.0 points per game in 2008.

In 2009, Perkins was named to the Eastern Conference All-Star team as a reserve.

Prior to the 2011 season, she was traded to the San Antonio Stars in exchange for Michelle Snow. That same year, Perkins made her first playoff appearance.

During the 2016 WNBA draft, Perkins was traded to the Minnesota Lynx in exchange for Jazmon Gwathmey.

In February 2018, it was announced that Perkins had officially retired from the game of basketball.

=== WNBA playoffs ===
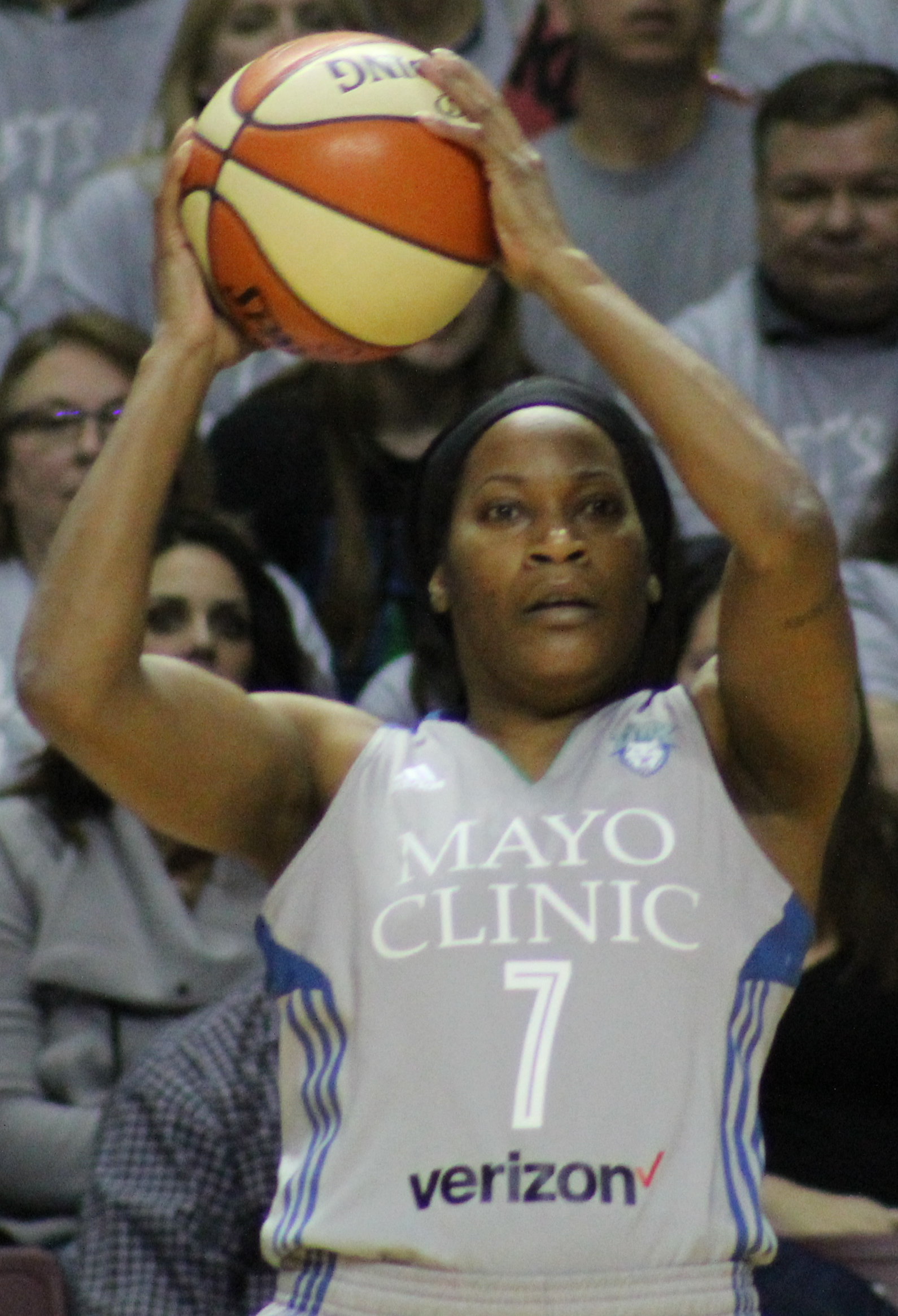
Perkins in game 5 of the WNBA Finals in 2017

The Silver Stars qualified for the 2011 WNBA Playoffs and Perkins made her first career postseason appearance in 2011, where the Stars lost in the first round to the Minnesota Lynx. Perkins scored the team's high of 24 points in the 2nd game of the series, played in San Antonio, where the Stars won 84-75.

The next year, the Stars made the 2012 WNBA Playoffs, where the Stars improved to the third seeded spot. However, their season came to an early end as the Los Angeles Sparks defeated them 2-0 in the 1st round.

The Stars missed the playoffs in 2013, but came back in 2014 as the third seed. However, they met the same sticky end that they did in 2012, losing 2-0 to the Lynx. Perkins has played in every playoff game the Stars have partaken in since 2011.

In her first season with the Lynx, they made it all the way to the WNBA Finals where the faced the Sparks. However, they Lynx ended up losing the series 2-3.

In her second season with the Lynx, they made it back to the Finals for the third straight season. This time the Lynx would win in 5 games against the Sparks, winning their fourth championship in seven seasons, tying the now-defunct Houston Comets for most championship titles.

== Coaching career ==
On September 20, 2023, Perkins joined the Salt Lake City Stars of the NBA G League as an assistant coach.

== WNBA career statistics ==
Legend
GP	Games played	GS	Games started	MPG	Minutes per game	RPG	Rebounds per game
APG	Assists per game	SPG	Steals per game	BPG	Blocks per game	PPG	Points per game
TO	Turnovers per game	FG%	Field-goal percentage	3P%	3-point field-goal percentage	FT%	Free-throw percentage
**Bold**	Career best	°	League leader

†	Denotes seasons in which Perkins won a WNBA championship

=== Regular season ===
Year	Team	GP	GS	MPG	FG%	3P%	FT%	RPG	APG	SPG	BPG	TO	PPG
2004	Charlotte	4	0	4.3	.000	.000	.750	0.8	0.3	0.8	0.0	**0.2**	0.8
2005	Charlotte	30	11	15.5	.424	.333	.633	1.5	1.1	1.0	0.3	1.0	5.0
2006	Chicago	30	27	28.0	.351	.277	.806	3.6	**3.2**	1.4	**0.4**	1.8	9.4
2007	Chicago	33	5	23.1	**.464**	**.433**	.774	3.3	2.3	1.5	0.2	1.5	11.7
2008	Chicago	**34**	**34**	**31.9**	.436	.363	**.891**	**4.0**	2.8	1.9	0.3	1.7	**17.0**
2009	Chicago	**34**	**34**	27.4	.417	.385	.846	3.4	2.9	**2.2**	0.2	1.6	13.2
2010	Chicago	**34**	**34**	27.5	.396	.349	.814	2.9	2.4	1.6	0.2	1.1	10.7
2011	San Antonio	**34**	8	25.1	.418	.313	.845	3.5	1.4	1.2	0.2	1.0	12.0
2012	San Antonio	33	3	23.0	.380	.386	.754	2.8	1.9	1.6	0.3	0.8	10.6
2013	San Antonio	**34**	33	30.5	.400	.388	.865	3.1	2.0	**2.3**	0.2	1.4	13.9
2014	San Antonio	23	2	22.6	.442	.411	**.895**	2.3	1.7	1.4	0.2	0.9	12.5
2015	San Antonio	26	26	27.3	.376	.272	.880	3.0	1.7	1.4	0.3	1.2	13.3
2016	Minnesota	**34**	5	20.7	.366	.228	.833	2.6	1.3	0.9	0.2	0.6	6.4
2017^{†}	Minnesota	**34**	2	16.3	.369	.316	.833	2.0	1.4	1.0	0.0	0.8	4.2
Career	14 years, 4 teams	417	224	24.4	.405	.351	.834	2.9	2.0	1.5	0.2	1.2	10.6

=== Postseason ===
Year	Team	GP	GS	MPG	FG%	3P%	FT%	RPG	APG	SPG	BPG	TO	PPG
2011	San Antonio	**3**	**3**	**33.7**	.395	.368	**1.000**	**5.3**	**2.7**	2.7	0.3	2.3	**13.0**
2012	San Antonio	2	0	21.5	.375	.333	.500	1.5	2.5	**3.0**	**0.5**	0.5	12.0
2014	San Antonio	2	0	23.0	**.625**	**.600**	.500	1.0	0.5	0.5	**0.5**	1.0	12.0
2016	Minnesota	**8**	0	17.6	.390	.100	**1.000**	2.0	1.9	0.5	0.1	**0.3**	5.1
2017^{†}	Minnesota	**8**	0	15.8	.333	.286	**1.000**	2.0	0.9	0.7	0.1	0.6	3.3
Career	5 years, 2 teams	23	3	19.9	.403	.316	.800	2.3	1.6	1.3	0.2	0.7	6.7

== Awards and achievements ==
- 2009 WNBA All-Star Selection
- Stars All-Decade Team All-Decade Team
