= 2006 Connecticut Sun season =

- Head coach: Mike Thibault
- Arena: Mohegan Sun Arena

Results
- Record: 26–8 (.765)
- Place: 1st (Eastern)
- Playoff finish: Lost in Eastern Conference Finals

The 2006 WNBA season was their eighth season and their fourth in Connecticut. The Sun attempted to return to the postseason for the fourth consecutive season and were successful. Before the season started, many thought the Sun would make their third consecutive trip to the WNBA Finals, but lost to the eventual champion Detroit Shock in 3 games.

== Offseason ==
=== WNBA draft ===
Round	Pick	Player	Nationality	School/team/country
2	28	Debbie Merrill	United States	Ohio State
3	42	Marita Payne	United States	Auburn

=== Transactions ===
- July 24: The Sun signed Jessica Brungo.
- July 13: The Sun signed Brooke Queenan.
- June 29: The Sun waived Ambrosia Anderson.
- May 19: The Sun waived Donna Loffhagen and Jennifer Derevjanik.
- May 16: The Sun waived Brooke Queenan.
- May 15: The Sun waived Monique Coker.
- May 13: The Sun waived Katie Cronin and Jessica Brungo.
- May 12: The Sun signed Brooke Queenan.
- May 11: The Sun signed Ambrosia Anderson.
- April 6: The Sun signed Katie Cronin.
- March 27: The Sun have agreed to terms with Erin Phillips.
- March 15: The Sun signed Monique Coker.
- March 1: The Sun resigned Jennifer Derevjanik.
- February 28: The Sun resigned Jamie Carey.
- February 27: The Sun resigned Laura Summerton and Le'Coe Willingham and signed Donna Loffhagen.
- February 10: The Sun resigned Asjha Jones.
- February 7: The Sun resigned Nykesha Sales.
- February 1: The Sun announced the signings of Megan Mahoney and Candace Futrell.

== Roster ==
2006 Connecticut Sun roster
Players
Coaches

Pos.	No.	Nat.	Name	Height	Weight	From
G	10	(United States)	Carey, Jamie	5' 6" (1.68m)	135 lb (61kg)	Texas
F	22	(United States)	Brungo, Jessica	6' 1" (1.85m)	165 lb (75kg)	Penn State
G/F	32	(United States)	Douglas, Katie (C)	6' 0" (1.83m)	165 lb (75kg)	Purdue
C	12	(Poland)	Dydek, Margo	7' 2" (2.18m)	223 lb (101kg)	Poland
G/F	21	(United States)	Hairston, Kamesha	6' 0" (1.83m)	146 lb (66kg)	Temple
F	15	(United States)	Jones, Asjha	6' 2" (1.88m)	196 lb (89kg)	Connecticut
G/F	24	(United States)	Mahoney, Megan	6' 0" (1.83m)	160 lb (73kg)	Kansas State
F/C	11	(United States)	McWilliams-Franklin, Taj	6' 2" (1.88m)	184 lb (83kg)	St. Edward's College
G	31	(Australia)	Phillips, Erin	5' 7" (1.7m)	162 lb (73kg)	Australia
F	2	(United States)	Queenan, Brooke	6' 2" (1.88m)	185 lb (84kg)	Boston University
G/F	42	(United States)	Sales, Nykesha (C)	6' 0" (1.83m)	175 lb (79kg)	Connecticut
C	14	(Australia)	Summerton, Laura	6' 2" (1.88m)	167 lb (76kg)	Australia
G	13	(United States)	Whalen, Lindsay	5' 8" (1.73m)	150 lb (68kg)	Minnesota
F	43	(United States)	Willingham, Le'Coe	6' 0" (1.83m)	200 lb (91kg)	Auburn

Head coach
(United States) Mike Thibault (Saint Martin's)
Assistant coaches
(United States) Scott Hawk (Nebraska-Omaha)
(United States) Bernadette Mattox (Georgia)
Athletic trainer
(United States) Jeremy Norman (Keene State)
Strength and conditioning coach
(United States) Lisa Ciaravella (Lynn)

Legend

- (C) Team captain
- (DP) Unsigned draft pick
- (FA) Free agent
- (S) Suspended
- Injured

== Season standings ==
Eastern Conference	W	L	PCT	GB	Home	Road	Conf.
z - Connecticut Sun	26	8	.765	–	14–3	12–5	15–5
x - Detroit Shock	23	11	.676	3.0	14–3	9–8	14–6
x - Indiana Fever	21	13	.618	5.0	12–5	9–8	12–8
x - Washington Mystics	18	16	.529	8.0	13–4	5–12	12–8
e - New York Liberty	11	23	.324	15.0	7–10	4–13	7–13
e - Charlotte Sting	11	23	.324	15.0	7–10	4–3	6–14
e - Chicago Sky	5	29	.147	21.0	3–14	2–15	4–16

== Schedule ==
=== Preseason ===
2006 Game Log: Preseason

Game	Date	Opponent	Score	High points	High rebounds	High assists	Location/Attendance	Record
1	May 7	Detroit	L 58-77	Carey (10)	Jones (8)	Phillips (6)	Mohegan Sun Arena; 7,272	0-1
2	May 9	@ Sacramento	L 73-74	Sales (19)	Jones (7)	N/A	University Arena; 6,392	0-2
3	May 13	@ Phoenix	W 96-85	Sales (30)	McWilliams-Franklin (9)	Douglas (4)	US Airways Center; 2,069	1-2

=== Regular season ===
2006 Game Log: Regular Season
May

Game	Date	Opponent	Score	High points	High rebounds	High assists	Location/Attendance	Record
1	May 20	New York	W 91-74	Sales (19)	Sales (10)	Whalen, Sales (5)	Mohegan Sun Arena; 8,316	1-0
2	May 23	@ Minnesota	W 81-69	Douglas (28)	McWilliams-Franklin (11)	Whalen (6)	Target Center; 9,471	2-0
3	May 27	Detroit	L 73-77 (OT)	Douglas (18)	McWilliams-Franklin, Douglas (7)	Whalen (5)	Mohegan Sun Arena; 6,738	2-1

June

Game	Date	Opponent	Score	High points	High rebounds	High assists	Location/Attendance	Record
4	June 1	@ Charlotte	W 89-65	Sales (18)	Dydek (15)	Douglas (5)	Charlotte Bobcats Arena; 3,632	3-1
5	June 3	Charlotte	W 89-71	Dydek (17)	McWilliams-Franklin (15)	Sales (5)	Mohegan Sun Arena; 7,318	4-1
6	June 7	@ New York	W 75-60	Douglas (17)	McWilliams-Franklin (7)	Sales, Phillips (4)	Madison Square Garden; 10,180	5-1
7	June 9	Seattle	W 85-81	Douglas (18)	Dydek (12)	Whalen (9)	Mohegan Sun Arena; 7,138	6-1
8	June 13	Washington	W 85-71	Douglas (26)	Douglas (7)	Whalen, Jones (4)	Mohegan Sun Arena; 6,339	7-1
9	June 16	@ Phoenix	L 86-91	Douglas (27)	McWilliams-Franklin (17)	Whalen (4)	US Airways Center; 6,378	7-2
10	June 17	@ Los Angeles	L 70-82	Jones (16)	Sales, Dydek, Jones (5)	Whalen (5)	STAPLES Center; 7,991	7-3
11	June 20	@ Charlotte	W 90-66	Sales (15)	McWilliams-Franklin (9)	Whalen (6)	Charlotte Bobcats Arena; 4,243	8-3
12	June 22	Minnesota	W 79-62	Whalen, Dydek (16)	Jones (11)	Sales (4)	Mohegan Sun Arena; 6,573	9-3
13	June 23	@ Chicago	W 84-79	Sales (23)	McWilliams-Franklin (14)	Whalen (6)	UIC Pavilion; 2,818	10-3
14	June 25	@ Washington	L 80-87	McWilliams-Franklin, Sales, Jones (15)	McWilliams-Franklin (11)	Whalen (6)	MCI Center; 7,216	10-4
15	June 27	Houston	W 73-57	Sales (19)	Dydek (13)	Whalen (6)	Mohegan Sun Arena; 6,220	11-4
16	June 30	Detroit	L 64-70	Jones (16)	McWilliams-Franklin (10)	Whalen (5)	Mohegan Sun Arena; 7,003	11-5

July

Game	Date	Opponent	Score	High points	High rebounds	High assists	Location/Attendance	Record
17	July 1	@ Indiana	W 76-66	Douglas (22)	Whalen (10)	Whalen, Sales (3)	Conseco Fieldhouse; 7,033	12-5
18	July 6	Charlotte	W 76-71	Whalen (20)	Dydek (9)	Whalen (5)	Mohegan Sun Arena; 6,019	13-5
19	July 8	Phoenix	W 82-77	Douglas (22)	McWilliams-Franklin (12)	McWilliams-Franklin (5)	Mohegan Sun Arena; 9,341	14-5
20	July 15	@ Sacramento	L 63-69	McWilliams-Franklin (13)	McWilliams-Franklin (10)	Phillips (4)	ARCO Arena; 7,997	14-6
21	July 16	@ Seattle	W 92-83	Douglas (26)	Dydek (14)	McWilliams-Franklin (7)	KeyArena; 8,952	15-6
22	July 20	Chicago	W 86-72	Douglas (19)	McWilliams-Franklin (8)	Phillips (6)	Mohegan Sun Arena; 6,740	16-6
23	July 22	@ San Antonio	W 79-61	Dydek (18)	McWilliams-Franklin (10)	McWilliams-Franklin, Whalen (7)	AT&T Center; N/A	17-6
24	July 24	@ New York	W 89-71	McWilliams-Franklin (22)	Dydek (10)	Douglas (6)	Madison Square Garden; 8,419	18-6
25	July 25	Washington	W 73-86	Douglas (28)	McWilliams-Franklin (12)	McWilliams-Franklin (6)	Mohegan Sun Arena; 6,535	19-6
26	July 28	Sacramento	W 75-68	Douglas (19)	McWilliams-Franklin (14)	Douglas (6)	Mohegan Sun Arena; 7,558	20-6
27	July 30	San Antonio	W 72-65	Jones (22)	Jones, Dydek (8)	Carey (4)	Mohegan Sun Arena; 7,454	21-6

August

Game	Date	Opponent	Score	High points	High rebounds	High assists	Location/Attendance	Record
28	August 1	New York	W 66-52	Jones (22)	McWilliams-Franklin, Dydek (10)	Phillips (5)	Mohegan Sun Arena; 7,159	22-6
29	August 3	Los Angeles	W 72-63	McWilliams-Franklin (22)	Jones (10)	Phillips (5)	Mohegan Sun Arena; 8,675	23-6
30	August 6	@ Houston	W 86-67	McWilliams-Franklin (21)	McWilliams-Franklin (13)	Whalen (9)	Toyota Center; 8,726	24-6
31	August 8	@ Chicago	W 85-59	Douglas (19)	McWilliams-Franklin (12)	Whalen, Jones (5)	UIC Pavilion; 3,520	25-6
32	August 9	@ Indiana	W 71-63	Jones (21)	McWilliams-Franklin (14)	Sales (4)	Conseco Fieldhouse; 7,368	26-6
33	August 11	Indiana	L 68-87	Whalen (16)	McWilliams-Franklin (5)	Phillips (4)	Mohegan Sun Arena; 9,341 (sellout)	26-7
34	August 13	@ Detroit	L 65-88	McWilliams-Franklin (13)	McWilliams-Franklin, Sales (5)	Phillips, Dydek (3)	Palace of Auburn Hills; 11,558	26-8

=== Playoffs ===
In the first round of the Eastern Conference Playoffs, the Sun had to face the Washington Mystics. Since the Sun had the better record, the series would be played with game 1 at Washington, game 2 at Connecticut, and game 3 (if needed) at Connecticut. The Sun swept the Mystics and game 3 was not needed. In the second round of the Eastern Conference Playoffs, the Sun had to face rival Detroit Shock. Again, the Sun had the better record and the series would be played with game 1 at Detroit and games 2 and 3 (if needed) at Connecticut. Even though the Sun had a better record in the regular season, Detroit had managed to beat Connecticut in all four of the season meetings. Surprisingly, the Sun won game two of the series but went on to lose game three on their home court. Detroit advanced to the WNBA Finals. Had Connecticut advanced, it would have been the third consecutive season the Sun had made it to the WNBA Finals.

- For the fourth consecutive season, the Sun qualify for the Eastern Conference Playoffs.
- For the fourth consecutive season, the Sun advance to the Eastern Conference Finals.

2006 Game Log: Postseason
Eastern Conference Semifinals

Game	Date	Opponent	Score	High points	High rebounds	High assists	Location/Attendance	Series
1	August 18	@ Washington	W 76-61	Whalen (22)	McWilliams-Franklin (14)	McWilliams-Franklin (6)	Verizon Center; 8,547	1-0
2	August 20	Washington	W 68-65	Douglas (16)	McWilliams-Franklin (14)	Sales (5)	Mohegan Sun Arena; 7,579	2-0

Eastern Conference Finals

Game	Date	Opponent	Score	High points	High rebounds	High assists	Location/Attendance	Series
1	August 24	@ Detroit	L 59-70	Whalen, Phillips (13)	Dydek (8)	McWilliams-Franklin, Whalen, Phillips (3)	Palace of Auburn Hills; 9,476	0-1
2	August 26	Detroit	W 77-73	McWilliams-Franklin (18)	Jones (8)	Sales (4)	Mohegan Sun Arena; 7,377	1-1
3	August 27	Detroit	L 55-79	McWilliams-Franklin (12)	Dydek (9)	Sales (3)	Mohegan Sun Arena; 6,820	1-2

== Depth ==
Pos.	Starter	Bench	Inactive
C	Margo Dydek	Laura Summerton
PF	Taj McWilliams-Franklin	Asjha Jones -- Le'Coe Willingham
SF	Nykesha Sales	Megan Mahoney
SG	Katie Douglas	Erin Phillips
PG	Lindsay Whalen	Jamie Carey

== Player stats ==
- http://www.wnba.com/sun/stats/2006/

== Awards and honors ==
- Katie Douglas, Margo Dydek, Taj McWilliams-Franklin, Nykesha Sales, and Lindsay Whalen were named to the All-Star Team.
- Katie Douglas was named the All-Star Game MVP.
- Head coach Mike Thibault was named Coach of the Year.
- Katie Douglas was named to the All-WNBA First Team.
- Taj McWilliams-Franklin was named to the All-WNBA Second Team.
- Katie Douglas was named to the WNBA All-Defensive First Team for the second consecutive year.
- Margo Dydek was named to the WNBA All-Defensive Second Team.
- Taj McWilliams-Franklin was named WNBA Eastern Conference Player of the Week for the week of July 24, 2006.
- Taj McWilliams-Franklin was named WNBA Eastern Conference Player of the Week for the week of August 7, 2006.
