= Chicago Sky =

Women's National Basketball Association franchise based in Chicago, Illinois

- 2026 Chicago Sky season
- Conference: Eastern
- Leagues: WNBA
- Founded: 2005
- History: Chicago Sky; 2006–present
- Arena: Wintrust Arena
- Location: Chicago, Illinois
- Team colors: Sky blue, radiant yellow, black, white
- Main sponsor: Magellan Corporation
- CEO: Adam Fox
- General manager: Jeff Pagliocca
- Head coach: Tyler Marsh
- Assistants: Latricia Trammell; Tanisha Wright; Rena Wakama
- Ownership: Michael J. Alter; Nadia Rawlinson; Harvey Alter; John Rogers
- Championships: 1 (2021)
- Conference titles: 1 (2014) (Note: In the 2016 season, the WNBA changed its playoff format such that teams were seeded for the playoffs regardless of conference.)
- Retired numbers: 2 (3, 14)
- Website: sky.wnba.com
Heroine	Explorer	Rebel

The Chicago Sky are an American professional basketball team based in Chicago. The Sky compete in the Women's National Basketball Association (WNBA) as a member of the Eastern Conference. The franchise was founded prior to the 2006 season. The Sky experienced a period of success from 2013 to 2016, making four playoff appearances and playing in the 2014 WNBA Finals. They experienced a second period of success from 2019 to 2022 and won their first championship in the 2021 WNBA Finals.

The team is owned by Michael J. Alter (principal owner) and Nadia Rawlinson (co-owner & chairman). Unlike many other WNBA teams, it is not affiliated with a National Basketball Association (NBA) counterpart, although the Chicago Bulls play in the same market.

== History ==
=== Franchise origin ===
In February 2005, NBA commissioner David Stern announced that Chicago had been awarded a new WNBA franchise, temporarily named WNBA Chicago. On May 27, 2005, former NBA player and coach Dave Cowens was announced as the team's first head coach and general manager. The team home would be the UIC Pavilion. On September 20, 2005, the team name and logo formally debuted at an introduction event held at the Adler Planetarium. Team President and CEO Margaret Stender explained the team colors of yellow and blue represent "[a] beautiful day in Chicago between the blue sky and bright sunlight to highlight the spectacular skyline." The event was highlighted by the appearance of several star players, including Diana Taurasi, Temeka Johnson, Sue Bird, and Ruth Riley.

In November 2005, the team held an expansion draft to help build its inaugural roster of players. Among the notable selections were Brooke Wyckoff from the Connecticut Sun, Bernadette Ngoyisa from the San Antonio Silver Stars, Elaine Powell from the Detroit Shock, and Stacey Dales (who had retired prior to the 2005 season) from the Washington Mystics.

On February 28, 2006, the team announced that two of the minority shareholders of the team are Michelle Williams, from the vocal group Destiny's Child, and Mathew Knowles, father of Destiny's Child lead singer Beyoncé Knowles.

=== Early years and limited success (2006–2012) ===
With their first ever college draft pick, the Sky selected Candice Dupree sixth overall in the 2006 WNBA draft. In their first season, the Sky achieved a 5–29 record and finished last in the Eastern Conference. After the season, head coach Dave Cowens resigned to join the coaching staff of the Detroit Pistons. University of Missouri-Kansas City women's basketball head coach Bo Overton was named the Sky's new head coach and general manager on December 12, 2006.

Despite having the highest odds of drawing the first pick in the 2007 WNBA draft lottery, the Sky ended up with the third overall pick, which they used to select Armintie Price. The team was vastly improved in the 2007 season, but still finished with a 14–20 record and were two games behind the final playoff spot in the Eastern Conference. Price was named the 2007 WNBA Rookie of the Year. On March 12, 2008, the Sky announced that Overton had resigned his position of coach/general manager amid harassment allegations. Assistant coach Steven Key was named head coach/general manager.

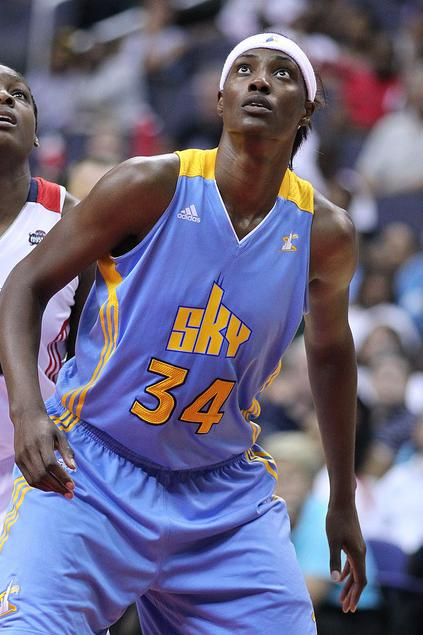
Sylvia Fowles

With the second overall pick in the 2008 WNBA draft, the Sky selected Sylvia Fowles. In the 2008 season, the Sky once again failed to make the playoffs, posting a 12–22 record and finishing 5th in the East, as Fowles missed 17 games due to a knee injury.

In the 2009 WNBA draft, the Sky selected point guard Kristi Toliver with the third overall pick. In the 2009 season, the Sky contended for a playoff position, but finished with a record of 16-18 and lost a three-team tiebreaker to the Washington Mystics for the final playoff position.

2011 home uniform, manufactured by Adidas

Entering the 2010 season, the Sky moved to Allstate Arena in the suburb of Rosemont, Illinois. In the 2010 WNBA draft, the Sky selected Epiphanny Prince fourth overall. The team's roster underwent several changes, highlighted by the trades of Toliver and Dupree, and the acquisition of Shameka Christon and Cathrine Kraayeveld. At one point during the season, they were at .500, just a few games back for the final playoff spot. However, they lost eight of their final ten games and were eliminated from playoff contention, finishing with a 14–20 record. Key resigned as GM and coach, and was replaced on October 28, 2010, by former LSU head coach Pokey Chatman.

In the 2011 WNBA draft, the Sky selected Courtney Vandersloot as the third overall pick. During the 2011 season, the team was once again led by Fowles, who averaged a double-double with 20 points and 10.2 rebounds per game, and was named Defensive Player of the Year. The Sky finished the season with a 14–20 record for the second year in a row but were encouraged by going 10–7 at home.

Before the 2012 season, the Sky focused on adding more experience, signing former champions Ticha Penicheiro and Ruth Riley, and trading the second pick in the 2012 WNBA draft in exchange for Swin Cash and Le'Coe Willingham. The Sky began the season 7–1, but an injury to Prince derailed the team, which ultimately finished 14–20 for the third consecutive year.

=== Playoff runs (2013–2016) ===
The 2013 season was a turning point for the Sky. In the draft, they selected Elena Delle Donne with the second overall pick. Delle Donne became the first rookie to lead All-Star voting, averaging 18.1 points per game (fourth in the league) and leading the Sky to a 24–10 record and first place in the Eastern Conference. Delle Donne was named Rookie of the Year, Fowles was named Defensive Player of the Year for the second time and led the league in rebounds, and Cash received the Kim Perrot Sportsmanship Award. Chatman finished a close second for Coach of the Year, Delle Donne narrowly missed the Most Valuable Player award, and Fowles and Delle Donne were named to the All-WNBA first and second teams. Reaching the playoffs for the first time, the Sky lost in the conference semifinals to the Indiana Fever.

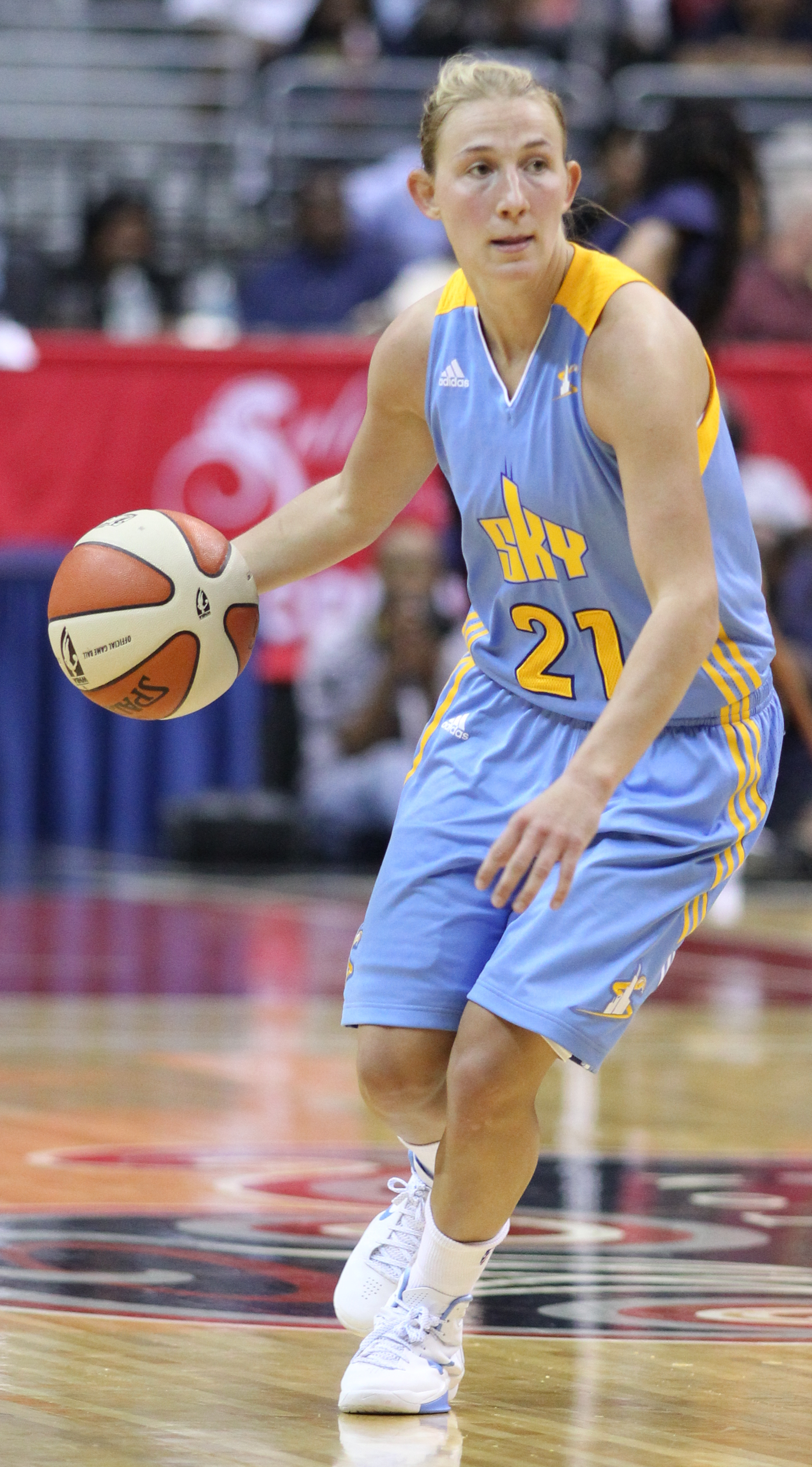
Courtney Vandersloot

In the 2014 season, the Sky posted an unimpressive 15–19 regular season record, but qualified for the playoffs as the 4th seed in the Eastern Conference. Guard Allie Quigley, who had grown up in nearby Joliet, Illinois, was named Sixth Woman of the Year. In the playoffs, they won two best-of-three series in the conference semifinals and finals to reach the WNBA Finals for the first time. In the best-of-five series, they were swept by the Phoenix Mercury in three games.

In February 2015, the Sky acquired Chicago native Cappie Pondexter from the New York Liberty in a straight-up trade for Prince. Fowles, who had refused to sign a contract extension, sat out the first half of the 2015 season until she was traded in a three-team deal that sent Érika de Souza to the Sky. The team posted a 21–13 record and earned second place in the Eastern Conference. Delle Donne was named the league's MVP, Vandersloot led the league in assists, and Quigley was once again named Sixth Woman of the Year. Despite their improved regular season performance, the Sky fell to the Indiana Fever in the conference semifinals.

In the 2016 season, under the WNBA's new playoff format where teams were seeded regardless of conference, the Sky finished 4th in the league and returned to the playoffs. Missing the injured Delle Donne in the postseason, they lost 3–1 in the semifinals to the Los Angeles Sparks.

=== Rebuilding (2017–2018) ===
The Sky hired Amber Stocks as head coach and general manager, replacing Chatman, on December 6, 2016. During the 2016–17 offseason, in what was called one of the biggest trades in league history, the Sky traded Delle Donne to the Washington Mystics, receiving Kahleah Copper, Stefanie Dolson, and the Mystics' second overall pick (turned into Alaina Coates) in the 2017 WNBA draft. In the 2017 season, the Sky posted a 12–22 record and missed the playoffs for the first time in five seasons.

Before the 2018 season, the Sky moved their home games to Wintrust Arena. In the 2018 WNBA draft, the Sky selected Diamond DeShields and Gabby Williams in the first round. The team posted a 13–21 record and missed the playoffs for a second consecutive season. On August 31, 2018, the Sky relieved Stocks as head coach and general manager. During these seasons, Vandersloot led the league in assists (setting a new assists-per-game record in 2017) and Quigley won back-to-back Three-Point Contests at the All-Star Game.

=== Return to the playoffs and first championship (2019–22) ===
In November 2018, the Sky hired James Wade as the team's new head coach and general manager. The Sky selected Katie Lou Samuelson in the first round of the 2019 WNBA draft and traded away Coates. The 2019 season would be a turnaround for the Sky, as they finished with a 20–14 record and entered the playoffs as a fifth seed. Wade received the Coach of the Year Award, and Vandersloot exceeded her own assists-per-game record for the second straight season. Vandersloot, Quigley, and DeShields were all named All-Stars, and DeShields won the All-Star Game Skills Challenge. In the playoffs, they defeated the Phoenix Mercury in the first round, but then lost to the Las Vegas Aces on the road on a buzzer-beater in the final seconds.

In the 2020 season, which was shortened and held in a bubble in Bradenton, Florida due to the COVID-19 pandemic, the Sky showed promise early in the season but battled injuries and ended the season with a sixth-seeded 12–10 record. They lost a first round single-elimination game to the Phoenix Mercury.

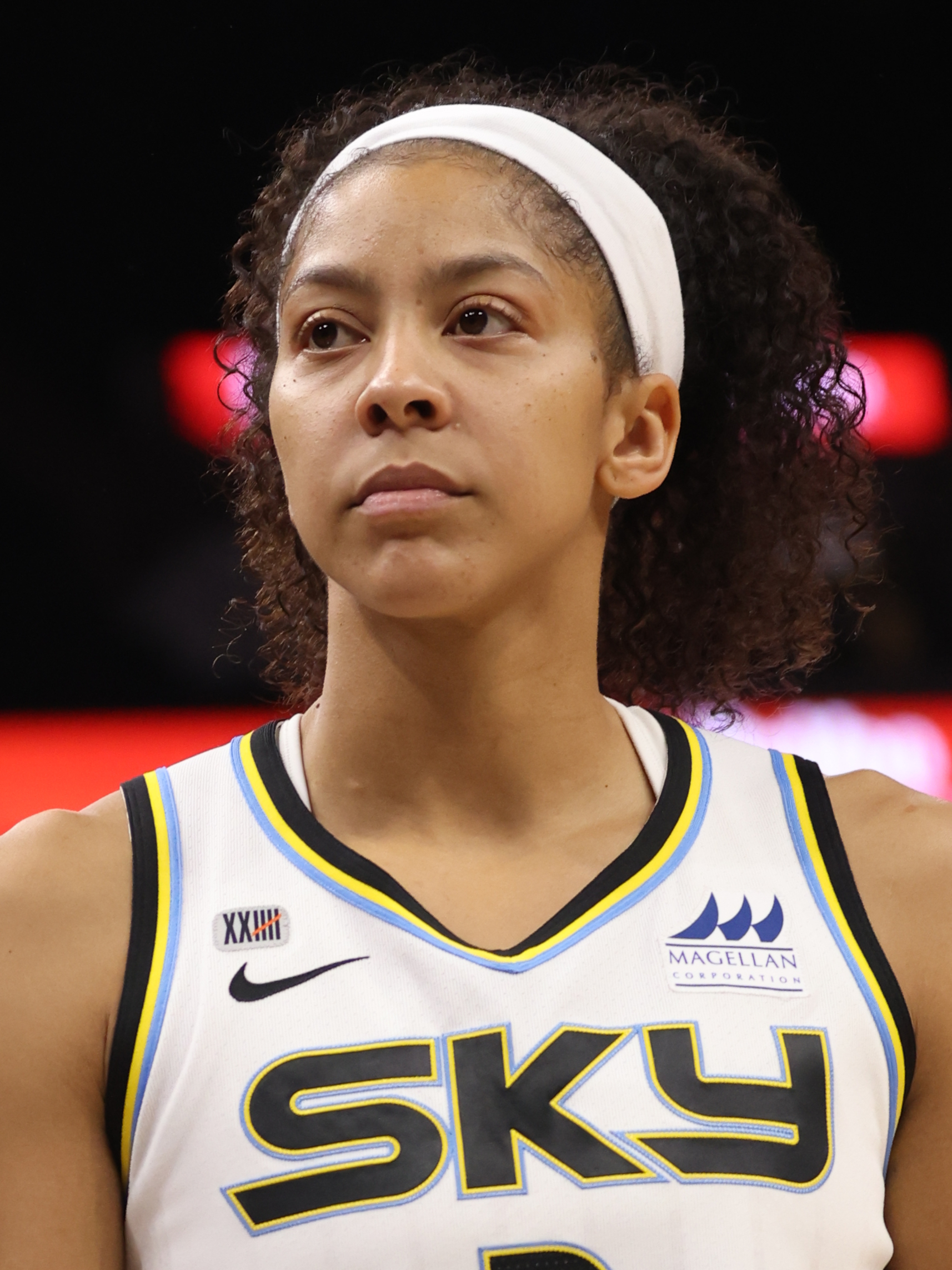
Candace Parker

On February 1, 2021, the Sky announced the signing of free agent Candace Parker, a two-time MVP and Finals MVP. Parker, who had grown up in Naperville, Illinois and played her first 12 seasons in the league with the Los Angeles Sparks, stated that she wanted to return to her hometown team. The Sky had a volatile 2021 season, including a seven-game losing streak and a seven-game winning streak, which they ended with a 16–16 record. They entered the playoffs as the 6th seed, winning two single-elimination games and a semifinals series against the Connecticut Sun on their way to the Finals. On October 17, 2021, the Sky won their first WNBA Championship after defeating the Phoenix Mercury 3–1 in the 2021 WNBA Finals. Kahleah Copper was named the Finals MVP. A parade and rally to celebrate the team were held on October 19, 2021. Since the new playoff format was adopted, the Sky became the lowest-seeded team and first team without a winning record to win the championship.

In the offseason, longtime center Dolson left the team in free agency and the Sky added former Finals MVP Emma Meesseman. The team's success continued in the 2022 season, posting a 26–10 record and earning the second seed. The Sky also appeared in the WNBA Commissioner's Cup, hosting the game but losing to the Las Vegas Aces. In the playoffs, the Sky defeated the New York Liberty in the first round, but lost in the semifinals to the Connecticut Sun.

=== Rebuilding and roster and coaching changes (2023–present) ===
The 2023 season marked a period of significant change for the Sky, with many longtime players departing in free agency, including Vandersloot, Quigley, Azurá Stevens, and Parker. Centered on Copper and new roster additions including Marina Mabrey, Courtney Williams, Elizabeth Williams, and Alanna Smith, the team's record hovered around .500 for much of the season. In July, head coach James Wade announced his resignation to take an assistant coaching position with the NBA's Toronto Raptors. Assistant coach Emre Vatansever served as interim head coach for the remainder of the season. The team finished as the eighth-seed with a 18–22 record and lost in the first round of the playoffs to the eventual champion Las Vegas Aces.

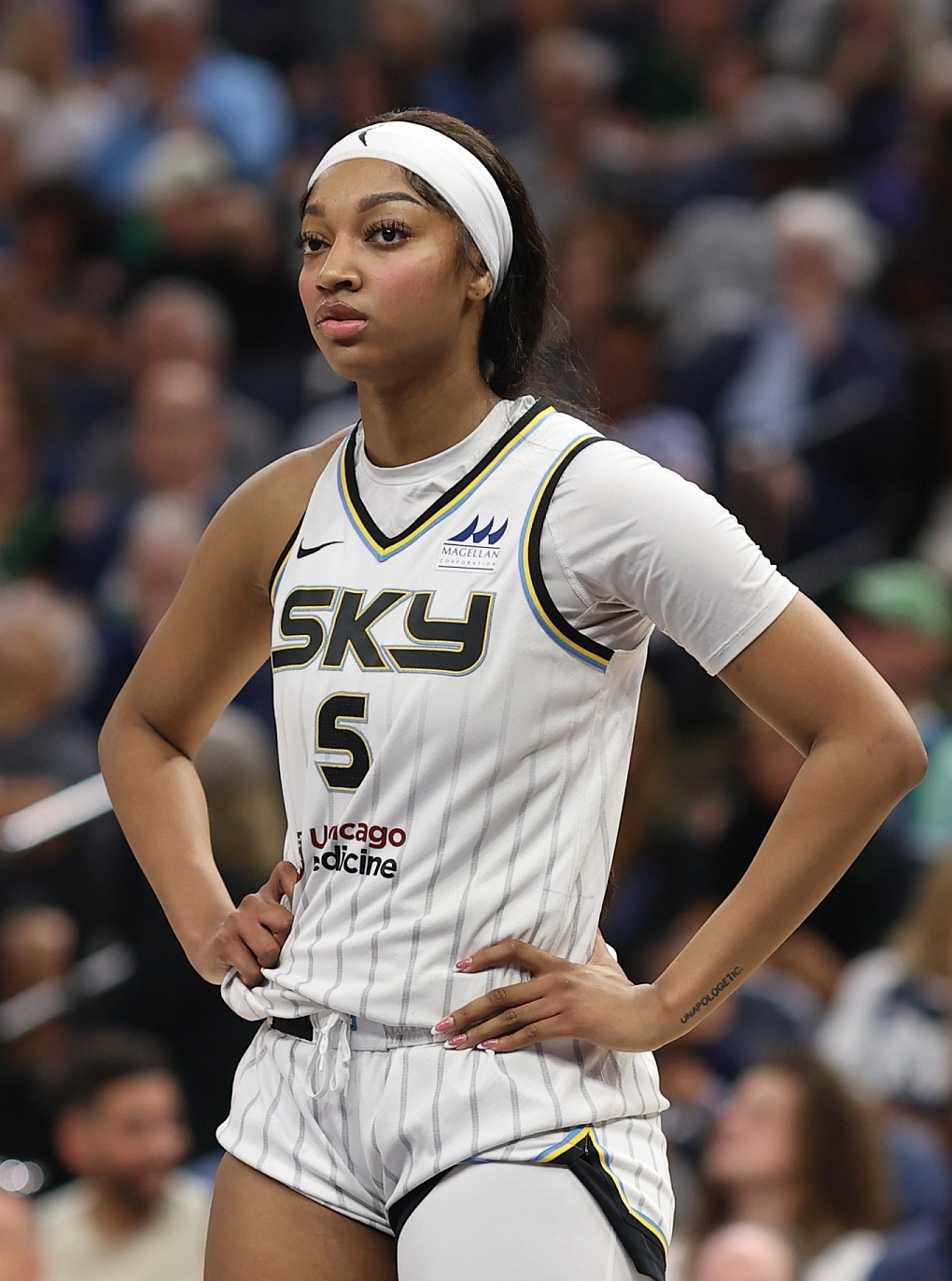
Angel Reese, 2024

In October 2023, the Sky named Teresa Weatherspoon as the new head coach and Jeff Pagliocca as the new general manager. In another turbulent offseason, starters Courtney Williams and Smith left the team in free agency, and Copper was traded to the Mercury. Through various trades, the Sky eventually acquired the third and seventh pick in the 2024 WNBA draft, selecting Kamilla Cardoso and Angel Reese. The Sky had a solid start to the 2024 season and went into the Olympic break in eighth place with a 10–14 record. During the break, Mabrey was traded to the Sun. The Sky ultimately finished 10th with a 13–27 record and failed to make the playoffs. After the season, Weatherspoon was fired.

In November 2024, Tyler Marsh was named the new head coach. In the offseason, Vandersloot returned to the team as a free agent, and the Sky traded their third overall pick in the 2025 WNBA draft to the Mystics in exchange for Ariel Atkins. The 2025 season was a difficult one for the Sky, who finished with a league-worst 10–34 record—their worst result since the franchise's inaugural season. They started the year 3–10 and struggled to find consistency due to injuries and player absences, including extended stretches without their top three players: Vandersloot, who played only seven games; Atkins, who missed seven games; and Reese, who sat out more than 10 games. At the All-Star break, the Sky stood at 7–16, with frequent lineup changes and an unsettled rotation contributing to their lack of momentum. The season was also marked by controversy when, in early September, Reese voiced her frustration in an interview with the Chicago Tribune, calling for major roster upgrades and hinting she may leave if the team's outlook doesn’t improve. The organization responded by suspending her for half a game due to "statements detrimental to the team," a move widely criticized by fans and seen as disproportionate. Reese, who averaged 14.7 points, 12.6 rebounds, 3.7 assists, and 1.5 steals, led the WNBA in rebounding for the second year straight and made her second All-Star appearance. Despite the team’s struggles, both Reese and Cardoso (13.4 points, 8.6 rebounds, 2.5 assists) showed promising individual growth, but the relationship between the front office and its players remains uncertain heading into next season. Reese wound up traded to the Atlanta Dream for draft picks in 2026, and the Sky followed her departure signing Skylar Diggins, Rickea Jackson, Jacy Sheldon, and DiJonai Carrington, as well as bringing back 2021 champion Azurá Stevens.

== Name, logo, and uniforms ==
=== Uniforms ===
- 2006–2010: At home, white with light blue on the sides. Collar is light blue. On the road, light blue with gold on the sides. Collar is gold.
- 2011–2012: At home, white with light blue stripes on the sides. Collar is light blue. On the road, light blue with gold stripes on the sides. Collar is gold. In addition, both the home and away uniforms feature the team nickname and numbers in gold.
- 2013–2014: A new number and name font was introduced, while the basic uniform design was retained.
- 2015: Magellan Corporation introduced as new Jersey sponsor. Unlike most teams with jersey sponsors, the Sky opted to emblazon the Magellan logo on the left shoulder in place of the team's alternate logo.
- 2016: As part of a league-wide initiative, all games featured all-color uniform matchups. Therefore, the Sky unveiled a gold uniform in addition to their regular light blue road uniform. Magellan was retained as the uniform sponsor.
- 2018: Magellan was joined by University of Chicago Medicine as jersey sponsors.

=== Mascot ===
Skye the Lioness is the mascot of the Sky. The team introduced Skye the Lioness on August 26, 2024. This replaced the team’s previous mascot, “Sky Guy”. The choice of a lioness was inspired by the famed lion sculptures adorning the main entrance of building of the Art Institute of Chicago.

The mascot character was designed under the direction of Chicago Sky CMO Tania Haladner and designed by the mascot designer Tom Sapp and the team at Real Characters Inc, who have created other mascots for teams including the Portland Trail Blazers, the University of Florida, and the Denver Nuggets. Its debut game was August 28, 2024, at the Wintrust arena. The team's legacy mascot, Sky Guy, remained through the 2024 season to support Skye the Lioness' debut.

== Season-by-season records ==
Table key
AMVP	All-Star Game Most Valuable Player
APP	Assists Peak Performer
COY	Coach of the Year
DPOY	Defensive Player of the Year
FMVP	Finals Most Valuable Player
MIP	Most Improved Player
MVP	Most Valuable Player
ROY	Rookie of the Year
RPP	Rebounding Peak Performer
SIX	Sixth Woman of the Year
SPOR	Sportsmanship Award
SPP	Scoring Peak Performer

WNBA champions	Conference champions	Playoff berth

Season	Team	Conference standing (2006–16) League standing (2016–present)		Regular season			Playoff Results	Awards	Head coach
Season	Team	Conference standing (2006–16) League standing (2016–present)		W	L	PCT	Playoff Results	Awards	Head coach
Chicago Sky
2006	2006	East	7th	5	29	.147			Dave Cowens
2007	2007	East	6th	14	20	.412			Bo Overton
2008	2008	East	5th	12	22	.353			Steven Key
2009	2009	East	5th	16	18	.471			Steven Key
2010	2010	East	6th	14	20	.412			Steven Key
2011	2011	East	5th	14	20	.412		Sylvia Fowles (DPOY)	Pokey Chatman
2012	2012	East	5th	14	20	.412			Pokey Chatman
2013	2013	East	1st	24	10	.706	Lost Conference Semifinals (Indiana, 0–2)	Elena Delle Donne (ROY); Sylvia Fowles (DPOY, RPP); Swin Cash (SPOR)	Pokey Chatman
2014	2014	East	4th	15	19	.441	Won Conference Semifinals (Atlanta, 2–1); Won Conference Finals (Indiana, 2–1); Lost WNBA Finals (Phoenix, 0–3)	Allie Quigley (SIX)	Pokey Chatman
2015	2015	East	2nd	21	13	.618	Lost Conference Semifinals (Indiana, 1–2)	Elena Delle Donne (MVP, SPP); Allie Quigley (SIX); Courtney Vandersloot (APP)	Pokey Chatman
2016	2016	WNBA (Note: In the 2016 season, the WNBA changed its playoff format such that teams were seeded for the playoffs regardless of conference.)	4th	18	16	.529	Won Second Round (Atlanta, 1–0); Lost WNBA Semifinals (Los Angeles, 1–3)		Pokey Chatman
2017	2017	WNBA	9th	12	22	.353		Courtney Vandersloot (APP)	Amber Stocks
2018	2018	WNBA	10th	13	21	.382		Courtney Vandersloot (APP)	Amber Stocks
2019	2019	WNBA	5th	20	14	.588	Won First Round (Phoenix, 1–0); Lost Second Round (Las Vegas, 0–1)	James Wade (COY); Courtney Vandersloot (APP)	James Wade
2020	2020	WNBA	6th	12	10	.545	Lost First Round (Connecticut, 0–1)	Courtney Vandersloot (APP)	James Wade
2021	2021	WNBA	6th	16	16	.500	Won First Round (Dallas, 1–0); Won Second Round (Minnesota, 1–0); Won Semifinals (Connecticut, 3–1); Won WNBA Finals (Phoenix, 3–1)	Courtney Vandersloot (APP); Kahleah Copper (Finals MVP)	James Wade
2022	2022	WNBA	2nd	26	10	.722	Won First Round (New York, 2–1); Lost Semifinals (Connecticut, 2–3)	James Wade (EOY)	James Wade
2023	2023	WNBA	8th	18	22	.450	Lost First Round (Las Vegas, 0–2)		James Wade(7–9); Emre Vatansever(11–13)
2024	2024	WNBA	9th	13	27	.325			Teresa Weatherspoon
2025	2025	WNBA	T-12th	10	34	.185			Tyler Marsh
2026	2026	WNBA	10th	16	28	.267			Tyler Marsh
Regular season				323	411	.445	1 Conference Championships		
Playoffs				20	22	.476	1 WNBA Championships		

== Players ==
=== Current roster ===
Chicago Sky roster
Players
Coaches

Pos.	No.	Nat.	Name	Height	Weight	DOB	From	Yrs
G	24	(United States)	Banham, Rachel	5' 9" (1.75m)	175 lb (79kg)	1993-07-15	Minnesota	9
C	10	(Brazil)	Cardoso, Kamilla	6' 7" (2.01m)	215 lb (98kg)	2001-04-30	South Carolina	2
G/F	7	(United States)	Carrington, DiJonai	5' 11" (1.8m)	175 lb (79kg)	1998-01-08	Baylor	5
G	9	(United States)	Cloud, Natasha	5' 10" (1.78m)	160 lb (73kg)	1992-02-22	Saint Joseph's	10
G	35	(Mali)	Coulibaly, Aicha	6' 0" (1.83m)		2001-10-18	Texas A&M	R
G	4	(United States)	Diggins, Skylar (injured)	5' 9" (1.75m)	140 lb (64kg)	1990-08-02	Notre Dame	10
F	5	(United States)	Jackson, Rickea (injured)	6' 2" (1.88m)	175 lb (79kg)	2001-03-16	Tennessee	2
G	11	(Mexico)	Jaquez, Gabriela	6' 0" (1.83m)		2003-11-19	UCLA	R
G	15	(United States)	Maly, Morgan	6' 1" (1.85m)		2002-01-25	Creighton	R
G	20	(United States)	Martin, Kate	6' 0" (1.83m)	172 lb (78kg)	2000-06-05	Iowa	2
G	0	(United States)	Sheldon, Jacy	5' 10" (1.78m)	140 lb (64kg)	2000-08-23	Ohio State	2
F/C	30	(United States)	Stevens, Azurá	6' 6" (1.98m)	180 lb (82kg)	1996-02-01	Connecticut	7
G	12	(United States)	Taylor, Sydney	5' 9" (1.75m)		2001-06-21	Louisville	R
G	22	(Hungary)	Vandersloot, Courtney	5' 8" (1.73m)	137 lb (62kg)	1989-02-08	Gonzaga	14
C	1	(United States)	Williams, Elizabeth	6' 3" (1.91m)	200 lb (91kg)	1993-06-23	Duke	10
F	–	(Slovenia)	Sivka, Ajša (DP)	6' 4" (1.93m)		2005-11-23	Slovenia	–

Head coach
(United States) Tyler Marsh (Birmingham–Southern)
Assistant coaches
(United States) Kelly Faris (Connecticut)
(United States) Jhared Simpson (Wheeling)
(United States) Latricia Trammell (East Central)
(United States) Rena Wakama (Western Carolina)

Legend

- (C) Team captain
- (DP) Unsigned draft pick
- (FA) Free agent
- (S) Suspended
- Injured

WNBA roster page

East
ATL
CHI
CON
IND
NY
TOR
WAS
West
DAL
GS
LV
LA
MIN
PHO
POR
SEA

=== Retired numbers ===
Chicago Sky retired numbers
No.	Player	Position	Tenure	Ref.
14	Allie Quigley	G	2013–2022	
3	Candace Parker	F	2021–2022	

=== Former players ===
- Imani Boyette (2016–2017)
- Tamera Young (2009–2017)
- Swin Cash (2012–2013)
- Kahleah Copper (2017–2023), now a member of the Phoenix Mercury
- Monique Currie (2007)
- Stacey Dales (2006–2007)
- Elena Delle Donne (2013–2016)
- Érika de Souza (2015–2016)
- Stefanie Dolson (2017–2021), now a member of the Seattle Storm
- Clarissa dos Santos (2015–2016)
- Candice Dupree (2006–2009), currently the head coach at Tennessee State
- Sylvia Fowles (2008–2014)
- Cathrine Kraayeveld (2010–2011)
- Stacey Lovelace-Tolbert (2006)
- Nikki McCray (2006)
- Chasity Melvin (2006–2008)
- Bernadette Ngoyisa (2006–2007)
- Chelsea Newton (2006)
- Candace Parker (2021–2022)
- Jia Perkins (2006–2010)
- Cappie Pondexter (2015–2017)
- Elaine Powell (2006), currently an assistant coach for the Minnesota Lynx
- Allie Quigley (2013–2022)
- Angel Reese (2024–2025), now a member of the Atlanta Dream
- Ashley Robinson (2006)
- Gabby Williams (2018–2021), now a member of the Golden State Valkyries
- Brooke Wyckoff (2006–2009), currently the head coach at Florida State
- Tamera Young (2009–2017)

== Coaches and staff ==
=== Owners ===
- Michael J. Alter and Nadia Rawlinson (2023–present)

=== Head coaches ===
Chicago Sky head coaches
Name	Start	End	Seasons	Regular season				Playoffs			
Name	Start	End	Seasons	W	L	PCT	G	W	L	PCT	G
Dave Cowens	May 25, 2005	September 12, 2006	1	5	29	.147	34	0	0	.000	0
Bo Overton	December 12, 2006	March 12, 2008	1	14	20	.412	34	0	0	.000	0
Steven Key	March 12, 2008	September 10, 2010	3	42	60	.412	102	0	0	.000	0
Pokey Chatman	October 29, 2010	October 28, 2016	6	106	98	.520	204	7	12	.368	19
Amber Stocks	December 8, 2016	August 31, 2018	2	25	43	.368	68	0	0	.000	0
James Wade	November 8, 2018	July 1, 2023	5	81	59	.579	139	13	8	.619	21
Emre Vatansever	July 1, 2023	September 21, 2023	1	11	13	.458	24	0	2	.000	2
Teresa Weatherspoon	October 12, 2023	September 26, 2024	1	13	27	.325	40	0	0	.000	0
Tyler Marsh	November 3, 2024	Present	1	10	34	.227	44	0	0	.000	0

=== General managers ===
- Dave Cowens (2006)
- Bo Overton (2007)
- Steven Key (2008–2010)
- Pokey Chatman (2011–2016)
- Amber Stocks (2017–2018)
- James Wade (2019–2023)
- Emre Vatansever (2023)
- Jeff Pagliocca (2024–present)

=== Assistant coaches ===
- Steven Key (2006–2007)
- Roger Reding (2007)
- Stephanie White (2007–2010)
- Michael Mitchell (2008–2010)
- Jeff House (2011–2012)
- Christie Sides (2011–2016)
- Tree Rollins (2013–2015)
- Jonah Herscu (2016)
- Carlene Mitchell (2017)
- Awvee Storey (2017)
- Carla Morrow (2018–2019)
- Bridget Pettis (2019)
- Olaf Lange (2020–2021)
- Emre Vatansever (2020–2023)
- Tonya Edwards (2021–2023)
- Ann Wauters (2022–2023)
- Yoann Cabioc'h (2023)
- Crystal Robinson (2024)
- Sydney Johnson (2024)
- Tamera Young (2024)
- Courtney Paris (2025)
- Tanisha Wright (2025–present)
- Rena Wakama (2025–present)
- Latricia Trammell (2026–present)

== Statistics ==
Chicago Sky statistics
2000s

Season	Individual			Team vs Opponents		
Season	PPG	RPG	APG	PPG	RPG	FG%
2006	C. Dupree (13.7)	B. Ngoyisa (5.7)	J. Perkins (3.2)	68.3 vs 79.0	30.5 vs 36.4	.394 vs .452
2007	C. Dupree (16.7)	C. Dupree (7.7)	D. Canty (4.1)	74.3 vs 76.8	34.3 vs 36.0	.406 vs .429
2008	J. Perkins (17.0)	C. Dupree (7.9)	D. Canty (4.1)	72.7 vs 73.8	33.1 vs 34.1	.428 vs .416
2009	C. Dupree (16.7)	C. Dupree (7.9)	D. Canty (3.2)	75.7 vs 79.2	31.9 vs 34.0	.435 vs .442

2010s

Season	Individual			Team vs Opponents		
Season	PPG	RPG	APG	PPG	RPG	FG%
2010	S. Fowles (17.8)	S. Fowles (9.9)	D. Canty (3.4)	76.1 vs 76.8	31.7 vs 33.4	.437 vs .444
2011	S. Fowles (20.0)	S. Fowles (10.2)	C. Vandersloot (3.7)	74.2 vs 75.2	33.8 vs 32.6	.438 vs .418
2012	E. Prince (18.1)	S. Fowles (10.4)	C. Vandersloot (4.6)	75.2 vs 75.5	34.9 vs 30.1	.431 vs .429
2013	E. Delle Donne (18.1)	S. Fowles (11.5)	C. Vandersloot (5.6)	79.4 vs 73.6	37.1 vs 33.2	.420 vs .404
2014	E. Delle Donne (17.9)	S. Fowles (10.2)	C. Vandersloot (5.6)	76.2 vs 78.2	34.1 vs 35.6	.434 vs .420
2015	E. Delle Donne (23.4)	E. Delle Donne (8.4)	C. Vandersloot (5.8)	82.9 vs 78.8	36.6 vs 33.6	.446 vs .425
2016	E. Delle Donne (21.5)	E. Delle Donne (7.0)	C. Vandersloot (4.7)	86.2 vs 85.6	35.6 vs 32.9	.462 vs .436
2017	A. Quigley (16.4)	J. Breland (6.3)	C. Vandersloot (8.1)	82.1 vs 87.2	33.8 vs 36.5	.461 vs .435
2018	A. Quigley (15.4)	Ch. Parker (5.8)	C. Vandersloot (8.6)	83.8 vs 90.1	33.1 vs 36.5	.453 vs .462
2019	D. DeShields (16.2)	J. Lavender (6.9)	C. Vandersloot (9.1)	84.6 vs 83.3	36.4 vs 35.4	.448 vs .418

2020s

Season	Individual			Team vs Opponents		
Season	PPG	RPG	APG	PPG	RPG	FG%
2020	A. Quigley (15.4)	Ch. Parker (6.4)	C. Vandersloot (10.0)	86.7 vs 84.1	33.6 vs 32.2	.491 vs .453
2021	K. Copper (14.4)	Ca. Parker (8.4)	C. Vandersloot (8.6)	83.3 vs 81.9	35.0 vs 35.9	.441 vs .433
2022	K. Copper (15.7)	Ca. Parker (8.6)	C. Vandersloot (6.5)	86.3 vs 81.3	34.8 vs 33.2	.481 vs .438
2023	K. Copper (18.7)	A. Smith (6.6)	C. Williams (6.3)	81.7 vs 83.4	33.6 vs 34.9	.442 vs .451
2024	C. Carter (17.5)	A. Reese (13.1)	M. Mabrey (4.5)	77.4 vs 82.5	36.6 vs 33.8	.422 vs .446
2025	A. Reese (14.7)	A. Reese (12.6)	C. Vandersloot (5.3)	75.8 vs 85.8	35.5 vs 32.6	.425 vs .452

== Media coverage ==
Chicago Sky games are broadcast locally in an exclusive agreement with Independent Station WCIU-TV. Local broadcasters for the Sky games are Lisa Byington and Stephen Bardo. Select games are broadcast nationally on ABC(WLS-TV), ESPN, CBS(WBBM-TV), Ion(WCPX-TV), NBA TV, Amazon Prime Video, NBC (WMAQ-TV), USA, and NBCSN.

The Sky was on radio for two seasons on WVON-AM 1690 with Les Grobstein on play-by-play and Tajua Catchings (whose sister Tamika Catchings is a star with the Indiana Fever) handling color. After 2008, WVON did not carry games any longer over a financial disagreement, and the Sky has not been on radio since. The radio broadcast of their home games were online during the 2008 season, but never since.

== All-time notes ==
=== Regular season attendance ===
- A sellout for a basketball game at UIC Pavilion (2006–2009) is 6,972.
- A sellout for a basketball game at Allstate Arena (2010–2017) is 17,500.
- A sellout for a basketball game at Wintrust Arena (2018–present) is 10,387.

Regular season all-time attendance
Year	Average	High	Low	Sellouts	Total for year	WNBA game average
2006	3,390 (14th)	5,219	2,570	0	57,635	7,476
2007	3,915 (14th)	6,972	2,505	1	66,557	7,742
2008	3,656 (13th)	6,304	2,276	0	62,146	7,948
2009	3,933 (13th)	5,881	2,396	0	66,855	8,039
2010	4,293 (12th)	6,950	2,408	0	72,986	7,834
2011	5,536 (11th)	13,838	2,876	0	94,116	7,954
2012	5,573 (10th)	13,161	2,884	0	94,746	7,452
2013	6,601 (9th)	14,201	4,135	0	112,212	7,531
2014	6,685 (9th)	16,402	3,958	0	113,640	7,578
2015	6,960 (7th)	16,304	4,141	0	118,322	7,184
2016	7,009 (7th)	16,444	5,034	0	119,147	7,665
2017	6,853 (9th)	14,102	4,498	0	116,501	7,716
2018	6,358 (6th)	10,024	4,131	0	108,091	6,721
2019	6,749 (6th)	10,143	4,212	0	114,727	6,535
2020	Due to the COVID-19 pandemic, the season was played in Bradenton, Florida without fans.					
2021	3,187 (2nd)	8,331	1,004	0	47,805	2,636
2022	7,180 (4th)	9,314	4,935	0	129,241	5,679
2023	7,242 (6th)	9,025	4,316	0	144,834	6,615
2024	8,757 (8th)	9,872	7,807	11	175,148	9,807
2025	9,073 (9th)	19,601	6,572	0	199,601	10,986

=== Draft picks ===
- 2006 Expansion Draft: Jia Perkins, Brooke Wyckoff, Elaine Powell, Kiesha Brown, Deanna Jackson, Laura Macchi, Stacey Lovelace, DeTrina White, Ashley Robinson, Chelsea Newton, Bernadette Ngoyisa, Francesca Zara, Stacey Dales
- 2006: Candice Dupree (6), Jennifer Harris (20), Kerri Gardin (34)
- 2007 Charlotte Dispersal Draft: Monique Currie (1)
- 2007: Armintie Price (3), Carla Thomas (10), Stephanie Raymond (20), Jessica Dickson (21), Jenna Rubino (27)
- 2008: Sylvia Fowles (2), Quianna Chaney (19), Angela Tisdale (33)
- 2009 Houston Dispersal Draft: Mistie Williams Bass (3)
- 2009: Kristi Toliver (3), Danielle Gant (16), Jennifer Risper (29)
- 2010 Sacramento Dispersal Draft: Courtney Paris (4)
- 2010: Epiphanny Prince (4), Abi Olajuwon (28)
- 2011: Courtney Vandersloot (3), Carolyn Swords (15), Angie Bjorklund (17), Amy Jaeschke (27)
- 2012: Shey Peddy (23), Sydney Carter (27)
- 2013: Elena Delle Donne (2), Brooklyn Pope (28)
- 2014: Markeisha Gatling (10), Gennifer Brandon (22), Jamierra Faulkner (34)
- 2015: Cheyenne Parker (5), Betnijah Laney (17), Aleighsa Welch (22)
- 2016: Imani Boyette (10), Jordan Jones (34)
- 2017: Alaina Coates (2), Tori Jankoska (9), Chantel Osahor (21), Makayla Epps (33)
- 2018: Diamond DeShields (3), Gabby Williams (4), Amarah Coleman (28)
- 2019: Katie Lou Samuelson (4), Chloe Jackson (15), María Conde (27)
- 2020: Ruthy Hebard (8), Japreece Dean (30), Kiah Gillespie (32)
- 2021: Shyla Heal (8), Natasha Mack (16)
- 2022: No Draft Picks
- 2023: Kayana Traylor (23), Kseniya Malashka (35)
- 2024: Kamilla Cardoso (3), Angel Reese (7), Brynna Maxwell (13)
- 2025: Ajša Sivka (10), Hailey Van Lith (11), Maddy Westbeld (16), Aicha Coulibaly (22)
- 2026: Gabriela Jaquez (5), Latasha Lattimore (21), Tonie Morgan (32)

=== Trades ===
- June 29, 2006: The Sky traded Ashley Robinson to the Seattle Storm in exchange for Cisti Greenwalt and a second-round pick in the 2007 Draft.
- March 23, 2007: The Sky traded Chelsea Newton and the 21st pick in the 2007 Draft to the Sacramento Monarchs for the 10th pick in the 2007 Draft.
- May 24, 2007: The Sky traded Monique Currie to the Washington Mystics in exchange for Chasity Melvin.
- August 12, 2009: The Sky traded Armintie Price to the Atlanta Dream in exchange for Tamera Young.
- March 30, 2010: The Sky traded Candice Dupree to the Phoenix Mercury and a second-round pick in the 2010 Draft to the New York Liberty in exchange for Shameka Christon and Cathrine Kraayeveld from New York. New York also received Cappie Pondexter and Kelly Mazzante from Phoenix.
- May 13, 2010: The Sky traded Kristi Toliver to the Los Angeles Sparks in exchange for a second-round pick in the 2011 Draft.
- April 20, 2011: The Sky traded Jia Perkins to the San Antonio Silver Stars in exchange for Michelle Snow.
- June 1, 2011: The Sky traded a second-round pick in the 2012 Draft to the Los Angeles Sparks in exchange for Lindsay Wisdom-Hylton.
- January 2, 2012: The Sky traded the second pick in the 2012 Draft to the Seattle Storm in exchange for Swin Cash, Le'coe Willingham, and the 23rd pick in the 2012 Draft.
- March 14, 2012: The Sky traded a third-round pick in the 2013 Draft to the San Antonio Silver Stars in exchange for Sonja Petrovic.
- May 7, 2014: The Sky traded Swin Cash to the Atlanta Dream in exchange for Courtney Clements.
- February 16, 2015: The Sky traded Epiphanny Prince to the New York Liberty in exchange for Cappie Pondexter.
- July 27, 2015: The Sky traded Sylvia Fowles and a second-round pick in the 2016 Draft to the Minnesota Lynx in exchange for Erika de Souza from Atlanta. Atlanta also received Damaris Dantas, Reshanda Gray, and a first-round pick in the 2016 Draft from Minnesota.
- February 2, 2017: The Sky traded Elena Delle Donne to the Washington Mystics in exchange for Kahleah Copper, Stefanie Dolson, and the #2 overall pick in the 2017 Draft.
- February 27, 2017: The Sky traded Clarissa Dos Santos to the San Antonio Stars in exchange for Astou Ndour.
- May 20, 2019: The Sky traded their second round pick in the 2020 Draft to the Los Angeles Sparks in exchange for Jantel Lavender.
- May 21, 2019: The Sky traded Alaina Coates to Minnesota in exchange for Minnesota's third round pick in the 2020 Draft.
- February 12, 2020: The Sky traded Astou Ndour to Dallas in exchange for Dallas' first round pick in the 2021 Draft.
- February 12, 2020: The Sky traded Kaite Lou Samuelson and a first round pick in the 2021 Draft in exchange for Azurá Stevens.
- February 9, 2021: The Sky traded their second round pick in the 2022 Draft for the 16th pick in the 2021 Draft (from Dallas).
- May 9, 2021: The Sky traded Gabby Williams to the Los Angeles Sparks in exchange for Stephanie Watts and the rights to Leonie Fiebich.
- June 2, 2021: The Sky traded, Shyla Heal, their third round pick in the 2022 Draft, and the option to swap pick positions in the first round of the 2022 Draft to the Dallas Wings in exchange for Dana Evans.
- February 3, 2022: The Sky traded Diamond DeShields to Phoenix in exchange for Julie Allemand and the Phoenix Mercury's 2023 first round pick.
- March 20, 2022: The Sky traded Lexie Brown to Los Angeles in exchange for Li Yueru.
- February 11, 2023: The Sky traded the rights to Leonie Fiebich, their 1st round pick in the 2023 Draft, 1st, 2nd, and 3rd round picks in the 2024 Draft, and 2nd round pick in the 2025 Draft to acquire Marina Mabrey in a four team trade.
- February 6, 2024: The Sky traded Kahleah Copper, the rights to Morgan Bertsch, to acquire Brianna Turner, Michaela Onyenwere, the third pick in the 2024 Draft, their own 2025 second round draft pick, Phoenix's 2026 first round draft pick, and the right to swap 2026 second round picks with Phoenix.
- February 19, 2024: The Sky traded Julie Allemand and the rights to Li Yueru in exchange for the 8th pick in the 2024 Draft.
- March 14, 2024: The Sky traded Rebekah Gardner in exchange for New York's 2025 and 2026 second round draft picks.
- April 14, 2024: The Sky traded Skia Koné, the 8th pick in the 2024 Draft, their 2025 second round draft pick, and the right to swap first round picks in the 2026 Draft to the Minnesota Lynx in exchange for the 7th pick in the 2024 Draft and the rights to Nikolina Milić.
- July 17, 2024: The Sky traded Marina Mabrey and their second round pick in the 2025 Draft in exchange for Rachel Banham, Moriah Jefferson, Connecticut's 2025 first round draft pick, and the right to swap 2026 first round draft picks with the Sun.
- February 4, 2025: The Sky traded Lindsay Allen and the rights to Nikolina Milić in exchange for Rebecca Allen.
- February 7, 2025: The Sky traded Dana Evans in exchange for the 16th and 22nd picks in the 2025 Draft.
- February 23, 2025: The Sky traded the third pick in the 2025 Draft, their 2027 second round draft pick and the right to swap 2027 first round picks with the Washington Mystics in exchange for Ariel Atkins.
- April 13, 2025: The Sky traded their first round pick in the 2026 draft and extinguished the rights to swap first round picks with Minnesota in exchange for the eleventh pick of the 2025 Draft.
- April 1, 2026: The Sky traded two second-round picks in the 2026 draft to the Toronto Tempo and Portland Fire in exchange for protection from having unprotected players selected in the 2026 expansion draft.
- April 6, 2026: The Sky traded Angel Reese and their second-round pick swap in the 2028 draft to the Atlanta Dream in exchange for a first-round pick in the 2027 draft and a first-round pick in the 2028 draft.
- April 11, 2026: The Sky traded their first-round pick in the 2028 draft to the Washington Mystics in exchange for Jacy Sheldon.
- April 12, 2026: The Sky traded Ariel Atkins to the Los Angeles Sparks in exchange for Rickea Jackson.

=== All-Stars ===
- 2006: Candice Dupree
- 2007: Candice Dupree
- 2008: No All-Star Game
- 2009: Candice Dupree, Sylvia Fowles, Jia Perkins
- 2010: Sylvia Fowles
- 2011: Sylvia Fowles, Epiphanny Prince, Courtney Vandersloot
- 2012: No All-Star Game
- 2013: Elena Delle Donne, Sylvia Fowles, Epiphany Prince
- 2014: Jessica Breland, Elena Delle Donne
- 2015: Elena Delle Donne, Cappie Pondexter ·
- 2016: No All-Star Game
- 2017: Stefanie Dolson, Allie Quigley
- 2018: Allie Quigley
- 2019: Diamond DeShields, Allie Quigley, Courtney Vandersloot
- 2020: No All-Star Game
- 2021: Kahleah Copper, Candace Parker, Courtney Vandersloot
- 2022: Kahleah Copper, Emma Meesseman, Candace Parker, Courtney Vandersloot
- 2023: Kahleah Copper
- 2024: Angel Reese
- 2025: Angel Reese

=== Olympians ===
- 2008: Sylvia Fowles
- 2012: Swin Cash, Sylvia Fowles
- 2016: Elena Delle Donne, Erika de Souza (BRA), Clarissa Dos Santos (BRA)
- 2020: Astou Ndour (ESP), Stefanie Dolson

=== Honors and awards ===
- 2006 All-Rookie Team: Candice Dupree
- 2007 All-Rookie Team: Armintie Price
- 2008 All-Defensive Second Team: Sylvia Fowles
- 2008 All-Rookie Team: Sylvia Fowles
- 2010 All-WNBA First Team: Sylvia Fowles
- 2010 All-Defensive First Team: Sylvia Fowles
- 2010 All-Rookie Team: Epiphanny Prince
- 2010 Stars at the Sun Game MVP: Sylvia Fowles
- 2011 All-WNBA Second Team: Sylvia Fowles
- 2011 Defensive Player of the Year: Sylvia Fowles
- 2011 All-Defensive First Team: Sylvia Fowles
- 2011 All-Rookie Team: Courtney Vandersloot
- 2012 All-WNBA Second Team: Sylvia Fowles
- 2012 All-Defensive First Team: Sylvia Fowles
- 2013 Rookie of the Year: Elena Delle Donne
- 2013 Defensive Player of the Year: Sylvia Fowles
- 2013 All-Rookie Team: Elena Delle Donne
- 2013 All-Defensive First Team: Sylvia Fowles
- 2013 Peak Performer (Rebounding): Sylvia Fowles
- 2014 WNBA Sixth Woman of the Year: Allie Quigley
- 2014 All-Defensive Second Team: Sylvia Fowles
- 2015 WNBA MVP: Elena Delle Donne
- 2015 WNBA Sixth Woman of the Year: Allie Quigley
- 2015 Peak Performer (Scoring): Elena Delle Donne
- 2015 Peak Performer (Assists): Courtney Vandersloot
- 2015 All-WNBA First Team: Elena Delle Donne
- 2015 All-WNBA Second Team: Courtney Vandersloot
- 2016 All-Rookie Team: Imani Boyette
- 2017 Peak Performer (Assists): Courtney Vandersloot
- 2018 All-WNBA Second Team: Courtney Vandersloot
- 2018 All-Rookie Team: Diamond DeShields
- 2018 Peak Performer (Assists): Courtney Vandersloot
- 2019 Peak Performer (Assists): Courtney Vandersloot
- 2019 Coach of the Year: James Wade
- 2019 All-WNBA First Team: Courtney Vandersloot
- 2019 All-WNBA Second Team: Diamond DeShields
- 2020 Peak Performer (Assists): Courtney Vandersloot
- 2020 All-WNBA First Team: Courtney Vandersloot
- 2021 All-WNBA Second Team: Courtney Vandersloot
- 2021 Finals MVP: Kahleah Copper
- 2022 Basketball Executive of the Year: James Wade
- 2022 All-WNBA First Team: Candace Parker
- 2022 All-Rookie Team: Rebekah Gardner
- 2023 All-Defensive Second Team: Elizabeth Williams
- 2024 Peak Performer (Rebounds): Angel Reese
- 2024 All-Rookie Team: Kamilla Cardoso, Angel Reese
- 2025 Peak Performer (Rebounds): Angel Reese

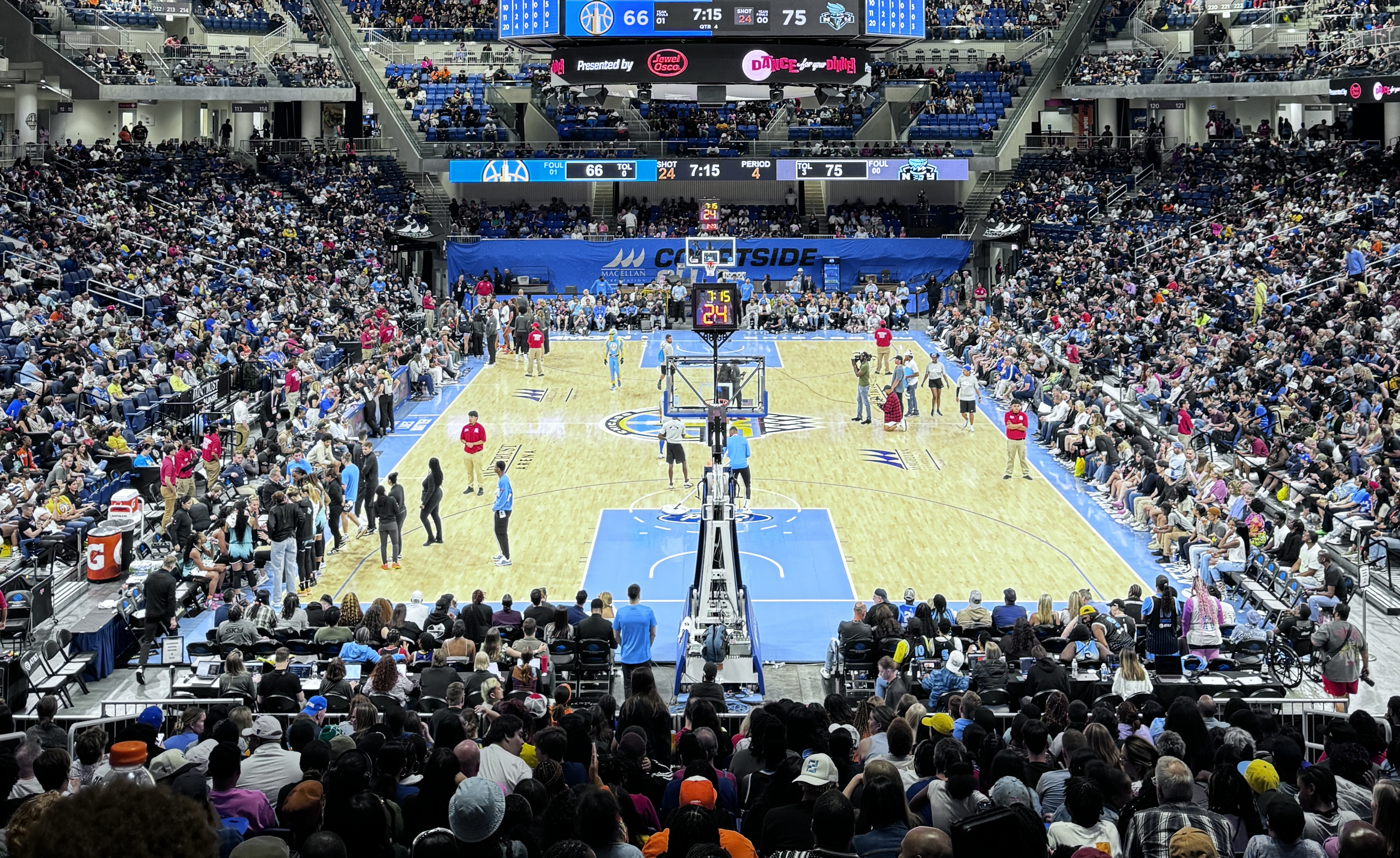
Chicago Sky Game at Wintrust Arena

== Arenas ==
- UIC Pavilion (2006–2009)
- Allstate Arena (2010–2017)
- Wintrust Arena (2018–present)

== Notes ==
Sporting positions
Preceded by Seattle Storm	WNBA Champions; 2021 (first title)	Succeeded by Las Vegas Aces
Preceded by Atlanta Dream	WNBA Eastern Conference Champions; 2014 (First title)	Succeeded by Indiana Fever
