= 2006 WNBA season =

- League: Women's National Basketball Association
- Sport: Basketball
- Duration: May 20 – September 9, 2006
- Games: 34
- Teams: 14
- Total attendance: 1,779,366
- Average attendance: 7,476
- TV partner(s): ABC, ESPN, NBA TV

Draft
- Top draft pick: (United States) Seimone Augustus
- Picked by: Minnesota Lynx

Regular season
- Top seed: Connecticut Sun
- Season MVP: (United States) Lisa Leslie (Los Angeles)
- Top scorer: (Argentina) / (United States) Diana Taurasi (Phoenix)

Playoffs
- Finals champions: Detroit Shock
- Runners-up: Sacramento Monarchs
- Finals MVP: (Russia) / (United States) Deanna Nolan (Detroit)

WNBA seasons
- ← 2005 2007 →

The 2006 WNBA season was the Women's National Basketball Association's tenth season.

The league added one team: the Chicago Sky. The Sky were the first expansion team since 2000 when the Indiana Fever, Miami Sol, Portland Fire, and the Seattle Storm came to the WNBA. A separate expansion draft for the took place on November 16, 2005.

On April 5, the WNBA held their draft. Seimone Augustus of Louisiana State University was the number one overall pick. She was selected by the Minnesota Lynx. Cappie Pondexter of Rutgers University went number two. She was selected by the Phoenix Mercury.

The season started on May 20 with a game between the Sacramento Monarchs and the Phoenix Mercury. The game was televised by ABC. The Monarchs won the game 105–78. On July 12, The All Star Game was held at Madison Square Garden in New York City, New York. The East All Stars defeated the West All Stars 98–82. Katie Douglas of the Connecticut Sun was named MVP in the game with 16 points, 5 rebounds, 4 assists. The 2006 WNBA season concluded on August 13. Lisa Leslie of the Los Angeles Sparks won the league MVP. Mike Thibault of the Connecticut Sun was named Coach of The Year. Seimone Augustus of the Minnesota Lynx was named Rookie of the Year. The season ended with the Detroit Shock winning their second WNBA Championship.

== Regular season ==
=== Standings ===
Eastern Conference

Eastern Conference	W	L	PCT	GB	Home	Road	Conf.
z - Connecticut Sun	26	8	.765	–	14–3	12–5	15–5
x - Detroit Shock	23	11	.676	3.0	14–3	9–8	14–6
x - Indiana Fever	21	13	.618	5.0	12–5	9–8	12–8
x - Washington Mystics	18	16	.529	8.0	13–4	5–12	12–8
e - New York Liberty	11	23	.324	15.0	7–10	4–13	7–13
e - Charlotte Sting	11	23	.324	15.0	7–10	4–3	6–14
e - Chicago Sky	5	29	.147	21.0	3–14	2–15	4–16

Western Conference

Western Conference	W	L	PCT	GB	Home	Road	Conf.
Los Angeles Sparks ^{x}	25	9	.735	–	15–2	10–7	15–5
Sacramento Monarchs ^{x}	21	13	.618	4.0	14–3	7–10	10–10
Houston Comets ^{x}	18	16	.529	7.0	12–5	6–11	11–9
Seattle Storm ^{x}	18	16	.529	7.0	9–8	9–8	10–10
Phoenix Mercury ^{o}	18	16	.529	7.0	10–7	8–9	8–12
San Antonio Silver Stars ^{o}	13	21	.382	12.0	6–11	7–10	10–10
Minnesota Lynx ^{o}	10	24	.294	15.0	8–9	2–15	6–14

== Playoffs ==
This was the outlook for the 2006 WNBA Playoffs. Teams in italics had home court advantage. Teams in bold advanced to the next round. Numbers to the left of each team indicate the team's original playoffs seeding in their respective conferences. Numbers to the right of each team indicate the number of games the team won in that round.

**Conference semifinals** Best-of-3
E1	**Connecticut**	2
E4	Washington	0
E2	**Detroit**	2
E3	Indiana	0
W1	**Los Angeles**	2
W4	Seattle	1
W2	**Sacramento**	2
W3	Houston	0

**Conference finals** Best-of-3
E1	Connecticut	1
E2	**Detroit**	2
W1	Los Angeles	0
W2	**Sacramento**	2

**WNBA Finals**; Best-of-5
E2	**Detroit**	3
W2	Sacramento	2

- **Bold** – series winner
- Italic – team with home court advantage

== Awards ==
=== Individual ===
Award		Winner	Team
Most Valuable Player (MVP)		Lisa Leslie	Los Angeles Sparks
Finals MVP		Deanna Nolan	Detroit Shock
Defensive Player of the Year		Tamika Catchings	Indiana Fever
Most Improved Player		Erin Buescher	Sacramento Monarchs
Peak Performers	**Scoring**	Diana Taurasi	Phoenix Mercury
Peak Performers	**Rebounding**	Cheryl Ford	Detroit Shock
Peak Performers	**Assists**	Nikki Teasley	Washington Mystics
Rookie of the Year		Seimone Augustus	Minnesota Lynx
Kim Perrot Sportsmanship Award		Dawn Staley	Houston Comets
Coach of the Year		Mike Thibault	Connecticut Sun

=== Team ===
Award		Player	Team
All-WNBA	First Team	Lisa Leslie	Los Angeles Sparks
All-WNBA	First Team	Diana Taurasi	Phoenix Mercury
All-WNBA	First Team	Tamika Catchings	Indiana Fever
All-WNBA	First Team	Lauren Jackson	Seattle Storm
All-WNBA	First Team	Katie Douglas	Connecticut Sun
All-WNBA	Second Team	Cheryl Ford	Detroit Shock
All-WNBA	Second Team	Alana Beard	Washington Mystics
All-WNBA	Second Team	Taj McWilliams-Franklin	Connecticut Sun
All-WNBA	Second Team	Seimone Augustus	Minnesota Lynx
All-WNBA	Second Team	Sheryl Swoopes	Houston Comets
All-Defensive	First Team	Tamika Catchings	Indiana Fever
All-Defensive	First Team	Lisa Leslie	Los Angeles Sparks
All-Defensive	First Team	Sheryl Swoopes	Houston Comets
All-Defensive	First Team	Tully Bevilaqua	Indiana Fever
All-Defensive	First Team	Katie Douglas	Connecticut Sun
All-Defensive	Second Team	Alana Beard	Washington Mystics
All-Defensive	Second Team	Margo Dydek	Connecticut Sun
All-Defensive	Second Team	Deanna Nolan	Detroit Shock
All-Defensive	Second Team	Cheryl Ford	Detroit Shock
All-Defensive	Second Team	Yolanda Griffith	Sacramento Monarchs
All-Rookie Team		Seimone Augustus	Minnesota Lynx
All-Rookie Team		Cappie Pondexter	Phoenix Mercury
All-Rookie Team		Candice Dupree	Chicago Sky
All-Rookie Team		Sophia Young	San Antonio Silver Stars
All-Rookie Team		Monique Currie	Charlotte Sting

=== Players of the Week ===
Week ending	Player	Team
May 30	Lisa Leslie	Los Angeles Sparks
June 5	Seimone Augustus	Minnesota Lynx
June 12	Cappie Pondexter	Phoenix Mercury
June 19	Lisa Leslie (2)	Los Angeles Sparks
June 26	Lisa Leslie (3)	Los Angeles Sparks
July 3	Lauren Jackson	Seattle Storm
July 10	Diana Taurasi	Phoenix Mercury
July 17	Lisa Leslie (4)	Los Angeles Sparks
July 24	Taj McWilliams-Franklin	Connecticut Sun
July 31	Tamika Catchings	Indiana Fever
August 7	Taj McWilliams-Franklin (2)	Connecticut Sun
August 14	Diana Taurasi (2)	Phoenix Mercury

== Coaches ==
=== Eastern Conference ===
- Charlotte Sting: Muggsy Bogues
- Chicago Sky: Dave Cowens
- Connecticut Sun: Mike Thibault
- Detroit Shock: Bill Laimbeer
- Indiana Fever: Brian Winters
- New York Liberty: Pat Coyle
- Washington Mystics: Richie Adubato

=== Western Conference ===
- Houston Comets: Van Chancellor
- Los Angeles Sparks: Joe Bryant
- Minnesota Lynx: Suzie McConnell-Serio and Carolyn Jenkins
- Phoenix Mercury: Paul Westhead
- Sacramento Monarchs: John Whisenant
- San Antonio Silver Stars: Dan Hughes
- Seattle Storm: Anne Donovan
