= List of 2009 WNBA season transactions =

This is a list of all personnel changes for the 2009 Women's National Basketball Association off-season and 2009 WNBA season.

== Retirement ==
The following players played their final season in 2008.

Date	Team	Name	Position	Years pro	Notes
April 13, 2009	Connecticut Sun	Jamie Carey	Guard	4	

== Front office movement ==
=== Head coach changes ===
Coaches signed in off-season
Date	Team	Outgoing coach	New head coach	Previous position
November 6, 2008	Washington Mystics	Jessie Kenlaw	Julie Plank	Assistant Coach of the Lynx
June 3, 2009	Minnesota Lynx	Don Zierden	Jennifer Gillom	Assistant Coach of the Lynx
In-season coaching change
Date	Team	Outgoing coach	Interim coach	Reason
June 15, 2009	Detroit Shock	Bill Laimbeer	Rick Mahorn	Resigned
July 12, 2009	Sacramento Monarchs	Jenny Boucek	John Whisenant	Started the season 3-10
July 31, 2009	New York Liberty	Pat Coyle	Anne Donovan	Started the season 6-11

=== General manager changes ===
GM hired in off-season
Date	Team	Outgoing GM	New head GM	Previous position
October 23, 2008	Washington Mystics	Linda Hargrove	Angela Taylor	VP of Business Operations for the Lynx
In-season GM change
Date	Team	Outgoing GM	Interim GM	Reason
June 15, 2009	Detroit Shock	Bill Laimbeer	Cheryl Reeve	Resigned

== Player movement ==
The following is a list of player movement via free agency and trades.

=== Trades ===
December 17, 2008
To Los Angeles Sparks

- 13th pick in 2009 draft
To Atlanta Dream

- negotiating rights to Chamique Holdsclaw
January 21, 2009
To Phoenix Mercury

- Alison Bales
To Atlanta Dream

- second-round pick in 2009 draft
January 30, 2009
To Phoenix Mercury

- Nicole Ohlde
To Minnesota Lynx

- Kelly Miller
- LaToya Pringle
January 30, 2009
To Minnesota Lynx

- first- and second-round picks in 2009 draft
To Washington Mystics

- Lindsey Harding
- second-round pick in 2009 and 2010 drafts
January 30, 2009
To Minnesota Lynx

- Christi Thomas
To Los Angeles Sparks

- Vanessa Hayden
March 20, 2009
To Sacramento Monarchs

- Barbara Farris
To Phoenix Mercury

- Kim Smith
- A'Quonesia Franklin
March 26, 2009
To Phoenix Mercury

- Temeka Johnson
To Los Angeles Sparks

- first-round pick in 2010 draft
April 9, 2009
To Atlanta Dream

- Ashley Shields
To Detroit Shock

- 18th pick in 2009 draft
May 5, 2009
To Minnesota Lynx

- Liberty's first-round pick in 2010 draft
- Rafaella Masciadri
To Los Angeles Sparks

- Noelle Quinn
To New York Liberty

- Sidney Spencer
August 12, 2009
To Atlanta Dream

- Armintie Price
To Chicago Sky

- Tamera Young
August 17, 2009
To Sacramento Monarchs

- Kristin Haynie
To Detroit Shock

- Crystal Kelly

=== Signed from free agency ===
Signed in the off-season
Player	Signed	New team	Former team
January
Kerri Gardin	January 7	Connecticut Sun	
Brooke Smith	January 7	Phoenix Mercury	
Sophia Young	January 7	San Antonio Silver Stars	
Tanisha Wright	January 7	Seattle Storm	
Erin Thorn	January 7	Chicago Sky	New York Liberty
Vickie Johnson	January 8	San Antonio Silver Stars	
Tully Bevilaqua	January 8	Indiana Fever	
K.B. Sharp	January 9	Chicago Sky	
Kara Braxton	January 9	Detroit Shock	
Shyra Ely	January 12	Chicago Sky	Seattle Storm
Nikki Teasley	January 12	Atlanta Dream	
Catherine Kraayeveld	January 12	New York Liberty	
DeMya Walker	January 14	Sacramento Monarchs	
Chelsea Newton	January 14	Sacramento Monarchs	
Kristen Mann	January 20	Washington Mystics	Indiana Fever
Ticha Penicheiro	January 20	Sacramento Monarchs	
Barbara Turner	January 20	Connecticut Sun	
Lauren Ervin	January 23	Connecticut Sun	
Vanessa Hayden	January 30	Minnesota Lynx	
February
Janell Burse	February 9	Seattle Storm	
Chasity Melvin	February 9	Washington Mystics	Chicago Sky
Hamchetou Maiga-Ba	February 10	Sacramento Monarchs	Houston Comets
Ashley Robinson	February 10	Seattle Storm	
Anete Jekabsone-Zogota	February 13	Connecticut Sun	Dynamo Moscow (Russia)
Jennifer Lacy	February 17	Atlanta Dream	
Michelle Snow	February 18	Atlanta Dream	Houston Comets
Delisha Milton-Jones	February 20	Los Angeles Sparks	
Suzy Batkovic	February 20	Seattle Storm	
Yolanda Griffith	February 20	Indiana Fever	Seattle Storm
Shannon Johnson	February 23	Seattle Storm	Houston Comets
Tina Thompson	March 12	Los Angeles Sparks	Houston Comets
Belinda Snell	March 30	San Antonio Silver Stars	Phoenix Mercury
April
Betty Lennox	April 14	Los Angeles Sparks	Atlanta Dream
Chamique Holdsclaw	April 20	Atlanta Dream	Los Angeles Sparks
Kristin Haynie	April 22	Detroit Shock	Atlanta Dream
Chen Nan	April 28	Chicago Sky	BaYi Stationery (China)
Edwige Lawson-Wade	April 30	San Antonio Silver Stars	
May
Tamecka Dixon	May 4	Indiana Fever	Houston Comets
Lauren Jackson	May 4	Seattle Storm	
Kristi Harrower	May 7	Los Angeles Sparks	Minnesota Lynx
Roneeka Hodges	May 7	Minnesota Lynx	Houston Comets
Coco Miller	May 15	Atlanta Dream	Washington Mystics
June
Kiesha Brown	June 3	Connecticut Sun	Washington Mystics
Ketia Swanier	June 3	Phoenix Mercury	Connecticut Sun
Signed in the regular season
Player	Date	New team	Former team
Jessica Moore	June 11	Indiana Fever	Los Angeles Sparks
Eshaya Murphy	June 11	Indiana Fever	Washington Mystics
Kristen Mann	June 16	Washington Mystics	
Jessica Davenport	June 17	Indiana Fever	New York Liberty
Tan White	June 19	Connecticut Sun	Indiana Fever
July
Ivory Latta	July 3	Atlanta Dream	
Bernice Mosby	July 6	Washington Mystics	
Anna DeForge	July 10	Detroit Shock	Minnesota Lynx
Tasha Humphrey	July 17	Minnesota Lynx	Washington Mystics
Penny Taylor	July 17	Phoenix Mercury	
Anna Montanana	July 26	Minnesota Lynx	Ros Casares (Spain)
Ann Wauters	July 31	San Antonio Silver Stars	
August
Nikki Teasley	August 18	Detroit Shock	Atlanta Dream
Mistie Bass	August 21	Chicago Sky	
September
Katie Mattera	September 1	Chicago Sky	San Antonio Silver Stars
La'Tangela Atkinson	September 9	Seattle Storm	
Chelsea Newton	September 9	Sacramento Monarchs	
A'Quonesia Franklin	September 10	Seattle Storm	Phoenix Mercury
Tanae Davis-Cain	September 11	Detroit Shock	

==== 7-day contracts ====
Player	Signed	New team	Former team
June
Britany Miller	June 8	Detroit Shock	
Kelly Schumacher	June 10	Detroit Shock	Washington Mystics
Sherill Baker	June 26	Detroit Shock	Indiana Fever
July
Anna DeForge	July 27	Detroit Shock	
August
Barbara Farris	August 4	Detroit Shock	Sacramento Monarchs
Whitney Boddie	August 7, 14, 21	Sacramento Monarchs	
Lisa Willis	August 28	Sacramento Monarchs	New York Liberty
September
Lisa Willis	September 4	Sacramento Monarchs	

=== Released ===
==== Waived ====
Player	Waived	Team
June
Erica White	June 11	Indiana Fever
Khadijah Whittington	June 11	Indiana Fever
Yolanda Griffith	June 17	Indiana Fever
Kristi Cirone	June 19	Connecticut Sun
Barbara Turner	June 28	Connecticut Sun
July
Nikki Teasley	July 3	Atlanta Dream
Lauren Ervin	July 3	Connecticut Sun
Tasha Humphrey	July 6	Washington Mystics
Barbara Farris	July 6	Detroit Shock
Allie Quigley	July 14	Phoenix Mercury
Christi Thomas	July 17	Minnesota Lynx
LaToya Pringle	July 26	Minnesota Lynx
Katie Mattera	July 31	San Antonio Silver Stars
August
Chelsea Newton	August 7	Sacramento Monarchs
Chen Nan	August 21	Chicago Sky
September
Brooke Wyckoff	September 1	Chicago Sky

==== Renounced ====
Minnesota Lynx

- Kristi Harrower (to Sparks)

==== Training camp cuts ====
All players here did not make the final roster

Atlanta Dream	Chicago Sky	Connecticut Sun	Detroit Shock	Indiana Fever	Los Angeles Sparks	Minnesota Lynx
Marlies Gipson; Chantelle Anderson; Ivory Latta	Quianna Chaney; Danielle Gant; Liz Moggenberg; Jennifer Risper; Mistie Bass	Ketia Swanier; Ashley Hayes; Lyndra Littles; Danielle Page; Carrem Gay	Tanae Davis-Cain; Kristen Rasmussen; Tiera DeLaHoussaye; Britany Miller; Sequoia Holmes	Doneeka Lewis; Sherill Baker; Tan White; Danielle Campbell	Britney Jordan; Ashley Paris; Marta Fernandez; Jessica Moore	Kamesha Hairston; Aisha Mohammed; Tye'sha Fluker; Emily Fox; Anna DeForge
New York Liberty	Phoenix Mercury	Sacramento Monarchs	San Antonio Silver Stars	Seattle Storm	Washington Mystics	
Jessica Davenport; Lisa Willis	Murriel Page; Alison Bales; Yuko Oga; Sha Brooks; Laurie Koehn	Barbara Farris; Charel Allen; Whitney Boddie; Morgan Warburton; Miao Li Jie	Morenike Atunrase; Amber Petillion; Valeriya Berezhynska; Candyce Bingham; Joyce Ekworomadu; Bernadette Ngoyisa	Kimberly Beck; Mara Freshour; La'Tangela Atkinson; Kasha Terry; A'Quonesia Franklin; Aja Parham	Kiesha Brown; Eshaya Murphy; Kristen Mann; Kelly Schumacher; Bernice Mosby	

== WNBA draft ==
The 2009 WNBA Draft was held on April 9, 2009 in Secaucus, New Jersey.

=== First round selections ===
Pick	Player	Nationality	WNBA Team	School/Club Team
1	Angel McCoughtry	United States	Atlanta Dream	Louisville
2	Marissa Coleman	United States	Washington Mystics	Maryland
3	Kristi Toliver	United States	Chicago Sky	Maryland
4	Renee Montgomery	United States	Minnesota Lynx	Connecticut
5	DeWanna Bonner	United States	Phoenix Mercury	Auburn
6	Briann January	United States	Indiana Fever	Arizona State
7	Courtney Paris	United States	Sacramento Monarchs	Oklahoma
8	Kia Vaughn	United States	New York Liberty	Rutgers
9	Quanitra Hollingsworth	United States	Minnesota Lynx (from L.A., via Wash.)	Virginia Commonwealth
10	Chante Black	United States	Connecticut Sun	Duke
11	Shavonte Zellous	United States	Detroit Shock	Pittsburgh
12	Ashley Walker	United States	Seattle Storm	California
13	Lindsay Wisdom-Hylton	United States	Los Angeles Sparks (from S.A., via Atl.)	Purdue
