= 2009 Chicago Sky season =

- Head coach: Steven Key
- Arena: UIC Pavilion

Results
- Record: 16–18 (.471)
- Place: 4th (Eastern)
- Playoff finish: Did not qualify

Media
- Television: CN100

The 2009 WNBA season was the 4th for the Chicago Sky of the Women's National Basketball Association. Steven Key returned as coach - marking the first time in franchise history that the Sky did not have to hire a new coach after 1 year. The Sky received the 3rd Overall pick in the 2009 WNBA draft and used it on Maryland guard Kristi Toliver.

== Transactions ==
=== Houston Comets Dispersal Draft ===
With the Houston Comets ceasing operation and based on the 2008 records of teams, the Sky selected 3rd in the Dispersal Draft.

Pick	Player	Nationality	College	Previous team
3	Mistie Williams	United States	Duke	Houston Comets

=== WNBA draft ===
Round	Pick	Player	Nationality	School/team/country
1	3	Kristi Toliver	United States	Maryland
1	16	Danielle Gant	United States	Texas A&M
3	29	Jenifer Risper	United States	Vanderbilt

=== Trades and Roster Changes ===
Date	Transaction
January 7, 2009	Signed Erin Thorn
January 12, 2009	Signed K.B. Sharp and Shyra Ely
April 15, 2009	Signed Kristi Toliver, Jennifer Risper, and Danielle Grant to their Rookie Scale Contracts
April 28, 2009	Signed Chen Nan
May 24, 2009	Waived Quianna Chaney and Danielle Grant
May 29, 2009	Waived Liz Moeggenberg
May 31, 2009	Exercised 4th-Year Team Option on Armintie Price
May 31, 2009	Waived Jennifer Risper
June 4, 2009	Waived Mistie Bass
August 12, 2009	Traded Armintie Price to the Atlanta Dream in exchange for Tamera Young
August 21, 2009	Waived Chen Nan
August 21, 2009	Signed Mistie Bass
September 1, 2009	Signed Katie Mattera to a 7-Day Contract
September 8, 2009	Waived Brooke Wyckoff
September 8, 2009	Signed Katie Mattera
September 11, 2009	Signed Jia Perkins to a Multi-Year Contract Extension

== Roster ==
2009 Chicago Sky roster
Players
Coaches

Pos.	No.	Nat.	Name	Height	Weight	From
F	8	(United States)	Bass, Mistie	6' 3" (1.91m)	184 lb (83kg)	Duke
G/F	3	(United States)	Canty, Dominique	5' 9" (1.75m)	162 lb (73kg)	Alabama
PF	4	(United States)	Dupree, Candice	6' 2" (1.88m)	162 lb (73kg)	Temple
SF	0	(United States)	Ely, Shyra	6' 2" (1.88m)	182 lb (83kg)	Tennessee
C	34	(United States)	Fowles, Sylvia	6' 6" (1.98m)	200 lb (91kg)	LSU
C	44	(United States)	Mattera, Katie	6' 8" (2.03m)	240 lb (109kg)	Liberty University
SG	11	(United States)	Perkins, Jia	5' 8" (1.73m)	155 lb (70kg)	Texas Tech
PG	32	(United States)	Sharp, K.B.	5' 9" (1.75m)	146 lb (66kg)	Cincinnati
SG	5	(United States)	Thorn, Erin	5' 10" (1.78m)	150 lb (68kg)	BYU
G	7	(United States)	Toliver, Kristi	5' 7" (1.7m)	130 lb (59kg)	Maryland
F	1	(United States)	Young, Tamera	6' 2" (1.88m)	175 lb (79kg)	James Madison University

Head coach
(United States) Steven Key (Boston University)
Assistant coaches
(United States) Stephanie White (Purdue)
(United States) Michael Mitchell (Fresno State)
Athletic trainer
(United States) Nick Rubel
Strength and conditioning coach
(United States) Ann Crosby

Legend

- (C) Team captain
- (DP) Unsigned draft pick
- (FA) Free agent
- (S) Suspended
- Injured

WNBA roster page

=== Depth ===
Pos.	Starter	Bench
C	Sylvia Fowles	Mistie Bass; Katie Mattera
PF	Candice Dupree	Shyra Ely
SF	Tamera Young	K.B. Sharp
SG	Jia Perkins	Erin Thorn
PG	Dominique Canty	Kristi Toliver

== Schedule ==
=== Preseason ===
2009 Preseason Schedule
Total: 2–2 (Home: 2–0; Road: 0–2

Game	Date	Time (ET)	Opponent	Score	High points	High rebounds	High assists	Location/Attendance	Record
1	May 22	8:30pm	Detroit	71-67	Sylvia Fowles (21)	Sylvia Fowles (9)	Jia Perkins (5)	UIC Pavilion; 3,283	1-0
2	May 27	11:00am	@ Detroit	68-78	Kristi Toliver (17)	Dupree; Bass (7)	Price; Toliver (3)	Palace of Auburn Hills; 3,952	1-1
3	May 28	7:00pm	@ Indiana	67-74	Dupree; Chen (15)	Shyra Ely (8)	Candice Dupree (3)	Conseco Fieldhouse; 6,457	1-2
4	June 2	8:00pm	E League	102-55	Candice Dupree (20)	Dupree; Fowles (7)	Kristi Toliver (6)	UIC Pavilion; 3,488	2-2

=== Regular season ===
2009 Regular Season
Total: 16–18 (Home: 12–5; Road: 4–13)
June: 6–3 (Home: 5–0; Road: 1–3)

Game	Date	Time (ET)	Opponent	TV	Score	High points	High rebounds	High assists	Location/Attendance	Record
1	June 6	8:00pm	@ Minnesota	NBA TV; FSN-N	85-102	Jia Perkins (24)	Jia Perkins (6)	Dominique Canty (6)	Target Center; 8,708	0-1
2	June 12	8:30pm	Atlanta	CN100; NBA TV	81-73	Candice Dupree (23)	Candice Dupree (8)	Jia Perkins (8)	UIC Pavilion; 5,689	1-1
3	June 14	6:00pm	Seattle		64-57	Candice Dupree (14)	Sylvia Fowles (15)	Brooke Wyckoff (3)	UIC Pavilion; 2,681	2-1
4	June 16	8:00pm	Connecticut		78-75	Jia Perkins (25)	Sylvia Fowles (10)	Jia Perkins (5)	UIC Pavilion; 2,396	3-1
5	June 19	7:00pm	@ Connecticut		61-91	Kristi Toliver (14)	Sylvia Fowles (9)	Armintie Price (3)	Mohegan Sun Arena; 5,892	3-2
6	June 20	7:00pm	@ Washington		72-81	Jia Perkins (15)	Armintie Price (7)	Jia Perkins (6)	Verizon Center; 11,745	3-3
7	June 23	12:00pm	@ Atlanta		99-98 (OT)	Jia Perkins (22)	Candice Dupree (10)	Jia Perkins (6)	Philips Arena; 10,351	4-3
8	June 27	8:00pm	Washington		68-63	Candice Dupree (23)	Sylvia Fowles (10)	Jia Perkins (5)	UIC Pavilion; 3,918	5-3
9	June 30	8:00pm	Sacramento		74-72	Jia Perkins (17)	Sylvia Fowles (14)	Jia Perkins (8)	UIC Pavilion; 2,721	6-3

July: 3–7 (Home: 2–2; Road: 1–5)

Game	Date	Time (ET)	Opponent	TV	Score	High points	High rebounds	High assists	Location/Attendance	Record
10	July 3	8:00pm	@ San Antonio		72-85	Armintie Price (17)	Shyra Ely (5)	Dominique Canty (5)	AT&T Center; 6,662	6-4
11	July 7	10:00pm	@ Sacramento		73-83	Jia Perkins (21)	Jia Perkins (5)	Jia Perkins (6)	ARCO Arena; 5,672	6-5
12	July 8	10:00pm	@ Phoenix		70-90	Candice Dupree (22)	Candice Dupree (12)	Armintie Price (2)	US Airways Center; 5,597	6-6
13	July 10	8:30pm	Indiana		54-83	Shyra Ely (12)	Candice Dupree (8)	Kristi Toliver (4)	UIC Pavilion; 4,021	6-7
14	July 12	9:00pm	@ Seattle	NBA TV; FSN-NW	86-81	Candice Dupree (28)	Candice Dupree (7)	Kristi Toliver (7)	KeyArena; 6,796	7-7
15	July 15	1:00pm	@ Indiana		74-84	Candice Dupree (17)	Candice Dupree (10)	Canty; Chen; Toliver (3)	Conseco Fieldhouse; 10,050	7-8
16	July 19	6:00pm	San Antonio	NBA TV; CN100	85-75	Jia Perkins (29)	Candice Dupree (11)	Dominique Canty (6)	UIC Pavilion; 3,282	8-8
17	July 22	12:30pm	New York		70-77	Sylvia Fowles (15)	Candice Dupree (11)	Dominique Canty (4)	UIC Pavilion; 5,881	8-9
18	July 23	7:00pm	@ Washington	ESPN2	64-75	Jia Perkins (14)	Sylvia Fowles (7)	Kristi Toliver (2)	Verizon Center; 11,651	8-10
19	July 29	8:00pm	Los Angeles		75-63	Jia Perkins (18)	Sylvia Fowles (7)	Candice Dupree (5)	UIC Pavilion; 5,633	9-10

August: 5–6 (Home: 3–2; Road: 2–4)

Game	Date	Time (ET)	Opponent	TV	Score	High points	High rebounds	High assists	Location/Attendance	Record
20	August 1	8:00pm	Connecticut	NBA TV; WCTX	84-72	Candice Dupree (23)	Candice Dupree (8)	Dominique Canty (6)	UIC Pavilion; 3,071	10-10
21	August 5	7:00pm	@ Indiana	NBA TV; CN100	67-76	Candice Dupree (19)	Candice Dupree (13)	Dominique Canty (4)	Conseco Fieldhouse; 6,581	10-11
22	August 8	7:00pm	@ Atlanta		82-80	Erin Thorn (20)	Candice Dupree (11)	Jia Perkins (5)	Philips Arena; 5,424	11-11
23	August 9	6:00pm	@ Detroit		58-64	Candice Dupree (16)	Sylvia Fowles (18)	Brooke Wyckoff (3)	Palace of Auburn Hills; 6,893	11-12
24	August 14	7:30pm	@ New York	NBA TV; CN100; MSG	88-77	Sylvia Fowles (22)	Dupree; Fowles (9)	Dominique Canty (6)	Madison Square Garden; 9,832	12-12
25	August 15	8:00pm	Minnesota		79-76	Erin Thorn (17)	Candice Dupree (14)	Dominique Canty (8)	UIC Pavilion; 3,877	13-12
26	August 18	8:00pm	Phoenix		99-106	Shyra Ely (26)	Candice Dupree (7)	Candice Dupree (5)	UIC Pavilion; TBA	13-13
27	August 22	8:00pm	Detroit		67-76	Candice Dupree (20)	Candice Dupree (14)	Canty; Dupree; Thorn (3)	UIC Pavilion; 5,167	13-14
28	August 25	10:00pm	@ Los Angeles	ESPN2	63-75	Shyra Ely (16)	Candice Dupree (8)	Dominique Canty (4)	STAPLES Center; 9,615	13-15
29	August 28	8:30pm	New York	NBA TV; CN100; MSG	96-77	Candice Dupree (26)	Candice Dupree (6)	Candice Dupree (4)	UIC Pavilion; 3,707	14-15
30	August 30	4:00pm	@ New York		63-77	Candice Dupree (15)	Candice Dupree (13)	Erin Thorn (7)	Madison Square Garden; 8,685	14-16

September: 2–2 (Home: 2–1; Road: 0–1)

Game	Date	Time (ET)	Opponent	TV	Score	High points	High rebounds	High assists	Location/Attendance	Record
31	September 4	8:30pm	Washington		92-86	Sylvia Fowles (13)	Candice Dupree (10)	Jia Perkins (5)	UIC Pavilion; 3,241	15-16
32	September 6	6:00pm	@ Detroit		75-84	Dupree; Ely (18)	Shyra Ely (8)	Ely; Sharp (3)	Palace of Auburn Hills; 6,619	15-17
33	September 10	8:00pm	Indiana		86-79	Kristi Toliver (19)	Candice Dupree (9)	Dominique Canty (6)	UIC Pavilion; 2,902	16-17
34	September 12	8:00pm	Detroit		69-80	Candice Dupree (27)	Candice Dupree (7)	Dominique Canty (6)	UIC Pavilion; 5,334	16-18

All games are viewable on WNBA LiveAccess

== Standings ==
Eastern Conference	W	L	PCT	GB	Home	Road	Conf.
Indiana Fever ^{x}	22	12	.647	–	14–3	8–9	17–5
Atlanta Dream ^{x}	18	16	.529	4.0	12–5	6–11	10–12
Detroit Shock ^{x}	18	16	.529	4.0	11–6	7–10	11–11
Washington Mystics ^{x}	16	18	.471	6.0	11–6	5–12	10–12
Chicago Sky ^{o}	16	18	.471	6.0	12–5	4–13	10–12
Connecticut Sun ^{o}	16	18	.471	6.0	12–5	4–13	9–12
New York Liberty ^{o}	13	21	.382	9.0	8–9	5–12	8–13

== Statistics ==
Legend
GP	Games played	GS	Games started	MPG	Minutes per game	RPG	Rebounds per game
APG	Assists per game	SPG	Steals per game	BPG	Blocks per game	PPG	Points per game
FG%	Field-goal percentage	3P%	3-point field-goal percentage	FT%	Free-throw percentage	TO	Turnovers per game
PF	Fouls per game		Team leader		League leader

=== Regular season ===
Player	GP	GS	MPG	FG%	3P%	FT%	RPG	APG	SPG	BPG	PPG
Candice Dupree	34	34	34.9	42.9	38.7	78.5	7.9	2.2	1.0	1.2	15.7
Jia Perkins	34	34	27.4	41.7	38.5	84.6	3.4	2.9	2.1	0.2	13.2
Sylvia Fowles	24	20	28.8	59.9	0.0	64.6	7.8	0.8	0.9	1.5	11.3
Kristi Toliver	27	0	14.3	45.3	44.4	91.3	1.4	1.9	0.4	0.1	7.6
Dominique Canty	34	34	22.8	38.1	36.4	68.9	1.9	3.2	0.8	0.1	6.9
Shyra Ely	34	9	14.6	41.8	38.3	80.4	2.6	0.6	0.4	0.2	6.8
Erin Thorn	34	0	17.0	42.4	40.2	90.9	1.6	1.6	0.6	0.0	6.2
Mistie Bass	8	5	15.8	51.3	0.0	56.3	3.4	0.4	0.6	0.4	6.1
Katie Mattera	2	0	11.5	75.0	0.0	83.3	3.0	0.0	0.0	0.5	5.5
Tamera Young	10	6	12.9	34.8	25.0	88.9	3.0	0.7	0.7	0.4	5.0
Chen Nan	26	5	12.3	48.4	0.0	62.5	2.1	0.2	0.3	0.3	3.7
Armintie Price	22	0	14.7	38.6	0.0	57.5	2.7	1.2	0.5	0.0	3.5
Brooke Wyckoff	27	23	19.7	37.8	39.2	87.5	2.7	1.4	0.4	0.7	3.1
K.B. Sharp	27	0	12.0	40.4	35.3	94.7	0.7	0.9	0.3	0.1	2.6

== Awards and honors ==
Recipient	Award	Date awarded	Ref.
Candice Dupree	Eastern Conference Player of the Week	June 15	
Candice Dupree	WNBA All-Star Starter	July 14	
Sylvia Fowles	WNBA All-Star Starter	July 14	
Jia Perkins	WNBA All-Star Selection	July 20	
