= 2009 Detroit Shock season =

- Head coach: Bill Laimbeer (1-3); Rick Mahorn (17-13)
- Arena: Palace of Auburn Hills

Results
- Record: 18–16 (.529)
- Place: 3rd (Eastern)
- Playoff finish: Lost Conference Finals

The 2009 WNBA season was the 12th for the Detroit Shock of the Women's National Basketball Association in the United States. The Shock attempted to win the WNBA Finals, tying the record for most championships with the Houston Comets (4 but failed in the conference finals. On June 15, 2009, head coach Bill Laimbeer resigned as head coach of the Detroit Shock, due to family reasons and the desire to become an NBA head coach. Though he was unable to secure an NBA head coaching position, ESPN reported on August 30 that Laimbeer was offered, and accepted, an assistant coach position with the Minnesota Timberwolves. The Shock is able to overcome the early struggles, and in 2008 championship Detroit Shock reached the playoffs in its seventh straight year. It was their final year in Detroit, as the Shock were purchased by Tulsa Hoops, and new ownership moved the team to Tulsa for 2010.

== Offseason ==
=== Dispersal Draft ===
Based on the Shock's 2008 record, they could have picked 11th in the Houston Comets dispersal draft. However, the Shock waived their pick.

=== WNBA draft ===
The following are the Shock's selections in the 2009 WNBA draft.

Round	Pick	Player	Nationality	School/Team/Country
1	11	Shavonte Zellous	United States	Pittsburgh
2	18 (from Phx. via Atl.)	Britany Miller	United States	Florida State
3	37	Tanae Davis-Cain	United States	Florida State

=== Transactions ===
- August 18: The Shock signed Nikki Teasley after Barbara Farris' seven-day contract expired.
- August 17: The Shock acquired Crystal Kelly from the Sacramento Monarchs in exchange for Kristin Haynie.
- August 4: The Shock signed Barbara Farris after Anna DeForge's seven-day contract expired.
- July 27: The Shock signed Anna DeForge.
- July 23: The Shock waived Anna DeForge.
- July 10: The Shock signed Anna DeForge.
- July 6: The Shock waived Barbara Farris.
- June 28: The Shock terminated the replacement contract of Sherill Baker.
- June 26: The Shock signed Sherill Baker to a replacement contract.
- June 18: The Shock terminated the replacement contract of Kelly Schumacher due to the return of Cheryl Ford.
- June 15: The Shock announced the resignation of Bill Laimbeer. Assistant coach Rick Mahorn was promoted to head coach, while assistant coach Cheryl Reeve took over general management duties.
- June 10: The Shock terminated Britany Miller's replacement contract and signed Kelly Schumacher to a replacement contract.
- June 8: The Shock signed Britany Miller to a replacement contract.
- June 3: The Shock waived Kristen Rasmussen, Tiera DeLaHoussaye, Britany Miller, and Sequoia Holmes.
- May 28: The Shock signed Barbara Farris.
- May 27: The Shock waived Tanae Davis-Cain.
- May 18: The Shock signed Kristen Rasmussen and Sequoia Holmes.
- April 22: The Shock signed Kristin Haynie.
- April 16: The Shock signed Tiera DeLaHoussaye to a training camp contract.
- April 9: The Shock traded Ashley Shields to the Atlanta Dream in exchange for the 18th pick in the 2009 WNBA Draft.
- January 30: The Shock signed Ashley Shields to a training-camp contract.
- January 9: The Shock re-signed free agent Kara Braxton.
- August 19, 2008: The Shock signed Taj McWilliams-Franklin to a one-year extension.
- August 12, 2008: The Shock traded their second-round 2009 WNBA Draft pick to the Washington Mystics as part of the Taj McWilliams-Franklin acquisition.

Date	Trade	
April 9, 2009	To Detroit Shock	To Atlanta Dream
April 9, 2009	18th pick in 2009 Draft	Ashley Shields

=== Free agents ===
==== Additions ====
Player	Signed	Former team
Taj McWilliams-Franklin	August 19, 2008	re-signed
Kara Braxton	January 9, 2009	re-signed
Kristin Haynie	April 22, 2009	Atlanta Dream
Crystal Kelly	August 17, 2009	Sacramento Monarchs
Nikki Teasley	August 18, 2009	free agent

==== Subtractions ====
Player	Left	New team
Ashley Shields	April 9, 2009	free agent
Tanae Davis-Cain	May 27, 2009	free agent
Britany Miller	June 3, 2009	free agent
Kristin Haynie	August 17, 2009	Sacramento Monarchs
Sheri Sam	2009	free agent
Elaine Powell	2009	free agent
Kelly Schumacher	2009	free agent

== Roster ==
2009 Detroit Shock roster
Players
Coaches

Pos.	No.	Nat.	Name	Height	Weight	From
C	45	(United States)	Braxton, Kara	6' 6" (1.98m)	190 lb (86kg)	Georgia
PF	35	(United States)	Ford, Cheryl	6' 3" (1.91m)	195 lb (88kg)	Louisiana Tech
SG	22	(United States)	Hornbuckle, Alexis	5' 11" (1.8m)	155 lb (70kg)	Tennessee
F	42	(United States)	Kelly, Crystal	6' 2" (1.88m)	190 lb (86kg)	Western Kentucky
C	44	(United States)	McWilliams, Taj	6' 2" (1.88m)	184 lb (83kg)	St. Edward's University
SG	14	(United States)	Nolan, Deanna	5' 11" (1.8m)	147 lb (67kg)	Georgia
SF	23	(United States)	Pierson, Plenette (injured)	6' 2" (1.88m)	178 lb (81kg)	Texas Tech
C	24	(United States)	Sanni, Olayinka	6' 2" (1.88m)	205 lb (93kg)	West Virginia
G/F	30	(United States)	Smith, Katie	5' 11" (1.8m)	175 lb (79kg)	Ohio State
G	6	(United States)	Teasley, Nikki	6' 0" (1.83m)	169 lb (77kg)	North Carolina
G	1	(United States)	Zellous, Shavonte	5' 10" (1.78m)	155 lb (70kg)	Pittsburgh

Head coach
(United States) Rick Mahorn (Hampton)
Assistant coaches
(United States) Earl Cureton (Detroit Mercy)
(United States) Cheryl Reeve (La Salle)
Athletic trainer
(United States) Laura Ramus (Wayne State (MI))
Strength and conditioning coach
(United States) Laura Ramus (Wayne State (MI))

Legend

- (C) Team captain
- (DP) Unsigned draft pick
- (FA) Free agent
- (S) Suspended
- Injured

WNBA roster page

== Season standings ==
Eastern Conference	W	L	PCT	GB	Home	Road	Conf.
Indiana Fever ^{x}	22	12	.647	–	14–3	8–9	17–5
Atlanta Dream ^{x}	18	16	.529	4.0	12–5	6–11	10–12
Detroit Shock ^{x}	18	16	.529	4.0	11–6	7–10	11–11
Washington Mystics ^{x}	16	18	.471	6.0	11–6	5–12	10–12
Chicago Sky ^{o}	16	18	.471	6.0	12–5	4–13	10–12
Connecticut Sun ^{o}	16	18	.471	6.0	12–5	4–13	9–12
New York Liberty ^{o}	13	21	.382	9.0	8–9	5–12	8–13

== Schedule ==
=== Preseason ===
2009 Game Log: Preseason

Game	Date	Time (ET)	Opponent	Score	High points	High rebounds	High assists	Location/Attendance	Record
1	May 22	7:30pm	@ Chicago	67-71	Hornbuckle (14)	Miller (10)	DeLaHoussaye (5)	UIC Pavilion; 3,283	0-1
2	May 27	11:00am	Chicago	78-68	Zellous (18)	Zellous (8)	Smith (5)	Palace of Auburn Hills; 3,952	1-1
3	May 30	7:00pm	San Antonio	62-55	Zellous (13)	Sanni (6)	Hornbuckle (3)	Traverse City West H.S. 2,109	2-1

=== Regular season ===
2009 Game Log: Regular Season
June

Game	Date	Time (ET)	Opponent	TV	Score	High points	High rebounds	High assists	Location/Attendance	Record
1	June 6	2:30pm	@ Los Angeles	ABC	58-78	Nolan (15)	Smith (7)	McWilliams (4)	STAPLES Center; 13,154	0-1
2	June 8	7:30pm	Los Angeles		81-52	Nolan (27)	Hornbuckle, McWilliams (7)	Haynie, Hornbuckle, Smith (3)	Palace of Auburn Hills; 13,915	1-1
3	June 10	7:30pm	Washington		69-75	Smith, McWilliams (14)	Sanni, Zellous (7)	Nolan (6)	Palace of Auburn Hills; 7,329	1-2
4	June 19	7:30pm	Indiana		54-66	Nolan (13)	Hornbuckle, McWilliams (10)	Hornbuckle, Nolan, Smith (2)	Palace of Auburn Hills; 7,725	1-3
5	June 21	6:00pm	@ Indiana	NBA TV; FSI	70-82	Nolan (16)	Nolan (8)	Nolan (6)	Conseco Fieldhouse; 7,610	1-4
6	June 26	7:30pm	@ Atlanta		86-96	Zellous (25)	McWilliams (9)	McWilliams, Nolan (2)	Philips Arena; 5,935	1-5
7	June 28	6:00pm	Sacramento		86-72	Zellous (18)	Ford (8)	McWilliams, Smith (3)	Palace of Auburn Hills; 7,277	2-5

July

Game	Date	Time (ET)	Opponent	TV	Score	High points	High rebounds	High assists	Location/Attendance	Record
8	July 2	7:30pm	@ New York	MSG	64-80	Ford (13)	Ford, Hornbuckle (10)	Smith (5)	Madison Square Garden; 8,018	2-6
9	July 5	6:00pm	Connecticut		92-95 (OT)	Smith (28)	Hornbuckle (12)	McWilliams (5)	Palace of Auburn Hills; 6,981	2-7
10	July 11	7:00pm	@ Connecticut	NBA TV; WCTX	79-77 (OT)	Smith (25)	Braxton (13)	Smith (3)	Mohegan Sun Arena; 6,342	3-7
11	July 15	10:00pm	@ Seattle	NBA TV; FSN-NW	66-62	Smith (19)	Ford (8)	Nolan (7)	KeyArena; 6,821	4-7
12	July 18	10:00pm	@ Phoenix		90-97	Smith (21)	McWilliams (12)	Smith (5)	US Airways Center; 8,288	4-8
13	July 19	9:00pm	@ Sacramento		69-65	McWilliams (21)	McWilliams (12)	Braxton, Nolan, Smith, Zellous (3)	ARCO Arena; 7,538	5-8
14	July 22	12:00pm	Atlanta		95-98 (OT)	Braxton (25)	Braxton (12)	Nolan (9)	Palace of Auburn Hills; 14,439	5-9
15	July 31	7:30pm	Minnesota		91-83	Nolan (22)	Ford (9)	McWilliams, Nolan (9)	Palace of Auburn Hills; 9,314	6-9

August

Game	Date	Time (ET)	Opponent	TV	Score	High points	High rebounds	High assists	Location/Attendance	Record
16	August 2	6:00pm	Connecticut		65-83	Nolan (20)	Ford (9)	Nolan (4)	Palace of Auburn Hills; 7,814	6-10
17	August 4	7:30pm	New York	ESPN2	76-64	Nolan (26)	Nolan (14)	McWilliams, Nolan, Smith (4)	Palace of Auburn Hills; 7,081	7-10
18	August 7	7:00pm	@ Washington		66-70	Braxton (14)	McWilliams (7)	Nolan (6)	Verizon Center; 10,637	7-11
19	August 9	6:00pm	Chicago		64-58	Zellous (19)	McWilliams (12)	Smith (4)	Palace of Auburn Hills; 6,893	8-11
20	August 11	7:00pm	@ Washington		81-77	Nolan (23)	McWilliams (13)	McWilliams, Zellous (4)	Verizon Center; 10,398	9-11
21	August 13	7:30pm	@ Atlanta		75-80	Nolan (20)	McWilliams (10)	McWilliams (5)	Philips Arena; 5,641	9-12
22	August 15	7:00pm	@ Indiana		59-82	Zellous (16)	Braxton (10)	McWilliams, Zellous (3)	Conseco Fieldhouse; 9,963	9-13
23	August 18	7:30pm	Seattle		75-79	Nolan (29)	McWilliams (8)	Smith (5)	Palace of Auburn Hills; 7,392	9-14
24	August 22	8:00pm	@ Chicago		76-67	Smith (10)	Ford (9)	4 players (4)	UIC Pavilion; 5,167	10-14
25	August 23	6:00pm	San Antonio		99-87	Smith (31)	McWilliams, Nolan (7)	Hornbuckle (7)	Palace of Auburn Hills; 7,130	11-14
26	August 25	7:00pm	@ Connecticut		90-70	Smith (19)	Kelly (8)	Zellous (5)	Mohegan Sun Arena; 6,811	12-14
27	August 27	7:30pm	Atlanta		87-83	Nolan (29)	Ford (12)	Hornbuckle (5)	Palace of Auburn Hills; 5,695	13-14
28	August 29	3:00pm	@ San Antonio	ESPN2	88-100 (OT)	Nolan (34)	Braxton (7)	Teasley (5)	AT&T Center; 7,735	13-15

September

Game	Date	Time (ET)	Opponent	TV	Score	High points	High rebounds	High assists	Location/Attendance	Record
29	September 1	7:30pm	Phoenix		101-99	Ford (22)	Ford (11)	Teasley, Zellous (5)	Palace of Auburn Hills; 5,239	14-15
30	September 4	7:30pm	Indiana		70-63 (OT)	Nolan (22)	Ford (12)	Nolan (4)	Palace of Auburn Hills; 7,230	15-15
31	September 6	6:00pm	Chicago		84-75	Nolan (19)	Nolan (8)	Braxton, Hornbuckle, Nolan (4)	Palace of Auburn Hills; 6,619	16-15
32	September 9	8:00pm	@ Minnesota		72-75	Ford (16)	Ford (12)	Ford, Teasley, Zellous (4)	Target Center; 7,423	16-16
33	September 10	7:30pm	New York	NBA TV; MSG	94-87 (OT)	Nolan (34)	Braxton, McWilliams (8)	Hornbuckle, Zellous (5)	Palace of Auburn Hills; 8,178	17-16
34	September 12	8:00pm	@ Chicago		80-69	Zellous (20)	McWilliams (10)	Nolan, Zellous (4)	UIC Pavilion; 5,334	18-16

All games are viewable on WNBA LiveAccess

=== Postseason ===
2009 Game Log: Postseason
Eastern Conference Semifinals

Game	Date	Time (ET)	Opponent	TV	Score	High points	High rebounds	High assists	Location/Attendance	Series
1	September 16	8:00pm	Atlanta	ESPN2	94-89	Nolan (25)	Ford (10)	Hornbuckle (5)	Palace of Auburn Hills; 6,122	1-0
2	September 18	7:30pm	@ Atlanta	NBA TV	94-79	Nolan (22)	Braxton, Hornbuckle (8)	Braxton, Nolan (5)	Gwinnett Arena; 4,780	2-0

Eastern Conference Finals

Game	Date	Time (ET)	Opponent	TV	Score	High points	High rebounds	High assists	Location/Attendance	Series
1	September 23	8:00pm	Indiana	ESPN2	72-56	Zellous (23)	Braxton, Ford (9)	Zellous (5)	Palace of Auburn Hills; 7,214	1-0
2	September 25	7:00pm	@ Indiana	NBA TV	75-79	Nolan (23)	Ford (13)	Hornbuckle, Nolan, Zellous (3)	Conseco Fieldhouse; 9,210	1-1
3	September 26	7:00pm	@ Indiana	NBA TV	67-72	Nolan (16)	Ford (11)	Hornbuckle, McWilliams, Nolan (4)	Conseco Fieldhouse; 18,165	1-2

== Regular season statistics ==
Legend
GP	Games played	GS	Games started	MPG	Minutes per game	RPG	Rebounds per game
APG	Assists per game	SPG	Steals per game	BPG	Blocks per game	PPG	Points per game
FG%	Field-goal percentage	3P%	3-point field-goal percentage	FT%	Free-throw percentage	TO	Turnovers per game
PF	Fouls per game		Team leader		League leader

=== Player statistics ===
Player	GP	GS	MPG	RPG	APG	SPG	BPG	PPG
Sherill Baker	1	0	11.0	1.0	1.0	1.00	0.00	7.0
Kara Braxton	28	2	18.0	6.0	1.5	0.68	0.64	9.0
Barbara Farris	13	3	8.5	1.4	0.4	0.38	0.00	1.3
Tanae Davis-Cain	1	0	4.0	2.0	0.0	0.00	0.00	2.0
Anna DeForge	7	7	16.1	2.9	1.4	0.57	0.00	1.4
Cheryl Ford	29	29	26.0	7.4	0.9	0.97	0.45	8.6
Kristin Haynie	20	2	8.1	1.3	0.6	0.70	0.00	2.2
Alexis Hornbuckle	32	21	26.6	4.9	2.7	1.31	0.28	6.7
Crystal Kelly	11	0	7.6	1.3	0.4	0.36	0.09	2.8
Taj McWilliams	34	34	30.4	6.6	2.9	0.97	0.47	9.8
Britany Miller	1	0	8.0	0.0	0.0	1.00	0.00	0.0
Deanna Nolan	33	33	33.7	4.3	3.5	1.33	0.30	16.9
Plenette Pierson	1	0	5.0	0.0	0.0	1.00	1.00	0.0
Olayinka Sanni	31	1	9.6	1.8	0.5	0.35	0.16	3.8
Kelly Schumacher	1	0	10.0	0.0	0.0	0.00	1.00	0.0
Katie Smith	27	27	33.1	2.3	2.8	0.78	0.07	13.7
Nikki Teasley	11	7	20.2	1.3	2.2	0.55	0.36	3.8
Shavonte Zellous	34	4	23.6	3.1	1.8	0.79	0.50	11.9

=== Team statistics ===
Team	FG%	3P%	FT%	RPG	APG	SPG	BPG	TO	PF	PPG
Detroit Shock	.430	.351	.748	36.1	16.9	7.7	2.8	16.1	22.5	78.0
Opponents	.410	.340	.777	32.4	15.4	8.2	3.2	15.6	21.1	77.8

== Awards and honors ==
- Deanna Nolan was named WNBA Eastern Conference Player of the Week for the week of August 24, 2009.
- Deanna Nolan was named WNBA Eastern Conference Player of the Week for the week of August 31, 2009.
- Deanna Nolan was named WNBA Eastern Conference Player of the Week for the week of September 7, 2009.
- Katie Smith was named to the 2009 WNBA All-Star Team as an Eastern Conference reserve.
- Shavonte Zellous was named to the All-Rookie Team.
- Deanna Nolan was named to the All-WNBA Second Team.
- Deanna Nolan was named to the All-Defensive Second Team.
