= Queenan =

Queenan is a surname of Irish origin. Notable people with the surname include:

- Brooke Queenan (born 1984), American basketball player
- Daren Queenan (born 1966), American basketball player
- Joe Queenan (born 1950), American journalist and writer
- Oliver Queenan, fictional character
