= 2007 Indiana Fever season =

8th season in the WNBA

- Head coach: Brian Winters
- Arena: Conseco Fieldhouse

Results
- Record: 21–13 (.618)
- Place: 2nd (Eastern)
- Playoff finish: Eliminated 2–1 by Detroit, Eastern Conference Finals

Media
- Television: FSN Indiana

The 2007 Indiana Fever season was the franchise's 8th season in the WNBA and their 4th season under head coach, Brian Winters. They finished 2nd in the Eastern Conference with 21 wins and 13 losses on the season. The season marked the third consecutive season that the Fever earned a playoff berth. They eliminated the Connecticut Sun, 2–1, in the First Round of the playoffs but then in turn were eliminated in the Eastern Conference Finals, 2–1, by the Detroit Shock.

== Offseason ==
On March 23, 2007, the Fever signed Tammy Sutton-Brown from the defunct Charlotte Sting, Sutton-Brown was one of the most sought-after free agents.

The following player was selected in the Dispersal Draft from the Charlotte Sting:

- Sheri Sam

=== 2007 WNBA draft ===
Indiana's selections from the 2008 WNBA draft in Cleveland.

Round	Pick	Player	Position	Nationality	School/club team
1	9	Alison Bales	Center	United States	Duke
2	22	Lyndsey Medders	Point guard	United States	Iowa State
3	35	Ashley Key	Shooting guard	United States	N.C. State

== Roster ==
2007 Indiana Fever roster
Players
Coaches

Pos.	No.	Nat.	Name	Height	Weight	From
C	43	(United States)	Bales, Alison	6' 7" (2.01m)	218 lb (99kg)	Duke
PG	41	(Australia)	Bevilaqua, Tully	5' 7" (1.7m)	145 lb (66kg)	Australia
SF	24	(United States)	Catchings, Tamika (injured) (C)	6' 2" (1.88m)	167 lb (76kg)	Tennessee
SG	30	(United States)	DeForge, Anna	5' 10" (1.78m)	160 lb (73kg)	Nebraska
PF	32	(United States)	Hoffman, Ebony	6' 2" (1.88m)	215 lb (98kg)	USC
SF	55	(United States)	Sam, Sheri	6' 0" (1.83m)	160 lb (73kg)	Vanderbilt
PG	3	(United States)	Sharp, K.B.	5' 9" (1.75m)	149 lb (68kg)	Cincinnati
SG	7	(United States)	Strother, Ann	6' 3" (1.91m)	166 lb (75kg)	Connecticut
C	8	(Canada)	Sutton-Brown, Tammy	6' 4" (1.93m)	200 lb (91kg)	Rutgers
C	35	(United States)	Terry, Kasha	6' 3" (1.91m)	185 lb (84kg)	Georgia Tech
SG	15	(United States)	White, Tan	5' 7" (1.7m)	154 lb (70kg)	Mississippi State
PF	91	(United States)	Whitmore, Tamika	6' 2" (1.88m)	190 lb (86kg)	Memphis

Head coach
(United States) Brian Winters (South Carolina)
Assistant coaches
(United States) Lin Dunn (UT Martin)
(United States) Julie Plank (Ohio State)
Athletic trainer
(United States) Holly Heitzman (Syracuse)
Strength and conditioning coach
(United States) Greg Moore (University of Sioux Falls)

Legend

- (C) Team captain
- (DP) Unsigned draft pick
- (FA) Free agent
- (S) Suspended
- Injured

=== Depth ===
Pos.	Starter	Bench	Reserve	Inactive
C	Tammy Sutton-Brown	Alison Bales
PF	Tamika Whitmore	Ebony Hoffman		Kasha Terry
SF	Tamika Catchings	Sheri Sam
SG	Anna DeForge	Tan White	Ann Strother
PG	Tully Bevilaqua	K. B. Sharp

== Season standings ==
Eastern Conference	W	L	PCT	GB	Home	Road	Conf.
Detroit Shock ^{x}	24	10	.706	–	12–5	12–5	14–6
Indiana Fever ^{x}	21	13	.618	3.0	12–5	9–8	12–8
Connecticut Sun ^{x}	18	16	.529	6.0	8–9	10–7	10–10
New York Liberty ^{x}	16	18	.471	8.0	10–7	6–11	10–10
Washington Mystics ^{o}	16	18	.471	8.0	8–9	8–9	8–12
Chicago Sky ^{o}	14	20	.412	10.0	6–11	8–9	6–14

== Schedule ==
=== Preseason ===
Game	Date	Opponent	Score/Time	High points	High rebounds	High assists	Arena/Attendance	Record
1	May 5	Seattle	75–58	Catchings (18)	Catchings (8)	Bevilaqua (8)	Conseco Fieldhouse; 3,033	1–0
2	May 10	Los Angeles	L 81–76	Catchings, DeForge (13)	Hoffman (9)	Catchings (6)	Conseco Fieldhouse; 4,044	1–1
3	May 15	Chicago	W 60–55	Catchings (16)	Catchings (8)	Bevilaqua (6)	UIC Pavilion; 3,005	2–1

=== Regular season ===
Game	Date	Opponent	Score/Time	High points	High rebounds	High assists	Arena/Attendance	Record
1	May 19	Minnesota	W 83–64	White (17)	Catchings (7)	Catchings (4)	Conseco Fieldhouse; 9,210	1–0
2	May 24	Los Angeles	W 83–70	Catchings (24)	Catchings (8)	Catchings (5)	Conseco Fieldhouse; 5,058	2–0
3	May 29	@ Minnesota	W 89–75	Catchings (21)	Hoffman (7)	Catchings (6)	Target Center; 6,238	3–0
4	June 3	Washington	W 70–66	White (20)	Catchings (9)	DeForge (4)	Conseco Fieldhouse; 6,972	4–0
5	June 5	@ New York	L 78–67	Catchings (21)	Whitmore (8)	Catchings (9)	Madison Square Garden; 7,282	4–1
6	June 6	Houston	W 84–59	Sutton-Brown (17)	Catchings (7)	Sharp (6)	Conseco Fieldhouse; 5,909	5–1
7	June 8	@ Washington	W 74–69	Catchings (24)	Catchings (12)	Bevilaqua (5)	Verizon Center; 7,110	6–1
8	June 10	New York	W 80–61	Sutton-Brown, Whitmore (22)	Sutton-Brown (13)	Bevilaqua, Catchings (4)	Conseco Fieldhouse; 6,938	7–1
9	June 13	Seattle	W 90–62	White (23)	Catchings (10)	Whitmore (5)	Conseco Fieldhouse; 5,838	8–1
10	June 15	Phoenix	L 89–78	Catchings, Sutton-Brown (17)	Catchings (15)	Bevilaqua (4)	Conseco Fieldhouse; 6,579	8–2
11	June 16	@ Detroit	W 77–67	Catchings (26)	Catchings (14)	Whitmore (4)	Palace of Auburn Hills; 8,812	9–2
12	June 22	Connecticut	L 78–74	White, Whitmore (15)	Catchings (12)	Catchings (7)	Conseco Fieldhouse; 7,240	9–3
13	June 24	@ New York	W 74–63	Catchings (18)	Sutton-Brown (7)	Catchings (6)	Madison Square Garden; 7,554	10–3
14	June 29	@ Connecticut	L 72–67	Whitmore (13)	Catchings (11)	Sutton-Brown (5)	Mohegan Sun Arena; 7,617	10–4
15	July 1	@ Washington	W 69–62	Catchings, White (14)	White (8)	Catchings (3)	Verizon Center; 7,233	11–4
16	July 5	@ Los Angeles	W 57–56	Catchings (17)	Catchings (11)	Catchings (5)	Staples Center; 8,262	12–4
17	July 8	Chicago	W 86–70	Catchings (16)	Catchings (7)	Catchings (1)	Conseco Fieldhouse; 8,247	13–4
18	July 10	@ Houston	W 79–77	Catchings (23)	Catchings, Sutton-Brown (6)	Catchings (5)	Toyota Center; 7,226	14–4
19	July 12	New York	W 79–63	White (16)	Catchings (10)	Catchings (5)	Conseco Fieldhouse; 7,095	15–4
20	July 18	Chicago	W 75–74	Catchings (22)	Catchings (13)	Catchings (6)	Conseco Fieldhouse; 10,542	16–4
21	July 20	Detroit	L 89–90	Sutton-Brown (16)	Catchings (8)	Catchings (7)	Conseco Fieldhouse; 9,210	16–5
22	July 21	@ Chicago	L 68–65	Whitmore (26)	Bevilaqua, DeForge (5)	Bevilaqua (5)	UIC Pavilion; 3,383	16–6
23	July 24	San Antonio	L 71–63 (OT)	DeForge (15)	Sutton-Brown (6)	Sam (6)	Conseco Fieldhouse; 6,028	16–7
24	July 26	@ Sacramento	L 60–50	White (14)	Hoffman (8)	Bevilaqua, Hoffman, Sam, Sharp, Whitmore (2)	Arco Arena; 13,320	16–8
25	July 27	@ Seattle	L 89–75	DeForge (12)	Sutton-Brown (5)	White (4)	KeyArena; 8,052	16–9
26	July 29	@ Phoenix	L 80–75	White (25)	Sutton-Brown (9)	Bevilaqua (5)	US Airways Center; 7,495	16–10
27	July 31	Washington	W 66–57	White (20)	Whitmore (15)	Bevilaqua (4)	Conseco Fieldhouse; 6,012	17–10
28	August 4	@ Connecticut	L 84–59	Sharp (14)	Sutton-Brown (8)	Sam (4)	Mohegan Sun Arena; 9,493	17–11
29	August 5	Sacramento	W 63–55	Whitmore (16)	Hoffman, Sutton-Brown, White (6)	Bevilaqua, DeForge (4)	Conseco Fieldhouse; 6,645	18–11
30	August 7	@ Chicago	W 75–70 (2OT)	DeForge (16)	DeForge (9)	White (5)	UIC Pavilion; 5,029	19–11
31	August 11	@ Detroit	L 74–69	White (15)	DeForge (7)	White (4)	Palace of Auburn Hills; 10,857	19–12
32	August 15	Connecticut	L 77–74	DeForge (29)	Sutton-Brown (10)	White (4)	Conseco Fieldhouse; 6,433	19–13
33	August 17	@ San Antonio	W 59–55	Whitmore (12)	Sam (7)	Sharp (3)	AT&T Center; 8,952	20–13
34	August 19	Detroit	W 72–66	Whitmore (18)	DeForge (8)	Bevilaqua (6)	Conseco Fieldhouse; 8,899	21–13

=== Playoffs ===
==== First round ====
Game	Date	Opponent	Score/Time	High points	High rebounds	High assists	Arena/Attendance	Series
1	August 23	@ Connecticut	L 93–88 (3OT)	DeForge (31)	Catchings (20)	Catchings (7)	Mohegan Sun Arena; 7,271	Sun 1–0
2	August 25	Connecticut	W 78–59	DeForge (26)	Catchings (13)	White, Whitmore (4)	Conseco Fieldhouse; 7,298	Tied 1–1
3	August 27	Connecticut	W 93–88	Catchings (30)	Catchings (13)	Catchings (6)	Conseco Fieldhouse; 6,012	Fever win 2–1

==== Eastern Conference Finals ====
Game	Date	Opponent	Score/Time	High points	High rebounds	High assists	Arena/Attendance	Series
1	August 31	Detroit	W 75–65	Catchings (22)	Catchings (10)	Bevilaqua (4)	Conseco Fieldhouse; 9,623	Fever 1–0
2	September 2	@ Detroit	L 77–63	DeForge (13)	Catchings, DeForge, Sam (4)	Whitmore (4)	Palace of Auburn Hills; 10,153	Tied 1–1
3	September 3	@ Detroit	L 81–65	Sutton-Brown (17)	Sutton-Brown, Sam (10)	Sam, Whitmore (4)	Palace of Auburn Hills; 9,856	Shock win 2–1

== Awards and records ==
=== Awards ===
- Kim Perrot Sportsmanship Award: Tully Bevilaqua

== Player stats ==
Legend
GP	Games played	GS	Games started	MPG	Minutes per game
FG%	Field-goal percentage	3P%	3-point field-goal percentage	FT%	Free-throw percentage
RPG	Rebounds per game	APG	Assists per game	SPG	Steals per game
BPG	Blocks per game	PPG	Points per game

=== Season ===
Player	GP	GS	MPG	FG%	3FG%	FT%	RPG	APG	SPG	BPG	PPG
Alison Bales	17	0	9.9	.571	.000	.875	2.6	.1	.24	.76	3.2
Tully Bevilaqua	34	34	26.5	.440	.371	.682	2.2	2.7	1.65	.06	5.3
Tamika Catchings	21	21	32.3	.417	.311	.820	9.0	4.7	3.14	1.05	16.6
Anna DeForge	34	34	23.4	.418	.410	.906	3.3	1.5	.76	.12	8.7
Ebony Hoffman	34	10	17.1	.445	.400	.824	4.0	.8	.62	.53	4.2
Sheri Sam	33	4	17.9	.339	.273	.690	2.9	1.3	.88	.18	5.0
K.B. Sharp	34	0	13.4	.412	.286	.724	.90	1.4	.38	.00	3.2
Ann Strother	12	0	5.8	.323	.400	1.000	.8	.3	.00	.00	2.3
Tammy Sutton-Brown	34	33	25.3	.485	.000	.716	5.4	.9	1.03	1.38	12.0
Kasha Terry	9	0	6.0	.250	.000	.750	1.6	.1	.22	.33	1.0
Tan White	34	9	24.7	.386	.339	.841	2.6	1.9	1.06	.29	10.8
Tamika Whitmore	34	25	25.9	.415	.300	.763	5.0	1.5	.59	.32	10.9

=== Playoffs ===
Player	GP	GS	MPG	FG%	3FG%	FT%	RPG	APG	SPG	BPG	PPG
Alison Bales	4	0	4.3	.000	.000	.000	.5	.3	.00	.00	0.0
Tully Bevilaqua	6	6	35.8	.295	.286	.833	2.70	3.2	1.83	.00	7.3
Tamika Catchings	6	6	32.7	.370	.263	.878	11.0	3.2	2.17	.50	15.8
Anna DeForge	6	6	32.8	.467	.393	1.000	3.7	1.0	1.33	.17	16.8
Ebony Hoffman	4	0	10.5	.417	.000	.00	2.3	.3	.00	.25	2.5
Sheri Sam	6	5	30.8	.373	.500	.500	5.3	2.2	1.00	.17	8.0
K.B. Sharp	6	0	7.7	.100	.00	.833	.80	.5	.17	.00	1.2
Ann Strother	3	0	5.0	.429	.333	.000	1.0	.7	.33	.00	2.3
Tammy Sutton-Brown	6	6	20.5	.349	.000	.571	4.70	.7	.17	2.00	7.0
Kasha Terry	0	0	0.0	.000	.000	.000	.0	.0	.00	.00	0.0
Tan White	5	1	16.4	.267	.167	.000	1.8	2.0	1.0	.40	1.8
Tamika Whitmore	6	0	30.7	.448	.565	.615	5.3	2.7	.50	.17	16.5

== Transactions ==
- February 14, 2007 re-signed Tully Bevilaqua.
- March 7, 2007 traded Olympia Scott to the Phoenix Mercury for Ann Strother.
- March 14, 2007 exercised the 2008 option on Tan White's contract.
- March 23, 2007 traded La'Tangela Atkinson to the Sacramento Monarchs for the 24th pick in the 2008 WNBA draft
- March 23, 2007 re-signed Anna DeForge and signed free agent Tammy Sutton-Brown.
- April 13, 2007 waived Linda Frohlich.
- April 13, 2007 traded the 40th pick in the 2008 WNBA draft for Jessica Dickson.
- May 7, 2007 waived Lyndsey Medders.
- May 9, 2007 waived Erin Lawless and Ashley Key.
- May 16, 2007 waived Jessica Dickson and Jennifer Humphrey.

Preceded by 2006	Indiana Fever seasons 2007	Succeeded by 2008
