= Tyesha =

Tyesha is a feminine given name. Notable people and fictional characters with the name include:

== Real people ==
- Tyesha Edwards (1990/1991 – 2002), murder victim
- Tyesha Mattis (born 1999), British artistic gymnast

== Fictional characters ==
- Tyesha Hillman, minor character in Marvel Comics

== See also ==
- Tye'sha Fluker (born 1984), American basketball player
