= Lyndra Littles =

American basketball player

Personal information
- Born: June 20, 1987 (age 39) Washington, D.C., U.S.
- Listed height: 6 ft 1 in (1.85 m)

Career information
- High school: Archbishop Carroll (Washington, D.C.)
- College: Virginia (2005–2009)
- WNBA draft: 2009: 2nd round, 17th overall pick
- Drafted by: Connecticut Sun
- Position: Forward

Career highlights
- LNBPF Foreign MVP (2022); First-team All-ACC (2009)
- Stats at Basketball Reference

Lyndra S. Littles (born June 20, 1987) is an American basketball player.

She was drafted by the Connecticut Sun but waived before the 2009 WNBA season began. She was signed to a training camp contract by the Indiana Fever in 2010, but did not play for the team.

In 2022, Littles was named the Foreign MVP in the inaugural season of the Mexican Liga Nacional de Baloncesto Profesional Femenil (LNBPF) while playing for the Libertadoras de Querétaro. She returned to the team for the 2023 season.

== Virginia statistics ==
Legend
GP	Games played	GS	Games started	MPG	Minutes per game
FG%	Field goal percentage	3P%	3-point field goal percentage	FT%	Free throw percentage
RPG	Rebounds per game	APG	Assists per game	SPG	Steals per game
BPG	Blocks per game	PPG	Points per game	**Bold**	Career high

Year	Team	GP	Points	FG%	3P%	FT%	RPG	APG	SPG	BPG	PPG
2005–06	Virginia	**32**	300	45.9	–	56.9	6.5	0.4	0.6	0.2	9.4
2006–07	Virginia	34	**589**	**48.9**	–	75.7	**8.8**	**1.0**	1.0	**0.5**	17.3
2007–08	Virginia	30	503	44.2	38.6	77.2	7.3	0.7	0.6	0.4	16.8
2008–09	Virginia	25	497	43.7	**43.3**	**81.1**	6.4	0.7	**1.4**	**0.5**	**19.9**
Career	Virginia	121	1889	45.7	40.6	74.0	7.3	0.7	0.9	0.4	15.6
