= K. B. Sharp =

American-French basketball player (born 1981)

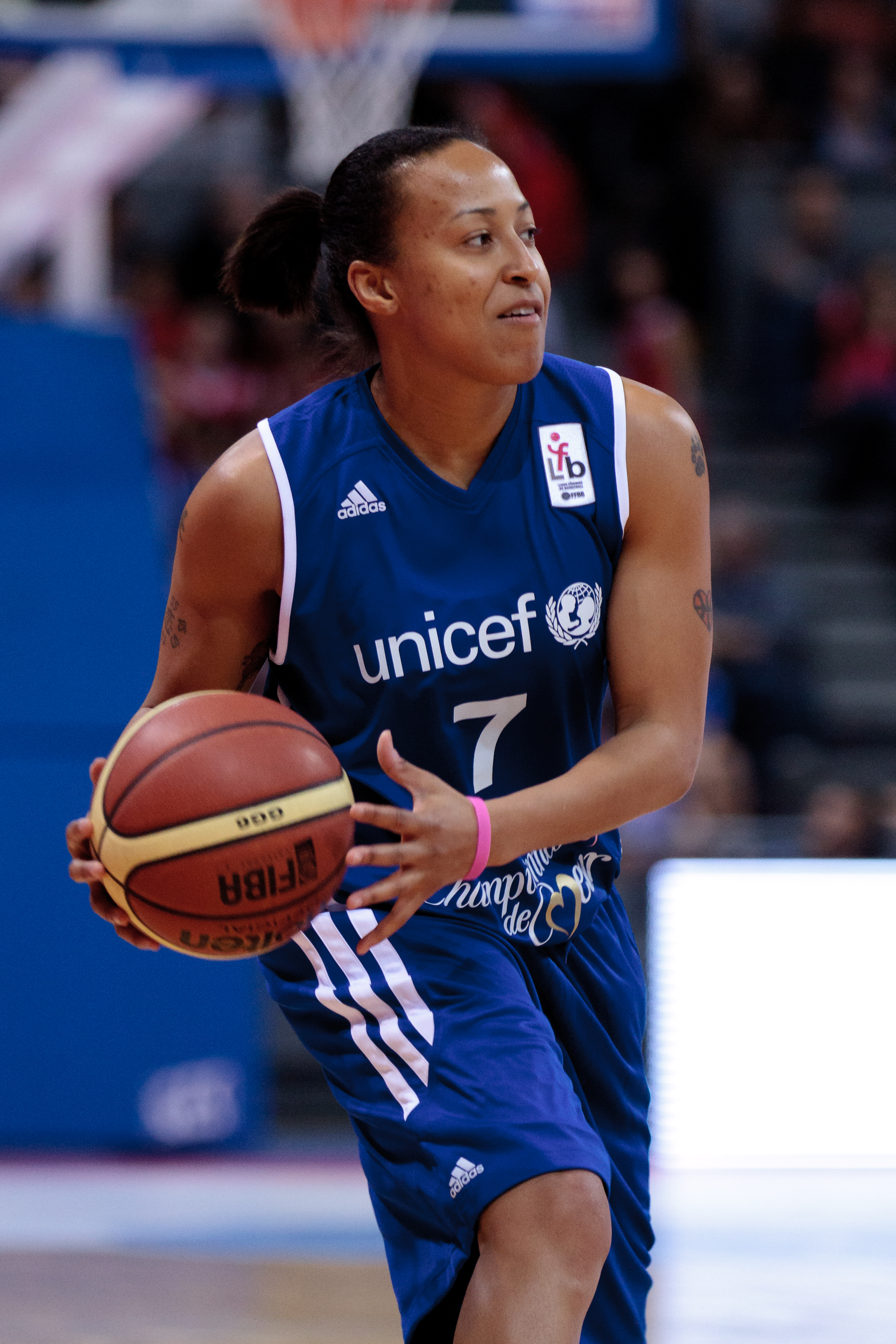

Personal information
- Born: April 18, 1981 (age 45) Columbus, Ohio, U.S.
- Listed height: 5 ft 9 in (1.75 m)
- Listed weight: 149 lb (68 kg)

Career information
- High school: Bexley (Bexley, Ohio)
- College: Cincinnati (1999–2003)
- WNBA draft: 2003: 2nd round, 26th overall pick
- Drafted by: New York Liberty
- Playing career: 2003–2009
- Position: Shooting guard

Career history
- 2003–2004: New York Liberty
- 2006–2007: Indiana Fever
- 2008–2009: Chicago Sky

Career highlights
- First-team All-CUSA (2003)
- Stats at WNBA.com
- Stats at Basketball Reference

Kristen Brooke "K. B." Sharp (born April 18, 1981) is a professional women's basketball player, playing in the WNBA and overseas.

== Early years ==
She was born in Columbus, Ohio., Sharp attended Bexley High School, in Bexley, Ohio, where she was named both an all-state (Ohio) in her senior year and an Honorable Mention All-American by the newspaper USA Today.

== University of Cincinnati ==
She attended the University of Cincinnati and majored in Criminal Justice.

From 2002 to 2003, she marked her best collegiate season, scoring a performance of 13.6 ppg, while also averaging 5.7 rpg and 5.9 apg. She made the All-Conference USA First Team and was team captain (2001–02) of the All-Conference USA Third Team. She earned the title of UC's Most Outstanding Player, the team's Ball of Courage and Insane Chain awards.

She had 205 assists, breaking her own school record of 170 set as a sophomore, as well as played 1,214 minutes, breaking her own school record of 1,207.

She earned a spot on the Bearcat Invitational All-Tournament team after averaging 11.5 ppg and 6.0 apg in the two games. From 2000 to 2001, she was named UC's most outstanding player, averaging 8.3 ppg, 3.6 rpg, team-best of 5.3 apg and 1.5 spg. She was called to the All-Conference USA tournament team after averaging 11.8 ppg and 6.8 apg during the four contests in the 1999–00 season. She finished fifth on the team in scoring, averaging 5.6 points a game.

== Cincinnati statistics ==
Sharp's statistics:

Legend
GP	Games played	GS	Games started	MPG	Minutes per game
FG%	Field goal percentage	3P%	3-point field goal percentage	FT%	Free throw percentage
RPG	Rebounds per game	APG	Assists per game	SPG	Steals per game
BPG	Blocks per game	PPG	Points per game	**Bold**	Career high

Year	Team	GP	Points	FG%	3P%	FT%	RPG	APG	SPG	BPG	PPG
1999-00	Cincinnati	31	174	**43.4**	30.1	64.5	1.9	2.1	1.0	0.1	5.6
2000–01	Cincinnati	**32**	266	41.6	29.7	63.9	3.6	5.3	1.5	0.2	8.3
2001–02	Cincinnati	**32**	301	40.9	**31.2**	80.5	4.4	**6.4**	1.5	**0.3**	9.4
2002–03	Cincinnati	31	**423**	41.2	24.1	**82.0**	**5.7**	5.9	1.2	0.2	**13.6**
Career	Cincinnati	126	1164	41.6	28.4	75.8	3.9	4.9	1.3	0.2	9.2

== WNBA career ==
Sharp was chosen in the second round (26th overall) in the 2003 WNBA draft by the New York Liberty.

She saw action in 30 games in her rookie campaign. She scored a career high, 14 points on 4-of-7 shooting on June 7 against the Indiana Fever and was selected to the WNBA Select team which competed internationally.

In 2004, Sharp played 30 games for the Liberty, but she played fewer overall minutes than she did in the previous season.

In May 2005, prior to the start of the following WNBA season, she was waived by the Liberty.

In February 2006, she signed a free agent contract with the Indiana Fever.

She then played for the Chicago Sky.

== WNBA Career statistics ==
=== Regular season ===
Year	Team	GP	GS	MPG	FG%	3P%	FT%	RPG	APG	SPG	BPG	TO	PPG
2003	New York	30	0	13.3	39.4	29.2	79.5	1.1	1.2	0.5	0.0	0.9	3.1
2004	New York	30	0	8.0	24.3	0.0	91.7	0.7	1.1	0.2	0.0	0.7	1.0
2006	Indiana	23	0	6.7	22.9	20.0	100.0	0.4	1.0	0.3	0.0	0.3	1.0
2007	Indiana	34	0	13.4	41.2	28.6	72.4	0.9	1.4	0.4	0.0	0.8	3.2
2008	Chicago	34	6	17.6	44.4	32.1	65.5	1.3	1.4	0.4	0.0	0.9	3.2
2009	Chicago	27	0	12.0	40.4	35.3	94.7	0.7	0.9	0.3	0.1	0.9	2.6
Career	6 years, 2 teams	178	6	12.2	38.2	26.6	78.6	0.9	1.2	0.3	0.0	0.7	2.4

=== Playoffs ===
Year	Team	GP	GS	MPG	FG%	3P%	FT%	RPG	APG	SPG	BPG	TO	PPG
2004	New York	5	0	4.0	40.0	100.0	50.0	0.0	0.2	0.2	1.0	0.0	1.0
2007	Indiana	6	0	7.7	10.0	0.0	83.3	0.8	0.5	0.2	0.0	0.3	1.2
Career	2 years, 2 teams	11	0	6.0	20.0	25.0	83.3	0.5	0.7	0.1	0.0	0.2	1.1

== Overseas career ==
- 2003–04 she played in St. Petersburg, Russia, where she helped lead the team to the EuroCup Championship.
- 2004–05 she played 10 games for Israel's Hapoel Tel Aviv, where she averaged 14.9 ppg (.603 field goals), 3.8 rpg and 3.5 apg
- 2005–06 she played for Raanana Herzeliya in the Israel's First Division
- 2006–09 she played for Aix-en-Provence in France.
