= Leah Rush =

American basketball player (born 1984)

Personal information
- Born: October 25, 1984 (age 42) Amarillo, Texas, U.S.
- Listed height: 6 ft 1 in (1.85 m)

Career information
- High school: Amarillo High School (Amarillo, Texas)
- College: Oklahoma (2003–2007)
- WNBA draft: 2007: 3rd round, 28th overall pick
- Drafted by: Phoenix Mercury
- Playing career: 2007–present
- Position: Forward

Career history
- 2007: Chicago Sky
- 2008–2009: Estudiantes Madrid

Career highlights
- All-Big 12 Honorable Mention (2007); 2x All-Big 12 Second Team (2005, 2006)
- Stats at Basketball Reference

Leah Rush (born October 25, 1984) is an American former professional basketball player who played one season in the WNBA for the Chicago Sky. She played college basketball at Oklahoma.

== College career ==
Rush signed to play for Oklahoma on November 15, 2002.

For the 2005–2006 season, Rush was tapped as a Preseason All-Big 12 performer. In the 2006 Big 12 Championship Game, Rush scored 12 points to help Oklahoma complete and undefeated Big 12 season and capture its 3rd title in 5 years. Rush earned herself a Big 12 Honorable Mention selection in her senior season.

Rush later studied Anthropology at Durham University, where she acted as player-coach of the women's basketball team.

== College statistics ==
Year	Team	GP	Points	FG%	3P%	FT%	RPG	APG	SPG	BPG	PPG
2003–04	Oklahoma	33	278	.454	.250	.822	4.4	0.8	0.6	0.5	8.4
2004–05	Oklahoma	30	465	.465	.333	.847	6.3	1.2	0.8	0.7	15.5
2005–06	Oklahoma	36	362	.431	.341	.730	5.3	1.5	0.8	0.4	10.1
2006–07	Oklahoma	33	322	.506	.434	.766	4.0	1.5	0.7	0.3	9.8
Career		132	1427	.463	.360	.795	5.0	1.3	0.7	0.5	10.8

== Professional career ==
Rush was selected in the 3rd Round, 28th Overall, in the 2007 WNBA draft by the Phoenix Mercury. She was waived from the Mercury prior to the start of the season and did not make the team.

=== Chicago Sky ===
During the 2008 WNBA season, Rush was signed by the Chicago Sky to multiple 7-Day Contracts, thus officially making a WNBA roster. Rush appeared in 2 games for the Sky.

== WNBA career statistics ==
Legend
GP	Games played	GS	Games started	MPG	Minutes per game	RPG	Rebounds per game
APG	Assists per game	SPG	Steals per game	BPG	Blocks per game	PPG	Points per game
TO	Turnovers per game	FG%	Field-goal percentage	3P%	3-point field-goal percentage	FT%	Free-throw percentage
**Bold**	Career best	°	League leader

=== Regular season ===
Year	Team	GP	GS	MPG	FG%	3P%	FT%	RPG	APG	SPG	BPG	TO	PPG
2008	Chicago	2	0	6.0	.000	.000	.750	0.0	0.0	0.0	0.0	1.0	1.5
Career	1 year, 1 team	2	0	6.0	.000	.000	.750	0.0	0.0	0.0	0.0	1.0	1.5
