= 2008 Chicago Sky season =

- Head coach: Steven Key
- Arena: UIC Pavilion

Results
- Record: 12–22 (.353)
- Place: 5th (Eastern)
- Playoff finish: Did not qualify

The 2008 WNBA season was the third season in the WNBA for the Chicago Sky. The Sky, were once again, were looking for a new coach after Bo Overton resigned following one season with the Sky. Assistant coach Steven Key was hired as the new head coach and general manager.

The Sky received the second over pick in the 2008 WNBA draft from the draft lottery system. They were able to use this pick on star center Sylvia Fowles out of LSU.

== Transactions ==
=== Atlanta Dream Expansion Draft ===
The following player was selected in the Atlanta Dream expansion draft from the Chicago Sky:

Player	Nationality	College	New Team
Carla Thomas	United States	Vanderbilt	Atlanta Dream

=== WNBA draft ===
Round	Pick	Player	Nationality	School/Team/Country
1	2	Sylvia Fowles	United States	LSU
2	19	Quianna Chaney	United States	LSU
3	33	Angela Tisdale	United States	Baylor

=== Trades and Roster Changes ===
Date	Transaction
January 14, 2008	Extended Qualifying Offers to Catherine Joens and Claire Coggins
January 15, 2008	Cored Chasity Melvin
February 22, 2008	Signed Jia Perkins
March 12, 2008	Head coach Bo Overton resigned
March 12, 2008	Hired Steven Key as Head coach and General Manager
April 2, 2008	Signed Carrie Moore to a Training Camp Contract
April 5, 2008	Stacey Dales announced her retirement from the WNBA
April 15, 2008	Signed Sylvia Fowles, Quianna Chaney, and Angela Tisdale to their Rookie Scale Contracts
April 16, 2008	Signed Nina Stone and Amanda Jackson to Training Camp Contracts
April 18, 2008	Signed Brooke Queenan to a Training Camp Contract
April 22, 2008	Signed Chasity Melvin
April 24, 2008	Signed Catherine Joens to a Training Camp Contract
April 28, 2008	Signed Claire Coggins to a Training Camp Contract
May 4, 2008	Waived Nina Stone, Claire Coggins, and Angela Tisdale
May 6, 2008	Signed Erin Grant to a Training Camp Contract
May 9, 2008	Waived Amanda Jackson and Carrie Moore
May 14, 2008	Traded Bernadette Ngoyisa to the Indiana Fever in exchange for K.B. Sharp
May 15, 2008	Waived Erin Grant and Stephanie Raymond
May 16, 2008	Temporarily Suspend Liz Moeggenberg
May 20, 2008	Waived Kayte Christensen
May 31, 2008	Exercised the 4th-Year Team Option on Candice Dupree
June 5, 2008	Signed Tye'sha Fluker
June 28, 2008	Waived Brooke Queenan
July 1, 2008	Signed Brooke Queenan to a 7-Day Contract
July 8, 2008	Signed Brooke Queenan to a 2nd 7-Day Contract
July 8, 2008	Signed Leah Rush to a 7-Day Contract
July 15, 2008	Signed Brooke Queenan to a 3rd 7-Day Contract
July 22, 2008	Signed Brooke Queenan to a 4th 7-Day Contract
August 14, 2008	Waived Brooke Queenan
August 14, 2008	Signed Leah Rush to a 2nd 7-Day Contract
September 4, 2008	Signed Leah Rush to a 3rd 7-Day Contract
September 11, 2008	Signed Leah Rush
September 11, 2008	Signed Brooke Wyckoff to a Contract Extension
September 14, 2008	Signed Dominique Canty to a One-Year Extension

== Roster ==
2008 Chicago Sky roster
Players
Coaches

Pos.	No.	Nat.	Name	Height	Weight	From
G/F	3	(United States)	Canty, Dominique	5' 9" (1.75m)	162 lb (73kg)	Alabama
SG	15	(United States)	Chaney, Quianna	5' 11" (1.8m)	160 lb (73kg)	LSU
PF	4	(United States)	Dupree, Candice	6' 2" (1.88m)	162 lb (73kg)	Temple
C	42	(United States)	Fluker, Tye'sha	6' 5" (1.96m)	209 lb (95kg)	Tennessee
C	34	(United States)	Fowles, Sylvia	6' 6" (1.98m)	200 lb (91kg)	LSU
G/F	9	(United States)	Joens, Catherine	5' 11" (1.8m)	165 lb (75kg)	George Washington
F/C	44	(United States)	Melvin, Chasity	6' 3" (1.91m)	185 lb (84kg)	NC State
SG	11	(United States)	Perkins, Jia	5' 8" (1.73m)	155 lb (70kg)	Texas Tech
G/F	22	(United States)	Price, Armintie	5' 9" (1.75m)	133 lb (60kg)	Mississippi
SF	24	(United States)	Rush, Leah	6' 1" (1.85m)	175 lb (79kg)	Oklahoma
PG	32	(United States)	Sharp, K.B.	5' 9" (1.75m)	146 lb (66kg)	Cincinnati
SF	21	(United States)	Wyckoff, Brooke	6' 1" (1.85m)	183 lb (83kg)	Florida State

Head coach
(United States) Steven Key (Boston University)
Assistant coaches
(United States) Stephanie White (Purdue)
(United States) Michael Mitchell (Fresno State)

Legend

- (C) Team captain
- (DP) Unsigned draft pick
- (FA) Free agent
- (S) Suspended
- Injured

WNBA roster page

=== Depth ===
Pos.	Starter	Bench
C	Chasity Melvin	Sylvia Fowles; Tye'sha Fluker
PF	Candice Dupree	Catherine Joens
SF	Brooke Wyckoff	Armintie Price; Leah Rush
SG	Jia Perkins	K.B. Sharp
PG	Dominique Canty	Quianna Chaney

== Schedule ==
=== Regular season ===
2008 Regular Season Schedule
Total: 12–22 (Home: 0–2; Road: 1–1)
May: 1–2 (Home: 8–9; Road: 4–13)

Game	Date	Opponent	Score	High points	High rebounds	High assists	Location/Attendance	Record
1	May 17	@ Seattle	61-67	Chasity Melvin (15)	Candice Dupree (10)	Perkins; Price (2)	KeyArena; 12,079	0-1
2	May 22	Sacramento	87-77	Dupree; Price (22)	Sylvia Fowles (7)	Dominique Canty (6)	UIC Pavilion; 4,188	1-1
3	May 29	Minnesota	69-75	Sylvia Fowles (16)	Sylvia Fowles (11)	Dominique Canty (6)	UIC Pavilion; 3,014	1-2

June: 3–7 (Home: 2–4; Road: 1–3)

Game	Date	Opponent	Score	High points	High rebounds	High assists	Location/Attendance	Record
4	June 1	Connecticut	73-75	Jia Perkins (21)	Sylvia Fowles (12)	Dominique Canty (5)	UIC Pavilion; 2,276	1-3
5	June 3	Los Angeles	77-81 (OT)	Candice Dupree (22)	Candice Dupree (11)	Dominique Canty (8)	UIC Pavilion; 6,304	1-4
6	June 6	@ Atlanta	86-72	Canty; Perkins (16)	Dupree; Perkins (9)	Price (5)	Philips Arena; 7,418	2-4
7	June 7	Atlanta	91-70	Candice Dupree (20)	Chasity Melvin (7)	Dominique Canty (6)	UIC Pavilion; 3,182	3-4
8	June 13	Washington	57-64	Jia Perkins (17)	Candice Dupree (8)	Canty; Price (4)	UIC Pavilion; 2,600	3-5
9	June 18	@ Los Angeles	67-80	Jia Perkins (18)	Candice Dupree (8)	Canty; Dupree (3)	STAPLES Center; 7,245	3-6
10	June 20	@ Phoenix	105-112 (OT)	Jia Perkins (30)	Candice Dupree (12)	Candice Dupree (5)	US Airways Center; 7,311	3-7
11	June 22	@ Sacramento	70-82	Jia Perkins (22)	Candice Dupree (11)	Dominique Canty (8)	ARCO Arena; 6,107	3-8
12	June 26	Phoenix	79-89	Chasity Melvin (19)	Chasity Melvin (15)	Brooke Wyckoff (9)	UIC Pavilion; 3,103	3-9
13	June 28	Detroit	76-59	Candice Dupree (18)	Dupree; Melvin (8)	Chasity Melvin (5)	UIC Pavilion; 3,407	4-9

July: 4–8 (Home: 3–1; Road: 1–7)

Game	Date	Opponent	Score	High points	High rebounds	High assists	Location/Attendance	Record
14	July 1	@ Minnesota	73-71	Candice Dupree (26)	Chasity Melvin (11)	Dominique Canty (5)	Target Center; 4,765	5-9
15	July 2	@ Indiana	67-74	Candice Dupree (20)	Candice Dupree (13)	Dupree; Wyckoff (4)	Conseco Fieldhouse; 6,196	5-10
16	July 5	@ Atlanta	84-91	Jia Perkins (24)	Candice Dupree (8)	Dominique Canty (6)	Philips Arena; 8,468	5-11
17	July 10	San Antonio	67-75	Jia Perkins (17)	Candice Dupree (8)	Canty; Perkins (4)	UIC Pavilion; 3,040	5-12
18	July 12	@ Indiana	57-66	Candice Dupree (19)	Chasity Melvin (12)	Chasity Melvin (5)	Conseco Fieldhouse; 7,134	5-13
19	July 13	Atlanta	79-66	Dupree; Perkins (18)	Armintie Price (7)	Dupree; Perkins; Wyckoff; Fluker (3)	UIC Pavilion; 2,907	6-13
20	July 16	@ Detroit	63-66	Jia Perkins (26)	Candice Dupree (12)	Dupree; Melvin (4)	Palace of Auburn Hills; 15,210	6-14
21	July 18	Connecticut	73-65	Jia Perkins (15)	Candice Dupree (9)	K.B. Sharp (4)	UIC Pavilion; 3,379	7-14
22	July 20	@ Connecticut	67-74	Armintie Price (15)	Chasity Melvin (10)	Jia Perkins (5)	Mohegan Sun Arena; 7,367	7-15
23	July 22	Indiana	68-60	Candice Dupree (20)	Jia Perkins (10)	Jia Perkins (8)	UIC Pavilion; 3,035	8-15
24	July 24	@ San Antonio	67-78	Candice Dupree (20)	Candice Dupree (10)	Perkins; Sharp (3)	AT&T Center; 9,372	8-16
25	July 26	@ Houston	65-79	Candice Dupree (28)	Jia Perkins (7)	Jia Perkins (5)	Reliant Arena; 6,569	8-17

August: 3–0 (Home: 1–0; Road: 2–0)

Game	Date	Opponent	Score	High points	High rebounds	High assists	Location/Attendance	Record
Summer Olympic break
26	August 28	@ New York	69-60	Jia Perkins (19)	Sylvia Fowles (10)	Armintie Price (5)	Madison Square Garden; 8,566	9-17
27	August 29	@ Washington	79-75	Jia Perkins (28)	Sylvia Fowles (13)	Armintie Price (4)	Verizon Center; 10,043	10-17
28	August 31	Detroit	82-81 (OT)	Candice Dupree (24)	Sylvia Fowles (12)	Candice Dupree (7)	UIC Pavilion; 4,197	11-17

September: 1–5 (Home: 1–3; Road: 0–2)

Game	Date	Opponent	Score	High points	High rebounds	High assists	Location/Attendance	Record
29	September 4	Seattle	62-70	Jia Perkins (22)	Candice Dupree (6)	Dominique Canty (6)	UIC Pavilion; 3,829	11-18
30	September 5	@ Connecticut	75-80	Jia Perkins (18)	Sylvia Fowles (6)	Dominique Canty (7)	Mohegan Sun Arena; 8,088	11-19
31	September 7	@ New York	61-69	Jia Perkins (18)	Sylvia Fowles (12)	Canty; Sharp (2)	Madison Square Garden; 7,903	11-20
32	September 9	Washington	78-59	Jia Perkins (17)	Candice Dupree (10)	Candice Dupree (6)	UIC Pavilion; 3,087	12-20
33	September 12	New York	62-69	Candice Dupree (18)	Dupree; Fowles (6)	Canty; Wyckoff (4)	UIC Pavilion; 5,681	12-21
34	September 14	Houston	76-79	Candice Dupree (20)	Armintie Price (7)	Dominique Canty (6)	UIC Pavilion; 4,917	12-22

== Standings ==
Eastern Conference	W	L	PCT	GB	Home	Road	Conf.
Detroit Shock ^{x}	22	12	.647	–	14–3	8–9	16–4
Connecticut Sun ^{x}	21	13	.618	1.0	13–4	8–9	13–7
New York Liberty ^{x}	19	15	.559	3.0	11–6	8–9	11–9
Indiana Fever ^{x}	17	17	.500	5.0	11–6	6–11	12–8
Chicago Sky ^{o}	12	22	.353	10.0	8–9	4–13	10–10
Washington Mystics ^{o}	10	24	.294	12.0	6–11	4–13	6–14
Atlanta Dream ^{o}	4	30	.118	18.0	1–16	3–14	2–18

== Statistics ==
Legend
GP	Games played	GS	Games started	MPG	Minutes per game	RPG	Rebounds per game
APG	Assists per game	SPG	Steals per game	BPG	Blocks per game	PPG	Points per game
FG%	Field-goal percentage	3P%	3-point field-goal percentage	FT%	Free-throw percentage	TO	Turnovers per game
PF	Fouls per game		Team leader		League leader

=== Regular season ===
Player	GP	GS	MPG	FG%	3P%	FT%	RPG	APG	SPG	BPG	PPG
Jia Perkins	34	34	31.9	43.6	36.3	89.1	4.0	2.8	1.9	0.3	17.0
Candice Dupree	34	34	32.9	45.7	14.3	78.0	7.9	2.3	1.1	1.3	16.3
Sylvia Fowles	17	14	25.3	51.3	0.0	58.5	7.5	0.3	1.1	2.1	10.5
Chasity Melvin	34	18	22.3	44.3	33.3	61.4	5.1	1.5	0.9	0.3	8.2
Dominique Canty	28	28	26.3	39.4	16.7	66.9	2.5	4.1	1.0	0.1	8.1
Armintie Price	34	11	22.4	43.8	0.0	52.0	3.7	1.7	1.0	0.4	6.9
Catherine Joens	26	0	10.5	37.4	36.9	87.5	1.3	0.5	0.2	0.1	3.8
K.B. Sharp	34	6	17.6	43.3	32.1	65.5	1.3	1.4	0.4	0.0	3.1
Tye'sha Fluker	26	2	8.9	38.5	33.3	76.0	1.3	0.4	0.2	0.3	2.7
Quianna Chaney	28	0	8.6	27.7	24.0	83.3	1.0	0.9	0.6	0.1	2.4
Brooke Wyckoff	34	23	17.5	34.2	31.4	56.3	2.3	1.4	0.4	0.6	2.2
Leah Rush	2	0	6.0	0.0	0.0	75.0	0.0	0.0	0.0	0.0	1.5
Brooke Queenan	8	0	4.5	12.5	0.0	0.0	0.5	0.3	0.0	0.0	0.3

== Awards and honors ==
Recipient	Award	Date awarded	Ref.
Sylvia Fowles	WNBA All-Defense Second Team	September 19	
Sylvia Fowles	WNBA All-Rookie Team	October 3	
Jia Perkins	Eastern Conference Player of the Week	September 2	
