= Anna DeForge =

American-Montenegrin basketball player (born 1976)

Personal information
- Born: April 14, 1976 (age 50) Iron Mountain, Michigan, U.S.
- Listed height: 5 ft 10 in (1.78 m)
- Listed weight: 160 lb (73 kg)

Career information
- High school: Niagara (Niagara, Wisconsin)
- College: Nebraska (1994–1998)
- WNBA draft: 1998: undrafted
- Playing career: 1998–2015
- Position: Guard
- Number: 30

Career history
- 1998: San Jose Lasers
- 2000: Detroit Shock
- 2002: Kansas City Legacy
- 2003: Chicago Blaze
- 2003–2005: Phoenix Mercury
- 2005–2008: TS Wisła Can-Pack Kraków
- 2006–2007: Indiana Fever
- 2008: Minnesota Lynx
- 2009: Detroit Shock
- 2009–2010: Beşiktaş JK
- 2010–2011: Hondarribia-Irún
- 2011–2012: TED Kayseri
- 2012–2013: USK Praha
- 2014: Konak
- 2015: TTT Riga

Career highlights
- 2× WNBA All-Star (2004, 2007); 2× First-team All-Big 12 (1997, 1998); Wisconsin Miss Basketball (1994)
- Stats at WNBA.com
- Stats at Basketball Reference

Anna Louise DeForge (born April 14, 1976) is an American-Montenegrin professional female basketball player who most recently played for the Detroit Shock in the WNBA. She was the first player from the University of Nebraska–Lincoln to play in the WNBA. After finding little success and playing time for several WNBA teams, she finally earned a spot on a WNBA All-Star team in 2004. She was one of the players selected to play in the historic WNBA vs. USA Basketball Game.

On February 3, 2006, she was traded to the Indiana Fever from the Phoenix Mercury in exchange for Kelly Miller.

On February 19, 2008, DeForge signed on with the Minnesota Lynx.

On February 27, 2009, DeForge signed on with the Beşiktaş Istanbul.

== WNBA career statistics ==
Legend
GP	Games played	GS	Games started	MPG	Minutes per game	RPG	Rebounds per game
APG	Assists per game	SPG	Steals per game	BPG	Blocks per game	PPG	Points per game
TO	Turnovers per game	FG%	Field-goal percentage	3P%	3-point field-goal percentage	FT%	Free-throw percentage
**Bold**	Career best	°	League leader

=== Regular season ===
Year	Team	GP	GS	MPG	FG%	3P%	FT%	RPG	APG	SPG	BPG	TO	PPG
2000	Detroit	27	10	16.0	.405	.321	.781	1.7	1.7	1.0	0.1	1.2	5.4
2003	Phoenix	**34**	27	31.3	.412	**.412**	.725	3.1	2.1	**1.5**	**0.4**	1.6	11.9
2004	Phoenix	**34**	**34**	33.9	.417	.387	.863	3.6	**3.1**	**1.5**	0.2	2.0	**14.4**
2005	Phoenix	33	33	**34.3**	.390	.326	.850	3.5	2.4	1.2	0.2	2.5	13.1
2006	Indiana	**34**	**34**	29.3	.393	.378	.818	**4.3**	2.2	1.1	0.3	1.6	10.2
2007	Indiana	**34**	**34**	23.4	**.418**	.410	**.906**	3.3	1.5	0.8	0.1	1.4	8.7
2008	Minnesota	**34**	**34**	24.9	.391	.364	.763	3.0	1.7	0.8	0.1	0.9	8.5
2009	Detroit	7	7	16.1	.278	.000	.000	2.9	1.4	0.6	0.0	1.0	1.4
Career	8 years, 4 teams	237	213	27.6	.403	.374	.821	3.2	2.1	1.1	0.2	1.6	10.2

=== Playoffs ===
Year	Team	GP	GS	MPG	FG%	3P%	FT%	RPG	APG	SPG	BPG	TO	PPG
2006	Indiana	2	2	32.0	.333	.250	.000	3.5	**1.5**	0.5	0.0	0.0	6.0
2007	Indiana	**6**	**6**	**32.8**	**.467**	**.393**	**1.000**	**3.7**	1.0	**1.3**	**0.2**	1.5	**16.8**
Career	2 years, 1 team	8	8	32.6	.444	.361	1.000	3.6	1.1	1.1	0.1	1.1	14.1

== Nebraska statistics ==
Legend
GP	Games played	GS	Games started	MPG	Minutes per game
FG%	Field goal percentage	3P%	3-point field goal percentage	FT%	Free throw percentage
RPG	Rebounds per game	APG	Assists per game	SPG	Steals per game
BPG	Blocks per game	PPG	Points per game	**Bold**	Career high

Year	Team	GP	Points	FG%	3P%	FT%	RPG	PPG
1994-95	Nebraska	27	339	41.2%	33.3%	67.3%	6.9	12.6
1995-96	Nebraska	29	420	43.0%	30.9%	**82.0%**	6.8	14.5
1996-97	Nebraska	28	489	**46.0%**	**38.5%**	78.1%	5.8	17.5
1997-98	Nebraska	**33**	**611**	40.9%	32.5%	77.5%	**7.9**	**18.5**
Career		117	1859	42.7%	33.4%	77.3%	6.9	15.9

== Personal ==
Born to Rosemary and Roger DeForge in Iron Mountain, Michigan, she played at Niagara High School in Niagara, Wisconsin. DeForge majored in Business Administration at the University of Nebraska–Lincoln.

== Career highlights ==
- Selected to start the 2007 WNBA All-Star for the Eastern Conference by the WNBA Fans
- Selected to play in the WNBA vs. USA Basketball Game at Radio City Music Hall in 2004
- Won the National Women's Basketball League Championship with the Dallas Fury in 2004
- 2005-2006: (Poland) Honored as league (PLKK) MVP . The Polish TS Wisla Can-Pack Krakow team won the Women's PLKK Championship Series.
- 2006-2007: (Poland) Her Polish TS Wisła Can-Pack Kraków team won the Women's PLKK Championship Series.
- 2007-2008: (Poland) Her Polish TS Wisła Can-Pack Kraków team won the Women's PLKK Championship Series.
- 2022 Spring Season: Won the Brewtown Recreation Co-Ed Flag Football League Championship with Beer Bellys.
- 2024 Spring Season: Won the Brewtown Recreation Co-Ed Flag Football League Championship with Beer Bellys.
