= Morgan Warburton =

American professional basketball player (born 1987)

Personal information
- Born: April 27, 1987 (age 39) Price, Utah, U.S.
- Listed height: 5 ft 10 in (1.78 m)
- Listed weight: 149 lb (68 kg)

Career information
- High school: Carbon (Price, Utah)
- College: Utah (2005–2009)
- WNBA draft: 2009: 3rd round, 33rd overall pick
- Drafted by: Sacramento Monarchs
- Position: Guard

Career highlights
- MWC Player of the Year (2009); MWC Tournament MVP (2009); 3× First-team All-MWC (2007–2009)
- Stats at Basketball Reference

Morgan Warburton (born April 27, 1987) is an American professional basketball player. She was drafted by the Sacramento Monarchs in the 2009 WNBA draft. She was waived on June 4, 2009.

== Playing career ==
=== High school ===
At Carbon High School, she earned all-state and all-region honors in basketball, volleyball and softball. She led her school to the state basketball championship in 2005 and paced the team in scoring for three seasons. Honors included being named Class 3A MVP in 2005.

=== Utah Utes ===
As a Sophomore, she started all 33 games and averaged 33 minutes per game, while playing in double-digit minutes each outing. Warburton averaged a team-best 15.8 points and led the team (ninth nationally) with an .882 free throw percentage. Against UNLV, Warburton had a double-double (19 points, 10 rebounds).

Heading into her junior year, Warburton was a starter in all 32 games, averaging over 33 minutes per game. She led the team, second in the MWC with 17.2 points per game and tallied double-digit scoring numbers in all 32 games, the longest streak in the conference. She was named honorable mention All-America by the Associated Press. On January 16, she became Utah's 20th 1,000-point scorer in a game against San Diego State on January 16.

In her senior year, Warburton was the preseason Mountain West Conference Player of the Year and a returning All-American. Entering the 2008–09 season, she was Utah's 20th 1,000-point scorer and a two-time all-conference player.

=== Sacramento Monarchs ===
She was selected in the 3rd round, 33rd overall in the 2009 WNBA draft. Her WNBA exhibition debut was on May 21 in a 64–55 loss to the Seattle Storm. She played 11 minutes, had 2 field goals, 1 three-pointer, 2 rebounds, 1 block and 6 points.

=== European League ===
She played in Spain for Gran Canaria during the 2009–2010 season and Girona for the 2010–2011 season.

== Career stats ==
Year	Games	Minutes	Field Goals	Three Pointers	Rebounds	Assists	Blocks	Steals	Points
2005–06	34	614	67	25	78	31	7	12	203
2006–07	33	1079	168	51	159	103	8	40	522
2007–08	32	1063	192	67	173	69	10	51	550
2008–09	33	1178	195	60	203	113	11	40	611

== Awards and honors ==
- First-team All-Mountain West Conference, 2006–07
- First-team All-Mountain West Conference, 2007–08
- Led Mountain West Conference in free throw percentage (.861), 2007–08

== Coaching career ==
In June 2011, Morgan joined the coaching staff at the University of Utah as Video Coordinator for the women's basketball team. In 2015, she became an assistant coach for the women's basketball team of Utah State University Eastern.

== Personal ==
In May 2012, Morgan married Tyler Nelson and began using the surname Warburton-Nelson professionally.
