= Brooke Queenan =

American basketball player (born 1984)

Personal information
- Born: April 10, 1984 (age 42) Abington Pennsylvania, U.S.
- Listed height: 6 ft 2 in (1.88 m)
- Listed weight: 185 kg (408 lb)

Career information
- High school: West Chester (West Chester, Pennsylvania)
- College: Boston College (2002–2006)
- WNBA draft: 2006: 2nd round, 23rd overall pick
- Drafted by: New York Liberty
- Playing career: 2006–2014
- Position: Power forward
- Number: 2

Career history
- 2006: Connecticut Sun
- 2006–2007: Holargos Athens BC
- 2007–2008: Panionios WBC
- 2008: Chicago Sky
- 2008–2009: MiZo Pécs
- 2010: Aris WBC
- 2010–2011: BC Minsk 2006
- 2012–2013: Partizan
- 2014: Bnot Hertzeliya
- Stats at Basketball Reference

Brooke Queenan (born April 10, 1984) is an American retired professional basketball player. She played the power forward position, last for WBC Bnot Hertzeliya in Israel. With ŽKK Partizan she won national Championship (2012–13), national Cup (2012–13) and Adriatic League Women (2012–13).

== Career statistics ==
Legend
GP	Games played	GS	Games started	MPG	Minutes per game	RPG	Rebounds per game
APG	Assists per game	SPG	Steals per game	BPG	Blocks per game	PPG	Points per game
TO	Turnovers per game	FG%	Field-goal percentage	3P%	3-point field-goal percentage	FT%	Free-throw percentage
**Bold**	Career best	°	League leader

=== WNBA ===
==== Regular season ====
Year	Team	GP	GS	MPG	FG%	3P%	FT%	RPG	APG	SPG	BPG	TO	PPG
2006	Connecticut	4	0	2.5	0.0	0.0	100.0	0.0	0.0	0.0	0.0	0.3	0.5
2007	Did not play (waived)												
2008	Chicago	8	0	4.5	12.5	0.0	0.0	0.5	0.3	0.0	0.0	0.6	0.3
Career	2 years, 2 teams	12	0	3.8	11.1	0.0	100.0	0.3	0.2	0.0	0.0	0.5	0.3

=== College ===
Legend
GP	Games played	GS	Games started	MPG	Minutes per game
FG%	Field goal percentage	3P%	3-point field goal percentage	FT%	Free throw percentage
RPG	Rebounds per game	APG	Assists per game	SPG	Steals per game
BPG	Blocks per game	PPG	Points per game	**Bold**	Career high

Year	Team	GP	Points	FG%	3P%	FT%	RPG	APG	SPG	BPG	PPG
2002–03	Boston College	14	20	30.4	–	75.0	1.5	0.4	0.4	0.3	1.4
2003–04	Boston College	**34**	139	47.2	20.0	75.0	3.2	1.1	0.6	0.6	4.1
2004–05	Boston College	30	331	**50.4**	**48.3**	79.0	5.5	1.6	**0.8**	0.7	11.0
2005–06	Boston College	33	**497**	49.9	28.4	**80.8**	**8.1**	1.6	0.7	0.7	**15.1**
Career	Boston College	111	987	49.0	32.5	79.2	5.0	1.3	0.7	0.6	8.9
