= Shavonte Zellous =

American-Croatian basketball player (born 1986)

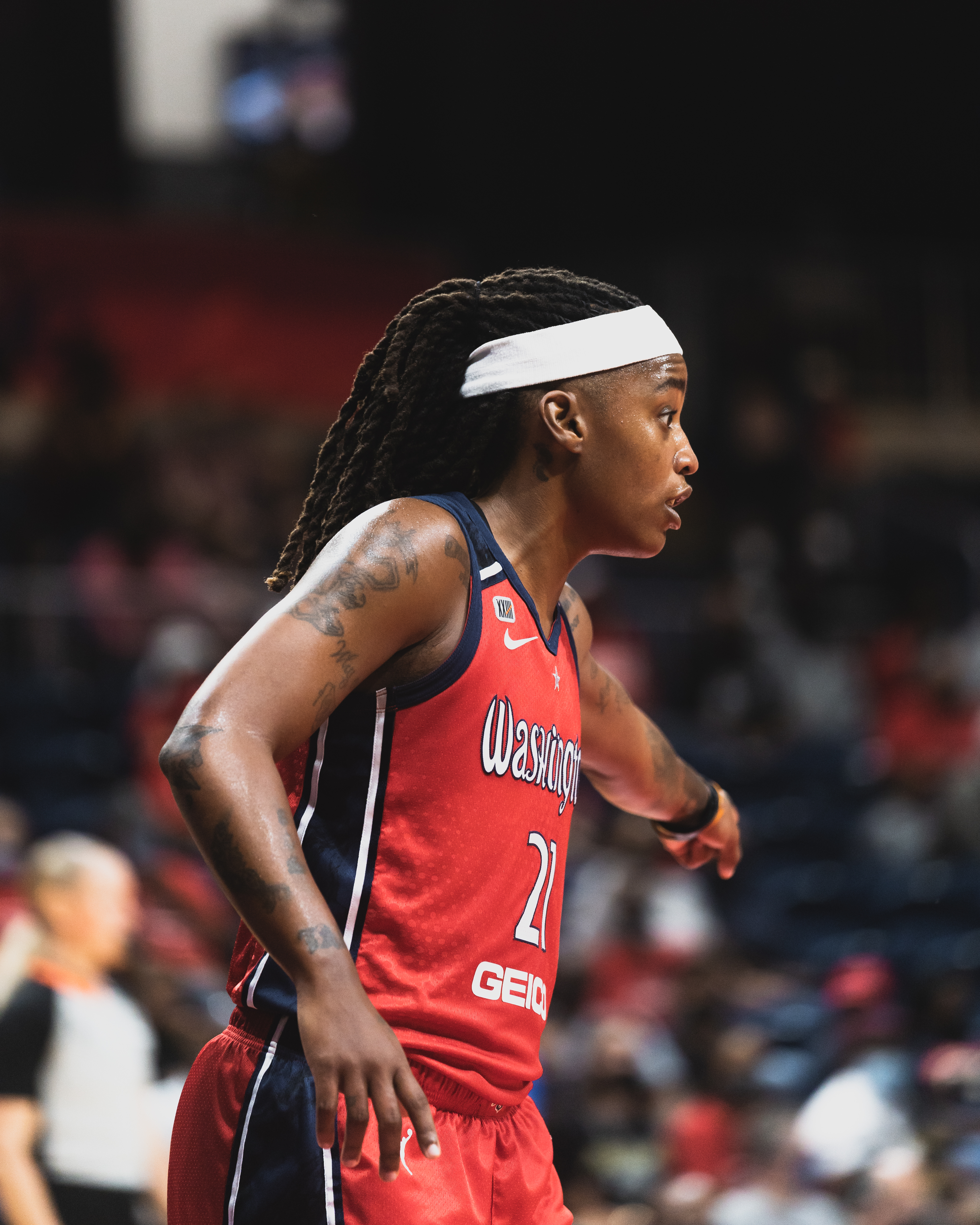

No. 11 – Perfumerías Avenida
- Position: Shooting guard
- League: Liga Femenina de Baloncesto

Personal information
- Born: August 28, 1986 (age 40)
- Listed height: 5 ft 10 in (1.78 m)
- Listed weight: 188 lb (85 kg)

Career information
- High school: Jones (Orlando, Florida)
- College: Pittsburgh (2005–2009)
- WNBA draft: 2009: 1st round, 11th overall pick
- Drafted by: Detroit Shock
- Playing career: 2009–present

Career history
- 2009: Detroit Shock
- 2009–2010: Beşiktaş
- 2010: Tulsa Shock
- 2010–2015: Indiana Fever
- 2010–2011: TTT Riga
- 2011: Ramat HaSharon
- 2011–2013: Mersin BB
- 2013–2014: Galatasaray
- 2014–2015: Fenerbahçe
- 2016–2018: New York Liberty
- 2016–2018: Beşiktaş
- 2018–2019: Bnot Herzliya
- 2019: Seattle Storm
- 2020–2021: Çankaya University
- 2021: Washington Mystics
- 2021: Çukurova Basketbol
- 2022: ES Cap Bon
- 2022–2023: Çankaya University
- 2023–2025: ESB Villeneuve-d'Ascq
- 2025–present: Perfumerías Avenida

Career highlights
- WNBA champion (2012); WNBA All-Star (2013); WNBA Most Improved Player (2013); WNBA All-Rookie Team (2009); Latvian National League champion (2011); Turkish National League champion (2014); French National League champion (2024); EuroLeague Women champion (2014); 2× Turkish Cup winner (2014, 2015); Turkish President Cup winner (2015); Third-team All-American – AP (2009); 3× First-team All-Big East (2007–2009); Big East Most Improved Player (2007)
- Stats at WNBA.com
- Stats at Basketball Reference

Shavonte Sade Zellous (born August 28, 1986) is an American-Croatian professional basketball player who plays for Perfumerías Avenida of the Liga Femenina de Baloncesto. She was a standout basketball player at the University of Pittsburgh. Zellous was drafted 11th in the first round of the 2009 WNBA draft by the Detroit Shock.

== Professional career ==
As a rookie in 2009, Zellous ranked second among rookies in points (11.9), was second overall in the league in free throws made (155) and averaged 1.8 assists per game. Zellous scored in double digits in 21 of the 34 games played during her first season and earned honors by making the WNBA All-Rookie Team, the lowest draft selection to ever make the All-Rookie team up until that point. Zellous was a member of the Indiana Fever team that won the WNBA championship in 2012 and was named a WNBA All-Star in 2013.

In February 2013, Zellous signed a multi-year contract with the Fever. In the 2013 season, Zellous almost doubled her scoring average, from 7.5 ppg in 2012 to 14.7 ppg in 2013. This improvement, coupled with increases in rebounding and shooting percentage helped her to win the WNBA Most-Improved player award in 2013.

On February 1, 2016, Zellous signed with the New York Liberty. Her WNBA averages include 39.5% in Field Goals, 80.3% in free throws, and 9.2 PPG.

On April 11, 2019, Zellous signed with the Seattle Storm.

On March 31, 2021, Zellous signed with the Washington Mystics, appearing in 28 games during the season.

== College career ==
While in college, Zellous was a standout guard for the University of Pittsburgh women's basketball team from 2005 to 2009. While there, she helped lead her team to a WNIT "Final Four" in 2006 and three straight NCAA tournament appearances from 2007 to 2009, during which her team advanced to the "Sweet Sixteen" in 2008 and 2009. While at Pitt, she earned Third Team AP All-American honors in 2009 and was the Big East Conference Most Improved Player in 2007. Zellous finished her career at Pitt ranked third on the university's all-time scoring list with 2,253 points. Zellous also became the first player in Pitt history (men's or women's) and the ninth in Big East history (men's or women's) to score 600 points in three separate seasons.

== International career ==
In 2015 prior to the 2016 Summer Olympics, Zellous announced she would be playing for the Croatia women's national basketball team.

== Career statistics ==
=== WNBA ===
Legend
GP	Games played	GS	Games started	MPG	Minutes per game	RPG	Rebounds per game
APG	Assists per game	SPG	Steals per game	BPG	Blocks per game	PPG	Points per game
TO	Turnovers per game	FG%	Field-goal percentage	3P%	3-point field-goal percentage	FT%	Free-throw percentage
**Bold**	Career best	°	League leader

==== Regular season ====
Year	Team	GP	GS	MPG	FG%	3P%	FT%	RPG	APG	SPG	BPG	TO	PPG
2009	Detroit	**34**	4	23.6	39.7	30.6	**85.6**	3.1	1.8	0.8	0.5	2.3	11.9
2010	Tulsa	4	1	16.8	16.1	10.0	83.3	0.8	2.5	0.5	0.0	**0.5**	4.0
2010	Indiana	27	0	15.5	36.2	28.0	74.7	2.1	1.3	0.4	0.6	1.2	5.9
2011	Indiana	33	2	14.0	**43.8**	26.5	78.4	2.4	1.4	0.4	0.5	1.0	5.5
2012	Indiana	31	31	22.3	36.9	34.5	77.0	2.7	1.7	0.7	0.5	1.4	7.5
2013	Indiana	29	29	**31.3**	41.5	**34.8**	78.0	3.4	1.7	0.9	**0.7**	1.9	**14.7**
2014	Indiana	**34**	33	27.4	41.1	30.5	78.4	2.8	2.1	0.7	0.5	1.6	11.0
2015	Indiana	23	1	22.2	37.9	24.1	77.1	2.3	1.9	**1.0**	0.3	1.2	8.4
2016	New York	33	1	23.3	40.3	19.2	85.1	2.5	2.2	0.9	0.2	1.3	8.8
2017	New York	**34**	**34**	29.1	42.3	33.3	82.3	**4.0**	2.8	0.9	0.2	1.9	11.7
2018	New York	22	22	24.1	42.3	26.7	75.4	3.1	**3.0**	0.6	0.2	1.2	8.2
2019	Seattle	31	4	13.9	37.9	18.8	75.0	1.5	1.5	0.3	0.2	1.1	4.0
2020	Did not play (did not appear in WNBA)												
2021	Washington	28	5	15.8	37.7	24.4	80.6	2.4	1.6	0.4	0.2	0.8	4.3
Career	12 years, 6 teams	363	167	21.9	39.8	29.1	80.1	2.7	1.9	0.7	0.4	1.4	8.5

==== Playoffs ====
Year	Team	GP	GS	MPG	FG%	3P%	FT%	RPG	APG	SPG	BPG	TO	PPG
2009	Detroit	5	0	29.0	35.3	41.2	85.2	5.0	**2.8**	**1.2**	0.6	1.4	**15.6**
2010	Indiana	3	0	10.3	**60.0**	0.0	85.7	0.7	0.7	0.0	0.3	0.7	4.0
2011	Indiana	**5**	1	19.2	42.9	40.0	60.0	2.6	1.4	0.4	0.6	1.2	8.6
2012	Indiana	10	**5**	27.9	39.8	26.7	85.7	2.9	1.7	0.9	**0.8**	1.7	10.6
2013	Indiana	4	4	26.5	44.7	**41.7**	92.3	3.8	2.0	0.3	0.5	**0.0**	12.8
2014	Indiana	5	**5**	**35.6**	38.9	29.2	75.0	3.4	1.0	0.4	**0.8**	0.6	14.4
2015	Indiana	11	0	21.5	43.8	30.8	80.0	2.4	1.9	0.7	0.5	1.3	7.6
2016	New York	1	0	28.0	44.4	0.0	50.0	3.0	1.0	1.0	0.0	**0.0**	10.0
2017	New York	1	1	26.0	14.3	0.0	**100.0**	**6.0**	1.0	1.0	0.0	2.0	4.0
2019	Seattle	2	0	7.0	33.3	0.0	0.0	0.5	0.5	0.5	0.5	1.0	2.0
Career	10 years, 4 teams	47	16	24.3	40.1	32.1	80.5	2.9	1.6	0.7	0.6	1.1	9.9

=== College ===
Legend
GP	Games played	GS	Games started	MPG	Minutes per game
FG%	Field goal percentage	3P%	3-point field goal percentage	FT%	Free throw percentage
RPG	Rebounds per game	APG	Assists per game	SPG	Steals per game
BPG	Blocks per game	PPG	Points per game	**Bold**	Career high

Year	Team	GP	Points	FG%	3P%	FT%	RPG	APG	SPG	BPG	PPG
2004–05	Pittsburgh	Redshirt									
2005–06	Pittsburgh	33	254	39.6	18.2	68.7	5.7	2.5	0.8	0.8	7.7
2006–07	Pittsburgh	33	631	42.7	31.4	77.4	**5.9**	2.8	1.0	0.6	19.1
2007–08	Pittsburgh	**34**	619	**43.4**	**38.9**	71.4	5.4	1.9	0.9	**0.9**	18.2
2008–09	Pittsburgh	33	**747**	41.5	36.6	**78.3**	5.7	**2.9**	**1.1**	0.6	**22.6**
Career totals	Pittsburgh	133	2251	42.1	34.6	75.0	5.7	2.5	0.9	0.7	16.9
