= Tanae Davis-Cain =

American basketball player (born 1987)

Personal information
- Born: June 7, 1987 (age 39) Philadelphia, Pennsylvania
- Listed height: 5 ft 11 in (1.80 m)

Career information
- High school: Terrell County (Dawson, Georgia)
- College: Florida State (2005–2009)
- WNBA draft: 2009: 3rd round, 37th overall pick
- Drafted by: Detroit Shock
- Position: Guard

Career history
- 2009: Detroit Shock
- 2016: Southern Lady Generals
- Stats at WNBA.com
- Stats at Basketball Reference

Tanae Davis-Cain (born June 7, 1987) is an American professional basketball player. She played high school basketball for Terrell County in Dawson, Georgia, where she averaged 16.2 points during her senior season and was named the All-Area player of the year by the Albany Herald. Following her graduation, she played college basketball for Florida State from 2005 to 2009. She was the schools 22nd player to score at least 1,000 points during her career and left the school as its all-time leader in three point shots made. Davis-Cain was drafted by the Detroit Shock in the third round of the 2009 WNBA draft and later appeared in one game for the team during the 2009 season.

== Career statistics ==
Legend
GP	Games played	GS	Games started	MPG	Minutes per game	RPG	Rebounds per game
APG	Assists per game	SPG	Steals per game	BPG	Blocks per game	PPG	Points per game
TO	Turnovers per game	FG%	Field-goal percentage	3P%	3-point field-goal percentage	FT%	Free-throw percentage
**Bold**	Career best	°	League leader

=== WNBA ===
==== Regular season ====
Year	Team	GP	GS	MPG	FG%	3P%	FT%	RPG	APG	SPG	BPG	TO	PPG
2009	Detroit	1	0	4.0	20.0	0.0	0.0	2.0	0.0	0.0	0.0	0.0	2.0
Career	1 year, 1 team	1	0	4.0	20.0	0.0	0.0	2.0	0.0	0.0	0.0	0.0	2.0

=== College ===
Legend
GP	Games played	GS	Games started	MPG	Minutes per game
FG%	Field goal percentage	3P%	3-point field goal percentage	FT%	Free throw percentage
RPG	Rebounds per game	APG	Assists per game	SPG	Steals per game
BPG	Blocks per game	PPG	Points per game	**Bold**	Career high

Year	Team	GP	Points	FG%	3P%	FT%	RPG	APG	SPG	BPG	PPG
2005–06	Florida State	30	164	39.9%	28.6%	69.2%	2.2	0.8	0.6	0.1	5.5
2006–07	Florida State	33	304	35.3%	28.7%	69.6%	3.2	1.0	0.9	0.2	9.2
2007–08	Florida State	24	361	**40.2%**	34.0%	**71.2%**	**4.6**	1.1	**1.5**	0.3	**15.0**
2008–09	Florida State	**34**	**433**	37.5%	**37.0%**	67.8%	3.3	**1.3**	1.3	**0.4**	12.7
Career		121	1262	38.0%	32.8%	69.5%	3.3	1.1	1.1	0.3	10.4
