= Whitney Boddie =

American basketball player (born 1987)

Personal information
- Born: January 23, 1987 (age 39) Florence, Alabama, U.S.
- Listed height: 5 ft 8 in (1.73 m)
- Listed weight: 145 lb (66 kg)

Career information
- High school: Florence (Florence, Alabama)
- College: Auburn (2005–2009)
- WNBA draft: 2009: 2nd round, 20th overall pick
- Drafted by: Sacramento Monarchs
- Position: Guard
- Number: 44

Career history
- 2009: Sacramento Monarchs

Career highlights
- First-team All-SEC (2009); NCAA season assists leader (2009); Alabama Miss Basketball (2005)
- Stats at WNBA.com
- Stats at Basketball Reference

Whitney Boddie (born January 23, 1987) is a professional women's basketball player who most recently played for the Sacramento Monarchs.

== High school career ==
Boddie graduated in 2005 from Florence High School of Florence, Alabama and was named 2005 Alabama Miss Basketball.

In 2004, she was as honored as the Alabama Sports Writers Association 6A Player of the Year.

== College career ==
She played women's basketball for Auburn University. Boddie started 80 games for Auburn from 2005 to 2009.

In 2009, she earned AP Honorable Mention All-American, USBWA Honorable Mention All-American, All-SEC First Team (AP and Coaches), and SEC All-Tournament Team.

== WNBA career ==
Boddie was drafted by the Sacramento Monarchs in the 2009 WNBA draft but she was waived before the season began. When Monarchs guard Chelsea Newton had surgery in August 2009, the Monarchs signed Boddie to a seven-day contract.

Boddie also participated in training camp with the New York Liberty.

== International career ==
Boddie played overseas with Utex Row Rybnik (Poland), Botasspor Adana (Turkey) and Helios (Switzerland).

== Personal life ==
Boddie is the head girls basketball coach at South Broward High School in Hollywood, Florida.

She has a sociology degree from Auburn University.

== Career statistics ==
=== WNBA ===
Legend
GP	Games played	GS	Games started	MPG	Minutes per game	RPG	Rebounds per game
APG	Assists per game	SPG	Steals per game	BPG	Blocks per game	PPG	Points per game
TO	Turnovers per game	FG%	Field-goal percentage	3P%	3-point field-goal percentage	FT%	Free-throw percentage
**Bold**	Career best	°	League leader

==== Regular season ====
Year	Team	GP	GS	MPG	FG%	3P%	FT%	RPG	APG	SPG	BPG	TO	PPG
2009	Sacramento	4	0	2.3	100.0	0.0	0.0	0.0	0.0	0.3	0.0	0.3	0.5
Career	1 year, 1 team	4	0	2.3	100.0	0.0	0.0	0.0	0.0	0.3	0.0	0.3	0.5

=== College ===
Legend
GP	Games played	GS	Games started	MPG	Minutes per game	FG%	Field goal percentage	3P%	3-point field goal percentage
FT%	Free throw percentage	RPG	Rebounds per game	APG	Assists per game	SPG	Steals per game	BPG	Blocks per game
TO	Turnovers per game	PPG	Points per game	**Bold**	Career high	*	Led Division I

Year	Team	GP	Points	FG%	3P%	FT%	RPG	APG	SPG	BPG	PPG
2005-06	Auburn	26	196	41.7	-	**86.2**	4.2	4.6	1.7	0.2	7.5
2006-07	Auburn	**33**	269	40.0	-	77.0	4.3	4.8	1.6	0.2	8.2
2007-08	Auburn	11	117	41.7	-	75.6	**6.4**	5.8	**2.1**	-	10.6
2008-09	Auburn	**33**	**369**	**47.5**	-	73.5	4.6	***7.9**	1.9	0.2	**11.2**
Career	Auburn	103	951	43.5	0.0	77.7	4.6	5.9	1.8	0.2	9.2
