= Carbon High School =

Location
- 750 East 400 North; Price, Utah 84501; United States
- Coordinates: 39°36′29″N 110°47′50″W

Information
- Type: Public secondary school
- School district: Carbon School District
- NCES School ID: 490015000089
- Grades: 9-12
- Enrollment: 1,009 (2023-2024)
- Colors: Blue; White
- Athletics: UHSAA
- Athletics conference: Class 3A Region XII
- Mascot: Dinosaur
- Nickname: Dinos
- Website: www.carbonschools.org/o/carbon-high-school

Carbon High School is a high school in Price, Utah, that is part of Carbon School District.

== Athletics ==
Carbon High School athletics participate in the UHSAA in Class 3A Region XII.

=== State championships ===
- Baseball: 1952, 2001, 2005
- Girls basketball: 1997, 2005
- Boys cross country: 2019
- Girls cross country: 2022, 2024
- Football: 1924, 1938, 1951
- Girls swimming: 2019, 2020, 2021
- Boys tennis: 1977
- Girls track: 1980
- Girls volleyball: 2004
