= Tye'sha Fluker =

American basketball player (born 1984)

Personal information
- Born: December 27, 1984 (age 41) Pasadena, California
- Listed height: 6 ft 5 in (1.96 m)
- Listed weight: 209 lb (95 kg)

Career information
- High school: John Muir (Pasadena, California)
- College: Tennessee (2002–2006)
- WNBA draft: 2006: 1st round, 10th overall pick
- Drafted by: Charlotte Sting
- Position: Center

Career history
- 2006: Charlotte Sting
- 2007: Seattle Storm
- 2007: Los Angeles Sparks
- 2008: Chicago Sky

Career highlights
- McDonald's All-American (2002)
- Stats at Basketball Reference

Tye'sha Nicole Fluker (born December 27, 1984) is an American professional basketball player in the WNBA.

== High school ==
Fluker played for Muir High School in Pasadena, California, where she was named a WBCA All-American. She participated in the 2002 WBCA High School All-America Game where she scored three points. She also participated in the 2002 Inaugural Women's McDonald All-American Game

== College ==
Fluker attended college at the University of Tennessee and graduated in 2006. There she helped lead the Lady Vols to three Final Four appearances, two regular season SEC titles, two SEC Tournament crowns and an overall record of 125–19 in her four-year career. Following her collegiate career, she was selected 10th overall in the 2006 WNBA draft by the Charlotte Sting.

== Career statistics ==
=== WNBA career statistics ===
Legend
GP	Games played	GS	Games started	MPG	Minutes per game	RPG	Rebounds per game
APG	Assists per game	SPG	Steals per game	BPG	Blocks per game	PPG	Points per game
TO	Turnovers per game	FG%	Field-goal percentage	3P%	3-point field-goal percentage	FT%	Free-throw percentage
**Bold**	Career best	°	League leader

==== Regular season ====
Year	Team	GP	GS	MPG	FG%	3P%	FT%	RPG	APG	SPG	BPG	TO	PPG
2006	Charlotte	**31**	1	**10.3**	33.7	0.0	72.7	**2.1**	0.3	0.1	0.5	0.7	2.5
2007	Seattle	9	0	3.4	0.0	0.0	50.0	0.8	0.0	0.0	0.1	**0.3**	0.1
2007	Los Angeles	12	0	9.5	**38.6**	**50.0**	57.1	1.6	0.3	**0.3**	**0.6**	0.8	**3.3**
2008	Chicago	26	**2**	8.9	38.5	33.3	**76.0**	1.3	**0.4**	0.2	0.3	0.7	2.7
Career	1 year, 3 teams	78	3	8.9	34.6	25.0	71.4	1.6	0.3	0.1	0.4	0.7	2.4

=== College career statistics ===
Legend
GP	Games played	GS	Games started	MPG	Minutes per game
FG%	Field goal percentage	3P%	3-point field goal percentage	FT%	Free throw percentage
RPG	Rebounds per game	APG	Assists per game	SPG	Steals per game
BPG	Blocks per game	PPG	Points per game	**Bold**	Career high

Year	Team	GP	Points	FG%	3P%	FT%	RPG	APG	SPG	BPG	PPG
2002–03	Tennessee	**36**	110	40.0	**22.2**	57.1	2.5	0.3	0.3	0.4	3.1
2003–04	Tennessee	35	188	48.4	–	63.0	3.1	0.3	0.2	0.7	5.4
2004–05	Tennessee	33	243	46.1	–	64.1	**5.4**	0.5	**0.8**	**0.8**	7.4
2005–06	Tennessee	**36**	**334**	53.2	–	**65.4**	4.9	**0.6**	0.5	0.6	**9.3**
Career	Tennessee	140	875	48.0	18.2	63.6	4.0	0.5	0.4	0.6	6.3

== Professional ==
On January 8, 2007, she was selected by the Seattle Storm as the seventh pick in the 2007 WNBA dispersal draft of former Charlotte Sting players.

On June 5, 2008, she signed with the Chicago Sky.

She played for Ružomberok in Slovakia during the 2008–09 WNBA off-season.

She is playing in Poland for the winter of 2010 in Energa Toruń.
