= Danielle Gant =

American basketball player

Personal information
- Born: March 6, 1987 (age 39) Cleveland, Ohio, U.S.
- Listed height: 5 ft 11 in (1.80 m)

Career information
- High school: Putnam City West (Oklahoma City, Oklahoma)
- College: Texas A&M (2005–2009)
- WNBA draft: 2009: 2nd round, 16th overall pick
- Drafted by: Chicago Sky
- Position: Guard / forward

Career highlights
- Big 12 Defensive Player of the Year (2009); 2× First-team All-Big 12 (2008, 2009); 3× Big 12 All-Defensive Team (2007–2009); Big 12 Sixth Player of the Year (2007)
- Stats at Basketball Reference

Danielle Nicole Gant (born March 6, 1987, in Cleveland, Ohio) is a women's college basketball guard/forward. She was drafted 16th overall by the Chicago Sky in the 2009 WNBA draft. She played college ball for Texas A&M.

== Honors and awards ==
- 2008–09 Team Captain
- Two-Time All-Big 12 First Team by league's coaches (2008, 2009)
- Two-Time State Farm All-America Regional Finalist (2008, 2009)
- Three-Time Big 12 All-Defensive Team (2007, 2008 and 2009)
- 2009 Big 12 Defensive Player of the Year
- Two-Time Big 12 Player of the Week selection (Feb. 25, 2008, and March 3, 2008)
- 2008 All-Big 12 First Team by the Waco Tribune-Herald
- 2008 All-Big 12 Second Team by The Dallas Morning News
- The 21st all-time player to reach 1,000 career points at A&M
- The 17th all-time player to gain entrance into the 500 Rebound Club at A&M
- Named WBCA National Player of the Month Honorable Mention selection for the month of December 2007
- 2007 Paradise Jam St. John Division All-Tournament Team
- Texas A&M's NCAA Tournament Single Game Record Holder In Points (24) and Rebounds (14)
- 2007 All-Big 12 Second Team by league's coaches
- 2007 All-Big 12 Second Team by the Waco Tribune
- 2007 Big 12 Defensive Player of the Year by the Waco Tribune
- 2007 All-Big 12 Second Team by The Dallas Morning News
- 2007 Big 12 Sixth Man Award by league's coaches
- 2005 Hawaiian Airlines Rainbow Wahine Classic All-Tournament Team

== Texas A&M statistics ==
Legend
GP	Games played	GS	Games started	MPG	Minutes per game
FG%	Field goal percentage	3P%	3-point field goal percentage	FT%	Free throw percentage
RPG	Rebounds per game	APG	Assists per game	SPG	Steals per game
BPG	Blocks per game	PPG	Points per game	**Bold**	Career high

Year	Team	GP	Points	FG%	3P%	FT%	RPG	APG	SPG	BPG	PPG
2005–06	Texas A&M	32	272	**58.2**	–	72.3	5.9	1.2	1.4	0.5	8.5
2006–07	Texas A&M	32	347	56.7	–	75.5	**7.3**	2.0	2.0	0.9	10.8
2007–08	Texas A&M	**36**	**529**	52.9	**33.3**	80.0	7.1	2.1	**2.3**	**1.0**	14.7
2008–09	Texas A&M	35	497	53.6	–	**80.4**	6.8	**2.1**	2.2	0.8	**14.2**
Career	Texas A&M	135	1645	54.7	25.0	77.7	6.8	1.9	2.0	0.8	12.2
