= Quianna Chaney =

American basketball player (born 1986)

Personal information
- Born: April 14, 1986 (age 40) Baton Rouge, Louisiana, U.S.
- Listed height: 5 ft 11 in (1.80 m)
- Listed weight: 160 lb (73 kg)

Career information
- High school: Southern Lab (Baton Rouge, Louisiana)
- College: LSU (2004–2008)
- WNBA draft: 2008: 2nd round, 19th overall pick
- Drafted by: Chicago Sky
- Position: Shooting guard

Career history
- 2008: Chicago Sky

Career highlights
- First-team All-SEC (2008); SEC All-Freshman Team (2005); McDonald's All-American (2004)
- Stats at Basketball Reference

Quianna Nehma Chaney (born April 14, 1986) is an American professional basketball player who played for Botaş SK at the Turkish Women's Basketball League. Born in Baton Rouge, Louisiana, she played collegiately for LSU.

== College career ==
From 2004 to 2008, Chaney scored 1345 points for LSU, and was second in school history for three-pointers made and attempted. The Lady Tigers appeared in the NCAA Women's Final Four in all four years. As a Tiger Chaney was part of the 2005 SEC All-Freshman team, she was 2006 Academic All-SEC and 2007 Academic All-SEC, she was part of the 2007 Second-team All-SEC, the 2007 First-team All-Louisiana, the 2008 First-team All-SEC, and the 2008 First-team All-Louisiana. Her LSU teammates Erica White, and Sylvia Fowles also entered the WNBA draft.

== Career statistics ==
=== WNBA career statistics ===
Legend
GP	Games played	GS	Games started	MPG	Minutes per game	RPG	Rebounds per game
APG	Assists per game	SPG	Steals per game	BPG	Blocks per game	PPG	Points per game
TO	Turnovers per game	FG%	Field-goal percentage	3P%	3-point field-goal percentage	FT%	Free-throw percentage
**Bold**	Career best	°	League leader

==== Regular season ====
Year	Team	GP	GS	MPG	FG%	3P%	FT%	RPG	APG	SPG	BPG	TO	PPG
2008	Chicago	28	0	8.6	27.7	24.0	83.3	1.0	0.9	0.5	0.1	0.8	2.4
Career	1 year, 1 team	28	0	8.6	27.7	24.0	83.3	1.0	0.9	0.5	0.1	0.8	2.4

=== College career statistics ===
Legend
GP	Games played	GS	Games started	MPG	Minutes per game
FG%	Field goal percentage	3P%	3-point field goal percentage	FT%	Free throw percentage
RPG	Rebounds per game	APG	Assists per game	SPG	Steals per game
BPG	Blocks per game	PPG	Points per game	**Bold**	Career high

Year	Team	GP	Points	FG%	3P%	FT%	RPG	APG	SPG	BPG	PPG
2004–05	LSU	36	172	37.7	34.8	42.9	0.9	0.8	0.6	0.1	4.8
2005–06	LSU	31	190	39.1	25.3	**76.2**	2.2	1.5	0.8	0.1	6.1
2006–07	LSU	**38**	449	**42.5**	33.8	62.2	**2.8**	2.3	1.5	**0.3**	11.8
2007–08	LSU	37	**534**	42.4	**38.3**	70.3	2.6	**3.3**	**1.6**	0.1	**14.4**
Career	LSU	142	1345	41.3	34.7	66.2	2.1	2.0	1.1	0.2	9.5

== WNBA career ==
In 2008, Chaney was drafted in the second round of the 2008 WNBA draft with the 19th overall pick by the Chicago Sky. After one full season with Chicago, Chaney averaged 8.6 minutes and 2.4 points per game. She played 28 games in her rookie season. In 2009, Chaney played 14 minutes and scored 5 points in a preseason game against the Detroit Shock. This would be the last game Chaney would play with the Sky. She was later waived due to 11-woman roster cuts.

== Overseas ==
She is currently playing for Botas SK in Turkey during the 2011-12 WNBA off-season.
