= Britany Miller =

American basketball player (born 1987)

Embutidos Pajariel Bembibre PDM
- Position: Center
- League: Liga Femenina de Baloncesto

Personal information
- Born: August 10, 1987 (age 39)
- Listed height: 6 ft 4 in (1.93 m)

Career information
- High school: Tallapoosa
- College: Florida State (2005–2007)
- WNBA draft: 2009: 2nd round, 18th overall pick
- Drafted by: Detroit Shock
- Playing career: 2009–2023

Career history
- 2008–2009: Valosun KP Brno
- 2009: Detroit Shock
- 2009–2010: USO Mondeville
- 2010–2011: Lupa Promotion Novi Zagreb
- 2011–2012: Cote d'Opale Basket Calais
- 2012–2013: C.B. Bembibre PDM
- 2013–2015: Gernika Bizkaia
- 2015: Universidad Tecnologica Equinoc
- 2015: Mann Filter Zaragoza
- 2015–2016: CAB Madeira
- 2016–2017: Zichron/Maagan Michael
- 2017–2018: CS Municipal Satu Mare
- 2018: Duran Maquinaria Ensino Lugo
- 2018: Deportivo de Quito
- 2018–2020: Duran Maquinaria Ensino Lugo
- 2021–2022: Embutidos Pajariel Bembibre PDM
- 2022–2023: Duran Maquinaria Ensino Lugo

Career highlights
- LF2 champion (2014); ACC All-Freshman Team (2006)
- Stats at WNBA.com
- Stats at Basketball Reference

Britany Miller (born August 10, 1987) is an American former basketball player. She played college basketball for Florida State before going on to play professionally with the Detroit Shock in the WNBA.

== Florida State statistics ==
Legend
GP	Games played	GS	Games started	MPG	Minutes per game
FG%	Field goal percentage	3P%	3-point field goal percentage	FT%	Free throw percentage
RPG	Rebounds per game	APG	Assists per game	SPG	Steals per game
BPG	Blocks per game	PPG	Points per game	**Bold**	Career high

Year	Team	GP	Points	FG%	3P%	FT%	RPG	APG	SPG	BPG	PPG
2005–06	Florida State	30	314	**52.3**	–	35.3	5.1	**0.3**	0.7	1.3	10.5
2006–07	Florida State	**34**	**427**	51.3	–	**57.3**	**6.1**	0.2	0.8	**1.6**	**12.6**
2007–08	Florida State	6	57	51.0	–	50.0	4.0	0.2	**1.2**	1.5	9.5
Career	Florida State	70	798	51.7		50.0	5.5	0.2	0.8	1.5	11.4
