= 2009 WNBA draft =

2009 meeting of WNBA teams to select players

General information
- Sport: Basketball
- Date: December 8, 2008 – April 9, 2009
- Location: Secaucus, New Jersey
- Networks: ESPN2, NBATV, ESPNU

Overview
- League: WNBA
- Merging teams: Houston Comets (folded in 2008)
- First selection: Angel McCoughtry; Atlanta Dream

The 2009 WNBA draft is the league's annual process for determining which teams receive the rights to negotiate with players entering the league. The draft was held on April 9, 2009. The first round was shown on ESPN2 (in HD for the first time ever) at 3:00pm ET, while the second and third rounds were shown on ESPNU and NBA TV at 4:00pm.

Additionally, on December 8, 2008, the WNBA held a dispersal draft to re-assign players from the Houston Comets who folded at the end of 2008 WNBA season.

Some of the top draftees were Angel McCoughtry, Marissa Coleman, Kristi Toliver, Renee Montgomery, and DeWanna Bonner. As of 2026, Bonner is the only remaining active WNBA player in this draft, as well as the last remaining WNBA player drafted in the 2000s.

== Draft lottery ==
A lottery was held on December 9, 2008. The Atlanta Dream received the first overall selection of upcoming 2009 draft. The Washington Mystics received the number two selection. The Chicago Sky came up with the third overall selection, followed by the Minnesota Lynx at four, the Phoenix Mercury at number five. For the first time in WNBA history, the lottery balls were chosen exactly according to odds.

== Transactions ==
- The Washington Mystics received the first-round pick from the Los Angeles Sparks.
- The Atlanta Dream received the first-round pick from the San Antonio Silver Stars.
- The San Antonio Silver Stars received the second-round pick from the Atlanta Dream.
- The Connecticut Sun and the Minnesota Lynx had rights to swap second-round picks.
- The Washington Mystics received the second-round pick from the Detroit Shock.
- The Atlanta Dream received the second-round pick from the Seattle Storm.
- The Phoenix Mercury received the third-round pick from the New York Liberty.
- The Minnesota Lynx received the first-round and second-round pick from the Washington Mystics
- The Detroit Shock received the second-round pick from the Atlanta Dream.

== Key ==
!	Denotes player who has been inducted to the Naismith Basketball Hall of Fame
^	Denotes player who has been inducted to the Women's Basketball Hall of Fame
*	Denotes player who has been selected for at least one All-Star Game and All-WNBA Team
^{+}	Denotes player who has been selected for at least one All-Star Game
^{#}	Denotes player who never played in the WNBA regular season or playoffs
**Bold**	Denotes player who won Rookie of the Year

== Draft ==
=== Round 1 ===
Pick	Player	Nationality	Team	School / club team
1	**Angel McCoughtry** *	United States	Atlanta Dream	Louisville
2	Marissa Coleman ^{+}	United States	Washington Mystics	Maryland
3	Kristi Toliver *	United States	Chicago Sky	Maryland
4	Renee Montgomery ^{+}	United States	Minnesota Lynx	Connecticut
5	DeWanna Bonner *	United States	Phoenix Mercury	Auburn
6	Briann January ^{+}	United States	Indiana Fever	Arizona State
7	Courtney Paris	United States	Sacramento Monarchs	Oklahoma
8	Kia Vaughn	United States	New York Liberty	Rutgers
9	Quanitra Hollingsworth	United States	Minnesota Lynx (from Los Angeles, via Washington)	VCU
10	Chante Black	United States	Connecticut Sun	Duke
11	Shavonte Zellous ^{+}	United States	Detroit Shock	Pittsburgh
12	Ashley Walker	United States	Seattle Storm	California
13	Lindsay Wisdom-Hylton	United States	Los Angeles Sparks (from San Antonio, via Atlanta) (Note: April 9, 2008: San Antonio to Atlanta: San Antonio acquired Ann Wauters, Morenike Atunrase, and a 2009 second round draft pick; Atlanta acquired Camille Little, Chioma Nnamaka, and a 2009 first round draft pick)	Purdue

=== Round 2 ===
Pick	Player	Nationality	Team	School / club team
14	Megan Frazee	United States	San Antonio Silver Stars (from Atlanta)	Liberty
15	Rashanda McCants	United States	Minnesota Lynx (from Washington)	North Carolina
16	Danielle Gant ^{#}	United States	Chicago Sky	Texas A&M
17	Lyndra Littles ^{#}	United States	Connecticut Sun (from Minnesota)	Virginia
18	Britany Miller	United States	Detroit Shock (from Phoenix, via Atlanta)	Florida State
19	Christina Wirth	United States	Indiana Fever	Vanderbilt
20	Whitney Boddie	United States	Sacramento Monarchs	Auburn
21	Abby Waner ^{#}	United States	New York Liberty	Duke
22	Ashley Paris ^{#}	United States	Los Angeles Sparks	Oklahoma
23	Camille LeNoir ^{#}	United States	Washington Mystics (from Connecticut, via Minnesota)	USC
24	Jelena Milovanović	Serbia	Washington Mystics (from Detroit)	MKB Euroleasing Sopron (Hungary)
25	Shalee Lehning	United States	Atlanta Dream (from Seattle)	Kansas State
26	Sonja Petrović	Serbia	San Antonio Silver Stars	Spartak Moscow Region (Russia)

=== Round 3 ===
Pick	Player	Nationality	Team	School / club team
27	Jessica Morrow ^{#}	United States	Atlanta Dream	Baylor
28	Josephine Owino ^{#}	Kenya	Washington Mystics	Union
29	Jenifer Risper ^{#}	United States	Chicago Sky	Vanderbilt
30	Emily Fox ^{#}	United States	Minnesota Lynx	Minnesota
31	Sha Brooks ^{#}	United States	Phoenix Mercury	Florida
32	Danielle Campbell ^{#}	United States	Indiana Fever	Purdue
33	Morgan Warburton ^{#}	United States	Sacramento Monarchs	Utah
34	Jessica Adair	United States	Phoenix Mercury (from New York)	George Washington
35	Britney Jordan ^{#}	United States	Los Angeles Sparks	Texas A&M–Commerce
36	Alba Torrens ^{#}	Spain	Connecticut Sun	Real Club Celta Indepo (Spain)
37	Tanae Davis-Cain	United States	Detroit Shock	Florida State
38	Mara Freshour ^{#}	United States	Seattle Storm	Florida State
39	Candyce Bingham ^{#}	United States	San Antonio Silver Stars	Louisville

== See also ==
- List of first overall WNBA draft picks
