= 2006 Indiana Fever season =

7th season in the WNBA

- Head coach: Brian Winters
- Arena: Conseco Fieldhouse

Results
- Record: 21–13 (.618)
- Place: 3rd (Eastern)
- Playoff finish: Lost First Round (2-0) to Detroit Shock

The 2006 Indiana Fever season was the franchise's 7th season in the WNBA and their 3rd season under head coach, Brian Winters. The Fever matched their record from 2005, but lost in the first round to eventual champion Detroit Shock.

This was also the first season the Fever started games at the same local time with other teams in the Eastern Time Zone, as the State of Indiana began observing Daylight Saving Time earlier in the year.

== Offseason ==
- Deanna Jackson was selected by the Chicago Sky in the 2006 WNBA Expansion Draft.

=== WNBA draft ===
Round	Pick	Player	Nationality	School/Club team
1	9	La'Tangela Atkinson (G/F)	United States	North Carolina
2	26	Kasha Terry (F)	United States	Georgia Tech
3	38	Jessica Foley (G)	Australia	Duke

== Regular season ==
=== Season standings ===
Eastern Conference	W	L	PCT	GB	Home	Road	Conf.
z - Connecticut Sun	26	8	.765	–	14–3	12–5	15–5
x - Detroit Shock	23	11	.676	3.0	14–3	9–8	14–6
x - Indiana Fever	21	13	.618	5.0	12–5	9–8	12–8
x - Washington Mystics	18	16	.529	8.0	13–4	5–12	12–8
e - New York Liberty	11	23	.324	15.0	7–10	4–13	7–13
e - Charlotte Sting	11	23	.324	15.0	7–10	4–3	6–14
e - Chicago Sky	5	29	.147	21.0	3–14	2–15	4–16

=== Season schedule ===
Date	Opponent	Score	Result	Record
May 20	Detroit	67-60	Win	1–0
May 23	@ San Antonio	62-53	Win	2–0
May 26	@ Chicago	75-60	Win	3–0
May 30	New York	91-70	Win	4–0
May 31	@ Houston	60-73	Loss	4–1
June 2	@ Minnesota	87-92	Loss	4–2
June 7	Washington	83-70	Win	5–2
June 9	@ Charlotte	59-70	Loss	5–3
June 11	Seattle	69-62	Win	6–3
June 13	@ New York	80-78 (OT)	Win	7–3
June 16	@ Detroit	63-71	Loss	7–4
June 18	Charlotte	92-85 (OT)	Win	8–4
June 21	Chicago	77-55	Win	9–4
June 23	@ Phoenix	83-73	Win	10–4
June 25	@ Sacramento	61-82	Loss	10–5
June 27	@ Washington	74-67	Win	11–5
June 29	Detroit	66-56	Win	12–5
July 1	Connecticut	66-76	Loss	12–6
July 7	@ Los Angeles	60-72	Loss	12–7
July 9	@ Seattle	74-62	Win	13–7
July 15	@ Charlotte	65-75	Loss	13–8
July 16	Houston	60-56	Win	14–8
July 18	Phoenix	71-65	Win	15–8
July 22	Los Angeles	68-73	Loss	15–9
July 25	Sacramento	75-60	Win	16–9
July 29	Washington	67-74	Loss	16–10
July 30	@ Chicago	69-64	Win	17–10
August 1	@ Detroit	66-70	Loss	17–11
August 3	Minnesota	69-59	Win	18–11
August 5	San Antonio	76-70	Win	19–11
August 8	@ New York	77-44	Win	20–11
August 9	Connecticut	63-71	Loss	20–12
August 11	@ Connecticut	87-68	Win	21–12
August 13	Chicago	73-80	Loss	21–13

== Playoffs ==
Game	Date	Opponent	Score	Result	Record
Eastern Conference Semifinals
1	August 17	Detroit	56-68	Loss	0–1
2	August 19	@ Detroit	83-98	Loss	0–2

== Player stats ==
Player	GP	REB	AST	STL	BLK	PTS
Tamika Whitmore	34	165	61	46	12	528
Tamika Catchings	32	240	119	94	35	521
Anna DeForge	34	146	76	39	9	348
Tan White	34	82	52	27	9	302
Tully Bevilaqua	34	77	79	71	1	223
Ebony Hoffman	34	193	46	37	16	218
La'Tangela Atkinson	33	76	22	18	5	99
Linda Frohlich	20	35	9	5	0	66
Olympia Scott	21	33	7	7	2	50
Charlotte Smith	18	24	7	3	1	35
Kasha Terry	10	14	0	0	3	23
K.B. Sharp	23	9	23	7	0	22

== Awards and honors ==
- Tamika Catchings, WNBA Defensive Player of the Year Award
