= 2008 WNBA expansion draft =

5th WNBA expansion draft

General information
- Sport: Basketball
- Date: February 6, 2008

Overview
- League: WNBA
- Expansion team: Atlanta Dream

The Women's National Basketball Association (WNBA) held their fifth expansion draft on February 6, 2008, for the Atlanta Dream. This draft allowed the Atlanta Dream to select players from the existing WNBA teams to fill their debut roster prior to the start of the 2008 WNBA season.

The existing 13 WNBA teams were allowed to protect a maximum of six players from their 2007 rosters. The Dream were then permitted to select one unprotected player from each team but only one unrestricted free agent.

== Key ==
| Pos. | G | F | C |
| Position | Guard | Forward | Center |

| ! | Denotes player who has been inducted to the Naismith Basketball Hall of Fame |
| ^ | Denotes player who has been inducted to the Women's Basketball Hall of Fame |
| * | Denotes player who has been selected for at least one All-Star Game and All-WNBA Team |
| ^{+} | Denotes player who has been selected for at least one All-Star Game |

== Expansion draft ==
The following players were drafted for the roster of the Dream from the league's existing teams on February 6, 2008:

| Pick | Player | Position | Nationality | Former team | WNBA years (Note: Number of years played in the WNBA prior to the draft) | Career with the franchise (Note: Number of years played for expansion franchise that drafted player) | Ref. |
|---|---|---|---|---|---|---|---|
| 1 | Carla Thomas | F/C | United States | Chicago Sky | 1 | — | |
| 2 | Érika de Souza ^{+} | C | Brazil | Connecticut Sun | 2 | 2008–2015 | |
| 3 | Katie Feenstra | C | United States | Detroit Shock | 3 | 2008 | |
| 4 | Roneeka Hodges (traded to Seattle) (Note: February 6, 2008: Atlanta to Seattle: Atlanta acquired Iziane Castro Marques and the 2008 No. 8 draft pick; Seattle acquired Roneeka Hodges and the 2008 No. 4 draft pick) | G | United States | Houston Comets | 3 | — | |
| 5 | Ann Strother | G/F | United States | Indiana Fever (Note: February 6, 2008: Indiana to Atlanta: Indiana acquired agreement from Atlanta to not select specific unprotected Fever players in the expansion draft; Atlanta acquired the 2008 No. 24 draft pick) | 2 | 2008 | |
| 6 | LaToya Thomas (traded to Detroit) (Note: February 6, 2008: Atlanta to Detroit: Atlanta acquired Ivory Latta; Seattle acquired LaToya Thomas and the 2008 No. 18 draft pick) | F | United States | Los Angeles Sparks | 5 | — | |
| 7 | Kristen Mann | F | United States | Minnesota Lynx | 3 | 2008 | |
| 8 | Ann Wauters ^{+} (traded to San Antonio) (Note: April 9, 2008: San Antonio to Atlanta: San Antonio acquired Ann Wauters, Morenike Atunrase, and a 2009 second round draft pick; Atlanta acquired Camille Little, Chioma Nnamaka, and a 2009 first round draft pick) | C | Belgium | New York Liberty | 5 | — | |
| 9 | Jennifer Lacy | F | United States | Phoenix Mercury | 2 | 2008–2009 | |
| 10 | Kristin Haynie | G | United States | Sacramento Monarchs | 3 | 2008 | |
| 11 | Chantelle Anderson | C | United States | San Antonio Silver Stars | 5 | — | |
| 12 | Betty Lennox * | G | United States | Seattle Storm | 8 | 2008 | |
| 13 | Yelena Leuchanka | C | Belarus | Washington Mystics | 2 | 2010; 2012 | |
