= 2009 Atlanta Dream season =

- Head coach: Marynell Meadors
- Arena: Philips Arena

Results
- Record: 18–16 (.529)
- Place: 2nd (Eastern)
- Playoff finish: E2; Lost in First Round 0–2 to Detroit

The 2009 Atlanta Dream season was the 2nd season for the Atlanta Dream of the Women's National Basketball Association, and their second season under head coach, Marynell Meadors. The Dream qualified for the playoffs for the first time in franchise history. However, they were eliminated by the Detroit Shock in a sweep in the first round.

== Transactions ==
=== Houston Comets Dispersal Draft ===
With the Houston Comets ceasing operation and based on the 2008 records of teams, the Dream selected 1st in the Dispersal Draft.

Pick	Player	Nationality	College	Previous team
1	Sancho Lyttle	Spain	Houston	Houston Comets

=== WNBA draft ===
Round	Pick	Player	Nationality	School/Team/Country
1	1	Angel McCoughtry	United States	Louisville
2	25	Shalee Lehning	United States	Kansas State
3	27	Jessica Morrow	United States	Baylor

=== Trades and Roster Changes ===
Date	Trade
December 8, 2008	Traded a First Round Pick in the 2009 WNBA draft to the Los Angeles Sparks in exchange for the rights to Chamique Holdsclaw
January 2, 2009	Extended Qualifying Offers to Kasha Terry, Yelena Leuchanka, and Jennifer Lacy
January 12, 2009	Signed Nikki Teasley
January 14, 2009	Waived Ann Strother and Chioma Nnamaka
January 14, 2009	Rescinded the Qualifying Offer to Kasha Terry
January 21, 2009	Traded Alison Bales to the Phoenix Mercury for a Second Round Pick in the 2009 WNBA draft
February 3, 2009	Waived Betty Lennox
February 4, 2009	Waived Kasha Terry
February 11, 2009	Signed Chantelle Anderson to a Training Camp Contract
February 17, 2009	Signed Jennifer Lacy to a Training Camp Contract
February 18, 2009	Signed Michelle Snow to a Training Camp Contract
April 8, 2009	Waived Katie Mattera
April 9, 2009	Traded a Second Round Pick in the 2009 WNBA draft to the Detroit Shock in exchange for Ashley Shields
April 13, 2009	Waived Kristin Haynie
April 14, 2009	Signed Angel McCoughtry, Shalee Lehning, and Jessica Morrow to Rookie Scale Contracts
April 20, 2009	Signed Chamique Holdsclaw
April 28, 2009	Waived Ashley Shields
May 11, 2009	Waived Jessica Morrow
May 12, 2009	Signed Marlies Gipson to a Training Camp Contract
May 15, 2009	Signed Coco Miller
May 29, 2009	Waived Marlies Gipson
May 31, 2009	Waived Chantelle Anderson
June 3, 2009	Waived Ivory Latta
July 3, 2009	Waived Nikki Teasley
July 3, 2009	Signed Ivory Latta
August 12, 2009	Traded Tamera Young to the Chicago Sky in exchange for Armintie Price

== Roster ==
2009 Atlanta Dream roster
Players
Coaches

Pos.	No.	Nat.	Name	Height	Weight	From
G/F	8	(Brazil)	Castro Marques, Iziane	6' 0" (1.83m)	140 lb (64kg)	Brazil
F/C	14	(Brazil)	DeSouza, Erika	6' 5" (1.96m)	190 lb (86kg)	Brazil
F	1	(United States)	Holdsclaw, Chamique	6' 2" (1.88m)	172 lb (78kg)	Tennessee
F	21	(United States)	Lacy, Jennifer	6' 3" (1.91m)	175 lb (79kg)	Pepperdine
G	12	(United States)	Latta, Ivory	5' 6" (1.68m)	143 lb (65kg)	North Carolina
G	5	(United States)	Lehning, Shalee	5' 9" (1.75m)	147 lb (67kg)	Kansas State
F	20	(Saint Vincent and the Grenadines)	Lyttle, Sancho	6' 4" (1.93m)	143 lb (65kg)	Houston
F	35	(United States)	McCoughtry, Angel	6' 1" (1.85m)	160 lb (73kg)	Louisville
SG	9	(United States)	Miller, Coco	5' 9" (1.75m)	140 lb (64kg)	Georgia
G/F	22	(United States)	Price, Armintie	5' 9" (1.75m)	133 lb (60kg)	Mississippi
C	2	(United States)	Snow, Michelle	6' 5" (1.96m)	158 lb (72kg)	Tennessee

Head coach
(United States) Marynell Meadors (Middle Tennessee)
Assistant coaches
(United States) Carol Ross (Mississippi)
(United States) Fred Williams (Boise State)
(United States) Sue Panek
Athletic trainer
(United States) Kara Dolling
Strength and conditioning coach
(United States) Jackie Ansley (Virginia Tech)

Legend

- (C) Team captain
- (DP) Unsigned draft pick
- (FA) Free agent
- (S) Suspended
- Injured

WNBA roster page

=== Depth ===
Pos.	Starter	Bench
C	Érika de Souza	Michelle Snow
PF	Sancho Lyttle	Jennifer Lacy
SF	Chamique Holdsclaw	Angel McCoughtry
SG	Iziane Castro Marques	Armintie Price
PG	Shalee Lehning	Ivory Latta; Coco Miller

== Schedule ==
2009 Preseason Schedule
Total: 1–0 (Home: 1–0; Road: 0–0)

Game	Date	Time (ET)	Opponent	Score	High points	High rebounds	High assists	Location/Attendance	Record
1	May 27	7:00pm	Connecticut	76-73	de Souza, Holdsclaw (16)	de Souza (9)	Teasley (7)	Philips Arena; 4,980	1-0

=== Regular season ===
2009 Regular Season
Total: 18–16 (Home: 12–5; Road: 6–11)
June: 4–6 (Home: 3–3; Road: 1–3)

Game	Date	Time	Opponent	TV	Score	High points	High rebounds	High assists	Location/Attendance	Record
1	June 6	7:00pm	Indiana		87-86 (2OT)	Holdsclaw (23)	de Souza (17)	Holdsclaw, Teasley (4)	Philips Arena; 8,709	1-0
2	June 7	4:00pm	@ Washington		71-77	Miller (17)	de Souza (6)	Lehning (4)	Verizon Center; 11,759	1-1
3	June 12	8:30pm	@ Chicago	CN100; NBA TV	73-81	Castro Marques (20)	de Souza (8)	Miller (4)	UIC Pavilion; 5,689	1-2
4	June 14	3:00pm	@ Connecticut		67-62	Lyttle (20)	Lyttle (16)	Teasley (5)	Mohegan Sun Arena; 6,429	2-2
5	June 19	7:30pm	Washington		93-81	Lyttle (20)	Lyttle (13)	Teasley (4)	Philips Arena; 6,050	3-2
6	June 21	3:00pm	New York		81-93	Holdsclaw (17)	Lyttle (9)	Teasley (5)	Philips Arena; 5,624	3-3
7	June 23	12:00pm	Chicago		98-99 (OT)	McCoughtry (26)	de Souza (7)	McCoughtry (8)	Philips Arena; 10,351	3-4
8	June 26	7:30pm	Detroit		96-86	Holdsclaw (28)	de Souza (13)	Teasley (11)	Philips Arena; 5,935	4-4
9	June 27	7:00pm	@ Connecticut		68-82	Castro Marques (16)	Snow (9)	Lehning (4)	Mohegan Sun Arena; 6,264	4-5
10	June 30	7:00pm	Minnesota	ESPN2	85-91	Castro Marques (31)	de Souza (10)	Lehning (4)	Philips Arena; 7,686	4-6

July: 5–4 (Home: 3–0; Road: 2–4)

Game	Date	Time	Opponent	TV	Score	High points	High rebounds	High assists	Location/Attendance	Record
11	July 3	7:30pm	Washington		72-65	Holdsclaw (18)	Lacy, Snow (8)	Holdsclaw (8)	Philips Arena; 5,456	5-6
12	July 5	6:00pm	@ Indiana		74-78	Lyttle (18)	de Souza (8)	Lehning, McCoughtry (4)	Conseco Fieldhouse; 7,024	5-7
13	July 7	7:30pm	Connecticut		72-67	Holdsclaw (19)	de Souza (17)	Lehning (7)	Philips Arena; 6,225	6-7
14	July 11	7:30pm	@ New York		69-71	Castro Marques (18)	Castro Marques, de Souza, Holdsclaw (8)	Castro Marques (6)	Madison Square Garden; 8,732	6-8
15	July 15	1:00pm	@ Minnesota	FSN-N	91-77	Holdsclaw (28)	Lyttle (10)	Lehning (5)	Target Center; 11,245	7-8
16	July 17	7:00pm	@ Indiana		79-84	de Souza (23)	de Souza (14)	Castro Marques, Lehning (3)	Conseco Fieldhouse; 7,975	7-9
17	July 19	4:00pm	@ New York		86-89	Holdsclaw (26)	de Souza (10)	de Souza (3)	Madison Square Garden; 8,560	7-10
18	July 22	12:00pm	@ Detroit		98-95 (OT)	Latta (22)	Snow (12)	Holdsclaw (4)	Palace of Auburn Hills; 14,439	8-10
19	July 30	7:30pm	Phoenix		106-76	McCoughtry (17)	de Souza (14)	Lehning (5)	Philips Arena; 7,827	9-10

August: 6–4 (Home: 5–2; Road: 1–2)

Game	Date	Time	Opponent	TV	Score	High points	High rebounds	High assists	Location/Attendance	Record
20	August 1	7:00pm	New York	NBA TV; MSG	89-83	Holdsclaw (18)	Holdsclaw, Lyttle (7)	Latta, Lehning (3)	Philips Arena; 6,103	10-10
21	August 6	8:00pm	@ San Antonio		92-84	Holdsclaw (21)	Lyttle (10)	Lehning (7)	AT&T Center; 5,042	11-10
22	August 8	7:00pm	Chicago		80-82	Latta (18)	de Souza (15)	Latta, Miller (3)	Philips Arena; 5,424	11-11
23	August 13	7:30pm	Detroit		80-75	Castro Marques (16)	de Souza (13)	Lehning (5)	Philips Arena; 5,641	12-11
24	August 15	7:00pm	Seattle		88-79	Lyttle (20)	de Souza (12)	Lehning (6)	Philips Arena; 8,751	13-11
25	August 20	7:30pm	San Antonio		93-87	McCoughtry (34)	de Souza (11)	Lehning (6)	Philips Arena; 5,848	14-11
26	August 23	3:00pm	Los Angeles		87-91	Castro Marques (26)	de Souza (9)	Castro Marques, Lehning (4)	Philips Arena; 11,304	14-12
27	August 25	7:30pm	Sacramento		103-83	Castro Marques (30)	Lyttle (9)	Lehning (10)	Philips Arena; 5,159	15-12
28	August 27	7:30pm	@ Detroit		83-87	Castro Marques (19)	de Souza (13)	McCoughtry (5)	Palace of Auburn Hills; 5,695	15-13
29	August 29	10:00pm	@ Seattle		84-91 (2OT)	McCoughtry (16)	Lyttle (11)	Lehning, McCoughtry (4)	KeyArena; 9,089	15-14

September: 3–2 (Home: 1–0; Road: 2–2)

Game	Date	Time	Opponent	TV	Score	High points	High rebounds	High assists	Location/Attendance	Record
30	September 1	10:30pm	@ Los Angeles		84-79	Castro Marques (27)	de Souza, Lyttle (7)	de Souza, Latta (3)	STAPLES Center; 8,756	16-14
31	September 4	10:00pm	@ Sacramento		98-90	de Souza (27)	de Souza (13)	McCoughtry (10)	ARCO Arena; 6,517	17-14
32	September 5	10:00pm	@ Phoenix		82-100	de Souza (23)	Snow (7)	Lehning (10)	US Airways Center; 10,424	17-15
33	September 11	7:00pm	Connecticut		88-64	McCoughtry (18)	de Souza (14)	Lyttle (5)	Philips Arena; 8,644	18-15
34	September 12	7:00pm	@ Washington		64-82	McCoughtry (19)	McCoughtry (13)	Castro Marques, de Souza (3)	Verizon Center; 11,987	18-16

All games are viewable on WNBA LiveAccess

=== Postseason ===
2009 Postseason Schedule
Eastern Conference Semifinals vs. Detroit (Lost Series 0-2)

Game	Date	Time (ET)	Opponent	TV	Score	High points	High rebounds	High assists	Location/Attendance	Series
1	September 16	8:00pm	@ Detroit	ESPN2	89-94	Castro Marques (25)	Lyttle (9)	Castro Marques (7)	Palace of Auburn Hills; 6,122	0-1
2	September 18	7:30pm	Detroit	NBA TV	79-94	Latta (21)	de Souza (7)	McCoughtry, Latta, Price (3)	Gwinnett Arena; 4,780	0-2

== Standings ==
Eastern Conference	W	L	PCT	GB	Home	Road	Conf.
Indiana Fever ^{x}	22	12	.647	–	14–3	8–9	17–5
Atlanta Dream ^{x}	18	16	.529	4.0	12–5	6–11	10–12
Detroit Shock ^{x}	18	16	.529	4.0	11–6	7–10	11–11
Washington Mystics ^{x}	16	18	.471	6.0	11–6	5–12	10–12
Chicago Sky ^{o}	16	18	.471	6.0	12–5	4–13	10–12
Connecticut Sun ^{o}	16	18	.471	6.0	12–5	4–13	9–12
New York Liberty ^{o}	13	21	.382	9.0	8–9	5–12	8–13

== Playoffs ==
**Conference semifinals** Best-of-3
E1	**Indiana**	2
E4	Washington	0
**Eastern Conference**
E2	Atlanta	0
E3	**Detroit**	2
W1	**Phoenix**	2
W4	San Antonio	1
**Western Conference**
W2	Seattle	1
W3	**Los Angeles**	2

**Conference finals** Best-of-3
E1	**Indiana**	2
E3	Detroit	1
W1	**Phoenix**	2
W3	Los Angeles	1

**WNBA Finals**; Best-of-5
E1	Indiana	2
W1	**Phoenix**	3

- **Bold** – Series winner
- Italic – Team with home-court advantage

== Statistics ==
Legend
GP	Games played	GS	Games started	MPG	Minutes per game	RPG	Rebounds per game
APG	Assists per game	SPG	Steals per game	BPG	Blocks per game	PPG	Points per game
FG%	Field-goal percentage	3P%	3-point field-goal percentage	FT%	Free-throw percentage	TO	Turnovers per game
PF	Fouls per game		Team leader		League leader

=== Regular season ===
Player	GP	GS	MPG	FG%	3P%	FT%	RPG	APG	SPG	BPG	PPG
Iziane Castro Marques	34	33	26.9	41.3	34.5	78.0	2.2	2.0	1.1	0.1	14.4
Chamique Holdsclaw	25	25	28.3	41.4	20.0	83.9	4.4	2.2	1.4	0.3	13.9
Sancho Lyttle	34	31	27.4	50.7	0.0	74.3	7.5	1.5	2.0	0.6	13.0
Angel McCoughtry	34	10	21.6	47.6	29.4	74.1	3.1	2.1	2.2	0.4	12.8
Erika de Souza	34	34	27.3	52.8	0.0	65.3	9.1	1.1	0.9	1.3	11.8
Ivory Latta	24	0	14.6	40.9	36.0	82.6	0.7	1.4	0.5	0.0	6.1
Michelle Snow	34	2	14.8	47.9	0.0	76.1	4.3	0.5	0.4	0.5	5.4
Nikki Teasley	10	10	23.4	40.0	41.2	80.0	1.7	3.5	0.9	0.1	3.9
Coco Miller	34	5	12.0	41.0	29.6	88.5	1.5	1.0	0.4	0.1	3.9
Shalee Lehning	34	20	20.8	38.7	20.0	77.4	2.3	3.7	0.5	0.1	3.0
Jennifer Lacy	32	0	11.3	32.7	21.1	66.7	2.2	0.3	0.3	0.2	3.0
Tamera Young	11	0	6.5	33.3	20.0	64.7	1.3	0.5	0.5	0.1	2.7
Armintie Price	11	0	8.9	35.7	0.0	60.0	1.5	0.4	0.3	0.2	1.5

=== Playoffs ===
Player	GP	GS	MPG	FG%	3P%	FT%	RPG	APG	SPG	BPG	PPG
Angel McCoughtry	2	2	29.0	48.4	57.1	66.7	5.5	3.0	1.0	0.0	19.0
Iziane Castro Marques	2	2	25.5	50.0	50.0	70.6	1.5	4.5	0.0	0.0	16.0
Ivory Latta	2	2	37.5	40.0	33.3	88.9	2.0	2.5	0.5	0.0	13.5
Erika de Souza	2	2	27.0	55.6	0.0	75.0	7.0	1.0	2.0	1.0	11.5
Sancho Lyttle	2	2	25.5	41.2	0.0	42.9	5.0	2.0	2.0	0.0	5.0
Armintie Price	2	0	15.5	33.3	0.0	57.1	3.0	2.0	2.0	0.0	5.0
Michelle Snow	2	0	16.5	30.0	0.0	60.0	4.0	0.5	0.0	1.0	4.5
Coco Miller	2	0	6.5	60.0	100.0	0.0	0.0	1.0	0.0	0.0	3.5
Chamique Holdsclaw	1	0	13.0	25.0	0.0	100.0	3.0	0.0	0.0	0.0	3.0
Jennifer Lacy	2	0	11.5	0.0	0.0	50.0	1.0	0.0	0.0	0.0	1.0

== Awards and honors ==
Recipient	Award	Date awarded	Ref.
Sancho Lyttle	Eastern Conference Player of the Week	August 17	
Sancho Lyttle	2009 WNBA All-Star Selection	July 20	
Sancho Lyttle	All-Defensive Second Team	September 25	
Angel McCoughtry	All-Defensive Second Team	September 25	
Angel McCoughtry	WNBA Rookie of the Year	October 1	
Angel McCoughtry	WNBA All-Rookie Team	October 1	
Érika de Souza	2009 WNBA All-Star Selection	July 20	
Marynell Meadors	WNBA Coach of the Year	October 1	
