= 2008 Atlanta Dream season =

- Head coach: Marynell Meadors
- Arena: Philips Arena

Results
- Record: 4–30 (.118)
- Place: 7th (Eastern)
- Playoff finish: Did not qualify

The 2008 Atlanta Dream season was the debut season for the Atlanta Dream of the Women's National Basketball Association, and their first season under head coach, Marynell Meadors. The team name was unveiled on January 23, 2008, with the expansion draft held on February 6. The Atlanta Dream had seventeen straight losses. It was the longest losing streak to start a season in WNBA history.

== Transactions ==
=== Expansion draft ===
The list of players selected in the expansion draft were as follows:

Player	Nationality	Former WNBA Team
Carla Thomas	United States	Chicago Sky
Érika de Souza	Brazil	Connecticut Sun
Katie Feenstra	United States	Detroit Shock
Roneeka Hodges	United States	Houston Comets
Ann Strother	United States	Indiana Fever
LaToya Thomas	United States	Los Angeles Sparks
Kristen Mann	United States	Minnesota Lynx
Ann Wauters	Belgium	New York Liberty
Jennifer Lacy	United States	Phoenix Mercury
Kristin Haynie	United States	Sacramento Monarchs
Chantelle Anderson	United States	San Antonio Silver Stars
Betty Lennox	United States	Seattle Storm
Yelena Leuchanka	Belarus	Washington Mystics

Additionally, Atlanta immediately orchestrated three trades involving players in the expansion draft.

Trade
To Atlanta Dream	To Detroit Shock
Ivory Latta	LaToya Thomas and the 18th pick in the 2008 WNBA draft
To Atlanta Dream	To Seattle Storm
Iziane Castro Marques and the 8th pick in the 2008 WNBA draft	Roneeka Hodges and the 4th pick in the 2008 WNBA draft
To Atlanta Dream	To Indiana Fever
24th pick in the 2008 Draft	Agreeing not to select specific unprotected Fever players

=== WNBA draft ===
Round	Pick	Player	Nationality	School/Team/Country
1	8	Tamera Young	United States	James Madison
2	24	Morenike Atunrase	United States	Texas A&M
3	32	Danielle Hood	United States	Hartford

=== Trades and Roster Changes ===
Date	Transaction
February 6, 2008	Traded LaToya Thomas and a Second Round Pick in the 2008 WNBA draft to the Detroit Shock in exchange for Ivory Latta
February 6, 2008	Traded Roneeka Hodges and a First Round Pick in the 2008 WNBA draft to the Seattle Storm in exchange for Iziane Castro Marques and a First Round Pick in the 2008 WNBA draft
February 6, 2008	Agreed to not select any specific unprotected Indiana Fever players in exchange for the Fever's Second Round Pick in the 2008 WNBA draft
February 25, 2008	Signed Tasha Butts
March 24, 2008	Signed Jennifer Lacy and Brittany Jackson to Training Camp Contracts
March 27, 2008	Signed Stacey Lovelace
April 9, 2008	Traded Ann Wauters, the draft rights to Morenike Atunrase, and a Second Round Pick in the 2009 WNBA draft to the San Antonio Silver Stars in exchange for Camille Little, the draft rights to Chioma Nnamaka and a Second Round Pick in the 2009 WNBA draft
April 11, 2008	Signed Jessica Dickson to a Training Camp Contract
April 14, 2008	Signed Danielle Hood, Chioma Nnamaka, Tamera Young, and Jessica Dickson to Rookie Scale Contracts
April 18, 2008	Signed Dalila Eshe to a Training Camp Contract
April 22, 2008	Signed Jill Ingram to a Training Camp Contract
May 4, 2008	Waived Brittany Jackson and Dalila Este
May 5, 2008	Waived Tasha Butts
May 14, 2008	Waived Jill Ingram, Jessica Dickson, and Danielle Hood
May 15, 2008	Signed Katie Feenstra, Kristin Haynie, and Kristen Mann to Contract Extensions
May 16, 2008	Waived Carla Thomas
May 16, 2008	Temporarily Suspend Yelena Leuchanka due to Overseas Commitments
Mau 28, 2008	Waived Chantelle Anderson
June 22, 2008	Traded Camille Little to the Seattle Storm in exchange for a Second Round Pick in the 2009 WNBA draft
June 23, 2008	Signed Kasha Terry
July 4, 2008	Traded Kristen Mann to the Indiana Fever in exchange for Alison Bales
July 8, 2008	Waived Stacey Lovelace
August 15, 2008	Signed Nikki Teasley
September 12, 2008	Re-Signed Iziane Castro Marques

== Roster ==
2008 Atlanta Dream roster
Players
Coaches

Pos.	No.	Nat.	Name	Height	Weight	From
C	33	(United States)	Bales, Alison	6' 7" (2.01m)	218 lb (99kg)	Duke
G/F	8	(Brazil)	Castro Marques, Iziane	6' 0" (1.83m)	140 lb (64kg)	Brazil
F/C	14	(Brazil)	DeSouza, Erika	6' 5" (1.96m)	190 lb (86kg)	Brazil
C	44	(United States)	Feenstra, Katie	6' 8" (2.03m)	240 lb (109kg)	Liberty
G	4	(United States)	Haynie, Kristin	5' 9" (1.75m)	147 lb (67kg)	Michigan State
F	21	(United States)	Lacy, Jennifer	6' 3" (1.91m)	175 lb (79kg)	Pepperdine
G	12	(United States)	Latta, Ivory	5' 6" (1.68m)	143 lb (65kg)	North Carolina
G	22	(United States)	Lennox, Betty	5' 8" (1.73m)	143 lb (65kg)	Louisiana Tech
G	9	(Sweden)	Nnamaka, Chioma	6' 0" (1.83m)		Georgia Tech
G/F	43	(United States)	Strother, Ann	6' 3" (1.91m)	166 lb (75kg)	Connecticut
G	42	(United States)	Teasley, Nikki	6' 0" (1.83m)	159 lb (72kg)	North Carolina
F/C	35	(United States)	Terry, Kasha	6' 3" (1.91m)	185 lb (84kg)	Georgia Tech
F	23	(United States)	Young, Tamera	6' 2" (1.88m)		James Madison

Head coach
(United States) Marynell Meadors (Middle Tennessee)
Assistant coaches
(United States) Katy Steding (Stanford)
(United States) Fred Williams (Boise State)
(United States) Sue Panek
Athletic trainer
(United States) Kara Dolling
Strength and conditioning coach
(United States) Jackie Ansley (Virginia Tech)

Legend

- (C) Team captain
- (DP) Unsigned draft pick
- (FA) Free agent
- (S) Suspended
- Injured

=== Depth ===
Pos.	Starter	Bench
C	Alison Bales	Katie Feenstra
PF	Érika de Souza	Jennifer Lacy
SF	Iziane Castro Marques	Tamera Young; Ann Strother
SG	Betty Lennox	Kasha Terry; Chioma Nnamaka
PG	Ivory Latta	Kristin Haynie; Nikki Teasley

== Schedule ==
=== Preseason ===
2008 Preseason Schedule
Total: 0–2 (Home: 0–1; Road: 0–1)

Game	Date	Opponent	Score	High points	High rebounds	High assists	Location/Attendance	Record
1	May 3	Los Angeles	L 80-86	Thomas, Young (15)	Young (5)	Ingram (4)	Philips Arena; 7,932	0-1
2	May 11	@ Phoenix	L 84-97	Lennox (21)	Lovelace (6)	Haynie, Lennox (4)	US Airways Center; 1,845	0-2

=== Regular season ===
The Atlanta Dream lost their first game in franchise history, 67-100. Their opponent was the Connecticut Sun; the Sun delivered a 32-8 run that stretched into the second quarter to open a 17-point lead. The lead exploded to 34 points. At the conclusion of the game, the Dream were outrebounded 53-29. For the Dream, Stacey Lovelace had 11 points, five assists and four rebounds.

2008 Regular Season
Total: 4–30 (Home: 1–16; Road: 3–14)
May: 0–4 (Home: 0–2; Road: 0–2)

Game	Date	Opponent	Score	High points	High rebounds	High assists	Location/Attendance	Record
1	May 17	@ Connecticut	67-100	Lennox (17)	Haynie, Lennox (7)	Lovelace (5)	Mohegan Sun Arena; 7,420	0-1
2	May 23	Detroit	76-88	Lennox (21)	de Souza (18)	Latta (3)	Philips Arena; 11,609	0-2
3	May 25	Los Angeles	56-74	Castro Marques (17)	de Souza, Feenstra (6)	Haynie, Latta (4)	Philips Arena; 11,186	0-3
4	May 27	@ Washington	74-80	Lennox (29)	de Souza, Lennox, Little, Lovelace (3)	Latta (6)	Verizon Center; 6,231	0-4

June: 0–11 (Home: 0–6; Road: 0–5)

Game	Date	Opponent	Score	High points	High rebounds	High assists	Location/Attendance	Record
5	June 3	Minnesota	81-85	Lennox (28)	Feenstra (9)	Lennox (8)	Philips Arena; 5,844	0-5
6	June 6	Chicago	72-86	Latta (17)	Little (7)	Latta, Lennox (5)	Philips Arena; 7,418	0-6
7	June 7	@ Chicago	70-91	Lacy (18)	Lacy (10)	Lennox (4)	UIC Pavilion; 3,182	0-7
8	June 11	New York	77-81	Lennox (28)	Lennox (7)	Latta (6)	Philips Arena; 5,936	0-8
9	June 13	Indiana	67-76	Young, Latta (14)	Lacy, Young (5)	Latta (6)	Philips Arena; 8,167	0-9
10	June 16	@ Houston	79-88	Lennox (29)	Lennox (11)	Young (3)	Reliant Arena; 6,139	0-10
11	June 18	San Antonio	66-81	Lovelace (18)	Young (13)	Young (7)	Philips Arena; 6,225	0-11
12	June 20	@ Washington	61-72	Lennox (18)	Lennox (9)	Latta (4)	Verizon Center; 7,448	0-12
13	June 22	Detroit	76-97	Latta (26)	Young (11)	Latta (10)	Philips Arena; 7,865	0-13
14	June 27	@ Connecticut	101-109 (OT)	Lennox (44)	Lennox (9)	Lennox (7)	Mohegan Sun Arena; 7,612	0-14
15	June 29	@ Detroit	92-100	Young (26)	Lennox (8)	Latta (5)	Palace of Auburn Hills; 8,798	0-15

July: 3–9 (Home: 1–5; Road: 2–4)

Game	Date	Opponent	Score	High points	High rebounds	High assists	Location/Attendance	Record
16	July 1	Phoenix	79-97	Lennox (18)	Lovelace, Young (7)	Latta (5)	Philips Arena; 9,795	0-16
17	July 3	Houston	65-72	Lennox (15)	Feenstra (9)	Haynie, Strother (3)	Philips Arena; 7,430	0-17
18	July 5	Chicago	91-84	Lacy, Latta (18)	Young (8)	Haynie (11)	Philips Arena; 8,468	1-17
19	July 9	@ Minnesota	73-67	Lennox (24)	Bales (11)	Haynie (5)	Target Center; 5,893	2-17
20	July 11	@ San Antonio	74-82	Lennox (22)	Bales (9)	Lennox (4)	AT&T Center; 10,943	2-18
21	July 13	@ Chicago	66-79	Feenstra (21)	Feenstra (8)	Feenstra, Haynie, Lennox (2)	UIC Pavilion; 2,907	2-19
22	July 16	@ Indiana	81-77	Castro Marques (24)	Bales (11)	Haynie (7)	Conseco Fieldhouse; 9,303	3-19
23	July 18	@ Sacramento	73-77	Haynie (12)	Feenstra (8)	Haynie (4)	ARCO Arena; 7,236	3-20
24	July 19	@ Phoenix	84-110	Latta (18)	Terry (11)	Latta (3)	US Airways Center; 7,913	3-21
25	July 22	Sacramento	66-79	Terry, Latta (15)	Terry (9)	Haynie (4)	Philips Arena; 10,431	3-22
26	July 25	Washington	75-81	Castro Marques (23)	Bales (7)	Haynie (3)	Philips Arena; 8,279	3-23
27	July 27	New York	76-86	Lennox (18)	de Souza (11)	Latta (5)	Philips Arena; 8,759	3-24

August: 0–2 (Home: 0–1; Road: 0–1)

Game	Date	Opponent	Score	High points	High rebounds	High assists	Location/Attendance	Record
Summer Olympic break
28	August 29	Connecticut	72-98	Lennox (19)	de Souza, Feenstra (6)	Haynie (6)	Philips Arena; 11,442	3-25
29	August 30	@ Indiana	72-87	Lennox (27)	Bales (5)	Haynie (5)	Conseco Fieldhouse; 9,280	3-26

September: 1–4 (Home: 0–2; Road: 1–2)

Game	Date	Opponent	Score	High points	High rebounds	High assists	Location/Attendance	Record
30	September 2	Seattle	69-83	Lennox (25)	de Souza (8)	Latta (4)	Philips Arena; 7,390	3-27
31	September 5	@ New York	71-82	Lennox (28)	Lennox (7)	Castro Marques (4)	Madison Square Garden; 7,039	3-28
32	September 8	Indiana	77-81	Lennox (19)	Bales (9)	Castro Marques (6)	Philips Arena; 7,706	3-29
33	September 11	@ Los Angeles	83-72	Castro Marques (23)	Bales (9)	Latta (10)	Staples Center; 9,060	4-29
34	September 12	@ Seattle	72-77	Young (20)	Feenstra, Haynie, Terry (5)	Latta (4)	KeyArena; 9,686	4-30

== Standings ==
Eastern Conference	W	L	PCT	GB	Home	Road	Conf.
Detroit Shock ^{x}	22	12	.647	–	14–3	8–9	16–4
Connecticut Sun ^{x}	21	13	.618	1.0	13–4	8–9	13–7
New York Liberty ^{x}	19	15	.559	3.0	11–6	8–9	11–9
Indiana Fever ^{x}	17	17	.500	5.0	11–6	6–11	12–8
Chicago Sky ^{o}	12	22	.353	10.0	8–9	4–13	10–10
Washington Mystics ^{o}	10	24	.294	12.0	6–11	4–13	6–14
Atlanta Dream ^{o}	4	30	.118	18.0	1–16	3–14	2–18

== Statistics ==
Legend
GP	Games played	GS	Games started	MPG	Minutes per game	RPG	Rebounds per game
APG	Assists per game	SPG	Steals per game	BPG	Blocks per game	PPG	Points per game
FG%	Field-goal percentage	3P%	3-point field-goal percentage	FT%	Free-throw percentage	TO	Turnovers per game
PF	Fouls per game		Team leader		League leader

=== Regular season ===
Player	GP	GS	MPG	FG%	3P%	FT%	RPG	APG	SPG	BPG	PPG
Betty Lennox	34	33	29.7	41.5	35.8	85.5	4.2	2.4	1.3	0.1	17.5
Ivory Latta	34	31	28.2	36.2	34.4	80.2	2.1	3.6	1.3	0.0	11.4
Erika de Souza	12	8	23.1	58.5	0.0	61.5	6.6	0.7	1.4	1.8	9.3
Iziane Castro Marques	29	20	23.1	35.3	30.9	81.4	2.2	1.8	0.9	0.2	9.3
Tamera Young	33	15	22.6	33.3	32.5	69.1	4.2	1.2	0.9	0.3	7.3
Katie Feenstra	33	4	14.0	53.5	0.0	75.0	3.9	0.3	0.9	0.8	6.7
Stacey Lovelace	15	7	17.2	40.4	41.7	69.2	3.6	1.0	1.1	0.7	6.1
Jennifer Lacy	33	22	18.3	38.9	19.0	67.3	2.7	0.8	0.6	0.2	5.7
Alison Bales	17	9	22.3	40.5	33.3	67.7	6.0	0.6	0.9	1.7	4.8
Camille Little	13	2	17.0	42.0	40.0	59.3	3.1	0.7	0.8	0.5	4.8
Kasha Terry	20	8	13.8	47.4	0.0	60.6	3.2	0.5	0.5	0.6	4.6
Kristen Mann	13	8	17.2	40.9	50.0	100.0	1.5	1.1	0.6	0.3	3.5
Kristin Haynie	33	3	14.7	31.6	31.3	75.0	1.7	2.5	0.9	0.1	2.8
Ann Strother	21	0	7.6	35.3	36.8	66.7	0.6	0.3	0.2	0.1	1.9
Chioma Nnamaka	12	0	7.0	23.1	18.2	66.7	1.0	0.2	0.4	0.0	1.3
