= Kasha (disambiguation) =

Kasha is a foodstuff.

Kasha may also refer to:

== Places ==
- Kasha, Alberta, a locality in Canada
- Kasha, Bukavu, Democratic Republic of the Congo
- Kasha, Iran, a village in Gilan Province, Iran
- Kasha Rud, a village in Iran
- Kasha diza (disambiguation)
- Gasha (Peru), a mountain

== Other uses ==
- Kasha (name)
- Kasha (spider), an Ecuadoran genus of arthropods
- Kasha (Pendragon series), a fictional character
- Kasha (folklore), a cat-like monster in Japanese mythology
- Kasha, an orange feline-like fictional character in the TV series Mysticons
- Kasha, the original Japanese title of the novel All She Was Worth
- Kasha-Katuwe Tent Rocks National Monument, in New Mexico
- Kasha's rule, a principle in the photochemistry of electronically excited molecules

== See also ==
- Kascha (disambiguation)
- Kash (disambiguation)
- Kashi (disambiguation)
- Kacha (disambiguation)
- Kesha (born 1987), American singer, songwriter, and rapper
