= Kasha (name) =

Kasha, Kasza or Kaša may refer to the following people

Given name

- Mrs. Kasha Davis, American drag queen
- Kasha Kelley, American politician
- Kasha Kropinski (born 1991), South African-born film and television actress
- Kasha Nabagesera, Ugandan LGBT rights activist
- Kasha Rae, English musician
- Kasha Rigby, American skier
- Kasha Terry (born 1983), American basketball player

Surname

- Abdul-Hamid Musa Kasha, the first governor of East Darfur
- Al Kasha (1937–2020), American songwriter
- Alexander Kasza (1896–1945), Austro-Hungarian World War I flying ace
- Dániel Kasza (born 1994), Hungarian football player
- Filip Kaša (born 1994), Czech football player
- József Kasza (1945–2016), Serbian politician, economist and banker
- Lawrence Kasha (1933–1990), American theatre producer, director, playwright, and stage manager
- Michael Kasha (1920–2013), American chemist
- Róbert Kasza (born 1986), Hungarian modern pentathlete
