= Kacha =

Kacha or KACHA may refer to:

== Places ==
- Kacha, Sevastopol, an urban-type settlement under the jurisdiction of the city of Sevastopol on the Crimean Peninsula
  - Kacha (air base), a Russian Black Sea Fleet naval airbase
- Kacha, Iran, a village in Gilan Province, Iran
- Kacha, Russia, several rural localities in Russia
- Kāchā, alternative name of Kacha-ye Chahardeh, a village in Gilan Province, Iran

== People ==
- Kacha (sage), a mythological sage in Hinduism
- Kacha (king), c. 4th century king of India, possibly from the Gupta dynasty
- Michael Kácha (1874–1940), Czech anarchist

== Other ==
- Kacha (river), a river in Krasnoyarsk Krai, Russia
- 2760 Kacha, a minor planet (asteroid) located in the main asteroid belt
- Kaurna Aboriginal Community and Heritage Association (KACHA)

== See also ==
- Kasha (disambiguation)
- Kacha Bira, a woreda in the Southern Nations, Nationalities and Peoples' Region of Ethiopia
- Kachera or Kaccha, type of loose undergarments in Sikhism
