= La'Tangela Atkinson =

American basketball player (born 1984)

Personal information
- Born: March 24, 1984 (age 42)
- Listed height: 6 ft 2 in (1.88 m)

Career information
- High school: Lee Central High School (Bishopville, South Carolina)
- College: North Carolina (2002–2006)
- WNBA draft: 2006: 1st round, 9th overall pick
- Drafted by: Indiana Fever

Career history
- 2006: Indiana Fever
- 2007-2008: Sacramento Monarchs
- 2009: Seattle Storm

Career highlights
- ACC All-Defensive Team (2006); ACC Rookie of the Year (2003); ACC All-Freshman Team (2003); McDonald's All-American (2002)
- Stats at Basketball Reference

La'Tangela Chiquita Atkinson (born March 22, 1984) is an American professional women's basketball player in the Women's National Basketball Association (WNBA).

== High school ==
Atkinson played for Lee Central High School in Bishopville, South Carolina, where she was named a WBCA All-American. She participated in the 2002 WBCA High School All-America Game where she scored eight points.

== College ==
Atkinson attended college at the University of North Carolina and graduated in 2006.

== North Carolina statistics ==
Legend
| GP | Games played | GS | Games started | MPG | Minutes per game |
| FG% | Field goal percentage | 3P% | 3-point field goal percentage | FT% | Free throw percentage |
| RPG | Rebounds per game | APG | Assists per game | SPG | Steals per game |
| BPG | Blocks per game | PPG | Points per game | **Bold** | Career high |

| Year | Team | GP | Points | FG% | 3P% | FT% | RPG | APG | SPG | BPG | PPG |
|---|---|---|---|---|---|---|---|---|---|---|---|
| 2002-03 | North Carolina | 34 | **331** | 45.0 | 23.5 | 50.3 | **8.3** | 2.6 | 1.4 | 0.4 | 9.7 |
| 2003-04 | North Carolina | 31 | 306 | 50.0 | **29.4** | **66.7** | 8.1 | 2.9 | 1.5 | 0.3 | **9.9** |
| 2004-05 | North Carolina | 34 | 281 | 46.1 | 24.5 | 63.2 | 7.4 | 2.6 | **2.0** | 0.5 | 8.3 |
| 2005-06 | North Carolina | **35** | 317 | **55.3** | 20.6 | 62.5 | 6.6 | **3.1** | 1.6 | **0.6** | 9.1 |
| Career | North Carolina | 134 | 1235 | 49.0 | 24.6 | 58.4 | 7.6 | 2.8 | 1.6 | 0.5 | 9.2 |

== Professional ==
Following her collegiate career, she was selected as the ninth overall pick in the 2006 WNBA draft by the Indiana Fever.

On March 23, 2007, she was traded to the Sacramento Monarchs in exchange for the Monarchs' second-round pick in the 2008 WNBA draft.

== WNBA career statistics ==
Legend
| GP | Games played | GS | Games started | MPG | Minutes per game | RPG | Rebounds per game |
| APG | Assists per game | SPG | Steals per game | BPG | Blocks per game | PPG | Points per game |
| TO | Turnovers per game | FG% | Field-goal percentage | 3P% | 3-point field-goal percentage | FT% | Free-throw percentage |
| **Bold** | Career best | ° | League leader |

=== Regular season ===
| Year | Team | GP | GS | MPG | FG% | 3P% | FT% | RPG | APG | SPG | BPG | TO | PPG |
|---|---|---|---|---|---|---|---|---|---|---|---|---|---|
| 2006 | Indiana | **33** | 1 | 12.7 | 43.7 | **29.4** | 46.2 | 2.3 | 0.7 | 0.5 | 0.2 | **1.0** | **3.0** |
| 2007 | Sacramento | 28 | 0 | 8.1 | **46.8** | 0.0 | **73.7** | 1.6 | 0.5 | 0.4 | 0.2 | 1.2 | 2.1 |
| 2008 | Sacramento | 5 | 1 | 14.6 | 37.5 | 0.0 | 50.0 | 2.8 | 1.6 | 1.0 | 0.4 | 2.0 | 2.8 |
| 2009 | Seattle | 2 | 1 | **23.0** | 25.0 | 0.0 | 50.0 | **9.0** | **2.5** | 5.0 | **0.5** | 2.0 | 2.5 |
| Career | 4 years, 3 teams | 68 | 3 | 11.2 | 43.0 | 23.8 | 54.7 | 2.2 | 0.7 | 0.6 | 0.2 | 1.2 | 2.6 |

=== Playoffs ===
| Year | Team | GP | GS | MPG | FG% | 3P% | FT% | RPG | APG | SPG | BPG | TO | PPG |
|---|---|---|---|---|---|---|---|---|---|---|---|---|---|
| 2006 | Indiana | 2 | 0 | **14.5** | **22.2** | 0.0 | **50.0** | **8.5** | **1.5** | 0.5 | **1.0** | 1.0 | **3.0** |
| 2007 | Sacramento | 2 | 0 | 3.5 | 0.0 | 0.0 | 0.0 | 0.0 | 0.0 | 0.5 | 0.0 | **0.5** | 0.0 |
| Career | 2 years, 2 teams | 4 | 0 | 9.0 | 18.2 | 0.0 | 50.0 | 4.3 | 0.8 | 0.5 | 0.5 | 0.8 | 1.5 |
