= Qoşadizə =

Qoşadizə or Qoşa Dizə or Goshadiza or Gasha-diza may refer to:

- Qoşadizə, Babek, Azerbaijan
- Qoşadizə, Ordubad, Azerbaijan
