= 2002 McDonald's All-American Girls Game =

2003 McDonald's All-American Girls Game
West	East
94	85
- Date: March 31, 2002
- Venue: Madison Square Garden, New York, New York
- MVP: Ann Strother & Shanna Zolman
- Network: ESPN

McDonald's All-American

The 2002 McDonald's All-American Girls Game was an all-star basketball game that was played at Madison Square Garden in New York. The game's rosters featured the best and most highly recruited high school girls graduating in the class of 2002. The game was the 1st annual version of the McDonald's All-American Game. The 20 players were selected from over 700 nominees by a committee of basketball experts. They were chosen not only for their on-court skills, but for their performances off the court as well.

== Rosters ==
The roster was announced on February 27, 2002.

=== Team East ===
Name	Height	Position	Hometown	High school	College choice
LaTangela Atkinson	6–0	SF	Bishopsville, South Carolina	Lee Central	North Carolina
Seimone Augustus	6–2	SG	Baton Rouge, Louisiana	Capitol	LSU
Mistie Bass	6–3	PF	Janesville, Wisconsin	George S. Parker	Duke
Dawn Chriss	6–2	PF	Hillcrest Heights, Maryland	St. Johns College	Virginia Tech
Kate Dessart-Mager	6–0	SF	Media, Pennsylvania	Cardinal O'Hara (PA)	Villanova
Gillian Goring	6–7	SF	Morvant, Trinidad and Tobago	Waterloo West	UConn
Lindsay Richards	5–9	PF	Barrington, Illinois	Barrington	Iowa
Johanna Solverson	6–3	SF	Lake Zurich, Illinois	Lake Zurich	Iowa
Kasha Terry	6–3	C	Douglasville, Georgia	Douglas County (GA)	Georgia Tech
Nicole Wolff	5–11	SG	Walpole, Massachusetts	Walpole	UConn
Shanna Zolman	5–10	PG	Syracuse, Indiana	Wawasee	Tennessee

=== Team West ===
Name	Height	Position	Hometown	High school	College choice
Nikki Blue	5–7	PG	Bakersfield, California	West (CA)	UCLA
Janice Bright	5–9	SG	Los Angeles, California	Lynwood	Cincinnati State Technical
Wilnett Crockett	6–3	SF	Harbor City, California	Narbonne	UConn
Tye'sha Fluker	6–5	C	Pasadena, California	John Muir	Tennessee
Erin Grant	5–7	PG	Arlington, Texas	Mansfield (TX)	Texas Tech
Alexis Kendrick	5–7	SG	Inglewood, California	St. Bernard	Georgia
Tamika Kursh	6–1	PF	Fort Smith, Arkansas	Ft. Smith Northside	Louisiana Tech
Courtney LaVere	6–3	PF	Ventura, California	Buena (CA)	Notre Dame
Nina Norman	5–7	PG	Houston, Texas	Jersey Village	Texas
Brooke Smith	6–3	C	San Anselmo, California	Marin Catholic	Duke
Ann Strother	6–1	SG	Castle Rock, Colorado	Highlands Ranch	UConn
Ruby Vaden	6–2	C	Osceola, Arkansas	Osceola (AR)	Arkansas
