= Marynell Meadors =

American basketball coach

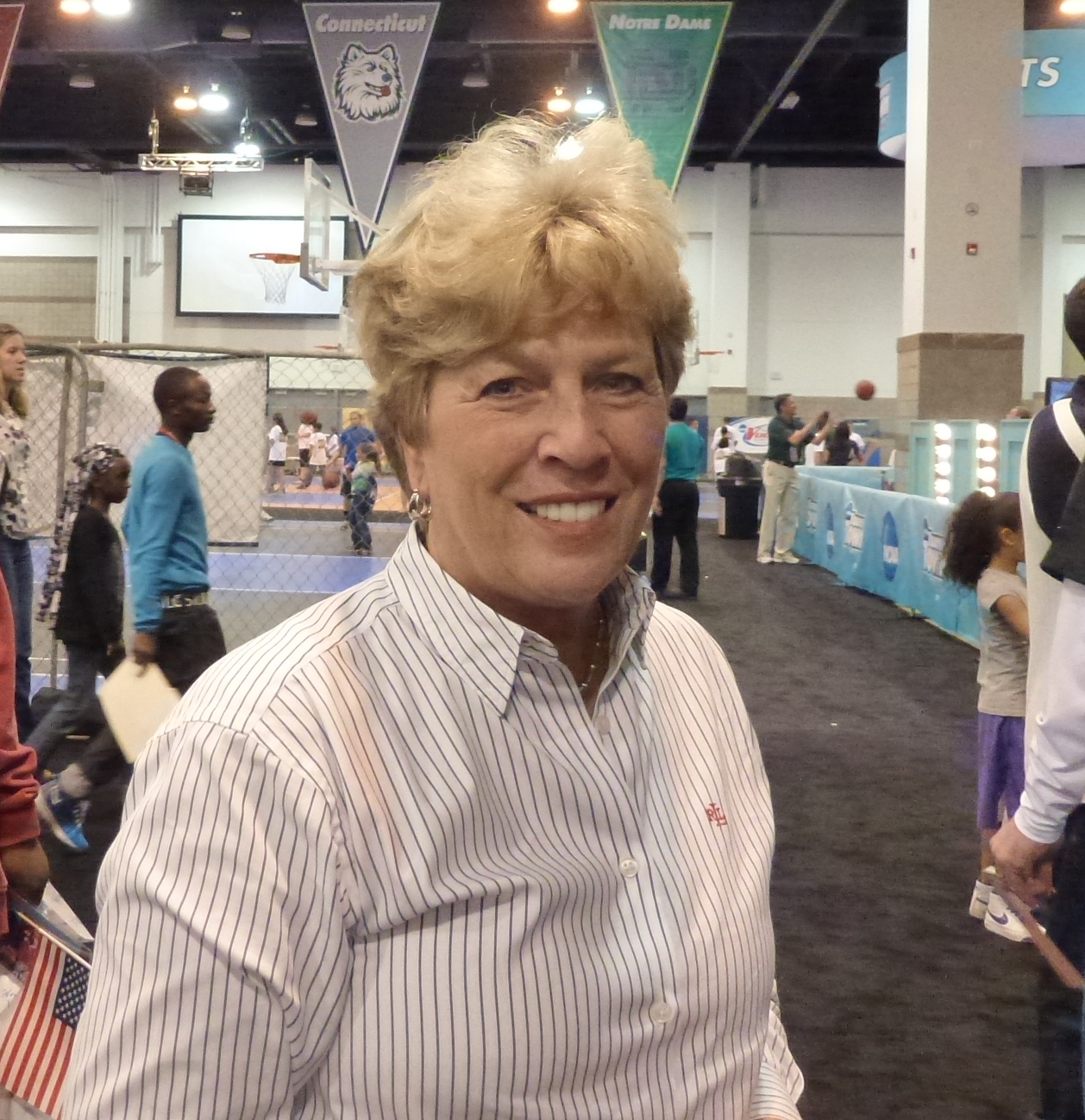
- Meadors in 2012

Personal information
- Born: August 27, 1943 (age 83) Nashville, Tennessee, U.S.

Career information
- College: Middle Tennessee State
- Coaching career: 1970–2012

Career history

Coaching
- 1970–1986: Tennessee Tech
- 1986–1996: Florida State
- 1997–1999: Charlotte Sting
- 2003–2005: Pittsburgh (assistant)
- 2005–2007: Washington Mystics (assistant)
- 2008–2012: Atlanta Dream

Career highlights
- As coach: WNBA Coach of the Year (2009)
Medals
Women's basketball
Assistant coach for United States
Olympic Games
| Gold medal – first place | 2012 London, England | Team competition |
Assistant coach for United States
FIBA World Championship for Women
| Gold medal – first place | 2010 Ostrava and Karlovy Vary, Brazil | Team competition |
Head coach for United States
William Jones Cup
| Bronze medal – third place | 1993 Taipei, Taiwan | Team competition |
Assistant coach for United States
William Jones Cup
| Gold medal – first place | 1992 Taipei, Taiwan | Team competition |

Marynell Meadors (born August 27, 1943) is an American women's basketball coach at the college and professional level. She most recently served as head coach and general manager of the Atlanta Dream of the Women's National Basketball Association and was one of the original eight head coaches when the WNBA started in 1997.

== Biography ==
Meadors grew up in Nashville, Tennessee, and began playing basketball at a young age, shooting at a backboard mounted against a willow tree. According to Meadors, she decided in seventh grade to become a basketball coach. After graduating from Hillsboro High School, she attended Middle Tennessee State University not far from Nashville. She graduated with a B. S. in Physical Education in 1965 and with an M. S. in Physiology of Exercise in 1966.

== College coaching ==
Meadors was allowed by MTSU to begin coaching women's sports, and coached basketball at MTSU before it was a varsity sport and before Title IX was passed. In 1970, women's basketball became a varsity sport. Her total budget (not salary) for her first year was $100.00 She would coach sixteen seasons at Tennessee Tech, finishing with a 363–138 (.724) lifetime record. Meadors would win six consecutive Tennessee state championships, four Ohio Valley Conference championships and two Metro Conference championships.

Looking for opportunities on a larger stage, she coached at Florida State University from 1986 to 1996 where she led the Seminoles to two NCAA tournament appearances and the 1991 Metro Conference Championship. She left Florida State after the 1995–96 season to take over coaching duties of the Charlotte Sting.

Meadors also served as an assistant coach for the Pittsburgh Panthers women's basketball from 2003 to 2005.

== Professional coaching ==
In 1997, Meadors was hired as the head coach and general manager of the Charlotte Sting. It was the first year of the WNBA's existence, and she led the Sting to a 15-13 record, and a spot in the playoffs. In 1998, the Sting finished 18-12, and again were in the WNBA playoffs. However, during a 5–7 start in 1999, Meadors was fired after an 82–56 loss to the Cleveland Rockers.

Between coaching jobs, Meadors would become director of scouting for the Miami Sol in 1999, before the team began play in 2000. She would keep the job until the team folded in 2002. Meadors was then hired as an assistant coach for the Pittsburgh Panthers women's basketball and coach there between 2003 and 2005.

In April 2005, Meadors was hired as an assistant coach by former Washington Mystics head coach Michael Adams. Adams resigned from the Mystics in the same month to join the coaching staff at the University of Maryland, and new Mystics head coach Richie Adubato kept Meadors on the coaching staff. Meadors remained with the Mystics during Adubato's stint with the Mystics, and finished 2007 with Tree Rollins as head coach. (The Mystics went 50–52 while Meadors was on the coaching staff.)

In December 2017, Meadors was hired as Coach of a new addition to the Women's Blue Chip Basketball League, the Atlanta Monarchs.

== Atlanta Dream ==
On November 27, 2007, Marynell Meadors was hired by owner Ron Terwilliger to become the coach of the new, Atlanta Dream WNBA franchise in Atlanta. Meadors presented detailed plans for the new franchise in an interview, and had a master list of WNBA players and college players, with notations as to which players might be protected and which college players might be worth acquiring. "I wouldn't give them the list until they hired me," said Meadors.

With the new team forced to acquire much of its talent from an expansion draft, and with key players being injured or not signing, the Dream endured an 0–17 start to the season and only won four games during their inaugural season.

The next year, the Dream went 18–16, finishing second in the Eastern Conference, and making the playoffs. This tied for the largest win turnaround in WNBA history of 14 game win total from the previous year (Detroit Shock 9 wins in 2002; 25 wins in 2003).

As general manager, Meadors was responsible for convincing veteran Chamique Holdsclaw to return from retirement, drafting rookies Angel McCoughtry (forward) from Louisville and Shalee Lehning (guard) from Kansas State, and getting Michelle Snow and Sancho Little in the supplemental draft from the folding of the Houston Comets.

Meadors was named WNBA Coach of the Year receiving 30 votes, finishing ahead of Lin Dunn of the Indiana Fever who received 6 votes.

In 2010, the Dream went 19–15, finishing fourth in the Eastern Conference, and making the playoffs despite new ownership. Likewise, they lost Snow and Holdsclaw to the San Antonio Silver Stars. In the playoffs, the swept through No. 1 seed Washington and No. 2 seed New York to advance to the WNBA Finals for the first time in their history. Despite the odds, they played three close games with the Seattle Storm which featured Swin Cash, Sue Bird, and Finals MVP Lauren Jackson.

The next year, the Dream went 20–14, finishing third in the Eastern Conference, and making the playoffs despite another ownership change. They added Lindsay Harding from a trade with the Washington Mystics as well as adding players in Courtney Paris and Sandora Irvin. Angel McCoughtry made her first All-Star debut with an outstanding season as well as contributions from Sancho Lyttle, Iziane Castro-Marques and Erika DeSouza. In the playoffs, the swept through No. 2 seed Connecticut and beat No. 1 seed Indiana 2–1 to advance to the WNBA Finals despite losing star player Erika DeSouza to the Brazilian team. In the Finals the Dream were swept again this time by the Minnesota Lynx with MVP Seimone Augustus taking stage. Still, the Dream are the only pro-basketball team in Atlanta to make it to a championship final.

In 2012, with the Dream at 12–12 and some unstated issues related to McCoughtry, Meadors was fired on August 27, 2012.

== USA Basketball ==
Meadors was selected as the assistant coach of the team representing the US in 1992 at the William Jones Cup competition in Taipei, Taiwan. The USA team started out with an eight-point win over Japan, then won their next five with double-digit margins. In their game against Australia, they trailed at halftime, but came back to win by ten points. In their next-to-last game, the USA faced South Korea, who gave the USA the toughest challenge yet, but the USA prevailed 91–84. The final game, for the gold medal, was a rematch against Australia. The score was tied late in the first half, but the USA team finished the half with seven straight point, taking a lead they would not give up. The USA completed the competition with an 8–0 record and won the gold medal. Lisa Leslie, at age 19 was playing in her first Jones cup competition. She was the leading scorer and rebounder on the USA team.

Meadors moved up from assistant to head coach of the team representing the US in 1993 at the William Jones Cup competition in Taipei, Taiwan. The team did not start well, they lost the opening game to Japan, and followed that with a three-point loss to Republic of China - Cathay Life. The USA went on to win the next five contests, including a close 74–72 win against Russia, which propelled them to a medal context. That game was a rematch against Russia, and again the results were close. The USA team won 71–69 to win the bronze medal.

Meadors was named assistant coach of the USA National team in preparation for competition in the 2010 World Championships and 2012 Olympics. Because many team members were still playing in the WNBA until just prior to the event, the team had only one day of practice with the entire team before leaving for Ostrava and Karlovy Vary, Czech Republic. Even with limited practice, the team managed to win their first game against Greece by 26 points. The team continued to dominate with victory margins exceeding 20 points in the first five games. Several players shared scoring honors, with Swin Cash, Angel McCoughtry, Maya Moore, Diana Taurasi, Lindsay Whalen, and Sylvia Fowles all ending as high scorer in the first few games. The sixth game was against undefeated Australia—the USA jumped out to a 24-point lead, but the Australian team cut the lead back to single digits late in the game. The USA prevailed 83–75. The USA won their next two games by over thirty points, then faced the host team, the Czech Republic, in the championship game. The USA team had only a five-point lead at halftime, which was cut to three points, but the Czechs never got closer, and went on to win the championship and gold medal.

== Head coaching record ==
Legend
| Regular season | G | Games coached | W | Games won | L | Games lost | W–L % | Win–loss % |
| Playoffs | PG | Playoff games | PW | Playoff wins | PL | Playoff losses | PW–L % | Playoff win–loss % |

| Team | Year | G | W | L | W–L% | Finish | PG | PW | PL | PW–L% | Result |
|---|---|---|---|---|---|---|---|---|---|---|---|
| Charlotte | 1997 | 28 | 15 | 13 | .536 | 3rd in East | 1 | 0 | 1 | .000 | Lost in WNBA Semifinals |
| Charlotte | 1998 | 30 | 18 | 12 | .600 | 2nd in East | 2 | 0 | 2 | .000 | Lost in WNBA Semifinals |
| Charlotte | 1999 | 12 | 5 | 7 | .417 | (replaced) | — | — | — | — | — |
| Atlanta | 2008 | 34 | 4 | 30 | .118 | 7th in East | — | — | — | — | Missed playoffs |
| Atlanta | 2009 | 34 | 18 | 16 | .529 | 2nd in East | 2 | 0 | 2 | .000 | Lost in Conference semifinals |
| Atlanta | 2010 | 34 | 19 | 15 | .559 | 2nd in East | 7 | 4 | 3 | .571 | Lost in WNBA Finals |
| Atlanta | 2011 | 34 | 20 | 14 | .588 | 3rd in East | 8 | 4 | 4 | .500 | Lost in WNBA Finals |
| Atlanta | 2012 | 24 | 12 | 12 | .500 | (replaced) | — | — | — | — | — |
| Career | | 230 | 111 | 119 | .483 | | 20 | 8 | 12 | .400 | |
