= Tamera Young =

American basketball player and coach (born 1986)

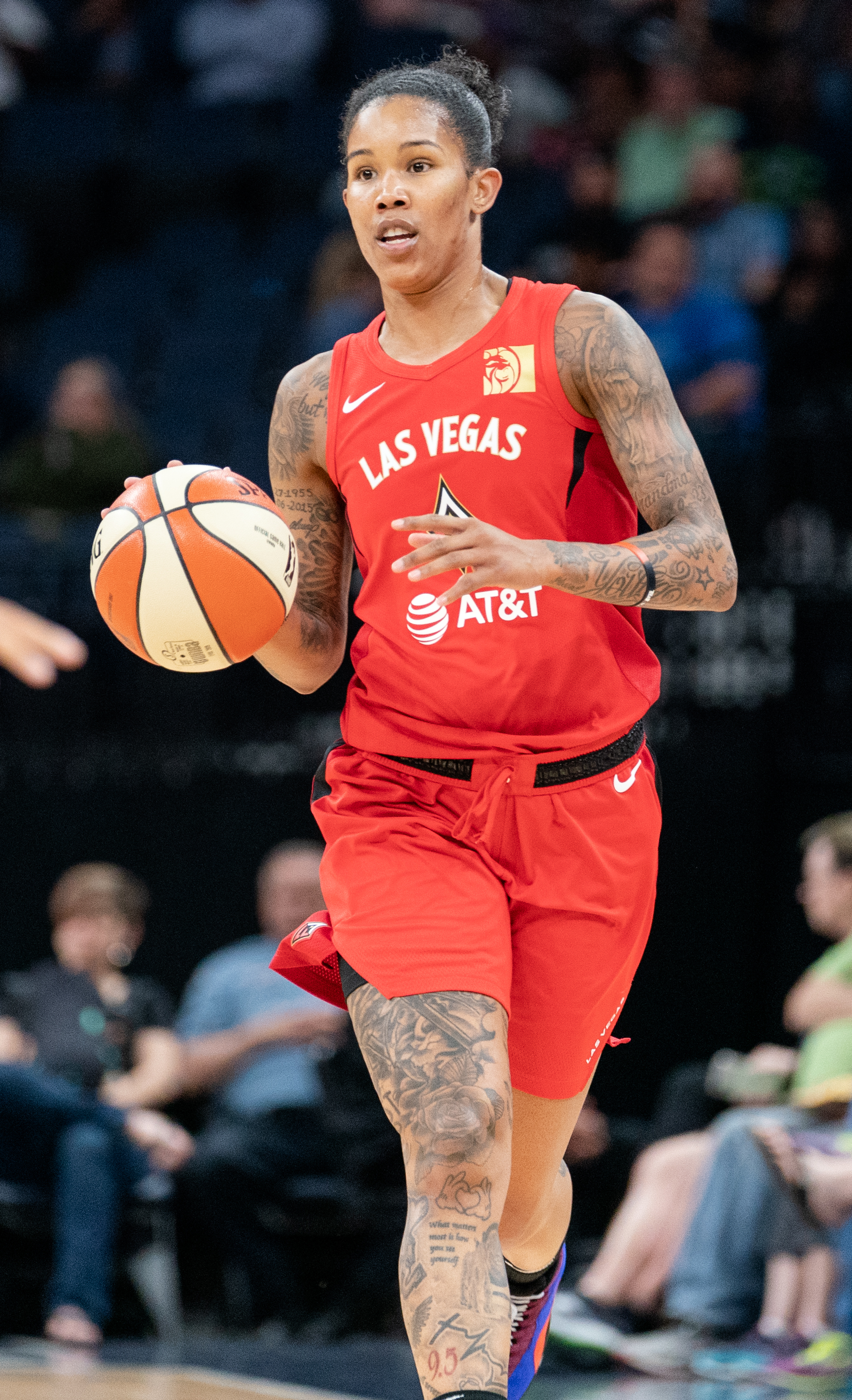
- Young with the Las Vegas Aces in 2018

Personal information
- Born: October 30, 1986 (age 40) Wilmington, North Carolina, U.S.
- Listed height: 6 ft 2 in (1.88 m)
- Listed weight: 175 lb (79 kg)

Career information
- High school: Emsley A. Laney (Wilmington, North Carolina)
- College: James Madison (2004–2008)
- WNBA draft: 2008: 1st round, 8th overall pick
- Drafted by: Atlanta Dream
- Playing career: 2008–present
- Position: Assistant coach

Career history

Playing
- 2008–2009: Atlanta Dream
- 2009–2017: Chicago Sky
- 2016–2017: Shanxi Flame
- 2017: Atlanta Dream
- 2018–2019: Las Vegas Aces

Coaching
- 2024: Chicago Sky (assistant)

Career highlights
- AP honorable mention All-American (2008); CAA Player of the Year (2008); CAA All-Defensive Team (2006); 3× First-team All-CAA (2006–2008); CAA All-Freshman Team (2005)
- Stats at WNBA.com
- Stats at Basketball Reference

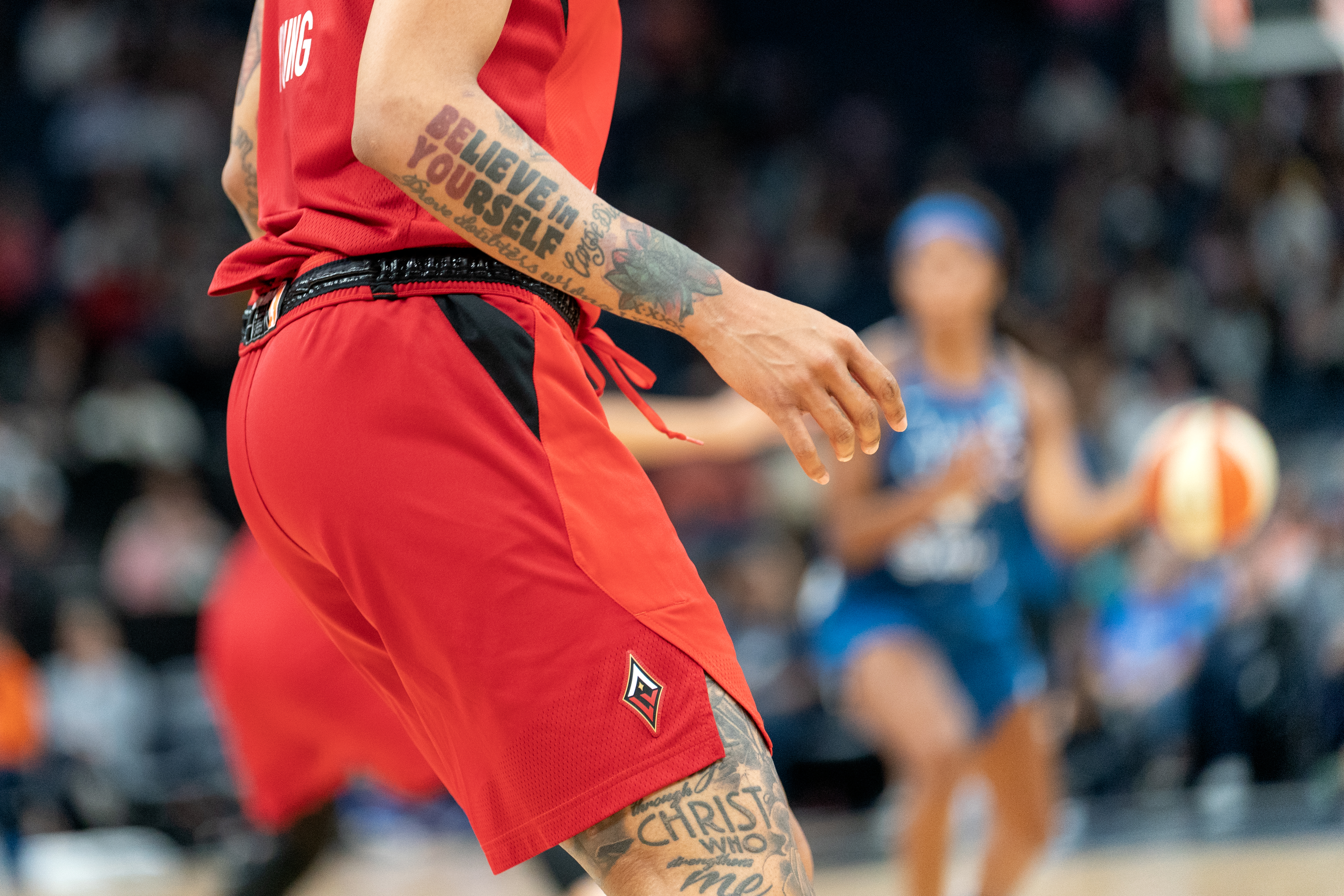
Close-up shot of Young's arm and leg tattoos.

Tamera "Ty" Young (born October 30, 1986) is an American former basketball player and assistant coach with the Chicago Sky. After playing collegiately for James Madison University, Young was drafted by the Atlanta Dream with the 8th overall pick of the 2008 WNBA draft. She was traded to the Chicago Sky, and helped them to the WNBA Finals in 2014, then came back to Atlanta, and was traded to the Aces in 2018.

== Personal ==
Born in Wilmington, North Carolina, Tamera Young is the daughter of the late Greg Young and Lynda Nichols-Brown and John Brown. She has an older brother, A.J., and an older sister, Nikia. Her cousin, Willie Williams, was a cornerback for the National Football League's Pittsburgh Steelers and a 13-year NFL veteran (Steelers 1993–96, 2005; Seattle Seahawks 1997–2003). Tamera is the all-time leading scorer at Emsley A. Laney High School, the same high school that produced Michael Jordan, where her number 11 jersey is retired. During her senior year she led the "Buccaneers to the 2004 Conference Championship. During her off-seasons, she spent her time with her ex-fiancée, Mimi Faust in Atlanta raising awareness about pancreatic cancer to which she lost her father on April 6, 2015.

== College career ==
Tamera played collegiately at James Madison University in the Colonial Athletic Association. She set numerous records while in college, including the conference's all-time scoring record. As a senior, she led JMU to the third round of the 2008 WNIT, before ultimately losing to the University of Kentucky.

== James Madison statistics ==
Legend
GP	Games played	GS	Games started	MPG	Minutes per game
FG%	Field goal percentage	3P%	3-point field goal percentage	FT%	Free throw percentage
RPG	Rebounds per game	APG	Assists per game	SPG	Steals per game
BPG	Blocks per game	PPG	Points per game	**Bold**	Career high

Year	Team	GP	Points	FG%	3P%	FT%	RPG	APG	SPG	BPG	PPG
2004–05	James Madison	29	399	**42.1**	32.4	63.8	7.0	1.5	**2.5**	0.4	13.8
2005–06	James Madison	31	485	39.3	29.2	65.5	9.9	2.5	2.3	0.2	15.6
2006–07	James Madison	33	544	40.2	**33.3**	**74.7**	8.0	2.3	2.1	0.3	16.5
2007–08	James Madison	**34**	**693**	41.0	19.7	65.2	**10.4**	**3.0**	1.9	**0.7**	**20.4**
Career	James Madison	127	2121	40.6	29.7	67.1	8.9	2.4	2.2	0.4	16.7

== WNBA career ==
Young was drafted in the first round with the eighth overall pick in the 2008 WNBA draft by the expansion team Atlanta Dream. In her first season with the Dream Tamera became the first player from James Madison University to play in the WNBA and wore the number 23 on her jersey. In her second season she switched to the number 11, which she wore in college. While playing for the Atlanta Dream, Young's per game averages included 8.9 points, 5.5 rebounds, 1.8 assists, 1.2 steals, and 27.4 minutes a game.

On August 12, 2009, Young was traded to the Chicago Sky in exchange for Armintie Price.

As a player, she averaged 40.5% in field goal accuracy, 27% in three-point accuracy, and averaged 6.8 PPG.

On February 1, 2018, Young signed a contract with the Las Vegas Aces.

== WNBA career statistics ==
Legend
GP	Games played	GS	Games started	MPG	Minutes per game	RPG	Rebounds per game
APG	Assists per game	SPG	Steals per game	BPG	Blocks per game	PPG	Points per game
TO	Turnovers per game	FG%	Field-goal percentage	3P%	3-point field-goal percentage	FT%	Free-throw percentage
**Bold**	Career best	°	League leader

=== Regular season ===
Year	Team	GP	GS	MPG	FG%	3P%	FT%	RPG	APG	SPG	BPG	TO	PPG
2008	Atlanta	33	15	22.6	33.3	32.5	69.1	4.2	1.2	0.9	0.3	1.8	7.3
2009	Atlanta	11	0	6.5	33.3	20.0	64.7	1.3	0.5	0.5	0.1	0.8	2.7
2009	Chicago	10	6	12.9	34.8	25.0	**88.9**	3.0	0.7	0.7	0.4	1.1	5.0
2010	Chicago	32	22	18.6	36.2	27.7	68.4	3.1	1.6	0.8	0.2	1.5	6.8
2011	Chicago	33	19	24.0	42.5	14.3	72.4	3.8	1.3	1.1	0.3	1.9	7.9
2012	Chicago	33	24	24.4	42.3	0.0	60.6	3.7	1.4	1.0	0.2	1.4	8.2
2013	Chicago	33	8	18.1	42.6	0.0	60.5	3.8	0.6	0.5	0.2	**0.7**	5.6
2014	Chicago	**34**	**33**	27.6	43.8	0.0	55.6	**5.1**	1.2	0.7	0.1	0.8	6.7
2015	Chicago	19	10	17.1	39.2	0.0	82.8	2.9	1.3	0.6	0.4	0.9	4.5
2016	Chicago	32	20	25.8	**45.0**	0.0	79.0	4.5	1.4	0.8	0.1	1.1	8.5
2017	Chicago	24	21	**29.0**	36.5	**34.4**	69.0	3.8	2.5	**1.4**	0.4	2.2	**10.2**
2017	Atlanta	11	1	15.5	32.2	33.3	61.5	2.3	0.7	0.3	**0.5**	**0.7**	4.5
2018	Las Vegas	33	25	26.7	40.8	30.8	70.7	**5.1**	**2.8**	1.0	0.2	1.7	9.9
2019	Las Vegas	**34**	4	18.5	38.0	31.3	63.9	3.6	2.0	0.7	0.1	1.4	5.3
Career	12 years, 4 teams	372	208	22.0	39.8	30.0	68.6	3.9	1.5	0.8	0.2	1.3	7.1

=== Playoffs ===
Year	Team	GP	GS	MPG	FG%	3P%	FT%	RPG	APG	SPG	BPG	TO	PPG
2013	Chicago	2	0	16.5	40.0	0.0	**75.0**	1.5	1.0	1.0	0.0	**0.0**	3.5
2014	Chicago	**9**	**9**	**29.8**	43.1	0.0	52.4	4.2	1.4	0.7	**0.4**	1.2	7.4
2015	Chicago	3	2	12.7	25.0	0.0	0.0	3.0	1.7	0.3	0.3	1.7	1.3
2016	Chicago	5	5	27.6	38.3	0.0	50.0	**4.8**	**3.2**	**1.2**	**0.4**	1.8	**9.8**
2019	Las Vegas	5	2	12.4	**57.1**	0.0	50.0	1.2	2.4	0.2	0.2	0.6	5.0
Career	5 years, 2 teams	24	18	22.5	42.1	0.0	54.5	3.3	2.0	0.7	0.3	1.2	6.3

== Overseas career ==
During the 2008–09 off-season, following her rookie year in the WNBA, Young went to Latvia and played for Cesis. For the 2009–10 off-season Young went to Turkey and played for Pankup. In 2010, she signed with Basket Landes in France for the 2010–11 off-season. Young signed to play for Istanbul University in Turkey for the 2011–12 off-season. After the winter holidays she would sign with Maccabi Bnot Ashdod in Israel and go on to win the 2012 Israeli Cup and be named the MVP.

In the 2014 off-season, Young joined the Brazilian championship, being teammate to various Atlanta Dream players in América de Recife.

== Coaching career ==
On April 17, 2024, Young was hired as an assistant coach for the Chicago Sky
