= Kascha =

Kascha may refer to:

- Košice, city in Eastern Slovakia also known as Kascha

== See also ==
- Kasha (disambiguation)
