= Kasha Rud =

Kasha Rud كش رود
- Village
- Location within Iran
- Coordinates: 36°35′40″N 50°05′44″E
- Country: Iran
- Province: Qazvin
- County: Qazvin
- Bakhsh: Alamut-e Gharbi
- Rural District: Dastjerd

Population (2006)
  - Total: 19
- Time zone: UTC+3:30 (IRST)
  - Summer (DST): UTC+4:30 (IRDT)

Kasha Rud (Persian: كش رود, also Romanized as Kashā Rūd and Kashrūd) is a village in Dastjerd Rural District, Alamut-e Gharbi District, Qazvin County, Qazvin Province, Iran. At the 2006 census, its population was 19, in 5 families.
