= Abdul-Hamid Musa Kasha =

Sudanese politician

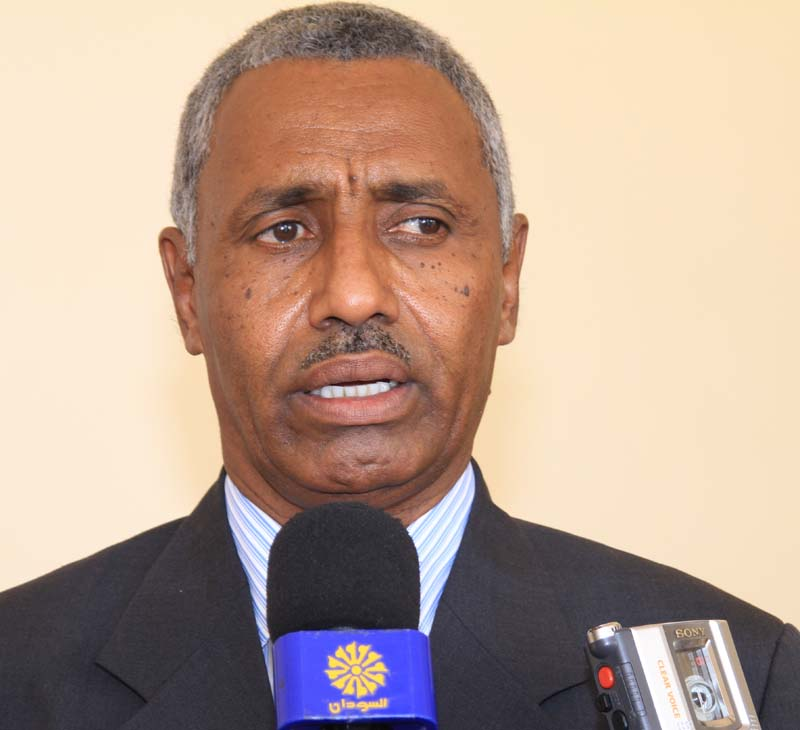

First Governor of East Darfur State
- In office April 2013 – December 2013
- Preceded by: Position established
- Succeeded by: al-Tayeb Abdel-Karim (acting)

Governor of South Darfur State
- In office April 2010 – January 2012
- Succeeded by: Hamad Ismail Hamad Abdel-Karim

Personal details
- Party: National Congress (Sudan)

Abdul-Hamid Musa Kasha is a Sudanese politician who is currently serving as the first governor of East Darfur. He was the governor of the state from April until his resignation in December 2013, when East Darfur split from Southern Darfur. He is also the head of the Wise Men Commission of Darfur for Unity and Reconciliation. He belongs to the Rizeigat tribe, a Muslim and Arab tribe of the nomadic Bedouin Baggāra people in Sudan's Darfur region.

== History ==
Before East Darfur was a state, Kasha was the governor of Southern Darfur (office April 2010). He defeated former Second Vice President of Sudan, Al-Haj Adam Youssef, in the gubernatorial elections for Southern Darfur.
