= 2006 WNBA draft =

2006 meeting of WNBA teams to select players

General information
- Sport: Basketball
- Date: April 5, 2006
- Location: Boston, Massachusetts (main draft)
- Networks: ESPN2, NBATV, ESPNU

Overview
- League: WNBA
- Expansion teams: Chicago Sky
- First selection: Seimone Augustus; Minnesota Lynx

On April 5, 2006, the WNBA Draft took place at the Boston Convention and Exhibition Center. The draft was held in conjunction with the 2006 NCAA women's basketball tournament, which had its championship game the night before at the TD Banknorth Garden, now known as TD Garden, in Boston. This marked the first WNBA draft ever held outside New Jersey.

The first round of the draft was televised on ESPN2, while the second and third rounds were shown on ESPNU and NBA TV. Linda Cohn hosted the draft coverage. Four of the top six draft picks would be named to the All-Star Game in their rookie season: Seimone Augustus, Cappie Pondexter, Sophia Young, and Candice Dupree.

A separate expansion draft for the Chicago Sky took place on November 16, 2005.

== Key ==
!	Denotes player who has been inducted to the Naismith Basketball Hall of Fame
^	Denotes player who has been inducted to the Women's Basketball Hall of Fame
*	Denotes player who has been selected for at least one All-Star Game and All-WNBA Team
^{+}	Denotes player who has been selected for at least one All-Star Game
^{#}	Denotes player who never played in the WNBA regular season or playoffs
**Bold**	Denotes player who won Rookie of the Year

== Draft ==
=== Round 1 ===
Pick	Player	Position	Nationality	Team	School / club team
1	**Seimone Augustus** !	G	United States	Minnesota Lynx	LSU
2	Cappie Pondexter ^	G	United States	Phoenix Mercury	Rutgers
3	Monique Currie	G	United States	Charlotte Sting	Duke
4	Sophia Young *	F	Saint Vincent and the Grenadines	San Antonio Silver Stars	Baylor
5	Lisa Willis	G	United States	Los Angeles Sparks (from Washington)	UCLA
6	Candice Dupree ^{+}	F/C	United States	Chicago Sky	Temple
7	Shona Thorburn	G	Canada	Minnesota Lynx (from Detroit)	Utah
8	Tamara James	G/F	United States	Washington Mystics (from Los Angeles)	Miami (FL)
9	La'Tangela Atkinson	G/F	United States	Indiana Fever	North Carolina
10	Tye'sha Fluker	C	United States	Charlotte Sting (from Houston)	Tennessee
11	Barbara Turner	G	United States	Seattle Storm	Connecticut
12	Sherill Baker	G	United States	New York Liberty	Georgia
13	Kim Smith	F	Canada	Sacramento Monarchs	Utah
14	Scholanda Dorrell	G	United States	Sacramento Monarchs (from Connecticut via San Antonio)	LSU

=== Round 2 ===
Pick	Player	Position	Nationality	Team	School / club team
15	Ann Strother (traded to Phoenix)	G	United States	Houston Comets (from Charlotte)	Connecticut
16	Shanna Zolman	G	United States	San Antonio Silver Stars	Tennessee
17	Ambrosia Anderson (traded to Minnesota)	F	United States	Detroit Shock (from Minnesota)	BYU
18	Liz Shimek (traded to Houston)	F	United States	Phoenix Mercury	Michigan State
19	Nikki Blue	G	United States	Washington Mystics	UCLA
20	Jennifer Harris ^{#}	G	United States	Chicago Sky	Washburn
21	Mistie Williams (traded to Houston)	F	United States	Phoenix Mercury (from Detroit)	Duke
22	Willnett Crockett	F	United States	Los Angeles Sparks	Connecticut
23	Brooke Queenan	F	United States	New York Liberty	Boston College
24	Renae Camino ^{#}	G	Australia	Houston Comets	AIS (Australia)
25	Dalila Eshe ^{#}	F	United States	Seattle Storm	Florida
26	Kasha Terry	F	United States	Indiana Fever	Georgia Tech
27	LaToya Bond	G	United States	Charlotte Sting (from Sacramento)	Missouri
28	Debbie Merrill ^{#}	F	United States	Connecticut Sun	Ohio State

=== Round 3 ===
Pick	Player	Position	Nationality	Team	School / club team
29	Tiffany Stansbury	F/C	United States	Houston Comets	North Carolina State
30	Khara Smith ^{#}	F	United States	San Antonio Silver Stars	DePaul
31	Megan Duffy	G	United States	Minnesota Lynx	Notre Dame
32	Crystal Smith	G	United States	Phoenix Mercury	Iowa
33	Mariam Sy ^{#}	C	United States	Washington Mystics	Oklahoma City
34	Kerri Gardin	F	United States	Chicago Sky	Virginia Tech
35	Zane Teilane	C	Latvia	Detroit Shock	Western Illinois
36	Tiffany Porter-Talbert ^{#}	G	United States	Los Angeles Sparks	Western Kentucky
37	Christelle N'Garsanet	C	Ivory Coast	New York Liberty	Missouri
38	Jessica Foley ^{#}	G	Australia	Indiana Fever (from Houston)	Duke
39	Erin Grant	G	United States	Seattle Storm	Texas Tech
40	Marina Kuzina ^{#}	C	Russia	Indiana Fever	Nadezhda Orenburg (Russia)
41	Lamisha Augustine ^{#}	F	United States	Sacramento Monarchs	San Jose State
42	Marita Payne ^{#}	C	Australia	Connecticut Sun	Auburn

== See also ==
- List of first overall WNBA draft picks
