= Kacha, Russia =

Kacha (Russian: Кача) is the name of several rural localities in Russia:

- Kacha, Krasnoyarsk Krai, a settlement in Zeledeyevsky Selsoviet of Yemelyanovsky District in Krasnoyarsk Krai
- Kacha, Sevastopol, a settlement in Nakhimovsky District of the federal city of Sevastopol
