= Qoşadizə, Ordubad =

Goshadiza
- Municipality
- Azerbaijani: Qoşadizə
- Location within Azerbaijan
- Coordinates: 38°57′13″N 45°50′04″E
- Country: Azerbaijan
- Autonomous republic: Nakhchivan
- District: Ordubad

Population (2005)
  - Total: 469
- Time zone: UTC+4 (AZT)

Qoşadizə (also, Goshadiza, Qoşa Dizə, Goshadize, and Gasha-diza) is a village and municipality in the Ordubad District of Nakhchivan Autonomous Republic, Azerbaijan. It is located 22 km in the north from the district center, on the right bank of the Gilanchay river. Its population is busy with gardening, vegetable-growing, and animal husbandry. There are secondary school, club, library, and a medical center in the village. It has a population of 469.

== Etymology ==
According to researches, the name of the village made out from the Turkic word of qoşa (double, pair, twin) and Persian word of dizə (castle, village, fortification, fence, fortified city) means "double fortress".
