= Morenike Atunrase =

American basketball player (born 1986)

Personal information
- Born: April 14, 1986 (age 40) Shreveport, Louisiana, U.S.
- Listed height: 5 ft 10 in (1.78 m)
- Listed weight: 143 lb (65 kg)

Career information
- High school: Southwood (Shreveport, Louisiana)
- College: Texas A&M (2004–2008)
- WNBA draft: 2008: 2nd round, 24th overall pick
- Drafted by: Atlanta Dream
- Position: Guard / forward

Career history
- 2008: San Antonio Silver Stars

Career highlights
- Big 12 Sixth Player of the Year (2008); First-team All-Big 12 (2006); Big 12 Freshman of the Year (2005)
- Stats at Basketball Reference

Morenike Olayinka Atunrase (born April 14, 1986) is an American basketball player who played for the WNBA's San Antonio Silver Stars during the 2008 season. She was drafted in 2008 out of Texas A&M, where she played from 2004 to 2008.

== Early years ==
Atunrase attended Southwood High School in Shreveport, Louisiana, where she played basketball all four years. As a freshman and sophomore, she was named to the all-state second team. As a junior and senior, she garnered Louisiana's Most Valuable Player honor. She helped her team win the state championship both her sophomore and junior years. As a senior, she was also named Player of the Year by the Shreveport Times. She also picked up honorable mention All-America honors by Street & Smith's. Over her high school career, Atunrase averaged 21 points, 7 rebounds, and 3 assists.

== Texas A&M ==
As a freshman in the 2004–05 season, Atunrase was named Big 12 Rookie of the Week three times, and became the Big 12 Freshman of the Year after the regular season.

As a sophomore, she was Big 12 Player of the Week for one week. She was also named to the All-Big 12 First Team.

In her junior year, she was named to the preseason All-Big 12 team, and became a preseason Naismith Trophy candidate. She also guided the team to their first-ever regular season conference championship.

Atunrase had to get surgery in October 2007 to correct a non-healing stress fracture in her tibia, causing her to miss the first nine games. She received the Big 12 Sixth Man Award her senior season. In the 2008 NCAA Women's Division I Basketball Tournament, she guided the team to their first Elite Eight appearance in program history.

She became the Aggies' all-time leading shot blocker with her 175 blocks.

== Texas A&M statistics ==
Legend
GP	Games played	GS	Games started	MPG	Minutes per game
FG%	Field goal percentage	3P%	3-point field goal percentage	FT%	Free throw percentage
RPG	Rebounds per game	APG	Assists per game	SPG	Steals per game
BPG	Blocks per game	PPG	Points per game	**Bold**	Career high

Year	Team	GP	Points	FG%	3P%	FT%	RPG	APG	SPG	BPG	PPG
2004-05	Texas A&M	31	323	36.8	36.8	71.1	**5.0**	1.2	**2.0**	**1.8**	10.4
2005-06	Texas A&M	**32**	**447**	38.8	**38.8**	70.4	4.1	**2.1**	1.9	1.8	14.0
2006-07	Texas A&M	26	260	35.1	32.9	**77.5**	3.8	2.0	1.5	1.0	10.0
2007-08	Texas A&M	28	287	**39.2**	34.9	73.1	4.3	1.8	1.4	1.1	10.3
Career	Texas A&M	117	1317	37.6	35.8	72.6	4.3	1.8	1.7	1.5	11.3

== Professional career ==
=== WNBA ===
In the 2008 WNBA draft, Atunrase was picked by the Atlanta Dream at No. 24. Immediately following the draft, she was traded to the San Antonio Silver Stars. The Stars also acquired Ann Wauters and a 2009 second round draft pick as part of the trade.

Atunrase became the only rookie or free agent to become a part of the Star's team roster. In her rookie season, she participated in 33 games, averaging 10.5 minutes per game. She scored a season-high of nine points against the Houston Comets on June 24, 2008. In the 2008 WNBA Playoffs, she averaged 1.3 points, 0.9 rebounds, 0.5 assists, 0.1 steals, and 0.1 blocks. Her team ended up losing to the Detroit Shock in the Finals.

The Stars waived Atunrase on May 25, 2009.

=== WNBA career statistics ===
Legend
GP	Games played	GS	Games started	MPG	Minutes per game	RPG	Rebounds per game
APG	Assists per game	SPG	Steals per game	BPG	Blocks per game	PPG	Points per game
TO	Turnovers per game	FG%	Field-goal percentage	3P%	3-point field-goal percentage	FT%	Free-throw percentage
**Bold**	Career best	°	League leader

==== Regular season ====
Year	Team	GP	GS	MPG	FG%	3P%	FT%	RPG	APG	SPG	BPG	TO	PPG
2008	San Antonio	33	0	10.5	27.6	29.3	68.8	1.5	0.7	0.5	0.4	0.8	2.2
Career	1 year, 1 team	33	0	10.5	27.6	29.3	68.8	1.5	0.7	0.5	0.4	0.8	2.2

==== Playoffs ====
Year	Team	GP	GS	MPG	FG%	3P%	FT%	RPG	APG	SPG	BPG	TO	PPG
2008	San Antonio	8	0	5.5	50.0	50.0	0.0	0.9	0.5	0.1	0.1	0.1	1.3
Career	1 year, 1 team	8	0	5.5	50.0	50.0	0.0	0.9	0.5	0.1	0.1	0.1	1.3
