= Ann Strother =

American basketball player (born 1983)

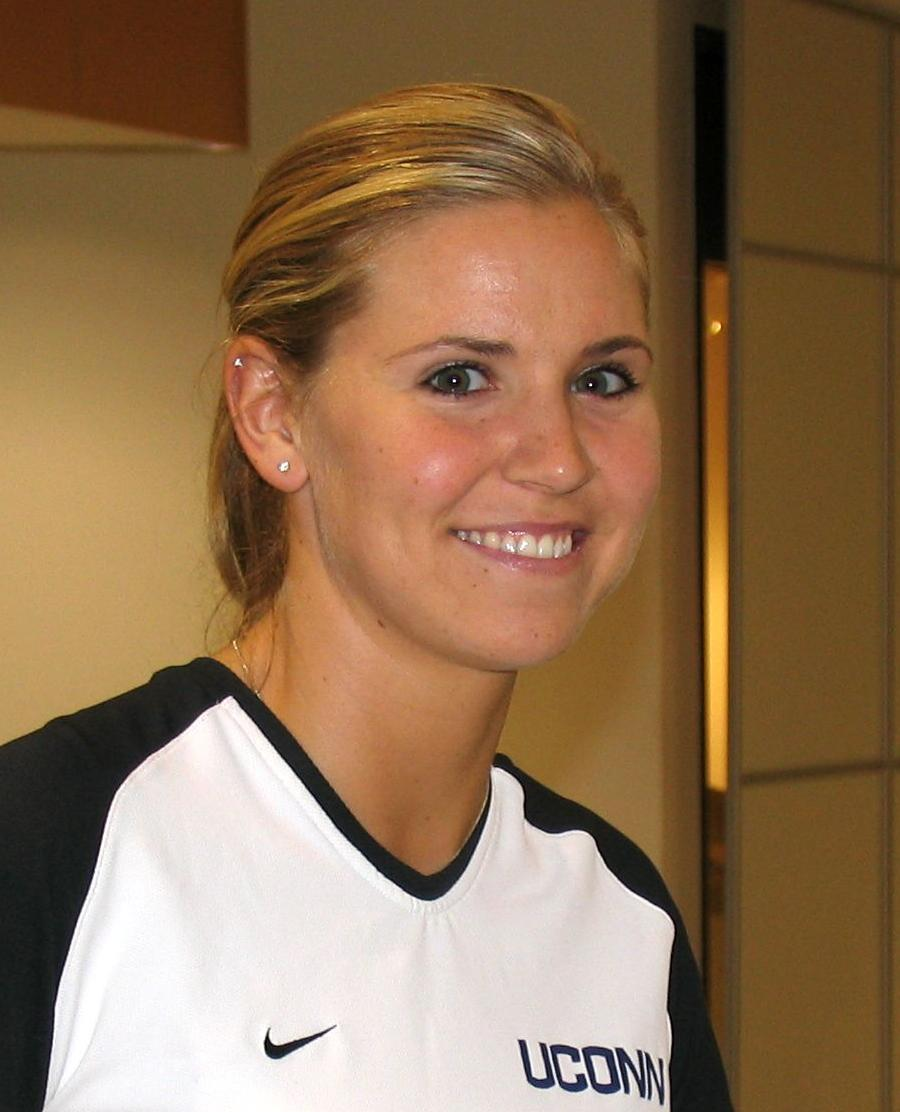
- Strother with UConn

Personal information
- Born: December 11, 1983 (age 42)
- Listed height: 6 ft 3 in (1.91 m)
- Listed weight: 166 lb (75 kg)

Career information
- High school: Heritage (Littleton, Colorado); Highlands Ranch (Highlands Ranch, Colorado)
- College: UConn (2002–2006)
- WNBA draft: 2006: 2nd round, 15th overall pick
- Drafted by: Houston Comets
- Playing career: 2006–2008
- Position: Shooting guard / small forward
- Number: 43, 7, 69

Career history
- 2006: Phoenix Mercury
- 2007: Indiana Fever
- 2008: Atlanta Dream

Career highlights
- 2× NCAA Champion (2003, 2004); 2x First-team All-Big East (2005, 2006); Big East Tournament MOP (2006); Big East All-Freshman Team (2003); Naismith Prep Player of the Year (2002); Gatorade National Player of the Year (2002); McDonald's All-American Game Co-MVP (2002)

Career statistics
- Points: 83 (2.0 ppg)
- Rebounds: 27 (0.7 rpg)
- Assists: 12 (0.3 apg)
- Stats at Basketball Reference
Medals
Women's basketball
Representing the United States
Pan American
Silver medal – second place	2003 Santo Domingo	Team
FIBA Under-19 World Cup
Bronze medal – third place	2001 Czech Republic	Team
Basketball 3x3
FIBA 3x3 World Cup
Gold medal – first place	2012 Greece	Team

Ann Elise Strother (born December 11, 1983) is an American basketball coach, and former professional player, most recently for the Indiana Fever. Strother played at the collegiate level for the Connecticut Huskies, helping the team to two national titles.

== Early life ==
Strother spent her childhood in eastern Iowa. Her family moved to Castle Rock, Colorado when she was in 8th grade. Strother was introduced to basketball by her father Kenneth, who played at the University of Northern Iowa for a semester. She became so good at basketball that she received her first college-recruiting letter from the University of Iowa, when she was only in eighth grade.

== High school ==
She went to Heritage High School for two years then transferred to Highlands Ranch High School where she helped the basketball team to win two Colorado State Championships. Strother was named a WBCA All-American. She participated in the 2002 WBCA High School All-America Game, where she scored nine points. Strother was also named to play in the inaugural (2002) McDonald's All-American Game, where she was named co-MVP. During the summer after her freshman and sophomore years of high school, Strother played for a team that went to Paris for two weeks to play in a tournament. Strother played on an Athletic Amateur Union team and while traveling to tournaments, she used her time wisely visiting schools that would later help her in making her college selection decision. During the summer before her senior year of high school, Strother was selected to play on the USA Junior World Championship Team (now known as U19) in the Czech Republic. Strother was the leading scorer in the win over China, and fifth leading scorer over all, helping the US to a 6–1 record and a bronze medal. Strother became only the second high school player in USA Basketball history to receive the honor of playing for the Junior World Championship Team, the other being Lisa Leslie in 1989. Geno Auriemma coached the USA team that year. After that she decided to commit to UConn. Strother was named the Naismith High School National Player of the Year in her senior year (2002) and was the 2001-02 girls' basketball Gatorade National Player of the Year.

== College ==
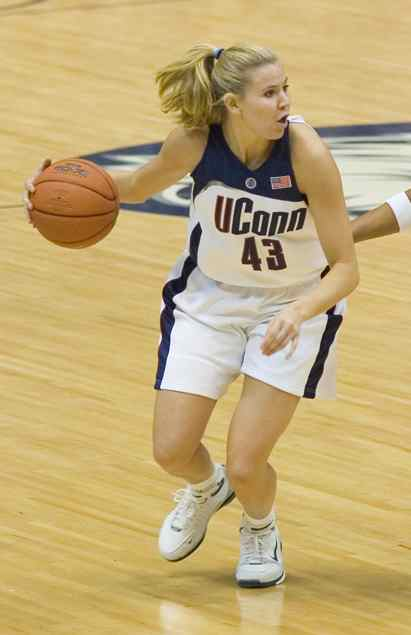
Ann Strother

Strother was recruited by national powerhouses such as the University of Connecticut (UConn), the University of Tennessee, the University of Georgia, Stanford University, Notre Dame University, and Purdue University before ultimately committing to Connecticut. At UConn, Strother would play for future Hall of Fame inductee Geno Auriemma and alongside two-time National Player of the Year Diana Taurasi while helping Connecticut to its fourth and fifth national titles. Strother played in all 143 games of her collegiate career and started in 142. She averaged 12.9 points per game in her career and 14.0 in her senior season despite festering foot problems. Strother would eventually finish seventh all-time among UConn scorers with 1699 career points, and second all-time in career three-point field goals with 290. Strother joined some elite company when she became only the second player in UConn history to amass more than 1600 points, 600 rebounds, 400 assists, 100 steals, and 100 blocks- the other being Diana Taurasi. Strother also excelled in the classroom as she was a Dean's List student all four of her years at UConn. In December 2006, Strother graduated from UConn with a degree in psychology.

While just a freshman, Strother was invited to play on the 2003 Pan American team (along with freshman classmate Barbara Turner. The young team would earn a silver medal, going 5–2, both losses to gold medal winner Cuba. Strother started six of seven games, and averaged 7.9 points per games, fifth best on her team.

== Career statistics ==
=== WNBA career statistics ===
Legend
GP	Games played	GS	Games started	MPG	Minutes per game	RPG	Rebounds per game
APG	Assists per game	SPG	Steals per game	BPG	Blocks per game	PPG	Points per game
TO	Turnovers per game	FG%	Field-goal percentage	3P%	3-point field-goal percentage	FT%	Free-throw percentage
**Bold**	Career best	°	League leader

==== Regular season ====
Year	Team	GP	GS	MPG	FG%	3P%	FT%	RPG	APG	SPG	BPG	TO	PPG
2006	Phoenix	8	0	4.9	**42.9**	40.0	0.0	0.6	0.3	0.1	**0.3**	**0.0**	2.0
2007	Indiana	12	0	5.8	32.3	40.0	**100.0**	**0.8**	0.3	0.0	0.0	0.2	**2.3**
2008	Atlanta	**21**	0	**7.6**	35.3	36.8	66.7	0.6	0.3	**0.2**	0.1	0.1	1.9
Career	3 years, 3 teams	41	0	6.5	35.4	38.6	71.4	0.7	0.3	0.1	0.1	0.1	2.0

==== Playoffs ====
Year	Team	GP	GS	MPG	FG%	3P%	FT%	RPG	APG	SPG	BPG	TO	PPG
2007	Indiana	3	0	5.0	42.9	33.3	0.0	1.0	0.7	0.3	0.0	0.0	2.3
Career	1 year, 1 team	3	0	5.0	42.9	33.3	0.0	1.0	0.7	0.3	0.0	0.0	2.3

=== College career statistics ===
Ann Strother Statistics at University of Connecticut
Year	G	FG	FGA	PCT	3FG	3FGA	PCT	FT	FTA	PCT	REB	AVG	A	TO	B	S	MIN	PTS	AVG
2002–03	38	137	330	0.415	58	156	0.372	52	64	0.813	173	4.6	117	89	26	24	1196	384	10.0
2003–04	35	139	318	0.437	61	161	0.379	45	57	0.789	150	4.3	82	59	27	30	1019	384	11.0
2004–05	33	144	344	0.419	85	218	0.390	54	76	0.711	110	3.3	106	70	32	28	1030	427	12.9
2005–06	37	182	427	0.426	86	235	0.366	54	66	0.818	181	4.9	113	84	35	37	1205	504	13.6
Totals	143	602	1419	0.424	290	770	0.377	205	263	0.779	614	4.3	418	302	120	119	4450	1699	11.9

== Notable performances ==
- March 7, 2006 - scored 20 points in UConn's 50–44 victory over West Virginia to capture the Big East Championship crown; was named the tournament's Most Outstanding Player
- January 7, 2006 - scored a game-high 25 points, including 5 three-pointers, in UConn's 89–80 loss to Tennessee; fouled out for the first time in her career in the final minute, to the delight of Tennessee fans
- December 8, 2006 - had 24 points, 10 rebounds, 5 assists, and three blocks in UConn's 72–56 victory over Villanova
- March 8, 2005 - scored 20 points in UConn's 67–51 victory over Rutgers to win the Big East Championship
- April 6, 2004 - scored 14 points, including 3 critical free throws, to help UConn edge Tennessee 71–60 in the National Championship game
- February 5, 2004 - recorded 17 points and 7 rebounds in UConn's 81–67 defeat of Tennessee
- January 30, 2004 - had a career high 27 points and added 10 rebounds to lead UConn to an 82–49 rout of St. John's, despite Taurasi's absence
- April 8, 2003 - scored 17 points and sank the game-clinching free throws to help UConn defeat Tennessee 73–68 in the National Championship game
- February 1, 2003 - recorded 17 points and 11 rebounds in UConn's 77–65 victory over then top-ranked Duke; this game marks the only time Strother was called for a technical foul: she inadvertently elbowed Duke guard Sheana Mosch
- November 22, 2002 - had 11 points and 11 rebounds in her first collegiate game, helping UConn defeat Wright State 85–39

== Huskies of Honor induction ==
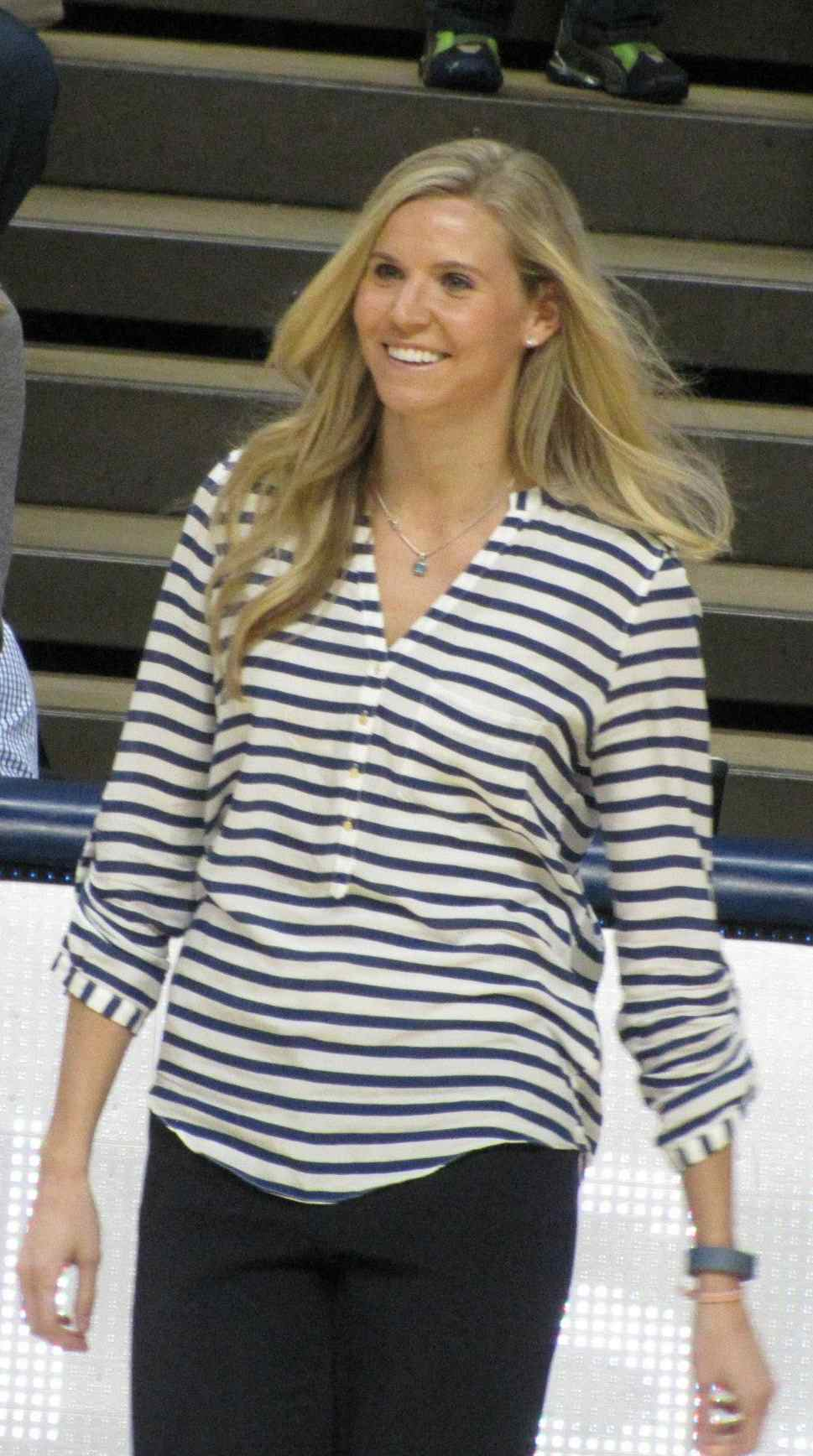
Ann Strother at induction ceremony

On December 29, 2013, the University of Connecticut inducted two women's basketball teams, the National Championship winning squads of 2002–03 and 2003–04 into the Huskies of Honor. Strother was a player for each of those two teams.

== USA Basketball ==
Strother was selected to be on the USA Basketball Women's Junior National team (now known at the U18 and U19 teams). She was the youngest of the invitees at age 17. Strother scored six points per game and helped the US in the bronze medal at the 2001 USA Basketball Women's Junior World Championship held in Brno, Czech Republic.

Strother was named to the team representing the US at the 2003 Pan American Games. The team lost the opening game to Cuba, then rebounded to win their next five games, including an overtime win against Brazil. They then faced Cuba for the gold medal, falling short 75–64 to take home the silver medal. Strother averaged 7.9 points per game.

Strother was also invited to be on the 2012 USA Basketball Women's 3x3 National Team, which will be going to the inaugural FIBA 3x3 World Championship in Athens, Greece, planned for August 2012. The USA team won many of the early games easily. In the 3x3 rules, the game goes for 10 minutes, unless one team reaches 21 or more points. The USA team reached 21 or more points in each of the first seven games. The semi-final and final games were much closer. In the semi-final game, the USA prevailed over Australia 19–18. In the final game against France, the USA team again won by a single point, 17–16, earning the gold medal.

== Professional ==
=== WNBA ===
In the 2006 WNBA draft, Strother was selected by the Houston Comets with the 15th overall pick before being traded to the Phoenix Mercury for Liz Shimek and Mistie Williams. Due to recurring foot pain and a Phoenix bench that was well-stocked with guards, Strother saw very little playing time in her rookie season. Strother played eight games with the Mercury as a rookie before joining the Indiana Fever in an off season trade for veteran center Olympia Scott. On February 6, 2008, Strother was selected by the Atlanta Dream in the expansion draft. She was waived by the Dream on January 14, 2009. During her stints with various WNBA teams, Strother has averaged just 2.0 points per game and 6.5 minutes per game in the WNBA over the course of her career through the end of 2008.

=== International ===
She has also played professionally in Russia, and briefly in Spain.

=== Coaching ===
In October 2007 Strother was hired as the director of basketball operations for the University of Colorado women's basketball team, serving under head coach Kathy McConnell–Miller.

=== Modeling ===
Strother dabbled in a couple of modeling opportunities recently.

== Personal ==
In 2014, Strother married former Yale basketball standout Jason Abromaitis, brother of Notre Dame star Tim Abromaitis.

== See also ==
- 2006 WNBA draft
- 2008 WNBA draft
- List of Connecticut women's basketball players with 1000 points
- 2003–04 Connecticut Huskies women's basketball team
