= Katie Feenstra-Mattera =

American basketball player and coach

Katie Mattera
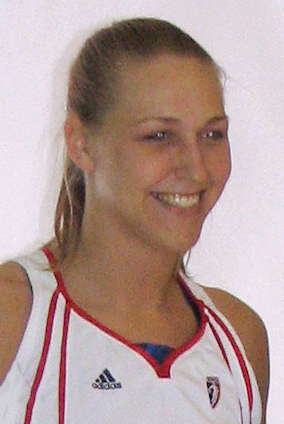

Personal information
- Born: November 17, 1982 (age 43) Grand Rapids, Michigan, U.S.
- Listed height: 6 ft 7.5 in (2.02 m)
- Listed weight: 240 lb (109 kg)

Career information
- High school: Grand Rapids Baptist Academy (Grand Rapids, Michigan)
- College: Liberty (2001–2005)
- WNBA draft: 2005: 1st round, 8th overall pick
- Drafted by: Connecticut Sun
- Playing career: 2005–2009
- Position: Center

Career history
- 2005–2006: San Antonio Silver Stars
- 2007: Detroit Shock
- 2008: Atlanta Dream
- 2009: San Antonio Silver Stars
- 2009: Chicago Sky

Career highlights
- WNBA All-Rookie Team (2005); 3× Big South Player of the Year (2003–2005); 3× First-team All-Big South (2003–2005); Big South All-Freshman Team (2002)
- Stats at WNBA.com
- Stats at Basketball Reference

Katharen Ruth Mattera (née Feenstra; born November 17, 1982) is an American college basketball coach and former player for the Women's National Basketball Association (WNBA).

Mattera is one of the tallest players in WNBA history. At 6 feet 7.5 inches (2.02 m) tall, she is the ninth-tallest person to have played professionally in the WNBA. Only Margo Dydek, at 7 ft 2 in (2.18 m), Han Xu, at 6 ft 11 in (2.11 m), Bernadett Határ, at 6 ft 10.5 in (2.1 m), and Lindsay Taylor, Zheng Haixia, Maria Stepanova, Liz Cambage, and Brittney Griner, each at 6 ft 8 in (2.03 m), are taller than her.

== College career ==
Born in Grand Rapids, Michigan, Mattera went on to star on the women's basketball team while attending Liberty University, where she majored in physical education. She was a three-time Big South Conference Player of the Year, a Wade Trophy, John R. Wooden and Naismith Award nominee. She also became the Big South Conference's all-time shot-blocker on February 14, 2005. Feenstra was the tallest player in Liberty University and Big South Conference history. She finished her career at Liberty as one of only two players in NCAA history to lead the nation in field-goal percentage in back-to-back seasons (2004, 2005)

== Professional career ==
Mattera was originally selected by the Connecticut Sun on April 16, 2005, during the 2005 WNBA draft, but was quickly traded to the San Antonio Silver Stars in exchange for the Silver Stars' player Margo Dydek (the tallest player in the WNBA).

On September 14, 2005, she was named to the WNBA All-Rookie Team.

On February 22, 2007, she was traded to the Detroit Shock in exchange for Ruth Riley.

On February 6, 2008, she was selected in the expansion draft by the Atlanta Dream.

== Coaching career ==
On November 5, 2019, Mattera was named assistant women's basketball coach at Liberty University. Her first head coaching job was at Cornerstone University., where she served for six years.

== Career statistics ==
Legend
GP	Games played	GS	Games started	MPG	Minutes per game	FG%	Field goal percentage
3P%	3-point field goal percentage	FT%	Free throw percentage	RPG	Rebounds per game	APG	Assists per game
SPG	Steals per game	BPG	Blocks per game	TO	Turnovers per game	PPG	Points per game
**Bold**	Career high	*	Led Division I

=== WNBA ===
WNBA regular season statistics
Year	Team	GP	GS	MPG	FG%	3P%	FT%	RPG	APG	SPG	BPG	TO	PPG
2005	San Antonio	**34**	**14**	**19.8**	46.8	—	70.3	5.1	0.2	0.3	**1.3**	1.8	**8.8**
2006	San Antonio	**34**	**14**	18.6	46.7	—	61.9	**6.1**	**0.4**	**0.4**	0.8	2.0	7.8
2007	Detroit	**34**	12	13.1	52.7	—	73.6	4.9	0.2	0.2	0.7	1.2	5.2
2008	Atlanta	33	4	14.0	53.5	—	75.0	3.9	0.3	0.1	0.8	1.8	6.7
2009	San Antonio	13	0	6.1	61.9	—	33.3	1.7	0.1	0.1	0.6	**1.0**	2.2
2009	Chicago	2	0	11.5	**75.0**	—	**83.3**	3.0	0.0	0.0	0.5	3.0	5.5
**Career**	5 years, 4 teams	150	44	15.4	49.7	—	68.9	4.7	0.3	0.2	0.9	1.7	6.7

=== College ===
NCAA statistics
Year	Team	GP	GS	MPG	FG%	3P%	FT%	RPG	APG	SPG	BPG	TO	PPG
2001–02	Liberty	17	—	—	51.0	—	56.1	5.6	0.4	0.2	1.4		10.5
2002–03	Liberty	28	—	23.9	56.9*	0.0	**67.7**	9.1	0.4	0.5	2.4	1.9	15.1
2003–04	Liberty	**32**	—	**28.6**	65.7*	—	57.1	**11.0**	0.5	**0.8**	**2.6**	1.9	**21.1**
2004–05	Liberty	**32**	—	25.9	**67.1***	—	67.3	10.3	**0.9**	0.4	2.5	**1.7**	17.8
**Career**		109	—	26.2	62.2	0.0	62.9	9.5	0.6	0.5	2.3	1.8	16.9

== Personal life ==
Feenstra married Todd Mattera on November 8, 2008. Her sister, Meribeth Anderson, also played basketball at Liberty from 1999 to 2003.

Feenstra wears men's size 17 (US) / 53 (EU) shoes.
