= Jennifer Lacy =

American basketball player (born 1983)

Free Agent
- Position: Forward

Personal information
- Born: March 21, 1983 (age 43) Queens, New York, U.S.
- Listed height: 6 ft 3 in (1.91 m)
- Listed weight: 175 lb (79 kg)

Career information
- High school: Agoura Hills (Agoura Hills, California)
- College: Pepperdine (2001–2005)
- WNBA draft: 2006: undrafted
- Playing career: 2006–present

Career history
- 2006–2007: Phoenix Mercury
- 2008–2009: Atlanta Dream
- 2010–2014: Tulsa Shock
- 2015: Los Angeles Sparks
- 2015: Connecticut Sun

Career highlights
- WNBA champion (2007); All-WCC (2005)
- Stats at WNBA.com
- Stats at Basketball Reference

Jennifer Lee Lacy (born March 21, 1983) is an American professional basketball player.

== Career ==
Lacy graduated from Agoura Hills High School in Agoura Hills, California, in 2002. She played college basketball at Pepperdine, although she was recruited by Arizona, California, UC Santa Barbara, and Washington. She joined the WNBA in 2006. She is 6 feet, 3 inches tall and weighs 175 pounds.

She played for Beijing Shougang in China during the 2008–09 WNBA off-season.

== Personal life ==
Lacy's father, Lee Lacy, is a former Major League Baseball player. She has two brothers, Eric and Michael.

== College statistics ==
Legend
GP	Games played	GS	Games started	MPG	Minutes per game
FG%	Field goal percentage	3P%	3-point field goal percentage	FT%	Free throw percentage
RPG	Rebounds per game	APG	Assists per game	SPG	Steals per game
BPG	Blocks per game	PPG	Points per game	**Bold**	Career high

Year	Team	GP	Points	FG%	3P%	FT%	RPG	APG	SPG	BPG	PPG
2001–02	Pepperdine	20	76	42.9	–	55.2	2.3	0.2	0.4	0.5	3.8
2002–03	Pepperdine	25	118	47.0	–	61.5	3.2	0.2	0.8	0.2	4.7
2003–04	Pepperdine	**30**	265	**51.6**	–	61.4	5.1	0.6	1.0	0.8	8.8
2004–05	Pepperdine	28	**474**	48.9	**14.3**	**68.6**	**8.1**	**0.8**	**1.3**	**0.9**	**16.9**
Career	Pepperdine	103	933	48.9	12.5	64.8	4.9	0.5	0.9	0.6	9.1
