= Ivory Latta =

American basketball player (born 1984)

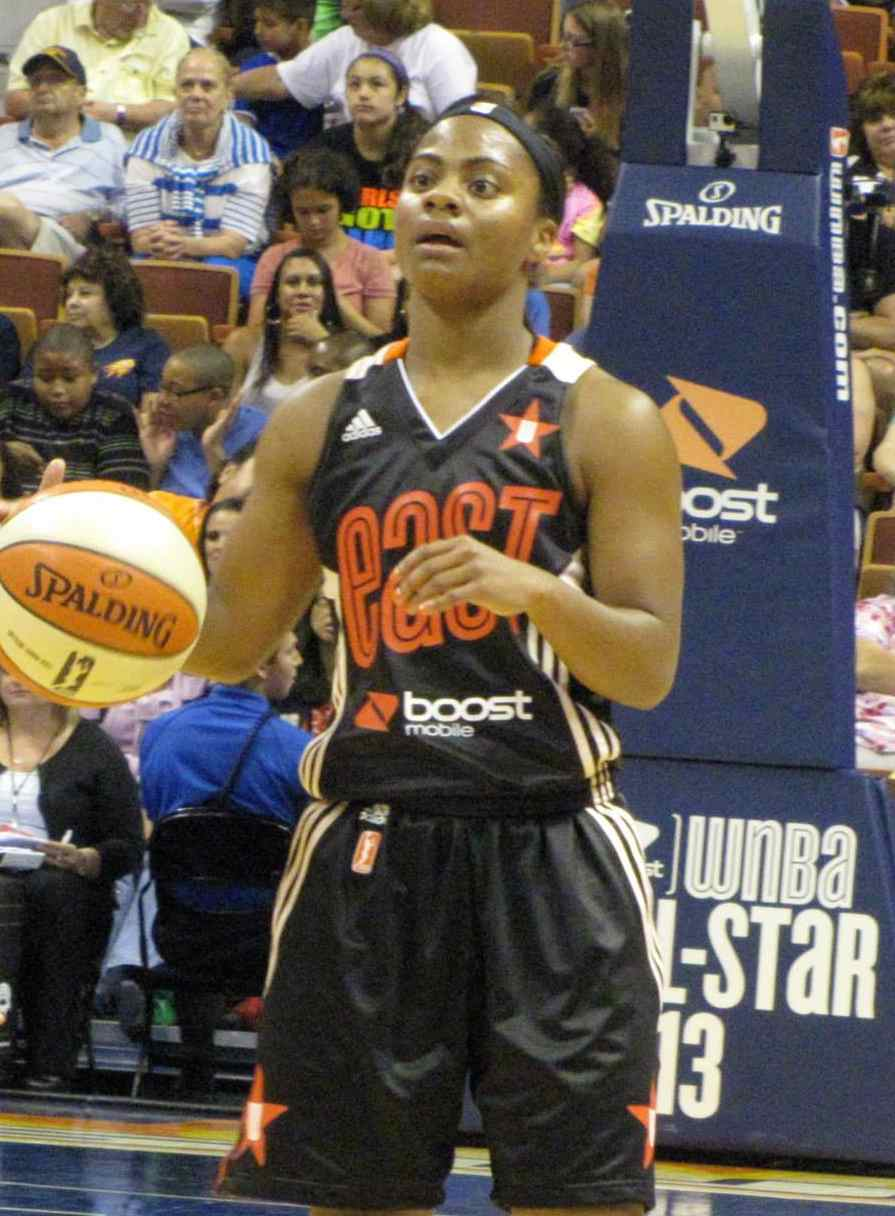

Personal information
- Born: September 25, 1984 (age 42) McConnells, South Carolina, U.S.
- Listed height: 5 ft 6 in (1.68 m)
- Listed weight: 138 lb (63 kg)

Career information
- High school: York Comprehensive (York, South Carolina)
- College: North Carolina (2003–2007)
- WNBA draft: 2007: 1st round, 11th overall pick
- Drafted by: Detroit Shock
- Playing career: 2007–2017
- Position: Point guard
- Number: 12

Career history

Playing
- 2007: Detroit Shock
- 2007–2008: Elitzur Holon
- 2008–2009: Atlanta Dream
- 2008–2009: Ceyhan Belediyesi
- 2009–2010: Mersin BŞB
- 2010–2012: Tulsa Shock
- 2011–2012: Tarsus Belediye
- 2013: Maccabi Ramat Hen
- 2013–2017: Washington Mystics
- 2015–2016: Edirne Belediyesi Edirnespor

Coaching
- 2013–2015: North Carolina (assistant)

Career highlights
- 2× WNBA All-Star (2013, 2014); Dawn Staley Community Leadership Award (2017); USBWA National Player of the Year (2006); Nancy Lieberman Award (2006); 2× All-American – Kodak, USBWA (2006, 2007); 2× First-team All-American – AP (2006, 2007); Third-team All-American – AP (2005); ACC Player of the Year (2006); 3× ACC Tournament MVP (2005–2007); 3× First-team All-ACC (2005–2007); ACC All-Freshman Team (2004); McDonald's All-American (2003); Morgan Wootten National Player of the Year (2003); South Carolina Miss Basketball (2003); No. 12 retired by North Carolina Tar Heels
- Stats at WNBA.com
- Stats at Basketball Reference

Ivory Latta (born September 25, 1984) is an American former professional basketball player. She was drafted 11th overall by the Detroit Shock in the 2007 WNBA Draft. A 5-foot-6-inch (1.68 m) guard noted for her three-point shooting and on-court enthusiasm, she played college basketball for the North Carolina Tar Heels. She is the all-time leading scorer in South Carolina high school basketball history (men's and women's) with a total of 4,319 career points.

== Early life ==
Born in McConnells, South Carolina, Latta played for York Comprehensive High School in York, South Carolina, where she was named a WBCA All-American. She participated in the 2003 WBCA High School All-America Game where she scored seventeen points, and earned MVP honors.

== College career ==
Latta was named the 2006 Player of the Year by ESPN.com, USBWA, GballMag.com and Basketball Times National Player of the Year, Nancy Lieberman Award Winner as Point Guard of the Year (2006), Consensus All-American (2006), ACC Player of the Year (2006), ACC Tournament MVP (2005), WBCA National Player for the Month of March (2005), All-ACC First Team (2007, 2005), AP All-American Third Team (2005), ACC Preseason Rookie of the Year (2004), All-ACC Second Team (2004), All-ACC Freshmen Team (2004). Latta averaged 14.0 points per game as a freshman, 16.2 as a senior, and 16.6 for her career at North Carolina.

== College statistics ==
Legend
GP	Games played	GS	Games started	MPG	Minutes per game
FG%	Field goal percentage	3P%	3-point field goal percentage	FT%	Free throw percentage
RPG	Rebounds per game	APG	Assists per game	SPG	Steals per game
BPG	Blocks per game	PPG	Points per game	**Bold**	Career high

Year	Team	GP	Points	FG%	3P%	FT%	RPG	APG	SPG	BPG	PPG
2003–04	North Carolina	31	433	36.2	34.7	78.0	**2.8**	3.5	1.9	0.1	14.0
2004–05	North Carolina	34	592	42.0	39.7	**86.3**	2.7	4.3	1.7	**0.2**	17.4
2005–06	North Carolina	35	**645**	**45.5**	40.1	85.2	2.1	**5.2**	**2.3**	0.1	**18.4**
2006–07	North Carolina	**38**	615	41.1	**40.2**	85.5	2.1	4.2	1.6	0.1	16.2
Career	North Carolina	138	2285	41.4	38.9	84.0	2.4	4.3	1.9	0.1	16.6

== Professional career ==
Latta was drafted by the Detroit Shock with the 11th pick in the 2007 WNBA draft. She averaged 3.0 points per game as a rookie, and had the second-best 3-point field goal percentage in the WNBA for the 2007 regular season. Latta appeared in her first WNBA Finals during her rookie season with the Shock, where they lost in 5 games to the Phoenix Mercury. On February 6, 2008, Latta was traded to the Atlanta Dream for the Dream's 2008 second round pick and LaToya Thomas. She played for Ceyhan in Turkey during the 2008–09 WNBA off-season. She was originally released by the Atlanta Dream at the start of the 2009 WNBA season, but then signed on July 3, 2009, after the Dream released Nikki Teasley instead.

Latta played for the Tulsa Shock from 2010 to 2012, and joined the Washington Mystics in 2013. In 2013, she was selected to the WNBA All-Star Game for the first time. In 2014, Latta was selected as an all-star replacement for the injured Elena Delle Donne, making it her second all-star game appearance.

In July 2016, Latta suffered a left knee injury during practice at the Verizon Center that would sideline her for the rest of the season after playing 22 games.

In 2017, Latta was healthy and played all 34 games. The Mystics advanced past the second round for the first time in franchise history, but were swept by the Minnesota Lynx in the semi-finals.

== WNBA career statistics ==
Legend
GP	Games played	GS	Games started	MPG	Minutes per game	RPG	Rebounds per game
APG	Assists per game	SPG	Steals per game	BPG	Blocks per game	PPG	Points per game
TO	Turnovers per game	FG%	Field-goal percentage	3P%	3-point field-goal percentage	FT%	Free-throw percentage
**Bold**	Career best	°	League leader

=== Regular season ===
Year	Team	GP	GS	MPG	FG%	3P%	FT%	RPG	APG	SPG	BPG	TO	PPG
2007	Detroit	31	1	7.1	.391	**.449**	.429	0.6	0.6	0.2	0.0	**0.5**	3.0
2008	Atlanta	**34**	31	28.2	.362	.344	.802	2.1	3.6	**1.3**	0.0	1.7	11.4
2009	Atlanta	24	0	14.6	.409	.360	.826	0.7	1.4	0.5	0.0	1.0	6.1
2010	Tulsa	18	16	28.7	.422	.370	.776	1.4	3.9	1.0	**0.1**	2.1	12.4
2011	Tulsa	24	24	28.5	.414	.351	.830	2.0	3.2	1.2	0.0	2.8	12.2
2012	Tulsa	**34**	18	28.3	**.430**	.390	.840	2.2	3.3	0.9	0.0	2.1	**14.3**
2013	Washington	**34**	**34**	31.5	.392	.396	.902	**2.6**	**4.4**	0.8	0.0	1.8	13.9
2014	Washington	**34**	33	**31.7**	.395	.377	.833	2.4	3.3	0.7	0.0	1.9	12.8
2015	Washington	**34**	25	27.3	.406	.389	**.909**	1.8	2.6	0.6	0.0	1.7	13.4
2016	Washington	22	2	20.8	.331	.305	**.909**	1.7	1.9	0.3	0.0	1.4	8.3
2017	Washington	**34**	1	17.0	.349	.328	.871	0.8	1.7	0.4	0.0	0.8	8.0
Career	11 years, 4 teams	323	185	24.2	.393	.369	.848	1.7	2.7	0.8	0.0	1.7	10.7

=== Playoffs ===
Year	Team	GP	GS	MPG	FG%	3P%	FT%	RPG	APG	SPG	BPG	TO	PPG
2007	Detroit	**10**	0	4.7	.263	.333	.667	0.3	0.3	0.2	0.0	**0.2**	1.9
2009	Atlanta	2	2	**37.5**	.400	.333	.889	2.0	2.5	0.5	0.0	1.5	13.5
2013	Washington	3	**3**	31.3	**.484**	.400	.500	**4.0**	3.0	0.6	0.0	2.0	12.7
2014	Washington	2	2	37.1	.357	.333	**1.000**	1.5	**4.5**	0.5	0.0	3.0	**17.0**
2015	Washington	3	**3**	31.5	.400	**.524**	.818	1.3	4.3	**1.0**	0.0	1.3	16.0
2017	Washington	3	0	9.2	.467	.444	.000	0.7	0.7	0.0	0.0	0.3	6.0
Career	6 years, 3 teams	23	10	17.9	.399	.402	.795	1.2	1.8	0.4	0.0	1.0	8.0

=== European career ===
- 2007–2008: (Israel) Elitzur Holon
- 2008–2009: (Turkey) Ceyhan Belediyesi
- 2009–2010: (Turkey) Mersin BŞB
- 2010–2011: (Israel) Maccabi Ramat Hen
- 2011–2012: (Turkey) Tarsus Belediye
- 2013: (Israel) Maccabi Ramat Hen
- 2015–2016: (Turkey) Edirne Belediyesi Edirnespor

== Personal life ==
On January 9, 2003, a resolution was read on the floor of the U.S. House of Representatives by U.S. Representative John Spratt honoring Latta. She would also receive the key to the city of York, South Carolina (where she attended high school and Spratt's hometown), which celebrated Ivory Latta Day on January 10, 2003.

Latta's father and paternal grandmother both live with Parkinson's disease and she has been very outspoken about how her father's diagnosis impacted her. As a result, Latta serves as an ambassador for the Parkinson's Disease Foundation (PDF). In this role, she is involved with fundraising campaigns for PDF and generating awareness about Parkinson's disease, and enlists other professional athletes to support the cause.

Latta's friendships with NBA superstar LeBron James and actor/rapper Chris "Ludacris" Bridges have been well documented.

== Awards and honors ==
- 2006 – Nancy Lieberman Award
