= Chantelle Anderson =

American basketball player-coach (born 1981)

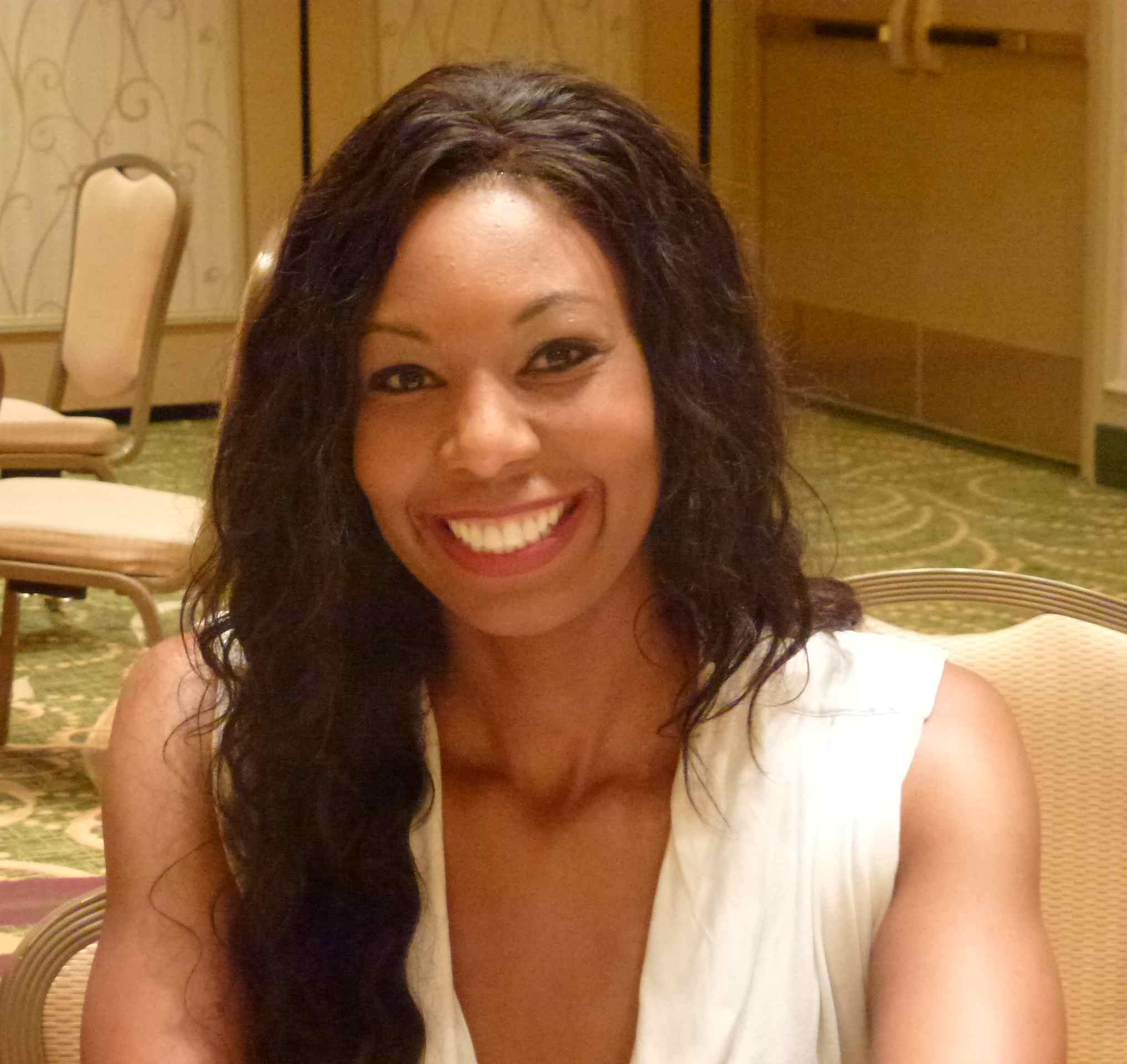
- Anderson at the WBCA Convention in 2013

Personal information
- Born: January 22, 1981 (age 45) Loma Linda, California, U.S.
- Listed height: 6 ft 6 in (1.98 m)
- Listed weight: 192 lb (87 kg)

Career information
- High school: Hudson's Bay (Vancouver, Washington)
- College: Vanderbilt (1999–2003)
- WNBA draft: 2003: 1st round, 2nd overall pick
- Drafted by: Sacramento Monarchs
- Position: Center
- Number: 7

Career history

Playing
- 2003–2004: Sacramento Monarchs
- 2005–2007: San Antonio Silver Stars

Career highlights
- 2× Kodak All-American (2002, 2003); 3× All-American – USBWA (2001–2003); First-team All-American – AP (2002); 2× Second-team All-American – AP (2001, 2003); SEC co-Player of the Year (2002); SEC Tournament MVP (2001); 3× First-team All-SEC (2001–2003); SEC All-Freshman Team (2000); No. 21 retired by Vanderbilt Commodores
- Stats at Basketball Reference
Medals
Women's basketball
| Gold medal – first place | 2000 Taipei | Team Competition |
| Gold medal – first place | 2001 Beijing | Team competition |

Chantelle Denise Anderson (/ʃɔːnˈtɛl/ shawn-TEL; born January 22, 1981) is a Lebanese-American former collegiate and professional basketball player who has played in the Women's National Basketball Association (WNBA) and overseas.

== Personal life ==
Chantelle Anderson was born in Loma Linda, California, to Maxine and Paul Anderson and is the oldest of four sisters.

== College years ==
Anderson graduated from Vanderbilt University in 2003. In her last year she became Vanderbilt's all-time female leading scorer with 2,604 points as well as setting the Vanderbilt's Career Field Goal Percentage mark of 65.1%. She was named to the All-American team in 2001.

Anderson was a member of the Gold Medal-winning USA Basketball Jones Cup Team in 2000 as well as being on the Gold Medal-winning U.S. team at the World University Games in 2001.

- Vanderbilt's 2001 Female Athlete of the Year.
- Named as her team's 2001 co-MVP, along with Trials participant Ashley McElhiney.
- Earned 2001 NCAA Midwest Regional All-Tournament team honors after averaging 24.0 plays per game.
- Named 2001 All-Southeastern Conference (SEC) first team and 2000 All-SEC second team.
- Earned her SEC Tournament MVP honors in 2001.

Anderson was also named to the Vanderbilt Athletics Hall of Fame as part of its inaugural class.

== Career statistics ==
Legend
| GP | Games played | GS | Games started | MPG | Minutes per game | RPG | Rebounds per game |
| APG | Assists per game | SPG | Steals per game | BPG | Blocks per game | PPG | Points per game |
| TO | Turnovers per game | FG% | Field-goal percentage | 3P% | 3-point field-goal percentage | FT% | Free-throw percentage |
| **Bold** | Career best | ° | League leader |

=== WNBA ===
==== Regular season ====
| Year | Team | GP | GS | MPG | FG% | 3P% | FT% | RPG | APG | SPG | BPG | TO | PPG |
|---|---|---|---|---|---|---|---|---|---|---|---|---|---|
| 2003 | Sacramento | 26 | 0 | 6.6 | 43.2 | 0.0 | 33.3 | 0.9 | 0.2 | 0.2 | 0.2 | 0.7 | 1.6 |
| 2004 | Sacramento | 30 | 0 | 7.7 | 39.1 | 0.0 | 73.0 | 1.1 | 0.2 | 0.1 | 0.2 | 0.8 | 2.6 |
| 2005 | San Antonio | **34** | 19 | **19.7** | 46.6 | 0.0 | **80.4** | 2.6 | 0.3 | 0.2 | 0.4 | 1.6 | 6.0 |
| 2006 | San Antonio | 23 | **20** | 18.0 | **52.7** | 0.0 | 77.8 | **3.7** | **0.7** | **0.3** | 0.4 | 1.3 | **6.7** |
| 2007 | San Antonio | 11 | 1 | 7.8 | 50.0 | 0.0 | 66.7 | 1.8 | 0.3 | 0.1 | **0.5** | **0.5** | 2.5 |
| Career | 5 years, 2 teams | 124 | 40 | 12.7 | 46.9 | 0.0 | 73.0 | 2.0 | 0.3 | 0.2 | 0.3 | 1.1 | 4.1 |

==== Playoffs ====
| Year | Team | GP | GS | MPG | FG% | 3P% | FT% | RPG | APG | SPG | BPG | TO | PPG |
|---|---|---|---|---|---|---|---|---|---|---|---|---|---|
| 2003 | Sacramento | **5** | 0 | **5.8** | **60.0** | 0.0 | 50.0 | 0.6 | 0.0 | 0.0 | **0.4** | 0.8 | **1.4** |
| 2004 | Sacramento | 2 | 0 | 5.5 | 50.0 | 0.0 | 0.0 | **1.0** | **0.5** | 0.0 | 0.0 | 0.5 | 1.0 |
| 2007 | San Antonio | 2 | 0 | 2.5 | 0.0 | 0.0 | **100.0** | 0.5 | 0.0 | 0.0 | 0.0 | **0.0** | 1.0 |
| Career | 3 years, 2 teams | 9 | 0 | 5.0 | 50.0 | 0.0 | 75.0 | 0.7 | 0.1 | 0.0 | 0.2 | 0.6 | 1.2 |

=== College ===
Legend
| GP | Games played | GS | Games started | MPG | Minutes per game | FG% | Field goal percentage |
| 3P% | 3-point field goal percentage | FT% | Free throw percentage | RPG | Rebounds per game | APG | Assists per game |
| SPG | Steals per game | BPG | Blocks per game | TO | Turnovers per game | PPG | Points per game |
| **Bold** | Career high | * | Led Division I |

| Year | Team | GP | GS | MPG | FG% | 3P% | FT% | RPG | APG | SPG | BPG | TO | PPG |
|---|---|---|---|---|---|---|---|---|---|---|---|---|---|
| 1999-00 | Vanderbilt | 34 | - | - | 58.9 | 0.0 | 69.3 | 5.6 | 0.7 | 0.7 | 1.3 | - | 15.8 |
| 2000-01 | Vanderbilt | 34 | - | - | **72.3*** | **57.1** | 72.4 | 6.3 | 1.1 | 0.5 | 1.1 | - | **21.2** |
| 2001-02 | Vanderbilt | **37** | - | - | 64.7 | 38.5 | **77.3** | **6.8** | 1.5 | 0.5 | 1.4 | - | 20.7 |
| 2002-03 | Vanderbilt | 32 | - | 28.2 | 63.6 | 0.0 | 75.0 | 5.2 | **1.8** | **1.0** | **1.6** | 3.3 | 18.2 |
| **Career** | | 137 | - | 28.2 | 65.1 | 42.9 | 73.9 | 6.0 | 1.3 | 0.7 | 1.3 | 3.3 | 19.0 |
Statistics retrieved from Sports-Reference.

== WNBA career ==
Anderson was selected 2nd overall by the Sacramento Monarchs in the 2003 WNBA draft. She spent the 2003 and 2004 seasons with the Monarchs as a utility player. During the 2003 season she appeared in 26 games and averaged 1.6 points in 6.5 minutes per game. She scored a than career-high eight points on June 7 when the Monarchs played against the Los Angeles Sparks. She tallied 42 points in her rookie season with the Monarchs.

In the 2004 season she appeared Appeared in 30 games. She scored a then career-high 10 points, twice against New York on July and again at Detroit as well as a career-high seven rebounds in the same game.

During the 2004-05 off-season played for USVO in Valenciennes Cedex

On May 18, 2005, after two seasons in Sacramento, the Monarchs traded Anderson to the San Antonio Silver Stars and would be one of only four Silver Stars players who would see action in all 34 games played that season. She scored a career-high 18 points against the Los Angeles Sparks on July 3, 2006 and a career-high eight rebounds at New York on June 30. Anderson appeared in 20 games before fracturing her patella in her left leg in July 2006. She missed the rest of the season. She then tore her Achilles tendon in January 2007.

On February 6, 2008, Anderson was selected by the Atlanta Dream in the expansion draft, but before the 2008 season began, she suffered a torn ACL. Later on May 28, 2008 Chantelle Anderson was waived by the Atlanta Dream. Anderson was recovering from injury at the time. She was re-signed by the Dream on February 12, 2009, then waived again on May 31. In her WNBA career she played in 90 regular season games.

On October 6, 2009 Anderson announced her retirement from professional basketball.

In 2011, Anderson was honored at a halftime ceremony, including a highlight video of Anderson's career and the retirement of her jersey. At the time, she joined Wendy Scholtens as one of only two women's players to have their jerseys retired, and one of only four basketball players at Vanderbilt to have their jerseys retired, joining men's players Clyde Lee and Perry Wallace.

== International career ==
2003-04: she played for MiZo-Pécsi VSK. She was injured at the halfway point of the season. During the 2004-05 WNBA offseason, Anderson played for USVO in Valenciennes, France, and averaged 9.7 points and 5.4 rebounds per game. Later, Anderson played for the Galatasaray club in Turkey.

She became a naturalized citizen of Lebanon in 2009 and represented their national team in the FIBA Asia Championship for Women.

== After the WNBA ==
Anderson has worked as a color analyst for FSN and appeared on MTV's MADE acting as a coach and advisor.
