= Chioma Nnamaka =

Swedish basketball player (born 1985)

Personal information
- Born: June 15, 1985 (age 41) Uppsala, Sweden
- Listed height: 6 ft 0 in (1.83 m)

Career information
- High school: Fryshusets Kunskaps Centrum
- College: Georgia Tech (2004–2008)
- WNBA draft: 2008: 2nd round, 21st overall pick
- Drafted by: San Antonio Silver Stars

Career history
- 2008: Atlanta Dream
- Stats at Basketball Reference

Chioma Nnamaka (born June 15, 1985 in Uppsala, Sweden) is a Swedish professional female basketball player and a member of Sweden women's national basketball team. Nnamaka is Swedish of Nigerian origin and her parents are Jonathan and Ann-Patrick Nnamaka.

== High school and college ==
Nnamaka attended high school at Fryshusets Kunskaps Centrum. While playing basketball, she helped her team to win the Swedish Championship on three occasions. Nnamaka then went to the United States to attend the Georgia Institute of Technology. She made the Dean's list studying International Affairs, and played basketball for the Georgia Tech Yellow Jackets women's basketball team.

== Georgia Tech statistics ==
Legend
GP	Games played	GS	Games started	MPG	Minutes per game
FG%	Field goal percentage	3P%	3-point field goal percentage	FT%	Free throw percentage
RPG	Rebounds per game	APG	Assists per game	SPG	Steals per game
BPG	Blocks per game	PPG	Points per game	**Bold**	Career high

Year	Team	GP	Points	FG%	3P%	FT%	RPG	APG	SPG	BPG	PPG
2004-05	Georgia Tech	27	344	35.0	33.6	**79.4**	4.6	1.3	1.0	**0.3**	12.7
2005-06	Georgia Tech	29	360	**41.3**	36.5	74.6	**5.2**	1.0	1.1	0.1	12.4
2006-07	Georgia Tech	**33**	429	39.6	36.3	71.4	4.7	**1.5**	1.1	0.2	13.0
2007-08	Georgia Tech	31	**460**	40.9	**38.7**	76.2	3.9	1.3	**1.7**	0.1	**14.8**
Career	Georgia Tech	120	1593	39.2	36.7	76.2	4.6	1.3	1.2	0.2	13.3

== WNBA ==
Nnamaka was selected 21st overall in the 2008 WNBA draft, by the San Antonio Silver Stars via their first pick. She was the highest draft pick ever chosen from Georgia Tech. She was then traded on the same day to the expansion-team Atlanta Dream, where she completed her rookie season. On January 14, 2009 Nnamaka was waived from the roster.

== Honors and activities ==
- Co-Captain of Georgia Institute of Technology Women’s Basketball Team (2006–present)
- All Atlantic Coast Conference Freshman Team (2004)
- Atlantic Coast Conference Rookie of the week (December 2004)
- Most Valuable Player of the Swedish Championship (2003)
