= Kasha Terry =

American basketball player (born 1983)

Personal information
- Born: October 21, 1983 (age 43) Nuremberg, Bavaria, West Germany
- Listed height: 6 ft 3 in (1.91 m)
- Listed weight: 185 lb (84 kg)

Career information
- High school: Douglas County (Douglasville, Georgia)
- College: Georgia Tech (2002–2006)
- WNBA draft: 2006: 2nd round, 26th overall pick
- Drafted by: Indiana Fever
- Position: Center / power forward
- Number: 35

Career history
- 2006–2008: Indiana Fever
- 2008: Atlanta Dream

Career highlights
- McDonald's All-American (2002)
- Stats at Basketball Reference

Kasha NiCarra Terry (born October 21, 1983) is an American professional basketball player in the WNBA. Terry is 6 ft 3 in (1.91 m) tall and weighs 185 lb (84 kg).

== High school ==
Born in Nuremberg, Bavaria, West Germany, Terry played for Douglas County High School in Douglasville, Georgia, where she was named a WBCA All-American. She participated in the 2002 WBCA High School All-America Game where she scored eight points.

== College ==
Terry played college basketball for the Georgia Tech Yellow Jackets.

=== Georgia Tech statistics ===
Legend
GP	Games played	GS	Games started	MPG	Minutes per game
FG%	Field goal percentage	3P%	3-point field goal percentage	FT%	Free throw percentage
RPG	Rebounds per game	APG	Assists per game	SPG	Steals per game
BPG	Blocks per game	PPG	Points per game	**Bold**	Career high

Year	Team	GP	Points	FG%	3P%	FT%	RPG	APG	SPG	BPG	PPG
2002-03	Georgia Tech	**30**	141	40.8%	0.0%	41.2%	4.8	0.6	0.4	1.3	4.7
2003-04	Georgia Tech	28	167	44.1%	0.0%	37.9%	4.6	0.4	0.5	2.5	6.0
2004-05	Georgia Tech	12	78	45.5%	0.0%	**62.1%**	5.8	**0.8**	0.3	2.5	6.5
2005-06	Georgia Tech	29	**200**	**47.8%**	0.0%	46.4%	5.8	0.4	**0.6**	1.9	**6.9**
Career		99	586	44.6%	0.0%	44.6%	5.1	0.5	0.5	2.0	5.9

== Professional ==
She was selected by the Indiana Fever in the second round (26th pick overall) of the 2006 WNBA draft and would play for the team until she was waived by Indiana on May 27, 2008.

On June 23, 2008, Terry was signed by the Atlanta Dream and completed the season with Atlanta until she was waived again on February 4, 2009. During her time with Atlanta she averaged 4.6 points and 3.2 rebounds per game, and started in eight games.

During the 2008-09 WNBA off-season, Terry played for Rybnik in Poland.

In March 2009 she was added to the Seattle Storm training camp roster.
