= 2011 WNBA Finals =

Women's basketball championship series

Team	Coach	Wins
Minnesota Lynx	Cheryl Reeve	3
Atlanta Dream	Marynell Meadors	0
- Dates: October 2 – 7
- MVP: (United States) Seimone Augustus (Minnesota)
- Hall of Famers: Lynx: Maya Moore (2025); Seimone Augustus (2024); Lindsay Whalen (2022)
- Eastern finals: Atlanta defeated Indiana, 2–1
- Western finals: Minnesota defeated Phoenix, 2–0

The 2011 WNBA Finals was the championship series of the 2011 season of the Women's National Basketball Association (WNBA), and the conclusion of the season's playoffs. The Minnesota Lynx, champions of the Western Conference, swept the champions of the Eastern Conference, the Atlanta Dream in three games.

The WNBA Finals was under a 2–2–1 rotation. The Lynx held home-court advantage as they had a better regular season record (27–7) than the Dream (20–14). The 2011 Finals marked the first time the teams met in the championship round. The Lynx made their first ever appearance in the Finals while the Dream were making their second consecutive appearance, after appearing in the 2010 championship series.

Prior to 2011 the Minnesota franchise had not won a playoff series. They had not qualified for the postseason since 2004. Only four players had postseason experience: Rebekkah Brunson, Alexis Hornbuckle, Taj McWilliams-Franklin and Lindsay Whalen. To advance to the Finals, the Lynx defeated Diana Taurasi and the Phoenix Mercury 2–0 in the Western Conference Finals. Atlanta won its second straight Eastern Conference championship by defeating the top-seeded Indiana Fever 2–1 in the Eastern Conference Finals.

This was the first time in WNBA history that both Finals teams were coached by women. Minnesota's Cheryl Reeve had been involved with the WNBA since 2001; she won championships with the Detroit Shock in 2006 and 2008 as an assistant to Bill Laimbeer. This was the second consecutive Finals series to feature the most recent Coach of the Year; Reeve won the award in 2011 (Seattle's Brian Agler won in 2010). Atlanta's Marynell Meadors, the 2009 Coach of the Year, was one of the league's original eight head coaches, leading the Charlotte Sting to a 15–13 record in their inaugural season.

The 2011 WNBA Finals were the first since 2005 to feature two teams that had not previously won a WNBA championship.

The Lynx won the opening game of the series 88–74, using a 13–0 run at the start of the fourth quarter to break open a close game. They then won their second home game 101-95 behind 36 points from Seimone Augustus. Dream forward Angel McCoughtry scored 35 points in Game 1 and 38 in Game 2, matching and surpassing her finals scoring record from 2010.

In Game 3, the Lynx trailed the Dream at halftime again, but shut down the Dream in the third quarter, holding them to eight points and taking a seven-point lead into the fourth quarter. The Dream closed to within one point in the fourth quarter, but never retook the lead; the Lynx won the game 73–67, clinching their first title. It was the first professional sports championship for the state of Minnesota since the Minnesota Twins won the 1991 World Series.

== Background ==
=== 2011 WNBA regular season ===
Eastern Conference	W	L	PCT	GB	Home	Road	Conf.
Indiana Fever ^{x}	21	13	.618	–	13–4	8–9	13–9
Connecticut Sun ^{x}	21	13	.618	–	15–2	6–11	14–8
Atlanta Dream ^{x}	20	14	.588	1.0	11–6	9–8	14–8
New York Liberty ^{x}	19	15	.559	2.0	12-5	7–10	11–11
Chicago Sky ^{o}	14	20	.412	7.0	10–7	4–13	10–12
Washington Mystics ^{o}	6	28	.176	15.0	4–13	2–15	4–18

Western Conference	W	L	PCT	GB	Home	Road	Conf.
Minnesota Lynx ^{x}	27	7	.794	–	14–3	13–4	18–4
Seattle Storm ^{x}	21	13	.618	6.0	15–2	6–11	15–7
Phoenix Mercury ^{x}	19	15	.559	8.0	11–6	8–9	11–11
San Antonio Silver Stars ^{x}	18	16	.529	9.0	9–8	9–8	11–11
Los Angeles Sparks ^{o}	15	19	.441	12.0	10–7	5–12	10–12
Tulsa Shock ^{o}	3	31	.088	24.0	2–15	1–16	1–21

=== 2011 WNBA playoffs ===
Minnesota Lynx		Atlanta Dream
27–7 (.794); 1st West, 1st overall	Seeding	20–14 (.588); 3rd East, 5th overall
Defeated the (4) San Antonio Silver Stars, 2-1	Conference Semifinals	Defeated the (2) Connecticut Sun, 2-0
Defeated the (3) Phoenix Mercury, 2–0	Conference Finals	Defeated the (1) Indiana Fever, 2–1

=== Regular season series ===
The Lynx won the regular season series:

No TV

June 17, 2011

Report

Atlanta Dream 85, Minnesota Lynx 96
Pts: McCoughtry (27); Rebs: de Souza (11); Asts: Castro Marques (4)	Pts: Augustus (25); Rebs: Brunson (14); Asts: Whalen (8)

Target Center, Minneapolis, MN
Attendance: 7,556

FS-N, SSO

June 19, 2011

Report

Minnesota Lynx 77, Atlanta Dream 64
Pts: Augustus (19); Rebs: McWilliams-Franklin (12); Asts: Moore, Whalen (5)	Pts: Harding (14); Rebs: de Souza (12); Asts: Harding, Miller (3)

Philips Arena, Atlanta, GA
Attendance: 7,274

=== Atlanta Dream ===
Again, the Dream advanced to the WNBA Finals for the second straight year by overcoming not having homecourt advantage in the first two rounds of the playoffs. The Atlanta Dream faced adversity early in the season due to Sancho Lyttle's overseas commitments and an injury to Angel McCoughtry. To the advantage of the Dream, the core group of players returned from the team's 2010 run to the Finals. The addition of former first-overall draft pick Lindsey Harding as starting point guard helped the team even further. After starting the season with a dreadful 3–9 record, the Dream caught fire to go 17–5 to finish the season and entered the playoffs with the same momentum. As the No. 3 seed in the Eastern Conference, the Dream eliminated the No. 2 seeded Connecticut Sun in a two-game sweep during the conference playoff semifinals. In the Eastern Conference finals, the Dream went on to eliminate the top-seeded Indiana Fever in three games.

=== Minnesota Lynx ===
Though they had not previously won a playoff series in franchise history, the Minnesota Lynx entered the season with a significant amount of buzz after drafting Maya Moore first overall in the 2011 WNBA draft. The addition of Moore, along with the full recovery of Seimone Augustus from abdominal surgery, was seen as the final piece that could propel the Lynx from perennial also-ran status to a potential playoff run. The Lynx ultimately finished with the best record in the WNBA and in franchise history, finishing the regular season with a 27–7 record. As the No. 1 seed in the Western Conference, the Lynx eliminated the No. 4 seeded San Antonio Silver Stars in three games during the conference playoff semifinals. In the Western Conference finals, the Lynx went on to eliminate the Phoenix Mercury in two games.

== Series summary ==
Game	Date	Home team	Result	Road team
Game 1	October 2	Minnesota Lynx	88–74 (1–0)	Atlanta Dream
Game 2	October 5	Minnesota Lynx	101–95 (2–0)	Atlanta Dream
Game 3	October 7	Atlanta Dream	67–73 (0–3)	Minnesota Lynx

== Game summaries ==
All times are in Eastern Daylight Time (UTC−4).

=== Game 1 ===
ESPN

October 2
8:30pm ET

Recap

Atlanta Dream 74, Minnesota Lynx 88
Scoring by quarter: 18-14, 21-22, 23-26, 13-26
Pts: McCoughtry (33); Rebs: Bales (9); Asts: Harding (5); Stls: McCoughtry (3)	Pts: Brunson (26); Rebs: Brunson (11); Asts: Augustus (7); FG: Brunson (10–15)
Minnesota leads series, 1–0

Target Center, Minneapolis, MN
Attendance: 15,258
Referees:
#55 Eric Brewton
#9 Denise Brooks
#42 Roy Gulbeyan

Rebekkah Brunson had 26 points and 11 rebounds and Seimone Augustus added 22 points to lead the Lynx to an 88–74 victory over the Dream.

Lindsay Whalen added 15 points and six assists and the Lynx turned a close game into a runaway with a 13–0 run to open the fourth quarter. Taj McWilliams-Franklin added eight points and 10 boards while battling an illness.

Angel McCoughtry scored 19 of her 33 points in the third quarter and Lindsey Harding scored 20 points for the Dream.

Atlanta led by 12 points midway through the second quarter and three at halftime. The Lynx evened the score after three quarters at 62 each. With starting center Erika de Souza missing the game while playing for Brazil in an Olympic qualifying tournament, the Dream were outrebounded 40–28 and outscored in the paint 52–30.

The Lynx blocked a WNBA finals record 11 shots and held Atlanta to 37 percent shooting in their first finals game in franchise history.

The crowd of 15,258 was the second-largest in franchise history.

=== Game 2 ===
ESPN2

October 5
8:00 PM ET

Recap

Atlanta Dream 95, Minnesota Lynx 101
Scoring by quarter: 28-22, 30-28, 16-19, 21-32
Pts: McCoughtry (38); Rebs: de Souza (10); Asts: Harding (7); FT: McCoughtry (16–21)	Pts: Augustus (36); Rebs: Augustus (8); Asts: Whalen (4); FG: Augustus (11–14)
Minnesota leads series, 2–0

Target Center, Minneapolis, MN
Attendance: 15,124
Referees:
#4 Sue Blauch
#18 Kurt Walker
#38 Lamont Simpson

Seimone Augustus scored 36 points to lead Minnesota's second-half surge, and the Lynx beat the Atlanta Dream 101–95 in Game 2 of the league championship series.

Jessica Adair added 13 points in 18 minutes in a reserve role for the Lynx, who took a 2–0 lead in the best-of-five matchup by overcoming 38 points by the Dream's Angel McCoughtry, who broke her own finals scoring record of 35, set against the Seattle Storm in 2010.

With veteran center Taj McWilliams-Franklin on the bench with a sprained right knee, WNBA Rookie of the Year Maya Moore sitting for most of the game in foul trouble and fellow All-Star Rebekkah Brunson having a quiet game, Augustus took over.

The Lynx took a 77–76 lead early in the fourth, their first edge since 20–19, and used a 10–0 spurt to turn an 85–81 deficit with five minutes to go into a comfortable lead in the closing minutes.

McCoughtry had 24 points in the first half on 8 for 9 shooting, but she shot just 2 for 13 after halftime. Atlanta criticized the officiating of Sue Blauch, Lamont Simpson and Kurt Walker, noting that the Lynx had received 33 foul calls to 23 for Atlanta.

Iziane Castro Marques was twice fouled while taking a 3-pointer and made only one of those six free-throw attempts. Lindsey Harding had 10 of her 14 points in the first half for the Dream. Erika de Souza finished with eight points and 10 rebounds.

=== Game 3 ===
ESPN2

October 7
8:00pm ET

Recap

Minnesota Lynx 73, Atlanta Dream 67
Scoring by quarter: 17–20, 16–17, 19–8, 21–22
Pts: Augustus (16); Rebs: Brunson (9); Asts: Augustus, McWilliams-Franklin (4); 3PFG: Wiggins (3–6)	Pts: McCoughtry (22); Rebs: de Souza (15); Asts: Harding (7); Stls: Price (5)
Minnesota wins WNBA Finals, 3–0

Philips Arena, Atlanta, GA
Attendance: 11,543
Referees:
#39 Michael Price
#8 Daryl Humphrey
#13 Cameron Inouye

Seimone Augustus and the Minnesota Lynx turned up the defensive pressure on Angel McCoughtry and the Atlanta Dream.

Augustus had 16 points and Maya Moore, returning to her Atlanta home, had 15–including a key 3-pointer late in the game–to lead a balanced scoring attack as the Lynx won their first WNBA title.

McCoughtry had a game-high 22 points, including nine in the fourth quarter. McCoughtry made only 9 of 25 shots as the Dream were held to 34.6 percent shooting from the field.

Erika de Souza, who had 11 points, was Atlanta's only other scorer in double figures.

Minnesota had four scorers in double figures as Rebekkah Brunson had 13 points and nine rebounds and Candice Wiggins had 10 points.

Poor shooting from the field forced Atlanta to foul in the final minute.

Two free throws by Taj McWilliams-Franklin and another by Lindsay Whalen pushed the lead to 67–63. Following a miss by Izi Castro Marques, McWilliams-Franklin added two more free throws with 35 seconds remaining.

McCoughtry had two late layups, but the Dream could come no closer than four points in the final 30 seconds.

Seimone Augustus was named Finals MVP, averaging 24.7 points, 5.7 rebounds, 4.7 assists per game in the series and shooting 58.7% (27–46) from the floor.

== Awards ==
- 2011 WNBA Champions: Minnesota Lynx
- Finals MVP: Seimone Augustus

== Rosters ==
2011 Minnesota Lynx roster
Players
Coaches

Pos.	No.	Nat.	Name	Height	Weight	DOB	From	Yrs
C	1	(United States)	Adair, Jessica	6' 4" (1.93m)	206 lb (93kg)	1986-12-19	George Washington	1
G/F	33	(United States)	Augustus, Seimone	6' 0" (1.83m)	179 lb (81kg)	1984-04-30	LSU	5
F	32	(United States)	Brunson, Rebekkah	6' 2" (1.88m)	175 lb (79kg)	1981-12-11	Georgetown	7
F	6	(United States)	Harris, Amber	6' 5" (1.96m)	215 lb (98kg)	1988-01-16	Xavier	R
G	14	(United States)	Hornbuckle, Alexis	5' 10" (1.78m)	155 lb (70kg)	1985-10-16	Tennessee	3
F	24	(United States)	Houston, Charde	6' 0" (1.83m)	189 lb (86kg)	1986-04-10	Connecticut	3
F/C	8	(United States)	McWilliams-Franklin, Taj	6' 2" (1.88m)	188 lb (85kg)	1970-08-20	St. Edward's	12
F	23	(United States)	Moore, Maya	6' 0" (1.83m)	175 lb (79kg)	1989-06-11	Connecticut	R
G	13	(United States)	Whalen, Lindsay	5' 9" (1.75m)	150 lb (68kg)	1982-05-09	Minnesota	7
G	11	(United States)	Wiggins, Candice	5' 11" (1.8m)	154 lb (70kg)	1987-02-14	Stanford	3
G/F	22	(United States)	Wright, Monica	5' 10" (1.78m)	178 lb (81kg)	1988-07-15	Virginia	1

Head coach
(United States) Cheryl Reeve (La Salle)
Assistant coaches
(United States) Shelley Patterson (Washington State)
(United States) Jim Petersen (Minnesota)
Athletic trainer
(United States) Chuck Barta (UW–La Crosse)
Assistant trainer
(United States) Keith Uzpen (Minnesota State)

Legend

- (C) Team captain
- (DP) Unsigned draft pick
- (FA) Free agent
- (S) Suspended
- Injured

2011 Atlanta Dream roster
Players
Coaches

Pos.	No.	Nat.	Name	Height	Weight	DOB	From	Yrs
C	33	(United States)	Bales, Alison	6' 7" (2.01m)	218 lb (99kg)	1985-04-04	Duke	3
G/F	8	(Brazil)	Castro Marques, Izi	6' 0" (1.83m)	140 lb (64kg)	1982-03-13	Brazil	8
F/C	14	(Brazil)	de Souza, Erika	6' 5" (1.96m)	190 lb (86kg)	1982-03-03	Brazil	5
G	10	(United States)	Harding, Lindsey	5' 8" (1.73m)	139 lb (63kg)	1984-06-12	Duke	4
F	24	(United States)	Irvin, Sandora	6' 3" (1.91m)	185 lb (84kg)	1982-02-23	TCU	5
G	5	(United States)	Lehning, Shalee (injured)	5' 9" (1.75m)	140 lb (64kg)	1986-10-27	Kansas State	2
F	20	(Spain)	Lyttle, Sancho	6' 4" (1.93m)	175 lb (79kg)	1983-09-20	Houston	6
F	35	(United States)	McCoughtry, Angel	6' 1" (1.85m)	160 lb (73kg)	1986-09-10	Louisville	2
G	9	(United States)	Miller, Coco	5' 9" (1.75m)	140 lb (64kg)	1978-09-06	Georgia	10
C	3	(United States)	Paris, Courtney	6' 4" (1.93m)	250 lb (113kg)	1987-09-21	Oklahoma	1
G/F	22	(United States)	Price, Armintie	5' 9" (1.75m)	133 lb (60kg)	1985-04-03	Mississippi	4

Head coach
(United States) Marynell Meadors (Middle Tennessee)
Assistant coaches
(United States) Sue Panek (Maryland)
(United States) Carol Ross (Mississippi)
Player development
(United States) Fred Williams (Boise State)
Athletic trainer
(United States) Kim Mosely (Southern Miss)

Legend

- (C) Team captain
- (DP) Unsigned draft pick
- (FA) Free agent
- (S) Suspended
- Injured
