= 2011 Atlanta Dream season =

- Head coach: Marynell Meadors
- Arena: Philips Arena

Results
- Record: 20–14 (.588)
- Place: 3rd (Eastern)
- Playoff finish: Lost in WNBA Finals

Media
- Television: FS-S, SSO; ESPN2, NBATV

The 2011 Atlanta Dream season was the 4th season for the Atlanta Dream of the Women's National Basketball Association, and their 4th season under head coach, Marynell Meadors. The Dream finished the regular season with a 20-14 record, good for third-best in the Eastern Conference. The Dream then won their second consecutive Eastern Conference Championship. The Dream made their way to the WNBA Finals before being swept by the Minnesota Lynx.

== Transactions ==
=== WNBA draft ===
Round	Pick	Player	Nationality	School/team/country
1	8	Ta'Shia Phillips	United States	Xavier
2	18	Rachel Jarry	Australia	Australia
3	32	Kelsey Bolte	United States	Iowa State

=== Trades and Roster Changes ===
Date	Transaction
January 7, 2011	Extended Qualifying Offers to Alison Bales and Yelena Leuchanka
March 23, 2011	Signed Sandora Irvin to a Training Camp Contract
March 24, 2011	Signed Ashley Paris to a Training Camp Contract
March 31, 2011	Signed Alison Bales to a Training Camp Contract
April 11, 2011	Traded Kelly Miller, the draft rights to Ta'Shia Phillips, and a 1st Round Pick in the 2012 WNBA draft to the Washington Mystics in exchange for Lindsey Harding and a 2nd Round Pick in 2012.
April 11, 2011	Traded the draft rights to Rachel Jarry and a 2nd Round Pick in the 2012 WNBA draft to the Minnesota Lynx in exchange for the draft rights to Felicia Chester
April 21, 2011	Signed Kelsey Bolte to a Rookie Scale Contract
April 28, 2011	Signed Shannon McCallum to a Training Camp Contract
April 29, 2011	Signed Felicia Chester to a Rookie Scale Contract
May 21, 2011	Waived Ashley Paris and Kelsey Bolte
May 31, 2011	Exercised 4th-Year Team Option on Angel McCoughtry
May 31, 2011	Declined Team Option on Shalee Lehning
May 31, 2011	Waived Shannon McCallum
June 1, 2011	Waived Felicia Chester
June 5, 2011	Waived Brittainey Raven
June 5, 2011	Signed Kelly Mazzante
June 16, 2011	Temporarily Suspend Sancho Lyttle due to Overseas Commitments
June 18, 2011	Signed Courtney Paris
July 3, 2011	Activated Sancho Lyttle from her Temporary Suspension
July 3, 2011	Waived Kelly Mazzante
September 8, 2011	Signed Sancho Lyttle to a Contract Extension

== Roster ==
2011 Atlanta Dream roster
Players
Coaches

Pos.	No.	Nat.	Name	Height	Weight	DOB	From	Yrs
C	33	(United States)	Bales, Alison	6' 7" (2.01m)	218 lb (99kg)	1985-04-04	Duke	3
G/F	8	(Brazil)	Castro Marques, Izi	6' 0" (1.83m)	140 lb (64kg)	1982-03-13	Brazil	8
F/C	14	(Brazil)	de Souza, Erika	6' 5" (1.96m)	190 lb (86kg)	1982-03-03	Brazil	5
G	10	(United States)	Harding, Lindsey	5' 8" (1.73m)	139 lb (63kg)	1984-06-12	Duke	4
F	24	(United States)	Irvin, Sandora	6' 3" (1.91m)	185 lb (84kg)	1982-02-23	TCU	5
G	5	(United States)	Lehning, Shalee (injured)	5' 9" (1.75m)	140 lb (64kg)	1986-10-27	Kansas State	2
F	20	(Spain)	Lyttle, Sancho	6' 4" (1.93m)	175 lb (79kg)	1983-09-20	Houston	6
F	35	(United States)	McCoughtry, Angel	6' 1" (1.85m)	160 lb (73kg)	1986-09-10	Louisville	2
G	9	(United States)	Miller, Coco	5' 9" (1.75m)	140 lb (64kg)	1978-09-06	Georgia	10
C	3	(United States)	Paris, Courtney	6' 4" (1.93m)	250 lb (113kg)	1987-09-21	Oklahoma	1
G/F	22	(United States)	Price, Armintie	5' 9" (1.75m)	133 lb (60kg)	1985-04-03	Mississippi	4

Head coach
(United States) Marynell Meadors (Middle Tennessee)
Assistant coaches
(United States) Sue Panek (Maryland)
(United States) Carol Ross (Mississippi)
Player development
(United States) Fred Williams (Boise State)
Athletic trainer
(United States) Kim Mosely (Southern Miss)

Legend

- (C) Team captain
- (DP) Unsigned draft pick
- (FA) Free agent
- (S) Suspended
- Injured

=== Depth ===
Pos.	Starter	Bench
C	Erika de Souza	Courtney Paris
PF	Sancho Lyttle	Alison Bales; Sandora Irvin
SF	Angel McCoughtry
SG	Armintie Price	Iziane Castro Marques
PG	Lindsey Harding	Coco Miller; Shalee Lehning

== Schedule ==
=== Preseason ===
2011 Preseason Schedule
Total: 1–0 (Home: 0–0; Road: 1–0)

Game	Date	Time (ET)	Opponent	TV	Score	High points	High rebounds	High assists	Location/Attendance	Record
1	May 29	12:00pm	@ Great Britain	NBATV	82–51	Miller (21)	Irvin (8)	Harding (5)	Manchester Evening News Arena; N/A	1–0

=== Regular season ===
2011 Regular Season
Total: 20–14 (Home: 13–4; Road: 4–13)
June: 3–7 (Home: 2–5; Road: 1–2)

Game	Date	Time (ET)	Opponent	TV	Score	High points	High rebounds	High assists	Location/Attendance	Record
1	June 5	3:00pm	New York	SSO	88–94 (OT)	Castro Marques (19)	Lyttle (11)	Harding (9)	Philips Arena; 8,038	0–1
2	June 9	7:00pm	Washington	ESPN2	90–98 (OT)	de Souza (20)	de Souza (15)	Castro Marques (5)	Philips Arena; 5,020	0–2
3	June 11	8:00pm	@ San Antonio		74–86	McCoughtry (19)	de Souza (14)	Harding (4)	AT&T Center; 9,140	0–3
4	June 14	7:00pm	@ New York		79–58	McCoughtry (18)	Bales; Irvin (7)	Lehning (6)	Prudential Center; 5,725	1–3
5	June 17	8:00pm	@ Minnesota		85–96	McCoughtry (27)	de Souza (11)	Castro Marques (4)	Target Center; 7,556	1–4
6	June 19	3:00pm	Minnesota	SSO	64–77	Harding (14)	de Souza (12)	Harding; Miller (3)	Philips Arena; 7,274	1–5
7	June 21	12:00pm	Chicago	SSO	71–68	McCoughtry (14)	McCoughtry; Paris (8)	Harding (6)	Philips Arena; 6,154	2–5
8	June 24	7:30pm	Phoenix	FS-S; FS-A	83–92	McCoughtry (24)	Paris (8)	Harding (4)	Philips Arena; 5,492	2–6
9	June 26	3:00pm	San Antonio	NBATV; SSO	86–92	Miller (19)	Paris (11)	Price (5)	Philips Arena; 5,718	2–7
10	June 30	7:30pm	New York	SSO	87–81	de Souza (27)	de Souza (15)	McCoughtry; Miller (4)	Philips Arena; 4,423	3–7

July: 5–3 (Home: 3–0; Road: 2–3)

Game	Date	Time (ET)	Opponent	TV	Score	High points	High rebounds	High assists	Location/Attendance	Record
11	July 9	8:00pm	@ Chicago	CN100	69–81	McCoughtry (17)	McCoughtry (8)	McCoughtry (6)	Allstate Arena; 5,679	3–8
12	July 13	12:00pm	@ New York		69–91	McCoughtry (17)	de Souza (7)	Lehning (3)	Prudential Center; 14,314	3–9
13	July 16	7:30pm	Chicago	NBATV; FS-S; CN100	76–68	McCoughtry (24)	Bales de Souza (8)	Price (10)	Philips Arena; 7,413	4–9
14	July 19	12:00pm	Indiana	NBATV; SSO	84–74	Harding (19)	de Souza (11)	Harding (5)	Philips Arena; 7,645	5–9
15	July 20	11:30am	@ Washington	NBATV	86–79	McCoughtry (33)	Irvin (11)	McCoughtry; Price (3)	Verizon Center; 13,954	6–9
All-Star break
16	July 26	8:00pm	@ Tulsa		76–68	McCoughtry (37)	Bales (9)	Harding; Lehning (3)	BOK Center; 3,435	7–9
17	July 28	7:00pm	Los Angeles	NBATV; SSO	89–80	McCoughtry (22)	McCoughtry (11)	McCoughtry (7)	Philips Arena; 6,701	8–9
18	July 31	5:00pm	@ Connecticut		92–99	McCoughtry (36)	de Souza (9)	Castro Marques (6)	Mohegan Sun Arena; 6,955	8–10

August: 8–3 (Home: 3–1; Road: 5–2)

Game	Date	Time (ET)	Opponent	TV	Score	High points	High rebounds	High assists	Location/Attendance	Record
19	August 2	7:30pm	New York	FS-S	75–85	McCoughtry (24)	McCoughtry; Price (6)	Harding (9)	Philips Arena; 4,573	8–11
20	August 7	3:00pm	Seattle	NBATV; SSO	70–53	McCoughtry (17)	de Souza; Lyttle (7)	Harding (7)	Philips Arena; 7,337	9–11
21	August 9	7:00pm	@ Washington	CSN-MA	72–70	McCoughtry (19)	de Souza (12)	McCoughtry (5)	Verizon Center; 9,536	10–11
22	August 11	10:00pm	@ Phoenix		95–109	McCoughtry (25)	de Souza (7)	Bales (4)	US Airways Center; 7,940	10–12
23	August 13	10:00pm	@ Seattle	NBATV; KONG	92–63	Castro Marques; McCoughtry (17)	McCoughtry (6)	Price (4)	KeyArena; 9,686	11–12
24	August 16	10:30pm	@ Los Angeles	NBATV; SSO; PRIME	84–79	McCoughtry (23)	de Souza (13)	Price (8)	STAPLES Center; 7,522	12–12
25	August 19	7:30pm	Connecticut	NBATV; SSO	94–88 (OT)	McCoughtry (26)	McCoughtry (12)	Harding (5)	Philips Arena; 7,225	13–12
26	August 21	5:00pm	@ Connecticut		87–96	McCoughtry (22)	de Souza (10)	Harding (9)	Mohegan Sun Arena; 6,636	13–13
27	August 23	8:00pm	@ Chicago	CN100	83–80	McCoughtry (22)	McCoughtry (7)	Harding (9)	Allstate Arena; 2,876	14–13
28	August 27	7:00pm	@ Indiana	NBATV; SSO; FS-I	86–80	McCoughtry (20)	Lyttle (9)	Castro Marques (3)	Conseco Fieldhouse; 9,242	15–13
29	August 30	7:30pm	Indiana	SSO	92–90	McCoughtry (28)	Lyttle (11)	Harding (6)	Philips Arena; 6,467	16–13

September: 4–17 (Home: 3–0; Road: 1–1)

Game	Date	Time (ET)	Opponent	TV	Score	High points	High rebounds	High assists	Location/Attendance	Record
30	September 1	7:00pm	@ Washington		81–85	McCoughtry (30)	Irvin (7)	Harding (8)	Verizon Center; 7,954	16–14
31	September 2	7:30pm	Washington	NBATV; SSO	95–73	Price (19)	Lyttle (8)	Harding (7)	Philips Arena; 6,579	17–14
32	September 4	3:00pm	Tulsa	SSO	73–52	McCoughtry (19)	Bales; Price (6)	Harding (10)	Philips Arena; 7,661	18–14
33	September 6	7:30pm	Connecticut	SSO	85–74	McCoughtry (35)	Lyttle (12)	Harding (8)	Philips Arena; 6,558	19–14
34	September 11	5:00pm	@ Indiana	NBATV; SSO; FS-I	93–88	McCoughtry (32)	Bales (11)	4 players (4)	Conseco Fieldhouse; 11,521	20–14

All games are viewable on WNBA LiveAccess or ESPN3.com

=== Playoffs ===
2011 Playoffs Schedule
Eastern Conference Semifinals vs. Connecticut (Won Series 2-0)

Game	Date	Time (ET)	Opponent	TV	Score	High points	High rebounds	High assists	Location/Attendance	Series
1	September 16	7:00pm	@ Connecticut	NBATV	89–84	Harding (21)	Lyttle (11)	Price (5)	Mohegan Sun Arena; 7,373	1–0
2	September 18	3:00pm	Connecticut	ESPN2	69–64	de Souza; Harding; Lyttle; McCoughtry (12)	de Souza (10)	Harding (6)	Philips Arena; 6,887	2–0

Eastern Conference Finals vs. Indiana (Won Series 2-1)

Game	Date	Time (ET)	Opponent	TV	Score	High points	High rebounds	High assists	Location/Attendance	Series
1	September 22	7:00pm	@ Indiana	ESPN2	74–82	Harding (17)	de Souza (13)	Harding (7)	Conseco Fieldhouse; 8,253	0–1
2	September 25	3:00pm	Indiana	ESPN2	94–77	Castro Marques (30)	Lyttle; Price (7)	Harding (7)	Philips Arena; 8,052	1–1
3	September 27	8:00pm	@ Indiana	ESPN2	83–67	McCoughtry (26)	Lyttle (11)	Harding (6)	Conseco Fieldhouse; 9,036	2–1

WNBA Finals vs. Minnesota (Lost Series 0-3)

Game	Date	Time (ET)	Opponent	TV	Score	High points	High rebounds	High assists	Location/Attendance	Series
1	October 2	8:30pm	@ Minnesota	ESPN	74–88	McCoughtry (33)	Bales (9)	Harding (5)	Target Center; 15,258	0–1
2	October 5	8:00pm	@ Minnesota	ESPN2	95–101	McCoughtry (38)	de Souza (10)	Harding (7)	Target Center; 15,124	0–2
3	October 7	8:00pm	Minnesota	ESPN2	67–73	McCoughtry (22)	de Souza (15)	Harding (7)	Philips Arena; 11,543	0–3

== Standings ==
Eastern Conference	W	L	PCT	GB	Home	Road	Conf.
Indiana Fever ^{x}	21	13	.618	–	13–4	8–9	13–9
Connecticut Sun ^{x}	21	13	.618	–	15–2	6–11	14–8
Atlanta Dream ^{x}	20	14	.588	1.0	11–6	9–8	14–8
New York Liberty ^{x}	19	15	.559	2.0	12-5	7–10	11–11
Chicago Sky ^{o}	14	20	.412	7.0	10–7	4–13	10–12
Washington Mystics ^{o}	6	28	.176	15.0	4–13	2–15	4–18

== Playoffs ==
**Conference semifinals** Best-of-3
E1	**Indiana**	**2**
E4	New York	1
**Eastern Conference**
E2	Connecticut	0
E3	**Atlanta**	**2**
W1	**Minnesota**	**2**
W4	San Antonio	1
**Western Conference**
W2	Seattle	1
W3	**Phoenix**	**2**

**Conference finals** Best-of-3
E1	Indiana	1
E3	**Atlanta**	**2**
W1	**Minnesota**	**2**
W3	Phoenix	0

**WNBA Finals**; Best-of-5
E3	Atlanta	0
W1	**Minnesota**	**3**

- **Bold** – Series winner
- Italics – Team with home-court advantage

== Statistics ==
Legend
GP	Games played	GS	Games started	MPG	Minutes per game	RPG	Rebounds per game
APG	Assists per game	SPG	Steals per game	BPG	Blocks per game	PPG	Points per game
FG%	Field-goal percentage	3P%	3-point field-goal percentage	FT%	Free-throw percentage	TO	Turnovers per game
PF	Fouls per game		Team leader		League leader

=== Regular season ===
Player	GP	GS	MPG	FG%	3P%	FT%	RPG	APG	SPG	BPG	PPG
Angel McCoughtry	33	30	27.9	42.4	26.4	77.7	5.2	2.5	2.2	1.0	21.6
Erika de Souza	32	32	27.4	49.9	0.0	65.5	7.5	1.0	1.2	1.3	11.8
Lindsey Harding	34	33	30.5	45.5	30.3	73.3	3.2	4.8	1.0	0.2	10.5
Sancho Lyttle	22	19	26.2	44.8	28.6	70.9	6.3	2.1	2.4	0.6	10.0
Armintie Price	34	21	23.4	51.9	0.0	60.8	3.0	2.8	1.5	0.1	8.5
Iziane Castro Marques	34	14	19.8	36.0	21.3	62.0	1.7	1.7	0.4	0.1	7.6
Coco Miller	31	5	17.4	43.2	33.3	54.1	1.9	1.4	0.6	0.0	7.3
Alison Bales	34	15	20.2	48.6	35.3	75.0	4.7	1.2	0.4	1.6	5.0
Courtney Paris	28	0	9.6	51.9	0.0	51.6	3.1	0.4	0.3	0.4	3.4
Shalee Lehning	18	0	12.1	48.1	44.4	61.5	1.3	2.3	0.4	0.1	2.1
Sandora Irvin	30	1	8.3	33.9	0.0	70.0	2.5	0.5	0.2	0.5	1.8
Kelly Mazzante	6	0	5.7	8.3	8.3	0.0	0.3	0.0	0.2	0.0	0.5

=== Playoffs ===
Player	GP	GS	MPG	FG%	3P%	FT%	RPG	APG	SPG	BPG	PPG
Angel McCoughtry	8	8	29.1	42.3	30.0	74.7	5.5	1.5	3.0	0.9	23.1
Lindsey Harding	8	8	37.8	39.1	25.0	74.3	3.0	5.9	1.9	0.3	14.5
Iziane Castro Marques	8	3	25.6	45.3	53.6	44.4	2.0	1.0	0.6	0.0	13.6
Erika de Souza	5	5	33.4	42.4	0.0	50.0	11.4	1.4	0.6	1.2	11.0
Sancho Lyttle	8	8	29.3	39.1	0.0	75.0	7.5	1.0	2.3	0.6	10.0
Armintie Price	8	8	30.1	46.8	0.0	66.7	5.3	3.5	1.6	0.3	7.5
Alison Bales	8	0	16.0	38.5	42.9	50.0	5.0	0.9	0.3	0.8	3.0
Coco Miller	8	0	8.0	20.0	20.0	50.0	1.3	0.9	0.5	0.0	1.3
Sandora Irvin	3	0	2.7	100.0	100.0	0.0	0.7	0.0	0.0	0.3	1.0
Courtney Paris	5	0	3.6	50.0	0.0	50.0	1.0	0.0	0.4	0.2	0.6

== Awards and honors ==
Recipient	Award	Date awarded	Ref.
Angel McCoughtry	Eastern Conference Player of the Week	July 25	
Angel McCoughtry	Eastern Conference Player of the Week	July 31	
Angel McCoughtry	Eastern Conference Player of the Week	August 22	
Angel McCoughtry	Eastern Conference Player of the Week	September 12	
Angel McCoughtry	Eastern Conference Player of the Month - July	August 2	
Angel McCoughtry	All-Star Starter	July 16	
Angel McCoughtry	All-WNBA First Team	September	
Angel McCoughtry	All-Defensive First Team	September	
Sancho Lyttle	All-Defensive Second Team	September	
Armintie Price	All-Defensive Second Team	September	
