= Lindsey Harding =

American basketball player (born 1984)

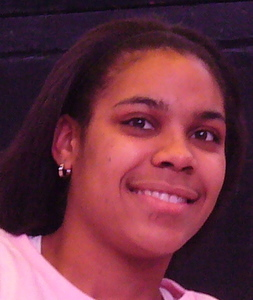
- Harding, c. 2007

Los Angeles Lakers
- Title: Assistant coach
- League: NBA

Personal information
- Born: June 12, 1984 (age 42) Mobile, Alabama, U.S.
- Listed height: 5 ft 8 in (1.73 m)
- Listed weight: 139 lb (63 kg)

Career information
- High school: Cy-Fair (Cypress, Texas)
- College: Duke (2002–2007)
- WNBA draft: 2007: 1st round, 1st overall pick
- Drafted by: Phoenix Mercury
- Playing career: 2007–2017
- Position: Point guard
- Number: 10, 12
- Coaching career: 2022–present

Career history

Playing
- 2007–2008: Minnesota Lynx
- 2008–2009: Mersin BSB. S.K.
- 2009–2010: VICI Aistes Kaunas
- 2009–2010: Washington Mystics
- 2011–2012: Atlanta Dream
- 2013: Galatasaray
- 2013–2014: Los Angeles Sparks
- 2014–2015: Edirne Belediyesi
- 2015–2016: Dynamo Kursk
- 2016: Yakin Dogu
- 2016: New York Liberty
- 2016: Phoenix Mercury
- 2016–2017: Beşiktaş J.K.

Coaching
- 2022–2023: Sacramento Kings (assistant)
- 2023–2024: Stockton Kings
- 2024–present: Los Angeles Lakers (assistant)

Career highlights
- As player: WNBA All-Rookie Team (2007); Turkish Cup winner (2013); Naismith College Player of the Year (2007); WBCA Defensive Player of the Year (2007); Frances Pomeroy Naismith Award (2007); Nancy Lieberman Award (2007); All-American – Kodak, USBWA (2007); First-team All-American – AP (2007); ACC Player of the Year (2007); ACC Female Athlete of the Year (2007); First-team All-ACC (2007); 2× ACC Defensive Player of the Year (2006, 2007); 3× ACC All-Defensive team (2004, 2006, 2007); ACC All-Freshman Team (2003); As head coach: NBA G League Coach of the Year (2024)
- Stats at WNBA.com
- Stats at Basketball Reference

Lindsey Marcie Harding (born June 12, 1984) is an American professional basketball coach and former player. She is an assistant coach for the Los Angeles Lakers of the National Basketball Association (NBA). Harding played for the Minnesota Lynx, Washington Mystics, Atlanta Dream, Los Angeles Sparks, New York Liberty and Phoenix Mercury of the Women's National Basketball Association (WNBA) and played overseas in Turkey and Russia. She was previously a scout and a player development coach for the Philadelphia 76ers.

She was born in Mobile, Alabama, but grew up in Houston, Texas, and also holds a Belarusian passport.

== College career ==
Harding had a standout career at Duke University. As a freshman in 2002–2003 she was named to the All-ACC Freshman Team, averaging 6.2 points, 3.9 rebounds, 3.4 assists, 1.8 steals and had an ACC-best 2.1 assist/turnover ratio. As a sophomore in 2003–04 she averaged 7.3 points, 4.5 rebounds, 4.9 assists, 2.0 steals and had an ACC-best 2.2 assist/turnover ratio.

Harding was redshirted for the 2004–05 season because of violation of team rules. She returned as a junior for 2005–2006 and was an Honorable Mention Kodak and Associated Press All-America, ACC Defensive Player of the Year. She averaged 10.7 points, 4.5 assists, 3.7 rebounds and 2.1 steals as a junior.

Harding finished her college career with 1,298 points, 25 blocks, 579 assists, 296 steals and 565 rebounds in 128 games (school record). She was only the sixth player in ACC history to register 1,000 points, 500 assists, 500 rebounds and 250 steals.

Despite her tremendous career numbers, contributions and a 32–2 record, she left Duke without winning an NCAA championship. Harding's senior season at Duke ended with the Rutgers Scarlet Knights' upset of the Blue Devils in the Sweet Sixteen round of the NCAA tournament, a one-point upset sealed by Harding's missing two free throws with 0.1 seconds remaining in the game.

Following her senior season, Harding entered the 2007 WNBA draft.

On January 20, 2008, Harding was honored by having her jersey number (10) retired, becoming only the second Duke women's basketball player after former teammate Alana Beard to be bestowed that honor. Some have questioned whether Duke should have bestowed such an honor, given the undisclosed reasons behind her redshirt year. In addition, on December 18, 2007, her jersey No. 12 was retired by Cy-Fair High School.

=== College statistics ===
Legend
| GP | Games played | GS | Games started | MPG | Minutes per game |
| FG% | Field goal percentage | 3P% | 3-point field goal percentage | FT% | Free throw percentage |
| RPG | Rebounds per game | APG | Assists per game | SPG | Steals per game |
| BPG | Blocks per game | PPG | Points per game | **Bold** | Career high |

| Year | Team | GP | Points | FG% | 3P% | FT% | RPG | APG | SPG | BPG | PPG |
|---|---|---|---|---|---|---|---|---|---|---|---|
| 2002–03 | Duke | **37** | 231 | 43.8 | 7.7 | 76.5 | 3.9 | 3.4 | 1.8 | 0.2 | 6.2 |
| 2003–04 | Duke | 34 | 230 | 45.9 | 24.1 | 65.5 | **4.5** | **4.9** | 2.0 | 0.1 | 6.8 |
| 2004–05 | Duke | Redshirt | | | | | | | | | |
| 2005–06 | Duke | 35 | 374 | **48.1** | **41.1** | **78.1** | 3.7 | 4.5 | **2.1** | 0.1 | 10.7 |
| 2006–07 | Duke | 34 | **463** | 44.4 | 38.1 | 74.8 | 4.0 | 3.9 | 1.5 | **0.3** | **13.6** |
| Career | Duke | 140 | 1298 | 45.5 | 34.2 | 73.9 | 4.0 | 4.1 | 1.9 | 0.2 | 9.3 |

=== College awards ===
- 2003 ACC All-Rookie team
- 2006 Duke Classic MVP
- 2006, 2007 ACC Defensive Player of the Year
- 2007 Naismith National Player of the Year
- 2007 WBCA National Defensive Player
- 2007 ESPN.com National Player of the Year
- 2007 Nancy Lieberman Award
- 2007 Frances Pomeroy Naismith Award
- 2007 USBWA All-American
- 2007 John R. Wooden Award All-American
- 2007 Associated Press First Team All-American
- 2007 ACC Player of the Year
- 2007 All ACC First Team
- 2007 Duke Offensive Player of the Year
- 2007 Duke Practice Player of the Year
- 2007 Duke Heart and Hustle Award

== Professional career ==
=== WNBA ===
Harding was drafted first overall in the 2007 WNBA draft by the Phoenix Mercury and was traded to the Minnesota Lynx for forward Tangela Smith the same day.

During the 2007 season, Harding was leading all rookies in scoring before a knee injury ended her season on July 10. She was named to the WNBA All-Rookie Team by the end of the season and finished with averages of 11.7 points and 3.9 assists per game.

On January 30, 2009, Harding was traded to the Washington Mystics for the first and second round picks in the 2009 WNBA draft. She had a stellar season with the Mystics, averaging a career-high 12.8 points and 4.6 assists per game. In her second season with the Mystics, Harding scored a career-high 33 points against the Indiana Fever.

On April 11, 2011, Harding was traded to the Atlanta Dream along with the 2012 2nd round draft pick in exchange for Ta'Shia Phillips, Kelly Miller, and the Dream's 2012 1st round draft pick. In her first season with the Dream, Harding was the starting point guard on the team's roster. Along with Izi Castro Marques, Érika de Souza, Sancho Lyttle and Angel McCoughtry, the Dream were a championship contender in the league. Harding experienced her first WNBA Finals appearance with the team as they had advanced all the way to the WNBA Finals for the second year in a row, but lost to her former team, the Minnesota Lynx in a 3-game sweep.

On February 5, 2013, Harding signed with the Los Angeles Sparks. In her first season with the Sparks, Harding was ranked 5th in assists with a career-high 5.2 assists per game. On August 4, 2013, Harding had 11 points along with a career-high 14 assists in a regular season victory against her other former team, the Washington Mystics. Despite being an effective distributor on a talented team, the Sparks were nowhere near championship contention as they were eliminated in the first round of the playoffs. In 2015, the Sparks waived Harding after two seasons with the team.

On April 18, 2016, Harding signed with the New York Liberty. She was waived on June 15, after appearing in five games with the Liberty.

On June 24, 2016, Harding signed with the Phoenix Mercury. She was brought in to back up All-Star point guard Diana Taurasi, and coach Sandy Brondello, who worked with Harding while she was with the Sparks, felt that she fit the position. Harding appeared in 21 regular season games and then 5 playoff games while helping the Mercury advance all the way to the league semifinals. Following the team's elimination by the Minnesota Lynx, Harding announced her retirement from the WNBA after playing 9 seasons in the league.

=== Overseas ===
In the 2008-09 off-season, Harding played for Mersin BSB. S.K. in Turkey. In the 2009-10 off-season, Harding played in Lithuania for VICI Aistes Kaunas. In the 2012-13 off-season, Harding played in Turkey for Galatasaray. In the 2014-15 off-season, Harding played for Edirne Belediyesi in Turkey. In the 2015-16 off-season, Harding played for Dynamo Kursk in Russia for the first portion and spent the rest of the off-season playing for Yakin Dogu in Turkey. Following her retirement from the WNBA, Harding signed with Beşiktaş J.K. for the 2016-17 off-season.

== National team career ==
=== USA Basketball ===
Harding was twice part of the long list for the United States women's national basketball team, but missed out on both the 2010 FIBA World Championship in the Czech Republic, and the 2012 Summer Olympics in London. She is the first Naismith winner since Kate Starbird to not have played for Team USA.

=== Belarus ===
In 2015, Harding was invited to play for the Belarus women's national basketball team, who needed more point guards. She was approved to the EuroBasket Women 2015 roster after getting a Belarusian passport, and helped the team finish the tournament in fourth. This led to Harding playing for Belarus in the 2016 FIBA World Olympic Qualifying Tournament for Women, that could get her an Olympic spot. With Harding as its leading scorer, Belarus won the fifth and final place for the 2016 Olympic tournament. Harding was listed for the Belarusian roster, though she missed part of the preparation while solving her WNBA commitments.

== Coaching career ==
=== NBA and G League ===
Harding was a player development coach and scout with the Philadelphia 76ers during the 2018–19 season.

Between 2019 and 2023, Harding spent four seasons with the Sacramento Kings as an assistant coach/player development coach. She was a full-time assistant in the 2022–23 season.

On June 20, 2023, Harding was named head coach of the Stockton Kings of the NBA G League. She led the team to the best record in the 2023–24 season, going 24–10 overall and clinching the No. 1 overall seed in the Western Conference. She was subsequently named the NBA G League Coach of the Year, becoming the first head coach in Stockton Kings history to win the award and made history as the first-ever woman to receive the recognition.

In July 2024, Harding was named an assistant coach of the Los Angeles Lakers.

=== National team ===
In 2021, Harding was named the inaugural head coach of the South Sudan women's national basketball team.

As of June 2023, Harding was head coach of the Mexico women's national basketball team.

== WNBA career statistics ==
Legend
| GP | Games played | GS | Games started | MPG | Minutes per game | RPG | Rebounds per game |
| APG | Assists per game | SPG | Steals per game | BPG | Blocks per game | PPG | Points per game |
| TO | Turnovers per game | FG% | Field-goal percentage | 3P% | 3-point field-goal percentage | FT% | Free-throw percentage |
| **Bold** | Career best | ° | League leader |

=== Regular season ===
| Year | Team | GP | GS | MPG | FG% | 3P% | FT% | RPG | APG | SPG | BPG | TO | PPG |
|---|---|---|---|---|---|---|---|---|---|---|---|---|---|
| 2007 | Minnesota | 20 | 20 | 30.1 | .354 | .229 | .679 | **4.4** | 3.9 | 1.0 | **0.3** | 2.3 | 11.7 |
| 2008 | Minnesota | 24 | 11 | 24.6 | .367 | .080 | .694 | 2.3 | 3.2 | 1.1 | 0.1 | 2.2 | 6.4 |
| 2009 | Washington | **34** | **34** | **35.1** | .435 | **.323** | .748 | 4.0 | 4.5 | 1.2 | **0.3** | 2.9 | **12.8** |
| 2010 | Washington | **34** | **34** | 33.2 | .445 | .288 | .766 | 3.0 | 4.0 | **1.3** | 0.1 | 2.7 | 12.1 |
| 2011 | Atlanta | **34** | 33 | 30.5 | **.455** | .303 | .733 | 3.2 | 4.8 | 1.0 | 0.1 | 2.3 | 10.5 |
| 2012 | Atlanta | **34** | 32 | 30.6 | .425 | .241 | .818 | 2.8 | 4.5 | **1.3** | 0.2 | 2.0 | 12.3 |
| 2013 | Los Angeles | 33 | 33 | 30.6 | .441 | .182 | .759 | 2.7 | **5.2** | 1.0 | **0.3** | 2.4 | 10.9 |
| 2014 | Los Angeles | 31 | 10 | 22.7 | .333 | .227 | .786 | 1.8 | 3.2 | 1.0 | 0.0 | 1.4 | 5.7 |
| 2016* | New York | 5 | 3 | 22.9 | .320 | .000 | 1.000 | 2.8 | 3.6 | 0.2 | 0.0 | 1.2 | 3.6 |
| 2016* | Phoenix | 21 | 0 | 15.6 | .370 | .400 | .870 | 1.7 | 2.1 | 0.5 | 0.1 | 0.9 | 3.9 |
| Career | 9 years, 6 teams | 270 | 210 | 28.7 | .414 | .252 | .755 | 2.9 | 4.0 | 1.1 | 0.2 | 2.2 | 9.8 |

=== Postseason ===
| Year | Team | GP | GS | MPG | FG% | 3P% | FT% | RPG | APG | SPG | BPG | TO | PPG |
|---|---|---|---|---|---|---|---|---|---|---|---|---|---|
| 2009 | Washington | 2 | 2 | **40.5**° | .385 | .000 | **1.000** | 2.5 | 4.0 | 1.5 | 0.0 | 5.0 | 10.5 |
| 2010 | Washington | 2 | 2 | 33.5 | .219 | **.400** | .625 | 2.5 | 3.0 | 2.0 | 0.0 | 3.0 | 10.5 |
| 2011 | Atlanta | **8** | **8** | 37.8° | .391 | .250 | .743 | 3.0 | **5.9**° | 1.8 | 0.2 | 1.6 | 14.5 |
| 2012 | Atlanta | 3 | 3 | 38.0° | .426 | .250 | .889 | **4.7** | 5.3 | **2.6** | **0.3** | 3.6 | **19.0** |
| 2013 | Los Angeles | 3 | 3 | 32.9 | .333 | .000 | .765 | 3.0 | 3.3 | 0.3 | 0.0 | 2.3 | 11.7 |
| 2014 | Los Angeles | 2 | 0 | 9.8 | **.500** | .000 | .667 | 0.5 | 2.0 | 1.0 | 0.0 | **0.0** | 4.0 |
| 2016 | Phoenix | 5 | 0 | 9.1 | .462 | .000 | .000 | 0.4 | 1.4 | 0.0 | 0.2 | 1.0 | 2.4 |
| Career | 7 years, 4 teams | 25 | 18 | 29.1 | .376 | .214 | .733 | 2.4 | 3.9 | 1.3 | 0.2 | 2.1 | 10.8 |
