= Rebekkah Brunson =

American basketball player and coach (born 1981)

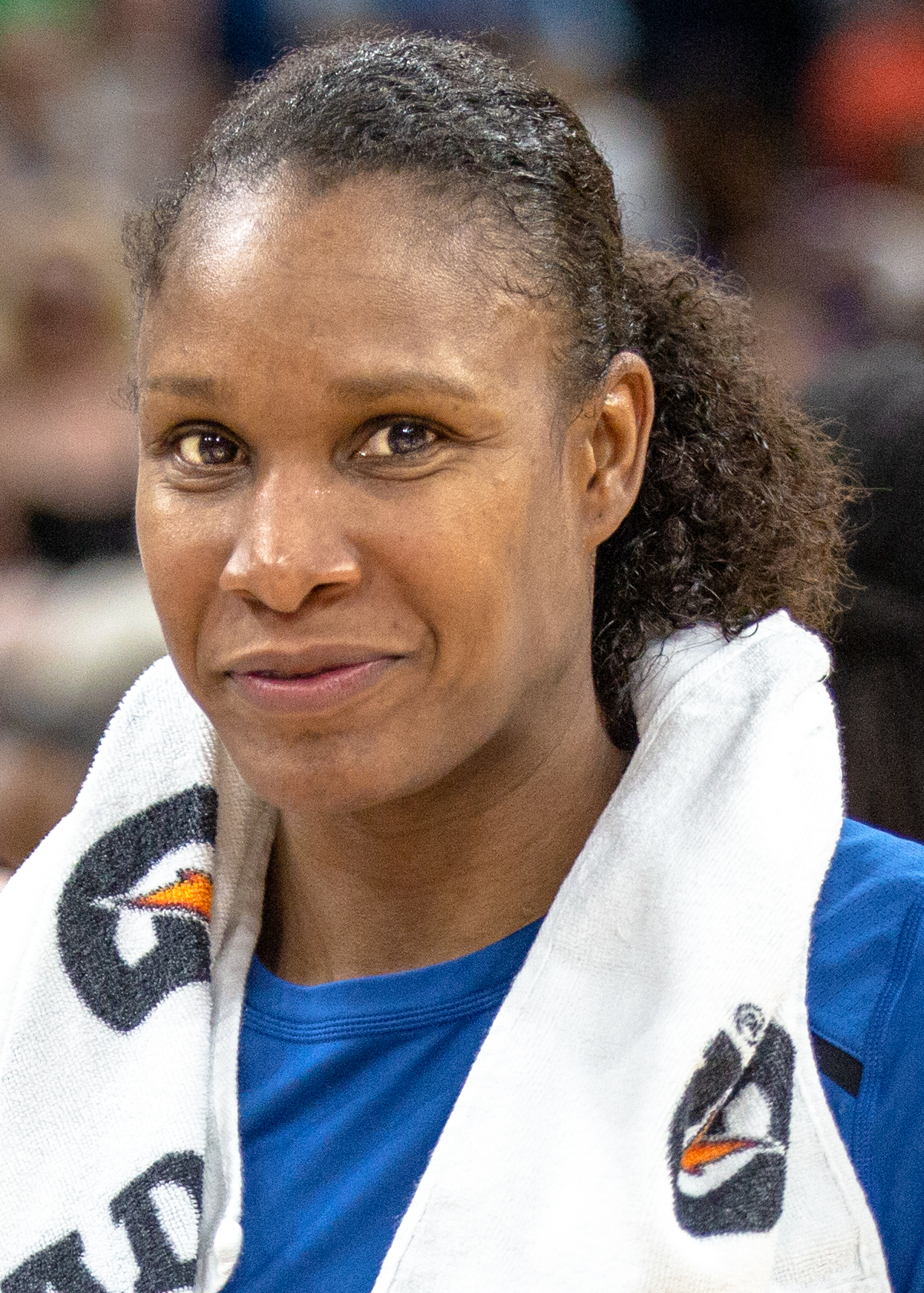
- Brunson in 2018

Minnesota Lynx
- Position: Assistant coach
- League: WNBA

Personal information
- Born: December 11, 1981 (age 44) Washington, D.C., U.S.
- Listed height: 6 ft 2 in (1.88 m)
- Listed weight: 185 lb (84 kg)

Career information
- High school: Oxon Hill (Oxon Hill, Maryland)
- College: Georgetown (2000–2004)
- WNBA draft: 2004: 1st round, 10th overall pick
- Drafted by: Sacramento Monarchs
- Playing career: 2004–2018
- Coaching career: 2020–present

Career history

Playing
- 2004–2009: Sacramento Monarchs
- 2004–2006: Dexia Namur
- 2006–2007: Dynamo Moscow
- 2007–2010: Taranto Cras Basket
- 2010–2011: Ros Casares Valencia
- 2011–2012: Nadezhda Orenburg
- 2012–2013: USK Praha
- 2013–2016: Dynamo Kursk
- 2010–2018: Minnesota Lynx

Coaching
- 2020–present: Minnesota Lynx (assistant)

Career highlights
- 5× WNBA champion (2005, 2011, 2013, 2015, 2017); 5× WNBA All-Star (2007, 2011, 2013, 2017, 2018); WNBA All-Defensive First Team (2011); 6× WNBA All-Defensive Second Team (2007, 2008, 2010, 2013, 2017, 2018); No. 32 retired by Minnesota Lynx; Big East Defensive Player of the Year (2004); 2× First-team All-Big East (2003, 2004); Big East Freshman of the Year (2001); Big East All-Freshman Team (2001); As assistant coach: WNBA Commissioner's Cup Champion (2024)
- Stats at WNBA.com
- Stats at Basketball Reference
Medals
Women's basketball
Representing the United States
Pan American Games
Silver medal – second place	2003 Santo Domingo	Team

Rebekkah Brunson (born December 11, 1981) is an American basketball coach and broadcast analyst. She is currently an assistant coach with the Minnesota Lynx of the Women's National Basketball Association (WNBA). Brunson is a former forward for the Lynx and is the only player to win five WNBA championships. She held the WNBA record for rebounding, which she ceded to Lynx center Sylvia Fowles in 2020.

Brunson was born in Washington, D.C., and attended Oxon Hill High School in Maryland. Brunson graduated from Georgetown University in 2004 as its women's basketball program's all-time leading rebounder. She also played on the U.S. team in the 2003 Pan American Games.

== College statistics ==
Legend
GP	Games played	GS	Games started	MPG	Minutes per game
FG%	Field goal percentage	3P%	3-point field goal percentage	FT%	Free throw percentage
RPG	Rebounds per game	APG	Assists per game	SPG	Steals per game
BPG	Blocks per game	PPG	Points per game	**Bold**	Career high

Year	Team	GP	Points	FG%	3P%	FT%	RPG	APG	SPG	BPG	PPG
2000–01	Georgetown	**32**	474	.509	–	.563	9.2	0.7	1.8	0.9	14.8
2001–02	Georgetown	18	272	.481	.083	**.670**	8.5	0.6	1.9	1.1	15.1
2002–03	Georgetown	29	481	.463	**.438**	**.670**	10.7	**1.5**	**2.0**	1.8	16.6
2003–04	Georgetown	28	**535**	**.485**	.182	.608	**12.0**	1.3	1.7	1.8	**19.1**
Career		107	1,762	.485	.256	.625	10.2	1.1	1.9	1.4	16.5

== WNBA career ==
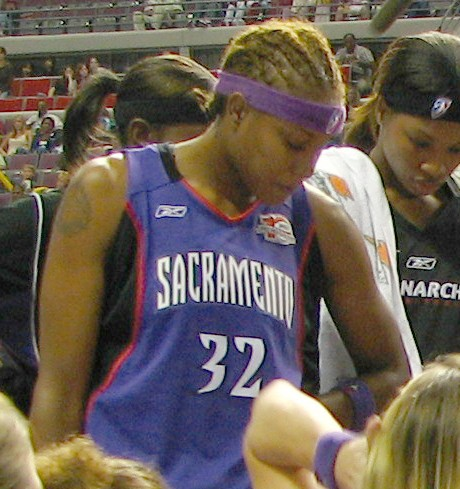
Brunson in 2006

The Sacramento Monarchs chose Brunson in the 1st round of the 2004 WNBA draft as the tenth overall pick. She played in Sacramento for six seasons and contributed to the Monarchs' 2005 WNBA Championship victory. She led the league in offensive rebounds per game (3.9) and total offensive rebounds (130) for the 2007 regular season.

After the Monarchs suspended operations in the fall of 2009, the Minnesota Lynx acquired Brunson in the 2010 dispersal draft. In 2011, Brunson tied a WNBA record with six consecutive double-doubles, and was named WNBA Player of the Month for June, the first member of the Lynx to be so honored. She was later named to the 2011 WNBA All-Star Game, and started in place of an injured Candace Parker.

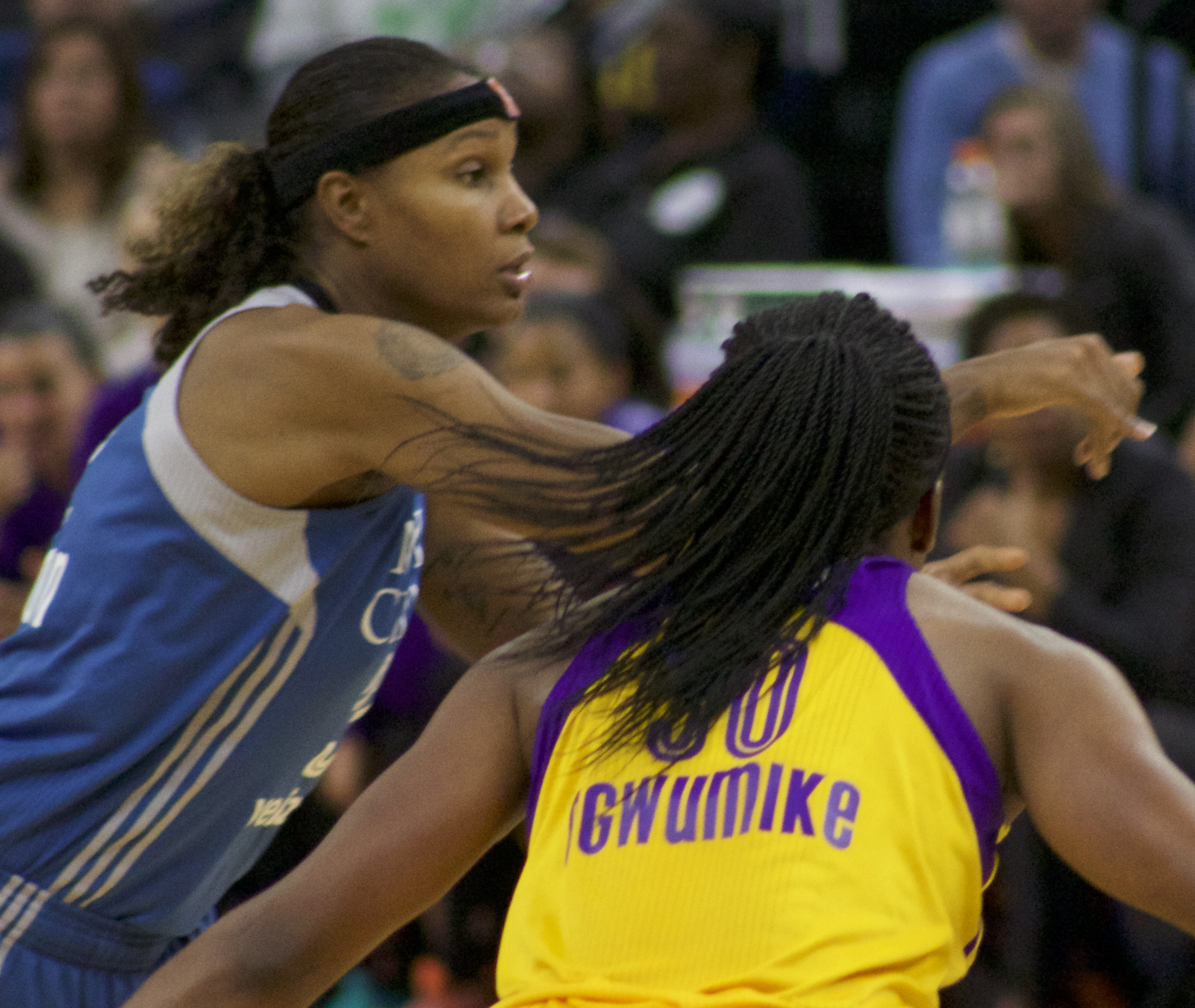
Nneka Ogwumike guards Brunson in 2016

Brunson led the Lynx in field goal percentage and rebounds in a year where the team had the best record in the WNBA. She was honored with her first appearance on the WNBA All-Defensive First Team; she had earned second-team honors three previous times. The Lynx would go on to win the 2011 WNBA Championship.

Brunson won her third league title in 2013. Brunson again made the All-Star Game, starting in place of the injured Brittney Griner. Brunson set the career mark for rebounds in the Finals, with 130, breaking the record held by former teammate Taj McWilliams-Franklin. She also broke McWilliams-Franklin's record for Finals games played, with 19.

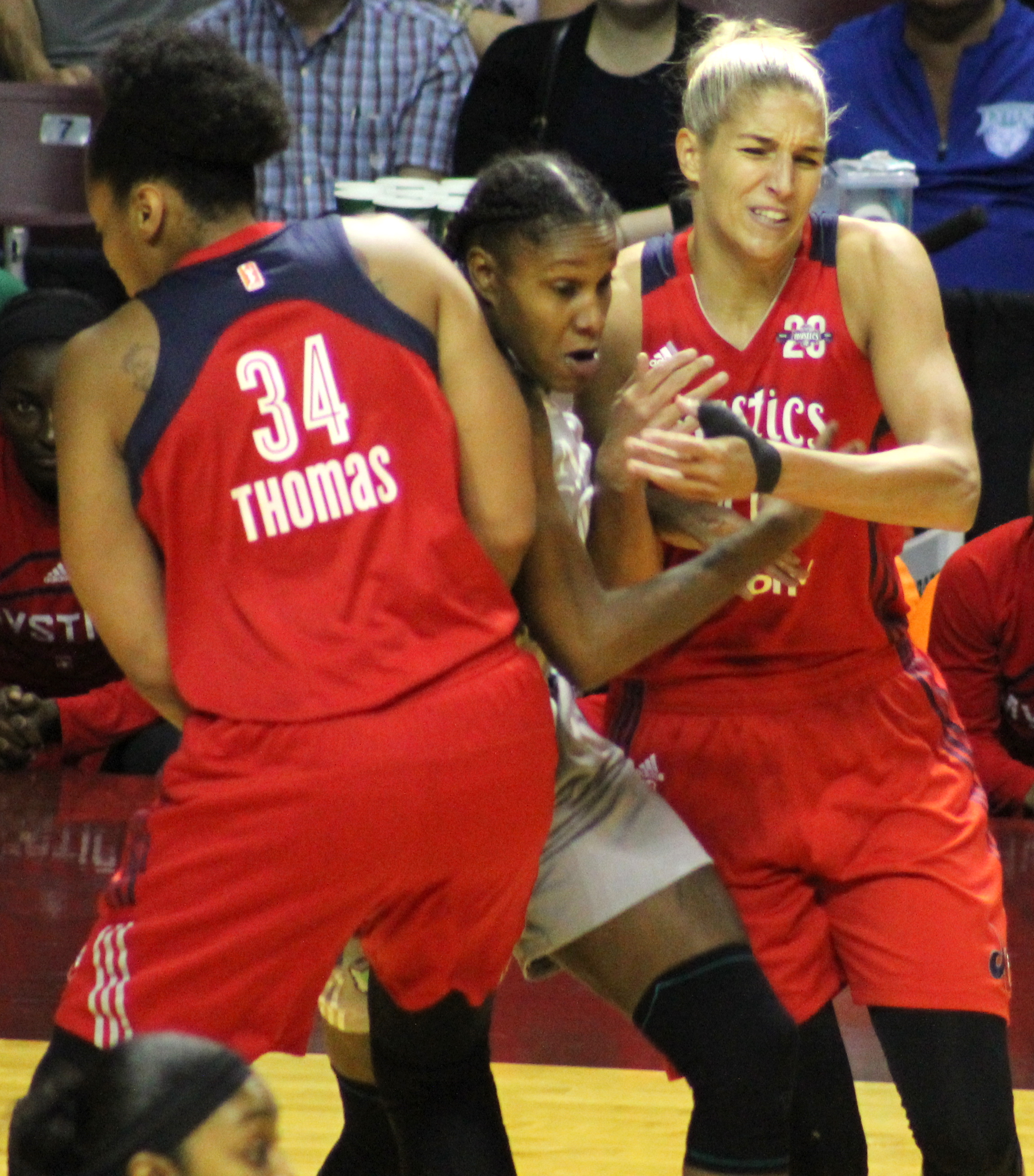
Brunson evading Krystal Thomas and Elena Delle Donne in the 2017 WNBA playoffs

In 2015, Brunson would win her fourth WNBA championship with the Lynx as they defeated the Indiana Fever in five games.

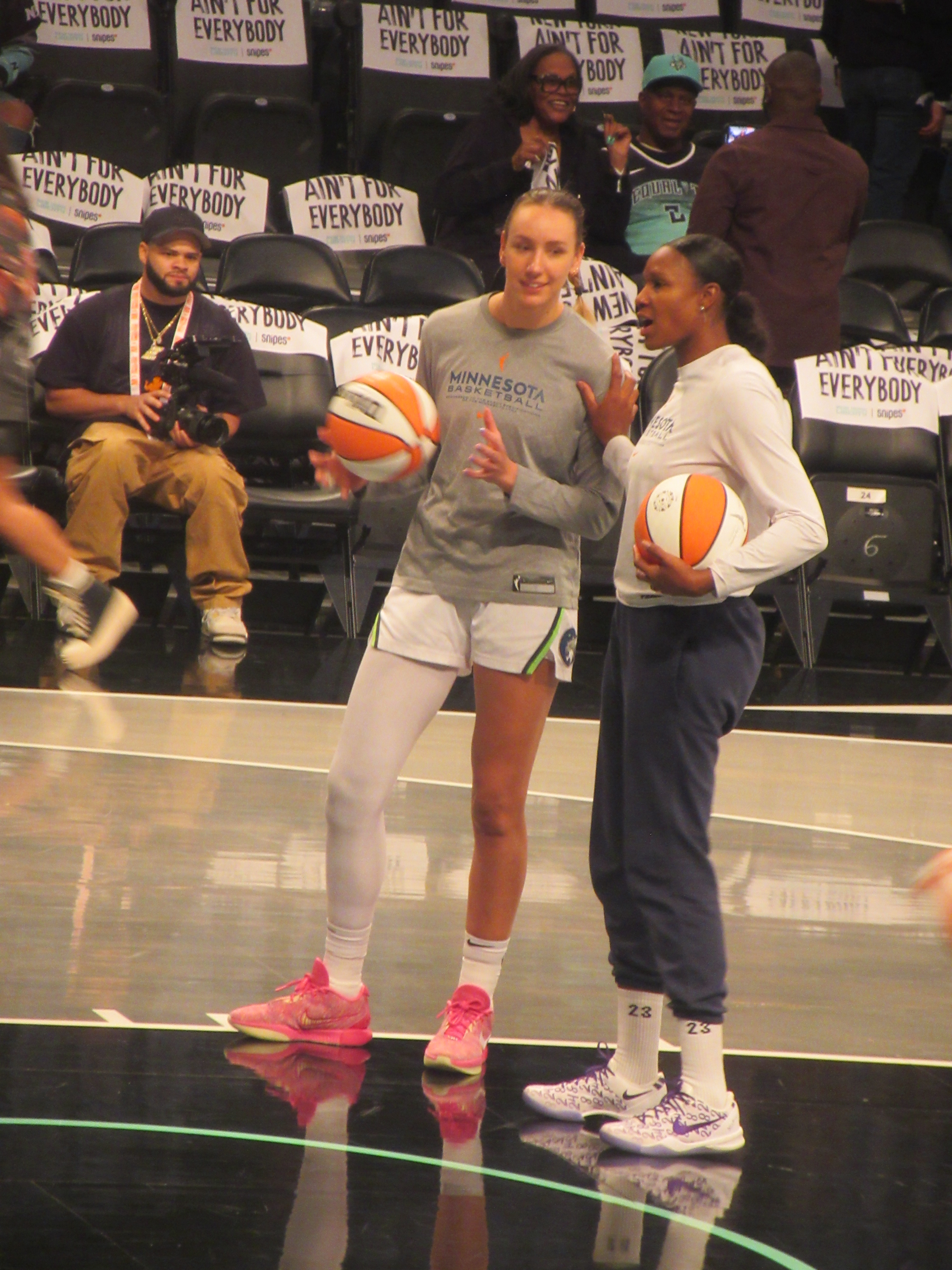
Brunson as an assistant coach before 2024 WNBA Finals Game 1

Following a finals loss in 2016 to the Los Angeles Sparks, Brunson would be selected into the 2017 WNBA All-Star Game, replacing an injured Brittney Griner, making it her fourth career all-star game appearance. As of 2017, Brunson also became the all-time league leader in career offensive rebounds.

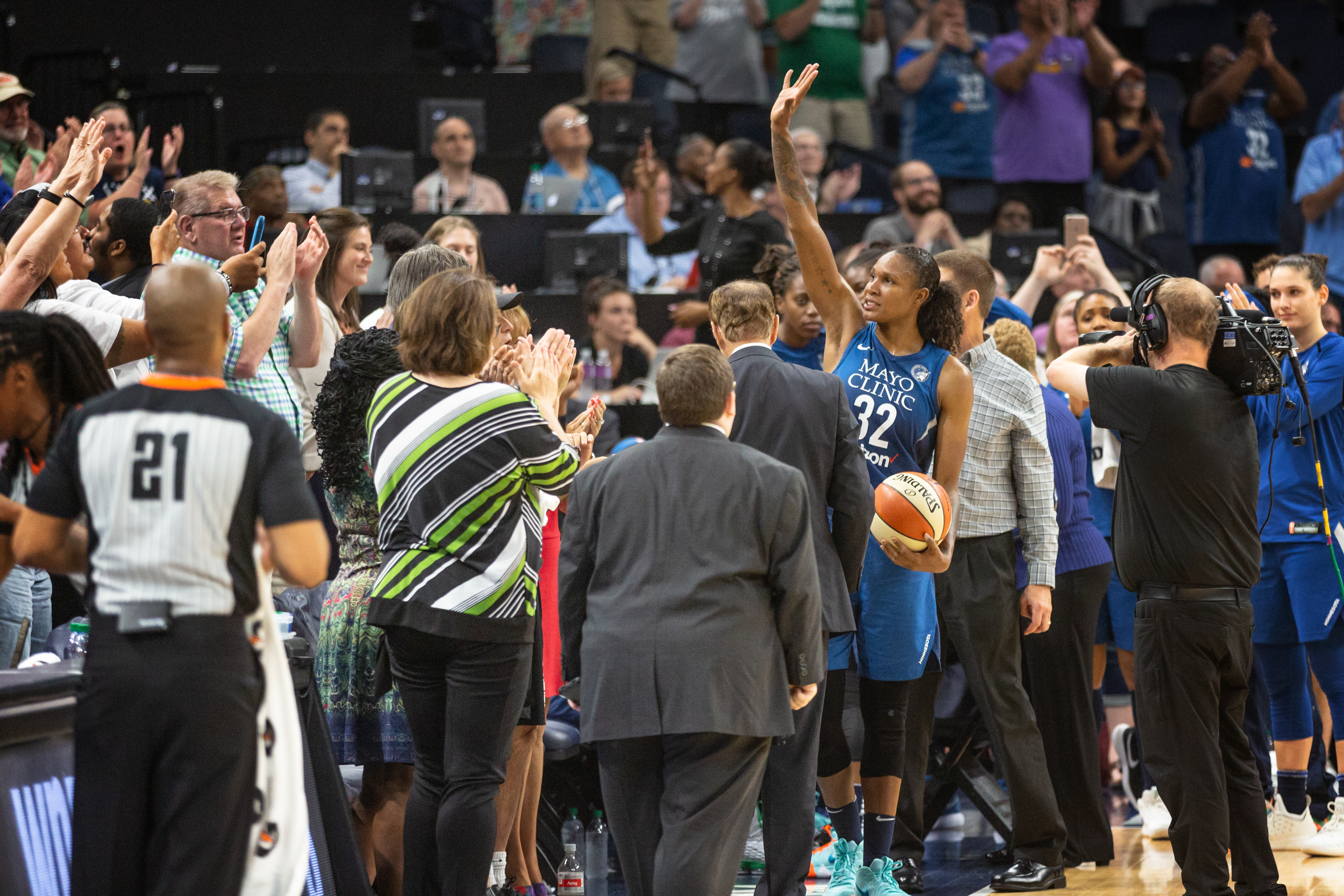
Brunson after setting all-time rebound record in 2018

Later on in the 2017 season, Brunson became the first player in league history to win 5 WNBA championships, as the Lynx defeated the Los Angeles Sparks in five games, avenging the previous year's Finals loss.

In 2018, Brunson passed Tamika Catchings, who had 3,317 career rebounds, to become the league's all-time rebounding leader. She was also announced as an all-star replacement for Nneka Ogwumike in the 2018 WNBA All-Star Game, making it her fifth all-star appearance. Brunson however missed the playoffs due to injury. The Lynx finished 18–16 with the number 7 seed and lost in the first round elimination game to the Los Angeles Sparks, ending their streak of three consecutive finals appearances.

Brunson officially retired in February 2020, when she was hired as assistant coach of the Lynx. The Lynx retired her jersey on July 3, 2022. In 2023, Brunson was named to the Lynx All-25 Team as one of the best 25 players in the team's history.

== Overseas career ==
During WNBA offseasons, Brunson has played for Taranto, an Italian professional basketball team, for the Dynamo team based in Russia, and Dexia Namur, a professional club in Belgium, and for Nadezhda team based in Orenburg, Russia. She then played for USK Praha, with which she won the Czech League title (4–2 vs BK Brno) and reached the Women's Euroleague Top 16. She played with Dynamo Kursk, along with Lynx teammate Seimone Augustus from 2013 to 2016.

== USA Basketball ==
Brunson was named to the team representing the US at the 2003 Pan American Games. The team lost the opening game to Cuba, then rebounded to win their next five games, including an overtime win against Brazil. They then faced Cuba for the gold medal, falling short 75–64 to take home the silver medal. Brunson shot 57% from the field, and ended up as the leading scorer as well as the leading rebounder for the USA team.

Brunson was one of 21 finalists for the 2012 U.S. Women's Olympic Basketball Team Roster. The 20 professional women's basketball players, plus one collegiate player (Brittney Griner), were selected by the USA Basketball Women's National Team Player Selection Committee to compete for the final roster which will represent the US at the 2012 Olympics in London.

== Broadcasting ==
Brunson made her broadcasting debut in a January 2019 game between the Minnesota Timberwolves and the Boston Celtics. She has continued as an analyst in addition to her coaching work. In the 2023-24 Timberwolves season, Brunson has joined Kevin Lynch and Marney Gellner in providing analysis after regular season games on the Wolves Live broadcast.

== Personal life ==
Brunson established and manages the 32 Foundation (named for her jersey number), which sponsors academic and athletic opportunities for youth in the metropolitan DC area. Rebekkah Brunson and wife Bobbi Jo Lamar Brunson welcomed their son Graham Matteo Lamar Brunson on September 29, 2018. The two had a second son in November 2023. Brunson and her wife own and operate Sweet TrooVī, which began as a Belgian waffle food truck inspired by Brunson's time playing professional basketball in Belgium and has since evolved into a mission-driven company offering authentic Liege waffles and gourmet plant-based cookies distributed at both local and national levels.

== WNBA career statistics ==
Legend
GP	Games played	GS	Games started	MPG	Minutes per game	RPG	Rebounds per game
APG	Assists per game	SPG	Steals per game	BPG	Blocks per game	PPG	Points per game
TO	Turnovers per game	FG%	Field-goal percentage	3P%	3-point field-goal percentage	FT%	Free-throw percentage
**Bold**	Career best	°	League leader

†	Denotes seasons in which Brunson won a WNBA championship

=== Regular season ===
Year	Team	GP	GS	MPG	FG%	3P%	FT%	RPG	APG	SPG	BPG	TO	PPG
2004	Sacramento	**34**	1	14.5	.421	.000	.717	3.6	0.6	0.6	0.3	**0.8**	4.4
2005^{†}	Sacramento	**34**	16	21.2	.427	.000	.598	5.5	0.5	0.8	0.4	1.2	7.8
2006	Sacramento	**34**	17	17.7	.461	.000	.587	5.6	0.5	0.6	0.4	1.1	6.8
2007	Sacramento	33	29	28.2	.473	.000	.686	8.9	0.7	1.3	**0.9**	1.7	11.5
2008	Sacramento	30	30	26.0	.500	.000	.671	7.1	0.4	1.2	0.6	1.7	10.9
2009	Sacramento	27	17	24.6	.486	.000	.783	7.0	0.3	**1.4**	0.5	1.6	**12.3**
2010	Minnesota	30	30	**30.5**	.429	.000	.663	**10.3**	0.8	1.2	**0.9**	1.6	11.3
2011^{†}	Minnesota	**34**	**34**	27.6	**.511**	.000	.667	8.9	1.2	0.8	0.5	1.5	10.2
2012	Minnesota	31	31	27.0	.505	.000	.679	8.9	1.2	1.1	**0.9**	1.2	11.4
2013^{†}	Minnesota	33	33	29.2	.497	**1.000**	.636	8.9	1.5	1.2	0.8	1.1	10.6
2014	Minnesota	11	11	27.5	.395	.000	.714	8.2	1.5	0.2	0.7	0.9	7.2
2015^{†}	Minnesota	**34**	**34**	27.8	.457	.000	.831	8.1	1.8	1.1	0.7	1.5	7.8
2016	Minnesota	33	33	24.6	.477	.000	**.857**	7.3	1.8	0.9	0.2	**0.8**	7.4
2017^{†}	Minnesota	30	30	26.9	.449	.348	.711	6.7	1.5	1.1	0.4	1.6	10.2
2018	Minnesota	25	25	27.7	.405	.375	.673	6.8	**2.4**	0.8	0.5	1.4	7.2
Career	15 years, 2 teams	453	368	25.2	.466	.341	.692	7.4	1.1	1.0	0.6	1.4	9.2

=== Postseason ===
Year	Team	GP	GS	MPG	FG%	3P%	FT%	RPG	APG	SPG	BPG	TO	PPG
2004	Sacramento	6	0	13.3	.350	.000	.714	2.8	0.5	0.3	0.6	**0.5**	3.2
2005^{†}	Sacramento	8	8	**34.3**	.446	.000	.455	5.5	1.3	0.6	0.5	1.1	6.9
2006	Sacramento	9	0	17.1	.333	.000	.643	3.6	0.6	0.3	0.6	1.0	6.0
2007	Sacramento	3	3	29.3	**.613**	.000	.700	6.3	0.3	1.0	**1.6**	0.6	**15.0**
2011^{†}	Minnesota	8	8	30.6	.473	.000	.781	**10.8**	1.5	0.8	0.6	1.6	11.9
2012	Minnesota	9	9	33.7	.489	.000	.792	9.7	1.2	0.7	1.4	2.1	11.9
2013^{†}	Minnesota	7	7	32.5	.509	.000	.692	10.1	2.3	0.7	0.8	1.7	10.6
2014	Minnesota	5	5	29.0	.417	.000	**1.000**	7.0	1.4	**1.4**	0.6	0.8	6.8
2015^{†}	Minnesota	**10**	**10**	29.5	.435	.000	.650	7.2	1.7	1.2	0.5	1.2	5.3
2016	Minnesota	8	8	29.2	.473	.000	.792	6.5	**2.5**	1.2	0.6	1.5	8.9
2017^{†}	Minnesota	8	8	27.9	.361	.111	.793	6.0	1.6	1.1	0.5	1.3	9.5
Career	11 years, 2 teams	81	66	27.0	.447	.091	.726	7.0	1.4	0.9	0.7	1.3	8.4

== See also ==
- WNBA records
- List of WNBA career rebounding leaders
