= 2011 WNBA playoffs =

Professional women's basketball tournament

- Dates: September 15 – October 7, 2011

Final positions
- Champions: Minnesota Lynx
- Runners-up: Atlanta Dream

Tournament statistics
- Attendance: 9,232 per game
- Scoring leader (s): Angel McCoughtry (Atlanta) (23.1 PPG)

Awards
- MVP: Seimone Augustus (Minnesota)

The 2011 WNBA playoffs was the postseason for the Women's National Basketball Association's 2011 season. Four teams from each of the league's two conferences qualified for the playoffs seeded 1 to 4 in a tournament bracket, with the two opening rounds in a best-of-three format, and the final in a best-of-five format. The finals were won by the Minnesota Lynx who defeated the defending Eastern Conference Champion Atlanta Dream.

The Minnesota Lynx was the top overall seed in the tournament, having finished 27–7 in the regular season, the best record in franchise history. The team was appearing in its first playoffs since 2004. Prior to the 2011 playoffs, the Lynx had not won a playoff series in franchise history. This changed in the 2011 playoffs, as the Lynx won their first two playoff series to advance to the WNBA Finals.

The Atlanta Dream had reached the 2010 WNBA Finals, losing in three games to the Seattle Storm. Despite a slow start to the 2011 season, the Dream rebounded to finish with a 20–14 record, good for the third seed in the Eastern Conference. The Dream upset two higher-seeded teams to reach the WNBA finals for the second straight year.

After earning the third seed in the West, the Phoenix Mercury reached their third straight conference finals after upsetting the defending WNBA Champion Seattle Storm in the opening round. They ultimately lost to Minnesota in the conference final.

The Indiana Fever was the top seed in the Eastern Conference, and dispatched the New York Liberty in the opening round. They ultimately fell short to Atlanta in the conference final after WNBA MVP Tamika Catchings tore her plantar fascia in game two of the series, limiting her in the decisive game.

The Seattle Storm earned the West's second seed, and were attempting to repeat as WNBA champions. They took a 1–0 lead in the conference semifinals, but then dropped the next two, losing to Phoenix.

The Connecticut Sun earned the second seed in the East, but were swept in the opening round by the Dream, the eventual East champs.

The San Antonio Silver Stars were the lowest overall seed in the West and the tournament, and drew the unenviable task of playing the Minnesota Lynx. Despite the apparent mismatch, the Silver Stars lost by only one point in game one of the opening round, and won game two. They could not keep up with the Lynx in game three, however, and lost in the opening round.

== Format ==
- The top 4 teams from each conference qualify for the playoffs.
  - All 4 teams are seeded by basis of their standings.
- The series for rounds one and two are in a best-of-three format with Games 1 and 3 on the home court of the team with the higher seed. In previous years, the higher seed would play the first game on the road, then games 2 and (if needed) 3 at home.
- The series for the WNBA Finals is in a best-of-five format with Games 1, 2 and 5 on the home court of the team with the higher seed.

=== Tiebreak procedures ===
==== Two-team tie ====
1. Better record in head-to-head games.
2. Better winning percentage within own conference.
3. Better winning percentage against all teams with .500 or better record at the end of the season.
4. Better point differential in games head-to-head.
5. Coin toss.

==== Three or more-team tie ====
1. Better winning percentage among all head-to-head games involving tied teams.
2. Better winning percentage against teams within conference (for first two rounds of playoffs) or better record against teams in the opposite conference (for Finals).
3. Better winning percentage against all teams with a .500 or better record at the end of the season.
4. Better point differential in games involving tied teams.
5. Coin toss.

== Playoff qualifying ==
=== Eastern Conference ===
Seed	Team	W	L	Tiebreaker	Clinched	
Seed	Team	W	L	Tiebreaker	Playoff berth	Conf. homecourt
1	Indiana Fever	21	13	3–2 vs. CON	August 30	September 7
2	Connecticut Sun	21	13	2–3 vs. IND	August 30	—
3	Atlanta Dream	20	14	—	September 4	—
4	New York Liberty	19	15	—	September 2	—

=== Western Conference ===
Seed	Team	W	L	Tiebreaker	Clinched	
Seed	Team	W	L	Tiebreaker	Playoff berth	Playoffs homecourt
1	Minnesota Lynx	27	7	—	August 20	September 2
2	Seattle Storm	21	13	—	September 2	—
3	Phoenix Mercury	19	15	—	September 3	—
4	San Antonio Silver Stars	18	16	—	September 6	—

== Bracket ==
**Conference semifinals** Best-of-3
E1	**Indiana**	**2**
E4	New York	1
**Eastern Conference**
E2	Connecticut	0
E3	**Atlanta**	**2**
W1	**Minnesota**	**2**
W4	San Antonio	1
**Western Conference**
W2	Seattle	1
W3	**Phoenix**	**2**

**Conference finals** Best-of-3
E1	Indiana	1
E3	**Atlanta**	**2**
W1	**Minnesota**	**2**
W3	Phoenix	0

**WNBA Finals**; Best-of-5
E3	Atlanta	0
W1	**Minnesota**	**3**

- **Bold** – Series winner
- Italics – Team with home-court advantage

== Eastern Conference ==
=== Conference semifinals ===
==== (2) Connecticut Sun vs. (3) Atlanta Dream ====
NBATV

September 16
7:00pm ET

Game 1

**Atlanta Dream** **89**, Connecticut Sun 84
Scoring by quarter: 18–**20**, 21–21, 22–**25**, **28**–18
Pts: Harding (21); Rebs: Lyttle (11); Asts: Harding (5)	Pts: Jones, Montgomery (16); Rebs: McCray (8); Asts: Lawson (4)

Mohegan Sun Arena, Uncasville, CT
Attendance: 7,373
Referees: Michael Price, Clarke Stevens, Maj Forsberg

ESPN2

September 18
3:00pm ET

Game 2

Connecticut Sun 64, **Atlanta Dream** **69**
Scoring by quarter: 11–**16**, **25**–15, **15**–13, 13–**25**
Pts: Jones (15); Rebs: Charles (17); Asts: Montgomery (6)	Pts: de Souza, Harding, Lyttle, McCoughtry (12); Rebs: de Souza (10); Asts: Harding (6)
**Atlanta won the series, 2–0**

Philips Arena, Atlanta, GA
Attendance: 6,887
Referees: Sue Blauch, Daryl Humphrey, Tony Dawkins

Regular-season series

The teams were tied 2–2 in the regular-season series:

July 31, 2011

Report

Atlanta Dream 92, **Connecticut Sun 99**

Mohegan Sun Arena, Uncasville, CT

August 19, 2011

Report

Connecticut Sun 88, **Atlanta Dream 94**

Philips Arena, Atlanta, GA

August 21, 2011

Report

Atlanta Dream 87, **Connecticut Sun 96**

Mohegan Sun Arena, Uncasville, CT

September 6, 2011

Report

Connecticut Sun 74, **Atlanta Dream 85**

Philips Arena, Atlanta, GA

==== (1) Indiana Fever vs. (4) New York Liberty ====
ESPN2

September 15
8:00pm ET

Game 1

New York Liberty 72, **Indiana Fever** **74**
Scoring by quarter: 16–**28**, **18**–16, **24**–18, **14**–12
Pts: Pondexter (18); Rebs: Powell (8); Asts: Pondexter (6)	Pts: Douglas (25); Rebs: Sutton-Brown (7); Asts: Bobbitt, Phillips (3)

Conseco Fieldhouse, Indianapolis, IN
Attendance: 7,608
Referees: Denise Brooks, Lamont Simpson, Roy Gulbeyan

NBATV
MSG

September 17
4:00pm ET

Game 2

Indiana Fever 72, **New York Liberty** **87**
Scoring by quarter: **23**–20, 18–**30**, 9–**12**, 22–**25**
Pts: Douglas (20); Rebs: Catchings (9); Asts: Bobbitt, Phillips (4)	Pts: Powell (19); Rebs: Pondexter, Powell, Vaughn (5); Asts: Pondexter (5)

Prudential Center, Newark, NJ
Attendance: 8,508
Referees: Michael Price, Amy Bonner, Byron Jarret

ESPN2

September 19
8:00pm ET

Game 3

New York Liberty 62, **Indiana Fever** **72**
Scoring by quarter: 17–17, 19–**23**, 12–**14**, 14–**18**
Pts: Powell (19); Rebs: Vaughn (7); Asts: Pondexter (5)	Pts: Douglas (21); Rebs: Catchings (8); Asts: Catchings (4)
**Indiana won the series, 2–1**

Conseco Fieldhouse, Indianapolis, IN
Attendance: 7,368
Referees: Sue Blauch, Tom Mauer, Daryl Humphrey

Regular-season series

The teams were tied 2–2 in the regular-season series:

June 10, 2011

Report

**New York Liberty 81**, Indiana Fever 80

Conseco Fieldhouse, Indianapolis, IN

June 11, 2011

Report

**Indiana Fever 86**, New York Liberty 80

Prudential Center, Newark, NJ

August 13, 2011

Report

New York Liberty 71, **Indiana Fever 82**

Conseco Fieldhouse, Indianapolis, IN

September 9, 2011

Report

Indiana Fever 75, **New York Liberty 83**

Prudential Center, Newark, NJ

=== Conference finals ===
==== (1) Indiana Fever vs. (3) Atlanta Dream ====
ESPN2

September 22
7:00pm ET

Game 1

Atlanta Dream 74, **Indiana Fever** **82**
Scoring by quarter: **24**–21, 16–**21**, **17**–15, 17–**25**
Pts: Harding (17); Rebs: de Souza (13); Asts: Harding (7)	Pts: Smith (25); Rebs: Catchings (13); Asts: Catchings, Douglas, Zellous (3)

Conseco Fieldhouse, Indianapolis, IN
Attendance: 8,253
Referees: Denise Brooks, Amy Bonner, Michael Price

ESPN2

September 25
3:00pm ET

Game 2

Indiana Fever 77, **Atlanta Dream** **94**
Scoring by quarter: 25–**34**, **26**–21, 14–**18**, 12–**21**
Pts: Douglas (25); Rebs: Catchings (9); Asts: Douglas (6)	Pts: Castro Marques (30); Rebs: Lyttle, Price (7); Asts: Harding (7)

Philips Arena, Atlanta, GA
Attendance: 8,052
Referees: Eric Brewton, Cameron Inouye, Roy Gulbeyan

ESPN2

September 27
8:00pm ET

Game 3

**Atlanta Dream** **83**, Indiana Fever 67
Scoring by quarter: **28**–23, 11–**12**, **22**–12, **22**–20
Pts: McCoughtry (26); Rebs: Lyttle (11); Asts: Harding (6)	Pts: Douglas (16); Rebs: Douglas, Sutton-Brown (9); Asts: Catchings, Phillips (3)
**Atlanta won the series, 2–1**

Conseco Fieldhouse, Indianapolis, IN
Attendance: 9,036
Referees: Sue Blauch, Kurt Walker, Lamont Simpson

Regular-season series

The Atlanta Dream won 4–0 in the regular season series:

July 19, 2011

Report

Indiana Fever 74, **Atlanta Dream 84**

Philips Arena, Atlanta, GA

August 27, 2011

Report

**Atlanta Dream 86**, Indiana Fever 80

Conseco Fieldhouse, Indianapolis, IN

August 30, 2011

Report

Indiana Fever 90, **Atlanta Dream 92**

Philips Arena, Atlanta, GA

September 11, 2011

Report

**Atlanta Dream 93**, Indiana Fever 88

Conseco Fieldhouse, Indianapolis, IN

== Western Conference ==
=== Conference semifinals ===
==== (1) Minnesota Lynx vs. (4) San Antonio Silver Stars ====
NBATV

September 16
9:00pm ET

Game 1

San Antonio Silver Stars 65, **Minnesota Lynx** **66**
Scoring by quarter: **16**–11, 19–**21**, 16–**21**, **14**–13
Pts: Adams, Hammon (16); Rebs: Young (9); Asts: Young (6)	Pts: Whalen (20); Rebs: Brunson (14); Asts: Whalen (5)

Target Center, Minneapolis, MN
Attendance: 11,891
Referees: Sue Blauch, Daryl Humphrey, Jeff Smith

ESPN2

September 18
5:00pm ET

Game 2

Minnesota Lynx 75, **San Antonio Silver Stars** **84**
Scoring by quarter: 14–**18**, **23**–22, 13–**24**, **25**–20
Pts: Augustus (24); Rebs: Brunson (16); Asts: Whalen (3)	Pts: Perkins (24); Rebs: Adams, Perkins (6); Asts: Hammon (6)

AT&T Center, San Antonio, TX
Attendance: 7,023
Referees: Denise Brooks, Cameron Inouye, Lamont Simpson

ESPN2

September 20
8:00pm ET

Game 3

San Antonio Silver Stars 67, **Minnesota Lynx** **85**
Scoring by quarter: **19**–18, 17–**26**, 20–**22**, 11–**19**
Pts: Young (17); Rebs: Riley (6); Asts: Hammon (5)	Pts: Augustus (22); Rebs: Brunson (9); Asts: Augustus, McWilliams-Franklin, Moore (4)
**Minnesota won the series, 2–1**

Target Center, Minneapolis, MN
Attendance: 8,734
Referees: Eric Brewton, Roy Gulbeyan, Felicia Grinter

Regular-season series

The Minnesota Lynx won 4–0 in the regular season series:

July 31, 2011

Report

**Minnesota Lynx 70**, San Antonio Silver Stars 69

AT&T Center, San Antonio, TX

August 4, 2011

Report

San Antonio Silver Stars 60, **Minnesota Lynx 62**

Target Center, Minneapolis, MN

August 26, 2011

Report

San Antonio Silver Stars 75, **Minnesota Lynx 85**

Target Center, Minneapolis, MN

August 28, 2011

Report

**Minnesota Lynx 72**, San Antonio Silver Stars 61

AT&T Center, San Antonio, TX

==== (2) Seattle Storm vs. (3) Phoenix Mercury ====
ESPN2

September 15
10:00pm ET

Game 1

Phoenix Mercury 61, **Seattle Storm** **80**
Scoring by quarter: 19–19, 12–**21**, 11–**29**, **19**–11
Pts: Taylor (13); Rebs: Bonner (8); Asts: Johnson, Swanier, Taylor (3)	Pts: Wright (21); Rebs: Cash, Little (11); Asts: Little (4)

KeyArena, Seattle, WA
Attendance: 7,279
Referees: Tom Mauer, Eric Brewton, Cameron Inouye

NBATV

September 17
10:00pm ET

Game 2

Seattle Storm 83, **Phoenix Mercury** **92**
Scoring by quarter: 18–**23**, 22–**28**, **22**–20, 21–21
Pts: Wright (18); Rebs: Cash (5); Asts: Bird (4)	Pts: Dupree (29); Rebs: Dupree (13); Asts: Johnson (9)

US Airways Center, Phoenix, AZ
Attendance: 9,356
Referees: Scott Twardoski, Kurt Walker, Felicia Grinter

ESPN2

September 19
10:00pm ET

Game 3

**Phoenix Mercury** **77**, Seattle Storm 75
Scoring by quarter: 9–**20**, **21**–19, **24**–18, **23**–18
Pts: Dupree (20); Rebs: Taylor (17); Asts: Johnson, Taurasi (3)	Pts: Bird (22); Rebs: Cash (10); Asts: Smith, Wright (4)
**Phoenix won the series, 2–1**

KeyArena, Seattle, WA
Attendance: 8,589
Referees: Clarke Stevens, Michael Price, Amy Bonner

Regular-season series

The Seattle Storm won 3–1 in the regular-season series:

June 4, 2011

Report

Phoenix Mercury 71, **Seattle Storm 78**

KeyArena, Seattle, WA

July 26, 2011

Report

**Seattle Storm 83**, Phoenix Mercury 77

US Airways Center, Phoenix, AZ

August 16, 2011

Report

Seattle Storm 79, **Phoenix Mercury 81**

US Airways Center, Phoenix, AZ

September 9, 2011

Report

Phoenix Mercury 70, **Seattle Storm 85**

KeyArena, Seattle, WA

=== Conference finals ===
==== (1) Minnesota Lynx vs. (3) Phoenix Mercury ====
ESPN2

September 22
9:00pm ET

Game 1

Phoenix Mercury 67, **Minnesota Lynx** **95**
Scoring by quarter: 11–**28**, **25**–19, 19–**27**, 12–**21**
Pts: Taurasi (22); Rebs: Bonner (8); Asts: Johnson (4)	Pts: Augustus (21); Rebs: Brunson (13); Asts: Augustus (7)

Target Center, Minneapolis, MN
Attendance: 8,912
Referees: Sue Blauch, Lamont Simpson, Tom Mauer

ESPN2

September 25
5:00pm ET

Game 2

**Minnesota Lynx** **103**, Phoenix Mercury 86
Scoring by quarter: **24**–20, 19–**25**, **27**–20, **33**–21
Pts: McWilliams-Franklin, Moore (21); Rebs: Brunson (9); Asts: McWilliams-Franklin (7)	Pts: Bonner, Taurasi (22); Rebs: Dupree (11); Asts: Johnson (6)
**Minnesota won the series, 2–0**

US Airways Center, Phoenix, AZ
Attendance: 8,617
Referees: Michael Price, Daryl Humphrey, Denise Brooks

Regular-season series

The Minnesota Lynx won 3–2 in the regular season series:

July 13, 2011

Report

**Phoenix Mercury 112**, Minnesota Lynx 105

Target Center, Minneapolis, MN

July 20, 2011

Report

**Minnesota Lynx** **106**, Phoenix Mercury 98

US Airways Center, Phoenix, AZ

August 2, 2011

Report

Phoenix Mercury 73, **Minnesota Lynx** **90**

Target Center, Minneapolis, MN

August 9, 2011

Report

Minnesota Lynx 80, **Phoenix Mercury** **85**

US Airways Center, Phoenix, AZ

September 11, 2011

Report

**Minnesota Lynx** **96**, Phoenix Mercury 90

US Airways Center, Phoenix, AZ

== WNBA Finals ==
=== Minnesota Lynx vs. Atlanta Dream ===
ESPN

October 2
8:30pm ET

Game 1

Atlanta Dream 74, **Minnesota Lynx** **88**
Scoring by quarter: **18**–14, 21–**22**, 23–**26**, 12–**26**
Pts: McCoughtry (33); Rebs: Bales (9); Asts: Harding (5)	Pts: Brunson (26); Rebs: Brunson (11); Asts: Augustus (7)

Target Center, Minneapolis, MN
Attendance: 15,258
Referees: Eric Brewton, Denise Brooks, Roy Gulbeyan

ESPN2

October 5
8:00 PM ET

Game 2

Atlanta Dream 95, **Minnesota Lynx** **101**
Scoring by quarter: **28**–22, **30**–28, 16–**19**, 21–**32**
Pts: McCoughtry (38); Rebs: de Souza (10); Asts: Harding (7)	Pts: Augustus (36); Rebs: Augustus (8); Asts: Whalen (4)

Target Center, Minneapolis, MN
Attendance: 15,124
Referees: Sue Blauch, Kurt Walker, Lamont Simpson

ESPN2

October 7
8:00pm ET

Game 3

**Minnesota Lynx** **73**, Atlanta Dream 67
Scoring by quarter: 17–**20**, 16–**17**, **19**–8, 21–**22**
Pts: Augustus (16); Rebs: Brunson (9); Asts: Augustus, McWilliams-Franklin (4)	Pts: McCoughtry (22); Rebs: de Souza (15); Asts: Harding (7)
**Minnesota won the series, 3–0**

Philips Arena, Atlanta, GA
Attendance: 11,543
Referees: Michael Price, Daryl Humphrey, Cameron Inouye

Regular-season series

The Minnesota Lynx won the season series 2-0:

June 17, 2011

Report

Atlanta Dream 85, **Minnesota Lynx 96**

Target Center, Minneapolis, MN

June 19, 2011

Report

**Minnesota Lynx 77**, Atlanta Dream 64

Philips Arena, Atlanta, GA
