= Sandora Irvin =

American basketball player (born 1982)

Personal information
- Born: February 23, 1982 (age 44) Fort Lauderdale, Florida, U.S.
- Listed height: 6 ft 3 in (1.91 m)
- Listed weight: 185 lb (84 kg)

Career information
- High school: Fort Lauderdale
- College: TCU (2001–2005)
- WNBA draft: 2005: 1st round, 3rd overall pick
- Drafted by: Phoenix Mercury
- Playing career: 2005–present
- Position: Forward

Career history
- 2005–2006: Phoenix Mercury
- 2007–2008: San Antonio Silver Stars
- 2010: Chicago Sky
- 2011: Atlanta Dream

Career highlights
- Kodak All-American (2005); All-American – USBWA (2005); First-team All-American – AP (2005); CUSA Player of the Year (2005); 2× CUSA Tournament MVP (2003, 2005); 2× First-team All-CUSA (2004, 2005); 3× CUSA Defensive Player of the Year (2003–2005); CUSA All-Freshman Team (2002)
- Stats at Basketball Reference

Sandora Lavett Irvin (born February 23, 1982) is an American professional basketball player for the Women's National Basketball Association (WNBA). She was waived by the San Antonio Silver Stars in 2009.

In her WNBA career, Irvin has scored 91 points, and has collected 100 rebounds, 14 assists, 10 steals, and 26 blocks.

== Early life ==
Irvin is the daughter of Daughn Irvin and Angela Hollis and the niece of former Dallas Cowboys star wide receiver, Michael Irvin.

In Irvin's senior season in college she averaged 19.9 points and 11.9 points per game and tallied 150 blocked shots, two shy of tying the NCAA's single-season record at that time. Irvin previously held the NCAA record for career blocked shots, with 480, when she graduated in 2005. She broke the old mark of 428 set in 1991. Her record was surpassed by Louella Tomlinson of Saint Mary's in 2010, who finished her career with 663 blocks.

As a senior Irvin was also named to the AP All-America first team and selected as a Kodak All-American. She also earned USBWA All-American and Conference USA Player of the Year honors. Irvin was named Conference USA Defensive Player of the Year for the third consecutive season. She ended her junior season with 15 consecutive double-doubles She set the TCU single-season records for points (504), rebounds (366) and field goals made (195) as a junior.

== Professional career ==
=== Phoenix Mercury ===
On April 16, 2005, Irvin was drafted by the Phoenix Mercury in the first round (No. 3 overall) of the 2005 WNBA Draft. In her rookie season, Irvin played in 12 regular season games averaging 3.7 points, 2.8 rebounds, 0.50 blocks, 0.42 steals and 10.2 minutes per game.

During the 2006 WNBA season, Irvin appeared in 7 regular season games for the Mercury, averaging 1.0 points and 1.1 rebounds per game.

=== San Antonio Silver Stars ===
After two seasons with the Mercury, Irvin was traded by Phoenix to the San Antonio Silver Stars in exchange for a second round 2008 draft pick. During the 2007 WNBA season, Irvin appeared in 23 games for the Silver Stars averaging 1.2 points, 1.7 rebounds, 0.40 blocks, 0.1 steals and 5.6 minutes per game. She was waived by the San Antonio Silver Stars on May 12, 2009.

=== Chicago Sky ===
After spending some time on the free agent market, she signed a training camp contract with the Chicago Sky. She was later named to the team. During her run with the Sky, she appeared in 18 games. Started in one of the games. Sandora averaged 1.9 points, 1.4 rebounds, 0.33 blocks, 0.11 steals and 7.6 minutes per game. She was waived by the Chicago Sky on July 22, 2010.

== International career ==
Irvin played overseas for Club USP-CEU MMT Estudiantes (Madrid, Spain) in the First Division of the Liga Feminina (LF). In 14 games, Irvin has averaged 13.5 points, 9.9 rebounds, 1.4 assists and 1.3 blocks per game. She is among the Spanish LF overall league leaders in points per game (15th), rebounds per game (third) and blocks per game (third).

On July 6, 2007 Irvin officially signed with Puig d’en Valls, a team in Spain which completed its sixth straight season in the Liga Femenina, Her statistics starting from January 2007, when she landed in Madrid's Estudiantes team, are notable: 13.5 points, 10 rebounds and 2 blocks per game, twice selected game MVP.

== Career statistics ==
Legend
GP	Games played	GS	Games started	MPG	Minutes per game	RPG	Rebounds per game
APG	Assists per game	SPG	Steals per game	BPG	Blocks per game	PPG	Points per game
TO	Turnovers per game	FG%	Field-goal percentage	3P%	3-point field-goal percentage	FT%	Free-throw percentage
**Bold**	Career best	°	League leader

=== WNBA ===
==== Regular season ====
WNBA regular season statistics
Year	Team	GP	GS	MPG	FG%	3P%	FT%	RPG	APG	SPG	BPG	TO	PPG
2005	Phoenix	12	0	**10.2**	31.8	**50.0**	**80.0**	**2.8**	**0.4**	**0.4**	0.5	**0.2**	**3.7**
2006	Phoenix	7	0	5.4	15.4	0.0	60.0	1.4	0.1	0.3	**1.1**	0.4	1.0
2007	San Antonio	23	0	5.6	31.0	0.0	50.0	1.7	0.3	0.1	0.4	0.5	1.2
2008	San Antonio	21	0	5.5	32.1	25.0	63.6	1.7	0.1	0.1	0.2	0.3	1.2
2009	Did not play (waived)												
2010	Chicago	18	**1**	7.6	**46.7**	14.3	66.7	1.4	0.2	0.1	0.3	0.6	1.9
2011	Atlanta	**30**	**1**	8.3	33.9	0.0	70.0	2.5	**0.5**	0.2	0.5	0.5	1.8
**Career**	6 years, 4 teams	111	2	7.1	33.3	19.4	69.4	2.0	0.3	0.2	0.5	0.4	1.7

=== Playoffs ===
WNBA playoffs statistics
Year	Team	GP	GS	MPG	FG%	3P%	FT%	RPG	APG	SPG	BPG	TO	PPG
2007	San Antonio	3	0	**3.0**	**100.0**	—	—	0.3	0.0	0.0	0.3	0.3	0.7
2008	San Antonio	3	0	1.3	33.3	—	—	0.3	**0.3**	0.0	0.3	**0.0**	0.7
2011	Atlanta	3	0	2.7	**100.0**	**100.0**	—	**0.7**	0.0	0.0	0.3	**0.0**	**1.0**
**Career**	3 years, 2 teams	9	0	2.3	60.0	100.0	0.0	0.4	0.1	0.0	0.3	0.1	0.8

=== College ===
NCAA statistics
Year	Team	GP	Points	FG%	3P%	FT%	RPG	APG	SPG	BPG	PPG
2001–02	TCU	31	335	42.6	**57.1**	63.2	9.5	1.2	1.6	2.7	10.8
2002–03	TCU	**33**	396	41.9	20.0	69.2	9.7	1.1	1.2	3.9	12.0
2003–04	TCU	30	504	**51.0**	47.1	65.4	**12.2**	1.5	1.8	3.9	16.8
2004–05	TCU	**33**	**657**	45.7	38.1	**73.3**	11.8	**2.1**	**2.5**	**4.5**	**19.9**
**Career**		127	1892	45.6	39.2	68.4	10.8	1.5	1.8	3.8	14.9

== Off the court ==
In 2007 Irvin joined her alma mater's, Texas Christian University, women's basketball staff as Director of Operations.
