= Alison Bales =

American basketball player (born 1985)

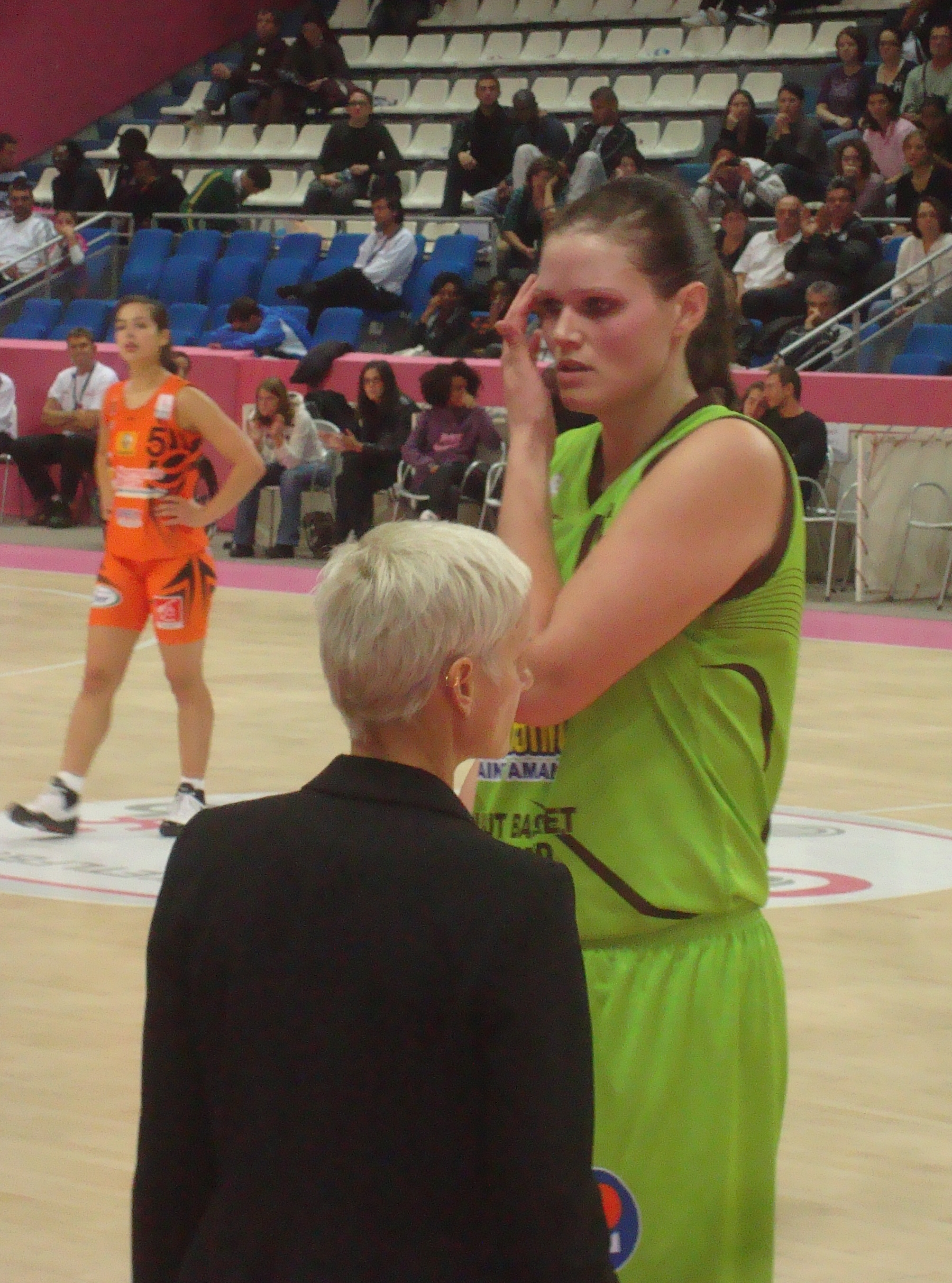

Personal information
- Born: April 4, 1985 (age 41) Indianapolis, Indiana, U.S.
- Listed height: 6 ft 7 in (2.01 m)
- Listed weight: 218 lb (99 kg)

Career information
- High school: Beavercreek (Beavercreek, Ohio)
- College: Duke (2003–2007)
- WNBA draft: 2007: 1st round, 9th overall pick
- Drafted by: Indiana Fever
- Playing career: 2007–2012
- Position: Center
- Number: 33

Career history
- 2007–2008: Indiana Fever
- 2008 2010–2011: Atlanta Dream

Career highlights
- Senior CLASS Award (2007); All-American – USBWA (2007); Third-team All-American – AP (2007); First-team All-ACC (2007); 2× ACC All-Defensive Team (2005, 2007); McDonald's All-American (2003)
- Stats at Basketball Reference

Alison Marie Bales (born April 4, 1985) is an American former professional basketball player of the Women's National Basketball Association (WNBA).

== High school ==
At the age of five, her family moved from Indianapolis, Indiana, where she was born, to the Dayton suburb of Beavercreek, Ohio; she played high school basketball for Beavercreek High School. Bales was named a WBCA All-American. She participated in the 2003 WBCA High School All-America Game, where she scored three points.

== College ==
After her senior year, she committed to Duke University to play for the Duke Blue Devils women's basketball team. At 6' 7" she played center for Duke, and later became the all-time shot block leader at Duke and 3rd all-time in NCAA history. In the 2006 NCAA women's tournament, Bales set a Women's Tournament record by blocking 30 shots in six games (Duke lost to Atlantic Coast Conference rival Maryland in the championship game). This would stand as a record until it was broken by Baylor's Brittney Griner in 2010. Bales graduated from Duke with a double major in cultural anthropology and biology.

== Career statistics ==
Legend
GP	Games played	GS	Games started	MPG	Minutes per game	RPG	Rebounds per game
APG	Assists per game	SPG	Steals per game	BPG	Blocks per game	PPG	Points per game
TO	Turnovers per game	FG%	Field-goal percentage	3P%	3-point field-goal percentage	FT%	Free-throw percentage
**Bold**	Career best	°	League leader

=== WNBA ===
==== Regular season ====
Year	Team	GP	GS	MPG	FG%	3P%	FT%	RPG	APG	SPG	BPG	TO	PPG
2007	Indiana	17	0	9.9	**57.1**	0.0	**87.5**	2.6	0.1	0.2	0.8	0.4	3.2
2008	Indiana	14	0	9.0	38.9	40.0	77.8	1.6	0.1	0.4	1.0	**0.2**	2.6
2008	Atlanta	17	9	**22.9**	40.5	33.3	67.7	**6.0**	0.6	**0.9**	**1.7**	0.6	4.8
2009	Did not play (waived)												
2010	Atlanta	**34**	3	15.6	43.3	**41.7**	79.6	3.8	0.8	0.7	1.1	0.7	3.9
2011	Atlanta	**34**	**15**	20.2	48.6	35.3	75.0	4.7	**1.2**	0.4	1.6	0.5	**5.0**
Career	5 years, 2 teams	116	27	16.4	45.8	37.8	76.1	3.9	0.7	0.5	1.3	0.5	4.1

==== Playoffs ====
Year	Team	GP	GS	MPG	FG%	3P%	FT%	RPG	APG	SPG	BPG	TO	PPG
2007	Indiana	4	0	4.3	0.0	0.0	0.0	0.5	0.3	0.0	0.0	**0.3**	0.0
2010	Atlanta	7	0	7.3	**62.5**	0.0	0.0	1.7	0.4	**0.3**	**1.0**	**0.3**	1.4
2011	Atlanta	**8**	0	**16.0**	38.5	**42.9**	**50.0**	**5.0**	**0.9**	**0.3**	0.8	1.3	**3.0**
Career	5 years, 2 teams	19	0	10.3	39.5	37.5	16.7	2.8	0.6	0.2	0.7	0.7	1.8

=== College ===
Legend
GP	Games played	GS	Games started	MPG	Minutes per game
FG%	Field goal percentage	3P%	3-point field goal percentage	FT%	Free throw percentage
RPG	Rebounds per game	APG	Assists per game	SPG	Steals per game
BPG	Blocks per game	PPG	Points per game	**Bold**	Career high

Year	Team	GP	Points	FG%	3P%	FT%	RPG	APG	SPG	BPG	PPG
2003-04	Duke	24	78	55.8	-	69.0	2.8	0.5	0.3	1.2	3.3
2004-05	Duke	**36**	276	48.0	**100.0**	67.0	6.6	1.9	0.5	3.7	7.7
2005-06	Duke	35	318	**52.6**	-	**78.6**	6.7	1.1	**1.2**	3.4	9.1
2006-07	Duke	34	**403**	46.4	50.0	74.2	**7.8**	**2.0**	1.1	**4.4**	**11.9**
Career	Duke	129	1075	49.1	66.7	73.4	6.2	1.5	0.8	3.4	8.3

== WNBA career ==
On her birthday, Bales was drafted No. 9 overall by the Indiana Fever in the 2007 WNBA draft. After a season and a half with Indiana, Bales was traded to the Atlanta Dream for Kristen Mann on July 4, 2008. She would complete the season with Atlanta, and then be traded to the Phoenix Mercury on January 21, 2009, for the 18th pick in the 2009 WNBA draft. Bales was waived by the Phoenix Mercury on June 4, 2009. After another season overseas, Bales was picked back up by the Atlanta Dream.

Over the course of her WNBA career, Bales averaged 3.8 points per game and 4.0 rebounds per game.

On April 10, 2012, Bales announced her retirement to attend medical school.

== Overseas career ==
Bales also played for the Dynamo Moscow professional basketball club in Russia during the winter of 2007–2008. She is currently playing in the offseason for L Union Jainaut Basket Saint Amon in France.

She played for Turkey's Samsun during the 2008–09 off-season.

== Post basketball career ==
After retiring from her basketball career, she attended Boonshoft School of Medicine, Wright State University starting in May 2013. After graduating and obtaining her MD, she attended the General Surgery Residency program at Indiana University, and completed a surgical fellowship in Trauma and Critical Care Surgery.
