= Izi Castro Marques =

Brazilian basketball player (born 1982)

Personal information
- Born: March 13, 1982 (age 44) São Luís, Maranhão, Brazil
- Listed height: 6 ft 0 in (1.83 m)
- Listed weight: 140 lb (64 kg)

Career information
- Playing career: 2002–2017
- Position: Shooting guard / small forward

Career history
- 2002: Miami Sol
- 2002–2003: Aix Basket
- 2003–2007: Phoenix Mercury
- 2003–2004: Perfumerias Avenidas
- 2004–2005: B.C. Euras Ekaterinburg
- 2005–2006: USK Praha
- 2005–2007: Seattle Storm
- 2006–2007: TTT Riga
- 2007–2008: Hondarribia-Irun
- 2008: Ourinhos
- 2008–2011: Atlanta Dream
- 2008–2009: Villeneuve d'Ascq
- 2008–2009: Spartak Moscow
- 2009: Extrugasa Vilagarcia
- 2009–2010: Wisła Can Pack Kraków
- 2010–2011: Beşiktaş JK
- 2011–2013: Maranhao Basquete
- 2012: Washington Mystics
- 2013: Connecticut Sun
- 2015–2017: Sampaio Basquete

Career highlights
- Latvian National League champion (2007)
- Stats at WNBA.com
- Stats at Basketball Reference
Medals
Women's basketball
Representing Brazil
Pan American Games
Bronze medal – third place	2011 Guadalajara	Team

Iziane "Izi" Castro Marques (born March 13, 1982) is a retired Brazilian professional basketball player. Castro Marques played for the Brazil national team and played for the Miami Sol, Phoenix Mercury, Seattle Storm, Atlanta Dream, Washington Mystics, and Connecticut Sun of the Women's National Basketball Association (WNBA). Castro Marques also played overseas in France, Brazil, Spain, Latvia, Turkey, Poland, and Russia. Following her retirement, Castro Marques became the technical director of Sampaio Basquete of the Brazilian Women's Basketball League.

== WNBA career ==
After playing in the Paulista League in Brazil for BCN Osasco in 2001 and leading the league in scoring, Castro Marques was invited to the Miami Sol's training camp. After training camp, she would make the final cut for team and signed with the Sol. In her rookie season, Castro Marques was the second-youngest player in the WNBA at the time (20 years, 1 month, 12 days).

At the end of 2002 season, the Miami Sol folded and Castro Marques would sign with the Phoenix Mercury in 2003. The Mercury would waive Castro Marques at the end of the season. Castro Marques chose not to play in the WNBA in 2004 to focus on the Brazilian national team for the Summer Olympics that year.

In 2005, Castro Marques returned to the WNBA and signed with the Seattle Storm, becoming a starter for the first time in her career. In the early part of the 2006 season, her erratic play got her benched in favor of rookie Barbara Turner, but Castro Marques came back strong after eight games in reserve, and never relinquished the starting job during that season. In the 2007 season, Castro Marques started in all 34 games while averaging 12.3 ppg, making it the first time she averaged double-digits in scoring. Castro Marques had also gained some playoff experience for the first time in her career in her three-year stint with the Storm.

On February 6, 2008, Castro Marques was traded by Seattle to the Atlanta Dream along with the Storm's first round pick in exchange for Roneeka Hodges and the fourth overall pick in the 2008 draft. In her four-year stint with the Atlanta Dream from 2008 to 2011, she played with fellow Brazilian Érika de Souza, whom she played with in high school back in Brazil. Castro Marques had the best years of her career in Atlanta, especially in the 2010 season where she averaged a career-high 16.9 ppg and had also helped Atlanta reach the WNBA Finals twice in 2010 and 2011.

In 2012, Castro Marques sat out the first half of the season to focus on the Brazilian National Team for the Summer Olympics. Castro Marques signed with the Washington Mystics halfway through the season and played 11 games.

In 2013, Castro Marques signed with the Connecticut Sun, it would be her final year playing in the WNBA.

== Overseas career ==
During her basketball career, Castro Marques has played overseas on many occasions. In the 2002-03 off-season, Castro Marques played in France for Aix Basket. In the 2003-04 off-season, Castro Marques played in Spain for Perfumerias Avenidas. In the 2004-05 off-season, Castro Marques played in Russia for B.C. Euras Ekaterinburg. In the 2005-06 off-season Castro Marques played in Czech Republic for USK Praha. In the 2006-07 off-season, Castro Marques played for TTT Riga of the Euroleague. In the 2007-08 off-season, Castro Marques played for Hondarribia-Irun in Spain and for Ourinhos in Brazil. During the 2008-09 WNBA off-season, Castro Marques played for Villeneuve d'Ascq in France, Extragusa Vilagarcia in the Spanish League and Spartak Moscow in Russia. In the 2009-10 off-season, Castro Marques signed a contract with Wisła Can Pack Kraków in Poland. In the 2010-11 off-season, Castro Marques played for Beşiktaş JK in Turkey. From 2011 to 2013, Castro Marques played a couple off-seasons in Brazil for her hometown team Maranhao Basquete. In 2015–16, Castro Marques played for Sampaio Basquete in Brazil Castro Marques continued to play for Sampaio Basquete in 2016-17 before retiring from professional basketball.

== International competitions ==
Her national team has finished fourth in two consecutive international competitions, the 2004 Summer Olympics and the 2006 FIBA World Championship for Women, which Brazil hosted. Star of the squad, she was not included in the roster for the 2008 Summer Olympics due to her refusal to enter a quarterfinal game in overtime after a verbal altercation with her coach during the FIBA World Olympic Qualifying Tournament for Women 2008 in Spain. During preparation for the 2012 Summer Olympics, Castro Marques was again cut from the Olympic team due to "an act of indiscipline", namely bringing her boyfriend to concentration.

She was a member of the team which competed for Brazil at the 2011 Pan American Games, winning a bronze medal.

Castro Marques also played for Brazil in the 2016 Summer Olympics as the team captain. It would be her last olympics before retiring from the team.

== WNBA career statistics ==
Legend
GP	Games played	GS	Games started	MPG	Minutes per game	RPG	Rebounds per game
APG	Assists per game	SPG	Steals per game	BPG	Blocks per game	PPG	Points per game
TO	Turnovers per game	FG%	Field-goal percentage	3P%	3-point field-goal percentage	FT%	Free-throw percentage
**Bold**	Career best	°	League leader

=== Regular season ===
Year	Team	GP	GS	MPG	FG%	3P%	FT%	RPG	APG	SPG	BPG	TO	PPG
2002	Miami	19	1	9.6	.333	.059	.680	0.9	0.4	0.3	0.0	0.9	3.5
2003	Phoenix	16	0	11.1	.352	.296	.611	0.8	0.6	0.3	0.0	0.6	4.3
2005	Seattle	33	32	26.6	.384	.333	.808	**2.9**	1.5	0.5	0.1	1.7	8.2
2006	Seattle	**34**	26	19.3	**.469**	**.385**	.661	2.1	1.4	0.6	0.0	1.4	7.2
2007	Seattle	**34**	**34**	28.3	.420	**.385**	.802	2.0	**2.8**	**1.0**	0.1	1.8	12.3
2008	Atlanta	29	20	23.1	.353	.309	**.814**	2.2	1.8	0.9	**0.2**	1.9	9.3
2009	Atlanta	**34**	33	26.9	.413	.345	.780	2.2	2.0	**1.0**	0.0	2.4	14.4
2010	Atlanta	**34**	**34**	**28.9**	.444	.295	.659	1.7	2.6	0.8	0.0	2.7	**16.9**
2011	Atlanta	**34**	14	19.8	.360	.213	.620	**2.9**	1.7	0.3	0.1	1.5	7.6
2012	Washington	11	0	12.0	.264	.167	.714	**2.9**	0.7	0.2	0.0	**0.7**	3.1
2013	Connecticut	28	9	15.7	.352	.326	.725	1.7	1.0	0.4	0.1	1.3	6.0
Career	11 years, 6 teams	306	203	21.8	.399	.319	.726	2.0	1.7	0.7	0.0	1.8	9.4

=== Postseason ===
Year	Team	GP	GS	MPG	FG%	3P%	FT%	RPG	APG	SPG	BPG	TO	PPG
2005	Seattle	3	3	28.7	.333	.167	**1.000**	1.0	1.3	**0.6**	0.0	2.6	5.7
2006	Seattle	3	3	29.3	.389	.222	.867	2.7	2.7	**0.6**	0.3	2.0	9.7
2007	Seattle	2	2	25.5	.400	.308	.000	2.0	2.0	0.0	**0.5**	2.0	10.0
2009	Atlanta	2	2	25.5	**.500**	.500	.706	1.5	**4.5**	0.0	0.0	2.0	16.0
2010	Atlanta	7	**7**	**32.1**	.471	.407	.478	2.4	2.0	0.1	0.1	2.0	**16.9**
2011	Atlanta	**8**	3	25.6	.453	**.536**	.444	**4.0**	1.0	**0.6**	0.0	**0.8**	13.6
Career	6 years, 2 teams	25	20	28.2	.446	.407	.623	2.9	2.0	0.4	0.1	1.7	13.0
