= Érika de Souza =

Brazilian basketball player (born 1982)

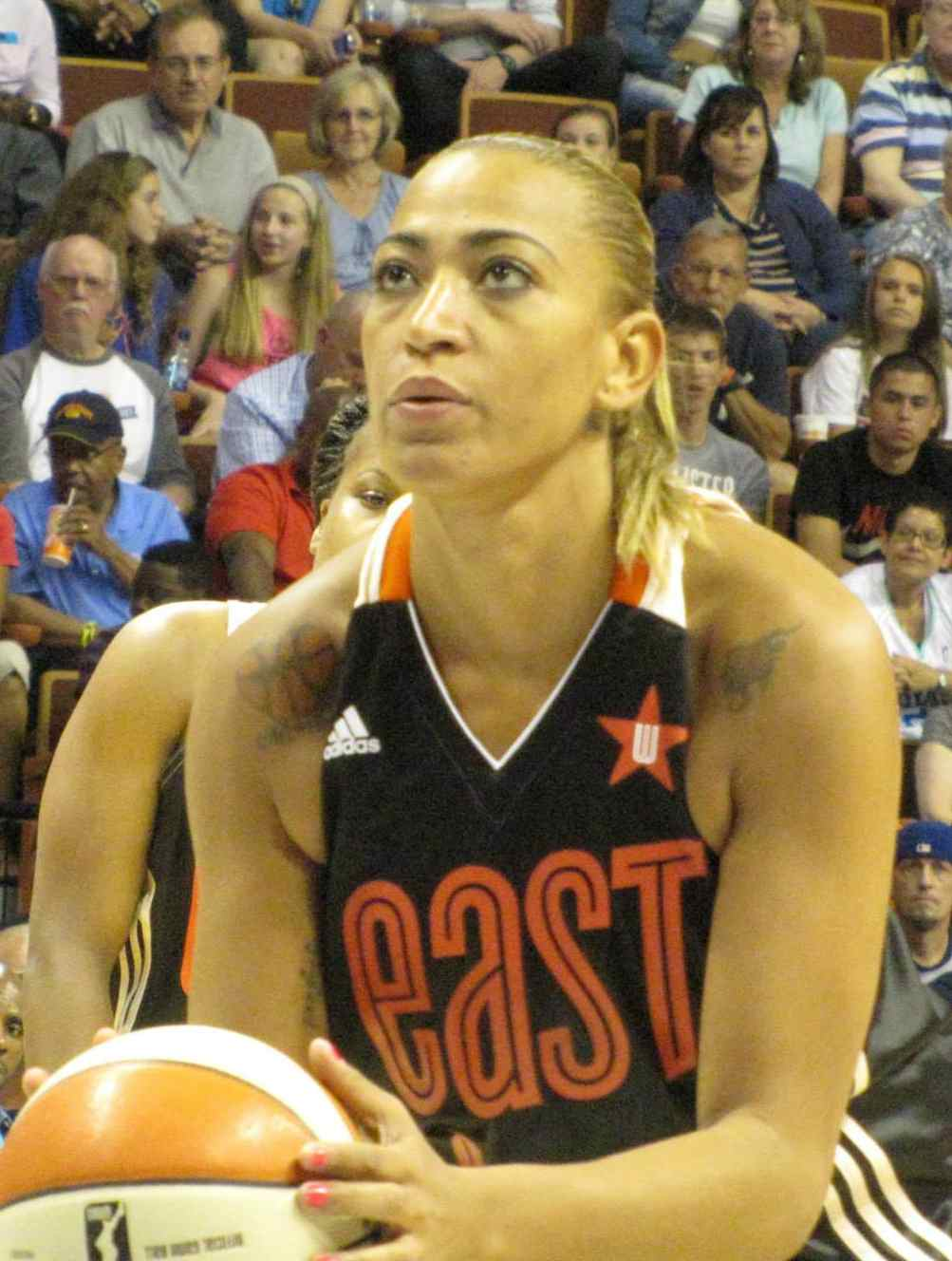

No. 14 – BC Castors Braine
- Position: Center
- League: EuroLeague Women

Personal information
- Born: 9 March 1982 (age 44) Rio de Janeiro, Brazil
- Listed height: 6 ft 5 in (1.96 m)
- Listed weight: 190 lb (86 kg)

Career information
- Playing career: 2002–present

Career history
- 2002: Los Angeles Sparks
- 2002–2003: MiZo Pécs
- 2003–2006: UB-Barça
- 2006–2010: Ros Casares Valencia
- 2007: Connecticut Sun
- 2008–2015: Atlanta Dream
- 2010–2012: Perfumerías Avenida
- 2013–2014: Sport Recife
- 2014–2016: Uninassau/Americana
- 2015: Adana ASKİ
- 2015–2016: Chicago Sky
- 2016: Flamengo Basketball
- 2016–2019: Perfumerías Avenida
- 2017: San Antonio Stars
- 2019–2020: Uninassau Basquette
- 2020–present: BC Castors Braine

Career highlights
- WNBA champion (2002); EuroLeague champion (2011); 3× WNBA All-Star (2009, 2013, 2014); WNBA All-Defensive Second Team (2013); Hungarian National League champion (2003); 8× Spanish National League champion (2005, 2007–2011, 2017, 2018); 7× Queen's Cup winner (2007–2010, 2012, 2017–2018)
- Stats at WNBA.com
- Stats at Basketball Reference
Medals
Women's basketball
Representing Brazil
FIBA AmeriCup
Gold medal – first place	2001 São Luís
Gold medal – first place	2003 Culiacán
Gold medal – first place	2011 Neiva
Gold medal – first place	2023 León
Silver medal – second place	2005 Hato Mayor
Bronze medal – third place	2019 Puerto Rico
Bronze medal – third place	2021 San Juan
Pan American Games
Gold medal – first place	2019 Lima	Team
Gold medal – first place	2023 Santiago	Team
Bronze medal – third place	2011 Guadalajara	Team

Érika Cristina de Souza (born 9 March 1982) is a Brazilian professional basketball player for BC Castors Braine of the EuroLeague.

== Biography ==
De Souza was born in Rio de Janeiro, Brazil and grew up in poverty with a single mother and three siblings. She began playing basketball at the age of 16 after being encouraged by her mother to try the sport, she also played volleyball, handball, and ran track. Her basketball abilities led to a roster spot on a team from Osasco, where she met future Atlanta Dream teammate Izi Castro Marques.

After winning her first WNBA championship in 2002, de Souza used the money she made during the season to remodel her mother's home. De Souza purchased a bakery in her hometown of Rio de Janeiro for her family to open a business. De Souza's mother died in 2008 following a long battle with cancer.

De Souza is compared to Dennis Rodman in her country due to the fact that they are both basketball players with multiple tattoos, piercings and dyed hair.

== WNBA career ==
After her first year of playing professional basketball in Spain, de Souza signed with the Los Angeles Sparks in 2002 and would play alongside Lisa Leslie. During the 2002 season, de Souza was a reserve on the Sparks's roster and had very limited playing time but would win her first WNBA championship with the team despite not playing in the finals. De Souza opted to leave the Sparks and play the next five years overseas in Spain and Hungary for higher paying salaries before signing with another WNBA team.

In 2007, de Souza signed with the Connecticut Sun. During the 2007 season with the Sun, de Souza played 34 games with 2 starts.

In 2008, de Souza joined the newly formed Atlanta Dream after being selected in the expansion draft. During the 2008 season, de Souza averaged 9.3 ppg and a career-high 1.7 bpg on the Dream, but after playing 12 games she fractured her lower leg, causing her to miss the rest of the season. The Dream would finish a franchise worst 4–30. Prior to her injury, de Souza set the WNBA record for most rebounds in a quarter in a regular season game loss to the Detroit Shock, where she grabbed 11 of her 18 rebounds in the second quarter.

In the 2009 season, de Souza had a breakout year, averaging 11.8 ppg, 9.1 rpg and 1.2 bpg, being voted as a WNBA all-star for the first time. She played and started in all 34 games and established herself as a low-post scorer, tenacious rebounder and rim-protector. Despite the language barrier at the time, de Souza was still able to fit in with the Dream's style of play and develop a chemistry with her teammates and with the help of fellow Brazilian teammate Izi Castro Marques, she was able to communicate with the other teammates and coaching staff in order to understand English better. With a healthy de Souza, the Dream finished 18–16; the biggest single-season turn around in WNBA league history after their 4–30 season the year before. The Dream made it to the playoffs for the first time in franchise history but were eliminated in the first round.

In the 2010 season, de Souza averaged 12.4 ppg and 8.3 rpg and grabbed a career-high 20 rebounds in a regular season game against the Minnesota Lynx. De Souza and the Atlanta Dream were championship contenders, with a supporting cast of all-star power forward Sancho Lyttle, rising star Angel McCoughtry and Izi Castro Marques at starting shooting guard averaging a career-high in scoring, the Atlanta Dream made it to the WNBA finals, but were swept by the Seattle Storm.

The Dream would make it back to the WNBA finals once again the following year, but were swept by the Minnesota Lynx. De Souza had averaged a double-double in points and rebounds during the 2011 playoffs.

In the 2013 season, de Souza was voted as a WNBA all-star for the second time in her career, averaging 12.9 ppg, 9.9 rpg, and tied her career-high of 1.7 bpg. De Souza was also named to the WNBA All-Defensive Second team. The Dream made it to the WNBA finals for the third time in four years, making it de Souza's fourth career WNBA Finals appearance, but would lose yet again to the Minnesota Lynx. De Souza would once again average a double-double in points and rebounds during the 2013 playoffs.

In 2014, de Souza re-signed with the Dream and would once again be voted as a WNBA all-star, averaging a career-high 13.8 ppg along with 8.7 rpg and 1.4 bpg. During the regular season, de Souza tied her career-high of 27 points along with 11 rebounds in a win against the Los Angeles Sparks. The Dream finished first place in the Eastern Conference, but were upset in the first round 2–1 to the Chicago Sky.

Midway through the 2015 season on 27 July, de Souza was traded from the Dream to the Chicago Sky as part of a three-team trade deal that sent Sylvia Fowles to the Minnesota Lynx and Damiris Dantas and Reshanda Gray to the Dream. Since joining the Sky, de Souza would have a smaller role on the team as she played 17 games with 15 starts and averaged 5.5 ppg and 5.5 rpg. The Sky would make it to the playoffs and lost 2–1 in the first round.

In 2016, de Souza re-signed with the Sky and became a role player on the team's roster, playing 31 games with 18 starts while averaging 5.8 ppg and 5.2 rpg. The Sky made it to the playoffs with an 18–16 record and with the WNBA's new playoff format in effect, the Sky were the number 4 seed in the league with a bye to the second round. In the second round elimination game, the Sky defeated the Atlanta Dream to advance to the semifinals (the last round before the WNBA finals). In the semifinals, the Sky were defeated 3–1 by the Los Angeles Sparks who won the championship that year.

On 1 February 2017, de Souza signed with the San Antonio Stars. After 27 games played, de Souza suffered a lower right leg bone bruise during team practice and was waived by the Stars to do her physical therapy in Brazil.

== Overseas career ==
In 2001, de Souza played her first year of professional basketball in Spain. During the 2002–03 WNBA off-season, de Souza played in Hungary for MiZo Pécs. From 2003 to 2006, de Souza played in Spain once again for UB-Barça, she won the 2005–06 MVP of the Spanish women's league while playing with UB-Barça. From 2006 to 2010, de Souza played four off-seasons in Spain again for Ros Casares Valencia. From 2010 to 2012, de Souza played two off-seasons for Perfumerías Avenida Salamanca in Spain. In the 2013–14 off-season, de Souza played in her home country for Sport Recife, a Brazilian sports club. In the 2014–15 off-season played in Brazil once again for Uninassau/Americana. De Souza spent the first portion of the 2015–16 off-season in Turkey playing for Adana ASKİ then returned to Brazil to play for Uninassau/Americana once again for the remainder of the off-season. As of August 2016, de Souza signed a 1-month contract with Flamengo Basketball, another Brazilian sports club for the 2016–17 off-season. In November 2016, de Souza returned to Perfumerías Avenida for the remainder of the off-season and won a championship with the team. In 2017, de Souza re-signed with Perfumerías Avenida for the 2017–18 off-season. In 2018–19, de Souza returned to Perfumerías Avenida Salamanca. In 2019, de Souza returned home to Brazil and signed with Uninassau Basquette of the Brazilian league. In September 2020, de Souza signed with BC Castors Braine of the Euroleague for the 2020–21 European season to fill an empty roster spot left by Ivana Tikvić who had to leave the team for personal reasons.

== International competitions ==
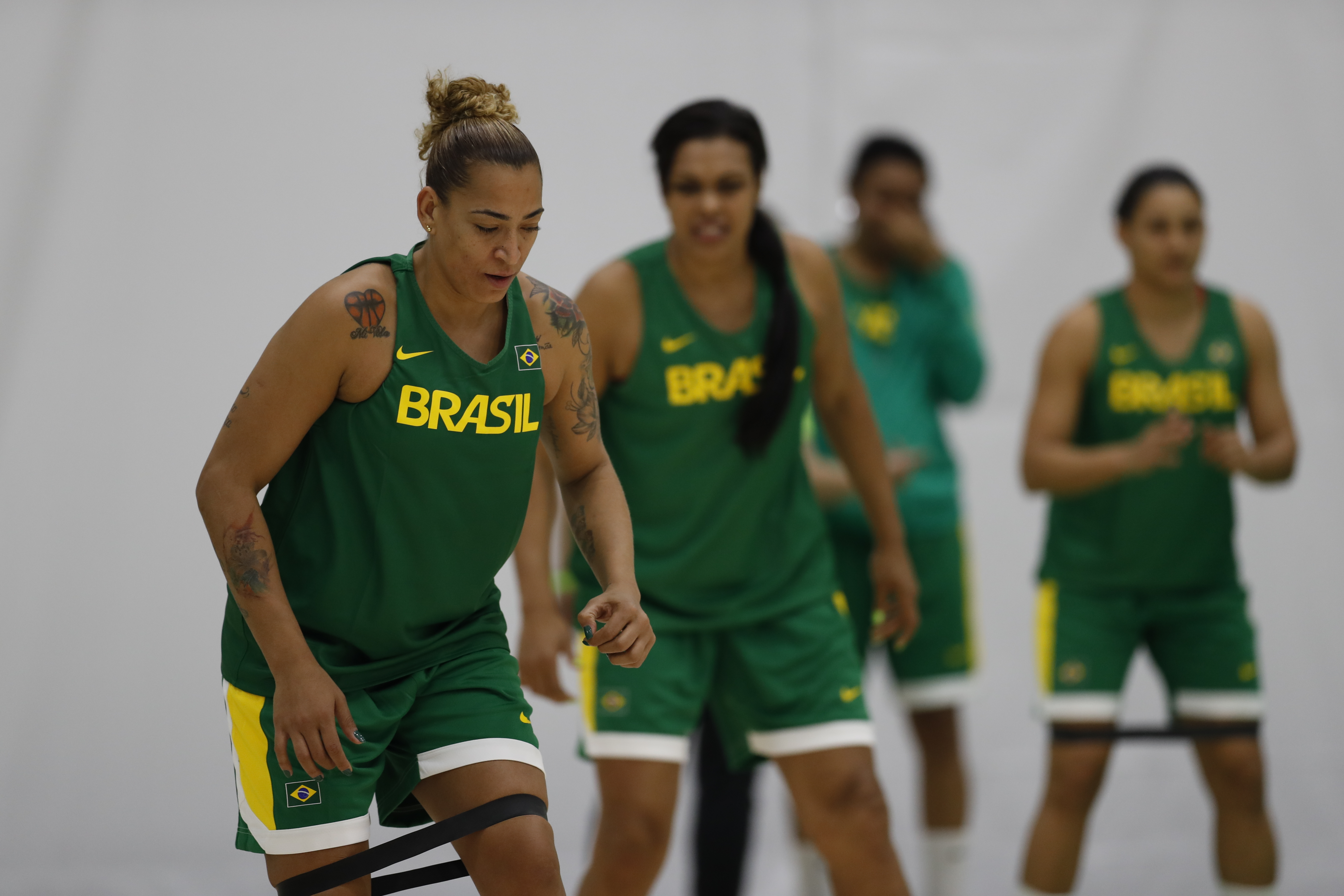
Érika (left) training with Brazil during the 2016 Olympics.

A member of the Brazil women's national basketball team, de Souza competed in three editions of the Olympic Games, 2004, 2012 and 2016 Summer Olympics as well as four World Championships. She was due to represent her country in the Olympic Qualifying Tournament where Brazil qualified for the 2008 Summer Olympics but missed it due to injury and was officially ruled out of playing in the Olympics on 29 July.

De Souza was a member of the team which competed for Brazil at the 2011 Pan American Games, winning a bronze medal.

== WNBA career statistics ==
Legend
GP	Games played	GS	Games started	MPG	Minutes per game	RPG	Rebounds per game
APG	Assists per game	SPG	Steals per game	BPG	Blocks per game	PPG	Points per game
TO	Turnovers per game	FG%	Field-goal percentage	3P%	3-point field-goal percentage	FT%	Free-throw percentage
**Bold**	Career best	°	League leader

†	Denotes seasons in which de Souza won a WNBA championship

=== Regular season ===
Year	Team	GP	GS	MPG	FG%	3P%	FT%	RPG	APG	SPG	BPG	TO	PPG
2002^{†}	Los Angeles	11	0	3.7	.357	.000	.200	1.3	0.2	0.2	0.0	**0.5**	1.1
2007	Connecticut	**34**	2	12.2	.534	.000	.476	3.0	0.4	0.2	0.9	1.0	4.3
2008	Atlanta	12	8	23.1	**.585**	.000	.615	6.6	0.7	**1.4**	**1.7**	1.6	9.3
2009	Atlanta	**34**	**34**	27.3	.528	.000	.653	9.1	1.1	0.9	1.2	2.0	11.8
2010	Atlanta	**34**	**34**	25.6	.571	.000	.547	8.3	0.9	0.7	1.1	1.8	12.4
2011	Atlanta	32	32	27.4	.499	.000	.655	7.5	1.0	1.1	1.3	1.7	11.8
2012	Atlanta	15	15	**29.9**	.523	.000	.696	8.2	**1.6**	1.3	1.5	2.0	11.6
2013	Atlanta	**34**	**34**	**29.9**	.553	.000	.677	**9.9**	1.3	1.3	**1.7**	1.6	12.9
2014	Atlanta	33	33	**29.9**	.545	.000	.706	8.7	1.2	1.1	1.4	1.7	**13.8**
2015*	Atlanta	17	17	29.0	.459	.000	.542	7.5	1.2	0.9	0.8	1.7	8.6
2015*	Chicago	17	15	19.3	.494	.000	.476	5.5	0.5	0.5	0.8	0.7	5.5
2015	Total	**34**	32	24.1	.472	.000	.511	6.5	0.9	0.7	0.8	1.3	7.1
2016	Chicago	31	18	19.3	.517	.000	.750	5.2	0.6	0.5	0.7	0.7	5.8
2017	San Antonio	27	21	12.5	.479	.000	**1.000**	2.6	0.7	0.3	0.3	0.8	3.6
Career	11 years, 4 teams	329	263	23.8	.529	.000	.637	6.7	0.9	0.8	1.1	1.5	9.3

=== Postseason ===
Year	Team	GP	GS	MPG	FG%	3P%	FT%	RPG	APG	SPG	BPG	TO	PPG
2002^{†}	Los Angeles	1	0	3.0	.000	.000	.750	1.0	0.0	0.0	0.0	**0.0**	3.0
2007	Connecticut	1	0	7.0	.000	.000	.000	0.0	1.0	0.0	0.0	**0.0**	0.0
2009	Atlanta	2	2	27.0	.556	.000	.750	7.0	1.0	**2.0**	1.0	5.0	11.5
2010	Atlanta	7	1	25.7	.500	.000	.800	8.3	1.1	0.7	**2.2**°	1.0	10.3
2011	Atlanta	5	5	**33.4**	.424	.000	.500	**11.4**	**1.4**	0.6	1.2	1.4	11.0
2012	Atlanta	3	3	29.7	.414	.000	**1.000**	6.3	0.3	0.6	0.6	1.3	8.7
2013	Atlanta	**8**	**8**	30.7	.464	.000	.588	10.0	1.3	1.1	0.7	2.2	11.0
2014	Atlanta	3	3	27.6	**.567**	.000	.500	5.3	0.7	0.3	0.6	1.0	**12.7**
2015	Chicago	3	3	22.6	.563	.000	**1.000**	4.7	0.7	0.6	0.3	0.3	7.0
2016	Chicago	5	0	10.4	.471	.000	**1.000**	2.6	0.4	1.0	0.0	0.6	3.6
Career	10 years, 4 teams	38	25	24.9	.476	.000	.677	7.2	0.9	0.8	0.9	1.4	9.1

== Awards and achievements ==
- 2002 WNBA Championship (LA Sparks)
- 2010–11 EuroLeague Women champion (Salamanca)
- Atlanta's all-time leader in rebounds (1,034), blocked shots (171) and field goal percentage (.535)
- 2009 WNBA All-Star Selection
- 2009 Ranked first in WNBA in offensive rebounds (119) and total rebounds (309) ... Ranked second in WNBA in rebounding percentage (9.1).
- 2010 Recorded a career high in rebounds (20) against Minnesota on 14 July
- 2005–06 Spanish MVP
- 2011 FIBA Americas Championship for Women MVP
