= 2010 WNBA Finals =

Basketball tournament

| Team | Coach | Wins |
|---|---|---|
| Seattle Storm | Brian Agler | 3 |
| Atlanta Dream | Marynell Meadors | 0 |
- Dates: September 12 – 16
- MVP: (Australia) Lauren Jackson (Seattle)
- Hall of Famers: Storm: Sue Bird (2025); Swin Cash (2022); Lauren Jackson (2021)
- Eastern finals: Atlanta defeated New York, 2–0
- Western finals: Seattle defeated Phoenix, 2–0

The 2010 WNBA Finals was the championship series of the 2010 season of the Women's National Basketball Association (WNBA) and the conclusion of the season's playoffs. The champions of the Eastern Conference, the Atlanta Dream, faced the champions of the Western Conference, the Seattle Storm.

The WNBA Finals were under a 2–2–1 rotation, with the Storm holding home-court advantage as they had a better regular season record (28–6) than the Dream (19–15). This was the 1st time the teams have met in the championship round. The Dream made their first ever appearance in the Finals while the Storm made their second appearance, after winning the 2004 championship series.

This was the second straight year in which neither team advancing to the Finals had been there the previous season. Seattle had not won a playoff series since their Finals victory in 2004, when they defeated the Connecticut Sun 2–1. Betty Lennox, who played with Atlanta after leaving the Storm (now with L.A.) was named series MVP in 2004. Only two players remain from the championship roster–all-stars Sue Bird and Lauren Jackson. To advance to the Finals, the Storm defeated Diana Taurasi and the defending champion Phoenix Mercury 2–0 in the Western Conference Finals.

This was the first WNBA Finals appearance for both head coaches. Each coach had been with their respective team since the 2008 season. Seattle's Brian Agler had been involved with the WNBA since 1999, when he was head coach of the Minnesota Lynx. Atlanta's Marynell Meadors was one of the league's original eight head coaches, leading the Charlotte Sting to a 15–13 record in their inaugural season. This was the first ever Finals series to feature the two most recent Coach of the Year award winners; Meadors won the award in 2009 and Agler won in 2010.

This series featured 9 international players (most notably Lauren Jackson) from 6 different backgrounds. Seattle's roster boasted five foreign-born players hailing from Australia, the Czech Republic and Russia. Atlanta had four, representing Belarus, Brazil and Saint Vincent and the Grenadines. This was a WNBA record for the championship series; eight international players were featured in the 1998 Finals.

The series ended with the Storm beating the Dream in Atlanta in a three games to zero. This was only the second time in WNBA history that a team won the Finals three games to none (previously done by Detroit in 2008).

== Background ==
=== 2010 WNBA playoffs ===
| Seattle Storm | | Atlanta Dream |
|---|---|---|
| 28–6 (.824); 1st West, 1st overall | Regular season | 19–15 (.559); 4th East, 5th overall |
| Defeated the (4) Los Angeles Sparks, 2–0 | Conference Semifinals | Defeated the (1) Washington Mystics, 2–0 |
| Defeated the (2) Phoenix Mercury, 2–0 | Conference Finals | Defeated the (2) New York Liberty, 2–0 |

=== Regular season series ===
The Storm won the regular season series:

ESPN2

June 1, 2010

Report

Atlanta Dream 72, Seattle Storm 90
| Pts: McCoughtry (16); Rebs: Lyttle (6) | Pts: Jackson (32); Rebs: Jackson (10) |

KeyArena, Seattle, WA
Attendance: 7,586

FSSO

August 10, 2010

Report

Seattle Storm 80, Atlanta Dream 70
| Pts: Jackson, Wright (14); Rebs: Jackson (8) | Pts: McCoughtry (16); Rebs: Lyttle (17) |

Philips Arena, Atlanta, GA
Attendance: 6,042

=== Atlanta Dream ===
The Atlanta Dream finished the regular season with a 19–15 record. As the No. 4 seed in the Eastern Conference, the Dream eliminated the No. 1 seeded Washington Mystics in two games during the conference playoff semifinals. In the Eastern Conference finals, the Dream went on to eliminate the New York Liberty in two games. In reaching the Finals, the Dream became the second team in WNBA history to do so as a four seed; the Charlotte Sting (coached by Liberty coach Anne Donovan) advanced to the 2001 WNBA Finals as a No. 4 seed. Also, the Dream became the second team in Eastern Conference history to reach the Finals after sweeping their opponents in the first two rounds, after the Connecticut Sun did it in 2005.

=== Seattle Storm ===
The Seattle Storm finished the regular season as the Western Conference champion with a 28–6 record. As the No. 1 seed in the conference, the Storm eliminated the No. 4 seeded Los Angeles Sparks in two games in the first round; the Sparks had eliminated the Storm from the playoffs in three of the previous five seasons. In the Western Conference Finals against the Phoenix Mercury, the Storm won Game 1 but trailed by as many as 19 points in Game 2. They rallied back and Sue Bird made a 3-pointer with under three seconds left to win the series on Phoenix's home floor. This is the first time since their 2004 championship season in which the Storm were not eliminated in the first round of the playoffs.

== Game summaries ==
All times listed below are Eastern Daylight Time.

=== Game 1 ===
ABC

September 12
3:00pm

Report

Atlanta Dream 77, Seattle Storm 79
Scoring by quarter: 17–22, 22–17, 14–20, 24–20
| Pts: McCoughtry, Marques (19); Rebs: Lyttle (14); Asts: Price (3); Stls: Lyttle (5) | Pts: Jackson (26); Rebs: Little (11); Asts: Bird (8); 3PFGs: Jackson (4–8) |
Seattle leads series, 1-0

KeyArena, Seattle, WA
Attendance: 15,084
Referees:
#8 Daryl Humphrey
#9 Denise Brooks
#39 Michael Price

Sue Bird made a tiebreaking jumper from the foul line with 2.6 seconds left and the Storm beat the Dream 79–77. Angel McCoughtry had a last-second try for the Dream, but her long 3-pointer from the left side did not connect.

League MVP Lauren Jackson had 26 points and eight rebounds for Seattle. Bird finished with 14 points and Camille Little had 18 points and 11 rebounds.

McCoughtry and Iziane Castro Marques had 19 points apiece for Atlanta. Sancho Lyttle added 10 points and 14 rebounds.

Jackson made a 3-pointer late in the third quarter to give Seattle the lead for good at 52–49 and the Storm led by six going into the fourth quarter.

Atlanta trailed by nine in the fourth before rallying, tying it at 77 on Castro Marques' old-fashioned three-point play with a minute left.

Each team had to deal with foul trouble for one of its star players. Seattle forward Swin Cash picked up two in the first minute of the game and was whistled for her third foul before the half-way mark of the first quarter. McCoughtry had three early fouls and sat out the second quarter; she later missed much of the third quarter after knocking heads with Seattle's Jana Vesela.

=== Game 2 ===
ESPN2

September 14
9:00pm

Report

Atlanta Dream 84, Seattle Storm 87
Scoring by quarter: 21–19, 26–30, 18–20, 19–18
| Pts: McCoughtry, Marques (21); Rebs: McCoughtry (9); Asts: Miller (8); FGs: Castro Marques (10–20) | Pts: Jackson (26); Rebs: Little (9); Asts: Bird (5); Stls: Wright (5) |
Seattle leads series, 2-0

KeyArena, Seattle, WA
Attendance: 13,898
Referees:
#55 Eric Brewton
#13 Cameron Inouye
#17 Scott Twardoski

League MVP Lauren Jackson scored 26 points, Swin Cash added 19 and the Seattle Storm moved one step closer to the title with an 87–84 win over the Atlanta Dream in Game 2 of the finals.

Seattle improved to 21–0 at home with the win.

Iziane Castro Marques, who kept Atlanta close with 21 points Tuesday night, might have broken her nose for the second time in two months after a first-quarter collision kept her on the bench for a chunk of the second quarter with an ice bag on her nose. Angel McCoughtry, the Dream's leading scorer, wore a Band-Aid over her left eye, the result of a collision in Game 1 that required stitches.

McCoughtry was off in Game 2, making just seven of 23 shots on her way to 21 points. She tried to salvage the shaky performance, scoring five quick points in the final 30 seconds to help Atlanta close to 87–84.

Cash missed two free throws with 2.2 seconds left but Atlanta could not get off a potential tying shot.

"I just missed some shots. You're going to have bad days," McCoughtry said. "I had good looks. Usually I knock them down. I just didn't knock them down today. I just gotta stay more focused."

=== Game 3 ===
ESPN2

September 16
8:00pm

Report

Seattle Storm 87, Atlanta Dream 84
Scoring by quarter: 28–24, 15–20 , 24–16, 20–24
| Pts: Cash (18); Rebs: Jackson (9); Asts: Bird (7); 3PFGs: Cash (3–5) | Pts: McCoughtry (35); Rebs: de Souza (14); Asts: C. Miller (5); FGs: McCoughtry (13–23) |
Seattle wins WNBA Finals, 3-0

Philips Arena, Atlanta, GA
Attendance: 10,522
Referees:
#4 Sue Blauch
#38 Lamont Simpson
#18 Kurt Walker

After losing in the first round of the playoffs five straight years following their first title, Sue Bird, Lauren Jackson and the Seattle Storm are champions again.

"I guess now I can be honest," Bird said. "Losing in the first round has been terrible. It's something I took personally and something a lot of us took personally. I judge myself by winning, so to not win in five years really, really hurt."

The Storm made up for the long gap between titles by dominating the 2010 season. Seattle was 28-6 during the regular season - tying the league record for wins - before sweeping each of its three postseason series.

Bird and Jackson are the only players remaining from the Storm's 2004 title team.

"I think the roads have been completely different," said Jackson of the two championships. "After the last six years, it definitely has taken a long time to get here."

Jackson, who had 26 points in each of the Storm's first two wins in the series, had 15 points and nine rebounds and was selected MVP of the finals.

Swin Cash scored 18 points to lead a balanced offense as Seattle overcame 35 points by Atlanta's Angel McCoughtry.

The Dream star, who set a WNBA playoff record with 42 points in the Eastern Conference finals clinching win over the New York Liberty, tried to rally Atlanta with nine points in the final 2:30. But McCoughtry and Coco Miller missed 3-pointers in the final 6 seconds, setting off a celebration by Seattle's players.

The Dream rallied in the final minute after trailing 82–70.

McCoughtry's three-point play with 46 seconds remaining cut Seattle's lead to 85–80. Seattle's Tanisha Wright missed two free throws and McCoughtry was fouled by Cash while missing a 3. McCoughtry made two of three free throws to cut the lead to three points with 31 seconds remaining.

Bird dribbled away the shot clock before missing a shot to set up a basket by Atlanta's Iziane Castro Marques with 6.9 seconds left. McCoughtry immediately fouled Camille Little, who made two free throws to give Seattle an 87–84 lead. McCoughtry missed a 3-pointer but the rebound went to Atlanta before Coco Miller also missed a last-second 3.

"I think we have grown up quite a bit this season," said Atlanta coach Marynell Meadors. "Maybe another minute on the clock might have made a difference in the outcome of this game and the same thing with the two games in Seattle."

== Awards ==
- 2010 WNBA Champions: Seattle Storm
- Finals MVP: Lauren Jackson (Seattle)

== Rosters ==
2010 Seattle Storm Finals roster
Players
Coaches

| Pos. | No. | Nat. | Name | Height | Weight | From |
|---|---|---|---|---|---|---|
| G/F | 25 | (Russia) | Abrosimova, Svetlana | 6' 2" (1.88m) | 169 lb (77kg) | Connecticut |
| PG | 10 | (United States) | Bird, Sue | 5' 9" (1.75m) | 150 lb (68kg) | Connecticut |
| F | 5 | (Australia) | Bishop, Abby | 6' 3" (1.91m) | 191 lb (87kg) | Australia |
| SF | 2 | (United States) | Cash, Swin | 6' 1" (1.85m) | 162 lb (73kg) | Connecticut |
| F/C | 15 | (Australia) | Jackson, Lauren | 6' 5" (1.96m) | 187 lb (85kg) | Australia |
| G | 40 | (Australia) | Lacey, Alison | 6' 0" (1.83m) | 159 lb (72kg) | Iowa State |
| PF | 20 | (United States) | Little, Camille | 6' 2" (1.88m) | 180 lb (82kg) | North Carolina |
| C | 43 | (United States) | Robinson, Ashley | 6' 4" (1.93m) | 180 lb (82kg) | Tennessee |
| F | 7 | (Czech Republic) | Veselá, Jana | 6' 3" (1.91m) | 195 lb (88kg) | Czech Republic |
| PF | 34 | (United States) | Willingham, Le'coe | 6' 0" (1.83m) | 200 lb (91kg) | Auburn |
| PG | 30 | (United States) | Wright, Tanisha | 5' 11" (1.8m) | 165 lb (75kg) | Penn State |

Head coach
(United States) Brian Agler (Wittenberg)
Assistant coaches
(United States) Jenny Boucek (Virginia)
(United States) Nancy Darsch (Springfield)
Athletic trainer
(United States) Tom Spencer (Central Washington)
Strength and conditioning coach
(United States) Melissa Hardin

Legend

- (C) Team captain
- (DP) Unsigned draft pick
- (FA) Free agent
- (S) Suspended
- Injured

2010 Atlanta Dream Finals roster
Players
Coaches

| Pos. | No. | Nat. | Name | Height | Weight | From |
|---|---|---|---|---|---|---|
| C | 33 | (United States) | Bales, Alison | 6' 7" (2.01m) | 218 lb (99kg) | Duke |
| G/F | 8 | (Brazil) | Castro Marques, Iziane | 6' 0" (1.83m) | 140 lb (64kg) | Brazil |
| F/C | 14 | (Brazil) | de Souza, Erika | 6' 5" (1.96m) | 190 lb (86kg) | Brazil |
| G | 5 | (United States) | Lehning, Shalee | 5' 9" (1.75m) | 147 lb (67kg) | Kansas State |
| C | 11 | (Belarus) | Leuchanka, Yelena | 6' 5" (1.96m) | 195 lb (88kg) | West Virginia |
| F | 20 | (Saint Vincent and the Grenadines) | Lyttle, Sancho | 6' 4" (1.93m) | 143 lb (65kg) | Houston |
| F | 35 | (United States) | McCoughtry, Angel | 6' 1" (1.85m) | 160 lb (73kg) | Louisville |
| SG | 9 | (United States) | Miller, Coco | 5' 9" (1.75m) | 140 lb (64kg) | Georgia |
| PG | 2 | (United States) | Miller, Kelly | 5' 10" (1.78m) | 140 lb (64kg) | Georgia |
| G/F | 22 | (United States) | Price, Armintie | 5' 9" (1.75m) | 133 lb (60kg) | Mississippi |
| G | 0 | (United States) | Raven, Brittainey | 6' 0" (1.83m) | 162 lb (73kg) | Texas |

Head coach
(United States) Marynell Meadors (Middle Tennessee)
Assistant coaches
(United States) Sue Panek (Maryland)
(United States) Carol Ross (Mississippi)
(United States) Fred Williams (Boise State)
Strength and conditioning coach
(United States) Kim Moseley (Southern Miss)

Legend

- (C) Team captain
- (DP) Unsigned draft pick
- (FA) Free agent
- (S) Suspended
- Injured
