= Foul Play =

Foul Play or Foul play may refer to:

- Foul play, unfair, unethical, or criminal behaviour
- Foul Play (novel), 1869, by Charles Reade
- Foul Play (1920 film), British
- Foul Play (1977 film), Spanish
- Foul Play (1978 film), American
- Foul Play (album), by Dennis Brown
- Foul Play (group), English jungle group
- Foul Play (TV series), 1981
- Foul Play (video game), 2013
- Foul (sports), act of a player violating the rules of a sport or game

== See also ==
- Foul (disambiguation)
- Fowl Play (disambiguation)
- Crime, an unlawful act punishable by some authority
