= Foulness (disambiguation) =

Foulness is an island on the east coast of Essex, England.

Foulness may also refer to:

- River Foulness, a river in the East Riding of Yorkshire, England
- Foulness SSSI, a biological Site of Special Scientific Interest between Southend-on-Sea and the Crouch estuary, Essex, England

== See also ==
- Foul (disambiguation)
