= Foul =

Foul may refer to:

== In sports ==
- Foul (sports), an unfair or illegal act during a sports competition, including:
  - Foul (association football), in football (soccer)
  - Professional foul, in football (soccer) or rugby
  - Foul (basketball)
- Foul ball, in baseball, a batted ball that lands in foul territory
- Foul (fanzine), a 1970s British football fanzine

== Other uses ==
- Foul (nautical), to entangle or entwine
- Lord Foul, the villain of The Chronicles of Thomas Covenant, a fantasy novel series by Stephen R. Donaldson
- Ful medames, a fava bean stew

== See also ==
- Foul Bay (disambiguation)
- Foul Point, Coronation Island, South Orkney Islands
- Foul play (disambiguation)
- Fouling, in engineering, accumulation of unwanted deposits on solid surfaces
- Fowl (disambiguation)
