= 2014 FIBA World Championship for Women final =

2014 FIBA World Championship for Women Final
Spain	United States
(Spain)	(United States)
64	77
	1	2	3	4	Total
Spain	17	12	19	16	64
United States	28	20	19	10	77
- Date: 5 October 2014
- Venue: Ülker Sports Arena, Istanbul
- Referees: Roberto Chiari (ITA); Jasmina Juras (SRB); Karen Lasuik (CAN)
- Attendance: 5,600

The 2014 FIBA World Championship for Women Final was a basketball game that took place on 5 October 2014 at the Ülker Sports Arena in Istanbul, Turkey, to determine the winner of the 2014 FIBA World Championship for Women.

== Road to the final ==
Spain		Round	United States	
Opponent	Result	Group stage	Opponent	Result
Japan	74–50	Match 1	China	87–56
Brazil	83–56	Match 2	Serbia	94–74
Czech Republic	67–43	Match 3	Angola	119–44
Pos / Team / Pld / Pts; 1 / Spain / 3 / 6; 2 / Czech Republic / 3 / 5; 3 / Brazil / 3 / 4; 4 / Japan / 3 / 3; Source: FIBA		Final standing	Pos / Team / Pld / Pts; 1 / United States / 3 / 6; 2 / Serbia / 3 / 5; 3 / China / 3 / 4; 4 / Angola / 3 / 3; Source: FIBA	
Opponent	Result	Knockout stage	Opponent	Result
China	71–55	Quarter-finals	France	94–72
Turkey	66–56	Semifinals	Australia	82–70

== Match details ==
5 October 2014
21:15 EEST

Boxscore

Spain	64–77	United States
Scoring by quarter: 17–28, 12–20, 19–19, 16–10
Pts: Lyttle 16; Rebs: Nicholls, Lyttle 11; Asts: Lyttle 4		Pts: Moore 18; Rebs: Charles 8 Asts: Taurasi 8

Ülker Sports Arena, Istanbul
Attendance: 5,600
Referees: Roberto Chiari (ITA), Jasmina Juras (SRB), Karen Lasuik (CAN)

Spain	United States

Starters:			Pts	Reb	Ast
PG	9	Laia Palau	6	4	2
SG	10	Marta Xargay	2	2	2
SF	7	Alba Torrens	10	0	0
PF	14	Sancho Lyttle	16	11	4
C	4	Laura Nicholls	10	11	2
Reserves:					
PG	5	Leticia Romero	0	0	0
PG	6	Silvia Domínguez	6	0	1
SG	8	Leonor Rodríguez	3	1	1
SF	11	Nuria Martínez	0	2	1
SG	12	Laura Gil	0	0	0
PF	13	Lucila Pascua	0	0	0
SG	15	Anna Cruz	11	4	1
Head coach:
(Spanish Basketball Federation) Lucas Mondelo

Spain	Statistics	United States
18/59 (30.5%)	2-pt field goals	28/48 (58.3%)
7/22 (31.8%)	3-pt field goals	4/11 (36.4%)
7/9 (77.8%)	Free throws	9/12 (75%)
23	Offensive rebounds	8
19	Defensive rebounds	32
42	Total rebounds	40
14	Assists	20
19	Turnovers	20
8	Steals	9
1	Blocks	1
19	Fouls	19

2014 World champions

United States
9th title

Starters:			Pts	Reb	Ast
PG	6	Sue Bird	0	1	3
SG	12	Diana Taurasi	6	4	8
SF	7	Maya Moore	18	4	2
PF	14	Tina Charles	10	8	4
C	15	Brittney Griner	11	4	0
Reserves:					
PG	4	Lindsay Whalen	12	2	2
SG	5	Seimone Augustus	10	6	1
SF	8	Angel McCoughtry	2	2	0
PG	9	Odyssey Sims	0	0	0
PF	10	Breanna Stewart	0	0	0
PF	11	Candice Dupree	6	2	0
PF	13	Nneka Ogwumike	2	3	0
Head coach:
(USA Basketball) Geno Auriemma
