= List of WNBA career steals leaders =

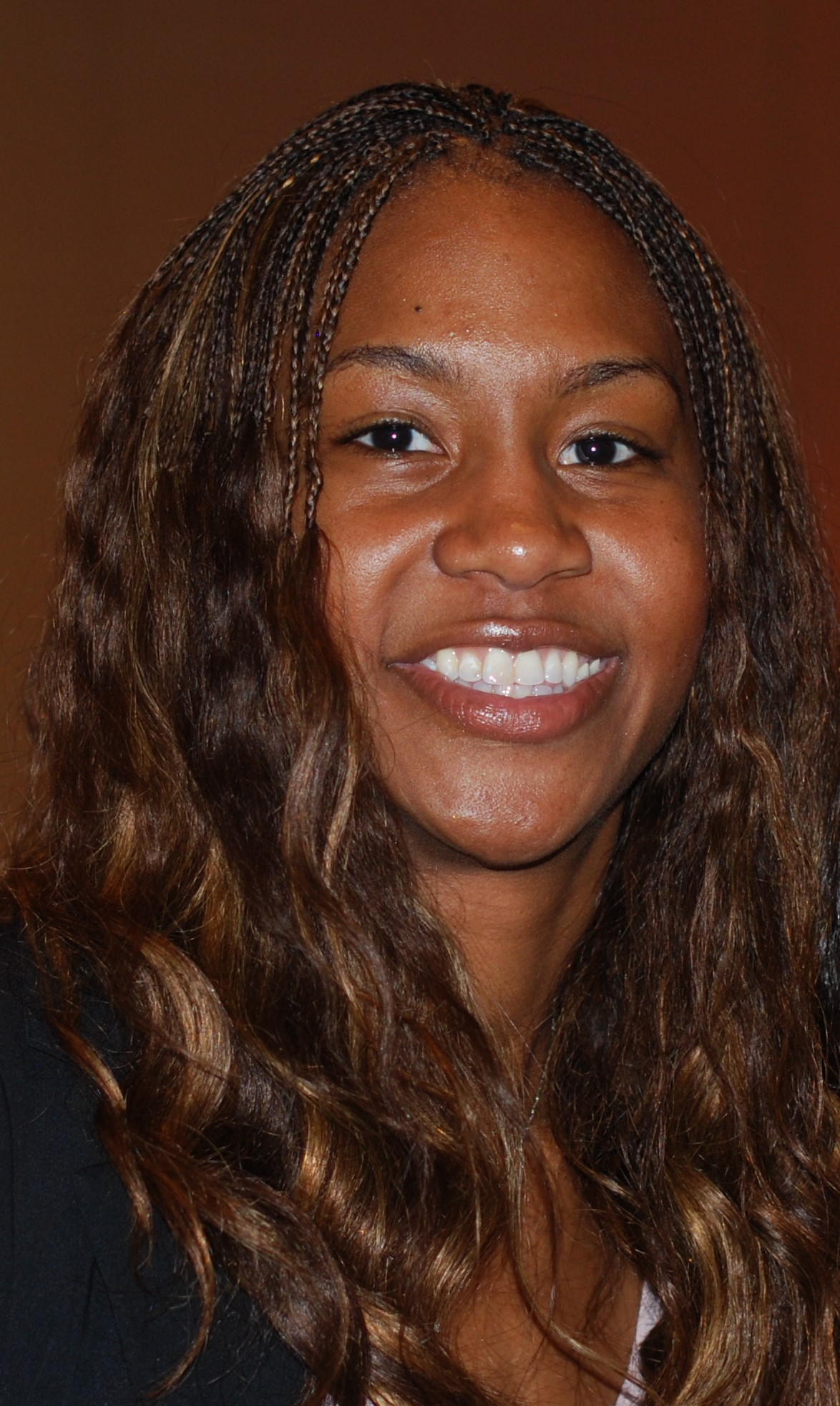
Tamika Catchings has the most steals in WNBA history.

This article provides two lists:

A list of Women's National Basketball Association players by total career regular season steals.
A progressive list of steals leaders showing how the record has increased through the years.

== Steals leaders ==
This is a list of Women's National Basketball Association players by total career regular season leaders in steals.

Statistics accurate as of the 2026 season.

^	Active WNBA player
*	Inducted into the Naismith Memorial Basketball Hall of Fame
†	Not yet eligible for Hall of Fame consideration (Note: A player is not eligible for induction into the Naismith Memorial Basketball Hall of Fame until she has been fully retired for two calendar years.)
§	Eligible for Hall of Fame in 2025

Rank	Player	Position(s)	Team(s) played for (years)	Total steals	Games played (Note: Games played in prior seasons where steals were not recorded are not included in total games played nor are they used in calculating the per game average.)	Steals per game average (Note: Average is rounded to the nearest hundredth and its calculation does not include games played in seasons before steals were officially recorded.)
1	Tamika Catchings*	F	Indiana Fever (2002–2016)	1,074	457	2.35
2	Ticha Penicheiro	G	Sacramento Monarchs (1998–2009); Los Angeles Sparks (2010–2011); Chicago Sky (2012)	764	454	1.68
3	Sue Bird*	G	Seattle Storm (2002–2022) (Note: Bird did not play the 2013 season and 2019 season because of knee surgery.)	725	580	1.25
4	Nneka Ogwumike^	F	Los Angeles Sparks (2012–2023, 2026–present); Seattle Storm (2024–2025)	718	480	1.50
5	Alana Beard	G/F	Washington Mystics (2004–2011); Los Angeles Sparks (2012–2019)	710	419	1.70
6	DeWanna Bonner^	F/G	Phoenix Mercury (2009–2019, 2025–2026); Connecticut Sun (2020–2024); Indiana Fever (2025); Atlanta Dream (2026–present)	677	577	1.17
7	Sheryl Swoopes*	F/G	Houston Comets (1997–2007) (Note: Swoopes missed the 2001 season due to an injury.); Seattle Storm (2008); Tulsa Shock (2011)	657	324	2.03
8	Jia Perkins	G	Charlotte Sting (2004–2005); Chicago Sky (2006–2010); San Antonio Silver Stars/Stars (2011–2015); Minnesota Lynx (2016–2017)	635	417	1.52
9	Sancho Lyttle	F	Houston Comets (2005–2008); Atlanta Dream (2009–2017); Phoenix Mercury (2018–2019)	634	392	1.61
10	Angel McCoughtry	F/G	Atlanta Dream (2009–2019) (Note: McCoughtry sat out during 2017 to rest.); Las Vegas Aces (2020–2021); Minnesota Lynx (2022)	627	311	2.02
11	Katie Douglas	G/F	Orlando Miracle/Connecticut Sun (2001–2007, 2014); Indiana Fever (2008–2013)	623	412	1.51
12	DeLisha Milton-Jones	F	Los Angeles Sparks (1999–2004, 2008–2012); Washington Mystics (2005–2007); San Antonio Silver Stars (2013); New York Liberty (2013–2014); Atlanta Dream (2014–2015)	619	499	1.24
13	Alyssa Thomas^	G	Connecticut Sun (2014–2024); Phoenix Mercury (2025–present)	612	401	1.53
14	Taj McWilliams-Franklin	F/C	Orlando Miracle (1999–2002); Connecticut Sun (2003–2006); Los Angeles Sparks (2007); Washington Mystics (2008); Detroit Shock (2008–2009); New York Liberty (2010); Minnesota Lynx (2011–2012)	580	440	1.32
15	Courtney Vandersloot^	G	Chicago Sky (2011–2022, 2025–present); New York Liberty (2023–2024)	575	463	1.24
16	Tully Bevilaqua	G	Cleveland Rockers (1998); Portland Fire (2000–2002); Seattle Storm (2003–2004); Indiana Fever (2005–2010); San Antonio Silver Stars (2011–2012)	573	425	1.35
17	Yolanda Griffith*	C/F	Sacramento Monarchs (1999–2007); Seattle Storm (2008); Indiana Fever (2009)	529	311	1.70
18	Candace Parker*	F/C	Los Angeles Sparks (2008–2020); Chicago Sky (2021–2022); Las Vegas Aces (2023)	523	410	1.28
19	Diana Taurasi^{†}	G	Phoenix Mercury (2004–2024) (Note: Taurasi did not play the 2015 season at the request of her Russian Premier League team, UMMC Ekaterinburg.)	518	565	0.92
20	Natasha Howard^	F	Indiana Fever (2014–2015, 2025); Minnesota Lynx (2016–2017, 2026–present); Seattle Storm (2018–2020); New York Liberty (2021–2022); Dallas Wings (2023–2024)	504	424	1.19
21	Lindsay Whalen*	G	Connecticut Sun (2004–2009); Minnesota Lynx (2010–2018)	501	480	1.04
22	Chelsea Gray^	G	Connecticut Sun (2015); Los Angeles Sparks (2016–2020); Las Vegas Aces (2021–present)	498	412	1.2
23	Shannon Johnson	G	Orlando Miracle/Connecticut Sun (1999–2003); San Antonio Silver Stars (2004–2006); Detroit Shock (2007); Houston Comets (2008); Seattle Storm (2009)	494	352	1.40
24	Lisa Leslie*	C	Los Angeles Sparks (1997–2009) (Note: Leslie did not play the 2007 season because of a pregnancy leave.)	492	363	1.36
25	Sylvia Fowles*	C	Chicago Sky (2008–2014); Minnesota Lynx (2015–2022)	490	408	1.20

== Progressive list of steal leaders ==
This is a progressive list of assist leaders showing how the record increased through the years.

Statistics accurate as of the 2026 season.

^	Active WNBA player
*	Inducted into the Naismith Memorial Basketball Hall of Fame
^{†}	Not yet eligible for Hall of Fame consideration (Note: A player is not eligible for induction into the Naismith Memorial Basketball Hall of Fame until she has been fully retired for two calendar years.)
§	Eligible for Hall of Fame in 2025

Team abbreviationsTeam(s) listed is the one player was on when she established the record.
ATL	Atlanta Dream	HOU	Houston Comets	MIN	Minnesota Lynx
CHI	Chicago Sky	IND	Indiana Fever	NYL	New York Liberty
CON	Connecticut Sun	LAS	Los Angeles Sparks	SAC	Sacramento Monarchs
DET	Detroit Shock	MIA	Miami Sol	SEA	Seattle Storm

Steals leader at the end of every season
Season	Year-by-year leader	Steals	Active player leader	Total steals	Career record	Total steals	Single-season record	Steals	Season
1997	Teresa Weatherspoon*NYL	85	Teresa Weatherspoon*NYL	85	Teresa Weatherspoon*NYL	85	Teresa Weatherspoon*NYL	85	1997
1998	Teresa Weatherspoon*NYL	100	Teresa Weatherspoon*NYL	185	Teresa Weatherspoon*NYL	185	Teresa Weatherspoon*NYL	100	1998
1999	Teresa Weatherspoon*NYL	78	Teresa Weatherspoon*NYL	263	Teresa Weatherspoon*NYL	263	Teresa Weatherspoon*NYL	100	1999
2000	Sheryl Swoopes*HOU	87	Teresa Weatherspoon*NYL	328	Teresa Weatherspoon*NYL	328	Teresa Weatherspoon*NYL	100	2000
2001	Debbie BlackMIA	82	Teresa Weatherspoon*NYL	383	Teresa Weatherspoon*NYL	383	Teresa Weatherspoon*NYL	100	2001
2002	Tamika Catchings*IND	94	Teresa Weatherspoon*NYL	425	Teresa Weatherspoon*NYL	425	Teresa Weatherspoon*NYL	100	2002
2003	Sheryl Swoopes*HOU	77	Teresa Weatherspoon*NYL	453	Teresa Weatherspoon*NYL	453	Teresa Weatherspoon*NYL	100	2003
2004	Yolanda Griffith*SAC	75	Teresa Weatherspoon*NYL	465	Teresa Weatherspoon*NYL	465	Teresa Weatherspoon*NYL	100	2004
2004	Nykesha SalesCON	75	Teresa Weatherspoon*NYL	465	Teresa Weatherspoon*NYL	465	Teresa Weatherspoon*NYL	100	2004
2005	Tamika Catchings*IND	90	Sheryl Swoopes*HOU	520	Sheryl Swoopes*HOU	520	Teresa Weatherspoon*NYL	100	2005
2006	Tamika Catchings*IND	94	Sheryl Swoopes*HOU	584	Sheryl Swoopes*HOU	584	Teresa Weatherspoon*NYL	100	2006
2007	Loree MooreNYL	75	Sheryl Swoopes*HOU	589	Sheryl Swoopes*HOU	589	Teresa Weatherspoon*NYL	100	2007
2008	Alexis HornbuckleDET	79	Ticha PenicheiroSAC	655	Ticha PenicheiroSAC	655	Teresa Weatherspoon*NYL	100	2008
2009	Tamika Catchings*IND	99	Ticha PenicheiroSAC	685	Ticha PenicheiroSAC	685	Teresa Weatherspoon*NYL	100	2009
2010	Tamika Catchings*IND	77	Ticha PenicheiroSAC	728	Ticha PenicheiroSAC	728	Teresa Weatherspoon*NYL	100	2010
2011	Epiphanny Prince^{†}CHI	79	Tamika Catchings*IND	775	Tamika Catchings*IND	775	Teresa Weatherspoon*NYL	100	2011
2012	Sancho LyttleATL	82	Tamika Catchings*IND	845	Tamika Catchings*IND	845	Teresa Weatherspoon*NYL	100	2012
2013	Angel McCoughtryATL	89	Tamika Catchings*IND	930	Tamika Catchings*IND	930	Teresa Weatherspoon*NYL	100	2013
2014	Sancho LyttleATL	74	Tamika Catchings*IND	957	Tamika Catchings*IND	957	Teresa Weatherspoon*NYL	100	2014
2014	Angel McCoughtryATL	74	Tamika Catchings*IND	957	Tamika Catchings*IND	957	Teresa Weatherspoon*NYL	100	2014
2015	Angel McCoughtryATL	72	Tamika Catchings*IND	1,012	Tamika Catchings*IND	1,012	Teresa Weatherspoon*NYL	100	2015
2016	Tamika Catchings*IND	62	Tamika Catchings*IND	1,074	Tamika Catchings*IND	1,074	Teresa Weatherspoon*NYL	100	2016
2017	Alana BeardLAS	71	Alana BeardLAS	653	Tamika Catchings*IND	1,074	Teresa Weatherspoon*NYL	100	2017
2018	Maya Moore*MIN	57	Alana BeardLAS	697	Tamika Catchings*IND	1,074	Teresa Weatherspoon*NYL	100	2018
2019	Natasha Howard^SEA	74	Alana BeardLAS	709	Tamika Catchings*IND	1,074	Teresa Weatherspoon*NYL	100	2019
2020	Alyssa Thomas^CON	42	Sue Bird*SEA	659	Tamika Catchings*IND	1,074	Teresa Weatherspoon*NYL	100	2020
2021	Brittney Sykes^LAS	58	Sue Bird*SEA	687	Tamika Catchings*IND	1,074	Teresa Weatherspoon*NYL	100	2021
2022	Brittney Sykes^LAS	65	Sue Bird*SEA	725	Tamika Catchings*IND	1,074	Teresa Weatherspoon*NYL	100	2022
2023	Jordin Canada^LAS	86	DeWanna Bonner^CON	556	Tamika Catchings*IND	1,074	Teresa Weatherspoon*NYL	100	2023
2024	Arike Ogunbowale^DAL	81	Nneka Ogwumike^SEA	618	Tamika Catchings*IND	1,074	Teresa Weatherspoon*NYL	100	2024
2025	Gabby Williams^SEA	99	Nneka Ogwumike^SEA	668	Tamika Catchings*IND	1,074	Teresa Weatherspoon*NYL	100	2025
2026	Rhyne Howard^ATL	99	Nneka Ogwumike^SEA	718	Tamika Catchings*IND	1,074	Teresa Weatherspoon*NYL	100	2026
Season	Year-by-year leader	Steals	Active player leader	Total steals	Career record	Total steals	Single-season record	Steals	Season
