= 2010 Atlanta Dream season =

- Head coach: Marynell Meadors
- Arena: Philips Arena

Results
- Record: 19–15 (.559)
- Place: 4th (Eastern)
- Playoff finish: Lost WNBA Finals

Media
- Television: FS-S, SSO; NBATV, ESPN2

The 2010 Atlanta Dream season was the 3rd season for the Atlanta Dream of the Women's National Basketball Association, and their 3rd season under head coach, Marynell Meadors.

== Transactions ==
=== Sacramento Monarchs Dispersal Draft ===
With the Sacramento Monarchs ceasing operation and based on the 2009 records of teams, the Dream selected 9th in the Dispersal Draft. The Dream waived their right to pick and chose nobody.

=== WNBA draft ===
Round	Pick	Player	Nationality	School/Team/Country
1	9	Chanel Mokango	Congo	Mississippi State
2	21	Brigitte Ardossi	United States	Georgia Tech
3	33	Brittainey Raven	United States	Texas

=== Trades and Roster Changes ===
Date	Trade
January 5, 2010	Extended Qualifying Offers to Ivory Latta and Yelena Leuchanka
February 2, 2010	Signed Yelena Leuchanka to a Training Camp Contract
February 23, 2010	Signed Ivory Latta and Erica White to Training Camp Contracts
March 10, 2010	Signed Demetress Adams to a Training Camp Contract
March 11, 2010	Traded Michelle Snow and a Second Round Pick in the 2011 WNBA draft to the San Antonio Silver Stars for Dalma Ivanyi and a Second Round Pick in the 2011 WNBA Draft
March 16, 2010	Signed Erika de Souza to a Multi-Year Contract
March 16, 2010	Signed Kelly Miller and Coco Miller to Multi-Year Contracts
March 23, 2010	Waived Ivory Latta
April 14, 2010	Signed Chanel Mokango, Brittainey Raven, and Brigitte Ardossi to Rookie Scale Contracts
April 19, 2010	Signed Alison Bales to a Training Camp Contract
April 24, 2010	Signed Shawn Goff to a Training Camp Contract
April 26, 2010	Signed Britany Miller and Chandi Jones to Training Camp Contracts
April 26, 2010	Waived Jennifer Lacy
April 28, 2010	Signed Tatum Brown to a Training Camp Contract
May 2, 2010	Waived Tatum Brown
May 5, 2010	Waived Britany Miller
May 10, 2010	Waived Erica White and Brigitte Ardossi
May 13, 2010	Waived Shawn Goff
May 14, 2010	Waived Chanel Mokango and Demetress Adams
May 14, 2010	Signed Armintie Price to a Contract Extension
May 14, 2010	Temporarily Suspend Yelena Leuchanka due to Overseas Commitments
May 19, 2010	Activated Yelena Leuchanka from her Temporary Suspension
May 19, 2010	Waived Chamique Holdsclaw

== Roster ==
2010 Atlanta Dream roster
Players
Coaches

Pos.	No.	Nat.	Name	Height	Weight	From
C	33	(United States)	Bales, Alison	6' 7" (2.01m)	218 lb (99kg)	Duke
G/F	8	(Brazil)	Castro Marques, Iziane	6' 0" (1.83m)	140 lb (64kg)	Brazil
F/C	14	(Brazil)	de Souza, Erika	6' 5" (1.96m)	190 lb (86kg)	Brazil
G	5	(United States)	Lehning, Shalee	5' 9" (1.75m)	147 lb (67kg)	Kansas State
C	11	(Belarus)	Leuchanka, Yelena	6' 5" (1.96m)	195 lb (88kg)	West Virginia
F	20	(Spain)	Lyttle, Sancho	6' 4" (1.93m)	143 lb (65kg)	Houston
F	35	(United States)	McCoughtry, Angel	6' 1" (1.85m)	160 lb (73kg)	Louisville
SG	9	(United States)	Miller, Coco	5' 9" (1.75m)	140 lb (64kg)	Georgia
PG	2	(United States)	Miller, Kelly	5' 10" (1.78m)	140 lb (64kg)	Georgia
G/F	22	(United States)	Price, Armintie	5' 9" (1.75m)	133 lb (60kg)	Mississippi
G	0	(United States)	Raven, Brittainey	6' 0" (1.83m)	162 lb (73kg)	Texas

Head coach
(United States) Marynell Meadors (Middle Tennessee)
Assistant coaches
(United States) Sue Panek (Maryland)
(United States) Carol Ross (Mississippi)
(United States) Fred Williams (Boise State)
Strength and conditioning coach
(United States) Kim Moseley (Southern Miss)

Legend

- (C) Team captain
- (DP) Unsigned draft pick
- (FA) Free agent
- (S) Suspended
- Injured

WNBA roster page

=== Depth ===
Pos.	Starter	Bench
C	Érika de Souza	Alison Bales
PF	Sancho Lyttle	Yelena Leuchanka
SF	Angel McCoughtry	Brittainey Raven
SG	Iziane Castro Marques	Armintie Price
PG	Shalee Lehning	Kelly Miller; Coco Miller

== Schedule ==
=== Preseason ===
2013 Preseason Schedule
Total: 0–2 (Home: 0–1; Road: 0–1)

Game	Date	Time (ET)	Opponent	Score	High points	High rebounds	High assists	Location/Attendance	Record
1	May 4	11:00am	@ Connecticut	79-86	McCoughtry (19)	Price (7)	Price (5)	Mohegan Sun Arena; 3,779	0–1
2	May 9	2:00pm	Washington	58-77	Castro Marques (13)	McCoughtry (6)	Lehning, Price (3)	Eblen Center; 2,219	0–2

=== Regular season ===
2010 Regular Season
Total: 19–15 (Home: 10–7; Road: 9–8)
May: 6–0 (Home: 2–0; Road: 4–0)

Game	Date	Time (ET)	Opponent	TV	Score	High points	High rebounds	High assists	Location/Attendance	Record
1	May 15	8:00pm	@ San Antonio	FS-SW	75-70	Castro Marques (23)	de Souza (15)	Lehning (6)	AT&T Center; 9,409	1–0
2	May 16	7:00pm	Indiana	SSO	66-62	de Souza, Price (14)	de Souza (11)	Miller (6)	Philips Arena; 7,337	2–0
3	May 21	7:00pm	Connecticut	NBATV; FS-S; CSN-NE	97-82	McCoughtry (32)	Lyttle (17)	Lehning (10)	Philips Arena; 4,092	3–0
4	May 23	4:00pm	@ New York		86-77	McCoughtry (21)	Bales, de Souza (10)	McCoughtry (6)	Madison Square Garden; 9,548	4–0
5	May 28	10:00pm	@ Phoenix		96-93	McCoughtry (28)	Lyttle (17)	Lehning (5)	US Airways Center; 7,986	5–0
6	May 30	8:00pm	@ Los Angeles		101-82	McCoughtry (32)	de Souza (13)	Castro Marques, Lehning (5)	STAPLES Center; 8,404	6–0

June: 6–4 (Home: 4–1; Road: 2–3)

Game	Date	Time (ET)	Opponent	TV	Score	High points	High rebounds	High assists	Location/Attendance	Record
7	June 1	9:30pm	@ Seattle	ESPN2	72-90	McCoughtry (16)	Lyttle (6)	McCoughtry (3)	KeyArena; 7,586	6–1
8	June 4	7:00pm	Chicago	FS-S	70-80	Castro Marques (18)	de Souza (7)	Lehning (6)	Philips Arena; 2,515	6–2
9	June 5	7:00pm	@ Washington		86-79 (OT)	de Souza, McCoughtry (23)	Lyttle (17)	Castro Marques, K. Miller (6)	Verizon Center; 8,986	7–2
10	June 11	7:30pm	@ New York		79-91	de Souza (21)	Lyttle (14)	K. Miller (6)	Madison Square Garden; 8,332	7–3
11	June 13	3:00pm	San Antonio	NBATV; SSO	90-83	Lyttle (24)	Lyttle (12)	Lehning (8)	Philips Arena; 6,050	8–3
12	June 15	8:00pm	@ Chicago	CN100	93-86	Castro Marques (31)	de Souza (13)	Lehning (9)	Allstate Arena; 3,292	9–3
13	June 19	7:00pm	@ Indiana		91-94	Catchings, Douglas (17)	Catchings (7)	Catchings (6)	Conseco Fieldhouse; 8,187	9–4
14	June 23	12:00pm	Tulsa	NBATV; SSO; FS-OK	96-90	McCoughtry (29)	Lyttle (12)	Castro Marques (8)	Philips Arena; 9,598	10–4
15	June 27	3:00pm	Los Angeles	NBATV; SSO	89-81	Castro Marques (25)	Lyttle (11)	Lehning, McCoughtry (5)	Philips Arena; 7,855	11–4
16	June 29	7:00pm	Phoenix	SSO	94-88	McCoughtry (18)	Leuchanka (9)	K. Miller (8)	Philips Arena; 4,073	12–4

July: 5–5 (Home: 3–1; Road: 2–4)

Game	Date	Time (ET)	Opponent	TV	Score	High points	High rebounds	High assists	Location/Attendance	Record
17	July 1	7:00pm	Minnesota	SSO	76-58	Castro Marques (22)	Lyttle (14)	Lehning (5)	Philips Arena; 4,020	13–4
18	July 3	7:00pm	Chicago	NBATV; SSO	82-88	McCoughtry (20)	de Souza (15)	Lyttle, K. Miller (3)	Philips Arena; 6,920	13–5
19	July 7	7:00pm	Connecticut	SSO	108-103 (OT)	Castro Marques, McCoughtry (32)	de Souza (13)	Lehning (8)	Philips Arena; 5,305	14–5
20	July 14	1:00pm	@ Minnesota		81-83	McCoughtry (25)	de Souza (20)	Lehning (6)	Target Center; 12,311	14–6
21	July 16	7:00pm	@ Indiana		70-89	McCoughtry (27)	Leuchanka (7)	Lehning (3)	Conseco Fieldhouse; 7,532	14–7
22	July 17	7:00pm	@ Connecticut		80-96	McCoughtry (27)	Lyttle (11)	Castro Marques, Price (5)	Mohegan Sun Arena; 7,378	14–8
23	July 21	11:30am	@ Washington	NBATV; CSN-MA	72-82	McCoughtry (23)	Lyttle (8)	Castro Marques (6)	Verizon Center; 14,347	14–9
24	July 25	3:00pm	New York	NBATV; SSO	82-75	McCoughtry (28)	de Souza, McCoughtry (10)	McCoughtry (6)	Philips Arena; 7,030	15–9
25	July 27	1:30pm	@ Tulsa	NBATV; COX	105-89	Castro Marques (23)	Lyttle (14)	Lehning (6)	BOK Center; 3,800	16–9
26	July 30	7:30pm	@ Connecticut		94-62	McCoughtry (20)	de Souza (13)	K. Miller, Price (5)	Mohegan Sun Arena; 7,003	17–9

August: 2–6 (Home: 1–5; Road: 1–1)

Game	Date	Time (ET)	Opponent	TV	Score	High points	High rebounds	High assists	Location/Attendance	Record
27	August 1	3:00pm	Indiana	NBATV; SSO	90-74	Castro Marques (22)	Lyttle (8)	Lehning, McCoughtry (7)	Philips Arena; 6,270	18–9
28	August 3	7:30pm	Washington	ESPN2	78-86	McCoughtry (30)	Lyttle (9)	Lehning (6)	Philips Arena; 9,072	18–10
29	August 6	7:00pm	@ Indiana		93-95	McCoughtry (31)	Lyttle (8)	Lehning (6)	Conseco Fieldhouse; 9,214	18–11
30	August 10	7:00pm	Seattle	FS-S	70-80	McCoughtry (16)	Lyttle (17)	Lehning (6)	Philips Arena; 6,042	18–12
31	August 13	7:00pm	New York	SSO	83-90	McCoughtry (22)	Lyttle (13)	Lehning (8)	Philips Arena; 6,025	18–13
32	August 14	8:00pm	@ Chicago	CN100	92-74	de Souza (17)	Bales (12)	Price (6)	Allstate Arena; 4,214	19–13
33	August 17	7:00pm	Chicago	NBATV; FS-S	79-84	Castro Marques (19)	Leuchanka (11)	Lehning, Miller (4)	Philips Arena; 5,209	19–14
34	August 22	3:00pm	Washington	SSO	81-90	McCoughtry (19)	Lyttle (11)	Lyttle (6)	Philips Arena; 9,570	19–15

All games are viewable on WNBA LiveAccess

=== Playoffs ===
2010 Playoffs Schedule
Eastern Conference Semifinals vs. Washington (Won Series 2-0)

Game	Date	Time (ET)	Opponent	TV	Score	High points	High rebounds	High assists	Location/Attendance	Series
1	August 25	7:00pm	@ Washington	NBATV	95-90	McCoughtry (28)	de Souza, Lyttle (9)	Price (8)	Verizon Center; 10,322	1–0
2	August 27	7:30pm	Washington	NBATV; FS-S	101-77	McCoughtry, Castro Marques (21)	Lyttle (10)	Lehning (9)	Philips Arena; 7,890	2–0

Eastern Conference Finals vs. New York (Won Series 2-0)

Game	Date	Time (ET)	Opponent	TV	Score	High points	High rebounds	High assists	Location/Attendance	Series
1	September 5	7:00pm	@ New York	NBATV; MSG	81-75	McCoughtry (21)	Lyttle (13)	Lehning (5)	Madison Square Garden; 14,248	1–0
2	September 7	7:30pm	New York	NBATV; FS-S; MSG	105-93	McCoughtry (42)	de Souza (6)	Castro Marques (5)	Philips Arena; 9,045	2–0

WNBA Finals vs. Seattle (Lost Series 0-3)

Game	Date	Time (ET)	Opponent	TV	Score	High points	High rebounds	High assists	Location/Attendance	Series
1	September 12	3:00pm	@ Seattle	ABC	77-79	Castro Marques, McCoughtry (19)	Lyttle (14)	Lehning (3)	KeyArena; 15,084	0–1
2	September 14	9:00pm	@ Seattle	ESPN2	84-87	Castro Marques, McCoughtry (21)	McCoughtry (9)	C. Miller (8)	KeyArena; 13,898	0–2
3	September 16	8:00pm	Seattle	ESPN2	84-87	McCoughtry (35)	de Souza (14)	C. Miller (5)	Philips Arena; 10,522	0–3

== Standings ==
Eastern Conference	W	L	PCT	GB	Home	Road	Conf.
Washington Mystics ^{x}	22	12	.647	–	13–4	9–8	13–9
New York Liberty ^{x}	22	12	.647	–	13–4	9–8	14–8
Indiana Fever ^{x}	21	13	.618	1.0	13–4	8–9	13–9
Atlanta Dream ^{x}	19	15	.559	3.0	10–7	9–8	10–12
Connecticut Sun ^{o}	17	17	.500	5.0	12–5	5–12	9–13
Chicago Sky ^{o}	14	20	.412	8.0	7–10	7–10	7–15

== Playoffs ==
**Conference semifinals** Best-of-3
E1	Washington	0
E4	**Atlanta**	**2**
**Eastern Conference**
E2	**New York**	**2**
E3	Indiana	1
W1	**Seattle**	**2**
W4	Los Angeles	0
**Western Conference**
W2	**Phoenix**	**2**
W3	San Antonio	0

**Conference finals** Best-of-3
E4	**Atlanta**	**2**
E2	New York	0
W1	**Seattle**	**2**
W2	Phoenix	0

**WNBA Finals**; Best-of-5
E4	Atlanta	0
W1	**Seattle**	**3**

- **Bold** – Series winner
- Italics – Team with home-court advantage

== Statistics ==
Legend
GP	Games played	GS	Games started	MPG	Minutes per game	RPG	Rebounds per game
APG	Assists per game	SPG	Steals per game	BPG	Blocks per game	PPG	Points per game
FG%	Field-goal percentage	3P%	3-point field-goal percentage	FT%	Free-throw percentage	TO	Turnovers per game
PF	Fouls per game		Team leader		League leader

=== Regular season ===
Player	GP	GS	MPG	FG%	3P%	FT%	RPG	APG	SPG	BPG	PPG
Angel McCoughtry	34	34	30.7	40.8	26.2	80.3	4.9	3.1	1.94	0.6	21.1
Iziane Castro Marques	34	34	28.9	44.4	29.5	65.9	1.7	2.6	0.8	0.1	16.9
Sancho Lyttle	32	31	29.1	48.4	0.0	72.5	9.9	2.2	1.7	0.6	12.8
Érika de Souza	34	34	25.6	57.1	0.0	54.7	8.3	0.9	0.8	1.2	12.4
Armintie Price	34	0	16.5	38.7	0.0	59.4	3.0	1.8	0.9	0.1	4.9
Yelena Leuchanka	32	0	10.6	47.6	20.0	74.4	2.6	0.4	0.5	0.3	4.2
Alison Bales	34	3	15.6	43.3	41.7	79.6	3.8	0.8	0.7	1.1	3.9
Shalee Lehning	33	33	23.5	45.3	36.1	46.7	2.7	4.8	0.8	0.2	3.7
Kelly Miller	30	1	16.4	29.0	32.9	88.0	1.9	2.6	0.8	0.1	3.6
Coco Miller	27	0	7.3	40.0	19.2	85.7	0.6	0.8	0.2	0.0	3.1
Brittainey Raven	23	0	5.4	24.4	27.8	87.5	0.9	0.4	0.2	0.0	1.5

=== Playoffs ===
Player	GP	GS	MPG	FG%	3P%	FT%	RPG	APG	SPG	BPG	PPG
Angel McCoughtry	7	7	30.9	46.2	45.5	79.7	5.4	2.3	2.0	0.6	26.7
Iziane Castro Marques	7	7	32.1	47.1	40.7	47.8	2.4	2.0	0.1	0.1	16.9
Coco Miller	7	7	25.7	39.1	26.3	78.9	2.7	3.3	1.3	0.0	10.6
Sancho Lyttle	7	7	25.4	50.0	0.0	88.9	9.6	1.7	2.0	1.1	10.6
Erika de Souza	7	1	25.7	50.0	0.0	80.0	8.3	1.1	0.7	2.3	10.3
Armintie Price	7	6	25.7	34.2	0.0	60.0	2.7	3.6	0.9	0.0	5.0
Yelena Leuchanka	7	0	9.6	55.6	50.0	50.0	2.0	0.4	0.4	0.1	3.4
Shalee Lehning	7	0	13.1	36.8	25.0	50.0	1.9	2.6	0.4	0.0	2.9
Kelly Miller	4	0	6.8	75.0	50.0	100.0	0.5	1.5	0.3	0.0	2.5
Alison Bales	7	0	7.3	62.5	0.0	0.0	1.7	0.4	0.3	1.0	1.4
Brittainey Raven	4	0	1.0	0.0	0.0	75.0	0.3	0.0	0.0	0.0	0.8

== Awards and honors ==
Recipient	Award	Date awarded	Ref.
Angel McCoughtry	Eastern Conference Player of the Week	May 24	
Angel McCoughtry	Eastern Conference Player of the Week	June 1	
Angel McCoughtry	Eastern Conference Player of the Month - May	June 3	
Angel McCoughtry	All-Defensive First Team	August 29	
Angel McCoughtry	All-WNBA Second Team	September 13	
Sancho Lyttle	All-Defensive Second Team	August 29	
Iziane Castro Marques	Eastern Conference Player of the Week	July 12	
