= Fowl (disambiguation) =

Fowl are birds belonging the biological orders Galliformes (gamefowl or landfowl) or Anseriformes (waterfowl).

Fowl may also refer to:

== Arts, entertainment, and media ==
- Artemis Fowl, a book series written by Eoin Colfer
- F.O.W.L., an evil organization in Darkwing Duck and the DuckTales reboot.
- Fowl Records, a record label
- Orion Fowl, a character in the novel Artemis Fowl: The Atlantis Complex
- Ms. Winifred Fowl, a character in the Jimmy Neutron movie and series

== Other uses ==
- Fan-out wafer-level packaging or FOWL packaging, an integrated circuits packaging technology
- Fowl River, a river in Alabama
- Friends of WikiLeaks or FoWL, a social network in support of WikiLeaks

== See also ==
- Foul (disambiguation)
