= Fowl Play =

Fowl Play can refer to:

- Fowl Play (1937 film), a Popeye animated film
- Fowl Play (2026 film), a Spanish comedy thriller film
- "Fowl Play", an episode of Back at the Barnyard (a television show) aired in November 2007
- Fowl Play (album), by Sister Sparrow & the Dirty Birds

== See also ==
- Foul Play (disambiguation)
