= 2010 WNBA playoffs =

Professional women's basketball tournament

- Dates: August 25 – September 16, 2010

Final positions
- Champions: Seattle Storm
- Runners-up: Atlanta Dream

Tournament statistics
- Attendance: 10,822 per game
- Scoring leader (s): Angel McCoughtry (Atlanta) (26.7 PPG)

Awards
- MVP: Lauren Jackson (Seattle)

The 2010 WNBA playoffs is the postseason for the Women's National Basketball Association's 2010 season.

== Format ==
- The top 4 teams from each conference qualify for the playoffs.
  - All 4 teams are seeded by basis of their standings.
- The series for rounds one and two are in a best-of-three format with Games 1 and 3 on the home court of the team with the higher seed. In previous years, the higher seed would play the first game on the road, then games 2 and (if needed) 3 at home.
- The series for the WNBA Finals is in a best-of-five format with Games 1, 2 and 5 on the home court of the team with the higher seed.

=== Tiebreak procedures ===
==== Two-team tie ====
1. Better record in head-to-head games.
2. Better winning percentage within own conference.
3. Better winning percentage against all teams with .500 or better record at the end of the season.
4. Better point differential in games head-to-head.
5. Coin toss.

==== Three or more-team tie ====
1. Better winning percentage among all head-to-head games involving tied teams.
2. Better winning percentage against teams within conference (for first two rounds of playoffs) or better record against teams in the opposite conference (for Finals).
3. Better winning percentage against all teams with a .500 or better record at the end of the season.
4. Better point differential in games involving tied teams.
5. Coin toss.

== Playoff qualifying ==
=== Eastern Conference ===
Seed	Team	W	L	Tiebreaker	Clinched	
Seed	Team	W	L	Tiebreaker	Playoff berth	Conf. Homecourt
1	Washington Mystics	22	12	3–2 vs. NYL	August 15	August 22
2	New York Liberty	22	12	2–3 vs. WAS	August 14	—
3	Indiana Fever	21	13	—	August 13	—
4	Atlanta Dream	19	15	—	August 14	—

=== Western Conference ===
Seed	Team	W	L	Tiebreaker	Clinched	
Seed	Team	W	L	Tiebreaker	Playoff berth	Playoffs Homecourt
1	Seattle Storm	28	6	—	July 22	August 10
2	Phoenix Mercury	15	19	—	August 13	—
3	San Antonio Silver Stars	14	20	—	August 22	—
4	Los Angeles Sparks	13	21	4–0 vs. MIN	August 20	—

== Bracket ==
**Conference semifinals** Best-of-3
E1	Washington	0
E4	**Atlanta**	**2**
**Eastern Conference**
E2	**New York**	**2**
E3	Indiana	1
W1	**Seattle**	**2**
W4	Los Angeles	0
**Western Conference**
W2	**Phoenix**	**2**
W3	San Antonio	0

**Conference finals** Best-of-3
E4	**Atlanta**	**2**
E2	New York	0
W1	**Seattle**	**2**
W2	Phoenix	0

**WNBA Finals**; Best-of-5
E4	Atlanta	0
W1	**Seattle**	**3**

- **Bold** – Series winner
- Italics – Team with home-court advantage

== Eastern Conference ==
=== Conference semifinals ===
==== (1) Washington Mystics vs. (4) Atlanta Dream ====
NBATV

August 25
7:00pm

Game 1

**Atlanta Dream** **95**, Washington Mystics 90
Scoring by quarter: 17–**19**, **31**–14, 20–**25**, 27–**32**
Pts: McCoughtry (28); Rebs: de Souza, Lyttle (9); Asts: Price (8)	Pts: Coleman (18); Rebs: Currie (11); Asts: Harding (5)

Verizon Center, Washington D.C.
Attendance: 10,322
Referees: Michael Price, Tony Dawkins, Cameron Inouye

NBATV
FSSO

August 27
7:30pm

Report

Washington Mystics 77, **Atlanta Dream** **101**
Scoring by quarter: **21**–17, 7–**33**, 15–**25**, **34**–26
Pts: Ajavon (20); Rebs: Currie, Langhorne (7); Asts: Ajavon (3)	Pts: Castro Marques, McCoughtry (21); Rebs: Lyttle (10); Asts: Lehning (9)
**Atlanta won the series 2–0**

Philips Arena, Atlanta, GA
Attendance: 7,890
Referees: Eric Brewton, Amy Bonner, Kevin Sparrock

Regular-season series

The Washington Mystics won 3–1 in the regular-season series:

June 5, 2010

Report

**Atlanta Dream 86**, Washington Mystics 79

Verizon Center, Washington D.C.

July 21, 2010

Report

Atlanta Dream 72, **Washington Mystics 82**

Verizon Center, Washington D.C.

August 3, 2010

Report

**Washington Mystics 86**, Atlanta Dream 78

Philips Arena, Atlanta, GA

August 22, 2010

Report

**Washington Mystics 90**, Atlanta Dream 81

Philips Arena, Atlanta, GA

==== (2) New York Liberty vs. (3) Indiana Fever ====
NBATV
MSG

August 26
7:00pm

Game 1

Indiana Fever 73, **New York Liberty** **85**
Scoring by quarter: **22**–21, 25–**27**, 12–**18**, 14–**19**
Pts: Catchings (18); Rebs: Davenport (8); Asts: Catchings (6)	Pts: Pondexter (28); Rebs: McWilliams-Franklin (10); Asts: McCarville (7)

Madison Square Garden, New York, NY
Attendance: 14,624
Referees: Sue Blauch, Jeff Smith, Daryl Humphrey

ESPN2

August 29
8:00pm

Game 2

New York Liberty 67, **Indiana Fever** **75**
Scoring by quarter: 8–**21**, **19**–18, 19–**25**, **21**–11
Pts: Pondexter (24); Rebs: McCarville (11); Asts: Mitchell, Pondexter (2)	Pts: Catchings (17); Rebs: Catchings (13); Asts: Douglas (5)

Conseco Fieldhouse, Indianapolis, IN
Attendance: 7,535
Referees: Kurt Walker, Roy Gulbeyan, Felicia Grinter

NBATV
MSG

September 1
7:30pm

Game 3

Indiana Fever 74, **New York Liberty** **77**
Scoring by quarter: **26**–21, 21–**25**, **19**–17, 8–**14**
Pts: Douglas (24); Rebs: Catchings (6); Asts: Douglas (4)	Pts: Pondexter (30); Rebs: McWilliams-Franklin (11); Asts: McWilliams-Franklin, Mitchell, Pondexter (4)
**New York won the series 2–1**

Madison Square Garden, New York, NY
Attendance: 16,682
Referees: Eric Brewton, Denise Brooks, Lamont Simpson

Regular-season series

The teams were tied 2–2 in the regular-season series:

June 5, 2010

Report

New York Liberty 73, **Indiana Fever 78**

Conseco Fieldhouse, Indianapolis, IN

July 18, 2010

Report

**Indiana Fever 84**, New York Liberty 81

Madison Square Garden, New York, NY

August 3, 2010

Report

**New York Liberty 82**, Indiana Fever 72

Conseco Fieldhouse, Indianapolis, IN

August 17, 2010

Report

Indiana Fever 57, **New York Liberty 78**

Madison Square Garden, New York, NY

=== Conference finals ===
==== (2) New York Liberty vs. (4) Atlanta Dream ====
NBATV
MSG

September 5
7:00pm

Report

**Atlanta Dream** **81**, New York Liberty 75
Scoring by quarter: **27**–21, 17–**18**, 12–**17**, **25**–19
Pts: McCoughtry (21); Rebs: Lyttle (13); Asts: Lehning (5)	Pts: Pondexter (24); Rebs: McWilliams-Franklin (11); Asts: Mitchell (6)

Madison Square Garden, New York, NY
Attendance: 14,248
Referees: Michael Price, Cameron Inouye, Clarke Stevens

NBATV
FSSO, MSG

September 7
7:30pm

Report

New York Liberty 93, **Atlanta Dream** **105**
Scoring by quarter: 21–**32**, 23–23, **29**–18, 20–**32**
Pts: Pondexter (36); Rebs: McWilliams-Franklin (6); Asts: Pondexter (9)	Pts: McCoughtry (42); Rebs: de Souza (6); Asts: Castro Marques (5)
**Atlanta won the series 2–0**

Philips Arena, Atlanta, GA
Attendance: 9,045
Referees: Sue Blauch, Scott Twardoski, Lamont Simpson

Regular-season series

The teams were tied 2–2 in the regular season series

May 23, 2010

Report

**Atlanta Dream 86**, New York Liberty 77

Madison Square Garden, New York, NY

June 11, 2010

Report

Atlanta Dream 79, **New York Liberty 91**

Madison Square Garden, New York, NY

July 25, 2010

Report

New York Liberty 75, **Atlanta Dream 82**

Philips Arena, Atlanta, GA

August 13, 2010

Report

**New York Liberty 90**, Atlanta Dream 83

Philips Arena, Atlanta, GA

== Western Conference ==
=== Conference semifinals ===
==== (1) Seattle Storm vs. (4) Los Angeles Sparks ====
ESPN2

August 25
11:00pm

Game 1

Los Angeles Sparks 66, **Seattle Storm** **79**
Scoring by quarter: 15–**25**, 18–18, 15–**16**, 18–**20**
Pts: Ferdinand-Harris (18); Rebs: Milton-Jones (8); Asts: Toliver (5)	Pts: Cash (20); Rebs: Jackson (9); Asts: Bird (12)

KeyArena, Seattle, WA
Attendance: 10,589
Referees: Lamont Simpson, Denise Brooks-Clauser, Roy Gulbeyan

ESPN2

August 28
3:00pm

Report

**Seattle Storm** **81**, Los Angeles Sparks 66
Scoring by quarter: 15–**20**, **27**–16, **22**–18, **17**–12
Pts: Jackson (24); Rebs: Jackson (9); Asts: Cash (5)	Pts: Thompson (18); Rebs: Milton-Jones (9); Asts: Thompson (5)
**Seattle won the series 2–0**

STAPLES Center, Los Angeles, CA
Attendance: 8,326
Referees: Michael Price, Cameron Inouye, Tom Mauer

Regular-season series

The Seattle Storm won 5–0 in the regular-season series:

May 16, 2010

Report

Los Angeles Sparks 67, **Seattle Storm 81**

KeyArena, Seattle, WA

June 5, 2010

Report

**Seattle Storm 79**, Los Angeles Sparks 75

Home Depot Center, Carson, CA

June 11, 2010

Report

Los Angeles Sparks 60, **Seattle Storm 82**

KeyArena, Seattle, WA

July 3, 2010

Report

**Seattle Storm 75**, Los Angeles Sparks 62

STAPLES Center, Los Angeles, CA

August 21, 2010

Report

Los Angeles Sparks 75, **Seattle Storm 76**

KeyArena, Seattle, WA

==== (2) Phoenix Mercury vs. (3) San Antonio Silver Stars ====
ESPN2

August 26
9:00pm

Game 1

San Antonio Silver Stars 93, **Phoenix Mercury** **106**
Scoring by quarter: 16–**25**, **23**–21, 24–**31**, **30**–29
Pts: Hammon (19); Rebs: Young (9); Asts: Snow, Hammon (4)	Pts: Dupree (32); Rebs: Dupree (8); Asts: Taurasi (10)

US Airways Center, Phoenix, AZ
Attendance: 8,927
Referees: Scott Twardoski, Kurt Walker, Brenda Pantoja

ESPN2

August 28
1:00pm

Game 2

**Phoenix Mercury** **92**, San Antonio Silver Stars 73
Scoring by quarter: **30**–15, **18**–15, 20–**21**, **24**–22
Pts: Taurasi (23); Rebs: Dupree (11); Asts: Taylor (12)	Pts: Hammon (21); Rebs: Young (9); Asts: Hammon (7)
**Phoenix won the series 2–0**

AT&T Center, San Antonio, TX
Attendance: 6,763
Referees: Clarke Stevens, Daryl Humphrey, Sue Blauch

Regular-season series

The teams were tied 2–2 in the regular-season series:

June 18, 2010

Report

**San Antonio Silver Stars 108**, Phoenix Mercury 105

US Airways Center, Phoenix, AZ

August 3, 2010

Report

**Phoenix Mercury 103**, San Antonio Silver Stars 92

AT&T Center, San Antonio, TX

August 6, 2010

Report

San Antonio Silver Stars 87, **Phoenix Mercury 103**

US Airways Center, Phoenix, AZ

August 22, 2010

Report

Phoenix Mercury 82, **San Antonio Silver Stars 83**

AT&T Center, San Antonio, TX

=== Conference finals ===
==== (1) Seattle Storm vs. (2) Phoenix Mercury ====
NBATV

September 2
10:00pm

Game 1

Phoenix Mercury 74, **Seattle Storm** **82**
Scoring by quarter: 14–**23**, 19–**24**, **22**–17, **19**–18
Pts: Taylor (16); Rebs: Dupree (11); Asts: Johnson (7)	Pts: Jackson (23); Rebs: Jackson (17); Asts: Bird (10)

KeyArena, Seattle, WA
Attendance: 9,686
Referees: Sue Blauch, Daryl Humphrey, Kurt Walker

ABC

September 5
3:00pm

Game 2

**Seattle Storm** **91**, Phoenix Mercury 88
Scoring by quarter: 22–**24**, 18–**24**, 21–**23**, **30**–17
Pts: Cash (23); Rebs: Cash, Jackson, Little (8); Asts: Bird (8)	Pts: Taurasi (28); Rebs: Smith (7); Asts: Johnson (12)
**Seattle won the series 2–0**

US Airways Center, Phoenix, AZ
Attendance: 9,010
Referees: Eric Brewton, Denise Brooks, Roy Gulbeyan

Regular-season series

The Seattle Storm won 5–0 in the regular-season series:

May 22, 2010

Report

**Seattle Storm 95**, Phoenix Mercury 89

US Airways Center, Phoenix, AZ

June 6, 2010

Report

Phoenix Mercury 74, **Seattle Storm 97**

KeyArena, Seattle, WA

July 14, 2010

Report

**Seattle Storm 111**, Phoenix Mercury 107

US Airways Center, Phoenix, AZ

July 27, 2010

Report

Phoenix Mercury 85, **Seattle Storm 91**

KeyArena, Seattle, WA

August 20, 2010

Report

**Seattle Storm 78**, Phoenix Mercury 73

US Airways Center, Phoenix, AZ

== WNBA Finals ==
=== Seattle Storm vs. Atlanta Dream ===
ABC

September 12
3:00pm

Report

Atlanta Dream 77, **Seattle Storm** **79**
Scoring by quarter: 17–**22**, **22**–17, 14–**20**, **24**–20
Pts: McCoughtry, Marques (19); Rebs: Lyttle (14); Asts: Price (3)	Pts: Jackson (26); Rebs: Little (11); Asts: Bird (8)

KeyArena, Seattle, WA
Attendance: 15,084
Referees: Daryl Humphrey, Denise Brooks, Michael Price

ESPN2

September 14
9:00pm

Report

Atlanta Dream 84, **Seattle Storm** **87**
Scoring by quarter: **21**–19, 26–**30**, 18–**20**, **19**–18
Pts: McCoughtry, Marques (21); Rebs: McCoughtry (9); Asts: Miller (8)	Pts: Jackson (26); Rebs: Little (9); Asts: Bird (5)

KeyArena, Seattle, WA
Attendance: 13,898
Referees: Eric Brewton, Cameron Inouye, Scott Twardoski

ESPN2

September 16
8:00pm

Report

**Seattle Storm** **87**, Atlanta Dream 84
Scoring by quarter: **28**–24, 15-**20**, **24**-16, 20-**24**
Pts: Cash (18); Rebs: Jackson (9); Asts: Bird (7)	Pts: McCoughtry (35); Rebs: de Souza (14); Asts: C. Miller (5)
**Seattle won the series 3–0**

Philips Arena, Atlanta, GA
Attendance: 10,522
Referees: Sue Blauch, Lamont Simpson, Kurt Walker

Regular-season series

The Seattle Storm won 2–0 in the regular-season series:

June 1, 2010

Report

Atlanta Dream 72, **Seattle Storm 90**

KeyArena, Seattle, WA

August 10, 2010

Report

**Seattle Storm 80**, Atlanta Dream 70

Philips Arena, Atlanta, GA
