= Brittainey Raven =

American basketball player (born 1988)

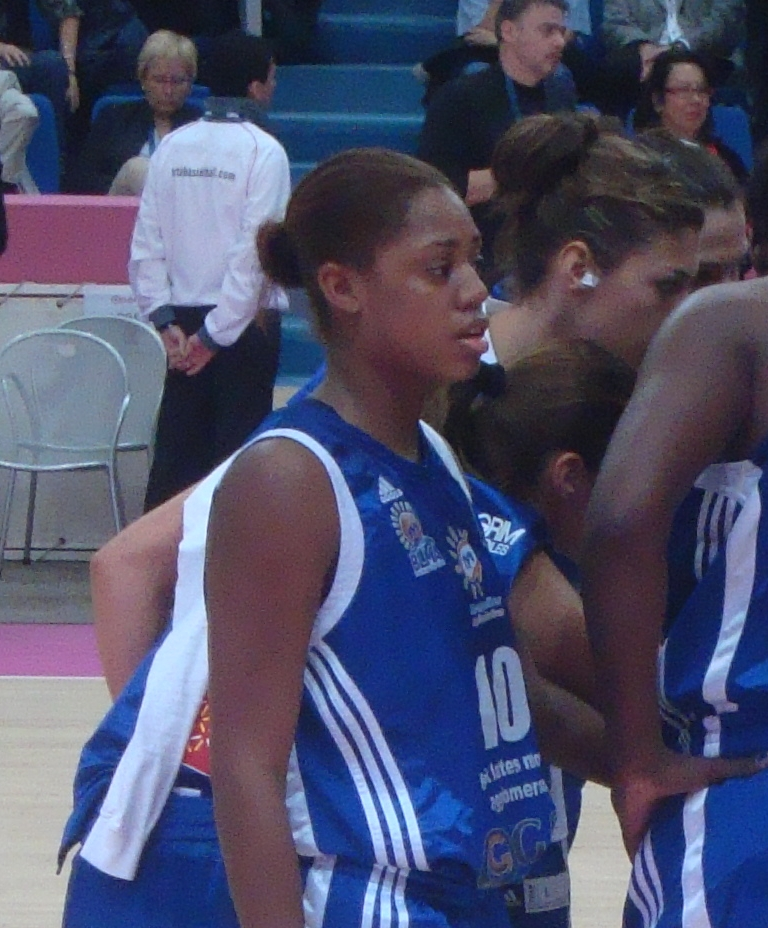

Personal information
- Born: August 1, 1988 (age 38)
- Listed height: 6 ft 0 in (1.83 m)
- Listed weight: 162 lb (73 kg)

Career information
- High school: North Crowley (Fort Worth, Texas)
- College: Texas (2006–2010)
- WNBA draft: 2010: 3rd round, 33rd overall pick
- Drafted by: Atlanta Dream
- Position: Guard
- Number: 0

Career history
- 2010: Atlanta Dream

Career highlights
- McDonald's All-American (2006); Texas Miss Basketball (2006)
- Stats at WNBA.com
- Stats at Basketball Reference
Medals
Women's basketball
Representing United States
FIBA Under-18 Americas Championship
Gold medal – first place	2006 United States	Team

Brittainey She Von Raven (born August 1, 1988) is a former American professional basketball player who spent one season playing guard in the WNBA. She is a graduate of the University of Texas at Austin and was drafted by the Atlanta Dream in the 3rd Round (33rd overall) of the 2010 WNBA draft.

== Pr0fessional career ==
=== WNBA ===
She was drafted as the 33rd overall pick in the 2010 WNBA draft by the Atlanta Dream and played for them in the 2010 season. She was waived by the team on June 6, 2011.

== International career ==
Raven was a member of the USA Women's U18 team which won the gold medal at the FIBA Americas Championship in Colorado Springs, Colorado. The event was held in July 2006, when the USA team defeated Canada to win the championship. Raven averaged 3.3 points per game over the course of the event.

== Career statistics ==
Legend
GP	Games played	GS	Games started	MPG	Minutes per game	RPG	Rebounds per game
APG	Assists per game	SPG	Steals per game	BPG	Blocks per game	PPG	Points per game
TO	Turnovers per game	FG%	Field-goal percentage	3P%	3-point field-goal percentage	FT%	Free-throw percentage
**Bold**	Career best	°	League leader

=== WNBA ===
==== Regular season ====
WNBA regular season statistics
Year	Team	GP	GS	MPG	FG%	3P%	FT%	RPG	APG	SPG	BPG	TO	PPG
2010	Atlanta	23	0	5.4	24.4	27.8	87.5	0.9	0.4	0.2	0.0	0.4	1.5
**Career**	1 year, 1 team	23	0	5.4	24.4	27.8	87.5	0.9	0.4	0.2	0.0	0.4	1.5

==== Playoffs ====
WNBA playoff statistics
Year	Team	GP	GS	MPG	FG%	3P%	FT%	RPG	APG	SPG	BPG	TO	PPG
2010	Atlanta	4	0	1.0	0.0	0.0	75.0	0.3	0.0	0.0	0.0	0.3	0.8
**Career**	1 year, 1 team	4	0	1.0	0.0	0.0	75.0	0.3	0.0	0.0	0.0	0.3	0.8

=== College ===
NCAA statistics
Year	Team	GP	Points	FG%	3P%	FT%	RPG	APG	SPG	BPG	PPG
2006–07	Texas	32	252	35.4	32.7	68.8	2.9	1.6	1.3	**0.5**	7.9
2007–08	Texas	**35**	**532**	**43.4**	25.7	72.4	4.3	**3.0**	**1.8**	0.4	**15.2**
2008–09	Texas	33	442	42.8	**37.6**	78.5	3.1	1.4	1.1	0.2	13.4
2009–10	Texas	33	472	41.2	35.2	**78.9**	**4.8**	2.6	1.5	0.2	14.3
**Career**		133	1698	41.2	33.0	75.4	3.8	2.2	1.4	0.3	12.8
