= Foul Bay (disambiguation) =

Foul Bay is a bay in Egypt.

Foul Bay may also refer to:

- Foul Bay, Barbados, a bay
- Foul Bay, Falkland Islands, a bay
- Foul Bay, South Australia, a locality
