= Foul (sports) =

Inappropriate act deemed by a referee in sports

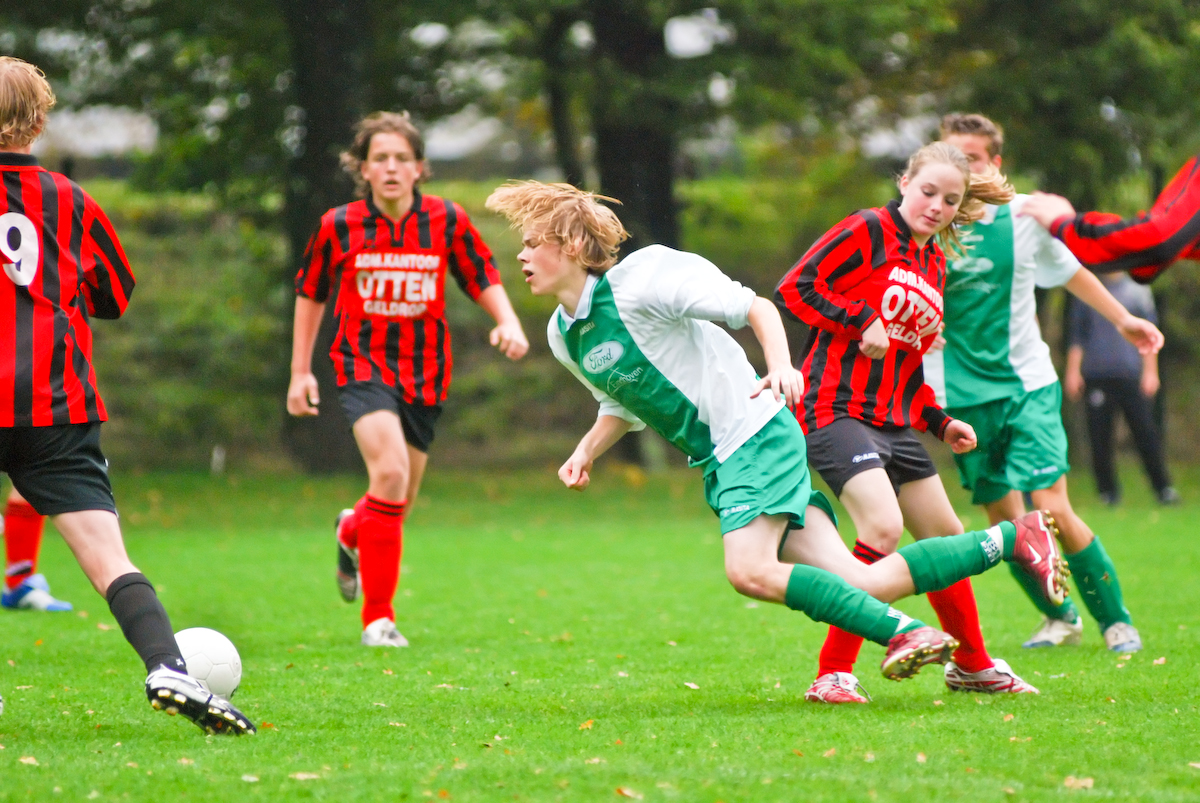
A player commits a foul by tripping an opponent during an association football match.

In sports, a foul is an inappropriate or unfair act by a player as deemed by a referee, usually violating the rules of the sport or game. A foul may be intentional or accidental, and often results in a penalty. Even though it may not be intentional, fouling can still cause serious harm or injury to opposing players, or even their own players if unaware of their surroundings during particular situations on sports. Fouls are used in many different sports. Often own teammates can clash and foul each other by accident, such as both going for and with eyes on a ball in AFL. Strategical fouls violate the traditional norms of cooperation and agreement to the essential rules and regulations of the game, or are perhaps not part of the games at all.

Individual sports may have different types of fouls. For example, in basketball, a personal foul involves illegal personal contact with an opponent. A technical foul refers to unsportsmanlike non-contact behavior, a more serious infraction than a personal foul. A flagrant foul involves unsportsmanlike contact behavior, considered the most serious foul and often resulting in ejection from the game.

In association football, a foul is an unfair act by a player as deemed by the referee. In association football or rugby, a professional foul is a deliberate act of foul play, usually to prevent an opponent scoring.

Kinjite are various fouls that a sumo wrestler might commit that will cause him to lose the bout.

Penalties awarded against fouls usually affect the outcome of the game immediately, as seen in the examples above. However, in some cases committing a foul may have further repercussions in the form of a fine (penalty), especially in professional competitions. For example, in the National Basketball Association players are given a $2000 fine each technical foul committed for the first five technical fouls committed in the regular season. Players may also receive fines up to $50,000 for committing fighting fouls. Great athletes push on the rules, norms and boundaries of their games in pursuit for victory/success, although there can be consequences for crossing lines and unwanted outcomes such as suspensions or bans from the games altogether.

Coaches are not exempt from fouls. In some cases, coaches can also receive fouls. For example, in basketball the coach can be given technical fouls or be immediately ejected from the game. Two examples of a technical foul committed by a coach are entering the court without permission from the referee or physically contacting an official. In the event of receiving two technical fouls, the coach will be ejected from the game. An example of when a coach may be immediately ejected from the game is if they commit a punching foul.

== Referee control ==
Fouls do not always affect game control, therefore referees need to find a balance for the right opportunities for risks to be let go for the game flow to continue. Risks fouls play in sports depend on the sort of action by the guilty player upon an opposing victim. Appropriate risks, that are borderline fouls, all falls down to the location on field, whether it was really intentional, the type of 'challenge' posed upon players and whether it will impact on game control and the game outcome. Referees try to eliminate unnecessary stoppages, considering the players prior behaviour and whether they have a bad reputation or continual intent to foul. Minor fouls that are often overlooked by referees as they are not jeopardising a players safety, having no intent to be reckless, careless or show excessive force. They are also overlooked when opposing players do not feel threatened of have any anticipation of the foul happening again and not purposely trying to stop play and slow down the game flow.

== Association football ==
FIFA, the governing body of football (soccer), have set rules, which is documented in the association's official handbook.

The main referee ensures that the game is played fairly and that each player follows the set rules. However, if there is an infraction, the referee has the power to stop play and take disciplinary action.

There are three types of solutions a team can be awarded when a player with possession of the ball is fouled by the defending team.

Direct Free Kick is issued when an opposing player commits a foul that is careless, reckless, or any act that will cause harm to their opponent. Most fouls occur when a defender first makes contact with the player rather than the ball. This also applies to a player that handles the ball; depending on the referees decision the offender can receive further punishment (yellow or red card).

Similar to the Direct Free Kick, the Indirect Free Kick restarts the play. The team given an Indirect Free Kick is unable to score from the spot. It first has to touch a player on the same team in order to resume play.

When a free kick is being performed, the opposing team has to be at least 10 yards from where the ball is going to be struck.

Lastly, the Penalty Kick is another form of advantage play when the opposing team disobeys the rules. However, a penalty is only awarded when the offence is committed in the opposing players own box. It is then taken in one spot, 12 yards out from the goal, regardless of where the foul was committed.

Soon after any of these free kicks have been issued, the referee has the decision to take further disciplinary action. The perpetrator is then issued either a yellow or red card, depending on the severity of the action.

As fouls are often the result of a defender failing to touch the ball while touching the opponent, the (etymologically paradox) notion is widespread that a normal foul is not incompatible with personal fairness and sportsmanship.

== Cricket ==
Certain dangerous acts are considered unfair play in cricket, such as an intentionally bowled beamer (a ball thrown at a batter above the waist, potentially at the head).

== Controversy ==
The entitlement of a sports person to commit fouls can be abused and used as an excuse to hurt or injure other players on the field. Fouls on the sporting field can be used in a malicious way to purposefully hurt or settle disputes with other players. For example, in a game against Manchester City F.C. and Manchester United F.C. held in 2002 Roy Keane claimed that he intentionally committed a foul to injure Alf-Inge Haaland, a member of the opposing team. This was done in retaliation for a match between Leeds United F.C. and Manchester United in which Haaland was a player for Leeds at that time. When Roy Keane was fouled, Haaland made fun of him and told him to get up and stop faking the injury, thus culminating into the aforementioned revenge tackle.

Another way in which fouls are controversially abused in sport is when players pretend to be fouled by another player. This results in players receiving unfair penalties and the so-called 'victims' receiving free-kicks and other rewards unjustly. One sport where this practice is common is association football. In football, players are known to perform diving, which is the practice of pretending to fall over as a result of an opponent tripping them over. Although diving produces outrage and controversy amongst many football fans, it is commonly practised amongst professionals and amateurs alike.

Referees come across these situations regularly. At such a fast tempo, they have to make a rash decision on whether or not the player performed a dive or they were legitimately fouled. A test by Peter G. Renden was done to determine if motor experience in football contributes to the ability to recognise dives in potential tackle situations. This study showed, experienced players as well as referees were able to pin point the differences. In comparison, fans and novice participants that had little experience to recognise the difference between a dive and foul showed a lower result.

Players also try to intimidate their opposing sides to give them a psychological edge. Fans are known to encourage this sort of behaviour, as part of attempts to get a reaction from their targets. Opposing sides sometimes encourage retaliations from other players, forcing them into an aggressive attitude that will lead them to perform acts of unnecessary physical conduct.

In some cases, the actual severity of fouls are not always picked up by the referee during the game. This results in the association of the sport to look into the issue further. For example, in 2013 Townsville Fire captain Rachel Flanagan was deliberately tripped by player Brigette Ardossi, although it was not seen at the time. The WNBL were considering to take further action on the unsportsmanlike foul.

== See also ==
- Penalty card
- Penalty flag
- Sportsmanship
- Violence in sports
- Foul (nautical), in nautical terms, to entangle
- Foul ball, in baseball, a batted ball that lands in foul territory
