= Armintie Price =

American basketball player (born 1985)

Armintie Herrington
Personal information
- Born: April 3, 1985 (age 41) Milwaukee, Wisconsin, U.S.
- Listed height: 5 ft 9 in (1.75 m)
- Listed weight: 132 lb (60 kg)

Career information
- High school: Myrtle (Myrtle, Mississippi)
- College: Ole Miss (2003–2007)
- WNBA draft: 2007: 1st round, 3rd overall pick
- Drafted by: Chicago Sky
- Playing career: 2007–2015
- Position: Shooting guard
- Number: 22
- Coaching career: 2009–present

Career history

Playing
- 2007–2009: Chicago Sky
- 2009–2013: Atlanta Dream
- 2014: Los Angeles Sparks
- 2015: Washington Mystics

Coaching
- 2009–2012, 2018–2022: Ole Miss (assistant)

Career highlights
- WNBA Rookie of the Year (2007); WNBA All-Rookie Team (2007); WNBA All-Defensive Second Team (2011); Kodak All-American (2007); 2× SEC Defensive Player of the Year (2005, 2007); 3× First-team All-SEC (2005–2007); Third-team All-American – AP (2007); SEC Freshman of the Year (2004); SEC All-Freshman Team (2004)
- Stats at WNBA.com
- Stats at Basketball Reference

Armintie Ada (Price) Herrington (born April 3, 1985) is an American professional basketball player who last played for the Washington Mystics of the Women's National Basketball Association (WNBA). Herrington, who played collegiately at the University of Mississippi, was drafted third overall by the Chicago Sky in the 2007 WNBA draft. She was born in Milwaukee, Wisconsin.

== High school career ==
Having moved to Myrtle, Mississippi, before high school, the 5-foot-9-inch (1.75 m) Herrington became a star player at Myrtle High School and received numerous honors, including being named to the Clarion-Ledger's Dandy Dozen (Mississippi's top twelve high school basketball players) as a senior. Herrington averaged 31.0 points, 22.0 rebounds, 6.0 assists, and 5.0 steals as a senior and helped lead Myrtle High to the 2003 Class 1A state title and to Class 1A state runner-up finishes as a sophomore and junior. Herrington, who also excelled in track, helped lead Myrtle High to the 2001, 2002 and 2003 Class 1A state championship in track and was a 15-time state champion in track as she won the 100-meter high hurdles, long jump, 200 meters, 4x100-meter relay and 4x200-meter relay her sophomore, junior and senior years. Because of her religion which stated females must wear feminine apparel (skirts), her mother encouraged her to wear a skirt throughout her high school basketball career.

== College career ==
While attending the University of Mississippi in Oxford, Mississippi, Herrington became one of the most decorated athletes of all time playing for coach Carol Ross's Ole Miss Rebels women's basketball team from 2003 to 2007. During her senior year, she averaged a team leading 18.1 points per game, which ranked second in the SEC and 32nd in the NCAA. She also led the team with 146 assists and 118 steals. Her 3.8 steals per game was first in the NCAA and SEC, while she ranked fourth in assists in the SEC with 4.8 per game Herrington is just the fifth player in NCAA history to record over 2,000 points, 1,000 rebounds, 300 assists and 300 steals joining Cheryl Miller, Chamique Holdsclaw, Tamika Catchings and Sophia Young. Herrington was named 2007 SEC Defensive Player of the Year, becoming the first player in the history of the league to win the award two times. She was a unanimous selection to the 2007 All-SEC First Team by the league coaches.

== Career statistics ==
Legend
GP	Games played	GS	Games started	MPG	Minutes per game	RPG	Rebounds per game
APG	Assists per game	SPG	Steals per game	BPG	Blocks per game	PPG	Points per game
TO	Turnovers per game	FG%	Field-goal percentage	3P%	3-point field-goal percentage	FT%	Free-throw percentage
**Bold**	Career best	°	League leader

=== WNBA ===
==== Regular season ====
Year	Team	GP	GS	MPG	FG%	3P%	FT%	RPG	APG	SPG	BPG	TO	PPG
2007	Chicago	**34**	**34**	26.3	40.9	**33.3**	51.7	**6.0**	**2.9**	1.2	0.2	1.7	7.9
2008	Chicago	**34**	11	22.4	43.8	0.0	52.0	3.7	1.7	1.1	**0.4**	1.4	6.9
2009	Chicago	22	0	14.7	38.6	0.0	57.5	2.7	1.2	0.5	0.0	0.8	3.5
2009	Atlanta	11	0	8.9	35.7	0.0	60.0	1.5	0.4	0.3	0.2	0.8	1.5
2010	Atlanta	**34**	0	16.5	38.7	0.0	59.4	3.0	1.8	0.9	0.1	1.1	4.9
2011	Atlanta	**34**	21	23.4	**51.9**	0.0	**60.8**	3.0	2.8	1.5	0.1	1.4	**8.5**
2012	Atlanta	**34**	33	26.6	50.9	0.0	60.2	3.7	2.5	1.1	0.3	1.7	8.4
2013	Atlanta	28	26	**29.9**	46.7	0.0	59.1	3.4	2.4	**2.3**	0.1	1.9	7.0
2014	Los Angeles	**34**	17	23.2	48.0	0.0	45.7	2.8	2.0	1.5	0.2	1.0	3.9
2015	Washington	25	3	10.4	41.9	0.0	40.0	1.8	1.0	0.5	0.0	**0.6**	1.7
Career	9 years, 4 teams	290	145	21.5	45.4	7.1	56.0	3.3	2.0	1.2	0.2	1.3	5.9

==== Playoffs ====
Year	Team	GP	GS	MPG	FG%	3P%	FT%	RPG	APG	SPG	BPG	TO	PPG
2009	Atlanta	2	0	15.5	33.3	0.0	57.1	3.0	2.0	2.0	0.0	1.0	5.0
2010	Atlanta	7	6	25.7	34.2	0.0	60.0	2.7	**3.6**	0.9	0.0	1.6	5.0
2011	Atlanta	**8**	**8**	**30.1**	46.8	0.0	66.7	**5.3**	3.5	1.6	0.3	1.0	7.5
2012	Atlanta	3	3	30.0	36.4	0.0	72.7	3.7	3.3	**2.3**	0.3	1.7	**8.0**
2013	Atlanta	**8**	5	27.4	51.0	0.0	63.2	4.5	2.3	1.9	0.1	0.8	7.8
2014	Los Angeles	2	0	14.5	**66.7**	0.0	**100.0**	1.0	1.0	1.0	**0.5**	2.0	2.5
2015	Washington	2	0	9.5	33.3	0.0	33.3	1.5	0.0	0.0	**0.5**	**0.5**	2.0
Career	7 years, 3 teams	32	22	25.3	43.3	0.0	62.7	3.7	2.7	1.5	0.2	1.2	6.3

=== College ===
Legend
GP	Games played	GS	Games started	MPG	Minutes per game
FG%	Field goal percentage	3P%	3-point field goal percentage	FT%	Free throw percentage
RPG	Rebounds per game	APG	Assists per game	SPG	Steals per game
BPG	Blocks per game	PPG	Points per game	**Bold**	Career high

Year	Team	GP	Points	FG%	3P%	FT%	RPG	APG	SPG	BPG	PPG
2003-04	Ole Miss	31	462	**.561**	.000	**.639**	9.4	1.7	2.5	0.2	14.9
2004-05	Ole Miss	29	485	.536	.000	.537	**10.3**	3.1	3.2	0.1	16.7
2005-06	Ole Miss	31	548	.481	**.385**	.617	9.6	3.5	3.4	0.2	17.7
2006-07	Ole Miss	**35**	**671**	.457	.196	.607	8.8	**4.7**	**3.7**	**0.5**	**19.2**
Career		126	2,166	.500	.233	.600	9.5	3.3	3.2	0.2	17.2

== WNBA career ==
The day after her 22nd birthday, Herrington was chosen with the third overall pick by the Chicago Sky, an expansion team of the WNBA. Herrington became the first Ole Miss player selected in the first round of the draft's eleven-year history. She is also just the second Lady Rebel to be selected in the draft (Saundra Jackson was a third-round pick in 2002). On September 8, 2007, Herrington was named 2007 WNBA Rookie of the Year (as Armintie Price).

She played for Mallorca in Spain during the 2008–09 WNBA off-season.

Herrington was traded to the Atlanta Dream on August 12, 2009, in exchange for Tamera Young. In 2014, she joined the Los Angeles Sparks. On February 10, 2015, Herrington signed with the Washington Mystics.

== See also ==
- List of NCAA Division I women's basketball career steals leaders
