= Brigitte Ardossi =

Australian basketball player

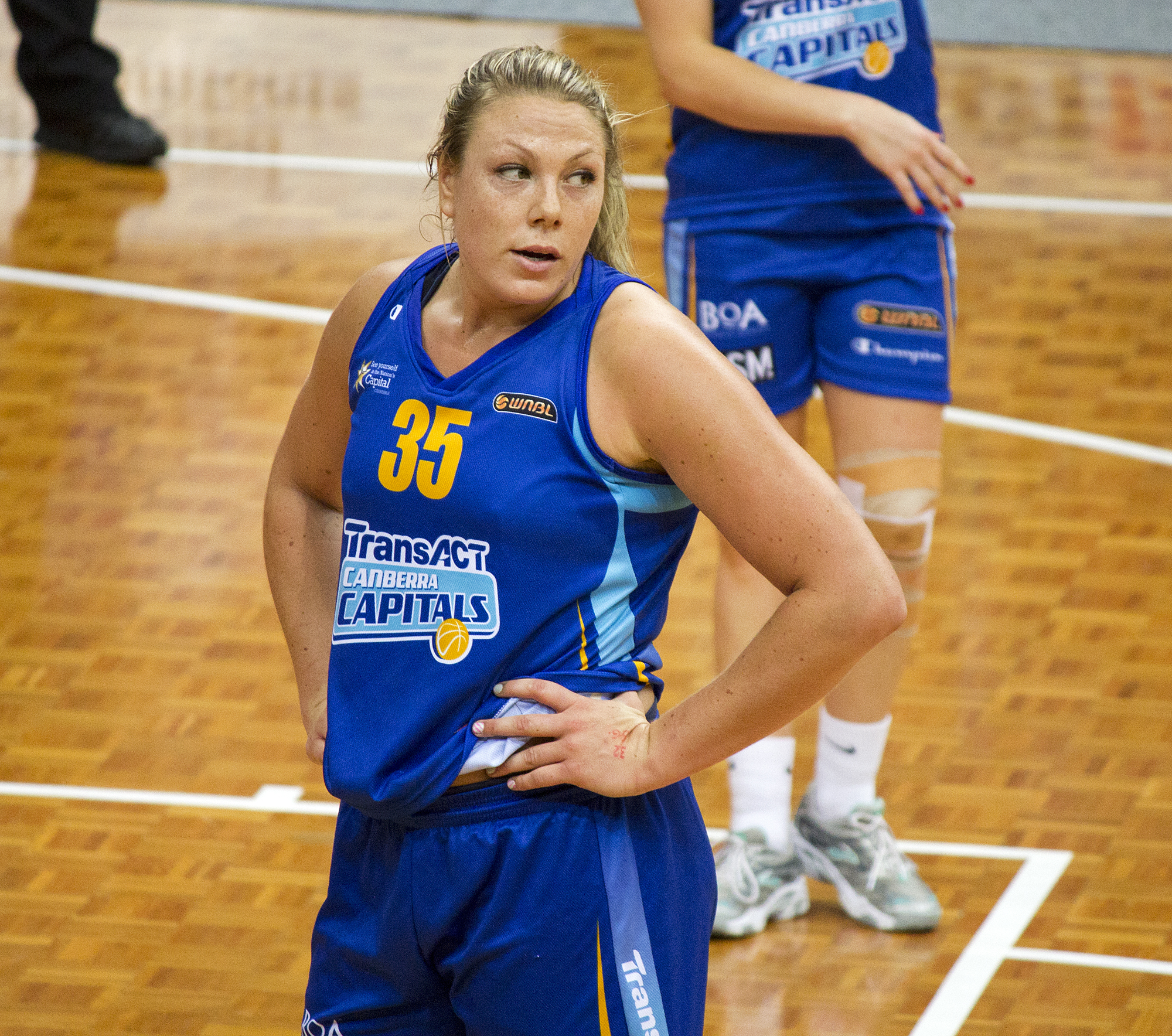
- Ardossi with the Canberra Capitals in 2012

Personal information
- Born: 7 August 1987 (age 39) Williamstown, Victoria
- Listed height: 1.88 m (6 ft 2 in)

Career information
- College: Georgia Tech (2006–2010)
- WNBA draft: 2010: 2nd round, 21st overall pick
- Drafted by: Atlanta Dream
- Playing career: 2010–2014
- Position: Forward

Career history
- 2010–2011: Cote d'Opale Basket Calais
- 2011–2013: Canberra Capitals
- 2013–2014: Dandenong Rangers
- Stats at Basketball Reference

Brigitte Ardossi (born 7 August 1987) is an Australian former basketball player. She attended Georgia Tech, where she played basketball for the Georgia Tech Yellow Jackets women's basketball team all four years that she was at the school. While there, she earned a number of honours related to her on court performance. In 2010, she was drafted by the Atlanta Dream of the WNBA. After a season in France in 2010–11, she played three seasons in the Women's National Basketball League (WNBL) between 2011 and 2014.

== Personal ==
Brigitte Ardossi was born on 7 August 1987 in Williamstown, Victoria. She is 188 centimetres (74 in) tall. As a youngster, she also competed in athletic events including the shot put. She set a record in the shot put in Newport when she was eight years old. She also played netball, but put aside the sport in order to pursue basketball. She has played Australian rules football. She has a brother, Josh Ardossi, who competed for the Australian men's national lacrosse team and was a member of the University of Maryland's lacrosse team. Her mother played competitive netball in a state based league. She attended Mac.Robertson Girls' High School.

As a student at Georgia Tech, Ardossi undertook a management major. In the fall of 2008, she was named on the Dean's list for her academic performance.

== Basketball ==
=== Juniors ===
As a member of Werribee Devils in 2004, Ardossi was honoured during Big V League/VBL Awards by being named the leading rebounder in the premiere women category. In a July 2005 game playing for Werribee, she scored 23 points and had 17 rebounds in a game against the Whittlesea City Pacers. As a member of Werribee, the local press referred to her as the team's gunner. She later played for the Melbourne Tigers for a year following her time with Werribee.

Ardossi was a member of the Victorian U18 team that competed at the 2005 Pacific School Games where they earned a gold medal. She was named a member of the All-Tournament team by tournament organisers. Ardossi was a member of the silver winning Victorian side at the 2005-06 U20 Australian National Junior Championships held in Perth.

=== Georgia Tech ===
Ardossi played for Georgia Tech for four years as a power forward. According to her coach, she earned a spot on the court because she is a player "who's always in the right position, who will be physical around the basket, fight for rebounds, draw charges and play defense. " As a basketball player, she earned several honours including being named to the 2010 Second-Team All-ACC and being named the 2010 State of Georgia Women's Basketball Player of the Year. During all four years as a member of the team, Georgia Tech qualified for the women's NCAA tournament. As a senior, she was part of the team that had had the best record in the school's history. By the end of her time with the team, she had scored over 1,000 points, only the 24th female player in the school's history to do this. She started in eighty-two of the one hundred and thirty games she played in during her time with the team. In January 2010, she was named the ACC Player of the week. At the time, her team was ranked 25th in the nation and Ardossi had the highest percentage for making free throws in the conference at 80%. Other honours she earned in 2010 while a member of the team include being named the 2010 FIU Sun & Fun Classic MVP, being named to the 2010 LIU Turkey Classic All-Tournament Team, being named the Georgia Women's Basketball Player of the Year by the Atlanta Tipoff Club. In all, she played 129 games for Georgia Tech, 33 games in 2007/2007 and 32 games in the three following years. Of these 129 games, she started in 82 of them.

=== Georgia Tech statistics ===
Legend
GP	Games played	GS	Games started	MPG	Minutes per game
FG%	Field goal percentage	3P%	3-point field goal percentage	FT%	Free throw percentage
RPG	Rebounds per game	APG	Assists per game	SPG	Steals per game
BPG	Blocks per game	PPG	Points per game	**Bold**	Career high

Year	Team	GP	Points	FG%	3P%	FT%	RPG	APG	SPG	BPG	PPG
2006-07	Georgia Tech	**33**	99	**50.0%**	0.0%	61.8%	2.5	0.8	0.8	0.2	3.0
2007-08	Georgia Tech	32	124	**50.0%**	0.0%	61.5%	2.8	0.4	0.8	0.2	3.9
2008-09	Georgia Tech	32	246	46.4%	0.0%	81.9%	4.5	0.9	1.1	0.4	7.7
2009-10	Georgia Tech	**33**	**532**	48.4%	0.0%	**82.9%**	**7.3**	**1.9**	**2.0**	**0.4**	**16.1**
Career		130	1001	48.3%	0.0%	77.6%	4.3	1.0	1.1	0.3	7.7

=== WNBA ===
In 2010, she was drafted 21st overall in the WNBA draft by the Atlanta Dream. The Dream waived her before the season started.

=== Ligue Féminine de Basket ===
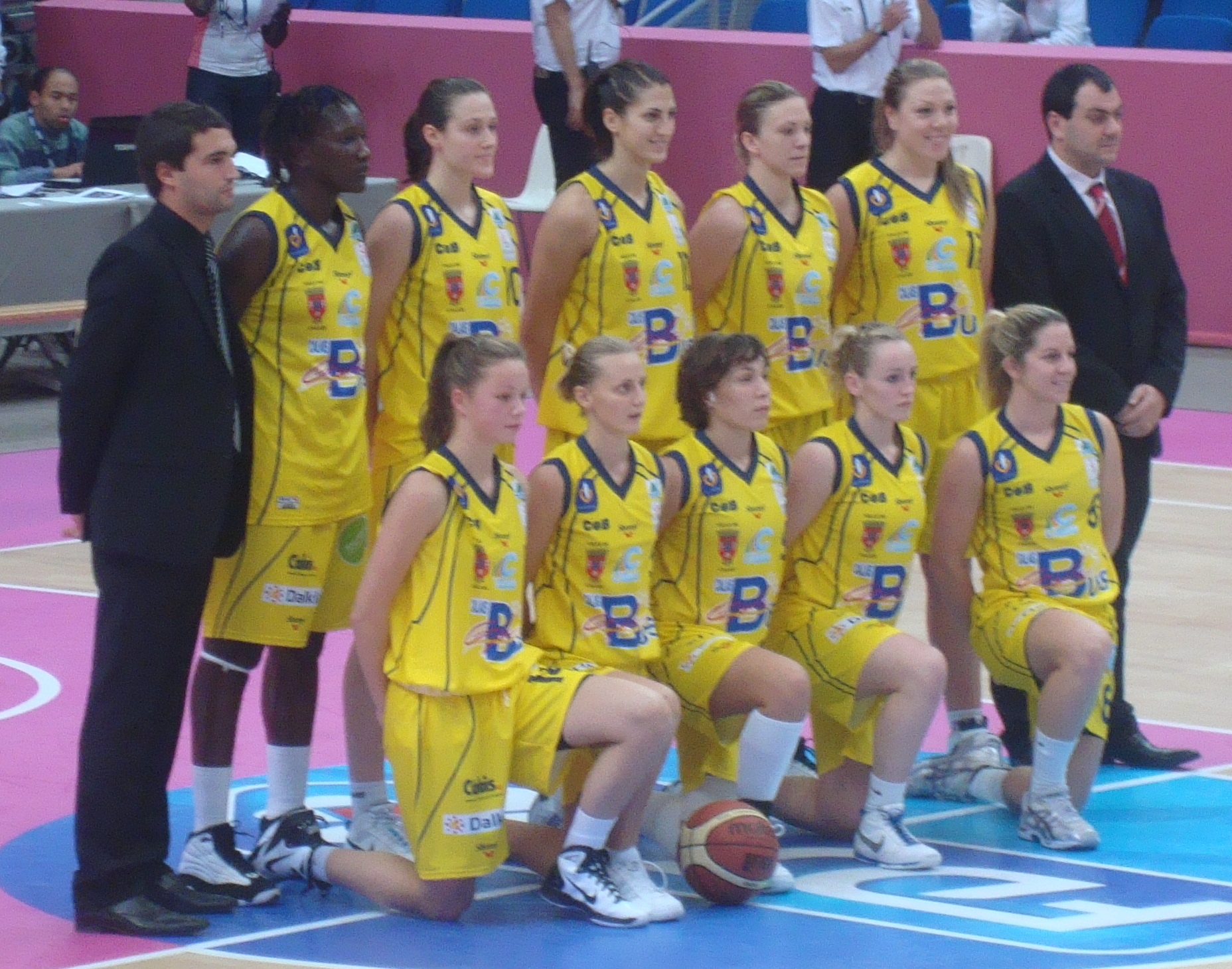
Ardossi (top right) with COB Calais

In 2010–11, Ardossi played for COB Calais in Ligue féminine de basket (LFB) in France.

=== Canberra Capitals ===
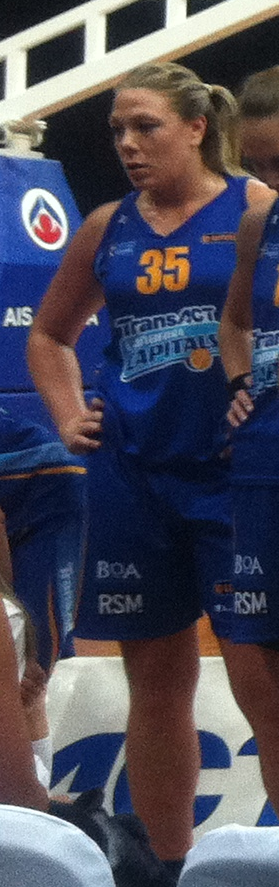
Ardossi with the Capitals in January 2012

In July 2011, Ardossi signed with the Canberra Capitals. She participated in the team's first training session for the season on 13 September 2011 at the Belconnen Basketball Centre. She was expected to provide some assistance to Marianna Tolo and allow Carly Wilson to play her normal position more regularly. During the pre-season, the Capitals coach, Carrie Graf, has characterised her play as assertive and confident. She played in the first game of the season for the Canberra Capitals when they played the Sydney Uni Flames. In an early December game against the West Coast Waves, she scored 19 points. This was the highest number of points she had ever scored in an WNBL game. In a December loss to Adelaide, she scored 12 points. On 18 December 2011, 85–78 victory over the Bulleen Boomers, she scored 18 points, and was one of Canberra's top three scorers. By the middle of the season, the local newspaper asserted that Ardossi understood her role with the team. Tolo was injured in the game against the Boomers before the break and Ardossi was expected to pick up the slack after the post holiday break while Tolo fully recovered.

=== Sandringham ===
Ardossi played for the Sandringham Sabres during the 2011 SEABL season. 14 games into the season, her team had yet to win a game but she had still put up an average of 14 points, and 9 rebounds per game.

Brigitte Ardossi Gallery
Ardossi is one of several players warming up before a 15 October 2011 game against the Townsville Fire.

Porter takes the floor to relieve Tolo during a 15 October 2011 game against the Townsville Fire. Ardossi shoots free throws.
