= Sancho Lyttle =

Vincentian basketball player (born 1983)

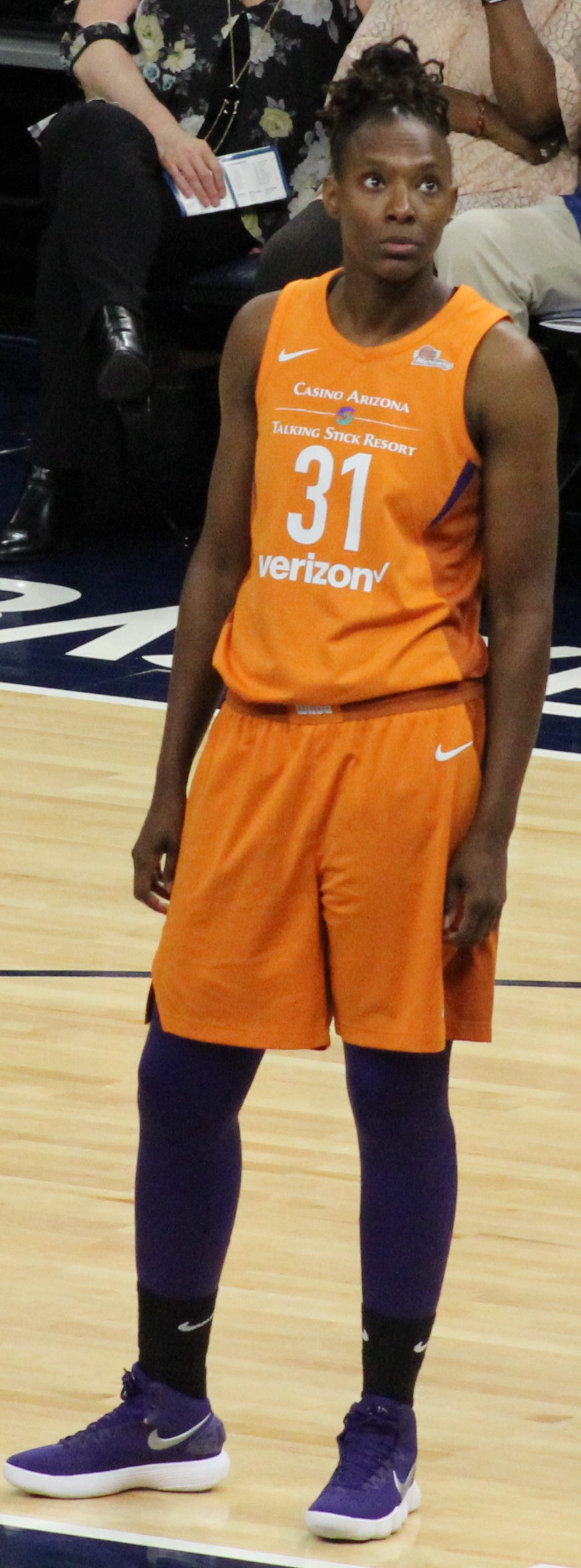

Personal information
- Born: September 20, 1983 (age 43) The Grenadines
- Listed height: 6 ft 5 in (1.96 m)
- Listed weight: 175 lb (79 kg)

Career information
- College: Clarendon College (2001–2003); Houston (2003–2005)
- WNBA draft: 2005: 1st round, 5th overall pick
- Drafted by: Houston Comets
- Playing career: 2005–2019
- Position: Power forward / center

Career history
- 2005–2008: Houston Comets
- 2006–2009: CB Puig d'en Valls
- 2009–2017: Atlanta Dream
- 2009–2011: CB Avenida
- 2011–2012: Ros Casares Valencia
- 2012–2015: Galatasaray
- 2015–2019: UMMC Ekaterinburg
- 2018–2019: Phoenix Mercury

Career highlights
- 2× WNBA All-Star (2009, 2010); 2× WNBA steals leader (2011, 2015); FIBA Europe Women's Player of the Year (2013); 4× EuroLeague champion (2011, 2012, 2014, 2016); Triple Crown (2014); 2× Spanish League champion (2011, 2012); 2× Turkish League champion (2014, 2015); 2× Turkish Cup champion (2013, 2014); 2× Russian League champion (2016, 2017); 2× Russian Cup champion (2017); First-team All-CUSA (2005); NCAA season rebounding leader (2005)
- Stats at WNBA.com
- Stats at Basketball Reference

Sancho Lyttle (born September 20, 1983) is a Vincentian-Spanish former professional basketball player for the WNBA. Combining the WNBA and the European season, she has won six domestic leagues and four Euroleague titles with four teams in three countries. She was born in Saint Vincent and the Grenadines and was granted Spanish nationality in June 2010. With the Spanish basketball team she has won four medals between 2010 and 2017.

== Early life ==
Sancho Lyttle was born to Evelyn Little and Ian Cain. Members of her family spell their surname 'Lyttle' or 'Little'. Sancho has a younger brother, Xavier Little. Sancho attended St. Vincent Girls' High School where she played netball and ran various Track and Field events. She never played basketball until prompted to do so after her move to the United States. She and three other girls from her country were requested by her Junior College and current assistant coach for the University of Houston Women's team Wade Scott who offered to teach them how to play the game of basketball.

== College career ==
Sancho Lyttle played collegiate basketball at Clarendon College before transferring to the University of Houston from 2003 to 2005 where she currently holds the record for single season rebound average (2004–2005), offensive rebounds (04-05) and most rebounds in a single season (04-05). She also holds the career record for highest rebounding average.

== WNBA career ==
When the Houston Comets folded in 2008, Lyttle was selected first in the dispersal draft by the Atlanta Dream.

She played the power forward position for the Phoenix Mercury in the WNBA. Over her career, Lyttle has scored over 1,500 points, collected over 1,000 rebounds, and had 200 assists, 242 steals, and 96 blocks through six seasons. She was the fifth overall draft pick in the 2005 WNBA draft out of Houston.

In 2010, Lyttle had career highs in points and rebounds with 27 and 20, respectively. She was hospitalized for a number of days in 2010 after being knocked unconscious for a little over a minute by an incidental elbow during a game. Lyttle recovered and played 13 days later.

On February 1, 2018, Lyttle signed with the Phoenix Mercury after spending the previous nine seasons with the Atlanta Dream. However, her season ended early when she tore her ACL on June 30, 2018. In September 2019, Little announced her retirement after 15 WNBA seasons.

== Euroleague career ==
Simultaneously to her WNBA career, she has played in Spain, Turkey and Russia, winning one Euroleague and at least one domestic league playing for every club. She also played for Russian team, UMMC Ekaterinburg.

== National team career ==
Lyttle played her first and only tournament with native Saint Vincent and the Grenadines in 2004, at the Caribbean championship.

After her naturalization was granted in 2010, she made her debut with the senior Spanish team in 2010, days after turning 27. Up to 2017, she had 45 caps with 15.6 PPG and 9.5 RPP, participating in two World Championships and three European Championships. After helping the team qualify for the 2016 Olympics in Rio in mid-June, she missed the Games after breaking her toe in mid-July playing for the Atlanta Dream:

- 2010 World Championship
- 9th 2011 Eurobasket
- 2013 Eurobasket (MVP)
- 2014 World Championship
- 2017 Eurobasket

== Career statistics ==
Legend
GP	Games played	GS	Games started	MPG	Minutes per game	FG%	Field goal percentage	3P%	3-point field goal percentage
FT%	Free throw percentage	RPG	Rebounds per game	APG	Assists per game	SPG	Steals per game	BPG	Blocks per game
TO	Turnovers per game	PPG	Points per game	**Bold**	Career high	°	Led the league	*	Led Division I

=== WNBA ===
==== Regular season ====
WNBA regular season statistics
Year	Team	GP	GS	MPG	FG%	3P%	FT%	RPG	APG	SPG	BPG	TO	PPG
2005	Houston	33	0	13.9	**.584**	—	.550	3.8	0.5	0.6	0.1	0.7	4.2
2006	Houston	29	2	13.1	.460	—	.619	3.9	0.3	0.9	0.1	**0.6**	3.7
2007	Houston	31	25	16.3	.494	—	.569	5.3	1.0	1.2	0.6	1.3	5.9
2008	Houston	27	9	18.1	.582	—	.745	6.1	0.9	1.4	1.0	1.2	8.2
2009	Atlanta	**34**	31	27.4	.507	.000	.743	7.5	1.5	2.0	0.6	1.9	13.0
2010	Atlanta	32	31	29.1	.484	—	.725	**9.9**	2.2	1.7	0.6	2.0	12.8
2011	Atlanta	22	19	26.2	.448	.286	.709	6.3	2.1	**2.4**°	0.5	2.0	10.0
2012	Atlanta	**34**	**34**	**31.6**	.412	.255	.758	7.6	**2.5**	**2.4**	0.7	2.6	14.0
2013	Atlanta	6	6	30.0	.529	.400	.667	8.5	**2.5**	2.3	**1.3**	2.2	**14.3**
2014	Atlanta	**34**	**34**	31.3	.459	.273	.663	9.0	2.4	2.2	0.6	1.4	12.2
2015	Atlanta	24	24	30.0	.200	.477	.736	8.3	2.2	2.3°	0.6	1.6	10.3
2016	Atlanta	19	18	30.1	.416	.222	.760	7.8	1.8	2.1	1.0	1.2	7.6
2017	Atlanta	29	28	28.3	.435	.444	.759	7.1	1.6	1.6	0.6	1.3	6.4
2018	Phoenix	18	18	23.3	.540	**.545**	**.875**	5.3	1.4	0.9	0.4	0.9	7.9
2019	Phoenix	20	2	12.5	.419	.250	.625	2.9	0.3	0.6	0.3	**0.6**	2.9
**Career**	15 years, 3 teams	392	281	23.9	.473	.255	.704	6.6	1.5	1.6	0.6	1.4	8.9
**Career**	All-Star	1	0	12.0	.500	.000	—	8.0	3.0	0.0	0.0	0.0	6.0

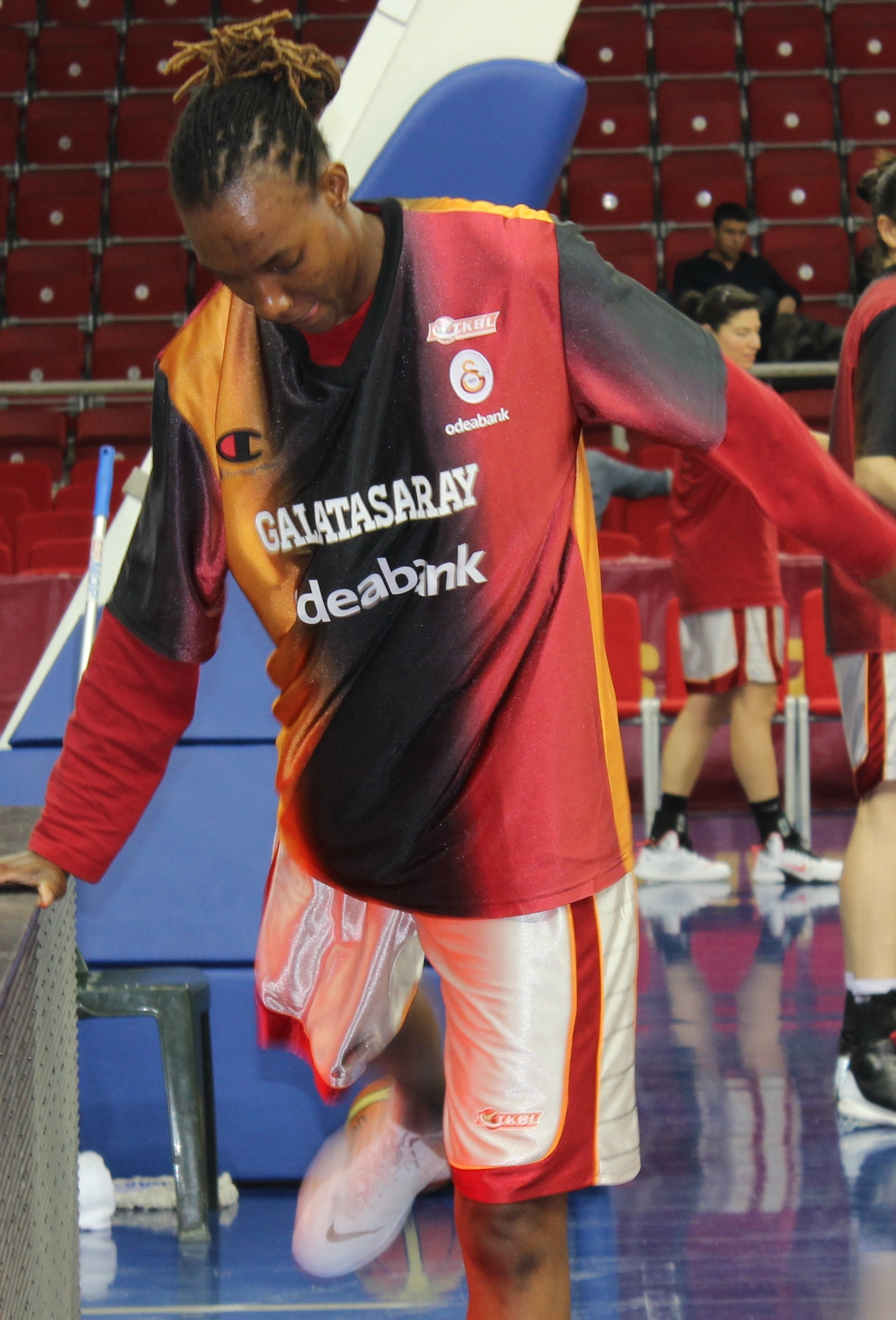
Lyttle in 2014

==== Playoffs ====
WNBA playoff statistics
Year	Team	GP	GS	MPG	FG%	3P%	FT%	RPG	APG	SPG	BPG	TO	PPG
2005	Houston	5	0	6.8	.600	—	.667	2.4	0.0	0.4	0.0	**0.0**	2.0
2006	Houston	2	0	15.5	**.800**	—	.750	5.0	0.0	0.5	0.0	1.0	5.5
2009	Atlanta	2	2	25.5	.412	.000	.429	5.0	2.0	2.0	0.0	2.0	8.5
2010	Atlanta	7	7	25.4	.500	—	**.889**	9.6	1.7	2.0	**1.1**	1.9	10.6
2011	Atlanta	**8**	**8**	29.3	.391	.000	.750	7.5	1.0	2.3	0.6	1.9	10.0
2012	Atlanta	3	3	34.3	.362	.000	.750	7.0	0.7	**3.0**	0.7	1.7	**12.3**
2014	Atlanta	3	3	**36.3**	.394	.000	.667	**11.3**	**3.3**	1.0	1.0	2.7	9.3
2019	Phoenix	1	0	17.0	.500	**.500**	—	1.0	1.0	1.0	0.0	2.0	9.0
**Career**	8 years, 3 teams	31	23	24.4	.425	.083	.761	6.9	1.2	1.7	0.6	1.6	8.6

=== Euroleague ===
Euroleague champion

Euroleague statistics
Season	Team	GP	MPP	PPP	RPP	APP
2009-10	(Spain) Halcón Avenida	15	30.5	17.6	10.8	1.6
2010-11	(Spain) Halcón Avenida	16	31.1	13.9	9.8	1.3
2011-12	(Spain) Ros Casares	17	26.8	12.8	7.4	2.4
2012-13	(Turkey) Galatasaray S.K.	17	25.6	11.6	7.2	1.3
2013-14	(Turkey) Galatasaray S.K.	14	28.4	13.6	8.3	1.8
2014-15	(Turkey) Galatasaray S.K.	13	30.5	11.1	9.1	1.9
2015-16	(Russia) UMMC Ekaterinburg	17	23.8	7.8	7.6	1.9
2016-17	(Russia) UMMC Ekaterinburg	13	20.6	5.8	5.9	1.8
Total		122	27.1	11.7	8.2	1.7

=== College ===
College statistics
Year	Team	GP	GS	MPG	FG%	3P%	FT%	RPG	APG	SPG	BPG	TO	PPG
2003–04	Houston	**32**	-	29.6	**52.5**	0.0	54.5	9.3	1.1	2.3	0.8	**2.4**	16.5
2004–05	Houston	30	-	**33.4**	48.1	0.0	**68.8**	**12.1***	**1.5**	**3.1**	**1.0**	2.5	**18.8**
**Career**		62	-	31.5	50.2	0.0	61.9	10.7	1.3	2.7	0.9	2.5	17.6

== Awards and achievements ==
- 2009, 2010 WNBA All-Star
- Bronze medal in 2010 FIBA World Championship for Women
- Named to the 2010 FIBA World Championship for Women All-Tournament Team
- Gold medal in EuroBasket Women 2013
- FIBA Europe Women's Player of the Year (2013)
- 2014—FIBA World Championship All-Star Five
- Silver medal in 2014 FIBA World Championship for Women

== See also ==
- List of WNBA career steals leaders

Preceded by Céline Dumerc	FIBA Europe Women's Player of the Year; 2013	Succeeded by Alba Torrens
