= Coco Miller =

American basketball player (born 1978)

Personal information
- Born: September 6, 1978 (age 48) Rochester, Minnesota, U.S.
- Listed height: 5 ft 9 in (1.75 m)
- Listed weight: 140 lb (64 kg)

Career information
- High school: Mayo (Rochester, Minnesota)
- College: Georgia (1997–2001)
- WNBA draft: 2001: 1st round, 9th overall pick
- Drafted by: Washington Mystics
- Playing career: 2001–2012
- Position: Guard

Career history
- 2001–2008: Washington Mystics
- 2009–2011: Atlanta Dream
- 2012: Los Angeles Sparks

Career highlights
- WNBA Most Improved Player Award (2002); James E. Sullivan Award (1999); 2× First-team All-SEC (1999, 2001); SEC All-Freshman Team (1998); Co-Minnesota Miss Basketball (1997)

Career WNBA statistics
- Points: 2,032 (5.8 ppg)
- Rebounds: 750 (2.1 rpg)
- Assists: 503 (1.4 apg)
- Stats at WNBA.com
- Stats at Basketball Reference
Medals
Women's basketball
Representing United States
World University Games
Silver medal – second place	1999 Palma de Mallorca	Team competition

Colleen Mary "Coco" Miller (born September 6, 1978) is an American former professional basketball player. She is the identical twin sister of fellow WNBA player Kelly Miller.

== Early life ==
Born in Rochester, Minnesota, Coco played basketball with her sister at Mayo High School, and made it to the championship, where she lost in the finals. The twins also helped their school go 27–0 and win the Minnesota state's class 4A championship. Miller was named a WBCA All-American. She participated in the WBCA High School All-America Game where she scored eight points.

== College career ==
The twins went to University of Georgia, where they both majored in biology and won a series of awards, including the James E. Sullivan Award, given to the nation's top amateur athlete. They earned that award in 1999, becoming the first pair of twins to earn the award, and joining Carl Lewis, Greg Louganis, Bill Walton, Bill Bradley, Kurt Thomas, Jackie Joyner-Kersee and Janet Evans as recipients of the award.

Coco was among the top ten in that school's list among women basketball players in assists and steals. She participated in the World University Games, helping her team to a silver medal. She finished her college career fifth among SEC women in scoring at 16.6, second in free throw percentage at .743% from the free throw line, and eighth in steals with 160. She was a finalist for the Naismith award as the player of the year during her final college season.

=== Georgia statistics ===
Legend
GP	Games played	GS	Games started	MPG	Minutes per game
FG%	Field goal percentage	3P%	3-point field goal percentage	FT%	Free throw percentage
RPG	Rebounds per game	APG	Assists per game	SPG	Steals per game
BPG	Blocks per game	PPG	Points per game	**Bold**	Career high

Year	Team	GP	Points	FG%	FT%	RPG	APG	SPG	BPG	PPG
98	Georgia	27	432	43.1%	67.6%	**4.6**	**3.9**	1.8	0.1	16.0
99	Georgia	34	**626**	**49.1%**	76.4%	3.9	2.3	1.6	0.1	**18.4**
00	Georgia	**36**	555	44.2%	77.6%	3.2	3.2	1.6	0.1	15.4
01	Georgia	33	518	45.8%	**83.9%**	4.1	3.1	**2.0**	**0.2**	15.7
Career		130	2131	47.5%	76.7%	3.9	3.0	1.7	0.1	16.4

== USA Basketball ==
Miller played on the team representing the US at the 1999 World University Games held in Palma de Mallorca, Spain. The team had a 4–2 record and earned the silver medal. Miller averaged 8.3 points per game.

== WNBA career ==
In 2001, Coco and Kelly entered the WNBA draft. Coco was selected by the Washington Mystics 9th overall in the 1st round, where she averaged 6.4 points, 2.4 rebounds and 1.7 assists per game in her rookie season. She played 250 total regular season matches for the Mystics through the end of the 2008 season, just nine short of Murriel Page's club record of 259.

On May 11, 2009, Coco Miller was waived by the Mystics; four days later she was signed by the WNBA's Atlanta Dream.

Her role in 2009 was as support and mentor for rookie point guard Shalee Lehning.

In the 2010 regular season she was sent further down the depth chart, behind Lehning and her sister, newly acquired by the Dream. However, after Kelly Miller's ankle injury, Coco received more playing time. She started the first game of the Eastern Conference Semifinals against her former team, the Washington Mystics, and in this game she scored 21 points.

== NWBL career ==
After the 2002 WNBA season, both sisters played for the Birmingham Power of the National Women's Basketball League (NWBL).

== International career ==
- 2002–2003: Fenerbahçe Istanbul (Turkey)
- 2003–2004: Fenerbahçe Istanbul (Turkey)
- 2006–2007: Lattes-Maurin Montpellier (LFB, France)

== WNBA career statistics ==
Legend
GP	Games played	GS	Games started	MPG	Minutes per game	RPG	Rebounds per game
APG	Assists per game	SPG	Steals per game	BPG	Blocks per game	PPG	Points per game
TO	Turnovers per game	FG%	Field-goal percentage	3P%	3-point field-goal percentage	FT%	Free-throw percentage
**Bold**	Career best	°	League leader

=== Regular season ===
Year	Team	GP	GS	MPG	FG%	3P%	FT%	RPG	APG	SPG	BPG	TO	PPG
2001	Washington	20	0	6.9	.325	.333	.545	0.5	0.4	0.3	0.0	**0.7**	1.7
2002	Washington	32	32	28.3	.433	.375	.821	3.6	**2.6**	1.0	0.1	1.8	9.3
2003	Washington	33	**33**	**32.6**	.450	.360	.698	**3.8**	**2.6**	**1.2**	**0.2**	1.6	**12.5**
2004	Washington	33	8	19.3	.431	.263	.786	1.9	1.3	0.6	0.1	0.8	4.8
2005	Washington	**34**	4	14.7	.425	.375	.800	1.7	1.3	0.8	0.1	0.8	4.5
2006	Washington	**34**	4	19.4	**.491**	**.400**	.897	2.7	1.7	1.0	0.1	1.4	6.1
2007	Washington	30	2	15.2	.405	**.400**	**1.000**	1.6	0.8	0.6	0.1	1.0	4.0
2008	Washington	**34**	6	20.9	.355	.283	.625	2.5	1.4	0.8	**0.2**	1.7	5.3
2009	Atlanta	**34**	5	12.0	.410	.296	.885	1.5	1.0	0.4	0.1	0.9	3.9
2010	Atlanta	27	0	7.3	.400	.192	.857	0.6	0.8	0.2	0.0	**0.7**	3.1
2011	Atlanta	31	5	17.4	.432	.333	.541	1.9	1.4	0.6	0.0	1.0	7.3
2012	Los Angeles	10	1	14.1	.297	.333	**1.000**	2.7	1.1	0.2	0.0	1.3	2.6
Career	12 years, 3 teams	352	100	18.1	.423	.336	.764	2.1	1.4	0.7	0.1	1.2	5.8

=== Playoffs ===
Year	Team	GP	GS	MPG	FG%	3P%	FT%	RPG	APG	SPG	BPG	TO	PPG
2002	Washington	5	5	**32.6**	.420	.545	.600	**3.0**	2.4	0.4	0.0	1.4	**10.8**
2004	Washington	3	0	17.0	.368	.000	**1.000**	2.3	0.7	**1.7**	0.0	0.7	5.3
2006	Washington	2	0	18.5	.467	.500	.250	**3.0**	1.0	0.5	0.0	2.0	8.0
2009	Atlanta	2	0	6.5	**.600**	**1.000**	.000	0.0	1.0	0.0	0.0	**0.5**	3.5
2010	Atlanta	7	**7**	25.7	.391	.263	.789	2.7	**3.3**	1.3	0.0	2.0	10.6
2011	Atlanta	**8**	0	8.0	.200	.200	.500	1.3	0.9	0.5	0.0	**0.5**	1.3
Career	6 years, 2 teams	27	12	18.8	.388	.368	.676	2.1	1.8	0.8	0.0	1.2	6.6
