= Shalee Lehning =

American basketball player (born 1986)

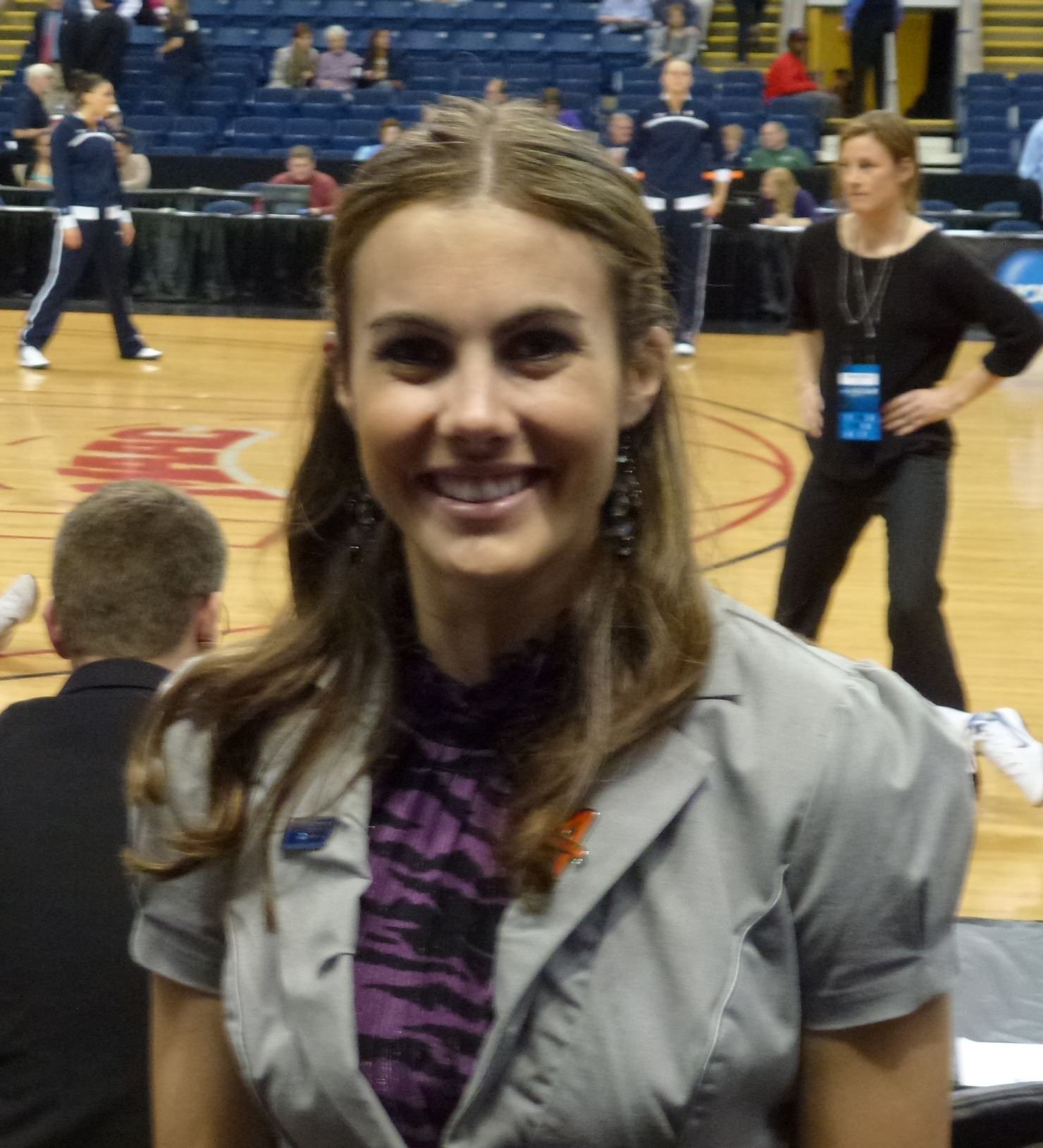

Personal information
- Born: October 27, 1986 (age 40) Liberal, Kansas, U.S.
- Listed height: 5 ft 9 in (1.75 m)
- Listed weight: 140 lb (64 kg)

Career information
- High school: Sublette (Sublette, Kansas)
- College: Kansas State (2005–2009)
- WNBA draft: 2009: 2nd round, 25th overall pick
- Drafted by: Atlanta Dream
- Playing career: 2009–2011
- Position: Guard
- Number: 5
- Coaching career: 2009–2015

Career history

Playing
- 2009–2011: Atlanta Dream

Coaching
- 2009–2014: Kansas State (assistant)
- 2014–2015: Northern Colorado (Associate HC)

Career highlights
- First-team All-Big 12 (2008, 2009); Miss Kansas Basketball (2005); Kansas Gatorade Player of the Year (2005)
- Stats at WNBA.com
- Stats at Basketball Reference

Shalee Lehning (born October 27, 1986) is an American former professional basketball player who played for the Atlanta Dream of the WNBA. She was associate head coach at the University of Northern Colorado under head coach Kamie Ethridge.

== Playing career ==
=== High school ===
Lehning was a four-year letterwinner and starter under coach Barry Lucas at Sublette High School. She ranks as the fourth all-time leading scorer in Kansas Girls Basketball history with 2,510 career points. Additionally, she holds the state all-time career records for rebounds (1,336), assists (804) and steals (543). She holds the school records for career scoring, rebounding, assists and steals. The Sublette Lady Larks became the first team in class 2A history to post back-to-back undefeated seasons with a record of 52–0 and two state championships in 2004 and 2005. As a senior, she averaged 30.6 points, 15.0 rebounds, 8.8 assists and 5.3 steals per game. She was named Gatorade Player of the Year and Miss Kansas Basketball Player of the Year. She was also a four-time KBCA all-state first team selection and a two-time Hutchinson News Athlete of the Year. At the Hugoton, Red & Blue Classic Tournament, she was a four-time Most Valuable Player. The Wichita Eagle and Topeka Capital Journal named her all-state twice. Additionally, she was a four-time Southwest Kansas all-area first team pick by the Garden City Telegram and Dodge City Daily Globe. Twice, she appeared at the Miss Basketball Showcase All-Tournament Team. In addition to basketball, she lettered in volleyball and track and field.

=== Kansas State ===
Lehning holds the Kansas State school record and is fifth in Big 12 in career assists with 710. She ranks seventh in school history for career steals with 213 and ranks fourth in school history in career rebounds with 823. She is the only player in Big 12 history to register 1,000 points, 800 rebounds and 700 assists. She has had 48 double figure scoring games, 27 double figure rebound games and 20 double digit assist games. Her 17 career double doubles ranks sixth in school history. In addition, she holds the K-State and Big 12 record for career triple-doubles (4) and triple-doubles in a single season (2). Among active players, she started 110 consecutive games, ranking second in the nation.

=== Kansas State statistics ===
Legend
GP	Games played	GS	Games started	MPG	Minutes per game
FG%	Field goal percentage	3P%	3-point field goal percentage	FT%	Free throw percentage
RPG	Rebounds per game	APG	Assists per game	SPG	Steals per game
BPG	Blocks per game	PPG	Points per game	**Bold**	Career high

Year	Team	GP	Points	FG%	3P%	FT%	RPG	APG	SPG	BPG	PPG
2005–06	Kansas State	**34**	239	48.5	22.2	59.4	6.6	5.6	1.8	**0.4**	7.0
2006–07	Kansas State	**34**	269	51.3	28.6	63.4	6.9	5.3	1.6	0.1	7.9
2007–08	Kansas State	32	**360**	**52.9**	26.0	**71.5**	**7.6**	6.3	**2.3**	0.2	**11.3**
2008–09	Kansas State	30	321	52.2	**28.9**	66.7	7.0	**7.6**	1.6	0.2	10.7
Career	Kansas State	130	1189	51.4	26.4	65.7	7.0	6.2	1.8	0.2	9.1

=== Atlanta Dream ===
Lehning was selected in the second round, 25th overall by the Atlanta Dream. Shalee played in her first WNBA game on May 27. It was a 76–73 victory against the Connecticut Sun. She played nine minutes, and had three assists and one steal.

=== WNBA career statistics ===
==== Regular season ====
Year	Team	GP	GS	MPG	FG%	3P%	FT%	RPG	APG	SPG	BPG	TO	PPG
2009	Atlanta	**34**	20	20.8	38.7	20.0	**77.4**	2.3	3.7	0.5	0.1	1.6	3.0
2010	Atlanta	33	**33**	**23.5**	45.3	36.1	46.7	**2.7**	**4.8**	**0.8**	**0.2**	1.8	**3.7**
2011	Atlanta	18	0	12.1	**48.1**	**44.4**	61.5	1.3	2.3	0.4	0.1	**1.5**	2.1
Career	3 years, 1 team	85	53	20.0	42.9	30.7	62.2	2.3	3.8	0.6	0.1	1.7	3.1

==== Playoffs ====
Year	Team	GP	GS	MPG	FG%	3P%	FT%	RPG	APG	SPG	BPG	TO	PPG
2010	Atlanta	7	0	13.1	36.8	25.0	50.0	1.9	2.6	0.4	0.0	0.4	2.9
Career	1 year, 1 team	7	0	13.1	36.8	25.0	50.0	1.9	2.6	0.4	0.0	0.4	2.9

=== Retirement ===
Lehning announced her retirement in January 2012 after complications from a torn ACL.

== Coaching career ==
Lehning was hired as an assistant coach at her alma mater on January 10, 2010 as a mid-season replacement for Andria Jones, who had left in October. After four and a half seasons as a Kansas State assistant coach, Lehning was hired as an associate head coach for Northern Colorado in May 2014.

== Awards and honors ==
- 2007–08 All-Big 12 First Team
- 2007–08 Kansas City Star Co-Big 12 Player of the Year
- 2007–08 Kansas City Star All-Big 12 First Team
- 2007–08 Waco Tribune All-Big 12 Second Team
- 2007–08 CoSIDA/ESPN the Magazine Academic All-District VII Third Team
- 2007–08 Academic All-Big 12 First Team
- Big 12 Player of the Week (March 7, 2008)
- 2006–07 All-Big 12 honorable mention
- 2005–06 All-Newcomer Team
- 2005 Gatorade Player of the Year – Kansas
- 2005 Miss Kansas Basketball
- 2005 Dodge City Globe Player of the Year
- 4× KBCA All-State First Team Class 2A
- 2× State 2A Basketball Champion
- 2× Wichita Eagle/Topeka Capital Journal All-State Selection
- 4× Wichita Eagle/Topeka Capital Journal All-Class 2A First Team
- 4× Garden City Telegram Southwest Kansas All-Area and First Team
- 4× Dodge City Daily Globe Southwest Kansas All-Area and First Team
- 3× Hutchinson News Player of the Year
- 2× Hutchinson News Athlete of the Year
- 4× Hutchinson News All-Area Top 15 First Team and All-Class 2A First Team
- 4× Hutchinson News 2A Most Valuable Player
- WBCA High School All-American Top 100
- School record holder in career scoring, rebounding, assists and steals at Sublette HS

== See also ==
- List of NCAA Division I basketball career triple-doubles leaders
