= Nicky Anosike =

American basketball player (born 1986)

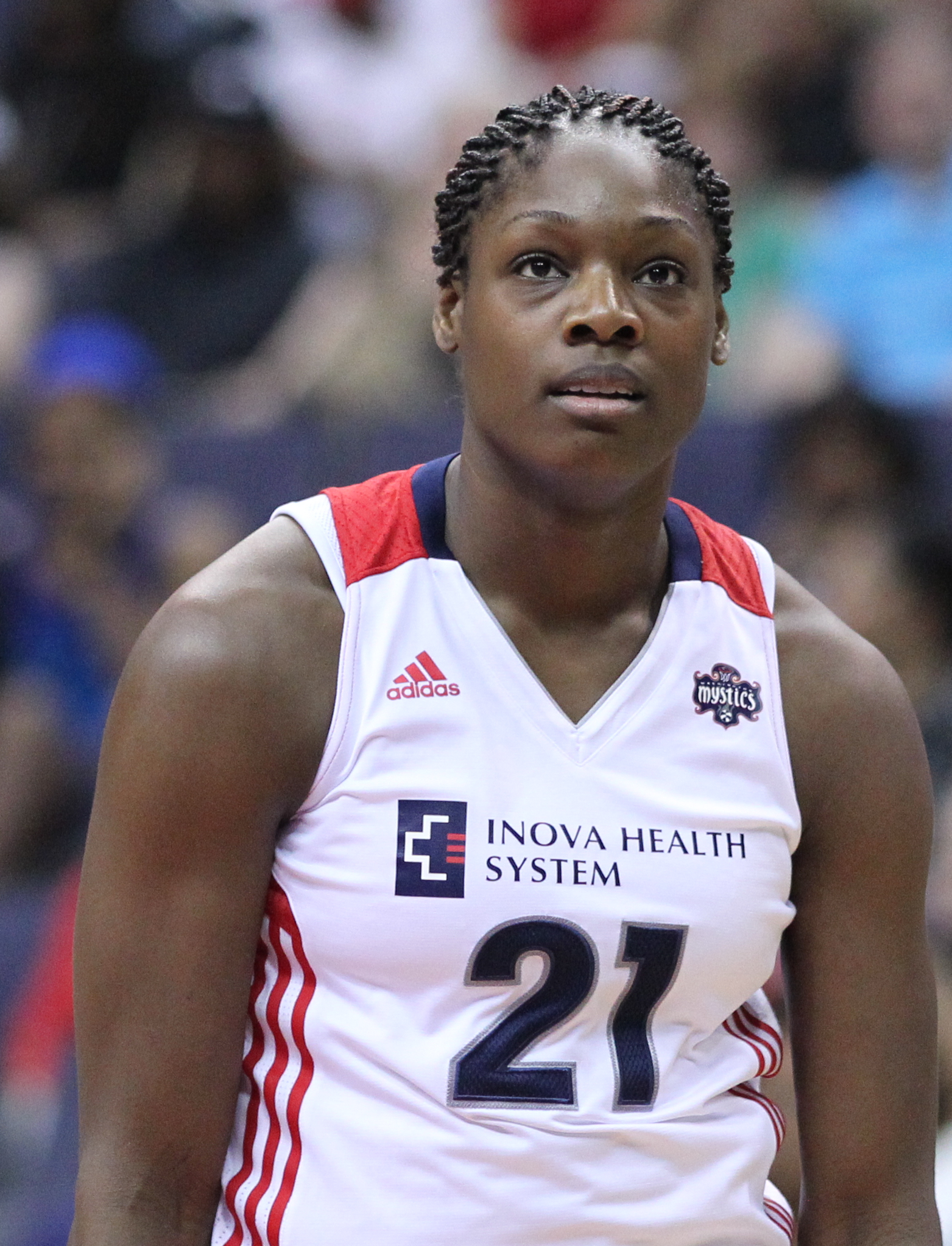

Personal information
- Born: February 27, 1986 (age 40) Brooklyn, New York, U.S.
- Listed height: 6 ft 3 in (1.91 m)
- Listed weight: 210 lb (95 kg)

Career information
- High school: St. Peter's (Staten Island, New York)
- College: Tennessee (2004–2008)
- WNBA draft: 2008: 2nd round, 16th overall pick
- Drafted by: Minnesota Lynx
- Playing career: 2008–present
- Position: Forward / center

Career history
- 2008–2010: Minnesota Lynx
- 2011: Washington Mystics
- 2012: Los Angeles Sparks

Career highlights
- WNBA All-Star (2009); WNBA All-Rookie Team (2008); WNBA All-Defensive First Team (2009); 2× NCAA champion (2007, 2008); NCAA Woman of the Year Award (2008); SEC All-Freshman Team (2005); McDonald's All-American (2004); Miss New York Basketball (2004)
- Stats at WNBA.com
- Stats at Basketball Reference
Medals
Women's basketball
Representing the United States
Pan American Games
Gold medal – first place	2007 Brazil	Team
FIBA Under-19 World Cup
Gold medal – first place	2005 Tunisia	Team

Nkolika "Nicky" Nonyelum Anosike (born February 27, 1986) is an American former professional basketball player in the Women's National Basketball Association (WNBA).

== Personal ==
Anosike was born in Brooklyn, New York and grew up in West New Brighton, Staten Island where she attended St. Peter's High School for Girls. Anosike was named a WBCA All-American. She participated in the 2004 WBCA High School All-America Game, where she scored one point. Her younger brother, O. D. Anosike, plays pro basketball for Scavolini Pesaro in Italy.

== College ==
Anosike attended college at Tennessee and graduated in 2008. She had a cumulative GPA of 3.78 in her triple major studies in sociology/criminal justice, political science and legal studies. She began playing during the 2008 season and last took the court during the 2012 campaign. While at Tennessee, Anosike won back to back National Champions in 2007 and 2008. Anosike earned academic All-Southeastern Conference honors in 2005, 2006 and 2007. She was also on the Lady Vol honor roll and Tennessee Dean's List every semester of her collegiate career. She was named to the ESPN The Magazine Academic All-District IV third team in 2006 and to the first team in 2007 after a perfect 4.0 GPA in the fall semester of 2006. She was teammates with Candace Parker, Shannon Bobbitt, and Alexis Hornbuckle.

=== Tennessee statistics ===
Legend
GP	Games played	GS	Games started	MPG	Minutes per game
FG%	Field goal percentage	3P%	3-point field goal percentage	FT%	Free throw percentage
RPG	Rebounds per game	APG	Assists per game	SPG	Steals per game
BPG	Blocks per game	PPG	Points per game	**Bold**	Career high

Year	Team	GP	Points	FG%	3P%	FT%	RPG	APG	SPG	BPG	PPG
2004–05	Tennessee	35	233	36.8%	0.0%	65.7%	6.1	1.4	1.4	0.9	6.7
2005–06	Tennessee	36	255	**51.0%**	0.0%	**71.2%**	5.4	1.5	1.4	1.3	7.1
2006–07	Tennessee	37	278	42.7%	0.0%	60.0%	6.2	1.6	1.3	1.1	7.5
2007–08	Tennessee	**38**	**333**	45.6%	0.0%	62.5%	**7.3**	**2.1**	**1.7**	1.1	**8.8**
Career		146	1099	44.1%	0.0%	65.0%	6.3	1.7	1.5	1.1	7.5

== USA Basketball ==
Anosike was named to the USA Women's U19 team which represented the US in the 2005 U19 World's Championship, held in Tunis, Tunisia, in July and August 2007. Anosike averaged 11.4 points per game helping her team to a 7–0 record and a gold medal.

Anosike played for the USA team in the 2007 Pan American Games in Rio de Janeiro, Brazil. The team won all five games, earning the gold medal for the event.

== WNBA career ==
Following her collegiate career she declared for the WNBA draft. Anosike was selected in the 2nd round with the 16th overall pick of the 2008 WNBA draft by the Minnesota Lynx. She was selected right after her college teammate Shannon Bobbitt who was selected by the Los Angeles Sparks where her other teammate Candace Parker will play. In Minnesota she started all the games for the Lynx while the first round pick, Candice Wiggins, came off the bench also winning the 6th Woman of the Year Award. Anosike was selected to the 2009 West All Star Team as a reserve, along with former teammate Charde Houston. Anosike was traded to the Washington Mystics on April 9, 2011.On February 23, 2012, Anosike was traded to the Los Angeles Sparks.

== WNBA career statistics ==
Legend
GP	Games played	GS	Games started	MPG	Minutes per game	RPG	Rebounds per game
APG	Assists per game	SPG	Steals per game	BPG	Blocks per game	PPG	Points per game
TO	Turnovers per game	FG%	Field-goal percentage	3P%	3-point field-goal percentage	FT%	Free-throw percentage
**Bold**	Career best	°	League leader

=== Regular season ===
Year	Team	GP	GS	MPG	FG%	3P%	FT%	RPG	APG	SPG	BPG	TO	PPG
2008	Minnesota	**34**	**34**	27.1	.438	.000	.699	6.8	1.3	2.2	**1.3**	1.2	9.2
2009	Minnesota	30	29	29.9	**.491**	**.250**	.696	**7.4**	**2.7**	**2.7**	0.9	2.0	**13.2**
2010	Minnesota	31	30	**29.9**	.372	.000	.773	6.8	1.9	2.0	1.0	2.1	9.2
2011	Washington	**34**	29	27.2	.347	.000	.736	7.2	1.4	1.4	0.8	1.7	7.0
2012	Los Angeles	10	0	5.7	.250	.000	**1.000**	1.2	0.5	0.3	0.2	0.6	1.0
Career	5 years, 3 teams	139	122	26.8	.415	.167	.725	6.6	1.7	1.9	1.0	1.7	8.9

=== Playoffs ===
Year	Team	GP	GS	MPG	FG%	3P%	FT%	RPG	APG	SPG	BPG	TO	PPG
2012	Los Angeles	3	0	6.3	.375	.000	.500	1.7	0.7	0.3	0.0	1.0	2.3
Career	1 year, 1 team	3	0	6.3	.375	.000	.500	1.7	0.7	0.3	0.0	1.0	2.3

== Overseas ==
- 2009–2010: (Romania) Municipal MCM Târgovişte.
- 2010–2011: (Spain) Ros Casares Valencia.
