= 2010 Minnesota Lynx season =

- Head coach: Cheryl Reeve
- Arena: Target Center

Results
- Record: 13–21 (.382)
- Place: 5th (Western)
- Playoff finish: Did not qualify

Media
- Television: FS-N; NBATV, ESPN2
- Radio: KLCI

The 2010 Minnesota Lynx season was the 12th season for the Minnesota Lynx of the Women's National Basketball Association, and the 1st season under head coach Cheryl Reeve.

The season tipped-off on Saturday, May 15, 2010, in Tulsa against the Tulsa Shock. The Lynx failed to improve their 14–20 record from 2009 and finished the season with a 13–21 record, Thus missing the postseason for the 6th straight season.

== Transactions ==
=== Dispersal draft ===
Based on the Lynx's 2009 record, they would pick 2nd in the Sacramento Monarchs dispersal draft. The Lynx picked Rebekkah Brunson.

=== WNBA draft ===
The following are the Lynx's selections in the 2010 WNBA draft.

Round	Pick	Player	Nationality	School/team/country
1	2 (from Conn.)	Monica Wright	United States	Virginia
1	3	Kelsey Griffin	United States	Nebraska
3	26	Gabriela Marginean	United States	Drexel

=== Transaction log ===
- January 30, 2009: The Lynx traded their second round pick in the 2010 Draft to the Washington Mystics as part of the Lindsey Harding transaction.
- January 12: The Lynx traded Renee Montgomery and the first overall pick in the 2010 Draft to the Connecticut Sun in exchange for Lindsay Whalen and the second overall pick in the 2010 Draft.
- February 8: The Lynx re-signed free agent Seimone Augustus.
- February 16: The Lynx withdrew its qualifying offer to Tasha Humphrey, making her an unrestricted free agent.
- February 17: The Lynx signed free agent Hamchetou Maiga-Ba.
- February 19: The Lynx signed and traded Roneeka Hodges to the San Antonio Silver Stars in exchange for the right to swap second round picks with San Antonio in the 2011 WNBA Draft.
- April 8: The Lynx traded the draft rights to Kelsey Griffin to the Connecticut Sun in exchange for their first- and second-round draft picks in the 2011 Draft.
- April 20: The Lynx signed Nuria Martinez.
- April 22: The Lynx signed Ashley Ellis-Milan, Brittany McCoy, Vanessa Gidden and Jessica Adair to training camp contracts.
- May 12: The Lynx waived Jessica Adair, Ashley Ellis-Milan, Vanessa Gidden and Brittany McCoy.
- May 24: The Lynx activated Rebekkah Brunson and waived Gabriela Marginean.
- July 26: The Lynx traded Rashanda McCants to the Tulsa Shock in exchange for Alexis Hornbuckle.
- August 3: The Lynx waived Nuria Martinez and signed Kristen Mann.
- August 18: The Lynx signed Jessica Adair and suspended Nicky Anosike.

=== Trades ===
Date	Trade	
January 12, 2010	To Minnesota Lynx	To Connecticut Sun
January 12, 2010	Lindsay Whalen and second overall pick in 2010 Draft	Renee Montgomery and first overall pick in 2010 Draft
February 19, 2010	To Minnesota Lynx	To San Antonio Silver Stars
February 19, 2010	the right to swap second round picks in the 2011 Draft	Roneeka Hodges and right to swap second round picks in the 2011 Draft
April 8, 2010	To Minnesota Lynx	To Connecticut Sun
April 8, 2010	first- and second-round draft picks in the 2011 Draft	draft rights to Kelsey Griffin
July 26, 2010	To Minnesota Lynx	To Tulsa Shock
July 26, 2010	Alexis Hornbuckle	Rashanda McCants

=== Free agents ===
==== Additions ====
Player	Signed	Former team
Rebekkah Brunson	December 14, 2009	Sacramento Monarchs
Lindsay Whalen	January 12, 2010	Connecticut Sun
Seimone Augustus	February 8, 2010	re-signed
Hamchetou Maiga-Ba	February 17, 2010	Sacramento Monarchs
Nuria Martinez	April 20, 2010	free agent
Alexis Hornbuckle	July 26, 2010	Tulsa Shock
Kristen Mann	August 3, 2010	free agent

==== Subtractions ====
Player	Left	New team
Renee Montgomery	January 12, 2010	Connecticut Sun
Tasha Humphrey	February 16, 2010	free agent
Roneeka Hodges	February 19, 2010	San Antonio Silver Stars
Kelly Miller	March 17, 2010	Atlanta Dream
Rashanda McCants	July 26, 2010	Tulsa Shock
Nuria Martinez	August 3, 2010	free agent

== Roster ==
2010 Minnesota Lynx roster
Players
Coaches

Pos.	No.	Nat.	Name	Height	Weight	From
F/C	21	(United States)	Anosike, Nicky	6' 4" (1.93m)	211 lb (96kg)	Tennessee
G	33	(United States)	Augustus, Seimone	6' 0" (1.83m)	179 lb (81kg)	LSU
F	32	(United States)	Brunson, Rebekkah	6' 3" (1.91m)	175 lb (79kg)	Georgetown
C	9	(United States)	Hollingsworth, Quanitra	6' 5" (1.96m)	201 lb (91kg)	VCU
SG	14	(United States)	Hornbuckle, Alexis	5' 11" (1.8m)	155 lb (70kg)	Tennessee
F	24	(United States)	Houston, Charde	6' 1" (1.85m)	189 lb (86kg)	Connecticut
F	99	(Mali)	Maiga-Ba, Hamchetou	6' 2" (1.88m)	162 lb (73kg)	Old Dominion
F	44	(United States)	Mann, Kristen	6' 1" (1.85m)	185 lb (84kg)	UC Santa Barbara
PG	13	(United States)	Whalen, Lindsay	5' 9" (1.75m)	150 lb (68kg)	Minnesota
G	11	(United States)	Wiggins, Candice (injured)	5' 11" (1.8m)	154 lb (70kg)	Stanford
G	22	(United States)	Wright, Monica	5' 11" (1.8m)	178 lb (81kg)	Virginia

Head coach
(United States) Cheryl Reeve (La Salle)
Assistant coaches
(United States) Jim Petersen (Minnesota)
Athletic trainer
(United States) Chuck Barta (UW–La Crosse)
(United States) Keith Uzpen

Legend

- (C) Team captain
- (DP) Unsigned draft pick
- (FA) Free agent
- (S) Suspended
- Injured

WNBA roster page

=== Depth ===
Pos.	Starter	Bench
C	Rebekkah Brunson	Quanitra Hollingsworth
PF	Nicky Anosike	Charde Houston
SF	Seimone Augustus	Hamchetou Maiga-Ba / Kristen Mann
SG	Monica Wright	Candice Wiggins
PG	Lindsay Whalen	Alexis Hornbuckle

== Season standings ==
Western Conference	W	L	PCT	GB	Home	Road	Conf.
Seattle Storm ^{x}	28	6	.824	–	17–0	11–6	20–2
Phoenix Mercury ^{x}	15	19	.441	13.0	9–8	6–11	13–9
San Antonio Silver Stars ^{x}	14	20	.412	14.0	8–9	6–11	11–11
Los Angeles Sparks ^{x}	13	21	.382	15.0	8–9	5–12	10–12
Minnesota Lynx ^{o}	13	21	.382	15.0	7–10	6–11	8–14
Tulsa Shock ^{o}	6	28	.176	22.0	4–13	2–15	4–18

== Schedule ==
=== Preseason ===
2010 Game Log: Preseason

Game	Date	Time (ET)	Opponent	Score	High points	High rebounds	High assists	Location/Attendance	Record
1	April 30	1:00pm	Chicago	78-87	Wright (18)	Marginean (9)	Wright (4)	Concordia University; 633	0-1
2	May 6	12:30pm	@ Chicago	65-74	Wright (18)	Wright (6)	Whalen (10)	Allstate Arena; N/A	0-2

=== Regular season ===
2010 Game Log: Regular Season
May

Game	Date	Time (ET)	Opponent	TV	Score	High points	High rebounds	High assists	Location/Attendance	Record
1	May 15	8:00pm	@ Tulsa	NBATV; COX	80-74	Houston (21)	Anosike (9)	Whalen (6)	BOK Center; 7,806	1-0
2	May 16	7:00pm	Washington	FS-N	76-87	Houston (19)	5 players (5)	Whalen (7)	Target Center; 9,985	1-1
3	May 19	10:00pm	@ Seattle	KING	76-79	Wright (19)	Anosike (10)	Maiga-Ba (4)	KeyArena; 6,687	1-2
4	May 23	7:00pm	Tulsa		82-94	Houston (23)	Anosike, Houston (9)	Maiga-Ba, Whalen (4)	Target Center; 6,822	1-3
5	May 27	7:30pm	@ Connecticut		79-105	Houston, McCants (16)	Anosike, McCants (7)	Anosike (5)	Mohegan Sun Arena; 6,401	1-4
6	May 29	8:00pm	Chicago	CN100	58-73	Houston, McCants (12)	Brunson (9)	Houston (3)	Target Center; 6,129	1-5

June

Game	Date	Time (ET)	Opponent	TV	Score	High points	High rebounds	High assists	Location/Attendance	Record
7	June 1	7:30pm	Phoenix	ESPN2	92-82	Wright (32)	Brunson (15)	Anosike, Whalen (5)	Target Center; 6,854	2-5
8	June 4	8:00pm	@ Tulsa	FS-OK	79-92	Brunson (23)	Brunson (11)	Anosike, Whalen (5)	BOK Center; 4,521	2-6
9	June 6	7:00pm	Indiana	FS-N	51-89	Wiggins (11)	Brunson (12)	Anosike, Wiggins (3)	Target Center; 6,444	2-7
10	June 10	10:00pm	@ Phoenix	FS-A	88-99	Wright (21)	Brunson (12)	Whalen (6)	US Airways Center; 5,506	2-8
11	June 13	3:00pm	@ Los Angeles		84-88	Houston (21)	Brunson (15)	Whalen (7)	STAPLES Center; 7,005	2-9
12	June 18	8:00pm	Tulsa		78-67	Augustus (27)	Anosike (9)	Whalen (12)	Target Center; 6,953	3-9
13	June 19	8:00pm	@ Tulsa	COX	92-78	Wiggins (19)	Brunson (11)	Whalen (6)	BOK Center; 5,013	4-9
14	June 22	7:30pm	@ New York		75-68	Brunson (21)	Brunson (13)	Maiga-Ba, Whalen (4)	Madison Square Garden; 7,537	5-9
15	June 26	8:00pm	@ San Antonio	NBATV; FS-SW	66-80	Augustus (14)	Brunson (9)	Whalen (4)	AT&T Center; 10,184	5-10

July

Game	Date	Time (ET)	Opponent	TV	Score	High points	High rebounds	High assists	Location/Attendance	Record
16	July 1	7:00pm	@ Atlanta	SSO	58-76	Augustus (17)	Anosike (7)	Maiga-Ba, Whalen (2)	Philips Arena; 4,020	5-11
17	July 8	8:00pm	San Antonio		89-66	Brunson (24)	Brunson (10)	Whalen (5)	Target Center; 7,182	6-11
18	July 14	1:00pm	Atlanta		83-81	Augustus (22)	Brunson (9)	Whalen (7)	Target Center; 12,311	7-11
19	July 17	3:30pm	Seattle		71-73	Brunson (19)	Brunson (9)	Whalen (6)	Target Center; 7,216	7-12
20	July 22	8:00pm	San Antonio		72-74	Augustus (22)	Brunson (14)	Whalen (8)	Target Center; 6,126	7-13
21	July 24	8:00pm	Phoenix	NBATV; FS-N	124-127 (2OT)	Augustus (36)	Brunson (17)	Whalen (10)	Target Center; 8,518	7-14
22	July 27	8:00pm	Los Angeles		58-71	Whalen, Wright (12)	Brunson (11)	Wright (4)	Target Center; 6,215	7-15
23	July 29	10:00pm	@ Phoenix		92-110	Houston (26)	Houston (13)	Whalen (4)	US Airways Center; 7,037	7-16

August

Game	Date	Time (ET)	Opponent	TV	Score	High points	High rebounds	High assists	Location/Attendance	Record
24	August 1	7:00pm	Seattle	NBATV; FS-N	72-71	Augustus (24)	Brunson (8)	Whalen (7)	Target Center; 7,312	8-16
25	August 3	8:00pm	Connecticut	CSN-NE	111-103 (OT)	Whalen (27)	Anosike (12)	Whalen (12)	Target Center; 5,954	9-16
26	August 7	3:00pm	@ Chicago	ESPN2	87-82 (OT)	Augustus (27)	Anosike, Whalen (7)	Whalen (7)	Allstate Arena; 4,992	10-16
27	August 8	7:00pm	New York	NBATV; FS-N	72-74	Whalen (18)	Brunson (18)	Whalen, Wright (3)	Target Center; 9,016	10-17
28	August 10	8:00pm	@ San Antonio		73-66	Augustus (20)	Brunson (12)	Hornbuckle, Whalen (4)	AT&T Center; 5,142	11-17
29	August 12	8:00pm	Los Angeles		77-78	Houston (24)	Brunson (14)	Houston, Wright (3)	Target Center; 7,867	11-18
30	August 13	7:00pm	@ Washington		58-61	Whalen, Wright (13)	Brunson (10)	Whalen (5)	Verizon Center; 7,752	11-19
31	August 15	7:00pm	San Antonio	NBATV; FS-N; FS-SW	84-78	Whalen (21)	Brunson, Houston (8)	Whalen (12)	Target Center; 8,678	12-19
32	August 17	10:00pm	@ Seattle		64-68	Whalen (20)	Houston (9)	Whalen (5)	KeyArena; 7,394	12-20
33	August 20	10:30pm	@ Los Angeles		91-98	Houston (21)	Brunson, Houston (7)	Whalen (7)	STAPLES Center; 13,154	12-21
34	August 22	5:00pm	@ Indiana	NBATV; FS-I	83-79 (OT)	Augustus (25)	Wright (7)	Houston (4)	Conseco Fieldhouse; 10,015	13-21

All games are viewable on WNBA LiveAccess

== Statistics ==
Legend
GP	Games played	GS	Games started	MPG	Minutes per game	RPG	Rebounds per game
APG	Assists per game	SPG	Steals per game	BPG	Blocks per game	PPG	Points per game
FG%	Field-goal percentage	3P%	3-point field-goal percentage	FT%	Free-throw percentage	TO	Turnovers per game
PF	Fouls per game		Team leader		League leader

=== Regular season ===
Player	GP	GS	MPG	FG%	3P%	FT%	RPG	APG	SPG	BPG	PPG
Jessica Adair	1	0	14.0	1.000	.000	.750	8.0	0.0	0.00	0.00	5.0
Nicky Anosike	31	30	29.9	.372	.000	.773	6.8	1.9	2.00	1.03	9.2
Seimone Augustus	25	25	33.3	.429	.336	.667	3.2	1.9	0.68	0.28	16.9
Rebekkah Brunson	30	30	30.5	.429	.000	.663	10.3	0.8	1.20	0.97	11.3
Quanitra Hollingsworth	25	0	7.3	.378	.000	.600	1.8	0.2	0.20	0.04	1.7
Alexis Hornbuckle	13	0	14.9	.283	.167	.750	1.5	1.3	1.38	0.23	3.0
Charde Houston	34	8	22.3	.416	.365	.704	4.1	1.4	1.26	0.59	11.8
Hamchetou Maiga-Ba	34	9	13.7	.384	.000	.667	2.3	0.9	0.38	0.15	3.2
Kristen Mann	5	0	3.0	.167	.250	.000	0.0	0.0	0.00	0.00	0.6
Gabriela Marginean	4	0	3.0	.200	.000	.000	1.0	0.3	0.25	0.25	0.5
Nuria Martinez	15	0	8.5	.182	.150	.667	0.7	0.7	0.33	0.00	1.8
Lindsay Whalen	33	33	33.6	.410	.231	.899	4.0	5.6	1.39	0.15	12.6
Candice Wiggins	8	7	29.8	.405	.457	.967	2.8	2.1	1.75	0.00	13.8
Monica Wright	34	24	25.5	.370	.340	.819	2.9	1.5	1.00	0.21	11.1

== Awards and honors ==
- Seimone Augustus was named WNBA Western Conference Player of the Week for the week of June 12, 2010.
- Lindsay Whalen was named WNBA Western Conference Player of the Week for the week of July 31, 2010.
- Rebekkah Brunson was named to the 2010 WNBA All-Star Team as a WNBA reserve.
- Lindsay Whalen was named to the 2010 WNBA All-Star Team as a WNBA reserve.
- Monica Wright was named to the All-Rookie Team.
- Rebekkah Brunson was named to the All-Defensive Second Team.
