= Wanisha Smith =

American basketball player (born 1985)

Temple Owls
- Title: Assistant coach
- League: American Athletic Conference

Personal information
- Born: July 9, 1985 (age 41) Cincinnati, Ohio, U.S.
- Listed height: 5 ft 11 in (1.80 m)

Career information
- High school: Riverdale Baptist (Upper Marlboro, Maryland)
- College: Duke (2004–2008)
- WNBA draft: 2008: 2nd round, 27th overall pick
- Drafted by: New York Liberty
- Playing career: 2008–2009
- Position: Guard
- Coaching career: 2009–present

Career history

Playing
- 2008: Detroit Shock

Coaching
- 2009–2017: Longwood (assistant)
- 2017–2019: Towson (assistant)
- 2019–2020: Duke (assistant)
- 2022–present: Temple (assistant)

Career highlights
- ACC All-Freshman Team (2005); McDonald's All-American (2004)
- Stats at Basketball Reference

Wanisha Marie Smith (born July 9, 1985) is an American basketball coach and former player. Smith attended Fairfield High School in Fairfield, Ohio before moving to Riverdale Baptist School in Upper Marlboro, Maryland. Following her high school career, she played college basketball at Duke University and played briefly in the Women's National Basketball Association (WNBA) for the Detroit Shock.

== Coaching career ==
Smith was an assistant coach for Longwood University women's team for eight years, from 2009 to 2017. She then spent two years as an assistant for Towson University women's team before being hired as an assistant at Duke in 2019.

== Career statistics ==
=== WNBA career statistics ===
Legend
GP	Games played	GS	Games started	MPG	Minutes per game	RPG	Rebounds per game
APG	Assists per game	SPG	Steals per game	BPG	Blocks per game	PPG	Points per game
TO	Turnovers per game	FG%	Field-goal percentage	3P%	3-point field-goal percentage	FT%	Free-throw percentage
**Bold**	Career best	°	League leader

==== Regular season ====
Year	Team	GP	GS	MPG	FG%	3P%	FT%	RPG	APG	SPG	BPG	TO	PPG
2008	Detroit	1	0	0.0	0.0	0.0	0.0	0.0	0.0	0.0	0.0	0.0	0.0
Career	1 year, 1 team	1	0	0.0	0.0	0.0	0.0	0.0	0.0	0.0	0.0	0.0	0.0

=== College career statistics ===
Legend
GP	Games played	GS	Games started	MPG	Minutes per game
FG%	Field goal percentage	3P%	3-point field goal percentage	FT%	Free throw percentage
RPG	Rebounds per game	APG	Assists per game	SPG	Steals per game
BPG	Blocks per game	PPG	Points per game	**Bold**	Career high

Year	Team	GP	Points	FG%	3P%	FT%	RPG	APG	SPG	BPG	PPG
2004–05	Duke	**36**	394	42.9	**41.0**	72.0	2.8	**4.3**	**1.7**	0.1	**10.9**
2005–06	Duke	35	259	**43.8**	31.7	70.5	2.7	3.5	1.2	0.1	7.4
2006–07	Duke	34	320	41.8	36.0	75.5	**4.3**	4.0	1.1	0.1	9.4
2007–08	Duke	30	283	34.7	30.6	**76.0**	3.1	2.9	0.9	0.0	9.4
Career	Duke	135	1256	40.8	35.1	73.8	3.2	3.7	1.2	0.1	9.3
