= 2004 McDonald's All-American Girls Game =

Basketball game

West	East
66	91
- Date: March 31, 2004
- Venue: Ford Center, Oklahoma City, Oklahoma
- MVP: Alexis Hornbuckle
- Network: ESPN2

McDonald's All-American

The 2004 McDonald's All-American Girls Game was an all-star basketball game that was played at Ford Center in Oklahoma City, Oklahoma. The game's rosters featured the best and most highly recruited high school girls graduating in the class of 2004. The game was the 3rd annual version of the McDonald's All-American Game first played in 2002. The 24 players were selected from over 700 nominees by a committee of basketball experts. They were chosen not only for their on-court skills, but for their performances off the court as well.

== Rosters ==
Tennessee had the most selections with five.

=== Team East ===
Name	Height	Position	Hometown	High school	College choice
Matee Ajavon	5–8	PG	Newark, New Jersey	Malcolm X Shabazz	Rutgers
Nicky Anosike	6–3	C	Staten Island, New York	St. Peter's Girls	Tennessee
Chante Black	6–5	C	Winston-Salem, North Carolina	East Forysth (NC)	Duke
Essence Carson	6–0	SG	Paterson, New Jersey	Eastside (Paterson, NJ)	Rutgers
Sylvia Fowles	6–5	C	Miami, Florida	Gulliver Prep	LSU
Laura Harper	6–4	PF	Elkins Park, Pennsylvania	Cheltenham	Maryland
Alexis Hornbuckle	5–11	SG	Charleston, West Virginia	South Charleston	Tennessee
Tasha Humphrey	6–4	PF	Gainesville, Georgia	Gainsville (GA)	Georgia
Crystal Langhorne	6–2	PF	Willingboro, New Jersey	Willingboro	Maryland
Erlana Larkins	6–3	PF	Riviera Beach, Florida	The Benjamin School	North Carolina
Wanisha Smith	5–11	SG	Upper Malboro, Maryland	Riverdale Baptist School	Duke
Erica White	5–4	PG	Jacksonville, Florida	Jean Ribault	LSU

=== Team West ===
Name	Height	Position	Hometown	High school	College choice
Quianna Chaney	5–11	SG	Baton Rouge, Louisiana	Southern U. Lab School	LSU
Kristen Forristall	6–1	PF	Oregon City, Oregon	Oregon City	Oregon
Alex Fuller	6–2	C	Shelbyville, Tennessee	Shelbyville (TN)	Tennessee
Darrice Griffin	6–6	PF	Seagraves, Texas	Seagraves	Texas Tech
Charde Houston	6–0	SF	San Diego, California	San Diego	Connecticut
Marscilla Packer	5–10	SG	Pickerington, Ohio	Pickerington North	Ohio State
Candace Parker	6–3	SG	Naperville, Illinois	Naperville Central	Tennessee
Cissy Pierce	5–10	SF	Littleton, Colorado	Heritage (CO)	Stanford
Lindsey Pluimer	6–3	C	San Clemente, California	San Clemente (CA)	UCLA
Mel Thomas	5–9	PG	Cincinnati, Ohio	Mount Notre Dame	Connecticut
Candice Wiggins	5–11	SG	San Diego, California	La Jolla Country Day School	Stanford
Sa'de Wiley Gatewood	5–9	PG	Pomona, California	Lynwood (CA)	Tennessee
