= Rashanda McCants =

American basketball player (born 1986)

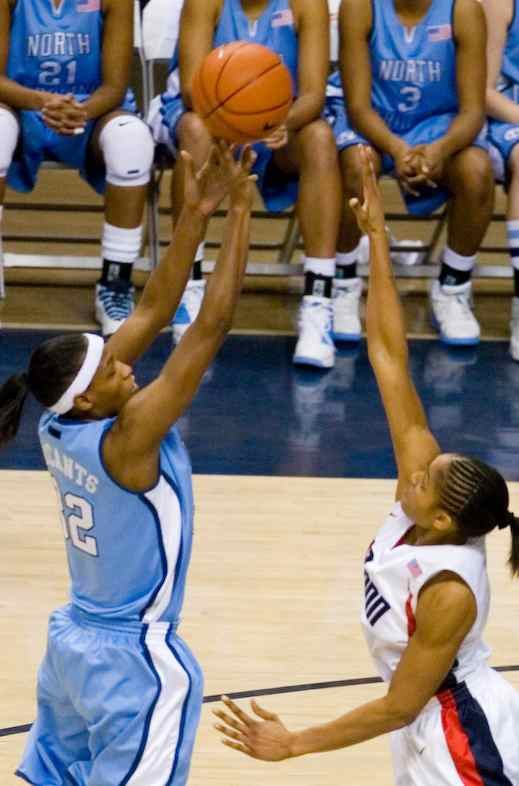

Personal information
- Born: November 17, 1986 (age 39) Asheville, North Carolina, U.S.
- Listed height: 6 ft 1 in (1.85 m)
- Listed weight: 163 lb (74 kg)

Career information
- High school: Asheville (Asheville, North Carolina)
- College: North Carolina (2005–2009)
- WNBA draft: 2009: 2nd round, 15th overall pick
- Drafted by: Minnesota Lynx
- Playing career: 2009–2011
- Position: Forward

Career history
- 2009–2010: Minnesota Lynx
- 2010–2011: Tulsa Shock

Career highlights
- McDonald's All-American (2005); North Carolina Miss Basketball (2005)
- Stats at WNBA.com
- Stats at Basketball Reference

Rashanda McCants (born November 17, 1986) is an American former professional women's basketball player in the Women's National Basketball Association. Her brother is Rashad McCants, who also played professional basketball.

== Personal life ==
Rashanda Chanee’ McCants is the daughter of James and Brenda McCants. Her older brother, Rashad McCants, played in the National Basketball Association.

== High school ==
McCants played for Asheville High School in Asheville, North Carolina. McCants was an All-America selection by McDonald's. She and her older brother, Rashad, are the first brother-sister duo to play in the McDonald's All-American Game.

== College ==
As a freshman, McCants was an honorable mention selection for the ACC All-Freshman team. She appeared in 34 games, ranking fifth on the team in scoring.

In her sophomore campaign, McCants started all 38 games for the Tar Heels, establishing a new school record for games played and games started in a season. In her junior year, McCants averaged 15.8 points, 3.3 assists, and 6.6 rebounds per game. She was named to the All ACC second team.

In her senior season, McCants was named to the All-American, ACC Player of the Year, Naismith Watch List, Preseason Wooden List and Lowe's Senior CLASS Award Candidate. She was also a preseason Wade Watch List selection. She averaged 15 points and 6.5 rebounds per game.

== WNBA career ==
McCants was drafted 15th (second round) overall in the WNBA draft to the Minnesota Lynx in 2009. She was later traded to the Tulsa Shock for Alexis Hornbuckle. McCants was waived by the Shock in June 2011.

== WNBA career statistics ==
Legend
GP	Games played	GS	Games started	MPG	Minutes per game	RPG	Rebounds per game
APG	Assists per game	SPG	Steals per game	BPG	Blocks per game	PPG	Points per game
TO	Turnovers per game	FG%	Field-goal percentage	3P%	3-point field-goal percentage	FT%	Free-throw percentage
**Bold**	Career best	°	League leader

=== Regular season ===
Year	Team	GP	GS	MPG	FG%	3P%	FT%	RPG	APG	SPG	BPG	TO	PPG
2009	Minnesota	**34**	1	14.2	.373	.289	.564	2.0	0.8	0.4	0.3	1.1	4.3
2010	Minnesota	17	**4**	15.8	**.393**	**.297**	**.621**	**2.4**	0.9	0.6	0.1	0.8	5.6
2010	Tulsa	6	**4**	**17.7**	.350	.278	.400	2.0	**1.5**	**0.8**	**0.5**	1.0	**5.8**
Career	3 years, 2 teams	57	9	15.0	.376	.290	.575	2.1	0.9	0.5	0.3	1.0	4.8

== College statistics ==
Legend
GP	Games played	GS	Games started	MPG	Minutes per game
FG%	Field goal percentage	3P%	3-point field goal percentage	FT%	Free throw percentage
RPG	Rebounds per game	APG	Assists per game	SPG	Steals per game
BPG	Blocks per game	PPG	Points per game	**Bold**	Career high

Year	Team	GP	Points	FG%	3P%	FT%	RPG	APG	SPG	BPG	PPG
2005–06	North Carolina	34	196	37.8	**29.9**	56.8	3.0	1.5	1.2	0.4	5.8
2006–07	North Carolina	**38**	356	44.5	26.7	**72.7**	4.3	2.2	**2.2**	0.6	9.4
2007–08	North Carolina	36	**569**	**44.7**	28.2	62.9	**6.6**	**3.3**	**2.2**	0.6	**15.8**
2008–09	North Carolina	34	488	45.5	28.6	62.7	6.4	2.1	1.3	0.6	14.4
Career	North Carolina	142	1609	43.9	28.1	64.2	5.1	2.3	1.7	0.5	11.3
