= Charde Houston =

American basketball player (born 1986)

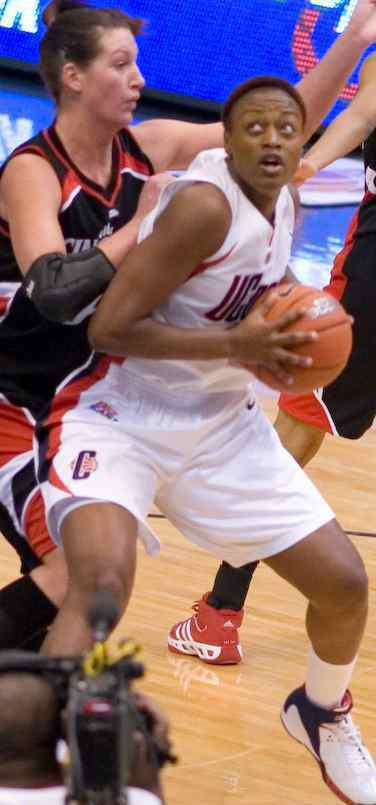

Personal information
- Born: April 10, 1986 (age 40) Oceanside, California, U.S.
- Listed height: 6 ft 0 in (1.83 m)
- Listed weight: 180 lb (82 kg)

Career information
- High school: San Diego (San Diego, California)
- College: UConn (2004–2008)
- WNBA draft: 2008: 3rd round, 30th overall pick
- Drafted by: Minnesota Lynx
- Playing career: 2008–present
- Position: Forward

Career history
- 2008–2011: Minnesota Lynx
- 2012–2013: Phoenix Mercury
- 2013-2015: Bucheon KEB Hana Bank
- 2014: New York Liberty

Career highlights
- WNBA champion (2011); EuroCup Women (2011); Israeli championship (2011); Israeli State Cup (2011); Dawn Staley Community Leadership Award (2011); WNBA Skills Challenge Champion (2009); WNBA All-Star (2009); Big East Tournament MOP (2008); Big East All-Freshman Team (2005); McDonald's All-American (2004)
- Stats at WNBA.com
- Stats at Basketball Reference
Medals
Women's basketball
Representing USA
Pan American Games
Gold medal – first place	2007 Brazil	Team
FIBA Under-18 Americas Championship
Gold medal – first place	2004 Puerto Rico	Team

Charde Lakishia Houston (born April 10, 1986) is an American former professional basketball player in the Women's National Basketball Association (WNBA). She last played for the New York Liberty.

Born in Oceanside, California, Houston played high school basketball at San Diego High from 2000 to 2004, where she set the California state scoring record of 3,837 points. After becoming the first in her family to graduate high school in 2004, Houston signed a letter of intent to play college basketball at UConn. Houston graduated in 2008 with a degree in sociology.

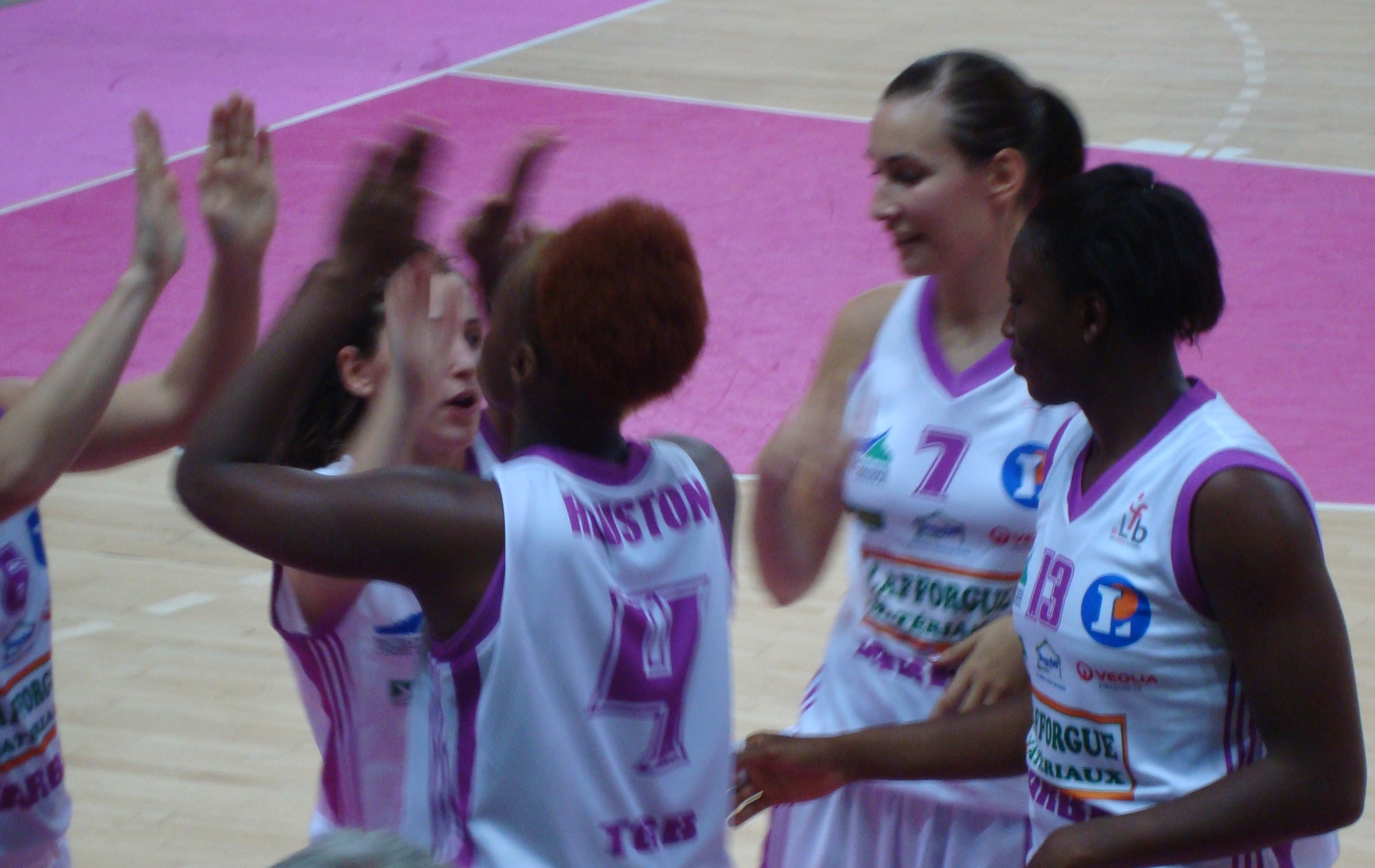
Charde Houston in Tarbes (2009).

Following her collegiate career, she was selected in the 3rd round (30th overall) of the 2008 WNBA draft by the Minnesota Lynx.

Houston was signed by the WNBA's New York Liberty in June 2014 after spending the previous season with the Phoenix Mercury.

== USA Basketball ==
Houston was a member of the USA Women's U18 team which won the gold medal at the FIBA Americas Championship in Mayaguez, Puerto Rico. The event was held in August 2004, when the USA team defeated Puerto Rico to win the championship. Houston helped the team win the gold medal, scoring 10.4 points per game.

Houston played for the USA team in the 2007 Pan American Games in Rio de Janeiro, Brazil. The team won all five games, earning the gold medal for the event.

== International career ==
Houston played during the 2010–2011 off-season for Elitzur Ramla in Israel; she won EuroCup Women, Israeli championship and Israeli State Cup.

== WNBA career statistics ==
Legend
GP	Games played	GS	Games started	MPG	Minutes per game	RPG	Rebounds per game
APG	Assists per game	SPG	Steals per game	BPG	Blocks per game	PPG	Points per game
TO	Turnovers per game	FG%	Field-goal percentage	3P%	3-point field-goal percentage	FT%	Free-throw percentage
**Bold**	Career best	°	League leader

†	Denotes seasons in which Houston won a WNBA championship

=== Regular season ===
Year	Team	GP	GS	MPG	FG%	3P%	FT%	RPG	APG	SPG	BPG	TO	PPG
2008	Minnesota	33	0	17.6	**.492**	.000	.741	3.7	0.8	0.9	0.4	1.7	8.8
2009	Minnesota	**34**	**33**	23.3	.465	.333	.727	**5.5**	**1.7**	**1.3**	**0.6**	1.9	**13.1**
2010	Minnesota	**34**	8	22.3	.416	**.365**	.704	4.1	1.4	**1.3**	**0.6**	2.0	11.8
2011^{†}	Minnesota	27	0	7.8	.365	.261	.750	1.7	0.5	0.3	0.1	0.8	2.9
2012	Phoenix	27	20	**25.7**	.408	.348	.723	3.4	1.6	**1.3**	0.4	1.9	12.0
2013	Phoenix	**34**	6	17.2	.400	.180	**.778**	2.3	1.3	0.5	0.4	1.6	5.9
2014	New York	17	0	8.4	.451	.125	.692	1.0	0.6	0.5	0.4	0.9	3.3
Career	7 years, 3 teams	206	67	18.3	.433	.320	.731	3.3	1.2	0.9	0.4	1.6	8.7

=== Playoffs ===
Year	Team	GP	GS	MPG	FG%	3P%	FT%	RPG	APG	SPG	BPG	TO	PPG
2011^{†}	Minnesota	2	0	**6.0**	**.375**	.000	.000	**2.0**	**0.5**	**0.5**	**0.5**	0.0	**3.0**
2013	Phoenix	**5**	0	4.4	.357	**.200**	.000	1.0	0.0	0.2	0.2	0.2	2.2
Career	2 years, 2 teams	7	0	4.9	.364	.167	.000	1.3	0.1	0.3	0.3	0.1	2.4

== University of Connecticut statistics ==
Charde Houston Statistics at University of Connecticut
Year	G	FG	FGA	PCT	3FG	3FGA	PCT	FT	FTA	PCT	REB	AVG	A	TO	B	S	MIN	PTS	AVG
2004–05	33	148	296	0.500	0	1	0	62	99	0.626	178	5.4	42	69	49	51	643	358	10.8
2005–06	33	125	237	0.527	0	2	0	63	89	0.708	159	4.8	28	85	30	36	556	313	9.5
2006–07	36	188	347	0.542	0	0	0	73	111	0.658	251	7.0	90	98	39	68	948	449	12.5
2007–08	37	113	205	0.551	0	1	0	19	37	0.514	147	4.0	42	58	14	34	584	245	6.6
Totals	139	574	1085	0.529	0	4	0	217	336	0.646	735	5.3	202	310	132	189	2731	1365	9.8

== Awards and achievements ==
- 2009 WNBA All-Star Selection

== See also ==
- 2008 WNBA draft
- List of Connecticut women's basketball players with 1000 points
