= Nuria Martínez =

Spanish basketball player (born 1984)

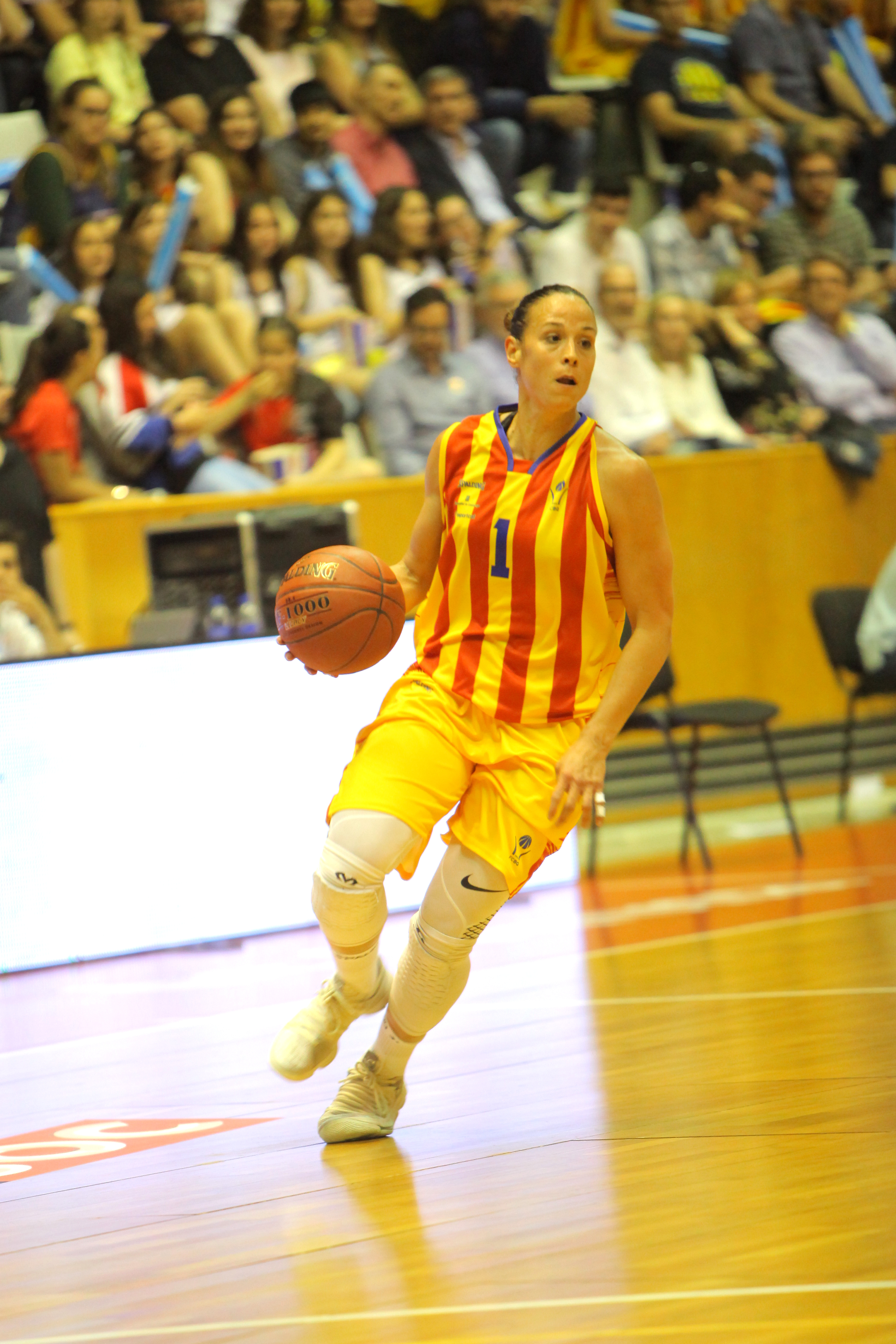

No. 1 – Spar CityLift Girona
- Position: Guard
- League: EuroCup Women; LF

Personal information
- Born: February 29, 1984 (age 42) Vilassar de Mar, Barcelona, Spain
- Listed height: 5 ft 9 in (1.75 m)
- Listed weight: 167 lb (76 kg)

Career information
- WNBA draft: 2004: 3rd round, 36th overall pick
- Drafted by: Sacramento Monarchs
- Playing career: 2002–present

Career history
- 2002–2003: UB-Barça
- 2003–2006: Perfumerías Avenida
- 2005: Minnesota Lynx
- 2007–2008: Dynamo Moscow
- 2008–2009: Famila Wüber Schio
- 2009–2010: Bracco Geas
- 2010: Minnesota Lynx
- 2010–2011: Ros Casares Valencia
- 2011–2012: Liomatic Umbertide
- 2012–2014: Kayseri Kaski Spor
- 2014–2016: Galatasaray
- 2016–2017: Famila Wüber Schio
- 2017–present: Spar CityLift Girona

Career highlights
- Spanish League champion (2006); Spanish Cup champion (2006; Turkish League champion (2015); Italian Cup champion (2017)
- Stats at Basketball Reference
Medals
Representing Spain
Women's basketball
World Championships
Silver medal – second place	2014 Turkey
Bronze medal – third place	2010 Czech Republic
EuroBasket
Silver medal – second place	2007 Italy
Bronze medal – third place	2003 Greece
Bronze medal – third place	2005 Turkey
Bronze medal – third place	2015 Hungary/Romania
Women's 3x3 basketball
Europe Cup
Silver medal – second place	2019 Debrecen

Nuria Martínez Prat (born February 29, 1984) is a Spanish professional basketball player for Spar CityLift Girona.

== Club career ==
Martínez made her debut in the Spanish top tier Liga Femenina in hometown club UB-Barça in 2002, soon signing for powerhouse CB Avenida, where she won the 2005-06 Spanish League and Cup. She played one game for WNBA team Minnesota Lynx in 2005. Martínez spent the following ten seasons mostly playing abroad in Russia (Dynamo Moscow, Turkey (Kayseri Kaski, Galatasaray S.K.) and Italy (Liomatic Umbertide, PF Schio, with just one season in Spain at Ros Casares Valencia and a second summer at Minnesota Lynx, playing 15 games in the 2010 WNBA season.

In 2017 she returned to Spain to play at Spar CityLift Girona.

== WNBA career statistics ==
Legend
GP	Games played	GS	Games started	MPG	Minutes per game	RPG	Rebounds per game
APG	Assists per game	SPG	Steals per game	BPG	Blocks per game	PPG	Points per game
TO	Turnovers per game	FG%	Field-goal percentage	3P%	3-point field-goal percentage	FT%	Free-throw percentage
**Bold**	Career best	°	League leader

=== Regular season ===
Year	Team	GP	GS	MPG	FG%	3P%	FT%	RPG	APG	SPG	BPG	TO	PPG
2005	Minnesota	1	0	2.0	.000	.000	.000	0.0	0.0	0.0	0.0	0.0	0.0
2010	Minnesota	**15**	0	**8.5**	**.182**	**.150**	**.667**	**0.7**	**0.7**	**0.3**	0.0	0.8	**1.8**
Career	2 years, 1 team	16	0	8.1	.176	.143	.667	0.7	0.7	0.3	0.0	0.8	1.7

== National team ==
She made her debut with Spain women's national basketball team at the age of 17. She played with the senior team for 15 years, from 2001 to 2015, with a total of 145 caps and 4 PPG. She participated in two Olympic Games, three World Championships and in four European Championships:

- 1999 FIBA Europe Under-16 Championship (youth)
- 6th 2000 FIBA Europe Under-18 Championship (youth)
- 5th 2002 FIBA Europe Under-18 Championship (youth)
- 2003 Eurobasket
- 6th 2004 Summer Olympics
- 2005 Eurobasket
- 8th 2006 World Championship
- 2007 Eurobasket
- 5th 2008 Summer Olympics
- 2010 World Championship
- 2014 World Championship
- 2015 Eurobasket
