= Quanitra Hollingsworth =

American-Turkish basketball player (born 1988)

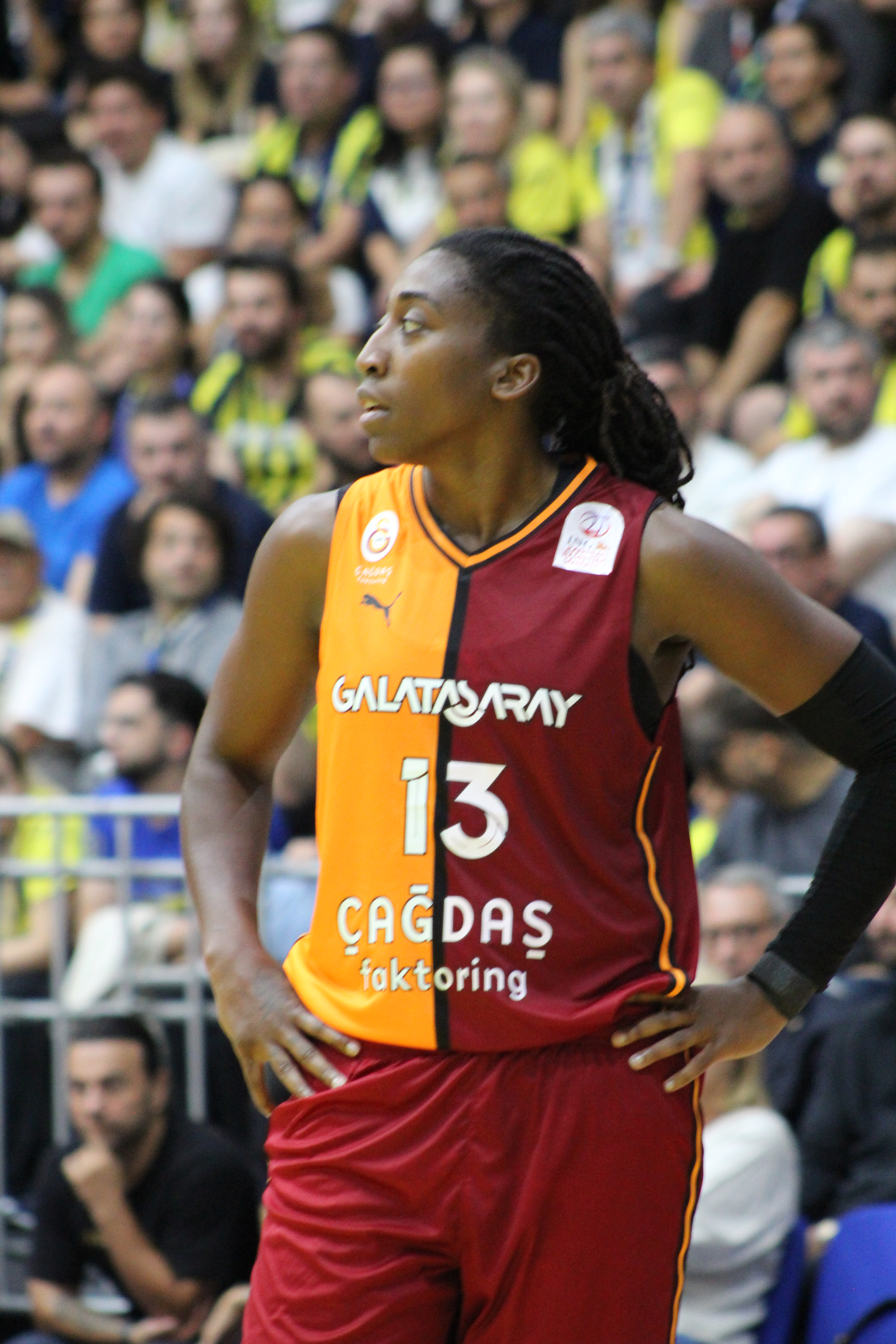

No. 24 – Fenerbahçe
- Position: Center
- League: Turkish Super League; EuroLeague Women

Personal information
- Born: November 15, 1988 (age 38) Portsmouth, Virginia, U.S.
- Listed height: 6 ft 6 in (1.98 m)
- Listed weight: 200 lb (91 kg)

Career information
- High school: Great Bridge (Chesapeake, Virginia)
- College: VCU (2005–2009)
- WNBA draft: 2009: 1st round, 9th overall pick
- Drafted by: Minnesota Lynx
- Playing career: 2009–present

Career history
- 2009–2010: Minnesota Lynx
- 2010–2011: VIČI-Aistės Kaunas
- 2011: New York Liberty
- 2011–2012: TTT Riga
- 2012–2013: UMMC Ekaterinburg
- 2013: Washington Mystics
- 2013–2016: Fenerbahçe
- 2015: Seattle Storm
- 2016–2018: Yakın Doğu Üniversitesi
- 2018–2019: Dynamo Kursk
- 2019–2020: BOTAŞ
- 2020–2021: Galatasaray
- 2021–2024: Çukurova Basketbol
- 2024–2025: Galatasaray
- 2026–present: Fenerbahçe

Career highlights
- 2× EuroLeague champion: (2013, 2023); FIBA EuroCup: 2016–17; FIBA Europe SuperCup Women champion (2026); EuroCup champion (2026); 2× Turkish Super League champion (2015–16, 2016–17); 5× Turkish Cup: 2014–15, 2015–16, 2016–17, 2017–18, 2021–22; 3× Turkish Presidential Cup: 2014, 2015, 2017; Russian Leagues: (2012-13); Russian Cup: (2012-13); First-team All-CAA (2009); 2× CAA All-Defensive Team (2006, 2009); CAA Freshman of the Year (2006); CAA All-Freshman Team (2006)
- Stats at WNBA.com
- Stats at Basketball Reference

Quanitra Hollingsworth (Turkish: Kuanitra Holingsvorth, born November 15, 1988) is an American-Turkish professional basketball player for Fenerbahçe.

In 2012 Hollingsworth acquired Turkish citizenship in order to be eligible to play for Turkey national women's basketball team. Therefore, she missed the 2012 WNBA season and 2014 WNBA season due to Turkish National Team commitments. She represented Turkey at the 2012 Summer Olympics.

== WNBA career statistics ==
Legend
GP	Games played	GS	Games started	MPG	Minutes per game	RPG	Rebounds per game
APG	Assists per game	SPG	Steals per game	BPG	Blocks per game	PPG	Points per game
TO	Turnovers per game	FG%	Field-goal percentage	3P%	3-point field-goal percentage	FT%	Free-throw percentage
**Bold**	Career best	°	League leader

=== Regular season ===
Year	Team	GP	GS	MPG	FG%	3P%	FT%	RPG	APG	SPG	BPG	TO	PPG
2009	Minnesota	**34**	**1**	12.8	.417	.000	**.703**	3.2	0.1	0.4	0.2	1.0	**4.8**
2010	Minnesota	25	0	7.3	.378	.000	.600	1.8	0.2	0.2	0.0	0.8	1.7
2011	New York	31	**1**	**16.9**	.524	.000	.679	**4.4**	**0.3**	**0.5**	**0.3**	1.4	4.6
2013	Washington	7	0	6.0	**.556**	.000	.500	1.4	**0.3**	0.3	0.3	0.1	1.7
2015	Seattle	27	0	12.3	.450	.000	.660	3.6	**0.3**	0.4	**0.3**	1.4	3.2
Career	5 years, 4 teams	124	2	12.2	.456	.000	.673	3.2	0.2	0.4	0.2	1.1	3.6

=== Playoffs ===
Year	Team	GP	GS	MPG	FG%	3P%	FT%	RPG	APG	SPG	BPG	TO	PPG
2011	New York	**3**	0	**8.7**	**.571**	.000	**1.000**	**1.7**	0.0	**0.3**	**0.3**	1.3	**3.3**
2013	Washington	2	0	2.0	.000	.000	.000	0.0	0.0	0.0	0.0	0.5	0.0
Career	2 years, 2 teams	5	0	6.0	.571	.000	1.000	1.0	0.0	0.2	0.2	1.0	2.0

== VCU statistics ==
Legend
GP	Games played	GS	Games started	MPG	Minutes per game
FG%	Field goal percentage	3P%	3-point field goal percentage	FT%	Free throw percentage
RPG	Rebounds per game	APG	Assists per game	SPG	Steals per game
BPG	Blocks per game	PPG	Points per game	**Bold**	Career high

Year	Team	GP	Points	FG%	3P%	FT%	RPG	APG	SPG	BPG	PPG
2005–06	VCU	28	412	51.5	–	**67.5**	**11.1**	1.0	**1.3**	**2.3**	14.7
2006–07	VCU	29	396	**53.2**	–	58.5	9.4	**1.3**	1.0	1.3	13.7
2007–08	VCU	23	307	49.4	**100.0**	61.4	9.5	0.7	**1.3**	1.1	13.3
2008–09	VCU	**33**	**489**	51.7	–	64.1	9.5	0.5	0.8	1.1	**14.8**
Career	VCU	113	1604	51.5	50.0	62.8	9.9	0.9	1.1	1.4	14.2

== Honours ==
- **UMMC Ekaterinburg**
  - EuroLeague Women : 2013
  - Russian Leagues : 2013
  - Russian Cup : 2013
- **Fenerbahçe Istanbul**
  - Turkish Women's Basketball League: 2015–16
  - Turkish Cup: 2015, 2016
  - Presidential Cup: 2013, 2014, 2015
- **Yakın Doğu Üniversitesi**
  - FIBA EuroCup: 2016–17
  - Turkish Women's Basketball League: 2016–17
  - Turkish Cup: 2017, 2018
  - Presidential Cup: 2017
- **Çukurova Basketbol**
  - Turkish Cup: 2022

== See also ==
- Turkish women in sports
