= 2009 Minnesota Lynx season =

Sports season

- Head coach: Jennifer Gillom
- Arena: Target Center

Results
- Record: 14–20 (.412)
- Place: 5th (Western)
- Playoff finish: Did not qualify

Media
- Television: Fox Sports North

The 2009 Minnesota Lynx season was the 11th season for the Minnesota Lynx of the Women's National Basketball Association, and the first and only season under head coach Jennifer Gillom.

The Lynx failed to improve their 16-18 record from 2008 and missed the playoffs for the fifth consecutive season.

== Offseason ==
=== Dispersal Draft ===
Based on the Lynx's 2008 record, they would pick 4th in the Houston Comets dispersal draft. The Lynx picked Roneeka Hodges.

=== WNBA draft ===
The following are the Lynx's selections in the 2009 WNBA draft.

Round	Pick	Player	Nationality	School/Team/Country
1	4	Renee Montgomery	United States	Connecticut
1	9 (from L.A. via Wash.)	Quanitra Hollingsworth	United States	Virginia Commonwealth
2	15 (from Wash.)	Rashanda McCants	United States	North Carolina
3	30	Emily Fox	United States	Minnesota

=== Transactions ===
- July 17: The Lynx signed Tasha Humphrey and waived Christi Thomas.
- June 5: The Lynx waived Tye'sha Fluker, Emily Fox, and Anna DeForge.
- June 3: The Lynx promoted Jennifer Gillom as head coach to replace Don Zierden
- June 1: The Lynx signed Tye'sha Fluker.
- May 30: The Lynx waived Kamersha Hairston and Aisha Mohammed.
- May 11: The Lynx signed Kamesha Hairston and Aisha Mohammed to training camp contracts.
- May 7: The Lynx signed Roneeka Hodges and renounced the rights to Kristi Harrower.
- May 5: The Lynx traded Noelle Quinn to the Los Angeles Sparks in exchange for Rafaella Masciadri and a first-round 2010 WNBA Draft pick.
- April 22: The Lynx waived Navonda Moore.
- January 30: The Lynx traded Lindsey Harding, their second-round draft picks in 2009 (23rd overall) and 2010 to the Washington Mystics for their first-round (ninth overall) and second round (15th overall) draft picks in the 2009 draft.
- January 30: The Lynx traded Nicole Ohlde to the Phoenix Mercury for Kelly Miller and LaToya Pringle.
- January 30: The Lynx signed-and-traded Vanessa Hayden to the Los Angeles Sparks for Christi Thomas.
- January 9: The Lynx waived Kristen Rasmussen.
- March 14, 2008: The Lynx swapped second-round 2009 Draft picks with the Connecticut Sun as part of the Kristen Rasmussen/Tamika Raymond transaction.

Date	Trade	
March 14, 2008	To Minnesota Lynx	To Connecticut Sun
March 14, 2008	23rd 2009 Draft pick and Kristen Rasmussen	17th 2009 Draft pick and Tamika Raymond
January 30, 2009	To Minnesota Lynx	To Los Angeles Sparks
January 30, 2009	Christi Thomas	Vanessa Hayden
January 30, 2009	To Minnesota Lynx	To Phoenix Mercury
January 30, 2009	Kelly Miller and LaToya Pringle	Nicole Ohlde
January 30, 2009	To Minnesota Lynx	To Washington Mystics
January 30, 2009	9th and 15th 2009 Draft picks	Lindsey Harding, 23rd 2009 Draft pick and the second-round 2010 Draft pick
May 5, 2009	To Minnesota Lynx	To Los Angeles Sparks
May 5, 2009	Rafaella Masciadri and a first-round 2010 WNBA Draft pick	Noelle Quinn

=== Free agents ===
==== Additions ====
Player	Signed	Former team
Roneeka Hodges	December 8, 2008	Houston Comets
Kelly Miller	January 30, 2009	Phoenix Mercury
LaToya Pringle	January 30, 2009	Phoenix Mercury
Rafaella Masciadri	May 5, 2009	Los Angeles Sparks
Tasha Humphrey	July 17, 2009	Washington Mystics

==== Subtractions ====
Player	Left	New team
Kristen Rasmussen	January 9, 2009	Detroit Shock
Vanessa Hayden	January 30, 2009	Los Angeles Sparks
Nicole Ohlde	January 30, 2009	Phoenix Mercury
Lindsey Harding	January 30, 2009	Washington Mystics
Navonda Moore	April 22, 2009	free agent
Noelle Quinn	May 5, 2009	Los Angeles Sparks
Emily Fox	June 5, 2009	free agent
Anna DeForge	June 5, 2009	free agent
LaToya Thomas	2009	free agent

== Roster ==
2009 Minnesota Lynx roster
Players
Coaches

Pos.	No.	Nat.	Name	Height	Weight	From
F/C	21	(United States)	Anosike, Nicky	6' 4" (1.93m)	211 lb (96kg)	Tennessee
G	33	(United States)	Augustus, Seimone (injured)	6' 0" (1.83m)	179 lb (81kg)	LSU
G	5	(United States)	Hodges, Roneeka	5' 11" (1.8m)	165 lb (75kg)	Florida State
C	9	(United States)	Hollingsworth, Quanitra	6' 5" (1.96m)	201 lb (91kg)	VCU
F	24	(United States)	Houston, Charde	6' 1" (1.85m)	189 lb (86kg)	Connecticut
C	34	(United States)	Humphrey, Tasha	6' 3" (1.91m)	190 lb (86kg)	Georgia
F	8	(United States)	McCants, Rashanda	6' 1" (1.85m)	161 lb (73kg)	North Carolina
PG	2	(United States)	Miller, Kelly	5' 10" (1.78m)	140 lb (64kg)	Georgia
F	12	(Spain)	Montañana, Anna	6' 1" (1.85m)	190 lb (86kg)	George Washington
G	20	(United States)	Montgomery, Renee	5' 7" (1.7m)	139 lb (63kg)	Connecticut
G	11	(United States)	Wiggins, Candice	5' 11" (1.8m)	154 lb (70kg)	Stanford

Head coach
(United States) Jennifer Gillom (Mississippi)
Assistant coaches
(United States) Jim Davis (Tennessee Wesleyan)
(United States) Jim Petersen (Minnesota)
Athletic trainer
(United States) Chuck Barta (UW–La Crosse)
Strength and conditioning coach
(United States) Katie Murphy

Legend

- (C) Team captain
- (DP) Unsigned draft pick
- (FA) Free agent
- (S) Suspended
- Injured

WNBA roster page

== Season standings ==
Western Conference	W	L	PCT	GB	Home	Road	Conf.
Phoenix Mercury ^{x}	23	11	.676	–	12–5	11–6	13–7
Seattle Storm ^{x}	20	14	.588	3.0	13–4	7–10	13–7
Los Angeles Sparks ^{x}	18	16	.529	5.0	11–6	7–10	11–9
San Antonio Silver Stars ^{x}	15	19	.441	8.0	10–7	5–12	10–10
Minnesota Lynx ^{o}	14	20	.412	9.0	9–8	5–12	7–13
Sacramento Monarchs ^{o}	12	22	.353	11.0	7–10	5–12	6–14

== Schedule ==
=== Preseason ===
2009 Game Log: Preseason

Game	Date	Time (ET)	Opponent	Score	High points	High rebounds	High assists	Location/Attendance	Record
1	May 23	1:00pm	Indiana	51-68	Hollingsworth (14)	Pringle (6)	Montgomery (3)	College of St. Benedict; 475	0-1

=== Regular season ===
2009 Game Log: Regular Season
June

Game	Date	Time (ET)	Opponent	TV	Score	High points	High rebounds	High assists	Location/Attendance	Record
1	June 6	8:00pm	Chicago	NBA TV; FSN-N	102-85	Augustus (23)	Anosike, Houston (5)	Anosike (8)	Target Center; 8,708	1-0
2	June 7	7:00pm	@ Indiana	FSI	96-74	Houston (23)	Anosike, Augustus, Houston (5)	Houston (4)	Conseco Fieldhouse; 9,234	2-0
3	June 10	8:00pm	Los Angeles		87-76	Augustus (30)	Augustus (9)	Anosike, Miller (5)	Target Center; 7,444	3-0
4	June 12	8:00pm	Seattle		71-88	Houston (18)	Anosike (7)	Augustus, Montgomery (3)	Target Center; 6,423	3-1
5	June 16	10:00pm	@ Sacramento		86-83	Augustus (30)	Anosike, Wiggins, Hollingsworth (5)	Wiggins (6)	ARCO Arena; 7,736	4-1
6	June 17	10:00pm	@ Phoenix		80-104	Anosike, Houston (21)	Anosike (10)	McCants (4)	US Airways Center; 6,524	4-2
7	June 19	10:00pm	@ Seattle		62-90	Wiggins (12)	Anosike (7)	Houston, Wiggins (2)	KeyArena; 7,607	4-3
8	June 23	8:00pm	New York		69-57	Wiggins (25)	Hollingsworth (7)	Wiggins (5)	Target Center; 5,620	5-3
9	June 27	8:00pm	Phoenix	NBA TV; FSN-N	109-80	Hodges, Wiggins (22)	Anosike (8)	Miller (8)	Target Center; 5,911	6-3
10	June 30	7:00pm	@ Atlanta	ESPN2	91-85	Wiggins (23)	Anosike (12)	Anosike, Houston, Wiggins (4)	Philips Arena; 7,686	7-3

July

Game	Date	Time (ET)	Opponent	TV	Score	High points	High rebounds	High assists	Location/Attendance	Record
11	July 2	8:00pm	Sacramento	NBA TV; FSN-N	68-74	Hodges (15)	Anosike (8)	Anosike (7)	Target Center; 6,920	7-4
12	July 7	8:00pm	Washington		96-94 (OT)	Anosike (24)	Houston (8)	Anosike, Miller (4)	Target Center; 7,171	8-4
13	July 10	8:00pm	San Antonio		61-77	Wiggins (15)	Anosike (12)	Hodges, Miller (2)	Target Center; 7,409	8-5
14	July 12	7:00pm	@ San Antonio	NBA TV; KMYS	83-76	Houston (26)	Anosike, Houston (8)	Anosike, Wiggins (4)	AT&T Center; 6,568	9-5
15	July 15	1:00pm	Atlanta	NBA TV; FSN-N	77-91	Anosike (22)	Houston (12)	Montgomery (7)	Target Center; 11,245	9-6
16	July 19	8:00pm	@ Seattle	NBA TV; FSN-NW	69-72	Anosike, Hodges, Wiggins (12)	Anosike (11)	McCants (3)	KeyArena; 6,912	9-7
17	July 23	10:00pm	@ Phoenix		99-86	Anosike (21)	Houston (9)	Anosike (5)	US Airways Center; 7,360	10-7
18	July 27	8:00pm	Los Angeles		70-76	Hodges (14)	Anosike (6)	Hodges (4)	Target Center; 7,216	10-8
19	July 30	7:30pm	@ Detroit		83-91	Houston, McCants (14)	Anosike, Hollingsworth, Houston (5)	Hodges, Kelly Miller, Montanana	Palace of Auburn Hills; 9,314	10-9

August

Game	Date	Time (ET)	Opponent	TV	Score	High points	High rebounds	High assists	Location/Attendance	Record
20	August 1	8:00pm	Phoenix		74-87	Hollingsworth (17)	Anosike (10)	Anosike (5)	Target Center; 6,631	10-10
21	August 7	8:00pm	Connecticut	NBA TV; FSN-N	95-88	Montgomery (24)	Anosike (12)	Montgomery, Wiggins (3)	Target Center; 8,134	11-10
22	August 9	6:00pm	San Antonio		87-89	Anosike (24)	Hodges, Hollingsworth (8)	Wiggins (4)	Target Center; 7,764	11-11
23	August 13	8:00pm	Indiana		81-91	Wiggins (23)	Anosike (16)	Hodges (3)	Target Center; 7,156	11-12
24	August 15	8:00pm	@ Chicago		76-79	Hodges (25)	Anosike, Hodges (8)	Hodges, Wiggins (6)	UIC Pavilion; 3,877	11-13
25	August 19	10:30pm	@ Los Angeles		63-78	Montgomery (16)	McCants (8)	Montgomery (4)	STAPLES Center; 9,181	11-14
26	August 22	7:00pm	@ Connecticut		94-98	Humphrey, Wiggins (21)	Humphrey (7)	Hodges, Montgomery (4)	Mohegan Sun Arena; 7,803	11-15
27	August 23	4:00pm	@ New York		67-80	Anosike (18)	Wiggins (7)	5 players (2)	Madison Square Garden; 8,481	11-16
28	August 28	8:00pm	Sacramento		100-95	Miller (18)	Anosike (6)	Anosike (5)	Target Center; 8,782	12-16
29	August 30	4:00pm	@ Washington		75-81	Houston (20)	Anosike (6)	Wiggins (4)	Verizon Center; 12,241	12-17

September

Game	Date	Time (ET)	Opponent	TV	Score	High points	High rebounds	High assists	Location/Attendance	Record
30	September 1	8:00pm	@ San Antonio		82-84 (2OT)	Wiggins (19)	Anosike (11)	Anosike (3)	AT&T Center; 4,881	12-18
31	September 5	8:00pm	Seattle	NBA TV; FSN-N	76-68	Houston (22)	Humphrey (7)	Houston (4)	Target Center; 8,170	13-18
32	September 9	8:00pm	Detroit		75-72	McCants, Montanana, Montgomery (12)	McCants (6)	Montanana, Wiggins (3)	Target Center; 7,423	14-18
33	September 11	10:30pm	@ Los Angeles	NBA TV; FSNW	61-90	Wiggins (15)	Houston (8)	Miller, Montgomery, Wiggins (3)	STAPLES Center; 13,764	14-19
34	September 13	9:00pm	@ Sacramento		66-88	Houston (18)	Hollingsworth (9)	Montgomery (5)	ARCO Arena; 10,212	14-20

All games are viewable on WNBA LiveAccess

== Regular Season Statistics ==
Legend
GP	Games played	GS	Games started	MPG	Minutes per game	RPG	Rebounds per game
APG	Assists per game	SPG	Steals per game	BPG	Blocks per game	PPG	Points per game
FG%	Field-goal percentage	3P%	3-point field-goal percentage	FT%	Free-throw percentage	TO	Turnovers per game
PF	Fouls per game		Team leader		League leader

=== Player statistics ===
Player	GP	GS	MPG	RPG	APG	SPG	BPG	PPG
Nicky Anosike	0	0	00.0	0.0	0.0	0.00	0.00	0.0
Seimone Augustus	0	0	00.0	0.0	0.0	0.00	0.00	0.0
Roneeka Hodges	0	0	00.0	0.0	0.0	0.00	0.00	0.0
Quanitra Hollingsworth	0	0	00.0	0.0	0.0	0.00	0.00	0.0
Charde Houston	0	0	00.0	0.0	0.0	0.00	0.00	0.0
Rashanda McCants	0	0	00.0	0.0	0.0	0.00	0.00	0.0
Kelly Miller	0	0	00.0	0.0	0.0	0.00	0.00	0.0
Renee Montgomery	0	0	00.0	0.0	0.0	0.00	0.00	0.0
LaToya Pringle	0	0	00.0	0.0	0.0	0.00	0.00	0.0
Christi Thomas	0	0	00.0	0.0	0.0	0.00	0.00	0.0
Candice Wiggins	0	0	00.0	0.0	0.0	0.00	0.00	0.0

=== Team statistics ===
Team	FG%	3P%	FT%	RPG	APG	SPG	BPG	TO	PF	PPG
Minnesota Lynx	.000	.000	.000	00.0	00.0	0.0	0.0	00.0	00.0	00.0
Opponents	.000	.000	.000	00.0	00.0	0.0	0.0	00.0	00.0	00.0

== Awards and honors ==
- Seimone Augustus was named WNBA Western Conference Player of the Week for the week of June 15, 2009.
- Candice Wiggins was named WNBA Western Conference Player of the Week for the week of June 29, 2009.
- Nicky Anosike was named to the 2009 WNBA All-Star Team as a Western Conference reserve.
- Charde Houston was named to the 2009 WNBA All-Star Team as a Western Conference reserve.
- Renee Montgomery was named to the All-Rookie Team.
- Nicky Anosike was named to the All-Defensive First Team.
