= Gabriela Mărginean =

Romanian basketball player (born 1987)

No. 44 – İzmit Belediyespor
- Position: Forward
- League: Turkish Super League

Personal information
- Born: February 12, 1987 (age 39) Cluj-Napoca, Romania
- Listed height: 6 ft 0 in (1.83 m)

Career information
- College: Drexel (2006–2010)
- WNBA draft: 2010: 3rd round, 26th overall pick
- Drafted by: Minnesota Lynx
- Playing career: 2010–present

Career history
- 2010: Minnesota Lynx
- 2010–2011: Panathinaikos
- 2011–2012: Arras Pays d'Artois
- 2012–2013: CSM Târgovişte
- 2013–2014: İstanbul Üniversitesi
- 2014–2015: AGÜ Spor
- 2015–2017: Perfumerías Avenida
- 2017–2018: AGÜ Spor
- 2018–2019: Adana Basketbol
- 2019–2020: Çukurova Basketbol
- 2020–2021: Landerneau Bretagne Basket
- 2021–present: İzmit Belediyespor

Career highlights
- CAA Player of the Year (2009); 3x First-team All-CAA (2008–2010); CAA Freshman of the Year (2007); CAA All-Freshman Team (2007)
- Stats at Basketball Reference

Gabriela Mărginean (born 12 February 1987 in Cluj-Napoca) is a Romanian professional women's basketball player who plays for the Turkey club İzmit Belediyespor.

== College career ==
Mărginean was a two-sport athlete at Drexel University and led the NCAA in made free throws in her sophomore season. Her 2,581 career points while at Drexel makes her Philadelphia's highest scoring women's basketball player. This point total also med her the highest scoring athlete in the history of the CAA until 2013, when she was surpassed by Elena Delle Donne.

While playing for the Drexel Dragons women's basketball team Mărginean played in 125 games and averaged 20.6 points and 7.6 rebounds per game. Marginean led Drexel to its first-ever NCAA Tournament appearance in 2009.

=== Statistic ===
Season	GP	FG-FGA	Pct	3FG-FGA	Pct	FT-FTA	Pct	Reb Avg	A	Blk	Stl	Pts Avg
2010	31	255-530	.481	39-98	.398	178-200	.890	7.7	60	5	60	23.5
2009	33	252-529	.476	22-63	.349	243-271	.897	7.3	29	2	52	23.3
2008	30	213-428	.498	26-75	.347	118-129	.915	7.1	50	3	53	19.0
2007	31	184-434	.424	2-13	.154	145-169	.858	8.2	33	4	38	16.6
Totals	125	904-1921	.471	89-249	.357	FT-FTA	Pct	Reb Avg	A	Blk	Stl	20.6

=== Awards and honors ===
- 2010 All-CAA First Team
- 2009 PSWA Outstanding Amateur Athlete
- 2009 CAA Player of the Year
- 2009 All-CAA First Team
- 2009 Dean Ehlers Leadership Award
- 2009 CAA Tournament MVP
- 2009 University of Colorado Coors Classic All-Tournament Team
- 2009 CAA Preseason Player of the Year
- 2008 All-CAA First Team
- 2007 All-CAA Third Team
- 2007 CAA Rookie of the Year

== Professional career ==
=== WNBA ===
Mărginean was drafted to the Minnesota Lynx, the 26th pick of the 2010 WNBA draft. In May the Lynx activated Rebekkah Brunson and Mărginean was waived from the roster. She is the second Romanian who has played in the WNBA after Florina Pașcalău who was the player of Seattle Storm in 2008.

=== Europe ===
Later she played for Panathinaikos Athens. Her stats read 17.3 points, 7.6 boards, 2.2 steals and 1.5 assists per game. Eurobasket.com named her All-Greek League Bosman Player of the Year.

Gabriela Mărginean joined Arras Pays d'Artois in the summer of 2010. She appeared 26 times in Ligue Féminine de Basketball averaging 12.3 points and 3.6 rebounds. She managed to win in the 2012 French Cup handing a 58–64 loss to Bourges to take the trophy. Mărginean was one of the best Arras players in the final. She scored 11 points and pulled down 6 rebounds for 35 minutes on the court. Thanks to this victory Arras also booked a spot for the EuroLeague Women 2012–13 season. In EuroCup, Marginean added 16.9 ppg and 4.8 rpg for 10 games.

On July 7, 2012, it was reported that the Romanian champions CSM Târgovişte have signed Gabriela Mărginean.

== WNBA career statistics ==
Legend
GP	Games played	GS	Games started	MPG	Minutes per game	RPG	Rebounds per game
APG	Assists per game	SPG	Steals per game	BPG	Blocks per game	PPG	Points per game
TO	Turnovers per game	FG%	Field-goal percentage	3P%	3-point field-goal percentage	FT%	Free-throw percentage
**Bold**	Career best	°	League leader

=== Regular season ===
Year	Team	GP	GS	MPG	FG%	3P%	FT%	RPG	APG	SPG	BPG	TO	PPG
2010	Minnesota	4	0	3.0	.200	.000	.000	1.0	0.3	0.3	0.3	0.3	0.5

== International career ==
Mărginean is currently the best player on Romania women's national basketball team as she averaged 19.6 points per game in eight games in EuroBasket Women 2013 qualifiers.
