= Lindsey Pluimer =

American basketball player

Personal information
- Born: July 3, 1986 (age 40) Lakewood, California, U.S.
- Listed height: 6 ft 4 in (1.93 m)

Career information
- High school: San Clemente (San Clemente, California)
- College: UCLA (2004–2008)
- WNBA draft: 2008: 2nd round, 20th overall pick
- Drafted by: Washington Mystics
- Position: Forward

Career highlights
- First-team All-Pac-10 (2008); Pac-10 All-Freshman Team (2005); McDonald's All-American (2004)
- Stats at Basketball Reference

Lindsey Paige Pluimer (born July 3, 1986) is an American former professional basketball player. After her retirement she started the nonprofit organization, With My Own Two Hands Foundation which provides clean water and sustainable agriculture projects in East Africa.

== College ==
When Pluimer left UCLA, she was the twelfth all-time leading scorer and tenth all-time leading rebounder in the school's women's basketball history. She was also the first UCLA Bruin in the NCAA era to start in every game she played in.

== UCLA statistics ==
Legend
GP	Games played	GS	Games started	MPG	Minutes per game
FG%	Field goal percentage	3P%	3-point field goal percentage	FT%	Free throw percentage
RPG	Rebounds per game	APG	Assists per game	SPG	Steals per game
BPG	Blocks per game	PPG	Points per game	**Bold**	Career high

Year	Team	GP	Points	FG%	3P%	FT%	RPG	APG	SPG	BPG	PPG
2004–05	UCLA	28	284	43.1	30.2	75.9	6.4	0.6	**1.0**	0.6	10.1
2005–06	UCLA	32	339	48.5	25.9	79.5	5.4	1.5	0.7	0.5	10.6
2006–07	UCLA	32	**495**	**48.8**	37.7	81.7	5.7	**1.8**	**1.0**	0.8	**15.5**
2007–08	UCLA	31	438	41.8	**38.5**	**83.5**	**6.5**	1.5	0.8	**1.1**	14.1
Career	UCLA	123	1556	45.5	35.3	80.8	6.0	1.4	0.9	0.8	12.7

== WNBA ==
Pluimer was selected in the 2008 WNBA draft by the Washington Mystics. When she was drafted she reunited with her former UCLA teammate Nikki Blue.
