= Candice Wiggins =

American basketball player (born 1987)

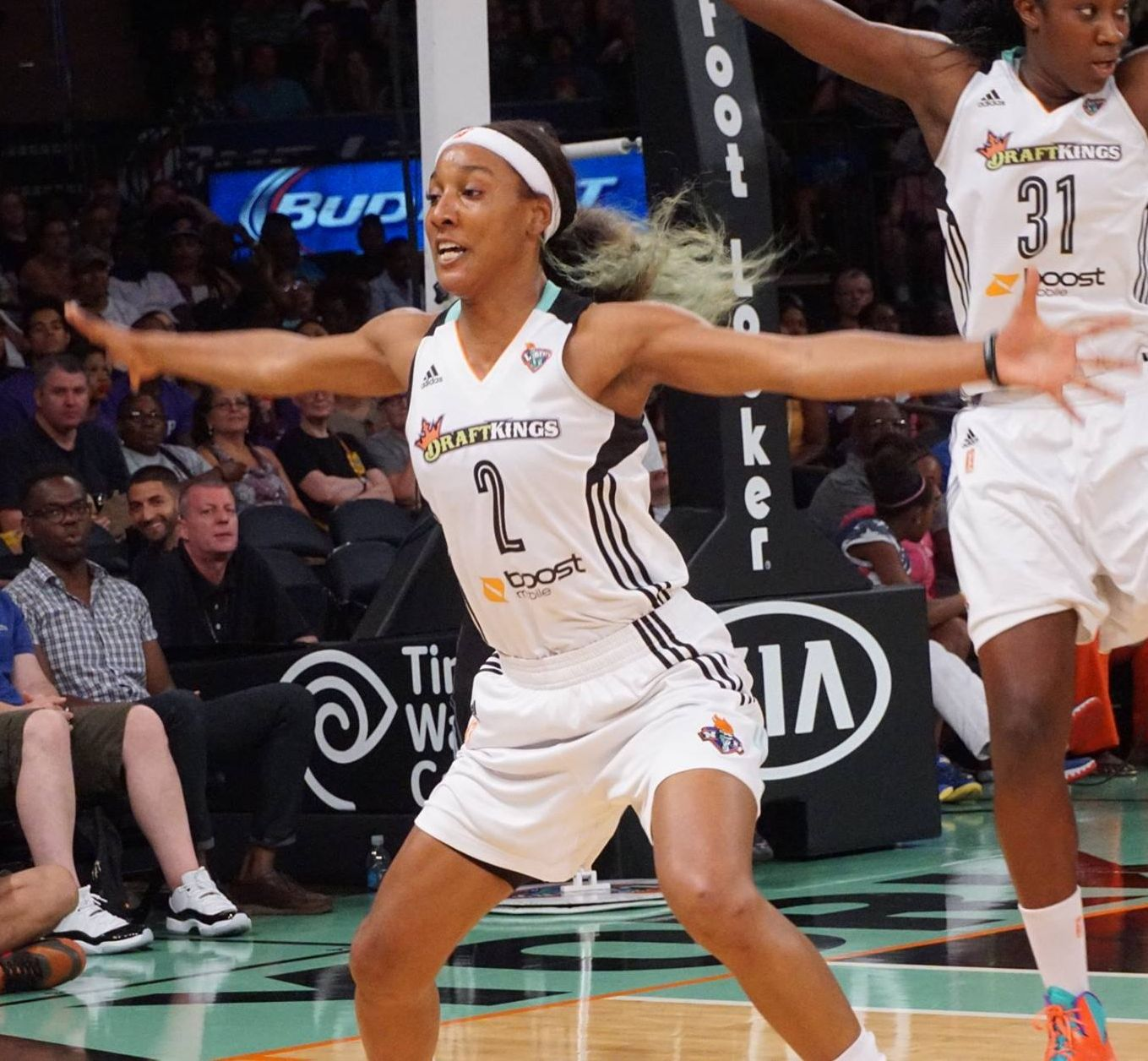

Personal information
- Born: February 14, 1987 (age 39) Baltimore, Maryland, U.S.
- Listed height: 5 ft 11 in (1.80 m)
- Listed weight: 154 lb (70 kg)

Career information
- High school: La Jolla Country Day (La Jolla, California)
- College: Stanford (2004–2008)
- WNBA draft: 2008: 1st round, 3rd overall pick
- Drafted by: Minnesota Lynx
- Playing career: 2008–2015
- Position: Point guard / shooting guard

Career history
- 2008–2012: Minnesota Lynx
- 2008–2009: Ros Casares Valencia
- 2009–2010: Sony Athinaikos Athens
- 2013: Tulsa Shock
- 2014: Los Angeles Sparks
- 2015: New York Liberty

Career highlights
- WNBA champion (2011); WNBA Sixth Woman of the Year (2008); WNBA All-Rookie Team (2008); Senior CLASS Award (2008); Wade Trophy (2008); First-team All-American – AP (2008); 3× Second-team All-American – AP (2005–2007); 3× All-American – USBWA (2006–2008); 4× Kodak/State Farm Coaches' All-American (2005–2008); First-team All-Pac 10 (2008); 3× Pac-10 Player of the Year (2005, 2006, 2008); 3× Pac-12 Tournament MOP (2005, 2007, 2008); 3× All-Pac 10 (2005–2007); USA Basketball Female Athlete of the Year (2007); USBWA National Co-Freshman of the Year (2005); Pac-10 Freshman of the Year (2005); Pac-10 All-Freshman Team (2005); McDonald's All-American (2004)
- Stats at WNBA.com
- Stats at Basketball Reference
Medals
Women's basketball
Representing the United States
Pan American Games
Gold medal – first place	2007 Brazil	Team
FIBA Under-19 World Cup
Gold medal – first place	2005 Tunisia	Team
FIBA Under-18 Americas Championship
Gold medal – first place	2004 Puerto Rico	Team

Candice Dana Wiggins (born February 14, 1987) is an American former professional basketball player. She played college basketball for the Stanford Cardinal, becoming the all-time leading scorer in Stanford and Pac-10 women's basketball history. Throughout her playing career, Wiggins played for the Minnesota Lynx, Tulsa Shock, Los Angeles Sparks and New York Liberty of the Women's National Basketball Association (WNBA) and has played overseas in Spain and Greece. Wiggins has won a WNBA championship (2011) and a WNBA Sixth Woman of the Year (2008).

== Early life ==
Candice Wiggins was born in Baltimore, Maryland in 1987 where her father, Alan Wiggins, played Major League Baseball for the Baltimore Orioles. After playing for the Orioles, her father, with wife Angela, son Alan Jr., and daughters Cassandra and Candice moved back to the San Diego, California area, where he had previously played for the San Diego Padres.

When Wiggins was three years of age, she was hit by a car backing out of a driveway and almost lost one of her eyes. When Wiggins was in the first grade, she scored 30 points playing against fourth graders in basketball. By the time she was in fifth grade, she had to play on boys' teams so she could play at a competitive level.

Wiggins' father died of AIDS when Wiggins was only four years old. "It was a scary time. No one would talk about it," Wiggins recalls. "A young girl wants to know about her Dad dying of AIDS. But it was taboo," she said. Wiggins has partnered with Until There's A Cure (UTAC), a non-profit organization that raises awareness and funds to combat AIDS through the sale of The Bracelet.

== High school career ==
Wiggins attended La Jolla Country Day School in La Jolla, California for high school. She was a four-year letter-winner in both volleyball and basketball. In all four years of high school she was named CIF Division IV Player of the year for basketball. Wiggins was a McDonald's All-American as a Senior. She also led La Jolla Country Day to the state championship game in each of her four seasons, winning it twice. She also captained the United States Junior National Team that won gold. Many high school recruiting services listed her as the best shooting guard in the nation and a top five player in the Class of 2004.

== College career ==
=== Freshman year ===
When Wiggins came to Stanford University, she was offered a scholarship for both basketball and volleyball. As a freshman on the basketball team, Wiggins led the Cardinal to a 32–3 record and an Elite Eight appearance. She averaged 17.5 points per game and was named both the Pac-10 Conference Freshman of the Year and Player of The Year. This was the first time in the conference history that a freshman won the Player of the Year Award. Wiggins, along with Georgia's Tasha Humphrey, was named National Co-Freshman of the Year. She made second team All-American and was a Kodak All-American, the only freshman on either list.

=== Sophomore year ===
During her sophomore year, Wiggins led Stanford to a 26–8 record and another Elite Eight appearance where they lost to LSU. She averaged 21.8 points per game and made 90 three-pointers over the course of the season. She was again named Pac-10 Player of The Year and Second team All-American, as well as Kodak All-American.

=== Junior year ===
As a junior, Wiggins led Stanford to a 29–5 record and a No. 2 seed in the NCAA Tournament, but the Cardinal were upset in Round 2 by Florida State, 68–61. She missed 5 games due to ankle and hamstring injuries, but averaged 16.9 points per game. Devanei Hampton of Cal won the Pac-10 Player of the Year Award this season. However, Wiggins was the only Pac-10 Player to be a Kodak All-American as she again made second team.

Wiggins played for the USA team in the 2007 Pan American Games in Rio de Janeiro, Brazil. The team won all five games, earning the gold medal for the event.

=== Senior year ===
In her senior season, Stanford started the season ranked No. 8 but moved up the polls with victories over No. 3 Rutgers (thanks to Wiggins hitting 2 free throws with 0.1 seconds left), and No. 10 Baylor. On January 31, 2008, Wiggins scored 18 points in a win over USC at Maples Pavilion and passed Kate Starbird as the all-time leading scorer in Stanford women's basketball history. On March 2, 2008, she scored 24 points against Washington State to pass Lisa Leslie as the all-time leading scorer in Pac-10 women's basketball history. She was named the Pac-10 Player of The Year for the 2007–2008 season, the third time she had received the award.

On March 24, 2008, Wiggins scored a career-high 44 points, pulled down 10 rebounds, and dished out eight assists in an 88–54 win over UTEP as Stanford advanced to the Sweet Sixteen of the 2008 NCAA tournament. A week later, her 41 points propelled Stanford to its first Final Four appearance since 1997, where they would reach the final before losing to the University of Tennessee. During the NCAA Tournament, Wiggins became the only player in NCAA women's basketball history to score 40 or more points in multiple NCAA Tournament games.

Wiggins is one of only seven women's basketball players to have been a four-time All American. On April 4, 2008, Wiggins was awarded the Lowe's Senior CLASS Award. The following day, Wiggins was awarded the Wade Trophy as the best women's college basketball player in NCAA Division I.

Wiggins is a member of Delta Sigma Theta sorority, and became a member of the Omicron Chi Chapter in Spring 2007. She graduated from Stanford with a degree in communications in the spring of 2008.

== WNBA career ==
=== Early career (2008–2010) ===
Wiggins was chosen by the Minnesota Lynx as the third overall pick in the 2008 WNBA draft.

On May 18, 2008, Wiggins played in her first WNBA game. She scored 15 points, pulled down 4 rebounds, had four steals, and dished out four assists as the Lynx defeated the Detroit Shock, 84–70. Wiggins was named WNBA Rookie of the Month for the month of June 2008. She suffered an injury during the first quarter of a July 24, 2008 game against the Indiana Fever. She was removed from the court in a wheelchair. Wiggins went on to win the 2008 WNBA Sixth Woman of the Year Award and was also named to the WNBA All-Rookie Team after averaging a career-high 15.7 ppg off the bench for the Lynx.

In her second season, Wiggins became the starting point guard for the Lynx. On June 29, 2009, Wiggins was awarded the Player of the Week Award for the Western Conference.

In the 2010 season, Wiggins was moved back to the bench as a backup point guard after the Lynx traded for all-star Lindsay Whalen. In June 2010, Wiggins ruptured her Achilles tendon with just eight seconds remaining in a game against the New York Liberty; the injury ended her season after eight games.

=== Later career and WNBA championship (2011–2016) ===
Wiggins returned to action in 2011 as a primary backup at the guard position. The Lynx were much improved, and in September, Wiggins saw the first playoff action of her career. In October 2011, Wiggins won her first WNBA championship after the Lynx defeated the Atlanta Dream in the Finals.

On March 1, 2013, Wiggins was traded to the Tulsa Shock in a three-team deal.

Wiggins signed with the Los Angeles Sparks on April 2, 2014.

On March 9, 2015, Wiggins signed with the New York Liberty.

=== Retirement ===
On March 22, 2016, Wiggins announced her retirement from the WNBA after eight seasons. Despite being only 29 years old and without a career-threatening injury, Wiggins expressed in a letter about her retirement that she was ready to move on from playing professional basketball.

In a 2017 interview with The San Diego Union-Tribune, Wiggins revealed more about what led her to retire from basketball. Calling the league's culture "very, very harmful" and "toxic to me", she alleged that she had been bullied on the court throughout her WNBA career for being heterosexual and nationally popular. Wiggins added, "I wanted to play two more seasons of WNBA, but the experience didn't lend itself to my mental state." During the interview, she remarked:

Me being heterosexual and straight, and being vocal in my identity as a straight woman was huge. I would say 98 percent of the women in the WNBA are gay women. It was a conformist type of place. There was a whole different set of rules they (the other players) could apply."

Wiggins' remarks led to a major backlash from many WNBA players and other sports figures, but she largely stood by them. She did clarify her "98 percent" remark, saying: "It was my way to illustrate the isolation that I felt personally. I felt like the 2 percent versus the 98 percent."

== Career statistics ==
=== WNBA ===
Legend
GP	Games played	GS	Games started	MPG	Minutes per game	RPG	Rebounds per game
APG	Assists per game	SPG	Steals per game	BPG	Blocks per game	PPG	Points per game
TO	Turnovers per game	FG%	Field-goal percentage	3P%	3-point field-goal percentage	FT%	Free-throw percentage
**Bold**	Career best	°	League leader

†	Denotes seasons in which Wiggins won a WNBA championship

==== Regular season ====
Year	Team	GP	GS	MPG	FG%	3P%	FT%	RPG	APG	SPG	BPG	TO	PPG
2008	Minnesota	30	1	27.5	.403	.306	.817	**3.2**	**3.0**	**1.8**	**0.2**	1.9	**15.7**
2009	Minnesota	**34**	**34**	**29.9**	.375	.321	.893	2.9	2.6	1.2	**0.2**	2.4	13.1
2010	Minnesota	8	7	29.8	**.405**	**.457**	**.967**	2.8	2.1	**1.8**	0.0	2.4	13.8
2011^{†}	Minnesota	**34**	0	17.1	.386	.395	.625	1.9	1.5	0.5	**0.2**	0.9	5.9
2012	Minnesota	**34**	1	21.8	.360	.397	.865	2.1	2.0	0.7	0.1	1.8	6.8
2013	Tulsa	32	31	27.4	.363	.363	.792	2.9	2.0	1.2	**0.2**	1.8	10.1
2014	Los Angeles	17	0	13.9	.188	.250	.800	1.2	0.9	0.7	**0.2**	0.6	1.6
2015	New York	32	2	12.9	.318	.392	.684	1.9	0.8	0.4	0.1	1.0	2.8
Career	8 years, 4 teams	221	76	22.3	.371	.363	.833	2.4	1.9	1.0	0.2	1.6	8.6

==== Playoffs ====
Year	Team	GP	GS	MPG	FG%	3P%	FT%	RPG	APG	SPG	BPG	TO	PPG
2011^{†}	Minnesota	8	0	**16.0**	.345	.348	.667	1.6	1.3	0.3	**0.1**	1.1	4.0
2012	Minnesota	**9**	0	14.0	.160	.235	**1.000**	1.0	1.1	0.6	0.0	1.1	1.6
2014	Los Angeles	2	0	7.5	.000	.000	.000	0.5	0.0	0.5	0.0	0.0	0.0
2015	New York	6	0	14.7	**.409**	**.438**	**1.000**	**1.7**	**1.5**	**0.8**	0.0	1.2	**4.5**
Career	4 years, 3 teams	25	0	14.3	.291	.328	.800	1.3	1.2	0.5	0.0	1.0	2.9

=== College ===
Legend
GP	Games played	GS	Games started	MPG	Minutes per game
FG%	Field goal percentage	3P%	3-point field goal percentage	FT%	Free throw percentage
RPG	Rebounds per game	APG	Assists per game	SPG	Steals per game
BPG	Blocks per game	PPG	Points per game	**Bold**	Career high

Year	Team	GP	Points	FG%	3P%	FT%	RPG	APG	SPG	BPG	PPG
2004-05	Stanford	35	612	**48.3**	33.6	**83.5**	**5.4**	2.8	**2.4**	0.5	17.5
2005-06	Stanford	34	740	47.7	43.3	82.4	4.8	**3.5**	2.0	**0.6**	**21.8**
2006-07	Stanford	29	490	46.0	**44.1**	78.9	4.1	3.3	1.5	0.4	16.9
2007-08	Stanford	**39**	**787**	42.9	34.4	82.1	4.8	3.1	2.2	0.4	20.2
Career	Stanford	137	2629	46.0	39.1	82.2	4.8	3.2	2.1	0.5	19.2

== USA Basketball ==
Wiggins was a member of the USA Women's U18 team which won the gold medal at the FIBA Americas Championship in Mayaguez, Puerto Rico. The event was held in August 2004, when the USA team defeated Puerto Rico to win the championship. Wiggins was the third leading scorer for the team, averaging 15.2 points per game.

Wiggins continued with the team as it became the U19 team, and competed in the 2005 U19 World Championships in Tunis, Tunisia. The USA team won all eight games, winning the gold medal. Wiggins was the second leading scorer for the team, averaging 15.8 points per game and was second on the team for steals with 16.

=== U.S. National Team ===
Wiggins was invited to try out for the United States Senior National Team and was named as an injury replacement or alternate. Along with Candace Parker and Courtney Paris, she was one of the only college players to be named to the team. She spent the summer of 2007 playing in Chile with different United States National teams and was eventually named United States Basketball Female Athlete of The Year for 2007.

Wiggins was invited to the USA Basketball Women's National Team training camp in the fall of 2009. The team selected to play for the 2010 FIBA World Championship and the 2012 Olympics is usually chosen from these participants. At the conclusion of the training camp, the team will travel to Ekaterinburg, Russia, where they compete in the 2009 UMMC Ekaterinburg International Invitational.

In 2011, Wiggins was again chosen for the national team initial training camps, from which USA Basketball would select the team to represent the US in the 2012 Olympics, though Wiggins was ultimately not selected for the senior national team.

== Sports diplomacy ==
In September 2013 and November 2014, Wiggins traveled to Nicaragua and then Chile as a SportsUnited Sports Envoy for the U.S. Department of State. In this function, she worked with Jennifer Lacy and Alex English to conduct basketball clinics and events for more than 850 youth and women from underserved areas.

== See also ==
- 2008 WNBA draft
