= St. Peter's Girls High School =

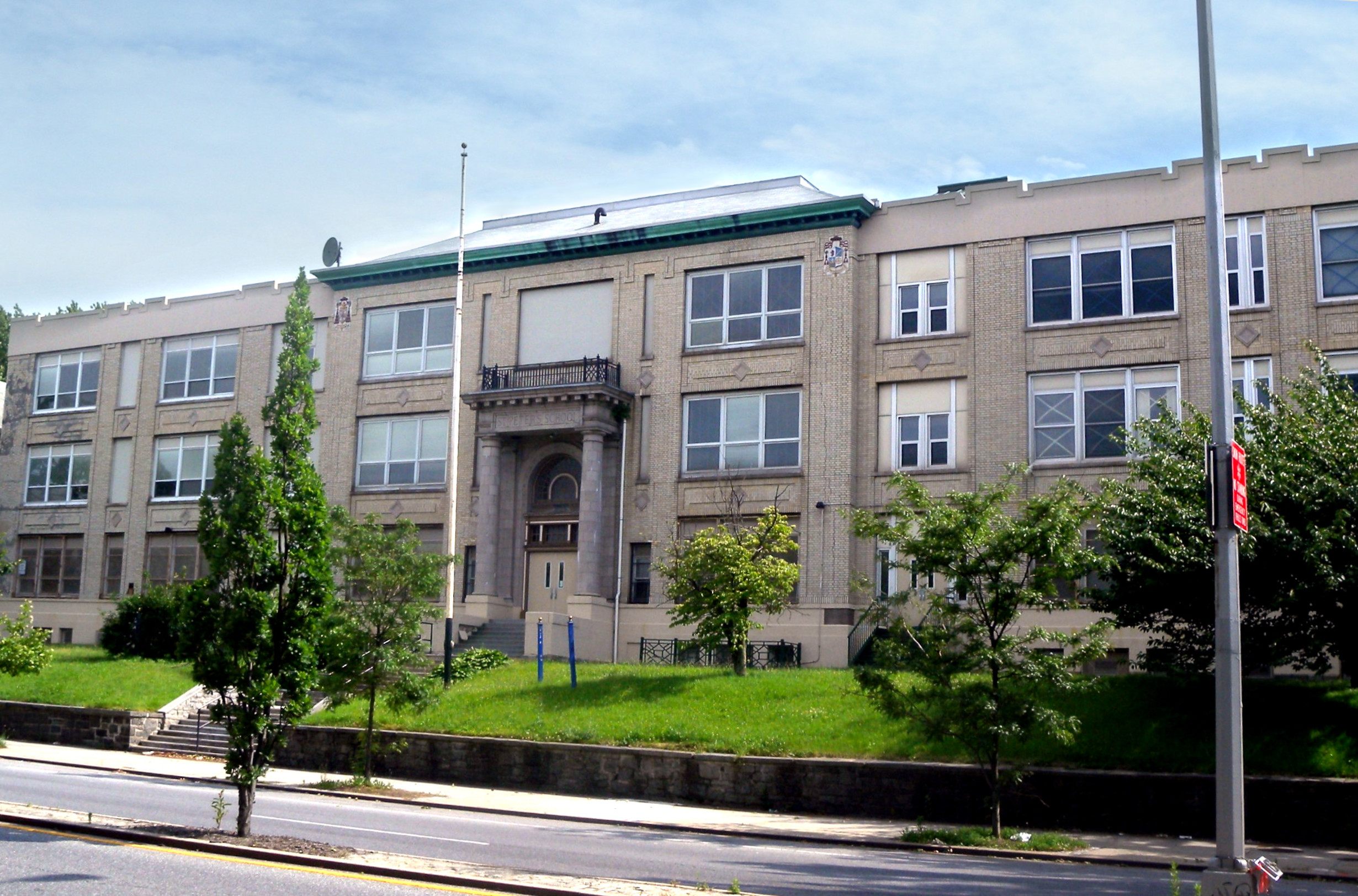

Location
- 300 Richmond; New York City (Saint George, Staten Island), New York 10301; United States; 40°38′51″N 74°5′0″W

Information
- Type: Private, All-Female
- Religious affiliations: Roman Catholic; Sisters of Charity
- Established: 1926
- Closed: 2011
- Grades: 9-12
- Colors: Blue and Gold
- Team name: Eagles

St. Peter's Girls High School was an all-girls, private, Roman Catholic high school on Staten Island in New York City, located within the Roman Catholic Archdiocese of New York.

== Background ==
In August 1852, the Sisters of Charity came to St. Peter's Church and established the first parish school in the church basement. St. Peter's Girls was the sister school of St. Peter's Boys High School on Henderson Avenue, because at one point in the late 1800s through early 1900s the Girls H.S., the Boys H.S., and the Elementary School were all in the same building that stands on Richmond Terrace.

The Archdiocese announced on February 11, 2011 that St. Peter's Girls High School would close at the end of June 2011 due to low enrollment. Initially the school was to be kept open, but the archdiocese decided to close it when the latest Test for Admission into Catholic High Schools (TACHS) revealed that an estimated 95 students were to attend in fall 2011.

In November 2011, it was announced that the New York Department of Education would open P.S. 59, also known as The Harborview School, at the St. Peter's site, according to the five-year capital plan amendment released by the Department. The city leases the building from the New York Archdiocese. Chancellor Dennis M. Walcott and local officials held a ribbon-cutting ceremony on November 15, 2013 at P.S. 59, The Harbor View School, at 300 Richmond Terrace in the St. George area of Staten Island. The leased facility opened September 9, 2013, after the city's School Construction Authority completely renovated and restored the 80-year-old building. Currently serving students in pre-kindergarten and kindergarten, the new school will expand to include grades pre-kindergarten through five by adding one grade level each year, eventually serving 372 students. The $11.3 million contract award for the renovation went to Volmar Construction, Inc. and was designed by SBLM Architects, PC. The facility features 20 classrooms, a special education and resource room, a room for both science and art, and a separate music room. It also includes a gymnasium, auditorium, library and cafeteria, as well as an early-childhood play area. Admission is by lottery, meaning it is a school of choice with applications going to any interested family in the borough.

== Notable alumni ==
- Nicky Anosike – American basketball player (born 1986)
- Jennifer Derevjanik – American basketball player (born 1982)
