= Alexis Hornbuckle =

American basketball player (born 1985)

Personal information
- Born: October 16, 1985 (age 41) Charleston, West Virginia, U.S.
- Listed height: 5 ft 10 in (1.78 m)
- Listed weight: 155 lb (70 kg)

Career information
- High school: Capital (Charleston, West Virginia); South Charleston (South Charleston, West Virginia)
- College: Tennessee (2004–2008)
- WNBA draft: 2008: 1st round, 4th overall pick
- Drafted by: Detroit Shock
- Playing career: 2008–2013
- Position: Guard
- Number: 22, 14

Career history
- 2008–2010: Detroit / Tulsa Shock
- 2010–2011: Minnesota Lynx
- 2012–2013: Phoenix Mercury

Career highlights
- WNBA steals leader (2008); 2× WNBA champion (2008, 2011); 2× NCAA champion (2007, 2008); SEC All-Defensive Team (2008); 2× First-team All-SEC (2007, 2008); SEC All-Freshman Team (2005); McDonald's All-American Game MVP (2004)
- Stats at WNBA.com
- Stats at Basketball Reference
Medals
Women's basketball
Representing the United States
Pan American Games
Gold medal – first place	2007 Brazil	Team

Alexis Kay'ree Hornbuckle (born October 16, 1985) is an American former professional basketball player who played several seasons in the Women's National Basketball Association. She is the only player to win an NCAA title and WNBA title in the same year (2008 - with the University of Tennessee and the Detroit Shock).

== Early life ==
Born in Charleston, West Virginia, Hornbuckle attended Capital High School and later graduated from South Charleston High School Alexis was a high school teammate of Renee Montgomery (who formerly played for the Atlanta Dream). In addition to playing basketball, she also competed in her high school's female soccer team. Hornbuckle was named a WBCA All-American. She participated in the 2004 WBCA High School All-America Game, where she scored eight points, and earned MVP honors.

== College career ==
Hornbuckle played four years for the University of Tennessee's Women's basketball team, graduating in 2008 with Candace Parker, Shannon Bobbitt, and Nicky Anosike. She was a key player for two NCAA Championship teams during her tenure, earning places on the 2007 All-SEC First Team, 2007 SEC All-Tournament Team and 2005 All-SEC Freshmen Team. She currently holds the mark for most career steals by a Tennessee Women's player.

Hornbuckle played for the USA team in the 2007 Pan American Games in Rio de Janeiro, Brazil. The team won all five games, earning the gold medal for the event.

In the 2008 WNBA Draft, Hornbuckle was selected by the Detroit Shock in the first round (fourth overall).

== Professional career ==
Hornbuckle was drafted 4th overall by the Detroit Shock in 2008. In her first WNBA game, she set a franchise record with seven steals while playing just 19 minutes. She averaged 5.4 points per game during the Shock's run to the 2008 WNBA title.

Hornbuckle became a starter in 2009, and moved with the franchise to Tulsa in 2010. She was traded to the Minnesota Lynx halfway through the season, where she served as a backup to starting point guard Lindsay Whalen. She was acquired by the Phoenix Mercury on February 2, 2012, and played for them for the 2012 and 2013 seasons.

== Career statistics ==
=== WNBA ===
Legend
GP	Games played	GS	Games started	MPG	Minutes per game	RPG	Rebounds per game
APG	Assists per game	SPG	Steals per game	BPG	Blocks per game	PPG	Points per game
TO	Turnovers per game	FG%	Field-goal percentage	3P%	3-point field-goal percentage	FT%	Free-throw percentage
**Bold**	Career best	°	League leader

†	Denotes seasons in which Hornbuckle won a WNBA championship

==== Regular season ====
Year	Team	GP	GS	MPG	FG%	3P%	FT%	RPG	APG	SPG	BPG	TO	PPG
2008^{†}	Detroit	**34**	0	22.0	.354	.356	.636	4.1	2.1	**2.3**	0.3	1.4	5.4
2009	Detroit	32	21	**26.6**	**.380**	.391	.542	**4.9**	**2.7**	1.3	0.3	2.2	**6.7**
2010	Tulsa	15	10	21.1	.373	**.400**	**.833**	3.5	**2.7**	1.5	**0.7**	1.8	5.8
2010	Minnesota	13	0	14.9	.283	.167	.750	1.5	1.3	1.4	0.2	0.9	3.0
2011^{†}	Minnesota	29	0	7.2	.375	.294	.500	1.1	0.6	0.3	0.1	0.7	1.1
2012	Phoenix	**34**	**25**	25.4	.335	.325	.605	4.2	2.0	1.2	0.5	2.1	6.5
2013	Phoenix	30	1	12.4	.326	.278	.700	1.7	1.3	0.4	0.1	1.3	3.0
Career	6 years, 3 teams	187	57	19.0	.351	.330	.639	3.2	1.8	1.2	0.3	1.5	4.6

==== Playoffs ====
Year	Team	GP	GS	MPG	FG%	3P%	FT%	RPG	APG	SPG	BPG	TO	PPG
2008^{†}	Detroit	**9**	0	24.4	.429	**.375**	.750	4.9	2.1	1.2	**0.8**	1.3	6.3
2009	Detroit	5	**5**	**35.4**	.489	.333	**1.000**	**6.0**	**4.0**	**1.8**	0.6	3.2	**10.6**
2011^{†}	Minnesota	4	0	3.8	**.600**	.000	**1.000**	1.3	1.3	0.0	0.5	0.3	2.8
2013	Phoenix	4	0	10.8	.300	.000	**1.000**	2.3	1.5	1.0	0.5	1.3	2.0
Career	4 years, 3 teams	22	5	20.7	.451	.300	.848	4.0	2.3	1.1	0.6	1.5	5.9

=== College ===
Legend
GP	Games played	GS	Games started	MPG	Minutes per game
FG%	Field goal percentage	3P%	3-point field goal percentage	FT%	Free throw percentage
RPG	Rebounds per game	APG	Assists per game	SPG	Steals per game
BPG	Blocks per game	PPG	Points per game	**Bold**	Career high

Year	Team	GP	Points	FG%	3P%	FT%	RPG	APG	SPG	BPG	PPG
2004–05	Tennessee	35	301	**44.4**	33.3	60.6	5.4	3.1	1.8	0.6	8.6
2005–06	Tennessee	29	286	41.8	23.7	**74.5**	5.3	**3.9**	**3.1**	0.5	9.9
2006–07	Tennessee	**37**	**378**	44.0	34.5	73.1	5.1	**3.9**	**3.1**	0.4	**10.2**
2007–08	Tennessee	**37**	368	44.3	**42.4**	67.1	**5.5**	3.6	2.8	**0.8**	9.9
**Career**	**Tennessee**	138	1333	43.7	35.7	68.6	5.4	3.6	2.7	0.6	9.7

== Overseas career ==
She played for Besiktas in Turkey during the 2008–09 WNBA off-season, for PeKa (Finland) and Elitzur Holon (Israel) in 2009–10, for Ramat Hasharon (Israel) and Tarsus (turkey) in 2010–11, and Elitzur Holon (Israel) in the 2012–13 off-season.

== Personal life ==
Alexis is currently a Certified Personal Trainer at Alexis Hornbuckle Basketball. She is also podcast host of The Collective Unfiltered and Buck & 2MC Lady Vol Show on the Volunteer Roadshow. She has interviewed many athletes and influencers such as former Tennessee Lady Vol basketball players Chamique Holdsclaw and Brittany Jackson. She has hosted other podcasts on the Volunteer Roadshow with former University of Tennessee football star player Billy Ratliff and former University of Tennessee men's basketball and NBA star player Jarnell Stokes.

== See also ==
- 2008 WNBA draft
