= 2008 WNBA draft =

2008 meeting of WNBA teams to select players

General information
- Sport: Basketball
- Date: April 9, 2008
- Location: Tampa, Florida
- Networks: ESPN2, NBATV, ESPNU

Overview
- League: WNBA
- Expansion teams: Atlanta Dream
- First selection: Candace Parker; Los Angeles Sparks

The WNBA draft is the league's annual process for determining which Women's National Basketball Association teams receive the rights to negotiate with players entering the league. The 2008 draft was held on April 9.

A lottery was held on October 23, 2007. The Los Angeles Sparks received the first overall selection of the upcoming 2008 draft. The Chicago Sky received the number two selection. The Minnesota Lynx came up with the third overall selection, followed by the Atlanta Dream expansion franchise at four, the Houston Comets at number five, and the Washington Mystics at number six. Some of the top draftees were Candace Parker, Sylvia Fowles, Candice Wiggins, Crystal Langhorne, and Tasha Humphrey.

Top pick Candace Parker went on to become the first WNBA player to be the league's Rookie of the Year and MVP in the same season. Fourth pick Alexis Hornbuckle became the first person to win a national championship in college (with the University of Tennessee) and a WNBA title (with the Detroit Shock) in the same calendar year.

A separate expansion draft for the Atlanta Dream took place on February 6, 2008.

== Transactions ==
- The Detroit Shock held the eleventh pick in round one as part of the Katie Feenstra/Ruth Riley trade in February 2007.
- The San Antonio Silver Stars held the twenty-first pick as part of 2007 WNBA draft trade with the New York Liberty that involved Becky Hammon.
- On February 6, 2008, the Atlanta Dream traded the number four pick to the Seattle Storm along with Roneeka Hodges for the eighth pick and Iziane Castro Marques.
- On February 6, 2008, the Atlanta Dream traded the eighteenth pick and LaToya Thomas to the Detroit Shock for Ivory Latta.
- On February 19, 2008, the Seattle Storm traded the fourth pick to the Detroit Shock for Swin Cash.
- On February 19, 2008, the Connecticut Sun acquired the Indiana Fever's twelfth overall pick in a Tamika Whitmore/Katie Douglas trade.

== Key ==
!	Denotes player who has been inducted to the Naismith Basketball Hall of Fame
^	Denotes player who has been inducted to the Women's Basketball Hall of Fame
*	Denotes player who has been selected for at least one All-Star Game and All-WNBA Team
^{+}	Denotes player who has been selected for at least one All-Star Game
^{#}	Denotes player who never played in the WNBA regular season or playoffs
**Bold**	Denotes player who won Rookie of the Year

== Draft ==
=== Round 1 ===
Pick	Player	Nationality	Team	School / club team
1	**Candace Parker** *	United States	Los Angeles Sparks	Tennessee
2	Sylvia Fowles * ^ !	United States	Chicago Sky	LSU
3	Candice Wiggins	United States	Minnesota Lynx	Stanford
4	Alexis Hornbuckle	United States	Detroit Shock (from Atlanta, via Seattle) (Note: February 6, 2008: Atlanta to Seattle: Atlanta acquired Iziane Castro Marques and the 2008 No. 8 draft pick; Seattle acquired Roneeka Hodges and the 2008 No. 4 draft pick) (Note: February 19, 2008: Seattle to Detroit: Seattle acquired Swin Cash; Detroit acquired the 2008 No. 4 draft pick)	Tennessee
5	Matee Ajavon	United States	Houston Comets	Rutgers
6	Crystal Langhorne *	United States	Washington Mystics	Maryland
7	Essence Carson ^{+}	United States	New York Liberty	Rutgers
8	Tamera Young	United States	Atlanta Dream (from Seattle)	James Madison
9	Amber Holt	United States	Connecticut Sun	Middle Tennessee
10	Laura Harper	United States	Sacramento Monarchs	Maryland
11	Tasha Humphrey	United States	Detroit Shock (from San Antonio)	Georgia
12	Ketia Swanier	United States	Connecticut Sun (from Indiana)	Connecticut
13	LaToya Pringle	United States	Phoenix Mercury	North Carolina
14	Erlana Larkins	United States	New York Liberty (from Detroit)	North Carolina

=== Round 2 ===
Pick	Player	Nationality	Team	School / club team
15	Shannon Bobbitt	United States	Los Angeles Sparks	Tennessee
16	Nicky Anosike ^{+}	United States	Minnesota Lynx	Tennessee
17	Erica White	United States	Houston Comets	LSU
18	Olayinka Sanni	Nigeria	Detroit Shock (from Atlanta) (Note: February 6, 2008: Atlanta to Detroit: Atlanta acquired Ivory Latta; Seattle acquired LaToya Thomas and the 2008 No. 18 draft pick)	West Virginia
19	Quianna Chaney	United States	Chicago Sky	LSU
20	Lindsey Pluimer ^{#}	United States	Washington Mystics	UCLA
21	Chioma Nnamaka	Sweden	San Antonio Silver Stars (from New York)	Georgia Tech
22	Allie Quigley ^{+}	United States	Seattle Storm	DePaul
23	Jolene Anderson	United States	Connecticut Sun	Wisconsin
24	Morenike Atunrase	United States	Atlanta Dream (from Indiana) (Note: February 6, 2008: Indiana to Atlanta: Indiana acquired agreement from Atlanta to not select specific unprotected Fever players in the expansion draft; Atlanta acquired the 2008 No. 24 draft pick)	Texas A&M
25	Leilani Mitchell	Australia	Phoenix Mercury (from San Antonio)	Utah
26	Khadijah Whittington	United States	Indiana Fever	North Carolina State
27	Wanisha Smith	United States	New York Liberty (from Phoenix)	Duke
28	Natasha Lacy	United States	Detroit Shock	UTEP

=== Round 3 ===
Pick	Player	Nationality	Team	School / club team
29	Sharnee Zoll	United States	Los Angeles Sparks	Virginia
30	Charde Houston ^{+}	United States	Minnesota Lynx	Connecticut
31	Crystal Kelly	United States	Houston Comets	Western Kentucky
32	Danielle Hood ^{#}	United States	Atlanta Dream	Hartford
33	Angela Tisdale ^{#}	United States	Chicago Sky	Baylor
34	Krystal Vaughn	United States	Washington Mystics	VCU
35	Alberta Auguste ^{#}	United States	New York Liberty	Tennessee
36	Kimberly Beck	United States	Seattle Storm	George Washington
37	Lauren Ervin	United States	Connecticut Sun	Arkansas
38	A'Quonesia Franklin	United States	Sacramento Monarchs	Texas A&M
39	Alex Anderson ^{#}	United States	San Antonio Silver Stars	Chattanooga
40	Izabela Piekarska ^{#}	Poland	Sacramento Monarchs (from Indiana)	UTEP
41	Marscilla Packer ^{#}	United States	Phoenix Mercury	Ohio State
42	Valeriya Berezhynska	Ukraine	Detroit Shock	Rice
43	Charel Allen	United States	Sacramento Monarchs	Notre Dame

== See also ==
- List of first overall WNBA draft picks
