= Tasha Humphrey =

American basketball player (born 1985)

Personal information
- Born: December 29, 1985 (age 40) Gainesville, Georgia, U.S.
- Listed height: 6 ft 3 in (1.91 m)
- Listed weight: 190 lb (86 kg)

Career information
- High school: Gainesville (Gainesville, Georgia)
- College: Georgia (2004–2008)
- WNBA draft: 2008: 1st round, 11th overall pick
- Drafted by: Detroit Shock
- Playing career: 2008–present
- Position: Center

Career history
- 2008: Detroit Shock
- 2008–2009: Washington Mystics
- 2009: Minnesota Lynx

Career highlights
- Kodak All-American (2006); 2× Third-team All-American – AP (2006, 2007); USBWA National Co-Freshman of the Year (2005); SEC Freshman of the Year (2005); SEC All-Freshman Team (2005); 4× First-team All-SEC (2005–2008); McDonald's All-American (2004); 2× Miss Georgia Basketball (2003, 2004)
- Stats at WNBA.com
- Stats at Basketball Reference
Medals
Women's basketball
Representing United States
Pan American Games
Gold medal – first place	2007 Brazil	Team

Tasha Humphrey (born December 29, 1985) is an American professional basketball player. She played the center position for the Washington Mystics in the WNBA until being waived 6 July 2009. Her father was former Green Bay Packers player Donnie Humphrey.

== College career ==
Born in Gainesville, Georgia, Humphrey completed her career as Georgia's second all-time scorer and fourth all-time rebounder. Humphrey scored her 1,000th point in just 53 games, the second fastest in school history.

Humphrey played for the USA team in the 2007 Pan American Games in Rio de Janeiro, Brazil. The team won all five games, earning the gold medal for the event.

== Georgia statistics ==
Legend
GP	Games played	GS	Games started	MPG	Minutes per game
FG%	Field goal percentage	3P%	3-point field goal percentage	FT%	Free throw percentage
RPG	Rebounds per game	APG	Assists per game	SPG	Steals per game
BPG	Blocks per game	PPG	Points per game	**Bold**	Career high

Year	Team	GP	Points	FG%	3P%	FT%	RPG	APG	SPG	BPG	PPG
2004-05	Georgia	**33**	**628**	**56.1**	39.5	77.2	8.4	1.5	1.1	**1.1**	19.0
2005-06	Georgia	31	624	50.5	**44.8**	**83.6**	**9.1**	1.7	**1.2**	0.7	**20.1**
2006-07	Georgia	29	468	50.0	28.8	72.9	7.6	1.6	1.1	0.8	16.1
2007-08	Georgia	**33**	552	45.2	30.9	78.4	**9.1**	**2.1**	**1.2**	**1.1**	16.7
Career	Georgia	126	2272	50.5	35.0	78.4	8.6	1.7	1.1	0.9	18.0

== WNBA career ==
Humphrey was selected in the first round of the 2008 WNBA draft (11th overall) by the Detroit Shock. Halfway through her rookie season, Humphrey was traded to the Washington Mystics for veteran Taj McWilliams-Franklin. In Washington, Humphrey could take on a more prominent role than she had in Detroit.

She finished her rookie season starting 23 of the 30 games she played in. She averaged 17 minutes, 3.1 rebounds, and 8.3 points per game. One of Humphrey's strengths is her ability to stretch the defense, making her a valuable center. In her rookie season, she ranked 13th in the league in three point field goal percentage (.382, 26–68).

Her career high is 28 points.

== WNBA career statistics ==
Legend
GP	Games played	GS	Games started	MPG	Minutes per game	RPG	Rebounds per game
APG	Assists per game	SPG	Steals per game	BPG	Blocks per game	PPG	Points per game
TO	Turnovers per game	FG%	Field-goal percentage	3P%	3-point field-goal percentage	FT%	Free-throw percentage
**Bold**	Career best	°	League leader

=== Regular season ===
Year	Team	GP	GS	MPG	FG%	3P%	FT%	RPG	APG	SPG	BPG	TO	PPG
2008	Detroit	**22**	**16**	13.5	**.500**	**.385**	**.955**	2.9	1.0	**0.6**	**0.3**	1.1	7.3
2008	Washington	8	7	**26.5**	.415	.379	.588	**6.1**	**1.1**	0.5	**0.3**	2.6	**11.1**
2009	Washington	9	0	7.4	.250	.250	.600	1.4	0.3	0.1	**0.3**	0.7	2.2
2009	Minnesota	19	4	17.9	.399	.322	.808	3.1	0.4	**0.6**	**0.3**	0.7	7.9
Career	2 years, 3 teams	58	27	15.8	.425	.345	.786	3.2	0.7	0.5	0.3	1.1	7.2
