= 2008 WNBA season =

- League: Women's National Basketball Association
- Sport: Basketball
- Duration: May 17 – October 5, 2008
- Games: 34
- Teams: 14
- Total attendance: 1,887,706
- Average attendance: 7,932
- TV partner(s): ABC, ESPN, NBA TV

Draft
- Top draft pick: (United States) Candace Parker
- Picked by: Los Angeles Sparks

Regular season
- Top seed: San Antonio Silver Stars
- Season MVP: (United States) Candace Parker (Los Angeles)
- Top scorer: (Argentina) / (United States) Diana Taurasi (Phoenix)

Playoffs
- Finals champions: Detroit Shock
- Runners-up: San Antonio Silver Stars
- Finals MVP: (United States) Katie Smith (Detroit)

WNBA seasons
- ← 2007 2009 →

The 2008 WNBA season was the 12th season of the Women's National Basketball Association. It was the first WNBA season with a franchise in Atlanta as the Dream were announced in late 2007.

No WNBA All-Star Game was held due to the 2008 Summer Olympics in Beijing, China. The regular season began with a televised (ABC) meeting between the defending champion Phoenix Mercury and the Los Angeles Sparks in Phoenix, Arizona, on May 17.

== 2007–2008 off-season ==
- On September 27, 2007, Phoenix Mercury coach Paul Westhead resigned and took a job as an assistant coach under P. J. Carlesimo for the Seattle SuperSonics. Assistant coach Corey Gaines was named the team's new head coach on November 7.
- On October 2, 2007, the Washington Mystics announced that Tree Rollins would be named the permanent head coach. Rollins had been the interim head coach since the resignation of Richie Adubato on June 1.
- On October 18, 2007, the WNBA announced the league awarded an expansion franchise to the city of Atlanta, Georgia, bringing the league to fourteen teams to start the 2008 season. The team hired Marynell Meadors as their head coach and general manager on November 27. The team name, the Atlanta Dream, was unveiled on January 23, 2008, with the expansion draft held on February 6.
- On October 26, 2007, The Indiana Fever declined to pick up the option for head coach Brian Winters. Lin Dunn was named the team's new coach on December 12.
- On November 30, 2007, the Seattle Storm announced the resignation of head coach Anne Donovan. Her replacement, Brian Agler, was named on January 9, 2008.

=== Atlanta Dream expansion draft ===
Atlanta held their expansion draft on February 6, 2008, when they selected one player from each of the thirteen teams in the league.

Some of the players chosen were:

- Érika de Souza
- Ann Wauters
- Betty Lennox

The Dream were then free to make trades with other teams in the league.

=== Draft ===
On October 23, 2007, the WNBA draft lottery was held. The Los Angeles Sparks received the first pick. The Chicago Sky was awarded the number two pick, followed by the Minnesota Lynx at number three, the Atlanta Dream at number four, the Houston Comets at number five and the Washington Mystics at number six.

The 2008 WNBA draft was held on April 9 in Tampa, Florida. Coverage of the first round was shown on ESPN2. Second and third round coverage was shown on NBA TV.

The top draft picks were as follows:

1. Candace Parker, Los Angeles Sparks
2. Sylvia Fowles, Chicago Sky
3. Candice Wiggins, Minnesota Lynx
4. Alexis Hornbuckle, Detroit Shock
5. Matee Ajavon, Houston Comets
6. Crystal Langhorne, Washington Mystics

== Season summary ==
=== Season highlights ===
- Candace Parker becomes the second player in WNBA history to dunk in a regular season game, doing so twice.
- A fight breaks out between the Los Angeles Sparks and the Detroit Shock resulting in four ejections and ten suspensions.
- The first-ever outdoor professional basketball game is held at Arthur Ashe Stadium between the New York Liberty and the Indiana Fever. Over 19,000 fans attended the game.
- 50-year-old hall-of-famer Nancy Lieberman signs a contract with the Detroit Shock to play in one game. She played 9 minutes and had 2 assists.
- The expansion Atlanta Dream set a record for the longest losing streak in WNBA history with 17 losses to give them an 0–17 start to the season.
- One of the original franchises, the Houston Comets, is put up for sale with an uncertain future.
- For the first time in WNBA history, the defending champion (Phoenix Mercury) does not qualify for the playoffs.
- Former Washington Mystics head coach Tree Rollins is relieved of his duties halfway through the season. Assistant coach Jessie Kenlaw is named interim head coach for the remainder of the season.
- The Detroit Shock sweep the San Antonio Silver Stars three-games-to-none in the Finals for the first time (in a best-of-five format).
- Candace Parker wins the WNBA Rookie of the Year Award and the MVP Award. This is the first time in WNBA history and the third time in professional basketball history for the two awards to be won in the same year by the same player.

=== End-of-season business report ===
- Regular-season attendance saw an increase of 2.21%.
- There were 46 sellouts, more than triple the 17 for the 2007 regular season and double the previous record of 23 in 2004.
- The WNBA on national television (ABC and ESPN2) finished up 19% both in ratings (0.32 vs 0.27) and viewership (413,000 vs. 346,000).
- The WNBA finished up in key demographics on ESPN2—Women 18–34 (up 71%) and Men 18–34 (up 28%) – and on ABC—All Women (up 10%) and Women 18–34 (up 20%).
- WNBA.com set all-time highs in visits and page views. Overall, WNBA.com received nearly 13 million visits and 59 million page views, up 35% and 20%, respectively.
- WNBA.com set monthly traffic records in July with more than 3.8 million visits and 16 million page views.
- On June 23, 2008, one day after Los Angeles Sparks rookie Candace Parker became the second WNBA player to dunk in a regular season game, WNBA.com set a single-day record with nearly 95,000 video streams.
- League merchandise sales were up more than 36%, and WNBA jersey sales were up more than 46%.

== Regular season ==
=== Standings ===
Eastern Conference	W	L	PCT	GB	Home	Road	Conf.
Detroit Shock ^{x}	22	12	.647	–	14–3	8–9	16–4
Connecticut Sun ^{x}	21	13	.618	1.0	13–4	8–9	13–7
New York Liberty ^{x}	19	15	.559	3.0	11–6	8–9	11–9
Indiana Fever ^{x}	17	17	.500	5.0	11–6	6–11	12–8
Chicago Sky ^{o}	12	22	.353	10.0	8–9	4–13	10–10
Washington Mystics ^{o}	10	24	.294	12.0	6–11	4–13	6–14
Atlanta Dream ^{o}	4	30	.118	18.0	1–16	3–14	2–18

Western Conference	W	L	PCT	GB	Home	Road	Conf.
San Antonio Silver Stars ^{x}	24	10	.706	–	15–2	9–8	10–10
Seattle Storm ^{x}	22	12	.647	2.0	16–1	6–11	13–7
Los Angeles Sparks ^{x}	20	14	.588	4.0	12–5	8–9	12–8
Sacramento Monarchs ^{x}	18	16	.529	6.0	5–12	13–4	9–11
Houston Comets ^{o}	17	17	.500	7.0	13–4	4–13	10–10
Minnesota Lynx ^{o}	16	18	.471	8.0	10–7	6–11	8–12
Phoenix Mercury ^{o}	16	18	.471	8.0	9–8	7–10	8–12

Note: Teams with an "X" clinched playoff spots.

=== All-star game ===
There was no WNBA All-Star Game due to the break July 28 through August 27 for the 2008 Beijing Olympics. This marks the first time since the game was started in the 1999 season that there was no All-Star contest.

=== Statistic leaders ===
Category	Player	Team	Statistic
Points per game	Diana Taurasi	Phoenix Mercury	24.1
Rebounds per game	Candace Parker	Los Angeles Sparks	9.5
Assists per game	Lindsay Whalen	Connecticut Sun	5.4
Steals per game	Alexis Hornbuckle	Detroit Shock	2.3
Blocks per game	Lisa Leslie	Los Angeles Sparks	2.9
Field goal percentage	Sancho Lyttle	Houston Comets	.582
Three-point FG percentage	Edwige Lawson-Wade; Lisa Willis	San Antonio Silver Stars; New York Liberty	.468
Free throw percentage	Becky Hammon	San Antonio Silver Stars	.937
Points per game	Team stat	Phoenix Mercury	88.53
Fewest points allowed	Team stat	Seattle Storm	70.77
Field goal percentage	Team stat	San Antonio Silver Stars	.433

== Playoffs ==
This was the outlook for the 2008 WNBA playoffs. Teams in italics had home court advantage. Teams in bold advanced to the next round. Numbers to the left of each team indicate the team's original playoffs seeding in their respective conferences. Numbers to the right of each team indicate the number of games the team won in that round.

This was the outlook for the 2008 WNBA playoffs. Teams in italics had home court advantage. Teams in bold advanced to the next round. Numbers to the left of each team indicate the team's original playoffs seeding in their respective conferences. Numbers to the right of each team indicate the number of games the team won in that round.

**Conference semifinals**
E1	**Detroit**	2
E4	Indiana	1
**Eastern Conference**
E2	Connecticut	1
E3	**New York**	2
W1	**San Antonio**	2
W4	Sacramento	1
**Western Conference**
W2	Seattle	1
W3	**Los Angeles**	2

**Conference finals**
E1	**Detroit**	2
E3	New York	1
W1	**San Antonio**	2
W3	Los Angeles	1

**WNBA Finals**
E1	**Detroit**	3
W1	San Antonio	0

- **Bold** – Series winner
- Italic – Team with home-court advantage

== Awards ==
=== Individual ===
Award		Winner	Team	Position	Votes
Most Valuable Player (MVP)		Candace Parker	Los Angeles Sparks	Forward	276.79 out of 300 pts (Note: First place vote counts were not released by the WNBA. For the first time, an online fan vote was included in post-season award voting, accounting for 25% of the vote. The other 75% was from a panel of 45 national sportswriters and broadcasters.)
Finals MVP		Katie Smith	Detroit Shock	Forward	
Defensive Player of the Year		Lisa Leslie	Los Angeles Sparks	Center	20 / 43
Most Improved Player		Ebony Hoffman	Indiana Fever	Forward	31 / 44
Peak Performers	Scoring	Diana Taurasi	Phoenix Mercury	Forward	24.1 PPG
Peak Performers	Rebounding	Candace Parker	Los Angeles Sparks	Forward	9.5 RPG
Peak Performers	Assists	Lindsay Whalen	Connecticut Sun	Guard	5.4 APG
Sixth Woman of the Year		Candice Wiggins	Minnesota Lynx	Guard	27 / 42
Rookie of the Year		Candace Parker	Los Angeles Sparks	Forward	Unanimous
Kim Perrot Sportsmanship Award		Vickie Johnson	San Antonio Silver Stars	Guard	14 / 39
Coach of the Year		Mike Thibault	Connecticut Sun	Coach	24 / 45

=== Team ===
Award		Guard	Guard	Forward	Forward	Center
All-WNBA	First Team	Lindsay Whalen	Diana Taurasi	Sophia Young	Candace Parker	Lisa Leslie
All-WNBA	Second Team	Sue Bird	Becky Hammon	Deanna Nolan	Asjha Jones	Lauren Jackson
All-Defensive	First Team	Tully Bevilaqua	Ticha Penicheiro	Tamika Catchings	Sophia Young	Lisa Leslie
All-Defensive	Second Team	Deanna Nolan	Katie Smith	Rebekkah Brunson	Lauren Jackson	Sylvia Fowles
All-Rookie Team		Candice Wiggins	Matee Ajavon	Amber Holt	Candace Parker	Nicky Anosike; Sylvia Fowles

=== Players of the Week ===
Week ending	Eastern Conference		Western Conference	
Week ending	Player	Team	Player	Team
May 25	Lindsay Whalen	Connecticut Sun	Sophia Young	San Antonio Silver Stars
June 1	Katie Douglas	Indiana Fever	Seimone Augustus	Minnesota Lynx
June 8	Katie Smith	Detroit Shock	Diana Taurasi	Phoenix Mercury
June 15	Janel McCarville	New York Liberty	Lisa Leslie	Los Angeles Sparks
June 22	Deanna Nolan	Detroit Shock	Diana Taurasi (2)	Phoenix Mercury
June 29	Asjha Jones	Connecticut Sun	Diana Taurasi (3)	Phoenix Mercury
July 6	Shameka Christon	New York Liberty	Lauren Jackson	Seattle Storm
July 13	Lindsay Whalen (2)	Connecticut Sun	Becky Hammon	San Antonio Silver Stars
July 20	Deanna Nolan (2)	Detroit Shock	Cappie Pondexter	Phoenix Mercury
July 27	Asjha Jones (2)	Connecticut Sun	Tina Thompson	Houston Comets
August 31	Jia Perkins	Chicago Sky	Candace Parker	Los Angeles Sparks
September 7	Janel McCarville (2)	New York Liberty	Diana Taurasi (4)	Phoenix Mercury
September 14	Tammy Sutton-Brown	Indiana Fever	Ann Wauters	San Antonio Silver Stars

== Coaches ==
=== Eastern Conference ===
- Atlanta Dream: Marynell Meadors
- Chicago Sky: Steven Key
- Connecticut Sun: Mike Thibault
- Detroit Shock: Bill Laimbeer
- Indiana Fever: Lin Dunn
- New York Liberty: Pat Coyle
- Washington Mystics: Tree Rollins and Jessie Kenlaw

=== Western Conference ===
- Houston Comets: Karleen Thompson
- Los Angeles Sparks: Michael Cooper
- Minnesota Lynx: Don Zierden
- Phoenix Mercury: Corey Gaines
- Sacramento Monarchs: Jenny Boucek
- San Antonio Silver Stars: Dan Hughes
- Seattle Storm: Brian Agler

== See also ==
- WNBA
- WNBA draft
- WNBA All-Star Game
- WNBA playoffs
- WNBA Finals
