= 2011 Indiana Fever season =

Basketball season

- Head coach: Lin Dunn
- Arena: Conseco Fieldhouse

Results
- Record: 21–13 (.618)
- Place: 1st (Eastern)
- Playoff finish: Lost in Conference Finals

Media
- Television: FS-I; ESPN2, NBATV
- Radio: WFNI

The 2011 WNBA season was the 12th season for the Indiana Fever of the Women's National Basketball Association.

== Transactions ==
=== WNBA draft ===
The following are the Fever's selections in the 2011 WNBA draft.

Round	Pick	Player	Nationality	School/team/country
1	9	Jeanette Pohlen	United States	Stanford
3	33	Jori Davis	United States	Oklahoma State

=== Transaction log ===
- February 2: The Fever signed Tangela Smith.
- February 4: The Fever re-signed Jessica Davenport and signed Shyra Ely to a training camp contract.
- February 8: The Fever re-signed Joy Cheek.
- February 14: The Fever signed Shannon Bobbitt to a training camp contract.
- March 11: The Fever signed Aisha Mohammed and Abi Olajuwon to training camp contracts.
- April 29: The Fever traded their second- and third-round picks in the 2012 Draft to the Seattle Storm and Washington Mystics, respectively, in exchange for Erin Phillips and a third-round pick in the 2012 Draft from Seattle.
- May 1: The Fever waived Jori Davis.
- May 5: The Fever waived Joy Cheek.
- May 19: The Fever waived Aisha Mohammed.
- May 30: The Fever waived Abi Olajuwon and Jene Morris.
- June 1: The Fever waived Jessica Moore.

=== Trades ===
Date	Trade	
April 29, 2011	To Indiana Fever	To Seattle and Washington
April 29, 2011	Erin Phillips and Seattle's third-round pick in 2012 Draft	second- and third-round picks in 2012 Draft

=== Personnel changes ===
==== Additions ====
Player	Signed	Former team
Tangela Smith	February 2, 2011	Phoenix Mercury
Shyra Ely	February 4, 2011	free agent
Shannon Bobbitt	February 14, 2011	free agent
Jeanette Pohlen	April 11, 2011	draft pick
Erin Phillips	April 29, 2011	Seattle Storm

==== Subtractions ====
Player	Left	New team
Ebony Hoffman	February 2, 2011	Los Angeles Sparks
Tully Bevilaqua	March 7, 2011	San Antonio Silver Stars
Joy Cheek	May 5, 2011	free agent
Jene Morris	May 30, 2011	free agent
Jessica Moore	June 1, 2011	free agent

== Roster ==
2011 Indiana Fever roster
Players
Coaches

Pos.	No.	Nat.	Name	Height	Weight	DOB	From	Yrs
G	0	(United States)	Bobbitt, Shannon	5' 2" (1.57m)	130 lb (59kg)	1985-12-06	Tennessee	2
F	24	(United States)	Catchings, Tamika	6' 1" (1.85m)	167 lb (76kg)	1979-07-21	Tennessee	9
C	50	(United States)	Davenport, Jessica	6' 5" (1.96m)	215 lb (98kg)	1985-06-21	Ohio State	4
G/F	23	(United States)	Douglas, Katie	6' 0" (1.83m)	165 lb (75kg)	1979-05-07	Purdue	10
F	43	(United States)	Ely, Shyra	6' 2" (1.88m)	182 lb (83kg)	1983-08-09	Tennessee	5
G	20	(United States)	January, Briann (injured)	5' 8" (1.73m)	144 lb (65kg)	1987-01-11	Arizona State	2
G	13	(Australia)	Phillips, Erin	5' 8" (1.73m)	165 lb (75kg)	1985-05-19	Australia	3
G	32	(United States)	Pohlen, Jeanette	6' 0" (1.83m)	179 lb (81kg)	1989-05-02	Stanford	R
F/C	5	(United States)	Smith, Tangela	6' 3" (1.91m)	158 lb (72kg)	1977-04-01	Iowa	13
C	8	(Canada)	Sutton-Brown, Tammy	6' 4" (1.93m)	199 lb (90kg)	1978-01-27	Rutgers	10
G	1	(United States)	Zellous, Shavonte	5' 10" (1.78m)	155 lb (70kg)	1986-08-28	Pittsburgh	2

Head coach
(United States) Lin Dunn (UT Martin)
Assistant coaches
(United States) Gary Kloppenburg (UC San Diego)
(United States) Stephanie White (Purdue)
Athletic trainer
(United States) Brandon Johnson (Purdue)
Strength and conditioning coach
(United States) Craig Stull (Indianapolis)

Legend

- (C) Team captain
- (DP) Unsigned draft pick
- (FA) Free agent
- (S) Suspended
- Injured

=== Depth ===
Pos.	Starter	Bench
C	Tammy Sutton-Brown	Jessica Davenport
PF	Tangela Smith	Shyra Ely
SF	Tamika Catchings	Shavonte Zellous
SG	Katie Douglas	Jeanette Pohlen
PG	Erin Phillips	Shannon Bobbitt; Briann January

== Season standings ==
Eastern Conference	W	L	PCT	GB	Home	Road	Conf.
Indiana Fever ^{x}	21	13	.618	–	13–4	8–9	13–9
Connecticut Sun ^{x}	21	13	.618	–	15–2	6–11	14–8
Atlanta Dream ^{x}	20	14	.588	1.0	11–6	9–8	14–8
New York Liberty ^{x}	19	15	.559	2.0	12-5	7–10	11–11
Chicago Sky ^{o}	14	20	.412	7.0	10–7	4–13	10–12
Washington Mystics ^{o}	6	28	.176	15.0	4–13	2–15	4–18

== Schedule ==
=== Preseason ===
2011 Game Log: Preseason

Game	Date	Time (ET)	Opponent	Score	High points	High rebounds	High assists	Location/Attendance	Record
1	May 24	1:00pm	@ Minnesota	66–71	Douglas (11)	Catchings (8)	January (7)	Concordia University; 2,055	0–1
2	May 31	7:00pm	Minnesota	70–76	Douglas (15)	Catchings, Douglas (5)	3 players (2)	Conseco Fieldhouse; 3,817	0–2

=== Regular season ===
2011 Game Log: Regular Season
June

Game	Date	Time (ET)	Opponent	TV	Score	High points	High rebounds	High assists	Location/Attendance	Record
1	June 4	7:00pm	Chicago	FS-I; CN100	65–57	Douglas (19)	Catchings (9)	January (4)	Conseco Fieldhouse; 8,024	1–0
2	June 10	7:00pm	New York		80–81	Douglas (27)	Catchings; Davenport; Smith (6)	Catchings; Phillips (3)	Conseco Fieldhouse; 7,703	1–1
3	June 11	7:00pm	@ New York	MSG	86–80	Catchings (19)	Davenport (8)	Catchings; Douglas; Phillips (4)	Prudential Center; 7,835	2–1
4	June 14	7:00pm	Tulsa	ESPN2	82–74	Douglas (22)	Catchings; Davenport; Douglas (7)	January (10)	Conseco Fieldhouse; 6,024	3–1
5	June 17	10:00pm	@ Seattle		54–68	Douglas (11)	Catchings (14)	January (3)	KeyArena; 8,178	3–2
6	June 19	6:00pm	@ Phoenix		89–93 (OT)	Davenport (20)	Catchings (15)	Bobbitt; January (6)	US Airways Center; 7,701	3–3
7	June 21	7:00pm	@ Washington	CSN-MA	89–80	Zellous (21)	Catchings; Davenport (6)	January (9)	Verizon Center; 7,980	4–3
8	June 25	7:00pm	Connecticut	NBATV; CSN-NE	75–70	Catchings (13)	Catchings (12)	Catchings (5)	Conseco Fieldhouse; 7,100	5–3
9	June 26	7:00pm	@ Minnesota	NBATV; FS-N	78–75	Douglas (22)	Douglas (8)	January (4)	Target Center; 7,117	6–3
10	June 28	7:00pm	Phoenix		91–86	Douglas (26)	Sutton-Brown (6)	Catchings (7)	Conseco Fieldhouse; 6,625	7–3

July

Game	Date	Time (ET)	Opponent	TV	Score	High points	High rebounds	High assists	Location/Attendance	Record
11	July 5	7:00pm	Seattle	FS-I	78–61	Davenport (15)	Davenport (7)	Phillips (6)	Conseco Fieldhouse; 6,525	8–3
12	July 9	7:00pm	Washington		68–57	Phillips (14)	Catchings (7)	Catchings (4)	Conseco Fieldhouse; 7,056	9–3
13	July 13	1:00pm	Connecticut		90–78	Douglas (20)	Catchings; Phillips (5)	Catchings (7)	Conseco Fieldhouse; 9,045	10–3
14	July 15	7:00pm	Minnesota		70–80	Catchings (22)	Catchings; Davenport (5)	Zellous (4)	Conseco Fieldhouse; 7,538	10–4
15	July 17	5:00pm	@ Connecticut		71–76	Catchings (18)	Catchings (15)	Phillips; Pohlen; Smith (4)	Mohegan Sun Arena; 7,075	10–5
16	July 19	12:00pm	@ Atlanta	NBATV; SSO	74–84	Catchings (22)	Catchings (8)	Catchings (6)	Philips Arena; 7,645	10–6
17	July 21	7:00pm	Chicago	NBATV; FS-I; CN100	77–63	Davenport (20)	Catchings; Davenport; Douglas (7)	Douglas (7)	Conseco Fieldhouse; 8,050	11–6
All-Star break
18	July 28	7:30pm	@ Connecticut		69–58	Catchings (16)	Davenport (10)	Bobbitt (5)	Mohegan Sun Arena; 6,329	12–6
19	July 29	7:00pm	@ Washington	NBATV; CSN-MA	61–59	Catchings (16)	Catchings (9)	Catchings (5)	Verizon Center; 11,587	13–6
20	July 31	6:00pm	Los Angeles		98–63	Davenport (16)	Catchings (11)	Catchings (6)	Conseco Fieldhouse; 9,256	14–6

August

Game	Date	Time (ET)	Opponent	TV	Score	High points	High rebounds	High assists	Location/Attendance	Record
21	August 5	8:00pm	@ Tulsa		85–65	Davenport (17)	Zellous (5)	Phillips (4)	BOK Center; 5,013	15–6
22	August 7	6:00pm	@ Chicago	CN100	69–88	Douglas (14)	Phillips (8)	Catchings (5)	Allstate Arena; 5,794	15–7
23	August 9	7:00pm	San Antonio		81–68	Catchings (21)	Davenport (8)	Catchings; Douglas (3)	Conseco Fieldhouse; 7,520	16–7
24	August 13	7:00pm	New York	NBATV	82–71	Catchings (32)	Phillips (6)	Phillips (4)	Conseco Fieldhouse; 9,237	17–7
25	August 16	8:00pm	@ San Antonio		65–63	Catchings (26)	Bobbitt (6)	Catchings; Pohlen; Zellous (2)	AT&T Center; 6,358	18–7
26	August 18	10:30pm	@ Los Angeles		70–75	Catchings; Phillips (16)	Smith (9)	Phillips; Smith (5)	Staples Center; 8,102	18–8
27	August 21	6:00pm	Washington	NBATV; FS-I	83–51	Douglas (15)	Catchings (8)	Catchings (5)	Conseco Fieldhouse; 7,935	19–8
28	August 27	7:00pm	Atlanta	NBATV; FS-I; SSO	80–86	Catchings (22)	Sutton-Brown (6)	Douglas (5)	Conseco Fieldhouse; 9,242	19–9
29	August 30	7:30pm	@ Atlanta	SSO	90–92	Phillips (21)	Catchings (7)	Douglas (4)	Philips Arena; 6,467	19–10

September

Game	Date	Time (ET)	Opponent	TV	Score	High points	High rebounds	High assists	Location/Attendance	Record
30	September 2	7:30pm	@ Connecticut		55–83	Douglas (12)	Catchings (8)	Catchings (5)	Mohegan Sun Arena; 6,991	19–11
31	September 4	6:00pm	@ Chicago	NBATV; CN100	88–80	Catchings; Douglas (17)	Catchings (7)	Catchings (6)	Allstate Arena; 6,199	20–11
32	September 7	7:00pm	Washington	NBATV	87–69	Douglas (21)	Catchings (10)	Douglas (5)	Conseco Fieldhouse; 8,514	21–11
33	September 9	7:00pm	@ New York	NBATV; MSG+	75–83	Douglas (17)	Catchings (6)	Bobbitt (7)	Prudential Center; 8,015	21–12
34	September 11	5:00pm	Atlanta	NBATV; FS-I; SSO	88–93	Douglas (30)	Davenport (9)	Bobbitt (6)	Conseco Fieldhouse; 11,521	21–13

All games are viewable on WNBA LiveAccess or ESPN3.com

=== Postseason ===
2011 Game Log: Postseason
Eastern Conference Semifinals

Game	Date	Time (ET)	Opponent	TV	Score	High points	High rebounds	High assists	Location/Attendance	Series
1	September 15	8:00pm	New York	ESPN2	74–72	Douglas (25)	Sutton-Brown (7)	Bobbitt; Phillips (3)	Conseco Fieldhouse; 7,608	1–0
2	September 17	4:00pm	@ New York	NBATV; MSG	72–87	Douglas (20)	Catchings (9)	Bobbitt; Phillips (4)	Prudential Center; 8,508	1–1
3	September 19	8:00pm	New York	ESPN2	72–62	Douglas (21)	Catchings (8)	Catchings (4)	Conseco Fieldhouse; 7,368	2–1

Eastern Conference Finals

Game	Date	Time (ET)	Opponent	TV	Score	High points	High rebounds	High assists	Location/Attendance	Series
1	September 22	7:00pm	Atlanta	ESPN2	82–74	Smith (25)	Catchings (13)	Catchings; Douglas; Zellous (3)	Conseco Fieldhouse; 8,253	1–0
2	September 25	3:00pm	@ Atlanta	ESPN2	77–94	Douglas (25)	Catchings (9)	Douglas (6)	Philips Arena; 8,052	1–1
3	September 27	8:00pm	Atlanta	ESPN2	67–83	Douglas (16)	Douglas; Sutton-Brown (9)	Catchings; Phillips (3)	Conseco Fieldhouse; 9,036	1–2

== Statistics ==
Legend
GP	Games played	GS	Games started	MPG	Minutes per game	RPG	Rebounds per game
APG	Assists per game	SPG	Steals per game	BPG	Blocks per game	PPG	Points per game
FG%	Field-goal percentage	3P%	3-point field-goal percentage	FT%	Free-throw percentage	TO	Turnovers per game
PF	Fouls per game		Team leader		League leader

=== Regular season ===
Player	GP	GS	MPG	FG%	3P%	FT%	RPG	APG	SPG	BPG	PPG
Shannon Bobbitt	31	3	14.2	.357	.386	.767	1.3	1.7	0.97	0.00	3.9
Tamika Catchings	33	33	31.5	.438	.348	.883	7.1	3.5	2.03	0.91	15.5
Jessica Davenport	34	8	21.1	.529	.000	.702	4.8	0.5	0.79	1.32	10.7
Katie Douglas	32	32	29.4	.465	.440	.671	3.9	2.8	1.28	0.25	13.9
Shyra Ely	33	0	10.8	.358	.208	.690	2.2	0.3	0.18	0.18	3.1
Briann January	10	10	28.6	.357	.318	.829	1.4	5.0	1.50	0.00	8.6
Erin Phillips	31	22	22.2	.462	.426	.833	2.8	2.4	0.97	0.00	8.6
Jeanette Pohlen	34	2	15.9	.471	.468	.867	1.4	1.0	0.38	0.12	4.1
Tangela Smith	33	32	21.5	.371	.340	.882	3.1	1.5	0.67	0.48	7.2
Tammy Sutton-Brown	34	26	19.0	.489	.000	.743	3.1	0.6	1.06	1.21	5.5
Shavonte Zellous	33	2	14.0	.438	.265	.784	2.4	1.4	0.36	0.45	5.5

=== Postseason ===
Player	GP	GS	MPG	FG%	3P%	FT%	RPG	APG	SPG	BPG	PPG
Shannon Bobbitt											
Tamika Catchings											
Jessica Davenport											
Katie Douglas											
Shyra Ely											
Briann January	0	0	0.0	.000	.000	.000	0.0	0.0	0.00	0.00	0.0
Erin Phillips											
Jeanette Pohlen											
Tangela Smith											
Tammy Sutton-Brown											
Shavonte Zellous											

== Awards and honors ==
- Katie Douglas was named WNBA Eastern Conference Player of the Week for the week of June 3, 2011.
- Tamika Catchings was named to the 2011 WNBA All-Star Team as a starter.
- Katie Douglas was named to the 2011 WNBA All-Star Team as a starter.
- Tamika Catchings was named to the All-Defensive First Team.
- Katie Douglas was named to the All-Defensive Second Team.
- Tamika Catchings was named to the All-WNBA First Team.
- Tamika Catchings was named Most Valuable Player.
