= Shyra Ely =

American basketball player (born 1983)

Personal information
- Born: August 9, 1983 (age 43) Indianapolis, Indiana, U.S.
- Listed height: 6 ft 2 in (1.88 m)
- Listed weight: 182 lb (83 kg)

Career information
- High school: Ben Davis (Indianapolis, Indiana)
- College: Tennessee (2001–2005)
- WNBA draft: 2005: 2nd round, 14th overall pick
- Drafted by: San Antonio Silver Stars
- Position: Forward

Career history
- 2005–2006: San Antonio Silver Stars
- 2007–2008: Seattle Storm
- 2009: Chicago Sky
- 2011: Indiana Fever

Career highlights
- SEC Tournament MVP (2005); Third-team All-American – AP (2004); Kodak All-American (2004); All-American – USBWA (2004); 2× First-team All-SEC (2004, 2005); SEC All-Freshman Team (2002); Naismith Prep Player of the Year (2001); Gatorade National Player of the Year (2001); Indiana Miss Basketball (2001)
- Stats at WNBA.com
- Stats at Basketball Reference

Shyra Quontae Ely (born August 9, 1983) is an American basketball player who last played in the Women's National Basketball Association (WNBA) for the Indiana Fever. The 6–2 power forward had originally played for two seasons with the San Antonio Silver Stars. She was selected with the 14th overall pick in the 2005 WNBA draft in the second round, out of Tennessee.

== High school career ==
Ely played for Ben Davis High School in Indianapolis, Indiana, where she was named a WBCA All-American. She was also recognized as the 2001 Indiana Miss Basketball award winner. She participated in the 2001 WBCA High School All-America Game where she scored two points.

== Professional career ==
Through three seasons in the league, she has scored 245 points, and has collected 132 rebounds, 48 assists, 17 steals, and 5 blocks. She scored a career high 15 points, in the 2005 season, against the Phoenix Mercury.

During preseason practice with the Indiana Fever in May 2013, Ely-Gash ruptured her right Achilles tendon and was later waived from the Fever roster.

== Career statistics ==
Legend
GP	Games played	GS	Games started	MPG	Minutes per game	RPG	Rebounds per game
APG	Assists per game	SPG	Steals per game	BPG	Blocks per game	PPG	Points per game
TO	Turnovers per game	FG%	Field-goal percentage	3P%	3-point field-goal percentage	FT%	Free-throw percentage
**Bold**	Career best	°	League leader

=== WNBA ===
==== Regular season ====
WNBA regular season statistics
Year	Team	GP	GS	MPG	FG%	3P%	FT%	RPG	APG	SPG	BPG	TO	PPG
2005	San Antonio	31	**11**	**17.0**	37.9	29.0	76.9	2.0	**0.9**	0.2	0.1	1.1	4.5
2006	San Antonio	12	1	11.3	27.3	22.2	57.7	2.6	0.8	0.2	0.0	1.1	3.4
2007	Seattle	29	0	9.7	32.3	33.3	64.5	1.3	0.4	0.3	0.0	**0.7**	2.2
2008	Seattle	**34**	1	11.4	40.9	36.4	62.5	2.6	0.5	**0.4**	0.1	0.9	3.3
2009	Chicago	**34**	9	14.6	**41.8**	**38.3**	**80.4**	2.6	0.6	**0.4**	**0.2**	1.1	**6.8**
2010	Did not play (waived)												
2011	Indiana	33	0	10.8	35.8	20.8	69.0	2.2	0.3	0.2	**0.2**	0.8	3.1
**Career**	6 years, 4 teams	173	22	12.6	38.0	32.0	70.5	2.2	0.5	0.3	0.1	0.9	4.0

==== Playoffs ====
WNBA playoff statistics
Year	Team	GP	GS	MPG	FG%	3P%	FT%	RPG	APG	SPG	BPG	TO	PPG
2008	Seattle	2	0	1.0	—	—	—	0.0	0.0	0.0	0.0	0.0	0.0
2011	Indiana	**3**	0	**4.3**	**42.9**	**100.0**	—	**0.3**	**0.3**	**0.7**	0.0	0.3	**2.3**
**Career**	2 years, 2 teams	5	0	3.0	42.9	100.0	—	0.2	0.2	0.4	0.0	0.2	1.4

=== College ===
NCAA statistics
Year	Team	GP	Points	FG%	3P%	FT%	RPG	APG	SPG	BPG	PPG
2001–02	Tennessee	33	308	49.0	—	58.5	5.4	1.1	0.8	**0.4**	9.3
2002–03	Tennessee	**36**	354	**49.5**	**37.5**	71.3	6.6	1.3	1.2	0.3	9.8
2003–04	Tennessee	35	**508**	48.1	—	67.8	**8.0**	1.5	1.3	**0.4**	**14.5**
2004–05	Tennessee	35	503	45.6	29.4	**72.3**	7.0	**1.7**	**1.5**	0.3	14.4
**Career**		139	1673	47.8	29.6	67.9	6.8	1.4	1.2	0.3	12.0

== Personal life ==
Her brother Shyron Ely is also a professional basketball player who played for the MLP Academics Heidelberg for most of his career.
