= Noelle Quinn =

American basketball player/coach (born 1985)

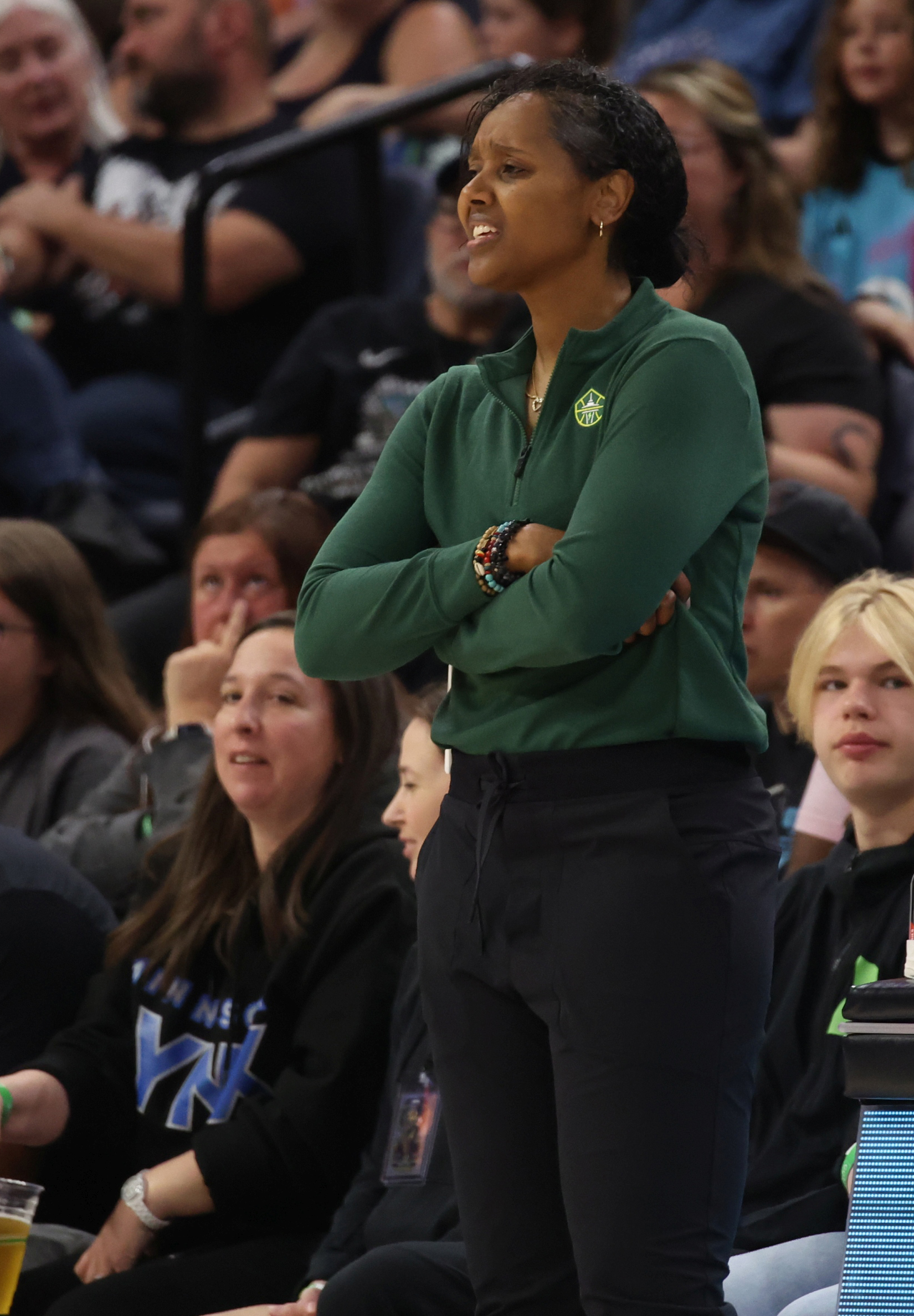
- Quinn coaching the Seattle Storm in 2023

UCLA Bruins
- Title: Assistant Coach
- League: Big 10

Personal information
- Born: January 3, 1985 (age 41) Los Angeles, California, U.S.
- Listed height: 6 ft 0 in (1.83 m)
- Listed weight: 178 lb (81 kg)

Career information
- High school: Bishop Montgomery (Torrance, California)
- College: UCLA (2003–2007)
- WNBA draft: 2007: 1st round, 4th overall pick
- Drafted by: Minnesota Lynx
- Playing career: 2007–2018
- Position: Point guard / shooting guard
- Number: 45
- Coaching career: 2019–present

Career history

Playing
- 2007–2008: Minnesota Lynx
- 2009–2011: Los Angeles Sparks
- 2012: Washington Mystics
- 2013–2014: Seattle Storm
- 2015–2016: Phoenix Mercury
- 2016–2018: Seattle Storm

Coaching
- 2019: Seattle Storm (assistant)
- 2020–2021: Seattle Storm (associate HC)
- 2021–2025: Seattle Storm
- 2026: Breeze BC
- 2026–present: UCLA (assistant)

Career highlights
- As player: WNBA champion (2018); 3× All Pac-10 (2004, 2006, 2007); Pac-10 Freshman of the Year (2004); Pac-10 All-Freshman Team (2004); McDonald's All-American (2003); As associate head coach: WNBA champion (2020); As head coach: Commissioner’s Cup champion (2021)
- Stats at WNBA.com
- Stats at Basketball Reference

Noelle Monique Quinn (born January 3, 1985) is an American basketball assistant coach for the UCLA Bruins, and a former player. She was the head coach for the Seattle Storm of the Women's National Basketball Association (WNBA). Quinn played in the WNBA for Minnesota Lynx, Los Angeles Sparks, Washington Mystics, Phoenix Mercury, and the Storm. She won the WNBA Championship with the Storm in 2018. She also played for Botaş SK in the Turkish Women's Basketball League.

== Early life ==
Born in Los Angeles, California, Quinn played for Bishop Montgomery High School in Torrance, California, where she was named a WBCA All-American. She participated in the 2003 WBCA High School All-America Game where she scored eleven points. She led the Lady Knights to four California state championships, three regional championships, and three division championships.

== College career ==
Quinn attended UCLA and graduated in 2007. She was the first Bruin — men's or women's player — to total 1,700 points, 700 rebounds, and 400 assists in her collegiate career. Quinn was twice named honorable mention All-American, earned first-team All-Pac-10 player honors three times, and was twice named a Pac-10 All-Tournament honoree. She was named Pac-10 Player of the Week eight times (a conference record). In 2006, she led the team to its first Pac-10 Tournament title and recorded 22 points in the championship game.

Quinn was inducted into the UCLA Hall of Fame in 2020.

=== College statistics ===
Legend
GP	Games played	GS	Games started	MPG	Minutes per game
FG%	Field goal percentage	3P%	3-point field goal percentage	FT%	Free throw percentage
RPG	Rebounds per game	APG	Assists per game	SPG	Steals per game
BPG	Blocks per game	PPG	Points per game	**Bold**	Career high

Year	Team	GP	Points	FG%	3P%	FT%	RPG	APG	SPG	BPG	PPG
2003–04	UCLA	27	430	42.3	26.1	71.6	7.7	3.1	2.2	0.4	15.9
2004–05	UCLA	16	270	41.7	30.0	75.0	7.1	3.6	**3.3**	0.5	16.9
2005–06	UCLA	**32**	**580**	**47.4**	37.3	74.4	**8.2**	3.8	1.5	**0.8**	**18.1**
2006–07	UCLA	**32**	549	40.8	**38.1**	**80.5**	6.6	**5.8**	1.2	0.3	17.2
Career	UCLA	107	1829	43.2	33.8	75.6	7.4	4.2	1.8	0.5	17.1

== Professional career ==
Quinn was drafted by the Minnesota Lynx in the first round of the 2007 WNBA draft. As a rookie she got off to a slow start before stepping into the point guard role when Lindsey Harding was injured in July, 2007. Quinn finished strong, setting a franchise record with 14 assists on August 19, the season finale. She finished the season averaging 2.8 points and 4.4 assists per game. Her 148 assists for the 2007 season, tied a club record that was held by Teresa Edwards.

In the 2009-10 WNBA off-season, Quinn played in Israel for Elitzur Ramla.

During a 12-year WNBA career, Quinn played for the Minnesota Lynx, Los Angeles Sparks, Washington Mystics, Phoenix Mercury, and Seattle Storm. She was a 6'0" combo guard who averaged 4.8 points per game and 2.3 assists per game for her career. With the Storm, she won the 2018 WNBA Championship.

== WNBA career statistics ==
Legend
GP	Games played	GS	Games started	MPG	Minutes per game	RPG	Rebounds per game
APG	Assists per game	SPG	Steals per game	BPG	Blocks per game	PPG	Points per game
TO	Turnovers per game	FG%	Field-goal percentage	3P%	3-point field-goal percentage	FT%	Free-throw percentage
**Bold**	Career best	°	League leader

†	Denotes seasons in which Quinn won a WNBA championship

=== Regular season ===
Year	Team	GP	GS	MPG	FG%	3P%	FT%	RPG	APG	SPG	BPG	TO	PPG
2007	Minnesota	**34**	19	19.7	.298	.184	.625	2.6	**4.4**	0.9	**0.4**	2.0	2.8
2008	Minnesota	32	25	16.7	.398	.313	.667	2.2	2.5	0.7	0.1	1.4	3.6
2009	Los Angeles	**34**	9	27.3	**.471**	.312	.811	3.6	3.5	**1.2**	0.3	1.5	8.4
2010	Los Angeles	**34**	**34**	**32.5**	.443	.402	.776	4.0	2.8	1.0	0.3	1.4	**10.2**
2011	Los Angeles	33	23	20.6	.390	.397	.818	1.8	2.0	0.6	0.1	0.7	5.1
2012	Washington	30	18	22.2	.396	**.403**	.731	2.9	1.8	0.7	0.2	1.0	6.5
2013	Seattle	**34**	15	25.6	.354	.232	.842	**4.9**	1.6	0.8	0.2	1.2	5.4
2014	Seattle	32	5	15.1	.380	.258	.880	2.5	1.3	0.5	0.1	0.6	3.8
2015	Phoenix	**34**	1	18.6	.422	.324	.792	2.6	1.9	0.4	0.3	0.9	4.1
2016	Phoenix	13	0	9.9	.241	.100	.857	0.9	1.4	0.4	0.2	0.8	1.6
2016	Seattle	20	0	13.9	.288	.083	**1.000**	1.8	1.6	0.5	0.1	1.0	1.8
2017	Seattle	32	4	15.8	.403	.385	.952	1.6	2.8	0.4	0.2	0.9	2.7
2018^{†}	Seattle	20	1	9.1	.302	.235	.000	0.9	0.8	0.1	0.1	0.5	1.5
Career	12 years, 5 teams	382	154	20.1	.396	.322	.797	2.6	2.3	0.7	0.2	1.1	4.8

=== Playoffs ===
Year	Team	GP	GS	MPG	FG%	3P%	FT%	RPG	APG	SPG	BPG	TO	PPG
2009	Los Angeles	**6**	**4**	26.3	.263	.100	**1.000**	3.2	**3.8**	**1.2**	**0.5**	3.2	4.8
2010	Los Angeles	2	2	**34.0**	.368	.500	**1.000**	**4.0**	0.5	1.0	0.0	1.5	**9.5**
2013	Seattle	2	0	26.5	.429	.333	.000	3.5	1.5	0.5	0.0	0.5	3.5
2015	Phoenix	4	0	20.3	.778	**1.000**	.000	2.8	0.8	0.5	0.3	0.8	4.3
2016	Seattle	1	0	11.0	.333	.000	.000	**4.0**	0.0	0.0	0.0	0.0	2.0
2017	Seattle	1	0	12.0	**1.000**	.000	.000	3.0	3.0	0.0	0.0	1.0	2.0
2018^{†}	Seattle	2	0	4.0	.000	.000	.000	0.5	0.0	0.0	0.0	0.0	0.0
Career	7 years, 3 teams	18	6	21.7	.372	.348	1.000	2.9	1.8	0.7	0.2	1.5	4.2

== International career ==
Quinn became a naturalized Bulgarian citizen in 2007 and played with the Bulgaria women's national basketball team.

== Coaching career ==
Beginning in 2016, Quinn coached the girls basketball team at her high school alma mater, Bishop Montgomery High School, for four seasons. In her first season, the Lady Knights won a California Interscholastic Federation (CIF) Southern Section championship.

In February 2019, after retiring from the WNBA, Quinn was hired as an assistant coach by her last team, the Seattle Storm.

For the 2020 season, Storm head coach Dan Hughes was forced to sit out the season for medical reasons. Gary Kloppenburg became head coach for the season, and Quinn was promoted to associate head coach, where she concentrated on the offense, while Kloppenburg focused on the defense. Seattle won the 2020 WNBA championship.

On May 30, 2021, Quinn was named Storm head coach upon Hughes' retirement from the WNBA. She was the head coach until the conclusion of the 2025 WNBA season, when the Storm organization announced she would not be returning as head coach. In the 2026 Unrivaled season, Quinn was a coach of the Breeze BC in Miami.

Quinn joined the coaching staff of the 2026–27 UCLA Bruins women's basketball team in August 2026.

== Coaching record ==
=== WNBA ===
Legend
Regular season	G	Games coached	W	Games won	L	Games lost	W–L %	Win–loss %
Playoffs	PG	Playoff games	PW	Playoff wins	PL	Playoff losses	PW–L %	Playoff win–loss %

Team	Year	G	W	L	W–L%	Finish	PG	PW	PL	PW–L%	Result
SEA	2021	26	16	10	.615	3rd in West	1	0	1	.000	Lost in Second round
SEA	2022	36	22	14	.611	2nd in West	6	3	3	.500	Lost in Conf. Semi-Finals
SEA	2023	40	11	29	.275	5th in West	–	–	–	–	Missed Playoffs
SEA	2024	40	25	15	.625	3rd in West	2	0	2	.000	Lost in First Round
SEA	2025	44	23	21	.523	4th in West	3	1	2	.333	Lost in First Round
Career		186	97	89	.522		12	4	8	.333	

== Personal ==
On September 23, 2009, Quinn returned to her college basketball court at Pauley Pavilion to play game one of the WNBA Conference finals between Phoenix Mercury and her Los Angeles Sparks, which the Sparks lost 94–103.
