= Jessica Davenport =

American basketball player (born 1985)

Personal information
- Born: June 24, 1985 (age 41) Columbus, Ohio, U.S.
- Listed height: 6 ft 5 in (1.96 m)
- Listed weight: 215 lb (98 kg)

Career information
- High school: Independence (Columbus, Ohio)
- College: Ohio State (2003–2007)
- WNBA draft: 2007: 1st round, 2nd overall pick
- Drafted by: New York Liberty
- Playing career: 2007–present
- Position: Center

Career history
- 2007–2008: New York Liberty
- 2009–2012: Indiana Fever

Career highlights
- WNBA champion (2012); 3× All-American – Kodak, USBWA (2005–2007); 2× First-team All-American – AP (2005, 2007); Second-team All-American – AP (2006); Big Ten Female Athlete of the Year (2007); 3× Chicago Tribune Silver Basketball (2005–2007); 3× Big Ten Player of the Year (2005–2007); 2× Big Ten All-Defensive Team (2006, 2007); 3× First-team All-Big Ten (2005–2007); Big Ten Freshman of the Year (2004); Big Ten All-Freshman Team (2004); McDonald's All-American (2003)
- Stats at WNBA.com
- Stats at Basketball Reference
Medals
Women's basketball
Representing USA
World University Games
Gold medal – first place	2005 Izmir	Team

Jessica Davenport (born June 24, 1985) is an American basketball player, formerly a reserve center for the WNBA's Indiana Fever. She previously played for The Ohio State University's women's basketball team.

== High school ==
Davenport played for Independence High School in Columbus, Ohio, where she was named a WBCA All-American. She participated in the 2003 WBCA High School All-America Game where she scored eight points.

== College ==
Davenport is 6'5" tall and weighs 215 pounds. Noted for her blocking and rebounding ability, she guided Ohio State to a 29–3 season and a number 1 seed in the NCAA tournament in 2005.

== Career statistics ==
=== WNBA ===
==== Regular season ====
Year	Team	GP	GS	MPG	FG%	3P%	FT%	RPG	APG	SPG	BPG	TO	PPG
2007	New York	33	**13**	11.6	44.5	0.0	**81.8**	2.7	0.3	0.2	0.9	1.3	5.3
2008	New York	14	3	11.0	47.5	0.0	60.0	2.9	0.3	0.3	0.7	1.3	4.6
2009	Indiana	26	0	7.0	52.7	0.0	70.0	1.5	0.2	0.3	0.5	**0.8**	2.8
2010	Indiana	33	0	14.2	**57.1**	14.3	72.5	2.8	0.5	0.4	0.8	1.2	7.4
2011	Indiana	**34**	8	**21.1**	52.9	0.0	70.2	**4.8**	0.5	**0.8**	**1.3**	1.6	**10.7**
2012	Indiana	**34**	2	15.1	46.9	**33.3**	74.1	3.4	**0.6**	0.7	0.8	1.5	6.7
Career	6 years, 2 teams	174	26	13.9	50.8	14.3	73.2	3.1	0.4	0.5	0.9	1.3	6.6

==== Playoffs ====
Year	Team	GP	GS	MPG	FG%	3P%	FT%	RPG	APG	SPG	BPG	TO	PPG
2007	New York	2	0	5.0	0.0	0.0	75.0	1.5	0.0	0.0	0.0	1.5	1.5
2008	New York	4	0	6.3	40.0	0.0	50.0	1.3	0.0	0.3	0.3	0.5	2.5
2009	Indiana	**9**	0	6.1	**56.0**	0.0	81.8	1.2	0.3	0.2	0.9	**0.3**	4.1
2010	Indiana	3	0	15.3	52.9	0.0	**100.0**	**5.3**	0.0	**0.7**	**1.3**	1.3	7.0
2011	Indiana	6	0	**16.5**	55.6	0.0	85.7	3.8	0.0	0.5	0.2	1.7	**7.7**
2012	Indiana	7	0	10.1	48.1	0.0	**100.0**	2.3	**0.7**	0.1	0.7	1.4	3.9
Career	6 years, 2 teams	31	0	9.9	51.3	0.0	80.0	2.4	0.3	0.3	0.6	1.0	4.6

=== College ===
Legend
GP	Games played	GS	Games started	MPG	Minutes per game
FG%	Field goal percentage	3P%	3-point field goal percentage	FT%	Free throw percentage
RPG	Rebounds per game	APG	Assists per game	SPG	Steals per game
BPG	Blocks per game	PPG	Points per game	**Bold**	Career high

Year	Team	GP	Points	FG%	3P%	FT%	RPG	APG	SPG	BPG	PPG
2003–04	Ohio State	31	389	**62.2**	-	65.4	5.7	1.0	0.6	2.6	12.5
2004–05	Ohio State	**35**	**677**	58.7	25.0	77.2	9.3	1.6	0.8	**3.3**	19.3
2005–06	Ohio State	32	598	61.8	**53.8**	74.2	8.9	1.8	0.6	3.1	18.7
2006–07	Ohio State	32	639	59.7	11.1	**79.2**	**9.6**	**2.5**	**0.8**	2.8	**20.0**
Career	Ohio State	130	2303	60.4	34.6	75.0	8.4	1.7	0.7	3.0	17.7

== USA Basketball ==
Davenport was a member of the United States women's national basketball team in 2005 and 2006, while at Ohio state, and in 2007 and 2008 while on the New York Liberty team. Davenport was the third leading scorer on the 2005 World University Games Team in Izmir, Turkey. She helped the team to a 7–0 record, and a gold medal at the event. Davenport joined the National team in 2006 for the 2006 Opals World Challenge. The team went 4–1. winning all games other than the final against Australia. Davenport was also part of the National team in 2007–08, participating on the Tour of Italy and the Australia Exhibition. The National team was 4–0 on the Tour of Italy and 2–0 at the Australia Exhibition.

== Professional ==
Davenport was drafted second overall by the San Antonio Silver Stars in the 2007 WNBA draft. Immediately thereafter, Davenport's rights were traded to the New York Liberty along with the Silver Stars' 2008 first-round draft pick in exchange for guard Becky Hammon and the Liberty's second-round pick in 2008. Within the Liberty's first five games, she developed a reputation as a consistent scorer and strong post presence.

Davenport was waived by the Liberty prior to the 2009 season. She was signed by the Fever as a replacement for the injured Yolanda Griffith.

Davenport has expressed a desire to pursue a career in marketing at the conclusion of her basketball career.
