= Vanessa Hayden =

American basketball player (born 1982)

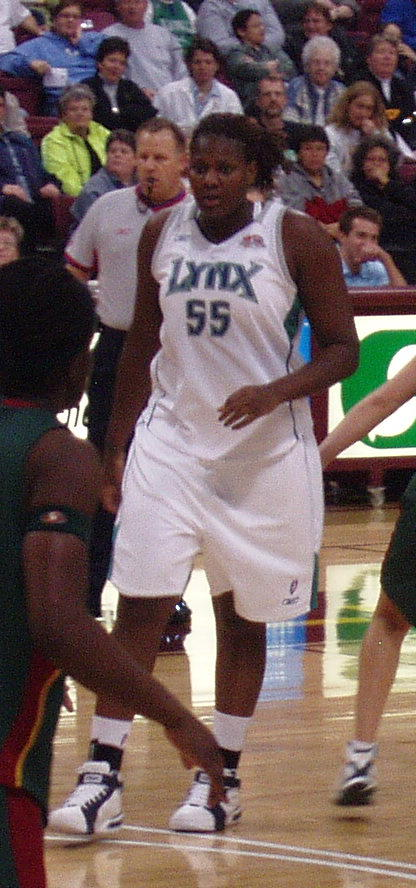

Personal information
- Born: June 5, 1982 (age 44) Orlando, Florida, U.S.
- Listed height: 6 ft 4 in (1.93 m)
- Listed weight: 240 lb (109 kg)

Career information
- High school: William R. Boone (Orlando, Florida)
- College: Florida (2000–2004)
- WNBA draft: 2004: 1st round, 7th overall pick
- Drafted by: Minnesota Lynx
- Playing career: 2004–2009
- Position: Center
- Number: 55

Career history
- 2004–2008: Minnesota Lynx
- 2009: Los Angeles Sparks

Career highlights
- SEC Defensive Player of the Year (2004); 2× First-team All-SEC (2002, 2004); Second-team All-American – AP (2004); SEC All-Freshman Team (2001)
- Stats at Basketball Reference

Vanessa L'asonya Hayden-Johnson (born June 5, 1982), née Vanessa L'asonya Hayden, is an American former college and professional basketball player who was a center in the Women's National Basketball Association (WNBA) for five seasons in the 2000s. Hayden played college basketball for the University of Florida, and she played professionally for the Minnesota Lynx and Los Angeles Sparks of the WNBA.

== Early years ==
Hayden was born in Orlando, Florida. She attended William R. Boone High School in Orlando, and played high school basketball for the Boone Braves.

== College career ==
Hayden accepted an athletic scholarship to attend the University of Florida in Gainesville, Florida, where she played for the Florida Gators women's basketball team from 2000 to 2004. As a senior in 2004, she was a first-team All-Southeastern Conference (SEC) selection, SEC Defensive Player of the year, and a second-team All-American. She graduated with a bachelor's degree in 2004.

== Florida statistics ==
Legend
GP	Games played	GS	Games started	MPG	Minutes per game
FG%	Field goal percentage	3P%	3-point field goal percentage	FT%	Free throw percentage
RPG	Rebounds per game	APG	Assists per game	SPG	Steals per game
BPG	Blocks per game	PPG	Points per game	**Bold**	Career high

Year	Team	GP	Points	FG%	3P%	FT%	RPG	APG	SPG	BPG	PPG
2000-01	Florida	**30**	312	**52.2**	-	47.0	9.2	0.6	**1.0**	2.3	10.4
2001-02	Florida	29	496	50.6	-	**61.5**	**11.8**	**1.4**	0.8	**4.3**	17.1
2002-03	Florida	18	197	44.0	-	60.3	9.4	0.8	0.8	3.1	10.9
2003-04	Florida	**30**	**571**	**52.2**	-	59.1	10.6	1.3	0.9	3.5	**19.0**
Career	Florida	107	1576	50.5	-	57.2	10.3	1.0	0.9	3.3	14.7

== Professional career ==
Following her collegiate career, she was selected 7th overall in the 2004 WNBA draft. As a rookie in 2004, Hayden-Johnson averaged 5.3 points and 2.9 rebounds per game. In 2005, she improved, averaging 7.9 points and 5.3 rebounds per game.

The 2006 season was a struggle for the third-year center. After reporting to the pre-season training camp 20 pounds overweight, Hayden-Johnson lost her starting job early on and remained prone to foul trouble. With her minutes cut, she averaged 5.4 points and 3.5 rebounds per game.

Hayden-Johnson missed the entire 2007 WNBA season to give birth to her first child. She returned to action in 2008 as a reserve for the Lynx. On January 30, 2009, Hayden-Johnson was traded to the Los Angeles Sparks for Christi Thomas.

== WNBA career statistics ==
Legend
GP	Games played	GS	Games started	MPG	Minutes per game	RPG	Rebounds per game
APG	Assists per game	SPG	Steals per game	BPG	Blocks per game	PPG	Points per game
TO	Turnovers per game	FG%	Field-goal percentage	3P%	3-point field-goal percentage	FT%	Free-throw percentage
**Bold**	Career best	°	League leader

=== Regular season ===
Year	Team	GP	GS	MPG	FG%	3P%	FT%	RPG	APG	SPG	BPG	TO	PPG
2004	Minnesota	29	1	12.1	.415	.000	.553	2.9	0.2	0.2	1.0	1.2	5.3
2005	Minnesota	31	**25**	**19.2**	.433	.000	.556	**5.3**	**0.7**	**0.5**	**2.2**	2.0	**7.9**
2006	Minnesota	**33**	3	12.8	.402	.000	.621	3.5	0.6	0.2	1.3	1.3	5.4
2008	Minnesota	30	0	10.1	**.445**	.000	.614	3.5	0.4	**0.5**	0.5	0.9	5.2
2009	Los Angeles	25	1	10.8	.411	.000	**.640**	2.7	0.2	0.2	0.9	0.8	3.8
Career	5 years, 2 teams	148	30	13.1	.423	.000	.592	3.6	0.5	0.3	1.2	1.3	5.6

=== Playoffs ===
Year	Team	GP	GS	MPG	FG%	3P%	FT%	RPG	APG	SPG	BPG	TO	PPG
2004	Minnesota	**2**	0	**8.0**	**.286**	.000	.000	1.0'	0.0	0.0	**0.5**	1.5	**2.0**
2009	Los Angeles	1	0	2.0	.000	.000	.000	0.0	0.0	0.0	0.0	0.0	0.0
Career	2 years, 2 teams	3	0	6.0	.286	.000	.000	0.7	0.0	0.0	0.3	1.0	1.3

== European career ==
- 2004–06: CB Halcón Viajes (Spain)
- 2007–08: Beşiktaş Cola Turka (Turkey)
- 2008–09: Umana Reyer Venezia (Italy)

== Personal life ==
Hayden was a contestant on Season 16 of the reality competition The Biggest Loser, titled The Biggest Loser: Glory Days, which premiered on September 11, 2014, on NBC.

== See also ==
- List of Florida Gators in the WNBA
- List of University of Florida alumni
