= 2009 Los Angeles Sparks season =

- Head coach: Michael Cooper
- Arena: STAPLES Center

Results
- Record: 18–16 (.529)
- Place: 3rd (Western)
- Playoff finish: Lost Conference Finals

Media
- Television: Fox Sports West

The 2009 Los Angeles Sparks season was the franchise's 13th season in the Women's National Basketball Association, and the third and final season under head coach Michael Cooper. Lisa Leslie announced that the 2009 season would be her last. On June 5, the Sparks and Farmers Insurance Group of Companies announced a multi-year marketing partnership that includes a branded jersey sponsorship. The Farmers Insurance branded jersey will be worn by the players for the first time on June 6. As part of this alliance, the Farmers Insurance name and logo will appear on the front of the Sparks jerseys and will have considerable visibility in the Staples Center during home games. Los Angeles became only the second WNBA team to finalize such an agreement. The Sparks attempted to reach the playoffs and were successful.

== Offseason ==
- On May 13, Sparks star Candace Parker gave birth to a baby girl. It is the first child for the WNBA’s reigning MVP and rookie of the year and husband Shelden Williams of the Boston Celtics. Goodwin Sports Management announced the baby girl was born in Los Angeles. She weighed 7 pounds, 6 ounces and was 20 inches long.

=== Dispersal Draft ===
Based on the Sparks' 2008 record, they would pick 9th in the Houston Comets dispersal draft. The Sparks waived their pick.

=== WNBA draft ===
The following are the Sparks' selections in the 2009 WNBA draft.

| Round | Pick | Player | Nationality | School/Team/Country |
|---|---|---|---|---|
| 1 | 13 | Lindsay Wisdom-Hylton | United States | Purdue |
| 2 | 22 | Ashley Paris | United States | Oklahoma |
| 3 | 35 | Britney Jordan | United States | Texas A&M-Commerce |

=== Transactions ===
- June 5: The Sparks waived Jessica Moore.
- June 4: The Sparks waived Ashley Paris and Marta Fernandez.
- May 18: The Sparks waived Britney Jordan.
- May 7: The Sparks signed Kristi Harrower to a training camp contract.
- May 5: The Sparks then traded the pick from the Liberty and Rafaella Masciadri to the Minnesota Lynx in exchange for Noelle Quinn.
- May 5: The Sparks traded Sidney Spencer to the New York Liberty in exchange for a first round 2010 WNBA Draft pick.
- April 14: The Sparks signed Betty Lennox.
- April 14: The Sparks waived Murriel Page.
- March 26: The Sparks traded Temeka Johnson to the Phoenix Mercury in exchange for a first-round 2010 WNBA Draft pick.
- March 25: The Sparks signed Marta Fernandez.
- March 12: The Sparks signed Tina Thompson.
- January 30: The Sparks traded Christi Thomas to the Minnesota Lynx in exchange for Vanessa Hayden-Johnson.
- December 17, 2008: The Sparks traded the rights to Chamique Holdsclaw to the Atlanta Dream in exchange for the 13th pick in the 2009 WNBA Draft.
- April 21, 2008: The Sparks traded their first-round draft pick in the 2009 WNBA Draft to the Washington Mystics as part of the Taj McWilliams-Franklin/Delisha Milton-Jones transaction.

| Date | Trade | |
|---|---|---|
| December 17, 2008 | To Los Angeles Sparks | To Atlanta Dream |
| December 17, 2008 | 13th pick in the 2009 WNBA Draft | rights to Chamique Holdsclaw |
| January 30, 2009 | To Los Angeles Sparks | To Minnesota Lynx |
| January 30, 2009 | Vanessa Hayden-Johnson | Christi Thomas |
| March 26, 2009 | To Los Angeles Sparks | To Phoenix Mercury |
| March 26, 2009 | first-round 2010 WNBA Draft pick | Temeka Johnson |
| May 5, 2009 | To Los Angeles Sparks | To New York Liberty |
| May 5, 2009 | first-round 2010 WNBA Draft pick | Sidney Spencer |
| May 5, 2009 | To Los Angeles Sparks | To Minnesota Lynx |
| May 5, 2009 | Noelle Quinn | Rafaella Masciadri and a first-round 2010 WNBA Draft pick |

=== Free agents ===
==== Additions ====
| Player | Signed | Former team |
| Tina Thompson | March 12, 2009 | Houston Comets |
| Betty Lennox | April 14, 2009 | Atlanta Dream |
| Noelle Quinn | May 5, 2009 | Minnesota Lynx |
| Kristi Harrower | May 7, 2009 | Minnesota Lynx |

==== Subtractions ====
| Player | Left | New team |
| Temeka Johnson | March 26, 2009 | Phoenix Mercury |
| Murriel Page | April 14, 2009 | free agent |
| Kiesha Brown | May 1, 2009 | Washington Mystics |
| Sidney Spencer | May 5, 2009 | New York Liberty |
| Rafaella Masciadri | May 5, 2009 | Minnesota Lynx |
| Britney Jordan | May 18, 2009 | free agent |
| Ashley Paris | June 4, 2009 | free agent |
| Jessica Moore | June 5, 2009 | free agent |
| Margo Dydek | 2009 | free agent |

== Roster ==
2009 Los Angeles Sparks roster
Players
Coaches

| Pos. | No. | Nat. | Name | Height | Weight | From |
|---|---|---|---|---|---|---|
| PG | 6 | (United States) | Bobbitt, Shannon | 5' 2" (1.57m) | 130 lb (59kg) | Tennessee |
| SG | 24 | (United States) | Ferdinand-Harris, Marie | 5' 9" (1.75m) | 153 lb (69kg) | LSU |
| PG | 10 | (Australia) | Harrower, Kristi | 5' 4" (1.63m) | 139 lb (63kg) | Australia |
| C | 55 | (United States) | Hayden, Vanessa | 6' 4" (1.93m) | 240 lb (109kg) | Florida |
| SG | 22 | (United States) | Lennox, Betty | 5' 8" (1.73m) | 143 lb (65kg) | Louisiana Tech |
| C | 9 | (United States) | Leslie, Lisa | 6' 5" (1.96m) | 170 lb (77kg) | USC |
| SF | 8 | (United States) | Milton-Jones, DeLisha | 6' 1" (1.85m) | 185 lb (84kg) | Florida |
| F | 3 | (United States) | Parker, Candace | 6' 4" (1.93m) | 175 lb (79kg) | Tennessee |
| F | 15 | (United States) | Pringle, LaToya | 6' 3" (1.91m) | 162 lb (73kg) | North Carolina |
| PG | 45 | (United States) | Quinn, Noelle | 6' 0" (1.83m) | 175 lb (79kg) | UCLA |
| F | 32 | (United States) | Thompson, Tina | 6' 2" (1.88m) | 178 lb (81kg) | USC |
| F | 14 | (United States) | Wisdom-Hylton, Lindsay | 6' 2" (1.88m) | 186 lb (84kg) | Purdue |

Head coach
(United States) Michael Cooper (New Mexico)
Assistant coaches
Laura Beeman (Cal State San Bernardino)
(United States) Marianne Stanley (Immaculata)
Athletic trainer
(United States) Rachel Schlachet (Arizona State)
Strength and conditioning coach
(United States) Bruce Deziel

Legend

- (C) Team captain
- (DP) Unsigned draft pick
- (FA) Free agent
- (S) Suspended
- Injured

WNBA roster page

== Season standings ==
| Western Conference | W | L | PCT | GB | Home | Road | Conf. |
|---|---|---|---|---|---|---|---|
| Phoenix Mercury ^{x} | 23 | 11 | .676 | – | 12–5 | 11–6 | 13–7 |
| Seattle Storm ^{x} | 20 | 14 | .588 | 3.0 | 13–4 | 7–10 | 13–7 |
| Los Angeles Sparks ^{x} | 18 | 16 | .529 | 5.0 | 11–6 | 7–10 | 11–9 |
| San Antonio Silver Stars ^{x} | 15 | 19 | .441 | 8.0 | 10–7 | 5–12 | 10–10 |
| Minnesota Lynx ^{o} | 14 | 20 | .412 | 9.0 | 9–8 | 5–12 | 7–13 |
| Sacramento Monarchs ^{o} | 12 | 22 | .353 | 11.0 | 7–10 | 5–12 | 6–14 |

== Schedule ==
=== Preseason ===
2009 Game Log: Preseason

| Game | Date | Time (ET) | Opponent | Score | High points | High rebounds | High assists | Location/Attendance | Record |
|---|---|---|---|---|---|---|---|---|---|
| 1 | May 31 | 3:00pm | @ Connecticut | 80-77 | Thompson (14) | Leslie, Wisdom-Hylton (6) | Lennox (4) | Mohegan Sun Arena; 6,630 | 1-0 |

=== Regular season ===
2009 Game Log: Regular Season
June

| Game | Date | Time (ET) | Opponent | TV | Score | High points | High rebounds | High assists | Location/Attendance | Record |
|---|---|---|---|---|---|---|---|---|---|---|
| 1 | June 6 | 2:30pm | Detroit | ABC | 78-58 | Thompson (18) | Lennox (10) | Harrower (7) | STAPLES Center; 13,154 | 1-0 |
| 2 | June 8 | 7:30pm | @ Detroit | | 52-81 | Thompson (14) | Thompson (11) | Milton-Jones, Quinn (3) | Palace of Auburn Hills; 13,915 | 1-1 |
| 3 | June 10 | 8:00pm | @ Minnesota | | 76-87 | Lennox (25) | Lennox, Leslie (8) | Quinn (4) | Target Center; 7,444 | 1-2 |
| 4 | June 12 | 7:00pm | @ Indiana | | 61-73 | Leslie (21) | Leslie (13) | Harrower (3) | Conseco Fieldhouse; 9,320 | 1-3 |
| 5 | June 19 | 10:00pm | @ Phoenix | | 80-89 | Lennox (16) | Thompson (14) | Quinn (6) | US Airways Center; 8,255 | 1-4 |
| 6 | June 21 | 9:30pm | Sacramento | NBA TV; FSNW | 67-47 | Hayden, Thompson (12) | Hayden, Lennox (8) | Bobbitt (5) | STAPLES Center; 9,494 | 2-4 |
| 7 | June 26 | 10:00pm | @ Seattle | | 67-69 | Thompson (20) | Milton-Jones (7) | Lennox (5) | KeyArena; 9,686 | 2-5 |
| 8 | June 28 | 9:30pm | Seattle | NBA TV; FSNW | 82-55 | Ferdinand-Harris (15) | Quinn (6) | Harrower (5) | STAPLES Center; 10,797 | 3-5 |

July

| Game | Date | Time (ET) | Opponent | TV | Score | High points | High rebounds | High assists | Location/Attendance | Record |
|---|---|---|---|---|---|---|---|---|---|---|
| 9 | July 5 | 9:30pm | Phoenix | NBA TV; FSNW | 89-104 | Lennox, Thompson (17) | Milton-Jones (7) | Bobbitt (6) | STAPLES Center; 9,872 | 3-6 |
| 10 | July 9 | 7:30pm | @ New York | MSG | 69-60 | Lennox (20) | Thompson (8) | Harrower, Ferdinand-Harris (3) | Madison Square Garden; 12,247 | 4-6 |
| 11 | July 11 | 7:00pm | @ Washington | | 63-75 | Bobbitt, Lennox (10) | Milton-Jones, Thompson (7) | Harrower (3) | Verizon Center; 12,217 | 4-7 |
| 12 | July 14 | 7:00pm | @ Connecticut | ESPN2 | 71-82 | Milton-Jones (19) | Lennox (11) | Lennox, Milton-Jones, Parker (2) | Mohegan Sun Arena; 6,612 | 4-8 |
| 13 | July 22 | 10:30pm | @ Seattle | | 87-98 (3OT) | Thompson (22) | Lennox (12) | Parker (5) | KeyArena; 7,154 | 4-9 |
| 14 | July 28 | 8:00pm | @ Minnesota | | 76-70 | Thompson (30) | Parker (10) | Lennox, Thompson (4) | Target Center; 7,216 | 5-9 |
| 15 | July 29 | 8:00pm | @ Chicago | | 63-75 | Milton-Jones (15) | Parker (10) | Thompson (4) | UIC Pavilion; 5,633 | 5-10 |

August

| Game | Date | Time (ET) | Opponent | TV | Score | High points | High rebounds | High assists | Location/Attendance | Record |
|---|---|---|---|---|---|---|---|---|---|---|
| 16 | August 1 | 10:00pm | @ Sacramento | | 59-56 | Parker, Milton-Jones (13) | Parker (12) | Harrower (6) | ARCO Arena; 7,204 | 6-10 |
| 17 | August 4 | 3:00pm | San Antonio | | 59-63 | Leslie, Quinn (13) | Thompson (12) | Quinn (4) | STAPLES Center; 13,865 | 6-11 |
| 18 | August 6 | 10:30pm | Seattle | | 79-75 (OT) | Quinn (23) | Parker (13) | Leslie (4) | STAPLES Center; 9,735 | 7-11 |
| 19 | August 10 | 10:30pm | Indiana | | 75-63 | Leslie (21) | Leslie (11) | Milton-Jones (4) | STAPLES Center; 8,263 | 8-11 |
| 20 | August 11 | 9:00pm | New York | ESPN2 | 61-65 | Leslie (12) | Parker (11) | Bobbitt, Harrower, Quinn (2) | STAPLES Center; 9,548 | 8-12 |
| 21 | August 14 | 10:30pm | Sacramento | | 79-85 | Leslie (25) | Parker (10) | Quinn (5) | STAPLES Center; 10,122 | 8-13 |
| 22 | August 15 | 10:00pm | @ Sacramento | | 78-61 | Parker (18) | Leslie (9) | Milton-Jones, Quinn, Thompson (4) | ARCO Arena; 7,646 | 9-13 |
| 23 | August 18 | 10:30pm | Washington | | 72-69 | Leslie (20) | Parker (12) | Parker, Quinn (5) | STAPLES Center; 9,287 | 10-13 |
| 24 | August 19 | 10:30pm | Minnesota | | 78-63 | Leslie (28) | Parker (10) | Quinn (7) | STAPLES Center; 9,181 | 11-13 |
| 25 | August 21 | 8:00pm | @ San Antonio | NBA TV; KMYS | 67-66 (OT) | Parker (17) | Parker, Thompson (12) | Leslie (4) | AT&T Center; 9,540 | 12-13 |
| 26 | August 23 | 3:00pm | @ Atlanta | | 91-87 | Parker (23) | Lennox, Parker (8) | Thompson (6) | Philips Arena; 11,304 | 13-13 |
| 27 | August 25 | 10:00pm | Chicago | ESPN2 | 75-63 | Leslie, Parker (21) | Parker (12) | Bobbitt, Thompson (3) | STAPLES Center; 9,615 | 14-13 |
| 28 | August 27 | 10:30pm | Phoenix | NBA TV; FSNW | 90-98 | Leslie (23) | Lennox (6) | Quinn (8) | STAPLES Center; 9,586 | 14-14 |
| 29 | August 30 | 9:30pm | Connecticut | NBA TV; FSNW | 91-81 | Thompson (21) | Parker (13) | Milton-Jones, Quinn (5) | STAPLES Center; 11,072 | 15-14 |

September

| Game | Date | Time (ET) | Opponent | TV | Score | High points | High rebounds | High assists | Location/Attendance | Record |
|---|---|---|---|---|---|---|---|---|---|---|
| 30 | September 1 | 10:30pm | Atlanta | | 79-84 | Leslie (24) | Parker (14) | Lennox (5) | STAPLES Center; 8,756 | 15-15 |
| 31 | September 5 | 8:00pm | @ San Antonio | | 72-89 | Leslie (21) | Parker (10) | Parker (8) | AT&T Center; 8,631 | 15-16 |
| 32 | September 8 | 10:30pm | San Antonio | NBA TV; KMYS | 76-68 | Leslie (18) | Parker (13) | Quinn (6) | STAPLES Center; 10,476 | 16-16 |
| 33 | September 11 | 10:30pm | Minnesota | NBA TV; FSNW | 90-64 | Leslie, Thompson (19) | Parker (14) | Quinn (9) | STAPLES Center; 13,764 | 17-16 |
| 34 | September 13 | 3:00pm | @ Phoenix | ESPN2 | 81–78 | Parker (24) | Parker (14) | Lennox (6) | US Airways Center; 12,968 | 18–16 |

All games are viewable on WNBA LiveAccess

=== Postseason ===
2009 Game Log: Postseason
Western Conference Semifinals

| Game | Date | Time (ET) | Opponent | TV | Score | High points | High rebounds | High assists | Location/Attendance | Series |
|---|---|---|---|---|---|---|---|---|---|---|
| 1 | September 16 | 10:00pm | Seattle | ESPN2 | 70-63 | Thompson (16) | Leslie, Parker (10) | Harrower (5) | STAPLES Center; 7,919 | 1-0 |
| 2 | September 18 | 10:00pm | @ Seattle | NBA TV | 74-75 | Lennox (17) | Leslie (14) | Quinn (5) | KeyArena; 8,854 | 1-1 |
| 3 | September 20 | 5:00pm | @ Seattle | ESPN2 | 75-64 | Parker (22) | Milton-Jones (9) | Quinn (7) | KeyArena; 8,159 | 2-1 |

Western Conference Finals

| Game | Date | Time (ET) | Opponent | TV | Score | High points | High rebounds | High assists | Location/Attendance | Series |
|---|---|---|---|---|---|---|---|---|---|---|
| 1 | September 23 | 10:00pm | Phoenix | ESPN2 | 94-103 | Parker (28) | Parker (10) | Thompson (5) | Pauley Pavilion; 6,389 | 0-1 |
| 2 | September 25 | 10:00pm | @ Phoenix | NBA TV | 87-76 | Parker (24) | Parker (18) | Quinn (4) | US Airways Center; 7,628 | 1-1 |
| 3 | September 26 | 10:00pm | @ Phoenix | NBA TV | 74-85 | Leslie (22) | Thompson (11) | Lennox, Thompson (3) | US Airways Center; 7,226 | 1-2 |

== Regular season statistics ==
Legend
| GP | Games played | GS | Games started | MPG | Minutes per game | RPG | Rebounds per game |
| APG | Assists per game | SPG | Steals per game | BPG | Blocks per game | PPG | Points per game |
| FG% | Field-goal percentage | 3P% | 3-point field-goal percentage | FT% | Free-throw percentage | TO | Turnovers per game |
| PF | Fouls per game | | Team leader | | League leader |

=== Player statistics ===
| Player | GP | GS | MPG | RPG | APG | SPG | BPG | PPG |
|---|---|---|---|---|---|---|---|---|
| Shannon Bobbitt | 33 | 3 | 10.7 | 1.0 | 1.4 | 0.45 | 0.03 | 2.2 |
| Marie Ferdinand-Harris | 28 | 6 | 12.1 | 1.5 | 0.9 | 0.54 | 0.07 | 5.4 |
| Kristi Harrower | 31 | 26 | 16.8 | 1.8 | 2.2 | 0.52 | 0.00 | 3.1 |
| Vanessa Hayden | 25 | 1 | 10.8 | 2.7 | 0.2 | 0.16 | 0.88 | 3.8 |
| Betty Lennox | 30 | 13 | 21.3 | 4.5 | 1.8 | 0.87 | 0.13 | 10.2 |
| Lisa Leslie | 23 | 21 | 27.7 | 6.6 | 2.1 | 0.70 | 1.43 | 15.4 |
| Delisha Milton-Jones | 33 | 33 | 31.6 | 4.8 | 2.2 | 1.24 | 0.24 | 10.2 |
| Candace Parker | 25 | 24 | 32.6 | 9.8 | 2.6 | 0.60 | 2.12 | 13.1 |
| Noelle Quinn | 34 | 9 | 27.3 | 3.6 | 3.5 | 1.18 | 0.32 | 8.4 |
| Tina Thompson | 34 | 34 | 34.8 | 5.9 | 2.3 | 0.76 | 0.71 | 13.0 |
| Lindsay Wisdom-Hylton | 29 | 0 | 6.8 | 1.4 | 0.3 | 0.10 | 0.28 | 2.4 |

=== Team statistics ===
| Team | FG% | 3P% | FT% | RPG | APG | SPG | BPG | TO | PF | PPG |
|---|---|---|---|---|---|---|---|---|---|---|
| Los Angeles Sparks | .430 | .297 | .791 | 36.7 | 17.3 | 6.4 | 4.9 | 16.7 | 17.1 | 74.5 |
| Opponents | .399 | .335 | .769 | 30.9 | 15.2 | 8.8 | 3.4 | 13.6 | 18.3 | 73.5 |

== Awards and honors ==
- Candace Parker was named WNBA Western Conference Player of the Week for the week of August 17, 2009.
- Candace Parker was named WNBA Western Conference Player of the Week for the week of September 7, 2009.
- Lisa Leslie was named to the 2009 WNBA All-Star Team as a Western Conference starter.
- Tina Thompson was named to the 2009 WNBA All-Star Team as a Western Conference reserve.
- Candace Parker was named to the All-WNBA Second Team.
- Lisa Leslie was named to the All-WNBA Second Team.
- Candace Parker was named to the All-Defensive Second Team.
