= 2003 McDonald's All-American Girls Game =

West	East
99	72
- Date: March 26, 2003
- Venue: Gund Arena, Cleveland, Ohio
- MVP: Katie Gearlds
- Network: ESPN

McDonald's All-American

The 2003 McDonald's All-American Girls Game was an all-star basketball game that was played at Gund Arena in Cleveland, Ohio. The game's rosters featured the best and most highly recruited high school girls graduating in the class of 2003. The game was the 2nd annual version of the McDonald's All-American Game first played in 2002. The 24 players were selected from over 700 nominees by a committee of basketball experts. They were chosen not only for their on-court skills, but for their performances off the court as well.

== Rosters ==
The roster was announced on February 27, 2003. Ohio State, North Carolina, Vanderbilt, Texas, and Purdue had the most selections with two each.

=== Team East ===
Name	Height	Position	Hometown	High school	College choice
Alison Bales	6–6	C	Dayton, Ohio	Beavercreek	Duke
Cori Chambers	5–10	SF	Elmsford, New York	The Ursuline School	Georgia
Jessica Davenport	6–6	C	Columbus, Ohio	Independence (OH)	Ohio State
Dee Davis	5–5	PG	Cincinnati, Ohio	Princeton (OH)	Vanderbilt
Shay Doron	5–8	SG	Ramat Hasharon, Israel	Christ the King Regional	Maryland
Jennifer Harris	6–0	SF	Harrisburg, Pennsylvania	Central Dauphin	Penn State
Brandie Hoskins	5–11	SG	Dayton, Ohio	Chaminade Julienne	Ohio State
Brittany Hunter	6–4	PF	Columbus, Ohio	Brookhaven (OH)	Duke
Ivory Latta	5–6	PG	McConnells, South Carolina	York	North Carolina
Camille Little	6–1	PF	Winston-Salem, North Carolina	Carver (NC)	North Carolina
Dominique Redding	6–1	SF	Clearwater, Florida	Clearwater	Tennessee
Dorian Williams	5–7	PG	Jacksonville, Florida	Jean Ribault	Florida State

=== Team West ===
Name	Height	Position	Hometown	High school	College choice
Brooke Baughman	5–10	PG	Canyon, Texas	Canyon (Canyon, TX)	Texas Tech
Kalee Carey	6–5	C	Canyon, Texas	Canyon (Canyon, TX)	Texas
Lauren Ervin	6–4	PF	Inglewood, California	Inglewood (CA)	Kansas
Crystal Erwin	6–1	PF	Rancho Cucamonga, California	St. Paul (CA)	Notre Dame
Katie Gearlds	6–1	SG	Beach Grove, Indiana	Beach Grove	Purdue
Jennifer Hall	6–2	SF	Folsom, California	Folsom	Vanderbilt
Tiffany Jackson	6–4	C	Dallas, Texas	Duncanville	Texas
Britney Jordan	5–8	SG	Peoria, Illinois	Woodruff	Temple
Erin Lawless	6–2	SF	Berwyn, Illinois	Fenwick	Purdue
Liz Podominick	6–2	SF	Lakeville, Minnesota	Lakeville North	Minnesota
Noelle Quinn	6–0	PG	Los Angeles, California	Bishop Montgomery	UCLA
Elizabeth Sherwood	6–4	SF	Castle Rock, Colorado	Highlands Ranch	Connecticut
