= Shannon Bobbitt =

American basketball player (born 1985)

Personal information
- Born: December 6, 1985 (age 40) Bronx, New York, U.S.
- Listed height: 5 ft 2 in (1.57 m)
- Listed weight: 130 lb (59 kg)

Career information
- High school: Murry Bergtraum (New York City, New York)
- College: Trinity Valley CC (2004–2006); Tennessee (2006–2008)
- WNBA draft: 2008: 2nd round, 15th overall pick
- Drafted by: Los Angeles Sparks
- Position: Guard

Career history
- 2008–2009: Los Angeles Sparks
- 2011: Indiana Fever
- 2012: Washington Mystics

Career highlights
- NCAA champion (2007, 2008)
- Stats at WNBA.com
- Stats at Basketball Reference

Shannon Denise Bobbitt (born December 6, 1985) is an American professional basketball player, most recently for the WNBA's Washington Mystics.

One of eight children and a Bronx native, New Yorker Bobbitt honed her basketball skills on the neighborhood project courts of Harlem. Following a stellar college career in which 5'2" Bobbitt won two Division I national titles at the University of Tennessee, she entered the WNBA and began her professional basketball career playing point guard for the Los Angeles Sparks.

== High school ==
Bobbitt attended Murry Bergtraum High School in New York, where she helped lead her team to two straight PSAL and State Federation titles.

As a sophomore, she gained attention for her basketball skills, city rankings had her listed as the second-best player. During her junior season, her team went undefeated posting a record of 30–0 before winning the national high school championship. She finished her high school career by helping her team post a 29–1 record, which was good for third in the nation.

== Junior college ==
Bobbitt decided that junior college was her best option out of high school, so she chose Trinity Valley Community College in Athens, Texas because they had just won a national title.

During the 2005–06 season, Bobbitt handed out 211 assists to rank third in the nation in assists broke the 22-year-old school record at Trinity Valley for her career in that category. She led Trinity Valley to the NJCAA National Tournament and the 2006 Region XIV Championship with a 30–2 record overall and 18–0 mark in conference play. She was voted as the 2006 Women's Basketball Coaches Association Junior College Player of the Year.

The NJCAA Women’s Basketball Coaches Association inducted her into the Hall of Fame in 2017.

== Division I ==
Bobbitt help guide the Volunteers to the regular-season SEC title in 2006–2007. Bobbitt's play was also key in ending the nine-year UT title drought, as the Volunteers defeated Rutgers for the National Championship on April 3, 2007. Bobbitt was named to the All-Tournament team.

The defending champions successfully defended their title in 2007–2008, again behind their point guard, who guided them to a title by defeating Stanford on April 8, 2008.

She graduated with Candace Parker of the Los Angeles Sparks and Alexis Hornbuckle of the Detroit Shock and Nicky Anosike of the Minnesota Lynx.

== Career statistics ==
Legend
GP	Games played	GS	Games started	MPG	Minutes per game	RPG	Rebounds per game
APG	Assists per game	SPG	Steals per game	BPG	Blocks per game	PPG	Points per game
TO	Turnovers per game	FG%	Field-goal percentage	3P%	3-point field-goal percentage	FT%	Free-throw percentage
**Bold**	Career best	°	League leader

=== WNBA ===
==== Regular season ====
Year	Team	GP	GS	MPG	FG%	3P%	FT%	RPG	APG	SPG	BPG	TO	PPG
2008	Los Angeles	26	**17**	**21.2**	27.6	28.2	72.7	**2.5**	**3.5**	**1.0**	0.0	2.4	**4.1**
2009	Los Angeles	**33**	3	10.7	30.6	21.6	**84.6**	1.0	1.4	0.5	0.0	**0.8**	2.2
2010	Did not play (waived)												
2011	Indiana	31	3	14.2	**35.7**	**38.6**	76.7	1.3	1.7	**1.0**	0.0	1.2	3.9
2012	Washington	28	5	14.9	33.0	22.5	61.1	1.2	2.6	0.5	**0.1**	1.3	2.8
Career	4 years, 3 teams	118	28	14.9	31.6	28.1	73.5	1.4	2.2	0.7	0.0	1.4	3.2

==== Playoffs ====
Year	Team	GP	GS	MPG	FG%	3P%	FT%	RPG	APG	SPG	BPG	TO	PPG
2008	Los Angeles	**6**	**6**	**21.2**	**25.0**	**31.6**	25.0	**1.5**	**3.0**	**0.8**	0.0	1.3	**4.5**
2009	Los Angeles	3	0	3.7	0.0	0.0	0.0	0.3	0.0	0.0	0.0	**0.3**	0.0
2011	Indiana	**6**	0	11.5	18.8	0.0	**50.0**	0.7	2.0	0.5	**0.2**	1.0	1.2
Career	3 years, 2 teams	15	6	13.8	21.7	23.1	33.3	0.9	2.0	0.5	0.1	1.0	2.3

=== College ===
Legend
GP	Games played	GS	Games started	MPG	Minutes per game
FG%	Field goal percentage	3P%	3-point field goal percentage	FT%	Free throw percentage
RPG	Rebounds per game	APG	Assists per game	SPG	Steals per game
BPG	Blocks per game	PPG	Points per game	**Bold**	Career high

Year	Team	GP	Points	FG%	3P%	FT%	RPG	APG	SPG	BPG	PPG
2006-07	Tennessee	36	314	37.0	**41.3**	79.0	1.6	2.7	1.4	-	8.7
2007-08	Tennessee	**38**	**377**	**40.4**	40.0	**81.0**	**2.9**	**3.3**	**1.7**	**0.1**	**9.9**
Career	Tennessee	74	1535	38.8	40.6	80.0	2.3	3.0	1.6	0.1	9.3

== WNBA ==
Bobbitt was the 15th pick in the 2008 WNBA draft on April 9, as the Sparks made her the first pick in the second round. Bobbitt joins teammate Candace Parker and former college teammate Sidney Spencer on the Los Angeles squad, which also features Olympian Lisa Leslie.

On July 22, 2008, Bobbitt and her teammates were involved in a skirmish with the Detroit Shock. The fight broke out at The Palace of Auburn Hills with 4.6 seconds left in the game, the game ended with the LA Sparks winning. The WNBA suspended a total of 10 players and Detroit assistant coach Rick Mahorn. Bobbitt received an in-game technical and was later suspended two games for leaving the bench.

She played for Botas in Turkey during the 2008–09 WNBA off-season. On May 14, 2010, The Sparks waived Shannon Bobbitt.
