= Jeanette Pohlen-Mavunga =

American basketball player and coach (born 1989)

Jeanette Pohlen
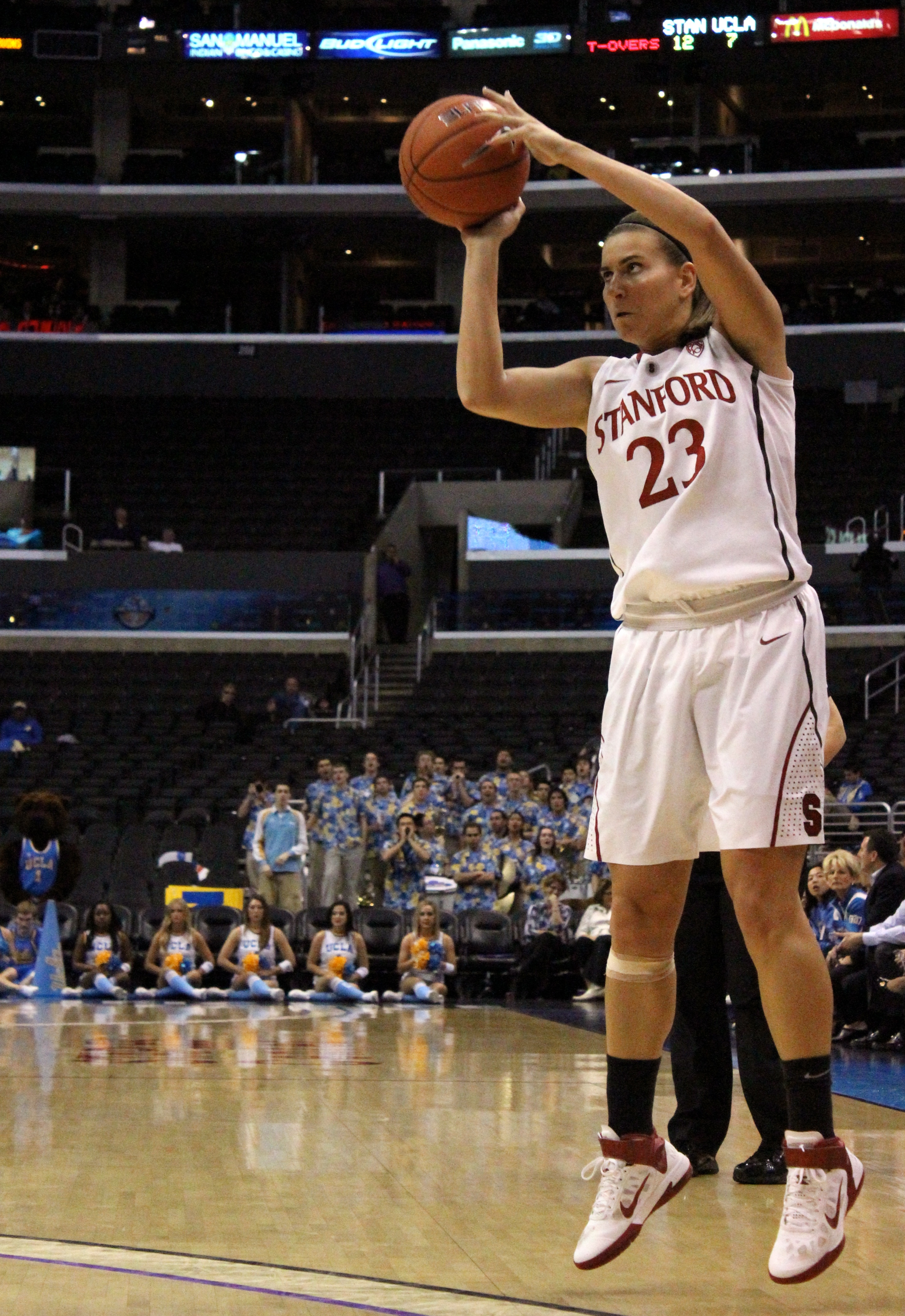
- Pohlen in 2011

Stanford Cardinal
- Title: Assistant coach
- Conference: Atlantic Coast Conference

Personal information
- Born: May 2, 1989 (age 37) Downey, California, U.S.
- Listed height: 6 ft 0 in (1.83 m)
- Listed weight: 171 lb (78 kg)

Career information
- High school: Brea Olinda (Brea, California)
- College: Stanford (2007–2011)
- WNBA draft: 2011: 1st round, 9th overall pick
- Drafted by: Indiana Fever
- Playing career: 2011–2018
- Position: Point guard

Career history

Playing
- 2011–2013: Indiana Fever
- 2011–2012: Tarsus Belediyesi
- 2015–2017: Indiana Fever

Coaching
- 2024–present: Stanford (assistant)

Career highlights
- WNBA champion (2012); First-team All-American – AP (2011); All-American – USBWA (2011); Pac-10 Player of the Year (2011); 3× All Pac-10 (2009–2011); McDonald's All-American (2007)
- Stats at WNBA.com
- Stats at Basketball Reference
Medals
Women's basketball
Representing United States
World University Games
Gold medal – first place	2009 Belgrade	Team

Jeanette Pohlen (born May 2, 1989) is an American former professional basketball player and current coach. As a collegiate athlete recruited by Stanford University, she was known by Cardinal fans for her great play against the Huskies of the University of Connecticut when she scored 31 points leading Stanford to victory over the undefeated Huskies. Born in Downey, California, Pohlen appeared in 4 straight Final Fours at Stanford; including two Championship games. Pohlen captured her first gold medal in international competition as a member of the USA Basketball World University Games Team in July 2009.

== Stanford statistics ==
Legend
GP	Games played	GS	Games started	MPG	Minutes per game
FG%	Field goal percentage	3P%	3-point field goal percentage	FT%	Free throw percentage
RPG	Rebounds per game	APG	Assists per game	SPG	Steals per game
BPG	Blocks per game	PPG	Points per game	**Bold**	Career high

Year	Team	GP	Points	FG%	3P%	FT%	RPG	APG	SPG	BPG	PPG
2007–08	Stanford	**39**	178	43.0	26.9	82.8	2.9	1.9	0.7	0.2	4.6
2008–09	Stanford	38	407	40.3	37.4	68.4	3.8	3.8	1.2	0.4	10.7
2009–10	Stanford	37	345	38.5	37.0	**89.5**	2.9	4.5	1.2	**0.5**	9.3
2010–11	Stanford	36	**523**	**43.6**	**41.7**	89.3	**3.2**	**4.8**	**1.3**	0.3	**14.5**
Career		150	1453	41.3	37.7	81.3	3.2	3.7	1.1	0.3	9.7

== USA Basketball ==
Pohlen was named a member of the team representing the US at the 2009 World University Games held in Belgrade, Serbia. The team won all seven games to earn the gold medal. Pohlen averaged 5.0 points per game.

== WNBA ==
Pohlen was selected in the first round of the 2011 WNBA draft (9th overall) by the Indiana Fever. Recognized for her long range shooting, Pohlen led the league in three point shooting percentage in 2011.

In 2012, Pohlen won her first WNBA championship with the Fever after they defeated the Minnesota Lynx in the Finals. In 2014, Pohlen was waived by the Fever during training camp due to an achilles injury.

In 2015, she rejoined the Fever after recovery.

In 2016, Pohlen was waived once again by the Fever a week before the start of the season. Midway through the season, she returned to the Fever signing a 7-day contract on July 6, 2016. A week later she signed another 7-day contract with the Fever. On July 21, 2016, she re-signed with the Fever for the rest of the season.

In February 2017, Pohlen re-signed with the Fever.

In February 2018, Pohlen re-signed once again with the Fever. In May 2018, Pohlen was waived by the Fever before the start of the 2018 WNBA season.

== WNBA statistics ==
Legend
GP	Games played	GS	Games started	MPG	Minutes per game	RPG	Rebounds per game
APG	Assists per game	SPG	Steals per game	BPG	Blocks per game	PPG	Points per game
TO	Turnovers per game	FG%	Field-goal percentage	3P%	3-point field-goal percentage	FT%	Free-throw percentage
**Bold**	Career best	°	League leader

†	Denotes seasons in which Pohlen won a WNBA championship

=== Regular season ===
Year	Team	GP	GS	MPG	FG%	3P%	FT%	RPG	APG	SPG	BPG	TO	PPG
2011	Indiana	**34**	2	15.9	.471	.468°	.867	1.4	1.0	0.4	0.1	0.6	4.1
2012^{†}	Indiana	**34**	**3**	**16.9**	.430	.421	.700	1.7	**1.1**	**0.6**	**0.3**	0.9	**4.4**
2013	Indiana	13	0	14.7	.342	.375	**1.000**	**1.9**	0.3	0.5	0.1	0.8	3.2
2015	Indiana	26	1	10.0	.404	.395	.750	0.8	0.6	0.5	0.0	0.4	2.4
2016	Indiana	12	0	4.1	**.545**	**.500**	**1.000**	0.1	0.4	0.0	0.0	**0.2**	1.3
2017	Indiana	29	0	12.9	.405	.385	.826	1.0	0.7	0.2	0.0	0.6	3.4
Career	6 years, 1 team	148	6	13.4	.427	.420	.825	1.2	0.8	0.4	0.1	0.6	3.4

=== Playoffs ===
Year	Team	GP	GS	MPG	FG%	3P%	FT%	RPG	APG	SPG	BPG	TO	PPG
2011	Indiana	5	0	7.0	.500	.500	.000	0.8	**0.6**	0.2	0.0	**0.2**	2.0
2012^{†}	Indiana	**6**	0	**11.5**	**.778**	**1.000**	.000	0.7	0.3	**0.5**	0.0	0.8	**3.2**
2013	Indiana	3	0	11.1	.308	.111	.000	**1.0**	0.3	0.0	**0.3**	0.3	3.0
2015	Indiana	6	0	4.5	.000	.000	.000	0.2	0.2	0.0	0.0	0.0	0.0
Career	4 years, 1 team	20	0	8.2	.441	.364	.000	0.6	0.4	0.2	0.1	0.4	1.9

== Overseas ==
Pohlen played the 2011–12 season with Tarsus in Turkey. She averaged 10.1 points in 13 games with the team.

== Personal life ==
Pohlen has an uncle who played football at the University of Notre Dame, both her grandfather and great-grandfather played basketball at Purdue University and her great-uncle is inducted into the Texas A&M Basketball Hall of Fame.
