= FanDuel Sports Network Indiana =

American regional sports network

- Country: United States
- Broadcast area: Central Indiana; Nationwide (via DirecTV; games only)
- Network: FanDuel Sports Network
- Headquarters: St. Louis, Missouri

Programming
- Language: English
- Picture format: 720p (HDTV); 480i (SDTV)

Ownership
- Owner: Main Street Sports Group
- Sister channels: FanDuel Sports Network Midwest

History
- Launched: November 1, 2006 (19 years ago)
- Replaced: Fox Sports Midwest (within designated broadcast area)
- Closed: September 30, 2026 (6 days ago)
- Replaced by: Pacers - DAZN
- Former names: FSN Indiana (2006–2008); Fox Sports Indiana (2008–2021); Bally Sports Indiana (2021-2024)

Links
- Website: www.fanduelsportsnetwork.com

FanDuel Sports Network Indiana was an American regional sports network owned by Main Street Sports Group (formerly Diamond Sports Group), and operated as an affiliate of FanDuel Sports Network. The channel broadcast local professional and high school sports coverage throughout the state of Indiana, with a focus on professional sports teams based in Indianapolis, namely the NBA's Indiana Pacers.

The channel was available on cable providers throughout Central Indiana, and is also available nationwide on DirecTV.

== History ==
Fox Sports Indiana logo, used from 2008 to 2012.

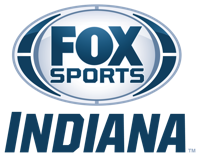
Former Fox Spots Indiana logo, used from 2012 to 2021

FanDuel Sports Network was launched as FSN Indiana was launched on November 1, 2006, as a spin-off channel of Fox Sports Midwest, after the regional sports network obtained the exclusive regional cable television rights to broadcast games from the Indiana Pacers NBA franchise. The first live sporting event broadcast on FSN Indiana featured the Pacers at the Charlotte Bobcats on the day of launch at 7PM. The game was preceded by the special Beyond the Glory:Reggie Miller and a one-hour pregame show.

A high definition simulcast feed of Fox Sports Indiana, launched on December 17, 2007, which broadcasts in the 720p format. Originally, the channel broadcast most of its Pacers game telecasts as well as Cincinnati Reds games from Fox Sports Ohio, and games and events broadcast nationally by Fox Sports Networks in HD. Today, nearly all programming is in HD.

On October 16, 2009, Dish Network removed Fox Sports Indiana and sister networks Fox Sports Midwest and Fox Sports Kansas City in a carriage dispute over a proposed increase in retransmission consent revenue paid by the satellite provider. The dispute lasted for one year, with all three channels being restored on October 29, 2010, through the signing of a new carriage agreement.

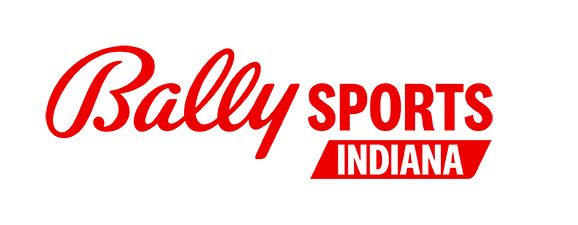
Former Bally Sports Indiana logo, used from 2021 to 2024

On December 14, 2017, as part of a merger between both companies, The Walt Disney Company announced plans to acquire all 22 regional Fox Sports networks from 21st Century Fox, including Fox Sports Indiana. However, on June 27, 2018, the Justice Department ordered their divestment under antitrust grounds, citing Disney's ownership of ESPN. On May 3, 2019, Sinclair Broadcast Group and Entertainment Studios (through their joint venture, Diamond Holdings) bought Fox Sports Networks from The Walt Disney Company for $10.6 billion. The deal closed on August 22, 2019. On November 17, 2020, Sinclair announced an agreement with casino operator Bally's Corporation to serve as a new naming rights partner for the FSN channels. Sinclair announced the new Bally Sports branding for the channels on January 27, 2021. On March 31, 2021, coinciding with the start of the 2021 Major League Baseball season, Fox Sports Indiana was rebranded as Bally Sports Indiana, resulting in 18 other Regional Sports Networks renamed Bally Sports in their respective regions. The first live sporting event shown on Bally Sports Indiana was the Pacers-Heat game at 7 PM on that day. It was preceded by the "Pacers Live" pregame show at 6:30 PM.

On March 14, 2023, Diamond Sports filed for Chapter 11 Bankruptcy.

On October 16, 2024, it was revealed in a court filing that Diamond had reached a new sponsorship agreement with FanDuel Group, under which it intended to rebrand Bally Sports as the FanDuel Sports Network; on October 18, 2024, Diamond officially announced the rebranding, which took effect October 21. Under the agreement, FanDuel has the option to take a minority equity stake of up to 5% once Diamond Sports exits bankruptcy. The branding is downplayed during programming related to high school sports.

== Programming ==
FanDuel Sports Network Indiana holds the regional cable television rights to the Indiana Pacers. The channel also broadcasts select Major League Baseball games from its sister regional networks, airing Cincinnati Reds games televised by FanDuel Sports Network Ohio, St. Louis Cardinals game telecasts originating from FanDuel Sports Network Midwest and Detroit Tigers games from FanDuel Sports Network Detroit to areas of the state within the home television territories of those teams as defined by Major League Baseball.

FanDuel Sports Network Indiana also broadcasts athletic events from the Missouri Valley Conference and Indiana High School Athletic Association.

On December 10, 2016, FanDuel Sports Network Indiana, then Fox Sports Indiana aired the first edition of Basketball Day Indiana, which comprised several high school, college and professional basketball games featuring Indiana-based teams. The event was broadcast annually until 2021.

Region served	MLB			NBA		NHL
Region served	Cincinnati Reds (FanDuel Sports Network Ohio)	Detroit Tigers (FanDuel Sports Network Detroit)	St. Louis Cardinals (FanDuel Sports Network Midwest)	Indiana Pacers	Detroit Pistons (FanDuel Sports Network Detroit)	St. Louis Blues (FanDuel Sports Network Midwest)
Central Indiana	Yes	No	No	Yes	No	Yes
Southwest Indiana	Yes	No	Yes	Yes	No	Yes
Fort Wayne	Yes	Yes	No	Yes	Yes	Yes

=== Former Programming ===
FanDuel Sports Network Indiana previously had rights to the Indiana Fever of the WNBA. It has carried telecasts of events and conference magazine programs from the Atlantic 10 Conference, Atlantic Coast Conference, Big East Conference, Big 12 Conference, Conference USA, Western Athletic Conference, and Horizon League. Additionally, it aired weekly magazine programs for Notre Dame's football and men's basketball teams.

== Notable on-air staff ==
=== Indiana Pacers ===
- Chris Denari – Pacers play-by-play
- Quinn Buckner – Pacers analyst
- Eddie Gill – Pacers analyst (home games)
- Jeremiah Johnson – Pacers reporter

=== Indiana Fever ===
- Pat Boylan – Fever play-by-play
- Debbie Antonelli – Fever analyst
