= 2011 WNBA season =

- League: Women's National Basketball Association
- Sport: Basketball
- Duration: June 3 – October 7, 2011
- Games: 34
- Teams: 12
- Total attendance: 1,622,685
- Average attendance: 7,954
- TV partner(s): ABC, ESPN, NBA TV

Draft
- Top draft pick: (United States) Maya Moore
- Picked by: Minnesota Lynx

Regular season
- Top seed: Minnesota Lynx
- Season MVP: (United States) Tamika Catchings (Indiana)
- Top scorer: (United States) Diana Taurasi (Phoenix)

Playoffs
- Finals champions: Minnesota Lynx
- Runners-up: Atlanta Dream
- Finals MVP: (United States) Seimone Augustus (Minnesota)

WNBA seasons
- ← 2010 2012 →

The 2011 WNBA season was the 15th season of the Women's National Basketball Association. The regular season began on June 3 with the Los Angeles Sparks hosting the Minnesota Lynx, featuring 2011 WNBA draft top pick Maya Moore, in a game televised on NBA TV. Four games followed the next day, with the marquee matchup, televised on ABC, featuring the defending champion Seattle Storm and the Phoenix Mercury in Seattle.

The Minnesota Lynx finished the regular season with the best record in the league at 27-7, and were the top seed in the Western Conference. The Indiana Fever were the top seed in the Eastern Conference. The Lynx ultimately advanced to face the Atlanta Dream in the 2011 WNBA Finals.

== 2010–2011 WNBA offseason ==
- The new television deal with ESPN continued during the 2011 season (runs 2009–2016). For the first time ever, teams will be paid rights fees as part of this deal.
- As of the 2009 season, the maximum roster size per team was reduced from 13 to 11. Any team that falls below nine players able to play due to injury, pregnancy or any other factor outside of the control of the team will, upon request, be granted a roster hardship exception allowing the team to sign an additional player or players so that the team will have nine players able to play in an upcoming game or games. As soon as the injured (or otherwise sidelined) player(s) is able to play, the roster hardship player(s) – not any other player on the roster—must be waived.
- On October 12, 2010, the New York Liberty named former Monarchs coach John Whisenant head coach and general manager.
- On October 29, 2010, Pokey Chatman was named head coach and general manager of the Chicago Sky.
- On November 1, 2010, the Washington Mystics announced that Julie Plank (head coach) and Angela Taylor (GM) would not be returning to the team and that Trudi Lacey would take over head coach and GM positions.
- On December 3, 2010, Donna Orender, six-year league president, announced her resignation effective December 31.
- On January 11, 2011, The San Antonio Silver Stars announced that Dan Hughes would resume head coaching duties.
- The Washington Mystics announced a marquee sponsorship with Inova Health System on April 7, 2011. This marked the fifth team in the league to allow a sponsor to brand their uniforms.
- On draft day, Adidas introduced the Revolution 30 technology, to be used on all WNBA team uniforms. The uniforms are 30% lighter than before and also enable moisture management. Unlike their NBA and NBA D-League counterparts, however, all WNBA uniforms underwent complete redesigns.
- NBA Commissioner David Stern announced on April 21, 2011 that Laurel J. Richie would assume role as president of the WNBA on May 16.
- The New York Liberty will play home games for the next three seasons at Prudential Center in Newark, New Jersey, due to summer renovations at Madison Square Garden.

== Marquee sponsorship ==
On August 22, 2011, the WNBA announced a league-wide marquee sponsorship with Boost Mobile. The deal would allow the Boost Mobile logo to be placed on ten of the 12 teams' jerseys (excluding Phoenix and San Antonio) in addition to branding on the courts and in arenas. A source said the deal is worth "roughly $10 million over its four years" and is the richest in league history.

== Draft ==
The WNBA Draft lottery was held on November 2, 2010. The lottery teams were the Tulsa Shock, Minnesota Lynx, Chicago Sky and Minnesota Lynx (from Conn.). The top pick was awarded to Minnesota.

The 2011 WNBA Draft was held on April 11, 2011, in Bristol, Connecticut. Coverage of the first round was shown on ESPN (HD). Second and third round coverage was shown on ESPNU and NBA TV.

The top picks were:

1. Maya Moore, Minnesota Lynx
2. Elizabeth Cambage, Tulsa Shock
3. Courtney Vandersloot, Chicago Sky
4. Amber Harris, Minnesota Lynx (from Conn.)

== Regular season ==
=== Standings ===
Eastern Conference	W	L	PCT	GB	Home	Road	Conf.
Indiana Fever ^{x}	21	13	.618	–	13–4	8–9	13–9
Connecticut Sun ^{x}	21	13	.618	–	15–2	6–11	14–8
Atlanta Dream ^{x}	20	14	.588	1.0	11–6	9–8	14–8
New York Liberty ^{x}	19	15	.559	2.0	12-5	7–10	11–11
Chicago Sky ^{o}	14	20	.412	7.0	10–7	4–13	10–12
Washington Mystics ^{o}	6	28	.176	15.0	4–13	2–15	4–18

Western Conference	W	L	PCT	GB	Home	Road	Conf.
Minnesota Lynx ^{x}	27	7	.794	–	14–3	13–4	18–4
Seattle Storm ^{x}	21	13	.618	6.0	15–2	6–11	15–7
Phoenix Mercury ^{x}	19	15	.559	8.0	11–6	8–9	11–11
San Antonio Silver Stars ^{x}	18	16	.529	9.0	9–8	9–8	11–11
Los Angeles Sparks ^{o}	15	19	.441	12.0	10–7	5–12	10–12
Tulsa Shock ^{o}	3	31	.088	24.0	2–15	1–16	1–21

=== All-Star Game ===
The 2011 WNBA All-Star Game was hosted by the San Antonio Silver Stars on July 23 at the AT&T Center. Coverage of the game began at 3:30pm (ET) on ABC. This marks the first time the Silver Stars have hosted the annual event. This is only the second time in league history that the showcase was played on the court of a Western Conference team.

ABC (HD)

July 23
3:30 pm EDT

Report

East 118, West 113
Scoring by quarter: 33–36, 32–30, 27–26, 26–21
Pts: Cappie Pondexter (17); Rebs: Angel McCoughtry (10); Asts: Cappie Pondexter (7)	Pts: Swin Cash (21); Rebs: Swin Cash (12); Asts: Diana Taurasi (7)

AT&T Center, San Antonio, Texas
Attendance: 12,540
Referees:
#4 Sue Blauch
#17 Scott Twardoski
#45 Tom Mauer

=== Statistic leaders ===
The following shows the leaders for each statistic during the 2011 regular season.

Category	Player	Team	Statistic
Points per game	Diana Taurasi	Phoenix Mercury	21.6 PPG
Rebounds per game	Tina Charles	Connecticut Sun	11.0 RPG
Assists per game	Lindsay Whalen	Minnesota Lynx	5.9 APG
Steals per game	Sancho Lyttle	Atlanta Dream	2.36 SPG
Blocks per game	Sylvia Fowles	Chicago Sky	2.00 BPG
Field goal percentage	Sylvia Fowles	Chicago Sky	59.1% (263–445)
Three point FG percentage	Jeanette Pohlen	Indiana Fever	46.8% (29–62)
Free throw percentage	DeWanna Bonner	Phoenix Mercury	90.9% (90–99)
Points per game	Team Stat	Phoenix Mercury	88.97 PPG
Least points allowed	Team Stat	Seattle Storm	69.85 PPG
Field goal percentage	Team Stat	Phoenix Mercury	46.1%
Least FG% allowed	Team Stat	Minnesota Lynx	41.3%

=== Schedule ===
2011 WNBA preseason
May

Date	Time (ET)	Matchup			TV	Result	High points	High rebounds	High assists	Location/Attendance
Thu 19	7:00	China	@	Connecticut		101-63; CON	Yuan (17)	Charles (10)	Banban; Montgomery (6)	Mohegan Sun Arena; 4,666
Mon 23	12:30	China	@	Chicago		84-45; CHI	Fowles (18)	Song (9)	Vandersloot (7)	Trinity International University; 972
Tue 24	1:00	Indiana	@	Minnesota		71-66; MIN	Brunson; Douglas (11)	Harris (10)	January (7)	Concordia University; 2,055
Tue 24	10:00	Japan	@	Phoenix		96-52; PHO	Gray-Lawson (16)	Dupree (8)	Gray-Lawson (6)	US Airways Center; 2,969
Wed 25	10:30am	Washington	@	New York		60-57; WAS	Anosike (14)	Melvin (6)	Miller (5)	Prudential Center; 6,472
Wed 25	3:00	Seattle	@	Los Angeles		71-66; LAS	Parker (17)	3 players (6)	Wright (7)	Torodome; 3,212
Wed 25	7:00	San Antonio	@	Connecticut		80-56; SAN	White (15)	Charles (17)	Hammon (6)	Mohegan Sun Arena; 4,801
Thu 26	11:30am	Chicago	@	Washington		66-55; WAS	Langhorne (15)	Langhorne (9)	Prince (4)	Verizon Center; 9,502
Fri 27	7:00	China	@	New York		79-65; NYL	Pondexter	Breland	N/A	Times Union Center; N/A
Fri 27	7:00	San Antonio	@	Connecticut		75-73; CON	Charles (17)	Charles (11)	Robinson (6)	Mohegan Sun Arena at Casey Plaza; 2,139
Sat 28	9:00	Phoenix	@	Los Angeles		83-72; LAS	Milton-Jones (14)	Braxton; Milton-Jones (6)	Lavender; Penicheiro (4)	The Pit; N/A
Sun 29	12:00	Atlanta	@	Great Britain	NBA TV	82-51; ATL	Miller (21)	Irvin (8)	Harding (5)	Manchester Evening News Arena; N/A
Sun 29	5:00	Tulsa	@	Seattle		76-70; SEA	Holt (25)	Cambage; Jackson (8)	Bird (8)	KeyArena; 4,979
Tue 31	7:00	Minnesota	@	Indiana		76-70; MIN	Douglas (15)	McWilliams-Franklin (8)	Wiggins (4)	Conseco Fieldhouse; 3,817

2011 WNBA regular season
June

Date	Time (ET)	Matchup			TV	Result	High points	High rebounds	High assists	Location/Attendance
Fri 3	11:00	Minnesota	@	Los Angeles	NBA TV; PRIME	82-74; LAS	Moore (21)	Brunson (12)	Whalen (5)	Staples Center; 13,589
Sat 4	3:00	Phoenix	@	Seattle	ABC	78-71; SEA	Taurasi (31)	Braxton; Dupree; Little (9)	Bird (10)	KeyArena; 11,548
Sat 4	7:00	Washington	@	Connecticut		89-73; CON	Charles (18)	Anosike; Jones (7)	Ajavon; Lawson; Miller (4)	Mohegan Sun Arena; 6,666
Sat 4	7:00	Chicago	@	Indiana	CN100; FS-I	65-57; IND	Prince (20)	Catchings (9)	Vandersloot (7)	Conseco Fieldhouse; 8,024
Sat 4	8:00	Tulsa	@	San Antonio	COX	93-73; SAN	Young (20)	Cambage (10)	Hammon; Hodges; Robinson (5)	AT&T Center; 12,406
Sun 5	3:00	New York	@	Atlanta	SSO	94-88 (OT); NYL	Pierson (25)	Lyttle (11)	Pondexter (11)	Philips Arena; 8,038
Sun 5	3:30	Los Angeles	@	Minnesota	PRIME; FS-N	86-69; MIN	Augustus (17)	Brunson (15)	Whalen (7)	Target Center; 10,123
Tue 7	8:00	Tulsa	@	Minnesota		75-65; MIN	Brunson (17)	Brunson; Cambage (15)	Whalen (4)	Target Center; 7,713
Thu 9	7:00	Washington	@	Atlanta	ESPN2	98-90 (OT); WAS	Langhorne (30)	de Souza (15)	Castro Marques; K. Miller (5)	Philips Arena; 5,020
Thu 9	10:00	Minnesota	@	Seattle		81-74; MIN	Bird (24)	Brunson (15)	Whalen (10)	KeyArena; 6,291
Fri 10	7:00	New York	@	Indiana		81-80; NYL	Douglas (27)	Vaughn (9)	Powell (4)	Conseco Fieldhouse; 7,703
Fri 10	8:00	San Antonio	@	Tulsa		93-62; SAN	Hodges (19)	Phillips (8)	Hammon (5)	BOK Center; 7,509
Fri 10	8:30	Connecticut	@	Chicago	CN100	78-75; CHI	Fowles (23)	Fowles (13)	Prince (7)	Allstate Arena; 6,609
Fri 10	10:30	Phoenix	@	Los Angeles		98-84; LAS	Parker (22)	Dupree (11)	Johnson (6)	Staples Center; 10,616
Sat 11	7:00	Indiana	@	New York	MSG	86-80; IND	Carson (23)	Davenport (8)	Powell (5)	Prudential Center; 7,835
Sat 11	7:00	Chicago	@	Washington	CN100	84-77; CHI	Ajavon (24)	Snow (8)	Canty (6)	Verizon Center; 11,943
Sat 11	8:00	Atlanta	@	San Antonio		86-74; SAN	Adams (32)	de Souza (14)	Hammon (8)	AT&T Center; 9,140
Sun 12	3:00	Tulsa	@	Connecticut		90-79; CON	Latta (26)	Charles (8)	Montgomery (7)	Mohegan Sun Arena; 6,520
Tue 14	7:00	Atlanta	@	New York		79-58; ATL	Carson (21)	Carson (8)	Lehning (6)	Prudential Center; 5,725
Tue 14	7:00	Tulsa	@	Indiana	ESPN2	82-74; IND	Douglas (22)	Jackson (11)	January (10)	Conseco Fieldhouse; 6,024
Thu 16	7:00	Connecticut	@	Washington	CSN-MA	79-71; CON	Charles (26)	Anosike (13)	Miller; Montgomery (5)	Verizon Center; 7,028
Fri 17	8:00	Atlanta	@	Minnesota		96-85; MIN	McCoughtry (27)	Brunson (14)	Whalen (8)	Target Center; 7,556
Fri 17	8:30	New York	@	Chicago	CN100	85-73; CHI	Fowles (27)	Fowles (11)	Prince (8)	Allstate Arena; 5,718
Fri 17	10:00	San Antonio	@	Phoenix	FS-A	101-99; SAN	Young (26)	Dupree (12)	Taylor (10)	US Airways Center; 12,274
Fri 17	10:00	Indiana	@	Seattle		68-54; SEA	Cash (14)	Catchings (14)	Cash (5)	KeyArena; 8,178
Sat 18	8:00	Washington	@	Tulsa		77-59; TUL	Latta (22)	Langhorne (12)	Pedersen (7)	BOK Center; 4,423
Sun 19	1:00	Chicago	@	Connecticut		83-68; CON	Charles (31)	Charles; Fowles (12)	Vandersloot (6)	Mohegan Sun Arena; 6,875
Sun 19	3:00	Minnesota	@	Atlanta	SSO	77-64; MIN	Augustus (19)	de Souza; McWilliams-Franklin (12)	Moore; Whalen (5)	Philips Arena; 7,274
Sun 19	6:00	Indiana	@	Phoenix		93-89 (OT); PHO	Taurasi (32)	Dupree (18)	Bobbitt; January; Taylor (6)	US Airways Center; 7,701
Sun 19	8:30	Seattle	@	Los Angeles	PRIME	74-50; LAS	Bird (15)	Little (8)	Toliver (5)	Staples Center; 9,119
Tue 21	12:00	Chicago	@	Atlanta	SSO	71-68; ATL	Fowles (21)	Snow (12)	Harding; Vandersloot (6)	Philips Arena; 6,154
Tue 21	7:00	Indiana	@	Washington	CSN-MA	89-80; IND	Langhorne (23)	Langhorne (9)	January (9)	Verizon Center; 7,980
Tue 21	8:00	Phoenix	@	San Antonio	ESPN2	105-98; PHO	Taylor (30)	Dupree (13)	Hammon; D. Robinson (7)	AT&T Center; 7,072
Tue 21	8:00	Seattle	@	Tulsa		82-77; SEA	Bird (21)	T. Jackson (10)	Bird (6)	BOK Center; 4,612
Tue 21	10:00	New York	@	Los Angeles	ESPN2	96-91; LAS	Milton-Jones (27)	Parker (13)	Toliver (7)	Staples Center; 10,389
Thu 23	12:30	New York	@	Tulsa		94-82; NYL	Vaughn (24)	Vaughn (12)	Pondexter (10)	BOK Center; 4,682
Thu 23	8:00	Connecticut	@	Chicago	CN100	107-101 (2OT); CHI	Montgomery (33)	Snow (17)	Vandersloot (10)	Allstate Arena; 3,319
Fri 24	7:30	Phoenix	@	Atlanta	FS-A; FS-S	92-83; PHO	McCoughtry (24)	Taylor (10)	Taylor (8)	Philips Arena; 5,492
Fri 24	8:00	Los Angeles	@	San Antonio		90-80 (OT); SAN	Perkins (31)	Parker (13)	Hammon (9)	AT&T Center; 8,617
Fri 24	10:00	Minnesota	@	Seattle	KONG	65-55; SEA	Augustus (17)	Cash (9)	Bird (8)	KeyArena; 7,914
Sat 25	7:00	Connecticut	@	Indiana	NBA TV; CSN-NE	75-70; IND	Montgomery (19)	Catchings (12)	Montgomery (6)	Conseco Fieldhouse; 7,100
Sat 25	8:00	Phoenix	@	Chicago	CN100	86-78; PHO	Fowles (28)	Fowles (11)	Taylor (7)	Allstate Arena; 5,547
Sun 26	3:00	San Antonio	@	Atlanta	NBA TV; SSO	92-86; SAN	Perkins (25)	Paris (11)	Hammon (6)	Philips Arena; 5,718
Sun 26	4:00	Los Angeles	@	New York		77-67; NYL	Pondexter (22)	Parker (11)	Pondexter (5)	Prudential Center; 7,625
Sun 26	4:00	Tulsa	@	Washington	CSN-MA	83-63; WAS	Langhorne (23)	Coleman (12)	Ajavon (6)	Verizon Center; 10,675
Sun 26	7:00	Indiana	@	Minnesota	NBA TV; FS-N	78-75; IND	Douglas (22)	Brunson (11)	January; Whalen (4)	Target Center; 7,117
Tue 28	7:00	Phoenix	@	Indiana		91-86; IND	Douglas (26)	Braxton (7)	Catchings (7)	Conseco Fieldhouse; 6,625
Tue 28	8:00	Los Angeles	@	Connecticut	ESPN2	79-76; CON	Charles (22)	Charles (23)	4 players (5)	Mohegan Sun Arena; 6,515
Tue 28	8:00	San Antonio	@	Chicago	CN100	84-74; SAN	Prince; Young (19)	Fowles (12)	Hammon (5)	Allstate Arena; 3,894
Thu 30	7:30	New York	@	Atlanta	SSO	87-81; ATL	de Souza (27)	de Souza (15)	Pondexter (5)	Philips Arena; 4,423
Thu 30	8:00	Minnesota	@	Tulsa		101-71; MIN	Whalen (21)	McWilliams-Franklin (9)	Pedersen; Whalen (5)	BOK Center; 3,970

July

Date	Time (ET)	Matchup			TV	Result	High points	High rebounds	High assists	Location/Attendance
Fri 1	7:00	San Antonio	@	New York	NBA TV	81-75; NYL	Adams; Pondexter (19)	Young (8)	Hammon; Pondexter (5)	Prudential Center; 6,714
Fri 1	7:30	Seattle	@	Connecticut	CSN-NE	75-70; CON	Cash (25)	Charles (10)	Montgomery (8)	Mohegan Sun Arena; 7,748
Fri 1	10:00	Chicago	@	Phoenix	NBA TV; CN100	94-84; PHO	Taurasi (24)	Dupree (9)	Prince; Taurasi (6)	US Airways Center; 9,517
Sun 3	4:00	Seattle	@	Washington	NBA TV; CSN-MA	73-63; SEA	Cash; Dunlap (19)	Anosike (10)	Bird (5)	Verizon Center; 11,604
Tue 5	7:00	Seattle	@	Indiana	FS-I	78-61; IND	Davenport (15)	Anosike (10)	Phillips (6)	Conseco Fieldhouse; 6,525
Tue 5	8:00	Washington	@	Chicago	CN100	78-65; CHI	Fowles (34)	Fowles (16)	Thomas; Thorn (4)	Allstate Arena; 3,187
Tue 5	9:00	Los Angeles	@	Phoenix	ESPN2	101-82; PHO	Hoffman (21)	Pringle (9)	Taurasi (7)	US Airways Center; 9,825
Fri 8	8:00	New York	@	San Antonio	NBA TV	76-73; NYL	Pondexter (20)	Pierson (10)	Pondexter (7)	AT&T Center; 8,100
Fri 8	8:00	Phoenix	@	Tulsa		86-78; PHO	Cambage (19)	Bonner (13)	Lewis (9)	BOK Center; 4,081
Sat 9	7:00	Washington	@	Indiana		68-57; IND	Phillips (14)	Coleman (9)	Catchings; Miller (4)	Conseco Fieldhouse; 7,056
Sat 9	8:00	Connecticut	@	Minnesota	NBA TV; FS-N	90-67; MIN	Moore (26)	Brunson; McWilliams-Franklin (10)	Whalen (8)	Target Center; 8,205
Sat 9	8:00	Atlanta	@	Chicago	CN100	81-69; CHI	Prince (24)	Fowles (12)	Vandersloot (9)	Allstate Arena; 5,679
Sat 9	10:00	Los Angeles	@	Seattle	NBA TV; KONG	99-80; SEA	Cash (26)	Lavender (9)	Bird (8)	KeyArena; 9,686
Sun 10	4:00	Chicago	@	New York	NBA TV; CN100; MSG+	80-73; NYL	Carson; Pondexter (18)	Fowles; Powell (8)	Pondexter; Powell (4)	Prudential Center; 7,315
Sun 10	6:00	Tulsa	@	Phoenix	NBA TV; COX	102-63; PHO	Jackson (19)	Pedersen; Sanford (7)	Taurasi (6)	US Airways Center; 7,696
Tue 12	3:00	Washington	@	Seattle	NBA TV	79-71; SEA	Bird (22)	Coleman (9)	Ajavon; Bird (7)	KeyArena; 13,384
Tue 12	8:00	Los Angeles	@	San Antonio	NBA TV; PRIME; FS-SW	84-74; LAS	Young (22)	Young (11)	Toliver (5)	AT&T Center; 6,769
Wed 13	12:00	Atlanta	@	New York		91-69; NYL	Powell (20)	de Souza; Powell (7)	Carson; Mitchell; Pondexter (5)	Prudential Center; 14,314
Wed 13	12:30	Tulsa	@	Chicago		72-54; CHI	Fowles (21)	Fowles (13)	Prince (6)	Allstate Arena; 13,838
Wed 13	1:00	Phoenix	@	Minnesota	NBA TV; FS-A; FS-N	112-105; PHO	Taurasi (27)	Brunson (16)	Johnson; Taurasi; Taylor (8)	Target Center; 11,820
Wed 13	1:00	Connecticut	@	Indiana		90-78; IND	Douglas (20)	Charles (11)	Catchings (7)	Conseco Fieldhouse; 9,045
Thu 14	9:00	Seattle	@	San Antonio	ESPN2	69-66; SAN	Adams (23)	Robinson; Willingham (7)	Hammon (9)	AT&T Center; 9,167
Fri 15	7:00	Connecticut	@	New York	NBA TV; CSN-NE	68-59; CON	Charles; Vaughn (15)	Vaughn (9)	Mitchell; Montgomery (4)	Prudential Center; 7,722
Fri 15	7:00	Minnesota	@	Indiana		80-70; MIN	Catchings (22)	McWilliams-Franklin (9)	Whalen (7)	Conseco Fieldhouse; 7,538
Fri 15	8:00	Los Angeles	@	Tulsa		79-74; LAS	Toliver (25)	Jackson (10)	Toliver (6)	BOK Center; 5,034
Fri 15	10:00	Washington	@	Phoenix	NBA TV; FS-A	78-64; PHO	Dupree (20)	Anosike (10)	Taylor (7)	US Airways Center; 9,075
Sat 16	7:30	Chicago	@	Atlanta	NBA TV; CN100; FS-S	76-68; ATL	McCoughtry (24)	Snow (12)	Price (10)	Philips Arena; 7,413
Sat 16	8:00	Seattle	@	Minnesota		69-62; MIN	Augustus (19)	Cash; Moore (9)	McWilliams-Franklin; Smith (4)	Target Center; 7,733
Sun 17	4:00	Tulsa	@	New York	NBA TV; MSG+	88-57; NYL	Pondexter (18)	Jackson (11)	Holt (4)	Prudential Center; 6,735
Sun 17	5:00	Indiana	@	Connecticut		76-71; CON	McCray (22)	Catchings (15)	Montgomery (7)	Mohegan Sun Arena; 7,075
Sun 17	8:30	Washington	@	Los Angeles	NBA TV	89-85 (OT); WAS	Ajavon (29)	Langhorne (14)	Toliver (7)	Staples Center; 10,398
Mon 18	10:30	San Antonio	@	Los Angeles		79-69; SAN	Hammon (26)	O'Hea (11)	Lacy (7)	Staples Center; 8,818
Tue 19	12:00	Indiana	@	Atlanta	NBA TV; SSO	84-74; ATL	Catchings (22)	de Souza (11)	Catchings (6)	Philips Arena; 7,645
Tue 19	7:00	Seattle	@	Chicago	ESPN2	78-69; CHI	Bird (26)	Robinson (10)	Vandersloot (7)	Allstate Arena; 6,026
Tue 19	7:30	New York	@	Connecticut		85-79; CON	Charles (24)	Powell (11)	Montgomery (10)	Mohegan Sun Arena; 6,096
Wed 20	11:30am	Atlanta	@	Washington	NBA TV	86-79; ATL	McCoughtry (33)	Anosike (14)	K. Miller (6)	Verizon Center; 13,954
Wed 20	3:30	Minnesota	@	Phoenix	NBA TV; FS-A	106-98; MIN	Augustus (25)	Bonner; Dupree (7)	Whalen (8)	US Airways Center; 12,118
Thu 21	7:00	Chicago	@	Indiana	NBA TV; CN100; FS-I	77-63; IND	Fowles (21)	Catchings; Davenport; Douglas (7)	Douglas (7)	Conseco Fieldhouse; 8,050
Thu 21	10:00	San Antonio	@	Seattle	NBA TV; FS-SW	73-55; SEA	Wright (17)	Cash; Robinson (9)	Bird (7)	KeyArena; 6,922
Sat 23	3:30	East	@	West	ABC	118-113; EAST	Cash (21)	Cash (12)	Pondexter; Taurasi (7)	AT&T Center; 12,540
Tue 26	7:00	San Antonio	@	Washington	CSN-MA	73-67; SAN	Hammon (22)	Appel (12)	Thomas (5)	Verizon Center; 11,331
Tue 26	8:00	Atlanta	@	Tulsa		76-68; ATL	McCoughtry (37)	Jackson (17)	5 players (3)	BOK Center; 3,435
Tue 26	8:00	Los Angeles	@	Minnesota		85-72; MIN	Toliver (28)	Hoffman; McWilliams-Franklin (9)	Whalen (7)	Target Center; 8,044
Tue 26	8:00	Connecticut	@	Chicago	CSN-NE; CN100	77-66; CON	Jones (22)	Charles (15)	Montgomery (6)	Allstate Arena; 3,091
Tue 26	10:00	Seattle	@	Phoenix	NBA TV	83-77; SEA	Taurasi (26)	Cash (8)	Bird (7)	US Airways Center; 6,108
Thu 28	12:30	Phoenix	@	San Antonio	NBA TV; FS-A; FS-SW	102-91; SAN	Hammon (33)	Dupree (14)	D. Robinson (8)	AT&T Center; 14,797
Thu 28	7:00	Washington	@	New York	MSG	75-71; NYL	Pondexter (19)	Langhorne (9)	Pierson; Pondexter (4)	Prudential Center; 6,808
Thu 28	7:00	Los Angeles	@	Atlanta	NBA TV; SSO	89-80; ATL	McCoughtry (22)	McCoughtry (11)	Penicheiro (11)	Philips Arena; 6,701
Thu 28	7:30	Indiana	@	Connecticut		69-58; IND	Catchings (16)	Charles; Davenport (10)	Bobbitt (5)	Mohegan Sun Arena; 6,329
Thu 28	8:00	Chicago	@	Tulsa		64-55; CHI	Latta (20)	Jackson (15)	Holt; Snow (5)	BOK Center; 4,012
Fri 29	7:00	Indiana	@	Washington	NBA TV; CSN-MA	61-59; IND	Ajavon (19)	Walker (10)	Catchings (5)	Verizon Center; 11,587
Fri 29	8:00	Seattle	@	Minnesota		92-67; MIN	Cash (18)	Kobryn (9)	Moore (6)	Target Center; 7,856
Sat 30	7:00	Phoenix	@	New York	NBA TV; MSG+	91-84; PHO	Taylor (29)	Vaughn (10)	Swanier (7)	Prudential Center; 7,214
Sat 30	8:00	Seattle	@	Tulsa		89-72; SEA	Bird (29)	Cash (9)	Bird (7)	BOK Center; 5,067
Sat 30	8:00	Los Angeles	@	Chicago	CN100	88-84; LAS	Milton-Jones (19)	Fowles (9)	Penicheiro; Prince; Toliver (5)	Allstate Arena; 5,909
Sun 31	3:00	Minnesota	@	San Antonio	NBA TV	70-69; MIN	Whalen (23)	Brunson (13)	Hammon; Whalen (6)	AT&T Center; 7,260
Sun 31	5:00	Atlanta	@	Connecticut		99-92; CON	McCoughtry (36)	Charles (11)	Lawson (9)	Mohegan Sun Arena; 6,955
Sun 31	6:00	Los Angeles	@	Indiana	NBA TV	98-63; IND	Davenport (16)	Catchings (11)	Catchings (6)	Conseco Fieldhouse; 9,256

August

Date	Time (ET)	Matchup			TV	Result	High points	High rebounds	High assists	Location/Attendance
Tue 2	7:30	New York	@	Atlanta	FS-S	85-75; NYL	McCoughtry (24)	Pierson (8)	Harding (9)	Philips Arena; 4,573
Tue 2	8:00	Phoenix	@	Minnesota	ESPN2	90-73; MIN	Moore (22)	McWilliams-Franklin (10)	Whalen (5)	Target Center; 7,126
Tue 2	10:00	San Antonio	@	Seattle		78-64; SEA	Bird (17)	Cash (9)	Wright (7)	KeyArena; 6,179
Wed 3	3:00	Connecticut	@	Los Angeles	NBA TV	79-70; CON	Charles (20)	Charles (13)	Montgomery (6)	Staples Center; 14,266
Thu 4	12:00	Chicago	@	New York	NBA TV; MSG	59-49; NYL	Pondexter (15)	Powell (10)	Carson; Pondexter; Prince (3)	Prudential Center; 10,133
Thu 4	8:00	San Antonio	@	Minnesota	NBA TV; FS-SW	62-60; MIN	McWilliams-Franklin; Young (18)	Brunson; Young (13)	Whalen (6)	Target Center; 8,123
Fri 5	8:00	Indiana	@	Tulsa		85-65; IND	Davenport (17)	Jackson (8)	Phillips (4)	BOK Center; 5,013
Fri 5	10:00	Connecticut	@	Seattle	NBA TV	81-79; SEA	Bird (20)	Charles (10)	Cash; Wright (5)	KeyArena; 7,289
Sat 6	7:00	New York	@	Washington	NBA TV	91-81; WAS	Ajavon (32)	Anosike; Langhorne (9)	Pondexter (7)	Verizon Center; 10,741
Sat 6	8:00	Tulsa	@	San Antonio		71-64; SAN	Jackson (27)	Jackson (10)	Hammon (5)	AT&T Center; 8,273
Sun 7	3:00	Seattle	@	Atlanta	NBA TV; SSO	70-53; ATL	McCoughtry (17)	de Souza; Lyttle (7)	Harding (7)	Philips Arena; 7,337
Sun 7	6:00	Connecticut	@	Phoenix	NBA TV; FS-A	96-95 (OT); CON	Taurasi (29)	Charles (17)	Greene; Taurasi (6)	US Airways Center; 8,514
Sun 7	6:00	Indiana	@	Chicago	CN100	88-69; CHI	Fowles; Murphy (21)	Fowles (12)	Catchings (5)	Allstate Arena; 5,794
Sun 7	8:30	Minnesota	@	Los Angeles	NBA TV	84-78; MIN	Whalen (24)	Augustus; Brunson (7)	Whalen (8)	Staples Center; 13,528
Tue 9	7:00	Atlanta	@	Washington	CSN-MA	72-70; ATL	Ajavon (28)	de Souza (12)	McCoughtry (5)	Verizon Center; 9,536
Tue 9	7:00	San Antonio	@	Indiana		81-68; IND	Catchings (21)	Young (9)	Hammon (5)	Conseco Fieldhouse; 7,520
Tue 9	7:30	Chicago	@	Connecticut		69-58; CON	Fowles (19)	Young (15)	Lawson; White (4)	Mohegan Sun Arena; 6,049
Tue 9	8:00	Seattle	@	New York	ESPN2	58-56; NYL	Pondexter (19)	Pierson (8)	Pondexter (5)	Prudential Center; 6,732
Tue 9	10:00	Minnesota	@	Phoenix		85-80; PHO	Moore (28)	Brunson; Dupree (11)	Whalen (6)	US Airways Center; 6,726
Tue 9	10:30	Tulsa	@	Los Angeles	PRIME	71-66; LAS	Penicheiro (23)	Hoffman (8)	Penicheiro (7)	Staples Center; 8,255
Thu 11	7:30	San Antonio	@	Connecticut	FS-SW	72-59; SAN	Hammon (18)	Jones (10)	Hammon (5)	Mohegan Sun Arena; 5,334
Thu 11	10:00	Atlanta	@	Phoenix		109-95; PHO	Bonner; McCoughtry (25)	Bonner (13)	Taylor (6)	US Airways Center; 7,940
Thu 11	10:00	Tulsa	@	Seattle		77-63; SEA	Cambage (24)	Cambage (10)	4 players (3)	KeyArena; 6,503
Fri 12	7:00	New York	@	Washington		64-63; WAS	Langhorne; Mitchell (18)	Anosike (11)	Mitchell (6)	Verizon Center; 10,092
Fri 12	8:30	Minnesota	@	Chicago	CN100	79-76; MIN	Fowles (28)	Fowles (13)	Vandersloot (8)	Allstate Arena; 6,289
Fri 12	10:30	Phoenix	@	Los Angeles		93-90 (OT); LAS	Taylor (29)	Bonner (10)	Johnson (12)	Staples Center; 10,512
Sat 13	7:00	Washington	@	Connecticut		82-75; CON	Langhorne (17)	White (10)	Miller (6)	Mohegan Sun Arena; 6,717
Sat 13	7:00	New York	@	Indiana	NBA TV	82-71; IND	Catchings (32)	Pondexter (8)	Pondexter (5)	Conseco Fieldhouse; 9,237
Sat 13	10:00	Atlanta	@	Seattle	NBA TV; KONG	92-63; ATL	Castro Marques; McCoughtry (17)	McCoughtry; Robinson (6)	Price (4)	KeyArena; 9,686
Sun 14	3:00	Chicago	@	San Antonio	NBA TV; CN100	85-73; CHI	Fowles (28)	Fowles (17)	D. Robinson (7)	AT&T Center; 7,060
Sun 14	7:00	Tulsa	@	Minnesota	NBA TV; COX; FS-N	82-54; MIN	Augustus (16)	Brunson (6)	Whalen (9)	Target Center; 8,388
Tue 16	7:00	Washington	@	New York		69-66; NYL	Pondexter (26)	Vaughn (7)	Ajavon; Powell (5)	Prudential Center; 6,223
Tue 16	7:30	Minnesota	@	Connecticut	CSN-NE	108-79; CON	Whalen (20)	Charles (18)	Montgomery (7)	Mohegan Sun Arena; 9,323
Tue 16	8:00	Indiana	@	San Antonio		65-63; IND	Catchings (24)	Young (13)	Bevilaqua (4)	AT&T Center; 6,358
Tue 16	10:00	Seattle	@	Phoenix		81-79; PHO	Taurasi (24)	Cash (15)	Bird (8)	US Airways Center; 8,870
Tue 16	10:30	Atlanta	@	Los Angeles	NBA TV; SSO; PRIME	84-79; ATL	McCoughtry (23)	de Souza (13)	Price (8)	Staples Center; 7,522
Thu 18	7:00	Connecticut	@	New York	NBA TV; MSG	84-81 (OT); NYL	Charles (29)	Charles (14)	Montgomery (5)	Prudential Center; 7,245
Thu 18	7:00	Minnesota	@	Washington		81-62; MIN	Augustus (18)	McWilliams-Franklin (7)	Whalen (7)	Verizon Center; 9,483
Thu 18	10:30	Indiana	@	Los Angeles		75-70; LAS	Hoffman (21)	Smith (9)	Catchings; Parker; Phillips (5)	Staples Center; 8,102
Fri 19	7:30	Connecticut	@	Atlanta	NBA TV; SSO	94-88 (OT); ATL	McCoughtry (26)	McCoughtry (12)	Montgomery (7)	Philips Arena; 7,225
Sat 20	7:00	Chicago	@	Washington	NBA TV; CN100	71-70; CHI	Fowles (25)	Fowles (11)	4 players (4)	Verizon Center; 10,273
Sat 20	8:00	Los Angeles	@	Minnesota		87-68; MIN	Parker (18)	McWilliams-Franklin; Parker (8)	Whalen (5)	Target Center; 8,816
Sat 20	10:00	San Antonio	@	Phoenix	NBA TV; FS-SW; FS-A	87-81; PHO	Taylor (28)	Bonner (11)	Hammon (10)	US Airways Center; 10,134
Sat 20	10:00	New York	@	Seattle		63-62; SEA	Jackson (20)	Cash; Jackson (7)	Pondexter (6)	KeyArena; 7,139
Sun 21	5:00	Atlanta	@	Connecticut		96-87; CON	McCoughtry (22)	de Souza; Jones (10)	Harding (9)	Mohegan Sun Arena; 6,636
Sun 21	6:00	Washington	@	Indiana	NBA TV; FS-I	83-51; IND	Douglas (15)	Catchings (8)	Catchings (5)	Conseco Fieldhouse; 7,935
Sun 21	7:00	Los Angeles	@	Tulsa		73-67; LAS	Parker (23)	Jackson (11)	Latta (6)	BOK Center; 6,012
Tue 23	7:00	Los Angeles	@	Washington	CSN-MA	86-82 (OT); LAS	Langhorne (28)	Thompson (10)	Penicheiro (6)	Verizon Center; 8,441
Tue 23	8:00	Minnesota	@	Tulsa		78-72; MIN	Holt; McWilliams-Franklin (18)	Brunson; Jackson (10)	Latta (7)	BOK Center; 3,750
Tue 23	8:00	Atlanta	@	Chicago	CN100	83-80; ATL	McCoughtry (22)	Fowles (12)	Harding (9)	Allstate Arena; 2,876
Tue 23	10:00	New York	@	Phoenix	ESPN2	74-70; NYL	Pondexter (25)	Taylor (9)	Pierson (5)	US Airways Center; 8,871
Tue 23	10:00	San Antonio	@	Seattle		63-55; SEA	Wright (16)	Cash (9)	Bird; Hammon (5)	KeyArena; 6,559
Thu 25	10:00	Tulsa	@	Seattle		74-57; SEA	L. Jackson (14)	T. Jackson; Robinson (9)	Bird (4)	KeyArena; 6,887
Fri 26	7:30	Phoenix	@	Connecticut	CSN-NE	95-92; CON	Taurasi; Taylor (26)	Dupree; Jones; Sanford (11)	Johnson (7)	Mohegan Sun Arena; 9,007
Fri 26	8:00	San Antonio	@	Minnesota	NBA TV	85-75; MIN	Augustus (19)	Brunson (8)	Hammon; Whalen (9)	Target Center; 9,212
Fri 26	8:30	Washington	@	Chicago	CN100	80-67; CHI	Langhorne (19)	Fowles (12)	Langhorne; Thorn; Vandersloot (5)	Allstate Arena; 4,434
Fri 26	10:30	Tulsa	@	Los Angeles	NBA TV	77-75; TUL	Milton-Jones (24)	Jackson (11)	Penicheiro (10)	Staples Center; 8,997
Sat 27	7:00	Atlanta	@	Indiana	NBA TV; SSO; FS-I	86-80; ATL	Catchings (22)	Lyttle (9)	Douglas (5)	Conseco Fieldhouse; 9,242
Sun 28	3:00	Minnesota	@	San Antonio		72-61; MIN	Augustus (20)	Brunson (14)	Hammon (7)	AT&T Center; 7,924
Sun 28	4:00	Connecticut	@	Tulsa		83-72; TUL	Swoopes (22)	Jackson (12)	Latta (6)	BOK Center; 4,813
Sun 28	4:00	Phoenix	@	Washington	NBA TV; CSN-MA	86-79; PHO	Dupree; Langhorne (27)	Langhorne (12)	Johnson (8)	Verizon Center; 11,614
Sun 28	6:00	New York	@	Chicago	NBA TV; CN100	74-73; CHI	Pierson (19)	Fowles (14)	Pondexter (8)	Allstate Arena; 5,707
Sun 28	9:00	Los Angeles	@	Seattle	ESPN2	65-63; SEA	Parker (19)	Parker (14)	Bird; Penicheiro (4)	KeyArena; 9,686
Tue 30	7:00	Chicago	@	New York	CN100; MSG+	71-67; NYL	Fowles (22)	Fowles; Pierson (8)	Thorn (4)	Prudential Center; 6,334
Tue 30	7:30	Indiana	@	Atlanta	SSO	92-90; ATL	McCoughtry (28)	Lyttle (11)	Harding (6)	Philips Arena; 6,467
Tue 30	8:00	Connecticut	@	San Antonio		78-66; SAN	Charles; Hammon (16)	Jones (10)	Hammon (6)	AT&T Center; 6,934
Tue 30	8:00	Phoenix	@	Tulsa		96-74; PHO	Bonner (25)	Bonner; Sanford (9)	Latta (6)	BOK Center; 3,590
Tue 30	8:00	Washington	@	Minnesota		73-56; MIN	Whalen (21)	Anosike; Brunson (7)	Whalen (5)	Target Center; 8,065
Tue 30	10:30	Seattle	@	Los Angeles	PRIME	68-62; LAS	Parker (27)	Cash; Wright (8)	Penicheiro (5)	Staples Center; 9,023

September

Date	Time (ET)	Matchup			TV	Result	High points	High rebounds	High assists	Location/Attendance
Thu 1	7:00	Atlanta	@	Washington		85-81; WAS	McCoughtry (30)	Gardin; Langhorne (10)	Harding (8)	Verizon Center; 7,954
Thu 1	8:00	Phoenix	@	San Antonio		86-68; SAN	Bonner; Perkins (23)	Dupree (13)	D. Robinson (7)	AT&T Center; 6,502
Fri 2	7:30	Indiana	@	Connecticut		83-55; CON	McCray (14)	Charles (16)	Charles (7)	Mohegan Sun Arena; 6,991
Fri 2	7:30	Washington	@	Atlanta	NBA TV; SSO	95-73; ATL	Price; Thomas (19)	Lyttle; Walker (8)	Harding (7)	Philips Arena; 6,579
Fri 2	8:00	Seattle	@	Tulsa		78-72; SEA	Bird (21)	T. Jackson (10)	Swoopes (6)	BOK Center; 6,117
Fri 2	8:00	New York	@	Minnesota		78-62; NYL	Mitchell (24)	Hollingsworth (9)	Pondexter (7)	Target Center; 8,929
Sat 3	8:00	Seattle	@	San Antonio	NBA TV	70-60; SEA	Young (22)	Cash (8)	D. Robinson (6)	AT&T Center; 9,575
Sat 3	10:00	Los Angeles	@	Phoenix	NBA TV	93-77; PHO	Parker (32)	Dupree (19)	Johnson (9)	US Airways Center; 9,620
Sun 4	3:00	Tulsa	@	Atlanta	SSO	73-52; ATL	McCoughtry (19)	Jackson (11)	Harding (10)	Philips Arena; 7,661
Sun 4	4:00	Minnesota	@	New York		86-68; MIN	Moore (19)	Pierson (8)	Pondexter; Whalen (7)	Prudential Center; 8,247
Sun 4	4:00	Connecticut	@	Washington	NBA TV; CSN-MA	79-48; CON	Charles (24)	Charles (15)	Montgomery (7)	Verizon Center; 13,403
Sun 4	6:00	Indiana	@	Chicago	NBA TV; CN100	88-80; IND	Prince (21)	Fowles (9)	Catchings; Prince (6)	Allstate Arena; 6,199
Tue 6	7:30	Connecticut	@	Atlanta	SSO	85-74; ATL	McCoughtry (35)	Charles; Lyttle (12)	Harding (8)	Philips Arena; 6,558
Tue 6	10:30	San Antonio	@	Los Angeles	NBA TV; FS-SW; PRIME	82-65; SAN	Hammon (37)	Appel; Milton-Jones (8)	Penicheiro (7)	Staples Center; 8,502
Wed 7	7:00	Washington	@	Indiana	NBA TV	87-69; IND	Douglas (21)	Langhorne (15)	Douglas (5)	Conseco Fieldhouse; 8,514
Thu 8	8:00	Chicago	@	Minnesota	NBA TV; CN100; FS-N	78-69; MIN	Augustus (22)	Swords (8)	Whalen (10)	Target Center; 8,781
Thu 8	10:00	Tulsa	@	Phoenix	NBA TV; COX	91-76; PHO	Cambage (22)	Bonner; Jackson (10)	Swanier (9)	US Airways Center; 8,189
Fri 9	7:00	Indiana	@	New York	NBA TV; MSG+	83-75; NYL	Carson (18)	Vaughn (9)	Bobbitt (7)	Prudential Center; 8,015
Fri 9	10:00	Phoenix	@	Seattle	KONG	85-70; SEA	Taurasi (36)	Bonner; Cash (14)	Bird (6)	KeyArena; 9,686
Fri 9	10:30	Tulsa	@	Los Angeles	NBA TV	84-73; LAS	Lavender (19)	Lavender (12)	Penicheiro (7)	Staples Center; 10,299
Sat 10	8:00	Washington	@	San Antonio	NBA TV	82-74; SAN	Young (17)	Anosike; Langhorne (9)	Hammon (11)	AT&T Center; 12,813
Sat 10	10:30	Chicago	@	Los Angeles	NBA TV; CN100	74-67; LAS	Fowles (18)	Fowles (11)	Lacy (7)	Staples Center; 13,501
Sun 11	1:00	New York	@	Connecticut	NBA TV	69-63; CON	Charles (18)	Charles; Jones (11)	Pondexter (5)	Mohegan Sun Arena; 9,115
Sun 11	5:00	Atlanta	@	Indiana	NBA TV; SSO; FS-I	93-88; ATL	McCoughtry (32)	Bales (11)	Bobbitt (6)	Conseco Fieldhouse; 11,521
Sun 11	6:00	Minnesota	@	Phoenix	FS-A	96-90; MIN	Taurasi (19)	Adair (13)	Wright (6)	US Airways Center; 12,666
Sun 11	7:00	San Antonio	@	Tulsa	NBA TV; FS-SW	102-94 (OT); SAN	D. Robinson (36)	Jackson (9)	Holt (7)	BOK Center; 5,949
Sun 11	9:00	Chicago	@	Seattle	NBA TV; KONG	81-70; SEA	Fowles (30)	Fowles (13)	Thorn (7)	KeyArena; 13,659

2011 WNBA postseason
Conference Semifinals (September 15–20)

Date	Time (ET)	Matchup			TV	Result	High points	High rebounds	High assists	Location/Attendance
Thu 15	8:00	New York	@	Indiana	ESPN2	74-72; IND	Douglas (25)	Powell (8)	Pondexter (6)	Conseco Fieldhouse; 7,608
Thu 15	10:00	Phoenix	@	Seattle	ESPN2	80-61; SEA	Wright (21)	Cash; Little (11)	Little (4)	KeyArena; 7,279
Fri 16	7:00	Atlanta	@	Connecticut	NBA TV	89-84; ATL	Harding (21)	Lyttle (11)	Harding (5)	Mohegan Sun Arena; 7,373
Fri 16	10:00	San Antonio	@	Minnesota	NBA TV	66-65; MIN	Whalen (20)	Brunson (14)	Young (6)	Target Center; 11,891
Sat 17	4:00	Indiana	@	New York	NBA TV; MSG	87-72; NYL	Douglas (20)	Catchings (9)	Pondexter (5)	Prudential Center; 8,508
Sat 17	10:00	Seattle	@	Phoenix	NBA TV	92-83; PHO	Dupree (29)	Dupree (13)	Johnson (9)	US Airways Center; 9,356
Sun 18	3:00	Connecticut	@	Atlanta	ESPN2	69-64; ATL	Jones (15)	Charles (17)	Harding; Montgomery (6)	Philips Arena; 6,887
Sun 18	5:00	Minnesota	@	San Antonio	ESPN2	84-75; SAN	Augustus; Perkins (24)	Brunson (16)	Hammon (6)	AT&T Center; 7,023
Mon 19	8:00	New York	@	Indiana	ESPN2	72-62; IND	Douglas (21)	Catchings (8)	Pondexter (5)	Conseco Fieldhouse; 7,368
Mon 19	10:00	Phoenix	@	Seattle	ESPN2	77-75; PHO	Bird (22)	Taylor (17)	Smith; Wright (4)	KeyArena; 8,589
Tue 20	8:00	San Antonio	@	Minnesota	ESPN2	85-67; MIN	Augustus (22)	Brunson (9)	Hammon (5)	Target Center; 8,734

Conference Finals (September 22–27)

Date	Time (ET)	Matchup			TV	Result	High points	High rebounds	High assists	Location/Attendance
Thu 22	7:00	Atlanta	@	Indiana	ESPN2	82–74; IND	Smith (25)	Catchings de Souza (13)	Harding (7)	Conseco Fieldhouse; 8,253
Thu 22	9:00	Phoenix	@	Minnesota	ESPN2	95–67; MIN	Taurasi (22)	Brunson (13)	Augustus (7)	Target Center; 8,912
Sun 25	3:00	Indiana	@	Atlanta	ESPN2	94-77; ATL	Castro Marques (30)	Catchings (9)	Harding (7)	Philips Arena; 8,052
Sun 25	5:00	Minnesota	@	Phoenix	ESPN2	103-86; MIN	Bonner; Taurasi (22)	Dupree (11)	McWilliams-Franklin (7)	US Airways Center; 8,617
Tue 27	8:00	Atlanta	@	Indiana	ESPN2	83-67; ATL	McCoughtry (26)	Lyttle (11)	Harding (6)	Conseco Fieldhouse; 9,036

WNBA Finals (October 2–7)

Date	Time (ET)	Matchup			TV	Result	High points	High rebounds	High assists	Location/Attendance
Sun 2	8:30	Atlanta	@	Minnesota	ESPN	88–74; MIN	McCoughtry (33)	Brunson (11)	Augustus (7)	Target Center; 15,258
Wed 5	8:00	Atlanta	@	Minnesota	ESPN2	101–95; MIN	McCoughtry (38)	de Souza (10)	Harding (7)	Target Center; 15,124
Fri 7	8:00	Minnesota	@	Atlanta	ESPN2	73–67; MIN	McCoughtry (22)	de Souza (15)	Harding (7)	Philips Arena; 11,543

== Playoffs ==
**Conference semifinals** Best-of-3
E1	**Indiana**	**2**
E4	New York	1
**Eastern Conference**
E2	Connecticut	0
E3	**Atlanta**	**2**
W1	**Minnesota**	**2**
W4	San Antonio	1
**Western Conference**
W2	Seattle	1
W3	**Phoenix**	**2**

**Conference finals** Best-of-3
E1	Indiana	1
E3	**Atlanta**	**2**
W1	**Minnesota**	**2**
W3	Phoenix	0

**WNBA Finals**; Best-of-5
E3	Atlanta	0
W1	**Minnesota**	**3**

- **Bold** – Series winner
- Italics – Team with home-court advantage

== Awards ==
=== Individual ===
Award		Winner	Team	Position	Votes/Statistic
Most Valuable Player (MVP)		Tamika Catchings	Indiana Fever	Forward	21 out of 40
Finals MVP		Seimone Augustus	Minnesota Lynx	Guard/Forward	Unanimous
Rookie of the Year		Maya Moore	Minnesota Lynx	Forward	38 out of 40
Most Improved Player		Kia Vaughn	New York Liberty	Center	15 out of 40
Defensive Player of the Year		Sylvia Fowles	Chicago Sky	Center	19 out of 40
Sixth Woman of the Year		DeWanna Bonner	Phoenix Mercury	Forward	20 out of 40
Kim Perrot Sportsmanship Award		Sue Bird	Seattle Storm	Guard	8 out of 39
Kim Perrot Sportsmanship Award		Ruth Riley	San Antonio Silver Stars	Center	8 out of 39
Peak Performers	**Scoring**	Diana Taurasi	Phoenix Mercury	Guard/Forward	21.6 PPG
Peak Performers	**Rebounding**	Tina Charles	Connecticut Sun	Center	11.0 RPG
Peak Performers	**Assists**	Lindsay Whalen	Minnesota Lynx	Guard	5.9 APG
Coach of the Year		Cheryl Reeve	Minnesota Lynx	Coach	36 out of 40

=== Team ===
Award		Guard	Guard	Forward	Forward	Center
**All-WNBA**	**First Team**	Lindsay Whalen	Diana Taurasi	Angel McCoughtry	Tamika Catchings	Tina Charles
**All-WNBA**	**Second Team**	Sue Bird	Cappie Pondexter	Penny Taylor	Seimone Augustus	Sylvia Fowles
**All-Defensive**	**First Team**	Tanisha Wright	Angel McCoughtry	Tamika Catchings	Rebekkah Brunson	Sylvia Fowles
**All-Defensive**	**Second Team**	Katie Douglas	Armintie Price	Swin Cash	Sancho Lyttle	Tina Charles
**All-Rookie Team**		Courtney Vandersloot	Danielle Robinson	Maya Moore	Danielle Adams	Liz Cambage

=== Players of the Week ===
Week ending	Eastern Conference		Western Conference	
Week ending	Player	Team	Player	Team
June 12	Katie Douglas	Indiana Fever	Rebekkah Brunson	Minnesota Lynx
June 20	Tina Charles	Connecticut Sun	Candice Dupree	Phoenix Mercury
June 27	Cappie Pondexter	New York Liberty	Penny Taylor	Phoenix Mercury
July 5	Tina Charles (2)	Connecticut Sun	Swin Cash	Seattle Storm
July 11	Cappie Pondexter (2)	New York Liberty	Sue Bird	Seattle Storm
July 18	Sylvia Fowles	Chicago Sky	Rebekkah Brunson (2)	Minnesota Lynx
July 25	Angel McCoughtry(2)	Atlanta Dream	Seimone Augustus	Minnesota Lynx
August 1	Angel McCoughtry(2)	Atlanta Dream	Becky Hammon	San Antonio Silver Stars
August 8	Tina Charles (3)	Connecticut Sun	Seimone Augustus (2)	Minnesota Lynx
August 15	Sylvia Fowles (2)	Chicago Sky	Diana Taurasi	Phoenix Mercury
August 21	Angel McCoughtry (3)	Atlanta Dream	Candace Parker	Los Angeles Sparks
August 29	Sylvia Fowles (3)	Chicago Sky	Seimone Augustus (3)	Minnesota Lynx
September 4	Tina Charles (4)	Connecticut Sun	DeWanna Bonner	Phoenix Mercury
September 11	Angel McCoughtry (4)	Atlanta Dream	Katie Smith	Seattle Storm

=== Players of the Month ===
Month	Eastern Conference		Western Conference	
Month	Player	Team	Player	Team
June	Tina Charles	Connecticut Sun	Rebekkah Brunson	Minnesota Lynx
July	Angel McCoughtry	Atlanta Dream	Seimone Augustus	Minnesota Lynx
August	Sylvia Fowles	Chicago Sky	Lindsay Whalen	Minnesota Lynx

=== Rookies of the Month ===
Month	Player	Team
June	Danielle Adams	San Antonio Silver Stars
July	Maya Moore (2)	Minnesota Lynx
August	Maya Moore (2)	Minnesota Lynx

== Coaches ==
=== Eastern Conference ===
- Atlanta Dream: Marynell Meadors
- Chicago Sky: Pokey Chatman
- Connecticut Sun: Mike Thibault
- Indiana Fever: Lin Dunn
- New York Liberty: John Whisenant
- Washington Mystics: Trudi Lacey

=== Western Conference ===
- Los Angeles Sparks: Jennifer Gillom and Joe Bryant
- Minnesota Lynx: Cheryl Reeve
- Phoenix Mercury: Corey Gaines
- San Antonio Silver Stars: Dan Hughes
- Seattle Storm: Brian Agler
- Tulsa Shock: Nolan Richardson and Teresa Edwards

== See also ==
- WNBA
- WNBA draft
- WNBA All-Star Game
- WNBA Playoffs
- WNBA Finals
