= 2010 Washington Mystics season =

- Head coach: Julie Plank
- Arena: Verizon Center

Results
- Record: 22–12 (.647)
- Place: 1st (Eastern)
- Playoff finish: Lost Conference Semifinals

Media
- Television: CSN-MA; NBATV, ESPN2

The 2010 WNBA season was the 13th season for the Washington Mystics of the Women's National Basketball Association. This season was the first that the Mystics won 20 games and had home court advantage to open a playoff series. They would not have home court again until the 2017 First Round. This was also the best regular-season record in franchise history.

== Transactions ==
=== Dispersal draft ===
Based on the Mystics' 2009 record, they would pick 6th in the Sacramento Monarchs dispersal draft. The Mystics picked Kristin Haynie.

=== WNBA draft ===
The following are the Mystics' selections in the 2010 WNBA draft.

Round	Pick	Player	Nationality	School/team/country
1	6	Jacinta Monroe	United States	Florida State
2	14 (from Minn.)	Jenna Smith	United States	Illinois
2	18	Shanavia Dowdell	United States	Louisiana Tech
3	30	Alexis Gray-Lawson	United States	California

=== Transaction log ===
- January 30, 2009: The Mystics received the second round pick in the 2010 draft from the Minnesota Lynx as part of the Lindsey Harding transaction.
- February 17: The Mystics re-signed free agent Monique Currie and signed La'Tangela Atkinson to a training camp contract..
- February 25: The Mystics signed Lauren Ervin to a training camp contract.
- March 16: The Mystics signed Katie Smith and Kristin Haynie.
- March 30: The Mystics signed Carla Thomas to a training camp contract.
- April 7: The Mystics signed Kristen Mann to a training camp contract.
- April 19: The Mystics re-signed Nikki Blue.
- April 23: The Mystics signed Ewelina Kobryn and LeLe Hardy to training camp contracts.
- April 28: The Mystics waived LeLe Hardy.
- April 30: The Mystics signed Jennifer Lacy and waived Alysha Harvin and Jenna Smith.
- May 6: The Mystics waived Alexis Gray-Lawson and Lauren Ervin.
- May 12: The Mystics traded Nikki Blue to the New York Liberty in exchange for Ashley Houts.
- May 13: The Mystics waived Shanavia Dowdell and suspended Kristin Haynie for the 2010 season.
- May 14: The Mystics waived La'Tangela Atkinson, Ewilina Korbyn, Jennifer Lacy, Kristen Mann and Carla Thomas.

=== Trades ===
Date	Trade	
May 12, 2010	To Washington Mystics	To New York Liberty
May 12, 2010	Ashley Houts	Nikki Blue

=== Free agents ===
==== Additions ====
Player	Signed	Former team
Monique Currie	February 17, 2010	re-signed
Katie Smith	March 16, 2010	Tulsa Shock
Ashley Houts	May 12, 2010	Washington Mystics

==== Subtractions ====
Player	Left	New team
Nikki Blue	May 12, 2010	New York Liberty
Kristen Mann	May 14, 2010	free agent

== Roster ==
2010 Washington Mystics roster
Players
Coaches

Pos.	No.	Nat.	Name	Height	Weight	From
G	22	(Liberia)	Ajavon, Matee	5' 8" (1.73m)	160 lb (73kg)	Rutgers
G/F	20	(United States)	Beard, Alana (injured)	5' 11" (1.8m)	160 lb (73kg)	Duke
G/F	4	(United States)	Coleman, Marissa	6' 1" (1.85m)	180 lb (82kg)	Maryland
PF	25	(United States)	Currie, Monique	6' 0" (1.83m)	177 lb (80kg)	Duke
G	10	(United States)	Harding, Lindsey	5' 8" (1.73m)	139 lb (63kg)	Duke
G	12	(United States)	Houts, Ashley	5' 6" (1.68m)	140 lb (64kg)	Georgia
C	1	(United States)	Langhorne, Crystal	6' 2" (1.88m)	184 lb (83kg)	Maryland
F/C	44	(United States)	Melvin, Chasity	6' 3" (1.91m)	185 lb (84kg)	NC State
F	50	(United States)	Monroe, Jacinta	6' 5" (1.96m)	162 lb (73kg)	Florida State
C	43	(United States)	Sanford, Nakia	6' 4" (1.93m)	200 lb (91kg)	Kansas
G	30	(United States)	Smith, Katie	5' 11" (1.8m)	175 lb (79kg)	Ohio State

Head coach
(United States) Julie Plank (Ohio State)
Assistant coaches
(United States) Marianne Stanley (Immaculata)
(United States) Trudi Lacey (NC State)
Athletic trainer
(United States) Navin Hettiarachchi (West Virginia)
Strength and conditioning coach
(United States) Lisa Ciaravella (Elon)

Legend

- (C) Team captain
- (DP) Unsigned draft pick
- (FA) Free agent
- (S) Suspended
- Injured

WNBA roster page

=== Depth ===
Pos.	Starter	Bench
C	Chasity Melvin	Nakia Sanford
PF	Crystal Langhorne	Jacinta Monroe
SF	Monique Currie	Marissa Coleman
SG	Katie Smith	Matee Ajavon / Alana Beard
PG	Lindsey Harding	Ashley Houts

== Season standings ==
Eastern Conference	W	L	PCT	GB	Home	Road	Conf.
Washington Mystics ^{x}	22	12	.647	–	13–4	9–8	13–9
New York Liberty ^{x}	22	12	.647	–	13–4	9–8	14–8
Indiana Fever ^{x}	21	13	.618	1.0	13–4	8–9	13–9
Atlanta Dream ^{x}	19	15	.559	3.0	10–7	9–8	10–12
Connecticut Sun ^{o}	17	17	.500	5.0	12–5	5–12	9–13
Chicago Sky ^{o}	14	20	.412	8.0	7–10	7–10	7–15

== Schedule ==
=== Preseason ===
2010 Game Log: Preseason

Game	Date	Time (ET)	Opponent	Score	High points	High rebounds	High assists	Location/Attendance	Record
1	May 5	11:30am	New York	65-60	Coleman (15)	Sanford (8)	Smith (3)	Verizon Center; 7,152	1-0
2	May 9	2:00pm	@ Atlanta	77-58	Currie (16)	Atkinson, Langhorne (8)	Harding, Smith (3)	Eblen Center; 2,219	2-0

=== Regular season ===
2010 Game Log: Regular Season
May

Game	Date	Time (ET)	Opponent	TV	Score	High points	High rebounds	High assists	Location/Attendance	Record
1	May 15	7:00pm	@ Indiana		72-65	Currie (21)	Langhorne (8)	Harding (3)	Conseco Fieldhouse; 9,752	1-0
2	May 16	7:00pm	@ Minnesota	FS-N	87-76	Currie (27)	Langhorne, Melvin (9)	Harding (4)	Target Center; 9,985	2-0
3	May 21	7:00pm	New York		77-61	Harding (21)	Langhorne (11)	Smith (4)	Verizon Center; 10,158	3-0
4	May 23	3:00pm	@ Connecticut		65-80	Langhorne (16)	Langhorne (8)	Harding (5)	Mohegan Sun Arena; 7,614	3-1
5	May 25	10:00pm	@ Seattle		76-82	Currie (24)	Sanford (6)	Harding (4)	KeyArena; 6,612	3-2
6	May 28	10:30pm	@ Los Angeles	PRIME	75-81	Smith (15)	Langhorne (10)	Harding (8)	STAPLES Center; 13,154	3-3
7	May 30	4:00pm	Connecticut		69-65	Currie (18)	Langhorne (16)	Harding (9)	Verizon Center; 8,602	4-3

June

Game	Date	Time (ET)	Opponent	TV	Score	High points	High rebounds	High assists	Location/Attendance	Record
8	June 5	7:00pm	Atlanta		79-86 (OT)	Langhorne (23)	Langhorne, Melvin (8)	Ajavon, Harding (4)	Verizon Center; 8,986	4-4
9	June 11	8:30pm	@ Chicago	CN100	95-78	Harding (25)	Currie, Langhorne (8)	Currie, Harding (5)	Allstate Arena; 3,107	5-4
10	June 12	7:00pm	New York	CSN-MA	82-65	Currie (20)	Langhorne (9)	Currie (4)	Verizon Center; 8,492	6-4
11	June 19	7:00pm	Chicago	NBATV; CSN-MA; CN100	65-61 (OT)	Smith (17)	Langhorne (10)	Harding (6)	Verizon Center; 9,034	7-4
12	June 24	7:00pm	Los Angeles	CSN-MA	68-53	Langhorne (27)	Langhorne (14)	Harding (4)	Verizon Center; 8,160	8-4
13	June 25	8:30pm	@ Chicago	CN100	72-79	Langhorne (25)	Langhorne (13)	Currie (4)	Allstate Arena; 3,419	8-5
14	June 27	4:00pm	Phoenix	NBATV; CSN-MA	95-85	Langhorne (31)	Langhorne (10)	Smith (6)	Verizon Center; 7,547	9-5
15	June 29	7:00pm	Indiana	ESPN2	68-65	Smith (21)	Langhorne (10)	Ajavon, Harding, Sanford (4)	Verizon Center; 8,464	10-5

July

Game	Date	Time (ET)	Opponent	TV	Score	High points	High rebounds	High assists	Location/Attendance	Record
16	July 1	10:00pm	@ Phoenix	FS-A	107-104	Smith (25)	Langhorne (9)	Harding (6)	US Airways Center; 5,509	11-5
17	July 3	8:00pm	@ Tulsa	COX	69-54	Currie (17)	Coleman (10)	Coleman, Harding, Smith (4)	BOK Center; 3,516	12-5
18	July 15	12:00pm	@ New York		67-75	Langhorne (19)	Langhorne (10)	Harding (4)	Madison Square Garden; 18,162	12-6
19	July 18	4:00pm	Chicago	CSN-MA	59-61	Langhorne (12)	Langhorne (9)	Harding (6)	Verizon Center; 8,790	12-7
20	July 21	11:30am	Atlanta	NBATV; CSN-MA	82-72	Langhorne (24)	Langhorne (15)	Smith (5)	Verizon Center; 14,347	13-7
21	July 24	7:00pm	Indiana	NBATV; CSN-MA	73-78	Smith (17)	Langhorne (13)	Harding (3)	Verizon Center; 9,786	13-8
22	July 27	7:30pm	@ Connecticut		78-88	Langhorne (23)	Currie (9)	Coleman, Melvin, Smith (3)	Mohegan Sun Arena; 6,322	13-9
23	July 29	7:00pm	San Antonio	NBATV; CSN-MA	75-79	Currie (22)	Langhorne (9)	Harding (5)	Verizon Center; 9,212	13-10
24	July 30	7:00pm	@ Indiana		77-73	Harding (33)	Langhorne (11)	Sanford, Smith (4)	Conseco Fieldhouse; 8,207	14-10

August

Game	Date	Time (ET)	Opponent	TV	Score	High points	High rebounds	High assists	Location/Attendance	Record
25	August 1	4:00pm	Tulsa	NBATV; CSN-MA	87-62	Currie, Smith (15)	Coleman (10)	Coleman, Harding (4)	Verizon Center; 9,008	15-10
26	August 3	7:30pm	@ Atlanta	ESPN2	86-78	Smith (18)	Langhorne (12)	Harding (6)	Philips Arena; 9,072	16-10
27	August 6	7:30pm	@ New York		77-85	Currie (23)	Currie, Melvin (6)	Ajavon, Coleman, Smith (2)	Madison Square Garden; 11,465	16-11
28	August 8	5:00pm	@ Connecticut		67-76	Langhorne (14)	Langhorne (7)	Harding (3)	Mohegan Sun Arena; 7,076	16-12
29	August 10	7:00pm	Connecticut	NBATV; CSN-MA	84-74	Langhorne (23)	Langhorne (10)	Harding (6)	Verizon Center; 8,180	17-12
30	August 13	7:00pm	Minnesota		61-58	Harding (15)	Langhorne (14)	Smith (4)	Verizon Center; 7,752	18-12
31	August 15	4:00pm	Seattle		80-71	Currie (25)	Langhorne (7)	4 players (3)	Verizon Center; 9,438	19-12
32	August 17	8:00pm	@ San Antonio		76-66	Langhorne (21)	Langhorne (12)	Smith (6)	AT&T Center; 6,801	20-12
33	August 20	7:00pm	New York		75-74	Ajavon (16)	Langhorne (7)	Coleman, Harding (2)	Verizon Center; 13,109	21-12
34	August 22	3:00pm	@ Atlanta	SSO	90-81	Currie (20)	Langhorne (11)	Harding (8)	Philips Arena; 9,570	22-12

All games are viewable on WNBA LiveAccess

=== Postseason ===
2010 Game Log: Postseason
Eastern Conference Semifinals

Game	Date	Time (ET)	Opponent	TV	Score	High points	High rebounds	High assists	Location/Attendance	Series
1	August 25	7:00pm	Atlanta	NBATV	90-95	Coleman (18)	Currie (11)	Harding (5)	Verizon Center; 10,322	0-1
2	August 27	7:30pm	@ Atlanta	NBATV; FSSO	77-101	Ajavon (20)	Currie, Langhorne (7)	Ajavon (3)	Philips Arena; 7,890	0-2

== Statistics ==
Legend
GP	Games played	GS	Games started	MPG	Minutes per game	RPG	Rebounds per game
APG	Assists per game	SPG	Steals per game	BPG	Blocks per game	PPG	Points per game
FG%	Field-goal percentage	3P%	3-point field-goal percentage	FT%	Free-throw percentage	TO	Turnovers per game
PF	Fouls per game		Team leader		League leader

=== Regular season ===
Player	GP	GS	MPG	FG%	3P%	FT%	RPG	APG	SPG	BPG	PPG
Matee Ajavon	34	0	14.6	.346	.184	.773	1.6	1.4	1.12	0.06	5.9
Marissa Coleman	34	1	19.5	.397	.402	.756	3.3	1.5	0.85	0.35	6.5
Monique Currie	34	34	26.2	.436	.446	.877	4.8	1.6	1.44	0.41	14.1
Lindsey Harding	34	34	33.2	.445	.288	.766	3.0	4.0	1.38	0.18	12.1
Ashley Houts	20	0	5.5	.375	.250	1.000	0.7	0.5	0.30	0.00	0.9
Crystal Langhorne	34	34	34.1	.589	.167	.772	9.7	1.1	0.88	0.21	16.3
Chasity Melvin	34	12	19.4	.434	.000	.643	4.7	0.7	0.71	0.50	5.2
Jacinta Monroe	17	0	6.9	.484	.000	.500	0.9	0.2	0.29	0.47	2.1
Nakia Sanford	34	22	17.9	.478	.000	.697	4.2	0.7	0.74	0.24	6.0
Katie Smith	33	33	30.8	.395	.362	.764	2.1	2.6	0.73	0.15	9.5

=== Postseason ===
Player	GP	GS	MPG	FG%	3P%	FT%	RPG	APG	SPG	BPG	PPG
Matee Ajavon	2	0	17.5	.440	.400	.750	0.0	1.5	1.50	0.00	18.0
Marissa Coleman	2	0	25.0	.400	.300	.800	4.0	1.0	1.00	0.00	13.5
Monique Currie	2	2	28.0	.167	.200	.765	9.0	1.0	1.00	0.00	10.0
Lindsey Harding	2	2	33.5	.219	.400	.625	2.5	3.0	2.00	0.00	10.5
Ashley Houts	1	0	4.0	.000	.000	.000	1.0	0.0	0.00	0.00	0.0
Crystal Langhorne	2	2	35.0	.458	.000	1.000	8.0	1.5	0.00	2.00	13.5
Chasity Melvin	2	1	15.0	.800	.000	.750	2.0	1.0	1.00	0.00	5.5
Jacinta Monroe	2	0	2.5	.000	.000	.000	0.5	0.0	0.50	0.00	0.0
Nakia Sanford	2	1	14.0	.714	.000	.500	3.0	0.5	0.50	0.50	5.5
Katie Smith	2	2	27.5	.333	.143	.833	4.0	1.0	0.50	0.00	7.0

== Awards and honors ==
- Crystal Langhorne was named WNBA Eastern Conference Player of the Week for the week of June 19, 2010.
- Crystal Langhorne was named WNBA Eastern Conference Player of the Month for June.
- Monique Currie was named to the 2010 WNBA All-Star Team as a WNBA starter.
- Lindsey Harding was named to the 2010 WNBA All-Star Team as a WNBA starter.
- Crystal Langhorne was named to the 2010 WNBA All-Star Team as a WNBA starter.
- Lindsey Harding was named to the All-Defensive Second Team.
- Crystal Langhorne was named to the All-WNBA Second Team.
