= Ashley Houts =

American basketball player (born 1987)

Personal information
- Born: December 31, 1987 (age 38)
- Listed height: 5 ft 6 in (1.68 m)
- Listed weight: 140 lb (64 kg)

Career information
- High school: Dade County (Trenton, Georgia)
- College: Georgia (2006–2010)
- WNBA draft: 2010: 2nd round, 16th overall pick
- Drafted by: New York Liberty
- Playing career: 2010–present
- Position: Guard

Career history
- 2010: Washington Mystics

Career highlights
- First-team All-SEC (2010); SEC Freshman of the Year (2007); SEC All-Freshman Team (2007); McDonald's All-American (2006)
- Stats at WNBA.com
- Stats at Basketball Reference
Medals
Women's basketball
Representing United States
World University Games
Gold medal – first place	2009 Belgrade	Team

Ashley Houts (born December 31, 1987) is an American former professional basketball player who played for the Washington Mystics of the WNBA.

== Early life ==
Ashley Houts attended Dade County High School where she played basketball.

During her attendance she was elected to play the McDonald's and WBCA High School All-American games and was also named second-team All-American by Parade and Sixth-team by Street & Smith's.

She is a two-time All-American honoree who led the Georgia Metros to the 2005 national title in Orlando as well as the U.S. Junior Nationals in Washington, D.C.

As a senior, she was named Homecoming Queen and made Miss Dade County High as a senior.

Following her graduation in 2006 her "23" jersey was retired by Dade County.

== College career ==
Houts played at the University of Georgia from 2006 to 2010.

== Professional career ==
=== WNBA ===
Houts was chosen by the New York Liberty in the second round of the 2010 WNBA draft. Shortly thereafter, she was traded to the Washington Mystics in exchange for Nikki Blue.

== USA Basketball ==
Houts played on the 2007 FIBA U21 World Championship Team and U.S. National Team at the 2009 World University Games winning two gold medals.

== Career statistics ==
Legend
GP	Games played	GS	Games started	MPG	Minutes per game	RPG	Rebounds per game
APG	Assists per game	SPG	Steals per game	BPG	Blocks per game	PPG	Points per game
TO	Turnovers per game	FG%	Field-goal percentage	3P%	3-point field-goal percentage	FT%	Free-throw percentage
**Bold**	Career best	°	League leader

=== WNBA ===
==== Regular season ====
WNBA regular season statistics
Year	Team	GP	GS	MPG	FG%	3P%	FT%	RPG	APG	SPG	BPG	TO	PPG
2010	Washington	20	0	5.5	37.5	25.0	100.0	0.7	0.5	0.3	0.0	0.4	0.9
**Career**	1 year, 1 team	20	0	5.5	37.5	25.0	100.0	0.7	0.5	0.3	0.0	0.4	0.9

==== Playoffs ====
WNBA playoffs statistics
Year	Team	GP	GS	MPG	FG%	3P%	FT%	RPG	APG	SPG	BPG	TO	PPG
2010	Washington	1	0	4.0	0.0	0.0	0.0	1.0	0.0	0.0	0.0	0.0	0.0
**Career**	1 year, 1 team	1	0	4.0	0.0	0.0	0.0	1.0	0.0	0.0	0.0	0.0	0.0

=== College ===
Legend
GP	Games played	GS	Games started	MPG	Minutes per game
FG%	Field goal percentage	3P%	3-point field goal percentage	FT%	Free throw percentage
RPG	Rebounds per game	APG	Assists per game	SPG	Steals per game
BPG	Blocks per game	PPG	Points per game	**Bold**	Career high

Year	Team	GP	Points	FG%	3P%	FT%	RPG	APG	SPG	BPG	PPG
2006-07	Georgia	**34**	320	41.6	**34.4**	77.2	3.1	3.6	**2.7**	-	9.4
2007-08	Georgia	33	387	**42.7**	34.3	79.4	2.8	**4.9**	2.6	0.0	11.7
2008-09	Georgia	32	385	41.0	31.2	77.9	2.8	4.7	2.2	-	12.0
2009-10	Georgia	**34**	**422**	39.8	29.5	**81.6**	**3.2**	3.7	2.0	0.0	**12.4**
**Career**		133	1514	41.1	32.1	79.1	3.0	4.2	2.4	0.0	11.4

== Personal life ==
Houts is the daughter of Greg and Joni Houts. Her sister, Emily Houts, played collegiately at Gadsden State Community College and Chattanooga. Her brother, Andrew Houts, was a second-team All-State honoree as a junior and a first-team All-State honoree as a senior at Dade County.
