= Jacinta Monroe =

American basketball player (born 1988)

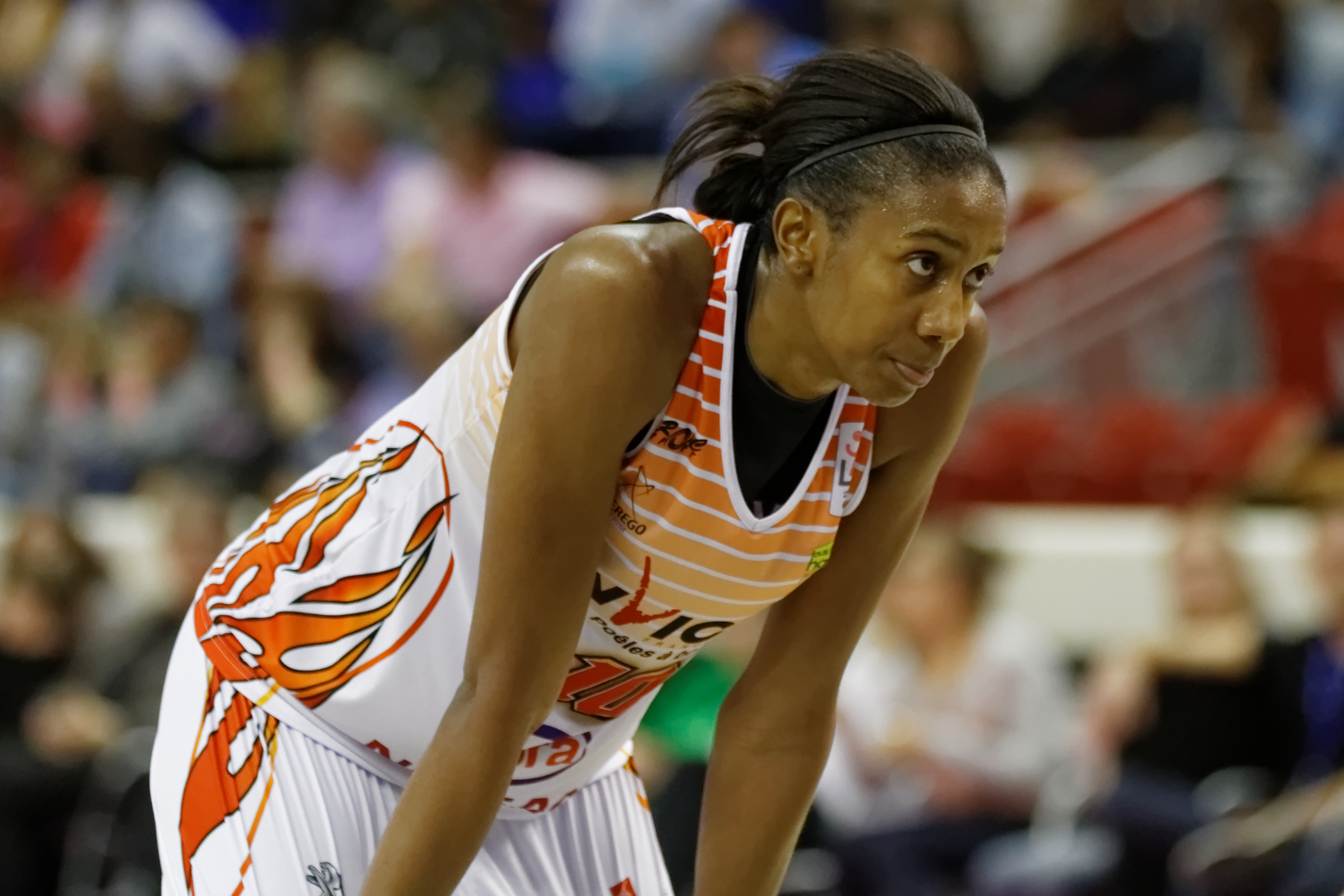

Personal information
- Born: September 4, 1988 (age 38)
- Listed height: 6 ft 5 in (1.96 m)
- Listed weight: 162 lb (73 kg)

Career information
- High school: Stranahan (Fort Lauderdale, Florida)
- College: Florida State (2006–2010)
- WNBA draft: 2010: 1st round, 6th overall pick
- Drafted by: Washington Mystics
- Position: Center

Career history
- 2010: Washington Mystics
- 2011: Tulsa Shock

Career highlights
- First-team All-ACC (2010); 2× ACC All-Defensive team (2009, 2010); ACC All-Freshman Team (2007)
- Stats at WNBA.com
- Stats at Basketball Reference
Medals
Women's basketball
Representing United States
World University Games
Gold medal – first place	2009 Belgrade	Team

Jacinta Monroe (born September 4, 1988) is an American professional women's basketball player in the Women's National Basketball Association (WNBA).

== Career ==
Monroe attended Stranahan High School in Fort Lauderdale, Florida, where she was the 2006 Gatorade Florida Girls' Basketball Player of the Year. She attended Florida State University. In the WNBA, Monroe has played with the Washington Mystics and the Tulsa Shock.

== Career statistics ==
=== WNBA ===
Legend
GP	Games played	GS	Games started	MPG	Minutes per game	RPG	Rebounds per game
APG	Assists per game	SPG	Steals per game	BPG	Blocks per game	PPG	Points per game
TO	Turnovers per game	FG%	Field-goal percentage	3P%	3-point field-goal percentage	FT%	Free-throw percentage
**Bold**	Career best	°	League leader

==== Regular season ====
Year	Team	GP	GS	MPG	FG%	3P%	FT%	RPG	APG	SPG	BPG	TO	PPG
2010	Washington	**17**	0	**6.9**	**48.4**	0.0	**50.0**	0.9	0.2	**0.3**	**0.5**	**0.4**	**2.1**
2011	Tulsa	4	0	5.3	0.0	0.0	0.0	**1.0**	**0.3**	0.0	0.0	0.5	0.0
Career	2 years, 2 teams	21	0	6.6	42.9	0.0	50.0	1.0	0.2	0.2	0.4	0.4	1.7

==== Playoffs ====
Year	Team	GP	GS	MPG	FG%	3P%	FT%	RPG	APG	SPG	BPG	TO	PPG
2010	Washington	2	0	2.5	0.0	0.0	0.0	0.5	0.0	0.5	0.0	0.0	0.0
Career	1 year, 1 team	2	0	2.5	0.0	0.0	0.0	0.5	0.0	0.5	0.0	0.0	0.0

=== College ===
NCAA statistics
Year	Team	GP	Points	FG%	3P%	FT%	RPG	APG	SPG	BPG	PPG
2006–07	Florida State	**34**	276	53.9	20.0	64.6	6.0	0.5	0.8	1.9	8.1
2007–08	Florida State	33	337	**59.2**	–	59.3	6.2	0.3	0.8	2.4	10.2
2008–09	Florida State	**34**	444	51.5	–	68.8	**7.4**	0.8	**1.1**	**2.5**	13.1
2009–10	Florida State	35	**461**	50.6	**33.3**	**74.0**	7.3	**0.9**	0.8	2.2	**13.2**
**Career**		136	1518	53.2	16.7	67.5	6.7	0.6	0.9	2.2	11.2

== USA Basketball ==
Monroe was named a member of the team representing the US at the 2009 World University Games held in Belgrade, Serbia. The team won all seven games to earn the gold medal. Monroe averaged 7.3 points per game
