= 2009 Washington Mystics season =

- Head coach: Julie Plank
- Arena: Verizon Center

Results
- Record: 16–18 (.471)
- Place: 4th (Eastern)
- Playoff finish: Lost First Round

The 2009 WNBA season was the 12th season for the Washington Mystics franchise of the Women's National Basketball Association. The Mystics reached the playoffs for the first time in three years. They lost to the Indiana Fever in the first round in a sweep.

== Offseason ==
=== Dispersal Draft ===
Based on the Mystics' 2008 record, they would pick 2nd in the Houston Comets dispersal draft. The Mystics picked Matee Ajavon.

=== WNBA draft ===
The following are the Mystics' selections in the 2009 WNBA draft.

Round	Pick	Player	Nationality	School/Team/Country
1	2	Marissa Coleman	United States	Maryland
2	23 (from Conn., via Minn.)	Camille LeNoir	United States	Southern California
2	24 (from Det.)	Jelena Milovanovic	Serbia	Serbia
3	28	Josephine Owino	Kenya	Union

=== Transactions ===
- June 16: The Mystics signed Kristen Mann and waived Josephine Owino.
- June 5: The Mystics waived Bernice Mosby.
- June 4: The Mystics waived Kristen Mann and Kelly Schumacher.
- June 2: The Mystics waived Eshaya Murphy.
- June 1: The Mystics waived Kiesha Brown.
- May 11: The Mystics signed Kelly Schumacher waived Coco Miller.
- May 1: The Mystics signed Kiesha Brown and waived Crystal Smith and Camille LeNoir.
- April 15: The Mystics waived Laurie Koehn, Krystal Vaughn, and Andrea Gardner.
- February 9: The Mystics signed free agent Chasity Melvin and waived Miriam Sy and Zane Teilane.
- February 6: The Mystics signed Andrea Gardner, Laurie Koehn and Crystal Smith to training camp contracts.
- January 30: The Mystics acquired Lindsey Harding, the 23rd pick in the 2009 WNBA Draft, and the second-round pick in the 2010 Draft from the Minnesota Lynx in exchange for the 9th and the 15th picks in the 2009 WNBA Draft.
- January 20: The Mystics claimed Kristen Mann off waivers.
- September 14, 2008: The Mystics signed Coco Miller to a two-year extension.
- August 12, 2008: The Mystics received a second-round pick in the 2009 WNBA Draft (24th overall) from the Detroit Shock as part of the Taj McWilliams-Franklin/Tasha Humphrey transaction.

Date	Trade	
August 12, 2008	To Washington Mystics	To Detroit Shock
August 12, 2008	24th pick in 2009 Draft, Tasha Humphrey, Eshaya Murphy	Taj McWilliams-Franklin
January 30, 2009	To Washington Mystics	To Minnesota Lynx
January 30, 2009	Lindsey Harding, 23rd pick in 2009 Draft, second-round pick in 2010 Draft	9th and 15th picks in 2009 Draft

=== Free agents ===
==== Additions ====
Player	Signed	Former team
Matee Ajavon	December 8, 2008	Houston Comets
Lindsey Harding	January 30, 2009	Minnesota Lynx
Chasity Melvin	February 9, 2009	Chicago Sky
Kristen Mann	June 16, 2009	Washington Mystics

==== Subtractions ====
Player	Left	New team
Andrea Gardner	April 15, 2009	free agent
Laurie Koehn	April 15, 2009	Phoenix Mercury
Krystal Vaughn	April 15, 2009	free agent
Crystal Smith	May 1, 2009	free agent
Camille LeNoir	May 1, 2009	free agent
Coco Miller	May 11, 2009	Atlanta Dream
Bernice Mosby	June 5, 2009	free agent
Josephine Owino	June 16, 2009	free agent

== Roster ==
2009 Washington Mystics roster
Players
Coaches

Pos.	No.	Nat.	Name	Height	Weight	From
G	22	(United States)	Ajavon, Matee	5' 8" (1.73m)	160 lb (73kg)	Rutgers
G/F	20	(United States)	Beard, Alana	5' 11" (1.8m)	160 lb (73kg)	Duke
PG	32	(United States)	Blue, Nikki	5' 8" (1.73m)	163 lb (74kg)	UCLA
G/F	4	(United States)	Coleman, Marissa	6' 1" (1.85m)	180 lb (82kg)	Maryland
PF	25	(United States)	Currie, Monique	6' 0" (1.83m)	177 lb (80kg)	Duke
G	10	(United States)	Harding, Lindsey	5' 8" (1.73m)	139 lb (63kg)	Duke
C	1	(United States)	Langhorne, Crystal	6' 2" (1.88m)	184 lb (83kg)	Maryland
F	24	(United States)	Mann, Kristen	6' 1" (1.85m)	185 lb (84kg)	UC Santa Barbara
F/C	44	(United States)	Melvin, Chasity	6' 3" (1.91m)	185 lb (84kg)	NC State
F	33	(United States)	Mosby, Bernice	6' 1" (1.85m)	140 lb (64kg)	Baylor
C	43	(United States)	Sanford, Nakia	6' 4" (1.93m)	200 lb (91kg)	Kansas

Head coach
(United States) Julie Plank (Ohio State)
Assistant coaches
(United States) Trudi Lacey (NC State)
(United States) Lubomyr Lichonczak (Idaho)
(United States) Vicky Bullett (Maryland)
Athletic trainer
(United States) Navin Hettiarachchi (West Virginia)
Strength and conditioning coach
(United States) Lisa Ciaravella (Elon)

Legend

- (C) Team captain
- (DP) Unsigned draft pick
- (FA) Free agent
- (S) Suspended
- Injured

WNBA roster page

== Season standings ==
Eastern Conference	W	L	PCT	GB	Home	Road	Conf.
Indiana Fever ^{x}	22	12	.647	–	14–3	8–9	17–5
Atlanta Dream ^{x}	18	16	.529	4.0	12–5	6–11	10–12
Detroit Shock ^{x}	18	16	.529	4.0	11–6	7–10	11–11
Washington Mystics ^{x}	16	18	.471	6.0	11–6	5–12	10–12
Chicago Sky ^{o}	16	18	.471	6.0	12–5	4–13	10–12
Connecticut Sun ^{o}	16	18	.471	6.0	12–5	4–13	9–12
New York Liberty ^{o}	13	21	.382	9.0	8–9	5–12	8–13

== Schedule ==
=== Preseason ===
2009 Game Log: Preseason

Game	Date	Time (ET)	Opponent	Score	High points	High rebounds	High assists	Location/Attendance	Record
1	May 21	11:00am	@ New York	71-77	Sanford (17)	Sanford (8)	Currie (2)	Madison Square Garden; 15,958	0-1
2	May 28	11:30am	New York	74-56	Ajavon (17)	Coleman, Langhorne (6)	Ajavon (3)	Verizon Center; 9,287	1-1

=== Regular season ===
2009 Game Log: Regular Season
June

Game	Date	Time (ET)	Opponent	TV	Score	High points	High rebounds	High assists	Location/Attendance	Record
1	June 6	4:00pm	@ Connecticut		82-70	Coleman (16)	Sanford, Langhorne (7)	Harding (7)	Mohegan Sun Arena; 7,191	1-0
2	June 7	4:00pm	Atlanta		77-71	Beard (27)	Langhorne (8)	Harding (7)	Verizon Center; 11,759	2-0
3	June 10	7:30pm	@ Detroit		75-69	Beard (15)	Melvin (9)	Harding (5)	Palace of Auburn Hills; 7,329	3-0
4	June 19	7:30pm	@ Atlanta		81-93	Beard (20)	Langhorne (10)	Currie, Harding (7)	Philips Arena; 6,050	3-1
6	June 20	7:00pm	Chicago		81-72	Beard (31)	Melvin (9)	Beard (5)	Verizon Center; 11,745	4-1
6	June 25	7:00pm	Phoenix		87-93	Beard (21)	Langhorne (12)	Harding (9)	Verizon Center; 9,808	4-2
7	June 27	8:00pm	@ Chicago		63-68	Harding (15)	Melvin (9)	Harding (6)	UIC Pavilion; 3,918	4-3
8	June 30	8:00pm	@ San Antonio		84-82	Beard, Harding (19)	Currie (8)	Harding (5)	AT&T Center; 4,723	5-3

July

Game	Date	Time (ET)	Opponent	TV	Score	High points	High rebounds	High assists	Location/Attendance	Record
9	July 3	7:30pm	@ Atlanta		65-72	Beard (16)	Melvin (9)	Harding (4)	Philips Arena; 5,456	5-4
10	July 7	8:30pm	@ Minnesota		94-96 (OT)	Harding (27)	Currie (11)	Currie (4)	Target Center; 7,171	5-5
11	July 11	7:00pm	Los Angeles		75-63	Beard (26)	Langhorne (11)	Harding (5)	Verizon Center; 12,217	6-5
12	July 15	11:30am	San Antonio		78-79	Harding (18)	Beard, Langhorne (6)	Harding (4)	Verizon Center; 17,220	6-6
13	July 18	7:00pm	New York		68-67	Harding (23)	Harding (7)	Harding (5)	Verizon Center; 9,968	7-6
14	July 21	7:00pm	Indiana		70-82	Harding (17)	Beard (9)	Harding (6)	Verizon Center; 9,798	7-7
15	July 23	7:00pm	Chicago	ESPN2	75-64	Langhorne (16)	Langhorne (10)	Harding (6)	Verizon Center; 11,651	8-7
16	July 26	4:00pm	Sacramento		87-73	Langhorne (19)	Langhorne (8)	Beard (5)	Verizon Center; 10,757	9-7
17	July 28	7:00pm	@ Indiana		85-81	Beard (19)	Langhorne (8)	Harding, Melvin (4)	Conseco Fieldhouse; 5,904	9-8
18	July 30	7:30pm	@ New York	NBA TV; MSG	78-75	Beard (28)	Langhorne (11)	Harding (4)	Madison Square Garden; 10,172	10-8

August

Game	Date	Time (ET)	Opponent	TV	Score	High points	High rebounds	High assists	Location/Attendance	Record
19	August 2	4:00pm	Indiana		79-87	Beard (23)	Currie (7)	Currie, Harding (4)	Verizon Center; 11,595	10-9
20	August 7	7:00pm	Detroit		70-66	Beard (15)	Langhorne (9)	Harding (4)	Verizon Center; 10,637	11-9
21	August 9	3:00pm	@ Connecticut		67-96	Beard (18)	Beard, Harding (7)	Beard (6)	Mohegan Sun Arena; 6,528	11-10
22	August 11	7:00pm	Detroit		77-81	Beard (17)	Sanford (6)	Harding (8)	Verizon Center; 10,398	11-11
23	August 14	7:00pm	Connecticut		91-89 (2OT)	Beard (26)	Langhorne (16)	Harding (4)	Verizon Center; 9,738	12-11
24	August 16	4:00pm	New York		59-60	Beard (18)	Langhorne (8)	Harding (7)	Verizon Center; 10,580	12-12
25	August 18	10:30pm	@ Los Angeles		69-72	Ajavon (20)	Harding, Langhorne (6)	Ajavon (4)	STAPLES Center; 9,287	12-13
26	August 21	10:00pm	@ Phoenix		91-81	Langhorne (19)	Langhorne (12)	Harding (6)	US Airways Center; 9,155	13-13
27	August 22	10:00pm	@ Sacramento		60-82	Langhorne (16)	Langhorne (10)	Harding (3)	ARCO Arena; 7,067	13-14
28	August 25	10:00pm	@ Seattle		68-78	Coleman, Currie (13)	Currie (6)	Ajavon (3)	KeyArena; 6,791	13-15
29	August 30	4:00pm	Minnesota		81-75	Langhorne (18)	Langhorne (10)	Hardin (5)	Verizon Center; 12,241	14-15

September

Game	Date	Time (ET)	Opponent	TV	Score	High points	High rebounds	High assists	Location/Attendance	Record
30	September 3	7:00pm	Seattle		78-67	Currie (17)	Langhorne (11)	Harding (5)	Verizon Center; 10,648	15-15
31	September 4	8:30pm	@ Chicago		86-92	Ajavon (32)	Langhorne (10)	Harding (5)	UIC Pavilion; 3,241	15-16
32	September 6	4:00pm	@ Indiana		61-72	Langhorne (13)	Sanford (10)	Sanford (3)	Conseco Fieldhouse; 9,702	15-17
33	September 12	7:00pm	Atlanta		82-64	Harding (25)	Langhorne (8)	Currie (5)	Verizon Center; 11,987	16-17
34	September 13	4:00pm	@ New York	MSG	65-86	Currie (17)	Ajavon (9)	Currie (5)	Madison Square Garden; 15,667	16-18

All games are viewable on WNBA LiveAccess

=== Postseason ===
2009 Game Log: Postseason
Eastern Conference Semifinals

Game	Date	Time (ET)	Opponent	TV	Score	High points	High rebounds	High assists	Location/Attendance	Series
1	September 17	7:00pm	Indiana	ESPN2	79-88	Langhorne (18)	Langhorne (10)	Melvin (4)	Comcast Center; 6,332	0-1
2	September 19	7:00pm	@ Indiana	NBA TV	74-81 (OT)	Langhorne (15)	Currie (14)	Harding (5)	Conseco Fieldhouse; 9,655	0-2

== Regular Season Statistics ==
Legend
GP	Games played	GS	Games started	MPG	Minutes per game	RPG	Rebounds per game
APG	Assists per game	SPG	Steals per game	BPG	Blocks per game	PPG	Points per game
FG%	Field-goal percentage	3P%	3-point field-goal percentage	FT%	Free-throw percentage	TO	Turnovers per game
PF	Fouls per game		Team leader		League leader

=== Player statistics ===
Player	GP	GS	MPG	RPG	APG	SPG	BPG	PPG
Matee Ajavon	34	4	17.3	1.9	1.1	1.09	0.12	6.0
Alana Beard	31	30	31.8	4.0	2.2	2.32	0.58	15.9
Nikki Blue	16	0	5.7	0.6	0.8	0.44	0.00	1.5
Marissa Coleman	28	0	18.8	2.7	0.8	0.71	0.32	6.1
Monique Currie	34	34	21.4	4.3	1.8	0.85	0.41	8.2
Lindsey Harding	34	34	35.1	4.0	4.5	1.26	0.38	12.8
Tasha Humphrey	9	0	7.4	1.4	0.3	0.10	0.30	2.2
Crystal Langhorne	34	22	29.8	7.9	0.9	1.00	0.38	12.0
Kristen Mann	16	0	5.9	0.9	0.4	0.19	0.00	1.6
Chasity Melvin	34	33	22.2	4.6	1.1	1.00	0.85	5.9
Bernice Mosby	24	0	7.0	1.5	0.1	0.33	0.04	1.9
Josephine Owino	0	0	0.0	0.0	0.0	0.00	0.00	0.0
Nakia Sanford	34	13	19.5	4.3	0.6	0.76	0.41	6.3

=== Team statistics ===
Team	FG%	3P%	FT%	RPG	APG	SPG	BPG	TO	PF	PPG
Washington Mystics	.423	.326	.701	35.0	13.3	9.2	3.5	17.8	21.3	76.0
Opponents	.433	.339	.755	32.7	15.4	9.3	4.6	16.9	22.9	77.1

== Awards and honors ==
- Alana Beard was named WNBA Eastern Conference Player of the Week for the week of June 22, 2009.
- Alana Beard was named WNBA Eastern Conference Player of the Week for the week of July 6, 2009.
- Alana Beard was named to the 2009 WNBA All-Star Team as an Eastern Conference starter.
- Crystal Langhorne was named the Most Improved Player.
- Alana Beard was named to the All-Defensive Second Team.
