= Julie Plank =

American basketball coach

Personal information
- Born: Columbus, Ohio, U.S.

Career information
- College: Ohio State
- Coaching career: 1984–2013

Career history

Coaching
- 1984–1986: Capital University (assistant)
- 1986–1995: Stanford (assistant)
- 1997–1999: Vanderbilt (assistant)
- 2000–2007: Indiana Fever (assistant)
- 2008: Minnesota Lynx (assistant)
- 2009–2010: Washington Mystics
- 2013: Atlanta Dream (assistant)

Julie Plank is an American basketball coach, most recently of the Atlanta Dream of the Women's National Basketball Association (WNBA).

== Career ==
Previously, Julie Plank was the head coach of the Washington Mystics for the 2009 and 2010 seasons. Plank joined the Mystics following a season with the Minnesota Lynx, assistant coaching Olympian Seimone Augustus and 2008 Sixth Player/Woman of the Year, Candice Wiggins. Prior to joining the Lynx coaching staff, Plank spent eight years with the Indiana Fever as an assistant coach and director of scouting. There she helped lead the team to four playoff appearances including the 2005 and 2007 Eastern Conference Finals.

Plank served as an assistant coach for the U.S. Women’s National Team from 1999 through the 2000 Olympic Games in Sydney, Australia and helped lead the U.S. to gold medal victories in the 1999 U.S. Olympic Cup and the 2000 Olympics.

Plank began her coaching career in 1984 at Capital University in Ohio. She spent two years as an assistant coach, helping Capital to a 39-8 record (.809). Overall, she has helped three different NCAA women’s basketball programs to a 343-104 record (.767)

Plank’s coaching career includes spending 10 years (1986–95) alongside Tara VanDerveer at Stanford University where she assisted the Cardinal to eight consecutive NCAA Tournaments (1988–1995), four Final Four appearances (1990–92, 1995) and two NCAA championships (1990, 1992). Plank also served as the lead assistant coach under Jim Foster at Vanderbilt University from 1997–99 and oversaw the school’s recruiting and scouting efforts. In 1998, she was ranked the fifth-best NCAA Division 1 assistant coach in the nation by Women’s Basketball Journal.

== Head coaching record ==
Team	Year	G	W	L	W–L%	Finish	PG	PW	PL	PW–L%	Result
Washington	2009	34	16	18	.471	4th in Eastern	2	0	2	.000	Lost in Conference semifinals
Washington	2010	34	22	12	.647	1st in Eastern	2	0	2	.000	Lost in Conference semifinals
Career		68	38	30	.559		4	0	4	.000	
