= Nikki Blue =

American basketball player (born 1984)

USC Trojans
- Title: Assistant coach
- League: Big Ten Conference

Personal information
- Born: March 29, 1984 (age 42) Bakersfield, California, U.S.
- Listed height: 5 ft 8 in (1.73 m)
- Listed weight: 163 lb (74 kg)

Career information
- High school: West (Bakersfield, California)
- College: UCLA (2002–2006)
- WNBA draft: 2006: 2nd round, 19th overall pick
- Drafted by: Washington Mystics
- Playing career: 2006–2010
- Position: Point guard
- Number: 32, 1
- Coaching career: 2008–present

Career history

Playing
- 2006–2009: Washington Mystics
- 2010: New York Liberty

Coaching
- 2008–2014: UNLV (assistant)
- 2014–2017: Cal State Bakersfield (assistant)
- 2017–2019: Grand Canyon (assistant)
- 2019–2022: Arizona State (assistant)
- 2022–2023: Phoenix Mercury (assistant)
- 2023: Phoenix Mercury (interim head coach)
- 2025–present: USC (assistant)

Career highlights
- 4× First-team All Pac-10 (2003–2006); Pac-10 All-Freshman Team (2002); McDonald's All-American (2002)
- Stats at WNBA.com
- Stats at Basketball Reference

Anitra Necole "Nikki" Blue (born March 29, 1984) is an American professional basketball coach and former player who is an assistant coach for the USC Trojans of the Big Ten Conference.

== High school ==
Born and raised in Bakersfield, California, Blue played her high school career at West High School. Blue set the CIF Central Section record for points scored in a single season (913 in the 2000–01 season) and career (2,934 points). Blue averaged 29 points per game her senior year at West and lead Kern County in assists per game as well. Blue is regarded as the best player to ever come out of the CIF Central Section. However, due to the lack of talent around her, West High never won a section championship during Blue's career. The closest West came was in 2002 when West lost to crosstown rival Stockdale 82–55 in the CIF Central Section Division II championship game. Blue was named a WBCA All-American. She participated in the 2001 WBCA High School All-America Game, where she scored two points.

== College ==
Blue was regarded as one of the best point guards in the country, and was offered a full-ride scholarship to the University of Connecticut, the nations top ranked team in 2002. However, Blue turned the offer down and instead opted to go to UCLA, which went 10–20 during the 2002 season. Blue stated that UCLA was closer to home and she liked the idea of rebuilding a program.

At UCLA, Blue was a four-year starting point guard. She was named first-team All-Pacific-10 Conference and to the All-Freshmen team. She averaged 16.6 points per game, 5.5 rebounds per game, 3.6 assist per game, and 2.7 steals per game her freshman year. As a sophomore, she was named first-team All-Pac-10 for the second straight year. As a junior, she joined Ann Meyers as the second Bruin to record over 1,300 points and 400 assists. She was one of the finalists for the Nancy Lieberman Award her senior year. Her career averages at UCLA were 15.2 points per game, 5.1 assist per game, 5.2 rebounds per game, and 2.8 steals per game.

== UCLA statistics ==
Legend
GP	Games played	GS	Games started	MPG	Minutes per game
FG%	Field goal percentage	3P%	3-point field goal percentage	FT%	Free throw percentage
RPG	Rebounds per game	APG	Assists per game	SPG	Steals per game
BPG	Blocks per game	PPG	Points per game	**Bold**	Career high

Year	Team	GP	Points	FG%	3P%	FT%	RPG	APG	SPG	BPG	PPG
2002-03	UCLA	29	**481**	40.5	27.9	70.4	5.5	3.6	2.7	**0.3**	16.6
2003-04	UCLA	30	457	39.6	37.5	**72.5**	**5.6**	4.9	3.0	0.1	15.2
2004-05	UCLA	27	458	**41.6**	35.0	72.0	5.0	**6.0**	**3.4**	0.2	**17.0**
2005-06	UCLA	**32**	401	39.6	**41.8**	70.5	4.7	5.9	2.1	0.2	12.5
Career	UCLA	118	1797	40.3	35.5	71.4	5.2	5.1	2.8	0.2	15.2

== WNBA career ==
After her college career, Blue was selected in the second round of the 2006 WNBA draft by the Washington Mystics. She played 4 seasons with the Mystics before being traded on May 13, 2010 to the New York Liberty in exchange for rookie Ashley Houts.

== Coaching career ==
Blue was hired by the Phoenix Mercury on March 31, 2022, as an Assistant Coach to be a part of new Head Coach Vanessa Nygaard's coaching staff. Blue was named the interim head coach for the Mercury after they fired Nygaard on June 25, 2023.

In January 2025, Blue was announced as an assistant coach for the Los Angeles Sparks under head coach Lynne Roberts. However, before the start of the WNBA season, in April, she was named an assistant coach for the USC Trojans under head coach Lindsay Gottlieb.

=== WNBA ===
Legend
Regular season	G	Games coached	W	Games won	L	Games lost	W–L %	Win–loss %
Playoffs	PG	Playoff games	PW	Playoff wins	PL	Playoff losses	PW–L %	Playoff win–loss %

Team	Year	G	W	L	W–L%	Finish	PG	PW	PL	PW–L%	Result
PHO	2023	28	7	21	.250	6th in Western	—	—	—	—	Missed Playoffs
Career		28	7	21	.250		0	0	0	–	

== WNBA career statistics ==
Legend
GP	Games played	GS	Games started	MPG	Minutes per game	RPG	Rebounds per game
APG	Assists per game	SPG	Steals per game	BPG	Blocks per game	PPG	Points per game
TO	Turnovers per game	FG%	Field-goal percentage	3P%	3-point field-goal percentage	FT%	Free-throw percentage
**Bold**	Career best	°	League leader

=== Regular season ===
Year	Team	GP	GS	MPG	FG%	3P%	FT%	RPG	APG	SPG	BPG	TO	PPG
2006	Washington	24	0	7.5	25.9	8.3	80.6	0.8	1.5	**0.8**	0.0	0.8	2.3
2007	Washington	**30**	1	14.0	**32.4**	22.2	**83.8**	**2.1**	1.6	0.7	**0.2**	1.2	3.6
2008	Washington	26	**22**	**20.7**	**32.4**	**43.8**	76.0	1.6	**2.8**	0.7	0.1	1.6	**3.8**
2009	Washington	16	0	5.7	29.2	33.3	70.0	0.6	0.8	0.4	0.0	0.8	1.5
2010	New York	15	0	5.1	28.6	16.7	71.4	0.4	0.9	0.3	0.0	**0.6**	1.2
Career	5 years, 2 teams	111	23	11.8	30.7	29.1	79.1	1.3	1.6	0.6	0.1	1.1	2.7

=== Playoffs ===
Year	Team	GP	GS	MPG	FG%	3P%	FT%	RPG	APG	SPG	BPG	TO	PPG
2006	Washington	1	0	**3.0**	0.0	0.0	0.0	**1.0**	0.0	**1.0**	0.0	0.0	0.0
2010	New York	1	0	1.0	0.0	0.0	0.0	0.0	0.0	0.0	0.0	0.0	0.0
Career	5 years, 2 teams	2	0	2.0	0.0	0.0	0.0	0.5	0.0	0.5	0.0	0.0	0.0

== Personal ==
Her full name is Anitra Necole Blue. She is the daughter to Sabrina Hunter and has one brother, Andre. She has served as an assistant coach in the UNLV women's basketball program for the past two years during her off-season from the WNBA. Her biggest thrill to date was being selected to play in the first McDonald's All-Star game in New York. She also lettered in volleyball (three years), softball (one year) and track and field (one year). She majored in history at UCLA.
