= Nakia Sanford =

American basketball player (born 1976)

Personal information
- Born: May 10, 1976 (age 50) Lithonia, Georgia
- Listed height: 6 ft 4 in (1.93 m)
- Listed weight: 190 lb (86 kg)

Career information
- High school: South Gwinnett (Snellville, Georgia)
- College: Kansas (1995–1999)
- WNBA draft: 1999: undrafted
- Position: Power forward / center
- Number: 43

Career history
- 2003–2010: Washington Mystics
- 2011–2012: Phoenix Mercury
- 2013: Seattle Storm
- Stats at WNBA.com
- Stats at Basketball Reference

Nakia Sanford (born May 10, 1976) is a professional women's basketball center most recently with the Seattle Storm of the Women's National Basketball Association (WNBA).

== College career ==
Sanford finished her career at Kansas ranked fourth all-time rebounder (832) and shot-blocker (89).

== Career statistics ==
=== WNBA ===
Legend
GP	Games played	GS	Games started	MPG	Minutes per game	RPG	Rebounds per game
APG	Assists per game	SPG	Steals per game	BPG	Blocks per game	PPG	Points per game
TO	Turnovers per game	FG%	Field-goal percentage	3P%	3-point field-goal percentage	FT%	Free-throw percentage
**Bold**	Career best	°	League leader

==== Regular season ====
Year	Team	GP	GS	MPG	FG%	3P%	FT%	RPG	APG	SPG	BPG	TO	PPG
2003	Washington	17	0	7.9	50.0	0.0	45.0	1.5	0.1	0.2	0.1	0.8	2.9
2004	Washington	31	29	21.1	50.0	0.0	57.3	5.0	0.6	0.6	0.5	1.2	5.5
2005	Washington	27	0	10.9	48.3	0.0	48.4	1.7	0.2	0.4	0.4	**0.6**	3.3
2006	Washington	**34**	19	26.1	51.9	0.0	61.6	6.0	1.1	**0.8**	0.6	2.1	8.9
2007	Washington	**34**	**31**	**29.2**	**53.0**	0.0	66.5	7.1	**0.7**	**0.8**	**0.8**	2.6	**11.0**
2008	Washington	**34**	28	23.4	45.2	0.0	39.8	5.7	1.2	0.6	0.3	2.4	6.7
2009	Washington	**34**	13	19.5	47.0	0.0	57.8	4.3	0.6	**0.8**	0.4	2.1	6.3
2010	Washington	**34**	22	17.9	47.8	0.0	69.7	4.2	0.7	0.7	0.2	2.0	6.0
2011	Phoenix	33	16	14.4	48.4	0.0	**75.0**	4.2	0.4	0.2	0.2	0.9	4.2
2012	Phoenix	30	15	16.7	42.5	**25.0**	60.0	3.3	0.6	0.5	0.3	1.3	4.1
2013	Seattle	15	0	10.2	29.6	0.0	56.3	2.0	0.5	0.1	0.3	0.8	1.7
Career	11 years, 3 teams	323	173	19.1	48.4	25.0	59.0	4.4	0.6	0.6	0.4	1.6	5.9

==== Playoffs ====
Year	Team	GP	GS	MPG	FG%	3P%	FT%	RPG	APG	SPG	BPG	TO	PPG
2004	Washington	3	**3**	20.7	**33.3**	0.0	**83.3**	6.3	0.0	0.7	0.3	2.3	4.3
2006	Washington	2	2	**30.0**	**33.3**	0.0	27.3	**8.0**	0.5	**1.5**	0.0	**1.0**	**6.5**
2009	Washington	2	0	17.5	71.4	0.0	0.0	2.5	**1.5**	0.0	0.5	**1.0**	5.0
2010	Washington	2	1	14.0	71.4	0.0	50.0	3.0	0.5	0.5	0.5	**1.0**	5.5
2011	Phoenix	**4**	0	20.0	63.6	0.0	50.0	4.5	0.3	0.3	**0.8**	**1.0**	4.8
Career	5 years, 2 teams	13	6	20.4	50.0	0.0	45.2	4.9	0.5	0.5	0.5	1.3	5.1

=== College ===
Legend
GP	Games played	GS	Games started	MPG	Minutes per game
FG%	Field goal percentage	3P%	3-point field goal percentage	FT%	Free throw percentage
RPG	Rebounds per game	APG	Assists per game	SPG	Steals per game
BPG	Blocks per game	PPG	Points per game	**Bold**	Career high

Year	Team	GP	Points	FG%	3P%	FT%	RPG	APG	SPG	BPG	PPG
1995–96	Kansas	32	209	49.4%	–	50.0%	6.6	0.5	**1.2**	0.8	6.5
1996–97	Kansas	31	225	48.6%	–	48.4%	**7.0**	0.5	1.2	**1.0**	7.3
1997–98	Kansas	32	212	43.2%	–	55.0%	6.1	**0.9**	0.6	0.6	6.6
1998–99	Kansas	**33**	**323**	**52.1%**	0.0%	**53.1%**	6.3	0.8	0.8	0.5	**9.8**
Career		128	969	48.7%	0.0%	51.9%	6.5	0.7	1.0	0.7	7.6

== WNBA career ==
Sanford was not drafted. She was signed by the Washington Mystics before the 2003 WNBA season. During her first three-season, she saw limited action. It was not until the 2006 WNBA season that Sanford began to show progress as a player. She set career highs for all her stats in 2006, including rebounds per game (6.0) and field goal percentage (52%). In 2007, she set new career highs averaging 7 rebounds and 11 points per game. She saw decreased playing time during the 2008 WNBA season, however.
