= Monique Currie =

American basketball player (born 1983)

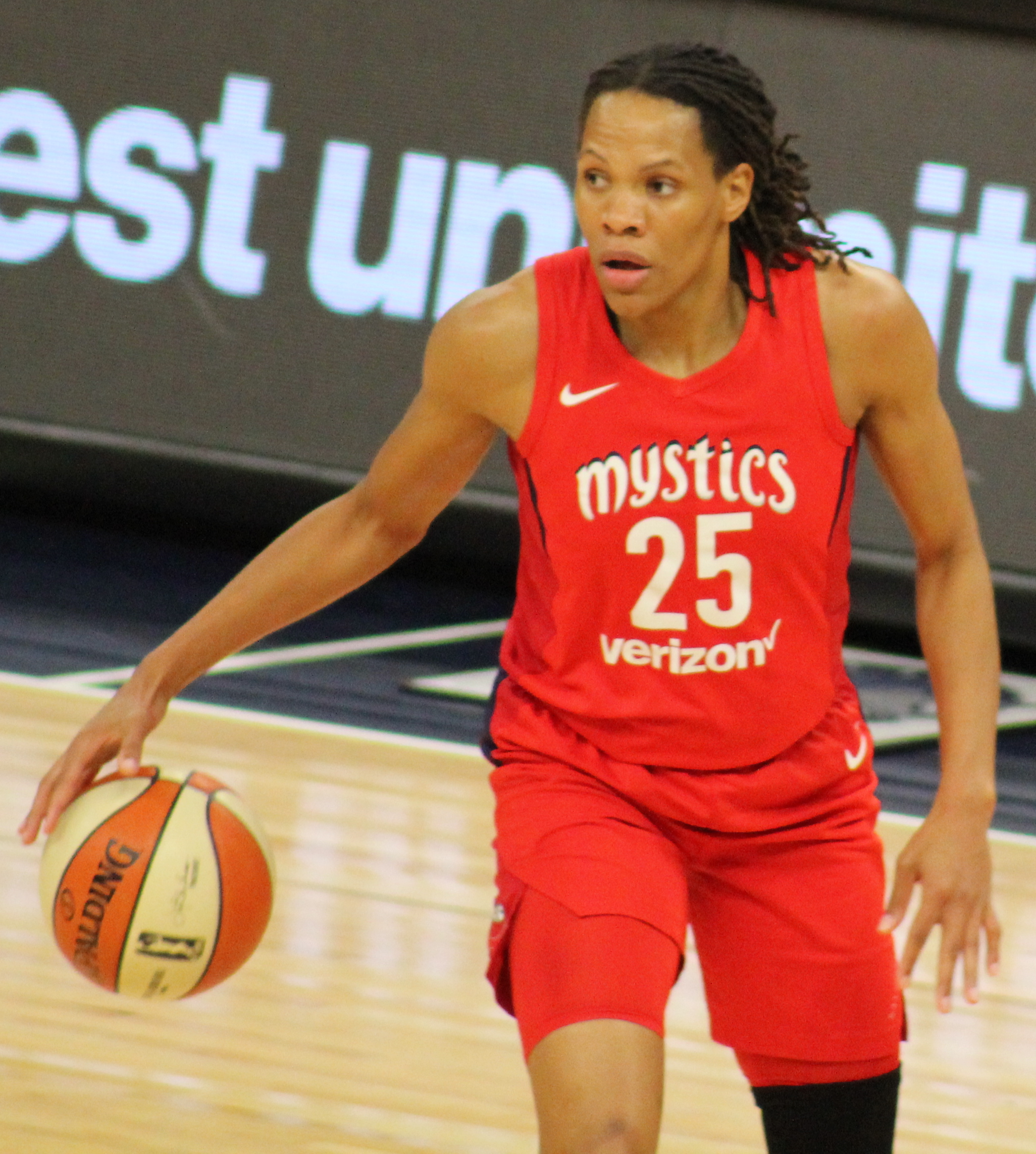

Personal information
- Born: February 25, 1983 (age 43) Washington, D.C., U.S.
- Listed height: 6 ft 0 in (1.83 m)
- Listed weight: 173 lb (78 kg)

Career information
- High school: Bullis School (Potomac, Maryland)
- College: Duke (2001–2006)
- WNBA draft: 2006: 1st round, 3rd overall pick
- Drafted by: Charlotte Sting
- Playing career: 2006–2018
- Position: Small forward
- Number: 25

Career history
- 2006: Charlotte Sting
- 2006–2007: Elitzur Ramla
- 2007: Chicago Sky
- 2007–2014: Washington Mystics
- 2010–2011: Galatasaray Medical Park
- 2011–2012: Homend Antakya
- 2012: CSM Târgovişte
- 2013: Perfumerias Avenida
- 2013-2014: Cheongju KB Stars
- 2014-2015: Yongin Samsung Life Blueminx
- 2015: Phoenix Mercury
- 2015-2016: Incheon Shinhan Bank S-Birds
- 2016: San Antonio Stars
- 2016-2017: Asan Woori Bank Woori Won
- 2017: Phoenix Mercury
- 2017-2018: Cheongju KB Stars
- 2018: Washington Mystics

Career highlights
- WNBA All-Rookie Team (2006); Second-team All-American – AP (2006); 2× Kodak All-American (2005, 2006); 2× All-American – United States Basketball Writers Association (2005, 2006); First-team All-American – AP (2005); 2× First-team All-ACC (2005, 2006); ACC Player of the Year (2005); ACC Tournament MVP (2002); ACC All-Freshman Team (2002)
- Stats at WNBA.com
- Stats at Basketball Reference
Medals
Women's basketball
Representing the United States
World University Games
Gold medal – first place	2005 İzmir	Team
FIBA Under-19 World Cup
Bronze medal – third place	2001 Czech Republic	Team

Monique Currie (born February 25, 1983) is an American former basketball player in the Women's National Basketball Association (WNBA). Born in Washington, D.C., Currie went to high school at the Bullis School in Potomac, Maryland, where she was a Gatorade All-American. Currie attended Duke University, where she became an All-American. Throughout her college career, she scored over 1,500 points. She was the third overall pick in the 2006 WNBA draft.

Currie was traded from the Chicago Sky during the 2007 season in exchange for Chasity Melvin. The Sky had selected her with the first pick of the 2007 WNBA dispersal draft from the roster of the defunct Charlotte Sting. Currie signed with the Phoenix Mercury on February 5, 2015. On February 1, 2018, Currie signed to return to the Washington Mystics, where she had previously spent 8 years of her WNBA career.

She retired on February 26, 2019, and will now work for Nike.

== Career statistics ==
=== WNBA career statistics ===
Legend
GP	Games played	GS	Games started	MPG	Minutes per game	RPG	Rebounds per game
APG	Assists per game	SPG	Steals per game	BPG	Blocks per game	PPG	Points per game
TO	Turnovers per game	FG%	Field-goal percentage	3P%	3-point field-goal percentage	FT%	Free-throw percentage
**Bold**	Career best	°	League leader

==== Regular season ====
Year	Team	GP	GS	MPG	FG%	3P%	FT%	RPG	APG	SPG	BPG	TO	PPG
2006	Charlotte	**34**	33	25.0	33.2	29.1	81.0	3.9	**2.6**	1.0	0.1	1.8	10.0
2007	Chicago	2	2	**30.5**	29.6	18.2	73.3	**6.0**	2.0	0.5	0.0	2.0	**14.5**
2007	Washington	31	22	24.9	**45.8**	40.0	79.1	3.9	1.7	0.7	0.2	1.5	10.5
2008	Washington	**34**	**34**	28.6	40.1	37.5	82.6	4.1	2.5	0.9	**0.4**	2.6	11.9
2009	Washington	**34**	**34**	21.4	35.9	38.5	80.3	4.3	1.8	0.9	**0.4**	1.7	8.2
2010	Washington	**34**	**34**	26.2	43.6	**44.6**	87.7	4.8	1.6	1.4	**0.4**	2.6	14.1
2011	Washington	4	1	19.3	42.9	12.5	**100.0**	4.3	1.0	**1.8**	0.0	2.5	11.8
2012	Washington	**34**	28	24.1	40.4	27.5	77.4	3.6	1.7	1.0	0.2	1.7	12.0
2013	Washington	**34**	**34**	25.9	40.1	34.4	81.4	5.0	1.5	1.1	0.2	1.8	10.5
2014	Washington	**34**	28	23.6	39.3	22.9	79.3	4.6	1.5	1.1	0.1	1.4	9.9
2015	Phoenix	**34**	**34**	21.3	41.1	36.4	86.4	3.2	1.5	0.9	**0.4**	1.3	8.4
2016	San Antonio	**34**	**34**	25.5	38.6	32.1	91.8	4.4	2.1	0.8	**0.4**	1.8	10.7
2017	San Antonio	14	3	23.1	43.4	35.9	82.5	4.8	2.1	0.6	**0.4**	2.4	11.8
2017	Phoenix	22	7	20.9	42.4	42.4	82.4	3.0	2.2	0.8	0.3	**1.0**	10.2
2018	Washington	32	9	15.9	39.5	29.3	83.1	3.0	0.8	0.4	0.2	1.2	6.6
Career	13 years, 5 teams	411	337	23.7	40.1	33.8	82.3	4.1	1.8	0.9	0.3	1.8	10.3

==== Playoffs ====
Year	Team	GP	GS	MPG	FG%	3P%	FT%	RPG	APG	SPG	BPG	TO	PPG
2009	Washington	2	2	18.5	13.3	0.0	85.7	7.5	0.5	**2.0**	0.5	1.5	5.0
2010	Washington	2	2	**28.0**	16.7	20.0	76.5	**9.0**	1.0	1.0	0.0	1.5	10.0
2013	Washington	3	3	25.7	33.3	40.0	72.2	1.7	**2.7**	0.0	0.0	1.0	**11.7**
2014	Washington	2	2	22.0	**42.9**	0.0	60.0	5.0	0.0	0.5	**1.0**	0.5	7.5
2015	Phoenix	4	**4**	24.0	38.1	25.0	63.6	3.0	2.5	0.8	0.8	1.0	10.3
2017	Phoenix	**5**	0	16.0	32.0	**45.5**	**100.0**	3.2	2.2	0.6	0.4	1.2	4.6
2018	Washington	**5**	0	5.8	12.5	0.0	50.0	1.0	0.4	0.2	0.0	**0.4**	0.8
Career	7 years, 2 teams	23	13	18.2	30.2	28.6	71.9	3.5	1.5	0.6	0.3	1.0	6.4

Legend
GP	Games played	GS	Games started	MPG	Minutes per game
FG%	Field goal percentage	3P%	3-point field goal percentage	FT%	Free throw percentage
RPG	Rebounds per game	APG	Assists per game	SPG	Steals per game
BPG	Blocks per game	PPG	Points per game	**Bold**	Career high

Year	Team	GP	Points	FG%	3P%	FT%	RPG	APG	SPG	BPG	PPG
2001-02	Duke	35	502	**49.4**	23.5	77.1	6.0	2.6	1.4	0.7	14.3
2002-03	Duke	redshirt									
2003-04	Duke	34	417	47.5	23.8	75.5	6.1	3.0	1.6	**0.8**	12.3
2004-05	Duke	**36**	**630**	44.6	31.7	78.1	**7.1**	**3.4**	**2.1**	0.4	**17.5**
2005-06	Duke	35	573	47.5	**42.0**	**81.9**	5.8	2.8	1.4	0.3	16.4
Totals		140	2,122								

== USA Basketball ==
Currie was named to the USA Women's U19 team which represented the US in the 2001 U19 World's Championship, held in Brno, Czech Republic in July 2001. Currie scored 3.2 points per game, and helped the USA team to a 6–1 record and the bronze medal.

Currie also played on the team representing the US at the 2005 World University Games held in İzmir, Turkey. The team won all seven games to earn the gold medal. Currie scored 8.9 points per game.

== Overseas ==
- 2006-2007: (Israel) Elitzur Ramla
- 2010-2011: (Turkey) Galatasaray Medical Park
- 2011-2012: (Turkey) Homend Antakya
- 2012: (Romania) CSM Târgovişte
- 2013: (Spain) Perfumerias Avenida
