= Marissa Coleman =

American basketball player (born 1987)

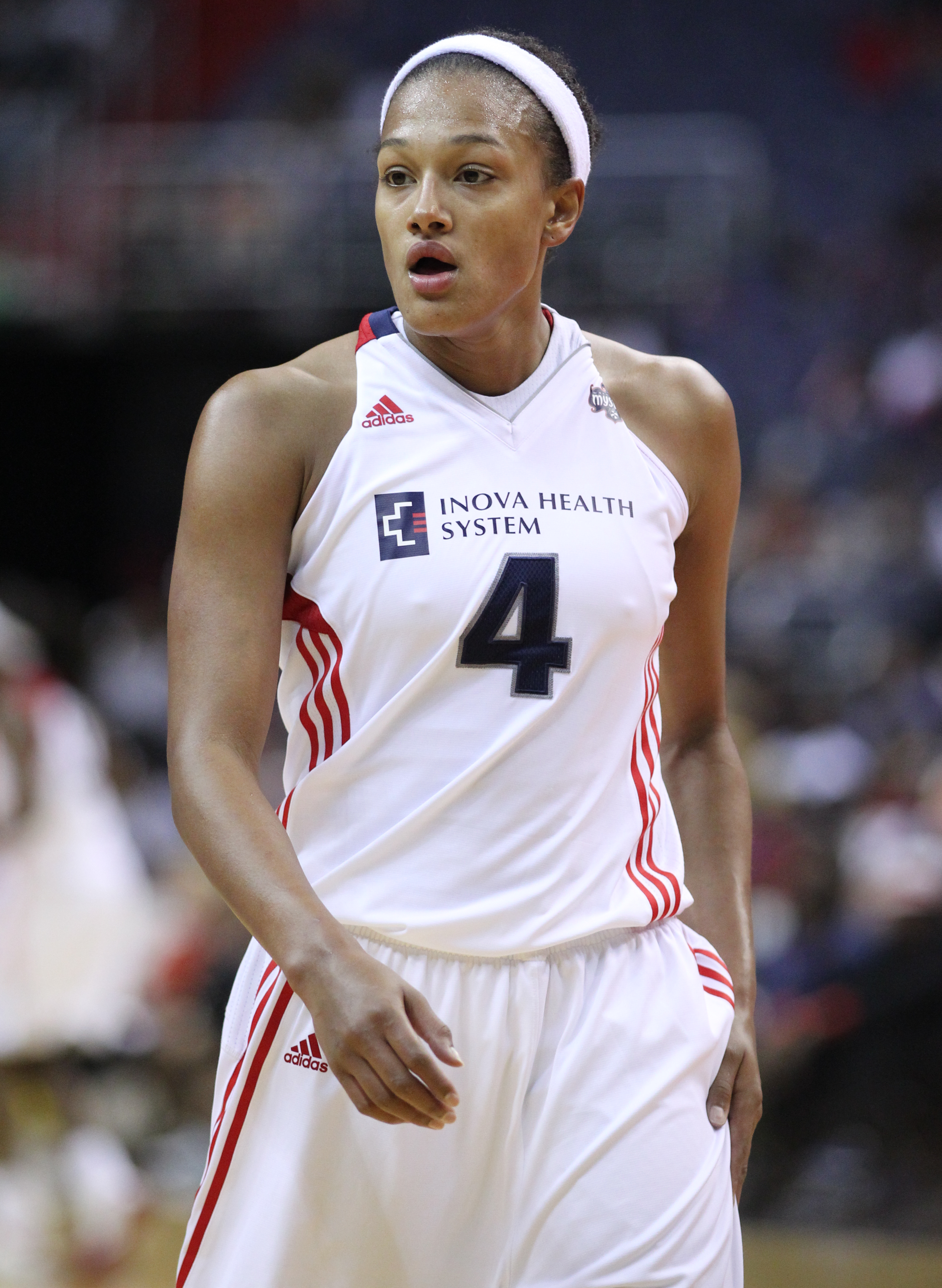

Personal information
- Born: January 4, 1987 (age 39) Portland, Oregon, U.S.
- Listed height: 6 ft 1 in (1.85 m)
- Listed weight: 160 lb (73 kg)

Career information
- High school: St. John's College HS (Washington, D.C.)
- College: Maryland (2005–2009)
- WNBA draft: 2009: 1st round, 2nd overall pick
- Drafted by: Washington Mystics
- Playing career: 2009–2020
- Position: Small forward / shooting guard

Career history
- 2009–2011: Washington Mystics
- 2012–2013: Los Angeles Sparks
- 2014–2017: Indiana Fever
- 2015–2016: Fenerbahçe Istanbul
- 2016–2019: Mersin
- 2018: New York Liberty
- 2019–2020: Tango Bourges Basket

Career highlights
- WNBA#2 overall pick (2009); WNBA All-Star (2015); WNBA All-Rookie Team (2009); Turkish League winner (2016); Turkish Cup winner (2016); Turkish Cup Finals MVP (2016); Turkish Super Cup winner (2015); NCAA champion (2006); All-American – State Farm Coaches', USBWA (2009); Second-team All-American – AP (2009); ACC Tournament MVP (2009); First-team All-ACC (2009); ACC Rookie of the Year (2006); ACC All-Freshman team (2006); McDonald's All-American (2005)
- Stats at WNBA.com
- Stats at Basketball Reference
Medals
Women's basketball
Representing the United States
Pan American Games
Gold medal – first place	2007 Brazil	Team
FIBA Under-19 World Cup
Gold medal – first place	2005 Tunisia	Team
FIBA Under-18 Americas Championship
Gold medal – first place	2004 Puerto Rico	Team

Marissa Coleman (born January 4, 1987) is an American former professional basketball player.

== Personal life ==
Coleman was born in Portland, Oregon to Tony and Joni Coleman. She has an older sister, LaTonya, and a younger brother, Anthony. Later they moved to Cheltenham, Maryland where Coleman attended high school at St. John's College High School, a co-ed Christian Brother's Catholic school in Washington, DC.

== High school career ==
Coleman went to high school at St. John's College High School. Coleman was a McDonald's and WBCA All-American, playing in both senior all-star games. She led all scorers with 19 points at the McDonald's game. She was selected East Team Most Valuable Player at the WBCA game.

== College career ==
Coleman chose the University of Maryland, College Park over the University of Tennessee, the University of Connecticut, the University of Florida, and Duke University. As a freshman, she became the second-straight Terrapin to be named ACC Rookie of the Year. She was only the ninth Terrapin all-time with 1,500 career points. She is one of only four Terps in the history of the program to receive All-ACC honors four times, earning a spot on the second team her Sophomore and Junior seasons and First-Team her Senior season. Coleman was a 1st-Team WBCA All-American in 2009. She is 2nd all-time at Maryland in rebounding and scoring. Finishing her career with over 2,000 points and 1,000 rebounds. She is one of only two players in school history to record a triple-double.

== Career statistics ==
Legend
GP	Games played	GS	Games started	MPG	Minutes per game	RPG	Rebounds per game
APG	Assists per game	SPG	Steals per game	BPG	Blocks per game	PPG	Points per game
TO	Turnovers per game	FG%	Field-goal percentage	3P%	3-point field-goal percentage	FT%	Free-throw percentage
**Bold**	Career best	°	League leader

=== WNBA ===
==== Regular season ====
Year	Team	GP	GS	MPG	FG%	3P%	FT%	RPG	APG	SPG	BPG	TO	PPG
2009	Washington	28	0	18.8	34.0	36.3	75.6	2.7	0.8	0.7	0.3	1.2	6.1
2010	Washington	**34**	1	19.5	39.7	**40.2**	75.6	3.3	1.5	0.9	**0.4**	1.2	6.5
2011	Washington	**34**	28	**27.0**	38.5	36.8	67.6	**4.8**	1.4	0.7	**0.4**	1.6	8.6
2012	Los Angeles	**34**	2	16.1	31.9	25.5	90.0	2.6	1.1	0.6	0.2	0.7	3.1
2013	Los Angeles	**34**	3	17.5	**43.0**	40.0	63.6	2.9	1.0	0.7	0.1	0.9	4.6
2014	Indiana	**34**	32	24.0	39.1	38.1	81.7	3.3	1.1	0.8	0.3	1.2	8.9
2015	Indiana	**34**	**34**	24.8	38.4	33.6	74.7	3.5	1.6	**1.2**	0.3	1.9	**10.4**
2016	Indiana	32	21	24.4	34.6	26.8	75.3	3.3	**2.0**	0.9	0.3	1.8	8.3
2017	Indiana	**34**	23	18.7	32.7	32.2	83.3	2.0	1.0	0.3	0.1	1.1	4.9
2018	Indiana	21	18	18.3	34.8	27.9	**100.0**	2.4	1.0	0.5	0.2	**0.6**	4.7
Career	10 years, 3 teams	319	162	21.0	37.1	34.2	76.2	3.1	1.3	0.7	0.3	1.2	6.7

==== Playoffs ====
Year	Team	GP	GS	MPG	FG%	3P%	FT%	RPG	APG	SPG	BPG	TO	PPG
2009	Washington	2	0	26.5	31.6	**50.0**	**100.0**	**5.0**	**1.5**	**2.0**	**2.0**	3.5	10.5
2010	Washington	2	0	25.0	40.0	30.0	80.0	4.0	1.0	1.0	0.0	0.5	**13.5**
2012	Los Angeles	4	0	7.8	33.3	33.3	**100.0**	0.8	0.3	0.3	0.0	**0.0**	2.0
2013	Los Angeles	3	0	17.0	27.3	0.0	66.7	1.3	1.0	1.3	0.3	1.7	3.3
2014	Indiana	5	5	23.0	41.0	33.3	50.0	3.2	0.0	1.0	0.0	1.0	8.2
2015	Indiana	**11**	**11**	**29.0**	40.3	41.2	70.0	2.5	0.9	1.1	0.4	0.9	11.9
2016	Indiana	1	1	**29.0**	**44.4**	40.0	**100.0**	2.0	1.0	1.0	0.0	1.0	13.0
Career	7 years, 3 teams	28	17	23.1	39.0	37.1	76.0	2.5	0.7	1.0	0.3	1.0	9.0

=== College ===
Legend
GP	Games played	GS	Games started	MPG	Minutes per game
FG%	Field goal percentage	3P%	3-point field goal percentage	FT%	Free throw percentage
RPG	Rebounds per game	APG	Assists per game	SPG	Steals per game
BPG	Blocks per game	PPG	Points per game	**Bold**	Career high

Year	Team	GP	Points	FG%	3P%	FT%	RPG	APG	SPG	BPG	PPG
2005-06	Maryland	**37**	510	**50.4**	**47.0**	**83.3**	8.1	3.1	1.3	**1.4**	13.8
2006-07	Maryland	34	448	49.1	34.0	80.2	7.5	3.2	1.1	0.9	13.2
2007-08	Maryland	**37**	594	46.1	36.2	81.0	7.4	2.9	1.4	0.8	16.1
2008-09	Maryland	36	**653**	48.3	37.8	80.0	**8.6**	**3.3**	**1.9**	0.8	**18.1**
Career	Maryland	144	2205	48.4	38.8	81.0	7.9	3.1	1.4	1.0	15.3

== USA Basketball ==
Coleman was a member of the USA Women's U18 team which won the gold medal at the FIBA Americas Championship in Mayaguez, Puerto Rico. The event was held in August 2004, when the USA team defeated Puerto Rico to win the championship. Coleman helped the team the gold medal, scoring 8.6 points per game.

Coleman continued with the team as it became the U19 team, and competed in the 2005 U19 World Championships in Tunis, Tunisia. The USA team won all eight games, winning the gold medal. Coleman scored 8.1 points per game.

Coleman played for the USA team in the 2007 Pan American Games in Rio de Janeiro, Brazil. The team won all five games, earning the gold medal for the event.

== WNBA career ==
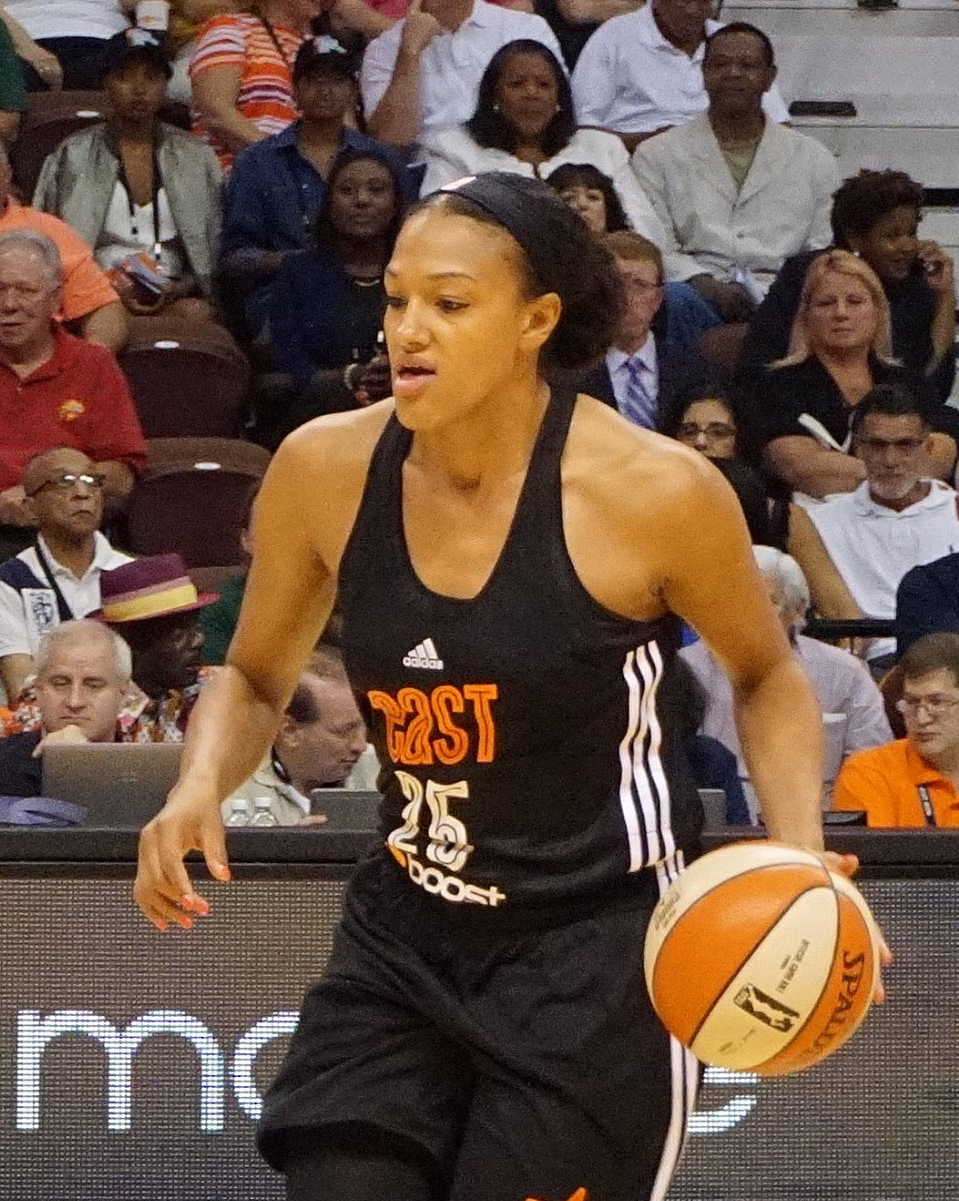
Marissa Coleman at 2015 All-Star game

Coleman was selected 2nd overall in the 2009 WNBA draft by the Washington Mystics.

On March 28, 2014, Coleman signed a multi-year contract with the Indiana Fever.

Coleman participated in the 2015 WNBA All-Star Game.

On May 1, 2018, Coleman signed with the New York Liberty.

== Europe ==
Edirnespor (2014-2015).

On July 13. 2015, Fenerbahçe Istanbul announced her transfer to the club.
