= Josephine Owino =

Kenyan basketball player (born 1983)

Personal information
- Born: 28 August 1983 (age 43) Mombasa, Kenya
- Listed height: 6 ft 3 in (1.91 m)

Career information
- College: Union (2005–2009)
- WNBA draft: 2009: 3rd round, 28th overall pick
- Drafted by: Washington Mystics
- Position: Center
- Stats at Basketball Reference

Josephine Owino (born 28 August 1983) is a Kenyan former professional basketball player.

Owino is from Mombasa and she went to the Mombasa High School and then played for Kenya Commercial Bank in the Kenyan league, before moving to the US she also played briefly for Kenya Ports Authority.

She played for Union University, Jackson, Tennessee from 2003 to 2009. The team participated that participate in the NAIA's TranSouth Athletic Conference (Division 1). She was selected NAIA's player of the year in 2008 and 2009. She has played for the Kenyan national team, debuting in 2000.

She was selected by Washington Mystics in the 2009 WNBA draft and became the first Kenyan player in WNBA.

She was waived by the Mystics three games into the season when a replacement needed to be signed for the injured Marissa Coleman. Owino never played in a regular season WNBA game.
