= 2010 WNBA season =

- League: Women's National Basketball Association
- Sport: Basketball
- Duration: May 15 – September 16, 2010
- Games: 34
- Teams: 12
- Total attendance: 1,598,174
- Average attendance: 7,834
- TV partner(s): ABC, ESPN, NBA TV

Draft
- Top draft pick: (United States) Tina Charles
- Picked by: Connecticut Sun

Regular season
- Top seed: Seattle Storm
- Season MVP: (Australia) Lauren Jackson (Seattle)
- Top scorer: (United States) Diana Taurasi (Phoenix)

Playoffs
- Finals champions: Seattle Storm
- Runners-up: Atlanta Dream
- Finals MVP: (Australia) Lauren Jackson (Seattle)

WNBA seasons
- ← 2009 2011 →

The 2010 WNBA season was the 14th season of the Women's National Basketball Association. The regular season began with a televised (ESPN2) meeting between the defending champion Phoenix Mercury and the Los Angeles Sparks in Phoenix, Arizona on May 15. The Connecticut Sun hosted the 10th Annual All-Star Game which was broadcast live on ESPN on July 10. This year, it was a contest between Geno Auriemma's USA Basketball team and a single team of WNBA All-Stars. The Finals was a series between the Seattle Storm and the Atlanta Dream which Seattle won 3–0.

== 2009–2010 WNBA offseason ==
- The new television deal with ESPN continued during the 2010 season (runs 2009–2016). For the first time ever, teams will be paid rights fees as part of this deal.
- As of the 2009 season, the maximum roster size per team was reduced from 13 to 11. Any team that falls below nine players able to play due to injury, pregnancy or any other factor outside of the control of the team will, upon request, be granted a roster hardship exception allowing the team to sign an additional player or players so that the team will have nine players able to play in an upcoming game or games. As soon as the injured (or otherwise sidelined) player(s) is able to play, the roster hardship player(s) – not any other player on the roster—must be waived.
- On September 29, 2009, Nolan Richardson was named head coach and general manager of a potential Tulsa, Oklahoma franchise.
- On October 20, 2009, the Detroit Shock announced that the franchise would relocate to Tulsa as well as move to the Western Conference.
- On November 20, 2009, the Sacramento Monarchs folded.
- On December 3, 2009, the New York Liberty announced that previously interim head coach Anne Donovan would be named head coach.
- On December 8, 2009, Cheryl Reeve was named head coach of the Minnesota Lynx.
- A dispersal draft was held on December 14, 2009, for all non-free agent Sacramento Monarchs players.
- On January 7, 2010, the Los Angeles Sparks named former player Jennifer Gillom head coach.
- On February 25, 2010, Sandy Brondello was named head coach of the San Antonio Silver Stars when Dan Hughes stepped aside from the position.

== Sacramento Monarchs dispersal draft ==
On December 14, 2009, the Sacramento Monarchs dispersal draft was held. This dispersal draft reassigned players from the Sacramento Monarchs who folded in November 2009, prior to the start of the 2010 WNBA season. The remaining twelve active teams in the WNBA each selected one player from the 2009 Monarchs roster in the one-round draft. Teams drafted in inverse order of their 2009 regular season finish. Three former Monarchs players, Kara Lawson, Hamchetou Maiga-Ba, and Ticha Penicheiro were unrestricted free agents and therefore not eligible for the draft. Teams selected based inversely on their 2009 regular season records. Four of the twelve teams making selections waived their picks.

The top four picks were:

| Pick | Player | Nationality | New Team | Ref. |
|---|---|---|---|---|
| 1 | Nicole Powell | United States | New York Liberty | |
| 2 | Rebekkah Brunson | United States | Minnesota Lynx | |
| 3 | DeMya Walker | United States | Connecticut Sun | |
| 4 | Courtney Paris | United States | Chicago Sky | |

== Draft ==
The WNBA Draft lottery was held on November 5, 2009. The lottery teams were the Sacramento Monarchs, Minnesota Lynx (from N.Y.), Minnesota Lynx, Connecticut Sun and Chicago Sky. The top pick was awarded to Minnesota. Since Sacramento folded after the lottery, all the teams following Sacramento in the draft simply moved up a pick. Minnesota subsequently traded the first overall pick to Connecticut.

The 2010 WNBA Draft was held on April 8, 2010, in Secaucus, New Jersey. Coverage of the first round was shown on ESPN2 (HD). Second and third round coverage was shown on ESPNU and NBA TV.

The top picks were:

1. Tina Charles, Connecticut Sun
2. Monica Wright, Minnesota Lynx
3. Kelsey Griffin, Minnesota Lynx
4. Epiphanny Prince, Chicago Sky
5. Jayne Appel, San Antonio Silver Stars

== Regular season ==
=== Standings ===
| Eastern Conference | W | L | PCT | GB | Home | Road | Conf. |
|---|---|---|---|---|---|---|---|
| Washington Mystics ^{x} | 22 | 12 | .647 | – | 13–4 | 9–8 | 13–9 |
| New York Liberty ^{x} | 22 | 12 | .647 | – | 13–4 | 9–8 | 14–8 |
| Indiana Fever ^{x} | 21 | 13 | .618 | 1.0 | 13–4 | 8–9 | 13–9 |
| Atlanta Dream ^{x} | 19 | 15 | .559 | 3.0 | 10–7 | 9–8 | 10–12 |
| Connecticut Sun ^{o} | 17 | 17 | .500 | 5.0 | 12–5 | 5–12 | 9–13 |
| Chicago Sky ^{o} | 14 | 20 | .412 | 8.0 | 7–10 | 7–10 | 7–15 |

| Western Conference | W | L | PCT | GB | Home | Road | Conf. |
|---|---|---|---|---|---|---|---|
| Seattle Storm ^{x} | 28 | 6 | .824 | – | 17–0 | 11–6 | 20–2 |
| Phoenix Mercury ^{x} | 15 | 19 | .441 | 13.0 | 9–8 | 6–11 | 13–9 |
| San Antonio Silver Stars ^{x} | 14 | 20 | .412 | 14.0 | 8–9 | 6–11 | 11–11 |
| Los Angeles Sparks ^{x} | 13 | 21 | .382 | 15.0 | 8–9 | 5–12 | 10–12 |
| Minnesota Lynx ^{o} | 13 | 21 | .382 | 15.0 | 7–10 | 6–11 | 8–14 |
| Tulsa Shock ^{o} | 6 | 28 | .176 | 22.0 | 4–13 | 2–15 | 4–18 |

=== All-Star Game ===
The 2010 WNBA All-Star Game was hosted by the Connecticut Sun on July 10 at Mohegan Sun Arena. Coverage of the game began at 3:30pm on ESPN. This marks the third time the Sun have hosted the annual event. Unlike in previous years, this game was a contest between Geno Auriemma's USA basketball team and a team of WNBA all-stars.

ESPN (HD)

July 10
3:30pm

Report

USA 99, WNBA 72
Scoring by quarter: 29–19, 20–9, 26–16, 24–28
| Pts: Fowles (23); Rebs: Dupree, Fowles, Moore (8); Asts: Pondexter (6) | Pts: Douglas (15); Rebs: Harding (7); Asts: Harding (4) |

Mohegan Sun Arena, Uncasville, Connecticut
Attendance: 9,518
Referees: Michael Price, Cameron Inouye, Kurt Walker

=== Statistic leaders ===
The following shows the leaders for each statistic during the 2010 regular season.

| Category | Player | Team | Statistic |
|---|---|---|---|
| Points per game | Diana Taurasi | Phoenix Mercury | 22.6 PPG |
| Rebounds per game | Tina Charles | Connecticut Sun | 11.7 RPG |
| Assists per game | Ticha Penicheiro | Los Angeles Sparks | 6.9 APG |
| Steals per game | Tamika Catchings | Indiana Fever | 2.26 SPG |
| Blocks per game | Sylvia Fowles | Chicago Sky | 2.59 BPG |
| Field goal percentage | Candice Dupree | Phoenix Mercury | 66.4% (231–348) |
| Three point FG percentage | Leilani Mitchell | New York Liberty | 48.6% (72–148) |
| Free throw percentage | Becky Hammon | San Antonio Silver Stars | 96.0% (97–101) |
| Points per game | Team Stat | Phoenix Mercury | 93.88 PPG |
| Least points allowed | Team Stat | Washington Mystics | 73.27 PPG |
| Field goal percentage | Team Stat | Phoenix Mercury | 47.3% |
| Least FG% allowed | Team Stat | Seattle Storm | 41.3% |

=== Schedule ===
2010 WNBA preseason
Preseason

| Date | Time (ET) | Matchup | | | TV | Result | High points | High rebounds | High assists | Location/Attendance |
|---|---|---|---|---|---|---|---|---|---|---|
| Thu April 8 | 3:00 | 2010 WNBA Draft: first round | | | ESPN2 | | | | | Secaucus, New Jersey |
| Thu April 8 | 4:00 | 2010 WNBA Draft: later rounds | | | ESPNU, NBA TV | | | | | Secaucus, New Jersey |
| Fri April 30 | 1:00 | Chicago | @ | Minnesota | | 87–78; CHI | Wright, Young (18) | Marginean (9) | Whitcomb (5) | Concordia University; 633 |
| Sat May 1 | 10:00 | China | @ | Los Angeles | | 78–58; LA | Junaid (15) | Mohammed (12) | Penicheiro (7) | Viejas Arena; 3,874 |
| Sun May 2 | 4:00 | Phoenix | @ | Seattle | | 77–58; SEA | Williams (19) | Paris (9) | Lacey (5) | KeyArena; 4,912 |
| Tue May 4 | 11:00am | Atlanta | @ | Connecticut | | 86–79; CON | Charles (21) | Charles (9) | Price (5) | Mohegan Sun Arena; 3,779 |
| Tue May 4 | 8:00 | China | @ | San Antonio | | 91–57; SA | N/A | N/A | N/A | Incarnate Word; N/A |
| Wed May 5 | 11:30am | New York | @ | Washington | | 65–60; WAS | Coleman (15) | McWilliams-Franklin (11) | Mitchell (4) | Verizon Center; 7,152 |
| Thu May 6 | 12:30 | Minnesota | @ | Chicago | | 74–65; CHI | Kraayeveld (20) | 4 players (6) | Whalen (10) | Allstate Arena; N/A |
| Fri May 7 | 12:00 | Chicago | @ | Indiana | | 69–63; IND | Murphy (20) | Owino (11) | Battle (4) | Conseco Fieldhouse; 7,291 |
| Fri May 7 | 7:30 | Poland | @ | Connecticut | | 89–46; CON | Charles, Kotsopoulos (15) | Charles (9) | Montgomery (5) | Mohegan Sun Arena; 5,059 |
| Sat May 8 | 3:30 | San Antonio | @ | Los Angeles | | 86–77; SA | Snell (17) | Clark (7) | Bobbitt, Darling, Quinn (4) | Walter Pyramid; 1,521 |
| Sat May 8 | 10:00 | China | @ | Phoenix | | 106–78; PHO | Johnson (21) | Bonner, Liwei (7) | Zengyu (8) | US Airways Center; 2,393 |
| Sun May 9 | 2:00 | Washington | @ | Atlanta | | 77–58; WAS | Currie (16) | Atkinson, Langhorne (8) | 4 players (3) | Eblen Center; 2,219 |
| Sun May 9 | 2:00 | Seattle | @ | Tulsa | | 90–80; TUL | Jackson (15) | Black (8) | Lacy, Pierson, Wright (4) | BOK Center; N/A |
| Mon May 10 | 12:30 | Indiana | @ | Chicago | | 84–71; CHI | Murphy (15) | Davenport (8) | Canty (6) | Allstate Arena; N/A |
| Tue May 11 | 10:30am | Connecticut | @ | New York | | 89–84 (3OT); NY | Charles (22) | Charles, Walker (13) | Pondexter (8) | Madison Square Garden; 19,763 |

2010 WNBA regular season
May

| Date | Time (ET) | Matchup | | | TV | Result | High points | High rebounds | High assists | Location/Attendance |
|---|---|---|---|---|---|---|---|---|---|---|
| Sat 15 | 2:00 | Los Angeles | @ | Phoenix | ESPN2 | 78–77; PHO | Parker (24) | Parker (12) | Riley (4) | US Airways Center; 14,772 |
| Sat 15 | 3:30 | Chicago | @ | Connecticut | CN100 | 74–61; CON | Jekabsone-Zogota (18) | Charles, Griffin (10) | Christon (4) | Mohegan Sun Arena; 8,072 |
| Sat 15 | 7:00 | Washington | @ | Indiana | | 72–65; WAS | Currie (21) | Langhorne (8) | January (5) | Conseco Fieldhouse; 9,752 |
| Sat 15 | 8:00 | Atlanta | @ | San Antonio | FSSW | 75–70; ATL | Castro Marques (23) | de Souza (15) | Lehning (6) | AT&T Center; 9,409 |
| Sat 15 | 8:00 | Minnesota | @ | Tulsa | NBA TV; CST | 80–74; MIN | Houston (21) | Black (10) | Whalen (6) | BOK Center; 7,806 |
| Sun 16 | 4:00 | Chicago | @ | New York | NBA TV; CN100; MSG | 85–82; NY | Fowles (23) | Perkins (7) | Mitchell (9) | Madison Square Garden; 12,088 |
| Sun 16 | 7:00 | Washington | @ | Minnesota | FSNN | 87–76; WAS | Currie (27) | Langhorne, Melvin (9) | Whalen (7) | Target Center; 9,985 |
| Sun 16 | 7:00 | Indiana | @ | Atlanta | SSO | 66–62; ATL | Catchings (18) | de Souza (11) | Douglas, Miller (6) | Philips Arena; 7,337 |
| Sun 16 | 9:00 | Los Angeles | @ | Seattle | KONG | 81–67; SEA | Jackson (23) | Parker (11) | Penicheiro (6) | KeyArena; 9,686 |
| Wed 19 | 10:00 | Minnesota | @ | Seattle | KING | 79–76; SEA | Cash (24) | Anosike (10) | Bird (10) | KeyArena; 6,687 |
| Thu 20 | 12:30 | San Antonio | @ | Tulsa | NBA TV; FSSW; FSOK | 83–74; SA | Young (24) | Snow (15) | Hammon (7) | BOK Center; 4,636 |
| Fri 21 | 7:00 | New York | @ | Washington | | 77–61; WAS | Harding (21) | Langhorne (11) | Pondexter (8) | Verizon Center; 10,158 |
| Fri 21 | 7:00 | Connecticut | @ | Atlanta | NBA TV; CSN-NE; FSSO | 97–82; ATL | McCoughtry (32) | Lyttle (17) | Lehning (10) | Philips Arena; 4,092 |
| Sat 22 | 8:00 | Los Angeles | @ | San Antonio | NBA TV; FSSW | 88–81; SA | Milton-Jones (20) | Snow (12) | Milton-Jones (6) | AT&T Center; 7,862 |
| Sat 22 | 8:00 | Indiana | @ | Chicago | CN100 | 92–86 (OT); IND | Catchings (28) | Fowles (12) | Douglas, Murphy (6) | Allstate Arena; 6,477 |
| Sat 22 | 10:00 | Seattle | @ | Phoenix | | 95–89 (OT); SEA | Jackson (25) | Bonner (12) | Bird (8) | US Airways Center; 10,144 |
| Sun 23 | 3:00 | Washington | @ | Connecticut | | 80–65; CON | Langhorne (16) | Charles (8) | Harding (5) | Mohegan Sun Arena; 7,614 |
| Sun 23 | 4:00 | Atlanta | @ | New York | | 86–77; ATL | McCoughtry, Pondexter (21) | Bales, de Souza (10) | McCoughtry (6) | Madison Square Garden; 9,548 |
| Sun 23 | 6:00 | Chicago | @ | Indiana | CN100; FSI | 69–61; IND | Murphy (16) | Fowles, Murphy (9) | Douglas (4) | Conseco Fieldhouse; 7,665 |
| Sun 23 | 7:00 | Tulsa | @ | Minnesota | | 94–82; TUL | Houston (23) | Black (17) | Lacy (7) | Target Center; 6,822 |
| Tue 25 | 7:00 | Phoenix | @ | Tulsa | ESPN2 | 110–96; PHO | Taurasi (35) | Dupree (14) | Lacy, Taylor (7) | BOK Center; 4,100 |
| Tue 25 | 10:00 | Washington | @ | Seattle | | 82–76; SEA | Currie (24) | Jackson (7) | Bird (7) | KeyArena; 6,612 |
| Thu 27 | 7:30 | Minnesota | @ | Connecticut | | 105–79; CON | Montgomery (23) | Charles (10) | Lawson, Montgomery (6) | Mohegan Sun Arena; 6,401 |
| Thu 27 | 8:00 | Seattle | @ | Chicago | CN100 | 84–75; CHI | Fowles (19) | Jackson (11) | Bird, Canty (4) | Allstate Arena; 2,923 |
| Fri 28 | 8:00 | New York | @ | San Antonio | | 77–71; NY | Pondexter (21) | McCarville, Powell (7) | Hammon (8) | AT&T Center; 5,293 |
| Fri 28 | 10:00 | Atlanta | @ | Phoenix | | 96–93; ATL | Taurasi (30) | Lyttle (17) | Taylor (7) | US Airways Center; 7,986 |
| Fri 28 | 10:30 | Washington | @ | Los Angeles | PRIME | 81–75; LA | Parker (30) | Langhorne, Parker (10) | Harding (8) | Staples Center; 13,154 |
| Sat 29 | 8:00 | Chicago | @ | Minnesota | CN100 | 73–58; CHI | Fowles (18) | Brunson (9) | Canty, Prince (4) | Target Center; 6,129 |
| Sat 29 | 8:00 | Indiana | @ | Tulsa | NBA TV; FSOK | 79–74; TUL | Holt (16) | Black (11) | Catchings (7) | BOK Center; 4,005 |
| Sun 30 | 3:00 | Seattle | @ | San Antonio | | 84–56; SEA | Jackson (27) | Cash (8) | Bird (6) | AT&T Center; 4,924 |
| Sun 30 | 4:00 | Connecticut | @ | Washington | | 69–65; WAS | Currie (18) | Langhorne (16) | Harding (9) | Verizon Center; 8,602 |
| Sun 30 | 8:00 | Atlanta | @ | Los Angeles | | 101–82; ATL | Parker (33) | Lyttle (13) | Penicheiro (6) | Staples Center; 8,404 |

June

| Date | Time (ET) | Matchup | | | TV | Result | High points | High rebounds | High assists | Location/Attendance |
|---|---|---|---|---|---|---|---|---|---|---|
| Tue 1 | 7:30 | Phoenix | @ | Minnesota | ESPN2 | 92–82; MIN | Wright (32) | Brunson (15) | Anosike, Johnson, Whalen (5) | Target Center; 6,854 |
| Tue 1 | 9:30 | Atlanta | @ | Seattle | ESPN2 | 90–72; SEA | Jackson (32) | Jackson (10) | Bird (6) | KeyArena; 7,586 |
| Thu 3 | 7:00 | San Antonio | @ | Indiana | FSSW; FSI | 79–57; IND | Douglas (22) | Catchings (7) | Lawson-Wade (4) | Conseco Fieldhouse; 7,574 |
| Fri 4 | 7:00 | Chicago | @ | Atlanta | CN100; FSSO | 80–70; CHI | Fowles (19) | Fowles (9) | Christon (8) | Philips Arena; 2,515 |
| Fri 4 | 7:30 | New York | @ | Connecticut | | 75–68; CON | White (18) | Charles (15) | Lawson (6) | Mohegan Sun Arena; 6,493 |
| Fri 4 | 8:00 | Minnesota | @ | Tulsa | FSOK | 92–79; TUL | Brunson (23) | Black, Brunson (11) | Lacy (6) | BOK Center; 4,521 |
| Fri 4 | 10:00 | Los Angeles | @ | Phoenix | | 90–89; PHO | Parker (26) | Parker (12) | Penicheiro (10) | US Airways Center; 6,485 |
| Sat 5 | 7:00 | Atlanta | @ | Washington | | 86–79 (OT); ATL | de Souza, Langhorne, McCoughtry (23) | Lyttle (17) | Castro Marques, K. Miller (6) | Verizon Center; 8,986 |
| Sat 5 | 7:00 | New York | @ | Indiana | | 78–73; IND | Pondexter (21) | Sutton-Brown (8) | Catchings (9) | Conseco Fieldhouse; 8,090 |
| Sat 5 | 8:00 | Tulsa | @ | Chicago | CN100 | 95–70; CHI | Fowles (32) | Fowles (13) | Lacy (7) | Allstate Arena; 4,549 |
| Sat 5 | 11:00 | Seattle | @ | Los Angeles | NBA TV; FSW | 79–75; SEA | Parker (24) | Jackson (9) | Bird (6) | Home Depot Center; 6,026 |
| Sun 6 | 1:00 | San Antonio | @ | Connecticut | | 81–68; CON | Young (21) | Charles (11) | Lawson-Wade (9) | Mohegan Sun Arena; 6,292 |
| Sun 6 | 7:00 | Indiana | @ | Minnesota | FSNN | 89–51; IND | Catchings (27) | Brunson (12) | Anosike, Wiggins (3) | Target Center; 6,444 |
| Sun 6 | 9:00 | Phoenix | @ | Seattle | KONG | 97–74; SEA | Cash, Jackson, Little (16) | T. Smith (8) | Bird (11) | KeyArena; 7,827 |
| Tue 8 | 8:00 | New York | @ | Chicago | CN100 | 85–70; NYL | Pondexter (31) | McWilliams-Franklin (9) | 7 players (3) | Allstate Arena; 2,408 |
| Tue 8 | 10:30 | Phoenix | @ | Los Angeles | PRIME | 92–91; LAS | Parker (22) | Parker (12) | Johnson, Taylor, Quinn (7) | Staples Center; 7,993 |
| Thu 10 | 10:00 | Minnesota | @ | Phoenix | FSA | 99–88; PHO | Taurasi (31) | Brunson (12) | Johnson (10) | US Airways Center; 5,504 |
| Fri 11 | 7:30 | Atlanta | @ | New York | | 91–79; NYL | Pondexter (25) | Lyttle (14) | Pondexter (7) | Madison Square Garden; 8,332 |
| Fri 11 | 7:30 | Indiana | @ | Connecticut | CSN-NE | 86–77; CON | Montgomery (29) | Charles (12) | Douglas, Jekabsone-Zogota (5) | Mohegan Sun Arena; 7,603 |
| Fri 11 | 8:00 | Tulsa | @ | San Antonio | | 87–75; SAN | Holdsclaw (19) | Holdsclaw (11) | Lawson-Wade (9) | AT&T Center; 7,076 |
| Fri 11 | 8:30 | Washington | @ | Chicago | CN100 | 95–78; WAS | Harding (25) | Currie, Langhorne (8) | Currie, Harding (5) | Allstate Arena; 3,107 |
| Fri 11 | 10:00 | Los Angeles | @ | Seattle | KONG | 82–60; SEA | Jackson (17) | Jackson (9) | Bird (5) | KeyArena; 7,286 |
| Sat 12 | 7:00 | New York | @ | Washington | CSN-MA | 82–65; WAS | Pondexter, Currie (20) | Langhorne (9) | Currie (4) | Verizon Center; 8,492 |
| Sat 12 | 10:00 | Tulsa | @ | Phoenix | | 116–84; PHX | Dupree, Taurasi (18) | Hornbuckle (8) | Taylor (8) | US Airways Center; 6,580 |
| Sun 13 | 3:00 | San Antonio | @ | Atlanta | NBA TV; SSO | 90–83; ATL | Lyttle, Young (24) | Lyttle (12) | Lehning (8) | Philips Arena; 6,050 |
| Sun 13 | 3:00 | Minnesota | @ | Los Angeles | | 88–84; LAS | Milton-Jones (22) | Brunson (15) | Whalen (7) | Staples Center; 7,005 |
| Sun 13 | 6:00 | Connecticut | @ | Indiana | | 77–67; IND | Douglas (20) | Catchings (13) | Douglas, Jekabsone-Zogota (3) | Conseco Fieldhouse; 7,302 |
| Tue 15 | 8:00 | Atlanta | @ | Chicago | CN100 | 93–86; ATL | Castro Marques (31) | de Souza (13) | Lehning (9) | Allstate Arena; 3,292 |
| Thu 17 | 7:00 | Seattle | @ | Indiana | FSI | 72–65; IND | Jackson (17) | Jackson (9) | Cash, Douglas (4) | Conseco Fieldhouse; 7,520 |
| Fri 18 | 7:30 | Seattle | @ | New York | | 92–84; SEA | Pondexter (24) | Jackson (12) | Bird (10) | Madison Square Garden; 8,883 |
| Fri 18 | 8:00 | Tulsa | @ | Minnesota | | 78–67; MIN | Augustus (27) | Anosike (9) | Whalen (12) | Target Center; 6,953 |
| Fri 18 | 10:00 | San Antonio | @ | Phoenix | | 108–105; SAN | Taurasi (39) | Dupree (11) | Hammon (10) | US Airways Center; 6,147 |
| Fri 18 | 10:30 | Connecticut | @ | Los Angeles | | 78–75; CON | Charles (26) | Charles (19) | Penicheiro (8) | Staples Center; 8,852 |
| Sat 19 | 7:00 | Chicago | @ | Washington | NBA TV; CN100; CSN-MA | 65–61 (OT); WAS | Fowles, Smith (17) | Langhorne (10) | Sanford (6) | Verizon Center; 9,034 |
| Sat 19 | 7:00 | Atlanta | @ | Indiana | | 94–91; IND | McCoughtry, Marques (21) | Lyttle (20) | Catchings (6) | Conseco Fieldhouse; 8,187 |
| Sat 19 | 8:00 | Minnesota | @ | Tulsa | CST | 92–78; MIN | Wiggins (19) | Brunson (11) | Whalen (6) | BOK Center; 5,013 |
| Sun 20 | 6:00 | Connecticut | @ | Phoenix | NBA TV; FSA | 96–94; CON | Charles, Taurasi (24) | Charles (12) | Lawson (5) | US Airways Center; 6,068 |
| Sun 20 | 9:00 | San Antonio | @ | Seattle | NBA TV; FSSW | 82–61; SEA | Cash (22) | Jackson (14) | Wright (6) | KeyArena; 8,086 |
| Tue 22 | 7:30 | Minnesota | @ | New York | | 75–68; MIN | Brunson (21) | Brunson (13) | Pondexter (5) | Madison Square Garden; 7,537 |
| Tue 22 | 7:30 | Chicago | @ | Connecticut | CN100 | 86–77; CHI | Prince (19) | Charles (16) | Montgomery (6) | Mohegan Sun Arena; 6,981 |
| Wed 23 | 12:00 | Tulsa | @ | Atlanta | NBA TV; FSOK; SSO | 96–90; ATL | McCoughtry (29) | Black, Lyttle (12) | Marques (8) | Philips Arena; 9,598 |
| Thu 24 | 7:00 | Los Angeles | @ | Washington | CSN-MA | 68–53; WAS | Langhorne (27) | Langhorne (14) | Penicheiro (4) | Verizon Center; 8,160 |
| Fri 25 | 7:30 | Phoenix | @ | Connecticut | CSN-NE | 82–79; CON | Taurasi (26) | Charles (23) | Taurasi, Montgomery (6) | Mohegan Sun Arena; 9,518 |
| Fri 25 | 8:00 | New York | @ | Tulsa | CST | 92–78; NY | Mitchell (20) | Franklin (11) | Powell, Franklin (6) | BOK Center; 4,554 |
| Fri 25 | 8:30 | Washington | @ | Chicago | CN100 | 79–72; CHI | Langhorne (25) | Langhorne (13) | Perkins (5) | Allstate Arena; 3,419 |
| Fri 25 | 10:00 | Indiana | @ | Seattle | | 85–81; SEA | Douglas (29) | Jackson (7) | Wright (10) | KeyArena; 9,083 |
| Sat 26 | 8:00 | Minnesota | @ | San Antonio | NBA TV; FSSW | 80–66; SAN | Snow (23) | Brunson, Snow (9) | Hammon (10) | AT&T Center; 10,184 |
| Sun 27 | 3:00 | Los Angeles | @ | Atlanta | NBA TV; SSO | 89–81; ATL | Marques (25) | Jones, Lyttle (11) | Penicheiro (10) | Philips Arena; 7,855 |
| Sun 27 | 4:00 | Connecticut | @ | New York | CSN-NE | 77–68; NY | Pondexter (19) | Charles (16) | Montgomery, Pondexter (5) | Madison Square Garden; 15,293 |
| Sun 27 | 4:00 | Seattle | @ | Tulsa | CST | 83–72; SEA | Jackson (24) | Little (9) | Wright (10) | BOK Center; 4,865 |
| Sun 27 | 4:00 | Phoenix | @ | Washington | NBA TV; CSN-MA | 95–85; WAS | Langhorne (31) | Langhorne (10) | Smith (6) | Verizon Center; 7,547 |
| Sun 27 | 6:00 | Indiana | @ | Chicago | CN100 | 70–64; IND | Thorn (15) | Fowles (17) | Catchings, Douglas (4) | Allstate Arena; 4,051 |
| Tue 29 | 7:00 | Indiana | @ | Washington | ESPN2 | 68–65; WAS | Smith (21) | Langhorne (10) | Douglas (5) | Verizon Center; 8,464 |
| Tue 29 | 7:00 | Phoenix | @ | Atlanta | SSO | 94–88; ATL | Taylor (31) | Bonner, Leuchanka (9) | Johnson (12) | Philips Arena; 4,073 |
| Tue 29 | 8:00 | Connecticut | @ | Tulsa | CST | 101–89; CON | Robinson (19) | Charles (12) | Brown (7) | BOK Center; 3,649 |
| Tue 29 | 10:00 | San Antonio | @ | Seattle | | 86–72; SEA | Jackson (31) | Jackson (15) | Wright (12) | KeyArena; 7,823 |
| Tue 29 | 10:30 | New York | @ | Los Angeles | NBA TV; PRIME | 80–68; NY | Quinn (24) | Powell, McCarville (7) | Pondexter, Mitchell (5) | Staples Center; 8,602 |

July

| Date | Time (ET) | Matchup | | | TV | Result | High points | High rebounds | High assists | Location/Attendance |
|---|---|---|---|---|---|---|---|---|---|---|
| Thu 1 | 7:00 | Minnesota | @ | Atlanta | SSO | 76–58; ATL | Marques (22) | Lyttle (14) | Shalee Lehning (5) | Philips Arena; 4,020 |
| Thu 1 | 8:00 | Connecticut | @ | Chicago | CN100 | 92–80; CHI | Fowles (26) | Fowles (11) | Montgomery, Bass, Canty (5) | Allstate Arena; 3,061 |
| Thu 1 | 10:00 | Washington | @ | Phoenix | FSA | 107–104; WAS | Smith (25) | Crystal Langhorne, Dupree (9) | Johnson (11) | US Airways Center; 5,509 |
| Thu 1 | 10:30 | San Antonio | @ | Los Angeles | | 73–63; LA | Thompson (24) | Thompson (10) | Lawson (5) | Staples Center; 7,803 |
| Sat 3 | 5:00 | Seattle | @ | Los Angeles | ESPN2 | 75–62; SEA | Jackson (20) | Thompson, Hylton (10) | Bird (7) | Staples Center; 9,319 |
| Sat 3 | 7:00 | Chicago | @ | Atlanta | NBA TV; CN100; SSO | 88–82; CHI | Fowles (22) | Souza (15) | Lyttle, Miller (3) | Philips Arena; 6,920 |
| Sat 3 | 8:00 | Washington | @ | Tulsa | CST | 69–54; WAS | Currie (17) | Coleman (10) | Smith, Harding, Coleman (4) | BOK Center; 3,516 |
| Sat 3 | 10:00 | New York | @ | Phoenix | | 97–82; PHO | Dupree (24) | Smith (10) | Mitchell, Taurasi (5) | US Airways Center; 6,780 |
| Tue 6 | 3:00 | New York | @ | Seattle | | 78–70; SEA | Franklin, Cash (20) | Cash (11) | Pondexter (5) | KeyArena; 11,012 |
| Tue 6 | 8:00 | Connecticut | @ | San Antonio | ESPN2 | 79–66; SA | Young (19) | Charles (13) | Snow (8) | AT&T Center; 7,264 |
| Tue 6 | 8:00 | Indiana | @ | Chicago | CN100 | 58–51; IND | Fowles (26) | Fowles (18) | January (5) | Allstate Arena; 3,732 |
| Tue 6 | 10:00 | Phoenix | @ | Los Angeles | ESPN2 | 98–89; PHO | Johnson (30) | Dupree (12) | Taurasi (7) | Staples Center; 8,336 |
| Wed 7 | 7:00 | Connecticut | @ | Atlanta | SSO | 108–103; ATL (OT) | McCoughtry, Marques (32) | Charles (20) | Lawson, Lehning (8) | Philips Arena; 5,305 |
| Thu 8 | 7:00 | Tulsa | @ | Indiana | | 100–72; IND | Catchings (24) | Black (12) | January (6) | Conseco Fieldhouse; 7,077 |
| Thu 8 | 8:00 | San Antonio | @ | Minnesota | | 89–66; MIN | Brunson (24) | Brunson (10) | Darling, Augustus, Whalen (5) | Target Center; 7,182 |
| Sat 10 | 3:30 | USA | @ | WNBA | ESPN | 99–72; USA | Fowles (23) | Fowles, Dupree, Moore (8) | Pondexter (6) | Mohegan Sun Arena; 9,518 |
| Sun 11 | 4:00 | Chicago | @ | New York | MSG | 57–54; NY | Pondexter (30) | Fowles (19) | McCarville (4) | Madison Square Garden; 9,644 |
| Tue 13 | 7:00 | Los Angeles | @ | Tulsa | ESPN2 | 87–71; LA | Thompson (24) | Braxton (10) | Penicheiro (9) | BOK Center; 7,073 |
| Wed 14 | 12:30 | San Antonio | @ | Chicago | CN100 | 88–61; CHI | Young, Fowles, Perkins, Prince (14) | Snow (8) | Canty, Prince (5) | Allstate Arena; 6,950 |
| Wed 14 | 1:00 | Atlanta | @ | Minnesota | | 83–81; MIN | McCoughtry (25) | Souza (20) | Whalen (7) | Target Center; 12,311 |
| Wed 14 | 1:00 | Connecticut | @ | Indiana | | 77–68; CON | Catchings (22) | Catchings (9) | Lawson (5) | Conseco Fieldhouse; 10,076 |
| Wed 14 | 3:30 | Seattle | @ | Phoenix | FSA | 111–107; SEA (3 OT) | Taurasi (44) | Jackson (18) | Bird (8) | US Airways Center; 13,508 |
| Thu 15 | 12:00 | Washington | @ | New York | | 75–67; NY | Langhorne (19) | McCarville (12) | Pondexter (7) | Madison Square Garden; 18,162 |
| Fri 16 | 7:00 | Atlanta | @ | Indiana | | 89–70; IND | McCoughtry (27) | Catchings (11) | Catchings, Douglas, January (4) | Conseco Fieldhouse; 7,532 |
| Fri 16 | 8:00 | Tulsa | @ | San Antonio | | 75–70; TUL | Holdsclaw (20) | Young (12) | Latta, Snow (4) | AT&T Center; 9,298 |
| Fri 16 | 8:30 | Los Angeles | @ | Chicago | CN100 | 80–68; CHI | Milton-Jones (21) | Fowles (10) | Penicheiro (9) | Allstate Arena; 4,841 |
| Sat 17 | 3:30 | Seattle | @ | Minnesota | | 73–71; SEA | Jackson (26) | Cash (11) | Wright (10) | Target Center; 7,216 |
| Sat 17 | 7:00 | Atlanta | @ | Connecticut | | 96–80; CON | McCoughtry (27) | Charles (14) | White (7) | Mohegan Sun Arena; 7,378 |
| Sat 17 | 10:00 | Tulsa | @ | Phoenix | | 97–88; PHO | Taylor (29) | Black (13) | Taurasi (8) | US Airways Center; 8,564 |
| Sun 18 | 3:00 | Los Angeles | @ | San Antonio | | 83–73; SAN | Hodges (24) | Thompson (8) | Hammon (7) | AT&T Center; 6,542 |
| Sun 18 | 4:00 | Indiana | @ | New York | MSG | 84–81; IND (OT) | Pondexter (40) | Catchings (10) | Catchings, Pondexter (7) | Madison Square Garden; 9,508 |
| Sun 18 | 4:00 | Chicago | @ | Washington | CSN-MA | 61–59; CHI | Fowles (13) | Fowles (11) | Harding (6) | Verizon Center; 8,790 |
| Tue 20 | 12:30 | Seattle | @ | San Antonio | NBA TV; FSSW | 80–74; SEA | Jackson (21) | Cash, Fowles, Young (7) | Hammon (10) | AT&T Center; 12,414 |
| Tue 20 | 3:00 | Tulsa | @ | Los Angeles | | 86–83; LA (OT) | Milton-Jones (23) | Jackson (9) | Penicheiro (13) | Staples Center; 14,413 |
| Tue 20 | 8:00 | New York | @ | Connecticut | ESPN2 | 82–74; NY (OT) | Pondexter (24) | Griffin (9) | Pondexter (6) | Mohegan Sun Arena; 6,478 |
| Wed 21 | 11:30am | Atlanta | @ | Washington | NBA TV; CSN-MA | 82–72; WAS | Langhorne (24) | Langhorne (15) | Castro Marques (6) | Verizon Center; 14,347 |
| Thu 22 | 7:00 | Los Angeles | @ | Indiana | ESPN2 | 76–57; IND | Thompson (19) | Hoffman, Milton-Jones, Thompson (8) | Catchings, Penicheiro (6) | Conseco Fieldhouse; 7,898 |
| Thu 22 | 8:00 | Phoenix | @ | Tulsa | CST | 123–91; PHO | Taurasi (26) | Jackson (9) | Johnson (7) | BOK Center; 3,333 |
| Thu 22 | 8:00 | San Antonio | @ | Minnesota | | 74–72; SA | Augustus (22) | Brunson (14) | Whalen (8) | Target Center; 6,126 |
| Fri 23 | 8:30 | New York | @ | Chicago | CN100 | 79–71; NY | McWilliams-Franklin (18) | Fowles (16) | Canty, Pondexter (6) | Allstate Arena; 5,256 |
| Sat 24 | 7:00 | Indiana | @ | Washington | NBA TV; CSN-MA | 78–73; IND | January (19) | Langhorne (13) | January (8) | Verizon Center; 9,786 |
| Sat 24 | 7:00 | Los Angeles | @ | Connecticut | CSN-NE | 89–80; LA | Milton-Jones (20) | Charles, Jones (9) | Milton-Jones, Penicheiro (7) | Mohegan Sun Arena; 8,097 |
| Sat 24 | 8:00 | Chicago | @ | San Antonio | CN100 | 75–72; CHI | Fowles (23) | Fowles (12) | Canty (6) | AT&T Center; 8,999 |
| Sat 24 | 8:00 | Phoenix | @ | Minnesota | NBA TV; FSNN | 127–124 (2OT); PHO | Augustus (36) | Brunson (17) | Whalen (10) | Target Center; 8,518 |
| Sun 25 | 3:00 | New York | @ | Atlanta | NBA TV; SSO | 82–75; ATL | McCoughtry (28) | de Souza, McCoughtry (10) | McCoughtry, Pondexter (6) | Philips Arena; 7,030 |
| Sun 25 | 9:00 | Tulsa | @ | Seattle | KONG | 75–59; SEA | Crossley (19) | Willingham (10) | Bird, Wright (6) | KeyArena; 9,686 |
| Tue 27 | 1:30 | Atlanta | @ | Tulsa | NBA TV; CST | 105-89; ATL | Castro Marques, Latta (23) | Lyttle (14) | Latta, Lehning (6) | BOK Center; 3,800 |
| Tue 27 | 7:00 | Chicago | @ | Indiana | CN100 | 78-74; IND | Fowles (18) | Catchings (10) | Tamika Catchings (6) | Conseco Fieldhouse; 6,853 |
| Tue 27 | 7:30 | San Antonio | @ | New York | ESPN2 | 77-72; NY | Holdsclaw (18) | Holdsclaw (9) | Mitchell (8) | Madison Square Garden; 10,712 |
| Tue 27 | 7:30 | Washington | @ | Connecticut | | 88-78; CON | Jones, Langhorne (23) | Charles, Currie (9) | Lawson (7) | Mohegan Sun Arena; 6,322 |
| Tue 27 | 8:00 | Los Angeles | @ | Minnesota | | 71-58; LA | Thompson (24) | Brunson (11) | Penicheiro (9) | Target Center; 6,215 |
| Tue 27 | 9:30 | Phoenix | @ | Seattle | ESPN2 | 91-85; SEA | Jackson (33) | Jackson (11) | Bird (7) | KeyArena; 8,044 |
| Thu 29 | 7:00 | San Antonio | @ | Washington | NBA TV; CSN-MA | 79-75; SA | Currie (22) | Langhorne (11) | Hammon (6) | Verizon Center; 9,212 |
| Thu 29 | 10:00 | Minnesota | @ | Phoenix | | 110-92; PHO | Houston (26) | Houston (13) | Johnson (8) | US Airways Center; 7,037 |
| Fri 30 | 7:00 | Washington | @ | Indiana | | 77-73; WAS | Harding (33) | Langhorne (11) | Catchings (7) | Conseco Fieldhouse; 8,207 |
| Fri 30 | 7:30 | Los Angeles | @ | New York | | 88-79; NY | Pondexter (20) | McWilliams-Franklin (9) | Penicheiro (7) | Madison Square Garden; 14,307 |
| Fri 30 | 7:30 | Atlanta | @ | Connecticut | | 94-62; ATL | McCoughtry (20) | de Souza (13) | Lawson, K. Miller, Price (5) | Mohegan Sun Arena; 7,003 |
| Fri 30 | 8:00 | San Antonio | @ | Tulsa | NBA TV; FSOK | 101-85; SA | Hammon (22) | Jackson, Snow (7) | Brown (5) | BOK Center; 5,203 |
| Fri 30 | 10:00 | Chicago | @ | Seattle | NBA TV; KONG | 80-60; SEA | Cash (16) | Bass, Little, Willingham (7) | Bird (8) | KeyArena; 7,749 |

August

| Date | Time (ET) | Matchup | | | TV | Result | High points | High rebounds | High assists | Location/Attendance |
|---|---|---|---|---|---|---|---|---|---|---|
| Sun 1 | 3:00 | Indiana | @ | Atlanta | NBA TV; SSO | 90-74; ATL | Catchings (24) | Davenport (12) | Lehning, McCoughtry (7) | Philips Arena; 6,270 |
| Sun 1 | 4:00 | Connecticut | @ | New York | MSG | 71-67; NY | Pondexter (24) | Charles (10) | Montgomery, Powell (5) | Madison Square Garden; 9,341 |
| Sun 1 | 4:00 | Tulsa | @ | Washington | NBA TV; CSN-MA | 87-62; WAS | Currie, Smith (15) | Coleman (10) | Coleman, Harding (4) | Verizon Center; 9,008 |
| Sun 1 | 6:00 | Chicago | @ | Phoenix | NBA TV; CN100; FSA | 97-96; PHO | Fowles, Taurasi (35) | Fowles (8) | Taurasi (11) | US Airways Center; 11,237 |
| Sun 1 | 7:00 | Seattle | @ | Minnesota | NBA TV; FSNN | 72-71; MIN | Augustus (24) | Brunson (8) | Bird (10) | Target Center; 7,312 |
| Tue 3 | 7:00 | New York | @ | Indiana | FSI | 82-72; NY | Powell (20) | McCarville (10) | Pondexter (5) | Conseco Fieldhouse; 7,540 |
| Tue 3 | 7:30 | Washington | @ | Atlanta | ESPN2 | 86-78; WAS | McCoughtry (30) | Langhorne (12) | Harding, Lehning (6) | Philips Arena; 9,072 |
| Tue 3 | 8:00 | Phoenix | @ | San Antonio | | 103-92; PHO | Dupree, Young (24) | Dupree (12) | Hammon (11) | AT&T Center; 6,116 |
| Tue 3 | 8:00 | Seattle | @ | Tulsa | CST | 84-75; TUL | Robinson (21) | Bird (7) | Latta, Wright (7) | BOK Center; 3,697 |
| Tue 3 | 8:00 | Connecticut | @ | Minnesota | CSN-NE | 111-103 (OT); MIN | Montgomery (33) | Charles (21) | Whalen (12) | Target Center; 5,954 |
| Wed 4 | 10:30 | Chicago | @ | Los Angeles | NBA TV; CN100 | 82-77; LA | Milton-Jones (22) | Wisdom-Hylton (13) | Penicheiro (15) | Staples Center; 9,732 |
| Thu 5 | 10:30 | Connecticut | @ | Seattle | ESPN2 | 83-82; SEA | Jackson (31) | Jones (9) | Montgomery (10) | KeyArena; 7,539 |
| Fri 6 | 7:00 | Atlanta | @ | Indiana | | 95-93; IND | McCoughtry (31) | Catchings, Lyttle (8) | Lehning (6) | Conseco Fieldhouse; 9,214 |
| Fri 6 | 7:30 | Washington | @ | New York | | 85-77; NY | Currie, Pondexter (23) | Currie, Melvin (6) | Mitchell (6) | Madison Square Garden; 11,465 |
| Fri 6 | 10:00 | San Antonio | @ | Phoenix | | 103-87; PHO | Hammon, Holdsclaw (21) | Holdsclaw (9) | Taylor (8) | US Airways Center; 12,909 |
| Fri 6 | 10:30 | Tulsa | @ | Los Angeles | | 77-70; LA | Milton-Jones (23) | Jackson (9) | Penicheiro (13) | Staples Center; 8,962 |
| Sat 7 | 3:00 | Minnesota | @ | Chicago | ESPN2 | 87-82 (OT); MIN | Augustus (27) | Fowles (11) | Whalen (7) | Allstate Arena; 4,992 |
| Sat 7 | 10:00 | Tulsa | @ | Seattle | KONG | 111-65; SEA | Abrosimova (20) | Jackson (10) | Abrosimova (8) | KeyArena; 9,686 |
| Sun 8 | 5:00 | Washington | @ | Connecticut | | 76-67; CON | Charles, Jones (17) | Charles (14) | Montgomery (7) | Mohegan Sun Arena; 7,076 |
| Sun 8 | 6:00 | Indiana | @ | Phoenix | | 104-82; IND | Douglas (28) | Catchings (10) | Taurasi (7) | US Airways Center; 10,995 |
| Sun 8 | 7:00 | New York | @ | Minnesota | NBA TV; FSNN | 74-72; NY | Powell (21) | Brunson (18) | Mitchell, Pondexter, Powell (4) | Target Center; 9,016 |
| Sun 8 | 8:00 | San Antonio | @ | Los Angeles | NBA TV; FSSW; FSW | 92-83; SA | Thompson (23) | Young (10) | Penicheiro (8) | Staples Center; 9,793 |
| Tue 10 | 7:00 | Connecticut | @ | Washington | NBA TV; CSN-MA | 84-74; WAS | Langhorne (23) | Charles (15) | Harding (6) | Verizon Center; 8,180 |
| Tue 10 | 7:00 | Seattle | @ | Atlanta | FSSO | 80-70; SEA | McCoughtry (16) | Lyttle (17) | Abrosimova, Lehning (6) | Philips Arena; 6,042 |
| Tue 10 | 8:00 | Minnesota | @ | San Antonio | | 73-68; MIN | Augustus (20) | Brunson (12) | Hammon (8) | AT&T Center; 5,142 |
| Tue 10 | 8:00 | Phoenix | @ | Chicago | | 91-82; CHI | Taurasi (28) | Fowles (14) | Taylor (6) | Allstate Arena; 4,089 |
| Tue 10 | 10:00 | Indiana | @ | Los Angeles | ESPN2 | 82-76; IND | Thompson (23) | Thompson (13) | Bevilaqua, Riley (6) | Staples Center; 10,586 |
| Thu 12 | 8:00 | Los Angeles | @ | Minnesota | | 78-77; LA | Houston (24) | Brunson (14) | Penicheiro (10) | Target Center; 7,867 |
| Fri 13 | 7:00 | Minnesota | @ | Washington | | 61-58; WAS | Harding (15) | Langhorne (14) | Whalen (5) | Verizon Center; 7,752 |
| Fri 13 | 7:00 | Phoenix | @ | Indiana | | 110-90; IND | Catchings (29) | Catchings (7) | Catchings (6) | Conseco Fieldhouse; 10,002 |
| Fri 13 | 7:00 | New York | @ | Atlanta | SSO | 90-83; NY | Pondexter (31) | Lyttle (13) | Lehning (8) | Philips Arena; 6,025 |
| Fri 13 | 7:30 | Seattle | @ | Connecticut | | 88-68; CON | Jones (19) | Gruda (9) | Abrosimova (6) | Mohegan Sun Arena; 9,197 |
| Fri 13 | 8:00 | Tulsa | @ | San Antonio | | 94-74; SA | Holdsclaw (18) | Kelly (9) | Hammon (8) | AT&T Center; 10,244 |
| Sat 14 | 7:30 | Phoenix | @ | New York | NBA TV; MSG | 107-69; NY | Pondexter (28) | Braxton, Dupree (8) | McCarville (6) | Madison Square Garden; 9,645 |
| Sat 14 | 8:00 | Los Angeles | @ | Tulsa | CST | 92-87; LA | Latta (26) | Jackson (13) | Penicheiro (9) | BOK Center; 5,719 |
| Sat 14 | 8:00 | Atlanta | @ | Chicago | CN100 | 98-74; ATL | Prince (18) | Bales (12) | Price (6) | Allstate Arena; 4,214 |
| Sun 15 | 4:00 | Seattle | @ | Washington | | 80-71; WAS | Currie (25) | Langhorne (7) | Bird (7) | Verizon Center; 9,438 |
| Sun 15 | 5:00 | Indiana | @ | Connecticut | | 79-66; IND | Catchings (26) | Charles (13) | Montgomery (8) | Mohegan Sun Arena; 7,915 |
| Sun 15 | 7:00 | San Antonio | @ | Minnesota | NBA TV; FSSW; FSNN | 84-78; MIN | Hammon (30) | Brunson, Houston (8) | Whalen (12) | Target Center; 8,678 |
| Tue 17 | 7:00 | Chicago | @ | Atlanta | NBA TV; FSSO | 84-79; CHI | Castro Marques (19) | Fowles (14) | Young (5) | Philips Arena; 5,209 |
| Tue 17 | 7:30 | Indiana | @ | New York | | 78-57; NY | Catchings (25) | McWilliams-Franklin (10) | Pondexter (6) | Madison Square Garden; 8,953 |
| Tue 17 | 7:30 | Tulsa | @ | Connecticut | CSN-NE | 90-62; CON | Montgomery (22) | Charles (10) | Charles (4) | Mohegan Sun Arena; 8,828 |
| Tue 17 | 8:00 | Washington | @ | San Antonio | | 76-66; WAS | Langhorne (21) | Langhorne (12) | Smith (6) | AT&T Center; 6,801 |
| Tue 17 | 10:00 | Minnesota | @ | Seattle | | 68-64; SEA | Jackson (24) | Little (14) | Bird (8) | KeyArena; 7,394 |
| Tue 17 | 10:30 | Phoenix | @ | Los Angeles | NBA TV; PRIME | 90-84; PHO | Thompson (33) | Dupree, Taylor (11) | Penicheiro (11) | Staples Center; 8,817 |
| Thu 19 | 7:30 | Tulsa | @ | New York | | 95-85; NY | Powell (20) | Black (9) | Mitchell (8) | Madison Square Garden; 8,766 |
| Fri 20 | 7:00 | New York | @ | Washington | | 75-74; WAS | Pondexter (28) | Langhorne (7) | Powell (5) | Verizon Center; 13,109 |
| Fri 20 | 8:00 | Indiana | @ | San Antonio | | 75-61; SA | Young (22) | Snow (8) | Snow, Hammon (6) | AT&T Center; 10,807 |
| Fri 20 | 8:30 | Connecticut | @ | Chicago | NBA TV; CN100 | 78-71; CON | Montgomery (20) | Griffin (11) | Canty (7) | Allstate Arena; 5,598 |
| Fri 20 | 10:00 | Seattle | @ | Phoenix | | 78-73; SEA | Braxton (15) | Bird, Bonner (7) | Bird (5) | US Airways Center; 12,459 |
| Fri 20 | 10:30 | Minnesota | @ | Los Angeles | | 98-91; LA | Thompson (26) | Thompson (9) | Penicheiro (12) | Staples Center; 13,154 |
| Sat 21 | 8:00 | Chicago | @ | Tulsa | NBA TV; FSOK | 84-71; TUL | Crossley, Jackson (17) | Jackson (9) | Canty, Latta (5) | BOK Center; 6,321 |
| Sat 21 | 11:00 | Los Angeles | @ | Seattle | ESPN2 | 75-74; SEA | Little (22) | Milton-Jones (9) | Bird (9) | KeyArena; 9,686 |
| Sun 22 | 3:00 | Phoenix | @ | San Antonio | | 83-82; SA | Hammon (30) | Bonner (12) | Hodges (6) | AT&T Center; 8,331 |
| Sun 22 | 3:00 | Washington | @ | Atlanta | SSO | 90-81; WAS | Currie (20) | Langhorne, Lyttle (11) | Harding (8) | Philips Arena; 9,570 |
| Sun 22 | 4:00 | Connecticut | @ | New York | MSG | 88-87 (OT); NY | Pondexter (31) | Charles (13) | Pondexter (6) | Madison Square Garden; 15,989 |
| Sun 22 | 5:00 | Minnesota | @ | Indiana | NBA TV; FSI | 83-79 (OT); MIN | Augustus (25) | Catchings (14) | January (7) | Conseco Fieldhouse; 10,015 |

2010 WNBA postseason
Conference Semifinals (August 25–September 1)

| Date | Time (ET) | Matchup | | | TV | Result | High points | High rebounds | High assists | Location/Attendance |
|---|---|---|---|---|---|---|---|---|---|---|
| Wed 25 | 8:00 | Atlanta | @ | Washington | NBA TV | 95-90; ATL | McCoughtry (28) | Currie (11) | Price (8) | Verizon Center; 10,322 |
| Wed 25 | 11:00 | Los Angeles | @ | Seattle | ESPN2 | 79-66; SEA | Cash (20) | Jackson (9) | Bird (12) | KeyArena; 10,589 |
| Thu 26 | 7:00 | Indiana | @ | New York | NBA TV; MSG | 85-73; NY | Pondexter (28) | McWilliams-Franklin (10) | McCarville (7) | Madison Square Garden; 14,624 |
| Thu 26 | 9:00 | San Antonio | @ | Phoenix | ESPN2 | 106-93; PHO | Dupree (32) | Young (9) | Taurasi (10) | US Airways Center; 8,927 |
| Fri 27 | 7:30 | Washington | @ | Atlanta | NBA TV; FSSO | 101-77; ATL | Castro Marques, McCoughtry (21) | Lyttle (10) | Lehning (9) | Philips Arena; 7,890 |
| Sat 28 | 1:00 | Phoenix | @ | San Antonio | ESPN2 | 92-73; PHO | Taurasi (23) | Dupree (11) | Taylor (12) | AT&T Center; 6,763 |
| Sat 28 | 3:00 | Seattle | @ | Los Angeles | ESPN2 | 81-66; SEA | Jackson (24) | Jackson (9) | Jackson, Cash (5) | Staples Center; 8,326 |
| Sun 29 | 8:00 | New York | @ | Indiana | ESPN2 | 75-67; IND | Pondexter (24) | Catchings (13) | Douglas (5) | Conseco Fieldhouse; 7,535 |
| Wed 1 | 7:30 | Indiana | @ | New York | NBA TV; MSG | 77-74; NY | Pondexter (30) | McWilliams-Franklin (11) | Douglas, McWilliams-Franklin, Mitchell; Pondexter (4) | Madison Square Garden; 16,682 |

Conference Finals (September 2–8)

| Date | Time (ET) | Matchup | | | TV | Result | High points | High rebounds | High assists | Location/Attendance |
|---|---|---|---|---|---|---|---|---|---|---|
| Thu 2 | 10:00 | Phoenix | @ | Seattle | NBA TV | 82-74; SEA | Jackson (23) | Jackson (17) | Bird (10) | KeyArena; 9,686 |
| Sun 5 | 3:00 | Seattle | @ | Phoenix | ABC | 91-88; SEA | Taurasi (28) | Cash, Jackson, Little (8) | Johnson (12) | US Airways Center; 9,010 |
| Sun 5 | 7:00 | Atlanta | @ | New York | NBA TV; MSG | 81-75; ATL | Pondexter (24) | Lyttle (13) | Mitchell (6) | Madison Square Garden; 14,248 |
| Tue 7 | 7:30 | New York | @ | Atlanta | NBA TV; FSSO; MSG | 105-93; ATL | McCoughtry (42) | de Souza, McWilliams-Franklin (6) | Pondexter (9) | Philips Arena; 9,045 |

WNBA Finals (September 12–21)

| Date | Time (ET) | Matchup | | | TV | Result | High points | High rebounds | High assists | Location/Attendance |
|---|---|---|---|---|---|---|---|---|---|---|
| Sun 12 | 3:00 | Atlanta | @ | Seattle | ABC | 79-77; SEA | Jackson (26) | Lyttle (14) | Bird (8) | KeyArena; 15,084 |
| Tue 14 | 9:00 | Atlanta | @ | Seattle | ESPN2 | 87-84; SEA | Jackson (26) | Little, McCoughtry (9) | C. Miller (8) | KeyArena; 13,898 |
| Thu 16 | 8:00 | Seattle | @ | Atlanta | ESPN2 | 87-84; SEA | McCoughtry (35) | de Souza (14) | Bird (7) | Philips Arena; 10,522 |

== Playoffs ==
**Conference semifinals** Best-of-3
E1 | Washington | 0
E4 | **Atlanta** | **2**
**Eastern Conference**
E2 | **New York** | **2**
E3 | Indiana | 1
W1 | **Seattle** | **2**
W4 | Los Angeles | 0
**Western Conference**
W2 | **Phoenix** | **2**
W3 | San Antonio | 0

**Conference finals** Best-of-3
E4 | **Atlanta** | **2**
E2 | New York | 0
W1 | **Seattle** | **2**
W2 | Phoenix | 0

**WNBA Finals**; Best-of-5
E4 | Atlanta | 0
W1 | **Seattle** | **3**

- **Bold** – Series winner
- Italics – Team with home-court advantage

== Awards ==
=== Individual ===
| Award | | Winner | Team | Position | Votes/Statistic |
|---|---|---|---|---|---|
| Most Valuable Player (MVP) | | Lauren Jackson | Seattle Storm | Forward | 323 out of 1002 |
| Finals MVP | | Lauren Jackson | Seattle Storm | Forward | |
| Rookie of the Year | | Tina Charles | Connecticut Sun | Center | 39 out of 39 |
| Most Improved Player | | Leilani Mitchell | New York Liberty | Guard | 29 out of 39 |
| Defensive Player of the Year | | Tamika Catchings | Indiana Fever | Forward | 30 out of 39 |
| Sixth Woman of the Year | | DeWanna Bonner | Phoenix Mercury | Guard/Forward | 16 out of 39 |
| Kim Perrot Sportsmanship Award | | Tamika Catchings | Indiana Fever | Forward | 10 out of 38 |
| Peak Performers | **Scoring** | Diana Taurasi | Phoenix Mercury | Guard/Forward | 22.6 PPG |
| Peak Performers | **Rebounding** | Tina Charles | Connecticut Sun | Center | 11.7 RPG |
| Peak Performers | **Assists** | Ticha Penicheiro | Los Angeles Sparks | Guard | 6.9 APG |
| Coach of the Year | | Brian Agler | Seattle Storm | Coach | 17 out of 39 |

=== Team ===
| Award | | Guard | Guard | Forward | Forward | Center |
|---|---|---|---|---|---|---|
| **All-WNBA** | **First Team** | Cappie Pondexter | Diana Taurasi | Tamika Catchings | Lauren Jackson | Sylvia Fowles |
| **All-WNBA** | **Second Team** | Sue Bird | Katie Douglas | Angel McCoughtry | Crystal Langhorne | Tina Charles |
| **All-Defensive** | **First Team** | Cappie Pondexter | Tanisha Wright | Tamika Catchings | Angel McCoughtry | Sylvia Fowles |
| **All-Defensive** | **Second Team** | Tully Bevilaqua; Katie Douglas | Lindsey Harding | Sancho Lyttle | Rebekkah Brunson | Lauren Jackson |
| **All-Rookie Team** | | Epiphanny Prince | Kalana Greene | Monica Wright | Kelsey Griffin | Tina Charles |

=== Players of the Week ===
| Week ending | Eastern Conference | | Western Conference | |
| Week ending | Player | Team | Player | Team |
|---|---|---|---|---|
| May 24 | Angel McCoughtry.(2) | Atlanta Dream | Lauren Jackson | Seattle Storm |
| June 2 | Angel McCoughtry.(2) | Atlanta Dream | Candace Parker | Los Angeles Sparks |
| June 7 | Sylvia Fowles | Chicago Sky | Lauren Jackson (2) | Seattle Storm |
| June 14 | Cappie Pondexter | New York Liberty | Diana Taurasi | Phoenix Mercury |
| June 21 | Tina Charles | Connecticut Sun | Seimone Augustus | Minnesota Lynx |
| June 28 | Crystal Langhorne | Washington Mystics | Lauren Jackson (4) | Seattle Storm |
| July 6 | Sylvia Fowles (2) | Chicago Sky | Lauren Jackson (4) | Seattle Storm |
| July 12 | Iziane Castro Marques | Atlanta Dream | Candice Dupree | Phoenix Mercury |
| July 19 | Tamika Catchings | Indiana Fever | Lauren Jackson (5) | Seattle Storm |
| July 26 | Cappie Pondexter (3) | New York Liberty | Diana Taurasi (3) | Phoenix Mercury |
| August 2 | Cappie Pondexter (3) | New York Liberty | Diana Taurasi (3) | Phoenix Mercury |
| August 9 | Tamika Catchings (2) | Indiana Fever | Lindsay Whalen | Minnesota Lynx |
| August 16 | Cappie Pondexter (5) | New York Liberty | Tina Thompson(2) | Los Angeles Sparks |
| August 23 | Cappie Pondexter (5) | New York Liberty | Tina Thompson(2) | Los Angeles Sparks |

=== Players of the Month ===
| Month | Eastern Conference | | Western Conference | |
| Month | Player | Team | Player | Team |
|---|---|---|---|---|
| May | Angel McCoughtry | Atlanta Dream | Lauren Jackson (3) | Seattle Storm |
| June | Crystal Langhorne | Washington Mystics | Lauren Jackson (3) | Seattle Storm |
| July | Tamika Catchings | Indiana Fever | Lauren Jackson (3) | Seattle Storm |
| August | Cappie Pondexter | New York Liberty | Tina Thompson | Los Angeles Sparks |

=== Rookies of the Month ===
| Month | Player | Team |
|---|---|---|
| May | Tina Charles (4) | Connecticut Sun |
| June | Tina Charles (4) | Connecticut Sun |
| July | Tina Charles (4) | Connecticut Sun |
| August | Tina Charles (4) | Connecticut Sun |

== Coaches ==
=== Eastern Conference ===
- Atlanta Dream: Marynell Meadors
- Chicago Sky: Steven Key
- Connecticut Sun: Mike Thibault
- Indiana Fever: Lin Dunn
- New York Liberty: Anne Donovan
- Washington Mystics: Julie Plank

=== Western Conference ===
- Los Angeles Sparks: Jennifer Gillom
- Minnesota Lynx: Cheryl Reeve
- Phoenix Mercury: Corey Gaines
- San Antonio Silver Stars: Sandy Brondello
- Seattle Storm: Brian Agler
- Tulsa Shock: Nolan Richardson

== See also ==
- WNBA
- WNBA draft
- WNBA All-Star Game
- WNBA Playoffs
- WNBA Finals
