= 2012 Washington Mystics season =

- Coach: Trudi Lacey
- Arena: Verizon Center
- Attendance: per game

Results
- Record: 5–29 (.147)
- Place: 6th (Eastern)
- Playoff finish: Did not qualify

Media
- Television: CSN-MA; ESPN2, NBATV

The 2012 WNBA season was the 15th season for the Washington Mystics of the Women's National Basketball Association.

== Transactions ==
=== WNBA draft ===
The following are the Mystics' selections in the 2012 WNBA draft.

Round	Pick	Player	Nationality	School/team/country
1	8 (from Atl.)	Natalie Novosel	United States	Notre Dame
1	10 (from Sea.)	LaSondra Barrett	United States	LSU
3	26	Anjale Barrett	United States	Maryland
3	35 (from Ind.)	Briana Gilbreath	United States	USC

=== Transaction log ===
- April 11, 2011: The Mystics traded a second-round pick in the 2012 Draft to the Atlanta Dream as part of the Lindsey Harding trade. The Mystics also received a first-round pick from Atlanta.
- April 11, 2011: The Mystics traded a first-round pick in the 2012 Draft to the Minnesota Lynx in exchange for Nicky Ansoike.
- April 29, 2011: The Mystics acquired a first-round pick in the 2012 Draft from the Seattle Storm and a third round-pick in the 2012 Draft from the Indiana Fever as part of the Katie Smith transaction.
- February 1: The Mystics traded Marissa Coleman to the Los Angeles Sparks in exchange for Noelle Quinn.
- February 9: The Mystics signed Michelle Snow.
- February 14: The Mystics traded Victoria Dunlap to the Seattle Storm in exchange for Ashley Robinson.
- February 15: The Mystics re-signed Kerri Gardin and signed Laura Harper and Ashley Walker.
- February 16: The Mystics re-signed Crystal Langhorne.
- February 21: The Mystics re-signed Monique Currie.
- February 22: The Mystics signed Dominique Canty.
- February 23: The Mystics traded Nicky Anosike to the Los Angeles Sparks in exchange for Natasha Lacy and LaToya Pringle.
- March 7: The Mystics re-signed Matee Ajavon.
- April 25: The Mystics signed draft picks LaSondra Barrett and Briana Gilbreath.
- April 27: The Mystics signed Rashanda McCants.
- April 28: The Mystics signed Tia Lewis, and draft picks Anjale Barrett and Natalie Novosel.
- May 3: The Mystics waived Tia Lewis.
- May 4: The Mystics waived Kerri Gardin.
- May 9: The Mystics waived Briana Gilbreath.
- May 14: The Mystics waived Laura Harper and Ashley Walker and signed Jessica Breland and Lindsay Wisdom-Hylton.
- May 17: The Mystics waived Rashanda McCants, LaSondra Barrett, and Jessica Breland, and suspended LaToya Pringle.
- June 13: The Mystics waived Dominique Canty and signed Shannon Bobbitt.
- August 26: The Mystics waived Natasha Lacy and signed Izi Castro Marques.

=== Trades ===
Date	Trade	
February 1, 2012	To Washington Mystics	To Los Angeles Sparks
February 1, 2012	Noelle Quinn	Marissa Coleman
February 14, 2012	To Washington Mystics	To Seattle Storm
February 14, 2012	Victoria Dunlap	Ashley Robinson
February 23, 2012	To Washington Mystics	To Los Angeles Sparks
February 23, 2012	Natasha Lacy and LaToya Pringle	Nicky Anosike

=== Personnel changes ===
==== Additions ====
Player	Signed	Former team
Noelle Quinn	February 1, 2012	Los Angeles Sparks
Michelle Snow	February 9, 2012	Chicago Sky
Ashley Robinson	February 14, 2012	Seattle Storm
Natalie Novosel	April 16, 2012	draft pick
Lindsay Wisdom-Hylton	May 14, 2012	free agent
Shannon Bobbitt	June 13, 2012	free agent
Izi Castro Marques	August 16, 2012	free agent

==== Subtractions ====
Player	Left	New team
Marissa Coleman	February 1, 2012	Los Angeles Sparks
Alana Beard	February 8, 2012	Los Angeles Sparks
Victoria Dunlap	February 14, 2012	Seattle Storm
Nicky Anosike	February 23, 2012	Los Angeles Sparks
Kelly Miller	February 24, 2012	New York Liberty
DeMya Walker	April 13, 2012	New York Liberty
Kerri Gardin	May 4, 2012	free agent

== Roster ==
2012 Washington Mystics roster
Players
Coaches

Pos.	No.	Nat.	Name	Height	Weight	DOB	From	Yrs
G	22	(Liberia)	Ajavon, Matee	5' 8" (1.73m)	160 lb (73kg)	1986-05-07	Rutgers	4
G	0	(United States)	Bobbitt, Shannon	5' 2" (1.57m)	130 lb (59kg)	1985-12-06	Tennessee	3
G/F	8	(Brazil)	Castro Marques, Izi	6' 0" (1.83m)	140 lb (64kg)	1982-03-13	Brazil	9
F	25	(United States)	Currie, Monique	6' 0" (1.83m)	177 lb (80kg)	1983-02-25	Duke	6
F/C	1	(United States)	Langhorne, Crystal	6' 2" (1.88m)	190 lb (86kg)	1986-10-27	Maryland	4
G	20	(United States)	Novosel, Natalie	5' 11" (1.8m)	165 lb (75kg)	1989-11-22	Notre Dame	R
G	45	(United States)	Quinn, Noelle	6' 0" (1.83m)	175 lb (79kg)	1985-01-03	UCLA	5
C	43	(United States)	Robinson, Ashley	6' 4" (1.93m)	180 lb (82kg)	1982-08-12	Tennessee	8
F/C	2	(United States)	Snow, Michelle	6' 5" (1.96m)	158 lb (72kg)	1980-03-20	Tennessee	10
G	5	(United States)	Thomas, Jasmine	5' 9" (1.75m)	145 lb (66kg)	1989-09-30	Duke	1
F	14	(United States)	Wisdom-Hylton, Lindsay	6' 2" (1.88m)	186 lb (84kg)	1986-05-26	Purdue	3

Head coach
(United States) Trudi Lacey (NC State)
Assistant coaches
(United States) Jennifer Gillom (Mississippi)
(United States) Marianne Stanley (Immaculata)
Athletic trainer
(United States) Navin Hettiarachchi (West Virginia)
Strength and conditioning coach
(United States) Michael Bugielski (Illinois State)

Legend

- (C) Team captain
- (DP) Unsigned draft pick
- (FA) Free agent
- (S) Suspended
- Injured

=== Depth ===
Pos.	Starter	Bench
C	Michelle Snow	Ashley Robinson; LaToya Pringle
PF	Crystal Langhorne	Lindsay Wisdom-Hylton
SF	Monique Currie	Noelle Quinn; Izi Castro Marques
SG	Matee Ajavon	Natalie Novosel
PG	Jasmine Thomas	Shannon Bobbitt

== Season standings ==
Eastern Conference	W	L	PCT	GB	Home	Road	Conf.
Connecticut Sun ^{y}	25	9	.735	–	12–5	13–4	18–4
Indiana Fever ^{x}	22	12	.647	3.0	13–4	9–8	15–7
Atlanta Dream ^{x}	19	15	.559	6.0	11–6	8–9	12–10
New York Liberty ^{x}	15	19	.441	10.0	9–8	6–11	10–12
Chicago Sky ^{o}	14	20	.412	11.0	7–10	7–10	8–14
Washington Mystics ^{o}	5	29	.147	20.0	4–13	1–16	3–19

== Schedule ==
=== Preseason ===
2012 Game Log: Preseason (May)

Game	Date	Time (ET)	Opponent	TV	Score	High points	High rebounds	High assists	Location/Attendance	Record
1	Thu 10	8:00	@ Chicago		68-73	Currie (12)	Langhorne; Snow (7)	Lacy; Quinn (3)	New Trier High School; 1,121	0-1
2	Mon 14	7:00	Connecticut		83-64	Currie (19)	Langhorne (13)	Lacy (6)	Verizon Center; 5,142	1-1

=== Regular season ===
2012 Game Log: Regular Season
May (1–2)

Game	Date	Time (ET)	Opponent	TV	Score	High points	High rebounds	High assists	Location/Attendance	Record
1	Sat 19	7:00	Chicago	CN100	57-69	Langhorne (16)	Langhorne (8)	Quinn (5)	Verizon Center; 11,415	0-1
2	Sat 26	7:00	Tulsa		64-61	Ajavon (19)	Langhorne (10)	Ajavon; Langhorne (3)	Verizon Center; 11,866	1-1
3	Wed 30	7:00	Minnesota	CSN-MA	77-79	Ajavon (20)	Robinson (5)	Lacy (4)	Verizon Center; 8,131	1-2

June (1–8)

Game	Date	Time (ET)	Opponent	TV	Score	High points	High rebounds	High assists	Location/Attendance	Record
4	Fri 1	8:30	@ Chicago	CN100	63-65	Currie (15)	Snow (9)	Ajavon; Lacy (4)	Allstate Arena; 4,078	1-3
5	Sun 3	3:00	@ Connecticut	CPTV-S	86-94	Langhorne (25)	Currie (8)	Ajavon; Currie (3)	Mohegan Sun Arena; 7,065	1-4
6	Fri 8	7:00	New York	CSN-MA	70-76	Langhorne (24)	Snow (12)	Ajavon; Quinn (4)	Verizon Center; 9,108	1-5
7	Fri 15	7:00	Indiana	CSN-MA	67-66	Langhorne (22)	Langhorne (13)	Bobbitt (5)	Verizon Center; 8,050	2-5
8	Mon 18	10:30	@ Los Angeles	TWC101	70-101	Snow (15)	Snow (7)	Thomas (5)	Staples Center; 8,612	2-6
9	Wed 20	10:00	@ Phoenix		77-80	Snow (21)	Snow (9)	Ajavon (7)	US Airways Center; 5,751	2-7
10	Sun 24	7:00	@ Seattle		55-72	Langhorne (21)	Langhorne; Snow (6)	Bobbitt (5)	KeyArena; 6,979	2-8
11	Tie 26	7:00	Seattle	ESPN2	71-79	Langhorne (20)	Langhorne (10)	Bobbitt (8)	Verizon Center; 6,645	2-9
12	Fri 29	7:00	Connecticut	CSN-MA; CPTV-S	64-77	Currie (21)	Snow (9)	Bobbitt (7)	Verizon Center; 6,975	2-10

July (2–4)

Game	Date	Time (ET)	Opponent	TV	Score	High points	High rebounds	High assists	Location/Attendance	Record
13	Sun 1	4:00	Phoenix	CSN-MA	90-77	Langhorne (22)	Snow (9)	Bobbitt (5)	Verizon Center; 10,789	3-10
14	Fri 6	7:00	San Antonio	NBATV; CSN-MA	73-78	Currie (15)	Wisdom-Hylton (6)	Currie (6)	Verizon Center; 6,522	3-11
15	Sun 8	4:00	@ Tulsa		62-78	Langhorne (13)	Lacy (6)	Ajavon; Thomas (4)	BOK Center; 4,003	3-12
16	Tue 10	11:30am	Connecticut	CSN-MA; CPTV-S	70-77	Langhorne (15)	Snow (11)	Bobbitt; Thomas (4)	Verizon Center; 12,569	3-13
17	Wed 11	7:00	@ Connecticut		73-85	Langhorne (19)	Snow (7)	Thomas (4)	Mohegan Sun Arena; 7,804	3-14
18	Fri 13	11:00am	@ New York		70-53	Langhorne (24)	Langhorne (6)	Ajavon (4)	Prudential Center; 14,715	4-14
Summer Olympic break

August (1–6)

Game	Date	Time (ET)	Opponent	TV	Score	High points	High rebounds	High assists	Location/Attendance	Record
Summer Olympic break
19	Thu 16	7:00	@ Indiana	NBATV	66-84	Currie (12)	Currie; Snow (7)	Currie (3)	Bankers Life Fieldhouse; 6,834	4-15
20	Fri 17	8:00	@ Minnesota	NBATV	69-98	Currie; Langhorne; Wisdom-Hylton (12)	Snow (9)	Novosel (4)	Target Center; 10,933	4-16
21	Sun 19	4:00	Chicago	NBATV; CSN-MA; CN100	75-71 (OT)	Ajavon (22)	Langhorne (8)	Thomas (8)	Verizon Center; 8,489	5-16
22	Tue 21	8:00	@ San Antonio	NBATV	72-75	Langhorne; Thomas (17)	Langhorne (6)	5 players (3)	AT&T Center; 5,913	5-17
23	Fri 24	7:00	Atlanta	NBATV; CSN-MA	69-81	Ajavon (20)	Langhorne (10)	Bobbitt; Novosel (4)	Verizon Center; 9,697	5-18
24	Tue 28	7:00	@ Indiana		68-83	Quinn (13)	Quinn; Langhorne (5)	Ajavon (4)	Bankers Life Fieldhouse; 6,525	5-19
25	Thu 30	7:00	@ Atlanta	SSO	59-82	Currie (14)	Langhorne; Wisdom-Hylton (7)	Langhorne; Thomas; Bobbitt (3)	Philips Arena; 3,381	5-20

September (0–9)

Game	Date	Time (ET)	Opponent	TV	Score	High points	High rebounds	High assists	Location/Attendance	Record
26	Sat 1	4:00	@ New York	NBATV; MSG	73-79	Currie (20)	Langhorne (8)	Currie (4)	Prudential Center; 6,245	5-21
27	Tue 4	7:00	Connecticut	CPTV-S	70-77	Langhorne (23)	Langhorne (9)	Thomas (5)	Verizon Center; 5,980	5-22
28	Fri 7	7:00	Los Angeles	CSN-MA	68-96	Currie (16)	Snow (7)	Currie (3)	Verizon Center; 7,468	5-23
29	Sun 9	3:00	@ Atlanta	SSO	68-93	Langhorne; Quinn (12)	Robinson (13)	Quinn; Thomas (3)	Philips Arena; 6,898	5-24
30	Wed 12	7:00	@ New York	MSG	62-75	Currie (24)	Langhorne (6)	Thomas (7)	Prudential Center; 5,717	5-25
31	Fri 14	7:00	Atlanta		74-82	Currie (20)	Robinson (7)	Ajavon (4)	Verizon Center; 7,368	5-26
32	Sun 16	4:00	New York	NBATV	68-75	Thomas (16)	Robinson (10)	Robinson (3)	Verizon Center; 8,087	5-27
33	Fri 21	7:00	Indiana	NBATV	53-66	Currie (16)	Robinson (7)	Wisdom-Hylton (4)	Verizon Center; 7,702	5-28
34	Sat 22	8:00	@ Chicago	NBATV; CN100	58-77	Currie (15)	Robinson (7)	Currie (4)	Allstate Arena; 6,721	5-29

All games are viewable on WNBA LiveAccess or ESPN3.com

== Statistics ==
Legend
GP	Games played	GS	Games started	MPG	Minutes per game	RPG	Rebounds per game
APG	Assists per game	SPG	Steals per game	BPG	Blocks per game	PPG	Points per game
FG%	Field-goal percentage	3P%	3-point field-goal percentage	FT%	Free-throw percentage	TO	Turnovers per game
PF	Fouls per game		Team leader		League leader

=== Regular season ===
Player	GP	GS	MPG	FG%	3P%	FT%	RPG	APG	SPG	BPG	PPG
