= 2011 Washington Mystics season =

- Head coach: Trudi Lacey
- Arena: Verizon Center

Results
- Record: 6–28 (.176)
- Place: 6th (Eastern)
- Playoff finish: Did not qualify

Media
- Television: CSN-MA; ESPN2, NBATV

The 2011 WNBA season was the 14th season for the Washington Mystics of the Women's National Basketball Association.

== Transactions ==
=== WNBA draft ===
The following are the Mystics' selections in the 2011 WNBA draft.

Round	Pick	Player	Nationality	School/team/country
1	11	Victoria Dunlap	United States	Kentucky
2	23	Karima Christmas	United States	Duke
3	35	Sarah Krnjic	Serbia	Serbia

=== Transaction log ===
- February 7: The Mystics signed Maurita Reid to a training camp contract.
- March 29: The Mystics signed Sequoia Holmes and Angel Robinson to training camp contracts.
- April 8: The Mystics signed Megan Frazee.
- April 8: The Mystics signed Bernice Mosby to a training camp contract.
- April 9: The Mystics traded their first-round 2012 draft pick to the Minnesota Lynx in exchange for Nicky Anosike.
- April 11: The Mystics traded Lindsey Harding and a second-round pick in the 2012 draft to the Atlanta Dream in exchange for Kelly Miller, draft rights to Ta'Shia Phillips and a first-round pick in the 2012 draft.
- April 29: The Mystics traded Katie Smith and Jacinta Monroe to the Seattle Storm in exchange for Jasmine Thomas and a first-round pick in the 2012 draft, and the Indiana Fever's third-round pick in the 2012 draft.
- May 2: The Mystics waived Bernice Mosby.
- May 17: The Mystics waived Sequoia Holmes and Maurita Reid.
- May 28: The Mystics waived Chasity Melvin and Angel Robinson.
- May 31: The Mystics waived Ashley Houts and Megan Frazee.
- June 9: The Mystics signed Kerri Gardin to an emergency hardship contract.
- June 20: The Mystics waived Kerri Gardin.
- June 23: The Mystics signed Joy Cheek to an emergency hardship contract.
- July 6: The Mystics waived Joy Cheek.
- July 7: The Mystics signed Kerri Gardin to an emergency hardship contract.
- July 21: The Mystics waived Ta'Shia Phillips and Karima Christmas.
- July 25: The Mystics signed DeMya Walker.

=== Trades ===
Date	Trade	
April 9, 2011	To Washington Mystics	To Minnesota Lynx
April 9, 2011	Nicky Anosike	first-round pick in 2012 draft
April 11, 2011	To Washington Mystics	To Atlanta Dream
April 11, 2011	Kelly Miller, Ta'Shia Phillips, first-round pick in 2012 draft	Lindsey Harding, second-round pick in 2012 draft
April 29, 2011	To Washington Mystics	To Seattle Storm
April 29, 2011	Jasmine Thomas, Seattle's first- and Indiana's third-round picks in 2012 draft	Katie Smith and Jacinta Monroe

=== Personnel changes ===
==== Additions ====
Player	Signed	Former team
Nicky Anosike	April 9, 2011	Minnesota Lynx
Victoria Dunlap	April 11, 2011	draft pick
Karima Christmas	April 11, 2011	draft pick
Ta'Shia Phillips	April 11, 2011	draft pick (from Atl.)
Kelly Miller	April 11, 2011	Atlanta Dream
Jasmine Thomas	April 29, 2011	draft pick (from Sea.)
Kerri Gardin	July 7, 2011	free agent
DeMya Walker	July 25, 2011	free agent

==== Subtractions ====
Player	Left	New team
Nakia Sanford	February 24, 2011	Phoenix Mercury
Lindsey Harding	April 11, 2011	Atlanta Dream
Katie Smith	April 29, 2011	Seattle Storm
Jacinta Monroe	April 29, 2011	Seattle Storm
Chasity Melvin	May 28, 2011	free agent
Ashley Houts	May 31, 2011	free agent
Karima Christmas	July 22, 2011	free agent
Ta'Shia Phillips	July 22, 2011	free agent

== Roster ==
2011 Washington Mystics roster
Players
Coaches

Pos.	No.	Nat.	Name	Height	Weight	DOB	From	Yrs
G	22	(Liberia)	Ajavon, Matee	5' 8" (1.73m)	160 lb (73kg)	1986-05-07	Rutgers	3
F/C	21	(United States)	Anosike, Nicky	6' 3" (1.91m)	210 lb (95kg)	1986-02-27	Tennessee	3
G/F	20	(United States)	Beard, Alana (injured)	5' 11" (1.8m)	160 lb (73kg)	1982-05-14	Duke	6
G/F	4	(United States)	Coleman, Marissa	6' 1" (1.85m)	160 lb (73kg)	1987-01-04	Maryland	2
F	25	(United States)	Currie, Monique (injured)	6' 0" (1.83m)	177 lb (80kg)	1983-02-25	Duke	5
F	34	(United States)	Dunlap, Victoria	6' 1" (1.85m)	160 lb (73kg)	1989-09-19	Kentucky	R
F	32	(United States)	Gardin, Kerri	6' 1" (1.85m)	168 lb (76kg)	1984-05-19	Virginia Tech	3
F/C	1	(United States)	Langhorne, Crystal	6' 2" (1.88m)	190 lb (86kg)	1986-10-27	Maryland	3
G	2	(United States)	Miller, Kelly	5' 10" (1.78m)	140 lb (64kg)	1978-09-06	Georgia	10
G	5	(United States)	Thomas, Jasmine	5' 9" (1.75m)	145 lb (66kg)	1989-09-30	Duke	R
F	11	(United States)	Walker, DeMya	6' 3" (1.91m)	200 lb (91kg)	1977-11-28	Virginia	11

Head coach
(United States) Trudi Lacey (NC State)
Assistant coaches
(United States) Laurie Byrd (Eastern Michigan)
(United States) Marianne Stanley (Immaculata)
Athletic trainer
(United States) Navin Hettiarachchi (West Virginia)
Strength and conditioning coach
(United States) David Emery (Purdue)

Legend

- (C) Team captain
- (DP) Unsigned draft pick
- (FA) Free agent
- (S) Suspended
- Injured

=== Depth ===
Pos.	Starter	Bench
C	Nicky Anosike	DeMya Walker
PF	Crystal Langhorne	Victoria Dunlap
SF	Marissa Coleman	Kerri Gardin; Monique Currie
SG	Matee Ajavon	Alana Beard
PG	Kelly Miller	Jasmine Thomas

== Season standings ==
Eastern Conference	W	L	PCT	GB	Home	Road	Conf.
Indiana Fever ^{x}	21	13	.618	–	13–4	8–9	13–9
Connecticut Sun ^{x}	21	13	.618	–	15–2	6–11	14–8
Atlanta Dream ^{x}	20	14	.588	1.0	11–6	9–8	14–8
New York Liberty ^{x}	19	15	.559	2.0	12-5	7–10	11–11
Chicago Sky ^{o}	14	20	.412	7.0	10–7	4–13	10–12
Washington Mystics ^{o}	6	28	.176	15.0	4–13	2–15	4–18

== Schedule ==
=== Preseason ===
2011 Game Log: Preseason

Game	Date	Time (ET)	Opponent	Score	High points	High rebounds	High assists	Location/Attendance	Record
1	May 25	10:30am	@ New York	60–57	Anosike (14)	Melvin (6)	Miller (5)	Prudential Center; 6,472	1-0
2	May 26	11:30am	Chicago	66–55	Langhorne (15)	Langhorne (9)	Thomas (3)	Verizon Center; 9,502	1–1

=== Regular season ===
2011 Game Log: Regular Season
June

Game	Date	Time (ET)	Opponent	TV	Score	High points	High rebounds	High assists	Location/Attendance	Record
1	June 4	7:00pm	@ Connecticut		73–89	Anosike; Langhorne (16)	Anosike (7)	Ajavon; Miller (4)	Mohegan Sun Arena; 6,666	0–1
2	June 9	7:00pm	@ Atlanta	ESPN2	98–90 (OT)	Langhorne (30)	Anosike; Langhorne (13)	Miller (5)	Philips Arena; 5,020	1–1
3	June 11	7:00pm	Chicago	CN100	77–84	Ajavon (24)	Coleman (6)	Ajavon; Miller (4)	Verizon Center; 11,943	1–2
4	June 16	7:00pm	Connecticut	CSN-MA	71–79	Miller (19)	Anosike (13)	Miller (5)	Verizon Center; 7,028	1–3
5	June 18	8:00pm	@ Tulsa		59–77	Coleman; Langhorne (12)	Langhorne (12)	Ajavon (4)	BOK Center; 4,423	1–4
6	June 21	7:00pm	Indiana	CSN-MA	80–89	Langhorne (23)	Langhorne (9)	Anosike (4)	Verizon Center; 7,980	1–5
7	June 28	4:00pm	Tulsa	CSN-MA	83–63	Langhorne (23)	Coleman (12)	Ajavon (6)	Verizon Center; 10,675	2–5

July

Game	Date	Time (ET)	Opponent	TV	Score	High points	High rebounds	High assists	Location/Attendance	Record
8	July 3	4:00pm	Seattle	NBATV; CSN-MA	63–73	Dunlap (19)	Anosike (10)	Ajavon; Miller (4)	Verizon Center; 11,604	2–6
9	July 5	8:00pm	@ Chicago	CN100	65–78	Coleman (14)	Anosike (10)	Thomas (4)	Allstate Arena; 3,187	2–7
10	July 9	7:00pm	@ Indiana		57–68	Anosike (12)	Coleman (9)	Miller (4)	Conseco Fieldhouse; 7,056	2–8
11	July 12	3:00pm	@ Seattle	NBATV	71–79	Coleman (16)	Coleman (9)	Ajavon (7)	KeyArena; 13,384	2–9
12	July 15	10:00pm	@ Phoenix	NBATV; FS-A	64–78	Langhorne (17)	Anosike (10)	Ajavon; Coleman; Miller (3)	US Airways Center; 9,075	2–10
13	July 17	8:30pm	@ Los Angeles	NBATV	89–85 (OT)	Ajavon (29)	Langhorne (14)	Langhorne (5)	Staples Center; 10,398	3–10
14	July 20	11:30am	Atlanta	NBATV	79–86	Langhorne (24)	Anosike (14)	Miller (6)	Verizon Center; 13,954	3–11
All-Star break
15	July 26	7:00pm	San Antonio	CSN-MA	67–73	Langhorne (19)	Anosike (8)	Thomas (5)	Verizon Center; 11,331	3–12
16	July 28	7:00pm	@ New York	MSG	71–75	Langhorne (18)	Langhorne (9)	Anosike; Coleman (3)	Prudential Center; 6,808	3–13
17	July 29	7:00pm	Indiana	NBATV; CSN-MA	59–61	Ajavon (19)	Walker (10)	Ajavon (4)	Verizon Center; 11,587	3–14

August

Game	Date	Time (ET)	Opponent	TV	Score	High points	High rebounds	High assists	Location/Attendance	Record
18	August 6	7:00pm	New York	NBATV	91-81	Ajavon (32)	Anosike; Langhorne (9)	Ajavon (5)	Verizon Center; 10,741	4–14
19	August 9	7:00pm	Atlanta	CSN-MA	70–72	Ajavon (28)	Coleman (10)	Anosike (4)	Verizon Center; 9,536	4–15
20	August 12	7:00pm	New York		64–63	Langhorne (18)	Anosike (11)	Ajavon; Coleman (3)	Verizon Center; 10,092	5–15
21	August 13	7:00pm	@ Connecticut		75–82	Langhorne (17)	Anosike (7)	Miller (6)	Mohegan Sun Arena; 6,717	5–16
22	August 16	7:00pm	@ New York		66–69	Langhorne (25)	Langhorne (6)	Ajavon (5)	Prudential Center; 6,223	5–17
23	August 18	7:00pm	Minnesota		62–81	Ajavon (15)	Coleman; Langhorne; Walker (5)	Miller (4)	Verizon Center; 9,483	5–18
24	August 20	7:00pm	Chicago	NBATV; CN100	70–71	Ajavon (23)	Anosike (9)	Ajavon; Thomas (4)	Verizon Center; 10,273	5–19
25	August 21	6:00pm	@ Indiana	NBATV; FS-I	51–83	Langhorne; Thomas (11)	Langhorne (7)	Ajavon (3)	Conseco Fieldhouse; 7,935	5–20
26	August 23	7:00pm	Los Angeles	CSN-MA	82–86 (OT)	Langhorne (28)	Langhorne (9)	Thomas (5)	Verizon Center; 8,441	5–21
27	August 26	8:30pm	@ Chicago	CN100	67–80	Langhorne (19)	Langhorne (9)	Langhorne (5)	Allstate Arena; 4,434	5–22
28	August 28	4:00pm	Phoenix	CSN-MA	79–86	Langhorne (27)	Langhorne (12)	Miller; Thomas (5)	Verizon Center; 11,614	5–23
29	August 30	8:00pm	@ Minnesota		56–73	Langhorne (13)	Anosike (7)	Thomas (3)	Target Center; 8,065	5–24

September

Game	Date	Time (ET)	Opponent	TV	Score	High points	High rebounds	High assists	Location/Attendance	Record
30	September 1	7:00pm	Atlanta		85–81	Langhorne (25)	Gardin; Langhorne (10)	Thomas (5)	Verizon Center; 7,954	6–24
31	September 2	7:30pm	@ Atlanta	NBATV	73-95	Thomas (19)	Walker (8)	Miller (4)	Philips Arena; 6,579	6–25
32	September 4	4:00pm	Connecticut	NBATV; CSN-MA	48–79	Currie (13)	Gardin (10)	Miller; Thomas (2)	Verizon Center; 13,403	6–26
33	September 7	7:00pm	@ Indiana	NBATV	69-87	Langhorne (18)	Langhorne (15)	Ajavon (3)	Conseco Fieldhouse; 8,514	6–27
34	September 10	8:00pm	@ San Antonio	NBATV	74–82	Ajavon (15)	Anosike; Langhorne (9)	Ajavon (5)	AT&T Center; 12,813	6–28

All games are viewable on WNBA LiveAccess or ESPN3.com

== Statistics ==
Legend
GP	Games played	GS	Games started	MPG	Minutes per game	RPG	Rebounds per game
APG	Assists per game	SPG	Steals per game	BPG	Blocks per game	PPG	Points per game
FG%	Field-goal percentage	3P%	3-point field-goal percentage	FT%	Free-throw percentage	TO	Turnovers per game
PF	Fouls per game		Team leader		League leader

=== Regular season ===
Player	GP	GS	MPG	FG%	3P%	FT%	RPG	APG	SPG	BPG	PPG
Matee Ajavon	34	33	31.3	.391	.276	.829	2.4	3.1	1.68	0.26	14.7
Nicky Anosike	34	29	27.2	.347	.000	.736	7.2	1.4	1.44	0.82	7.0
Alana Beard	0	0	0.0	.000	.000	.000	0.0	0.0	0.00	0.00	0.0
Joy Cheek	3	0	5.3	.250	.000	1.000	1.0	0.0	0.00	0.33	1.0
Karima Christmas	14	0	10.1	.310	.217	.696	1.2	0.1	0.60	0.10	3.4
Marissa Coleman	34	28	27.0	.385	.368	.676	4.8	1.4	0.71	0.41	8.6
Monique Currie	4	1	19.3	.429	.125	1.000	4.3	1.0	1.75	0.00	11.8
Victoria Dunlap	26	3	8.4	.439	.500	.471	1.7	0.4	0.69	0.19	2.3
Kerri Gardin	28	5	14.0	.237	.000	.517	2.7	1.0	0.86	0.46	1.5
Crystal Langhorne	31	31	34.3	.534	.125	.711	7.6	1.6	1.26	0.48	18.2
Kelly Miller	34	29	27.7	.382	.441	.789	2.3	2.8	0.68	0.24	7.4
Ta'Shia Phillips	10	0	5.4	.538	.000	.500	1.6	0.0	0.00	0.30	1.9
Jasmine Thomas	34	6	19.3	.353	.312	.667	2.1	1.9	0.74	0.26	6.4
DeMya Walker	20	5	20.5	.392	.000	.737	4.0	1.2	0.40	0.35	6.3

== Awards and honors ==
- Crystal Langhorne was named to the 2011 WNBA All-Star Team as a reserve.
