= 2012 Chicago Sky season =

- Head coach: Pokey Chatman
- Arena: Allstate Arena

Results
- Record: 14–20 (.412)
- Place: 5th (Eastern)
- Playoff finish: Did not qualify

Media
- Television: CN100; ESPN2, NBATV

The 2012 Chicago Sky season was the franchise's 7th season in the Women's National Basketball Association, and their second season under head coach Pokey Chatman.

== Transactions ==
=== WNBA draft ===
Round	Pick	Player	Nationality	School/team/country
2	23	Shey Peddy	United States	Temple
3	27	Sydney Carter	United States	Texas A&M

=== Trades and Roster Changes ===
Date	Transaction
January 2, 2012	Traded a First Round Pick in the 2012 WNBA draft to the Seattle Storm in exchange for Swin Cash, Le'Coe Willingham, and a Second Round Pick in the 2012 Draft
January 6, 2012	Extended Qualifying Offers to Sylvia Fowles and Tamera Young
January 10, 2012	Extended Qualifying Offers to Mistie Bass and Shay Murphy
February 6, 2012	Signed Shay Murphy
February 6, 2012	Signed Ruth Riley
February 20, 2012	Signed Tamera Young
February 22, 2012	Signed Ticha Penicheiro
February 28, 2012	Signed Felicia Chester to a training-camp contract
March 14, 2012	Traded a Second Round Pick in the 2013 WNBA draft to the San Antonio Silver Stars in exchange for the rights to Sonja Petrovic
March 24, 2012	Signed Sonja Petrovic to a rookie-scale contract
April 12, 2012	Signed Sylvia Fowles to a Multi-Year Deal
April 25, 2012	Signed Lykendra Johnson to a training-camp contract
May 2, 2012	Signed Shey Peddy and Sydney Carter to rookie-scale contracts
May 3, 2012	Waived Lykendra Johnson
May 11, 2012	Waived Lindsay Wisdom-Hylton
May 14, 2012	Waived Sydney Carter and Shey Peddy
May 16, 2012	Waived Felicia Chester
May 31, 2012	Exercised 4th-Year Team Option on Epiphanny Prince
June 18, 2012	Signed Sydney Carter to a Hardship Contract
June 27, 2012	Released Sydney Carter from her Hardship Contract

== Roster ==
2012 Chicago Sky roster
Players
Coaches

Pos.	No.	Nat.	Name	Height	Weight	DOB	From	Yrs
F	8	(United States)	Cash, Swin	6' 1" (1.85m)	176 lb (80kg)	1979-09-22	Connecticut	10
C	34	(United States)	Fowles, Sylvia	6' 6" (1.98m)	208 lb (94kg)	1985-10-06	LSU	4
G	7	(United States)	Murphy, Shay	5' 11" (1.8m)	161 lb (73kg)	1985-04-15	USC	5
G	21	(Portugal)	Penicheiro, Ticha	5' 11" (1.8m)	145 lb (66kg)	1974-09-18	Old Dominion	14
F	5	(Serbia)	Petrovic, Sonja	6' 1" (1.85m)	172 lb (78kg)	1989-02-18	Serbia	R
G	10	(United States)	Prince, Epiphanny	5' 9" (1.75m)	164 lb (74kg)	1988-01-11	Rutgers	2
F/C	00	(United States)	Riley, Ruth	6' 5" (1.96m)	198 lb (90kg)	1979-08-28	Notre Dame	11
C	30	(United States)	Swords, Carolyn	6' 6" (1.98m)	212 lb (96kg)	1989-07-19	Boston College	1
G	22	(United States)	Vandersloot, Courtney	5' 8" (1.73m)	132 lb (60kg)	1989-02-08	Gonzaga	1
F	43	(United States)	Willingham, Le'coe	6' 0" (1.83m)	206 lb (93kg)	1981-02-10	Auburn	8
F	1	(United States)	Young, Tamera	6' 2" (1.88m)	172 lb (78kg)	1986-10-30	James Madison	4

Head coach
(United States) Pokey Chatman (LSU)
Assistant coaches
(United States) Jeff House (Nazareth)
(United States) Christie Sides (Louisiana Tech)
Athletic trainer
(United States) Natalie Meckstroth (Indiana)
Strength and conditioning coach
(United States) Ann Crosby (Western Michigan)

Legend

- (C) Team captain
- (DP) Unsigned draft pick
- (FA) Free agent
- (S) Suspended
- Injured

=== Depth ===
Pos.	Starter	Bench
C	Sylvia Fowles	Carolyn Swords; Ruth Riley
PF	Swin Cash	Le'coe Willingham
SF	Tamera Young	Sonja Petrovic
SG	Epiphanny Prince	Shay Murphy
PG	Courtney Vandersloot	Ticha Penicheiro

== Schedule ==
=== Preseason ===
2012 Preseason Schedule
Total: 2–1 (Home: 1–0; Road: 1–1)

Game	Date	Time (ET)	Opponent	TV	Score	High points	High rebounds	High assists	Location/Attendance	Record
1	Thu 10	8:00	Washington		73-68	Epiphanny Prince (13)	Sylvia Fowles (12)	Courtney Vandersloot (7)	New Trier High School; 1,121	1-0
2	Mon 14	10:30am	@ New York		89-57	Epiphanny Prince (15)	Carolyn Swords (10)	Shey Peddy (4)	Prudential Center; 6,397	2-0
3	Tue 15	1:00	@ Minnesota		61-82	Tamera Young (11)	Sylvia Fowles (5)	Ruth Riley (4)	University of Minnesota; 4,102	2-1

=== Regular season ===
2012 Regular Season Schedule
May: 2–1 (Home: 0–1; Road: 2–0)

Game	Date	Time (ET)	Opponent	TV	Score	High points	High rebounds	High assists	Location/Attendance	Record
1	Sat 19	7:00	@ Washington	CN100	69-57	Sylvia Fowles (23)	Sylvia Fowles (12)	Prince; Willingham; Vandersloot (3)	Verizon Center; 11,415	1-0
2	Fri 25	8:30	Indiana	CN100	72-83	Sylvia Fowles (21)	Sylvia Fowles (10)	Courtney Vandersloot (4)	Allstate Arena; 6,198	1-1
3	Wed 30	8:00	@ San Antonio	CN100	77-63	Sylvia Fowles (23)	Sylvia Fowles (12)	Courtney Vandersloot (7)	AT&T Center; 7,233	2-1

June: 5–4 (Home: 3–2; Road: 2–2))

Game	Date	Time (ET)	Opponent	TV	Score	High points	High rebounds	High assists	Location/Attendance	Record
4	Fri 1	8:30	Washington	CN100	65-63	Epiphanny Prince (31)	Sylvia Fowles (16)	Vandersloot; Young (3)	Allstate Arena; 4,078	3-1
5	Sat 2	7:00	@ Atlanta	CN100; SSO	94-92 (OT)	Epiphanny Prince (33)	Sylvia Fowles (19)	Courtney Vandersloot (6)	Philips Arena; 4,503	4-1
6	Fri 8	8:30	Tulsa	CN100	98-91 (OT)	Epiphanny Prince (32)	Sylvia Fowles (21)	Cash; Prince; Vandersloot (5)	Allstate Arena; 5,019	5-1
7	Sun 10	4:00	@ New York	CN100; MSG	73-64	Epiphanny Prince (26)	Sylvia Fowles (12)	Courtney Vandersloot (5)	Prudential Center; 5,908	6-1
8	Wed 13	8:00	Seattle	CN100	74-58	Epiphanny Prince (17)	Sylvia Fowles (15)	Epiphanny Prince (7)	Allstate Arena; 4,681	7-1
9	Sat 16	7:00	@ Indiana	CN100	70-84	Sylvia Fowles (26)	Tamera Young (7)	Cash; Young (3)	Bankers Life Fieldhouse; 6,098	7-2
10	Sat 23	12:30	@ Minnesota	ESPN	67-79	Sylvia Fowles (22)	Sylvia Fowles (13)	Courtney Vandersloot (5)	Target Center; 9,267	7-3
11	Wed 27	12:30	Indiana		72-81	Sylvia Fowles (19)	Sylvia Fowles (10)	Courtney Vandersloot (4)	Allstate Arena; 6,312	7-4
12	Fri 29	8:30	Phoenix	CN100	81-84	Swin Cash (16)	Sylvia Fowles (10)	Courtney Vandersloot (6)	Allstate Arena; 5,488	7-5

July: 1–4 (Home: 1–3; Road: 0–1)

Game	Date	Time (ET)	Opponent	TV	Score	High points	High rebounds	High assists	Location/Attendance	Record
13	Sun 1	6:00	Atlanta	CN100	71-69	Sylvia Fowles (21)	Sylvia Fowles (12)	Penicheiro; Petrovic; Vandersloot (4)	Allstate Arena; 6,093	8-5
14	Fri 6	8:30	New York	CN100	59-64	Sylvia Fowles (20)	Sylvia Fowles (9)	Courtney Vandersloot (8)	Allstate Arena; 4,211	8-6
15	Sat 7	7:00	@ Indiana	CN100	86-88 (OT)	Sylvia Fowles (24)	Sylvia Fowles (16)	Courtney Vandersloot (6)	Bankers Life Fieldhouse; 6,155	8-7
16	Wed 11	12:30	San Antonio		68-77	Shay Murphy (20)	Sylvia Fowles (7)	Penicheiro; Willingham (3)	Allstate Arena; 13,161	8-8
17	Fri 13	8:30	Connecticut	CN100; CPTV-S	78-80 (OT)	Courtney Vandersloot (22)	Sylvia Fowles (10)	Courtney Vandersloot (8)	Allstate Arena; 5,988	8-9
Summer Olympic break

August: 1–6 (Home: 0–3; Road: 1–3)

Game	Date	Time (ET)	Opponent	TV	Score	High points	High rebounds	High assists	Location/Attendance	Record
Summer Olympic break
18	Fri 17	8:30	Atlanta	CN100	76-82	Epiphanny Prince (16)	Sylvia Fowles (6)	Epiphanny Prince (3)	Allstate Arena; 5,593	8-10
19	Sun 19	4:00	@ Washington	NBATV; CN100; CSN-MA	71-75 (OT)	Epiphanny Prince (18)	Sylvia Fowles (16)	Cash; Vandersloot; Penicheiro; Willingham (2)	Verizon Center; 8,489	8-11
20	Tue 21	8:00	New York	CN100	67-77	Sylvia Fowles (18)	Cash; Fowles (8)	Ticha Penicheiro (7)	Allstate Arena; 3,638	8-12
21	Wed 22	7:00	@ Atlanta	NBATV; CN100; FS-S	71-82	Sylvia Fowles (22)	Sylvia Fowles (6)	Ticha Penicheiro (4)	Philips Arena; 4,010	8-13
22	Fri 24	8:00	@ Tulsa		78-81	Courtney Vandersloot (23)	Shay Murphy (10)	Swin Cash (5)	BOK Center; 5,147	8-14
23	Sun 26	5:00	@ Connecticut	CPTV-S	82-70	Epiphanny Prince (15)	Cash; Swords; Riley; Petrovic (6)	Courtney Vandersloot (11)	Mohegan Sun Arena; 8,390	9-14
24	Tue 28	8:00	Connecticut	CN100; CPTV-S	72-83	Courtney Vandersloot (17)	Sonja Petrovic (8)	Courtney Vandersloot (6)	Allstate Arena; 2,884	9-15

September: 5–5 (Home: 3–1; Road: 2–4)

Game	Date	Time (ET)	Opponent	TV	Score	High points	High rebounds	High assists	Location/Attendance	Record
25	Sat 1	7:00	@ Indiana	NBATV; CN100	64-81	Epiphanny Prince (22)	Carolyn Swords (8)	Courtney Vandersloot (5)	Bankers Life Fieldhouse; 9,307	9-16
26	Sun 2	6:00	Los Angeles	CN100; KDOC	85-74	Epiphanny Prince (17)	Cash; Fowles (9)	Epiphanny Prince (9)	Allstate Arena; 6,197	10-16
27	Fri 7	7:30	@ New York	CN100; MSG	92-83	Epiphanny Prince (30)	Swin Cash (7)	Cash; Prince; Vandersloot (4)	Prudential Center; 6,145	11-16
28	Sun 9	5:00	@ Connecticut	CPTV-S	77-82	Swin Cash (21)	Swin Cash (15)	Prince; Vandersloot (5)	Mohegan Sun Arena; 6,658	11-17
29	Tue 11	8:00	Minnesota	CN100	83-70	Epiphanny Prince (26)	Carolyn Swords (9)	Epiphanny Prince (5)	Allstate Arena; 4,296	12-17
30	Thu 13	10:30	@ Los Angeles	NBATV; CN100; TWC101	77-86	Swin Cash (23)	Swin Cash (6)	Courtney Vandersloot (9)	Staples Center; 8,489	12-18
31	Sun 16	6:00	@ Phoenix	NBATV; CN100	86-55	Shay Murphy (22)	Cash; Willingham (8)	Epiphanny Prince (4)	US Airways Center; 8,044	13-18
32	Tue 18	10:00	@ Seattle		60-75	Epiphanny Prince (21)	Cash; Prince (7)	Epiphanny Prince (4)	KeyArena; 6,459	13-19
33	Thu 20	8:00	Atlanta	CN100	66-75	Carolyn Swords (16)	Carolyn Swords (9)	Courtney Vandersloot (6)	Allstate Arena; 4,188	13-20
34	Sat 22	8:00	Washington	NBATV; CN100	77-58	Courtney Vandersloot (20)	Swin Cash (8)	Vandersloot; Prince (3)	Allstate Arena; 6,721	14-20

All games are viewable on WNBA LiveAccess or ESPN3.com

== Standings ==
Eastern Conference	W	L	PCT	GB	Home	Road	Conf.
Connecticut Sun ^{y}	25	9	.735	–	12–5	13–4	18–4
Indiana Fever ^{x}	22	12	.647	3.0	13–4	9–8	15–7
Atlanta Dream ^{x}	19	15	.559	6.0	11–6	8–9	12–10
New York Liberty ^{x}	15	19	.441	10.0	9–8	6–11	10–12
Chicago Sky ^{o}	14	20	.412	11.0	7–10	7–10	8–14
Washington Mystics ^{o}	5	29	.147	20.0	4–13	1–16	3–19

Legend
GP	Games played	GS	Games started	MPG	Minutes per game	RPG	Rebounds per game
APG	Assists per game	SPG	Steals per game	BPG	Blocks per game	PPG	Points per game
FG%	Field-goal percentage	3P%	3-point field-goal percentage	FT%	Free-throw percentage	TO	Turnovers per game
PF	Fouls per game		Team leader		League leader

=== Regular season ===
Player	GP	GS	MPG	FG%	3P%	FT%	RPG	APG	SPG	BPG	PPG
Epiphanny Prince	26	25	30.0	44.2	40.7	89.9	3.5	3.1	1.8	0.3	18.1
Sylvia Fowles	25	25	31.1	63.8	0.0	69.2	10.4	0.8	1.3	1.2	16.2
Swin Cash	34	34	30.0	36.7	28.1	76.5	5.8	2.3	1.0	0.5	10.6
Courtney Vandersloot	34	27	26.6	40.5	33.3	64.9	2.1	4.6	1.3	0.2	8.9
Shay Murphy	29	3	18.6	42.0	44.1	73.0	2.9	0.9	1.1	0.2	8.5
Tamera Young	33	24	24.4	42.3	0.0	60.6	3.7	1.4	1.0	0.2	8.2
Sonja Petrovic	30	2	15.1	35.8	27.9	76.9	2.3	1.0	0.5	0.5	4.8
Carolyn Swords	30	9	11.1	57.1	0.0	68.2	3.2	0.3	0.4	0.5	4.0
Sydney Carter	1	0	9.0	33.3	0.0	0.0	0.0	0.0	1.0	0.0	4.0
Le'Coe Willingham	33	1	18.5	31.3	27.4	60.9	2.9	0.9	0.5	0.1	3.5
Ruth Riley	33	14	14.4	37.9	27.8	78.6	2.4	1.0	0.7	0.6	2.7
Ticha Penicheiro	19	6	12.7	35.3	20.0	54.5	1.3	2.1	0.4	0.2	1.7

== Awards and honors ==
Recipient	Award	Date awarded	Ref.
Epiphanny Prince	Eastern Conference Player of the Week	June 3	
Epiphanny Prince	Eastern Conference Player of the Week	June 11	
Sylvia Fowles	Eastern Conference Player of the Month - May	June 1	
Sylvia Fowles	All-Defensive First Team	September 28	
Sylvia Fowles	All-WNBA Second Team	October 16	
