= Kentucky Wildcats women's basketball =

Women's college basketball team

Kentucky Wildcats
2026–27 Kentucky Wildcats women's basketball team
- University: University of Kentucky
- Athletic director: J Batt
- Head coach: Kenny Brooks (3rd season)
- Location: Lexington, Kentucky
- Arena: Memorial Coliseum (capacity: 6,250)
- Conference: SEC
- Nickname: Wildcats
- Colors: Blue and white

NCAA Division I tournament Elite Eight
- 1982, 2010, 2012, 2013
Other NCAA Division I tournament results
Sweet Sixteen	1982, 2010, 2012, 2013, 2014, 2016, 2026
Appearances	1982, 1983, 1986, 1991, 1999, 2006, 2010, 2011, 2012, 2013, 2014, 2015, 2016, 2017, 2019, 2021, 2022, 2025, 2026

AIAW tournament second round
- 1981

AIAW tournament appearances
- 1980, 1981

Conference tournament champions
- 1982, 2022

Conference regular-season champions
- 2012

Uniforms
Home	Away

The Kentucky Wildcats women's basketball team represents the University of Kentucky in the Southeastern Conference. The Wildcats have four Elite Eight appearances and seventeen appearances in the NCAA Division I women's basketball tournament. They have won the SEC tournament twice and SEC regular season championship once.

The first University of Kentucky women's basketball team was organized in 1902, and competed for the first time on Feb. 21, 1903. However, in 1924, despite a perfect 10-0 season, the University Senate passed a bill to abolish women's basketball in part because, according to state politicians, "basketball had proven to be a strenuous sport for boys and therefore was too strenuous for girls."

After 50 years, women's basketball was granted varsity status in 1974, and most of the official records maintained by the university only reflect games since that time. The team, coached by Sue Feamster, was given the nickname "Lady Kats", which continued to be used until May 1995.

The team's current head coach is Kenny Brooks, who was hired from Virginia Tech after Kyra Elzy was fired in March 2024.

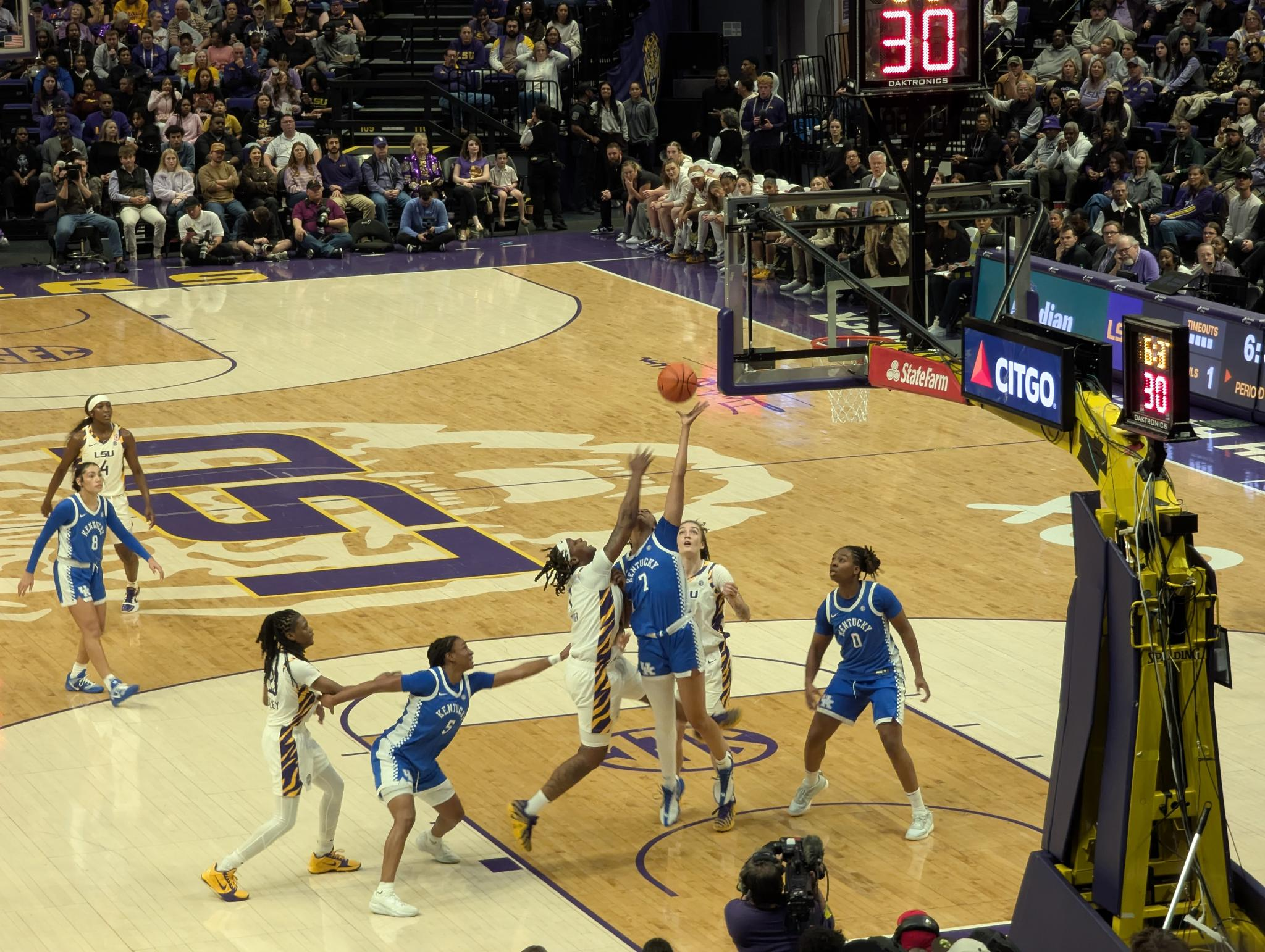
Kentucky Wildcats at LSU on January 1, 2026.

== Facilities ==
Since the restoration of the program in 1974, the Kentucky Wildcats have played their home games in the 6,250-seat Memorial Coliseum, and their record attendance in that building is 10,622, set on February 5, 1983 against Old Dominion; they also led the nation with an average attendance of 3,645 that season. In recent years, the team has also played occasional games in Rupp Arena, which had a capacity of 23,500 before a renovation completed in 2019 reduced the capacity to 20,545.

In January 2007, the university opened the Joe Craft Center, a $30 million state-of-the-art basketball practice facility for both the men's and women's teams, named after businessman and philanthropist Joe Craft.

In July 2022, athletic director Mitch Barnhart announced that Memorial Coliseum would be receiving extensive upgrades during the 2023-2024 athletics season. Most notably, air conditioning would be added to the building for the first time, as well as seating upgrades, and the addition of new event space. The renovations are expected to last for one year, displacing all four teams who call the arena home, including women's basketball. On April 18, 2023, Barnhart announced that the majority of the 2023-2024 women's basketball season would be played at Rupp Arena, with a select number of games being played at Transylvania University's Clive M. Beck Center when Rupp Arena was unavailable. The Wildcats returned to Memorial Coliseum, now with a reduced capacity of 6,250, for 2024–25.

== History ==
Led by UK all-time leading scorer Valerie Still, Patty Jo Hedges, and Lea Wise, the Lady Kats won the SEC Tournament in 1982. The following year, the same trio led the team to a #4 ranking in the country, the highest in the team's history.

== Head coaches ==
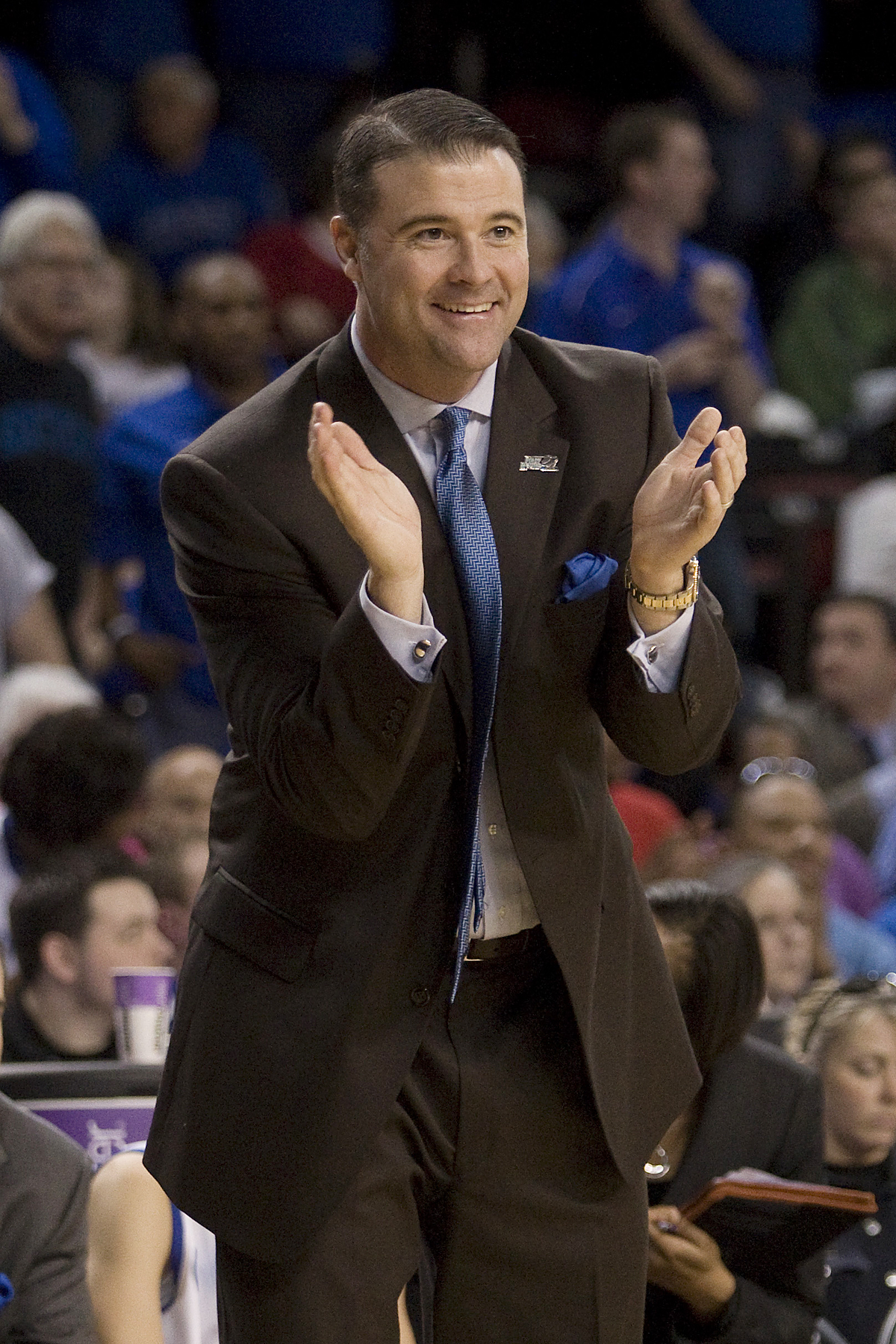
Former Head Coach Matthew Mitchell

- Jane Todd Watson (1903)
- C.P. St. John (1904 - ?)
- Thomson Bryant (? - 1907)
- C.W. Leaphart (1907–1908)
- Walter C. Fox (1908 - ?)
- John J. Tigert (? - 1915, 1916–1917)
- William Tuttle (1915–1916)
- Jim Park (1917–1918)
- Andy Gill (1918–1919)
- Sarah Blanding (1919–1922)
- Happy Chandler (1922–1923)
- Bart Peak (1923–1924)
- Sue Feamster (1974–76)
- Debbie Yow (1976–80)
- Terry Hall (1980–87)
- Sharon Fanning (1987–95)
- Bernadette Locke-Mattox (1995–2003)
- Mickie DeMoss (2003–2007)
- Matthew Mitchell (2007–2020)
- Kyra Elzy (2020–2024)
- Kenny Brooks (2024–present)

== Roster ==
2026–27 Kentucky Wildcats women's basketball team
Players
Coaches

Pos.	#	Name	Height	Year	Previous school	Hometown
G	8	Asia Boone	5 ft 8 in (1.73 m)	Sr	Liberty	San Diego, CA
G	11	Gabby Brooks	5 ft 10 in (1.78 m)	Sr	Virginia Tech	Harrisonburg, VA
G	12	Dominika Paurová	6 ft 1 in (1.85 m)	RS Jr	Oregon State	Mladá Boleslav, CZE
C	13	Clara Strack	6 ft 5 in (1.96 m)	Sr	Virginia Tech	Buffalo, NY
C	15	Elsa Vadfors	6 ft 5 in (1.96 m)	So	Uppsala Basket	Hudiksvall, SWE
G	tbd	Ayanna Patterson	6 ft 5 in (1.96 m)	Jr	UConn	Fort Wayne, IN
G	tbd	Diana Collins	5 ft 9 in (1.75 m)	Sr	Alabama	Lilburn, GA
G	tbd	Me'Arah O'Neal	6 ft 4 in (1.93 m)	Jr	Florida	Houston, TX
F	tbd	Ajša Sivka	6 ft 4 in (1.93 m)	Fr	Joventut Badalona	Slovenske Konjice, SVN
G	tbd	Maddyn Greenway	5 ft 8 in (1.73 m)	Fr	Providence Academy	Plymouth, MN
G	tbd	Savvy Swords	6 ft 1 in (1.85 m)	Fr	Long Island Lutheran	Brookville, NY
G	tbd	Emily McDonald	6 ft 0 in (1.83 m)	Fr	Long Island Lutheran	Brookville, NY

Head coach

- Kenny Brooks (James Madison)

Assistant coach(es)

- Lindsey Hicks (Purdue) (AHC)
- Radvile Autukaite (Reinhardt)
- Josh Petersen (Florida State)
- Ciara Gregory (Charlotte)
- Will Sims (Indiana)

Legend

- (C) Team captain
- (S) Suspended
- (I) Ineligible
- (W) Walk-on
- Injured
- Current redshirt

Roster
Last update: May 7, 2026

== Year by year results ==
Year Record Coach

1903 1-0 Jane Todd Walton

1904 2-0 C.P. St. John

1905 Unknown

1906 0-1 Thomson Bryant

1907 No Games Thomson Bryant

1908 3-0-1 C.W. Leaphart

1908–09 4-1 Walter C. Fox

1909–10 7-1 No Coach Listed

1910–11 No Record

1911–12 4-1 J.J. Tigert

1912–13 5-0 J.J. Tigert (State Champions)

1913–14 4-2 J.J. Tigert

1914–15 5-1 J.J. Tigert

1915–16 2-2 William Tuttle

1916–17 5-0 J.J. Tigert

1917–18 1-4 Jim Park

1918–19 2-0 Andy Gill

1919–20 0-3-1 Sarah Blanding

1920–21 1-7 Sarah Blanding

1921–22 2-4 Sarah Blanding

1922–23 7-3 A.B. "Happy" Chandler

1923–24 10-0 Bart Peak (Champions of the South)

Total: 65-30-1

1970-71 11-1

Conference tournament winners noted with W Source

Season	Team	Overall	Conference	Standing	Postseason	Coaches' poll	AP poll
Peggy J. Pruitt (CIAW) (1969–1970)
1968–69	Unknown	1–1	–		CIAW First Round		
:		–	–				
Sue Feamster (Independent) (1971–1976)
1971–72	Sue Feamster	10–3	–		-		
1972–73	Sue Feamster	13–8	–		-		
1973–74	Sue Feamster	13–7	–		-		
1974–75	Sue Feamster	16–9	–		Regional II		
1975–76	Sue Feamster	13–12	–		Kentucky Women's Intercoll. Conf. Tournament		
Sue Feamster:		64–21	–				
Debbie Yow (Independent, SEC) (1976–1980)
1976–77	Debbie Yow	19–7	–		Kentucky Women's Intercoll. Conf. Tournament		
1977–78	Debbie Yow	23–12	–		AIAW Region II, NWIT Third Place		
1978–79	Debbie Yow	13–16	–		Kentucky Women's Intercoll. Conf. Tournament		
1979–80	Debbie Yow	24–5	–		AIAW First Round		14
Debbie Yow:		79–40	–				
Terry Hall (Independent, SEC) (1980–1987)
1980–81	Terry Hall	25–6	–		AIAW Sixteen		11
1981–82	Terry Hall	24–8	–	W	NCAA Quarterfinals		13
1982–83	Terry Hall	23–5	6–2	2nd (SEC East)	NCAA First Round		12
1983–84	Terry Hall	15–13	2–6	T-3rd (SEC East)			
1984–85	Terry Hall	16–12	3–5	4th (SEC East)			
1985–86	Terry Hall	18–11	4–5	T-6th	NCAA First Round		
1986–87	Terry Hall	17–11	3–6	7th			
Terry Hall:		138–66	18–24				
Sharon Fanning (SEC) (1987–1995)
1987–88	Sharon Fanning	14–15	0–9	10th			
1988–89	Sharon Fanning	12–16	3–6	T-7th			
1989–90	Sharon Fanning	23–8	3–6	8th	NWIT Champions		
1990–91	Sharon Fanning	20–9	4–5	T-5th	NCAA First Round		
1991–92	Sharon Fanning	16–14	5–6	6th			
1992–93	Sharon Fanning	18–10	5–6	T-6th			
1993–94	Sharon Fanning	17–11	5–6	T-7th			
1994–95	Sharon Fanning	14–14	4–7	9th			
Sharon Fanning:		134–97	29–51				
Bernadette Maddox (SEC) (1995–2003)
1995–96	Bernadette Maddox	8–19	2–9	T-11th			
1996–97	Bernadette Maddox	8–19	2–10	10th			
1997–98	Bernadette Maddox	13–15	5–9	8th			
1998–99	Bernadette Maddox	21–11	7–7	T-5th	NCAA Second Round		
1999–2000	Bernadette Maddox	15–14	5–9	T-8th			
2000–01	Bernadette Maddox	6–21	2–12	12th			
2001–02	Bernadette Maddox	9–20	1–13	12th			
2002–03	Bernadette Maddox	11–16	4–10	9th			
Bernadette Maddox:		91–135	28–79				
Mickie DeMoss (SEC) (2003–2007)
2003–04	Mickie DeMoss	11–17	3–11	11th			
2004–05	Mickie DeMoss	18–16	4–10	T-9th	WNIT Semifinals		
2005–06	Mickie DeMoss	22–9	9–5	4th	NCAA Second Round		
2006–07	Mickie DeMoss	20–14	6–8	T-7th	WNIT Sixteen		
Mickie DeMoss:		71–56	22–34				
Matthew Mitchell (SEC) (2007–2020)
2007–08	Matthew Mitchell	17–16	8–6	T-4th	WNIT Quarterfinals		
2008–09	Matthew Mitchell	16–16	5–9	T-9th	WNIT First Round (Play-in)		
2009–10	Matthew Mitchell	28–8	11–5	2nd	NCAA Elite Eight	9	19
2010–11	Matthew Mitchell	25–9	11–5	2nd	NCAA Second Round	22	17
2011–12	Matthew Mitchell	28–7	13–3	1st	NCAA Elite Eight	8	12
2012–13	Matthew Mitchell	30–6	13–3	2nd	NCAA Elite Eight	7	7
2013–14	Matthew Mitchell	26–9	10–6	4th	NCAA Sweet 16	10	11
2014–15	Matthew Mitchell	24–10	10–6	T-4th	NCAA Second Round	11	16
2015–16	Matthew Mitchell	25-8	10-6	T-4th	NCAA Sweet Sixteen	12	13
2016–17	Matthew Mitchell	22-11	11-5	T-3rd	NCAA Second Round	18	24
2017–18	Matthew Mitchell	15–17	6–10	9th			
2018–19	Matthew Mitchell	25-8	11-5	4th	NCAA Second Round	18	17
2019-20	Matthew Mitchell	22-8	10-6	T-3rd	Canceled due to covid	16	18
Matthew Mitchell:		281–125 (.692)	119–69 (.633)				
Kyra Elzy (SEC) (2020–2024)
2020-21	Kyra Elzy	18-9	9-6	5th	NCAA Second Round	18	21
2021-22	Kyra Elzy	19-12	8-8	7th	NCAA First Round		
2022-23	Kyra Elzy	12-18	2-14	14th			
2023-24	Kyra Elzy	12–20	4-12	12th			
Kyra Elzy:		61–59 (.508)	23–40 (.365)				
Kenny Brooks (SEC) (2024–present)
2024–25	Kenny Brooks	23–8	11–5	4th	NCAA Second Round		
2025–26	Kenny Brooks	25–11	8-8	9th	NCAA Sweet 16		
Kenny Brooks:		48–19 (.716)	19–13 (.594)				
Total:		954–628					
National champion Postseason invitational champion Conference regular season champion Conference regular season and conference tournament champion Division regular season champion Division regular season and conference tournament champion Conference tournament champion

== NCAA tournament results ==
Kentucky has appeared in the NCAA Division I women's basketball tournament nineteen times. They have a record of 25–19.

Year	Seed	Round	Opponent	Result
1982	#2	First Round; Sweet Sixteen; Elite Eight	#7 Illinois #3 South Carolina #1 Louisiana Tech	W 88-80; W 73-69; L 60-82
1983	#3	First Round	#6 Indiana	L 76-87
1986	#7	First Round	#10 Drake	L 70-73
1991	#9	Second Round	#8 James Madison	L 62-70
1999	#6	First Round; Second Round	#11 Nebraska #3 UCLA	W 98-92; L 63-87
2006	#5	First Round; Second Round	#12 Chattanooga #4 Michigan State	W 69-59; L 63-67
2010	#4	First Round; Second Round; Sweet Sixteen; Elite Eight	#13 Liberty #5 Michigan State #1 Nebraska #3 Oklahoma	W 83-77; W 70-52; W 76-67; L 68-88
2011	#4	First Round; Second Round	#13 Hampton #5 North Carolina	W 66-62 (OT); L 74-86
2012	#2	First Round; Second Round; Sweet Sixteen; Elite Eight	#15 McNeese State #7 Green Bay #11 Gonzaga #1 Connecticut	W 68-62; W 65-62; W 79-62; L 65-80
2013	#2	First Round; Second Round; Sweet Sixteen; Elite Eight	#15 Navy #7 Dayton #6 Delaware #1 Connecticut	W 61-41; W 84-70; W 69-62; L 53-83
2014	#3	First Round; Second Round; Sweet Sixteen	#14 Wright State #6 Syracuse #2 Baylor	W 106-60; W 64-59; L 72-90
2015	#2	First Round; Second Round	#15 Tennessee State #7 Dayton	W 97-52; L 94-99
2016	#3	First Round; Second Round; Sweet Sixteen	#14 UNC Asheville #6 Oklahoma #7 Washington	W 85-31; W 79-58; L 72-85
2017	#4	First Round; Second Round	#13 Belmont #5 Ohio State	W 73-70; L 68-82
2019	#6	First Round; Second Round	#11 Princeton #3 NC State	W 82-77; L 57-72
2021	#4	First Round; Second Round	#13 Idaho State #5 Iowa	W 71-63; L 72-86
2022	#6	First Round	#11 Princeton	L 62–69
2025	#4	First Round; Second Round	#13 Liberty #5 Kansas State	W 79-78; L 79-80 (OT)
2026	#5	First Round; Second Round; Sweet Sixteen	#12 James Madison #4 West Virginia #1 Texas	W 71–56; W 74–73; L 54–76

== Accomplishments ==
=== 2009–10 ===
- SEC Player of the Year (consensus): Victoria Dunlap
- SEC Freshman of the Year: A'dia Mathies
- SEC Coach of the Year: Matthew Mitchell

=== 2010–11 ===
- SEC Player of the Year (AP): Victoria Dunlap
- SEC Defensive Player of the Year: Victoria Dunlap

=== 2011–12 ===
- SEC Player of the Year (consensus): A'dia Mathies
- SEC Freshman of the Year (consensus): Bria Goss
- SEC Sixth Woman of the Year (shared; awarded only by coaches): Keyla Snowden
- SEC Coach of the Year (AP): Matthew Mitchell

=== 2012–13 ===
- A'dia Mathies Drafted in the First Round of the 2013 WNBA draft
- SEC Co-Player of the Year : A'dia Mathies

=== 2018–19 ===
- USBWA National Freshman of the Year: Rhyne Howard

=== 2019–20 ===
- SEC Player of the Year (consensus): Rhyne Howard

== All-American players ==
- Valerie Still, 1983 (Coaches; Street & Smith)
- Victoria Dunlap, 2010 (AP; USBWA; Coaches')
- A'dia Mathies, 2012 (USBWA), 2013 (AP; Full Court)
- Rhyne Howard, 2020 (AP, USBWA)

== Player awards ==
=== SEC Awards ===
- Player of the Year

Victoria Dunlap - 2010, 2011
A'dia Mathies - 2012, 2013
Rhyne Howard – 2020, 2021

== See also ==
- 2018–19 Kentucky Wildcats women’s basketball team
