= Victoria Dunlap =

American basketball player (born 1989)

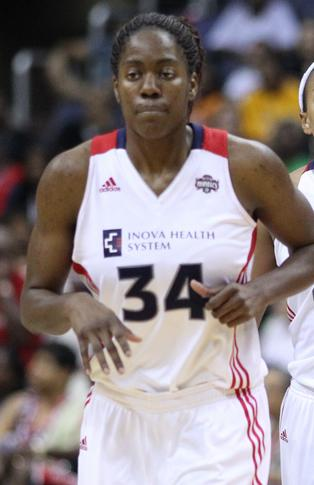

Personal information
- Born: September 19, 1989 (age 37) Nashville, Tennessee, U.S.
- Listed height: 6 ft 1 in (1.85 m)
- Listed weight: 160 lb (73 kg)

Career information
- High school: Brentwood Academy (Nashville, Tennessee)
- College: Kentucky (2007–2011)
- WNBA draft: 2011: 1st round, 11th overall pick
- Drafted by: Washington Mystics
- Playing career: 2011–present
- Position: Forward

Career history
- 2011: Washington Mystics
- 2012: Seattle Storm

Career highlights
- SEC Defensive Player of the Year (2011); 2× SEC Player of the Year (2010, 2011); 2× SEC All-Defensive Team (2010, 2011); State Farm Coaches' All-American (2010); All-American – USBWA (2010); 2× Third-team All-American – AP (2010, 2011); 2× First-team All-SEC (2010, 2011); SEC All-Freshman Team (2008)
- Stats at WNBA.com
- Stats at Basketball Reference

Victoria Dunlap (born September 19, 1989, in Nashville, Tennessee) is an American basketball player who most recently played for the Seattle Storm of the Women's National Basketball Association. She had previously played at the University of Kentucky.

== WNBA ==
Dunlap was selected the first round of the 2011 WNBA draft (11th overall) by the Washington Mystics.

== Career statistics ==
Legend
GP	Games played	GS	Games started	MPG	Minutes per game	RPG	Rebounds per game
APG	Assists per game	SPG	Steals per game	BPG	Blocks per game	PPG	Points per game
TO	Turnovers per game	FG%	Field-goal percentage	3P%	3-point field-goal percentage	FT%	Free-throw percentage
**Bold**	Career best	°	League leader

=== WNBA ===
==== Regular season ====
WNBA regular season statistics
Year	Team	GP	GS	MPG	FG%	3P%	FT%	RPG	APG	SPG	BPG	TO	PPG
2011	Washington	**26**	**3**	**8.4**	**43.9**	**50.0**	47.1	1.7	**0.4**	**0.7**	**0.2**	0.6	2.3
2012	Seattle	5	0	5.6	30.0	0.0	**70.0**	**2.2**	0.2	0.0	0.0	0.6	**2.6**
**Career**	2 years, 2 teams	31	3	8.0	41.8	33.3	55.6	1.7	0.4	0.6	0.2	0.6	2.3

=== College ===
NCAA statistics
Year	Team	GP	Points	FG%	3P%	FT%	RPG	APG	SPG	BPG	PPG
2007–08	Kentucky	33	240	43.9	-	39.6	6.9	0.8	1.3	0.8	7.3
2008–09	Kentucky	32	411	48.2	25.0	55.6	**9.1**	1.0	1.8	1.2	12.8
2009–10	Kentucky	**35**	**633**	**49.7**	28.6	68.9	8.4	1.4	**3.1**	**1.9**	**18.1**
2010–11	Kentucky	33	562	45.8	**41.7**	**70.4**	8.7	**1.5**	3.0	1.5	17.0
**Career**		133	1846	47.3	26.5	62.3	8.3	1.2	2.3	1.3	13.9
