= Trudi Lacey =

American basketball player and coach

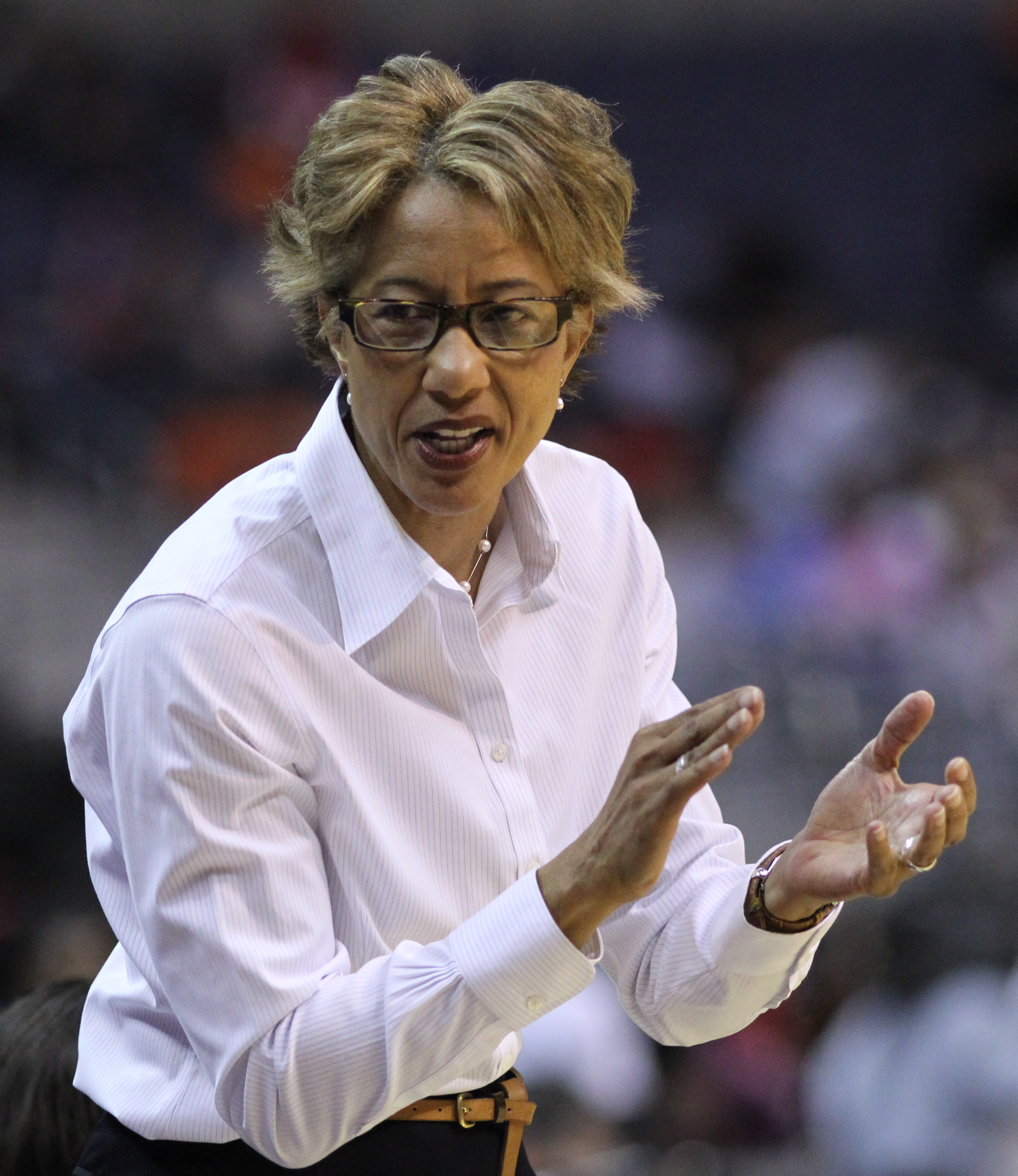

Personal information
- Born: December 12, 1958 (age 67) Clifton Forge, Virginia, U.S.

Career information
- College: NC State (1977–1981)
- Coaching career: 1981–2016

Career history

Coaching
- 1981–1982: Manhattan (assistant)
- 1982–1983: James Madison (assistant)
- 1983–1984: NC State (assistant)
- 1986–1988: Francis Marion
- 1988–1996: South Florida
- 1996–1997: Maryland (assistant)
- 2001–2002: Charlotte Sting (assistant)
- 2003–2005: Charlotte Sting
- 2008–2010: Queens (NC)
- 2009–2010: Washington Mystics (assistant)
- 2011–2012: Washington Mystics
- 2015–2016: JWU–Charlotte

Career highlights
- Sun Belt Coach of the Year (1989)
Medals
Women's basketball
Representing United States
World University Games
Gold medal – first place	1981 Bucharest	Team competition
Gold medal – first place	1983 Edmonton	Team competition
Assistant coach for United States
William Jones Cup
Bronze medal – third place	1995 Taipei	Team competition

Trudi Lacey (born December 12, 1958) is an American basketball head coach, most recently of the Washington Mystics of the Women's National Basketball Association (WNBA).

== NC State statistics ==
Legend
GP	Games played	GS	Games started	MPG	Minutes per game
FG%	Field goal percentage	3P%	3-point field goal percentage	FT%	Free throw percentage
RPG	Rebounds per game	APG	Assists per game	SPG	Steals per game
BPG	Blocks per game	PPG	Points per game	**Bold**	Career high

Year	Team	GP	Points	FG%	3P%	FT%	RPG	APG	PPG
1977–78	NC State	**34**	399	**53.2%**	0.0%	69.1%	4.7	1.7	11.7
1978–79	NC State	**34**	477	47.4%	0.0%	72.5%	9.0	**3.2**	14.0
1979–80	NC State	32	478	47.5%	0.0%	69.2%	7.6	2.5	14.9
1980–81	NC State	30	**603**	45.9%	0.0%	**74.7%**	**11.4**	3.0	**20.1**
Total		130	1957	48.1%	0.0%	71.8%	8.1	2.6	15.1

== USA Basketball ==
Lacey was named to the team representing the US at the inaugural William Jones Cup competition in Taipei, Taiwan. In subsequent years, the teams would be primarily college age players, but in the inaugural event, eight of the twelve players, including Lacey, were in high school. The USA team had a record of 3–4, finishing in fifth place, although one of the wins was over South Korea, who would go on to win the gold medal.

Lacey was chosen to represent the USA on the USA Basketball team at the 1981 World University games, held in Bucharest, Romania. After winning the opening game, the USA was challenged by China, who held a halftime lead. The USA came back to win by two points, helped by 26 points from Denise Curry and 12 from Lacey. The USA was also challenged by Canada, who led at halftime, but the USA won by three points 79–76. The USA beat host team Romania to set up a match with undefeated Russia for the gold medal. The Russian team was too strong, and won the gold, leaving the US with the silver medal. Lacey averaged 6.4 points per game.

Lacey played on the 1983 World University games team, coached by Jill Hutchison. She helped the team win the gold medal.

In 1995, Lacey served as an assistant coach to the R. William Jones Cup Team. The competition was held in Taipei, Taiwan. The USA team won its first six games, but four of the six were won by single-digit margins. Their seventh game was against Russia, and they fell 100–84. The final game was against South Korea, and a victory would assure the gold medal, but the South Korean team won 80–76 to win the gold medal. The USA team won the bronze.

== Head coaching record ==
Team	Year	G	W	L	W–L%	Finish	PG	PW	PL	PW–L%	Result
Charlotte	2003	34	18	16	.529	2nd in Eastern	2	0	2	.000	Lost 2003 WNBA playoffs
Charlotte	2004	34	16	18	.471	5th in Eastern	–	–	–	–	Missed playoffs
Charlotte	2005	24	3	21	.125	(Left mid-season)	–	–	–	–	—
Washington	2011	34	6	28	.176	6th in Eastern	–	–	–	–	Missed playoffs
Washington	2012	34	5	29	.147	6th in Eastern	–	–	–	–	Missed playoffs
**Career**		160	48	112	.300		2	0	2	.000	
