= Crystal Langhorne =

American basketball player (born 1986)

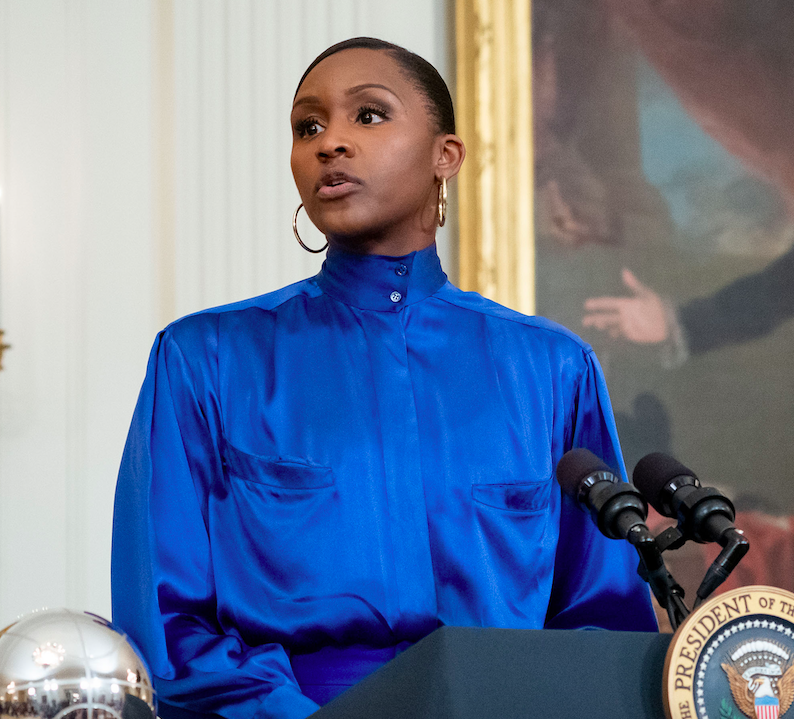
- Langhorne speaks at the White House in 2021

Personal information
- Born: October 27, 1986 (age 40) Queens, New York, U.S.
- Listed height: 6 ft 2 in (1.88 m)
- Listed weight: 185 lb (84 kg)

Career information
- High school: Willingboro (Willingboro, New Jersey)
- College: Maryland (2004–2008)
- WNBA draft: 2008: 1st round, 6th overall pick
- Drafted by: Washington Mystics
- Playing career: 2008–2020
- Position: Power forward / center

Career history
- 2008–2013: Washington Mystics
- 2014–2020: Seattle Storm
- 2014–2016: Good Angels Košice
- 2016–2017: Daqing Rural Commercial Bank
- 2017–2018: Uniqua Sopron

Career highlights
- 2× WNBA champion (2018, 2020); 2× WNBA All-Star (2011, 2013); WNBA Most Improved Player Award (2009); All-WNBA Second Team (2010); NCAA champion (2006); 2× Kodak/State Farm Coaches' All-American (2007, 2008); 3× All-American USBWA (2006–2008); 3× Second-team All-American – AP (2006–2008); ACC Player of the Year (2008); 3× First-team All-ACC (2006–2008); ACC Rookie of the Year (2005); ACC All-Freshman Team (2005); USA Basketball Female Athlete of the Year (2005); FIBA Under-19 World Cup MVP (2005); McDonald's All-American (2004)
- Stats at WNBA.com
- Stats at Basketball Reference
Medals
Women's basketball
Representing the United States
FIBA Under-19 World Cup
Gold medal – first place	2005 Tunisia	Team

Crystal Allison Langhorne (born October 27, 1986) is an American former basketball player of the Women's National Basketball Association (WNBA). She played for the University of Maryland Terrapins. In 2008 she was drafted by the Washington Mystics.

== High school ==
Langhorne is a graduate of Willingboro High School in Willingboro, New Jersey. Langhorne was named a WBCA All-American. She participated in the 2004 WBCA High School All-America Game, where she scored five points, and earned MVP honors.

== College ==
In 2006, she helped the Terrapins win the NCAA Championship, and in 2007 she starred in helping the USA win the FIBA World Championship under 21 for women. She is the first player in the University of Maryland's history to score 2,000 points and grab 1,000 rebounds for either the men's or women's teams, and only the 106th women's college basketball player to do so.

Her jersey was retired and raised to the rafters at the Comcast Center during her last regular season home game. She was the first Maryland player to have her jersey raised to the rafters while still active.

At Maryland, she majored in communications.

== College statistics ==
Legend
GP	Games played	GS	Games started	MPG	Minutes per game	FG%	Field goal percentage
3P%	3-point field goal percentage	FT%	Free throw percentage	RPG	Rebounds per game	APG	Assists per game
SPG	Steals per game	BPG	Blocks per game	TO	Turnovers per game	PPG	Points per game
**Bold**	Career high	*	Led Division I

Year	Team	GP	GS	MPG	FG%	3P%	FT%	RPG	APG	SPG	BPG	TO	PPG
2004–05	Maryland	32	-	31.7	59.2	0.0	56.7	**10.6**	1.2	1.0	0.4	2.8	17.2
2005–06	Maryland	**38**	-	28.7	67.0*	0.0	**69.3**	8.6	**2.0**	0.7	0.4	**2.6**	17.2
2006–07	Maryland	34	-	27.4	**70.7***	0.0	56.5	8.1	1.6	**1.1**	0.4	2.7	14.9
2007–08	Maryland	31	-	**33.1**	64.7*	0.0	66.7	9.4	1.3	0.8	**0.5**	2.9	**17.3**
**Career**		135	-	30.1	65.2	0.0	62.8	9.1	1.5	0.9	0.4	2.7	16.6

== Professional career ==
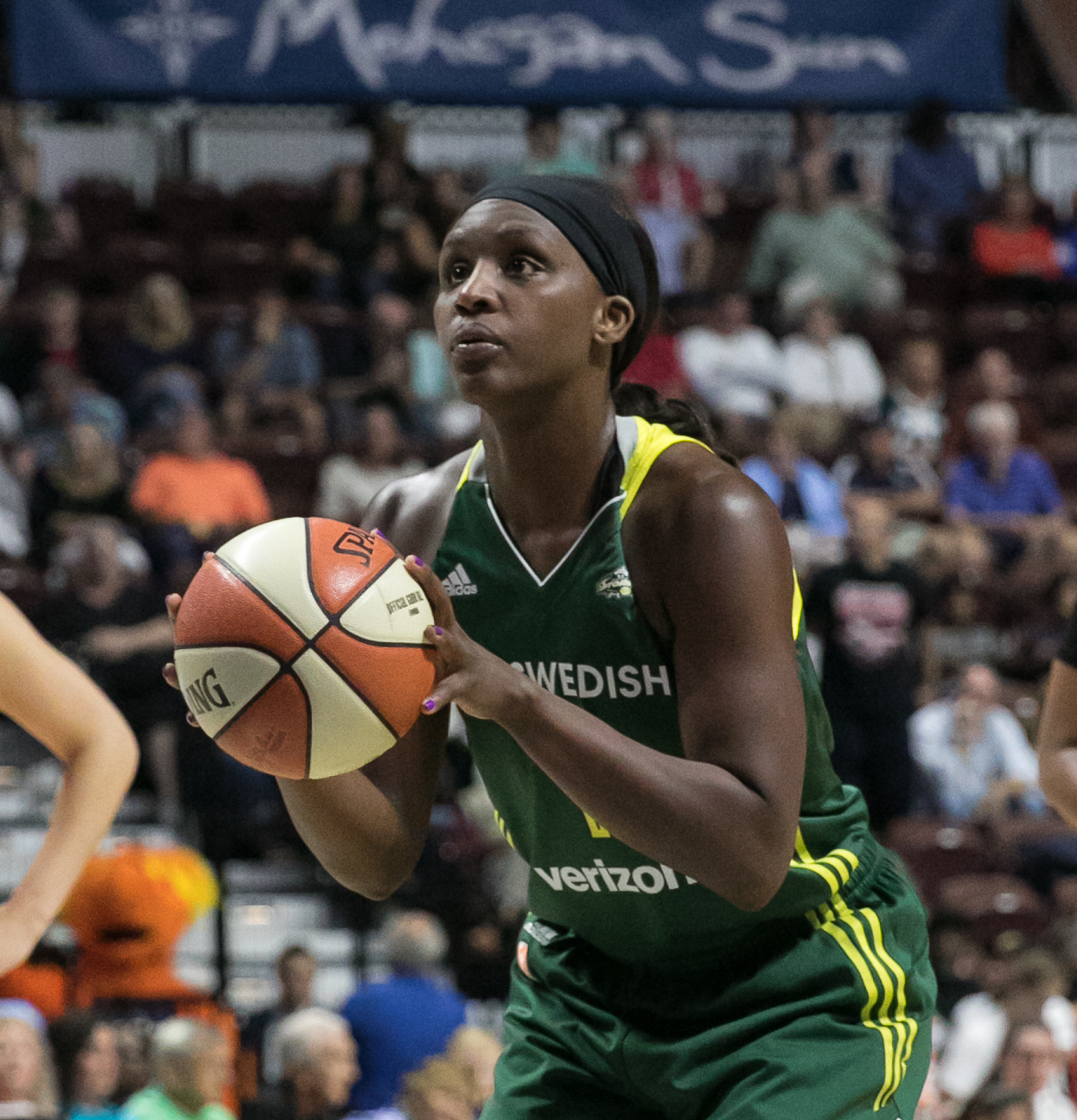
Seattle Storm forward Crystal Langhorne takes a free throw.

=== WNBA ===
In 2008, Langhorne was drafted 6th overall by the Washington Mystics in the 2008 WNBA draft. In her rookie season, Langhorne was a reserve for the Mystics, playing 34 games with 6 starts, averaging 4.8 ppg.

In her second season, Langhorne started in 22 of 34 games played and averaged 12 ppg, she would win Most Improved Player award for that season.

In 2010, Langhorne officially became the Mystics' starting power forward. During the season, she scored a career-high 31 points in a win against the Phoenix Mercury. By the end of the season, she averaged 16.3 ppg and also averaged a career-high in rebounds, she would also be named to the All-WNBA Second Team.

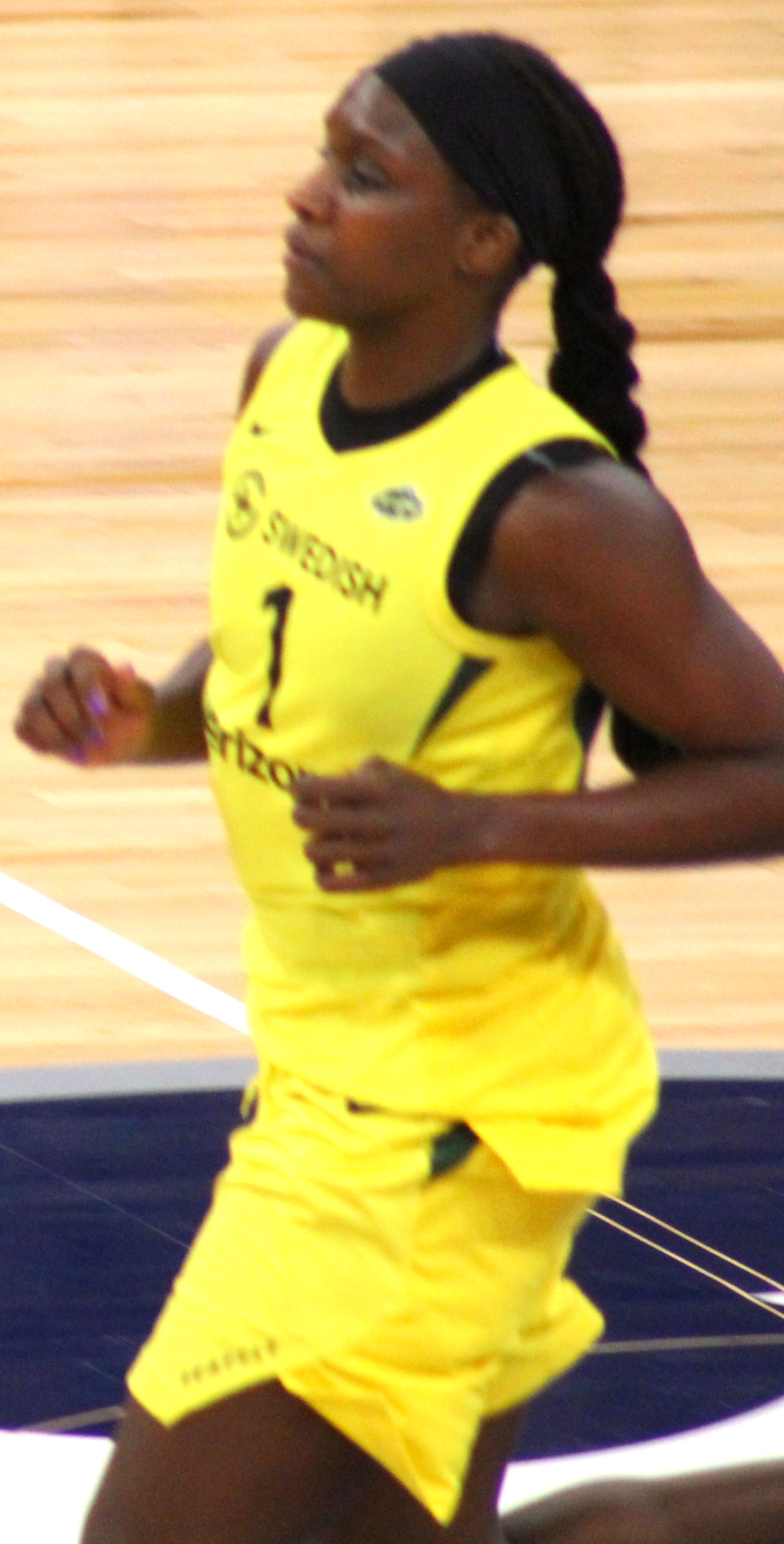
Langhorne in 2018

In 2011, Langhorne averaged a career-high in scoring with 18.2 ppg and was voted into the 2011 WNBA All-Star Game, making it her first career all-star game appearance.

In 2012, Langhorne re-signed with the Mystics once her rookie contract expired. Langhorne would play two more seasons with the Mystics before being traded to the Seattle Storm in 2014, in exchange for Bria Hartley and Tianna Hawkins.

Langhorne would continue to be a starter with the Storm, as she averaged 12.9 in her first season with the team.

In 2016, Langhorne re-signed with the Storm in free agency. During the season, Langhorne set the franchise record for field goals in a game without a miss, when she scored 18 points on 8-for-8 field goal shooting in a win against the Connecticut Sun.

In the 2017 season, Langhorne achieved a new career-high in field shooting percentage and averaged 12.4 ppg. During the season, Langhorne would set a new franchise record for field goals in a game without a miss, by scoring 20 points on 9-of-9 field goal shooting in a win against the Atlanta Dream.

In 2018, Langhorne re-signed again with the Storm. Langhorne would come off the bench for the Storm, playing behind Natasha Howard. The Storm finished with a league best 26–8 record, receiving a double-bye to the semi-finals. They defeated the Phoenix Mercury in a five-game series advancing to the Finals. In the Finals, the Storm would win the championship after sweeping the Washington Mystics.

=== USA Basketball ===
Langhorne was a member of the USA Women's U19 team which competed in the 2005 U19 World Championships in Tunis, Tunisia. The USA team won all eight games, winning the gold medal. Langhorne led the team in scoring with 16.6 points per game and hit nine out of nine field goals attempts in the opening round game against South Korea.

=== Overseas ===
Langhorne played in Slovakia for Good Angels during the off-season from 2014 to 2016. In 2016, Langhorne signed Daqing Rural Commercial Bank of the Women's Chinese Basketball Association for the 2016-17 off-season. In 2017, Langhorne signed with Uniqua Sopron, a Hungarian club for the 2017-18 off-season.

== Post-basketball career ==
After 13 years in the WNBA, Langhorne retired in 2021 and began a community engagement role with the Seattle Storm. She is currently the director of community engagement for Force4Change, the Storm's social justice platform that focuses on voter registration, the amplification of Black women; BIPOC and LGBTQ+ leaders; and organizations serving Black communities.

== WNBA career statistics ==
Legend
GP	Games played	GS	Games started	MPG	Minutes per game	RPG	Rebounds per game
APG	Assists per game	SPG	Steals per game	BPG	Blocks per game	PPG	Points per game
TO	Turnovers per game	FG%	Field-goal percentage	3P%	3-point field-goal percentage	FT%	Free-throw percentage
**Bold**	Career best	°	League leader

†	Denotes seasons in which Langhorne won a WNBA championship

=== Regular season ===
Year	Team	GP	GS	MPG	FG%	3P%	FT%	RPG	APG	SPG	BPG	TO	PPG
2008	Washington	**34**	6	15.6	.624	.000	.549	4.0	0.4	0.4	0.1	**1.0**	4.8
2009	Washington	**34**	22	29.8	.574	.000	.689	7.9	0.9	1.0	0.3	2.2	12.0
2010	Washington	**34**	**34**	34.1	.589	.167	.772	**9.7**	1.1	0.8	0.2	2.6	16.3
2011	Washington	31	31	**34.3**	.534	.125	.711	7.6	**1.6**	1.2	**0.4**	3.2	**18.2**
2012	Washington	31	31	32.2	.562	.125	.641	6.3	1.4	**1.4**	0.1	2.4	14.7
2013	Washington	**34**	**34**	28.6	.515	.125	.651	7.2	1.3	0.9	0.2	2.3	12.0
2014	Seattle	**34**	**34**	28.9	.571	.667	.658	7.4	1.0	0.6	0.3	2.0	12.9
2015	Seattle	**34**	**34**	25.7	.545	.000	.750	5.7	0.8	0.9	0.4	2.0	11.1
2016	Seattle	33	33	25.6	.630	**1.000**	.759	5.5	1.4	0.7	0.3	1.5	9.5
2017	Seattle	**34**	**34**	28.4	**.647**	.500	.735	6.1	1.5	0.6	0.4	1.6	12.4
2018^{†}	Seattle	26	1	13.9	.500	.000	**.889**	3.0	0.3	0.3	0.1	0.9	4.6
Career	11 years, 2 teams	359	294	27.2	.569	.182	.701	6.5	1.1	0.8	0.3	2.0	11.8

=== Postseason ===
Year	Team	GP	GS	MPG	FG%	3P%	FT%	RPG	APG	SPG	BPG	TO	PPG
2009	Washington	2	2	**39.6**	**.700**	.000	.625	**10.0**	0.5	**0.5**	0.5	3.0	**16.5**
2010	Washington	2	2	34.8	.458	.000	**1.000**	8.0	1.5	0.0	**2.0**	2.5	13.5
2013	Washington	**3**	**3**	27.9	.400	.000	.333	8.0	**2.0**	0.0	0.0	1.3	5.7
2016	Seattle	1	1	20.8	.333	.000	**1.000**	7.0	**2.0**	0.0	1.0	2.0	7.0
2017	Seattle	1	1	21.7	.500	.000	.000	3.0	0.0	0.0	0.0	**0.0**	2.0
2018^{†}	Seattle	**8**	0	10.3	.520	.000	.500	2.9	0.5	0.1	0.1	0.2	3.8
Career	6 years, 2 teams	17	9	21.0	.505	.000	.667	5.5	0.9	0.1	0.4	1.1	6.8

== See also ==
- List of WNBA career rebounding leaders
