= Matee Ajavon =

Liberian American basketball player (born 1986)

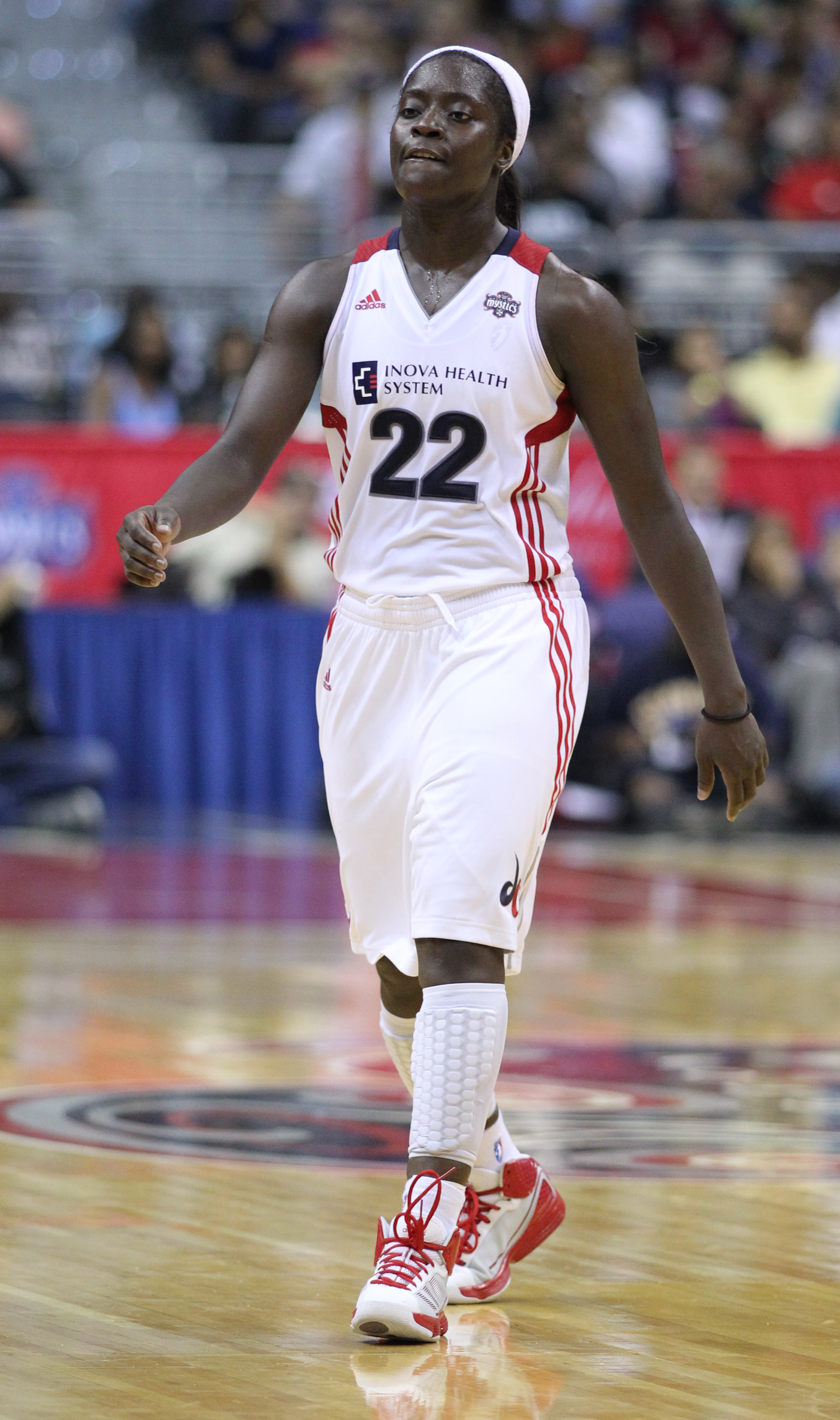

Personal information
- Born: May 7, 1986 (age 40)
- Listed height: 5 ft 8 in (1.73 m)
- Listed weight: 160 lb (73 kg)

Career information
- High school: Malcolm X Shabazz (Newark, New Jersey)
- College: Rutgers (2004–2008)
- WNBA draft: 2008: 1st round, 5th overall pick
- Drafted by: Houston Comets
- Playing career: 2008–present
- Position: Point guard

Career history
- 2008: Houston Comets
- 2008–2010: Fenerbahçe Istanbul
- 2009–2014: Washington Mystics
- 2010–2011: Istanbul University
- 2011–2012: Optimum Ted Kolejliler
- 2013: CSM Târgovişte
- 2013–present: Mersin Büyükşehir Belediyesi
- 2014–2017: Atlanta Dream

Career highlights
- WNBA All-Rookie Team (2008); 2× First-team All-Big East (2006, 2008); Big East Tournament MOP (2007); All-Big East Freshman Team (2005); Big East Freshman of the Year (2005); McDonald's All-American (2004)
- Stats at WNBA.com
- Stats at Basketball Reference
Medals
Women's basketball
Representing the United States
Pan American Games
| Gold medal – first place | 2007 Brazil | Team |

Matee Ajavon (born May 7, 1986) is a Liberian-American basketball player. A 5'8" guard, Ajavon was chosen by the Houston Comets as the fifth overall draft pick in the 2008 WNBA draft.

== Early life ==
As a child, Ajavon immigrated to the United States with her family from Monrovia, Liberia.

== High school ==
Ajavon graduated from Malcolm X Shabazz High School in Newark, New Jersey. She led the Shabazz girls' basketball team to victory in the State of New Jersey's "Tournament of Champions" in both 2003 and 2004, the first time a school had repeated as champion. Ajavon was named a WBCA All-American. She participated in the 2004 WBCA High School All-America Game, where she scored nine points.

== College ==
Ajavon graduated from Rutgers University in 2008, having majored in Africana Studies. She was a key member of the 2006–2007 Scarlet Knights women's basketball team that reached the NCAA Championship game.

== College statistics ==
Legend
| GP | Games played | GS | Games started | MPG | Minutes per game |
| FG% | Field goal percentage | 3P% | 3-point field goal percentage | FT% | Free throw percentage |
| RPG | Rebounds per game | APG | Assists per game | SPG | Steals per game |
| BPG | Blocks per game | PPG | Points per game | **Bold** | Career high |

| Year | Team | GP | Points | FG% | 3P% | FT% | RPG | APG | SPG | BPG | PPG |
|---|---|---|---|---|---|---|---|---|---|---|---|
| 2004–05 | Rutgers | **35** | **434** | 41.6 | 26.2 | 72.2 | 2.9 | 3.5 | 2.2 | 0.2 | 12.4 |
| 2005–06 | Rutgers | 32 | 402 | **43.3** | 34.1 | 75.0 | 2.8 | 4.5 | **2.6** | 0.4 | **12.6** |
| 2006–07 | Rutgers | 32 | 383 | 41.5 | **39.5** | 70.6 | 3.1 | 3.8 | 1.7 | 0.4 | 12.0 |
| 2007–08 | Rutgers | 33 | 403 | 39.8 | 25.2 | **78.8** | **3.6** | **5.2** | 1.8 | 0.3 | 12.2 |
| Career | Rutgers | 132 | 1622 | 41.5 | 30.9 | 74.1 | 3.1 | 4.2 | 2.1 | 0.3 | 12.3 |

== USA Basketball ==
Ajavon played for the USA team in the 2007 Pan American Games in Rio de Janeiro, Brazil. The team won all five games, earning the gold medal for the event.

== Professional ==
Ajavon played primarily off the bench during her rookie WNBA season, but averaged 8.0 points per game. When the Houston Comets folded in 2008, Ajavon was selected second in the dispersal draft by the Washington Mystics.

During the 2008–2010 WNBA offseason, Ajavon played in the EuroLeague Women for Fenerbahçe Istanbul.

In her first season with Washington, Ajavon put up remarkably similar numbers to her first WNBA campaign. Again mainly playing as a reserve, she scored 8.0 points per game. Ajavon helped the Mystics reach the playoffs, where she played well, scoring 19 points in just 34 total minutes, but Washington suffered a two-game sweep at the hands of the Indiana Fever.

== WNBA career statistics ==
Legend
| GP | Games played | GS | Games started | MPG | Minutes per game | RPG | Rebounds per game |
| APG | Assists per game | SPG | Steals per game | BPG | Blocks per game | PPG | Points per game |
| TO | Turnovers per game | FG% | Field-goal percentage | 3P% | 3-point field-goal percentage | FT% | Free-throw percentage |
| **Bold** | Career best | ° | League leader |

=== Regular season ===
| Year | Team | GP | GS | MPG | FG% | 3P% | FT% | RPG | APG | SPG | BPG | TO | PPG |
|---|---|---|---|---|---|---|---|---|---|---|---|---|---|
| 2008 | Houston | **34** | 2 | 17.8 | .332 | .194 | .791 | 1.8 | 1.7 | 0.9 | 0.2 | 1.5 | 8.0 |
| 2009 | Washington | **34** | 4 | 17.3 | .336 | **.341** | .673 | 1.9 | 1.1 | 1.1 | 0.1 | 1.4 | 8.0 |
| 2010 | Washington | **34** | 0 | 14.6 | .346 | .184 | .773 | 1.6 | 1.4 | 1.1 | 0.1 | 1.5 | 5.9 |
| 2011 | Washington | **34** | **33** | **31.3** | .391 | .276 | **.829** | **2.4** | **3.1** | **1.7** | **0.3** | 3.0 | **14.7** |
| 2012 | Washington | **33** | 22 | 21.6 | .299 | .301 | .827 | 1.8 | 2.0 | 1.6 | 0.2 | 1.9 | 7.9 |
| 2013 | Washington | 34 | 27 | 21.6 | .299 | .301 | .827 | 1.7 | 2.9 | 0.9 | 0.0 | 2.2 | 8.9 |
| 2014 | Atlanta | 24 | 1 | 9.2 | .278 | .111 | .724 | 1.7 | 2.9 | 0.9 | 0.0 | **0.9** | 2.2 |
| 2015 | Atlanta | 33 | 11 | 17.6 | **.405** | .167 | .822 | 1.8 | 2.5 | 1.4 | 0.1 | 1.8 | 5.9 |
| 2016 | Atlanta | 33 | 2 | 10.6 | .305 | .231 | .750 | 1.6 | 1.2 | 0.3 | 0.2 | 1.0 | 3.3 |
| 2017 | Atlanta | 31 | 2 | 8.1 | .289 | .000 | .795 | 1.2 | 1.0 | 0.3 | 0.0 | **0.9** | 2.4 |
| Career | 10 years, 3 teams | 323 | 104 | 17.4 | .347 | .266 | .782 | 1.8 | 1.8 | 1.0 | 0.1 | 1.7 | 6.9 |

=== Postseason ===
| Year | Team | GP | GS | MPG | FG% | 3P% | FT% | RPG | APG | SPG | BPG | TO | PPG |
|---|---|---|---|---|---|---|---|---|---|---|---|---|---|
| 2009 | Washington | 2 | 0 | 17.0 | .375 | .250 | .833 | 2.5 | 1.5 | **2.0** | 0.0 | 1.0 | 9.5 |
| 2010 | Washington | 2 | 0 | 17.5 | .440 | **.400** | .750 | 0.0 | 1.5 | 1.5 | 0.0 | 1.0 | **18.0** |
| 2013 | Washington | **3** | **3** | **21.9** | .235 | .000 | .750 | **3.3** | **2.3** | **2.0** | 0.0 | 2.6 | 4.7 |
| 2014 | Atlanta | 2 | 0 | 17.5 | .000 | .000 | .000 | 1.0 | 0.5 | 0.0 | 0.0 | **0.5** | 0.0 |
| 2016 | Atlanta | 2 | 1 | 15.6 | **.500** | .000 | **1.000** | 2.5 | 0.5 | 0.0 | 0.0 | 1.5 | 7.0 |
| Career | 5 years, 2 team | 11 | 4 | 15.7 | .368 | .190 | .806 | 2.0 | 1.4 | 1.2 | 0.0 | 1.5 | 7.5 |
