= Jasmine Thomas (basketball) =

American basketball player (born 1989)

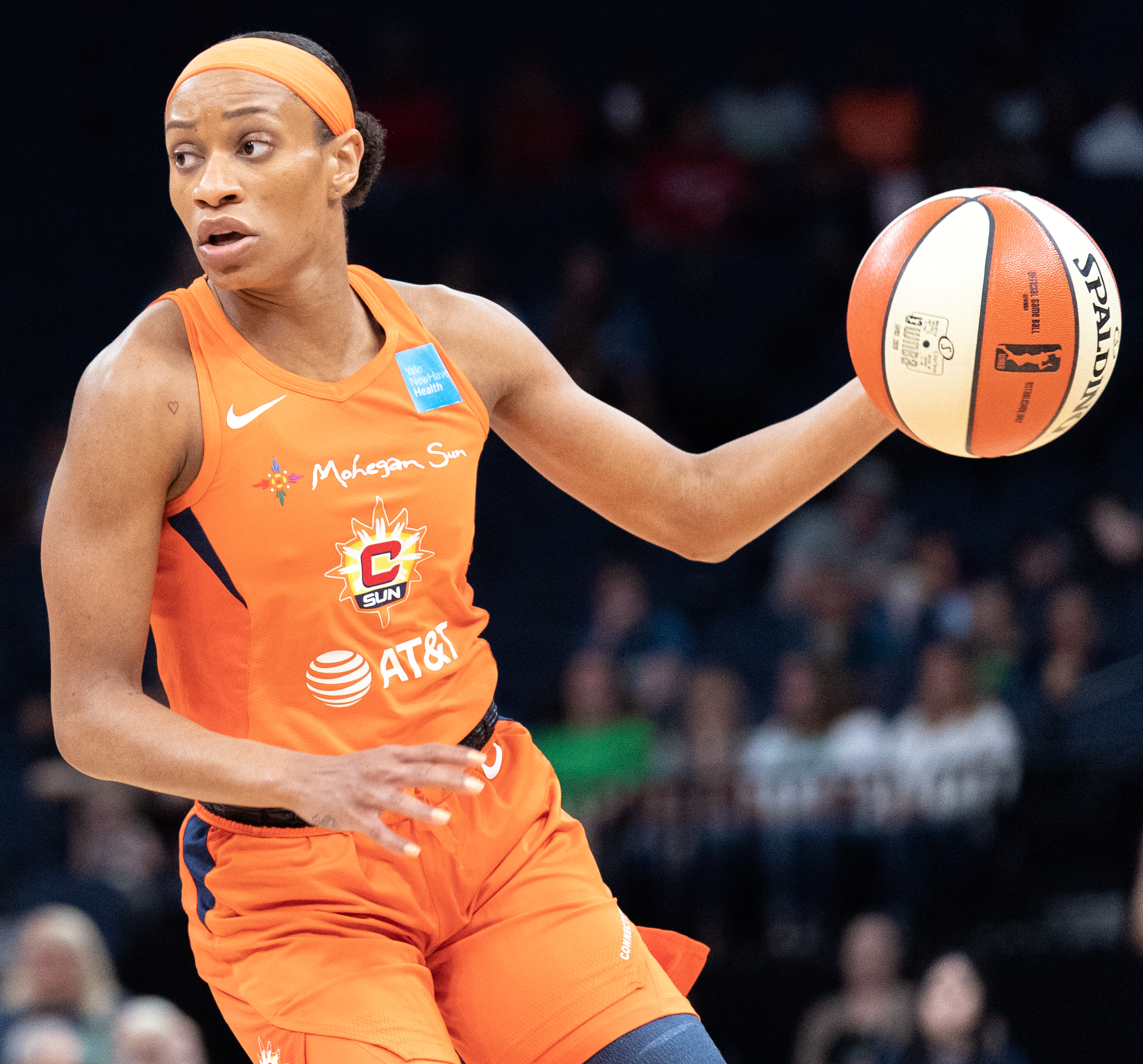
- Thomas in 2019

Personal information
- Born: September 30, 1989 (age 37) Fairfax, Virginia, U.S.
- Listed height: 5 ft 9 in (1.75 m)
- Listed weight: 143 lb (65 kg)

Career information
- High school: Oakton (Vienna, Virginia)
- College: Duke (2007–2011)
- WNBA draft: 2011: 1st round, 12th overall pick
- Drafted by: Seattle Storm
- Playing career: 2011–2023
- Position: Point guard
- Number: 15, 5

Career history
- 2011–2012: Washington Mystics
- 2011–2012: Sika Brno
- 2012–2013: Vologda Chevakata
- 2013–2014: Atlanta Dream
- 2014–2015: OGM Ormanspor
- 2015–2022: Connecticut Sun
- 2015–2016: Bnot Herzliya
- 2016–2017: Ramat Hasharon
- 2017–2018: OGM Ormanspor
- 2018–2019: CCC Polkowice
- 2019–2020: AZS AJP Gorzów Wielkopolski
- 2020–2021: Fenerbahçe
- 2021–2023: Çukurova Basketbol
- 2023: Los Angeles Sparks

Career highlights
- Turkish Super League champion (2021); WNBA All-Star (2017); 3× WNBA All-Defensive First Team (2017–2019); 2× WNBA All-Defensive Second Team (2016, 2021); No. 5 Retired by retired by Connecticut Sun; 2× ACC Tournament MVP (2010, 2011); Second-team All-American – AP (2011); ACC All-Defense team (2011); Third-team All-American – AP (2010); WBCA Coaches' All-American (2010); 2× First-team All-ACC (2010, 2011); McDonald's All-American Game MVP (2007)
- Stats at WNBA.com
- Stats at Basketball Reference
Medals
Women's basketball
Representing the United States
FIBA Under-19 World Cup
Gold medal – first place	2007 Slovakia	Team

Jasmine Thomas (born September 30, 1989) is an American former professional basketball player. She last played for the Los Angeles Sparks of the Women's National Basketball Association (WNBA).

== USA Basketball ==
Thomas was selected as a member of the USA Women's U19 team which won the gold medal at the FIBA U19 World Championship in Bratislava, Slovakia. The event was held in July and August 2007, when the USA team defeated Sweden to win the championship. She averaged 7.4 points per game.

== Professional career ==
=== WNBA ===
Thomas was selected in the first round of the 2011 WNBA draft (12th overall) by the Seattle Storm. Prior to her rookie season she was traded to the Washington Mystics on April 29, 2011 in a three-team trade deal; with the Indiana Fever receiving Erin Phillips and the Storm's third round draft pick, and the Storm receiving Katie Smith, Jacinta Monroe and the Fever's second round pick. Thomas played for the Mystics for two seasons before being traded to the Atlanta Dream in 2013 in exchange for the Dream's two first round draft picks and a second round draft pick. During her two-year stint with the Dream, Thomas made her first WNBA Finals appearance as the Dream advanced all the way to the 2013 WNBA Finals, where they got swept by the Minnesota Lynx.

In 2015, Thomas re-signed with the Dream in free agency. Months later, Thomas was traded to the Connecticut Sun in exchange for draft rights to Brittany Hrynko. In 2015, Thomas became the Sun's starting point guard and started in all 34 games for the first time in her career. In the 2016 season, she continued her role as the Sun's starting point guard; she achieved new career-highs in scoring, assists and field goal shooting. She averaged 11.7 ppg, 5.1 apg while shooting 40% from the field.

In 2017, Thomas re-signed with the Sun in free agency. During the 2017 season, Thomas would continue to flourish in her role at starting point guard for the Sun. On June 29, 2017, Thomas scored a career-high of 29 points in a 96–89 victory over the Seattle Storm. On July 8, 2017, the Sun made history as they completed the biggest comeback in franchise history after defeating the Washington Mystics 96-92 after overcoming a 22-point deficit as they improved to 10–7, Thomas scored 15 points along with 6 assists and 5 steals in the win. She was then voted into the 2017 WNBA All-Star Game, making it her first all-star game appearance. Thomas would finish the season setting new career-highs in both field goal shooting and three-point shooting percentage as well as in scoring and steals as the Sun finished fourth place in the league with a 21–13 record, receiving a bye to the second round, making it their first playoff appearance since 2012. In the second round elimination game, the Sun were defeated 88-83 by the number 5-seeded Phoenix Mercury. Thomas scored 15 points in the loss.

In 2018, the Sun continued to remain a competitive playoff team. On August 5, 2018, Thomas scored a new career-high 30 points in a 109–88 win over the Las Vegas Aces. The Sun finished 21–13 with the number 4 seed, receiving a bye to the second round. They would lose yet again in the second elimination game to the Phoenix Mercury for the second year in a row by a score of 96–86.

In 2019, Thomas once again re-signed with the Sun. On June 26, 2019, Thomas scored a season-high 19 points in a 74–73 victory against the Dallas Wings. By the end of the season, the Sun were a championship contender in the league, finished with a 23–11 record and the number 2 seed, receiving a double-bye to the semi-finals. In the semi-finals, the Sun defeated the Los Angeles Sparks in a three-game sweep, advancing to the WNBA Finals for the first time since 2005. The Sun however came up short in hard fought five-game series, losing to the Washington Mystics 3–2.

In 2022, Thomas will miss the remainder of the season after tearing the ACL in her right knee against the Indiana Fever, Thomas will undergo reconstructive surgery on her injured knee. Following the 2022 season, Thomas was traded on January 16, 2023, to the Los Angeles Sparks.

On January 18, 2024, Thomas announced her retirement from professional basketball.

On Jan. 19, 2024, the Dallas Wings announced their hiring of Thomas as the organization’s Director of Player Programs and Development Coach.

=== Overseas ===
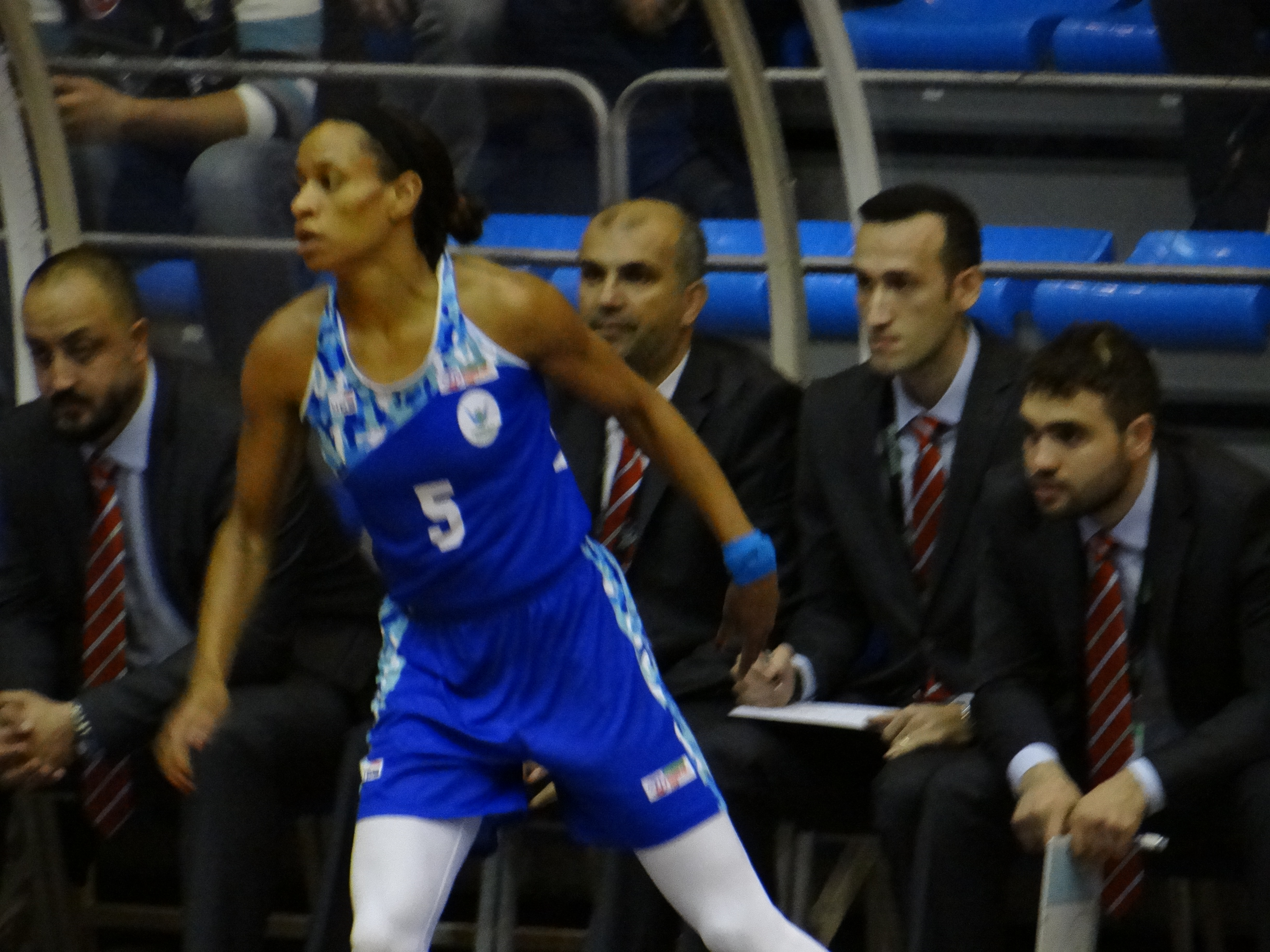
Thomas playing for Ormanspor against Fenerbahçe (2017)

In the 2011-12 WNBA off-season, Thomas played in Czech Republic for Sika Brno. In the 2012-13 WNBA off-season, Thomas played in Russia for Vologda Chevakata. In the 2014-15 WNBA off-season, Thomas played in Turkey for Orman Gençlik. In the 2015-16 WNBA off-season, Thomas played in Israel for Bnot Herzliya. As of August 2016, Thomas signed with Ramat Hasharon of the Israeli League for the 2016-17 WNBA off-season. In 2017, Thomas once again signed with Orman Gençlik of the Turkish league for the 2017-18 WNBA off-season. In August 2018, Thomas signed with CCC Polkowice of the Polish league for the 2018-19 off-season.

== Career statistics ==
Legend
GP	Games played	GS	Games started	MPG	Minutes per game	RPG	Rebounds per game
APG	Assists per game	SPG	Steals per game	BPG	Blocks per game	PPG	Points per game
TO	Turnovers per game	FG%	Field-goal percentage	3P%	3-point field-goal percentage	FT%	Free-throw percentage
**Bold**	Career best	°	League leader

=== WNBA ===
==== Regular season ====
Year	Team	GP	GS	MPG	FG%	3P%	FT%	RPG	APG	SPG	BPG	TO	PPG
2011	Washington	**34**	6	19.3	.353	.312	.667	2.1	1.9	0.7	0.2	1.6	6.4
2012	Washington	**34**	23	22.4	.379	.365	.674	2.4	2.8	0.8	0.2	2.1	8.2
2013	Atlanta	**34**	29	27.5	.359	.216	.696	3.0	3.1	0.8	0.2	2.0	8.5
2014	Atlanta	**34**	23	17.5	.323	.255	.714	2.1	1.6	0.4	0.1	1.1	4.8
2015	Connecticut	**34**	**34**	26.7	.328	.298	.783	3.7	3.9	1.2	**0.4**	2.2	8.2
2016	Connecticut	**34**	**34**	**32.1**	.408	.297	..875	**4.1**	**5.1**	1.2	0.3	2.5	11.7
2017	Connecticut	32	31	28.2	**.421**	**.403**	.781	2.3	4.3	**1.5**	0.1	2.3	**14.2**
2018	Connecticut	**34**	**34**	28.1	.398	.311	.855	3.3	4.8	1.0	0.2	2.5	12.9
2019	Connecticut	**34**	**34**	29.7	.392	.366	.800	2.9	**5.1**	1.4	0.1	2.7	11.1
2020	Connecticut	19	19	25.5	.404	.333	.913	1.7	4.0	1.3	0.3	2.4	10.2
2021	Connecticut	30	30	29.6	.386	.400	.875	2.4	4.1	1.3	0.2	2.2	10.6
2022	Connecticut	5	5	21.8	.267	.385	**.923**	2.2	3.0	0.6	0.2	1.4	6.6
2023	Los Angeles	32	7	12.8	.273	.242	.909	1.1	1.3	0.3	0.2	**0.7**	2.7
Career	13 years, 4 teams	390	309	24.9	.377	.328	.797	2.6	3.5	1.0	0.2	2.0	9.0

==== Postseason ====
Year	Team	GP	GS	MPG	FG%	3P%	FT%	RPG	APG	SPG	BPG	TO	PPG
2013	Atlanta	**8**	**8**	29.0	.310	.000	.700	2.9	2.1	0.8	0.7	2.5	6.4
2014	Atlanta	3	2	22.5	.421	.333	.625	3.0	**3.3**	0.6	0.0	1.3	7.3
2017	Connecticut	1	1	38.4	.368	.000	.500	3.0	3.0	**4.0**	**1.0**	**0.0**	**15.0**
2018	Connecticut	1	1	**35.1**	.357	**.500**	**1.000**	5.0	2.0	1.0	**1.0**	2.0	14.0
2019	Connecticut	**8**	**8**	34.7	.435	.389	.533	3.3	**5.6**	1.1	0.0	2.1	12.8
2020	Connecticut	7	7	32.0	**.451**	.325	.800	2.1	4.4	1.1	0.1	1.9	14.7
2021	Connecticut	4	4	34.3	.256	.222	.778	3.3	3.5	**2.0**	0.5	3.3	8.3
Career	7 years, 2 teams	32	31	31.6	.384	.296	.679	2.9	3.8	1.1	0.3	2.2	10.6

=== College ===
Year	Team	GP	Points	FG%	3P%	FT%	RPG	APG	SPG	BPG	PPG
2007–08	Duke	35	277	.351	.247	.604	2.8	2.3	1.5	**0.9**	7.9
2008–09	Duke	30	307	.361	.286	.743	2.7	3.3	1.7	0.2	10.2
2009–10	Duke	**36**	**577**	.387	.356	**.791**	**4.3**	**4.1**	**2.8**	0.2	**16.0**
2010–11	Duke	**36**	543	**.388**	**.392**	.661	3.9	3.4	2.4	0.6	15.1
Career		137	1,704	.376	.322	.715	3.4	3.3	2.1	0.5	12.4
