= 2012 WNBA season =

- League: Women's National Basketball Association
- Sport: Basketball
- Duration: May 18 – October 21, 2012
- Games: 34
- Teams: 12
- Total attendance: 1,520,112
- Average attendance: 7,452
- TV partner(s): ABC, ESPN, NBA TV

Draft
- Top draft pick: (United States) Nneka Ogwumike
- Picked by: Los Angeles Sparks

Regular season
- Top seed: Minnesota Lynx
- Season MVP: (United States) Tina Charles (Connecticut)
- Top scorer: (United States) Angel McCoughtry (Atlanta)

Playoffs
- Finals champions: Indiana Fever
- Runners-up: Minnesota Lynx
- Finals MVP: (United States) Tamika Catchings (Indiana)

WNBA seasons
- ← 2011 2013 →

The 2012 WNBA season was the 16th season of the Women's National Basketball Association. The regular season began on May 18 and concluded on September 23 and playoffs started on September 27 and concluded on October 21.

== 2011–2012 WNBA offseason ==
- The new television deal with ESPN continued during the 2012 season (runs 2009–2016). For the first time ever, teams will be paid rights fees as part of this deal.
- On January 3, 2012, the Tulsa Shock named former Indiana assistant coach Gary Kloppenburg head coach.
- On January 5, 2012, the Los Angeles Sparks named former Atlanta assistant coach Carol Ross head coach.
- The Seattle Storm trade three time WNBA champion Swin Cash to the Chicago Sky.
- The New York Liberty played home games for the next two seasons at Prudential Center in Newark, New Jersey, due to summer renovations at Madison Square Garden.

== Draft ==
The WNBA Draft lottery was held on November 10, 2011. The lottery teams were the Tulsa Shock, Minnesota Lynx (from Wash.), Chicago Sky and Los Angeles Sparks. The top pick was awarded to Los Angeles.

The 2012 WNBA Draft was held on April 16, 2012, in Bristol, Connecticut. Coverage of the first round was shown on ESPN (HD). Second and third round coverage was shown on ESPNU and NBA TV.

== Regular season ==
Due to the 2012 Summer Olympics, there was no All-Star Game this season as the Olympiad caused a break from mid-July through August.

=== Standings ===
Eastern Conference	W	L	PCT	GB	Home	Road	Conf.
Connecticut Sun ^{y}	25	9	.735	–	12–5	13–4	18–4
Indiana Fever ^{x}	22	12	.647	3.0	13–4	9–8	15–7
Atlanta Dream ^{x}	19	15	.559	6.0	11–6	8–9	12–10
New York Liberty ^{x}	15	19	.441	10.0	9–8	6–11	10–12
Chicago Sky ^{o}	14	20	.412	11.0	7–10	7–10	8–14
Washington Mystics ^{o}	5	29	.147	20.0	4–13	1–16	3–19

Western Conference	W	L	PCT	GB	Home	Road	Conf.
Minnesota Lynx ^{z}	27	7	.794	–	16–1	11–6	17–5
Los Angeles Sparks ^{x}	24	10	.706	3.0	16–1	8–9	15–7
San Antonio Silver Stars ^{x}	21	13	.618	6.0	12–5	9–8	14–8
Seattle Storm ^{x}	16	18	.471	11.0	10–7	6–11	11–11
Tulsa Shock ^{o}	9	25	.265	18.0	6–11	3–14	5–17
Phoenix Mercury ^{o}	7	27	.206	20.0	3–14	4–13	4–18

== Playoffs ==
**Conference semifinals** Best-of-3
E1	**Connecticut**	2
E4	New York	0
**Eastern Conference**
E2	**Indiana**	2
E3	Atlanta	1
W1	**Minnesota**	2
W4	Seattle	1
**Western Conference**
W2	**Los Angeles**	2
W3	San Antonio	0

**Conference finals** Best-of-3
E1	Connecticut	1
E2	**Indiana**	2
W1	**Minnesota**	2
W2	Los Angeles	0

**WNBA Finals**; Best-of-5
E2	**Indiana**	3
W1	Minnesota	1

- **Bold** – Series winner
- Italic – Team with home-court advantage

== Awards ==
=== Individual ===
Award		Winner	Team	Position	Votes/Statistic
Most Valuable Player (MVP)		Tina Charles	Connecticut Sun	Center	25 out of 41
Finals MVP		Tamika Catchings	Indiana Fever	Forward	
Rookie of the Year		Nneka Ogwumike	Los Angeles Sparks	Forward	Unanimous
Most Improved Player		Kristi Toliver	Los Angeles Sparks	Guard	24 out of 41
Defensive Player of the Year		Tamika Catchings	Indiana Fever	Forward	19 out of 41
Sixth Woman of the Year		Renee Montgomery	Connecticut Sun	Guard	23 out of 41
Kim Perrot Sportsmanship Award		Kara Lawson	Connecticut Sun	Guard	18 out of 41
Peak Performers	**Scoring**	Angel McCoughtry	Atlanta Dream	Guard/Forward	21.4 PPG
Peak Performers	**Rebounding**	Tina Charles	Connecticut Sun	Center	10.5 RPG
Peak Performers	**Assists**	Lindsay Whalen	Minnesota Lynx	Guard	5.4 APG
Coach of the Year		Carol Ross	Los Angeles Sparks	Coach	15 out of 41

=== Team ===
Award		Guard	Guard	Forward	Forward	Center
**All-WNBA**	**First Team**	Cappie Pondexter	Seimone Augustus	Candace Parker	Tamika Catchings	Tina Charles
**All-WNBA**	**Second Team**	Kristi Toliver	Lindsay Whalen	Maya Moore	Sophia Young	Sylvia Fowles
**All-Defensive**	**First Team**	Briann January	Alana Beard	Tamika Catchings	Sancho Lyttle	Sylvia Fowles
**All-Defensive**	**Second Team**	Danielle Robinson	Armintie Price	Sophia Young	Candace Parker	Tina Charles
**All-Rookie Team**		Samantha Prahalis	Riquna Williams	Tiffany Hayes	Nneka Ogwumike	Glory Johnson

=== Players of the Week ===
Week ending	Eastern Conference		Western Conference	
Week ending	Player	Team	Player	Team
May 27	Tamika Catchings	Indiana Fever	Candace Parker	Los Angeles Sparks
June 3	Epiphanny Prince (2)	Chicago Sky	DeWanna Bonner	Phoenix Mercury
June 10	Epiphanny Prince (2)	Chicago Sky	Nneka Ogwumike	Los Angeles Sparks
June 17	Tina Charles	Connecticut Sun	Candace Parker (3)	Los Angeles Sparks
June 24	Tamika Catchings (2)	Indiana Fever	Candace Parker (3)	Los Angeles Sparks
July 1	Angel McCoughtry	Atlanta Dream	Sophia Young	San Antonio Silver Stars
July 8	Tina Charles (3)	Connecticut Sun	Becky Hammon	San Antonio Silver Stars
July 15	Tina Charles (3)	Connecticut Sun	Candace Parker (4)	Los Angeles Sparks
August 20	Tamika Catchings (3)	Indiana Fever	Maya Moore	Minnesota Lynx
August 26	Sancho Lyttle	Atlanta Dream	Kristi Toliver	Los Angeles Sparks
September 2	Tamika Catchings (4)	Indiana Fever	DeWanna Bonner (2)	Phoenix Mercury
September 9	Lindsey Harding	Atlanta Dream	Maya Moore (2)	Minnesota Lynx
September 16	Cappie Pondexter	New York Liberty	Nneka Ogwumike (2)	Los Angeles Sparks
September 23	Tina Charles (4)	Connecticut Sun	Candace Parker (5)	Los Angeles Sparks

=== Players of the Month ===
Month	Eastern Conference		Western Conference	
Month	Player	Team	Player	Team
May	Sylvia Fowles	Chicago Sky	Candace Parker (3)	Los Angeles Sparks
June	Tina Charles (2)	Connecticut Sun	Candace Parker (3)	Los Angeles Sparks
July	Tina Charles (2)	Connecticut Sun	Candace Parker (3)	Los Angeles Sparks
August	Tamika Catchings	Indiana Fever	Kristi Toliver	Los Angeles Sparks
September	Cappie Pondexter	New York Liberty	Candace Parker (4)	Los Angeles Sparks

=== Rookies of the Month ===
Month	Player	Team
May	Nneka Ogwumike	Los Angeles Sparks
June	Samantha Prahalis	Phoenix Mercury
July	Nneka Ogwumike (4)	Los Angeles Sparks
August	Nneka Ogwumike (4)	Los Angeles Sparks
September	Nneka Ogwumike (4)	Los Angeles Sparks

== Coaches ==
=== Eastern Conference ===
- Atlanta Dream: Marynell Meadors and Fred Williams
- Chicago Sky: Pokey Chatman
- Connecticut Sun: Mike Thibault
- Indiana Fever: Lin Dunn
- New York Liberty: John Whisenant
- Washington Mystics: Trudi Lacey

=== Western Conference ===
- Los Angeles Sparks: Carol Ross
- Minnesota Lynx: Cheryl Reeve
- Phoenix Mercury: Corey Gaines
- San Antonio Silver Stars: Dan Hughes
- Seattle Storm: Brian Agler
- Tulsa Shock: Gary Kloppenburg

== See also ==
- WNBA
- WNBA draft
- WNBA All-Star Game
- WNBA Playoffs
- WNBA Finals
