= 2013 Washington Mystics season =

Sports season

- Coach: Mike Thibault
- Arena: Verizon Center
- Attendance: per game

Results
- Record: 17–17 (.500)
- Place: 4th (Eastern)
- Playoff finish: Lost in Conference Semis (0-2 to Atlanta Dream)

Media
- Television: CSN-MA; ESPN2, NBATV

The 2013 WNBA season was the 16th season for the Washington Mystics of the Women's National Basketball Association. The Mystics improved significantly over their 2012 season, and qualified for the playoffs for the first time since 2010.

Although they lost the Conference Semifinals to Atlanta in 3 games, the Mystics won their first playoff game since 2004.

== Transactions ==
=== WNBA draft ===
The following are the Mystics' selections in the 2013 WNBA draft.

Round	Pick	Player	Nationality	School/team/country
1	4	Tayler Hill	United States	Ohio State
2	17	Nadira McKenith	United States	St. John's
2	19	Emma Meesseman	Belgium	Villeneuve-d'Ascq (France)

=== Trades ===
Date	Trade	
TBD	To Washington Mystics	To TBD
TBD	TBD	TBD

=== Personnel changes ===
==== Additions ====
Player	Signed	Former team

==== Subtractions ====
Player	Left	New team

== Roster ==
2013 Washington Mystics roster
Players
Coaches

Pos.	No.	Nat.	Name	Height	Weight	DOB	From	Yrs
G	22	(Liberia)	Ajavon, Matee	5' 8" (1.73m)	160 lb (73kg)	1986-05-07	Rutgers	4
F	25	(United States)	Currie, Monique	6' 0" (1.83m)	177 lb (80kg)	1983-02-25	Duke	6
G	4	(United States)	Hill, Tayler	5' 10" (1.78m)	145 lb (66kg)	1990-10-23	Ohio State	R
F/C	1	(United States)	Langhorne, Crystal	6' 2" (1.88m)	190 lb (86kg)	1986-10-27	Maryland	4
G	12	(United States)	Latta, Ivory	5' 6" (1.68m)	143 lb (65kg)	1984-09-25	North Carolina	5
G	5	(United States)	McKenith, Nadirah	5' 7" (1.7m)	155 lb (70kg)	1991-09-06	St. John's	R
C	33	(Belgium)	Meesseman, Emma	6' 4" (1.93m)	182 lb (83kg)	1993-05-13	Belgium	R
C	10	(Turkey)	Hollingsworth, Quanitra	6' 5" (1.96m)	200 lb (91kg)	1988-11-15	VCU	3
G	44	(United States)	Ruffin-Pratt, Tierra	5' 10" (1.78m)	183 lb (83kg)	1991-04-11	North Carolina	R
F/C	2	(United States)	Snow, Michelle	6' 5" (1.96m)	158 lb (72kg)	1980-03-20	Tennessee	10
C	9	(United States)	Vaughn, Kia	6' 4" (1.93m)	198 lb (90kg)	1987-01-24	Rutgers	3

Head coach
(United States) Mike Thibault (Saint Martin's)
Assistant coaches
(United States) Marianne Stanley (Immaculata)
(United States) Eric Thibault (Missouri)
Athletic trainer
(United States) Navin Hettiarachchi (West Virginia)
Strength and conditioning coach
(United States) Michael Bugielski (Illinois State)

Legend

- (C) Team captain
- (DP) Unsigned draft pick
- (FA) Free agent
- (S) Suspended
- Injured

=== Depth ===
Pos.	Starter	Bench
C	Kia Vaughn	Emma Meesseman
PF	Crystal Langhorne	Michelle Snow
SF	Monique Currie	Jessica Moore
SG	Matee Ajavon	Tayler Hill; Nadirah McKenith
PG	Ivory Latta	Tierra Ruffin-Pratt

== Season standings ==
#	Eastern Conference					
#	Team	W	L	PCT	GB	GP
1	z-Chicago Sky	24	10	.706	-	34
2	x-Atlanta Dream	17	17	.500	7	34
3	x-Washington Mystics	17	17	.500	7	34
4	x-Indiana Fever	16	18	.471	8	34
5	e-New York Liberty	11	23	.324	13	34
6	e-Connecticut Sun	10	24	.294	14	34

== Schedule ==
=== Preseason ===
2013 pre-season game log
Total: 1–1 (Home: 1–0; Road: 0–1)
Pre-season: 1–1 (Home: 1–0; Road: 0–1)

Game	Date	Team	Score	High points	High rebounds	High assists	Location Attendance	Record
1	May 15	Brazil	W 71–56	Hill & Meesseman (12)	Monique Currie (7)	Monique Currie (6)	Verizon Center; 3509	1–0
2	May 18	@ Minnesota	L 57–74	Kia Vaughn (10)	Vaughn & Hill (7)	Tayler Hill (3)	Bismarck Civic Center; 1513	1–1

2013 season schedule

=== Regular season ===
2013 game log
Total: 17–17 (Home: 10–7; Road: 7–10)
May: 1–0 (Home: 0–0; Road: 1–0)

Game	Date	Team	Score	High points	High rebounds	High assists	Location Attendance	Record
1	May 27	@ Tulsa	W 95–90 (OT)	Ivory Latta (27)	Crystal Langhorne (9)	Currie, Latta, Meesseman, & Ajavon (3)	BOK Center; 7381	1–0

June : 4–6 (Home: 3–2; Road: 1–4)

Game	Date	Team	Score	High points	High rebounds	High assists	Location Attendance	Record
2	June 2	Atlanta	L 63–73	Crystal Langhorne (15)	Vaughn & Meesseman (6)	Ivory Latta (7)	Verizon Center; 8938	1–1
3	June 7	@ Connecticut	W 66–62	Ivory Latta (17)	Ivory Latta (7)	Matee Ajavon (4)	Mohegan Sun Arena; 6150	2–1
4	June 8	Minnesota	W 85–80	Ivory Latta (24)	Currie, Langhorne, & Vaughn (6)	Ivory Latta (5)	Verizon Center; 7870	3–1
5	June 16	Indiana	W 64–60	Ivory Latta (17)	Currie & Langhorne (9)	Monique Currie (5)	Verizon Center; 6649	4–1
6	June 18	@ Seattle	L 86–96 (OT)	Crystal Langhorne (23)	Langhorne & Snow (7)	Ivory Latta (6)	Key Arena; 4579	4–2
7	June 21	@ Phoenix	L 82–90	Ivory Latta (22)	Monique Currie (8)	Ivory Latta (5)	US Airways Center; 9636	4–3
8	June 23	@ Los Angeles	L 69–79	Langhorne & Hill (16)	Crystal Langhorne (13)	Langhorne, Latta, Ajavon, & Hill (4)	Staples Center; 9651	4–4
9	June 27	Phoenix	L 97–101	Crystal Langhorne (27)	Currie & Latta (6)	Ivory Latta (9)	Verizon Center; 7950	4–5
10	June 28	@ Atlanta	L 75–86	Monique Currie (20)	Crystal Langhorne (5)	Ruffin-Pratt & McKenith (3)	Philips Arena; 5512	4–6
11	June 30	Tulsa	W 84–61	Ivory Latta (15)	Currie, Langhorne, & Snow (8)	Matee Ajavon (3)	Verizon Center; 6511	5–6

July : 4–4 (Home: 3–2; Road: 1–2)

Game	Date	Team	Score	High points	High rebounds	High assists	Location Attendance	Record
12	July 6	Seattle	W 62–59	Crystal Langhorne (12)	Michelle Snow (13)	Latta & Ajavon (3)	Verizon Center; 6174	6–6
13	July 10	@ Chicago	L 85–89	Crystal Langhorne (18)	Crystal Langhorne (8)	Ivory Latta (6)	Allstate Arena; 14201	6–7
14	July 12	@ San Antonio	W 83–73	Crystal Langhorne (14)	Kia Vaughn (8)	Matee Ajavon (5)	AT&T Center; 11268	7–7
15	July 16	San Antonio	W 86–64	Langhorne & Ruffin-Pratt (13)	Crystal Langhorne (9)	Tayler Hill (5)	Verizon Center; 6843	8–7
16	July 19	@ Indiana	L 70–77	Ivory Latta (16)	Crystal Langhorne (7)	Ivory Latta (3)	Bankers Life Fieldhouse; 6434	8–8
17	July 21	Indiana	L 52–65	Monique Currie (15)	Michelle Snow (7)	Ajavon & Hill (2)	Verizon Center; 6516	8–9
18	July 24	Chicago	W 82–78	Ivory Latta (18)	Monique Currie (9)	Ivory Latta (13)	Verizon Center; 14411	9–9
All-Star Break
19	July 31	NY Liberty	L 78–88	Matee Ajavon (20)	Kia Vaughn (12)	Emma Meesseman (4)	Verizon Center; 6711	9–10

August : 5–5 (Home: 2–2; Road: 3–3)

Game	Date	Team	Score	High points	High rebounds	High assists	Location Attendance	Record
20	August 2	@ Chicago	L 78–85	Matee Ajavon (19)	Michelle Snow (6)	Ivory Latta (6)	Allstate Arena; 5134	9–11
21	August 4	Los Angeles	L 57–75	Crystal Langhorne (23)	Crystal Langhorne (7)	Ivory Latta (5)	Verizon Center; 7092	9–12
22	August 6	@ NY Liberty	L 88–93	Crystal Langhorne (24)	Crystal Langhorne (11)	Ivory Latta (4)	Prudential Center; 8907	9–13
23	August 8	@ Minnesota	W 79–75	Ivory Latta (24)	Michelle Snow (11)	Matee Ajavon (5)	Target Center; 8723	10–13
24	August 11	Connecticut	W 74–63	Crystal Langhorne (18)	Langhorne & Snow (9)	Matee Ajavon (8)	Verizon Center; 7725	11–13
25	August 16	@ NY Liberty	W 66–57	Matee Ajavon (16)	Monique Currie (7)	Latta & Ajavon (7)	Prudential Center; 6157	12–13
26	August 18	@ Atlanta	L 58–76	Ivory Latta (12)	Crystal Langhorne (9)	Latta & McKenith (3)	Philips Arena; 4873	12–14
27	August 20	Chicago	L 73–79	Kia Vaughn (21)	Crystal Langhorne (9)	Ivory Latta (5)	Verizon Center; 6471	12–15
28	August 23	Atlanta	W 74–64	Monique Currie (15)	Kia Vaughn (10)	Ivory Latta (4)	Verizon Center; 7088	13–15
29	August 28	@ Atlanta	W 85–80 (OT)	Currie, Latta, & Hill (15)	Crystal Langhorne (10)	Ivory Latta (10)	Philips Arena; 4415	14–15

September: 3–2 (Home: 2–1; Road: 1–1)

Game	Date	Team	Score	High points	High rebounds	High assists	Location Attendance	Record
30	September 6	@ Connecticut	L 70–77	Crystal Langhorne (16)	Crystal Langhorne (11)	Ajavon, Hill, Meesseman, & McKenith (2)	Mohegan Sun Arena; 5611	14–16
31	September 8	Chicago	L 79–93	Ivory Latta (18)	Kia Vaughn (8)	Ivory Latta (7)	Verizon Center; 9060	14–17
32	September 10	@ Indiana	W 69–67	Vaughn & Latta (15)	Crystal Langhorne (10)	Ivory Latta (4)	Bankers Life Fieldhouse; 8444	15–17
33	September 13	Connecticut	W 82–56	Ivory Latta (19)	Kia Vaughn (10)	Ivory Latta (5)	Verizon Center; 7779	16–17
34	September 15	NY Liberty	W 70–52	Tayler Hill (16)	Kia Vaughn (12)	Emma Meesseman (3)	Verizon Center; 9454	17–17

2013 season schedule

=== Playoffs ===
2013 playoff game log
Total: 1–2 (Home: 0–1; Road: 1–1)
Conference Semifinals: 1–2 (Home: 0–1; Road: 1–1)

Game	Date	Team	Score	High points	High rebounds	High assists	Location Attendance	Series
1	September 19	@ Atlanta	W 71–56	Ivory Latta (14)	Crystal Langhorne (15)	Ivory Latta (7)	Philips Arena; 3862	1–0
2	September 21	Atlanta	L 45–63	Tayler Hill (11)	Vaughn & Snow (6)	Nadirah McKenith (3)	Verizon Center; 7065	1–1
3	September 23	@ Atlanta	L 72–80	Monique Currie (22)	Crystal Langhorne (6)	Matee Ajavon (5)	Philips Arena; 4078	1–2

2013 season schedule

== Statistics ==
Legend
GP	Games played	GS	Games started	MPG	Minutes per game	RPG	Rebounds per game
APG	Assists per game	SPG	Steals per game	BPG	Blocks per game	PPG	Points per game
FG%	Field-goal percentage	3P%	3-point field-goal percentage	FT%	Free-throw percentage	TO	Turnovers per game
PF	Fouls per game		Team leader		League leader

=== Regular season ===
Player	GP	GS	MPG	FG%	3P%	FT%	RPG	APG	SPG	BPG	PPG

== Awards and honors ==
- WNBA All-Stars: Crystal Langhorne, Ivory Latta
