= Joslyn Tinkle =

American basketball player (born 1990)

UNLV Lady Rebels
- Position: Assistant coach
- League: Mountain West Conference

Personal information
- Born: December 29, 1990 (age 35) Stockholm, Sweden
- Listed height: 6 ft 3 in (1.91 m)
- Listed weight: 170 lb (77 kg)

Career information
- High school: Big Sky (Missoula, Montana)
- College: Stanford (2009–2013)
- Playing career: 2013–2016
- Coaching career: 2021–present

Career history

Playing
- 2013: Seattle Storm
- 2013–2014: UNI Györ
- 2014–2015: Canik Belediye
- 2015–2016: Sydney Uni Flames

Coaching
- 2021–2024: Montana (asst. coach)
- 2024–2025: Pepperdine (asst. coach)
- 2025–Present: UNLV (asst. coach)

Career highlights
- All Pac-12 (2013); McDonald's All-American (2009)
- Stats at Basketball Reference
Medals
Women's basketball
Representing United States
FIBA Under-18 Americas Championship
Gold medal – first place	2008 Argentina	Team

Joslyn Elise Tinkle (born December 29, 1990) is an American professional basketball player who most recently played for Seattle Storm of the WNBA. She is the daughter of men's head coach Wayne Tinkle of Oregon State University.

== Early life ==
Tinkle was born in Stockholm, Sweden, and she lived in Europe for eight years. Her family then moved to Montana where she attended Big Sky High School in Missoula.

== Playing career ==
Tinkle played college basketball for Stanford University.

Tinkle was a member of the USA Women's U18 team which won the gold medal at the FIBA Americas Championship in Buenos Aires, Argentina. The event was held in July 2008, when the USA team defeated host Argentina to win the championship. Tinkle helped the team win all five games, averaging 7.2 points per game.

She signed with Seattle on August 24, 2013.

== Coaching career ==
Tinkle was hired to be an assistant coach for the Montana Lady Griz basketball team in 2021, where her parents played for the Grizzlies in the 1980s.

In May 2024, she was hired to be an assistant coach for the Pepperdine Waves women's basketball team.

== Personal life ==
Joslyn is the daughter of Wayne Tinkle, former professional basketball player in Europe and current head coach at Oregon State University. She has a sister, Elle, who played for Gonzaga University in Spokane, Washington, and a brother, Tres, who played for their father at Oregon State. Joslyn graduated from Stanford with a double major in Communications and Sociology.

== Career statistics ==
=== College ===
Legend
GP	Games played	GS	Games started	MPG	Minutes per game
FG%	Field goal percentage	3P%	3-point field goal percentage	FT%	Free throw percentage
RPG	Rebounds per game	APG	Assists per game	SPG	Steals per game
BPG	Blocks per game	PPG	Points per game	**Bold**	Career high

Year	Team	GP	Points	FG%	3P%	FT%	RPG	APG	SPG	BPG	PPG
2009–10	Stanford	34	27	44.1%	34.5%	53.3%	2.9	0.5	0.3	0.8	4.6
2010–11	Stanford	35	192	44.2%	31.6%	66.7%	2.8	1.4	0.3	0.3	5.5
2011–12	Stanford	**37**	321	**47.3%**	**39.7%**	**89.5%**	5.4	1.3	0.7	1.3	8.7
2012–13	Stanford	36	**423**	46.1%	32.2%	77.3%	**5.7**	**1.6**	**0.8**	**1.8**	**11.8**
Career		142	963	45.7%	34.1%	78.4%	4.3	1.2	0.5	1.1	6.8

=== WNBA ===
==== Regular season ====
Year	Team	GP	GS	MPG	FG%	3P%	FT%	RPG	APG	SPG	BPG	TO	PPG
2013	Seattle	6	0	1.8	.000	.000	–	.5	.0	.0	.0	.0	.0

==== Playoffs ====
Year	Team	GP	GS	MPG	FG%	3P%	FT%	RPG	APG	SPG	BPG	TO	PPG
2013	Seattle	1	0	2.0	.000	–	–	.0	.0	.0	.0	.0	.0
