= Tierra Ruffin-Pratt =

American basketball player (born 1991)

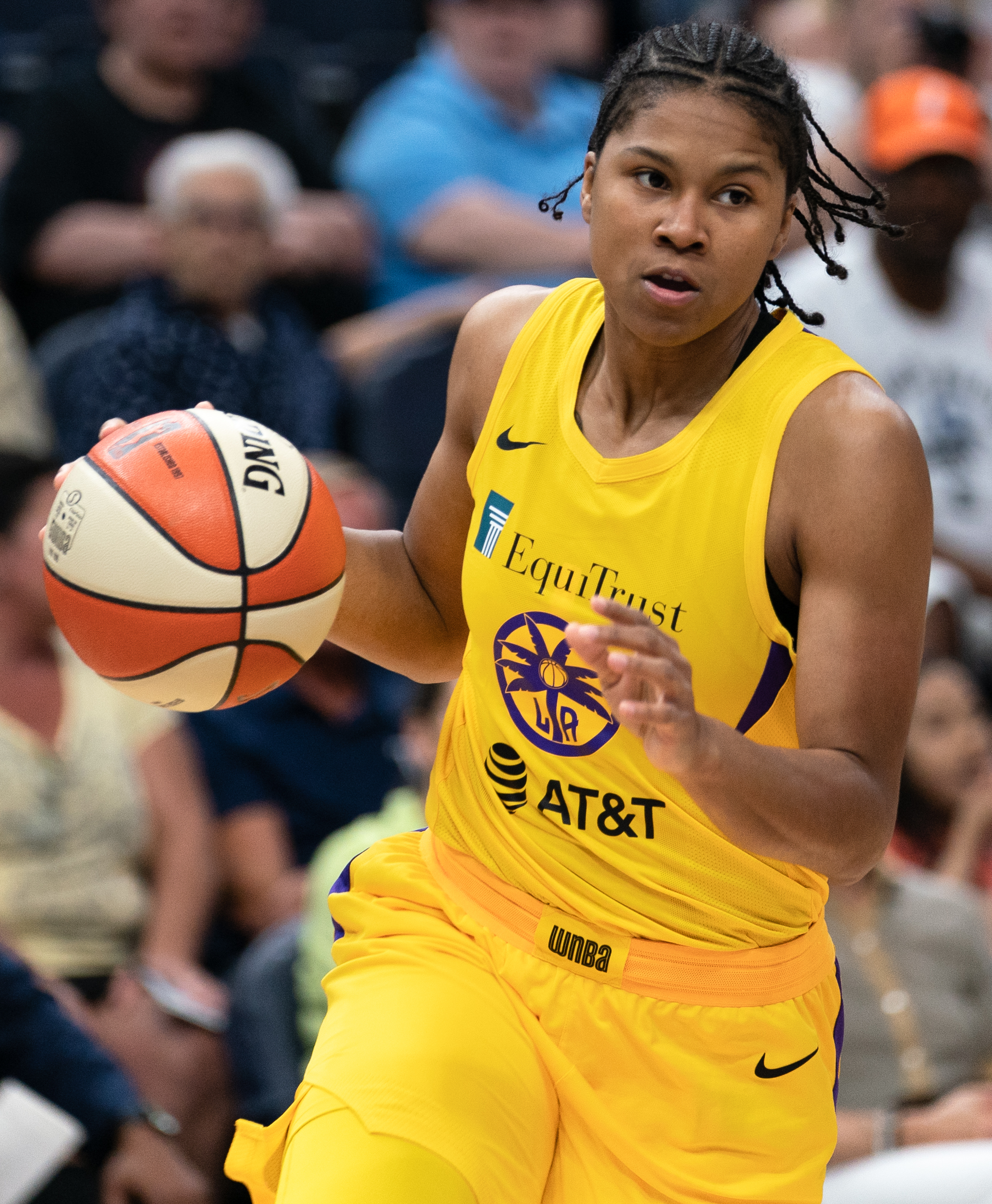
- Ruffin-Pratt with the Los Angeles Sparks in 2019

Personal information
- Born: April 11, 1991 (age 35) Alexandria, Virginia, U.S.
- Listed height: 5 ft 11 in (1.80 m)
- Listed weight: 180 lb (82 kg)

Career information
- High school: T. C. Williams (Alexandria, Virginia)
- College: North Carolina (2009–2013)
- WNBA draft: 2013: undrafted
- Playing career: 2013–2022
- Position: Shooting guard
- Number: 44, 14, 10

Career history
- 2013–2018: Washington Mystics
- 2019–2020: Los Angeles Sparks

Career highlights
- First-team All-ACC (2013); McDonald's All-American Game Co-MVP (2009)
- Stats at WNBA.com
- Stats at Basketball Reference

Tierra Ruffin-Pratt (born April 11, 1991) is an American former professional basketball player. She played for the Washington Mystics and the Los Angeles Sparks in the Women's National Basketball Association (WNBA). She played college basketball at the University of North Carolina and attended T. C. Williams High School in Alexandria, Virginia.

== College statistics ==
Legend
GP	Games played	GS	Games started	MPG	Minutes per game
FG%	Field goal percentage	3P%	3-point field goal percentage	FT%	Free throw percentage
RPG	Rebounds per game	APG	Assists per game	SPG	Steals per game
BPG	Blocks per game	PPG	Points per game	**Bold**	Career high

Year	Team	GP	Points	FG%	3P%	FT%	RPG	APG	SPG	BPG	PPG
2009–10	North Carolina	30	189	31.2	13.3	54.9	5.5	1.5	1.3	0.3	6.3
2010–11	North Carolina	**36**	224	33.7	12.5	67.2	**6.6**	2.4	1.1	0.3	6.2
2011–12	North Carolina	18	153	31.3	10.5	65.9	5.1	2.8	2.1	**1.0**	8.5
2012–13	North Carolina	35	**541**	**37.9**	**24.2**	**69.7**	3.7	**4.5**	**2.7**	0.8	**15.5**
Career	North Carolina	119	1107	34.5	16.9	66.4	5.3	2.9	1.8	0.5	9.3

== Professional career ==
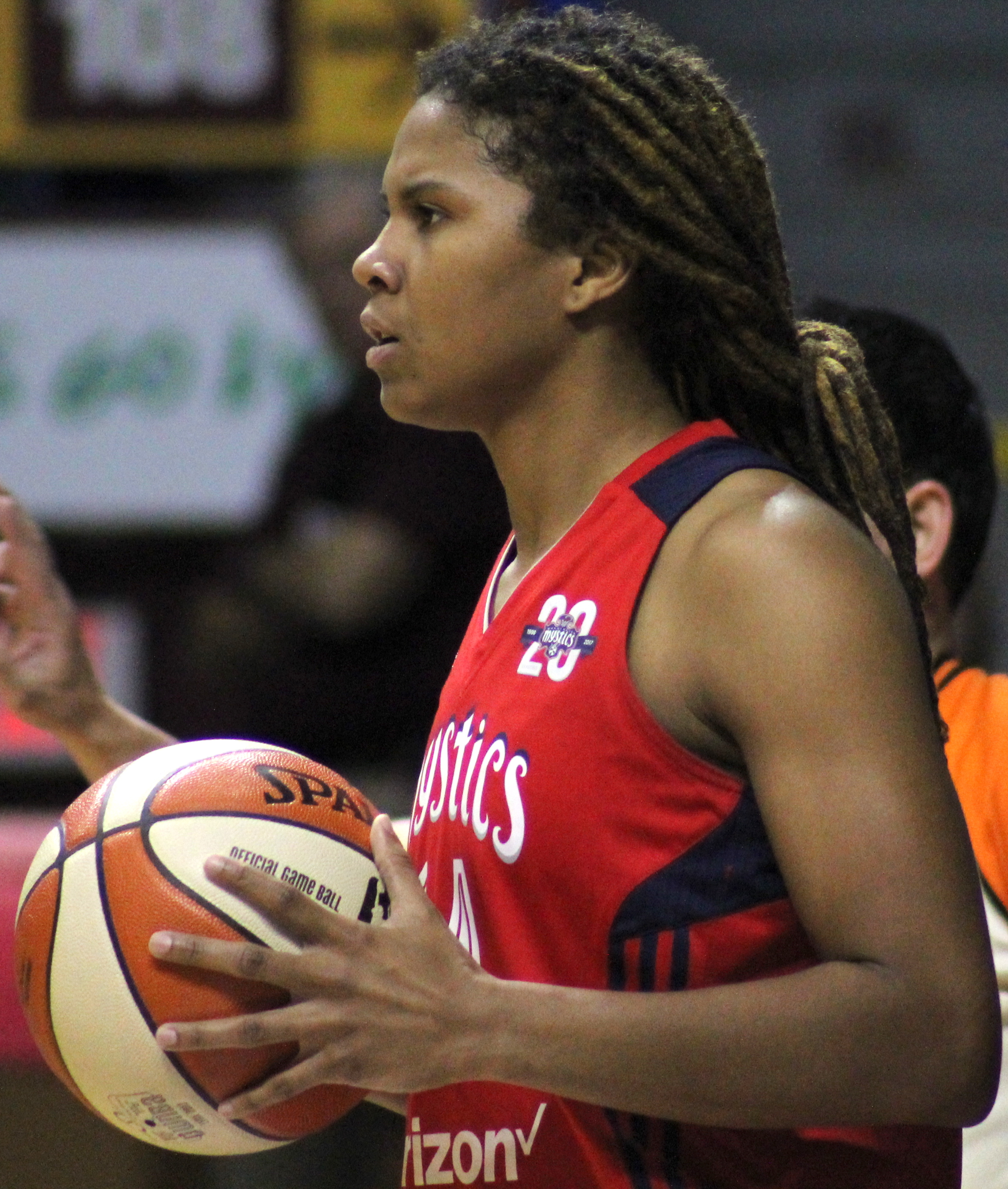
Ruffin-Pratt with the Washington Mystics in 2017

Ruffin-Pratt joined the Washington Mystics training camp roster in May 2013 after going undrafted in the 2013 WNBA draft. In her rookie season, she played 34 games off the bench and averaged 4.4 ppg That year the Mystics made the playoffs finishing 3rd place in the Eastern Conference with a 17–17 record but were eliminated 2–1 in the first round by the Atlanta Dream.

In her second season, Ruffin-Pratt continued her bench role with her playing time slightly increased. She averaged 4.5 ppg in 34 games and 6 starts. The Mystics were third place in the Eastern Conference yet again with a 16–18 record, but were eliminated in a 2-game sweep by the Indiana Fever.

In the 2015 season, Ruffin-Pratt became the starting shooting guard for the Mystics. She played 32 games with 31 starts and averaged a career-high in scoring. Ruffin-Pratt scored a career-high 20 points in an 84–80 win against the Los Angeles Sparks on June 23, 2015. The Mystics made the playoffs finishing 4th place in the Eastern Conference with an 18–16 record and were a first round exit yet again as they were defeated 2-1 by the New York Liberty.

In the 2016 season, Ruffin-Pratt moved to small forward in the Mystics starting lineup in order to make room for Tayler Hill at shooting guard. Ruffin-Pratt averaged 7.3 ppg in her new role at the wing, but the Mystics finished 13-21 and were eliminated from playoff contention.

In 2017, Ruffin-Pratt re-signed with the Mystics once her rookie contract expired. During the 2017 season, Ruffin-Pratt started in all 34 games for the first time in her career. She briefly played the small forward role in the Mystics starting lineup during one of their starters' absence. After Hill tore her ACL, Ruffin-Pratt moved back to shooting guard. She averaged 7.3 ppg and the Mystics made the playoffs with an 18–16 record and the number 6 seed in the league following the league's new playoff format the previous season. The Mystics advanced all the way to the semi-finals after defeating the Dallas Wings and New York Liberty in the first and second round elimination games, marking the first time in franchise history the Mystics advanced past the second round. In the semi-finals, the Minnesota Lynx defeated the Mystics in a 3-game sweep.

In 2018, Ruffin-Pratt was a role player for the Mystics, occasionally starting and coming off the bench. Her contributions helped the Mystics to a 22–12 record and the number 3 seed in the league. They received a bye to the second round. In the second round elimination game, they defeated the Los Angeles Sparks 96–64 to advance to the semi-finals for the second year in a row. In the semi-finals, the Mystics defeated the Atlanta Dream in five games to advance to the WNBA Finals for the first time in franchise history. In the Finals, the Seattle Storm swept the Mystics.

In 2019, Ruffin-Pratt signed with the Los Angeles Sparks. She would immediately enter the Sparks' starting lineup. Ruffin-Pratt started in 33 of the 34 games played during the season, the Sparks finished 22–12 with the number 3 seed, receiving a bye to the second round. In the second round elimination game, the Sparks defeated the defending champion Seattle Storm 92–69 to advance to the semi-finals. In the semi-finals, the Sparks would lose to the Connecticut Sun in a three-game sweep.

In 2020, the season was delayed and shortened to 22 games in a bubble due to the COVID-19 pandemic. Ruffin-Pratt played 17 games with 10 starts, missing a few games with a shoulder injury. The Sparks were the number 3 seed with a 15–7 record, receiving a bye to the second round elimination game, but were once again eliminated by the Connecticut Sun.

On May 22, 2022, Ruffin-Pratt announced her retirement from professional basketball.

== WNBA career statistics ==
Legend
GP	Games played	GS	Games started	MPG	Minutes per game	RPG	Rebounds per game
APG	Assists per game	SPG	Steals per game	BPG	Blocks per game	PPG	Points per game
TO	Turnovers per game	FG%	Field-goal percentage	3P%	3-point field-goal percentage	FT%	Free-throw percentage
**Bold**	Career best	°	League leader

=== WNBA regular season ===
Year	Team	GP	GS	MPG	FG%	3P%	FT%	RPG	APG	SPG	BPG	PPG
2013	Washington	**34**	0	14.8	.359	.143	.783	2.8	0.8	0.7	0.2	4.4
2014	Washington	**34**	6	16.2	**.383**	.250	.705	2.9	1.3	0.7	0.1	4.5
2015	Washington	32	31	23.9	.371	.326	.759	3.0	2.2	0.8	0.3	**7.4**
2016	Washington	32	31	24.4	.369	.320	.747	4.5	**2.6**	**1.0**	0.3	7.3
2017	Washington	**34**	**34**	24.3	.337	.000	.738	**5.3**	2.3	**1.0**	0.5	7.3
2018	Washington	33	10	18.1	.341	.314	**.855**	2.0	1.5	0.6	0.2	5.5
2019	Los Angeles	**34**	33	**25.2**	.367	.342	.854	2.4	1.7	0.8	**0.6**	6.0
2020	Los Angeles	17	10	14.5	.267	**.462**	.731	2.1	0.9	0.7	0.2	2.9
Career		250	155	20.5	.357	.318	.768	3.2	1.7	0.8	0.3	5.8

=== WNBA postseason ===
Year	Team	GP	GS	MPG	FG%	3P%	FT%	RPG	APG	SPG	BPG	PPG
2013	Washington	3	0	15.0	.385	.000	.583	2.0	0.7	1.0	0.0	5.7
2014	Washington	2	0	10.6	.000	.000	**1.000**	3.5	1.0	0.0	0.5	1.0
2015	Washington	3	3	**26.9**	.333	**.333**	**1.000**	3.7	**3.7**	**1.6**	0.0	8.0
2017	Washington	5	**5**	26.8	**.457**	.000	.824	**5.0**	2.4	0.6	0.8	**9.2**
2018	Washington	**9**	0	17.4	.385	.235	**1.000**	2.2	0.8	0.7	0.3	5.2
2019	Los Angeles	4	4	18.0	.280	.182	.857	1.8	2.0	0.5	0.8	5.5
2020	Los Angeles	1	0	13.0	.000	.000	.000	2.0	3.0	0.0	**1.0**	0.0
Career		27	12	19.4	.358	.216	.800	2.9	1.7	0.7	0.4	5.9
