= Tayler Hill =

American basketball player (born 1990)

Personal information
- Born: October 23, 1990 (age 36) Minneapolis, Minnesota, U.S.
- Listed height: 5 ft 9 in (1.75 m)
- Listed weight: 145 lb (66 kg)

Career information
- High school: South (Minneapolis, Minnesota)
- College: Ohio State (2009–2013)
- WNBA draft: 2013: 1st round, 4th overall pick
- Drafted by: Washington Mystics
- Playing career: 2013–2020
- Position: Shooting guard

Career history
- 2013–2018: Washington Mystics
- 2013: Ramat Hasharon
- 2016–2017: Bnot Hertzeliya
- 2018–2020: Dallas Wings
- 2020: New York Liberty

Career highlights
- 2× First-team All-Big Ten (2012, 2013); 3× Big Ten All-Defensive Team (2011–2013); McDonald's All-American (2009); Minnesota Miss Basketball (2009); 2× Minnesota Gatorade Player of the Year (2008, 2009); 2× AP Minnesota Player of the Year (2008, 2009)
- Stats at WNBA.com
- Stats at Basketball Reference

Tayler Hill (born October 23, 1990) is an American former professional basketball player. Hill played for the Washington Mystics, Dallas Wings, and New York Liberty of the Women's National Basketball Association (WNBA). She played college basketball for the Ohio State Buckeyes. Hill was a McDonald's All-American coming out of high school and left high school as the all-time leading scorer in Minnesota basketball history with 3,888 points. She was selected fourth overall in the 2013 WNBA draft by the Mystics.

== Personal life ==
On December 6, 2013, the Washington Mystics announced that Hill was pregnant with her first child, with her boyfriend David Lighty. The child was born June 18, 2014.

== High school career ==
Hill joined the team as an 8th grader. Hill won the state scoring title her sophomore and senior years and led South to a 139–14 record in her five-year career. After two consecutive Minnesota State High School League Class AAAA state championship losses to St. Paul Central, Minneapolis South got what they longed for by beating Centennial High School 68–61 in the 2009 class AAAA state final. Tayler Hill led all scorers, tying the all-time tournament record for most points in a single game with 47. Hill broke several Minnesota high school records in her senior season, including most career points with 3,894, most points in a single season with 1,053, and most free throw makes and attempts in a single season (270/350).

Hill was a two-time Gatorade Minnesota Girls Basketball Player of the Year.

Hill, the number 7 overall recruit by Full Court Press and the number 12 overall recruit by ESPN chose Ohio State over Minnesota, Duke, Texas, and Marquette.

== College career ==
As a freshman, Hill started all 36 games for the Buckeyes. During her freshman campaign, Hill averaged 8.5 points, 2.8 rebounds, 1.7 assists and 1.0 steal. Hill increased her scoring each year that she was at Ohio State, and during her senior season she averaged 22.3 points per game.

During her time at Ohio State, Hill was honored as a member of the Big Ten All-Defensive Team, three consecutive seasons. She also was a member of the Big Ten First Team during her junior and senior seasons. In her junior year, she hit 41.8% of her three-point field goal attempts, which placed her third best among the nation's Division I women's basketball players.

== College statistics ==
Legend
| GP | Games played | GS | Games started | MPG | Minutes per game |
| FG% | Field goal percentage | 3P% | 3-point field goal percentage | FT% | Free throw percentage |
| RPG | Rebounds per game | APG | Assists per game | SPG | Steals per game |
| BPG | Blocks per game | PPG | Points per game | **Bold** | Career high |

| Year | Team | GP | Points | FG% | 3P% | FT% | RPG | APG | SPG | BPG | PPG |
|---|---|---|---|---|---|---|---|---|---|---|---|
| 2009-10 | Ohio State | **36** | 307 | 42.3 | 28.8 | 70.8 | 2.8 | 1.7 | 1.0 | 0.3 | 8.5 |
| 2010-11 | Ohio State | 34 | 421 | 40.1 | 28.7 | 77.6 | **4.3** | **3.6** | 1.6 | 0.4 | 12.4 |
| 2011-12 | Ohio State | 32 | **653** | **47.5** | **41.8** | 77.0 | 4.2 | 2.3 | **2.5** | **0.5** | 20.4 |
| 2012-13 | Ohio State | 30 | 634 | 40.5 | 31.7 | **82.4** | **4.3** | 2.9 | 2.2 | **0.5** | **21.1** |
| Career | Ohio State | 132 | 2015 | 42.9 | 34.3 | 77.8 | 3.9 | 2.6 | 1.8 | 0.4 | 15.3 |

== Professional career ==
=== WNBA ===
In the 2013 WNBA draft, Hill was drafted fourth overall by the Washington Mystics. After starting the season in the starting lineup, Hill moved to a reserve role and has provided a spark along with fellow rookies Emma Meesseman, Tierra Ruffin-Pratt and Nadirah McKenith. She finished the season, averaging 6.5 ppg off the bench.

In December 2013, it was announced that Hill became pregnant with her first child, which caused her to miss nearly the entire 2014 season, but was able to make her return in August 2014, three months after giving birth and played the remainder of the season and including one playoff game.

In the 2015 season, Hill returned to peak condition, playing 32 games and averaging 7.5 ppg as a reserve for the Mystics.

In 2016, Hill would become the Mystics' starting shooting guard and have a breakout season. On August 27, 2016, in a loss against the San Antonio Stars, Hill scored a career high 26 points.

Hill would finish second place in voting for the WNBA Most Improved Player Award and led the Mystics in scoring with a career-high 15.4 ppg throughout the season. Despite her efforts, the Mystics finished 13–21, making it the first time in four years where they haven't made the playoffs.

In February 2017, Hill re-signed with the Mystics in free agency, who also acquired Elena Delle Donne and Kristi Toliver during the offseason, adding more offensive firepower to the team. On June 18, 2017, Hill scored a season-high of 21 points in an 87–83 loss to the Dallas Wings. On July 18, 2017, Hill suffered a torn ACL while playing against the Indiana Fever, she was ruled out for the rest of the season.

Hill made her return on June 19, 2018, in the Mystics' season opener against the Chicago Sky, she scored 6 points off the bench in an 88–60 victory. On July 23, 2018, Hill was traded to the Dallas Wings, along with draft picks in exchange for Aerial Powers.

On April 15, 2020, Hill was traded to the New York Liberty along with two draft pick as part of a three team deal that also included the Washington Mystics. The Wings received a draft pick from both the Liberty and Mystics in return.

=== Overseas ===
In the 2013–14 WNBA off-season, Hill briefly played in Israel for Ramat Hasharon before returning home after the start of her pregnancy. In August 2016, Hill signed with Bnot Hertzeliya of the Israeli League for the 2016-17 WNBA off-season.

== WNBA career statistics ==
Legend
| GP | Games played | GS | Games started | MPG | Minutes per game | RPG | Rebounds per game |
| APG | Assists per game | SPG | Steals per game | BPG | Blocks per game | PPG | Points per game |
| TO | Turnovers per game | FG% | Field-goal percentage | 3P% | 3-point field-goal percentage | FT% | Free-throw percentage |
| **Bold** | Career best | ° | League leader |

=== Regular season ===
| Year | Team | GP | GS | MPG | FG% | 3P% | FT% | RPG | APG | SPG | BPG | TO | PPG |
|---|---|---|---|---|---|---|---|---|---|---|---|---|---|
| 2013 | Washington | **34** | 7 | 17.4 | .328 | .333 | .843 | 1.7 | 1.5 | 0.6 | 0.0 | 1.1 | 6.5 |
| 2014 | Washington | 5 | 0 | 7.8 | .077 | .143 | **1.000** | 0.2 | 0.4 | 0.2 | 0.0 | **0.0** | 1.0 |
| 2015 | Washington | 32 | 0 | 17.0 | **.348** | .319 | .726 | 1.3 | 0.9 | 0.9 | 0.0 | 0.8 | 7.5 |
| 2016 | Washington | **34** | **32** | **29.3** | **.348** | **.351** | .829 | **2.6** | **2.9** | **1.0** | **0.1** | 1.2 | **15.4** |
| 2017 | Washington | 18 | 16 | 25.6 | .361 | .303 | .938 | 1.9 | 2.6 | 0.8 | 0.0 | 1.4 | 13.3 |
| 2018* | Washington | 13 | 0 | 9.0 | .282 | .286 | .917 | 0.6 | 1.0 | 0.2 | 0.1 | 0.8 | 3.0 |
| 2018* | Dallas | 7 | 1 | 16.9 | .289 | .292 | 1.000 | 1.0 | 1.0 | 0.1 | 0.1 | 0.9 | 5.0 |
| 2018 | Total | 20 | 1 | 11.8 | .286 | .289 | .929 | 0.8 | 1.0 | 0.2 | **0.1** | 0.9 | 3.7 |
| Career | 6 years, 2 teams | 141 | 56 | 19.9 | .339 | .325 | .841 | 1.7 | 1.7 | 0.8 | 0.1 | 1.1 | 9.0 |

=== Playoffs ===
| Year | Team | GP | GS | MPG | FG% | 3P% | FT% | RPG | APG | SPG | BPG | TO | PPG |
|---|---|---|---|---|---|---|---|---|---|---|---|---|---|
| 2013 | Washington | **3** | 0 | 18.2 | .368 | .333 | .500 | 1.7 | **0.7** | **1.0** | 0.0 | **0.3** | 6.3 |
| 2014 | Washington | 1 | 0 | 4.2 | .000 | .000 | .000 | 1.0 | 2.0 | 0.0 | 0.0 | 0.0 | 0.0 |
| 2015 | Washington | **3** | 0 | **26.4** | **.435** | **.462** | **.833** | **3.0** | **0.7** | 0.3 | **0.3** | 1.0 | **12.0** |
| Career | 3 years, 1 team | 7 | 0 | 19.7 | .386 | .385 | .786 | 2.1 | 0.9 | 0.6 | 0.1 | 0.6 | 7.9 |
