= Brock Coyle =

American football player (born 1990)

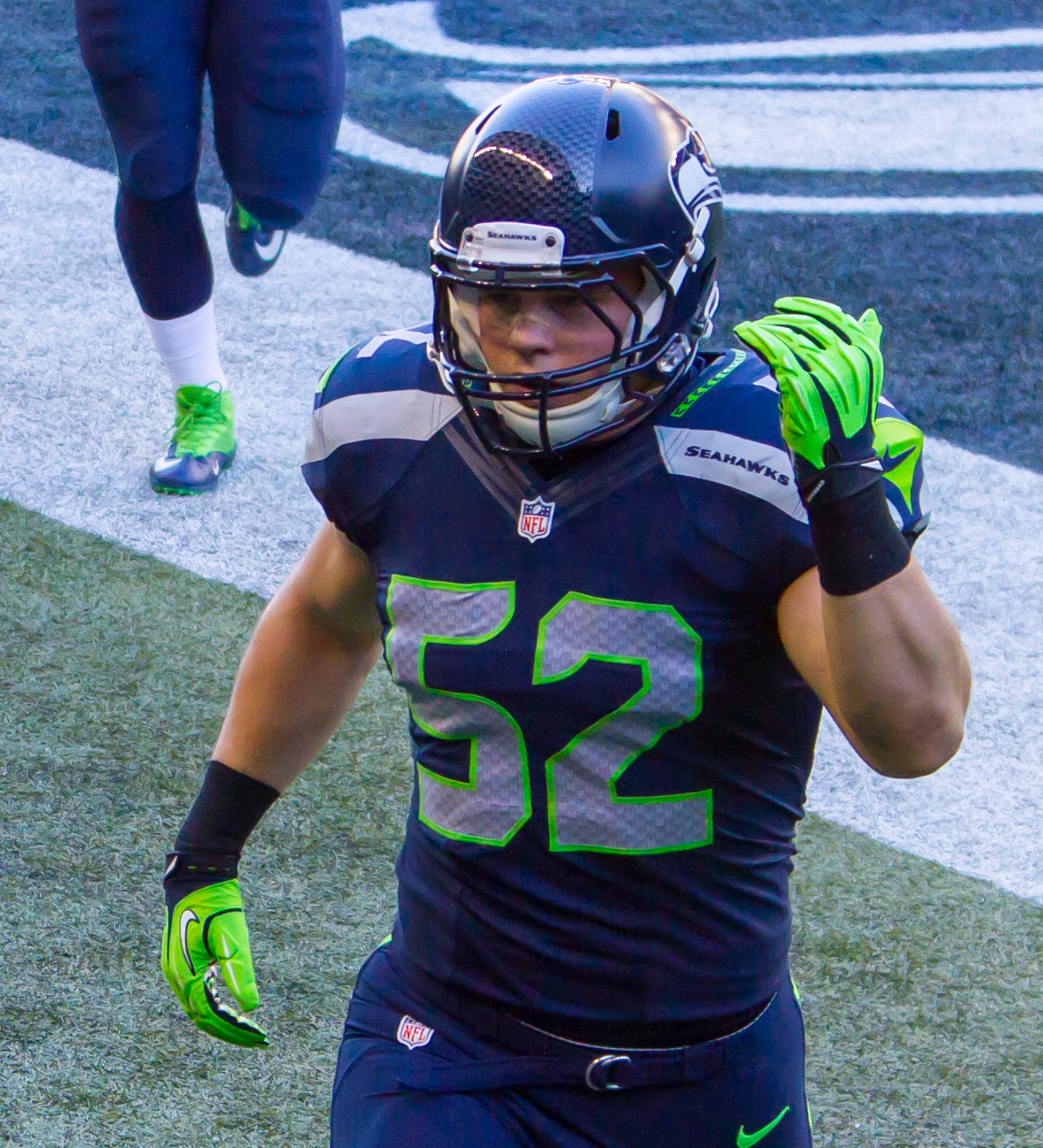
- Coyle with the Seattle Seahawks in 2014

No. 52, 50
- Position: Linebacker

Personal information
- Born: October 12, 1990 (age 36); Norwalk, Connecticut, U.S.
- Listed height: 6 ft 1 in (1.85 m)
- Listed weight: 245 lb (111 kg)

Career information
- High school: Bozeman (Bozeman, Montana)
- College: Montana
- NFL draft: 2014: undrafted

Career history
- Seattle Seahawks (2014–2016); San Francisco 49ers (2017–2018)

Career NFL statistics
- Total tackles: 103
- Sacks: 1.5
- Forced fumbles: 1
- Stats at Pro Football Reference

Brock Coyle (born October 12, 1990) is an American former professional football player who was a linebacker in the National Football League (NFL). He played college football for the Montana Grizzlies and signed with the Seattle Seahawks as an undrafted free agent in 2014.

== College career ==
Coyle played college football at the University of Montana in Missoula. As a true freshman in 2009, he collected thirty tackles and two interceptions as a linebacker, then redshirted in 2010 following off-season surgery. In 2011, he played in all fourteen games for the Grizzlies, and was the team's sixteenth leading tackler despite not starting a single game. In 2012, Coyle enjoyed a breakout season when he started eleven games and tallied 107 tackles. His average of 9.73 tackles a game ranked him 28th in the nation, and he was an honorable mention All-Big Sky Conference selection.

As a fifth-year senior in 2013, Coyle had his finest college season with the Grizzlies while starting at inside linebacker, leading the team with 125 total tackles, which put him among the nation's leaders. He forced four fumbles and intercepted two passes, giving him five interceptions for his college football career, and was a second-team All-Big Sky selection.

While at Montana, Coyle was teammates with future NFL linebacker Jordan Tripp and cornerback Trumaine Johnson.

== Professional career ==
Pre-draft measurables
Height	Weight	Arm length	Hand span	40-yard dash	10-yard split	20-yard shuttle	Three-cone drill	Vertical jump	Broad jump	Bench press
6 ft 1 in (1.85 m)	235 lb (107 kg)	32.5 in (0.83 m)	9.38 in (0.24 m)	4.60 s	1.60 s	4.28 s	6.74 s	37.0 in (0.94 m)	9 ft 7 in (2.92 m)	25 reps
All values from 03/18/14 Montana State Pro Day

=== Seattle Seahawks ===
Although Coyle went undrafted in the 2014 NFL draft, he was signed to a professional contract by the Seattle Seahawks just minutes after the draft's completion. Seahawks coaches praised Coyle for his productive play during the NFL preseason while he filled in for injured middle linebacker Bobby Wagner. Coyle started his first NFL regular season game at middle linebacker for the Seattle Seahawks on Sunday November 2, 2014, while playing against the Oakland Raiders.

Coyle had a successful career with the Seahawks, mostly as a core special teamer, while also starting 5 games. Coyle tallied 33 tackles and 1.0 sack in three years. One of Coyle's best games was when he started at Strongside linebacker against the Buffalo Bills. On Monday Night Football, Coyle had his first career sack, along with 8 tackles on the night. When Coyle was given time, Carroll was generally pleased with his play.

=== San Francisco 49ers ===
On March 10, 2017, Coyle signed a one-year contract with the San Francisco 49ers.

On March 14, 2018, Coyle signed a three-year contract extension with the 49ers. He was placed on injured reserve on September 12, 2018, after suffering a concussion in Week 1.

On March 14, 2019, Coyle was released by the 49ers, and subsequently announced his retirement from the NFL, stating that a broken bone in his back prevented him from returning.
