= Jordan Tripp =

American football player (born 1991)

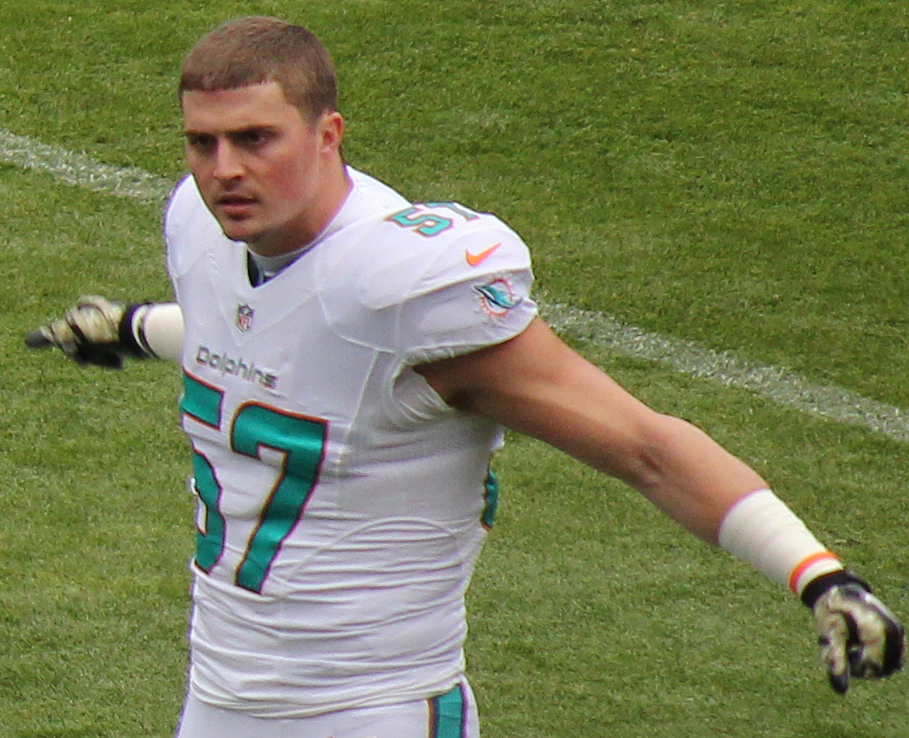
- Tripp with the Miami Dolphins in 2014

No. 57, 58, 59, 52
- Position: Linebacker

Personal information
- Born: April 3, 1991 (age 35); Missoula, Montana, U.S.
- Listed height: 6 ft 3 in (1.91 m)
- Listed weight: 234 lb (106 kg)

Career information
- High school: Missoula (MT) Big Sky
- College: Montana
- NFL draft: 2014: 5th round, 171st overall pick

Career history
- Miami Dolphins (2014); Jacksonville Jaguars (2015); Seattle Seahawks (2016); Green Bay Packers (2016); Atlanta Falcons (2017)

Awards and highlights
- First-team FCS All-American (2013); Third-team FCS All-American (2012); 2× First-team All-Big Sky (2012, 2013)

Career NFL statistics
- Total tackles: 19
- Stats at Pro Football Reference

Jordan Lee Tripp (born April 3, 1991) is an American former professional football player who was a linebacker in the National Football League (NFL). He was selected by the Miami Dolphins in the fifth round of the 2014 NFL draft. He played college football at Montana.

== Early life ==
Tripp attended Big Sky High School in Missoula, Montana, where he was a team captain in football his senior year. He was an all-state and all-conference pick as a senior when he had 72 tackles, including 13 for loss, and 12 sacks.

== College career ==
Tripp attended the University of Montana and played for the Montana Grizzlies football team from 2009 to 2013. While playing at the University of Montana, Tripp was teammates with future NFL linebacker Brock Coyle and cornerback Trumaine Johnson (cornerback).

As a true freshman in 2009, playing in a back-up role, he played in all 15 games, recording 23 tackles, and recovering two fumbles, best for second on the team.

He started all 11 games in 2010 and finished second on the team with 99 tackles. He recorded nine tackles for loss, and led the team with three fumble recoveries.

He started in the first three games of the 2011 season, but was injured against Eastern Washington. He suffered an injury to his shoulder than resulted in him being out for the remainder of the season. He finished the season with 18 tackles, including 1.5 for loss, three pass break-ups, and one fumble recovery. He was granted a medical redshirt after the season.

He started all 11 games in 2012, finishing second on the team with 95 tackles, a team leading 13.5 tackles for loss, 5.5 sacks, one interception for 58 yards, and four forced fumbles. He also returned a fumble 80 yards for a touchdown against Idaho State. His season lead him to being named a first-team All-Big Sky selection, and third-team FCS All-American by the Associated Press.

Prior to the start of the 2013 season, Tripp was named the Big Sky Conference Preseason Defensive MVP. He started all 13 games, recording a career-high 100 tackles, including 5.5 for loss, two sacks, and three interceptions. He recovered three fumbles, one in the endzone against Portland State for a touchdown. He also blocked a field goal late in Montana's 21-14 overtime victory over Cal Poly. After the season, Tripp was named a first-team All-Big Sky selection for the second consecutive season, and was named a first-team FCS All-American by the Associated Press.

== Professional career ==
Pre-draft measurables
Height	Weight	Arm length	Hand span	40-yard dash	10-yard split	20-yard split	20-yard shuttle	Three-cone drill	Vertical jump	Broad jump	Bench press
6 ft 3 in (1.91 m)	234 lb (106 kg)	30 3/4 in (0.78 m)	9 5/8 in (0.24 m)	4.67 s	1.64 s	2.73 s	3.96 s	6.89 s	37 1/2 in (0.95 m)	10 ft 0 in (3.05 m)	22 reps
All values from NFL Combine

=== Miami Dolphins ===
Tripp was selected by the Miami Dolphins in the fifth round (171st overall) of the 2014 NFL draft. He was released by the Dolphins on September 5, 2015 during final roster cuts.

=== Jacksonville Jaguars ===
On October 10, 2015, Tripp was signed by the Jacksonville Jaguars. Tripp earned his first career start on December 13, 2015 against the Colts and recorded four tackles.

On September 3, 2016, Tripp was released by the Jaguars.

=== Seattle Seahawks ===
On September 5, 2016, Tripp was signed to the Seahawks' practice squad. He was promoted to the active roster on October 3, 2016. He was placed on injured reserve on December 3, 2016. He was waived on December 9, 2016.

=== Green Bay Packers ===
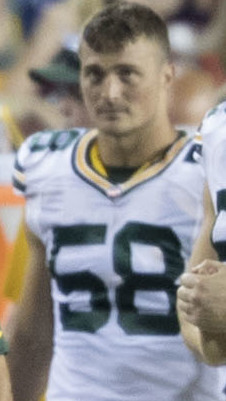
Tripp with the Packers in 2017

On December 14, 2016, Tripp was signed by the Green Bay Packers.

He re-signed with the Packers on March 15, 2017. He was waived on September 2, 2017.

=== Atlanta Falcons ===
On September 5, 2017, Tripp signed with the Atlanta Falcons. He was placed on injured reserve on October 31, 2017 with a concussion.

== Career statistics ==
=== NFL ===
Year	Team	G	GS	Tackles					Interceptions						Fumbles	
Year	Team	G	GS	Total	Solo	Ast	Sck	SFTY	PDef	Int	Yds	Avg	Lng	TDs	FF	FR
2014	MIA	13	0	3	2	1	0.0	0	0	0	0	0	0	0	0	0
2015	JAX	12	1	14	10	4	0.0	0	0	0	0	0	0	0	0	0
2016	SEA	7	1	1	1	0	0.0	0	0	0	0	0	0	0	0	0
2016	GB	2	0	1	1	0	0.0	0	0	0	0	0	0	0	0	0
Total		34	2	19	14	5	0.0	0	0	0	0	0	0	0	0	0
Source: NFL.com

=== College ===
Year	Team	Games	Tackles				Sacks	Pass defense				Fumbles		Blkd	
Year	Team	Games	Solo	Ast	Total	TFL – Yds	No – Yds	Int – Yds	BU	PD	Qbh	Rcv – Yds	FF	Kick	Saf
2009	Montana	15	6	11	23	0 – 0	0 – 0	0 – 0	1	0	0	2 – 0	0	0	0
2010	Montana	11	36	63	99	9.0 – 39	3.5 – 28	1 – 22	3	4	0	3 – 0	0	0	0
2011	Montana	3	6	12	18	1.5 – 2	0 – 0	0 – 0	3	3	0	1 – 0	0	0	0
2012	Montana	11	26	69	95	13.5 – 51	5.5 – 36	1 – 58	2	3	2	1 – 80	4	0	0
2013	Montana	13	41	59	100	5.5 – 15	2.0 – 10	3 – 14	2	5	1	2 – 35	3	1	0
Career		53	115	220	335	29.5 – 107	11.0 – 74	5 – 94	11	15	3	9 – 115	7	1	0

== Personal life ==
He was a third generation football player at Montana. His father, Bryan, was a starting linebacker for the Grizzlies in 1989 and 1990, while his grandfather, Gene, played and lettered at Montana in 1963-64.
