= Big Sky High School =

Location
- 3100 S. Avenue West; Missoula, Montana; United States; 46.8504°N 114.0578°W

Information
- Type: Public
- Motto: Forward Thinking, High Achieving
- Established: 1980
- School district: Missoula County Public Schools District No. 1
- Principal: Jennifer Courtney
- Staff: 82.60 (FTE)
- Enrollment: 1,227 (2023–2024)
- Student to teacher ratio: 14.85
- Color
- Mascot: Eagle
- Website: bigsky.mcpsmt.org

Big Sky High School is an American public high school in Missoula, Montana, United States, opened in 1980. The school made Missoula the first city in Montana to have four secondary schools. It is a part of the Missoula County Public Schools. It is notable because it is the only school in the district to have a pool on the roof.

== Extracurricular activities ==
Band

Bands at Big Sky include Symphonic Band, Wind Ensemble, Jazz Band, Pep Band, and Big Sky Eagle Marching Band. All students in concert bands are required to participate in the marching band. The marching band performs at two football games per year and at the University of Montana homecoming parade. They have traveled to perform in places such as Carnegie Hall in New York City and the Rose Parade in California. In 2014, the band travelled to Honolulu, Hawaii, to perform at the 29th annual Pacific Basin Music Festival along with the choir.

Choir

The school has four different choirs: a beginning men's choir, a beginning women's choir (Chorale), an advanced women's choir (Treble Choir), and a mixed advanced choir (Aesirian Choir). There is also an audition-only extracurricular choir called Sky Blues.

Drama

The drama department has produced over one hundred full-length productions since the school's opening in 1980. They work closely with Way Off Broadway Theater Company. The department has an annual Fall Cabaret Show, where students write or direct the performances. The department does one straight play per year and a musical every other year.

Speech and debate

In the 2014–2015 season the Big Sky speech and debate team grew to be the fourth-largest in the state, in spite of the school having the smallest enrollment in its class.

Athletics

- Boys' basketball
- Boys' soccer
- Cross country
- Football
- Girls' basketball
- Girls' soccer
- Golf
- Softball
- Swimming
- Tennis
- Track and field
- Volleyball
- Wrestling
- Tennis

Gamer's Guild

The Big Sky High School Gamer's Guild is a club that meets during lunch to play Dungeons and Dragons or any other non-video game.

== Notable alumni ==
- Larry Krystkowiak, former NBA player, former Utah men's basketball coach
- Chance McKinney, country singer
- Joslyn Tinkle, WNBA forward for Seattle Storm (daughter of Wayne Tinkle)
- Jordan Tripp, former NFL Linebacker
