= 2004 Washington Mystics season =

- Head coach: Michael Adams
- Arena: MCI Center

Results
- Record: 17–17 (.500)
- Place: 4th (Eastern)
- Playoff finish: Lost First Round (2-1) to Connecticut Sun

The 2004 WNBA season was the seventh for the Washington Mystics. The franchise drafted Alana Beard as the 2nd pick in the 2004 WNBA draft, who later led the team to the playoffs for the first time in two years.

The Mystics won a playoff game this season, something they would not again accomplish until 2013.

Additionally, the Mystics won a home playoff game. Washington would not win another home playoff game until 2017.

This would also be Chamique Holdsclaw's last year as a Mystic.

== Dispersal Draft ==
Based on the Mystics' 2003 record, they would pick 2nd in the Cleveland Rockers dispersal draft. The Mystics picked Chasity Melvin.

== WNBA draft ==
Round	Pick	Player	Nationality	College/School/Team
1	2	Alana Beard (G)	United States	Duke
2	15	Kaayla Chones (C)	United States	North Carolina State
2	28	Evan Unrau (F)	United States	Missouri

== Regular season ==
=== Season standings ===
Eastern Conference	W	L	PCT	GB	Home	Road	Conf.
Connecticut Sun ^{x}	18	16	.529	–	10–7	8–9	14–6
New York Liberty ^{x}	18	16	.529	–	11–6	7–10	10–10
Detroit Shock ^{x}	17	17	.500	1.0	8–9	9–8	11–9
Washington Mystics ^{x}	17	17	.500	1.0	11–6	6–11	9–11
Charlotte Sting ^{o}	16	18	.471	2.0	10–7	6–11	8–12
Indiana Fever ^{o}	15	19	.441	3.0	10–7	5–12	8–12

=== Season schedule ===
Date	Opponent	Score	Result	Record
May 22	Charlotte	68-71	Loss	0-1
May 23	@ Indiana	68-67	Win	1-1
May 25	Los Angeles	79-95	Loss	1-2
May 28	@ Minnesota	62-73	Loss	1-3
June 2	@ Detroit	65-63	Win	2-3
June 4	Connecticut	63-72	Loss	2-4
June 11	Detroit	60-74	Loss	2-5
June 13	New York	62-60	Win	3-5
June 17	San Antonio	76-60	Win	4-5
June 20	@ Connecticut	65-75	Loss	4-6
June 22	@ Detroit	78-72	Win	5-6
June 27	@ Houston	67-72	Loss	5-7
June 30	@ Connecticut	69-78	Loss	5-8
July 1	Indiana	69-64	Win	6-8
July 7	Seattle	72-69	Win	7-8
July 8	@ New York	71-54	Win	8-8
July 10	@ Charlotte	65-67	Loss	8-9
July 15	Charlotte	68-54	Win	9-9
July 17	@ Seattle	83-85 (OT)	Loss	9-10
July 18	@ Sacramento	71-81	Loss	9-11
July 21	@ Los Angeles	76-96	Loss	9-12
July 23	Minnesota	65-61	Win	10-12
July 24	@ Charlotte	41-70	Loss	10-13
July 28	Detroit	65-73	Loss	10-14
July 30	Connecticut	69-68	Win	11-14
August 1	Phoenix	82-62	Win	12-14
September 1	Indiana	58-75	Loss	12-15
September 4	@ Indiana	42-69	Loss	12-16
September 7	Sacramento	67-63 (OT)	Win	13-16
September 9	New York	71-59	Win	14-16
September 12	Houston	75-63	Win	15-16
September 15	@ San Antonio	84-73	Win	16-16
September 17	@ Phoenix	74-67	Win	17-16
September 19	@ New York	75-79	Loss	17-17
September 25; First Round, G1	Connecticut	67-59	Win	1-0
September 27; First Round, G2	@ Connecticut	70-80	Loss	1-1
September 29; First Round, G3	@ Connecticut	56-76	Loss	1-2

== Player stats ==
Player	GP	REB	AST	STL	BLK	PTS
Alana Beard	34	143	91	69	34	446
Chamique Holdsclaw	23	191	56	39	18	437
Chasity Melvin	34	131	37	15	18	293
Stacey Dales	31	64	78	20	3	254
Murriel Page	33	140	36	25	16	184
Nakia Sanford	31	154	18	18	16	169
Coco Miller	33	63	43	18	3	160
Tamicha Jackson	25	37	45	20	1	135
Aiysha Smith	29	69	15	17	12	115
Kiesha Brown	26	50	42	13	2	104
Kaayla Chones	13	17	4	1	4	28
Shaunzinski Gortman	4	4	2	0	1	0
