= Chance McKinney =

American singer-songwriter

- Born: Chance Mckinney; Lolo, Montana, U.S.
- Origin: Seattle, Washington, U.S.
- Genres: Country, Southern rock, Desert rock
- Instrument: Guitar
- Years active: 2009 - present
- Website: www.chancemckinney.com

Chance McKinney is a country music artist from Seattle, Washington. In 2009, while working as a math teacher at Kamiak High School, he entered and won Country Music Television's Music City Madness competition for unsigned artists.

== Early life ==
Chance grew up in Lolo, Montana. He attended Big Sky High School in Missoula. Throughout high school, McKinney was a 3-time National Champion in javelin throwing, an All-state basketball player, and held a 4.0 GPA. Division I All-American javelin thrower in college. He graduated summa cum laude from Washington State University and received a degree in Mathematics and teaching.

== Musical career ==
Prior to entering Country Music Television's contest, McKinney was a member of the band Nathan Chance, which disbanded in September 2009.

Chance McKinney was also a founding member of the now disbanded group Timeless Soul (A Motown/Philly Review) Show. Other founding members of Timeless Soul were Thomas Wray, Charles McNairy & Glen Speed, Jr. Timeless Soul. Other key members of Timeless Soul were George Dowdy, Tripple J and Austin Cooper.

=== CMT's Music City Madness ===
In 2009, Chance McKinney, at the time a math teacher at Kamiak High School in Mukilteo, Washington, entered Country Music Television's Music City Madness competition for unsigned artists with his single, "Be Real". He entered the contest only a few minutes before the deadline. The contest ran from October through December, and he won when he received over one million votes in the final round. McKinney was teaching a class when he learned that he had won the contest. He then took out his guitar and played the song for his students. His students finished the song for him when he became too choked up to sing. He later performed the song at a school pep assembly. As the winner of the contest, McKinney was given the chance to audition for a record company in Nashville, Tennessee.

==== Be Real ====
McKinney wrote the song "Be Real" in 2005 in the back of a van. At the time, he was heading home from coaching a track meet in California. Chance wrote part of the song lyrics on an envelope. He then recorded it on his voice mail while on an airplane flying home when the flight attendant was not paying attention. "Be Real" eventually ended up securing over 1 Million Votes / Views in the final round of CMT's Music City Madness which propelled him to No. 1 on CMT's unsigned singer/songwriter competition.

=== Touring ===
Chance McKinney has toured with Blake Shelton, Luke Bryan, Dierks Bentley, Colt Ford, Trace Adkins, Lynyrd Skynyrd, CCR, Darius Rucker and more... He's played Watershed Music Festival, Bi-Mart Country Music Festival, Oregon Jamboree, Cape Blanco Music Festival and other shows for tens of thousands of spectators in one sitting.

== Personal life ==
Chance married his wife, Lisa, in 2009. They have one daughter and a son. He stands at 6'6". Prior to his country career, McKinney was a trigonometry teacher at Seattle area schools, Skyline High School, Inglemoor High School, Woodinville High School, and Kamiak High School. He was also a University of Washington track coach. As a former Seahawks employee, McKinney is an avid fan of the Seattle Seahawks. He spends his time between Seattle and Hendersonville, Tennessee.

== Discography ==
- Be Real (2010)
- Think About That (2013)
- Down To Get Up (2016)
- I, Chance McKinney (2018)
- I-Squared (2018)

== Charity ==
On Friday, April 4, 2014 he performed a concert to benefit the 2014 Oso mudslide victims at Tulalip Resort Casino where one hundred percent of more than $16,000 in proceeds were donated to victims and their families.
