= 2009 McDonald's All-American Girls Game =

West	East
69	68
	1st half	2nd half	Total
West	31	38	69
East	30	38	68
- Date: April 1, 2009
- Venue: BankUnited Center, Miami, Florida
- MVP: Skylar Diggins, Tierra Ruffin-Pratt
- Referees: Marc McClenney; Ron Leddington; Tina Harrington
- Attendance: 5,981
- Network: ESPN

McDonald's All-American

The 2009 McDonald's All-American Girls Game was an All-star basketball game played on Wednesday, April 1, 2009, at the BankUnited Center in Miami, Florida, home of the University of Miami Hurricanes. The game's rosters featured the best and most highly recruited high school girls graduating in 2009. The game was the 8th annual version of the McDonald's All-American Game first played in 2002.

The 48 players were selected from 2,500 nominees by a committee of basketball experts. They were chosen not only for their on-court skills, but for their performances off the court as well. Coach Morgan Wootten, who had more than 1,200 wins as head basketball coach at DeMatha High School, was chairman of the selection committee. Legendary UCLA coach John Wooden, who has been involved in the McDonald's All American Games since its inception, served as chairman of the Games and as an advisor to the selection committee.

Proceeds from the 2009 McDonald's All American High School Basketball Games went to Ronald McDonald House Charities (RMHC) of South Florida and its Ronald McDonald House program.

== 2009 Game ==
The game was telecast live by ESPN. The West Team grabbed a hard-fought 69–68 victory in the opener at the BankUnited Center. The contest was close throughout and came down to a missed free throw with seconds remaining. Kelly Faris (Connecticut) was fouled as she was forced to take a desperation 3-pointer with two seconds to go. After nailing the first two shots, the third came up short and so did the frantic comeback of the East Team.

In a game that was dominated by defense, the West Squad managed to get double figure scoring from only five players. Taber Spani (Tennessee), Christina Marinacci (USC) and DeNesha Stallworth (California) led the offensive attack with 11 points each, while Gennifer Brandon (California) added 10. Tierra Ruffin-Pratt (North Carolina) poured in 10 points and grabbed a team high 10 rebounds.

The East Team was led by Skylar Diggins (Notre Dame), who scored 18 points, grabbed five rebounds and nabbed three steals. Morgan Wootten Player of the Year Kelsey Bone (South Carolina) and TaShauna Rodgers (Georgetown) contributed with 10 points and five rebounds each. Kelly Faris provided an all-around solid performance, as she paced the East in rebounds with seven, added four points, three steals, three assists and two blocks in just 15 minutes of play.

For their efforts, Skylar Diggins and Tierra Ruffin-Pratt were selected as the John R. Wooden MVP's of the game. Unable to play due to injury, Stephanie Holzer (Vanderbilt) was given the Naismith Sportsmanship Award for her involvement in the week's events and for the support she displayed towards her fellow All Americans.

=== 2009 West Roster ===
ESPNW 100 Rank	#	Name	Height	Weight (lbs.)	Position	Hometown	High School	College Choice
30	25	Gennifer Brandon	6–3	160	F	Sylmar, CA	Chatsworth	Cal
14	11	China Crosby	5-5	121	G	Bronx, NY	Manhattan Center for Science & Mathematics	Virginia
1	42	Brittney Griner	6–8	200	C	Houston, TX	Nimitz	Baylor
12	3	Tayler Hill	5–10	155	G	Minneapolis, MN	Minneapolis South	Ohio State
90	21	Stephanie Holzer	6–4	190	C	Newtown Square, PA	Cardinal O'Hara	Vanderbilt
35	00	Christina Marinacci	6–2	155	F	Santa Ana, CA	Foothill	USC
6	34	Monique Oliver	6–2	200	C	Long Beach, CA	Long Beach Polytechnic	USC
22	1	Eliza Pierre	5–8	135	G	Pasadena, CA	John Muir	Cal
20	12	Tierra Rogers	5–11	160	F	San Francisco, CA	Sacred Heart Cathedral Prep	Cal
9	4	Tierra Ruffin-Pratt	6–0	175	G	Alexandria, VA	T.C. Williams	North Carolina
13	33	Taber Spani	6–1	180	G	Lee's Summit, MO	Metro Academy	Tennessee
24	50	DeNesha Stallworth	6–3	190	F	Richmond, CA	Pinole Valley	Cal

=== 2009 East Roster ===
ESPNW 100 Rank	#	Name	Height	Weight (lbs.)	Position	Hometown	High School	College Choice
2	5	Kelsey Bone	6–5	210	C	Stafford, TX	Dulles	South Carolina, transferred to Texas A&M
3	4	Skylar Diggins	5–9	145	G	South Bend, IN	South Bend Washington	Notre Dame
34	34	Kelly Faris	5–11	150	G	Plainfield, IN	Heritage Christian School	Connecticut
11	12	Jasmine Hassell	6–2	205	F	Lebanon, TN	Wilson Central	Georgia
5	45	Cokie Reed	6–4	200	C	Hewitt, TX	Midway	Texas
26	15	TaShauna Rogers	5–11	163	G	Suffolk, VA	King's Fork	Georgetown
33	32	Morgan Stroman	6–2	163	F	Hopkins, SC	Lower Richland	Miami (FL)
52	2	Dara Taylor	5–7	135	G	Wilmington, DE	Caravel Academy	Maryland
10	44	Joslyn Tinkle	6–3	190	F	Missoula, MT	Big Sky	Stanford
4	23	Markel Walker	6–2	165	F	Pittsburgh, PA	Schenley	UCLA
39	3	Erica Wheeler	5–8	141	G	Miami, FL	Parkway Academy	Rutgers
8	24	Destiny Williams	6–3	181	C	Benton Harbor, MI	Benton Harbor	Illinois, transferred to Baylor

=== Coaches ===
The West team was coached by:

- Head Coach Dave Power of Fenwick High School (Oak Park, IL)
- Asst Coach Dale Heidloff of Fenwick High School (Oak Park, IL)
- Asst Coach Derril Kipp of Maine West High School (Des Plaines, IL)

The East team was coached by:

- Head Coach Abby Ward of South Broward High School (Hollywood, FL)
- Asst Coach Jermaine Hollis of South Broward High School (Hollywood, FL)
- Asst Coach Patricia James of Boyd H. Anderson High School (Lauderdale Lakes, FL)

=== Boxscore ===
==== Visitors: West ====
##	Player	FGM/A	3PM/A	FTM/A	Points	Off Reb	Def Reb	Tot Reb	PF	Ast	TO	BS	ST	Min
3	*Tayler Hill	1/ 6	1/3	0/ 0	3	1	0	1	2	1	0	0	2	18
4	*Tierra Ruffin-Pratt	5/15	0/ 3	0/ 0	10	3	7	10	3	2	2	0	2	23
11	*China Crosby	1/ 5	0/ 3	0/ 0	2	0	4	4	5	2	4	1	0	21
33	*Taber Spani	3/12	2/ 5	3/ 4	11	3	1	4	2	0	5	0	2	22
34	*Monique Oliver	2/13	0/ 1	0/ 0	4	2	4	6	1	0	0	2	2	20
00	Christina Marinacci	3/ 7	3/ 5	2/ 2	11	3	2	5	0	1	3	2	3	18
1	Eliza Pierre	1/ 2	0/ 0	1/ 2	3	1	2	3	2	5	0	1	4	19
12	Tierra Rogers	1/ 7	0/ 0	2/ 2	4	5	3	8	1	1	3	1	1	18
21	Stephanie Holzer	/	/	/	0			0						
25	Gennifer Brandon	3/ 8	0/ 0	4/ 5	10	3	2	5	0	2	1	1	1	20
42	Brittney Griner													
50	DeNesha Stallworth	5/11	1/ 1	0/ 0	11	1	2	3	0	0	2	0	1	21
	Team					10	5	15			1			
	TOTALS	25/86	7/21	12/15	69	32	32	64	16	14	21	8	18	200

==== Home: East ====
##	Player	FGM/A	3PM/A	FTM/A	Points	Off Reb	Def Reb	Tot Reb	PF	Ast	TO	BS	ST	Min
2	*Dara Taylor	0/ 3	0/ 3	0/ 0	0	2	0	2	0	1	3	1	0	19
4	*Skylar Diggins	6/13	2/ 5	4/ 5	18	1	4	5	4	0	3	0	3	21
5	*Kelsey Bone	5/15	0/ 0	0/ 0	10	4	1	5	1	0	1	3	1	19
23	*Markel Walker	1/ 3	0/ 0	2/ 2	4	2	4	6	0	1	0	1	2	15
34	*Kelly Faris	1/ 4	0/ 0	2/ 3	4	2	5	7	2	3	2	2	3	15
3	Erica Wheeler	1/ 5	1/ 4	0/ 0	3	0	1	1	2	1	3	0	0	15
12	Jasmine Hassell	3/ 4	0/ 0	0/ 0	6	0	1	1	2	0	1	0	1	14
15	TaShauna Rogers	3/ 9	3/ 6	1/ 2	10	0	5	5	2	1	2	0	0	20
24	Destiny Williams	0/ 2	0/ 0	1/ 2	1	2	2	4	0	0	3	0	1	12
32	Morgan Stroman	1/ 2	0/ 0	1/ 4	3	2	1	3	1	1	1	1	1	17
44	Joslyn Tinkle	3/ 7	1/ 2	0/ 0	7	0	5	5	0	1	1	5	0	21
45	Cokie Reed	1/ 8	0/ 0	0/ 0	2	2	2	4	1	0	1	4	0	14
	Team					3	3	6			1			
	TOTALS	25/75	7/20	11/18	68	20	34	54	15	9	22	17	12	202

(* = Starting Line-up)

== All-American Week ==
=== Schedule ===
- Tuesday, March 31: Powerade JamFest
  - Three-Point Shoot-out
  - Timed Basketball Skills Competition
- Wednesday, April 1: 8th Annual Girls All-American Game

The Powerade JamFest is a skills-competition evening featuring basketball players who demonstrate their skills in two crowd-entertaining ways. Since the first All-American game in 2002, players have competed in a 3-point shooting challenge and a timed basketball skills competition.

=== Contest Winners ===
- The 2009 Timed Skills Competition contest was won by China Crosby.
- Skylar Diggins was winner of the 2009 3-point shoot-out.

== See also ==
- 2009 McDonald's All-American Boys Game
