= St. Michael Academy (New York City) =

Location
- 425 West 33rd Street; New York City (West Midtown, Manhattan), New York 10001; United States; 40°45′12″N 73°59′51″W

Information
- Type: Private, All-Female
- Religious affiliation: Catholic
- Established: 1874
- Status: Closed
- Closed: June 2010
- Sister school: Power Memorial Academy
- Grades: 9-12
- Student to teacher ratio: 20:1
- Colors: Red and White
- Team name: Eagles
- Accreditation: Middle States Association of Colleges and Schools
- Newspaper: Echoes

St. Michael Academy was an all-girls, private, Catholic high school in Manhattan in New York City. It is located within the Archdiocese of New York.

== Mission ==
Founded by the Presentation Sisters of Ireland, the mission had long been dedicated to educating young women in a loving and caring community, assisting each to develop her gifts and talents to live a fully Christian life.

== History ==
St. Michael Academy was founded in 1874 by the Sisters of the Blessed Virgin Mary, better known simply as the Presentation Sisters. They were initially invited to open an elementary school at Ninth Avenue, behind St. Paul the Apostle Church. It was initially a coeducational high school but became girls-only after World War II.

During the post-war era, the school mostly catered to professional-class Italian and Irish Catholic families. With the changing demographics of the area in the 21st century, most of the student population came from working-class families or were students rejected by other diocesan schools due to behavioral problems or poor academic performance. Despite this, 98 percent of graduates were accepted into college.

Beginning in 1980, the school's building was used by Elizabeth Seton College in Yonkers as a satellite campus, hosting the college's weekend classes. This relationship continued after the 1989 merger of Seton with Iona College.

In June 2010 the Archdiocese of New York announced the closure of two schools, including St. Michael Academy.

St. Michael Academy attracted students from all five boroughs of New York City, as well as Long Island and New Jersey. The largest concentration of students came from Manhattan.

== Curriculum ==
St. Michael Academy offered a college preparatory curriculum which exceeded the New York State Regent’s requirements. Students took English, Mathematics, Science, Language, Art and/or Music, History, Physical Education, Health, and Religion. Electives included Business, Law, Technology, Music, Spanish and Latin. The school also offered Advanced Placement courses in Spanish and English, and college level History courses through Mercy College.

== Extracurricular activities ==
St. Michael Academy had a variety of clubs and activities, including Poetry Club, National Honor Society, Honora Nagle Society, Prayer Group, Spanish Club, Movie Club, Global Community, Drum Circle, Newspaper, Yearbook, Step Team, World Dance, Ambassador’s Club, Book Club, Latin Club, Mad Scientists Club, and Student Council. There was also an annual trip abroad; in recent years, students had taken trips to Italy and Greece.

== Community service ==
St. Michael Academy recognized that its students and staff were members of a larger world family. Because of this, the school encouraged everyone to participate in service to the community. The following summarized opportunities available to students and staff to give back to the world that fed them.

Every student completed at least 25 hours of community service. Service could include documented hours inside or outside the school setting, such as working at a homeless shelter, or helping to host an alumnae event at the school. The requirement helped students practice helping others, including those in their immediate community.

Food Drive: Throughout the year, students and staff participated in a food drive for the hungry by bringing prepackaged food to the school for collection. Food was then delivered to a variety of food pantries and shelters, including the nearby homeless shelter, The Dwelling Place, at 39th Street and 10th Avenue, and The Little Sisters of Assumption Family Center in East Harlem.

Toy Drive: Each year in December, students and staff collected toys to distribute to needy families as Christmas presents for children. Students voted on the recipient agency. Last year, the toys were given to Target Stores for distribution.

College Fair: Each year, St. Michael Academy hosted a Catholic college fair at the school as a gift to the community. Admission was free, and students from Catholic schools across the city attended to learn about Catholic colleges across the country. This was the only college fair in the region that focused on Catholic higher education.

== Admissions and tuition ==
To be admitted to St. Michael Academy, you had to score at least 80 percent on the TACHS test or on a comparable exam administered by the school. Tuition for the 2009-2010 school year was $6,000.

== Alumnae ==
- Carmen Fariña, New York City Schools Chancellor 2014 - 2018
- Roma Maffia, American Actress
- Jennifer O'Neill, basketball player for WNBA and University of Kentucky
- Jenny Rivera, Associate Judge of the NY State Court of Appeals
- Kia Vaughn, basketball player for the WNBA
