= Destiny Williams =

American basketball player

Personal information
- Born: Benton Harbor, Michigan, U.S.
- Listed height: 6 ft 0 in (1.83 m)

Career information
- High school: Benton Harbor (Benton Harbor, Michigan)
- College: Illinois (2009–2010); Baylor (2010–2013)
- Position: Center

Career highlights
- NCAA champion (2013); Big 12 Sixth Player of the Year (2013); McDonald's All-American (2009)

Destiny Williams, also known as Cliffhanger, is an American basketball forward for the Baylor Lady Bears. Nationally ranked as the No. 8 senior according to ESPN HoopGurlz Williams attended the Nike Skills Regional Academy in 2007.

== Playing career ==
=== Baylor Lady Bears ===
Destiny transferred from Illinois and has enrolled at Baylor. Won a national championship with Baylor during the 2011–12 season.

=== Illinois Fighting Illini ===
==== 2009-10 ====
As a McDonald's All-America selection, she is the first Illinois signee ever to receive the honor. She also considered Maryland, Georgia and Louisville before choosing Illinois.

=== Team USA ===
She was named to the U.S. U19 National Team in the summer of 2009 and will compete with Team USA at the U19 World Championships July 23-Aug. 2 in Bangkok, Thailand

=== High school ===
As sophomore in 2006, she averaged 25.3 points, 14.9 rebounds, 3.5 assists, 2.3 steals. In her junior year, she had 24.5 points, 13.9 rebounds, 4.2 blocks and 3.7 as a junior and led her school to a 17–2 record. As a senior, she averaged 29.9 points, 16.1 rebounds, 6.2 assists and 4.5 blocks. Williams led Benton Harbor to the Class A state championship. On Saturday, March 21, Williams scored 19 of her game-leading 31 points in the first half as Benton Harbor routed Franklin 60–46 at Eastern Michigan University to win its first girls state championship.

Career at Baylor: Her junior season, she was a member of the Baylor Bears women national championship team during the 2011–12 season. Was 2nd on the team in rebounding with 9.1 a contest, third in scoring at 10.1 ppg. Earned the team's Rebounding Award. Selected to both the Final Four and Des Moines Regional All-Tournament teams. Earned honorable mention WBCA All-American honors. Named All-Big 12 second team and to the Big 12 Championship All-Tournament team.

== Player stats - Illinois and Baylor ==
Legend
GP	Games played	GS	Games started	MPG	Minutes per game
FG%	Field goal percentage	3P%	3-point field goal percentage	FT%	Free throw percentage
RPG	Rebounds per game	APG	Assists per game	SPG	Steals per game
BPG	Blocks per game	PPG	Points per game	**Bold**	Career high

Year	Team	GP	Points	FG%	3P%	FT%	RPG	APG	SPG	BPG	PPG
2009-10	Illinois	1	1	-	0.0%	50.0%	-	-	-	-	1.0
2010-11	Baylor	26	225	**54.5%**	0.0%	**68.9%**	7.1	0.6	0.5	**0.7**	8.7
2011-12	Baylor	**38**	**385**	54.5%	0.0%	65.5%	**9.1**	**1.2**	**0.9**	0.5	**10.1**
2012-13	Baylor	36	296	53.4%	**100.0%**	60.3%	6.6	0.7	0.8	0.4	8.2
Career		101	907	54.1%	100.0%	1.4%	0.2	0.9	0.8	0.5	9.0

== USA Basketball ==
Williams was named to the USA Women's U19 team which represented the US in the 2009 U19 World's Championship, held in Bangkok, Thailand in July and August 2009. Although the USA team lost the opening game to Spain, they went on to win their next seven games to earn a rematch against Spain in the finals, and won the game 81–71 to earn the gold medal. Williams scored 4.5 points per game.

== Awards and honors ==
- 2008-09 Gatorade Michigan Girls Basketball Player of the Year
- WBCA high school All-American
- Named 2008 Michigan Class A Player of the Year by the Associated Press (2007–08)
- All- State, Michigan Coaches Association, 2006
- First Team, All Conference, 2006
- All State, Associated Press, 2006
- MVP, Benton Harbor H.S., 2006
- First Team, Detroit News, 2006
- Honorable Mention, All-America, Street & Smith, 2006

All-State (AP and Coaches), All-Conference and All-City accolades ... Attended the Nike Skills Regional Academy in 2007 ... Plays for the Michigan Crossover AAU team along with fellow Illini signee Brianna Jones ...
