= Nadirah McKenith =

American basketball player (born 1991)

Personal information
- Born: September 6, 1991 (age 35) Newark, New Jersey, U.S.
- Listed height: 5 ft 7 in (1.70 m)
- Listed weight: 155 lb (70 kg)

Career information
- High school: University (Newark, New Jersey)
- College: St. John's (2009–2013)
- WNBA draft: 2013: 2nd round, 17th overall pick
- Drafted by: Washington Mystics
- Playing career: 2013–present
- Position: Guard

Career history
- 2013: Washington Mystics
- 2014: Minnesota Lynx

Career highlights
- First-team All-Big East (2013); Big East All-Freshman Team (2010)
- Stats at WNBA.com
- Stats at Basketball Reference

Nadirah A. McKenith (born September 6, 1991) is an American professional basketball player. She was drafted in 2013, by the Washington Mystics of the WNBA.

== Career ==
Born in Newark, New Jersey, McKenith played college basketball at St. John's, where she was an all-Big East point guard. Drafted with the 5th pick of the second round of the 2013 WNBA draft, McKenith made the Washington Mystics out of training camp, and played in 32 games for the Mystics during her rookie season.

She was signed by the Minnesota Lynx on June 24, 2014

== WNBA career statistics ==
Legend
GP	Games played	GS	Games started	MPG	Minutes per game	RPG	Rebounds per game
APG	Assists per game	SPG	Steals per game	BPG	Blocks per game	PPG	Points per game
TO	Turnovers per game	FG%	Field-goal percentage	3P%	3-point field-goal percentage	FT%	Free-throw percentage
**Bold**	Career best	°	League leader

=== Regular season ===
Year	Team	GP	GS	MPG	FG%	3P%	FT%	RPG	APG	SPG	BPG	TO	PPG
2013	Washington	**32**	0	**8.8**	**.372**	**.318**	.735	**1.1**	**1.0**	**0.6**	**0.1**	0.7	**2.8**
2014	Minnesota	6	0	4.0	.250	.000	**1.000**	0.7	0.2	0.2	0.0	0.2	0.7
Career	2 years, 2 teams	38	0	8.1	.366	.318	.750	1.1	0.9	0.5	0.1	0.6	2.5

=== Playoffs ===
Year	Team	GP	GS	MPG	FG%	3P%	FT%	RPG	APG	SPG	BPG	TO	PPG
2013	Washington	**3**	0	**8.7**	.000	.000	**1.000**	**1.3**	**1.3**	**0.7**	0.0	1.7	0.7
2014	Minnesota	2	0	1.0	.000	.000	**1.000**	0.0	0.5	0.0	0.0	0.0	**1.0**
Career	2 years, 2 teams	5	0	5.6	.000	.000	1.000	0.8	1.0	0.4	0.0	1.0	0.8

== St. John's statistics ==
Legend
GP	Games played	GS	Games started	MPG	Minutes per game
FG%	Field goal percentage	3P%	3-point field goal percentage	FT%	Free throw percentage
RPG	Rebounds per game	APG	Assists per game	SPG	Steals per game
BPG	Blocks per game	PPG	Points per game	**Bold**	Career high

Year	Team	GP	Points	FG%	3P%	FT%	RPG	APG	SPG	BPG	PPG
2009–10	St. John's	32	245	**47.8**	–	64.0	4.7	5.0	2.2	0.4	7.7
2010–11	St. John's	**33**	276	42.6	22.2	**80.0**	5.2	3.9	2.2	0.6	8.4
2011–12	St. John's	31	375	42.1	**27.9**	78.5	**5.7**	4.8	**2.3**	0.4	12.1
2012–13	St. John's	30	**397**	41.1	27.7	77.7	5.1	**5.5**	1.8	**1.0**	**13.2**
Career	St. John's	126	1293	42.9	25.6	75.4	5.2	4.8	2.1	0.6	10.3
