= 2013 WNBA playoffs =

Professional women's basketball tournament

- Dates: September 19 – October 10, 2013

Final positions
- Champions: Minnesota Lynx (Finals Champion)
- Runners-up: Atlanta Dream

Tournament statistics
- Attendance: 7,575 per game
- Scoring leader (s): Maya Moore (Minnesota) (20.9 PPG)

Awards
- MVP: Maya Moore (Minnesota)

The 2013 WNBA playoffs is the postseason for the Women's National Basketball Association's 2013 season. Four teams from each of the league's two conferences will qualify for the playoffs, seeded 1 to 4 in a tournament bracket, with the two opening rounds in a best-of-three format, and the final in a best-of-five format.

The Minnesota Lynx won the 2013 WNBA Finals, sweeping the Atlanta Dream in three games. The Lynx became the second WNBA team to sweep through the playoffs since the WNBA adopted the best-of-five format for the finals. The Lynx defeated the Phoenix Mercury in the Western Conference Finals, and the Seattle Storm in the conference semifinals. The Mercury had reached the Finals by defeating the Los Angeles Sparks in three games.

The Atlanta Dream won the Eastern Conference sweeping the defending WNBA champion Indiana Fever in two games. The Dream had defeated the Washington Mystics in the conference semifinals. The Fever had reached the Eastern Conference Finals by upsetting the top-seeded Chicago Sky.

The Lynx won their third straight Western Conference Championship and second WNBA title in three years. The Dream, meanwhile, failed to win a title despite making their third trip to the finals in four years.

== Tiebreak procedures ==
=== Two-team tie ===
1. Better record in head-to-head games.
2. Better winning percentage within own conference.
3. Better winning percentage against all teams with .500 or better record at the end of the season.
4. Better point differential in games head-to-head.
5. Coin toss.

=== Three or more-team tie ===
1. Better winning percentage among all head-to-head games involving tied teams.
2. Better winning percentage against teams within conference (for first two rounds of playoffs) or better record against teams in the opposite conference (for Finals).
3. Better winning percentage against all teams with a .500 or better record at the end of the season.
4. Better point differential in games involving tied teams.
5. Coin toss.

== Playoff qualifying ==
=== Eastern Conference ===
Seed	Team	W	L	Tiebreaker	Clinched	
Seed	Team	W	L	Tiebreaker	Playoff berth	Conference homecourt
1	Chicago Sky	24	10		August 23	August 31
2	Atlanta Dream	17	17	3-2 vs. WAS	September 4	
3	Washington Mystics	17	17	2-3 vs. ATL	September 10	
4	Indiana Fever	16	18		September 7	

=== Western Conference ===
Seed	Team	W	L	Tiebreaker	Clinched		
Seed	Team	W	L	Tiebreaker	Playoff berth	Conference homecourt	League homecourt
1	Minnesota Lynx	26	8		August 22	September 10	September 14
2	Los Angeles Sparks	24	10		August 23		
3	Phoenix Mercury	19	15		September 6		
4	Seattle Storm	17	17		August 31		

== Bracket ==
**Conference semifinals** Best-of-3
E1	Chicago	0
E4	**Indiana**	**2**
Eastern Conference
E2	**Atlanta**	**2**
E3	Washington	1
W1	**Minnesota**	**2**
W4	Seattle	0
Western Conference
W2	Los Angeles	1
W3	**Phoenix**	**2**

**Conference finals** Best-of-3
E4	Indiana	0
E2	**Atlanta**	**2**
W1	**Minnesota**	**2**
W3	Phoenix	0

**WNBA Finals**; Best-of-5
E2	Atlanta	0
W1	**Minnesota**	**3**

- **Bold** – Series winner
- Italics – Team with home-court advantage

== Eastern Conference ==
=== Conference semifinals ===
==== (1) Chicago Sky vs. (4) Indiana Fever ====
NBA TV

September 20
7:00 pm

Boxscore

**Indiana Fever** **85**, Chicago Sky 72
Scoring by quarter: **25**–22, **25**–15, **22**–21, 13–**14**
Pts: Shavonte Zellous 20; Rebs: Erlana Larkins 11; Asts: Briann January 6	Pts: Elena Delle Donne 20; Rebs: Sylvia Fowles 10; Asts: Courtney Vandersloot 7

Allstate Arena, Rosemont, IL
Attendance: 5,895
Referees: Maj Forsberg, Roy Gulbeyan, Byron Jarrett

ESPN2

September 22
3:00 pm

Boxscore

Chicago Sky 57, **Indiana Fever** **79**
Scoring by quarter: 14–**22**, 13–**25**, 16–**20**, **14**–12
Pts: Sylvia Fowles 14; Rebs: Sylvia Fowles 14; Asts: Vandersloot and Delle Donne 2	Pts: Tamika Catchings 18; Rebs: Tamika Catchings 12; Asts: Briann January 4
**Indiana wins series, 2–0**

Bankers Life Fieldhouse, Indianapolis, IN
Attendance: 7144
Referees: Lamont Simpson, Cameron Inouye, Tony Dawkins

Regular-season series

Indiana won the regular-season series 3–1:

June 22, 2013

Report

**Chicago Sky 71**, Indiana Fever 61

Bankers Life Fieldhouse, Indianapolis, IN

August 3, 2013

Report

Chicago Sky 58, **Indiana Fever 79**

Bankers Life Fieldhouse, Indianapolis, IN

August 6, 2013

Report

**Indiana Fever 64**, Chicago Sky 58

Allstate Arena, Rosemont, IL

September 6, 2013

Report

**Indiana Fever 82**, Chicago Sky 77

Allstate Arena, Rosemont, IL

==== (2) Atlanta Dream vs. (3) Washington Mystics ====
ESPN2

September 19
8:00 pm

Boxscore

**Washington Mystics** **71**, Atlanta Dream 56
Scoring by quarter: **16**–12, **15**–12, **26**–13, 14–**19**
Pts: Ivory Latta 14; Rebs: Crystal Langhorne 15; Asts: Ivory Latta 7	Pts: Angel McCoughtry 20; Rebs: Erika de Souza 12; Asts: Angel McCoughtry 3

Philips Arena, Atlanta, GA
Attendance: 3,862
Referees: Eric Brewton, Brenda Pantoja, Tom Mauer

NBA TV

September 21
7:00 pm

Boxscore

**Atlanta Dream** **63**, Washington Mystics 45
Scoring by quarter: **17**–9, **19**–12, 10–**15**, **17**–9
Pts: Angel McCoughtry 20; Rebs: Erika de Souza 15; Asts: Jasmine Thomas 6	Pts: Tayler Hill 11; Rebs: Vaughn, Snow 6 Asts: Nadirah McKenith 3

Verizon Center, Washington, D.C.
Attendance: 7,065
Referees: Kurt Walker, Lauren Holtkamp, Billy Smith

NBA TV

September 23
8:00 pm

Boxscore

Washington Mystics 72, **Atlanta Dream** **80**
Scoring by quarter: **22**–20, 19, 14, 17–**27**
Pts: Monique Currie 22; Rebs: Crystal Langhorne 6 Asts: Matee Ajavon 5	Pts: de Souza, Hayes 18; Rebs: Erika de Souza 14; Asts: Angel McCoughtry 7
**Atlanta wins series, 2–1**

Philips Arena, Atlanta, GA
Attendance: 4,078
Referees: Daryl Humphrey, Sue Blauch, Thomas Nunez

Regular-season series

Atlanta won the regular season series 3–2:

June 2, 2013

Report

**Atlanta Dream 73**, Washington Mystics 63

Verizon Center, Washington, D.C.

June 28, 2013

Report

Washington Mystics 75, **Atlanta Dream 86**

Philips Arena, Atlanta, GA

August 18, 2013

Report

Washington Mystics 58, **Atlanta Dream 76**

Philips Arena, Atlanta, GA

August 23, 2013

Report

Atlanta Dream 64, **Washington Mystics 74**

Verizon Center, Washington, D.C.

August 28, 2013

Report

**Washington Mystics 85**, Atlanta Dream 76

Philips Arena, Atlanta, GA

=== Conference finals ===
==== (2) Atlanta Dream vs. (4) Indiana Fever ====
ESPN2

September 26
7:00 pm

Boxscore

Indiana Fever 79, **Atlanta Dream** **84**
Scoring by quarter: 26–**27**, 14–**15**, 16–**20**, **23**–22
Pts: Tamika Catchings 21; Rebs: Erlana Larkins 12; Asts: Christmas, Clarendon 4	Pts: Tiffany Hayes 23; Rebs: Armintie Herrington 7 Asts: Herrington, McCoughtry 5

Philips Arena, Atlanta, GA
Attendance: 4238
Referees: Cameron Inouye, Eric Brewton, Maj Forsberg

ESPN2

September 29
4:00pm ET

Boxscore

**Atlanta Dream** **67**, Indiana Fever 53
Scoring by quarter: 19-19, **15**-14, **18**-9, **17**-11
Pts: Angel McCoughtry 27; Rebs: Armintie Herrington 9 Asts: Angel McCoughtry 3	Pts: Tamika Catchings 24; Rebs: Erlana Larkins 7 Asts: Shavonte Zellous
**Atlanta wins series, 2–0**

Bankers Life Fieldhouse, Indianapolis, IN
Attendance: 7051
Referees: Lamont Simpson, Roy Gulbeyan, Brenda Pantoja

Regular-season series

Atlanta won the regular season series 3–1:

May 31, 2013

Report

**Atlanta Dream 86**, Indiana Fever 77

Bankers Life Fieldhouse, Indianapolis, IN

June 25, 2013

Report

Indiana Fever 60, **Atlanta Dream 76**

Philips Arena, Atlanta, GA

August 10, 2013

Report

Atlanta Dream 66, **Indiana Fever 80**

Bankers Life Fieldhouse, Indianapolis, IN

August 28, 2013

Report

Indiana Fever 80, **Atlanta Dream 89 (OT)**

Philips Arena, Atlanta, GA

== Western Conference ==
=== Conference semifinals ===
==== (1) Minnesota Lynx vs. (4) Seattle Storm ====
NBA TV

September 20
9:00pm ET

Boxscore

Seattle Storm 64, **Minnesota Lynx** **80**
Scoring by quarter: 15-**16**, 21-**24**, 12-**22**, 16-**18**
Pts: Temeka Johnson 14; Rebs: Tina Thompson 8 Asts: Johnson and T. Wright 4	Pts: Seimone Augustus 19; Rebs: Rebekkah Brunson 9 Asts: Maya Moore 6

Target Center, Minneapolis, MN
Attendance: 8,832
Referees: Sue Blauch, Tony Dawkins, Thomas Nunez

ESPN2

September 22
5:00pm ET

Boxscore

**Minnesota Lynx** **58**, Seattle Storm 55
Scoring by quarter: **20**-16, 8-**12**, **14**-11, 16-16
Pts: Maya Moore 22; Rebs: Rebekkah Brunson 13; Asts: Janel McCarville 5	Pts: Tanisha Wright 16; Rebs: Clark and Thompson 9 Asts: Johnson, Stricklen and Wright 2
**Minnesota wins series, 2–0**

Tacoma Dome, Tacoma, WA
Attendance: 3,457
Referees: Maj Forsberg, Roy Gulbeyan, Eric Brewton

Regular-season series

Minnesota won the regular season series 4–0:

August 4, 2013

Report

Seattle Storm 72, **Minnesota Lynx 90**

Target Center, Minneapolis, MN

August 31, 2013

Report

Seattle Storm 74, **Minnesota Lynx 97**

Target Center, Minneapolis, MN

September 7, 2013

Report

**Minnesota Lynx 75**, Seattle Storm 60

Key Arena, Seattle, WA

September 10, 2013

Report

**Minnesota Lynx 73**, Seattle Storm 60

Key Arena, Seattle, WA

==== (2) Los Angeles Sparks vs. (3) Phoenix Mercury ====
ESPN2

September 19
10:00 pm

Boxscore

**Phoenix Mercury** **86**, Los Angeles Sparks 75
Scoring by quarter: 20–**26**, **18**–17, **27**–17, **21**–15
Pts: Diana Taurasi 30; Rebs: Candice Dupree 7 Asts: Diana Taurasi 7	Pts: Candace Parker 28; Rebs: Nneka Ogwumike 14; Asts: Lindsey Harding 5

Staples Center, Los Angeles, CA
Attendance: 8,500
Referees: Lamont Simpson, Kurt Walker, Cameron Inouye

NBA TV

September 21
10:00 pm

Boxscore

**Los Angeles Sparks** **82**, Phoenix Mercury 73
Scoring by quarter: **17**–13, **27**–17, 21–**25**, 17–**18**
Pts: Candace Parker 31; Rebs: Ogwumike, Parker 11; Asts: Lindsey Harding 4	Pts: Diana Taurasi 20; Rebs: Candice Dupree 9 Asts: Diana Taurasi 5

US Airways Center, Phoenix, AZ
Attendance: 11,110
Referees: Daryl Humphrey, Michael Price, Brenda Pantoja

ESPN2

September 23
10:00 pm

Boxscore

**Phoenix Mercury** **78**, Los Angeles Sparks 77
Scoring by quarter: 19–19, **23**–21, 24–24, 12–**13**
Pts: Candice Dupree 22; Rebs: Bonner, Gilbreath 6 Asts: Diana Taurasi 10	Pts: Kristi Toliver 22; Rebs: Nneka Ogwumike 10; Asts: Toliver, Coleman 3
**Phoenix wins series, 2–1**

Staples Center, Los Angeles, CA
Attendance: 9,321
Referees: Tom Mauer, Eric Brewton, Maj Forsberg

Regular-season series

Regular season series tied 2-2:

June 14, 2013

Report

L.A. Sparks 81, **Phoenix Mercury 97**

US Airways Center, Phoenix, AZ

July 14, 2013

Report

**L.A. Sparks 88**, Phoenix Mercury 76

US Airways Center, Phoenix, AZ

July 18, 2013

Report

**Phoenix Mercury 90**, L.A. Sparks 84

Staples Center, Los Angeles, CA

September 15, 2013

Report

Phoenix Mercury 55, **L.A. Sparks 89**

Staples Center, Los Angeles, CA

=== Conference finals ===
==== (1) Minnesota Lynx vs. (3) Phoenix Mercury ====
ESPN2

September 26
9:00pm ET

Boxscore

Phoenix Mercury 62, **Minnesota Lynx** **85**
Scoring by quarter: 16-**24**, 6-**21**, 20-**22**, **20**-18
Pts: Diana Taurasi 15; Rebs: Brittney Griner 6 Asts: Bonner and Dupree 3	Pts: M. Moore and Whalen 20; Rebs: Lindsay Whalen 6 Asts: Lindsay Whalen 5

Target Center, Minneapolis, MN
Attendance: 9013
Referees: Daryl Humphrey, Sue Blauch, Tom Mauer

ESPN2

September 29
5:00pm ET

Boxscore

**Minnesota Lynx** **72**, Phoenix Mercury 65
Scoring by quarter: 19-**21**, **19**-14, **15**-10, 19-**20**
Pts: Maya Moore 27; Rebs: Rebekkah Brunson 14; Asts: Lindsay Whalen 7	Pts: Diana Taurasi 21; Rebs: Brittney Griner 10; Asts: Diana Taurasi 6
**Minnesota wins series, 2–0**

US Airways Center, Phoenix, AZ
Attendance: 8020
Referees: Michael Price, Denise Brooks, Kurt Walker

Regular-season series

Minnesota won the regular-season series 5-0:

June 6, 2013

Report

Phoenix Mercury 79, **Minnesota Lynx 99**

Target Center, Minneapolis, MN

June 19, 2013

Report

**Minnesota Lynx 80**, Phoenix Mercury 69

US Airways Center, Phoenix, AZ

July 7, 2013

Report

Phoenix Mercury 59, **Minnesota Lynx 91**

Target Center, Minneapolis, MN

July 21, 2013

Report

**Minnesota Lynx 82**, Phoenix Mercury 77

US Airways Center, Phoenix, AZ

July 24, 2013

Report

Phoenix Mercury 69, **Minnesota Lynx 81**

Target Center, Minneapolis, MN

== WNBA Finals ==
=== Minnesota Lynx vs. Atlanta Dream ===
ESPN

October 6
8:30pm ET

Boxscore

Atlanta Dream 59, **Minnesota Lynx** **84**
Scoring by quarter: 16-**24**, 9-**20**, 18-**24**, 16-16
Pts: Angel McCoughtry 17; Rebs: Aneika Henry 14; Asts: Armintie Herrington 3	Pts: Maya Moore 23; Rebs: Rebekkah Brunson 8 Asts: Lindsay Whalen 5

Target Center, Minneapolis, MN
Attendance: 13,804
Referees: Michael Price, Cameron Inouye, Kurt Walker

ESPN2

October 8
8:00pm ET

Boxscore

Atlanta Dream 63, **Minnesota Lynx** **88**
Scoring by quarter: 16-**27**, 20-**24**, 16-**17**, 11-**20**
Pts: Angel McCoughtry 15; Rebs: Aneika Henry 6 Asts: Angel McCoughtry 4	Pts: Seimone Augustus 20; Rebs: Rebekkah Brunson 10; Asts: Lindsay Whalen 5

Target Center, Minneapolis, MN
Attendance: 12,313
Referees: Eric Brewton, Sue Blauch, Daryl Humphrey

ESPN2

October 10
8:30pm ET

Boxscore

**Minnesota Lynx** **86**, Atlanta Dream 77
Scoring by quarter: **25**-17, 15-**20**, **26**-19, 20-**21**
Pts: Maya Moore 23; Rebs: Rebekkah Brunson 12; Asts: Lindsay Whalen 6	Pts: Tiffany Hayes 20; Rebs: Érika de Souza 9 Asts: Alex Bentley 6
**Minnesota Wins Series 3-0**

Arena at Gwinnett Center, Duluth, GA
Attendance: 5,040
Referees: Lamont Simpson, Denise Brooks, Brenda Pantoja

Regular Season Series

The season series was tied, 1-1:

July 9, 2013

Report

Atlanta Dream 72, **Minnesota Lynx** **94**

Target Center, Minneapolis, MN

August 20, 2013

Report

Minnesota Lynx 75, **Atlanta Dream 88**

Philips Arena, Atlanta, GA
