= Kia Vaughn =

American-born Czech basketball player (born 1987)

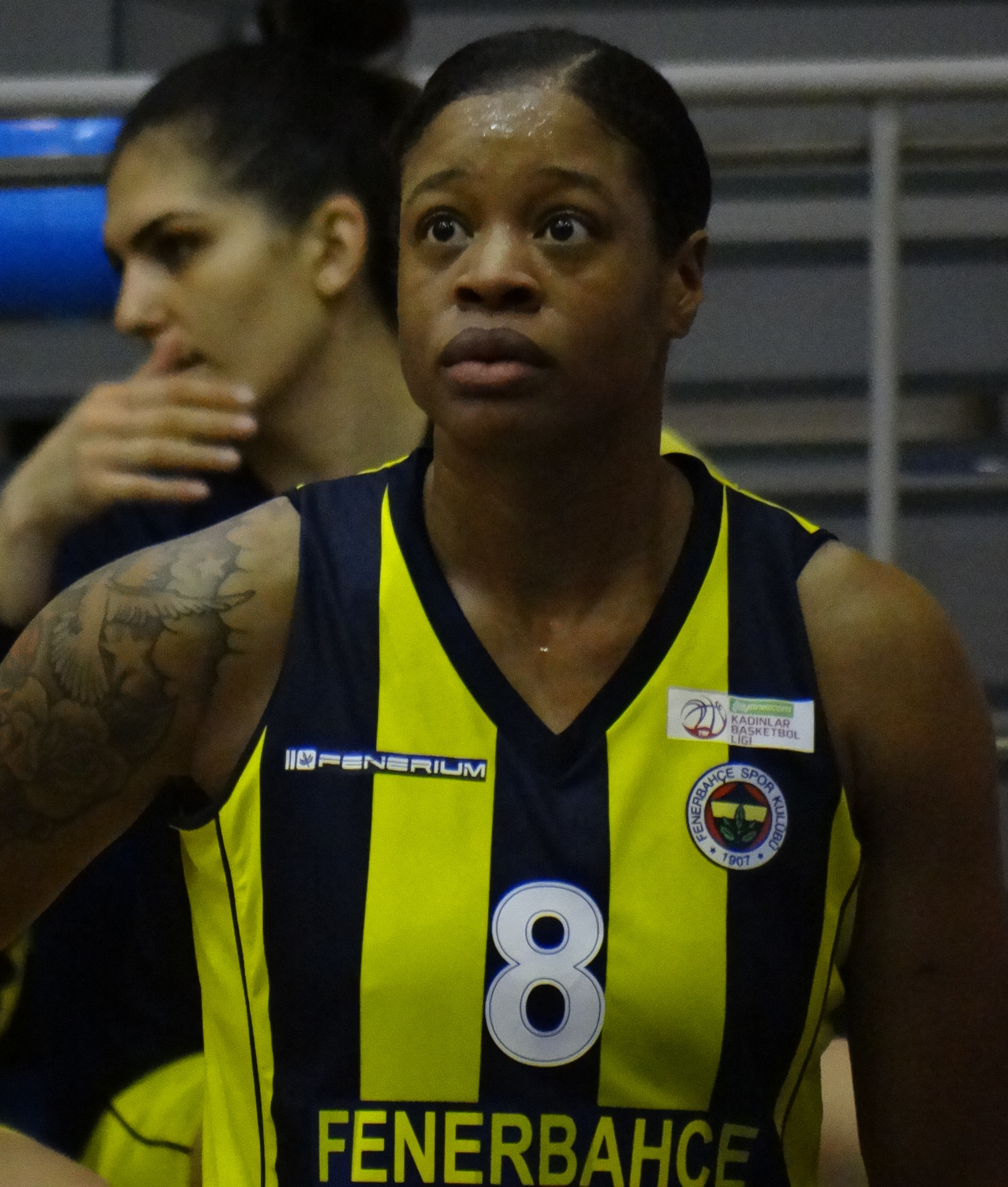

Personal information
- Born: January 24, 1987 (age 39) Bronx, New York, U.S.
- Listed height: 6 ft 4 in (1.93 m)
- Listed weight: 205 lb (93 kg)

Career information
- High school: St. Michael Academy (New York City, New York)
- College: Rutgers (2005–2009)
- WNBA draft: 2009: 1st round, 8th overall pick
- Drafted by: New York Liberty
- Playing career: 2009–2022
- Position: Center
- Number: 7

Career history
- 2009–2012: New York Liberty
- 2009–2010: Ramat Hasharon
- 2011: Elitzur Ramla
- 2011–2012: Taranto Cras Basket
- 2012–2017: USK Praha
- 2013–2016: Washington Mystics
- 2017–2018: New York Liberty
- 2017–2019: Fenerbahçe Istanbul
- 2019–2020: Elazığ İl Özel İdarespor
- 2020–2021: Phoenix Mercury
- 2022: Atlanta Dream

Career highlights
- Turkish Cup winner (2019); WNBA Most Improved Player (2011); 3× Czech National League champion (2013–2015); Europe SuperCup winner (2015); EuroLeague champion (2015); 3× Turkish Super League champion (2018, 2019, 2021); Czech Basketball Cup winner (2014); First-team All-Big East (2007); McDonald's All-American (2005)
- Stats at WNBA.com
- Stats at Basketball Reference
Medals
Women's basketball
Representing the United States
FIBA Under-20 World Cup
Gold medal – first place	2006 Mexico	Team

Kia Vaughn (born January 24, 1987) is an American-born former professional basketball player. She last played for the Atlanta Dream of the Women's National Basketball Association (WNBA) She attended high school at St. Michael's All Girls High School in New York, and later went on to star at Rutgers University.

== High school ==
Born in the Bronx, New York, Vaughn played for St. Michael Academy in New York City, where she was named a WBCA All-American. Her father Linzell "Predator" Vaughn is a noted street ball player at Rucker Park. She participated in the 2005 WBCA High School All-America Game where she scored two points.

== College ==
Vaughn attended Rutgers University from 2006 to 2009, playing under legendary coach C. Vivian Stringer. She helped Rutgers to a perfect 16–0 record in the Big East conference her freshman year, averaging 6.3 points per game and 7 rebounds a game. During her sophomore season, she was named the All-Met Division I Women's College Basketball Player of the Year. She averaged 12.8 points per game, 9.3 rebounds per game, and 2.5 blocks per game. That year, she helped lead the Rutgers women's basketball team to a Big East Conference championship. The Lady Scarlet Knights lost to the Tennessee Lady Vols in the NCAA championship game.

Vaughn continued to excel in her junior season, garnering Metropolitan Basketball Writers Association All-Met First Team honors along with being named to the All Big-East second team. She averaged 10 points per game and 8.2 rebounds per game on the season. Her senior campaign was solid, but a little underwhelming as she averaged only 9.7 points per game 6.7 rebounds per game. Nevertheless, she was named All-Big East Honorable Mention at the season's conclusion.

== Rutgers statistics ==
Legend
GP	Games played	GS	Games started	MPG	Minutes per game
FG%	Field goal percentage	3P%	3-point field goal percentage	FT%	Free throw percentage
RPG	Rebounds per game	APG	Assists per game	SPG	Steals per game
BPG	Blocks per game	PPG	Points per game	**Bold**	Career high

Year	Team	GP	Points	FG%	3P%	FT%	RPG	APG	SPG	BPG	PPG
2005-06	Rutgers	32	200	53.6	-	53.5	7.0	0.2	0.6	2.1	6.3
2006-07	Rutgers	**36**	**462**	55.7	**100.0**	**67.8**	**9.3**	0.6	1.1	**2.6**	**12.8**
2007-08	Rutgers	34	339	54.9	-	47.5	8.3	0.8	0.9	1.7	10.0
2008-09	Rutgers	33	328	**58.5**	-	44.1	7.2	0.8	1.1	1.9	9.9
Career	Rutgers	135	1329	55.9	100.0	55.9	8.0	0.6	0.9	2.1	9.8

== USA Basketball ==
Vaughn was also a member of the Championship winning 2006 USA National Team FIBA Americas U20 Championship for Women in Mexico City, Mexico. Kia averaged 12 points and 3 rebounds in 5 games.

== Professional career ==
=== WNBA ===
Vaughn was drafted 8th overall in the 2009 WNBA draft by her home state team, the New York Liberty. In her first two seasons with the Liberty, she was a reserve on the team's roster. In her third season with the Liberty, she was the starting center for the team and averaged career-highs in scoring and rebounding. For these efforts, she would win the 2011 WNBA Most Improved Player Award. In her fourth season with the Liberty, Vaughn became a role player on the roster, playing 31 games with 17 starts. Upon the 2013 season, Vaughn was a restricted free agent and was traded to the Washington Mystics along with a 2013 first round pick in exchange for the seventh overall pick in the 2013 WNBA draft.

In her first season with the Mystics, she was a role player on the roster and then would be upgraded in the Mystics' starting lineup the following year at the five spot. In 2015, Vaughn would have an injury-riddled season, she missed the first half of the season due to a concussion, she made her return in the beginning of August and played 20 games. In the 2016 season, Vaughn would be fully healthy, playing all 34 games with 4 starts. In January 2017, the New York Liberty re-acquired Vaughan in a three-team trade deal that sent teammate Bria Hartley also to the Liberty, Carolyn Swords along with the 15th overall pick in the 2017 WNBA draft to the Seattle Storm and the Mystics receiving two 2017 first round draft picks from the Storm.

In February 2018, Vaughn re-signed with the Liberty.

Vaughn did not play in the 2019 WNBA season, choosing to focus on her season in Turkey.

Vaughn signed with the Phoenix Mercury for the 2020 season. She would re-sign with the team in 2021.

On August 14, 2022, Vaughn announced her retirement.

=== Overseas ===
From 2012 to 2015, Vaughn played three off-seasons in Czech Republic for ZVVZ USK Praha. In August 2016, Vaughn re-signed with ZVVZ USK Praha for the 2016-17 WNBA off-season In September 2017, Vaughn signed with Fenerbahçe Istanbul of the Turkish Super League for the 2017-18 off-season.

== WNBA career statistics ==
Legend
GP	Games played	GS	Games started	MPG	Minutes per game	RPG	Rebounds per game
APG	Assists per game	SPG	Steals per game	BPG	Blocks per game	PPG	Points per game
TO	Turnovers per game	FG%	Field-goal percentage	3P%	3-point field-goal percentage	FT%	Free-throw percentage
**Bold**	Career best	°	League leader

=== Regular season ===
Year	Team	GP	GS	MPG	FG%	3P%	FT%	RPG	APG	SPG	BPG	TO	PPG
2009	New York	**34**	1	11.6	.493	.000	.500	2.6	0.2	0.2	0.1	0.9	4.8
2010	New York	30	0	8.1	.348	**1.000**	.650	1.4	0.3	0.2	0.2	**0.6**	2.1
2011	New York	**34**	**34**	**28.1**	.497	.000	**.786**	**6.7**	1.1	**1.2**	0.7	1.8	**10.1**
2012	New York	31	17	22.9	.430	.000	.656	5.0	0.9	0.5	0.8	1.0	6.5
2013	Washington	**34**	15	20.0	.425	.000	.761	5.2	0.6	0.7	**1.1**	1.5	6.9
2014	Washington	33	33	24.1	.458	.000	.634	6.3	1.2	0.9	0.5	1.4	9.0
2015	Washington	20	1	17.8	.451	.000	.667	4.2	1.0	0.4	0.4	1.3	5.7
2016	Washington	**34**	4	19.8	.503	.000	.750	4.3	0.6	0.6	0.5	0.9	6.3
2017	New York	28	22	19.6	**.536**	.000	.583	4.9	0.7	0.4	0.4	0.8	5.8
2018	New York	29	27	18.3	.533	.000	.643	4.0	0.7	0.7	0.2	1.0	5.7
2020	Phoenix	22	10	18.9	.488	.000	.579	3.6	**1.5**	0.5	0.3	1.5	6.1
2021	Phoenix	28	2	15.8	.444	.000	.600	2.7	1.3	0.2	0.2	1.3	4.6
2022	Atlanta	29	1	13.8	.400	.000	.692	3.2	0.9	0.3	0.3	1.1	2.5
Career	13 years, 4 teams	386	167	18.5	.468	.100	.668	4.2	0.8	0.5	0.5	1.2	5.9

=== Playoffs ===
Year	Team	GP	GS	MPG	FG%	3P%	FT%	RPG	APG	SPG	BPG	TO	PPG
2010	New York	5	0	15.6	**.625**	.000	.462	3.0	0.6	0.0	0.6	1.0	5.2
2011	New York	3	**3**	26.0	.571	.000	.900	6.3	**1.3**	**1.0**	0.3	1.0	8.3
2012	New York	2	0	22.5	.417	.000	**1.000**	**8.5**	1.0	0.0	0.5	1.5	5.5
2013	Washington	3	**3**	24.7	.462	.000	.000	5.0	0.7	0.7	**0.7**	1.3	8.0
2014	Washington	2	2	23.0	.300	.000	.500	5.0	0.5	0.5	0.0	2.0	3.5
2015	Washington	3	0	16.7	.538	.000	.833	4.3	0.3	0.0	0.0	**0.7**	6.3
2017	New York	1	1	15.0	.000	.000	.000	5.0	0.0	0.0	0.0	2.0	0.0
2020	Phoenix	2	2	**31.5**	.478	.000	.000	6.0	0.5	0.0	0.0	1.0	**11.0**
2021	Phoenix	**11**	0	12.8	.288	.000	**1.000**	2.2	1.2	0.4	0.0	1.1	2.9
Career	9 years, 3 teams	32	11	18.4	.423	.000	.706	4.1	0.8	0.3	0.2	1.2	5.2

== Litigation ==
On August 14, 2007 Vaughn, one of the women involved in the controversial remarks made earlier that year by Don Imus and his producer Bernard McGuirk, filed suit against Imus, McGuirk, NBC Universal, CBS Corporation, MSNBC, CBS Radio, Viacom, Westwood One radio, citing slander, libel, and defamation of character. Vaughn was the only player to pursue legal damages brought on by the controversy. Vaughn dropped the lawsuit against Imus on September 11, 2007, citing her desire to "concentrate on her studies and basketball training."
