= 2013 Connecticut Sun season =

- Coach: Anne Donovan
- Arena: Mohegan Sun Arena
- Attendance: per game

Results
- Record: 10–24 (.294)
- Place: 6th (Eastern)
- Playoff finish: DNQ

Media
- Television: CSN-NE; ESPN2, NBATV

The 2013 WNBA season was the 15th season for the Connecticut Sun franchise in the Women's National Basketball Association, and their 11th since moving to Connecticut from Orlando.

== Transactions ==
=== WNBA draft ===
The following are the Dream's selections in the 2013 WNBA draft.

Round	Pick	Player	Nationality	School/team/country
1	11			
2	23			
3	35			

=== Trades ===
Date	Trade	
TBD	To Connecticut Sun	To TBD
TBD	TBD	TBD

=== Personnel changes ===
==== Additions ====
Player	Signed	Former team

==== Subtractions ====
Player	Left	New team

== Roster ==
2013 Connecticut Sun roster
Players
Coaches

Pos.	No.	Nat.	Name	Height	Weight	DOB	From	Yrs
F	8	(United States)	Bass, Mistie	6' 4" (1.93m)	190 lb (86kg)	1983-12-02	Duke	5
C	31	(United States)	Charles, Tina	6' 4" (1.93m)	198 lb (90kg)	1988-12-05	Connecticut	2
G	34	(United States)	Faris, Kelly	5' 11" (1.8m)		1991-01-16	Connecticut	R
G	32	(United States)	Greene, Kalana	5' 10" (1.78m)	170 lb (77kg)	1987-07-13	Connecticut	2
F	5	(United States)	Griffin, Kelsey	6' 2" (1.88m)	179 lb (81kg)	1987-07-02	Nebraska	2
G	23	(United States)	Hightower, Allison	5' 10" (1.78m)	139 lb (63kg)	1988-04-06	LSU	2
G/F	88	(Brazil)	Castro Marques, Iziane	6' 0" (1.83m)	140 lb (64kg)	1982-03-13	Brazil	10
G	20	(United States)	Lawson, Kara	5' 9" (1.75m)	155 lb (70kg)	1981-02-14	Tennessee	9
G	21	(United States)	Montgomery, Renee	5' 7" (1.7m)	143 lb (65kg)	1986-12-02	Connecticut	3
G	1	(United States)	Carter, Sydney	5' 6" (1.68m)		1990-11-01	Texas A&M	1
G/F	14	(United States)	White, Tan	5' 7" (1.7m)	154 lb (70kg)	1982-09-27	Mississippi State	7
F	7	(United States)	Pedersen, Kayla	6' 4" (1.93m)	190 lb (86kg)	1989-04-14	Stanford	2

Head coach
(United States) Anne Donovan (Old Dominion)
Assistant coaches
(United States) Jennifer Gillom (Mississippi)
(United States) Catherine Proto (Springfield)
Athletic trainer
(United States) Jeremy Norman (Keene State)
Strength and conditioning coach
(United States) Jodi Hopkins (Ohio)

Legend

- (C) Team captain
- (DP) Unsigned draft pick
- (FA) Free agent
- (S) Suspended
- Injured

=== Depth ===
Pos.	Starter	Bench
C	Tina Charles	Ashley Walker
PF	Kelsey Griffin	Mistie Bass
SF	Kalana Greene	Tan White; Kelly Faris
SG	Allison Hightower	Renee Montgomery
PG	Kara Lawson	Sydney Carter

== Season standings ==
#	Eastern Conference					
#	Team	W	L	PCT	GB	GP
1	z-Chicago Sky	24	10	.706	-	34
2	x-Atlanta Dream	17	17	.500	7	34
3	x-Washington Mystics	17	17	.500	7	34
4	x-Indiana Fever	16	18	.471	8	34
5	e-New York Liberty	11	23	.324	13	34
6	e-Connecticut Sun	10	24	.294	14	34

== Schedule ==
=== Preseason ===
2013 pre-season game log
Total: 2–1 (Home: 1–0; Road: 1–1)
Pre-season: 2–1 (Home: 1–0; Road: 1–1)

Game	Date	Team	Score	High points	High rebounds	High assists	Location Attendance	Record
1	May 11	NY Liberty	W 83–74	Allison Hightower (12)	Natasha Lacy (5)	Kara Lawson (4)	Mohegan Sun Arena; 6692	1–0
2	May 18	@ NY Liberty	L 67–78	Ashley Walker (12)	Natasha Lacy (7)	Lawson & Lacy (3)	Prudential Center; 1945	1–1
3	May 21	@ Minnesota	W 88–80	Tan White (12)	Ashley Walker (10)	Kara Lawson (6)	Target Center; 2803	2–1

2013 season schedule

=== Regular season ===
2013 game log
Total: 10–24 (Home: 8–9; Road: 2–15)
May: 1–1 (Home: 1–0; Road: 0–1)

Game	Date	Team	Score	High points	High rebounds	High assists	Location Attendance	Record
1	May 25	NY Liberty	W 81–69	Kara Lawson (23)	Tina Charles (13)	Kara Lawson (5)	Mohegan Sun Arena; 7672	1–0
2	May 31	@ Chicago	L 75–86	Allison Hightower (20)	Tina Charles (15)	Kara Lawson (4)	Allstate Arena; 6607	1–1

June : 1–6 (Home: 0–4; Road: 1–2)

Game	Date	Team	Score	High points	High rebounds	High assists	Location Attendance	Record
3	June 1	@ Minnesota	L 74–90	Charles & Lawson (22)	Tina Charles (10)	Hightower & Lawson (4)	Target Center; 9223	1–2
4	June 7	Washington	L 62–66	Tina Charles (21)	Tina Charles (12)	Allison Hightower (5)	Mohegan Sun Arena; 6150	1–3
5	June 12	@ Indiana	W 73–61	Tina Charles (30)	Tina Charles (10)	Kalana Greene (5)	Bankers Life Fieldhouse; 6283	2–3
6	June 14	@ NY Liberty	L 68–78	Allison Hightower (17)	Griffin & Bass (8)	Kara Lawson (6)	Prudential Center; 5845	2–4
7	June 16	Seattle	L 66–78	Allison Hightower (17)	Griffin & Charles (6)	Hightower, Lawson, Bass, & Castro Marques (2)	Mohegan Sun Arena; 6550	2–5
8	June 23	Atlanta	L 77–78	Tina Charles (19)	Tina Charles (12)	Allison Hightower (5)	Mohegan Sun Arena; 7557	2–6
9	June 29	Phoenix	L 70–89	Tina Charles (25)	Tina Charles (13)	Greene & Carter (2)	Mohegan Sun Arena; 9110	2–7

July : 2–5 (Home: 2–1; Road: 0–4)

Game	Date	Team	Score	High points	High rebounds	High assists	Location Attendance	Record
10	July 2	Tulsa	W 88–69	Allison Hightower (18)	Tina Charles (13)	Sydney Carter (8)	Mohegan Sun Arena; 5701	3–7
11	July 6	@ Indiana	L 66–78	Griffin & Hightower (17)	Kelsey Griffin (8)	Iziane Castro Marques (3)	Bankers Life Fieldhouse; 6383	3–8
12	July 12	Chicago	L 70–83	Tina Charles (29)	Greene & Castro Marques (7)	Kara Lawson (5)	Mohegan Sun Arena; 6285	3–9
13	July 14	San Antonio	W 86–84	Allison Hightower (23)	Tina Charles (10)	Kara Lawson (6)	Mohegan Sun Arena; 6335	4–9
14	July 19	@ Tulsa	L 58–64	Allison Hightower (14)	Tina Charles (12)	Tan White (3)	BOK Center; 5294	4–10
15	July 20	@ San Antonio	L 52–60	Tina Charles (18)	Tina Charles (12)	Tan White (3)	AT&T Center; 8375	4–11
16	July 24	@ Atlanta	L 65–74	Greene & Charles (14)	Tina Charles (16)	Mistie Bass (3)	Philips Arena; 4434	4–12

August : 3–10 (Home: 2–4; Road: 1–6)

Game	Date	Team	Score	High points	High rebounds	High assists	Location Attendance	Record
All-Star Break
17	August 1	Indiana	W 70–64	Tina Charles (22)	Tina Charles (12)	Renee Montgomery (5)	Mohegan Sun Arena; 4971	5–12
18	August 3	@ NY Liberty	W 88–66	Tina Charles (21)	Tina Charles (14)	Allison Hightower (8)	Prudential Center; 6245	6–12
19	August 6	Los Angeles	L 72–74	Tina Charles (25)	Tina Charles (13)	Allison Hightower (4)	Mohegan Sun Arena; 5792	6–13
20	August 9	Chicago	L 61–77	Allison Hightower (13)	Tina Charles (10)	Griffin, Hightower, & Montgomery (2)	Mohegan Sun Arena; 6086	6–14
21	August 11	@ Washington	L 63–74	Tina Charles (18)	Tina Charles (12)	Allison Hightower (5)	Verizon Center; 7725	6–15
22	August 14	Atlanta	W 88–86	Tina Charles (25)	Kelly Faris (7)	Renee Montgomery (4)	Mohegan Sun Arena; 5206	7–15
23	August 16	@ Atlanta	L 57–88	Iziane Castro Marques (18)	Kayla Pedersen (8)	Kelsey Griffin (2)	Philips Arena; 4435	7–16
24	August 18	@ Chicago	L 78–89	Tan White (16)	Kelly Faris (7)	Montgomery & Greene (4)	Allstate Arena; 5074	7–17
25	August 22	Minnesota	L 77–91	Tina Charles (22)	Tina Charles (12)	Renee Montgomery (5)	Mohegan Sun Arena; 7088	7–18
26	August 25	NY Liberty	L 66–74	Kelsey Griffin (22)	Kelsey Griffin (10)	Renee Montgomery (6)	Mohegan Sun Arena; 7004	7–19
27	August 27	@ Los Angeles	L 78–91	Iziane Castro Marques (19)	Tina Charles (9)	Montgomery, Castro Marques, & Carter (3)	Staples Center; 11401	7–20
28	August 29	@ Seattle	L 65–78	Tina Charles (18)	Mistie Bass (6)	Montgomery, White, & Bass (2)	Key Arena; 5567	7–21
29	August 31	@ Phoenix	L 68–76	Tina Charles (16)	Tina Charles (13)	Renee Montgomery (5)	US Airways Center; 8119	7–22

September: 3–2 (Home: 3–0; Road: 0–2)

Game	Date	Team	Score	High points	High rebounds	High assists	Location Attendance	Record
30	September 6	Washington	W 77–70	Tan White (26)	Mistie Bass (10)	Tan White (6)	Mohegan Sun Arena; 5611	8–22
31	September 7	@ Indiana	L 60–69	Kelsey Griffin (14)	Mistie Bass (11)	White, Montgomery, & Pedersen (2)	Bankers Life Fieldhouse; 9826	8–23
32	September 11	Atlanta	W 78–77	Mistie Bass (15)	Bass & Pedersen (6)	Renee Montgomery (7)	Mohegan Sun Arena; 5724	9–23
33	September 13	@ Washington	L 56–82	Mistie Bass (13)	Kayla Pedersen (7)	Mistie Bass (3)	Verizon Center; 7779	9–24
34	September 15	Indiana	W 82–80 (OT)	Iziane Castro Marques (19)	Mistie Bass (12)	Renee Montgomery (8)	Mohegan Sun Arena; 8478	10–24

2013 season schedule

== Statistics ==
Legend
GP	Games played	GS	Games started	MPG	Minutes per game	RPG	Rebounds per game
APG	Assists per game	SPG	Steals per game	BPG	Blocks per game	PPG	Points per game
FG%	Field-goal percentage	3P%	3-point field-goal percentage	FT%	Free-throw percentage	TO	Turnovers per game
PF	Fouls per game		Team leader		League leader

=== Regular season ===
Player	GP	GS	MPG	FG%	3P%	FT%	RPG	APG	SPG	BPG	PPG
