= 2012 Connecticut Sun season =

- Head coach: Mike Thibault
- Arena: Mohegan Sun Arena

Results
- Record: 25–9 (.735)
- Place: 1st (Eastern)
- Playoff finish: Lost in Conference Finals

Media
- Television: CPTV-S; ESPN2, NBATV

The 2012 WNBA season was the 14th season for the Connecticut Sun franchise of the Women's National Basketball Association. It is their tenth in Connecticut.

== Transactions ==
=== WNBA draft ===
The following are the Sun's selections in the 2012 WNBA draft.

Round	Pick	Player	Nationality	School/team/country
1	9	Astan Dabo	Mali	Mali
2	21	Chay Shegog	United States	North Carolina

=== Transaction log ===
- April 11, 2011: The Sun traded a third-round pick in the 2012 Draft to the Phoenix Mercury as part of the Tahnee Robinson trade.
- February 6: The Sun signed Mistie Mims.
- February 28: The Sun signed Sidney Spencer and Jessica Breland.
- March 16: The Sun signed Dawn Evans.
- April 17: The Sun signed Brittany Carter.
- April 26: The Sun signed draft pick Chay Shegog.
- April 30: The Sun signed Stefanie Murphy.
- May 5: The Sun waived Brittany Carter.
- May 8: The Sun waived Jessica Breland and Stefanie Murphy.
- May 15: The Sun waived Dawn Evans.
- May 16: The Sun waived Sidney Spencer.
- August 14: The Sun waived Chay Shegog.
- August 15: The Sun signed Jessica Moore.

=== Personnel changes ===
==== Additions ====
Player	Signed	Former team
Mistie Mims	February 6, 2012	Chicago Sky

==== Subtractions ====
Player	Left	New team
Jessica Breland	May 8, 2012	free agent

== Roster ==
=== Depth ===
Pos.	Starter	Bench
C	Tina Charles	Jessica Moore
PF	Asjha Jones	Mistie Mims; Kelsey Griffin
SF	Kalana Greene	Danielle McCray
SG	Kara Lawson	Tan White
PG	Allison Hightower	Renee Montgomery

== Season standings ==
Eastern Conference	W	L	PCT	GB	Home	Road	Conf.
Connecticut Sun ^{y}	25	9	.735	–	12–5	13–4	18–4
Indiana Fever ^{x}	22	12	.647	3.0	13–4	9–8	15–7
Atlanta Dream ^{x}	19	15	.559	6.0	11–6	8–9	12–10
New York Liberty ^{x}	15	19	.441	10.0	9–8	6–11	10–12
Chicago Sky ^{o}	14	20	.412	11.0	7–10	7–10	8–14
Washington Mystics ^{o}	5	29	.147	20.0	4–13	1–16	3–19

== Schedule ==
=== Preseason ===
2012 Game Log: Preseason (May)

Game	Date	Time (ET)	Opponent	TV	Score	High points	High rebounds	High assists	Location/Attendance	Record
1	Mon 7	7:00	New York		96-81	Greene; Jones (12)	McCray (6)	Lawson (7)	Mohegan Sun Arena; 4,287	1–0
2	Thu 10	7:00	Minnesota	CPTV-S	85-87	Lawson (19)	Griffin (9)	Montgomery (6)	Mohegan Sun Arena; 4,835	1-1
3	Mon 14	7:00	@ Washington		64-83	Jones (17)	Griffin; Shegog (5)	Lawson (4)	Verizon Center; 5,142	1–2

=== Regular season ===
2012 Game Log: Regular Season
May (3–0)

Game	Date	Time (ET)	Opponent	TV	Score	High points	High rebounds	High assists	Location/Attendance	Record
1	Sat 19	4:00	@ New York	MSG+	78-73	Charles (19)	Charles (13)	Lawson (6)	Madison Square Garden; 8,112	1–0
2	Sun 20	5:00	New York	CPTV-S	92-77	Charles (25)	Charles (11)	Montgomery (6)	Mohegan Sun Arena; 7,118	2–0
3	Fri 25	7:00	San Antonio	CPTV-S	83-79	Montgomery (23)	Charles (8)	Hightower; Jones (5)	Mohegan Sun Arena; 6,115	3–0

June (7–3)

Game	Date	Time (ET)	Opponent	TV	Score	High points	High rebounds	High assists	Location/Attendance	Record
4	Fri 1	7:00	Minnesota	CPTV-S	72-85	Charles (20)	Charles (12)	Lawson (4)	Mohegan Sun Arena; 7,249	3–1
5	Sun 3	3:00	Washington	CPTV-S	94-86	Charles (30)	Charles (9)	Charles; Greene; Lawson (4)	Mohegan Sun Arena; 7,065	4–1
6	Fri 8	7:00	@ Indiana		89-81	Lawson (18)	Charles (14)	Charles; McCray; Montgomery (3)	Bankers Life Fieldhouse; 6,041	5–1
7	Sun 10	5:00	Atlanta	CPTV-S	92-73	Charles (22)	Charles (11)	Hightower (5)	Mohegan Sun Arena; 6,526	6–1
8	Wed 13	8:00	Los Angeles	ESPN2	81-87	Charles (19)	Charles (13)	Lawson (4)	Mohegan Sun Arena; 6,058	6–2
9	Fri 15	7:00	New York		97-55	Charles (20)	Charles; Jones (8)	Greene (5)	Mohegan Sun Arena; 6,522	7–2
10	Sun 17	3:00	@ Atlanta	SSO	75-73	Charles (23)	Charles (22)	Lawson (4)	Philips Arena; 4,323	8–2
11	Tue 19	7:00	Indiana	CPTV-S	88-85 (OT)	Lawson (22)	Charles; Jones (8)	Greene; Lawson (3)	Mohegan Sun Arena; 6,503	9–2
12	Thu 21	7:00	@ Indiana	CPTV-S; FS-I	61-95	Mims (11)	Charles (8)	Lawson (2)	Bankers Life Fieldhouse; 6,326	9–3
13	Fri 29	7:00	@ Washington	CPTV-S; CSN-MA	77-64	Jones (20)	Jones (11)	Hightower (4)	Verizon Center; 6,975	10–3

July (5–1)

Game	Date	Time (ET)	Opponent	TV	Score	High points	High rebounds	High assists	Location/Attendance	Record
14	Sun 1	5:00	Seattle	CPTV-S	83-89 (OT)	Lawson (22)	Charles (14)	Hightower (4)	Mohegan Sun Arena; 9,201	10–4
15	Fri 6	8:00	@ Tulsa		86-79	Charles (24)	Charles; Jones (10)	Lawson (6)	BOK Center; 4,318	11–4
16	Sat 7	8:00	@ Minnesota	NBATV; CPTV-S	86-80	Lawson (22)	Charles (15)	Hightower (5)	Target Center; 10,882	12–4
17	Tue 10	11:30am	@ Washington	CPTV-S; CSN-MA	77-70	Lawson (17)	Charles (8)	Charles; Greene (4)	Verizon Center; 12,569	13–4
18	Wed 11	7:00	Washington		85-73	Jones (22)	Jones (9)	Montgomery (6)	Mohegan Sun Arena; 7,804	14–4
19	Fri 13	8:30	@ Chicago	CPTV-S; CN100	80-78 (OT)	Charles (25)	Charles (13)	Montgomery (4)	Allstate Arena; 5,988	15–4
Summer Olympic break

August (4–2)

Game	Date	Time (ET)	Opponent	TV	Score	High points	High rebounds	High assists	Location/Attendance	Record
Summer Olympic break
20	Thu 16	7:00	@ New York	NBATV; MSG	66-79	Montgomery (16)	Charles (12)	Lawson (4)	Prudential Center; 5,865	15–5
21	Sat 18	7:00	New York	CPTV-S	85-74	Charles (23)	Charles (9)	Lawson (5)	Mohegan Sun Arena; 8,232	16–5
22	Tue 21	7:00	Tulsa		82-80 (OT)	Lawson (19)	Mims (11)	Lawson; Montgomery (4)	Mohegan Sun Arena; 6,745	17–5
23	Sun 26	5:00	Chicago	CPTV-S	70-82	Hightower (17)	Charles (8)	Lawson (6)	Mohegan Sun Arena; 8,390	17–6
24	Tue 28	8:00	@ Chicago	CPTV-S; CN100	83-72	Charles (24)	Charles (14)	Lawson (6)	Allstate Arena; 2,884	18–6
25	Thu 30	8:00	@ San Antonio		84-73	Charles (20)	Charles; Griffin (10)	Hightower (8)	AT&T Center; 5,023	19–6

September (6–3)

Game	Date	Time (ET)	Opponent	TV	Score	High points	High rebounds	High assists	Location/Attendance	Record
26	Sun 2	3:00	@ Atlanta	NBATV; SSO	80-87	Lawson (16)	Charles (11)	Lawson (5)	Philips Arena; 5,020	19–7
27	Tue 4	7:00	@ Washington	CPTV-S	77-70	Charles (20)	Charles (13)	Mims; Lawson (4)	Verizon Center; 5,980	20–7
28	Fri 7	7:00	Phoenix	CPTV-S	82-91	Montgomery (25)	Mims (9)	Lawson (4)	Mohegan Sun Arena; 8,379	20–8
29	Sun 9	5:00	Chicago	CPTV-S	82-77	Charles (24)	Charles; Lawson (6)	Lawson (9)	Mohegan Sun Arena; 6,658	21–8
30	Wed 12	10:00	@ Phoenix	ESPN2; CPTV-S	100-78	Lawson (30)	Mims (9)	Lawson (7)	US Airways Center; 5,421	22–8
31	Fri 14	11:00	@ Los Angeles	NBATV; CPTV-S; TWC101	82-93	Charles (21)	Charles (13)	Lawson; Montgomery (4)	Staples Center; 10,503	22–9
32	Sun 16	9:00	@ Seattle	CPTV-S; KONG	60-58	Lawson (13)	Mims (11)	4 players (2)	KeyArena; 7,748	23–9
33	Wed 19	7:00	Indiana		73-67	Lawson (23)	Charles (12)	Lawson (6)	Mohegan Sun Arena; 5,811	24–9
34	Sun 23	5:00	Atlanta	CPTV-S	92-72	Lawson (21)	Charles (9)	Montgomery (7)	Mohegan Sun Arena; 9,143	25–9

All games are viewable on WNBA LiveAccess or ESPN3.com

=== Postseason ===
2012 Game Log: Postseason
Eastern Conference Semifinals

Game	Date	Time (ET)	Opponent	TV	Score	High points	High rebounds	High assists	Location/Attendance	Series
1	September 27	8:00	New York	ESPN2	65-60	Charles (17)	Jones (9)	Hightower; Lawson (5)	Mohegan Sun Arena; 5,520	1–0
2	September 29	7:00	@ New York	NBATV	75-62	Charles (25)	Charles (14)	Lawson (6)	Prudential Center; 7,854	2–0

Eastern Conference Finals

Game	Date	Time (ET)	Opponent	TV	Score	High points	High rebounds	High assists	Location/Attendance	Series
1	October 5	8:00	Indiana	ESPN2	76-64	Charles (18)	Charles (15)	Montgomery (7)	Mohegan Sun Arena; 7,599	1–0
2	October 8	8:00	@ Indiana	ESPN2	76-78	Lawson (18)	Jones (10)	Jones; Montgomery (4)	Bankers Life Fieldhouse; 9,225	1-1
3	October 11	8:30	Indiana	ESPN2	71-87	Charles (18)	Charles (10)	Lawson (4)	Mohegan Sun Arena; 6,516	1–2
