= 2011 Connecticut Sun season =

- Head coach: Mike Thibault
- Arena: Mohegan Sun Arena

Results
- Record: 21–13 (.618)
- Place: 2nd (Eastern)
- Playoff finish: Lost in Conference Semifinals

Media
- Television: CSN-NE; ESPN2, NBATV

The 2011 WNBA season was the 13th season for the Connecticut Sun franchise of the Women's National Basketball Association. It is their ninth in Connecticut.

== Transactions ==
=== WNBA draft ===
The following are the Sun's selections in the 2011 WNBA draft.

Round	Pick	Player	Nationality	School/team/country
2	16	Sydney Colson	United States	Texas A&M
3	28	Adrienne Johnson	United States	Louisiana Tech

=== Transaction log ===
- February 3: The Sun re-signed Tan White and Kerri Gardin.
- February 14: The Sun signed draft pick Danielle McCray.
- April 8: The Sun signed Rachele Fitz to a training camp contract.
- April 10: The Sun signed Stefanie Murphy to a training camp contract.
- April 11: The Sun traded a third-round pick in the 2012 Draft to the Phoenix Mercury in exchange for draft rights to Tahnee Robinson.
- April 11: The Sun traded draft rights to Sydney Colson to the New York Liberty in exchange for Kalana Greene.
- May 25: The Sun waived Adrienne Johnson, Tahnee Robinson, and Rachele Fitz.
- June 1: The Sun waived Stefanie Murphy.
- June 3: The Sun signed Jessica Moore and waived Kerri Gardin.
- July 22: The Sun waived DeMya Walker.
- July 24: The Sun signed Jessica Breland to a seven-day contract.

=== Trades ===
Date	Trade	
April 11, 2011	To Connecticut Sun	To Phoenix Mercury
April 11, 2011	Tahnee Robinson	third-round pick in 2012 Draft
April 11, 2011	To Connecticut Sun	To New York Liberty
April 11, 2011	Kalana Greene	Sydney Colson

=== Personnel changes ===
==== Additions ====
Player	Signed	Former team
Danielle McCray	February 14, 2011	unsigned 2010 draft pick
Kalana Greene	April 11, 2011	New York Liberty
Jessica Moore	June 3, 2011	free agent
Jessica Breland	July 24, 2011	free agent

==== Subtractions ====
Player	Left	New team
Anete Jekabsone-Zogota	February 3, 2011	hiatus
Sandrine Gruda	May 15, 2011	hiatus
Kerri Gardin	June 3, 2011	free agent
DeMya Walker	July 22, 2011	free agent

== Roster ==
2011 Connecticut Sun roster
Players
Coaches

Pos.	No.	Nat.	Name	Height	Weight	DOB	From	Yrs
F	51	(United States)	Breland, Jessica	6' 3" (1.91m)	165 lb (75kg)	1988-02-23	North Carolina	R
C	31	(United States)	Charles, Tina	6' 4" (1.93m)	198 lb (90kg)	1988-12-05	Connecticut	1
G	32	(United States)	Greene, Kalana	5' 10" (1.78m)	170 lb (77kg)	1987-07-13	Connecticut	1
F	5	(United States)	Griffin, Kelsey	6' 2" (1.88m)	179 lb (81kg)	1987-07-02	Nebraska	1
G	23	(United States)	Hightower, Allison	5' 10" (1.78m)	139 lb (63kg)	1988-04-06	LSU	1
F	15	(United States)	Jones, Asjha	6' 3" (1.91m)	196 lb (89kg)	1980-08-01	Connecticut	9
G	20	(United States)	Lawson, Kara	5' 9" (1.75m)	169 lb (77kg)	1981-02-14	Tennessee	8
G/F	4	(United States)	McCray, Danielle	5' 11" (1.8m)	174 lb (79kg)	1987-10-08	Kansas	R
G	21	(United States)	Montgomery, Renee	5' 7" (1.7m)	143 lb (65kg)	1986-12-02	Connecticut	2
F/C	30	(United States)	Moore, Jessica	6' 3" (1.91m)	175 lb (79kg)	1982-07-09	Connecticut	6
G/F	14	(United States)	White, Tan	5' 7" (1.7m)	154 lb (70kg)	1982-09-27	Mississippi State	6

Head coach
(United States) Mike Thibault (Saint Martin's)
Assistant coaches
(United States) Scott Hawk (Omaha)
(United States) Bernadette Mattox (Georgia)
Athletic trainer
(United States) Jeremy Norman (Keene State)
Strength and conditioning coach
(United States) Jodi Hopkins (Ohio)

Legend

- (C) Team captain
- (DP) Unsigned draft pick
- (FA) Free agent
- (S) Suspended
- Injured

=== Depth ===
Pos.	Starter	Bench
C	Tina Charles	Jessica Moore
PF	Asjha Jones	Kelsey Griffin; Jessica Breland
SF	Kalana Greene	Tan White
SG	Danielle McCray	Kara Lawson
PG	Renee Montgomery	Allison Hightower

== Season standings ==
Eastern Conference	W	L	PCT	GB	Home	Road	Conf.
Indiana Fever ^{x}	21	13	.618	–	13–4	8–9	13–9
Connecticut Sun ^{x}	21	13	.618	–	15–2	6–11	14–8
Atlanta Dream ^{x}	20	14	.588	1.0	11–6	9–8	14–8
New York Liberty ^{x}	19	15	.559	2.0	12-5	7–10	11–11
Chicago Sky ^{o}	14	20	.412	7.0	10–7	4–13	10–12
Washington Mystics ^{o}	6	28	.176	15.0	4–13	2–15	4–18

== Schedule ==
=== Preseason ===
2011 Game Log: Preseason

Game	Date	Time (ET)	Opponent	Score	High points	High rebounds	High assists	Location/Attendance	Record
1	May 19	7:00pm	China	101–63	Greene, Griffin (13)	Charles (10)	Montgomery (6)	Mohegan Sun Arena; 4,666	1–0
2	May 25	7:00pm	San Antonio	56–80	White (15)	Charles (17)	Lawson (5)	Mohegan Sun Arena; 4,801	1–1
3	May 27	7:00pm	San Antonio	75–73	Charles (17)	Charles (11)	Jones (4)	Mohegan Sun Arena at Casey Plaza; 2,139	2–1

=== Regular season ===
2011 Game Log: Regular Season
June

Game	Date	Time (ET)	Opponent	TV	Score	High points	High rebounds	High assists	Location/Attendance	Record
1	June 4	7:00pm	Washington		89–73	Charles (18)	Jones (7)	Lawson (4)	Mohegan Sun Arena; 6,666	1–0
2	June 10	8:30pm	@ Chicago		75–78	Montgomery (22)	Greene (6)	Lawson; Montgomery; White (4)	Allstate Arena; 6,609	1–1
3	June 12	3:00pm	Tulsa		90–79	Charles (19)	Charles (8)	Montgomery (7)	Mohegan Sun Arena; 6,520	2–1
4	June 16	7:00pm	@ Washington	CSN-MA	79–71	Charles (26)	Charles (10)	Montgomery (5)	Verizon Center; 7,028	3–1
5	June 19	1:00pm	Chicago		83–68	Charles (31)	Charles (12)	Jones (4)	Mohegan Sun Arena; 6,875	4–1
6	June 23	8:00pm	@ Chicago	CN100	101–107 (2OT)	Montgomery (33)	Charles (13)	Montgomery (6)	Allstate Arena; 3,319	4–2
7	June 25	7:00pm	@ Indiana	NBATV; CSN-NE	70–75	Montgomery (19)	Charles (11)	Montgomery (6)	Conseco Fieldhouse; 7,100	4–3
8	June 28	8:00pm	Los Angeles	ESPN2	79–76	Charles (22)	Charles (23)	Montgomery (5)	Mohegan Sun Arena; 6,515	5–3

July

Game	Date	Time (ET)	Opponent	TV	Score	High points	High rebounds	High assists	Location/Attendance	Record
9	July 1	7:30pm	Seattle	CSN-NE	75–70	Charles (20)	Charles (10)	Montgomery (8)	Mohegan Sun Arena; 7,748	6–3
10	July 9	8:00pm	@ Minnesota	NBATV; FS-N	67–90	Montgomery (14)	Charles (8)	Jones; Lawson (3)	Target Center; 8,205	6–4
11	July 13	1:00pm	@ Indiana		78–90	White (17)	Charles (11)	Montgomery (4)	Conseco Fieldhouse; 9,045	6–5
12	July 15	7:00pm	@ New York	NBATV; CSN-NE	68–59	Charles (15)	Jones (7)	Montgomery (4)	Prudential Center; 7,722	7–5
13	July 17	5:00pm	Indiana		76–71	McCray (22)	Charles (14)	Montgomery (7)	Mohegan Sun Arena; 7,075	8–5
14	July 19	7:30pm	New York		85–79	Charles (24)	Charles (7)	Montgomery (10)	Mohegan Sun Arena; 6,096	9–5
All-Star break
15	July 26	8:00pm	@ Chicago	CSN-NE; CN100	77–66	Jones (22)	Charles (15)	Montgomery (6)	Allstate Arena; 3,091	10–5
16	July 28	7:30pm	Indiana		58–69	Charles (13)	Charles (10)	Montgomery (3)	Mohegan Sun Arena; 6,329	10–6
17	July 31	5:00pm	Atlanta		99–92	Montgomery (19)	Charles (11)	Lawson (9)	Mohegan Sun Arena; 6,955	11–6

August

Game	Date	Time (ET)	Opponent	TV	Score	High points	High rebounds	High assists	Location/Attendance	Record
18	August 3	3:00pm	@ Los Angeles	NBATV	79–70	Charles (20)	Charles (13)	Montgomery (6)	STAPLES Center; 14,266	12–6
19	August 5	10:00pm	@ Seattle	NBATV	79–81	Montgomery (19)	Charles (10)	White (4)	KeyArena; 7,289	12–7
20	August 7	6:00pm	@ Phoenix	NBATV; FS-A	96–95 (OT)	Montgomery (28)	Charles (17)	Greene (6)	US Airways Center; 8,514	13–7
21	August 9	7:30pm	Chicago		69–58	Charles (16)	Charles (11)	Lawson; White (4)	Mohegan Sun Arena; 6,049	14–7
22	August 11	7:30pm	San Antonio	FS-SW	59–72	Jones (16)	Jones (10)	McCray (2)	Mohegan Sun Arena; 5,334	14–8
23	August 13	7:00pm	Washington		82–75	Charles; Montgomery (16)	White (10)	Jones; Lawson (5)	Mohegan Sun Arena; 6,717	15–8
24	August 16	7:30pm	Minnesota	CSN-NE	108–79	Montgomery (17)	Charles (18)	Montgomery (7)	Mohegan Sun Arena; 9,323	16–8
25	August 18	7:00pm	@ New York	NBATV; MSG	81–84 (OT)	Charles (29)	Charles (14)	Montgomery (5)	Prudential Center; 7,245	16–9
26	August 19	7:30pm	@ Atlanta	NBATV; SSO	88–94 (OT)	Jones (21)	Charles; Griffin (11)	Montgomery (7)	Philips Arena; 7,225	16–10
27	August 21	5:00pm	Atlanta		96–87	Montgomery (21)	Jones (10)	Montgomery (8)	Mohegan Sun Arena; 6,636	17–10
28	August 26	7:30pm	Phoenix	CSN-NE	95–92	Charles (17)	Jones (11)	Montgomery (6)	Mohegan Sun Arena; 9,007	18–10
29	August 28	4:00pm	@ Tulsa		72–83	Charles (21)	Charles (10)	Charles; Jones; Montgomery (3)	BOK Center; 4,813	18–11
30	August 30	8:00pm	@ San Antonio		66–78	Charles (16)	Jones (10)	Charles; Montgomery (4)	AT&T Center; 6,934	18–12

September

Game	Date	Time (ET)	Opponent	TV	Score	High points	High rebounds	High assists	Location/Attendance	Record
31	September 2	7:30pm	Indiana		83–55	McCray (14)	Charles (16)	Charles (7)	Mohegan Sun Arena; 6,991	19–12
32	September 4	4:00pm	@ Washington	NBATV; CSN-MA	79–48	Charles (24)	Charles (15)	Montgomery (7)	Verizon Center; 13,403	20–12
33	September 6	7:30pm	@ Atlanta	SSO	74–85	Charles (17)	Charles (12)	Montgomery (7)	Philips Arena; 6,558	20–13
34	September 11	1:00pm	New York	NBATV	69–63	Charles (18)	Charles; Jones (11)	Montgomery (4)	Mohegan Sun Arena; 9,115	21–13

All games are viewable on WNBA LiveAccess or ESPN3.com

=== Postseason ===
2011 Game Log: Postseason
Eastern Conference Semifinals

Game	Date	Time (ET)	Opponent	TV	Score	High points	High rebounds	High assists	Location/Attendance	Series
1	September 16	7:00pm	Atlanta	NBATV	84–89	Jones; Montgomery (16)	McCray (8)	Lawson (4)	Mohegan Sun Arena; 7,373	0–1
2	September 18	3:00pm	@ Atlanta	ESPN2	64-69	Jones (15)	Charles (17)	Montgomery (6)	Philips Arena; 6,887	0–2

== Statistics ==
Legend
GP	Games played	GS	Games started	MPG	Minutes per game	RPG	Rebounds per game
APG	Assists per game	SPG	Steals per game	BPG	Blocks per game	PPG	Points per game
FG%	Field-goal percentage	3P%	3-point field-goal percentage	FT%	Free-throw percentage	TO	Turnovers per game
PF	Fouls per game		Team leader		League leader

=== Regular season ===
Player	GP	GS	MPG	FG%	3P%	FT%	RPG	APG	SPG	BPG	PPG
Jessica Breland	4	0	1.5	.500	.000	.000	0.0	0.0	0.00	0.25	0.5
Tina Charles	34	34	33.4	.468	.000	.687	11.0	1.9	0.76	1.76	17.6
Kalana Greene	33	33	23.7	.422	.391	.600	3.8	1.5	0.91	0.36	5.6
Kelsey Griffin	34	2	13.0	.357	.167	.731	3.1	0.5	0.74	0.29	3.6
Allison Hightower	25	2	9.2	.339	.222	.750	0.6	0.5	0.44	0.04	2.0
Asjha Jones	34	34	28.6	.444	.300	.711	6.4	1.9	0.62	0.47	13.3
Kara Lawson	33	8	25.2	.449	.430	.890	2.6	2.9	0.70	0.03	10.4
Danielle McCray	34	23	15.1	.399	.391	.771	2.3	1.2	0.47	0.12	5.9
Renee Montgomery	34	34	29.1	.400	.384	.829	2.1	4.9	1.44	0.09	14.6
Jessica Moore	29	0	6.9	.425	.000	.778	0.8	0.2	0.17	0.07	1.7
DeMya Walker	10	0	8.0	.421	.000	.727	1.6	0.0	0.20	0.00	2.4
Tan White	34	0	22.0	.354	.280	.840	2.9	1.9	1.18	0.18	5.9

=== Postseason ===
Player	GP	GS	MPG	FG%	3P%	FT%	RPG	APG	SPG	BPG	PPG
Jessica Breland	0	0	–	–	–	–	–	–	–	–	–
Tina Charles	2	2	36.0	.313	.000	.625	12.0	2.0	1.00	2.50	12.5
Kalana Greene	2	2	22.0	.389	.600	1.000	2.0	1.0	1.50	1.00	9.5
Kelsey Griffin	2	0	8.0	.200	.000	.500	0.0	0.0	0.00	0.50	1.5
Allison Hightower	2	0	14.5	.571	.667	1.000	2.0	0.5	1.00	0.00	6.0
Asjha Jones	2	2	32.0	.366	.000	.500	6.5	2.5	1.50	1.50	15.5
Kara Lawson	2	0	18.5	.400	.571	.750	0.5	3.5	0.00	0.00	7.5
Danielle McCray	2	2	15.0	.250	.000	1.000	5.5	0.5	0.00	0.00	2.5
Renee Montgomery	2	2	28.5	.471	.333	.875	1.5	4.5	0.50	0.50	13.0
Jessica Moore	2	0	4.0	1.000	.000	1.000	0.5	0.0	0.00	0.00	2.0
Tan White	2	0	21.5	1.000	1.000	1.000	2.5	3.0	1.50	0.00	4.0

== Awards and honors ==
- Tina Charles was named WNBA Eastern Conference Player of the Week for the week of June 13, 2011.
- Tina Charles was named WNBA Eastern Conference Player of the Week for the week of June 27, 2011.
- Tina Charles was named WNBA Eastern Conference Player of the Week for the week of July 18, 2011.
- Tina Charles was named WNBA Eastern Conference Player of the Week for the week of August 29, 2011.
- Tina Charles was named WNBA Eastern Conference Player of the Month for the month of June.
- Tina Charles was named to the 2011 WNBA All-Star Team as a starter.
- Renee Montgomery was named to the 2011 WNBA All-Star Team as a reserve.
- Tina Charles finished as a Peak Performer, averaging 11.0 rebounds per game.
- Tina Charles was named to the All-Defensive Second Team.
- Tina Charles was named to the All-WNBA First Team.
