= Kalana Greene =

American basketball player (born 1987)

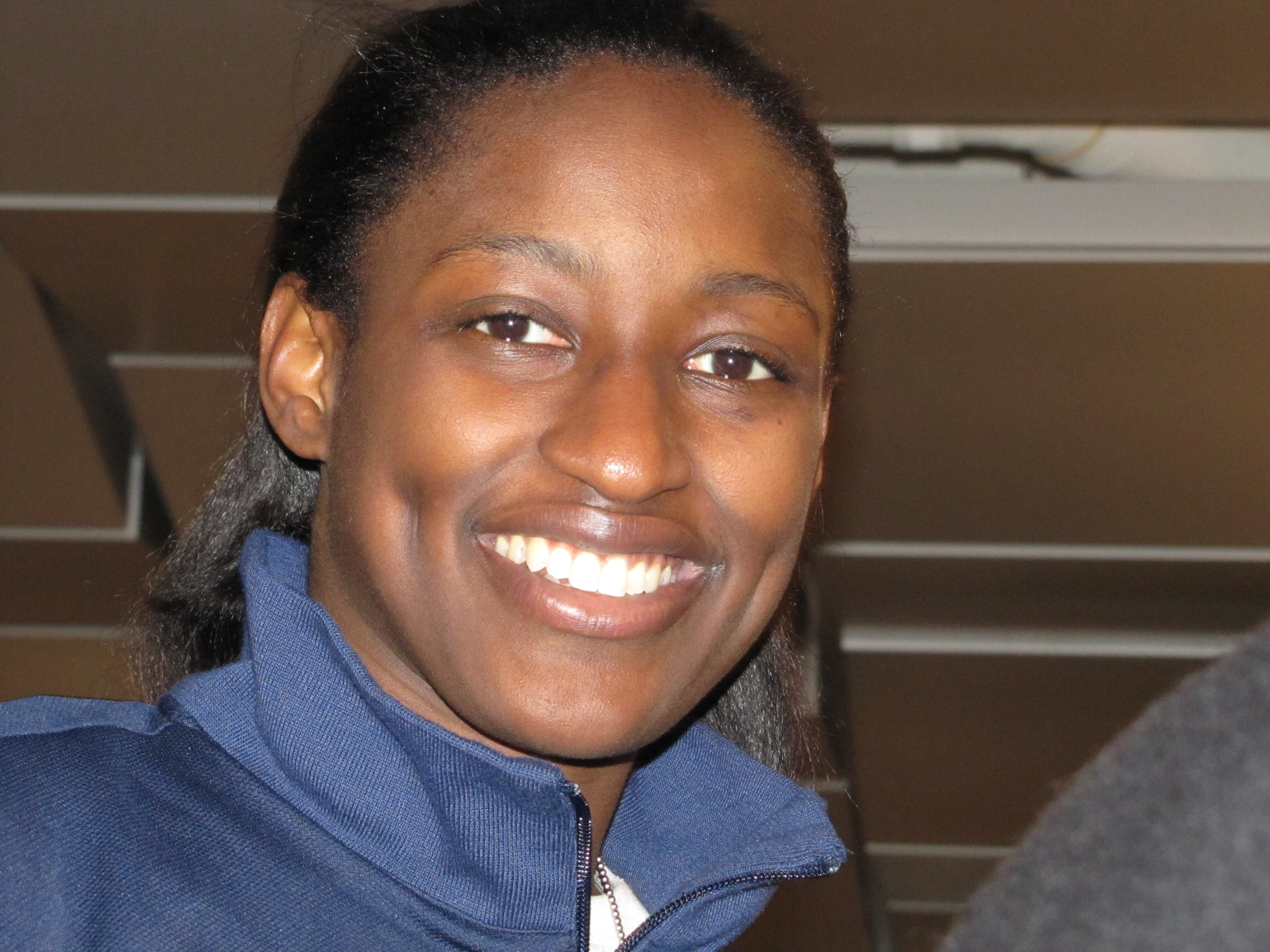

Personal information
- Born: July 13, 1987 (age 39)
- Listed height: 5 ft 10 in (1.78 m)
- Listed weight: 155 lb (70 kg)

Career information
- High school: Timberland (St. Stephen, South Carolina)
- College: UConn (2005–2010)
- WNBA draft: 2010: 2nd round, 13th overall pick
- Drafted by: New York Liberty
- Playing career: 2010–present
- Position: Guard

Career history
- 2010: New York Liberty
- 2011–2013: Connecticut Sun
- 2014: Washington Mystics
- 2015: San Antonio Stars
- 2015: Minnesota Lynx

Career highlights
- WNBA champion (2015); WNBA All-Rookie Team (2010); NCAA champion (2009, 2010); Big East Tournament MOP (2010); First-team All-Big East (2010); South Carolina Miss Basketball (2005)
- Stats at WNBA.com
- Stats at Basketball Reference

Kalana Lanette Greene (born July 13, 1987), is an American former professional women's basketball guard who played in the Women's National Basketball Association (WNBA), and for CCC Polkowice in Poland. She played her college career at the University of Connecticut, where the Huskies were the 2009 and 2010 NCAA national Champions.

== Early life ==
Greene grew up in St. Stephen, South Carolina, as the daughter of Addison and Cynthia Greene. Greene played basketball for Timberland High School in St. Stephen, South Carolina. She helped her team win twenty or more games for three consecutive seasons, and in her senior year, she led the team to its first ever state championship. She averaged 17 points per game as a freshman; by the time she was a senior, she averaged 28 points, 18 rebounds, nine steals and eight assists per game.

Greene was named a WBCA All-American. She participated in the 2005 WBCA High School All-America Game, where she scored four points.

== College career ==
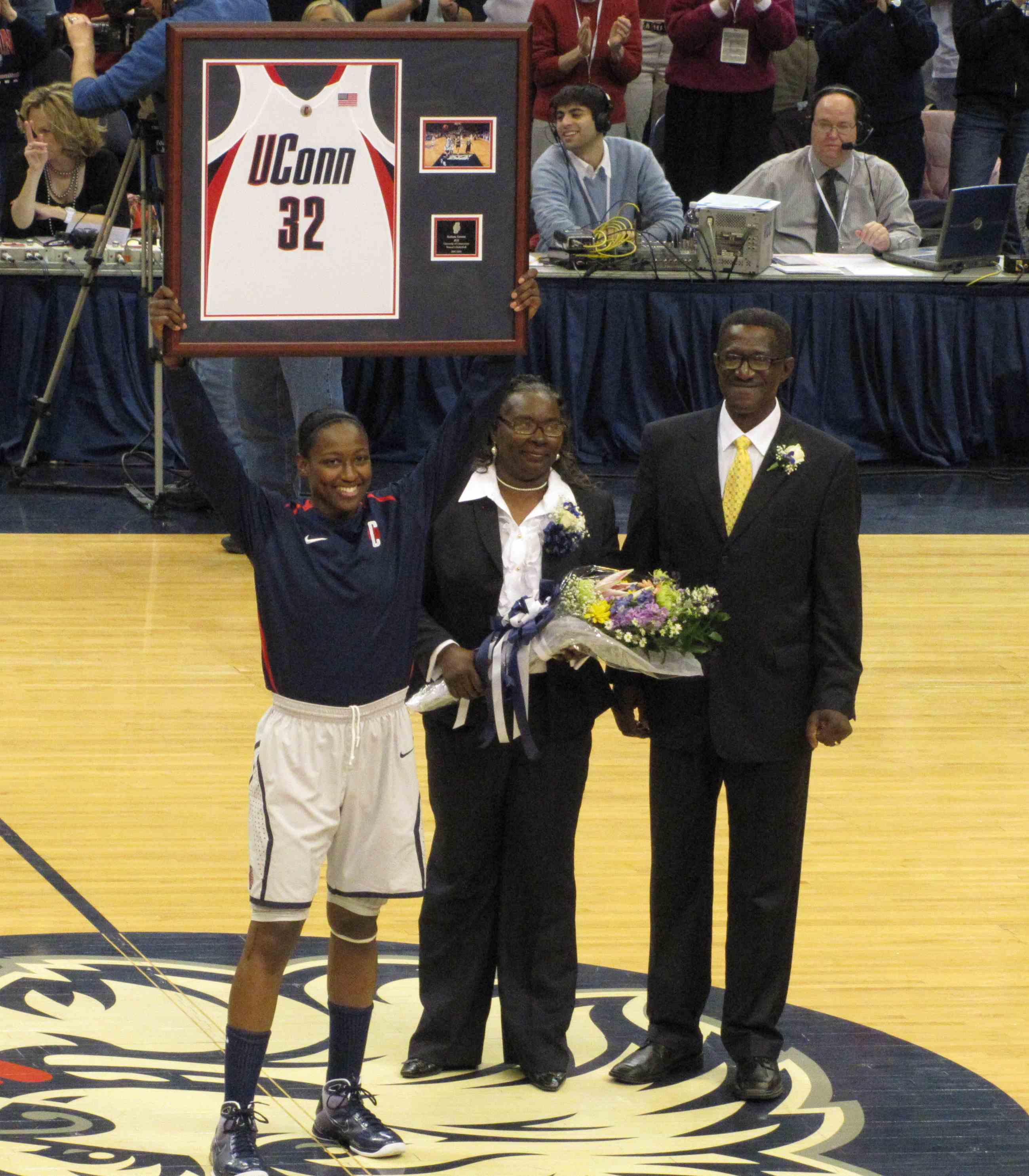
Kalana Greene with her parents at Senior Day ceremonies February 27, 2010

Greene's choices came down to Georgia and Connecticut. She liked the Georgia program, but the UConn program, with both a family atmosphere and an expectation you have to work hard for everything you get swayed her to choose to come to join the University of Connecticut Huskies.

Greene suffered a major knee injury in a game on December 17, 2007, against South Carolina, an injury that would end her season. It turned out to be a damaged ACL and torn LCL. UConn rarely played South Carolina, but set up a two-game series, with a game in 2007 against South Carolina in Connecticut, with a return trip to South Carolina in 2008, scheduled so that Greene could play in her home state as a senior. Her coach, Geno Auriemma, worried it might be a career-ending injury.

That day when she got hurt, I was really in a somber mood because I thought this could be the end of Kalana's career

— Geno Auriemma,

She worked hard to rehabilitate her knee, including staying on campus over the summer to work out in the gym every day. She played the following season, for a team that won the national championship, although not at the same level as before her injury. During the year, she had to make a decision whether to leave as an academic senior, or return for a fifth year. Players who are injured during a year can get an additional year of eligibility, if they have not played too many games in the season. Greene's injury occurred in the eighth game of her junior season, so she was eligible to return if she chose. She considered her options, and chose to return for a fifth year.

On March 9, 2010, Greene played in her 151st game as a UConn Husky, more than any other player in UConn Women's basketball history, breaking the mark held by Renee Montgomery. Greene played in 157 games in her complete college career, an NCAA record.

Greene helped lead UConn to the Championship of the Big East Tournament, and earned Most Outstanding Player of the tournament for her performance.

== WNBA career ==
Greene was the 13th overall selection in the 2010 WNBA draft, selected by the New York Liberty. After playing one season for the Liberty, she was traded to the Connecticut Sun for the draft rights of Sydney Colson, the Texas A&M guard selected by the Sun in the second round of the 2011 WNBA draft.

== Europe ==
Greene plays for CCC Polkowice in Poland – silver medalist of the PLKK 2010/2011 season.

== Career statistics ==
=== WNBA ===
Legend
GP	Games played	GS	Games started	MPG	Minutes per game	RPG	Rebounds per game
APG	Assists per game	SPG	Steals per game	BPG	Blocks per game	PPG	Points per game
TO	Turnovers per game	FG%	Field-goal percentage	3P%	3-point field-goal percentage	FT%	Free-throw percentage
**Bold**	Career best	°	League leader

†	Denotes seasons in which Greene won a WNBA championship

==== Regular season ====
Year	Team	GP	GS	MPG	FG%	3P%	FT%	RPG	APG	SPG	BPG	TO	PPG
2010	New York	33	0	15.7	**.464**	.333	.625	1.6	0.9	0.4	0.2	1.1	4.5
2011	Connecticut	33	**33**	23.7	.422	**.391**	.600	**3.8**	1.5	0.9	**0.4**	0.9	**5.6**
2012	Connecticut	**34**	31	17.8	.438	.227	.696	1.9	**1.7**	**1.1**	0.2	0.8	4.2
2013	Connecticut	**34**	31	**26.1**	.407	.154	.732	3.7	1.5	**1.1**	**0.4**	1.1	5.1
2014	Washington	20	0	3.9	.400	.000	.750	0.6	0.1	0.4	0.0	0.0	0.8
2015	San Antonio	11	6	19.9	.365	.154	**1.000**	2.9	0.7	0.7	0.3	0.3	4.4
2015^{†}	Minnesota	2	0	12.0	.000	.000	.667	1.5	1.5	0.5	0.0	0.0	2.0
Career	6 years, 5 teams	167	101	18.6	.422	.275	.684	2.5	1.2	0.8	0.3	0.8	4.3

==== Playoffs ====
Year	Team	GP	GS	MPG	FG%	3P%	FT%	RPG	APG	SPG	BPG	TO	PPG
2010	New York	**5**	0	3.0	.200	.000	.500	0.4	0.0	0.0	0.0	0.0	0.6
2011	Connecticut	2	2	**22.0**	.389	.600	1.000	2.0	**1.0**	**1.5**	**1.0**	1.5	**9.5**
2012	Connecticut	**5**	**5**	12.2	.286	.000	**1.000**	**2.2**	0.2	0.2	0.4	1.0	1.8
2014	Washington	2	0	7.0	**.500**	**1.000**	.500	0.5	0.0	0.0	0.0	0.0	2.0
Career	4 years, 3 teams	14	7	9.6	.333	.444	.714	1.3	0.2	0.3	0.3	0.6	2.5

=== College ===
Kalana Greene Statistics at University of Connecticut
Year	G	FG	FGA	PCT	3FG	3FGA	PCT	FT	FTA	PCT	REB	AVG	A	TO	B	S	MIN	PTS	AVG
2005–06	35	58	132	0.439	1	5	0.200	30	47	0.638	74	2.1	12.0	28	9	16	475	147	4.2
2006–07	36	187	375	0.499	3	24	0.125	71	104	0.683	270	7.5	65.0	71	13	57	1048	448	12.4
2007-08	8	29	51	0.569	2	10	0.200	6	7	0.857	41	5.1	18.0	13	6	9	178	66	8.3
2008–09	39	141	242	0.583	6	30	0.200	50	65	0.769	181	4.6	68.0	61	11	37	990	338	8.7
2009–10	39	190	326	0.583	11	24	0.458	54	78	0.692	182	4.7	65.0	60	62	60	1009	445	11.4
Totals	157	605	1126	0.537	23	93	0.247	211	301	0.701	748	4.8	228	233	101	179	3700	1444	9.2

== Awards and honors ==
- WBCA All-American.
- Kalana Greene All-BIG EAST First Team
- Kalana Greene Big East Tournament Most Outstanding Player

== See also ==
- List of Connecticut women's basketball players with 1000 points
- 2008–09 Connecticut Huskies women's basketball team
- 2009–10 Connecticut Huskies women's basketball team
