= Mistie Bass =

American basketball player (born 1983)

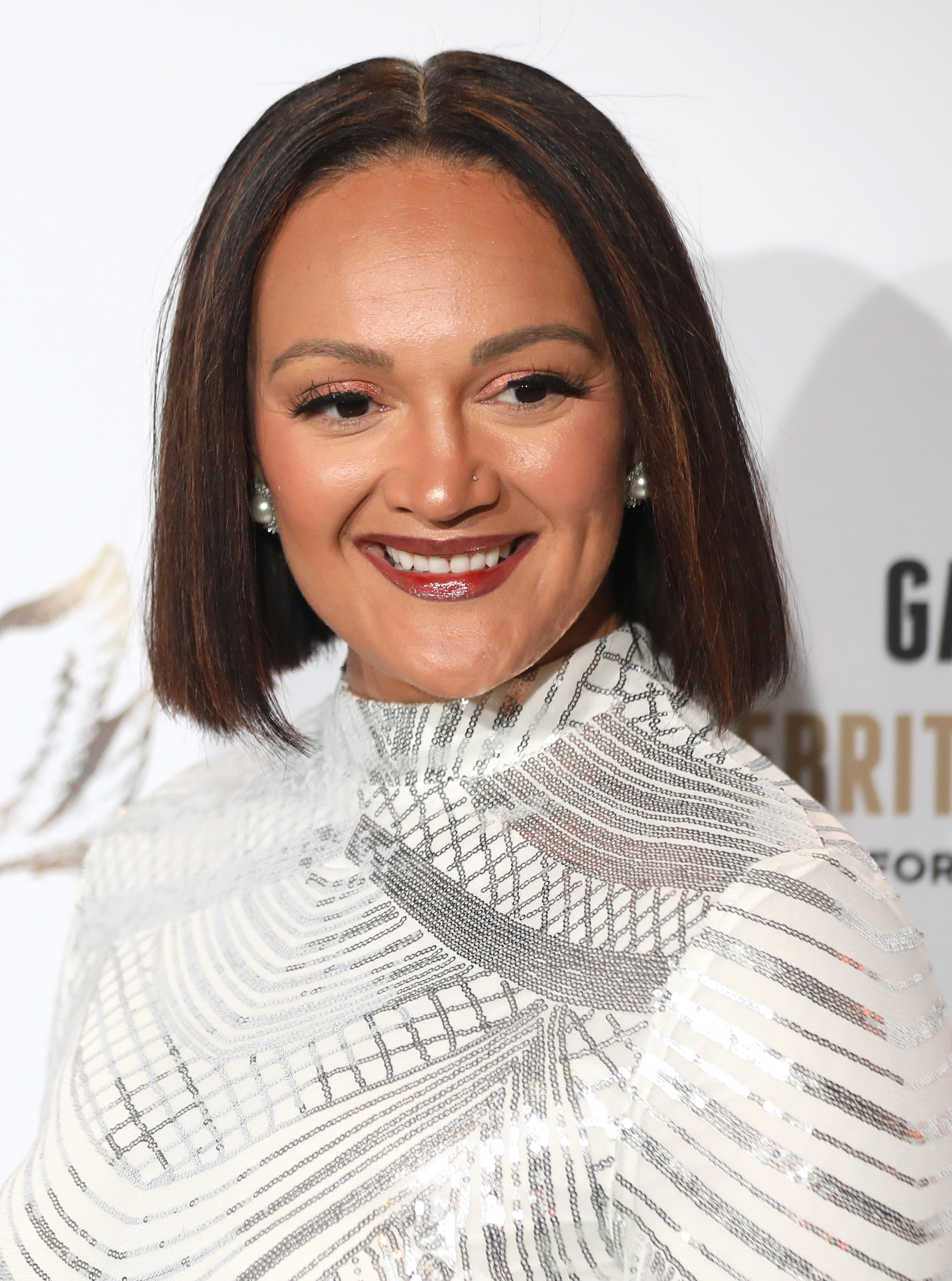
- Bass in 2023

Personal information
- Born: December 2, 1983 (age 42) Janesville, Wisconsin, U.S.
- Listed height: 6 ft 3 in (1.91 m)
- Listed weight: 189 lb (86 kg)

Career information
- High school: George S. Parker (Janesville, Wisconsin)
- College: Duke (2002–2006)
- WNBA draft: 2006: 2nd round, 21st overall pick
- Drafted by: Phoenix Mercury
- Playing career: 2006–present
- Position: Forward
- Number: 8

Career history
- 2006–2008: Houston Comets
- 2009–2010: Chicago Sky
- 2012–2013: Connecticut Sun
- 2014–2016: Phoenix Mercury
- 2017–2018: Canberra Capitals

Career highlights
- WNBA champion (2014); ACC All-Freshman Team (2003); McDonald's All-American (2002); 3× Wisconsin Miss Basketball (2000–2002)
- Stats at WNBA.com
- Stats at Basketball Reference

Mistie McCray Bass (born December 2, 1983) is an American former professional women's basketball player.

== High school ==
Bass graduated from George S. Parker High School in Janesville, Wisconsin, in 2002, having helped the school win the state championship two years in a row. As a freshman, she broke a defender's arm while the defender attempted to take a charge. She is the only player in the state to be named Player of the Year three times. She also was elected first team USA Today All-America, second team Parade All-America, second team School Sports All-America, third team Student Sports All-America, two time Wisconsin Gatorade Play of the year and first team All-State. Mistie was selected to play in the Phoenix/WBCA High School All-America game, notching six points and nine rebounds. Bass played in the inaugural McDonald's All-America game.

== College career ==
She graduated from Duke University in 2006. At Duke, she played for the Blue Devils and was a part of two Final Fours; 2003 and 2006 (Contended in the National Championship game). She finished her career ranking eighth in points (1,409), eighth in field goals made (557), fifth in field goal percentage (.567), fifth in rebounds (800), fifth in blocks (131), eighth in free throws made (295), seventh in free throws attempted (459), eighth in double-figure scoring games (78), first in wins (127) and tied for fourth in ACC regular season wins (55). She was also a member of Zeta Phi Beta sorority.

=== Duke statistics ===
Legend
GP	Games played	GS	Games started	MPG	Minutes per game
FG%	Field goal percentage	3P%	3-point field goal percentage	FT%	Free throw percentage
RPG	Rebounds per game	APG	Assists per game	SPG	Steals per game
BPG	Blocks per game	PPG	Points per game	**Bold**	Career high

Year	Team	GP	Points	FG%	3P%	FT%	RPG	APG	SPG	BPG	PPG
2002–03	Duke	**37**	256	49.2%	0.0%	**67.8%**	3.7	0.8	0.6	0.7	6.9
2003–04	Duke	34	341	61.1%	0.0%	63.1%	5.4	0.8	0.9	**1.2**	10.0
2004–05	Duke	36	**420**	53.8%	0.0%	61.3%	**7.2**	**1.8**	**1.1**	0.8	**11.7**
2005–06	Duke	35	392	**61.8%**	0.0%	64.9%	6.3	1.6	0.9	0.9	11.2
Career		142	1409	56.7%	0.0%	64.3%	5.6	1.2	0.9	0.9	9.9

== Professional career ==
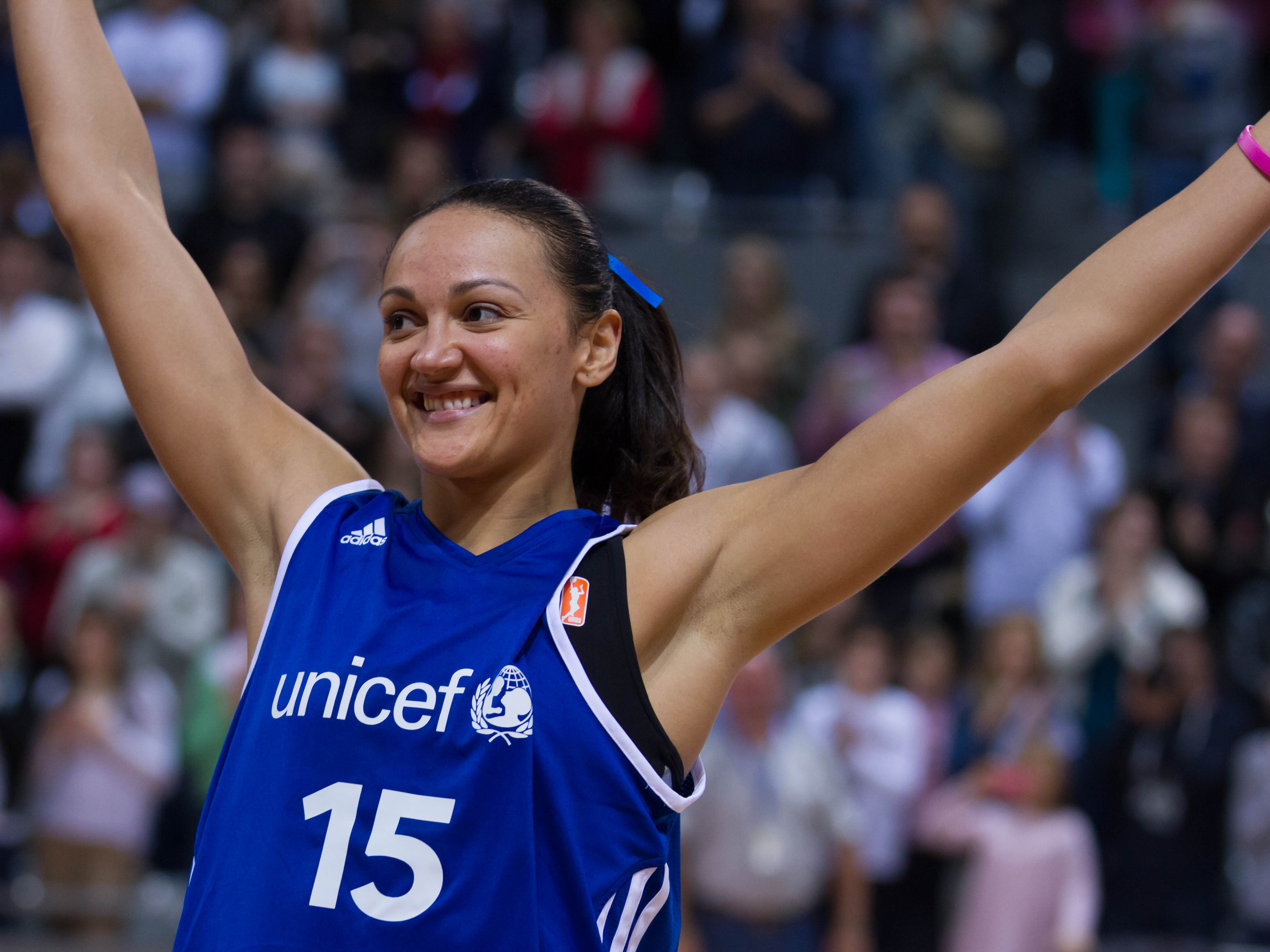
Bass in 2014

During the 2006 WNBA draft, Bass was originally selected by the Phoenix Mercury but was later traded to the Houston Comets. In her first season Bass played sparingly, averaging 10.1 minutes per game, behind all-stars Sheryl Swoopes, Tina Thompson and Dawn Staley. During 2007 and 2008, Bass continued to play as a reserve forward for the Comets, wearing jersey number 8.

After the Comets disbanded in the fall of 2008, Bass was selected by the Chicago Sky as the third pick in the dispersal draft for former Comets players.

She played for Mersin in Turkey during the 2008–09 WNBA off-season.

She played for the Connecticut Sun for two seasons (2012–2013).

She won a WNBA championship in the 2014 season with the Phoenix Mercury.

Bass played one season with UC Canberra Capitals in the Australian WNBL 2017/2018

== Personal life ==
She is the daughter of Pamela Bass and rock and roll singer and dancer Chubby Checker. She is married to former football player Shane Boyd and has two children.

== WNBA career statistics ==
=== WNBA career statistics ===
Legend
GP	Games played	GS	Games started	MPG	Minutes per game	RPG	Rebounds per game
APG	Assists per game	SPG	Steals per game	BPG	Blocks per game	PPG	Points per game
TO	Turnovers per game	FG%	Field-goal percentage	3P%	3-point field-goal percentage	FT%	Free-throw percentage
**Bold**	Career best	°	League leader

==== Regular season ====
Year	Team	GP	GS	MPG	FG%	3P%	FT%	RPG	APG	SPG	BPG	TO	PPG
2006	Houston	27	6	10.1	53.1	0.0	32.4	2.4	0.6	0.4	0.1	**0.4**	2.9
2007	Houston	19	0	5.3	28.1	0.0	25.0	1.5	0.3	0.3	0.3	0.6	1.2
2008	Houston	32	0	11.4	50.5	0.0	54.9	2.4	0.6	0.4	0.3	0.8	3.8
2009	Chicago	8	5	15.8	51.3	0.0	56.3	3.4	0.4	0.6	0.4	0.5	6.1
2010	Chicago	**34**	**20**	**18.9**	52.7	0.0	62.5	3.9	**1.1**	0.6	0.4	1.1	4.9
2012	Connecticut	32	10	18.7	52.9	0.0	71.3	**4.5**	1.0	**0.8**	0.4	1.3	**8.0**
2013	Connecticut	33	5	18.0	**55.0**	0.0	60.9	4.4	1.0	0.7	**0.9**	1.5	7.0
2014	Phoenix	34	0	14.5	50.9	0.0	66.7	3.2	0.5	0.5	0.4	0.7	4.4
2015	Phoenix	33	7	13.9	51.4	0.0	54.5	3.0	0.7	0.8	0.7	0.6	4.1
2016	Phoenix	33	1	13.2	46.3	0.0	**81.5**	1.9	0.8	0.5	0.3	0.6	2.9
Career	10 years, 4 teams	285	54	14.3	51.3	0.0	59.8	3.1	0.7	0.6	0.4	0.9	4.6

==== Playoffs ====
Year	Team	GP	GS	MPG	FG%	3P%	FT%	RPG	APG	SPG	BPG	TO	PPG
2006	Houston	2	0	4.0	50.0	0.0	0.0	0.5	0.5	0.0	0.0	0.0	1.0
2012	Connecticut	5	0	**14.0**	42.1	0.0	75.0	**3.8**	0.2	0.2	0.2	0.8	**4.4**
2014	Phoenix	**8**	0	13.0	**57.9**	0.0	50.0	2.4	0.6	0.3	**0.4**	0.3	3.4
2015	Phoenix	4	0	13.5	46.2	0.0	25.0	1.5	0.3	0.3	0.3	1.0	3.3
2016	Phoenix	5	0	7.8	33.3	0.0	**100.0**	1.4	**0.8**	0.2	0.0	0.0	1.6
Career	6 years, 3 teams	24	0	11.5	46.8	0.0	58.3	2.2	0.5	0.2	0.2	0.4	3.0
