= Allison Hightower =

American basketball player (born 1988)

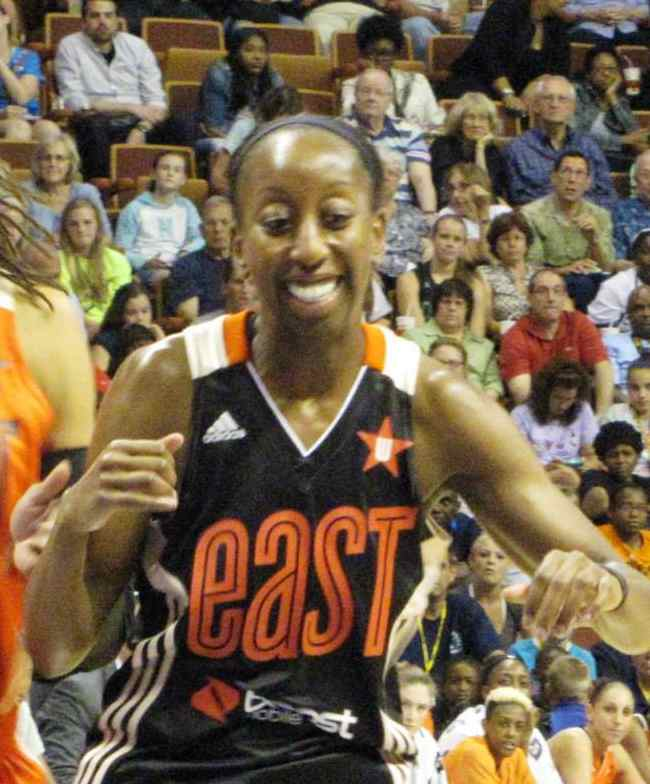

Personal information
- Born: April 6, 1988 (age 38) Dallas, Texas, U.S.
- Listed height: 5 ft 10 in (1.78 m)
- Listed weight: 139 lb (63 kg)

Career information
- High school: Seguin (Arlington, Texas)
- College: LSU (2006–2010)
- WNBA draft: 2010: 2nd round, 15th overall pick
- Drafted by: Connecticut Sun
- Playing career: 2010–present
- Position: Guard

Career history
- 2010–2014: Connecticut Sun
- 2017: Washington Mystics

Career highlights
- WNBA All-Star (2013); 2× SEC All-Defensive Team (2009, 2010); 2× First-team All-SEC (2009, 2010); SEC Sixth Player of the Year (2008); SEC All-Freshman Team (2007); McDonald's All-American (2006)
- Stats at WNBA.com
- Stats at Basketball Reference

Allison Kina Hightower (born April 6, 1988) is an American professional women's basketball player who last played for the Washington Mystics of the Women's National Basketball Association (WNBA). She was drafted 15th overall in the 2010 WNBA draft.

== High school career ==
Hightower was born in Dallas, Texas was named a WBCA All-American. She participated in the 2006 WBCA High School All-America Game, where she scored five points.

== College career ==
Hightower attended Louisiana State University, where she was named all first-team Southeastern Conference (SEC) following her senior season. She was also named SEC All-Defensive Team following her junior (2009) and senior (2010) seasons.

== College statistics ==
Legend
GP	Games played	GS	Games started	MPG	Minutes per game
FG%	Field goal percentage	3P%	3-point field goal percentage	FT%	Free throw percentage
RPG	Rebounds per game	APG	Assists per game	SPG	Steals per game
BPG	Blocks per game	PPG	Points per game	**Bold**	Career high

Year	Team	GP	Points	FG%	3P%	FT%	RPG	APG	SPG	BPG	PPG
2006–07	LSU	**38**	234	36.5%	31.8%	77.1%	2.3	1.6	0.9	0.6	6.2
2007–08	LSU	37	262	40.4%	37.4%	47.6%	2.5	1.6	0.8	0.5	7.1
2008–09	LSU	30	447	**45.7%**	18.6%	68.3%	**4.3**	**3.0**	1.9	**1.2**	14.9
2009–10	LSU	31	**565**	44.6%	**39.8%**	**75.0%**	3.5	1.9	**2.0**	0.4	**18.2**
Career		136	1508	42.6%	34.5%	70.7%	3.1	2.0	1.4	0.7	11.1

== Professional ==
Highwater played in the WNBA 2010–2014, and in 2017. She was played in the European Basketball League and in the Israel Basketball league as part of the Israeli team Elitzur Ramla and won the champion, and Maccabi Bnot Ashdod.

== Career statistics ==
Legend
GP	Games played	GS	Games started	MPG	Minutes per game	RPG	Rebounds per game
APG	Assists per game	SPG	Steals per game	BPG	Blocks per game	PPG	Points per game
TO	Turnovers per game	FG%	Field-goal percentage	3P%	3-point field-goal percentage	FT%	Free-throw percentage
**Bold**	Career best	°	League leader

=== WNBA ===
==== Regular season ====
WNBA regular season statistics
Year	Team	GP	GS	MPG	FG%	3P%	FT%	RPG	APG	SPG	BPG	TO	PPG
2010	Connecticut	20	1	10.4	.317	.167	.813	1.3	0.5	0.7	0.1	0.5	2.7
2011	Connecticut	25	2	9.2	.339	.222	.750	0.6	0.5	0.4	0.0	0.3	2.0
2012	Connecticut	**34**	**29**	24.3	.352	.237	**.914**	2.3	2.5	**1.3**	0.1	1.4	6.8
2013	Connecticut	21	21	**32.0**	**.424**	**.364**	.700	**3.1**	**3.0**	1.1	**0.3**	**1.5**	**12.8**
2014	Connecticut	14	10	23.9	.394	.222	.909	2.2	1.4	1.3	**0.3**	0.9	7.7
2015	Did not play (injury)												
2016	Did not play (injury)												
2017	Washington	11	0	13.2	.362	.200	.875	1.3	1.1	0.7	0.0	0.4	4.7
**Career**	6 years, 2 teams	125	63	19.3	.378	.264	.820	1.8	1.6	0.9	0.2	0.9	6.1
**Career**	All-Star	1	0	18.0	.429	.000	—	2.0	4.0	1.0	0.0	1.0	6.0

==== Playoffs ====
WNBA playoff statistics
Year	Team	GP	GS	MPG	FG%	3P%	FT%	RPG	APG	SPG	BPG	TO	PPG
2011	Connecticut	2	0	14.5	**.571**	**.667**	**1.000**	2.0	0.5	**1.0**	0.0	0.5	6.0
2012	Connecticut	**5**	**5**	**26.6**	.375	.300	.857	**3.8**	**3.8**	0.4	0.0	1.6	**7.8**
2017	Washington	**5**	0	9.2	.409	.200	—	1.4	0.4	0.4	0.0	**0.4**	3.8
**Career**	3 years, 2 teams	12	5	17.3	40.6	33.3	88.9	2.5	1.8	0.5	0.0	0.9	5.8
