= Kara Lawson =

American basketball player and coach (born 1981)

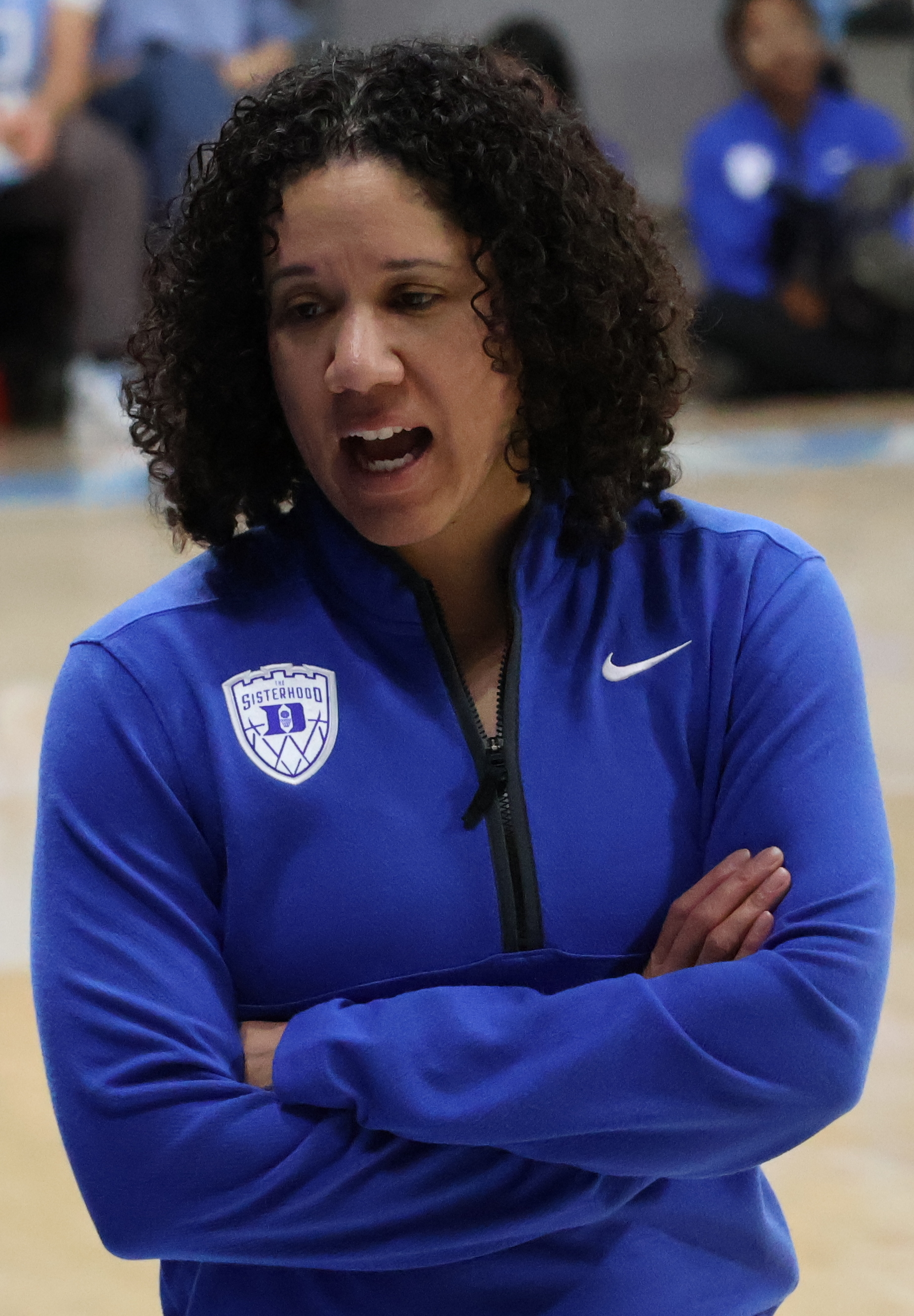
- Lawson with Duke in 2025

Duke Blue Devils
- Title: Head coach
- League: Atlantic Coast Conference

Personal information
- Born: February 14, 1981 (age 45) Alexandria, Virginia, U.S.

Career information
- High school: West Springfield (Springfield, Virginia)
- College: Tennessee (1999–2003)
- WNBA draft: 2003: 1st round, 5th overall pick
- Drafted by: Detroit Shock
- Playing career: 2003–2015
- Position: Point guard
- Number: 20
- Coaching career: 2019–present

Career history

Playing
- 2003–2009: Sacramento Monarchs
- 2010–2013: Connecticut Sun
- 2014–2015: Washington Mystics

Coaching
- 2019–2020: Boston Celtics (assistant)
- 2020–present: Duke

Career highlights
- As player: WNBA champion (2005); WNBA All-Star (2007); 2× Kim Perrot Sportsmanship Award (2009, 2012); Dawn Staley Community Leadership Award (2013); Frances Pomeroy Naismith Award (2003); 2× All-American – USBWA (2002, 2003); Kodak All-American (2003); Second-team All-American – AP (2003); Third-team All-American – AP (2002); 4× First-team All-SEC (2000–2003); SEC All-Freshman Team (2000); Naismith Prep Player of the Year (1999); As coach: 2× ACC Tournament Champion (2025, 2026); ACC regular season (2026); ACC Coach of the Year (2026)
- Stats at WNBA.com
- Stats at Basketball Reference
Medals
Women's basketball
Representing the United States
World University Games
Gold medal – first place	2001 Beijing	Team competition
Olympic Games
Gold medal – first place	2008 Beijing	Team competition
Head coach for the United States
AmeriCup
Gold medal – first place	2025 Chile	Team competition
World Cup
Gold medal – first place	2026 Germany	Team competition
Assistant coach for the United States
World Cup
Gold medal – first place	2022 Australia	Team competition
Olympic Games
Gold medal – first place	2024 Paris	Team competition
Women's 3x3 basketball
Head coach for the United States
Olympic Games
Gold medal – first place	2020 Tokyo	Team competition

Kara Marie Lawson (born February 14, 1981) is an American basketball coach and former player who is the head coach for the Duke Blue Devils women's basketball team and the U.S. women's national team. She played professionally in the Women's National Basketball Association (WNBA) and has also been a basketball television analyst for ESPN and the Washington Wizards. Lawson primarily played as a shooting guard. She won a gold medal at the 2008 Olympics in Beijing, China, a championship with the Sacramento Monarchs in the 2005 WNBA Finals, and coached the United States women's national 3x3 team to gold in the 2020 Summer Olympics. Lawson retired from the WNBA in 2015 to focus on her broadcasting career. She began her coaching career as an assistant coach for the Boston Celtics of the NBA in 2019.

== Early life and education ==
Kara Lawson was born in Alexandria, Virginia, to parents William and Kathleen Lawson. She has two sisters, Susan and Mary Katherine.

Lawson attended Sidwell Friends School her freshman year, then went to West Springfield High School, where she played on the girls' basketball and soccer teams.

== Playing career ==
=== High school ===
Lawson was named a WBCA All-American in 1999. Her high school record was 83–2 and won two state championships in her sophomore and senior years with a perfect 30–0 record. She participated in the 1999 WBCA High School All-America Game, where she scored twenty points, and earned MVP honors.

=== College career ===
Lawson attended the University of Tennessee (UT) and played for the Lady Vols basketball team, coached by Pat Summitt. She enrolled in UT's College of Business, and graduated in 2003 with a degree in finance. Lawson received the Frances Pomeroy Naismith Award from the Women's Basketball Coaches Association as the best senior player under 5 ft 8 in (1.7 m). In 2018, Tennessee Governor Bill Haslam named Lawson to the board of trustees of the University of Tennessee, the governing body of the UT system. In 2003, Lawson was named an Arthur Ashe Jr. Sports Scholar by Diverse: Issues In Higher Education.

=== WNBA ===
On April 24, 2003, Lawson was selected as the fifth overall pick by the Detroit Shock in the first round of the 2003 WNBA draft. But five days later, the Shock traded Lawson to the Sacramento Monarchs in exchange for Kedra Holland-Corn and a 2004 second-round draft pick. Two years later, Lawson would be a key member of the Monarchs 2005 championship team.

Lawson was a free agent when the Sacramento Monarchs folded prior to the 2010 WNBA season, but later signed a three-year contract with the Connecticut Sun. On March 12, 2014, Lawson was traded to the Washington Mystics for Alex Bentley, who was originally traded to Washington through the Atlanta Dream.

=== US national team ===
Lawson was selected to be a member of the United States national team at the 2001 World University Games held in Beijing, China. After winning the opening game easily, the USA team faced Canada and lost a close game 68–67. Needing a win to remain in medal contention, Lawson scored 25 points to help the USA team defeat Japan, and earn a spot in the quarterfinals. The USA team fell behind by 12 points against undefeated Russia, but came back to win the game by eleven points. The next game was against the unbeaten host team China, and the USA team won 89–78. The USA team won their next two games to set up the gold medal game; a rematch against the host team. China would stay close early, but the USA team prevailed and won the gold medal with a score of 87–67. Lawson was the third leading scorer on the team with 12.0 points per game and led the team in assists and steal with 16 assists and 12 steals over the course of the event.

On July 10, 2008, Lawson was selected to represent the United States with the USA women's national basketball team at the 2008 Summer Olympics in Beijing, China. She helped the United States capture the gold medal, and led the team in points (15) during the gold medal game against Australia, going a perfect 5-5 from the field and 4-4 from the free throw line.

Lawson was invited to the USA Basketball Women's National Team training camp in the fall of 2009. The team selected to play for the 2010 FIBA World Championship and the 2012 Olympics was chosen from these participants. Lawson was one of 21 finalists for the U.S. Women's Olympic Basketball Team Roster. The 20 professional women's basketball players, plus one collegiate player (Brittney Griner), were selected by the USA Basketball Women's National Team Player Selection Committee to compete for the final roster to represent the US at the 2012 Olympics in London, United Kingdom. However, Lawson did not make the final roster.

== Playing statistics ==
Legend
GP	Games played	GS	Games started	MPG	Minutes per game	RPG	Rebounds per game
APG	Assists per game	SPG	Steals per game	BPG	Blocks per game	PPG	Points per game
TO	Turnovers per game	FG%	Field-goal percentage	3P%	3-point field-goal percentage	FT%	Free-throw percentage
**Bold**	Career best	°	League leader

=== College ===
Year	Team	GP	Points	FG%	3P%	FT%	RPG	APG	SPG	BPG	PPG
1999-00	Tennessee	37	504	45.8	43.6	81.7	4.1	2.8	1.4	**0.2**	13.6
2000-01	Tennessee	34	386	43.3	41.3	85.7	3.5	3.3	1.0	0.1	11.4
2001-02	Tennessee	34	512	46.6	33.0	83.5	**4.9**	2.6	**1.4**	0.1	**15.1**
2002-03	Tennessee	**38**	**548**	**46.9**	**45.0**	**88.4**	**4.9**	**4.0**	1.1	**0.2**	14.4
Career	Tennessee	143	1950	45.8	41.5	84.7	4.3	3.2	1.2	0.1	13.6

=== WNBA ===
†	Denotes seasons in which Lawson won a WNBA championship

==== Regular season ====
Year	Team	GP	GS	MPG	FG%	3P%	FT%	RPG	APG	SPG	BPG	TO	PPG
2003	Sacramento	**34**	0	22.6	.392	.400	.775	3.1	1.6	0.4	0.1	1.2	7.7
2004	Sacramento	**34**	10	24.3	.420	.381	.841	2.3	2.0	0.6	**0.2**	1.6	8.6
2005^{†}	Sacramento	24	1	21.2	.439	.444	.839	1.4	1.5	0.5	0.1	**0.9**	8.0
2006	Sacramento	**34**	6	22.1	.397	.398	.923	1.9	1.6	0.6	0.1	1.3	8.1
2007	Sacramento	**34**	0	22.8	.376	.338	.841	2.4	2.0	**0.9**	**0.2**	1.4	11.0
2008	Sacramento	32	32	25.9	.405	.432	.914	2.6	2.1	**0.9**	0.1	1.5	12.2
2009	Sacramento	25	5	24.2	.380	.336	**.939**	2.1	2.5	0.6	0.0	1.4	8.8
2010	Connecticut	**34**	32	25.1	.409	.359	.895	2.6	3.5	0.4	0.0	1.4	8.3
2011	Connecticut	33	8	25.2	.449	.430	.890	2.6	2.9	0.7	0.0	1.4	10.4
2012	Connecticut	**34**	**34**	**31.4**	**.493**	.430	.935	**3.9**	4.0	0.8	0.1	1.8	**15.1**
2013	Connecticut	9	6	30.1	.437	**.458**	.857	3.7	**4.2**	0.6	0.1	2.4	13.8
2014	Washington	28	4	21.8	.379	.337	.935	2.9	2.5	0.3	0.0	1.3	7.0
2015	Washington	22	21	25.0	.389	.321	.938	3.0	3.6	0.6	0.1	1.1	9.6
Career	13 years, 3 teams	377	159	24.5	.414	.390	.890	2.6	2.5	0.6	0.1	1.4	9.8

==== Playoffs ====
Year	Team	GP	GS	MPG	FG%	3P%	FT%	RPG	APG	SPG	BPG	TO	PPG
2003	Sacramento	6	0	25.7	.214	.304	.875	3.8	2.7	0.2	0.3	**0.7**	5.3
2004	Sacramento	6	0	25.5	.370	.417	.889	2.5	1.8	**1.3**	0.2	0.8	9.7
2005^{†}	Sacramento	8	2	26.0	.433	.517	.944	3.6	2.3	1.0	0.1	1.4	11.3
2006	Sacramento	**9**	**9**	32.1	.448	.438	.786	3.4	1.6	1.0	0.1	1.3	12.2
2007	Sacramento	3	0	25.0	.500	.385	.857	2.3	3.0	1.0	**0.7**	**0.7**	12.3
2008	Sacramento	3	3	27.0	.478	.375	.800	**5.0**	**4.3**	0.7	0.0	2.3	9.7
2011	Connecticut	2	0	18.5	.400	.571	.750	0.5	3.5	0.0	0.0	1.5	7.5
2012	Connecticut	5	5	**35.0**	.442	.433	**1.000**	4.8	3.8	1.2	0.2	1.8	**14.6**
2014	Washington	2	0	26.0	**.526**	.444	**1.000**	3.0	3.5	0.5	0.0	1.5	14.5
2015	Washington	3	0	16.7	.353	**.750**	**1.000**	1.3	0.7	0.3	0.0	1.7	6.0
Career	10 years, 3 teams	47	19	27.1	.413	.436	.897	3.3	2.5	0.8	0.2	1.3	10.4

== Broadcasting career ==
Lawson began her broadcasting career while still playing in the WNBA. She served as a studio analyst for the Sacramento Kings, and worked her way up to working in a variety of NBA and WNBA broadcast roles for ESPN. On January 12, 2007, she was the first woman to work as a nationwide broadcast analyst for an NBA game, when the New Orleans Hornets took on the Washington Wizards.

In 2017, Lawson was named the primary television game analyst for the Washington Wizards, replacing longtime analyst Phil Chenier as full-time host. She is one of the first primary female TV analysts for an NBA team, joining Sarah Kustok of the Brooklyn Nets.

In 2021, Lawson was a commentator for women's basketball at the 2020 Summer Olympics.

== Coaching career ==
On June 27, 2019, the Boston Celtics of the National Basketball Association (NBA) announced that Lawson would join the team as an assistant coach. During her tenure as assistant coach in the 2019–20 season, Lawson worked closely with Marcus Smart, a defensive-minded point guard, as a shooting coach.

On July 11, 2020, it was announced that Lawson was hired as the head coach of the Duke Blue Devils women's basketball team. She brought on Winston Gandy, Tia Jackson, and Beth Cunningham as assistant coaches. Her first season as head coach lasted four games after the decision to end the season in late December 2020 due to concerns over the COVID-19 pandemic.

In the 2020 Summer Olympics, Lawson coached the USA team to a gold medal in the 3x3 basketball, defeating China 18–15 in the title match. In February 2024, she was announced as the assistant coach for the USA Women's Olympic Basketball Team. In September 2025, it was announced that she would be the head coach of Team USA through 2028.

Lawson credits Pat Summitt with teaching her how to hold players accountable as a coach.

== Head coaching record ==
=== College ===
Record table
Season	Team	Overall	Conference	Standing	Postseason
Duke Blue Devils (Atlantic Coast Conference) (2020–present)
2020–21	Duke	3–1	0–1	N/A	Opted out due to COVID-19
2021–22	Duke	17–13	7–11	10th	
2022–23	Duke	26–7	14–4	T–2nd	NCAA Second Round
2023–24	Duke	22–12	11–7	T–7th	NCAA Sweet Sixteen
2024–25	Duke	29–8	14–4	3rd	NCAA Elite Eight
2025–26	Duke	27–9	16–2	1st	NCAA Elite Eight
2026–27	Duke	0–0	0–0		
Duke:		124–50 (.713)	62–29 (.681)		
Total:		124–50 (.713)			
National champion Postseason invitational champion Conference regular season champion Conference regular season and conference tournament champion Division regular season champion Division regular season and conference tournament champion Conference tournament champion

=== International ===
Team	Year	G	W	L	W–L%	Tournament	TG	TW	TL	TW–L%	Result
United States	2025	7	7	0	1.000	AmeriCup	7	7	0	1.000	Won gold medal
United States	2026	11	11	0	1.000	World Cup	6	6	0	1.000	Won gold medal
Career		18	18	0	1.000		13	13	0	1.000	

== Personal life ==
Lawson married multimedia journalist Damien Barling in 2008.

She actively participates in the Race for the Cure breast cancer organization and the American Cancer Society.
