= Tina Charles (basketball) =

American basketball player (born 1988)

- Charles with the Fenerbahçe in 2025

Personal information
- Born: December 5, 1988 (age 37) New York City, New York, U.S.
- Listed height: 6 ft 4 in (1.93 m)
- Listed weight: 192 lb (87 kg)

Career information
- High school: Christ the King (Queens, New York)
- College: UConn (2006–2010)
- WNBA draft: 2010: 1st round, 1st overall pick
- Drafted by: Connecticut Sun
- Playing career: 2010–2026
- Position: Center

Career history
- 2010–2013: Connecticut Sun
- 2011–2012: Galatasaray Medical Park
- 2012–2014: Wisła Can-Pack Kraków
- 2014–2019: New York Liberty
- 2014–2015: Fenerbahçe
- 2015–2016: Xinjiang Magic Deer
- 2016–2018: Sichuan Whales
- 2019: Beijing Great Wall
- 2021: Washington Mystics
- 2022: Phoenix Mercury
- 2022: Seattle Storm
- 2023–2024: Hebei Win Power
- 2024: Atlanta Dream
- 2024–2025: Fenerbahçe
- 2025: Connecticut Sun
- 2026: Athletes Unlimited

Career highlights
- WNBA MVP (2012); WNBA Rookie of the Year (2010); 8× WNBA All-Star (2011, 2013–2015, 2017–2019, 2021); 5× All-WNBA First Team (2011, 2012, 2015–2017); 4× All-WNBA Second Team (2010, 2013, 2014, 2021); WNBA All-Defensive First Team (2017); 2× WNBA All-Defensive Second Team (2011, 2012, 2015); WNBA 25th Anniversary Team (2021); 4× WNBA rebounding champion (2010–2012, 2016); 2× WNBA scoring champion (2016, 2021); 4× WNBA Peak Performer (2010–2012, 2016); 2× Dawn Staley Community Leadership Award (2012, 2025); No. 31 retired by Connecticut Sun; FIBA Europe SuperCup Women champion (2024); Turkish Super League champion (2025); 2× Turkish Cup winner (2012, 2015); 2× Turkish Presidential Cup champion (2015, 2024); Polish National League champion (2014); Polish Cup winner (2014); 2× NCAA champion (2009, 2010); NCAA Tournament MOP (2009); AP Player of the Year (2010); John R. Wooden Award (2010); Naismith College Player of the Year (2010); USBWA National Player of the Year (2010); Big East Player of the Year (2010); First-team All-American – AP (2010); All-American – USBWA (2010); USA Basketball Female Athlete of the Year (2009); Second-team All-American – AP (2009); Third-team All-American – AP (2008); 3× First-team All-Big East (2008–2010); USBWA National Freshman of the Year (2007); Big East Freshman of the Year (2007); Big East All-Freshman Team (2007); WBCA National Player of the Year (2006); USA Today National Player of the Year (2006); McDonald's All-American (2006); Morgan Wootten Player of the Year (2006); Gatorade Female Athlete of the Year (2006); Gatorade National Player of the Year (2006); Miss New York Basketball (2006)

Career WNBA statistics
- Points: 8,396 (17.8 ppg)
- Rebounds: 4,262 (9.0 rpg)
- Assists: 1,033 (2.2 apg)
- Stats at WNBA.com
- Stats at Basketball Reference
Medals
Women's basketball
Representing United States
Olympic Games
Gold medal – first place	2012 London	Team
Gold medal – first place	2016 Rio de Janeiro	Team
Gold medal – first place	2020 Tokyo	Team
World Cup
Gold medal – first place	2010 Czech Republic
Gold medal – first place	2014 Turkey
Gold medal – first place	2018 Spain
FIBA AmeriCup
Gold medal – first place	2019 Puerto Rico	Team
World University Games
Gold medal – first place	2009 Belgrade	Team
FIBA Under-18 Americas Championship
Gold medal – first place	2006 United States	Team

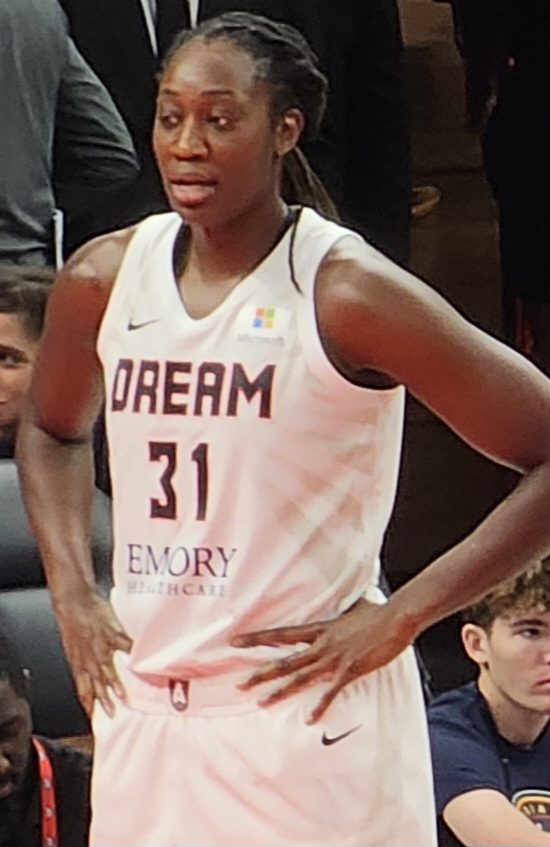
Charles with the Atlanta Dream in 2024

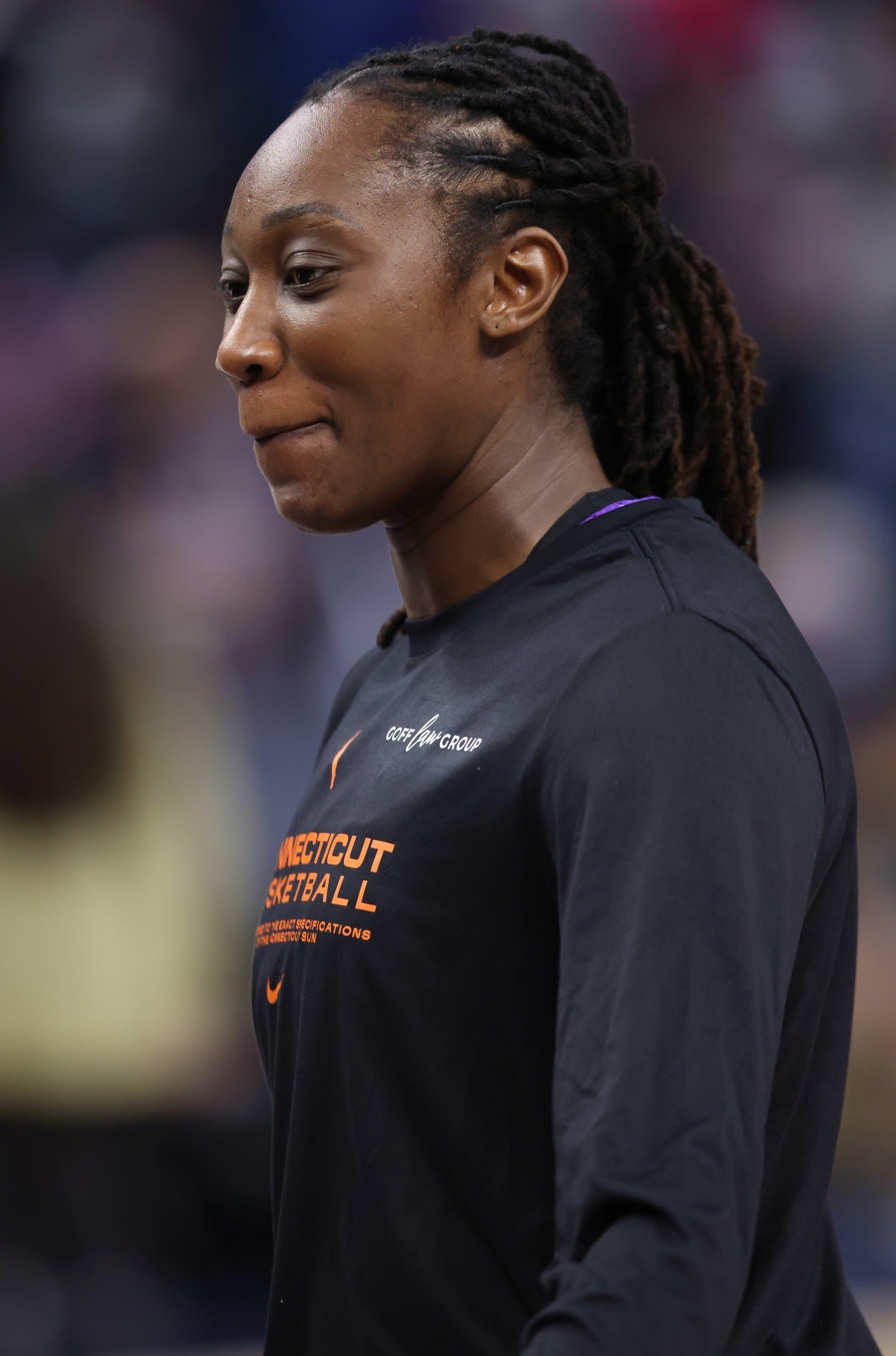
Charles with the Connecticut Sun in 2025

Tina Alexandria Charles (born December 5, 1988) is an American former professional basketball player. Originally from Jamaica, Queens, New York City, Charles was drafted first overall in the 2010 WNBA draft by the Connecticut Sun. In 2009 and 2010, she and teammate Maya Moore led the Connecticut Huskies to two undefeated national championships. She has won three Olympic gold medals with Team USA and was inducted into the NYC Basketball Hall of Fame at the head of the Class of 2024 - the first female to head a class at any major basketball hall of fame and the first active player ever inducted.

Charles is considered by many to be the best player in WNBA history not to have appeared in the Finals. Charles became the second all time scorer in WNBA history on August 21, 2024.

== Early life ==
Charles played basketball at Christ the King High School in Middle Village, New York. After averaging 26.5 points, 14.8 rebounds and 5.2 blocked shots per game her senior year, she was named WBCA National Player of the Year, "Miss Basketball" for New York state, and was selected as a McDonald's All-American and tabbed New York City Player of the Year by Newsday, the Daily News and the New York Post. Charles was the leading scorer on the Christ the King team that won 57 consecutive games, leading to a USA Today #1 ranking in the country after an undefeated season in 2006. Charles was named a WBCA All-American. She participated in the 2006 WBCA High School All-America Game, where she scored fifteen points and had twelve rebounds. Charles was named the MVP of the Red team. During high school, Charles also played on the AAU club basketball team the New York Gazelles.

== College career ==
In 2009, Charles led the UConn Huskies to a national title as a junior. She was named Final Four MOP and one of the 10 players on the State Farm All-America team during Final Four weekend. Charles made a comment to ESPN during a post-championship interview, in regards to the tradition of sports champions who visit the White House after their title game victories. She said, "Barack Obama, we will be here soon!" and after the 2010 championship she made a comment, "President Barack Obama, we're back!"

On February 13, 2010, before the game vs. St. John's, Charles became the 12th UConn Women's basketball player to be recognized in the Huskies of Honor and was the 2nd player to be honored while still a player. The first was Renee Montgomery the year before.

On March 1, 2010, during a game against Notre Dame, Charles broke two UConn records on the same night. Her fifth rebound made her the all-time leading rebounder at UConn, surpassing Rebecca Lobo's fifteen-year-old record of 1268. Lobo was present working as a commentator for ESPN, and interviewed Charles after the game. Additionally, Charles started the night in third place in career scoring, behind Kerry Bascom and Nykesha Sales. Sales had scored 2,178 points and Bascom 2,177 in their careers. During the game, Charles surpassed both to become the leading scorer in UConn history.

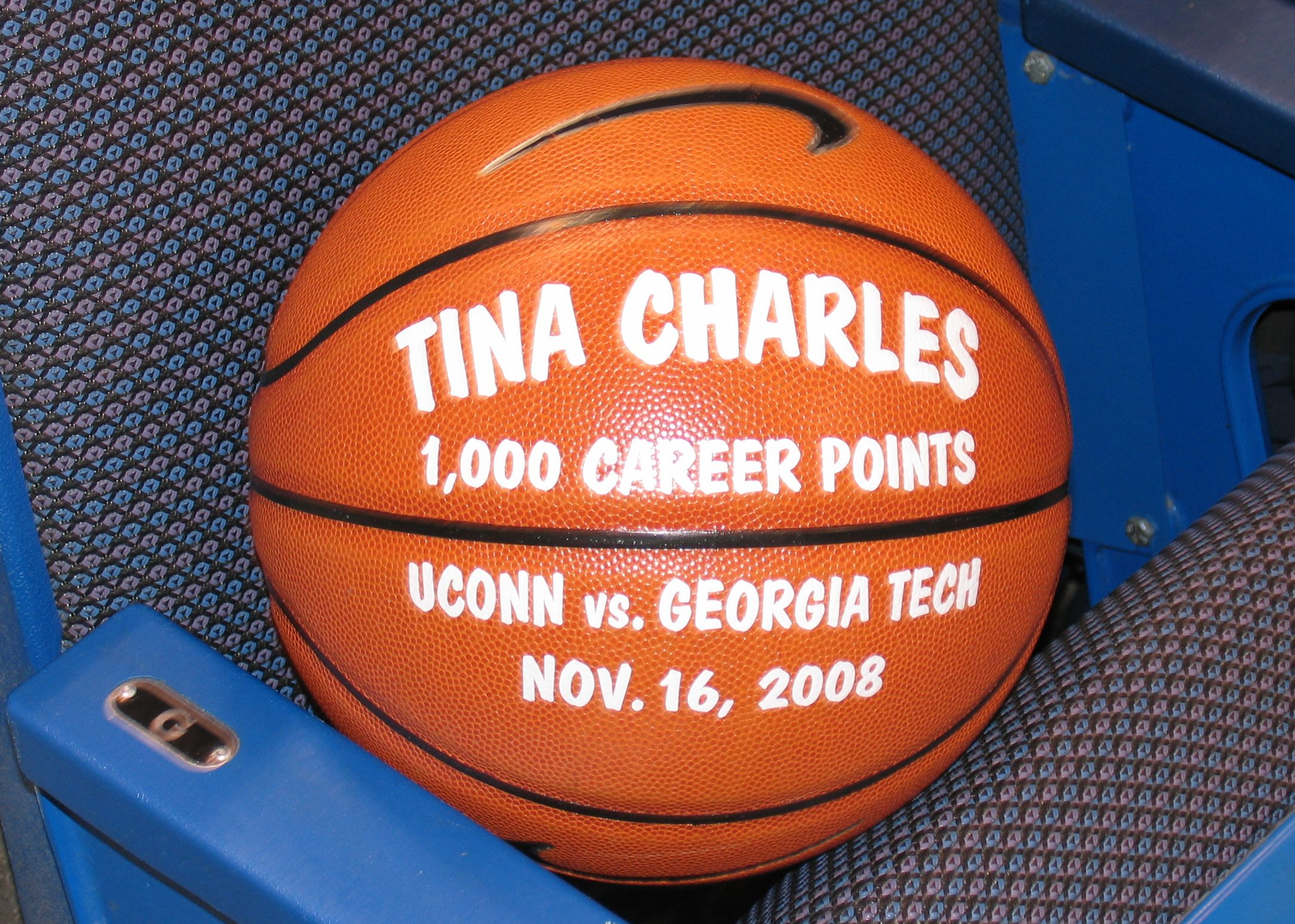
Commemorative Ball for 1000 points

Charles was named the Big East Conference Player of the Year for 2010.

Charles majored in psychology with a minor in criminal justice. She anticipates working in corrections at the close of her basketball career. In 2010, she spent six hours a week as an intern at Bergin Correctional Institution, helping prisoners adjust back to life in society.

== WNBA career ==
=== Connecticut Sun (2010–2013) ===
Charles was the overall #1 pick in the 2010 WNBA draft, selected by the Connecticut Sun.

Charles was named the 2010 WNBA Rookie of the Year. In her first season, she set all-time league records for rebounds, with 398, and double-doubles with 22 (both scoring and rebounds in double digits).

On September 2, 2011, Tina Charles had 10 points, 10 assists and 16 rebounds for the first triple-double in Connecticut Sun history, and only the fifth such accomplishment in WNBA history. Charles had eight assists at halftime, and was taken out of the game with nine, because the lead over the opponent was so large. The coach did put her back in the game in the fourth quarter, and she earned an assist on a pass to Jessica Moore, leading to the triple double. However, subsequent review by the league resulted in a change, as three of the assists should not have been credited to Charles, so she ended the game with seven assists, not ten.

On August 18, 2012, Charles recorded nine rebounds in an 85–74 win over the Liberty. One of the rebounds in the second quarter pushed her career total to 1,000. She accomplished this milestone faster than any other WNBA player in history. She reached 1,000 rebounds in her 89th game, surpassing the record formerly held by Yolanda Griffith, who reached 1,000 rebounds in her 92nd game.

Charles was named the 2012 MVP of the WNBA, winning 25 of 41 first place votes. She led the league in the number of double-doubles recorded, and set the mark for the fastest player in WNBA history to reach 900, 1,000 and 1,100 rebounds.

=== New York Liberty (2014–2019) ===
In the weeks leading up to the 2014 WNBA draft, rumors had circulated that Charles could be traded before the draft, so the Sun could obtain more draft picks. Just before the Draft, Charles was traded to her native team the New York Liberty in exchange for Kelsey Bone, the fourth overall pick in the 2014 WNBA draft (Alyssa Thomas) and the fourth overall pick in the 2015 WNBA draft (Elizabeth Williams).

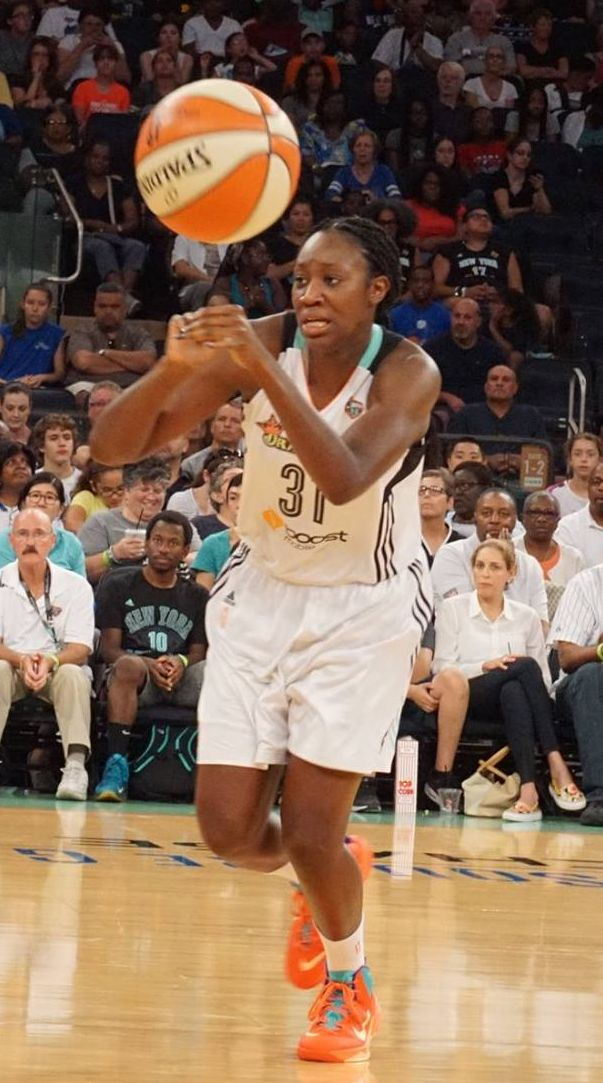
Charles with the New York Liberty in 2015

In 2016, Charles had the best season of her career, averaging a career-high 21.5 points per game while shooting 43.9% from the field and 81.2% from the free-throw line. Charles had also led the league in rebounds with 9.9 rebounds per game, winning her fourth rebounding title. Her scoring average was tied with Elena Delle Donne but led the league in total points scored which allowed her to claim the scoring title. The Liberty finished with a 21–13 record. With the WNBA's new playoff format in effect, the Liberty were the number 3 seed in the league with a bye to the second round with one elimination game to play where they were defeated by the Phoenix Mercury.

In 2017, Charles would be voted into the 2017 WNBA All-Star Game making it her fifth career all-star game appearance. On June 2, 2017, Charles scored a career-high 36 points in a 93–89 win over the Dallas Wings. The Liberty would once again finish with number 3 seed in the league, receiving a bye to the second round elimination game. The Liberty would lose yet again in the second round by a final score of 82–69 to the Washington Mystics.

In 2018, Charles re-signed with the Liberty. In 2018, Charles would be voted into the 2018 WNBA All-Star Game for her sixth all-star game appearance. The Liberty would miss out on the playoffs for the first time in 4 years as they finished 7–27.

On June 4, 2019, Charles became the Liberty's all-time scoring leader after a late-fourth quarter layup in a 78–73 loss to the Los Angeles Sparks. She finished the game with 21 points and 14 rebounds.

=== Washington Mystics (2021) ===
On April 15, 2020, Charles was traded to the Washington Mystics. Charles was medically excused for the shortened 2020 season on July 17, 2020, due to her condition with extrinsic asthma, which impacts her immune system and put her at risk in the coronavirus pandemic.

Since 2013, Charles has donated her full WNBA salary to the charity she started, Hopey's Heart Foundation. In 2020, Charles announced she would direct that year's salary to support the Black Lives Matter movement. After two seasons with the Mystics - one sitting out in 2020 - Charles and the Mystics did not re-sign with each other during the 2022 offseason.

=== Phoenix Mercury (2022) ===
On February 4, 2022, Charles signed with the Phoenix Mercury. Charles joined the Mercury in hopes of winning a title, but the team struggled and wasn't in title contention through the first 18 games of the 2022 season. On June 25, 2022, Charles and the Mercury agreed to a buyout from her contract - officially ending her time in Phoenix. Charles appeared in 16 games for the Mercury and averaged 17.3 points.

=== Seattle Storm (2022) ===
Charles signed with the Seattle Storm on June 28, 2022.

=== Atlanta Dream (2024) ===
Charles signed with the Atlanta Dream on February 1, 2024 after not being signed to a team for the 2023 season.

=== Return to Connecticut (2025) ===
On February 2, 2025, Charles signed as a free agent with the Connecticut Sun, returning to the team that drafted her 15 years before.

== Athletes Unlimited ==
In 2026, Charles joined Athletes Unlimited Pro Basketball for its fifth season, adding to her professional résumé following an extensive WNBA and international career.

On May 5, 2026, Charles officially announced her retirement.

== Overseas ==
In the 2011–12 off-season, Charles played in Turkey for Galatasaray. From 2012 to 2014, Charles played two off-seasons in Poland for Wisła Can-Pack Kraków. In the 2014–15 off-season, Charles played in Turkey once again for Fenerbahçe. In the 2015–16 off-season, Charles played in China for the Xinjiang Tianshan Deers. As of November 2016, Charles had signed with the Sichuan Whales for the 2016–17 off-season. In 2017, Charles had re-signed with the Sichuan Whales for the 2017–18 off-season.

Charles played for Fenerbahçe in the 2024–2025 season.

== USA Basketball ==
Charles was a member of the USA Women's U18 team which won the gold medal at the FIBA Americas Championship in Colorado Springs, Colorado. The event was held in July 2006, when the USA team defeated Canada to win the championship. Charles helped set the tone in the opening game against Paraguay, recording a double-double with 20 points and 10 rebounds. In the gold medal game, she had her second double-double of the tournament with 13 points and 13 rebounds. She was the leading scorer on her team with 12 points per games, as well as the leading rebounder, with 9.5 per game.

Charles was invited to the USA Basketball Women's National Team training camp in the fall of 2009, one of only three college players invited to the training camp. The team selected to play for the 2010 FIBA World Championship and the 2012 Olympics is usually chosen from these participants.

Charles was named a member of the team representing the US at the 2009 World University Games held in Belgrade, Serbia. The team won all seven games to earn the gold medal. Charles was the team's leading scorer and rebounder, with 16.1 points per game and 8.1 rebounds per game. In the gold medal game against previously undefeated Russia, she had 28 points and 18 rebounds.

On October 5, 2009, Charles was selected to be one of the USA National Team members to travel to the 2009 Ekaterinburg International Invitational. She was the only college player on the team. Charles contributed to the USA Basketball win at the Ekaterinburg Tournament. She had double-digit scoring in all three games, with the second game, against Euroleasing Sopron, her best result, scoring 15 points in only 13 minutes of play.

Charles was named the USA Basketball 2009 Female Athlete Of The Year, for her contributions to the Gold Medal earned at the 2009 USA Women's World University Games, the Gold Medal earned at the 2009 Ekaterinburg International Invitational, and the undefeated collegiate season leading to a National Championship.

Charles was named as one of the National team members to represent the USA Basketball team in the WNBA versus USA Basketball. This game replaces the normal WNBA All-Star game with WNBA All-Stars versus USA Basketball, as part of the preparation for the FIBA World Championship for Women to be held in the Czech Republic during September and October 2010.

Charles was selected to be a member of the National team representing the US at the World Championships held in September and October 2010. The team was coached by Geno Auriemma. Because many team members were still playing in the WNBA until just prior to the event, the team had only one day of practice with the entire team before leaving for Ostrava and Karlovy Vary, Czech Republic. Even with limited practice, the team managed to win its first games against Greece by 26 points. The team continued to dominate with victory margins exceeding 20 points in the first five games. Several players shared scoring honors, with Swin Cash, Angel McCoughtry, Maya Moore, Diana Taurasi, Lindsay Whalen, and Sylvia Fowles all ending as high scorer in the first few games. The sixth game was against undefeated Australia — the USA jumped out to a 24-point lead and the USA prevailed 83–75. The USA won its next two games by over 30 points, then faced the host team, the Czech Republic, in the championship game. The USA team had only a five-point lead at halftime, which was cut to three points, but the Czechs never got closer. Team USA went on to win the championship and gold medal. Charles averaged 10.7 points per game, third best on the team and was the second leading rebounder with 4.8 per game.

Charles played for Team USA at the 2012 Summer Olympics in London. Charles would earn her first Olympic gold medal as they beat France 86–50 for the gold medal.

Charles played for Team USA during the 2016 Summer Olympics, helping them win their sixth gold medal as they defeated Spain 101–72. Charles would earn her second Olympic gold medal.

== Career statistics ==
Legend
GP	Games played	GS	Games started	MPG	Minutes per game	RPG	Rebounds per game
APG	Assists per game	SPG	Steals per game	BPG	Blocks per game	PPG	Points per game
TO	Turnovers per game	FG%	Field-goal percentage	3P%	3-point field-goal percentage	FT%	Free-throw percentage
**Bold**	Career best	°	League leader

=== WNBA ===
==== Regular season ====
Stats current through end of 2025 season

WNBA regular season statistics
Year	Team	GP	GS	MPG	FG%	3P%	FT%	RPG	APG	SPG	BPG	TO	PPG
2010	Connecticut	34	34	31.0	.487	.000	.763	**11.7**°	1.5	0.7	1.7	2.1	15.5
2011	Connecticut	34	34	33.4	.468	.000	.687	11.0°	1.9	0.8	**1.8**	2.2	17.6
2012	Connecticut	33	33	33.2	**.499**	.200	.802	10.5°	1.7	0.5	1.4	2.2	18.0
2013	Connecticut	29	29	32.8	.400	.000	.752	10.1	1.4	0.9	0.9	2.2	18.0
2014	New York	34	34	32.9	.462	—	.752	9.4	2.2	**1.2**	0.8	2.3	17.4
2015	New York	34	34	31.0	.458	.200	.715	8.5	2.4	0.7	0.6	2.4	17.4
2016	New York	32	32	**33.7**	.439	.347	.812	9.9°	**3.8**	0.8	0.7	2.0	21.5°
2017	New York	34	34	32.2	.442	.348	.804	9.4	2.6	0.8	0.7	2.4	19.7
2018	New York	33	33	33.0	.473	.326	.770	7.0	2.7	0.7	0.6	2.8	19.7
2019	New York	33	33	31.2	.389	.186	.812	7.5	2.4	0.7	0.9	2.6	16.9
2020	Did not play (medically excused)												
2021	Washington	27	27	33.3	.449	**.365**	.820	9.6	2.1	0.9	0.9	2.2	**23.4**°
2022	Phoenix	16	16	33.1	.441	.364	.800	7.3	2.1	0.8	0.8	2.4	17.3
2022	Seattle	18	10	25.2	.477	.341	**.885**	7.4	1.8	0.6	0.6	1.9	12.6
2023	Did not play												
2024	Atlanta	39	39	29.7	.456	.262	.785	9.6	2.3	0.9	0.5	**1.6**	14.9
2025	Connecticut	**43**	**42**	28.4	.438	.261	.857	5.8	1.7	0.8	0.4	1.9	16.3
**Career**	14 years, 6 teams	473	464	31.6	.450	.316	.784	9.0	2.2	0.8	0.9	2.2	17.8
**Career**	All-Star	8	4	17.6	.468	.227	.571	4.3	0.9	0.5	0.1	0.4	10.1

==== Playoffs ====
WNBA playoff statistics
Year	Team	GP	GS	MPG	FG%	3P%	FT%	RPG	APG	SPG	BPG	TO	PPG
2011	Connecticut	2	2	36.0	.313	—	.625	**12.0**°	2.0	**1.0**	2.5°	2.0	12.5
2012	Connecticut	5	5	36.0	.469	**.500**	696	10.0	1.0	0.8	**2.6**°	1.8	18.6
2015	New York	**6**	**6**	**38.3**	.434	**.500**	.789	8.7	4.0	0.1	0.6	2.0	**20.3**
2016	New York	1	1	36.4	.417	.333	**1.000**	9.0	**5.0**	**1.0**	0.0	**1.0**	19.0
2017	New York	1	1	36.2	.471	**.500**	.500	6.0	1.0	0.0	0.0	2.0	18.0
2022	Seattle	**6**	**6**	26.2	.431	.231	.286	8.8	1.8	0.5	0.5	1.3	11.5
2024	Atlanta	2	2	29.0	**.522**	—	.667	6.5	1.5	0.0	0.0	**1.0**	13.0
**Career**	7 years, 4 teams	23	23	33.4	.437	.318	.662	9.0	2.3	0.5	1.1	1.7	16.2

=== College ===
NCAA statistics at University of Connecticut
Year	G	FG	FGA	PCT	3FG	3FGA	PCT	FT	FTA	PCT	REB	AVG	A	TO	B	S	MIN	PTS	AVG
2006–07	36	190	322	0.590	0	0	0.000	76	128	0.594	296	8.2	30	67	81	13	827	456	12.7
2007–08	38	220	364	0.604	0	0	0.000	100	173	0.578	351	9.2	49	75	68	28	982	540	14.2
2008–09	39	259	418	0.620	0	0	0.000	124	182	0.681	348	8.9	41	74	32	35	982	642	16.5
2009–10	39	299	484	0.618	0	1	0.000	110	161	0.683	372	9.5	60	87	63	87	1078	708	18.2
Totals	152	968	1588	0.610	0	1	0.000	410	644	0.637	1367	9.0	180	303	244	163	3869	2346	15.4

== Awards and honors ==
- 2006 USA Today National Player of the Year
- 2006 McDonald's National Player of the Year
- 2006 Parade Magazine National Player of the Year
- 2006 Gatorade National Player of the Year
- 2006 WBCA National Player of the Year
- 2006 EA Sports National Player of the Year
- 2006 Miss New York Basketball
- 2007 Big East Freshman of the Year
- 2009 USA Basketball Female Athlete of the Year
- 2010 All-BIG EAST First Team (unanimous)
- 2010 Big East Player of the Year
- 2010 AP All-America First Team
- 2010 U.S. Basketball Writers Association's Player of the Year.
- 2010 State Farm Coaches' All-America Team
- 2010 #1 selection in 2010 WNBA draft
- 2010 John R. Wooden Award winner
- 2010 WNBA Rookie of the Year
- 2010 All-WNBA Second Team
- 2012 WNBA MVP
- 2024 NYC Basketball Hall of Fame Class of 2024

== Personal life ==
Charles is a Christian. She has established a foundation, named Hopey's Heart Foundation, to distribute Automated External Defibrillators (AED) to schools. She has also funded a school in Mali. In 2018, she was awarded the Mannie Jackson Basketball's Human Spirit Award for her work on education and heart health.

== See also ==
- List of WNBA career rebounding leaders
- Connecticut Huskies women's basketball
- List of Connecticut Huskies women's basketball players with 1000 points
- List of Connecticut Huskies women's basketball players with 1000 rebounds
- 2008–09 Connecticut Huskies women's basketball team
- 2009–10 Connecticut Huskies women's basketball team
