= Renee Montgomery =

American basketball player (born 1986)

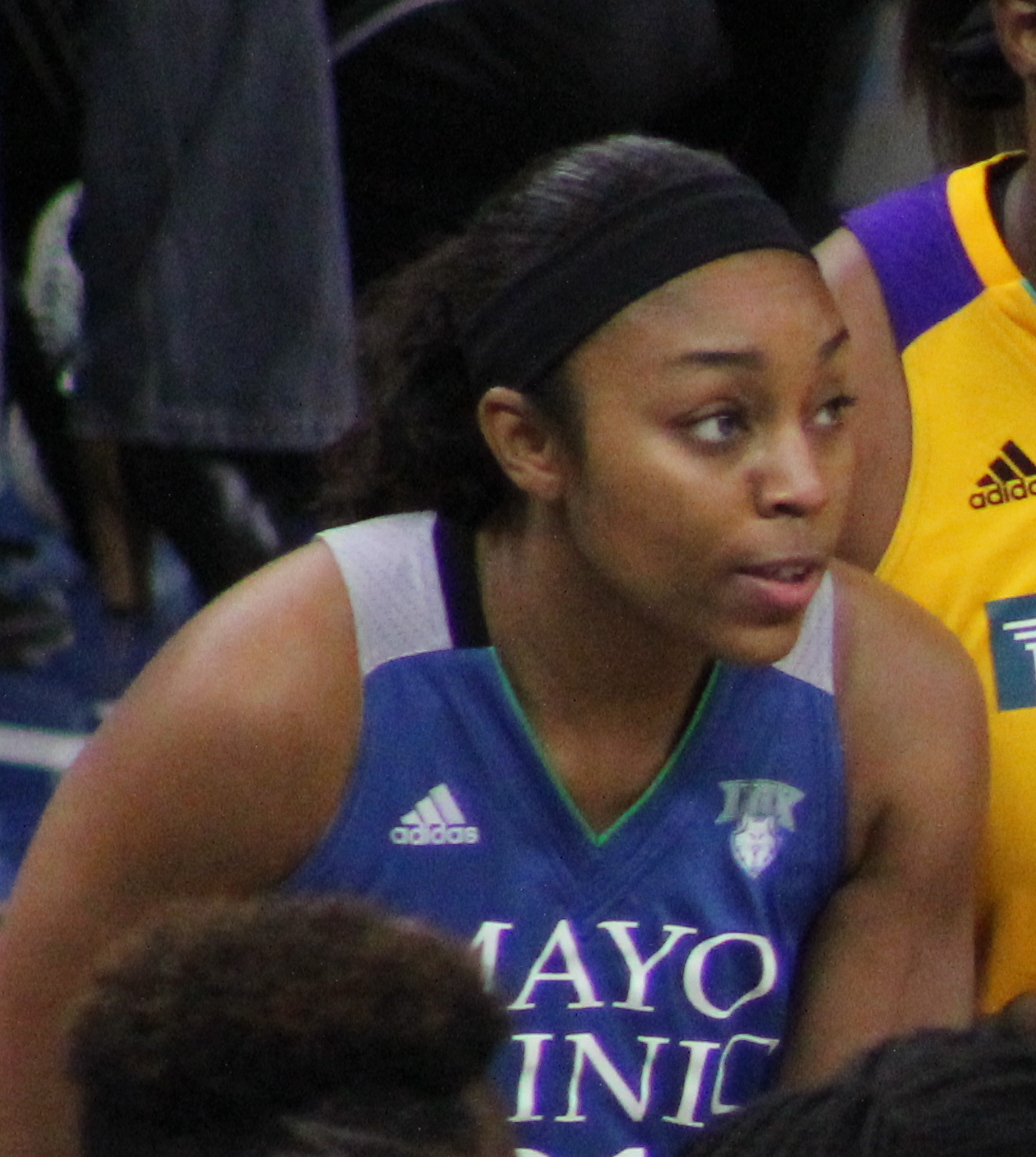
- Montgomery in 2016

Atlanta Dream
- Position: Owner

Personal information
- Born: December 2, 1986 (age 39) St. Albans, West Virginia, U.S.
- Listed height: 5 ft 7 in (1.70 m)
- Listed weight: 141 lb (64 kg)

Career information
- High school: South Charleston (South Charleston, West Virginia)
- College: UConn (2005–2009)
- WNBA draft: 2009: 1st round, 4th overall pick
- Drafted by: Minnesota Lynx
- Playing career: 2009–2019

Career history
- 2009: Minnesota Lynx
- 2009–2010: VICI Aistes Kaunas
- 2010–2011: Maccabi Bnot Ashdod
- 2010–2014: Connecticut Sun
- 2012–2013: Nadezhda Orenburg
- 2014–2015: Vologda-Chevakata
- 2015: Seattle Storm
- 2015–2017: Minnesota Lynx
- 2015–2016: Canberra Capitals
- 2016–2017: Basket Gdynia
- 2017–2018: Maccabi Ramat Hen
- 2018–2019: Atlanta Dream

Career highlights
- 2× WNBA champion (2015, 2017); WNBA Sixth Woman of the Year (2012); WNBA All-Star (2011); WNBA All-Rookie Team (2009); WNBA Skills Challenge Champion (2010); NCAA champion (2009); Honda Sports Award for basketball (2009); Frances Pomeroy Naismith Award (2009); Nancy Lieberman Award (2009); All-American – USBWA (2009); First-team All-American – AP (2009); Third-team All-American – AP (2008); 2× State Farm Coaches' All-American (2008, 2009); 3× First-team All-Big East (2007–2009); Big East Freshman of the Year (2006); Big East All-Freshman Team (2006); McDonald's All-American (2005)
- Stats at WNBA.com
- Stats at Basketball Reference

Renee Danielle Montgomery (born December 2, 1986) is an American former professional basketball player, sports broadcaster and an activist; who is currently vice president, part-owner, and investor of the Atlanta Dream, and one of three owners of the FCF Beasts Indoor Football Team; making her the first player in the WNBA to become an owner and executive of a team and first female owner in the FCF. During her 11-year playing career in the Women's National Basketball Association, she won two championships with the Minnesota Lynx in 2015 and 2017. During her college playing career, she won a national championship with the UConn Huskies in 2009. In 2020, Montgomery opted-out of the WNBA season in protest of police brutality, bringing forth awareness throughout the league and leading multiple campaigns dedicated to human rights.

== High school ==
Montgomery was a high school teammate of fellow future WNBA player Alexis Hornbuckle at South Charleston High School, where she was a captain each year of her high school career. She led the school to the West Virginia state Championships three times, averaging 22.5 points, six assists, five rebounds and five steals while leading the school to the West Virginia Class AAA Final as a senior. She also played on the varsity soccer team.

== College career ==
She attended the University of Connecticut.

=== Freshman year ===
She started 35 of the Huskies' 37 games at point guard and was named 2006 Big East Freshman of the Year.

=== Sophomore year ===
Montgomery started in all 36 games as the Huskies' point guard. She tallied double-figure points in 29 games, including four 20-point plus scoring efforts. Montgomery led the team with a 13.3 scoring average and 163 assists. She was named first team All-Big East. In addition, Montgomery led the USA U-20 National Team to a gold medal during the summer prior to the start of the season at the FIBA U-20 Championship for Women in Mexico City.

=== Junior year ===
Montgomery was selected as an All-Big East First Team choice for the second consecutive season. She was also selected to the All-Big East Tournament Team for the third consecutive season. Montgomery moved to the shooting guard slot on January 19, following a season-ending injury to Mel Thomas, after playing the majority of her career at point guard. She passed the 1,000 point mark in an 82–71 UConn win over North Carolina on January 21, 2008, at Gampel Pavilion. The Huskies lost in the Final Four to Stanford and finished the season at 36–2.

=== Senior year ===
Montgomery reached double figure points in all but four games this season, and led the Huskies to a 39–0 season and her first and only National Championship. She finished her career in the Top Ten of many categories in the UConn women's basketball recordbooks including No. 1 in games played (150), No. 6 in career points (1,990), No. 6 in FG's (703), No. 4 in 3pt FG's (254), No. 9 in FT's (330), No. 3 in Assists (632), and No. 5 in Steals (266). She was the first Husky to be recognized in the "Huskies of Honor" while still playing in a Husky uniform.

Sports Illustrated did a series of thirteen photographs featuring teams chasing or achieving perfect seasons—an entire season without a loss. The photograph of Coach Geno Auriemma embracing Renee Montgomery during the 2008–09 season is included in the collection.

== Professional career ==
=== WNBA ===
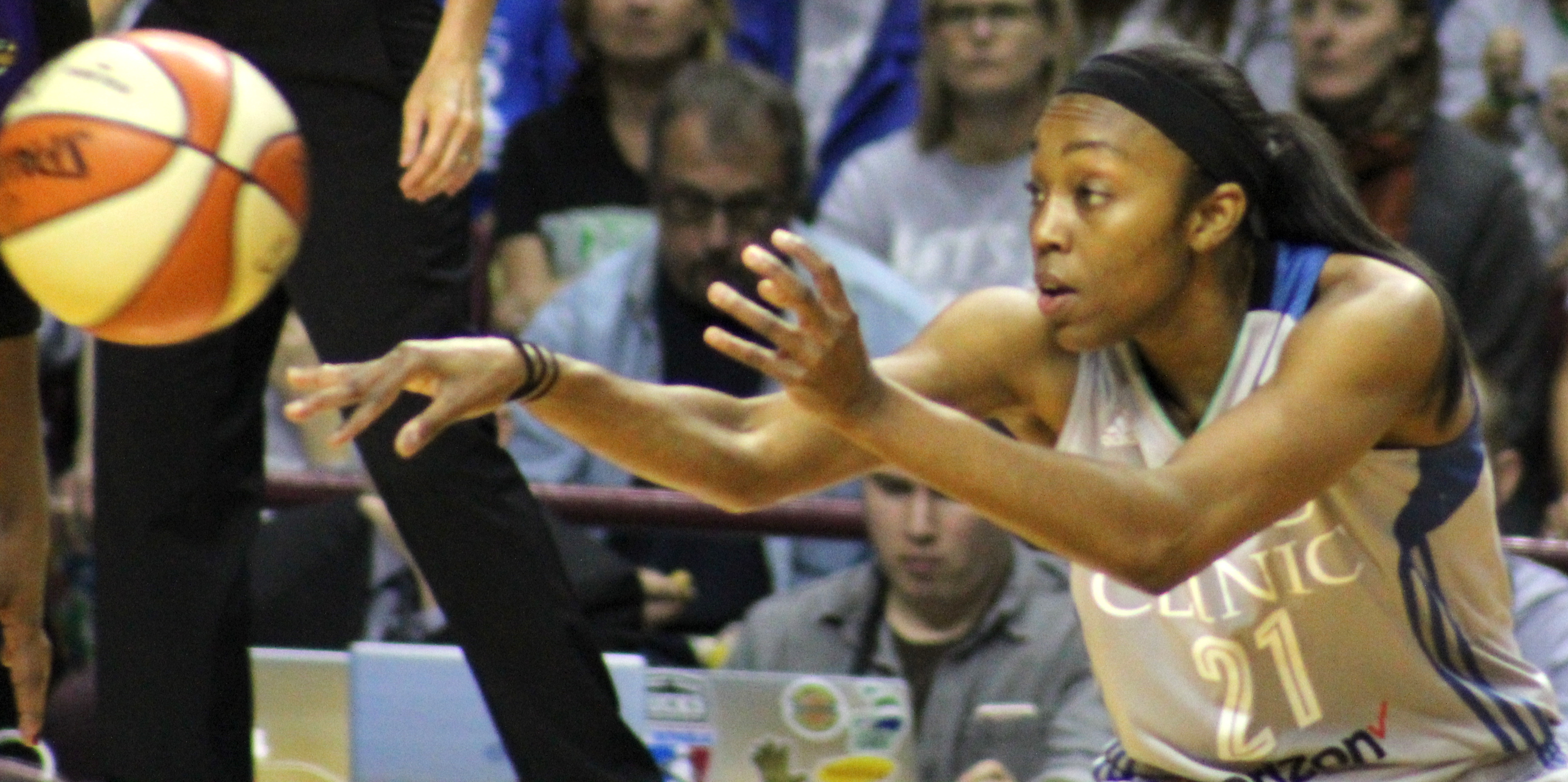
Montgomery during the WNBA Finals in 2017

Montgomery was selected fourth overall in the 2009 WNBA draft by the Minnesota Lynx.

In 2010, Montgomery was traded to the Connecticut Sun, as part of a trade involving Minnesota native Lindsay Whalen and the first pick in the 2010 draft, with which the Sun selected Tina Charles, Montgomery's former college teammate. In college, she wore 20 as a uniform number. Players often become attached to their numbers, some more than others. Renee liked her number so much that her personal website is reneemontgomery20.com. The Sun also added veteran Kara Lawson to the team, who had worn No. 20 in college and with the Sacramento Monarchs, so Montgomery wore No. 21 for the Sun.

During the 2009–10 collegiate basketball season, Montgomery occasionally worked as a color commentator for women's college games broadcast on the ESPN family of networks.

During the 2011 WNBA season, she had the best season of her career once she became the starting point guard for the Sun and averaged 14.6 ppg and was voted as an all-star for the first time in her career.

In 2012, Montgomery came off the bench for the Sun, but was still effective, averaging 11.6 ppg and winning WNBA Sixth Woman of the Year. The Sun made it to the playoffs that year and were one win away from advancing to the Finals, but were eliminated by the eventual champions Indiana Fever in game 3 of the Eastern Conference Finals.

On January 28, 2015, the Connecticut Sun traded Montgomery along with their third and fifteen overall picks in the 2015 WNBA draft to the Seattle Storm in exchange for Camille Little and Shekinna Stricklen.

On July 20, 2015, Montgomery was reacquired by the Minnesota Lynx in a trade for Monica Wright. Montgomery ended up winning her first WNBA championship with the Lynx after they defeated the Indiana Fever in the Finals.

In 2016, Montgomery played a full season for the Lynx for the first time since her rookie season. She averaged 7.5 ppg off the bench and the Lynx were in the hunt to win back-to-back championships, but lost to the Los Angeles Sparks in the Finals.

In 2017, Montgomery averaged 8.0 ppg and achieved a new career-high in field goal shooting percentage. Montgomery also started in 12 of 34 games played while Whalen was sidelined with a hand injury. The Lynx continued to be a championship contender in the league after making it to the Finals for the sixth time in seven seasons, setting up a rematch with the Sparks. This time the Lynx would win in 5 games, winning their fourth championship in seven seasons, tying the now-defunct Houston Comets for most championship titles.

On February 1, 2018, Montgomery signed a multi-year contract with the Atlanta Dream. She would be the starting point guard for the team. On August 12, 2018, Montgomery scored a season-high 30 points along with a career-high 8 three-pointers in an 86–77 victory over the New York Liberty, tying the regular season record for most three-pointers in a game. She also hit 7 of her 8 three-pointers in the second half, breaking the WNBA record for most three-pointers in a half. By the end of the season, Montgomery set the franchise record for most three-pointers made in a season. The Dream finished 23–11 with the number 2 seed in the league, receiving a double-bye to the semi-finals. Without the team's leading scorer Angel McCoughtry, who was sidelined with a knee injury, the Dream were short-handed in the playoffs and lost in five games to the Washington Mystics.

In June 2020, Montgomery announced that she would forgo the 2020 WNBA season due to concerns of racism and the coronavirus. In February 2021, she announced her retirement from the WNBA.

=== Overseas ===
In the 2009-10 off-season, Montgomery played in Lithuania for BC VIČI-Aistės Kaunas. In the 2010-11 off-season, she played in Israel for Maccabi Bnot Ashdod. In the 2012-13 off-season, she played in Russia for Nadezhda Orenburg. In the 2013–14 off-season, she played for Tarsus in Turkey and for Vologda-Chevakata in Russia; in the 2014-15 off-season, she again played for Vologda-Chevakata. In the 2015-16 off-season, she played in Australia for the Canberra Capitals. She signed with Basket 90 Gdynia in Poland for the 2016-17 off-season. In 2017, Montgomery signed with Maccabi Ramat Hen of the Israeli League for the 2017-18 off-season.

=== USA Basketball ===
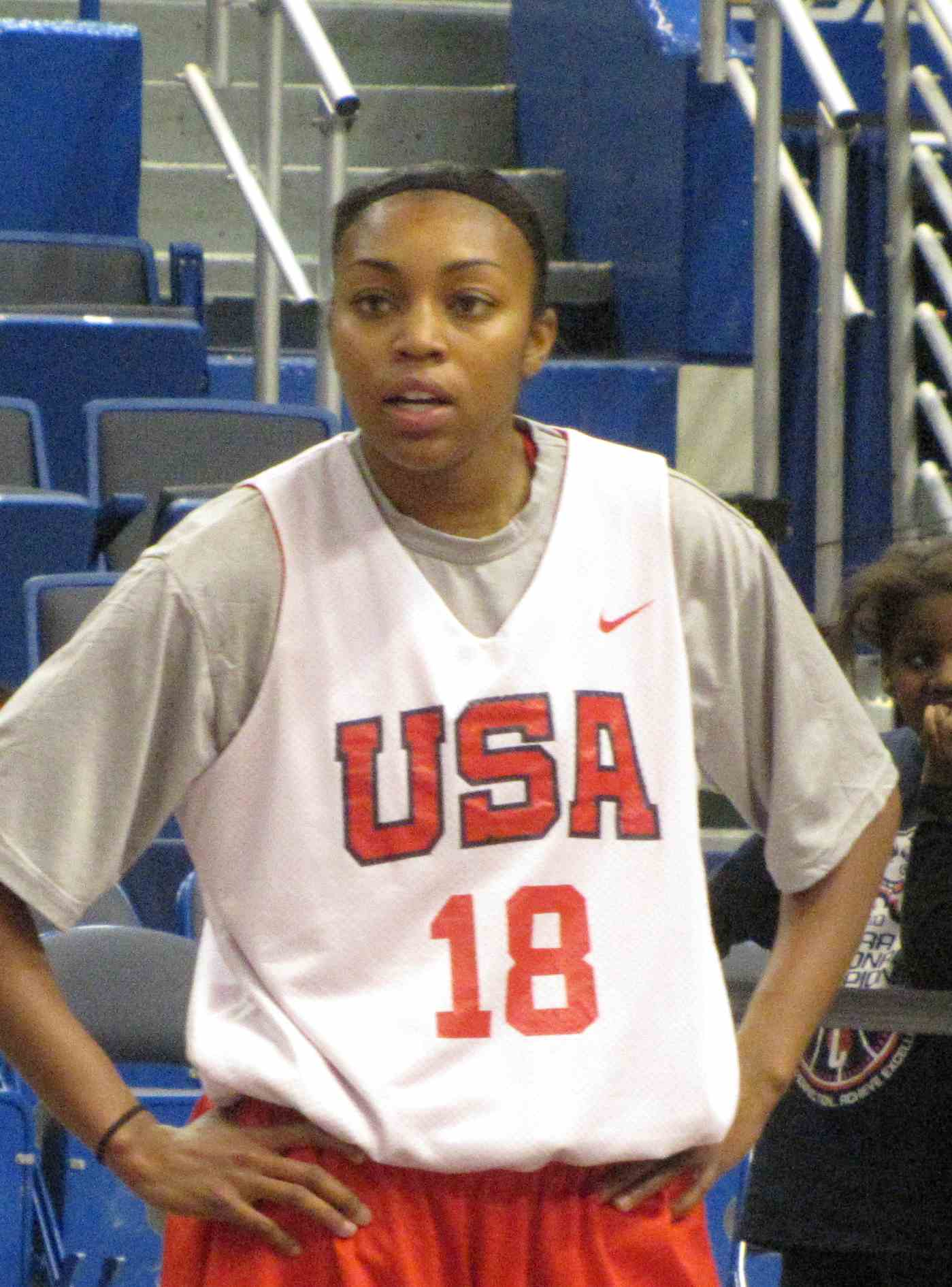
Montgomery at USA National team versus USA Select team scrimmage

Montgomery was invited to the USA Basketball Women's National Team training camp in the fall of 2009. The team selected to play for the FIBA World Championship and the Summer Olympics is usually chosen from these participants.

At the conclusion of the training camp, the team traveled to Ekaterinburg, Russia, where they competed in the 2009 UMMC Ekaterinburg International Invitational.

Montgomery was one of twenty players named to the national team pool, from which twelve players would be chosen to represent the US in the 2010 FIBA World Championships and the 2012 Olympics.

Montgomery was named as one of the National team members to represent the USA Basketball team in the WNBA versus USA Basketball. This game replaced the normal WNBA All-Star game with WNBA All-Stars versus USA Basketball, as part of the preparation for the FIBA World Championship for Women to be held in the Czech Republic during September and October, 2010.

== Career statistics ==
Legend
GP	Games played	GS	Games started	MPG	Minutes per game	RPG	Rebounds per game
APG	Assists per game	SPG	Steals per game	BPG	Blocks per game	PPG	Points per game
TO	Turnovers per game	FG%	Field-goal percentage	3P%	3-point field-goal percentage	FT%	Free-throw percentage
**Bold**	Career best	°	League leader

=== College ===
Renee Montgomery Statistics at University of Connecticut
Year	GP	GS	Min	Avg	FG	FGA	Pct	3FG	FGA	Pct	FT	FTA	Pct	OR	DR	Reb	Avg	PF	FO	Ast	TO	Blk	Stl	Pts	Avg
2005–06	37	35	1035	28	124	288	0.431	39	116	0.336	43	54	0.796	26	54	80	2.2	52	0	123	81	3	63	330	8.9
2006–07	36	36	1136	31.6	177	403	0.439	46	148	0.311	79	113	0.699	19	80	99	2.8	53	0	163	95	5	70	479	13.3
2007–08	38	38	1197	31.5	176	468	0.376	70	225	0.311	115	145	0.793	27	70	97	2.6	55	0	147	75	7	72	537	14.1
2008–09	39	39	1237	31.7	226	505	0.448	99	260	0.381	93	125	0.744	18	64	82	2.1	41	0	199	100	9	61	644	16.5
Totals	150	148	4605	30.7	703	1664	0.422	254	749	0.339	330	437	0.755	90	268	358	2.4	201	0	632	351	24	266	1990	13.3

=== WNBA ===
†	Denotes seasons in which Montgomery won a WNBA championship

==== Regular season ====
Year	Team	GP	GS	MPG	FG%	3P%	FT%	RPG	APG	SPG	BPG	TO	PPG
2009	Minnesota	**34**	9	22.5	.408	.347	.833	1.9	2.1	0.7	**0.3**	1.9	9.0
2010	Connecticut	**34**	23	27.6	.401	.349	.855	**2.2**	4.1	1.3	0.1	2.2	13.3
2011	Connecticut	**34**	**34**	**29.1**	.400	**.384**	.829	2.1	**4.9**	**1.4**	0.1	2.6	**14.6**
2012	Connecticut	**34**	0	24.0	.348	.364	.848	1.9	2.6	1.0	0.1	2.2	11.6
2013	Connecticut	23	18	27.2	.365	.327	**.897**	1.8	3.1	0.7	0.0	2.4	10.1
2014	Connecticut	33	0	16.2	.373	.330	.775	0.8	2.4	0.6	0.1	1.3	6.7
2015*	Seattle	17	2	17.8	.377	.392	.870	1.8	3.0	0.9	0.2	2.0	7.1
2015*	Minnesota	17	5	17.9	.368	.232	.714	1.2	2.5	0.6	0.1	1.0	5.7
2015^{†}	Total	**34**	7	17.8	.372	.312	.759	1.5	2.7	0.7	0.1	**1.0**	6.4
2016	Minnesota	**34**	2	19.3	.397	.321	.828	0.9	2.8	0.9	0.1	1.7	7.5
2017^{†}	Minnesota	**34**	12	21.8	**.424**	.358	.842	1.6	3.4	0.7	0.1	1.7	8.0
2018	Atlanta	**34**	**34**	27.5	.389	.371	.881	1.7	3.7	1.3	0.1	1.6	10.3
2019	Atlanta	**34**	**34**	27.9	.370	.324	.824	2.2	2.6	0.9	0.2	1.9	9.5
Career	11 years, 4 teams	364	173	23.6	.386	.347	.840	1.7	3.1	1.0	0.1	1.9	9.7

==== Postseason ====
Year	Team	GP	GS	MPG	FG%	3P%	FT%	RPG	APG	SPG	BPG	TO	PPG
2011	Connecticut	2	2	28.5	.471	.333	.875	1.5	**4.5**	0.5	**0.5**	3.5	**13.0**
2012	Connecticut	5	0	24.0	.393	.412	.833	1.2	3.4	0.4	0.0	1.4	6.8
2015^{†}	Minnesota	**9**	0	9.7	**.478**	.308	.875	0.3	0.9	**0.6**	0.1	**0.5**	3.7
2016	Minnesota	8	0	12.6	.370	**.444**	**.900**	0.4	1.9	0.5	0.0	1.0	4.1
2017^{†}	Minnesota	8	0	17.1	.449	.393	.500	1.3	1.9	0.5	0.2	1.2	7.0
2018	Atlanta	5	**5**	**31.7**	.293	.286	.846	**2.0**	4.2	0.2	0.2	1.8	8.6
Career	6 years, 3 teams	37	7	17.9	.400	.356	.851	0.9	2.3	0.5	0.1	1.2	6.1

== Post-playing career ==
=== Ownership of Atlanta Dream ===
In February 2021, Montgomery was part of a three-member investor group that was approved to purchase the Atlanta Dream. The ownership change followed pressure on former owner Kelly Loeffler, a Republican former U.S. Senator who had angered WNBA players with her opposition to the league's racial justice initiatives, to sell her share of the Dream. Loeffler had previously refused a visit with Montgomery on social justice initiatives.

=== Ownership of FCF Beasts ===
On January 4, 2021, Montgomery joined Miro and Marshawn Lynch as a partial owner of the FCF Beasts of Fan Controlled Football.

=== Broadcasting ===
In 2020, Montgomery began working as a studio analyst for Fox Sports Southeast's broadcasts of Atlanta Hawks games. She had previously appeared on the network as a guest analyst.

In March 2021, Montgomery was announced as the co-host of a Crooked Media podcast titled Takeline with Jason Concepcion.

Montgomery called 2021 NCAA women's basketball tournament games for ESPN alongside Beth Mowins.

In September 2021, Montgomery joined Meadowlark Media, for which she makes the podcast Montgomery & Co.

=== Other ventures ===
Montgomery is an investor in MOORvision Technologies and Ucam, a camera built to capture athlete's point of view during games.

== Documentary ==
In 2024, A Radical Act: Renee Montgomery, a feature documentary chronicling Montgomery's journey from WNBA star to team co-owner and activist, was released on Roku Originals. Produced by LeBron James and Maverick Carter’s UNINTERRUPTED and directed by Emmy Award winner Sandrine Orabona, the film explores Montgomery's impact on sports, social justice, and community leadership. The documentary premiered at the Uninterrupted Film Festival and screened at the Martha's Vineyard African American Film Festival.

== Personal life ==
In April 2020, Montgomery married music artist Sirena Grace. She has a stepson named Angel Wiley, and a clip from 2023 featuring them dancing in their seats at an Atlanta Dream game went viral on social media in January 2025, in which Wiley is referred to as "Chopped Chin" in reference to the appearance of his chin.

== Awards and honors ==
- 2005 McDonald's All-America.
- 2005 Gatorade West Virginia High School Player of the Year.
- 2005 Street & Smith Third Team All-America.
- 2005 Associated Press West Virginia Player of the Year.
- 2005 WBCA Honorable Mention All-America.
- 2004 Street & Smith Third Team All-America.
- 2003 Street & Smith Honorable Mention All-America
- 2009 Nancy Lieberman Award – Top Point Guard
- 2009 Honda Sports Award, basketball
- 2009 Finalist for Honda-Broderick Cup
- 2009 Frances Pomeroy Naismith Award
- 2009 Gazette Sportsperson of the Year

== See also ==
- List of Connecticut women's basketball players with 1000 points
