= 2016 FIBA Africa Women's Clubs Champions Cup =

2016 FIBA Africa Champions Cup for Women
22nd FIBA Africa Champions Cup for Women

Tournament details
- Host country: Mozambique
- Dates: November 25 – December 6
- Teams: 10 (from 53 federations)
- Venue: 1 (in 1 host city)

Final positions
- Champions: Angola (Interclube's 5th title; Angola's 7th title)

Tournament statistics
- MVP: (United States) Sequoia Holmes
- Top scorer: (Mozambique) Leia 14.4
- Top rebounds: (Democratic Republic of the Congo) Nyota 7.1
- Top assists: (Angola) I.Francisco 3.6
- PPG (Team): (Angola) Interclube 74.4
- RPG (Team): (Mozambique) Ferroviário 25.1
- APG (Team): (Angola) 1º d'Agosto 14.3

Official website
- 2016 FIBA Africa Women's Clubs Champions Cup

The 2016 FIBA Africa Women's Clubs Champions Cup (22nd edition), was an international basketball tournament that took place at the Pavilhão do Maxaquene, in Maputo, Mozambique, from November 25 to December 6, 2015. The tournament, organized by FIBA Africa and hosted by Clube Ferroviário de Maputo, was contested by 10 teams split into 2 groups, the first four of each group qualifying for the knock-out stage (quarter, semis and final).

The tournament was won by Primeiro de Agosto from Angola.

== Draw ==
Group A	Group B
(Togo) Étoile Filante (Cameroon) FAP Yaoundé (Mozambique) Ferroviário de Maputo (Angola) Interclube; Kenya Ports Authority	(Mozambique) A Politécnica (Nigeria) First Bank (Algeria) GS Pétroliers (Angola) Primeiro de Agosto (Kenya) USIU Flames

== Preliminary rounds ==
Times given below are in CAT UTC+2.

Qualified for the quarter-finals
Relegated to the 9th classification

=== Group A ===
	Teams	M	W	L	PF	PA	Diff	P
1.	(Angola) Interclube	4	4	0	310	166	+144	8
2.	(Mozambique) Ferroviário de Maputo	4	3	1	281	211	+70	7
3.	(Cameroon) FAP Yaoundé	4	2	2	229	246	-17	6
4.	(Kenya) K.P.A.	4	1	3	221	285	-64	5
5.	(Togo) Étoile Filante	4	0	4	176	309	-133	4

25 November 2016
16:00

Boxscore

K.P.A. (Kenya)	43–57	(Cameroon) FAP Yaoundé
Scoring by quarter: 5-13, 16-14, 8-21, 14-9
Pts: Wanyama 15; Rebs: Odhiambo 5 Asts: three players 2		Pts: Njiogap 17; Rebs: Fabo 5 Asts: Mbiandja 2

Pavilhão do Maxaquene, Maputo

25 November 2016
19:00

Boxscore

Ferrov Maputo (Mozambique)	43–57	(Angola) Interclube
Scoring by quarter: 6-16, 8-14, 15-15, 14-12
Pts: Anabela 14; Rebs: Mitchell 6 Asts: three players 2		Pts: Pauline, Ngiendula 10; Rebs: Sequoia 8 Asts: Pauline 3

Pavilhão do Maxaquene, Maputo

27 November 2016
13:30

Boxscore

Étoile Filante (Togo)	30–94	(Angola) Interclube
Scoring by quarter: 4-22, 14-24, 6-20, 6-28
Pts: Pindra 10; Rebs: Agossa 6 Asts: four players 1		Pts: Ngiendula 14; Rebs: Angelina 8 Asts: Sequoia 3

Pavilhão do Maxaquene, Maputo

27 November 2016
17:00

Boxscore

K.P.A. (Kenya)	58–84	(Mozambique) Ferrov Maputo
Scoring by quarter: 15-24, 12-24, 7-18, 24-18
Pts: Mwangale 15; Rebs: three players 5 Asts: three players 1		Pts: Anabela 22; Rebs: Mitchell 10; Asts: Dulce 5

Pavilhão do Maxaquene, Maputo

28 November 2016
13:30

Boxscore

Étoile Filante (Togo)	55–71	(Kenya) K.P.A.
Scoring by quarter: 16-14, 14-21, 7-15, 18-21
Pts: Houessou 15; Rebs: Agossa 5 Asts: Adjoussi, Kodjo 2		Pts: Wanyama, Luvandwa 17; Rebs: Wanyama 6 Asts: three players 2

Pavilhão do Maxaquene, Maputo

28 November 2016
18:00

Boxscore

FAP Yaoundé (Cameroon)	59–79	(Mozambique) Ferrov Maputo
Scoring by quarter: 14-10, 14-24, 18-26, 13-19
Pts: Minna 17; Rebs: Fabo 6 Asts: Njiké 2		Pts: Mafanela 18; Rebs: Mafanela 5 Asts: Edwards 3

Pavilhão do Maxaquene, Maputo

29 November 2016
13:30

Boxscore

FAP Yaoundé (Cameroon)	69–54	(Togo) Étoile Filante
Scoring by quarter: 16-11, 28-14, 15-13, 10-16
Pts: Nkoumou 12; Rebs: Njiogap 4 Asts: Minna 5		Pts: Afetse 13; Rebs: Agossa, Adjoussi 4 Asts: Adjoussi 5

Pavilhão do Maxaquene, Maputo

29 November 2016
20:15

Boxscore

Interclube (Angola)	89–49	(Kenya) K.P.A.
Scoring by quarter: 24-11, 22-10, 25-13, 18-15
Pts: Sequoia 15; Rebs: Nadir 9 Asts: three players 4		Pts: Luvandwa 14; Rebs: Wanyama 8 Asts: four players 1

Pavilhão do Maxaquene, Maputo

30 November 2016
15:45

Boxscore

Interclube (Angola)	70–44	(Cameroon) FAP Yaoundé
Scoring by quarter: 20-14, 17-17, 18-4, 15-9
Pts: Pauline 16; Rebs: Sequoia, Nadir 3 Asts: Sequoia, Italee 4		Pts: Njiogap 18; Rebs: Njiogap, Fabo 4 Asts: Mbiandja 2

Pavilhão do Maxaquene, Maputo

30 November 2016
18:00

Boxscore

Ferrov Maputo (Mozambique)	75–37	(Togo) Étoile Filante
Scoring by quarter: 16-15, 18-12, 22-4, 19-6
Pts: Vilma 16; Rebs: Vilma 6 Asts: Anabela 4		Pts: Kodjo 12; Rebs: Kodjo 6 Asts: Houessou, Afetstse 3

Pavilhão do Maxaquene, Maputo

Qualified for the quarter-finals
Relegated to the 9-12 classification

=== Group B ===
	Teams	M	W	L	PF	PA	Diff	P
1.	(Angola) Primeiro de Agosto	4	4	0	326	193	+133	8
2.	(Nigeria) First Bank	4	3	1	270	232	+38	7
3.	(Algeria) GS Pétroliers	4	2	2	250	223	+27	6
4.	(Mozambique) A Politécnica	4	1	3	190	239	-49	5
5.	(Kenya) USIU Flames	4	0	4	153	302	-149	4

26 November 2016
15:45

Boxscore

1º de Agosto (Angola)	74–57	(Algeria) GS Pétroliers
Scoring by quarter: 21-9, 20-14, 13-13, 20-21
Pts: McCray 20; Rebs: Sónia, Luísa 4 Asts: Isabel 8		Pts: Belaidi 14; Rebs: Chenaf 3 Asts: Refes 2

Pavilhão do Maxaquene, Maputo

26 November 2016
18:00

Boxscore

First Bank (Nigeria)	65–59	(Mozambique) A Politécnica
Scoring by quarter: 18-19, 16-15, 25-12, 6-13
Pts: Atosu 18; Rebs: Fofana 3 Asts: Atosu 2		Pts: Nilza 17; Rebs: Nilza 10; Asts: Isabel 5

Pavilhão do Maxaquene, Maputo

27 November 2016
20:15

Boxscore

1º de Agosto (Angola)	76–62	(Nigeria) First Bank
Scoring by quarter: 18-14, 22-17, 22-15, 14-16
Pts: Matiquite 18; Rebs: Matiquite 4 Asts: McCray 6		Pts: Ukato 17; Rebs: Udeaja 6 Asts: Udeaja, Atosu 2

Pavilhão do Maxaquene, Maputo

27 November 2016
15:45

Boxscore

USIU Flames (Kenya)	41–53	(Mozambique) A Politécnica
Scoring by quarter: 9-18, 10-13, 13-8, 9-14
Pts: A.Okoth 18; Rebs: A.Okoth 7 Asts: three players 1		Pts: Nilza 13; Rebs: Joaquina 8 Asts: Mavamba 3

Pavilhão do Maxaquene, Maputo

28 November 2016
15:45

Boxscore

USIU Flames (Kenya)	41–98	(Angola) 1º de Agosto
Scoring by quarter: 12-26, 9-28, 7-26, 13-18
Pts: G.Otieno 18; Rebs: Nyagah 4 Asts: four players 1		Pts: Luísa 18; Rebs: Leia 8 Asts: McCray 7

Pavilhão do Maxaquene, Maputo

28 November 2016
20:15

Boxscore

GS Pétroliers (Algeria)	64–66	(Nigeria) First Bank
Scoring by quarter: 9-21, 17-9, 22-17, 16-19
Pts: Nyota 22; Rebs: Nyota 12; Asts: Belaidi 4		Pts: Atosu 20; Rebs: Udeaja 7 Asts: Atosu, Akashili 2

Pavilhão do Maxaquene, Maputo

29 November 2016
15:45

Boxscore

GS Pétroliers (Algeria)	74–38	(Kenya) USIU Flames
Scoring by quarter: 24-4, 14-17, 20-12, 16-5
Pts: Kazadi 17; Rebs: Kazadi 8 Asts: Belaidi 4		Pts: M.Otieno 11; Rebs: Andalia 5 Asts: M.Otieno 2

Pavilhão do Maxaquene, Maputo

29 November 2016
18:00

Boxscore

A Politécnica (Mozambique)	33–78	(Angola) 1º de Agosto
Scoring by quarter: 9-17, 0-26, 6-22, 18-13
Pts: Timba 12; Rebs: Mavamba 4 Asts: Mavamba, Samo 2		Pts: Matiquite 11; Rebs: Matiquite 7 Asts: Leia 3

Pavilhão do Maxaquene, Maputo

30 November 2016
13:30

Boxscore

First Bank (Nigeria)	77–33	(Kenya) USIU Flames
Scoring by quarter: 19-8, 20-8, 24-8, 14-9
Pts: Udeaja 16; Rebs: four players 4 Asts: four players 2		Pts: Irankunda 8 Rebs: Nyagah 7 Asts: G.Otieno 2

Pavilhão do Maxaquene, Maputo

30 November 2016
20:15

Boxscore

A Politécnica (Mozambique)	45–55	(Algeria) GS Pétroliers
Scoring by quarter: 5-11, 12-15, 17-9, 11-20
Pts: Ornela 13; Rebs: Alice 4 Asts: Joaquina 3		Pts: Kazadi 15; Rebs: Kazadi 7 Asts: three players 2

Pavilhão do Maxaquene, Maputo

== Knockout stage ==
Championship bracket

Quarter-finals
Fri 2 Dec 2016 - 15:45
(Angola) Interclube	62
(Angola) A Politécnica	33
Fri 2 Dec 2016 - 20:15
(Nigeria) First Bank	80
(Cameroon) FAP Yaoundé	53
Fri 2 Dec 2016 - 18:00
(Mozambique) Ferroviário	69
(Angola) GS Pétroliers	57
Fri 2 Dec 2016 - 13:30
(Mozambique) 1º de Agosto	72
(Kenya) K.P.A.	40

Semi-finals
Sat 3 Dec 2016 - 18:00
(Angola) Interclube	82
(Nigeria) First Bank	66
Sat 3 Dec 2015 - 20:15
(Mozambique) Ferroviário	68
(Angola) 1º de Agosto	58

Final
Sun 4 Dec 2016 - 18:00
(Angola) Interclube	67
(Mozambique) Ferroviário	49
Third place
Sun 4 Dec 2016 - 15:45
(Nigeria) First Bank	62
(Angola) 1º de Agosto	54

5-8th bracket

5-8th Place
Sat 3 Dec 2016 - 13:30
(Algeria) GS Pétroliers	63
(Kenya) K.P.A.	39
Sat 3 Dec 2016 - 15:45
(Cameroon) FAP Yaoundé	56
(Mozambique) A Politécnica	55

5th place
Sun 4 Dec 2016 - 13:30
(Algeria) GS Pétroliers	62
(Cameroon) FAP Yaoundé	46
7th place
Sun 4 Dec 2016 - 11:15
(Kenya) K.P.A.	67
(Mozambique) A Politécnica	26

=== 9th place ===
2 December 2016
11:15

Boxscore

Étoile Filante (Togo)	61–62	(Kenya) USIU Flames
Scoring by quarter: 13-22, 12-16, 18-6, 18-18
Pts: Darlix 21; Rebs: Houessou 5 Asts: Houessou 5		Pts: G.Otieno 26; Rebs: Irankunda 6 Asts: Irankunda 6

Pavilhão do Maxaquene, Maputo

=== Quarter finals ===
2 December 2016
13:30

Boxscore

K.P.A. (Kenya)	40–72	(Angola) 1º de Agosto
Scoring by quarter: 18-22, 8-17, 5-14, 9-19
Pts: Wanyama 10; Rebs: Koranga 7 Asts: Mwangale 5		Pts: A.Gonçalves 15; Rebs: Luísa 9 Asts: Isabel 5

Pavilhão do Maxaquene, Maputo

2 December 2016
15:45

Boxscore

A Politécnica (Mozambique)	33–62	(Angola) Interclube
Scoring by quarter: 10-12, 4-19, 8-14, 11-17
Pts: Isabel 8 Rebs: Benezita 3 Asts: Benezita 2		Pts: Pauline 13; Rebs: Angelina 5 Asts: 0

Pavilhão do Maxaquene, Maputo

2 December 2016
18:00

Boxscore

GS Pétroliers (Algeria)	57–69	(Mozambique) Ferrov Maputo
Scoring by quarter: 21-14, 13-16, 15-24, 8-15
Pts: Belaidi 14; Rebs: Nyota 7 Asts: Taïbi 7		Pts: Ingvild 16; Rebs: Ornélia 6 Asts: Ornélia 8

Pavilhão do Maxaquene, Maputo

2 December 2016
20:15

Boxscore

FAP Yaoundé (Cameroon)	53–80	(Nigeria) First Bank
Scoring by quarter: 11-18, 11-27, 10-19, 21-16
Pts: Mbiandja, Njiogap 15; Rebs: Mbiandja 7 Asts: Mbiandja 4		Pts: Akashili 16; Rebs: four players 3 Asts: Atosu 7

Pavilhão do Maxaquene, Maputo

=== 5th-8th place ===
3 December 2016
13:30

Boxscore

K.P.A. (Kenya)	39–63	(Algeria) GS Pétroliers
Scoring by quarter: 9-18, 4-17, 18-17, 8-11
Pts: Koranga 11; Rebs: B.Okoth 4 Asts: Mjomba 3		Pts: Belaidi 18; Rebs: Taïbi 8 Asts: Nyota 4

Pavilhão do Maxaquene, Maputo

3 December 2016
15:45

Boxscore

A Politécnica (Mozambique)	55–56	(Cameroon) FAP Yaoundé
Scoring by quarter: 8-15, 10-19, 16-7, 21-15
Pts: Isabel 11; Rebs: Nilza 5 Asts: Isabel 3		Pts: Nkoumou 20; Rebs: Fabo 4 Asts: Mbiandja 6

Pavilhão do Maxaquene, Maputo

=== Semifinals ===
3 December 2016
18:00

Boxscore

Interclube (Angola)	82–66	(Nigeria) First Bank
Scoring by quarter: 26-17, 14-14, 20-12, 22-23
Pts: Sequoia 20; Rebs: Ngiendula 5 Asts: Sequoia 6		Pts: Rodriguez 19; Rebs: Sanni 6 Asts: Sanni 6

Pavilhão do Maxaquene, Maputo

3 December 2016
20:15

Boxscore

1º de Agosto (Angola)	58–68	(Mozambique) Ferrov Maputo
Scoring by quarter: 11-18, 10-17, 20-21, 17-12
Pts: Leia 16; Rebs: Sónia 5 Asts: R.Gala 3		Pts: Anabela 13; Rebs: Mitchell 8 Asts: Mitchell 4

Pavilhão do Maxaquene, Maputo

=== 7th place ===
4 December 2016
11:15

Boxscore

A Politécnica (Mozambique)	26–67	(Kenya) K.P.A.
Scoring by quarter: 8-14, 6-20, 4-24, 8-9
Pts: Timba 8 Rebs: Ornela 10; Asts: Timba 2		Pts: Koranga 12; Rebs: B.Okoth 8 Asts: Mwangale 4

Pavilhão do Maxaquene, Maputo

=== 5th place ===
4 December 2016
13:30

Boxscore

FAP Yaoundé (Cameroon)	46–62	(Algeria) GS Pétroliers
Scoring by quarter: 16-10, 6-13, 10-19, 14-20
Pts: Njiogap 17; Rebs: Nkoumou, Mbiandja 5 Asts: Minna, Mbiandja 3		Pts: Nyota 15; Rebs: Nyota 8 Asts: Kazadi, Belaidi 3

Pavilhão do Maxaquene, Maputo

=== Bronze medal game ===
4 December 2016
15:45

Boxscore

First Bank (Nigeria)	62–54	(Angola) 1º de Agosto
Scoring by quarter: 10-17, 11-15, 22-15, 19-7
Pts: Akashili 14; Rebs: Udeaja 8 Asts: Ukato, Fofana 2		Pts: Leia 17; Rebs: Leia 6 Asts: McCray 6

Pavilhão do Maxaquene, Maputo

=== Gold medal game ===
4 December 2016
18:00

Boxscore

Interclube (Angola)	67–49	(Mozambique) Ferrov Maputo
Scoring by quarter: 22-7, 15-13, 13-17, 17-12
Pts: Italee 26; Rebs: Nadir 6 Asts: Italee 5		Pts: Anabela 17; Rebs: Mafanela 6 Asts: three players 2

Pavilhão do Maxaquene, Maputo

== Final standings ==
Rank	Team	Record
Gold medal	(Angola) Interclube	8–0
Silver medal	(Mozambique) Ferroviário de Maputo	6–2
Bronze medal	(Nigeria) First Bank	6–2
4.	(Angola) Primeiro de Agosto	5–3
5.	(Algeria) GS Pétroliers	6–2
6.	(Cameroon) FAP Yaoundé	3–5
7.	(Kenya) K.P.A.	4–4
8.	(Mozambique) A Politécnica	2–6
9.	(Kenya) USIU Flames	1–4
10.	(Togo) Étoile Filante	0–5

== Statistical leaders ==
=== Individual Tournament Highs ===
Points

Rank	Name	G	Pts	PPG
1	(Mozambique) Leia Dongue	7	101	14.4
2	(Kenya) Georgia Otieno	5	70	14
3	(Cameroon) Astride Njiogap	7	93	13.3
4	(Mozambique) Anabela Cossa	7	90	12.9
5	(Democratic Republic of the Congo) Mireille Nyota	7	85	12.1
6	(Nigeria) Nkechi Akashili	7	84	12
7	(Democratic Republic of the Congo) Pauline Nsimbo	7	81	11.6
8	(Democratic Republic of the Congo) Thethe Kazadi	7	80	11.4
9	(United States) Sequoia Holmes	7	79	11.3
10	(United States) Danielle McCray	7	79	11.3

Rebounds

Rank	Name	G	Rbs	RPG
1	(Democratic Republic of the Congo) Mireille Nyota	7	50	7.1
2	(Kenya) Chioma Udeaja	7	34	4.9
2	(Mozambique) Leia Dongue	7	33	4.7
4	(Democratic Republic of the Congo) Thethe Kazadi	7	33	4.7
5	(Angola) Nadir Manuel	7	31	4.4
6	(Kenya) Mercy Wanyama	7	30	4.3
7	(Mozambique) Nilza Chiziane	7	29	4.1
8	(United States) Rachel Mitchell	7	28	4
9	(Kenya) Belinda Okoth	7	28	4
10	Abra Agossa	5	20	4

Assists

Rank	Name	G	Ast	APG
1	(Angola) Isabel Francisco	7	25	3.6
1	(United States) Danielle McCray	7	25	3.6
1	(United States) Sequoia Holmes	7	20	2.9
1	(Cameroon) Priscilla Mbiandja	7	18	2.6
5	(Nigeria) Upe Atosu	7	17	2.4
6	(Angola) Italee Lucas	7	17	2.4
7	(Kenya) Natalie Mwangale	6	14	2.3
8	Christelle Houessou	5	11	2.2
9	(Burundi) Cynthia Irankunda	5	11	2.2
10	(Nigeria) Olayinka Sanni	5	11	2.2

Steals

Rank	Name	G	Sts	SPG
1	(Mozambique) Ingvild Mucauro	7	33	4.7
2	(Democratic Republic of the Congo) Mireille Nyota	7	20	2.9
3	(Kenya) Georgia Otieno	5	13	2.6
3	(Angola) Nadir Manuel	7	18	2.6
5	(United States) Sequoia Holmes	7	17	2.4
5	(United States) Danielle McCray	7	17	2.4
7	(Kenya) Cynthia Irankunda	5	12	2.4
8	(Cameroon) Astride Njiogap	7	14	2
8	(Mozambique) Odélia Mafanela	7	14	2
10	(Cameroon) Priscilla Mbiandja	7	14	2

Blocks

Rank	Name	G	Bks	BPG
1	Akpene Kodjo	5	2	0.4
2	Diane Nikuzi	5	1	0.2
3	(Democratic Republic of the Congo) Pauline Nsimbo	7	1	0.1
3	(Angola) Rosemira Daniel	7	1	0.1
5				
7				
10				

Turnovers

Rank	Name	G	Tos	TPG
1	(Cameroon) Priscilla Mbiandja	7	40	5.7
2	(Kenya) Georgia Otieno	5	24	4.8
3	(Kenya) Melissa Otieno	5	31	4.8
3	(Kenya) Mercy Wanyama	7	31	4.4
5	Christelle Houessou	5	22	4.4
6	(Democratic Republic of the Congo) Thethe Kazadi	7	30	4.3
7	Aku Afetse	5	21	4.2
7	Abra Agossa	5	21	4.2
9	Mireille Nyota	7	28	4
10	(Kenya) Maureen Andalia	5	20	4

2-point field goal percentage

Pos	Name	A	M	%
1	(United States) Danielle McCray	44	32	72.7
2	(Mozambique) Leia Dongue	55	39	70.9
3	(Democratic Republic of the Congo) Thethe Kazadi	47	28	59.6
4	Mireille Nyota	53	31	58.5
5	(Cameroon) Astride Njiogap	46	25	54.3
6	(Kenya) Georgia Otieno	30	16	53.3
7	(Kenya) Chioma Udeaja	53	28	52.8
8	Felmas Koranga	45	23	51.1
9	(Angola) Nkechi Akashili	48	24	50
10	Akpene Kodjo	30	15	50

3-point field goal percentage

Pos	Name	A	M	%
1	(Mozambique) Anabela Cossa	36	21	58.3
2	(Angola) Italee Lucas	18	10	46.7
3	(Angola) Ana Gonçalves	23	12	52.2
4	(Nigeria) Upe Atosu	20	10	50
5	(United States) Sequoia Holmes	32	14	43.8
6	(Mexico) Brisa Rodriguez	21	9	42.9
7	(Angola) Felizarda Jorge	14	6	42.9
8	(Mozambique) Ingvild Mucauro	14	6	42.9
9	(Algeria) Rachida Belaidi	43	18	41.9
10	(Algeria) Shahnez Boushaki	15	6	40

Free throw percentage

Pos	Name	A	M	%
1	(Nigeria) Upe Atosu	36	31	86.1
2	(Mozambique) Odélia Mafanela	26	21	80.8
3	(Mozambique) Ingvild Mucauro	21	16	76.2
4	(Kenya) Georgia Otieno	27	20	74.1
5	(Cameroon) Priscilla Mbiandja	40	29	72.5
6	(Cameroon) Astride Njiogap	39	28	71.8
7	(Democratic Republic of the Congo) Pauline Nsimbo	26	18	69.2
8	(Mozambique) Ornela Mulhui	23	15	65.2
9	(Angola) Cristina Matiquite	22	14	63.6
10	(Nigeria) Magdalene Ukato	22	14	63.6

=== Individual Game Highs ===
Department	Name	Total	Opponent
Points	(Angola) Italee Lucas (Kenya) Georgia Otieno	26	(Mozambique) Ferroviário Maputo (Togo) Étoile Filante
Rebounds	Mireille Nyota	12	(Nigeria) First Bank (Mozambique) A Politécnica
Assists	(Angola) Isabel Francisco (Mozambique) Ornélia Mutombene	8	(Algeria) GS Pétroliers
Steals	(Mozambique) Ingvild Mucauro	8	(Algeria) GS Pétroliers
Blocks	five players	1	
2-point field goal percentage	(Mozambique) Leia Dongue	100% (7/7)	(Algeria) GS Pétroliers
3-point field goal percentage	(Nigeria) Upe Atosu (Mozambique) Anabela Cossa	100% (3/3)	(Mozambique) A Politécnica (Angola) 1º de Agosto
Free throw percentage	four players	100% (6/6)	
Turnovers	three players	9	

=== Team Tournament Highs ===
Points

Rank	Name	G	Pts	PPG
1	(Angola) Interclube	7	521	74.4
2	(Angola) 1º de Agosto	7	510	72.9
3	(Nigeria) First Bank	7	478	68.3
4	(Mozambique) Ferroviário de Maputo	7	467	66.7
5	(Algeria) GS Pétroliers	7	432	61.7
6	(Cameroon) FAP Yaoundé	7	384	54.9
7	(Kenya) K.P.A.	7	367	52.4
8	(Togo) Étoile Filante	5	237	47.4
9	(Mozambique) A Politécnica	7	304	43.4
10	(Kenya) USIU Flames	5	215	43

Rebounds

Rank	Name	G	Rbs	RPG
1	(Mozambique) Ferroviário de Maputo	7	176	25.1
2	(Angola) 1º de Agosto	7	166	23.7
3	(Angola) Interclube	7	165	23.6
3	(Algeria) GS Pétroliers	7	161	23
5	(Kenya) K.P.A.	7	157	22.4
6	(Mozambique) A Politécnica	7	150	21.4
7	(Togo) Étoile Filante	5	102	20.4
8	(Nigeria) First Bank	7	140	20
9	(Cameroon) FAP Yaoundé	7	139	19.9
10	(Kenya) USIU Flames	5	95	19

Assists

Rank	Name	G	Ast	APG
1	(Angola) 1º de Agosto	7	100	14.3
2	(Mozambique) Ferroviário de Maputo	7	97	13.9
3	(Algeria) GS Pétroliers	7	91	13
4	(Angola) Interclube	7	81	11.6
5	(Togo) Étoile Filante	5	50	10
6	(Nigeria) First Bank	7	67	9.6
6	(Cameroon) FAP Yaoundé	7	58	8.3
8	(Kenya) K.P.A.	7	57	8.1
9	(Mozambique) A Politécnica	7	55	7.9
10	(Kenya) USIU Flames	5	36	7.2

Steals

Rank	Name	G	Sts	SPG
1	(Mozambique) Ferroviário de Maputo	7	109	15.6
2	(Angola) Interclube	7	97	13.9
3	(Angola) 1º de Agosto	7	84	12
4	(Kenya) K.P.A.	7	72	10.3
5	(Algeria) GS Pétroliers	7	70	10
6	(Mozambique) A Politécnica	7	66	9.4
7	(Kenya) USIU Flames	5	47	9.4
8	(Nigeria) First Bank	7	63	9
9	(Togo) Étoile Filante	5	42	8.4
10	(Cameroon) FAP Yaoundé	7	58	8.3

Blocks

Rank	Name	G	Bks	BPG
1	(Togo) Étoile Filante	5	2	0.4
2	(Angola) Interclube	7	2	0.3
3	(Kenya) USIU Flames	5	1	0.2
4				
5				
7				
8				
9				
10				

Turnovers

Rank	Name	G	Tos	TPG
1	(Togo) Étoile Filante	5	157	31.4
2	(Kenya) USIU Flames	5	138	27.6
3	(Cameroon) FAP Yaoundé	7	180	25.7
4	(Algeria) GS Pétroliers	7	175	25
5	(Mozambique) A Politécnica	7	171	24.4
6	(Mozambique) Ferroviário de Maputo	7	170	24.3
7	(Nigeria) First Bank	7	149	21.3
8	(Angola) 1º de Agosto	7	142	20.3
9	(Kenya) K.P.A.	7	142	20.3
10	(Angola) Interclube	7	140	20

2-point field goal percentage

Pos	Name	%
1	(Angola) 1º de Agosto	68.1
2	(Angola) Interclube	62.3
3	(Algeria) GS Pétroliers	61.5
4	(Cameroon) FAP Yaoundé	57.2
5	(Nigeria) First Bank	55.3
6	(Mozambique) Ferroviário de Maputo	55
7	(Togo) Étoile Filante	54.5
8	(Kenya) K.P.A.	47.9
9	(Mozambique) A Politécnica	45.5
10	(Kenya) USIU Flames	44.1

3-point field goal percentage

Pos	Name	%
1	(Mozambique) Ferroviário de Maputo	42.9
2	(Angola) 1º de Agosto	41.8
3	(Angola) Interclube	39.8
4	(Nigeria) First Bank	39.5
5	(Algeria) GS Pétroliers	33.3
6	(Mozambique) A Politécnica	31.4
7	(Kenya) USIU Flames	30
8	(Cameroon) FAP Yaoundé	28.2
9	(Kenya) K.P.A.	23.5
10	(Togo) Étoile Filante	23.1

Free throw percentage

Pos	Name	%
1	(Nigeria) First Bank	77.2
2	(Angola) Interclube	71.1
3	(Mozambique) Ferroviário de Maputo	67.6
4	(Cameroon) FAP Yaoundé	62.5
5	(Angola) 1º de Agosto	61.7
6	(Mozambique) A Politécnica	56.7
7	(Kenya) K.P.A.	56.1
8	(Algeria) GS Pétroliers	55.8
9	(Togo) Étoile Filante	54.2
10	(Kenya) USIU Flames	51.1

=== Team Game highs ===
Department	Name	Total	Opponent
Points	(Angola) 1º de Agosto	98	(Kenya) USIU Flames
Rebounds	(Angola) Interclube	38	(Kenya) K.P.A.
Assists	(Angola) 1º de Agosto	25	(Kenya) USIU Flames
Steals	(Angola) Interclube	26	(Togo) Étoile Filante
Blocks	–	1	–
2-point field goal percentage	(Angola) 1º de Agosto	88% (22/25)	(Algeria) GS Pétroliers
3-point field goal percentage	(Angola) 1º de Agosto	75% (3/4)	(Mozambique) A Politécnica
Free throw percentage	(Nigeria) First Bank	86.1% (31/36)	(Mozambique) A Politécnica
Turnovers	(Togo) Étoile Filante	42	(Angola) Interclube

== All Tournament Team ==
G	(United States)	Sequoia Holmes
G	(Angola)	Italee Lucas
F	(Mozambique)	Anabela Cossa
F	(Mozambique)	Leia Dongue
C	(Democratic Republic of the Congo)	Mireille Nyota

2016 FIBA Africa Women's Clubs Champions Cup winner

Grupo Desportivo Interclube
5th title

Team roster: Angelina Golome, Astrida Vicente, Emanuela Mateus, Felizarda Jorge, Italee Lucas, Luzia Simão, Merciana Fernandes, Nadir Manuel, Ngiendula Filipe, Pauline Nsimbo, Rosemira Daniel, Sequoia Holmes
Head coach: Apolinário Paquete

Most Valuable Player
(United States) Sequoia Holmes

== See also ==
- 2015 FIBA Africa Championship for Women
