= Kate Payne =

American nurse (1957–2021)

- Kate Payne, from a 2009 newspaper photo
- Born: 1957; Denver, Colorado
- Died: January 6, 2021 (aged 63–64); Nashville, Tennessee
- Occupations: Nurse, lawyer, bioethicist

Kate Payne (1957 – January 6, 2021) was an American nurse, lawyer, and bioethicist. She was an associate professor at the Center for Biomedical Ethics and Society at Vanderbilt University Medical Center.

== Early life ==
Payne was born in Denver, Colorado, the daughter of Charles (Chuck) Payne and Doris Payne. She earned a bachelor's degree in biology at Colorado State University in 1979, and a second bachelor's in nursing from Rush University in 1981. She completed a Juris Doctor degree at Pepperdine University School of Law in 1989. She pursued further studies in medical ethics as a fellow at the Pritzker School of Medicine in Chicago in 1993 and 1994.

== Career ==
Payne was Director of Ethics and Palliative Care at St. Thomas Hospital in Nashville, and a clinical bioethicist and associate professor at the Center for Biomedical Ethics and Society at Vanderbilt University. She also held adjunct affiliation at the Center for Biomedical Ethics, Education & Research at Albany Medical College. Payne wrote and taught on healthcare law, end-of-life issues, and careworker burnout. She served on the national advisory board of Americans for Better Care of the Dying (ABCD), and was active in Tennessee End of Life Partnership and the ethics committee of the Alive Hospice. She helped to shape the Tennessee Health Care Decisions Act of 2004, and advised the state of Tennessee on pandemic planning and disaster relief. The Tennessean named her Nurse of the Year in 2009. "Nursing is all about education, advocacy, and human dignity," she explained of her work in 2009. "I am always thinking, 'If I were a patient, what would I want?'"

== Publications ==
Payne's work was published in academic journals including Chest, Critical Care Medicine, Journal of the American Association of Nurse Practitioners, Women and Birth, Journal of Graduate Medical Education, Perspectives on Medical Education, Tennessee Nurse, Pediatrics, AACN Advanced Critical Care, and The Journal of Allergy and Clinical Immunology. Some of her publications are listed below to suggest the breadth of her interests and contributions, including some of her professional journal columns in 2020 about the COVID-19 pandemic.

- "Quality of Dying and Death in Two Medical ICUs: Perceptions of Family and Clinicians" (2005, with Levy, Wesley Ely, Engelberg, Patrick, and Curtis)
- "Ethical Issues Related to Pandemic Flu Planning and Response" (2007)
- "Justifiable deception in everyday practice" (2010, with Wolf and Johnson)
- "Science, healing, and courage: the legacy of Florence Nightingale" (2010)
- "Ethics Empowerment: Deal with Moral Distress" (2011)
- "Facilitators of prenatal care in an exemplar urban clinic" (2016, with Phillippi, Holley, Schorn, and Karp)
- "When Only Family Is Available to Interpret" (2019, with Turnbull, Arenth, Lantos, and Fanning)
- "After the Pandemic: What Do We Know?" (2020)
- "Pandemic: Continued Ethical Obligations" (2020)
- "The Parallel Pandemic: Self Care is No Longer Optional" (2020)
- "Interdisciplinary Ethics Certificate Program for Graduate Medical Education Trainees" (2021, with Thomas, Meador, and Drolet)

== Personal life ==
Payne married Scott Weiss. She died at Alive Hospice from cancer in 2021, aged 63. Kate Payne Clinical Medical Ethics Legacy Fund was established in her memory at Vanderbilt University.
