= Phoenix shooting =

Phoenix shooting may refer to:

- 2005–2006 serial shootings committed by Dale Hausner and Samuel Dieteman
- 2015 Phoenix freeway shootings
- 2010 killing of Ryan Whitaker
- 2010 killing of Dion Johnson
- 2022 Phoenix shooting
