= List of killings by law enforcement officers in the United States, May 2020 =

This is a list of people reported killed by non-military law enforcement officers in the United States in May 2020, whether in the line of duty or not, and regardless of reason or method. The listing documents the occurrence of a death, making no implications regarding wrongdoing or justification on the part of the person killed or officer involved. Killings are arranged by date of the incident that caused death. Different death dates, if known, are noted in the description. The table below lists 80 people.

== May 2020 ==
Date	Name (age) of deceased	Race	State (city)	Description
2020-05-31	Israel Berry (49)	White	Oregon (Portland)	Berry was shot and killed by police responding to a call of a man making threats. According to police statements, during an encounter with Berry, officers shot him.
2020-05-31	Thomas Sutherlin (32)	White	Wisconsin (Watertown)	Sutherlin was shot and killed by police looking to question him about a domestic incident. According to police statements, police confronted Sutherlin during a traffic stop and used a Taser on Sutherlin. The Taser was not effective, and shots were allegedly fired from within Sutherlin's vehicle; the police returned fire and killed him. Sutherlin was transported to a hospital and died from his injuries.
2020-05-30	Derrick Thompson (46)	Black	Florida (Fountain)	Thompson was shot and killed by police intervening between a fight where Thompson shot another man. According to police statements, Thompson shot Kendall Kirkland, 23, from Newville, Alabama, and shot at police when officers tried to intervene. Officers returned fire and shot Thompson; he died at the scene.
2020-05-29	Caleb Rule (37)	White	Texas (Sienna)	Rule, a deputy constable, was accidentally shot and killed as he and sheriff's deputies were clearing a house. Officials say the deputy thought there was a suspect in the house and fired, hitting Rule.
2020-05-29	Terrell Mitchell (34)	Black	Pennsylvania (Philadelphia)	
2020-05-29	Ronnie Kong (32)	Asian	California (San Diego)	Kong was shot during a standoff with the police. The police surrounded Kong's apartment complex after learning he reportedly shot and killed another person during an argument. During the standoff, King allegedly pulled out a handgun and pointed it at the policemen. 3 officers opened fire and killed him.
2020-05-29	Heba Momtaz Al-Azhari (22)	Asian	Florida (Temple Terrace)	Al-Azhari was shot and killed by police when she charged at an officer with a butcher knife outside Temple Terrace City Hall. The Temple Terrace Police Department is investigating the incident.
2020-05-29	Robert Melton Colvin	White	California (Lancaster)	
2020-05-29	Momodou Lamin Sisay (39)	Black	Georgia (Snellville)	Sisay was shot and killed by police trying to pull him over for a vehicle tag violation. According to the Georgia Bureau of Investigation (GBI), Sisay attempted to flee, aimed at a gun at officers, and eventually died after exchange fire with a police SWAT team. Sisay was a Gambian citizen. The GBI is investigating the shooting.
2020-05-29	Jarvis Sullivan (44)	Black	Florida (Yulee)	Sullivan was shot and killed by police trying to arrest him during a drug bust. According to police statements, Sullivan tried to escape the police in his vehicle, and when his vehicle accelerated towards an officer, the officer opened fire and killed Sullivan. The Florida Department of Law Enforcement is investigating the shooting.
2020-05-28	John Benedict Coleman (53)	White	Utah (Ogden)	Coleman was shot and killed by police responding to a report of a domestic threat. According to police statements, police confronted Coleman, who retreated into a house and started shooting, killing one officer. Other officers returned fire and killed Coleman.
2020-05-28	Name Withheld	Unknown race	California (Fontana)	
2020-05-28	Robert Anthony "Jordan" Whitehead (26)	White	Oregon (Portland)	
2020-05-28	Steven Edward Ferguson (31)	White	Colorado (Arapahoe County)	Ferguson was shot and killed by police watching a parked stolen vehicle. According to police statements, Ferguson was seen getting into a stolen vehicle, and officers confronted Ferguson and commanded him to get out of the car. Ferguson did not get out of the car and allegedly presented a "deadly threat," at which point officers shot and killed him. The 18th Judicial District Critical Incident Response Team is investigating the shooting.
2020-05-28	Ruben Smith III (35)	Black	Arkansas (North Little Rock)	Smith was shot and killed by police responding to reports of a man having a gun. According to police statements, Smith was actively shooting his gun near the Rose City Sub-Station and was shot by officers when found. Smith was taken to a local hospital and died June 1, 2020.
2020-05-27	Joshua Blessed (58)	White	New York (Geneseo)	Blessed was shot and killed by police pursuing him about his speeding and reckless driving. According to police statements, officers stopped Blessed for speeding in his tractor-trailer, but Blessed eventually drove away and led officers in a chase across three counties. Blessed allegedly drove recklessly through the chase and fired at police officers; officers fired back after an hour and a half chase, and Blessed was shot and killed.
2020-05-27	Channing Lamar Spivey (34)	White	Alabama (Luverne)	
2020-05-27	Hector Hernandez (31)	Hispanic	California (Fullerton)	Hernandez was shot and killed by police responding to a domestic violence call. According to police statements, officers confronted Hernandez outside a home with a knife and ordered him to drop the knife; Hernandez did not drop the knife and turned to enter the home. The police deployed a K9 on Hernandez, Hernandez stabbed the dog, at which point officers shot him. He was taken to a hospital where he died. The K9 dog is expected to make a full recovery.
2020-05-27	Tony McDade (38)	Black	Florida (Tallahassee)	McDade was identified as a suspect in the murder of a 21-year old African American on the morning of his death. In a Facebook live video, McDade alluded to a potential suicide by cop. Police said McDade fled the scene of the stabbing on foot before officers arrived, but they encountered McDade nearby shortly afterward. According to police, McDade reportedly had a handgun and "made a move consistent with using the firearm" against an officer, prompting the officer to shoot McDade.
2020-05-27	Rommel Mendoza (50)	Hispanic	California (Los Angeles)	Mendoza was shot and killed by police responding to reports of a neighbourhood dispute. According to police reports, officers confronted Mendoza at his home, he armed himself with a sword, and approached officers. Officers did not shoot or kill Mendoza in this first encounter, and Mendoza walked back into his home. After this first encounter, more police officers arrived, including communication officers and an air unit. Mendoza exited his home again, still armed with a sword, and allegedly advanced towards officers. Officers shot Mendoza on this second encounter with non-lethal foam batons, and bullets. Mendoza died at the scene.
2020-05-27	Modesto Reyes (35)	Black	Louisiana (Jefferson Parish)	Reyes was shot and killed by police pursuing Reyes for an unspecified traffic violation. According to police statements, officers pursued Reyes for an unspecified traffic violation after he refused to stop, and he eventually bailed out of the vehicle. Reyes ran and tripped, at which point officers caught up to him. Reyes then allegedly pointed a gun at one of the officers, who shot and killed him.
2020-05-27	Alexander Scott (30)	Unknown	Oklahoma (Wilburton)	Scott was shot and killed by police responding to a report of a man walking while drunk. According to police statements, Scott threw a bottle at an officer's police cruiser, and then stabbed the officer when he got out, at which point the officer shot him. Scott died at the scene.
2020-05-26	John Alvarado (22)	Hispanic	Texas (Corpus Christi)	Alvarado was shot and killed by police responding to a suspected home invasion. According to police statements, officers confronted Alvarado and other suspects during the alleged home invasion, and Alvarado allegedly pulled out a firearm, at which point the officers shot Alvarado. Alvarado was transported to a hospital and died on May 28.
2020-05-26	Robert Avitia (18)	Hispanic	California (Los Angeles)	Avitia was shot and killed by police who pursued him for allegedly shooting at an officer. According to police statements, officers approached a group of people when Avitia produced a handgun, shot at the officers, and ran off. Officers pursued Avitia and shot him when he allegedly pointed a handgun at the officers. Avitia died at the scene.
2020-05-26	Kenneth Bennett (61)	Unknown	New York (Manlius)	Bennett was shot and killed by police responding to reports of domestic assault. According to police statements, police confronted Bennett at a house where he armed himself with a long gun and made various threats at police. Police tried to negotiate with him to put his gun down, but he did not put down his gun and leveled his gun several times. Police also fired non-lethal foam rounds at Bennett, this was not successful. Police did not kill him for at least hour. Eventually Bennett allegedly approached officers with his weapon, at which point state trooper Gary M. Novotny shot Bennett. Bennett was transported to a hospital where he died. Bennett's gun was later identified as a Daisy lever-action BB gun.
2020-05-26	Thomas David Marquez	Hispanic	Colorado (Thornton)	
2020-05-26	Richard Councilman (56)	White	California (Jamestown)	Councilman was shot and killed by police responding to a report of a domestic violence incident. According to police, after police arrived at Councilman's residence, Councilman had a standoff with police for 20 minutes, during which the police did not kill him. After twenty minutes, Councilman left his residence, at which point police fired bean bag rounds at him. Councilman then allegedly aimed a gun at officers, which prompted officers to shoot him. Councilman died at the scene, and his firearm was later discovered to be fake.
2020-05-26	Tracy Drowne (42)	White	Florida (Orange County)	Drowne was shot and killed by police responding to reports that she hit a man in the face. According to police statements, when officers arrived at Drowne's home to confront her about the alleged assault, she came out of her home with a gun and pointed at the officers, who shot her. Drowne was transported to an area hospital where she died.
2020-05-26	John Allen Dunaway III (61)	White	Florida (Jacksonville)	Dunaway was shot and killed by police attempting to help Dunaway after a single-car crash. According to police statements, an officer tried to help Dunaway after a single-car crash, but the officer struggled with Dunaway and shot him twice with a Taser. Afterwards, Dunaway allegedly repeatedly told the officer he had a gun, and ran towards his car, at which point the officer shot. Dunaway died at the scene. JSO searched the car, but could not find a gun. The JSO and the State Attorney’s Office are investigating the shooting. The officer had a body camera, but video from the camera will not be released until all investigations are completed, which could take two years or more.
2020-05-26	Jason Jesse Gallegos (37)	White	Michigan (Lansing)	Gallegos was shot and killed by police responding to reports of a domestic violence incident. According to police statements, when police arrived at the scene Gallegos started shooting at officers, who returned fire and killed him.
2020-05-26	John Vik (47)	Unknown	Ohio (Parma)	Vik was shot and killed by police responding to a report that Vik had pointed a gun at a somebody's head. According to police statements, officers confronted Vik at his home, where he had barricaded himself, and tried to convince Vik to surrender himself. Vik allegedly walked out of his home eventually and shot at police, who fired back and killed him. The Ohio Attorney General’s Bureau of Criminal Investigation is investigating the shooting.
2020-05-25	Joe Louis Castillanos (38)	Hispanic	Texas (Houston)	Castillanos was shot and killed by police on a weapon/welfare check responding to reports of Castillanos as a suicide threat. According to police, police confronted Castillanos armed with a gun walking on the street and ordered him to drop his weapon, instead Castillanos fired at the ground and then allegedly pointed the gun at the officers, at which point the officers shot and killed him. Castillanos died at the scene.
2020-05-25	Gary P. Dorton (43)	Unknown	Tennessee (Jonesborough)	Dorton was shot and killed by police responding to reports that a man was threatening to harm himself and a relative. According to police statements, police confronted Dorton sitting on a front porch with a large knife. Dorton allegedly charged at one of the officers, who shot him. Dorton died at the scene. The Tennessee Bureau of Investigation is investigating the shooting.
2020-05-25	Reymar Gagarin (35)	Native Hawaiian or Pacific Islander	California (Modesto)	Gagarin was shot and killed by police responding to an unrelated call. According to police statements, Gagarin approached a police cruiser with a gun, the cruiser drove a distance away, and officers exited the cruiser to confront Gagarin. When officers got out of the cruiser, Gagarin allegedly pointed the gun at the officers, who shot Gagarin. Gagarin was taken to a hospital, where he was pronounced dead. Gagarin's gun was later determined to be fake.
2020-05-25	George Floyd (46)	Black	Minnesota (Minneapolis)	Four police officers responding to a "forgery in progress" detained Floyd, who refused to get into the police car. During an altercation, Derek Chauvin, a police officer, was kneeling on Floyd's neck for 9 minutes and 29 seconds. Floyd repeatedly told the officers "please" and "I can't breathe." Bystanders urged the officers to let Floyd up as he went quiet and stopped moving. With Chauvin's knee still on Floyd's neck, Alexander Keung, one of the responding police officers, checked Floyd's wrist for a pulse but could not feel one. Once Chauvin removed his knee, Floyd was unresponsive. Moments later, an ambulance took Floyd to the Hennepin County Medical Center. George Floyd was pronounced dead about an hour later. The day following the incident, the Minneapolis Police Department fired all four officers, including Derek Chauvin. On May 29, Chauvin is charged with second-degree unintentional murder and second-degree manslaughter and the three other responding officers are charged with aiding and abetting second-degree murder and manslaughter. On April 20, 2021, Chauvin was convicted on all three counts in the murder of George Floyd.
2020-05-25	Dion Johnson (28)	Black	Arizona (Phoenix)	A Phoenix Police trooper approached the vehicle and found Johnson asleep at the drivers seat, with cans of beer and a gun in the car, after removing the gun the trooper attempted to arrest Johnson. An altercation occurred when Johnson woke up and grabbed at the officer, the officer drew his weapon to have Johnson comply with instructions but fired at Johnson after he apparently lunged for the weapon.
2020-05-25	Justin Mink (33)	Unknown	Texas (League City)	Mink was shot and killed by police on patrol in a parking lot. According to police statements, an officer on patrol met Mink and a woman in a truck in a parking lot and discovered that the woman had an outstanding warrant. As the officer approached Mink, Mink allegedly produced a knife and slashed at the officer. The knife allegedly cut the officer's shirt and bulletproof fest. The officer then shot Mink. Mink was then taken to a hospital and died. The Galveston County Sheriff is investigating the shooting.
2020-05-24	Anthony Grove (52)	Unknown	Montana (Flathead County)	Grove was shot and killed by police responding to a report of a disturbance involving a gun. According to police statements, police confronted Grove, who was armed with a weapon, outside a house for several hours. Eventually, Grove allegedly began shooting at the officers, who returned fire and killed him.
2020-05-24	Chad Burnett (49)	White	Colorado (Colorado Springs)	
2020-05-23	Christopher Clark (26)	Unknown	New Jersey (Paterson)	Clark was shot and killed by police responding to reports of gunshots. According to police statements, officers arrived at the scene, encountered Clark, and shot him for some reason. Clark died at the scene. Officers recovered a gun near Clark, but did not state that Clark owned the gun, or reported that he fired the gun.
2020-05-23	Maurice Gordon Jr. (28)	Black	New Jersey (Bass River Township)	NJ State Trooper Randall Wetzel stopped Maurice Gordon Jr. for speeding on the Garden State Parkway at 6:30 in the morning. During the stop Gordon was asked to move his vehicle to the right shoulder, but could not start the car. With his window down and the vehicle disabled, Gordon asked to sit in the trooper’s SUV, likely because of the biting flies surrounding both vehicles on the edge of the salt marsh. While in the back of Wetzel’s vehicle waiting for a tow truck to arrive, Gordon was offered a face mask for his ride in the tow truck. As Wetzel opened the door to hand Gordon a face mask, Gordon fled from the vehicle and wrestled with Wetzel on the shoulder of the Parkway. During the altercation, Gordon was sprayed with pepper spray and shot with six bullets from Wetzel’s service weapon.
2020-05-23	Bernardo Palacios-Carbajal (22)	Hispanic	Utah (Salt Lake City)	Called in on a report of a gun threat, police officers pursued Palacios-Carbajal from a local motel for several city blocks, during which he stumbled and fell multiple times. After the third fall, Palacios-Carbajal collected a dropped item from the ground —police say it was a gun— and resumed running away as police officers began firing. At least 28 shots were fired by police, at least eighteen of which were fired after Palacios-Carbajal fell to the ground, who had not fired in return. Police said a weapon was found near him after he was shot.
2020-05-23	Gary Kevin Partin (57)	White	Kentucky (Bell County)	Partin was shot and killed by police attempting to stop Partin in a traffic stop. According to police statements, an officer tried to stop Partin in a traffic stop, because Partin showed a firearm. Partin did not stop, so the officer shot and killed him.
2020-05-21	Willie Lee Quarles Sr. (60)	Black	South Carolina (Greenwood)	
2020-05-21	Adam Salim Alsahli (20)	Asian	Texas (Corpus Christi)	
2020-05-21	Casey Dunnigan	Unknown race	Mississippi (Oxford)	
2020-05-21	William Johnson Jr. (48)	Black	Tennessee (Nashville)	
2020-05-21	Ryan Whitaker (40)	White	Arizona (Phoenix)	Police were called to Whitaker's apartment following a noise complaint. After police knocked on his door, Whitaker opened it holding a gun. While getting onto his knees and putting his left hand behind his back, one of the officers shot him twice.
2020-05-20	Tobby LaRon Wiggins (45)	Black	Alabama (Atmore)	
2020-05-20	Stoney Ramirez	Hispanic	California (Hayward)	
2020-05-20	Name Withheld	Unknown race	Florida (Viera)	
2020-05-19	Wilbon Cleveland Woodard (69)	White	Florida (Tallahassee)	Police were called to an altercation at a restaurant parking lot. According to the police report, they encountered Woodard with a gun, at which point he was shot dead.
2020-05-18	Wyatt Maser (23)		Idaho (Bonneville County)	Maser, a Bonneville County Sheriff's Deputy, was responding to a woman with a machete on a rural road. During the apprehension, another sheriff's deputy accidentally struck Maser, killing him. The woman was later charged with manslaughter in connection with Maser's death.
2020-05-16	Robert Johnson Jr. (29)		Maryland (Essex)	Police responded to a "a nuisance related to a large crowd of people" at the Cove Village Townhomes. Johnson had dented a car while parking at there and he had offered to pay for repairs as reported by his family, but the conversation escalated, which led to the neighbor calling police. When police arrived, Johnson exited his vehicle and a gun fell out, after which the officer shot him. Johnson was taken to the hospital where he later died. A second unarmed bystander was shot, but not killed in the incident.
2020-05-12	Christopher Curro (25)	White	New York (Farmingdale)	An NYPD officer was indicted on charges of murder, manslaughter, and menacing after he allegedly shot and killed longtime friend Christopher Curro with his service weapon five times.
2020-05-12	Gregory Howe (37)	White	Florida (Deltona)	An officer pulled over Howe for not wearing a seat-belt, subsequently Howe's license was found to be invalid. After being instructed to leave his truck, Howe fled in the vehicle. Three additional officers pursued Howe until he pulled over and fired a shotgun in their direction. The officers responded by firing 82 rounds, striking Howe 14 times, killing him. The four deputies were uninjured.
2020-05-08	Adrian Medearis (48)	Black	Texas (Houston)	Medearis, a gospel choir director, was driving more than 90 mph (140 km/h) and talking on the phone when he was pulled over by police. Arrested for suspected DWI, Medearis initiated a "violent struggle" while being handcuffed, and was tasered. When Medearis grabbed the officers taser, he was shot dead.
2020-05-07	McHale Rose (19)	Black	Indiana (Indianapolis)	Indianapolis police fatally shot Rose after responding to an early-morning emergency call about a home burglary. According to police statements, four officers came under fire upon arrival, and shot and killed the shooter. The police department claims that the call was made by Rose himself to lure the officers into an ambush, and that there was no burglary and Rose had no connection to the house at the address.
2020-05-06	Ashlynn Lisby (23)		Indiana (Indianapolis)	An Indianapolis police vehicle hit and killed Lisby on an I-465 highway onramp. Lisby was wearing dark clothing and walking in the street. The section of road has no sidewalk or crosswalk, and police reported that the street light was broken. Lisby was pregnant, and her fetus did not survive.
2020-05-06	Dreasjon Reed (21)	Black	Indiana (Indianapolis)	Reed (also known as "Sean") was driving when police attempted to stop him, but Reed proceeded to lead police on a high-speed chase. Reed eventually got out of the car and attempted to flee. According to police, a taser was unsuccessfully deployed before Reed and the police exchanged gunfire. A distinctive, customized Glock handgun that was featured in several of Reed's posts on social media was found near his body at the scene. The shooting achieved notoriety for the fact that Reed live-streamed most of the incident, including the chase and his death, on Facebook, which included an officer making an inappropriate comment after Reed was shot and killed.
2020-05-06	William Jennette (48)		Tennessee (Lewisburg)	Marshall County jailers requested police backup after Jennette refused to get into a restraint chair. Officers held Jennette down, and he died at the scene. An autopsy ruled the death a homicide with asphyxia as a contributing cause of death.
2020-05-05	Qavon Webb (23)	Black	Missouri (St. Louis)	Qavon Webb was shot by Officer Brendan McGahan. Dashcam footage shows McGahan pulling over Webb, and Webb getting out and shooting McGahan 6 times, and then trying to tackle him. McGahan fired 13 bullets into Webb, killing him. McGahan was taken to the hospital where he recovered.
2020-05-04	Ronal Zendejas (36)	Hispanic	Nevada (Sparks)	
2020-05-04	Mark Anthony Jones (36)	Hispanic	California (Monterey Park)	
2020-05-04	Demontre Bruner (21)	Black	Oklahoma (Muskogee)	
2020-05-03	Tyler Wayne Kracht (28)	Unknown race	Colorado (Hillrose)	
2020-05-03	Armando Salvatierra (26)	Hispanic	California (San Jose)	
2020-05-03	Michael Faries (69)	White	Indiana (Oakland City)	
2020-05-03	Michael Ferguson (54)	White	Florida (Fort Lauderdale)	
2020-05-03	Chad Russell Adams (43)	White	Texas (Boerne)	
2020-05-03	Phillip Michael Carney (38)	White	Kansas (Overland Park)	
2020-05-03	Jesus Estrada Leon	Hispanic	California (Fullerton)	
2020-05-03	Filipe Pereira	White	Florida (Jacksonville)	
2020-05-03	Kortney Shawn Price (44)	White	North Carolina (Linville)	
2020-05-01	Spencer Gregory Calvert (21)	White	Indiana (Portland)	
2020-05-01	Said Joquin (26)	Black	Washington (Lakewood)	
2020-05-01	Brent D'Andrew Martin (32)	Black	Arkansas (Little Rock)	
2020-05-01	Unnamed person	Unknown race	Florida (Hialeah)	
2020-05-01	Nicholas Peter Bils (36)	White	California (San Diego)	After being transported to jail on an assault charge, Bils escaped by slipping his hand out of his handcuffs and opening a jail door. When he ran down a street, two sheriff's deputies noticed him. One of them, Aaron Russell, fired at Bils, shooting him several times in the back. Russell was charged with second degree murder.
2020-05-01	William Lamont Debose (21)	Black	Colorado (Denver)	

== See also ==
- Death in custody § United States
- Henry A. Wallace Police Crime Public Database
- List of cases of police brutality
- List of countries with annual rates and counts for killings by law enforcement officers
- List of law enforcement officers killed in the line of duty in the United States
- List of law enforcement officers convicted for an on-duty killing in the United States
- List of shootings by US immigration agents
- List of police reforms related to the George Floyd protests
- List of unarmed African Americans killed by law enforcement officers in the United States
- Lists of killings by law enforcement officers
- Police brutality in the United States
- Police misconduct § United States
- Police riot § United States
- Police use of deadly force in the United States
