= North Riverside, Illinois =

- Village
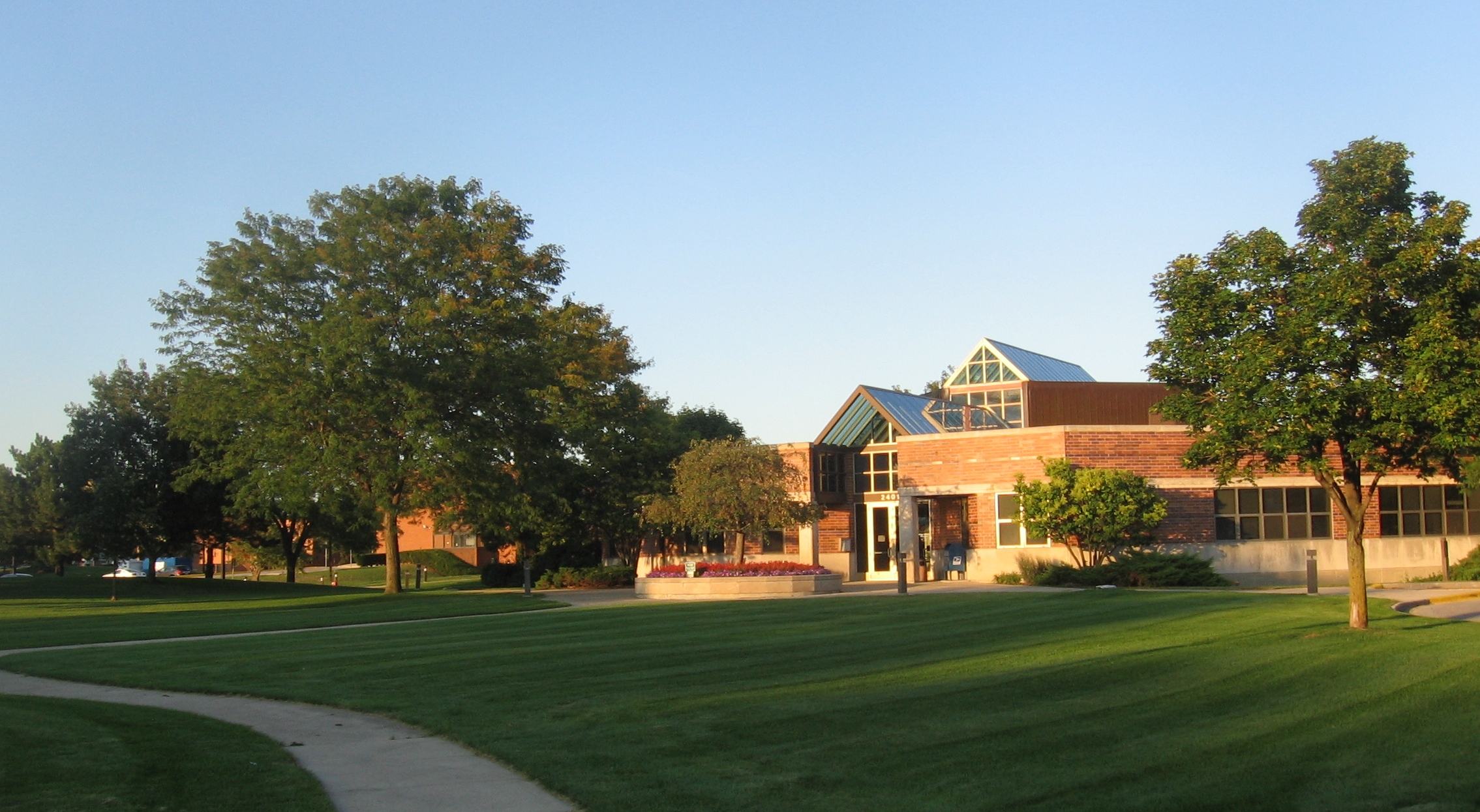
- North Riverside Village Commons, which houses village offices and a recreation center.

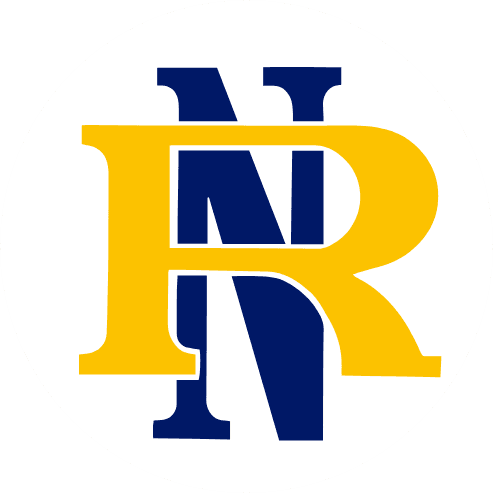
- Seal
- Motto: "A Small Community With A Big Heart"
- Location of North Riverside in Cook County, Illinois.

- Location within Greater Chicago Location within Illinois Location within the United States
- Coordinates: 41°50′46″N 87°49′47″W
- Country: United States
- State: Illinois
- County: Cook

Government
  - Mayor: Joseph Mengoni

Area
  - Total: 1.64 sq mi (4.26 km^{2})
  - Land: 1.64 sq mi (4.26 km^{2})
  - Water: 0 sq mi (0.00 km^{2})

Population (2020)
  - Total: 7,426
  - Density: 4,518.1/sq mi (1,744.46/km^{2})
- Time zone: UTC-6 (CST)
  - Summer (DST): UTC-5 (CDT)
- ZIP Code(s): 60546
- Area code: 708
- FIPS code: 17-54144
- Website: www.northriverside-il.org

North Riverside is a village in Cook County, Illinois, United States. As of the 2020 census, it had a population of 7,426.

== Geography ==
North Riverside is located at 41°50′46″N 87°49′47″W (41.846222, -87.829585).

According to the 2021 census gazetteer files, North Riverside has a total area of 1.64 square miles (4.25 km^{2}), all land.

== Demographics ==
Historical population
Census	Pop.	Note	%±
1930	969		—
1940	1,036		6.9%
1950	3,230		211.8%
1960	7,989		147.3%
1970	8,097		1.4%
1980	6,764		−16.5%
1990	6,005		−11.2%
2000	6,688		11.4%
2010	6,672		−0.2%
2020	7,426		11.3%
U.S. Decennial Census

=== Racial and ethnic composition ===
North Riverside village, Illinois – Racial and ethnic composition Note: the US Census treats Hispanic/Latino as an ethnic category. This table excludes Latinos from the racial categories and assigns them to a separate category. Hispanics/Latinos may be of any race.
Race / Ethnicity (NH = Non-Hispanic)	Pop 2000	Pop 2010	Pop 2020	% 2000	% 2010	% 2020
White alone (NH)	5,715	4,469	3,810	85.45%	66.98%	51.31%
Black or African American alone (NH)	197	412	513	2.95%	6.18%	6.91%
Native American or Alaska Native alone (NH)	7	2	15	0.10%	0.03%	0.20%
Asian alone (NH)	173	137	219	2.59%	2.05%	2.95%
Pacific Islander alone (NH)	0	0	0	0.00%	0.00%	0.00%
Other race alone (NH)	4	5	24	0.06%	0.07%	0.32%
Mixed race or Multiracial (NH)	48	59	158	0.72%	0.88%	2.13%
Hispanic or Latino (any race)	544	1,588	2,687	8.13%	23.80%	36.18%
Total	6,688	6,672	7,426	100.00%	100.00%	100.00%

=== 2020 census ===
As of the 2020 census, North Riverside had a population of 7,426. There were 1,681 families residing in the village. The population density was 4,517.03 inhabitants per square mile (1,744.04/km^{2}), and there were 3,012 housing units at an average density of 1,832.12 per square mile (707.39/km^{2}).

The median age was 41.0 years. 22.4% of residents were under the age of 18 and 17.8% were 65 years of age or older. For every 100 females, there were 94.8 males, and for every 100 females age 18 and over, there were 90.1 males age 18 and over.

There were 2,891 households, of which 33.4% had children under the age of 18 living in them. Of all households, 45.8% were married-couple households, 18.4% were households with a male householder and no spouse or partner present, and 30.1% were households with a female householder and no spouse or partner present. About 29.2% of all households were made up of individuals, and 14.7% had someone living alone who was 65 years of age or older.

100.0% of residents lived in urban areas, while 0.0% lived in rural areas.

Of all housing units, 4.0% were vacant. The homeowner vacancy rate was 0.9% and the rental vacancy rate was 5.3%.

=== Income and poverty ===
The median income for a household in the village was $55,879, and the median income for a family was $72,545. Males had a median income of $44,607 versus $41,795 for females. The per capita income for the village was $35,963. About 4.5% of families and 5.8% of the population were below the poverty line, including 4.8% of those under age 18 and 1.3% of those age 65 or over.

== Government ==
North Riverside is divided between three congressional districts. The area east of the Des Plaines River is in Illinois's 3rd congressional district; the area west of 1st Avenue is in the 7th district; the area between 1st Avenue and the river, consisting almost entirely of the western half of the Riverside Golf Club, is in the 4th district.

The Village of North Riverside is governed by a Village President (also referred to a Mayor), Village Clerk, and six Trustees who are all elected to four year terms. The terms are staggered, with elections being held in odd number years. The Mayor and Board of Trustees exercise policy-making and legislative powers of the Village, including adopting ordinances and resolutions, approving the Village's annual appropriation and operating budget and enacting tax levies. In addition, the Village Board receives findings and recommendations from a number of appointed citizen advisory committees.

Name	Title/Position	First elected/Appointed	Term Expires
Joseph Mengoni	President	2021	2029
Deborah Czajka	Village Trustee	Appointed 2013	2027
Antonio “Tony” Santucci	Village Trustee	2023	2027
Sandra Lid	Village Clerk	2025	2029
Terri Sarro	Village Trustee	2017	2029
Jason Bianco	Village Trustee	Appointed 2013	2029
Nicholas Tricoci	Village Trustee	2023	2027
Robert Canas	Village Trustee	2025	2029

An Illinois state appeals court ruled in 2016 that the village must pay into the fire and police pensions. The village had argued that it was unable to contribute to the pension plans because of economic hardship during the Great Recession, which lowered tax revenues. The state Department of Insurance determined that the village had not contributed to its police and firefighter pension funds for several years prior to 2013. The state ordered the village to pay into the pensions, and instead the village filed a lawsuit in Cook County Circuit Court in 2014. The judge ruled against the village, and the village appealed.

== Education ==
North Riverside is split into two educational districts. First Avenue, IL-171, serves as the dividing line. Komarek School District 94 serves the population on the west side of First Avenue and Riverside School District 96 serves the population on the east side of First Avenue.

== Economy ==
=== North Riverside Park Mall ===
North Riverside Park Mall is located at 7501 W. Cermak Road. The mall features three department store anchors as well as 130 specialty shops. In addition, the food court, located at the main entrance to the mall, features local favorites, as well as several chain restaurants.

=== Costco & Edward Don ===
In 2011, Edward Don, a large restaurant supply company, elected to relocate to the Village of Woodridge, citing better tax incentives and issues with the property owners. In March 2013, Costco closed on a deal with North Riverside and the property owners of the vacated Edward Don building. Costco held their grand opening on November 25. The property also has 4 outlots slated to be sold to other companies.

== Transportation ==
Pace and CTA provide bus service connecting North Riverside to destinations across the region.

== Notable persons ==
New York Times bestselling author Chris DeRose.

Bud Light spokes-dog's Spuds MacKenzie, portrayed by dog Honey Tree Evil Eye.

== Notable events ==
=== Fire Department privatization ===
In a letter dated June 19, 2014, to the residents of North Riverside, Mayor Hermanek pitched the idea of contracting the fire department positions to a private contact company, Paramedic Services of Illinois, Inc.. The Village currently contracts with the company to provide paramedic services, but the plan was to contract the fire fighter positions as well. The plan has drawn significant opposition from the Fire Fighters Union Local 2714, as well as village residents, and department supporters.

At the July 24 Special Meeting of the Village Board to adopt the annual appropriation, there was no vote on the privatization proposal, but the Appropriation Ordinance passed by a vote of 4 to 1. The Fiscal Year 2014-2015 (which began May 1, 2014) budget includes slashed salaries for the fire fighters. "The negotiations are not going to go on forever," said Hermanek. "This will be done by the end of the summer."

On September 12, 2014, in a press release from the Village, Mayor Hugh Hermanek stated that he has instructed Village attorney's to file suit with the Cook County Courts, for the right to terminate the Firefighter's Contact, which expired April 30, 2014. The press release in part reads:

The law firm of Odelson & Sterk, the village's attorneys, filed the lawsuit today to affirm that, 'like any other contract between two parties, there is a beginning and an end,' according to Burt Odelson, the firm's lead partner. 'The union's contract with North Riverside expired on April 30, 2014; so, after making six good faith efforts to find a way to build a new contract while also maintaining the village's solvency, the failure to accomplish that requires us to move ahead expeditiously on the privatization plan.'
