= Pepperdine University School of Law =

Law school in Malibu, California, US

Coordinates: 34.04399°N 118.70932°W

Pepperdine Caruso School of Law
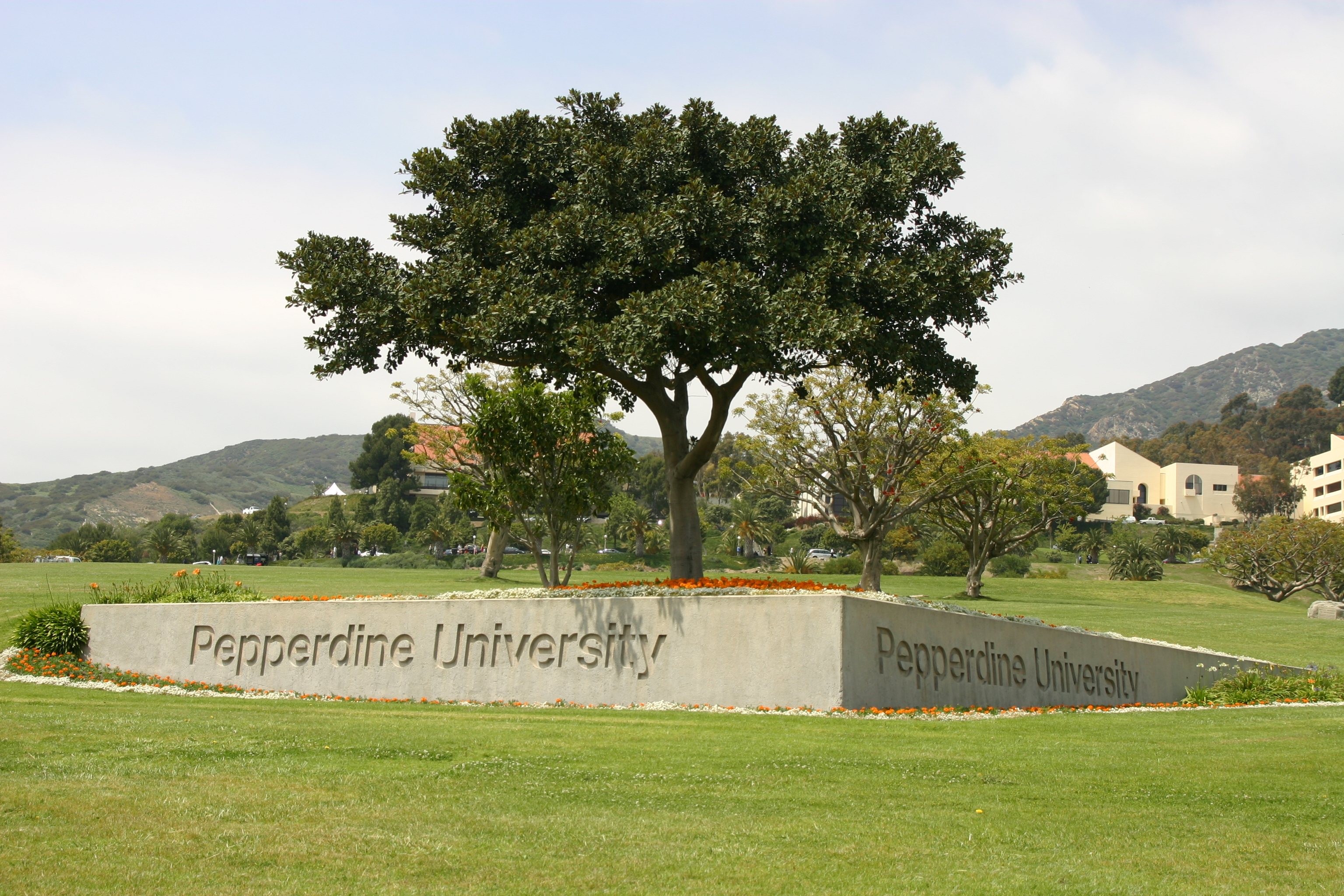
- Parent school: Pepperdine University
- Established: 1969
- School type: Private law school
- Parent endowment: $850 million
- Dean: Paul L. Caron
- Location: Los Angeles County (Malibu post office address), California, United States
- Enrollment: 500
- Faculty: 87
- USNWR ranking: 46th (tie) (2026)
- Bar pass rate: 82% (July 2019 1st time takers)
- Website: law.pepperdine.edu
- ABA profile: Standard 509 Report

The Pepperdine University Rick J. Caruso School of Law is the law school of Pepperdine University, a private research university in Los Angeles County, California.

The school offers the Juris Doctor (JD), and various Masters of Laws (LLM) options in Dispute Resolution, International Commercial Arbitration, United States Law, and Entertainment, Media, and Sports Law. The school also offers joint degrees with its JD and Master of Dispute Resolution (MDR) in partnership with other Pepperdine University graduate schools. The school offers an online Master of Legal Studies program and an online Master of Dispute Resolution program.

On October 23, 2019, Pepperdine announced that the school had received a $50 million gift from billionaire alumnus Rick Caruso that would provide scholarships and loan-forgiveness for needy students. The school would subsequently be known as the Rick J. Caruso School of Law.

== Admissions ==
For the class entering in 2021, the school accepted 24.97% of applicants, with 18.17% of those accepted enrolling. The average class LSAT score was 164 and average undergraduate GPA was 3.8.

== Costs ==
The total cost of attendance, which includes the cost of tuition, fees, and living expenses at Pepperdine Law for the 2017-2018 academic year is $81,260. Assuming no scholarship or tuition discounts, Law School Transparency estimated that the debt-financed cost of attendance for three years would total $305,817.

Pepperdine Law currently participates in the "Yellow Ribbon" program, which matches Veterans' Post-9/11 GI Bill benefits to cover 100% of all costs and fees for veterans who enroll at the law school.

== Accreditation, ranking, and post-graduation employment ==
Accreditation: Pepperdine University School of Law has been accredited by the American Bar Association (ABA) since 1972, holds membership in the Association of American Law Schools (AALS), and is accredited by the Committee of Bar Examiners, State Bar of California.

Rankings: For its 2024 ranking, U.S. News & World Report ranked the school 45th of 196 ABA accredited U.S. law schools.

Employment Outcomes: According to Class of 2019 data from the ABA, 75.3% of graduates obtained full-time, long term positions requiring bar admission (i.e., jobs as lawyers), 9 months after graduation.

== Institutes ==
The School of Law's institutes include: the Parris Institute for Professional Formation; Straus Institute for Dispute Resolution; the Byrne Judicial Clerkship Institute; the Nootbaar Institute on Law, Religion, and Ethics; the Palmer Center for Entrepreneurship and the Law.

Through the Parris Institute, the school pairs students with a practicing attorney or judicial alumni through the students' 1L year. It also provides its students numerous clinics and externship opportunities in the greater Los Angeles area, along with its global justice programs in Uganda and India. Additionally, students have opportunities to study at Pepperdine's London, England, and Washington D.C. campuses.

Pepperdine University School of Law’s Straus Institute for Dispute Resolution provides professional training and academic programs in dispute resolution including a Certificate, Masters in Dispute Resolution (MDR) and Master of Laws in Dispute Resolution (LLM). The Straus Institute provides education to law and graduate students, as well as mid-career professionals in areas of mediation, negotiation, arbitration, international dispute resolution and peacemaking. The Institute has consistently ranked as the number one dispute resolution school in the nation for the past 13 years.

The purpose of the Nootbaar Institute on Law, Religion, and Ethics includes three initiatives:

1. Scholarship with respect to issues at the intersection of law and religion;
2. Domestic Justice Initiatives, such as the Legal Aid Clinic and the Asylum and Refugee Clinic; and
3. the Global Justice Program.

== Sudreau Global Justice Program ==
The Sudreau Global Justice Program has initiatives in international human rights and religious freedom; advancement of the rule of law; and global development. In 2017, Pepperdine Law announced the endowment of the Program made possible by the of alumna Laure Sudreau (JD ’97). The $8 million contribution is the largest single endowment gift ever to the School of Law and will help advance the impact of the Global Justice Program, which operates within the Herbert and Elinor Nootbaar Institute on Law, Religion, and Ethics at the School of Law.

== Journals ==
- Pepperdine Law Review
- Dispute Resolution Law Journal
- Journal of the National Association of Administrative Law Judiciary (NAALJ)
- Journal of Business, Entrepreneurship, and the Law (JBEL)

== Joint degree programs ==
Pepperdine Law offers six joint degrees, which include the JD/MBA, JD/M.Div., JD/Master of Public Policy (MPP), JD/ Master of Dispute Resolution (MDR), MDR/MPP, and MDR/MBA.

== Online programs ==
=== Online Master of Legal Studies Program ===
Pepperdine Law offers a Master of Legal Studies (MLS) degree online with an optional concentration in dispute resolution. The program is designed for non-lawyers who work with the law in some capacity and need a foundation in legal concepts and procedures. Students take courses on contracts, regulatory compliance, civil procedure, and intellectual property, among others. Students meet weekly in live, online classes with Pepperdine Law faculty members to discuss and debate legal topics.

=== Online Master of Dispute Resolution Program ===
The online Master of Dispute Resolution (MDR) program is designed for professionals who want to become more effective leaders and problem solvers by learning to resolve workplace conflict, prevent obstacles, and negotiate complex transactions. All dispute resolution courses are offered through Pepperdine Law's Straus Institute, which was ranked by U.S. News & World Report.

== Notable people ==
=== Deans ===
- Ronald F. Phillips (1970–1997)
- Richardson R. Lynn (1997–2003)
- Charles Nelson (2003–2004)
- Ken Starr (2004–2010)
- Thomas G. Bost (2010–2011)
- Deanell Reece Tacha (2011–2017)
- Paul L. Caron (2017–present)

=== Faculty ===
- Nancy D. Erbe (LLM, JD) — Faculty (2000–2003). Professor of Negotiation, Conflict Resolution & Peacebuilding. Awarded five Fulbright honors including Fulbright Distinguished Chair
- Colleen Graffy — Former United States Deputy Assistant Secretary of State for Public Diplomacy for Europe and Eurasia
- Amb. Douglas Kmiec — Former White House Counsel to Presidents Ronald Reagan and George H.W. Bush, and Former Ambassador to Malta
- Edward Larson — Pulitzer Prize–winning author
- Grant S. Nelson — Specialist in real estate law
- Ken Starr — Former Dean, former D.C. Circuit Court of Appeals Judge, and former United States Solicitor General
- Deanell Reece Tacha — Former Dean and retired Chief Judge of the Tenth Circuit Court of Appeals
- Ben Stein — Former faculty (1990–1997), writer, lawyer, actor, and commentator
- L. Timothy Perrin — Former faculty (1992–2012) and president of Lubbock Christian University (2012–2019)
- Jim Gash — Eighth president of Pepperdine University

=== Visiting faculty ===
- Samuel Alito — Associate Justice of the Supreme Court of the United States
- Akhil Amar — expert in constitutional law, professor at Yale Law School
- Bob Goff — NY Times bestselling author and humanitarian
- Gary Haugen — CEO of the International Justice Mission
- Antonin Scalia — Associate Justice of the Supreme Court of the United States

=== Notable alumni ===
- C. David Baker — President & CEO of the Pro Football Hall of Fame.
- André Birotte Jr., 1991 — United States District Judge in the Central District of California.
- Rod Blagojevich, 1983 — Former Governor of Illinois (2003–2009).
- Raymond Boucher, 1984 — Noted trial attorney.
- Derek Brown, 2000 — Chairman of the Utah Republican Party and former member of the Utah House of Representatives.
- Jeffrey S. Boyd, 1991 — Justice of the Texas Supreme Court, 2012–present.
- Ronald B. Cameron, 1973 — Former Congressman for California's 25th congressional district.
- Rick J. Caruso, 1983 — CEO of Caruso Affiliated.
- Mike Cernovich, 2004 — Political commentator, social media personality, and conspiracy theorist.
- Rich Cho, 1997 — General Manager of the Charlotte Hornets.
- Travis Clardy, 1988 — Member of the Texas House of Representatives, 2012–Present.
- Talis J. Colberg, 1983 — Attorney General of Alaska, 2006–2009.
- Chris DeRose (author), 2004 — New York Times Bestselling Author, law professor, and political strategist.
- Jennifer A. Dorsey, 1997 — United States District Judge for the United States District Court for the District of Nevada.
- Charles R. Eskridge III, 1990 — United States District Judge in the Southern District of Texas.
- James Hahn, 1975 — Mayor of Los Angeles, 2001–2005.
- April Haney — Actress known for her roles in Annie and Charles in Charge.
- Randall Hicks — Adoption attorney, author, and novelist. Winner of the 2006 Gumshoe Award.
- Edward C. Hugler — Acting Secretary of Labor under both Presidents Barack Obama and Donald Trump.
- Faith Ireland, 2005 (Straus Institute Certificate) – Former Justice of the Washington Supreme Court.
- Alan Jackson, 1994 – Criminal defense lawyer noted for the Karen Read trial and defending Harvey Weinstein.
- Candice Jackson, 2002 – Former acting Assistant Secretary of Education for the Office for Civil Rights, Author, Media Figure.
- Brent A. Jones, 1991 — Republican member of the Nevada Assembly.
- Theodore Kanavas — Former member of the Wisconsin State Senate, 2001-2010.
- Lisa Katselas, 1985 - Film Producer and BAFTA Award Nominee
- Mike Leach, 1986 — College football coach at several schools, former head coach at Mississippi State University.
- Rachel Luba, 2016 - Sports agent and founder of Luba Sports.
- Greg Nibert — Member of the New Mexico House of Representatives, 2017–Present.
- Wiley Nickel — Former U.S. congressman from North Carolina.
- Beverly Reid O'Connell, 1990 — United States District Judge for the United States District Court for the Central District of California.
- Geoffrey Palmer — Billionaire real estate developer.
- Kate Payne, 1989 — Bioethicist and professor at Vanderbilt University.
- Amy Peikoff — Chief Policy Officer of Parler. Attended first year at Pepperdine Law before transferring to UCLA.
- Doug Peterson, 1985 — Attorney General of Nebraska, 2015–2023.
- Jason Peterson — Chairman of GoDigital Media Group.
- Todd Russell Platts, 1991 — U.S. Congressman from Pennsylvania, 2001–2013.
- Pierre-Richard Prosper, 1989 — United States Ambassador-at-Large for War Crimes Issues, 2001–2005.
- Michael Reardon – Famous rock climber, and former head of business affairs at Harvey Entertainment.
- Michael Reinstein — Chairman of Regent Private Equity.
- Charles Rettig — Commissioner of Internal Revenue, head of the IRS, 2018–2022.
- Steve Roberts – Missouri State Senator.
- Rachel Rossi — Former counsel to Senator Dick Durbin. Director of the Office for Access to Justice at the United States Department of Justice.
- Meredith Salenger (Straus Institute Certificate) — Actress, vocalist and mediator. Known for her roles in The Journey of Natty Gann, Dream a Little Dream, and as Barriss Offee in Star Wars: The Clone Wars.
- Jenna Sanz-Agero, 1995. — Media executive and former member of the band Vixen.
- Robin Sax, 1997 — Author, legal analyst, and former prosecutor.
- Troy Slaten — Attorney, media pundit, and former child actor in Cagney & Lacey and Parker Lewis Can't Lose.
- Izabella St. James — Reality TV star. Former girlfriend of Hugh Hefner.
- Brian Tucker (MDR) – Businessman and Real Estate Developer.
- Ted Weggeland — California State Assemblyman, 1992-1996.
- Edward Ulloa, 1995 — Prosecutor who handled many of the first internet child sexual predator cases.
- Katie Zacharia, 2011 — political spokesperson and former White House press secretary.
- Ehsan Zaffar, 2007 — Senior government advisor, law professor, and author.

== Honor societies ==
The School of Law attained membership in the Order of the Coif in 2008.

The School of Law has hosted a chapter of The Order of Barristers since 1985.

Pepperdine School of Law is also home to the Prosser Inn of Phi Delta Phi, the International Legal Honor Society. Members must achieve standing in the top thirty percent of their class to be considered for membership.
