= Raymond Boucher =

American trial attorney (born 1957)

- Born: Raymond Paul Boucher; July 31, 1957 (age 69); Tyngsborough, Massachusetts, U.S.
- Education: Fort Lewis College (BA); Colorado State University (MS); Pepperdine University School of Law (JD)
- Occupation: Trial attorney

Raymond Paul Boucher (born July 31, 1957 in Tyngsborough, Massachusetts) is an American trial attorney. Throughout his career, Boucher has represented clients in a wide range of complex civil litigation, including consumer litigation, construction defect litigation, product liability, toxic tort litigation, childhood sexual assault, and employment discrimination. He served as lead attorney for plaintiffs in the landmark $660-million sexual-abuse settlement with the Roman Catholic Archdiocese of Los Angeles, where he represented over 250 abuse victims in the July 2007 settlement. He was able to help secure over one billion dollars in recovery for victims of abuse by Catholic Priests in Southern California. In 2024, Boucher and a team of three other lawyers serving as plaintiffs' leadership counsel secured a second, proposed $880 million settlement with the Roman Catholic Archdiocese of Los Angeles for 1,353 additional survivors of childhood sexual assault by Clergy members.

In 2010, Boucher traveled to Masindi, Uganda where he, and colleagues spearheaded Project Masindi, an operation to help African teenage boys, and girls who were detained in a Ugandan detention center while they awaited trial for accused crimes. In addition to his legal career Boucher is involved with state, and national politics, helping to raise funds and providing strategic analysis for various political campaigns. He was a past president of the Consumer Attorneys of California and of the Consumer Attorneys Association of Los Angeles, and a recipient of the California League of Conservation Voters' award for his work in helping to build a green California for future generations.

== Early life ==
Boucher is the second of eight children. He received his Bachelor of Arts degree with a double major in business administration and political science from Fort Lewis College in 1980, his Master of Science degree in management from Colorado State University in 1981, and his Juris Doctor degree from Pepperdine University School of Law in 1984. He was admitted to the California State Bar in 1984.

During his time at Fort Lewis College in Durango Colorado, he was elected as student body president for two consecutive years, making him the first student to hold the position twice in the school's history. In 2007, Fort Lewis College named him Alumnus of the Year. During his time at Colorado State, Boucher was a member of the Sigma Iota Epsilon and also was a member of the CSV rugby team. After obtaining his management degree, Boucher attended Pepperdine University to work on his Juris Doctor. During his time in law school, Boucher was a member of the Phi Delta Phi honor society and competed in the annual Moot Court competition where he ended up placing first. In 1984, he graduated from Pepperdine and ranked in the top fifteen percentile of his class. He was recognized with the University's Distinguished Alumnus Award in 2002 and serves as a member on the Pepperdine Law School Board of Visitors. In 2005, Boucher was honored with an Honorary Doctor of Law by Whittier College School of Law in Costa Mesa, California.

== Career ==
- Gould & Sayre, Santa Monica, California, Associate (1984 to 1985)
- Sayre, Moreno, Purcell & Boucher, Los Angeles, California, Managing Partner (1985 to 1990)
- Nordstrom, Steele, Nicolette & Jefferson, Los Angeles, California, Attorney of Counsel (1993 to 1996)
- The Law Offices of Raymond Boucher, Tarzana, California, Partner (1990 to 1999)
- Kiesel, Boucher & Larson LLP, Beverly Hills, California, Partner (1999 to 2013)
- Khorrami Boucher Sumner Sanguinetti, LLP, Los Angeles, California, Partner (2013–2014)
- Boucher, LLP, Woodland Hills, California, Partner (2014–Present)

He has been recognized as a Top Leading Lawyer in America by Lawdragon and named Trial Lawyer of the Decade by the Los Angeles Daily Journal.

=== Notable Cases ===
Burton v. Carrey (2018) Resolved wrongful death lawsuits filed against actor.

Callahan v. Gibson, Dunn & Crutcher LLP (2011) 194 Cal. App. 4th 557. Represented family members in suit against law firm that drafted a partnership agreement which damaged the family business.

Harrell v. 20th Century Ins. Co., 934 F.2d 203 (9th Cir. 1991). Suit to recover for fraud in the sale of a small business.

Ileto v. Glock, Inc., 421 F. Supp. 2d 127 (C.D. Cal. 2006). Action against weapons manufacturers Glock and China North, whose firearms were used by a member of the Aryan Nation to shoot several children and kill a postal worker.

Quesada v. Herb Thyme Farms, Inc. 62 Cal.4th 298 (2015) California Supreme Court determines state law claims brought by consumers alleging produce is being intentionally mislabeled as organic are not preempted by federal law.

Ramirez v. Fox Television Station, 998 F.2d 743 (9th Cir. 1993). Suit involving unconstitutional employment discrimination based upon national origin.

Regents of University of California v. Superior Court (2010) 183 Cal. App. 4th 755. Represented relatives of decedents who willed their bodies to a medical school for research and teaching purposes, and who learned that UCLA improperly disposed of the decedents’ remains in a grotesque and undignified manner after scientific uses were concluded. Donors were told that after use, their remains would be cremated and scattered in a rose garden. Human remains were commingled with other remains and incompletely incinerated, leaving hair and flesh intact. Remains were placed in a mixture of incinerated human bodies, laboratory animal carcasses, and medical waste into garbage dumpsters and then transported to a landfill where they were disposed of with common refuse.

Rippon v. Bowen (2008) 160 Cal. App. 4th 1308. Case on behalf of California citizens who challenged the constitutionality of Proposition 140, which imposed lifetime term limits upon state legislators and other state officers.

Santillan v. Roman Catholic Bishop of Fresno (2008) 163 Cal. App. 4th 4. Case on behalf of a victim of childhood sexual abuse.

Shirk v. Vista Unified School District (2007) 42 Cal. 4th 201. Case to recover for sexual molestation by a public school teacher.

Southern California Gas Leak Cases, California JCCP 4861 Co-led environmental litigation on behalf of thousands of residents impacted by gas leak in the Porter Ranch, California area, resulting in landmark $1.8 billion settlement in 2021.

Wallace v. City of Los Angeles (1993) 12 Cal. App. 4th 1385. Demetria Wallace, a teenaged honors student, was shot and killed by a shotgun blast as she sat on a bench waiting for a bus five days before she was to testify against a man accused of fatally shooting a taxi driver. Mr. Boucher spent five years preparing the lawsuit before it went to trial. After a week the trial judge took the case out of the jury's hands and granted a nonsuit in the city's favor. The plaintiff then won an appeals court ruling that the police had a duty to warn her daughter and remanded. The City settled on the eve of trial. The case affirmed the government's responsibility to protect citizens who jeopardize their lives by stepping forward as witnesses to crimes, and prompted changes in police procedures that have saved other witnesses’ lives since.

Wholesale Electricity Antitrust Cases I & II (2007) 147 Cal. App. 4th 1293, JCCP 4204-00005 and 4204-00006. Co-lead counsel in suit to recover from energy traders for antitrust and unfair business practices in the wake of the deregulation of California's energy sector. Resolved in conjunction with the Attorney General's office for over $1.1 billion.

$660 million sexual abuse settlement with the Catholic Archdiocese of Los Angeles. Mr. Boucher was the lead attorney in the $660 million sexual abuse settlement with the Archdiocese of Los Angeles.

Lawsuit against Juul. A lawsuit filed with the Santa Barbara Court alleges that Juul failed to issue warnings or remove their products from the market due to health risks.

=== Awards ===
- Super Lawyers, Southern California
- 500 Leading Lawyers in America 2009-2014, Lawdragon

== Affiliations ==
- American Association for Justice, Diplomat, State of California Delegate Member
