= 2022 Maricopa County Attorney special election =

- November 8, 2022
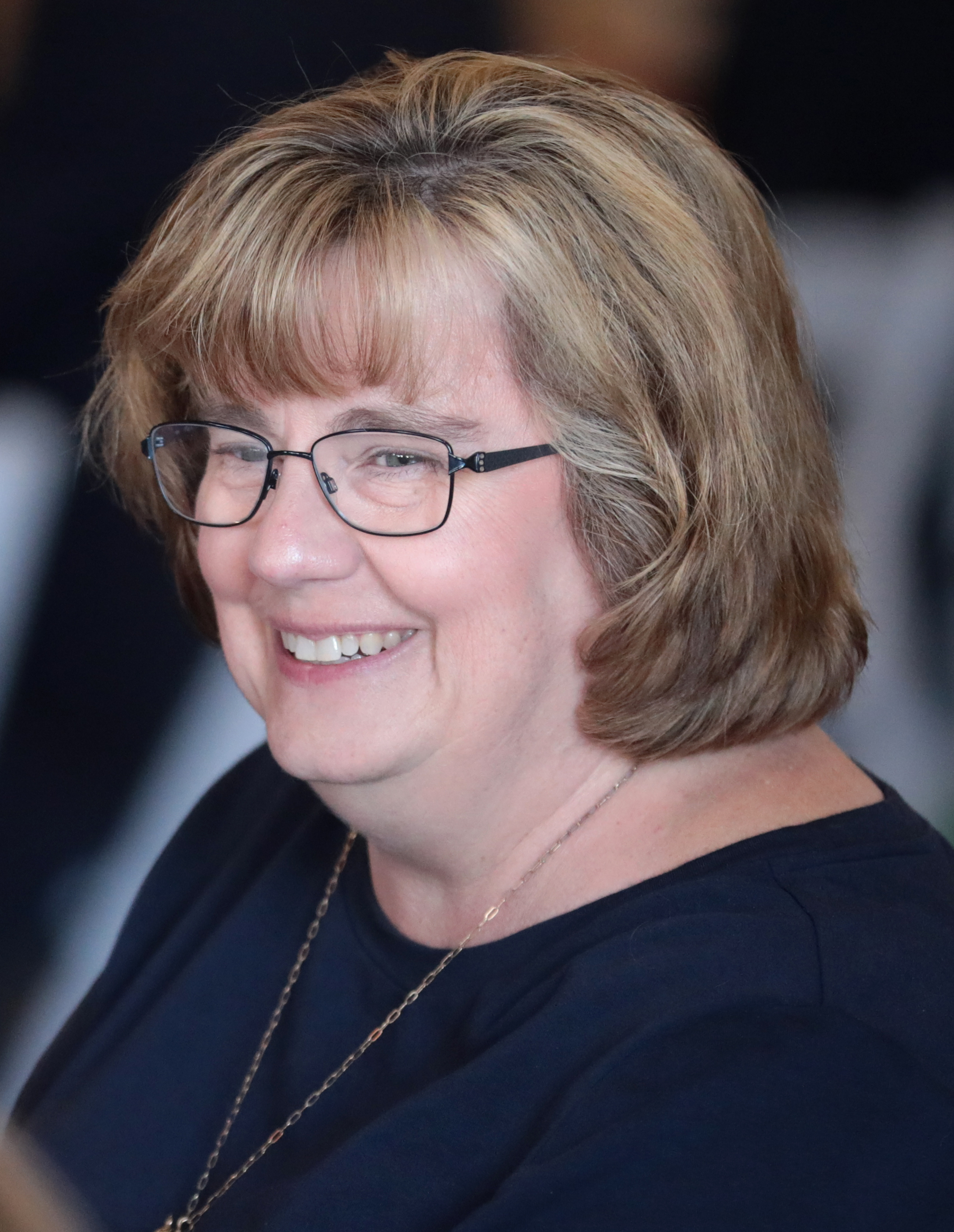

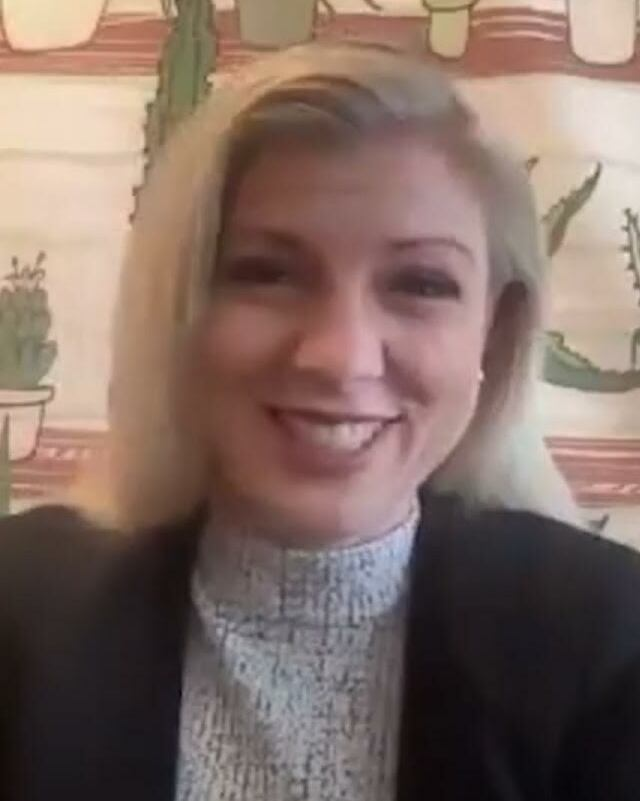
Candidate	Rachel Mitchell	Julie Gunnigle
Party	Republican	Democratic
Popular vote	768,931	686,250
Percentage	52.8%	47.2%
County Attorney before election
Rachel Mitchell
Republican
Elected County Attorney
Rachel Mitchell
Republican

The 2022 Maricopa County Attorney special election took place on November 8, 2022, to elect the County Attorney for Maricopa County, Arizona. The election was held concurrently with other federal and state elections, as well as a special election for District 2 on the Maricopa County Board of Supervisors. The special election was called due to the resignation of Allister Adel in March 2022.

The primary occurred on August 2, 2022. The general election occurred on November 8, 2022. Incumbent Rachel Mitchell defeated 2020 nominee Julie Gunnigle with 52.8% of the vote.

== Background ==
The office of Maricopa County Attorney had undergone leadership turmoil since the election of Andrew Thomas in 2004. Thomas resigned in 2010 amid controversy eventually leading to his disbarment. Bill Montgomery then defeated former County Attorney Rick Romley in the 2010 special election. After Montgomery was controversially appointed to the Arizona Supreme Court, Allister Adel was appointed County Attorney in 2019. She was elected to a full term in 2020, defeating Democrat Julie Gunnigle with 46.45% of the vote. Adel announced her resignation in March 2022 amid numerous controversies.

On April 20, 2022, the Maricopa County Board of Supervisors appointed Rachel Mitchell as the interim county attorney.

The timing of Adel's resignation was significant. If she had resigned two weeks later, the appointed interim attorney would have served until the 2024 election. Candidates had just 13 days to meet the qualification deadline by gathering and submitting approximately 4,000 valid signatures by April 4.

== Republican primary ==
=== Nominee ===
- Rachel Mitchell, appointed incumbent

=== Eliminated in primary ===
- Gina Godbehere, Goodyear city prosecutor

=== Withdrew ===
- Anni Foster, general counsel to Governor Doug Ducey
- James Austin Woods, attorney and son of former Arizona Attorney General Grant Woods

=== Results ===
Republican primary results
Party	Candidate	Votes	%
Republican	Rachel Mitchell (incumbent)	235,299	57.1
Republican	Gina Godbehere	175,137	42.5
Write-in		1,704	0.4
Total votes		412,140	100.0

== Democratic primary ==
=== Nominee ===
- Julie Gunnigle, legal director for Poor People's Campaign Arizona and nominee in 2020

=== Results ===
Democratic primary results
Party	Candidate	Votes	%
Democratic	Julie Gunnigle	312,331	99.5
Write-in		1,461	0.5
Total votes		313,792	100.0

== General election ==
2022 Maricopa County Attorney special election
Party	Candidate	Votes	%
Republican	Rachel Mitchell (incumbent)	776,615	52.83%
Democratic	Julie Gunnigle	692,217	47.09%
Write-in		1,167	0.08%
Total votes		1,469,999	100.0
