= Rachel Mitchell =

Maricopa County Attorney (born 1967)

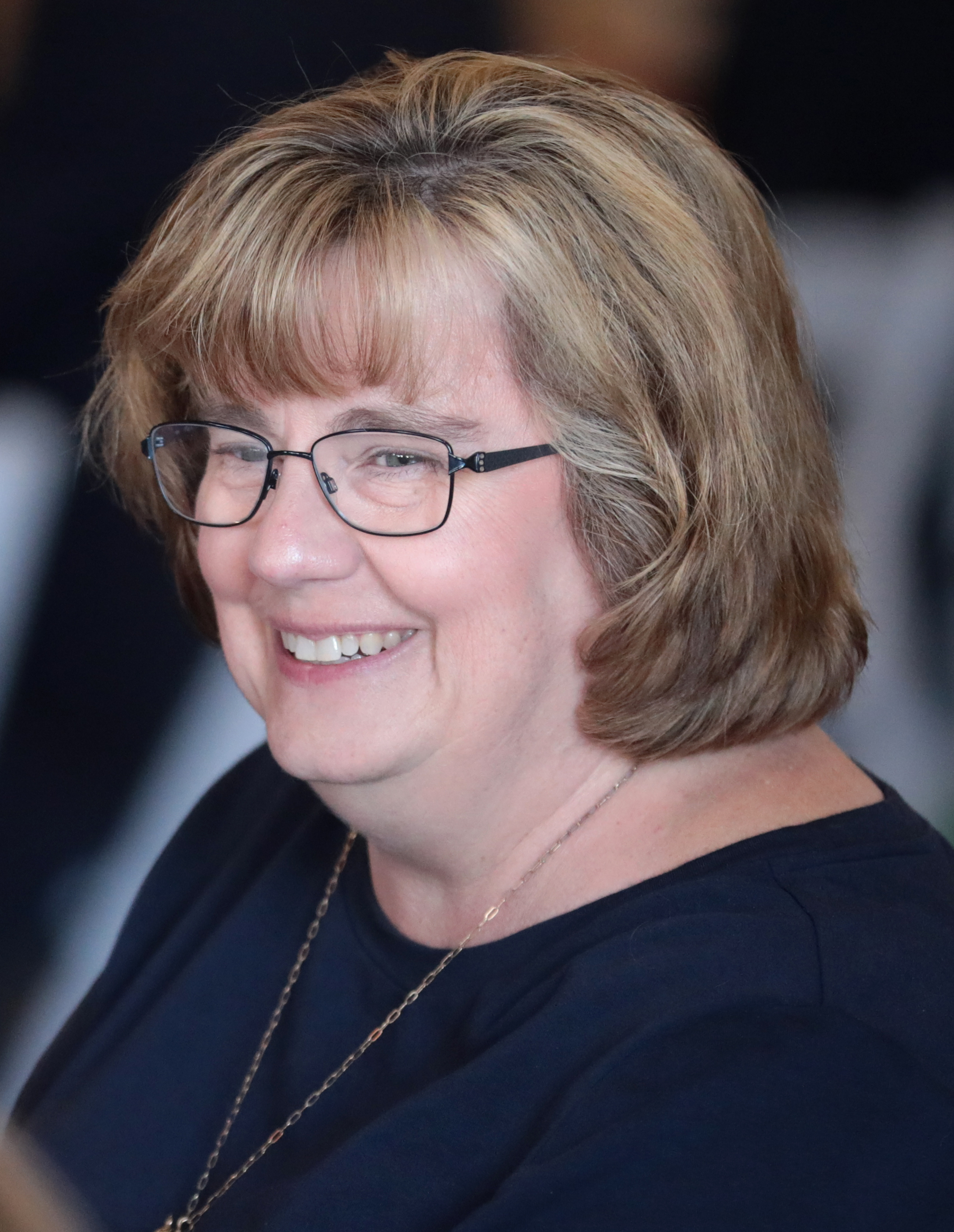

County Attorney of Maricopa County
- Incumbent
- Assumed office April 20, 2022
- Preceded by: Allister Adel
- In office September 5, 2019 – October 3, 2019; Acting
- Preceded by: Bill Montgomery
- Succeeded by: Allister Adel

Personal details
- Born: Rachel Hope Mitchell; 1967 (age 58–59) Phoenix, Arizona, U.S.
- Party: Republican
- Education: Grand Canyon University (BS); Arizona State University (JD)

Rachel Hope Mitchell (born 1967) is an American attorney serving as the county attorney for Maricopa County, Arizona since April 2022. She was appointed to the position following the resignation of Allister Adel and won the 2022 special election. She was reelected to a 4 year term in 2024. In 2019, she briefly served as the acting county attorney after the appointment of Bill Montgomery to the Arizona Supreme Court. Previously, she was the chief deputy county attorney, and chief of the Special Victims Division.

In 2018, Mitchell rose to national prominence when she was requested by the Senate Judiciary Committee to serve as nomination investigative counsel and question both Christine Blasey Ford and Brett Kavanaugh on September 27, 2018, during Kavanaugh's widely publicized confirmation hearings for Associate Justice of the Supreme Court of the United States.

== Early life and education ==
Mitchell is a first-generation Arizonan whose father grew up on a farm in Arkansas and whose mother grew up in a small town in Pennsylvania. Mitchell attended Arizona State University in 1985, took a course at Phoenix College in the summer of 1987, and got a Bachelor of Science degree from Grand Canyon College (later Grand Canyon University). She earned her J.D. degree in 1992 from the ASU's College of Law.

Mitchell worked at the Arizona Capitol Times newspaper in the late 1980s. She interviewed candidates running for elected office and wrote summaries of decisions by the courts. Mitchell later worked as adjunct faculty at Grand Canyon University, where she taught a three-credit course on the court system.

== Legal career ==
Mitchell has been a registered member of the Arizona bar since 1992. In 2003, Mitchell was recognized by Arizona Governor Janet Napolitano as "Outstanding Arizona Sexual Assault Prosecutor of the Year." She was promoted to bureau chief of the sex crimes and family violence bureaus in the east valley office in 2000. In 2005, she became the bureau chief over the main sex crimes bureau in the downtown office. She served in this capacity until 2017, when she was promoted to division chief over the sex crimes and family violence bureaus.

In 2014, a commission recommended her as a possible judicial candidate in Arizona. Mitchell has overseen and assisted in prosecuting some high-profile sexual assault cases in Arizona, including ones against school personnel, law enforcement, and members of clergy. Her most prominent case was the 2005 conviction of Rev. Paul LeBrun. In her position in the Maricopa County Attorney's Office, she has advocated and lobbied to strengthen sex assault laws in the state and has pushed for changes in the courtroom to comfort victims testifying in abuse cases. Mitchell made headlines in 2016 after allowing a golden retriever mix named Sam to assist children when they were testifying about traumatic episodes.

=== Acting County Attorney ===
In August 2019, Montgomery promoted Mitchell to Chief Deputy at the county attorney's office. Mitchell got the job after Montgomery's longtime chief deputy Mark Faull left on medical leave and his replacement Michael McVey took a different role. After Montgomery resigned to take a seat on the state supreme court, Mitchell became acting county attorney until the Maricopa County Board of Supervisors selected an interim to fill out the remainder of Montgomery's term. Mitchell, along with Jon Eliason, Allister Adel, Rodney Glassman, John Kaites, Gina Godbehere, Chris DeRose, and Lacy Cooper, applied for the position.

After the board selected Adel for the county attorney role, Ken Vick became chief deputy and Mitchell became the deputy chief for the criminal group.

=== County attorney ===
Adel resigned in March 2022. The following month, the Maricopa County board of supervisors appointed Mitchell as the interim county attorney.

Mitchell was the Republican nominee in the 2022 special election defeating Gina Godbehere for the nomination. 2020 nominee Julie Gunnigle was unopposed for the Democratic nomination. Mitchell defeated Gunnigle in the general election with 52.8% of the vote.

== Recognition ==
Mitchell was named the prosecutor of the year by her office in 2006. Later in her career, she was recognized as the “Outstanding Arizona Sexual Assault Prosecutor of the Year” by Arizona governor Janet Napolitano and state attorney general Terry Goddard.

== U.S. Senate Judicial Committee Hearing to confirm Brett Kavanaugh ==
In September 2018, Mitchell took a leave of absence from the Maricopa County Attorney's Office in order to serve as Nominations Investigative Counsel for the U.S. Senate Judiciary Committee, during the confirmation hearings of Brett Kavanaugh for Associate Justice of the Supreme Court of the United States. In the September 27, 2018 hearing, Mitchell questioned both Christine Blasey Ford and Kavanaugh concerning Ford's allegations of sexual assault against Kavanaugh. Mitchell was specifically selected for her highly regarded skills as a veteran prosecutor, her specialization in sex crimes, and her knowledge of forensic interviewing of victims. The committee's Democratic senators questioned Ford and Kavanaugh themselves. During the coverage of the hearing, CBS News described Mitchell as "a career prosecutor with decades of experience prosecuting sex crimes".

Following the hearing, Mitchell issued a memorandum concluding a reasonable prosecutor would not file charges based on the evidence before the committee. The memo was criticized for drawing conclusions based on too little evidence.

On September 29, 2018, and October 6, 2018, Mitchell was portrayed by actress Aidy Bryant in the Saturday Night Live opening sketch, and referred to in the "Weekend Update" segment.
