= Rachel Luba =

American sports agent

- Born: Rachel Erin Luba; July 27, 1992 (age 34); Monterey, California, U.S.
- Education: University of California, Los Angeles (BA); Pepperdine University (JD)
- Occupations: Sports agent, attorney
- Employer: Luba Sports
- Website: lubasports.com

Rachel Erin Luba (born July 27, 1992) is an American sports agent. She is the founder and owner of Luba Sports, a sports agency based in Maple Valley, Washington. She is also the youngest certified female agent in baseball.

== Early and personal life ==
Luba is a native of Monterey, California. She attended the University of California, Los Angeles (UCLA), where she was a gymnast. Luba graduated magna cum laude a year early in 2013 from UCLA, earning her bachelor's degree in communications. Following her retirement from gymnastics, Luba entered the world of competitive boxing. Luba went on to attend law school at Pepperdine University, graduating a semester early in 2016.

Luba competed on Season 13 of American Ninja Warrior, but failed on the first obstacle.

== Career ==
Luba began her sports agency career as an intern for the Beverly Hills Sports Council while in law school. In 2017, she was hired by the Major League Baseball Players Association as a lawyer, working on over 22 arbitration cases and helping win a record 12 hearings for MLB players in 2018.

Luba founded her own sports agency, Luba Sports, in October 2019. She revealed that in an effort to pay off student debt from law school, she started out working 10- to 14-hour days as the sole employee of the company. Later that year, pitcher Trevor Bauer signed with the company, becoming Luba's first client. Her first negotiations as an agent were between Bauer and the Cincinnati Reds. Luba negotiated the second-highest contract for an arbitration-eligible pitcher in MLB history, with Bauer signing a one-year, $17.5 million contract with the Reds.

Bauer went on to win the 2020 NL Cy Young. The following year in the 2020–2021 offseason, Luba helped negotiate a record-breaking deal for Bauer with the Los Angeles Dodgers, earning $40 million in 2021 and $45 million in 2022 and making him the highest paid player in Major League Baseball history in each of those years. Luba's record-breaking deal for her client is the first contract in Major League Baseball to eclipse $40 million in a single season. The contract was also structured with a player opt-out after years 1 and 2. This means a three-year total of $102 million should he choose to opt-in for both 2022 and 2023.

All-Star right fielder Yasiel Puig was previously represented by Luba's sports agency from November 2020 to November 2021 until he dismissed the firm for a more established sports agency .

Luba co-hosts a podcast, Cork'd Up, with Jessica Kleinschmidt. She also runs her own YouTube channel in which she explains the arbitration process, and other jobs of an agent.
