= Journal of Business, Entrepreneurship and the Law =

The Journal of Business, Entrepreneurship and the Law (JBEL) is a legal periodical published by Pepperdine University School of Law. JBEL, a subset of the Geoffrey H. Palmer Center for Entrepreneurship and the Law, began operations in the 2006–2007 academic year.

The primary objective of JBEL is to contribute to the body of legal knowledge in the fields of business and entrepreneurship through publication of a high quality and professional periodical. JBEL publishes two issues per year, one each fall and spring semester, containing articles from students, academics, practitioners, lawmakers, regulators, and entrepreneurs in the fields of business law and entrepreneurship.

Additionally, JBEL hosts symposia in the fields of business law and entrepreneurship and publishes resulting symposia issues.

JBEL is a student run organization. Student editors make all editorial and organizational decisions, including article selection, editing, publishing, and hosting symposia. Staff members are selected on the basis of scholarship and their ability to excel at legal research and writing. Staff membership is recognized as both an honor and a unique educational experience.
