= AACN Nursing Scan in Critical Care =

- Discipline: Critical care nursing
- Language: English
- Edited by: Gayle Whitman

Publication details
- History: 1991–1998
- Publisher: NURSECOM for American Association of Critical-Care Nurses (Philadelphia, Pennsylvania, United States)
- Frequency: Bimonthly

Standard abbreviations
- ISO 4: AACN Nurs. Scan Crit. Care

Indexing
- ISSN: 1055-8349
- OCLC no.: 60620766 23352533 60620766

AACN Nursing Scan in Critical Care was a critical care nursing journal published by NURSECOM, Inc. for the American Association of Critical Care Nurses. It was published bimonthly between 1991 and 1998.

== See also ==
- AACN Advanced Critical Care
