= Allister Adel =

Maricopa County District Attorney (1976–2022)

29th County Attorney of Maricopa County
- In office November 20, 2020 – March 25, 2022; Interim: October 3, 2019 – November 20, 2020
- Preceded by: Bill Montgomery
- Succeeded by: Rachel Mitchell

Personal details
- Born: November 11, 1976 Dallas, Texas, U.S.
- Died: April 30, 2022 (aged 45) Phoenix, Arizona, U.S.
- Party: Republican
- Spouse: David DeNitto
- Children: 2
- Education: University of Arizona; Arizona State University (JD)

Allister Adel (November 11, 1976 – April 30, 2022) was an American attorney who served as the County Attorney for Maricopa County, Arizona, from 2019 to 2022. She was the first woman to hold the position. Originally appointed to the position, Adel subsequently won election to a full term in November 2020. However, she resigned in March 2022 amid controversies over her tenure and fitness for office, and died a month later.

== Early life and career ==
Adel grew up in Dallas, Texas, where she attended an all-girls school, The Hockaday School. Adel received her bachelor's degree in political science with a minor in criminology from the University of Arizona in 1999. She then worked at the Maricopa County Superior Court from 1999 to 2001 as a criminal court administrator. Deciding to go to law school to become a prosecutor, Adel graduated from the Sandra Day O'Connor College of Law in 2004.

After graduating law school, Adel served as a prosecutor with the Maricopa County Attorney's Office (2004 – 2011) in the vehicular crimes, gang and drug enforcement bureaus. She then became an administrative law judge with the Arizona Department of Transportation. Adel briefly served as general counsel for the Department of Child Safety. There, Adel sent Governor Doug Ducey a memo under the state's whistle-blower statute regarding Ducey's appointment of Greg McKay as DCS Director. The details of the memo were never revealed.

From 2016 to 2018, Adel was the executive director for the Maricopa County Bar Association.

== County Attorney ==
In 2019, Bill Montgomery resigned as county attorney to take a seat on the Arizona Supreme Court. Adel was selected by the Maricopa County Board of Supervisors to replace Montgomery. Other applicants who applied for the position included: Rachel Mitchell, Jon Eliason, Rodney Glassman, John Kaites, Gina Godbehere, Chris DeRose, and Lacy Cooper.

In 2020, Adel was unopposed in the Republican primary and defeated Democrat Julie Gunnigle in the general election, receiving 46.45% of the vote.

=== Health issues ===
On the night of the 2020 election, Adel was hospitalized and had emergency surgery for bleeding to the brain. Nine days prior, she had fallen and hit her head resulting in a blood clot in her brain. She remained hospitalized for two months at Barrow Neurological Institute in Phoenix, and underwent a second surgery in January 2021, but by February had returned to work.

In August 2021, Adel checked herself into a rehab facility in California to work on problems that included stress, anxiety, an eating disorder and alcoholism. Adel continued to run the county attorney's office and returned to work in September. Adel confirmed two alcohol relapses since leaving the rehab center.

=== Policies ===
Adel campaigned on a promise to move the county away from the hard-line policies implemented under Bill Montgomery. During the 2020 election, Adel made several pledges, including to reduce Arizona's mass incarceration rate, increase alternatives to prison, reduce the county's practice of overcharging defendants, and giving prosecutors more leeway in plea negotiations.

After her appointment, Adel reversed a county policy that had prevented gay couples from getting legal services for adoption required by state law.

Adel fired controversial prosecutor Juan Martinez who was accused by multiple women of sexual harassment and faced investigations by the state bar for alleged prosecutorial misconduct in several death penalty cases.

In September 2020, the county attorney's office declined to file charges against the police officer involved in the Shooting of Dion Johnson.

=== Prosecution of protestors ===
In October 2020, several Black Lives Matter protestors arrested in Phoenix were charged by the county attorney's office as gang members. Questions over the way Adel's office handled the prosecution of 15 protesters resulted in a critical reporting in August 2021 accusing the office of colluding with Phoenix police officers to falsely charge protesters. The cases were dropped a week after ABC 15 published an investigation on the dubious nature of the charges. Adel claimed that her brain injury "impacted her ability to vet the case and understand the evidence behind the charges." The incident led to the Department of Justice opening an investigation of the Phoenix Police Department.

=== Calls for resignation ===
Multiple groups pushed for Adel to resign. In September 2021, the Maricopa County Democratic Party sought Adel's resignation in response to the controversial prosecution of the Black Lives Matter protestors and Adel's rehab treatment. A week later, Mass Liberation AZ, a criminal justice reform and activist group, launched a “Resign or Be Recalled" campaign.

On February 15, 2022, five top prosecutors in the county attorney's office wrote a letter demanding that Adel step down, sending it to the board of supervisors and the state bar. The letter "raised ethical questions about her sobriety, long absences from work and judgment." On February 22, 2022, Adel rejected their call for resignation, stating they "either stick it out or resign."

Former long-serving county attorney Rick Romley also publicly stated Adel should step down.

Adel announced her intention to resign on March 21, 2022, effective March 25.

== Personal life and death ==
Adel was married to David DeNitto and they had two children. She was a registered Republican since 2000. She died on April 30, 2022, at the age of 45 due to health complications.
