= Colleen Graffy =

American diplomat

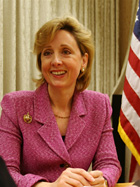
Colleen Graffy. U.S. State Dep’t photo

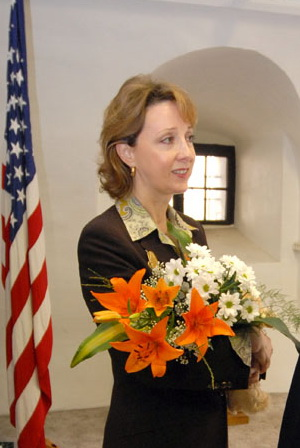
Colleen Graffy in Budapest, March 2008

Colleen Graffy is a former United States deputy assistant secretary of state for Public Diplomacy for Europe and Eurasia, and associate professor of law and Director of Global Programs at Pepperdine University School of Law and Academic Director of their London campus. She is former chairman of SEAL, the Society of English and American Lawyers.

Graffy is originally from Santa Barbara, California. She earned her B.A. from Pepperdine University and her M.A. from Boston University. She attended Pepperdine’s study abroad program in Heidelberg while an undergraduate and later became co-director of Pepperdine’s campus in Heidelberg, Germany.

She moved to the United Kingdom after completing her master's degree to start Pepperdine’s new London undergraduate program where she was the director and taught international relations and British government. She earned a law degree at City University and the Inns of Court School of Law and an LLM at King's College London. She was called to the Bar of England & Wales and is a Barrister and Bencher at The Honourable Society of the Middle Temple. She was chairman of Republicans Abroad for the United Kingdom.

She joined the U.S. State Department in 2005 as Deputy Assistant Secretary of State for Public Diplomacy, the first person to hold that position. She reported to both the Assistant Secretary, Daniel Fried in the Bureau for European and Eurasian Affairs and the Undersecretary for Public Diplomacy and Public Affairs, Karen Hughes, (later James Glassman).

She spoke and wrote on Guantanamo issues. On suicides in Guantanamo: "It does sound like this is part of a strategy - in that they don't value their own lives, and they certainly don't value ours; and they use suicide bombings as a tactic," Colleen Graffy, the deputy assistant secretary of state for public diplomacy, told BBC's Newshour yesterday. "Taking their own lives was not necessary, but it certainly is a good PR move." Graffy has also been quoted as saying to Kate Allen of Amnesty International UK via e-mail in 2004 that, "In the Second World War, Americans and Britons who were captured were held until the end of hostilities. They were not read rights or given a dime to call their lawyer."

She was the first high level US government official to actively advance "Public Diplomacy 2.0" and use Twitter. In response to criticism for tweeting as a diplomat she wrote an Op-Ed on the importance of social media as a tool of public diplomacy in the Washington Post. She introduced green diplomacy and the importance of visual communications in public diplomacy and launched the Ben Franklin Transatlantic Fellowship as well as the first "media hub" for the U.S. government with radio and television broadcasting facilities based in Brussels, Belgium.

She is a frequent commentator in the broadcast media and the press. She debated for Intelligence Squared on the 10th Anniversary of 9/11 and wrote an article from that arguing that Iraq was a catalyst for the Arab Spring. In an op-ed for the Los Angeles Times, she drew attention to evidence of war crimes in Syria. She appeared on BBC’s Question Time with former foreign secretary David Miliband and Jerry Springer in the run-up to the US presidential elections.

In 2020, Graffy, along with over 130 other former Republican national security officials, signed a statement that asserted that President Trump was unfit to serve another term, and "To that end, we are firmly convinced that it is in the best interest of our nation that Vice President Joe Biden be elected as the next President of the United States, and we will vote for him."
