= Nancy D. Erbe =

American negotiationist and academic

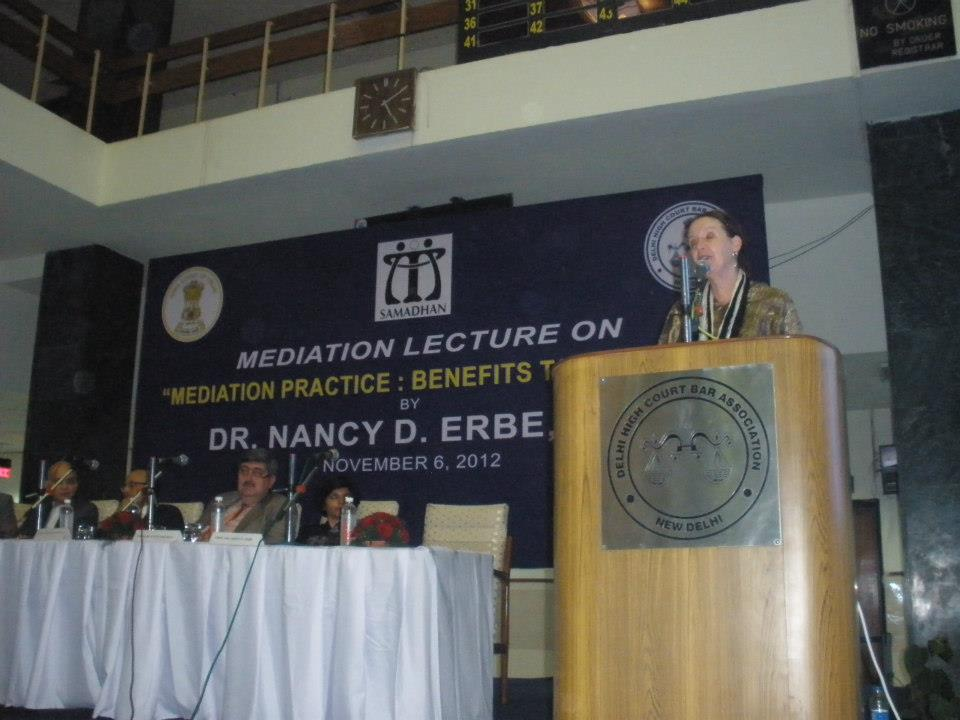
- Born: Portsmouth, Virginia, United States
- Education: Metropolitan State University (BA); University of Minnesota (JD); Pepperdine University (LLM)
- Occupations: Professor; author

Nancy Diane Erbe is an American negotiation, conflict resolution, and peacebuilding professor at California State University, Dominguez Hills (CSUDH).

== Education and career ==
Erbe graduated from University of Minnesota with a Juris Doctor, and Straus Institute for Dispute Resolution, Pepperdine University School of Law with an L.L.M.

She was the founding director of the Rotary Center for International Studies in Peace and Conflict Resolution at the University of California, Berkeley. Since 2017 Erbe has been editor-in-chief of Advances in religious and cultural studies (ARCS).
