= Killing of Ryan Whitaker =

Fatal police shooting

Murder of Ryan Whitaker
- Date: May 21, 2020; 10:52 p.m. (UTC−07:00)
- Location: Desert Foothills Drive, Ahwatukee, Phoenix, Arizona, U.S.
- Type: Homicide by firearm
- Filmed by: Police bodycams
- Participants: PPD Officer Jeff Cooke
- Deaths: Ryan Whitaker
- Litigation: $3,000,000 settlement

Ryan Whitaker was a 40-year-old American man who lived in Ahwatukee, Arizona (an urban village of Phoenix, Arizona), who was shot twice and killed by Phoenix Police Department Officer Jeff Cooke at approximately 10:52 p.m. on May 21, 2020. Cooke was accompanied by officer John Ferragamo, who did not fire his weapon. The shooting was captured on bodycam video.

== Incident ==
On May 21, 2020, Phoenix Police Department Officers John Ferragamo and Jeff Cooke responded to a 911 call reporting possible domestic violence at Ryan Whitaker's apartment complex. The officers arrived at the scene around 10:52 p.m. and proceeded directly to Whitaker's apartment door, positioning themselves on opposite sides of the doorway. After Ferragamo knocked on the door and announced their presence, Whitaker opened the door and stepped forward holding a 9 mm handgun in his right hand, pointed downward. Ferragamo immediately activated his flashlight, illuminating Whitaker's face and the weapon, and commanded him to drop his weapon. Whitaker pivoted his body and began to move his gun towards the ground to drop it while putting his left hand up. As Whitaker got to his knees, Cooke fired his weapon three times, hitting Whitaker twice in the back after he had already dropped his gun and at the same time he was raising his hands to put them up in surrender. When Whitaker fell down after being shot twice in the back, the hand that had been holding the weapon came back into the view of the cameras completely empty. The entire encounter lasted 5 seconds. Whitaker's girlfriend emerged from the apartment, asked why he was shot, and was told, "He pulled a gun on us, ma'am."

When recovered, the gun was found inside the apartment, behind where Whitaker had been kneeling when shot. After repeated demands for release of the bodycam footage, edited footage from both officers' cameras was released 55 days after the incident.

Whitaker's girlfriend Brandee Nees, who was present in his apartment at the time of the shooting, said that Whitaker had picked up his handgun before answering the door because there had been a similar inexplicable late-night knocking on his door earlier that week. Nees also told Ferragamo that a woman had previously knocked on his door seeking help in a domestic dispute. An officer had verbally announced, "Phoenix police" when knocking, but Whitaker reportedly did not hear their words because of music playing in his apartment. Ferragamo told another officer who later arrived at the scene that he would have done the same as Cooke if Cooke had not used his weapon first.

The upstairs neighbor had called the 911 emergency telephone line twice that evening to complain about the noises from the apartment before the 10:52 p.m. incident. Nees said there was no argument happening in the apartment; they had just been playing Crash Bandicoot on a PlayStation and enthusiastically shouting comments. Reports said that the upstairs neighbor had exaggerated the description of the noise, giving the impression that there was a violent fight in progress. The video recording includes a comment from Ferragamo indicating that he believed the neighbor was just saying there was violence in order to get the police to respond to the noise complaint – sarcastically quoting the caller as saying "'I'm just gonna say yes to all the questions to get the officers here faster.'" In the first call, the caller had said, "I can tell that they're just at each other's throats down there." In the second call a half hour later, the neighbor said, "It could be physical. I could say yeah, does that make anybody hurry up or get over here any faster?" The caller expressed irritation at being asked whether they knew if either person in the apartment had a weapon, saying "No, but if this gets pushed along any further I could say yes to all these questions." After being told that the operator was required to ask such questions, the caller said "I don't have time, I'd like to get to sleep, I have to get up in the morning." After the second call, the operator had upgraded the status of the report to request an emergency response. In the bodycam video, there are no obvious sounds coming from the apartment.

== Aftermath ==
The family called for murder charges to be filed against Cooke, for both officers and the 911 dispatch officer to be fired for their conduct, and for the people who called 911 to be charged for their actions. Hundreds of demonstrators gathered in protest at the District Attorney's office on October 5, 2020. Whitaker's brother said, "The Phoenix PD murdered my brother. They murdered my brother." He said that he had received no contact by the District Attorney of Maricopa County. As of that time, Cooke and Ferragamo had returned to their jobs. Ferragamo had been returned to ordinary duty, and Cooke had been assigned to non-enforcement work, and had not been charged with any crime in connection to the incident. On July 22, 2021, the Phoenix Police Department announced plans to terminate the employment of Cooke, though he was later reinstated after his termination was downgraded to a 240-hour suspension.

In November 2020, a $3 million settlement was negotiated with Whitaker's family, pending approval by the Phoenix City Council on November 25, 2020. The settlement was approved by Phoenix City Council on December 2, 2020. In January 2021, Maricopa County Attorney Allister Adel announced that she would not be pursuing criminal charges against Cooke.

In April 2023, Brandee Nees agreed to a settlement of her own in federal court.
