= Tennessee Nurses Association =

U.S. professional organization

- Founded: 1905
- Headquarters: Nashville, Tennessee, United States
- Location: United States
- Key people: Jennifer Hitt, PhD, RN, CNE, President
- Website: tnurses.care

The Tennessee Nurses Association (TNA) is a professional organization representing nurses in the U.S. state of Tennessee. TNA is a constituent organization and affiliated with the American Nurses Association (ANA). TNA was formed in 1905 in a drive to regulate nursing practice. In 1907, the first introduced bill was defeated; and, in 1909 the second bill was again defeated. Finally, on February 14, 1911, TNA members lobbying throughout Tennessee resulted in the first nurse practice act being written into law.

== Primary mission ==
Under the state practice act, TNA regulates nursing to protect the public from potentially unsafe nursing practice. This law creates definitions of professional nursing practice and regulates qualifications for education to practice nursing in Tennessee. It outlines criteria for nursing schools, which must be met for approval by the Board of Nursing. TNA works to update the nurse practice act and reflect current, evidence-based practice standards for registered nurses. TNA also serves as an advocate for improving health standards. And, they track the quality and availability of health care throughout the state of Tennessee.

== Tennessee Nurses Foundation ==
The Tennessee Nurses Foundation was established in 1982 to provide a mechanism for supporting programs that meet the needs of TNA members, as well as other nurses and nursing students in the state.

== TNA Political Action Committee (Tennessee Nurses PAC) ==
The TNA is a nonpartisan political action committee. The PAC's activities include:

- Educating and assisting nurses at all levels in political action
- Identifying and supporting nurse candidates for elected state office
- Raising funds
- Interviewing and endorsing candidates for state office who support nursing issues that include practice and legislation.
