= Chioma Udeaja =

Nigerian basketball player

No. 14 – First Bank
- Position: Power forward / center
- League: NPL

Personal information
- Born: June 29, 1984 (age 42) Lagos, Nigeria
- Listed height: 6 ft 3 in (1.91 m)
Medals
Women's basketball
Representing Nigeria
AfroBasket
Gold medal – first place	2017 Mali

Chioma Udeaja (born June 29, 1984) is a Nigerian basketball player for First Bank also known as the Elephant Girl and the Nigerian national team.

== International career ==
She participated at the 2017 Women's Afrobasket.
