= AACN Advanced Critical Care =

- Discipline: Nursing
- Language: English
- Edited by: Mary Fran Tracy

Publication details
- Former names: AACN Clinical Issues: Advanced Practice in Acute and Critical Care; AACN Clinical Issues in Critical Care Nursing; AACN Clinical Issues
- History: 1990–present
- Publisher: AACN (United States)
- Frequency: Quarterly

Standard abbreviations
- ISO 4: AACN Adv. Crit. Care

Indexing
- AACN Advanced Critical Care
- ISSN: 1559-7768 (print); 1559-7776 (web)
- OCLC no.: 63172186
- AACN Clinical Issues: Advanced Practice in Acute and Critical Care
- ISSN: 1079-0713 (print); 1538-9812 (web)
- OCLC no.: 31275033
- AACN Clinical Issues in Critical Care Nursing
- ISSN: 1046-7467
- OCLC no.: 20502221
- AACN Clinical Issues
- ISSN: 1079-0713 (print); 1538-9812 (web)
- OCLC no.: 31275033

Links
- Journal homepage

AACN Advanced Critical Care is a peer-reviewed nursing journal and an official publication of the American Association of Critical Care Nurses. It is intended for "experienced critical care and acute care clinicians at the bedside, advanced practice nurses, and clinical and academic educators."

It is the merger of AACN Clinical Issues: Advanced Practice in Acute and Critical Care (1990–2006), and AACN Clinical Issues (1994–2006) formerly known as AACN Clinical Issues in Critical Care Nursing (1990–1994). The current editor-in-chief is Mary Fran Tracy.

== Indexing and abstracting ==
The journal is indexed and abstracted in: Academic Search, CINAHL, PubMed, and Scopus.

== See also ==
- AACN Nursing Scan in Critical Care
- List of nursing journals
