= Danielle McCray =

American basketball player (born 1987)

Personal information
- Born: October 8, 1987 (age 39) Boynton Beach, Florida, U.S.
- Listed height: 5 ft 11 in (1.80 m)
- Listed weight: 170 lb (77 kg)

Career information
- High school: Olathe East (Olathe, Kansas)
- College: Kansas (2006–2010)
- WNBA draft: 2010: 1st round, 7th overall pick
- Drafted by: Connecticut Sun
- Playing career: 2010–present
- Position: Guard / forward

Career history
- 2010–2011: Hapoel Rishon Le-Zion
- 2011–2014: Connecticut Sun
- 2011–2012: Good Angels Košice
- 2012–2013: Famila Wuber Schio
- 2013–2014: Wisła Can-Pack Kraków
- 2014–2015: Elitzur Ramla
- 2016: Cote d'Opale Basket Calais
- 2016–2017: Desportivo 1. De Agosto Luanda
- 2017: Hapoel Rishon Le-Zion
- 2017: Deportivo de Quito
- 2018: Roche Vendee BC
- 2018–2019: BK Tsmoki-Minsk
- 2019–2020: Enisey Krasnoyars
- 2020–2021: O.ME.P.S. Givova Battipaglia
- 2021–2022: AZS Poznań

Career highlights
- Belarusian League champion (2019); Polish BLK champion (2014); Polish Cup winner (2014); Italian Cup winner (2013); Slovak Extraliga champion (2012); Slovak Cup winner (2012); First-team All-Big 12 (2009); Second-team All-Big 12 (2010)
- Stats at WNBA.com
- Stats at Basketball Reference
Medals
Women's basketball
Representing United States
World University Games
Gold medal – first place	2009 Belgrade	Team

Danielle McCray (born October 8, 1987) is an American professional basketball player. She was selected seventh overall in the 2010 WNBA draft by the Connecticut Sun. She played collegiately for the Kansas Jayhawks where she was named a second-team All-American during her senior season. McCray is the highest-picked player in KU's history.

== Early life ==
McCray was born in Boynton Beach, Florida, and as a young child, her family moved to Olathe, Kansas. McCray attended Olathe East High School and was an All-State selection. During her senior season, she accepted an athletic scholarship to the University of Kansas.

== College career ==
McCray concluded her career ranked in the top 10 of nine categories — including fourth in all-time scoring with 1,934 points — and with a good deal of hardware.

== USA Basketball ==
McCray was named a member of the team representing the US at the 2009 World University Games held in Belgrade, Serbia. The team won all seven games to earn the gold medal. McCray led the team in scoring in the semi-final game against Australia, and was the second leading scorer overall, averaging 12.0 points per game

== Professional career ==
McCray was selected 7th overall by the Connecticut Sun in the 2010 WNBA draft. According to several analysts, McCray would have been selected in the top four had she not suffered an ACL injury she suffered in February 2010. McCray's pick makes her the highest-selected player in the WNBA draft in KU's history.

== Career statistics ==
Legend
GP	Games played	GS	Games started	MPG	Minutes per game	RPG	Rebounds per game
APG	Assists per game	SPG	Steals per game	BPG	Blocks per game	PPG	Points per game
TO	Turnovers per game	FG%	Field-goal percentage	3P%	3-point field-goal percentage	FT%	Free-throw percentage
**Bold**	Career best	°	League leader

=== WNBA ===
==== Regular season ====
WNBA regular season statistics
Year	Team	GP	GS	MPG	FG%	3P%	FT%	RPG	APG	SPG	BPG	TO	PPG
2010	Did not play (injury)												
2011	Connecticut	**34**	**23**	**15.1**	**39.9**	**39.1**	77.1	**2.3**	1.2	0.5	0.1	1.0	**5.9**
2012	Connecticut	28	8	13.9	31.5	33.3	**90.2**	2.0	1.2	0.6	0.0	1.0	4.8
2013	Did not play (injury)												
2014	Connecticut	18	2	11.6	23.2	33.3	50.0	1.4	0.8	0.6	0.1	1.4	1.9
**Career**	3 years, 1 team	80	33	13.9	34.3	36.6	78.9	2.0	1.1	0.6	0.1	1.1	4.6

==== Playoffs ====
WNBA playoff statistics
Year	Team	GP	GS	MPG	FG%	3P%	FT%	RPG	APG	SPG	BPG	TO	PPG
2011	Connecticut	2	**2**	**15.0**	**25.0**	—	**100.0**	**5.5**	**0.5**	0.0	0.0	1.0	**2.5**
2012	Connecticut	**4**	0	4.8	0.0	0.0	—	1.0	0.0	0.0	**0.3**	1.0	0.0
**Career**	2 years, 1 team	6	2	8.2	12.5	0.0	100.0	2.5	0.2	0.0	0.2	1.0	0.8

=== College ===
NCAA statistics
Year	Team	GP	Points	FG%	3P%	FT%	RPG	APG	SPG	BPG	PPG
2006-07	Kansas	30	314	39.9	34.3	**84.6**	4.8	0.5	0.9	0.3	10.5
2007-08	Kansas	30	448	39.8	29.9	76.3	7.1	2.0	1.9	0.5	14.9
2008-09	Kansas	**36**	**777**	45.3	**42.6**	83.1	**7.7**	2.0	1.3	**0.9**	**21.6**
2009-10	Kansas	20	395	**45.5**	41.7	69.5	7.2	**3.1**	**1.6**	0.5	19.8
**Career**		116	1934	42.9	37.7	78.8	6.7	1.8	1.4	0.6	16.7
