= Chris DeRose (author) =

American author (born 1980)

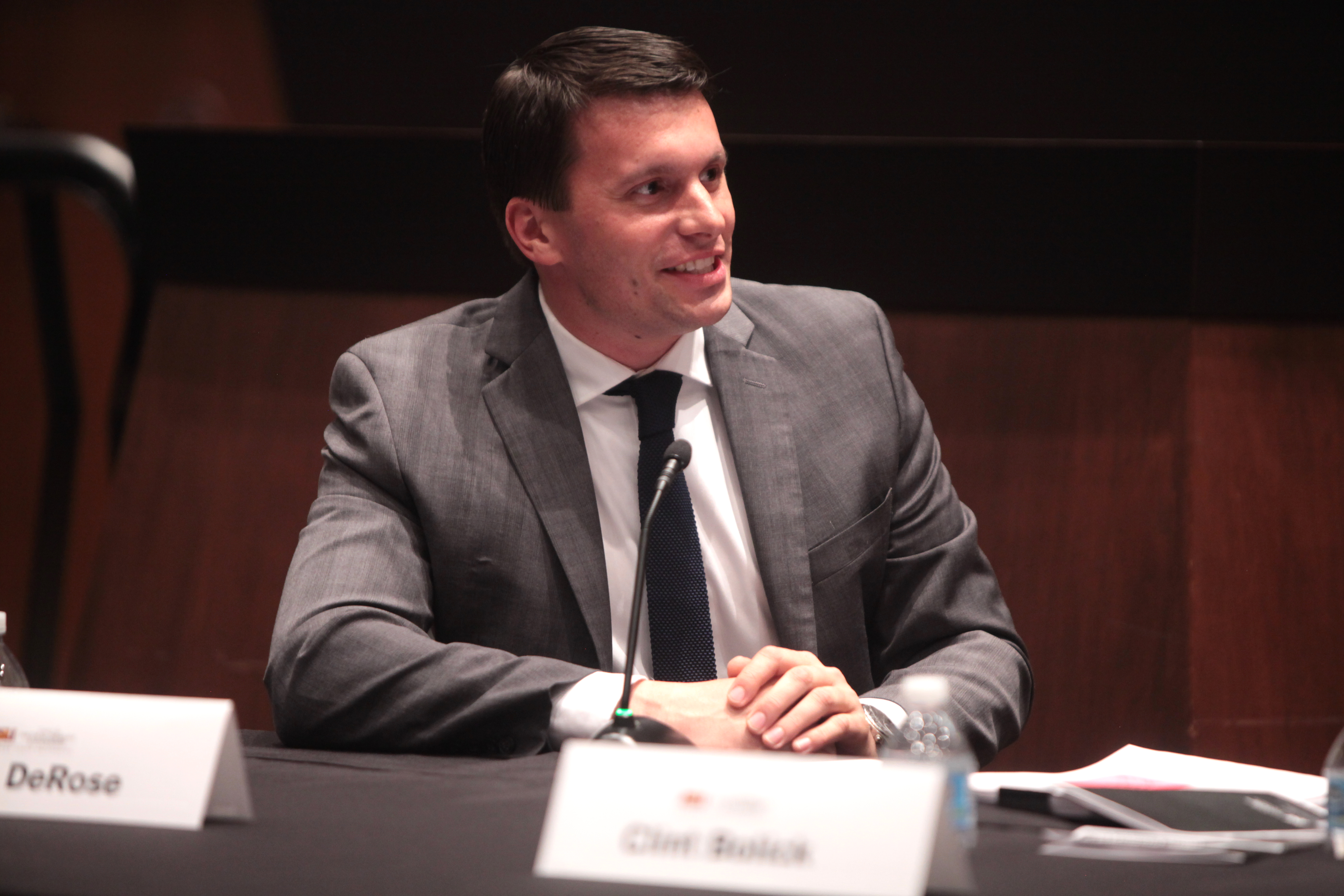
- DeRose speaking on a panel at Arizona State University

Maricopa County Clerk of the Superior Court
- In office March 22, 2018 – January 7, 2019
- Preceded by: Michael K. Jeanes
- Succeeded by: Jeff Fine

Personal details
- Born: Christopher M. DeRose; February 3, 1980 (age 46) Cicero, Illinois, U.S.
- Party: Republican
- Education: Northern Illinois University Pepperdine University School of Law
- Occupation: Author, attorney

Christopher M. DeRose is a New York Times bestselling American author, housing and hospitality developer, and former Clerk of the Superior Court of Maricopa County, Arizona. He was formerly a senior litigation counsel for the Arizona Attorney General.

== Early life and education ==
DeRose was born February 3, 1980, in Cicero, Illinois, where he lived until moving to the nearby town of North Riverside.

He attended Northern Illinois University from 1998 to 2001 and received a BA from Grand Canyon University. He graduated from Pepperdine University School of Law in 2005.

== Politics ==
DeRose volunteered on his first political campaign at the age of fifteen and during college interned on Capitol Hill for the Speaker of the U.S. House of Representatives. Since then he has served in a variety of roles for candidates in five different states, including serving as director of election day operations for Governor of Virginia, Bob McDonnell in 2009, and campaign manager for Congressman Sean Duffy in 2010.

In 2016, DeRose announced his candidacy for the Phoenix City Council. He advanced to the runoff at the November 8, 2016, election with 21% of the vote in a four-way race. DeRose was defeated with 46% of the vote in the March 14, 2017, runoff.

On March 22, 2018, DeRose was appointed Clerk of the Superior Court for Maricopa County by Governor Doug Ducey to fill an unexpired term.

== Books ==
DeRose's first book, Founding Rivals: Madison vs. Monroe, the Bill of Rights, and the Election that Saved a Nation, was named by The Washington Post as one of the "Best Political Books of 2011"

The New York Times featured "Founding Rivals" in an article on the Congressional Book Club as a book popular with members of Congress.

Kirkus Reviews called Founding Rivals "A fresh, narrow, knowledgeable-of-minutia take on a well-known friendship and rivalry during the early establishment of the U.S. Constitution," with a "Compelling narrative throughout…A lively, clear-cut study of the myriad hurdles and uncertainty that characterized the first attempts to form the U.S. government.” Publishers Weekly described it as "An engaging account of the Republic’s contentious founding.”

His second book, Congressman Lincoln: The Making of America's Greatest President, released in 2013, was cited in detail by House Speaker John Boehner in a memorandum to his colleagues on government debt.

Publishers Weekly praised "The Presidents' War" as "a well-written, thorough, and engaging look into a unique political situation in American history." Kirkus called "The Presidents' War" "an informative compendium of the political struggles leading to the Civil War," and praised it for the "revelation of eye-opening facts that are otherwise overlooked." The Christian Science Monitor called it "fascinating."

"Star Spangled Scandal," his fourth book, was published in 2019.

"The Fighting Bunch," DeRose's account of the Battle of Athens (1946), was released by St. Martin's Press in 2020.

== Personal life ==
Prior to his work in national politics, writing, and academia, DeRose was a full-time practicing attorney in Phoenix. Notable representations included the high-profile defense of a Police Chief threatened with termination, allegedly for arresting a County Supervisor and for firing an unqualified employee who was personal friends with the mayor.

DeRose was formerly an Assistant Professor of Law at Arizona Summit Law School from 2012 to 2014. In 2014, the Phoenix Business Journal named DeRose among the "Top 40 Under 40" business leaders.

He lives in Phoenix, Arizona.
