= Killing of Dion Johnson =

2020 police killing in Arizona

- Date: May 25, 2020; 6 years ago
- Location: Phoenix, Arizona, U.S.; 33°40′22.8″N 111°58′38.7″W
- Participants: George Cervantes
- Deaths: Dion Johnson

On May 25, 2020, Dion Johnson, a 28-year-old Black man, was killed in Phoenix, Arizona, United States. According to the Phoenix Police, Department of Public Safety trooper George Cervantes was patrolling when he discovered Johnson's vehicle parked in the gore point near Loop 101 and Tatum Boulevard. Cervantes approached the vehicle and found Johnson asleep at the driver's seat, with cans of beer and a gun in the car, after removing the gun, Cervantes attempted to arrest Johnson.

According to Cervantes, an altercation occurred when Johnson woke up and grabbed at him, Cervantes drew his weapon and ordered Johnson to comply with instructions, Johnson complied and then as Cervantes holstered his weapon, Johnson lunged for the weapon. Another altercation ensued in the struggle, resulting in Cervantes allegedly firing his weapon twice, with one bullet fatally striking Johnson. Johnson later died at the hospital. Police stated there was neither body camera nor car camera footage, and Cervantes was not wearing a body camera. In declining to file charges, Maricopa County Attorney Allister Adel said that multiple witnesses corroborated Cervantes's account; a lawyer for Johnson's family questioned the eyewitness accounts, saying that the witnesses "were driving on the highway at high rates of speed."

== People involved ==
Dion Johnson was a prohibited possessor of firearms due to past criminal charges and had recently been released from the Arizona Department of Corrections several months prior. He had spent time in prison for armed robbery and aggravated assault, was listed as a known gang member, and also had complaints about fights with family and an ex-girlfriend.

George Cervantes is a Public Safety Trooper who was identified as the trooper involved in the shooting, and a fifteen-year veteran of the force. He had been disciplined for some complaints in the past, such as using his police taser on his family's dog.

== Incident ==
According to the Phoenix Police account, a trooper was patrolling when he discovered Johnson's vehicle parked at the triangle piece of land between the freeway and on/off ramp, near Loop 101 and Tatum Boulevard. The trooper approached the vehicle and found Johnson asleep at the driver's seat, with cans of beer and a gun in the car, after removing the gun the trooper returned to his motor unit to wait for a backup officer. Trooper Cervantes then noticed Johnson begin to move around in the vehicle. Fearing Johnson would attempt to drive off and endanger the public, he attempted to arrest him. An altercation occurred when Johnson woke up and grabbed at Trooper Cervantes, who drew his firearm to force Johnson to comply. Johnson initially complied so Trooper Cervantes holstered his weapon. At this time Johnson lunged forward and grabbed a hold of Trooper Cervante's vest. Fearing he would be pushed into oncoming traffic, Trooper Cervantes drew his weapon and fired two shots, striking Johnson once. Trooper Cervantes removed Johnson from the vehicle and placed him into handcuffs, per proper procedure while waiting for backup to arrive to provide traffic control for emergency vehicles staging nearby. Six minutes later, Johnson was loaded onto an ambulance and rushed to the hospital, where he died hours later.

== Investigation ==
Officials have placed the trooper who shot Johnson on paid administrative leave. The trooper was never charged with any foul play. The department also stated there is no dashcam video as both troopers involved were motorcycle officers and were not equipped with body cameras. However, video footage was later released from a live-feed Arizona Department of Transportation camera that was recorded by a local news station after the incident took place. The trooper was never charged or found to be at fault for the murder. The internal investigation by the Arizona Department of Public Safety was completed in April 2021, and concluded that there were no issues or deficiencies in the incident.

== Aftermath ==
The Arizona Department of Public Safety erected fencing around its headquarters in Phoenix in late May 2020 in order to stop a vigil for Johnson on the grounds. The fencing has since been turned into a community mural of posters, cardboard and paper signs that were fixed to the fencing with string and tape.

Johnson's death was protested by Black Lives Matter protestors along with the murder of George Floyd. On June 7, protestors had held 11 days of daily marches in Phoenix to demand change and chanted for six minutes straight to highlight the time that medical aid was withheld from Johnson even with an ambulance stationed a few hundred feet away.

== Response ==
The family of Johnson and their attorney Jocquese Blackwell, have questioned how a man who was sleeping in his vehicle and disarmed could end up being killed, emphasizing the lack of body cameras, police cameras, or other witnesses to corroborate the sole police account of the incident.

Arizona State Representative Reginald Bolding, has demanded more transparency in the case and sent a letter to the public safety department. He later issued a statement to the US Department of Justice to take over the investigation, that was cosigned by Representative Doctor Geraldine Peten and Arizona Commissioner Sandra Kennedy.

In September 2020, Maricopa County attorney Allister Adel decided to not file criminal charges against Cervantes. In response, Johnson's mother filed a wrongful death lawsuit against the state of Arizona and Cervantes. A judge tossed out the case, and in March 2025, Johnson's mother was ordered by a Maricopa County Superior Court judge to pay the state of Arizona $350,000 in legal fees accrued from the case.
