= Connecticut Sun all-time roster =

The following is a list of players, both past and current, who were under contract with the Connecticut Sun (and Orlando Miracle) in the WNBA during the regular season (not including pre-season).

Player	Nat.	No.		Position	Seasons		Yrs	Current Team	From
Player	Nat.	No.		Position	From	To	Yrs	Current Team	From
Svetlana Abrosimova	(Russia)	25		Small forward	2008	2008	1		Connecticut
Danielle Adams	(United States)	11		Forward	2017	present	1	Connecticut Sun	Texas A&M
Tawona Alhaleem	(United States)	44		Guard/forward	2001	2001	1		DePaul
Ambrosia Anderson	(United States)	33		Small forward	2006	2006	1		Brigham Young
Jolene Anderson	(United States)	33		Shooting guard	2008	2008	1	retired	Wisconsin
Rachel Banham	(United States)	1		Point guard	2016	present	2	Connecticut Sun	Minnesota
Mistie Bass	(United States)	8		Forward	2012	2013	2	Free Agent	Duke
Alex Bentley	(United States)	20		Guard	2014	present	4	Connecticut Sun	Penn State
Chante Black	(United States)	33		Center	2009	2009	1		Duke
Debbie Black	(United States)	24		Point guard	2003	2004	2	retired	St. Joseph's
Kelsey Bone	(United States)	3		Center	2014	2016	3	Phoenix Mercury	Texas A&M
Jessica Breland	(United States)	51		Forward	2011	2011	1	Chicago Sky	North Carolina
Kiesha Brown	(United States)	4		Guard	2009	2009	1		Georgia
Jessica Brungo	(United States)	22		Small forward	2004	2006	3	retired	Penn State
Kelley Cain	(United States)	52		Center	2014	2014	1	Güre Belediye	Tennessee
Jamie Carey	(United States)	10		Guard	2005	2008	4	retired	Texas
Sydney Carter	(United States)	1		Guard	2013	2013	1		Texas A&M
Iziane Castro Marques	(Brazil)	88		Guard	2013	2013	1	retired	Brazil
Cori Chambers	(United States)	23		Guard	2007	2007	1		Georgia
Tina Charles	(United States)	31		Center	2010	2013	3	New York Liberty	Connecticut
Kristi Cirone	(United States)	25		Guard	2009	2009	1		Illinois State
Courtney Coleman	(United States)	15		Center	2003	2003	1		Ohio State
Andrea Congreaves	(United Kingdom)	3		Forward	1999	1999	1		Mercer
Davalyn Cunningham	(United States)	50		Small forward	2002	2002	1		Rutgers
Jennifer Derevjanik	(United States)	34		Guard	2004	2005	2		George Mason
Erika de Souza	(Brazil)	41		Center	2007	2007	1		Brazil
Cintia dos Santos	(Brazil)	28		Forward/center	2000	2002	3		Brazil
Katie Douglas	(United States)	32	23	Guard/forward	2001; 2014	2007; 2014	8	retired	Purdue
Margo Dydek	(Poland)	12		Center	2005	2007	3	deceased	Poland
Lauren Ervin	(United States)	44		Forward	2009	2009	1		Arkansas
Feyonda Fitzgerald	(United States)	2		Guard	2017	2017	1	Free Agent	Temple
Kelly Faris	(United States)	34		Guard	2013	2016	4	Adelaide Lightning	Connecticut
Kisha Ford	(United States)	5		Guard	1999	1999	1		Georgia Tech
Candace Futrell	(United States)	12		Guard	2004	2004	1		Duquesne
Cornelia Gayden	(United States)	24		Guard	2000	2000	1		LSU
Kerri Gardin	(United States)	41		Guard/forward	2008	2010	3		Virginia Tech
Briana Gilbreath	(United States)	15		Guard	2014	2014	1	Free agent	USC
Chelsea Gray	(United States)	12		Guard	2015	2015	1	Los Angeles Sparks	Duke
Kalana Greene	(United States)	32		Forward	2011	2013	3		Connecticut
Nikki Greene	(United States)	54		Forward	2015	2015	1	Free Agent	Penn State
Kelsey Griffin	(United States)	5		Forward	2010	2014	4	Bendigo Spirit	Nebraska
Sandrine Gruda	(France)	7		Center	2008	2010	3	Los Angeles Sparks	France
Kamesha Hairston	(United States)	21		Guard/forward	2007	2008	2		Temple
Romana Hamzova	(Czech Republic)	15		Guard	2000	2000	1		Czech Republic
Aneika Henry-Morello	(Jamaica)	15		Center	2016	2016	1	Atlanta Dream	Florida
Jessie Hicks	(United States)	22	7	Forward/center	2000	2003	4		Maryland
Allison Hightower	(United States)	23		Guard	2010	2016	6	Washington Mystics	LSU
Ebony Hoffman	(United States)	16		Forward	2014	2014	1		USC
Amber Holt	(United States)	1		Guard/forward	2008	2009	2		Middle Tennessee
Jordan Hooper	(United States)	15		Forward	2017	2017	1	Chicago Sky	Nebraska
Anete Jekabsone-Zogota	(Latvia)	10		Guard	2009	2010	2		Latvia
Adrienne Johnson	(United States)	31		Guard	1999	2003	5		Ohio State
Jaclyn Johnson	(United States)	33		Small forward	2001	2001	1		Kansas
Shannon Johnson	(United States)	14		Point guard	1999	2003	5	retired	South Carolina
Asjha Jones	(United States)	15		Power forward	2004	2012	9	Elitzur Ramla	Connecticut
Brionna Jones	(United States)	42		Power forward	2017	present	1	Connecticut Sun	Maryland
Jonquel Jones	(The Bahamas)	35		Power forward/center	2016	present	2	Connecticut Sun	George Washington
Lynetta Kizer	(United States)	12		Forward	2017	present	1	Connecticut Sun	Maryland
Natasha Lacy	(United States)	11		Guard	2013	2013	1		UTEP
Jennifer Lacy	(United States)	21		Forward	2015	2015	1	Free Agent	Pepperdine
Kara Lawson	(United States)	20		Guard	2010	2013	3	retired	Tennessee
Camille Little	(United States)	2		Forward	2015	2016	2	Phoenix Mercury	North Carolina
Rebecca Lobo	(United States)	50		Center	2003	2003	1	retired	Connecticut
Chiney Ogwumike	(United States)	13		Forward	2014	present	2	2017 WNBA Suspension: Injury	Stanford
Inga Orekhova	(Ukraine)	33		Guard	2015	2015	1		South Florida
Clarisse Machanguana	(United States)	00		Center	2002	2002	1		Old Dominion
Danielle McCray	(United States)	4		Guard	2011	2014	4		Kansas
Megan Mahoney	(United States)	24		Guard/forward	2006	2007	2	A.S.D. San Martino di Lupari	Kansas State
Evanthia Maltsi	(Greece)	9		Guard/forward	2007	2007	1	Olympiacos	Greece
Tiffany McCain	(United States)	12		Guard	2000	2002	3		Kentucky
Carla McGhee	(United States)	10		Forward	1999	2002	4	retired	Tennessee
Taj McWilliams-Franklin	(United States)	11		Forward/center	1999	2006	8	retired	St. Edward's
Renee Montgomery	(United States)	21		Guard	2010	2014	4	Minnesota Lynx	Connecticut
Jessica Moore	(United States)	30		Center	2011	2011	1	Free Agent	Connecticut
Yolanda Moore	(United States)	33		Forward/center	1999	1999	1	retired	Mississippi
Danielle Page	(United States)	52		Forward/center	2008	2008	1	UNIQA Sopron	Nebraska
Wendy Palmer	(United States)	3		Forward	2002	2004	3	retired	Virginia
Erin Phillips	(Australia)	31		Guard	2006; 2008	2006; 2009	3	retired	Australia
Kayla Pedersen	(United States)	7		Forward	2013	present	5	Connecticut Sun	Stanford
Tari Phillips	(United States)	24		Forward	1999	1999	1		Central Florida
Elaine Powell	(United States)	5	50	Point guard	1999	2002	4	retired	LSU
Brooke Queenan	(United States)	2		Forward	2006	2006	1	retired	Boston College
Kristen Rasmussen	(United States)	52		Power forward	2007	2007	1		Michigan State
Tamika Williams	(United States)	34		Power forward	2008	2008	1		Connecticut
Nykesha Sales	(United States)	42		Guard/forward	1999	2007	9	retired	Connecticut
Sheri Sam	(United States)	55		Guard/forward	1999	1999	1		Vanderbilt
Chay Shegog	(United States)	34		Center	2012	2012	1		North Carolina
LaCharlotte Smith	(United States)	5		Guard	2000	2000	1		Mississippi State
Shekinna Stricklen	(United States)	40		Forward	2015	present	3	Connecticut Sun	Tennessee
Tora Suber	(United States)	7		Guard	1999	1999	1		Virginia
Laura Summerton	(Australia)	14		Forward/center	2005	2006	2	Adelaide Lightning	Australia
Ketia Swanier	(United States)	11		Guard	2008	2008	1		Connecticut
Asia Taylor	(United States)	31		Forward	2016	2016	1		Louisville
Alyssa Thomas	(United States)	25		Forward	2014	present	4	Connecticut Sun	Maryland
Jasmine Thomas	(United States)	5		Guard	2015	present	3	Connecticut Sun	Duke
Morgan Tuck	(United States)	33		Forward	2016	present	2	Connecticut Sun	Connecticut
Barbara Turner	(United States)	11		Forward	2008	2009	2		Connecticut
Ashley Walker	(United States)	44		Center	2013	2013	1		California
DeMya Walker	(United States)	22		Forward	2010	2011	2		Virginia
Lindsay Whalen	(United States)	13		Point guard	2004	2009	6	Minnesota Lynx	Minnesota
Tan White	(United States)	10		Guard	2009	2013	4		Mississippi State
Tamika Whitmore	(United States)	00		Forward/center	2008	2009	2		Memphis State
Courtney Williams	(United States)	10		Guard	2016	present	2	Connecticut Sun	South Florida
Elizabeth Williams	(United States)	1		Center	2015	2015	1	Atlanta Dream	Duke
Le'coe Willingham	(United States)	43		Forward/center	2004	2007	4		Auburn
Brooke Wyckoff	(United States)	21		Forward	2001	2005	5		Florida State
