= 2009 Connecticut Sun season =

- Head coach: Mike Thibault
- Arena: Mohegan Sun Arena

Results
- Record: 16–18 (.471)
- Place: 6th (Eastern)
- Playoff finish: Did not qualify

Media
- Television: WCTX

The 2009 WNBA season was the 11th season for the Connecticut Sun franchise of the Women's National Basketball Association. It is their seventh in Connecticut. The Sun attempted to advance to the WNBA Playoffs for the seventh consecutive season, but did not qualify for the postseason.

== Offseason ==
=== Dispersal Draft ===
Based on the Sun's 2008 record, they would pick 10th in the Houston Comets dispersal draft. The Sun waived their pick.

=== WNBA draft ===
The following are the Sun's selections in the 2009 WNBA draft.

Round	Pick	Player	Nationality	School/team/country
1	10	Chante Black	United States	Duke
2	17 (from Minn.)	Lyndra Littles	United States	Virginia
3	36	Alba Torrens	Spain	Spain

== Transactions ==
- July 4: The Sun waived Lauren Ervin due to the arrival of Sandrine Gruda.
- June 28: The Sun waived Barbara Turner due to the arrival of Anete Jēkabsone-Žogota.
- June 19: The Sun signed Tan White and waived Kristi Cirone.
- June 5: The Sun waived Lyndra Littles, Danielle Page and Carrem Gay.
- June 3: The Sun claimed Kiesha Brown off waivers.
- June 1: The Sun waived Ketia Swanier and Ashley Hayes.
- April 20: The Sun signed Carrem Gay to a training camp contract.
- April 20: The Sun announced that Tamika Raymond would sit out the 2009 season.
- April 13: The Sun announced Jamie Carey's retirement.
- April 13: The Sun signed Ashley Hayes to a training camp contract.
- April 10: The Sun signed Kristi Cirone to a training camp contract.
- February 13: The Sun signed Anete Jēkabsone-Žogota to a training camp contract.
- January 23: The Sun signed Lauren Ervin to a rookie-scale contract.
- January 21: The Sun signed Barbara Turner, Kerri Gardin, and Danielle Page for the 2009 season.
- January 7: The Sun signed Kerri Gardin and Danielle Page to training camp contracts.

Date	Trade	
March 14, 2008	To Connecticut Sun	To Minnesota Lynx
March 14, 2008	Minnesota's second-round 2009 Draft pick and Tamika Raymond	Connecticut's second-round 2009 Draft pick and Kristen Rasmussen

=== Free agents ===
==== Additions ====
Player	Signed	Former team
Kerri Gardin	January 21, 2009	re-signed
Anete Jēkabsone-Žogota	February 13, 2009	free agent
Kiesha Brown	June 3, 2009	Washington Mystics
Tan White	June 19, 2009	Indiana Fever

==== Subtractions ====
Player	Left	New team
Jamie Carey	April 13, 2009	retired
Tamika Raymond	April 20, 2009	free agent
Ketia Swanier	June 1, 2009	Phoenix Mercury
Lyndra Littles	June 5, 2009	free agent
Danielle Page	June 5, 2009	free agent
Barbara Turner	June 28, 2009	free agent
Lauren Ervin	July 4, 2009	free agent
Svetlana Abrosimova	2009	free agent

== Roster ==
2009 Connecticut Sun roster
Players
Coaches

Pos.	No.	Nat.	Name	Height	Weight	From
C	33	(United States)	Black, Chante	6' 5" (1.96m)	188 lb (85kg)	Duke
PG	4	(United States)	Brown, Kiesha	5' 10" (1.78m)	134 lb (61kg)	Georgia
SF	41	(United States)	Gardin, Kerri	6' 1" (1.85m)	165 lb (75kg)	Virginia Tech
C	7	(France)	Gruda, Sandrine	6' 4" (1.93m)	185 lb (84kg)	France
G/F	1	(United States)	Holt, Amber	6' 0" (1.83m)	167 lb (76kg)	Middle Tennessee
SG	10	(Latvia)	Jēkabsone-Žogota, Anete	5' 9" (1.75m)	180 lb (82kg)	Latvia
PF	15	(United States)	Jones, Asjha	6' 2" (1.88m)	198 lb (90kg)	Connecticut
PG	31	(Australia)	Phillips, Erin	5' 7" (1.7m)	162 lb (73kg)	Australia
PG	13	(United States)	Whalen, Lindsay	5' 9" (1.75m)	150 lb (68kg)	Minnesota
SG	20	(United States)	White, Tan	5' 7" (1.7m)	154 lb (70kg)	Mississippi State
PF	00	(United States)	Whitmore, Tamika	6' 2" (1.88m)	190 lb (86kg)	Memphis

Head coach
(United States) Mike Thibault (Saint Martin's)
Assistant coaches
(United States) Scott Hawk (Omaha)
(United States) Bernadette Mattox (Georgia)
Athletic trainer
(United States) Jeremy Norman (Keene State)
Strength and conditioning coach
(United States) Jodi Hopkins (Ohio)

Legend

- (C) Team captain
- (DP) Unsigned draft pick
- (FA) Free agent
- (S) Suspended
- Injured

WNBA roster page

== Season standings ==
Eastern Conference	W	L	PCT	GB	Home	Road	Conf.
Indiana Fever ^{x}	22	12	.647	–	14–3	8–9	17–5
Atlanta Dream ^{x}	18	16	.529	4.0	12–5	6–11	10–12
Detroit Shock ^{x}	18	16	.529	4.0	11–6	7–10	11–11
Washington Mystics ^{x}	16	18	.471	6.0	11–6	5–12	10–12
Chicago Sky ^{o}	16	18	.471	6.0	12–5	4–13	10–12
Connecticut Sun ^{o}	16	18	.471	6.0	12–5	4–13	9–12
New York Liberty ^{o}	13	21	.382	9.0	8–9	5–12	8–13

== Schedule ==
=== Preseason ===
2009 Game Log: Preseason

Game	Date	Time (ET)	Opponent	Score	High points	High rebounds	High assists	Location/Attendance	Record
1	May 22	7:00pm	New York	74-62	Jones (11)	Black (7)	Whalen (3)	Mohegan Sun Arena; 5,578	1–0
2	May 27	7:30pm	@ Atlanta	73-76	Phillips (18)	Black, Ervin (6)	Swanier, Whalen (3)	Philips Arena; 4,980	1-1
3	May 31	7:00pm	Los Angeles	77-80	Phillips (11)	Littles (8)	Phillips, Swanier, Whalen (3)	Mohegan Sun Arena; 6,630	1–2

=== Regular season ===
2009 Game Log: Regular Season
June

Game	Date	Time (ET)	Opponent	TV	Score	High points	High rebounds	High assists	Location/Attendance	Record
1	June 6	4:00pm	Washington		70-82	Jones (22)	Whalen (6)	Whalen (4)	Mohegan Sun Arena; 7,191	0–1
2	June 7	4:00pm	@ New York	WCTX	66-57	Whalen (14)	Whalen (12)	Brown, Cirone, Whalen, Whitmore (2)	Madison Square Garden; 13,397	1-1
3	June 14	3:00pm	Atlanta		62-67	Whalen (16)	Black (9)	Whalen (5)	Mohegan Sun Arena; 6,429	1–2
4	June 16	8:00pm	@ Chicago		75-78	Jones, Whitmore (16)	Jones (5)	Whalen (8)	UIC Pavilion; 2,396	1–3
5	June 19	7:00pm	Chicago		91-61	Jones (17)	Gardin (11)	Gardin (7)	Mohegan Sun Arena; 5,892	2–3
6	June 21	3:00pm	San Antonio	NBA TV; WCTX	71-58	Jones (19)	Black (8)	Jones, Turner, Whalen (3)	Mohegan Sun Arena; 6,928	3-3
7	June 27	7:00pm	Atlanta		82-68	Jones (24)	Jones (12)	Whalen (5)	Mohegan Sun Arena; 6,264	4–3

July

Game	Date	Time (ET)	Opponent	TV	Score	High points	High rebounds	High assists	Location/Attendance	Record
8	July 2	7:00pm	@ Indiana	NBA TV; FSI	53-67	Whalen (11)	Black (8)	Brown, Whalen, White (3)	Conseco Fieldhouse; 6,468	4-4
9	July 5	6:00pm	@ Detroit		95-92 (OT)	Gruda (23)	Gardin, Gruda (6)	Jones (5)	Palace of Auburn Hills; 6,981	5–4
10	July 7	7:30pm	@ Atlanta		67-72	Jones, White (14)	Gruda, Jones, White (6)	Brown (4)	Philips Arena; 6,225	5-5
11	July 11	7:00pm	Detroit	NBA TV; WCTX	77-79 (OT)	Jones (23)	Jones (10)	Whalen (3)	Mohegan Sun Arena; 6,342	5–6
12	July 14	7:00pm	Los Angeles	ESPN2	82-71	Jones (24)	Gruda (6)	Jones, Whalen (5)	Mohegan Sun Arena; 6,612	6-6
13	July 17	8:00pm	@ San Antonio		72-64	Jones (17)	Gruda, Whalen (7)	Jones, Whalen (5)	AT&T Center; 9,524	7–6
14	July 19	3:00pm	Indiana		67-61	Whalen (15)	Gruda (9)	Whalen (6)	Mohegan Sun Arena; 6,517	8–6
15	July 22	7:00pm	Sacramento		83-75	Jones (28)	Jones (10)	Phillips (7)	Mohegan Sun Arena; 5,675	9–6
16	July 28	7:30pm	Phoenix	ESPN2	80-95	Jekabsone-Zogota (15)	Whalen (8)	Holt, Whalen (4)	Mohegan Sun Arena; 7,739	9–7
17	July 30	8:00pm	@ Indiana	FSI	85-94 (OT)	Jones (21)	Gruda (10)	5 players (3)	Conseco Fieldhouse; 6,538	9–8

August

Game	Date	Time (ET)	Opponent	TV	Score	High points	High rebounds	High assists	Location/Attendance	Record
18	August 1	7:00pm	@ Chicago	NBA TV; WCTX	72-84	White (16)	White (6)	Jekabsone-Zogota (6)	UIC Pavilion; 3,071	9-9
19	August 2	6:00pm	@ Detroit		83-65	Whalen (22)	Gruda (8)	Whalen (4)	Palace of Auburn Hills; 7,814	10–9
20	August 7	8:00pm	@ Minnesota	NBA TV; FSN-N	88-95	Gruda (21)	Gruda, Jones (6)	Jekabsone-Zogota (7)	Target Center; 8,134	10-10
21	August 9	3:00pm	Washington		96-67	Whalen (16)	Holt (8)	Whalen (5)	Mohegan Sun Arena; 6,528	11–10
22	August 13	7:00pm	Seattle		64-53	Gruda (14)	Jones (10)	Whalen (7)	Mohegan Sun Arena; 6,983	12–10
23	August 14	7:00pm	@ Washington		89-91 (2OT)	Jones (23)	Gruda (10)	Whalen (5)	Verizon Center; 9,738	12–11
24	August 19	7:00pm	New York		74-69	Whalen (20)	Whalen (10)	White (6)	Mohegan Sun Arena; 6,050	13–11
25	August 21	7:30pm	@ New York	NBA TV; MSG	83-85 (OT)	Gruda (24)	Gruda (12)	Whalen (7)	Madison Square Garden; 9,355	13–12
26	August 22	7:00pm	Minnesota		98-94	Gruda, Whalen (21)	Gruda (9)	Whalen (8)	Mohegan Sun Arena; 7,803	14–12
27	August 25	7:00pm	Detroit		70-90	Gruda (19)	Gardin (7)	Whalen (8)	Mohegan Sun Arena; 6,811	14–13
28	August 27	10:00pm	@ Seattle		74-86	Whalen (18)	Gardin (8)	Whalen (5)	KeyArena; 6,588	14-14
29	August 29	10:00pm	@ Phoenix	NBA TV; WCTX	84-95	Jekabsone-Zogota (23)	Gardin (13)	Brown, Gardin, Whalen (3)	US Airways Center; 9,977	14–15
30	August 30	9:30pm	@ Los Angeles	NBA TV; FSNW	81-91	Jekabsone-Zogota (21)	Gruda (7)	Whalen (9)	STAPLES Center; 11,072	14–16

September

Game	Date	Time (ET)	Opponent	TV	Score	High points	High rebounds	High assists	Location/Attendance	Record
31	September 1	10:00pm	@ Sacramento		70-90	Gruda, White (13)	Gruda (5)	Brown, Phillips (3)	ARCO Arena; 6,015	14–17
32	September 4	7:00pm	New York	NBA TV; MSG	88-85 (OT)	Jekabsone-Zogota (23)	Jekabsone-Zogota (7)	Whalen (7)	Mohegan Sun Arena; 6,685	15–17
33	September 11	7:00pm	@ Atlanta		64-88	Gruda (16)	Gruda (6)	4 players (2)	Philips Arena; 8,644	15–18
34	September 13	3:00pm	Indiana	WCTX	95-85	Gardin (23)	Gardin (8)	Phillips (7)	Mohegan Sun Arena; 9,047	16–18

All games are viewable on WNBA LiveAccess

== Depth ==
Pos.	Starter	Bench
C	Sandrine Gruda	Chante Black
PF	Asjha Jones	Tamika Whitmore
SF	Tan White	Amber Holt / Kerri Gardin
SG	Anete Jekabsone-Zogota	Erin Phillips
PG	Lindsay Whalen	Kiesha Brown

== Regular Season Statistics ==
Legend
GP	Games played	GS	Games started	MPG	Minutes per game	RPG	Rebounds per game
APG	Assists per game	SPG	Steals per game	BPG	Blocks per game	PPG	Points per game
FG%	Field-goal percentage	3P%	3-point field-goal percentage	FT%	Free-throw percentage	TO	Turnovers per game
PF	Fouls per game		Team leader		League leader

=== Player statistics ===
Player	GP	GS	MPG	RPG	APG	SPG	BPG	PPG
Chante Black	33	8	13.0	3.2	0.2	0.39	0.82	2.9
Kiesha Brown	34	0	11.6	1.6	1.1	0.38	0.09	3.8
Kristi Cirone	4	0	5.8	1.3	1.0	0.50	0.00	1.8
Lauren Ervin	8	0	7.0	1.6	0.0	0.13	0.00	2.0
Kerri Gardin	33	23	18.1	4.3	1.2	0.76	0.73	5.5
Sandrine Gruda	26	25	31.2	6.3	1.3	0.88	1.58	13.5
Amber Holt	23	7	16.5	3.2	1.9	0.39	0.09	6.0
Anete Jēkabsone-Žogota	27	16	23.9	2.9	2.2	0.33	0.00	9.4
Asjha Jones	23	23	31.6	5.9	2.4	0.87	0.57	16.7
Erin Phillips	32	18	23.1	3.2	2.1	1.34	0.09	8.1
Barbara Turner	7	0	20.6	2.1	2.0	0.71	0.00	4.0
Lindsay Whalen	34	34	29.4	4.6	4.6	1.26	0.15	12.3
Tan White	30	15	22.0	2.7	2.2	1.17	0.30	9.5
Tamika Whitmore	24	1	15.7	2.2	1.0	0.38	0.13	4.4

=== Team statistics ===
Team	FG%	3P%	FT%	RPG	APG	SPG	BPG	TO	PF	PPG
Connecticut Sun	.406	.316	.747	34.8	17.9	7.4	3.8	13.3	19.9	78.0
Opponents	.426	.322	.792	37.5	15.4	7.3	3.7	16.2	20.1	78.1

== Awards and honors ==
- Asjha Jones was named WNBA Eastern Conference Player of the Week for the week of July 20, 2009.
- Sandrine Gruda was named WNBA Eastern Conference Player of the Week for the week of August 17, 2009.
- Asjha Jones was named to the 2009 WNBA All-Star Team as an Eastern Conference reserve.

== Attendance ==
- A sellout for a basketball game at Mohegan Sun Arena is 9,518.

Regular Season Attendance
Year	Average: Home	Average: Away	High	Low	Sellouts	Total for Year	WNBA Game Average
2009	6,794 (12th)	7,761 (10th)	9,047	5,675	0	115,496	8,039
