= 2010 Connecticut Sun season =

- Head coach: Mike Thibault
- Arena: Mohegan Sun Arena

Results
- Record: 17–17 (.500)
- Place: 5th (Eastern)
- Playoff finish: Did not qualify

Media
- Television: CSN-NE; NBATV, ESPN2

The 2010 WNBA season was the 12th season for the Connecticut Sun franchise of the Women's National Basketball Association. It is their eighth in Connecticut.

== Transactions ==
=== Dispersal draft ===
Based on the Sun's 2009 record, they would pick 3rd in the Sacramento Monarchs dispersal draft. The Sun picked DeMya Walker.

=== WNBA draft ===
The following are the Sun's selections in the 2010 WNBA draft.

Round	Pick	Player	Nationality	School/Team/Country
1	1 (from N.Y, via L.A., via Minn.)	Tina Charles	United States	Connecticut
1	7 (from Tul.)	Danielle McCray	United States	Kansas
2	15	Allison Hightower	United States	LSU
3	27	Johannah Leedham	United Kingdom	Franklin Pierce

=== Transaction log ===
- January 12: The Sun traded Lindsay Whalen and the second overall pick in the 2010 Draft to the Minnesota Lynx in exchange for Renee Montgomery and the first overall pick in the 2010 Draft.
- February 2: The Sun signed free agent Kara Lawson and re-signed Anete Jekabsone-Zogota to multi-year contracts.
- February 10: The Sun signed Kerri Gardin to a training camp contract.
- February 23: The Sun re-signed Tan White.
- April 7: The Sun traded Amber Holt and Chante Black to the Tulsa Shock in exchange for the seventh pick in the 2010 Draft and a second-round pick in the 2011 Draft.
- April 8: The Sun announced that Erin Phillips would sit out the season.
- April 8: The Sun traded their first-round and a second-round pick in the 2011 Draft to the Minnesota Lynx in exchange for the draft rights to Kelsey Griffin.
- April 15: The Sun waived Tamika Whitmore.
- April 23: The Sun signed Sha Brooks, Alicia Gladden, May Kotsopoulos, Judie Lomax, Pauline Love and Kaitlin Sowinski to training camp contracts.
- April 26: The Sun signed Kailey Klein to a training camp contract.
- May 5: The Sun waived Sha Brooks.
- May 6: The Sun waived Kaitlin Sowinski, Pauline Love and Kailey Klein.
- May 14: The Sun waived May Kotsopoulos and Judie Lomax.

=== Trades ===
Date	Trade	
January 12, 2010	To Connecticut Sun	To Minnesota Lynx
January 12, 2010	Renee Montgomery and first overall pick in 2010 Draft	Lindsay Whalen and second overall pick in 2010 Draft
April 7, 2010	To Connecticut Sun	To Tulsa Shock
April 7, 2010	Seventh overall pick in 2010 Draft and second-round pick in 2011 Draft	Amber Holt and Chante Black
April 8, 2010	To Connecticut Sun	To Minnesota Lynx
April 8, 2010	Rights to Kelsey Griffin	First-round and second-round pick in 2011 Draft

=== Free agents ===
==== Additions ====
Player	Signed	Former team
DeMya Walker	December 14, 2009	Sacramento Monarchs
Renee Montgomery	January 12, 2010	Minnesota Lynx
Kara Lawson	February 2, 2010	Sacramento Monarchs
Anete Jekabsone-Zogota	February 2, 2010	re-signed
Kerri Gardin	February 10, 2010	re-signed
Tan White	February 23, 2010	re-signed
Kelsey Griffin	April 8, 2010	Minnesota Lynx

==== Subtractions ====
Player	Left	New team
Lindsay Whalen	January 12, 2010	Minnesota Lynx
Amber Holt	April 7, 2010	Tulsa Shock
Chante Black	April 7, 2010	Tulsa Shock
Erin Phillips	April 8, 2010	hiatus
Tamika Whitmore	April 15, 2010	free agent

== Roster ==
2010 Connecticut Sun roster
Players
Coaches

Pos.	No.	Nat.	Name	Height	Weight	From
C	31	(United States)	Charles, Tina	6' 4" (1.93m)	198 lb (90kg)	Connecticut
SF	41	(United States)	Gardin, Kerri	6' 1" (1.85m)	168 lb (76kg)	Virginia Tech
F	5	(United States)	Griffin, Kelsey	6' 2" (1.88m)	179 lb (81kg)	Nebraska
C	7	(France)	Gruda, Sandrine	6' 4" (1.93m)	185 lb (84kg)	France
G	23	(United States)	Hightower, Allison	5' 10" (1.78m)	139 lb (63kg)	LSU
SG	10	(Latvia)	Jēkabsone-Žogota, Anete	5' 9" (1.75m)	180 lb (82kg)	Latvia
PF	15	(United States)	Jones, Asjha	6' 2" (1.88m)	196 lb (89kg)	Connecticut
G	20	(United States)	Lawson, Kara	5' 8" (1.73m)	169 lb (77kg)	Tennessee
G	21	(United States)	Montgomery, Renee	5' 7" (1.7m)	143 lb (65kg)	Connecticut
F	22	(United States)	Walker, DeMya	6' 3" (1.91m)	200 lb (91kg)	Virginia
SG	14	(United States)	White, Tan	5' 7" (1.7m)	154 lb (70kg)	Mississippi State

Head coach
(United States) Mike Thibault (Saint Martin's)
Assistant coaches
(United States) Scott Hawk (Omaha)
(United States) Bernadette Mattox (Georgia)
Athletic trainer
(United States) Jeremy Norman (Keene State)
Strength and conditioning coach
(United States) Jodi Hopkins (Ohio)

Legend

- (C) Team captain
- (DP) Unsigned draft pick
- (FA) Free agent
- (S) Suspended
- Injured

WNBA roster page

=== Depth ===
Pos.	Starter	Bench
C	Tina Charles	Sandrine Gruda
PF	Asjha Jones	DeMya Walker / Kerri Gardin
SF	Kelsey Griffin	Anete Jekabsone-Zogota
SG	Kara Lawson	Tan White
PG	Renee Montgomery	Allison Hightower

== Season standings ==
Eastern Conference	W	L	PCT	GB	Home	Road	Conf.
Washington Mystics ^{x}	22	12	.647	–	13–4	9–8	13–9
New York Liberty ^{x}	22	12	.647	–	13–4	9–8	14–8
Indiana Fever ^{x}	21	13	.618	1.0	13–4	8–9	13–9
Atlanta Dream ^{x}	19	15	.559	3.0	10–7	9–8	10–12
Connecticut Sun ^{o}	17	17	.500	5.0	12–5	5–12	9–13
Chicago Sky ^{o}	14	20	.412	8.0	7–10	7–10	7–15

== Schedule ==
=== Preseason ===
2010 Game Log: Preseason

Game	Date	Time (ET)	Opponent	Score	High points	High rebounds	High assists	Location/Attendance	Record
1	May 4	11:00am	Atlanta	86-79	Charles (21)	Charles (9)	Montgomery (4)	Mohegan Sun Arena; 3,779	1-0
2	May 7	7:30pm	Poland National Team	89-46	Charles, Kotsopoulos (15)	Charles (9)	Montgomery (5)	Mohegan Sun Arena; 5,059	2-0
3	May 11	10:30am	@ New York	84-89 (3OT)	Charles (22)	Charles, Walker (13)	Lawson, Walker (4)	Madison Square Garden; 19,763	2-1

=== Regular season ===
2010 Game Log: Regular Season
May

Game	Date	Time (ET)	Opponent	TV	Score	High points	High rebounds	High assists	Location/Attendance	Record
1	May 15	3:30pm	Chicago	CN100	74-61	Jekabsone-Zogota (18)	Charles, Griffin (10)	Griffin, Lawson (3)	Mohegan Sun Arena; 8,072	1-0
2	May 21	7:00pm	@ Atlanta	NBATV; CSN-NE; FS-S	82-97	Charles (22)	Charles (11)	Montgomery (5)	Philips Arena; 4,092	1-1
3	May 23	3:00pm	Washington		80-65	White (15)	Charles (8)	Gardin (4)	Mohegan Sun Arena; 7,614	2-1
4	May 27	7:30pm	Minnesota		105-79	Montgomery (23)	Charles (10)	Lawson, Montgomery (6)	Mohegan Sun Arena; 6,401	3-1
5	May 30	4:00pm	@ Washington		65-69	Charles (13)	Charles (9)	Montgomery (4)	Verizon Center; 8,602	3-2

June

Game	Date	Time (ET)	Opponent	TV	Score	High points	High rebounds	High assists	Location/Attendance	Record
6	June 4	7:30pm	New York		75-68	White (18)	Charles (15)	Lawson (6)	Mohegan Sun Arena; 6,493	4-2
7	June 6	1:00pm	San Antonio		81-68	Charles (19)	Charles (11)	Lawson, White (6)	Mohegan Sun Arena; 6,292	5-2
8	June 11	7:30pm	Indiana	CSN-NE	86-77	Montgomery (29)	Charles (12)	Jekabsone-Zogota (5)	Mohegan Sun Arena; 7,603	6-2
9	June 13	6:00pm	@ Indiana		67-77	Montgomery (17)	Gruda (5)	Jekabsone-Zogota (3)	Conseco Fieldhouse; 7,302	6-3
10	June 18	10:30pm	@ Los Angeles		78-75	Charles (26)	Charles (19)	Jekabsone-Zogota, Jones, White (3)	STAPLES Center; 8,852	7-3
11	June 20	6:00pm	@ Phoenix	NBATV; FS-A	96-94	Charles (24)	Charles (12)	Lawson (5)	US Airways Center; 6,068	8-3
12	June 22	7:30pm	Chicago	CN100	77-86	Charles (14)	Charles (16)	Montgomery (6)	Mohegan Sun Arena; 6,981	8-4
13	June 25	7:30pm	Phoenix	CSN-NE	82-79	Charles (19)	Charles (23)	Montgomery (6)	Mohegan Sun Arena; 9,518	9-4
14	June 27	4:00pm	@ New York	CSN-NE	68-77	Lawson, Montgomery (13)	Charles (16)	Montgomery (5)	Madison Square Garden; 15,293	9-5
15	June 29	8:00pm	@ Tulsa	COX	101-89	Gruda, Lawson (17)	Charles (12)	Montgomery (5)	BOK Center; 3,649	10-5

July

Game	Date	Time	Opponent	TV	Score	High points	High rebounds	High assists	Location/Attendance	Record
16	July 1	8:00pm	@ Chicago	CN100	80-92	Gruda (17)	Gruda (7)	Montgomery (5)	Allstate Arena; 3,061	10-6
17	July 6	8:00pm	@ San Antonio	ESPN2	66-79	White (17)	Charles (13)	Lawson (4)	AT&T Center; 7,264	10-7
18	July 7	7:00pm	@ Atlanta	SSO	103-108 (OT)	Charles (27)	Charles (20)	Lawson (8)	Philips Arena; 5,305	10-8
19	July 14	1:00pm	@ Indiana		77-68	Gruda (21)	Griffin (8)	Lawson (5)	Conseco Fieldhouse; 10,076	11-8
20	July 17	7:00pm	Atlanta		96-80	Charles (22)	Charles (14)	White (7)	Mohegan Sun Arena; 7,378	12-8
21	July 20	8:00pm	New York	ESPN2	74-82 (OT)	Montgomery (23)	Griffin (9)	White (4)	Mohegan Sun Arena; 6,478	12-9
22	July 24	7:00pm	Los Angeles	CSN-NE	80-89	Montgomery (14)	Charles, Jones (9)	Lawson (4)	Mohegan Sun Arena; 8,097	12-10
23	July 27	7:30pm	Washington		88-78	Jones (23)	Charles (9)	Lawson (7)	Mohegan Sun Arena; 6,322	13-10
24	July 30	7:30pm	Atlanta		62-94	Jones (16)	Charles (12)	Lawson (5)	Mohegan Sun Arena; 7,003	13-11

August

Game	Date	Time	Opponent	TV	Score	High points	High rebounds	High assists	Location/Attendance	Record
25	August 1	4:00pm	@ New York	MSG	67-71	Jones (18)	Charles (10)	Montgomery (5)	Madison Square Garden; 9,341	13-12
26	August 3	8:00pm	@ Minnesota	CSN-NE	103-111 (OT)	Montgomery (33)	Charles (21)	Charles, Montgomery (4)	Target Center; 5,954	13-13
27	August 5	10:30pm	@ Seattle	ESPN2	82-83	Charles (23)	Jones (9)	Montgomery (10)	KeyArena; 7,539	13-14
28	August 8	5:00pm	Washington		76-67	Charles, Jones (17)	Charles (14)	Montgomery (7)	Mohegan Sun Arena; 7,076	14-14
29	August 10	7:00pm	@ Washington	NBATV; CSN-MA	74-84	Montgomery (17)	Charles (15)	Lawson, Montgomery, White (4)	Verizon Center; 8,180	14-15
30	August 13	7:30pm	Seattle		88-68	Jones (19)	Gruda (9)	Charles, Lawson, Montgomery (5)	Mohegan Sun Arena; 9,197	15-15
31	August 15	5:00pm	Indiana		66-79	Charles (18)	Charles (13)	Montgomery (8)	Mohegan Sun Arena; 7,915	15-16
32	August 17	7:30pm	Tulsa	CSN-NE	90-62	Montgomery (22)	Charles (10)	Charles (4)	Mohegan Sun Arena; 8,828	16-16
33	August 20	8:30pm	@ Chicago	NBATV; CN100	78-71	Montgomery (20)	Griffin (11)	Lawson (6)	Allstate Arena; 5,598	17-16
34	August 22	4:00pm	@ New York	MSG	87-88 (OT)	Charles (21)	Charles (13)	Jones, Montgomery (4)	Madison Square Garden; 15,989	17-17

All games are viewable on WNBA LiveAccess

== Statistics ==
Legend
GP	Games played	GS	Games started	MPG	Minutes per game	RPG	Rebounds per game
APG	Assists per game	SPG	Steals per game	BPG	Blocks per game	PPG	Points per game
FG%	Field-goal percentage	3P%	3-point field-goal percentage	FT%	Free-throw percentage	TO	Turnovers per game
PF	Fouls per game		Team leader		League leader

=== Regular season ===
Player	GP	GS	MPG	FG%	3P%	FT%	RPG	APG	SPG	BPG	PPG
Tina Charles	34	34	31.0	.487	.000	.763	11.7	1.5	0.74	1.68	15.5
Kerri Gardin	25	0	8.2	.270	.091	.667	1.2	0.6	0.36	0.12	1.2
Kelsey Griffin	34	19	20.0	.350	.271	.774	4.7	1.1	0.68	0.50	4.4
Sandrine Gruda	28	6	22.7	.491	.182	.760	4.5	1.2	0.68	0.75	11.5
Allison Hightower	20	1	10.4	.317	.167	.813	1.3	0.5	0.70	0.10	2.7
Anete Jekabsone-Zogota	20	14	17.6	.389	.351	1.000	2.0	1.7	0.45	0.25	7.2
Asjha Jones	30	29	25.8	.448	.300	.848	4.9	2.2	0.43	0.43	10.8
Kara Lawson	34	32	25.1	.409	.359	.895	2.6	3.5	0.41	0.00	8.3
Renee Montgomery	34	23	27.6	.401	.349	.855	2.2	4.1	1.38	0.09	13.3
DeMya Walker	31	2	11.0	.419	.000	.826	2.1	0.8	0.45	0.16	4.1
Tan White	34	10	25.2	.420	.366	.800	2.7	2.3	1.59	0.12	10.1

== Awards and honors ==
- Tina Charles was named WNBA Eastern Conference Player of the Week for the week of June 12, 2010.
- Tina Charles was named WNBA Rookie of the Month for May.
- Tina Charles was named WNBA Rookie of the Month for June.
- Tina Charles was named WNBA Rookie of the Month for July.
- Tina Charles was named WNBA Rookie of the Month for August.
- Tina Charles was named to the 2010 WNBA All-Star Team as a Team USA reserve.
- Renee Montgomery was named to the 2010 WNBA All-Star Team as a Team USA reserve.
- Tina Charles was named to the All-Rookie Team.
- Kelsey Griffin was named to the All-Rookie Team.
- Tina Charles was named to the All-WNBA Second Team.
