= Barbara Turner =

Barbara Turner may refer to:

- Barbara Turner (screenwriter) (1936–2016), American screenwriter and former actress
- Barbara Turner (basketball) (born 1984), American professional basketball player
