= 2008 Connecticut Sun season =

- Head coach: Mike Thibault
- Arena: Mohegan Sun Arena

Results
- Record: 21–13 (.618)
- Place: 2nd (Eastern)
- Playoff finish: Lost in First Round

Media
- Television: WCTX

The 2008 WNBA season was their tenth season and their sixth in Connecticut. The Sun successfully advanced to the WNBA Playoffs for the sixth consecutive season. Lindsay Whalen was a key contributor to the club, averaging 14.0 points per game, 5.6 rebounds per game, and 5.4 assists per game.

== Offseason ==
=== Expansion draft ===
The following player was lost in the Atlanta Dream expansion draft:

- Erika DeSouza

=== WNBA draft ===
| Round | Pick | Player | Nationality | School/Team/Country |
|---|---|---|---|---|
| 1 | 9 | Amber Holt | United States | Middle Tennessee |
| 1 | 12 (from Indiana) | Ketia Swanier | United States | Connecticut |
| 2 | 23 | Jolene Anderson | United States | Wisconsin |
| 3 | 37 | Lauren Ervin | United States | Arkansas |

=== Transactions ===
- August 27: The Sun signed Svetlana Abrosimova and waived Jolene Anderson.
- June 27: The Sun waived Kamesha Hairston.
- May 15: The Sun waived Cori Chambers.
- May 7: The Sun waived Jessica Foley, Tracy Gahan and Christina Quaye.
- May 6: The Sun waived Meredith Alexis and Natalie Berglin.
- April 28: The Sun waived Crystal Erwin, Laura Hall and Jessica Richter.
- April 23: The Sun waived Antoinette Upshaw.
- March 20: The Sun signed Tracy Gahan to a training camp contract.
- March 7: The Sun signed Sandrine Gruda.
- March 5: The Sun signed Jessica Foley to a training camp contract.
- March 3: The Sun signed Natalie Berglin and Kerri Gardin to training camp contracts.
- February 19: The Sun re-signed free agents Lindsay Whalen and Jamie Carey.

| Date | Trade | |
|---|---|---|
| February 19, 2008 | To Connecticut Sun | To Indiana Fever |
| February 19, 2008 | Tamika Whitmore, Jessica Foley, 12th pick in 2008 Draft | Katie Douglas |
| March 6, 2008 | To Connecticut Sun | To Houston Comets |
| March 6, 2008 | Barbara Turner | Megan Mahoney |
| March 14, 2008 | To Connecticut Sun | To Minnesota Lynx |
| March 14, 2008 | Tamika Raymond | Kristen Rasmussen |

=== Free agents ===
==== Additions ====
| Player | Signed | Former team |
| Lindsay Whalen | February 19, 2008 | re-signed |
| Jamie Carey | February 19, 2008 | re-signed |
| Tamika Whitmore | February 19, 2008 | Indiana Fever |
| Kerri Gardin | March 3, 2008 | free agent |
| Barbara Turner | March 6, 2008 | Houston Comets |
| Sandrine Gruda | March 7, 2008 | draft pick |
| Tamika Raymond | March 16, 2008 | Minnesota Lynx |
| Danielle Page | April 16, 2008 | undrafted rookie |
| Svetlana Abrosimova | August 27, 2008 | free agent |

==== Subtractions ====
| Player | Left | New team |
| Margo Dydek | October 4, 2007 | free agent |
| Katie Douglas | February 19, 2008 | Indiana Fever |
| Megan Mahoney | March 6, 2008 | Houston Comets |
| Le'Coe Willingham | March 10, 2008 | Phoenix Mercury |
| Nykesha Sales | March 11, 2008 | hiatus |
| Kristen Rasmussen | March 16, 2008 | Minnesota Lynx |
| Cori Chambers | May 15, 2008 | free agent |
| Kamesha Hairston | June 27, 2008 | free agent |
| Jolene Anderson | August 27, 2008 | free agent |

== Roster ==
2008 Connecticut Sun roster
Players
Coaches

| Pos. | No. | Nat. | Name | Height | Weight | From |
|---|---|---|---|---|---|---|
| SF | 25 | (Russia) | Abrosimova, Svetlana | 6' 2" (1.88m) | 172 lb (78kg) | Connecticut |
| PG | 10 | (United States) | Carey, Jamie | 5' 6" (1.68m) | 135 lb (61kg) | Texas |
| PF | | (United States) | Ervin, Lauren (injured) (DP) | 6' 3" (1.91m) | | Arkansas |
| SF | 41 | (United States) | Gardin, Kerri | 6' 1" (1.85m) | 165 lb (75kg) | Virginia Tech |
| C | 7 | (France) | Gruda, Sandrine | 6' 4" (1.93m) | 185 lb (84kg) | France |
| G/F | 1 | (United States) | Holt, Amber | 6' 0" (1.83m) | 167 lb (76kg) | Middle Tennessee |
| PF | 15 | (United States) | Jones, Asjha (C) | 6' 2" (1.88m) | 198 lb (90kg) | Connecticut |
| PF | 52 | (United States) | Page, Danielle | 6' 2" (1.88m) | 179 lb (81kg) | Nebraska |
| PG | 31 | (Australia) | Phillips, Erin | 5' 7" (1.7m) | 162 lb (73kg) | Australia |
| PF | 34 | (United States) | Raymond, Tamika | 6' 2" (1.88m) | 199 lb (90kg) | Connecticut |
| G/F | 42 | (United States) | Sales, Nykesha (injured) | 6' 0" (1.83m) | 175 lb (79kg) | Connecticut |
| PG | 11 | (United States) | Swanier, Ketia | 5' 7" (1.7m) | 144 lb (65kg) | Connecticut |
| G/F | 22 | (United States) | Turner, Barbara | 6' 0" (1.83m) | 182 lb (83kg) | Connecticut |
| PG | 13 | (United States) | Whalen, Lindsay (C) | 5' 9" (1.75m) | 150 lb (68kg) | Minnesota |
| PF | 00 | (United States) | Whitmore, Tamika | 6' 2" (1.88m) | 190 lb (86kg) | Memphis |

Head coach
(United States) Mike Thibault (Saint Martin's)
Assistant coaches
(United States) Scott Hawk (Omaha)
(United States) Bernadette Mattox (Georgia)
Athletic trainer
(United States) Jeremy Norman (Keene State)
Strength and conditioning coach
(United States) Jodi Hopkins (Ohio)

Legend

- (C) Team captain
- (DP) Unsigned draft pick
- (FA) Free agent
- (S) Suspended
- Injured

== Season standings ==
| Eastern Conference | W | L | PCT | GB | Home | Road | Conf. |
|---|---|---|---|---|---|---|---|
| Detroit Shock ^{x} | 22 | 12 | .647 | – | 14–3 | 8–9 | 16–4 |
| Connecticut Sun ^{x} | 21 | 13 | .618 | 1.0 | 13–4 | 8–9 | 13–7 |
| New York Liberty ^{x} | 19 | 15 | .559 | 3.0 | 11–6 | 8–9 | 11–9 |
| Indiana Fever ^{x} | 17 | 17 | .500 | 5.0 | 11–6 | 6–11 | 12–8 |
| Chicago Sky ^{o} | 12 | 22 | .353 | 10.0 | 8–9 | 4–13 | 10–10 |
| Washington Mystics ^{o} | 10 | 24 | .294 | 12.0 | 6–11 | 4–13 | 6–14 |
| Atlanta Dream ^{o} | 4 | 30 | .118 | 18.0 | 1–16 | 3–14 | 2–18 |

== Schedule ==
=== Preseason ===
2008 Game Log: Preseason

| Game | Date | Opponent | TV | Score | High points | High rebounds | High assists | Location/Attendance | Record |
|---|---|---|---|---|---|---|---|---|---|
| 1 | May 1 | @ Minnesota | | L 57-68 | Gardin (8) | Gahan, Gardin, Holt (4) | Carey, Hairston, Turner (2) | Target Center; 1,155 | 0–1 |
| 2 | May 4 | Phoenix | | W 94-66 | Holt (15) | Gahan (10) | Swanier, Berglin (3) | Mohegan Sun Arena; 6,252 | 1-1 |
| 3 | May 9 | Houston | | W 88-80 | Whalen (18) | Anderson (7) | Whalen (8) | Mohegan Sun Arena; 4,411 | 2–1 |

=== Regular season ===
2008 Game Log: Regular Season
May

| Game | Date | Opponent | TV | Score | High points | High rebounds | High assists | Location/Attendance | Record |
|---|---|---|---|---|---|---|---|---|---|
| 1 | May 17 | Atlanta | CSS | W 100-67 | Whitmore (22) | Whitmore (10) | Whalen (8) | Mohegan Sun Arena; 7,420 | 1–0 |
| 2 | May 18 | @ New York | WCTX; NBA TV | W 77-63 | Whitmore (17) | Whalen, Raymond (6) | Whalen (8) | Madison Square Garden; 10,460 | 2–0 |
| 3 | May 24 | Sacramento | | W 87-64 | Whalen (21) | Holt (7) | Whalen, Whitmore (5) | Mohegan Sun Arena; 6,402 | 3–0 |
| 4 | May 27 | Indiana | ESPN2 | L 46-75 | Whalen (11) | Jones (7) | Whalen (5) | Mohegan Sun Arena; 5,245 | 3–1 |
| 5 | May 30 | New York | MSG; NBA TV | W 89-84 | Whitmore (18) | Whalen (6) | Whalen (7) | Mohegan Sun Arena; 7,052 | 4–1 |

June

| Game | Date | Opponent | TV | Score | High points | High rebounds | High assists | Location/Attendance | Record |
|---|---|---|---|---|---|---|---|---|---|
| 6 | June 1 | @ Chicago | | W 75-73 | Whalen, Whitmore (19) | Whalen (7) | Whalen (7) | UIC Pavilion; 2,276 | 5–1 |
| 7 | June 6 | Minnesota | | W 78-77 | Jones (25) | Whalen (9) | Anderson, Gardin (5) | Mohegan Sun Arena; 6,327 | 6–1 |
| 8 | June 8 | Washington | WCTX; NBA TV | W 87-79 | Jones (16) | Whalen (7) | Whalen (7) | Mohegan Sun Arena; 7,174 | 7–1 |
| 9 | June 10 | @ Minnesota | ESPN2 | W 75-66 | Jones (18) | Whitmore (12) | Whalen (6) | Target Center; 7,186 | 8–1 |
| 10 | June 13 | @ Los Angeles | | L 93-98 (OT) | Whalen (20) | Whalen (7) | Jones (3) | STAPLES Center; 8,702 | 8–2 |
| 11 | June 16 | @ Seattle | WCTX; NBA TV | W 74-67 | Jones (15) | Raymond (9) | Whitmore (4) | KeyArena; 6,872 | 9–2 |
| 12 | June 18 | @ Phoenix | | L 81-102 | Jones (18) | Turner (5) | Whalen (5) | US Airways Center; 4,478 | 9–3 |
| 13 | June 20 | @ Sacramento | | W 72-56 | Jones (14) | Whalen, Anderson (6) | Whalen (5) | ARCO Arena; 5,895 | 10–3 |
| 14 | June 24 | Detroit | WCTX; NBA TV | W 85-68 | Jones (20) | Holt (8) | Whalen (6) | Mohegan Sun Arena; 7,501 | 11–3 |
| 15 | June 26 | @ Detroit | FSN-D | L 61-70 | Jones (14) | Jones (7) | Whalen (4) | Mohegan Sun Arena; 7,501 | 11–4 |
| 16 | June 27 | Atlanta | | W 109-101 (OT) | Jones (30) | Jones, Whalen (10) | Holt (8) | Mohegan Sun Arena; 7,612 | 12–4 |
| 17 | June 29 | Phoenix | | L 80-87 | Jones (16) | Jones (9) | Whalen (8) | Mohegan Sun Arena; 9,518 (sellout) | 12–5 |

July

| Game | Date | Opponent | TV | Score | High points | High rebounds | High assists | Location/Attendance | Record |
|---|---|---|---|---|---|---|---|---|---|
| 18 | July 1 | Houston | | W 78-68 | Jones (15) | Turner (9) | Whalen (9) | Mohegan Sun Arena; 6,357 | 13–5 |
| 19 | July 5 | @ Indiana | FSN-I; NBA TV | L 74-81 | Jones (20) | Gardin (9) | Jones, Whalen (3) | Conseco Fieldhouse; 6,329 | 13–6 |
| 20 | July 8 | @ Detroit | FSN-D | L 82-88 | Jones (21) | Whalen (7) | Jones, Whalen (8) | Palace of Auburn Hills; 7,623 | 13–7 |
| 21 | July 13 | @ Washington | ABC | L 64-69 | Whalen (33) | Whalen (8) | Jones, Whalen (6) | Verizon Center; 9,610 | 13–8 |
| 22 | July 15 | New York | ESPN2 | L 71-77 | Whalen (19) | Jones (9) | Jones (5) | Mohegan Sun Arena; 8,244 | 13–9 |
| 23 | July 18 | @ Chicago | WCTX; NBA TV | L 65-73 | Jones (18) | Gruda (11) | Jones, Swanier (3) | UIC Pavilion; 3,379 | 13–10 |
| 24 | July 20 | Chicago | | W 74-67 | Jones (23) | Jones (10) | Whalen (6) | Mohegan Sun Arena; 7,367 | 14–10 |
| 25 | July 24 | Los Angeles | WCTX; NBA TV | W 87-61 | Whalen (22) | Jones (8) | Whalen (4) | Mohegan Sun Arena; 9,518 (sellout) | 15–10 |
| 26 | July 27 | @ Washington | CSN-MA; NBA TV | W 82-60 | Jones (27) | Whalen (8) | Whalen (7) | Verizon Center; 9,357 | 16–10 |

August

| Game | Date | Opponent | TV | Score | High points | High rebounds | High assists | Location/Attendance | Record |
|---|---|---|---|---|---|---|---|---|---|
Summer Olympic break
| 27 | August 28 | @ Indiana | FSN-I; NBA TV | W 84-58 | Whitmore (15) | Turner, Raymond (5) | Gruda, Jones (4) | Conseco Fieldhouse; 6,435 | 17–10 |
| 28 | August 29 | @ Atlanta | | W 98-72 | Whitmore (27) | Whitmore (6) | Whalen (8) | Philips Arena; 11,442 (sellout) | 18–10 |
| 29 | August 31 | Seattle | ABC | W 80-76 | Jones (20) | Holt (5) | Gardin (4) | Mohegan Sun Arena; 9,518 (sellout) | 19–10 |

September

| Game | Date | Opponent | TV | Score | High points | High rebounds | High assists | Location/Attendance | Record |
|---|---|---|---|---|---|---|---|---|---|
| 30 | September 5 | Chicago | | W 80-75 | Whitmore (17) | Jones (6) | Whalen (6) | Mohegan Sun Arena; 8,088 | 20–10 |
| 31 | September 7 | San Antonio | ABC | L 73-85 | Jones (22) | Jones (9) | Abrosimova (6) | Mohegan Sun Arena; 7,956 | 20–11 |
| 32 | September 9 | @ Houston | WCTX | L 68-75 | Jones (22) | Whalen (8) | Whalen (5) | Reliant Arena; 5,769 | 20–12 |
| 33 | September 11 | @ San Antonio | | L 74-78 | Jones (18) | Gardin (14) | Carey (7) | AT&T Center; 6,791 | 20–13 |
| 34 | September 13 | Washington | WCTX; NBA TV | W 87-81 | Phillips (18) | Phillips (8) | Gruda, Swanier (4) | Mohegan Sun Arena; 8,652 | 21–13 |

=== Playoffs ===
In the first round of the Eastern Conference Playoffs, the Sun had to face the New York Liberty. Since the Sun had the better record, the series would be played with game 1 at New York, game 2 at Connecticut, and game 3 (if needed) at Connecticut. The Liberty won the first game, but the Sun won the second to force a game three. The Sun were upset on their home floor by the Liberty and were eliminated from the playoffs.

- For the sixth consecutive season, the Sun advance to the playoffs.
- For the second consecutive season, the Sun do not advance to the Eastern Conference Finals.

2008 Game Log: Postseason
Eastern Conference Semifinals

| Game | Date | Opponent | TV | Score | High points | High rebounds | High assists | Location/Attendance | Series |
|---|---|---|---|---|---|---|---|---|---|
| 1 | September 18 | @ New York | MSG; NBA TV | L 63-72 | Whitmore (16) | Jones, Whitmore (6) | Whalen (6) | Madison Square Garden; 7,649 | 0–1 |
| 2 | September 20 | New York | MSG; NBA TV | W 73-70 | Jones (16) | Whitmore (6) | Whalen (4) | Mohegan Sun Arena; 7,234 | 1-1 |
| 3 | September 22 | New York | ESPN2 | L 62-66 | Whalen (19) | Jones (11) | Whitmore (4) | Mohegan Sun Arena; 6,011 | 1–2 |

== Depth ==
| Pos. | Starter | Bench | Inactive |
|---|---|---|---|
| C | Tamika Whitmore | Sandrine Gruda | Danielle Page |
| PF | Asjha Jones | Tamika Raymond |
| SF | Kerri Gardin | Barbara Turner -- Amber Holt |
| SG | Svetlana Abrosimova | Erin Phillips | Ketia Swanier |
| PG | Lindsay Whalen | Jamie Carey |

== Regular Season statistics ==
Legend
| GP | Games played | GS | Games started | MPG | Minutes per game | RPG | Rebounds per game |
| APG | Assists per game | SPG | Steals per game | BPG | Blocks per game | PPG | Points per game |
| FG% | Field-goal percentage | 3P% | 3-point field-goal percentage | FT% | Free-throw percentage | TO | Turnovers per game |
| PF | Fouls per game | | Team leader | | League leader |

=== Player statistics ===
| Player | GP | GS | MPG | RPG | APG | SPG | BPG | PPG |
|---|---|---|---|---|---|---|---|---|
| Svetlana Abrosimova | 6 | 0 | 17.8 | 3.3 | 2.0 | 1.33 | 0.00 | 5.7 |
| Jolene Anderson | 24 | 7 | 15.3 | 2.4 | 1.1 | 0.29 | 0.04 | 4.0 |
| Jamie Carey | 33 | 3 | 15.1 | 1.2 | 1.4 | 0.24 | 0.03 | 4.2 |
| Kerri Gardin | 34 | 15 | 15.9 | 3.3 | 1.2 | 0.85 | 0.21 | 4.0 |
| Sandrine Gruda | 31 | 1 | 15.4 | 3.5 | 0.9 | 0.61 | 0.84 | 6.2 |
| Amber Holt | 34 | 34 | 21.0 | 3.1 | 1.9 | 0.44 | 0.15 | 6.5 |
| Asjha Jones | 33 | 33 | 29.2 | 6.1 | 2.5 | 0.61 | 0.79 | 17.0 |
| Danielle Page | 3 | 0 | 4.0 | 2.0 | 0.0 | 0.00 | 0.00 | 2.0 |
| Erin Phillips | 8 | 0 | 10.8 | 2.1 | 0.4 | 0.50 | 0.13 | 5.1 |
| Tamika Raymond | 34 | 1 | 11.0 | 2.9 | 0.4 | 0.29 | 0.03 | 2.5 |
| Ketia Swanier | 25 | 6 | 9.2 | 1.2 | 1.0 | 0.56 | 0.04 | 1.6 |
| Barbara Turner | 34 | 6 | 19.5 | 3.2 | 1.5 | 0.35 | 0.41 | 8.0 |
| Lindsay Whalen | 31 | 31 | 29.3 | 5.6 | 5.4 | 1.45 | 0.03 | 14.0 |
| Tamika Whitmore | 34 | 33 | 26.8 | 4.7 | 1.4 | 0.59 | 0.38 | 12.6 |

=== Team statistics ===
| Team | FG% | 3P% | FT% | RPG | APG | SPG | BPG | TO | PF | PPG |
|---|---|---|---|---|---|---|---|---|---|---|
| Connecticut Sun | .422 | .330 | .746 | 36.4 | 17.9 | 6.2 | 2.8 | 14.3 | 18.5 | 79.1 |
| Opponents | .418 | .321 | .740 | 35.3 | 16.3 | 7.4 | 3.1 | 14.7 | 20.7 | 74.7 |

=== Team Ranking ===
This table shows how the Sun rank compared to the other teams in the league (14 total teams):

| FG% | 3P% | FT% | RPG | APG | SPG | BPG | TO | PF | PPG |
|---|---|---|---|---|---|---|---|---|---|
| 8th | 8th | 12th | 3rd | 2nd | 14th | 12th | 13th | 13th | 3rd |

== Playoffs statistics ==
=== Player statistics ===
| Player | GP | GS | MPG | RPG | APG | SPG | BPG | PPG |
|---|---|---|---|---|---|---|---|---|
| Svetlana Abrosimova | 3 | 2 | 21.0 | 3.7 | 1.3 | 1.33 | 0.00 | 8.0 |
| Jamie Carey | 1 | 0 | 00.0 | 0.0 | 0.0 | 0.00 | 0.00 | 0.0 |
| Kerri Gardin | 3 | 3 | 19.0 | 2.3 | 1.0 | 1.67 | 0.33 | 3.7 |
| Sandrine Gruda | 3 | 0 | 8.7 | 1.3 | 0.3 | 0.33 | 0.00 | 2.7 |
| Amber Holt | 3 | 1 | 18.3 | 4.0 | 1.3 | 0.33 | 0.00 | 3.7 |
| Asjha Jones | 3 | 3 | 32.3 | 7.3 | 1.3 | 0.67 | 0.33 | 15.0 |
| Danielle Page | 0 | 0 | 0.0 | 0.0 | 0.0 | 0.00 | 0.00 | 0.0 |
| Erin Phillips | 3 | 0 | 12.0 | 0.7 | 1.7 | 1.00 | 0.33 | 3.0 |
| Tamika Raymond | 3 | 0 | 9.3 | 2.3 | 0.3 | 0.33 | 0.33 | 1.3 |
| Ketia Swanier | 0 | 0 | 00.0 | 0.0 | 0.0 | 0.00 | 0.00 | 0.0 |
| Barbara Turner | 3 | 0 | 19.0 | 3.3 | 0.3 | 0.00 | 0.33 | 5.3 |
| Lindsay Whalen | 3 | 3 | 30.0 | 4.7 | 4.0 | 1.33 | 0.00 | 13.3 |
| Tamika Whitmore | 3 | 3 | 29.0 | 4.7 | 2.0 | 1.33 | 0.00 | 10.0 |

=== Team statistics ===
| Team | FG% | 3P% | FT% | RPG | APG | SPG | BPG | TO | PF | PPG |
|---|---|---|---|---|---|---|---|---|---|---|
| Connecticut Sun | .360 | .218 | .800 | 34.3 | 13.7 | 7.3 | 1.7 | 12.3 | 15.7 | 63.0 |
| New York Liberty | .448 | .433 | .606 | 33.7 | 16.3 | 6.7 | 5.0 | 18.7 | 18.7 | 69.3 |

== Awards and honors ==
- Head coach Mike Thibault was named 2008 WNBA Coach of the Year.
- Lindsay Whalen was named to the All-WNBA First Team.
- Asjha Jones was named to the All-WNBA Second Team.
- Amber Holt was named to the All-Rookie Team.
- Lindsay Whalen was given the Peak Performer award (for assists) for leading the league in assists per game (5.4).
- Lindsay Whalen was the second player in WNBA history to average at least 10 points, 5 rebounds, and 5 assists per game for the season. Only Nikki Teasley has previously accomplished this feat.
- Lindsay Whalen was named WNBA Eastern Conference Player of the Week for the week of May 27, 2008.
- Asjha Jones was named WNBA Eastern Conference Player of the Week for the week of June 30, 2008.
- Lindsay Whalen was named WNBA Eastern Conference Player of the Week for the week of July 14, 2008.
- Asjha Jones was named WNBA Eastern Conference Player of the Week for the week of July 28, 2008.

== Attendance ==
- A sellout for a basketball game at Mohegan Sun Arena is 9,518.

Regular Season Attendance
| Year | Average: Home | Average: Away | High | Low | Sellouts | Total for Year | WNBA Game Average |
|---|---|---|---|---|---|---|---|
| 2008 | 7,644 (11th) | 7,132 (14th) | 9,518 | 5,245 | 3 | 129,951 | 7,948 |
