= Kerri Gardin =

American basketball player (born 1984)

Personal information
- Born: May 19, 1984 (age 42) Burke County, North Carolina, U.S.
- Listed height: 6 ft 1 in (1.85 m)
- Listed weight: 170 lb (77 kg)

Career information
- High school: Freedom (Morganton, North Carolina)
- College: Virginia Tech (2002–2006)
- WNBA draft: 2006: 3rd round, 34th overall pick
- Drafted by: Chicago Sky
- Playing career: 2008–2011
- Position: Forward

Career history
- 2008–2010: Connecticut Sun
- 2011: Washington Mystics

Career highlights
- North Carolina Miss Basketball (2002)
- Stats at WNBA.com
- Stats at Basketball Reference

Kerri Gardin (born May 19, 1984) is an American former professional basketball player who played in the Women's National Basketball Association (WNBA) with the Connecticut Sun and Washington Mystics.

== Early life and college career ==
Gardin was born in Burke County, North Carolina. As a senior at Freedom High School in Morganton, North Carolina, she led the girls basketball team to win the 2002 NCHSAA 4A state championship and was named North Carolina Miss Basketball for the 2001–02 season.

At Virginia Tech, Gardin led her Hokies to four consecutive NCAA appearances. As a senior, she averaged a double-double with 12.7 points and 10.0 rebounds per game. Her performance at the university led to her induction into the Virginia Tech Sports Hall of Fame.

Gardin is currently employed as an assistant women's basketball at coach Mars Hill University in Mars Hill, North Carolina.

== WNBA career ==
Gardin was drafted 34th overall in the 2006 WNBA draft by the Chicago Sky. Before the season started, the Sky waived her. Before the 2007 WNBA season, Gardin was signed by the Seattle Storm. Like in Chicago, she was waived by the Storm before seeing any regular season action. In 2008, the Connecticut Sun signed Gardin as a free agent. She retained a roster spot and went on to start 15 games, helping the Sun post a 21–13 overall record. In the 2008 WNBA Playoffs, Gardin ranked first in the league in steals per turnover (5.0).

She played for Jolly JBS Sibenik in Croatia during the 2008–09 WNBA off-season.

== Career statistics ==
=== WNBA career statistics ===
Legend
GP	Games played	GS	Games started	MPG	Minutes per game	RPG	Rebounds per game
APG	Assists per game	SPG	Steals per game	BPG	Blocks per game	PPG	Points per game
TO	Turnovers per game	FG%	Field-goal percentage	3P%	3-point field-goal percentage	FT%	Free-throw percentage
**Bold**	Career best	°	League leader

==== Regular season ====
Year	Team	GP	GS	MPG	FG%	3P%	FT%	RPG	APG	SPG	BPG	TO	PPG
2008	Connecticut	**34**	15	15.9	35.3	**37.5**	53.7	3.3	**1.2**	**0.9**	0.2	1.3	4.0
2009	Connecticut	33	**23**	**18.1**	**36.5**	25.6	60.7	**4.3**	**1.2**	0.8	**0.7**	1.2	**5.5**
2010	Connecticut	25	0	8.2	27.0	9.1	**66.7**	1.2	0.6	0.4	0.1	**0.4**	1.2
2011	Washington	28	5	14.0	23.7	0.0	51.7	2.7	1.0	**0.9**	0.5	0.9	1.5
Career	4 years, 2 teams	120	43	14.4	33.2	28.1	57.9	3.0	1.0	0.7	0.4	1.0	3.2

==== Playoffs ====
Year	Team	GP	GS	MPG	FG%	3P%	FT%	RPG	APG	SPG	BPG	TO	PPG
2008	Connecticut	3	3	19.0	40.0	33.3	50.0	2.3	1.0	1.7	0.3	0.3	3.7
Career	1 years, 1 team	3	3	19.0	40.0	33.3	50.0	2.3	1.0	1.7	0.3	0.3	3.7

=== College career statistics ===
Legend
GP	Games played	GS	Games started	MPG	Minutes per game
FG%	Field goal percentage	3P%	3-point field goal percentage	FT%	Free throw percentage
RPG	Rebounds per game	APG	Assists per game	SPG	Steals per game
BPG	Blocks per game	PPG	Points per game	**Bold**	Career high

Year	Team	GP	Points	FG%	3P%	FT%	RPG	APG	SPG	BPG	PPG
2002–03	Virginia Tech	30	130	40.2	–	63.2	3.2	1.7	0.8	0.7	4.3
2003–04	Virginia Tech	**31**	242	34.4	33.3	**67.4**	5.4	**2.9**	1.2	0.5	7.8
2004–05	Virginia Tech	29	322	44.9	24.1	61.5	8.0	1.7	1.3	**1.0**	11.1
2005–06	Virginia Tech	29	**367**	**45.0**	**35.3**	59.2	**10.0**	2.4	**2.0**	0.9	**12.7**
Career	Virginia Tech	119	1061	41.7	28.8	62.7	6.6	2.2	1.3	0.8	8.9
