= Jolene Anderson (basketball) =

American basketball player (born 1986)

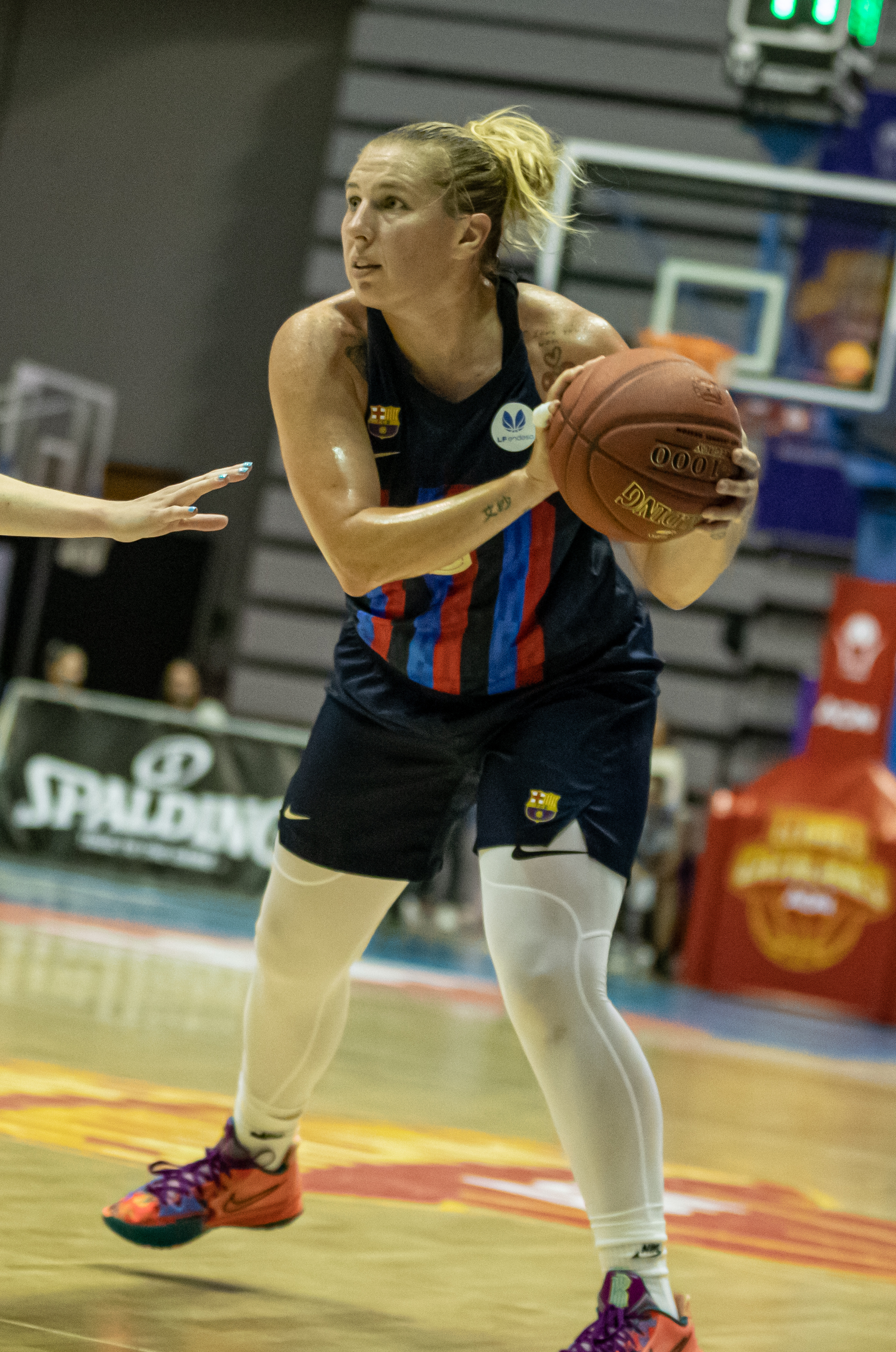

Personal information
- Born: July 22, 1986 (age 40) Superior, Wisconsin, U.S.
- Listed height: 5 ft 8 in (1.73 m)

Career information
- High school: South Shore (Port Wing, Wisconsin)
- College: Wisconsin (2004–2008)
- WNBA draft: 2008: 2nd round, 23rd overall pick
- Drafted by: Connecticut Sun
- Playing career: 2008–present
- Position: Shooting guard

Career history
- 2008: Connecticut Sun
- 2008–2010: ESB Villeneuve-d'Ascq
- 2010–2011: Botasspor Adana
- 2011–2012: Lotos Gdynia
- 2012–2013: Homend Antakya Belediyesi
- 2013–2018: Famila Wuber Schio
- 2018–2020: Reyer Venezia
- 2019; 2021–2022: Wisconsin Glo
- 2020–2021: Fila San Martino Di Lupari
- 2021–2022: ESB Villeneuve-d'Ascq
- 2022–2024: Barca CBS
- 2023: Norths Bears
- 2024: Halcones de Xalapa

Career highlights
- NBL1 East champion (2023); NBL1 East Finals MVP (2023); NBL1 National Finals All-Star Five (2023); 3× Italian Serie A1 champion (2015, 2016, 2018); 4× Italian Supercup winner (2014, 2016–2018); 3× Italian Cup winner (2015, 2017, 2018); Italian Cup MVP (2017); Frances Pomeroy Naismith Award (2008); Big Ten co-Player of the Year (2008); 2× All-Big Ten First Team (2007, 2008); Big Ten Freshman of the Year (2005); Big Ten All-Freshman Team (2005); Wisconsin Miss Basketball (2004)
- Stats at Basketball Reference
Medals
Women's basketball
Representing the United States
FIBA Under-19 World Cup
Gold medal – first place	2005 Tunisia	Team

Jolene Nancy Anderson (born July 22, 1986) is an American professional basketball player. She was drafted by the Connecticut Sun in the 2008 WNBA draft.

== College career ==
Anderson played four seasons of college basketball for the Wisconsin Badgers. With 2,312 total points, she is the all-time leading scorer in Badgers women's history. She studied sociology at Wisconsin.

== Career statistics ==
Legend
GP	Games played	GS	Games started	MPG	Minutes per game	RPG	Rebounds per game
APG	Assists per game	SPG	Steals per game	BPG	Blocks per game	PPG	Points per game
TO	Turnovers per game	FG%	Field-goal percentage	3P%	3-point field-goal percentage	FT%	Free-throw percentage
**Bold**	Career best	°	League leader

=== WNBA ===
==== Regular season ====
Year	Team	GP	GS	MPG	FG%	3P%	FT%	RPG	APG	SPG	BPG	TO	PPG
2008	Connecticut	24	7	15.3	27.8	23.2	73.3	2.4	1.1	0.3	0.0	0.7	4.0
Career	1 year, 1 team	24	7	15.3	27.8	23.2	73.3	2.4	1.1	0.3	0.0	0.7	4.0

=== College ===
Legend
GP	Games played	GS	Games started	MPG	Minutes per game
FG%	Field goal percentage	3P%	3-point field goal percentage	FT%	Free throw percentage
RPG	Rebounds per game	APG	Assists per game	SPG	Steals per game
BPG	Blocks per game	PPG	Points per game	**Bold**	Career high

Year	Team	GP	Points	FG%	3P%	FT%	RPG	APG	SPG	BPG	PPG
2004-05	Wisconsin Badgers	28	497	43.2	32.1	85.2	5.6	3.4	1.4	0.2	17.8
2005-06	Wisconsin	29	503	39.7	**33.3**	74.7	7.0	3.4	2.1	0.2	17.3
2006-07	Wisconsin	**36**	**714**	43.3	32.2	83.9	7.1	2.9	**2.5**	0.3	19.8
2007-08	Wisconsin	30	598	**43.7**	32.2	**86.5**	**7.7**	**3.7**	1.7	0.3	**19.9**
Career	Wisconsin	123	2312	42.5	32.5	82.7	6.9	3.3	2.0	0.3	18.8

== Professional career ==
Anderson was drafted by the Connecticut Sun in the 2008 WNBA draft and played 24 games for the team during the 2008 WNBA season.

Anderson played the 2008–09 and 2009–10 seasons in France with ESB Villeneuve-d'Ascq. She then played in Turkey for Botasspor Adana in 2010–11, in Poland for Lotos Gdynia in 2011–12, and then back in Turkey for Homend Antakya Belediyesi in 2012–13. Between 2013 and 2018, she played five seasons in Italy for Famila Wuber Schio. She continued in Italy between 2018 and 2021, playing two seasons for Reyer Venezia (2018–20) and one for Fila San Martino Di Lupari (2020–21). For the 2021–22 season, she returned to ESB Villeneuve-d'Ascq in France. She then played in Spain for Barca CBS in 2022–23. She also played for the Wisconsin Glo in the GWBA in 2019, 2021 and 2022.

In 2023, Anderson played for the Norths Bears of the NBL1 East in Australia. She helped the Bears win the championship and earned Finals MVP. She went on to earn NBL1 National Finals All-Star Five honours. She returned to Barca CBS for the 2023–24 season.
