= Asjha Jones =

American basketball player (born 1980)

Portland Trail Blazers
- Positions: Director of Basketball Strategy & Planning
- League: NBA

Personal information
- Born: August 1, 1980 (age 46) Piscataway, New Jersey, U.S.
- Listed height: 6 ft 2 in (1.88 m)
- Listed weight: 187 lb (85 kg)

Career information
- High school: Piscataway (Piscataway, New Jersey)
- College: UConn (1998–2002)
- WNBA draft: 2002: 1st round, 4th overall pick
- Drafted by: Washington Mystics
- Playing career: 2002–2015
- Coaching career: 2020–present

Career history

Playing
- 2002–2003: Washington Mystics
- 2003–2004: Delta Basket Alessandria
- 2004–2012: Connecticut Sun
- 2005–2007: Dynamo Novosibirsk
- 2007–2010: UMMC Ekaterinburg
- 2011–2012: Rivas Ecópolis
- 2012–2013: Kayseri Kaski S.K.
- 2013: Spartak Moscow
- 2014: Good Angels Košice
- 2015: Elitzur Ramla
- 2015: Minnesota Lynx

Coaching
- 2018–2019: Washington Mystics (player development)
- 2020–2021: Washington Mystics (assistant)

Career highlights
- WNBA champion (2015); 2× WNBA All-Star (2007, 2009); All-WNBA Second Team (2008); No. 15 Retired by retired by Connecticut Sun; EuroLeague Women Final Eight MVP (2012); NCAA champion (2000, 2002); Third-team All-American – AP (2002); Big East Tournament MOP (2002); First-team All-Big East (2002); Big East All-Freshman Team (1999)
- Stats at WNBA.com
- Stats at Basketball Reference
Medals
Women's basketball
Representing United States
FIBA World Championship for Women
Gold medal – first place	2010 Brazil	Team competition
Olympics
Gold medal – first place	2012 London	Team competition

Asjha Takera Jones (born August 1, 1980) is an American former professional women's basketball power forward and coach who is now on the staff of the Portland Trail Blazers in the National Basketball Association (NBA). In 2019, she became the first person to win a WNBA title as both a player and a coach.

Jones is one of 11 women to receive an Olympic gold medal, an NCAA Championship, a Fiba World cup gold and a WNBA Championship.

== Early years ==
At the age of three, Jones began playing basketball in a local park. Born in Piscataway, New Jersey, she began playing AAU ball at the age of eleven, but she was playing neighborhood ball before then. She tried to interest the girls in playing, but couldn't convince them, so she played basketball with the boys. By the age of twelve, she reached her adult height, so she was taller than most of her teammates, boys and girls. Her shoe matched her age for a time, until she peaked out at size 13.

She started going to basketball camps at an early age, including one at Rutgers while she was in fifth grade. When she was in eighth grade, she was good enough to win the MVP of her summer league, despite playing with high school age participants.

== High school and AAU ==
Jones attended Piscataway High School, where she set the school record of points and rebounds with 2,266 and 1,256 respectively. As a senior, Jones played on the high school team that went to the stale finals. In the semi-final game against the Shawnee Renegades, the opposing team knew they had to contain Jones. While they were successful in limiting her shots from the field (Jones was 3 for 18), they could not stop her rebounding or free throw shooting. Jones had 15 rebounds and hit 6 of 7 free throws to help lead the Piscataway team past Shawnee and on to the finals.

In high school, she was a McDonald's All-American and The Star-Ledger New Jersey Girls Basketball Player of the Year, earning her a scholarship to the University of Connecticut. Jones was named a WBCA All-American. She participated in the WBCA High School All-America Game, where she scored seven points.

Jones came to the attention of a local AAU coach, Rich Leary, when she was a freshman in high school. At the time, there was an AAU team for boys, but not one for girls. So initially, she played with the boys. Leary formed a girls team, the Demons, with Jones as the centerpiece. By the time she was a junior, the Demons won the under-18 state tournament and advanced as far as the national AAU finals. The following year, Jones averaged 30 points a game and lead the team to the national tournament again.

== College ==
Jones was highly recruited around the country. As a high school star in Piscataway, the home of Rutgers University, it was natural that Rutgers would be interested in persuading Jones to join their team. Recruiting of top athletes is a multi-year process, often starting before players enter high school. When Jones was a freshman at Piscataway, the Rutgers head coach was Theresa Grentz, a highly regarded coach who had served as the Olympic Coach in 1992. However, Grentz moved to Illinois in 1995, and future Basketball Hall of Fame coach C. Vivian Stringer became the head coach of Rutgers. Although Rutgers continued to pursue Jones, along with many other schools, Jones decided she would prefer to play somewhere other than home. Jones accepted a scholarship offer from Connecticut, and became one of a highly heralded recruiting class, including Sue Bird, Tamika Williams, Swin Cash, and Keirsten Walters.

While at UConn she played in every game since her sophomore season (144) breaking the UConn record for all-time games played (138) by Carla Berube (since broken by Ashley Battle), and helped lead her team, known as the Huskies, to two NCAA Women's Division I Basketball Championships in 2000 and 2002.

In the Big East Championship title game in 2002, the UConn team came to the game having won its first 32 games of the season. The opponent, Boston College, had a record of 23–6, and was ranked 17th in the nation. The game was never close. UConn scored four seconds into the game, hit their first six shots and ten of their first eleven. The final margin of victory was 42 points, breaking the tournament record of 36. The Tournament MVP honors were awarded to Jones, who scored 19 points and had 11 rebounds.

That year, the UConn team would finish the season undefeated. The team was dominant enough to prompt Sports Illustrated to call UConn "one of the best in history" before the final game of the season was played. Although the national championship game was against Oklahoma, the semi-final was against long-time rival Tennessee. SI's Richard Deitsch called Jones "the best player on the floor against Tennessee".

Sports Illustrated did a series of thirteen photographs featuring players and team member of teams chasing or achieving perfect seasons—an entire season without a loss. The photograph of the 2002 team including Asjha Jones is one of the photos in the collection.

== Professional career ==
=== International ===
In the 2005–06 off-season she played in Novosibirsk for the Russian Basketball Federation Superleague. After playing for UMMC Ekaterinburg in Russia during several years, she joined Rivas Ecópolis in the 2011–12 off-season, where she played the Final game of the EuroLeague Women 2011–12.

=== WNBA ===
Jones was selected in the first round (4th overall pick) by the Washington Mystics in the 2002 WNBA draft. The third pick by the Mystics was Stacey Dales, who said about Jones, ""Ashja Jones is one of the toughest players I've ever come up against," Dales-Schuman said. "Her physical nature, her stature, her mentality of the game, she's an exceptional player, and I see her as being a tremendous professional athlete."

After spending two seasons with the Mystics, Jones was traded to the Connecticut Sun in a three-team deal that sent Tamicha Jackson from the Phoenix Mercury to the Washington Mystics and the Sun sent the 8th pick in the 2004 WNBA draft to the Mercury.

In 2009, Jones was the leading scorer for the Sun team, with 16.7 points per game. Unfortunately, she strained her left Achilles tendon, and had to miss the final eleven games of the season. She underwent surgery in the following February. She didn't fully recover during the 2010 season, but still managed to average double-digit scoring. Jones decided to take a break, and decided not to play in the European league during the winter. The break helped her heal for the 2011 season, where she is the third leading scorer at just over 13 points per game. Her coach, Mike Thibault, says "I want a championship for Asjha as much as I want it for anybody...She's one of my favorite players I've ever coached, because of the way she approaches her job every single day."

On May 13, 2015, the Connecticut Sun traded Jones to the Minnesota Lynx in exchange for a second round pick in the 2016 WNBA draft. When the Lynx won the 2015 WNBA title, Jones became one of 11 women to receive an Olympic gold medal, an NCAA Championship, and a WNBA Championship. The others are Ruth Riley, Sheryl Swoopes, Cynthia Cooper-Dyke, Tamika Catchings, and fellow Huskies Swin Cash, Kara Wolters, Sue Bird, Diana Taurasi, and Maya Moore.

In 2018, Jones was hired as a player development coach by the Washington Mystics, and was part of the staff on the 2019 championship team. On December 3, 2019, Jones was promoted to assistant coach for the Mystics.

=== NBA ===
On April 25, 2021, it was announced that Jones would join the Portland Trail Blazers as their Director of Basketball Strategy and Planning, a front office position.

== WNBA career statistics ==
Legend
GP	Games played	GS	Games started	MPG	Minutes per game	RPG	Rebounds per game
APG	Assists per game	SPG	Steals per game	BPG	Blocks per game	PPG	Points per game
TO	Turnovers per game	FG%	Field-goal percentage	3P%	3-point field-goal percentage	FT%	Free-throw percentage
**Bold**	Career best	°	League leader

†	Denotes seasons in which Jones won a WNBA championship

=== Regular season ===
Year	Team	GP	GS	MPG	FG%	3P%	FT%	RPG	APG	SPG	BPG	TO	PPG
2002	Washington	32	5	19.1	.399	.200	.606	2.8	0.9	0.4	0.5	1.2	6.5
2003	Washington	**34**	10	22.0	.434	**.412**	.745	4.0	1.5	0.5	0.7	1.9	8.5
2004	Connecticut	**34**	1	20.6	.402	.333	.854	3.5	1.1	0.6	0.5	1.6	6.9
2005	Connecticut	33	4	21.4	**.484**	.400	.589	3.7	1.2	0.3	0.2	1.5	9.1
2006	Connecticut	**34**	2	22.9	.464	.263	.785	5.4	1.4	0.7	0.6	1.8	11.1
2007	Connecticut	30	30	31.4	.449	.083	.766	6.1	**2.5**	0.8	**0.8**	3.0	15.3
2008	Connecticut	33	33	29.2	**.484**	.217	.791	6.1	**2.5**	0.6	**0.8**	2.2	**17.0**
2009	Connecticut	23	23	**31.6**	.469	.313	.763	5.9	2.4	0.9	0.6	2.1	16.7
2010	Connecticut	30	29	25.8	.448	.300	.848	4.9	2.2	0.4	0.4	1.8	10.8
2011	Connecticut	**34**	**34**	28.6	.444	.300	.711	6.4	1.9	0.6	0.5	1.9	13.3
2012	Connecticut	20	19	27.9	.445	.333	**.897**	**7.1**	2.0	**1.0**	0.6	2.6	12.2
2015^{†}	Minnesota	31	12	17.5	.411	.000	.600	2.8	1.6	0.5	0.5	1.1	5.5
Career	12 years, 3 teams	368	202	24.5	.449	.273	.756	4.8	1.7	0.6	0.6	1.9	10.9

=== Playoffs ===
Year	Team	GP	GS	MPG	FG%	3P%	FT%	RPG	APG	SPG	BPG	TO	PPG
2002	Washington	5	0	12.6	.421	.500	.500	1.6	0.6	0.0	0.2	0.2	3.6
2004	Connecticut	**8**	0	21.4	.491	.000	.636	2.6	1.4	0.6	0.1	2.3	7.4
2005	Connecticut	**8**	0	22.3	.483	.000	.565	3.5	0.9	0.3	0.5	1.4	8.9
2006	Connecticut	5	0	22.6	.275	.000	.438	4.4	2.0	0.6	0.6	1.6	7.0
2007	Connecticut	3	3	**38.7**	.500	**1.000**	.667	8.0	**3.3**	1.0	0.7	1.7	**15.7**
2008	Connecticut	3	3	32.7	.362	.000	**.917**	**7.3**	1.3	0.7	0.3	2.3	15.0
2011	Connecticut	2	2	32.0	.366	.000	.500	6.5	2.5	**1.5**	**1.5**	2.5	15.5
2012	Connecticut	5	**5**	28.6	**.526**	.500	.778	6.4	2.6	0.6	0.2	2.0	13.6
2015^{†}	Minnesota	4	0	2.0	.000	.000	.000	0.3	0.3	0.0	0.0	0.3	0.0
Career	9 years, 3 teams	43	13	22.2	.432	.273	.628	4.0	1.5	0.5	0.4	1.5	8.7

== USA Basketball ==
Jones was invited to the USA Basketball Women's National Team training camp in the fall of 2009. The team selected to play for the 2010 FIBA World Championship and the 2012 Olympics is usually chosen from these participants. At the conclusion of the training camp, the team will travel to Ekaterinburg, Russia, where they compete in the 2009 UMMC Ekaterinburg International Invitational.

Jones was initially selected as one of the twenty players in the national team pool, from which the twelve members of the USA National team would be selected. Jones had to do something she had never done in her life—try out for a team. She chuckled as she explained, "None of us have ever had to try out for a basketball team in our life...It's a new experience having to try out and worry if they like you." She made the team, and played in the 2010 World Championships in the Czech Republic. The team was coached by Geno Auriemma who was Jones' college coach. The team was dominant, winning all nine games with an average margin of victory over 35 points. Jones averaged just over five points per games, on 57.9% shooting from the field.

Jones was one of 21 finalists for the 2012 U.S. Women's Olympic Basketball Team Roster. The 20 professional women's basketball players, plus one collegiate player (Brittney Griner), were selected by the USA Basketball Women's National Team Player Selection Committee to compete for the final roster which will represent the US at the 2012 Olympics in London. On April 23, 2012 Jones was the final member of the 12-player USA team to be selected. She was part of the US team that won the gold medal.

== Awards and honors ==
- 1998 WBCA All-American.
- 2002 AP Third Team All-American
- Selected to 2002 NCAA Final Four and Mideast Region All-Tournament Teams
- 2002 Big East women's basketball tournament Most Outstanding Player
- Member of 2002 All-BIG East First Team Selection
- 2001 Big East Tournament All Tournament Team
- Selected to 2000 NCAA Final Four All-Tournament Team
- 1999 BIG East All-Tournament Team
- 1999 All-BIG East Rookie Team
- 2009 WNBA All-Star Selection
- EuroLeague Women Final Eight 2012 MVP

== College statistics ==
Asjha Jones Statistics at University of Connecticut
Year	G	FG	FGA	PCT	3FG	3FGA	PCT	FT	FTA	PCT	REB	AVG	A	TO	B	S	MIN	PTS	AVG
1998–99	34	140	284	0.493	0	0	0.000	52	73	0.712	170	5.0	45	74	25	26	681	332	9.8
1999-00	36	127	251	0.506	5	10	0.500	60	95	0.632	177	4.9	33	61	27	20	632	319	8.9
2000–01	35	128	291	0.44	4	16	0.250	44	73	0.603	190	5.4	50	55	38	32	683	304	8.7
2001–02	39	247	445	0.555	8	25	0.320	45	75	0.600	257	6.6	66	63	61	41	961	547	14.0
Totals	144	642	1271	0.505	17	51	0.333	201	316	0.636	794	5.5	194	253	151	119	2957	1502	10.4

== See also ==
- List of Connecticut women's basketball players with 1000 points
