= Tan White =

American basketball player (born 1982)

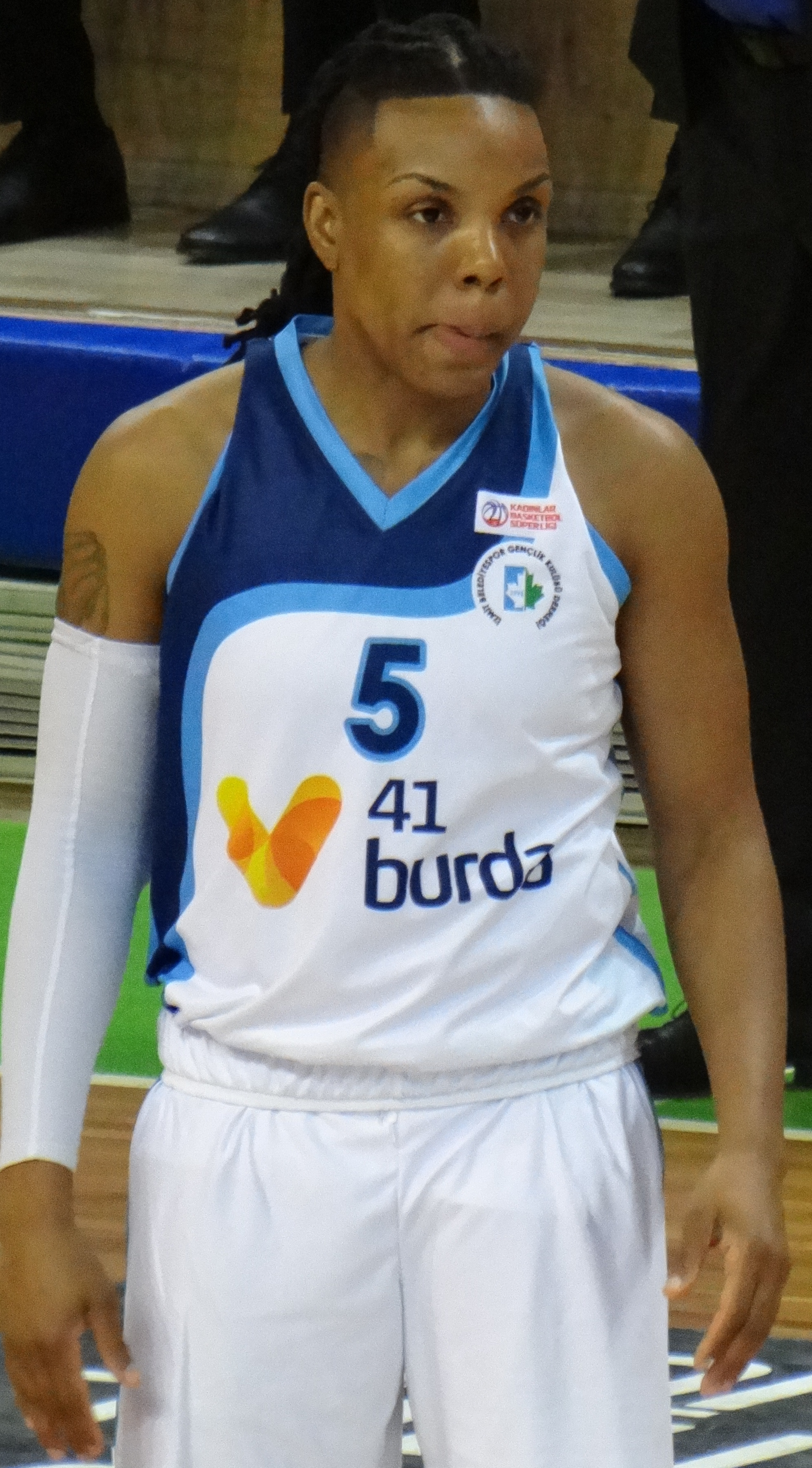

Personal information
- Born: September 27, 1982 (age 44) Tupelo, Mississippi, U.S.
- Listed height: 5 ft 7 in (1.70 m)
- Listed weight: 154 lb (70 kg)

Career information
- High school: Tupelo (Tupelo, Mississippi)
- College: Mississippi State (2001–2005)
- WNBA draft: 2005: 1st round, 2nd overall pick
- Drafted by: Indiana Fever
- Playing career: 2005–present
- Position: Shooting guard / small forward

Career history
- 2005–2008: Indiana Fever
- 2005–2006: Fenerbahçe
- 2008–2009: Elitzur Ramla
- 2009–2013: Connecticut Sun
- 2014: Minnesota Lynx

Career highlights
- WNBA All-Rookie Team (2005); Frances Pomeroy Naismith Award (2005); Kodak All-American (2005); Second-team All-American – AP (2005); 4× First-team All-SEC (2002–2005); SEC All-Freshman Team (2002); NCAA season scoring leader (2005)
- Stats at WNBA.com
- Stats at Basketball Reference

LaTanya Chantella White (born September 27, 1982) is an American professional basketball player. Born in Tupelo, Mississippi, White is 5 ft 7 in (1.70 m) tall and weighs 154 pounds (70 kg). She received the Frances Pomeroy Naismith Award from the Women's Basketball Coaches Association as the best senior player under 5 ft 8 in (1.73 m) in 2005.

== Mississippi State statistics ==
Legend
| GP | Games played | GS | Games started | MPG | Minutes per game | FG% | Field goal percentage | 3P% | 3-point field goal percentage |
| FT% | Free throw percentage | RPG | Rebounds per game | APG | Assists per game | SPG | Steals per game | BPG | Blocks per game |
| TO | Turnovers per game | PPG | Points per game | **Bold** | Career high | * | Led Division I |

| Year | Team | GP | Points | FG% | 3P% | FT% | RPG | APG | SPG | BPG | PPG |
|---|---|---|---|---|---|---|---|---|---|---|---|
| 2001-02 | Mississippi State | 31 | 575 | **42.6** | **35.3** | 62.4 | 7.2 | **4.3** | 2.9 | 0.9 | 18.5 |
| 2002-03 | Mississippi State | **32** | 580 | 43.1 | 30.7 | 73.6 | 6.8 | 3.9 | **3.3** | 1.0 | 18.1 |
| 2003-04 | Mississippi State | 29 | 585 | 41.6 | 26.7 | **81.6** | 6.3 | 3.4 | 3.1 | 0.9 | 20.2 |
| 2004-05 | Mississippi State | 29 | **681** | **42.6** | 32.1 | 75.0 | **7.7** | 3.4 | 3.0 | 1.0 | ***23.5** |
| Career | Mississippi State | 121 | 2421 | 42.5 | 31.1 | 74.1 | 7.0 | 3.8 | 3.1 | 1.0 | 20.0 |

== WNBA career ==
White was selected by the Indiana Fever in the first round (2nd pick overall) of the 2005 WNBA draft. White was waived by the Fever before the 2009 WNBA season began. Three weeks into the season, she was signed by the Connecticut Sun. She was signed by the Minnesota Lynx prior to the 2014 season.

== WNBA career statistics ==
Legend
| GP | Games played | GS | Games started | MPG | Minutes per game | RPG | Rebounds per game |
| APG | Assists per game | SPG | Steals per game | BPG | Blocks per game | PPG | Points per game |
| TO | Turnovers per game | FG% | Field-goal percentage | 3P% | 3-point field-goal percentage | FT% | Free-throw percentage |
| **Bold** | Career best | ° | League leader |

=== Regular season ===
| Year | Team | GP | GS | MPG | FG% | 3P% | FT% | RPG | APG | SPG | BPG | TO | PPG |
|---|---|---|---|---|---|---|---|---|---|---|---|---|---|
| 2005 | Indiana | **34** | 3 | 20.4 | .335 | .309 | .810 | 1.6 | 1.6 | 0.9 | 0.2 | 2.1 | 7.1 |
| 2006 | Indiana | **34** | 0 | 21.6 | .372 | .216 | .750 | 2.4 | 1.5 | 0.8 | 0.3 | 1.5 | 8.9 |
| 2007 | Indiana | **34** | 9 | 24.7 | .386 | .339 | .841 | 2.6 | 1.9 | 1.1 | 0.3 | 2.9 | **10.8** |
| 2008 | Indiana | 33 | **22** | **27.1** | .366 | .325 | **.850** | **3.1** | **2.4** | 1.3 | **0.4** | 2.6 | 9.9 |
| 2009 | Connecticut | 30 | 15 | 22.0 | .393 | .377 | .840 | 2.7 | 2.2 | 1.2 | 0.3 | 1.2 | 9.5 |
| 2010 | Connecticut | **34** | 10 | 25.2 | **.420** | .366 | .800 | 2.7 | 2.3 | **1.6** | 0.1 | 1.6 | 10.1 |
| 2011 | Connecticut | **34** | 0 | 22.0 | .354 | .280 | .840 | 2.9 | 1.9 | 1.2 | 0.2 | 1.2 | 5.9 |
| 2012 | Connecticut | 31 | 0 | 16.0 | .399 | **.403** | .833 | 1.6 | 1.1 | 1.0 | 0.2 | 1.2 | 5.0 |
| 2013 | Connecticut | 22 | 12 | 25.0 | .329 | .197 | .741 | 2.8 | 2.0 | 1.5 | 0.3 | 2.4 | 9.2 |
| 2014 | Minnesota | **34** | 1 | 17.8 | .400 | .333 | .739 | 1.8 | 1.1 | 0.9 | 0.1 | 0.9 | 4.9 |
| Career | 10 years, 3 teams | 320 | 72 | 22.1 | .375 | .320 | .808 | 2.4 | 1.8 | 1.1 | 0.2 | 1.7 | 8.1 |

=== Playoffs ===
| Year | Team | GP | GS | MPG | FG% | 3P% | FT% | RPG | APG | SPG | BPG | TO | PPG |
|---|---|---|---|---|---|---|---|---|---|---|---|---|---|
| 2005 | Indiana | 4 | 0 | 4.0 | .000 | .000 | .000 | 0.5 | 0.3 | 0.0 | 0.0 | 0.0 | 0.0 |
| 2006 | Indiana | 2 | 0 | 17.5 | .400 | .250 | .000 | 1.5 | 1.0 | 0.0 | 0.0 | 2.0 | 4.5 |
| 2007 | Indiana | **5** | **1** | 16.4 | .267 | .167 | .000 | 1.8 | 2.0 | 1.0 | **0.4** | 1.8 | 1.8 |
| 2008 | Indiana | 3 | 0 | 14.0 | .375 | .250 | **1.000** | 1.0 | 0.7 | 0.7 | 0.0 | 2.0 | **5.3** |
| 2011 | Connecticut | 2 | 0 | **21.5** | **1.000** | **1.000** | **1.000** | **2.5** | **3.0** | **1.5** | 0.0 | 2.0 | 4.0 |
| 2012 | Connecticut | **5** | 0 | 18.2 | .333 | .250 | **1.000** | 2.0 | 0.6 | 0.8 | 0.0 | 1.0 | 5.0 |
| 2014 | Minnesota | **5** | 0 | 10.2 | .333 | .400 | .500 | 1.2 | 0.4 | 1.0 | 0.0 | 0.2 | 3.2 |
| Career | 7 years, 3 teams | 26 | 1 | 13.8 | .323 | .294 | .813 | 1.5 | 1.0 | 0.7 | 0.1 | 1.1 | 3.2 |

== International career ==
White played Fenerbahçe Istanbul in 2005–06 season where she was a fan favorite for the club.

- 2005-2006: (Turkey) Fenerbahçe Istanbul
- 2008-2009: (Israel) Elitzur Ramla
