= Jamie Carey =

American basketball player and coach (born 1981)

Omaha Mavericks
- Title: Head coach
- League: Summit League

Personal information
- Born: March 12, 1981 (age 45) Hutchinson, Kansas, U.S.
- Listed height: 5 ft 6 in (1.68 m)

Career information
- High school: Horizon High School (Brighton, Colorado)
- College: Stanford (1999–2002); Texas (2002–2005)
- WNBA draft: 2005: 3rd round, 35th overall pick
- Drafted by: Phoenix Mercury
- Playing career: 2005–2009
- Position: Guard
- Coaching career: 2008–present

Career history

Playing
- 2005–2008: Connecticut Sun

Career highlights
- 2× First-team All-Big 12 (2004, 2005); Pac-10 Freshman of the Year (2000)
- Stats at Basketball Reference
Medals
Women's basketball
Representing the United States
Pan American Games
Silver medal – second place	2003 Santo Domingo	Team

Jamie Leigh Carey (born March 12, 1981) is an American former professional basketball player and current women's basketball coach at the University of Nebraska at Omaha. She played the point guard position for the Connecticut Sun of the Women's National Basketball Association (WNBA) from 2005 to 2008. Carey recently served as the Assistant Director of the USA National Team.

== Early life ==
Carey attended Horizon High School in Thornton, Colorado. She graduated as class valedictorian with a 4.0 GPA. She was named Colorado's Gatorade Player of the Year and a WBCA All-American. She participated in the 1999 WBCA High School All-America Game, where she scored three points.

== College career ==
In 1999, Carey attended Stanford University, where she earned the Pac-10 Conference "Freshman of the Year" honors and broke Stanford's single season record for three pointers made with 81. However, she suffered several serious ankle injuries and concussions and spent much of the season on the sidelines. She had surgery on her left ankle following the season and missed the following six months with rehab. She came back to practice in October 1999, but could not continue as continuing pain in her ankle left her sidelined shortly after the start of the season. She was forced to retire from the sport and sat out the next two seasons. She was seen on her crutches cheering on her team on the bench and became a fan favorite. She continued to attend classes at Stanford, and was seen on campus limping on her crutches with her left ankle wrapped in a soft cast. She reportedly said her crutches were her best friends because she could not go anywhere without her crutches. A picture of her leaning on her crutches with an ice pack on her left ankle became the cover page of the Stanford women's basketball media guide in 2000, under the title "Courage".

She transferred to The University of Texas at Austin in 2002 after the school's doctors determined they could clear her from her concussions and maintain any treatment she would need. She played three seasons there after successfully petitioning for a fifth and sixth year of NCAA eligibility. During her time at Texas, the team became a national championship contender with a Final Four appearance in 2003. She was a sociology major.

== USA Basketball ==
Carey was named to the team representing the United States at the 2003 Pan American Games. The team lost the opening game to Cuba, then rebounded to win their next five games, including an OT win against Brazil. Carey led the team with 18 points in the victory against Brazil. In their game against Canada, which they won by three points 56–53, Carey hit all six of her three-point attempts, setting a United States team record. They then faced Cuba for the gold medal, falling short 75–64 to take home the silver medal. Carey scored 9.6 points per game, representing the second highest point total on the team, and led the team in assist with 16.

== Professional career ==
Carey was drafted by the Phoenix Mercury in 2005 with the 31st overall pick and played for the Connecticut Sun until her retirement in April 2009.

== Coaching ==
She was the head coach for girls basketball at Legacy High School in Broomfield, Colorado from 2008–2010. She was the head coach for Sand Creek High School girls basketball team in Colorado Springs, Colorado from 2011–2014. She joined Linda Lappe's staff as an assistant at Colorado for the 2014–15 season. She left at the conclusion of the 2015–16 season. She then returned to her the University of Texas to become an assistant coach for her first two years starting the 2016–17. She remained there and was advanced to associate head coach her final two years until the completion of 2019–20 season. For the 2020–21 season she was an associate head coach for North Texas. For the 2021–22 season she joined UTSA and was reunited with Karen Aston, becoming the team's associate head coach.

== Career statistics ==
Legend
GP	Games played	GS	Games started	MPG	Minutes per game	RPG	Rebounds per game
APG	Assists per game	SPG	Steals per game	BPG	Blocks per game	PPG	Points per game
TO	Turnovers per game	FG%	Field-goal percentage	3P%	3-point field-goal percentage	FT%	Free-throw percentage
**Bold**	Career best	°	League leader

=== WNBA ===
==== Regular season ====
WNBA regular season statistics
Year	Team	GP	GS	MPG	FG%	3P%	FT%	RPG	APG	SPG	BPG	TO	PPG
2005	Connecticut	15	0	5.7	36.8	30.8	—	0.4	0.5	0.1	0.0	**0.3**	1.2
2006	Connecticut	24	0	11.9	37.9	35.0	**100.0**	0.7	1.3	**0.3**	0.0	0.7	2.6
2007	Connecticut	33	0	12.7	36.6	**45.1**	75.0	0.9	0.9	0.1	0.0	0.5	3.4
2008	Connecticut	33	**3**	**15.1**	**42.3**	41.0	90.0	**1.2**	**1.4**	0.2	0.0	0.7	**4.2**
**Career**	4 years, 1 team	105	3	12.3	39.1	40.6	87.0	0.9	1.1	0.2	0.0	0.6	3.1

==== Playoffs ====
WNBA playoff statistics
Year	Team	GP	GS	MPG	FG%	3P%	FT%	RPG	APG	SPG	BPG	TO	PPG
2005	Connecticut	**6**	0	11.8	22.2	16.7	—	0.3	1.2	0.2	0.0	0.7	0.8
2006	Connecticut	5	0	5.8	**33.3**	20.0	—	0.2	0.4	0.0	0.0	0.0	1.0
2007	Connecticut	3	0	**15.7**	28.6	**33.3**	**66.7**	**0.7**	**3.0**	**0.3**	0.0	0.3	**2.7**
2008	Connecticut	1	0	2.0	—	—	—	0.0	0.0	0.0	0.0	0.0	0.0
**Career**	4 years, 1 team	15	0	9.9	27.3	23.5	66.7	0.3	1.2	0.1	0.0	0.3	1.2

=== College ===
Ratios
Year	Team	GP	FG%	3P%	FT%	RBG	APG	BPG	SPG	PPG
1999–2000	Stanford	29	41.9%	**45.5%**	76.9%	**2.17**	3.03	-	1.38	11.00
2000–01	Stanford	Redshirt due to injury								
2001–02	Stanford	Redshirt due to injury								
2002–03	Texas	30	38.8%	41.6%	**80.9%**	1.40	**3.60**	0.03	0.70	10.77
2003–04	Texas	**35**	42.3%	40.7%	79.7%	1.97	2.77	**0.11**	1.37	10.66
2004–05	Texas	31	**42.9%**	42.9%	79.2%	1.81	2.52	0.10	**1.58**	**12.19**
**Career**		125	41.6%	42.8%	79.6%	1.84	2.97	0.06	1.26	11.14

Totals
Year	Team	GP	FG	FGA	3P	3PA	FT	FTA	REB	A	BK	ST	PTS
1999–2000	Stanford	29	104	248	**81**	**178**	30	39	63	88	-	40	319
2000–01	Stanford	Redshirt due to injury											
2001-02	Stanford	Redshirt due to injury											
2002–03	Texas	30	95	245	57	137	**76**	**94**	42	**108**	1	21	323
2003–04	Texas	**35**	126	298	66	162	55	69	**69**	97	**4**	**48**	373
2004–05	Texas	31	**133**	**310**	70	163	42	53	56	78	3	49	**378**
**Career**		125	458	1101	274	640	203	255	230	371	8	158	1393

== Head coaching record ==
Record table
Season	Coach	Overall	Conference	Standing	Postseason
Omaha (Summit League) (2025–present)
2025–26	Omaha	6–27	3–13	T–8th	
Omaha:		6–27 (.182)	3–13 (.188)		
Total:		6–27 (.182)			
National champion Postseason invitational champion Conference regular season champion Conference regular season and conference tournament champion Division regular season champion Division regular season and conference tournament champion Conference tournament champion
