= Amber Holt =

American basketball player (born 1985)

Free agent
- Position: Guard / forward

Personal information
- Born: June 7, 1985 (age 41) Norcross, Georgia, U.S.
- Listed height: 6 ft 0 in (1.83 m)
- Listed weight: 170 lb (77 kg)

Career information
- High school: Meadowcreek (Norcross, Georgia)
- College: Southeastern Illinois (2004–2006); Middle Tennessee (2006–2008)
- WNBA draft: 2008: 1st round, 9th overall pick
- Drafted by: Connecticut Sun

Career history
- 2008–2009: Connecticut Sun
- 2010–2012: Tulsa Shock

Career highlights
- WNBA All-Rookie Team (2008); Third-team All-American – AP (2008); All-American – USBWA (2008); Sun Belt Defensive Player of the Year (2008); 2× First-team All-Sun Belt (2007, 2008)
- Stats at WNBA.com
- Stats at Basketball Reference

Amber Shirell Holt (born June 7, 1985) is an American professional women's basketball player most recently with the Tulsa Shock in the Women's National Basketball Association (WNBA).

== Early life ==
Holt was born in Norcross, Georgia. She is the daughter of Cassandra Holt. Holt is joined by her two brothers, Cortez and DeMarkus Dennis.

== High school career ==
Holt attended Meadowcreek High School in Norcross, Georgia. Holt averaged 19.1 points, 7.0 rebounds and 4.5 assists as a senior while leading the Lady Mustangs to a 20–7 record. Holt was a first-team All-State performer as a junior when she led Meadowcreek to a 24–6 record and a runner-up finish in the 2002 Class AAAAA State Tournament.

== College career ==
Holt went to Southeastern Illinois College. As a freshman, Holt was named second-team All-America by the NJCAA after averaging 20.3 points, 10.9 rebounds and 3.6 steals for SIC ... Among national leaders, she finished the season ranked No. 9 in both scoring and rebounding, as well as No. 10 in steals, No. 46 in free throw percentage (.775) and No. 50 in field goal percentage (.539) ... As a sophomore, Holt was a Kodak All-American and a first-team All-America pick by the NJCAA ... Averaged 20.2 points, 9.5 rebounds, 4.9 assists and 4.0 steals while leading Southern Illinois to a 33–3 record and a fifth-place finish at the NJCAA Tournament. Nationally, she ranked No. 15 in scoring, No. 30 in rebounding, No. 12 in steals, and No. 40 in assists.

Holt transferred to Middle Tennessee State University. As a senior during the 2007–2008 season, she was the top scoring player in Division I.

== Career statistics ==
Legend
GP	Games played	GS	Games started	MPG	Minutes per game	RPG	Rebounds per game
APG	Assists per game	SPG	Steals per game	BPG	Blocks per game	PPG	Points per game
TO	Turnovers per game	FG%	Field-goal percentage	3P%	3-point field-goal percentage	FT%	Free-throw percentage
**Bold**	Career best	°	League leader

=== WNBA ===
==== Regular season ====
Year	Team	GP	GS	MPG	FG%	3P%	FT%	RPG	APG	SPG	BPG	TO	PPG
2008	Connecticut	34	34	21.0	40.7	32.9	77.8	3.1	1.9	0.4	0.1	0.9	6.5
2009	Connecticut	23	7	16.5	32.5	26.0	83.0	3.2	1.9	0.4	0.1	0.6	6.0
2010	Tulsa	33	9	21.1	40.8	31.4	80.2	3.1	1.8	0.9	0.2	1.1	8.7
2011	Tulsa	26	24	25.6	30.2	21.4	90.5	3.1	2.4	0.7	0.1	1.3	6.7
2012	Tulsa	24	18	19.0	42.5	34.7	56.3	1.9	1.2	0.5	0.0	0.7	5.8
Career	5 years, 2 teams	140	92	20.8	37.5	29.3	80.6	2.9	1.8	0.6	0.1	0.9	6.9

==== Playoffs ====
Year	Team	GP	GS	MPG	FG%	3P%	FT%	RPG	APG	SPG	BPG	TO	PPG
2008	Connecticut	3	1	18.3	18.8	16.7	100.0	4.0	1.3	0.3	0.0	0.7	3.7
Career	1 year, 1 teams	3	1	18.3	18.8	16.7	100.0	4.0	1.3	0.3	0.0	0.7	3.7

=== College ===
Legend
GP	Games played	GS	Games started	MPG	Minutes per game	FG%	Field goal percentage	3P%	3-point field goal percentage
FT%	Free throw percentage	RPG	Rebounds per game	APG	Assists per game	SPG	Steals per game	BPG	Blocks per game
TO	Turnovers per game	PPG	Points per game	**Bold**	Career high	*	Led Division I

Year	Team	GP	Points	FG%	3P%	FT%	RPG	APG	SPG	BPG	PPG
2006–07	Middle Tennessee	**34**	567	.465	**.294**	.769	6.3	1.9	**2.7**	**0.4**	16.7
2007–08	Middle Tennessee	**34**	**930**	**.518**	.278	**.789**	**8.1**	**3.2**	2.4	0.3	***27.4**
Career		68	1,497	.497	.285	.781	7.2	2.5	2.5	0.4	22.0

== WNBA career ==
In the 2008 WNBA draft, Holt was picked by the Connecticut Sun in the first round, 9th overall.

== WUBA Career ==
In 2020 Holt played with the Southern Lady Generals winning the Eurobasket.com player of the year award leading them to the WUBA Championship.

== Overseas career ==
She played with Sopron in Hungary during the 2008–09 WNBA off-season.

== See also ==
- List of NCAA Division I women's basketball season scoring leaders
