= Barbara Turner (basketball) =

American basketball player (born 1984)

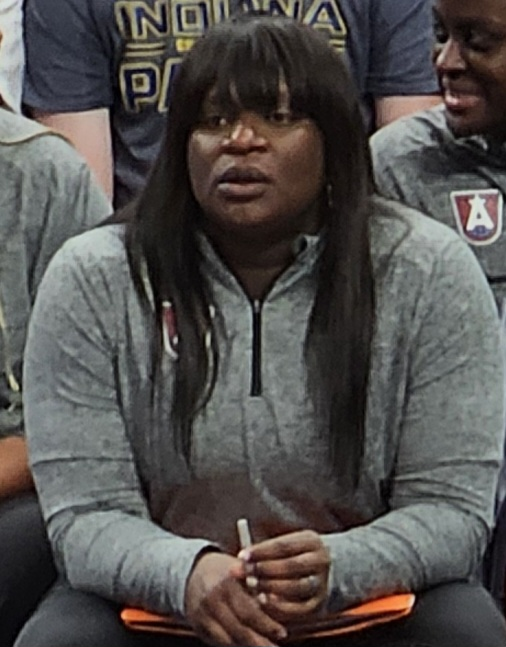
- Turner in 2024 coaching for the Atlanta Dream

Washington Mystics
- Title: Assistant coach
- League: WNBA

Personal information
- Born: June 8, 1984 (age 42) Cleveland, Ohio, U.S.
- Listed height: 6 ft 0 in (1.83 m)
- Listed weight: 183 lb (83 kg)

Career information
- High school: East Technical (Cleveland, Ohio)
- College: UConn (2002–2006)
- WNBA draft: 2006: 1st round, 11th overall pick
- Drafted by: Seattle Storm
- Playing career: 2006–2021
- Position: Shooting guard / small forward
- Coaching career: 2021–present

Career history

Playing
- 2006: Seattle Storm
- 2006: A.S. Ramat-Hasharon
- 2007: Fenerbahçe
- 2007: Houston Comets
- 2007–2008: ŽKK Šibenik
- 2008: Connecticut Sun
- 2008–2009: Tarsus Belediyespor
- 2009–2010: Mersin BB
- 2010–2012: Kayseri Kaski
- 2012–2013: Mersin BB
- 2013–2014: Botaş
- 2014: Galatasaray
- 2014–2015: Orduspor
- 2015–2018: Hatay BB
- 2018: Bendigo Spirit
- 2019–2021: Çankaya Üniversitesi

Coaching
- 2021: Houston Rockets (assistant)
- 2022–2024: Atlanta Dream (assistant)
- 2024–2025: South Bay Lakers (assistant)
- 2025–present: Washington Mystics (assistant)

Career highlights
- 2× NCAA champion (2003, 2004); Big East Tournament MOP (2005); Big East All-Freshman Team (2003); McDonald's All-American (2002); Gatorade Ohio Player of the Year (2002); Ms. Ohio Basketball (2002)
- Stats at Basketball Reference
Medals
Women's basketball
Representing United States
Pan American
Silver medal – second place	2003 Santo Domingo	Team

Barbara Renee Turner (born June 8, 1984) is an American former professional basketball player currently working as an assistant coach for the Washington Mystics of the Women's National Basketball Association (WNBA). She acquired US / Turkish dual citizenship while playing in Turkey; her name in Turkish is spelled Bahar Öztürk.

== High school ==
Born and raised in Cleveland, Ohio, Turner played for East Technical High School in Cleveland, where she was named a WBCA All-American. She participated in the 2002 WBCA High School All-America Game where she scored thirteen points.

== College ==
In her last NCAA Tournament run, Barbara Turner was unable to get her Connecticut team back to the pinnacle of women's college basketball after helping UConn win NCAA Championships in 2003 and 2004. The Huskies' 2006 Final Four bid fell short in overtime against Duke in the Elite Eight, with Turner unable to play down the stretch because of debilitating cramps.

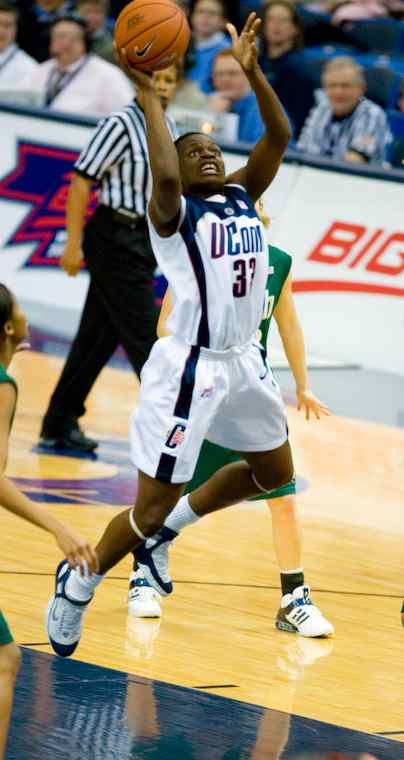
Turner in 2006 playing for the Huskies

== USA Basketball ==
Turner was named to the team representing the US at the 2003 Pan American Games. The team lost the opening game to Cuba, then rebounded to win their next five games, including an overtime win against Brazil. They then faced Cuba for the gold medal, falling short 75–64 to take home the silver medal. Turner averaged 5.4 points per game.

== College highlights ==
- 2003 Big East All-Rookie Team
- 2004 All-Big East Second Team
- 2005 All-Big East Honorable Mention
- 2005 Most Outstanding of Big East Tournament
- 2005 Big East All-Tournament Team

== WNBA career ==
Turner's dominant postseason—she averaged 22.8 points and 10.5 rebounds in the NCAA Tournament—secured her a spot in the first round of the 2006 WNBA draft when Turner was taken 11th overall by the Seattle Storm. She quickly made the transition from power forward to small forward in the WNBA, starting 9 games as a rookie and appearing in all 34 games during the 2006 season, averaging 6.4 points, 2.5 rebounds and 1.4 assists.

On May 16, 2007, Turner was waived by the Seattle Storm, and two weeks later she was signed by the Houston Comets. During the 2007 season, Turner played in 22 games, averaging 4.2 points and 1.9 rebounds.

On March 6, 2008, Turner was re-signed by the Comets, then traded to the Connecticut Sun in exchange for Megan Mahoney.

== European career ==
- 2006 : (Israel) A.S. Ramat-Hasharon
- 2006–2007: (Turkey) Fenerbahçe Istanbul
- 2008–2009: (Turkey) Tarsus Belediyesi
- 2009–2010: (Turkey) Mersin Büyükşehir Belediyesi
- 2010–2012: (Turkey) Kayseri Kaski S.K.
- 2012–2013: (Turkey) Mersin Büyükşehir Belediyesi
- 2013–2014: (Turkey) Botaş SK
- 2014 (Turkey) Galatasaray OdeaBank,
- 2014–2015: (Turkey) Orduspor
- 2015–2018: (Turkey) Hatay BŞB

== Coaching career ==
On September 26, 2021, Turner joined the Houston Rockets coaching staff as a player development coach.

On October 2, 2024, Turner became an assistant coach for the South Bay Lakers of the NBA G League.

On April 2, 2025, Turner was named an assistant coach for the Washington Mystics of the WNBA.

== Awards ==
- Ohio Ms. Basketball (2004) awarded by Ohio High School Basketball Coaches Association

== Career statistics ==
Legend
GP	Games played	GS	Games started	MPG	Minutes per game	RPG	Rebounds per game
APG	Assists per game	SPG	Steals per game	BPG	Blocks per game	PPG	Points per game
TO	Turnovers per game	FG%	Field-goal percentage	3P%	3-point field-goal percentage	FT%	Free-throw percentage
**Bold**	Career best	°	League leader

=== WNBA ===
==== Regular season ====
Year	Team	GP	GS	MPG	FG%	3P%	FT%	RPG	APG	SPG	BPG	TO	PPG
2006	Seattle	**34**	**9**	18.3	**44.7**	25.0	**83.1**	2.5	1.4	0.4	0.2	1.4	6.4
2007	Houston	22	2	12.0	40.3	23.3	65.9	1.9	0.9	0.4	0.2	1.0	4.2
2008	Connecticut	**34**	6	19.5	41.7	**37.3**	77.5	**3.2**	1.5	0.4	**0.4**	1.2	**8.0**
2009	Connecticut	7	0	20.6	**20.5**	16.0	80.0	2.1	**2.0**	**0.7**	0.0	**0.6**	4.0
Career	4 years, 3 teams	97	17	17.4	40.7	30.5	77.4	2.6	1.4	0.4	0.2	1.2	6.3

==== Playoffs ====
Year	Team	GP	GS	MPG	FG%	3P%	FT%	RPG	APG	SPG	BPG	TO	PPG
2006	Seattle	3	0	17.7	**33.3**	**33.3**	0.0	2.7	**1.7**	**0.3**	**0.7**	**0.0**	2.3
2008	Connecticut	3	0	**19.0**	22.7	28.6	**100.0**	**3.3**	0.3	0.0	0.3	1.0	**5.3**
Career	2 years, 2 teams	6	0	18.3	25.8	29.4	100.0	3.0	1.0	0.2	0.5	0.5	3.8

=== College ===
Barabara Turner Statistics at University of Connecticut
Year	G	FG	FGA	PCT	3FG	3FGA	PCT	FT	FTA	PCT	REB	AVG	A	TO	B	S	MIN	PTS	AVG
2002–03	38	134	269	0.489	9	30	0.300	102	149	0.685	220	5.8	45	75	18	22	795	379	10.0
2003–04	35	177	330	0.536	19	47	0.404	105	158	0.665	167	4.8	105	71	14	30	933	478	13.7
2004–05	29	126	241	0.523	5	21	0.238	63	95	0.663	140	4.8	44	55	22	24	638	320	11.0
2005–06	36	170	312	0.545	12	40	0.300	100	140	0.714	270	7.5	85	63	28	35	973	452	12.6
Totals	138	607	1152	0.527	45	138	0.326	370	542	0.683	797	5.8	279	264	82	111	3339	1629	11.8

== See also ==
- Connecticut Huskies women's basketball
- List of Connecticut women's basketball players with 1000 points
- 2003–04 Connecticut Huskies women's basketball team
