= Tamika Williams-Jeter =

American basketball player and coach (born 1980)

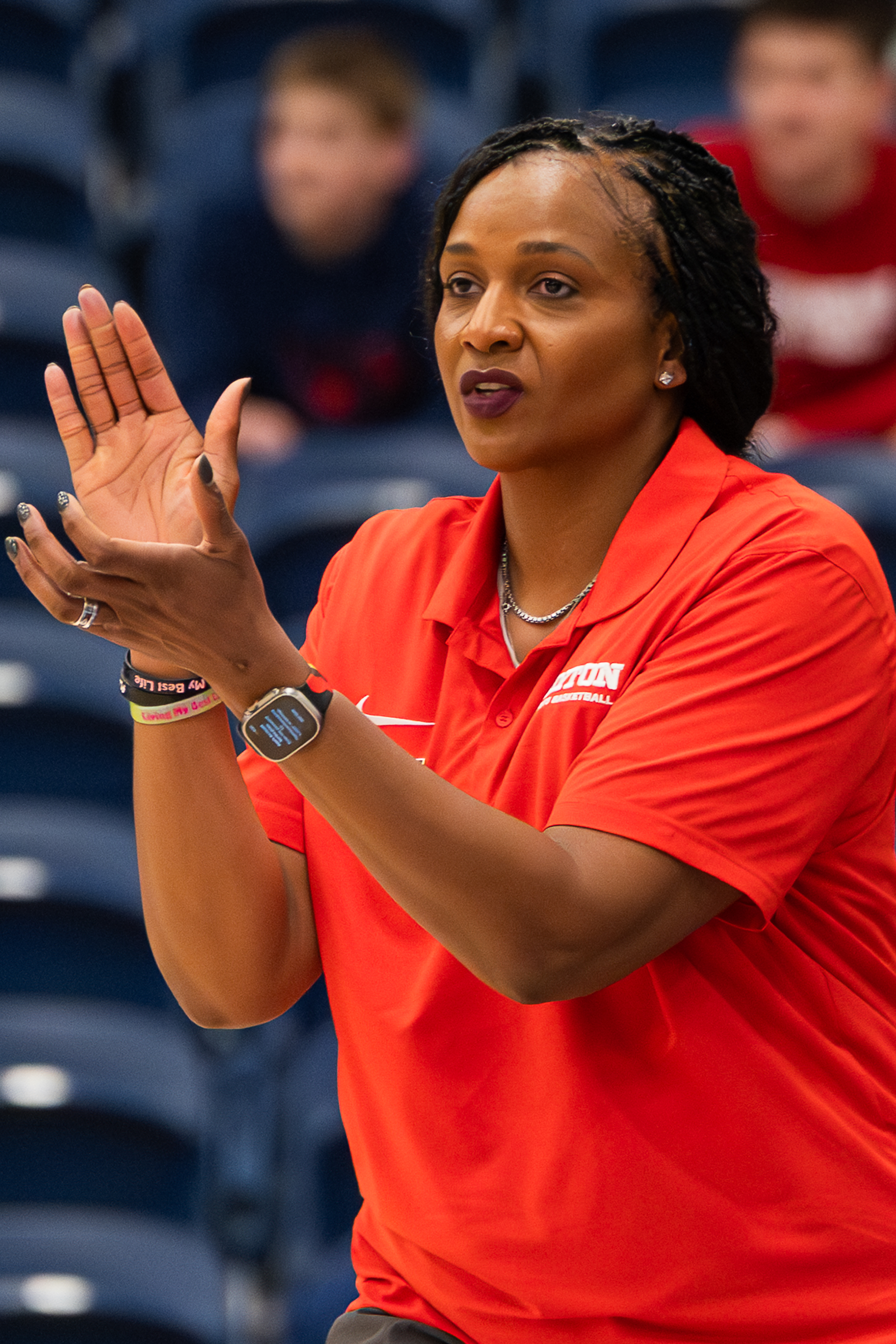
- Williams-Jeter with Dayton Flyers at the 2026 Atlantic 10 Tournament

Dayton Flyers
- Title: Head coach
- League: Atlantic 10

Personal information
- Born: April 12, 1980 (age 46) Dayton, Ohio, U.S.
- Listed height: 6 ft 2 in (1.88 m)
- Listed weight: 195 lb (88 kg)

Career information
- High school: Chaminade-Julienne (Dayton, Ohio)
- College: UConn (1998–2002)
- WNBA draft: 2002: 1st round, 6th overall pick
- Drafted by: Minnesota Lynx
- Playing career: 2002–2008
- Position: Forward
- Number: 20
- Coaching career: 2002–present

Career history

Playing
- 2002–2007: Minnesota Lynx
- 2008: Connecticut Sun

Coaching
- 2002–2008: Ohio State (GA/assistant)
- 2008–2011: Kansas (assistant)
- 2014–2016: Kentucky (assistant)
- 2016–2019: Penn State (assistant)
- 2019–2021: Ohio State (assistant)
- 2021–2022: Wittenberg
- 2022–present: Dayton

Career highlights
- NCAA champion (2000, 2002); Dawn Staley Community Leadership Award (2009); Big East Tournament MOP (2000); Big East Freshman of the Year (1999); Big East All-Freshman Team (1999); Naismith Prep Player of the Year (1998); Gatorade National Player of the Year (1998)
- Stats at Basketball Reference

Tamika Williams-Jeter (born Tamika Maria Williams; April 12, 1980) is the head women's basketball coach at the University of Dayton. She was a professional basketball player for the Minnesota Lynx and the Connecticut Sun in the WNBA.

== Early life and education ==
Born in Dayton, Ohio, Williams-Jeter started playing organized basketball at age 10 in the Dayton Lady Hoopstars AAU program, played on Lady Hoopstar teams which won one national AAU age group championship and finished in top four twice.

Williams-Jeter had a stellar basketball career at Chaminade-Julienne, a Catholic high school in Dayton, Ohio. She was named the 1997 and 1998 Ohio Player of the Year and was named in the 1997-98 Associated Press girls Division I All-Ohio high school basketball team. She was named "Ohio's Miss Basketball" by the Associated Press and chosen by a statewide media panel. Williams-Jeter was also named a WBCA All-American and the WBCA high school player of the year. Williams-Jeter participated in the WBCA High School All-America Game, where she scored eight points.

After graduating from Chaminade-Julienne, Williams-Jeter was heavily recruited by numerous collegiate teams. In 1997, she was the subject of a seven-page feature in a January 1998 issue of a Sports Illustrated magazine article on the pressures of being recruited. Ohio State arranged for a private jet to fly Williams-Jeter from her home in Dayton to Columbus, approximately 70 miles away. She mentioned this to UConn coach Geno Auriemma, who responded by mailing her a little wooden plane, explaining, "Sorry, Tamika. This is the best we can do."

== College career ==
Williams-Jeter attended the University of Connecticut, majored in interpersonal communications, and served as President of UConn's Student-Athlete Advisory Committee. From 1998 to 2002 she was part of the UConn basketball team, which became NCAA Division I National Championship teams in 2000 and 2002 under coach Geno Auriemma.

She completed her four-year collegiate career in 2002 with averages of 10.6 points per game and 5.8 rebounds per game. She finished as UConn's all-time leader in field goal percentage at 70.3% (560-for-797), which is also an NCAA Division 1 record. She also holds the Huskies' top four single-season marks for field goal percentage, ranked 14th on UConn's all-time scoring list with 1,402 points, and finished 10th all-time in rebounding (763). She was one of four players (along with Asjha Jones, Swin Cash, and Sue Bird) called by Sports Illustrated "best recruiting class of 1998".

In recent years, she has been spending the WNBA off-season working on getting a master's degree in sports management at Ohio State University.

== Professional career ==
During the 2002 WNBA draft, the Minnesota Lynx selected Williams-Jeter in the first round, sixth overall. In 2003, she set a WNBA single-season record for field-goal accuracy, with a percentage of 66.8%.

On March 14, 2008, Williams-Jeter was traded to the Connecticut Sun in exchange for Kristen Rasmussen.

== Coaching career ==
Williams-Jeter served as an assistant coach at the University of Kansas for their women's basketball team.

Williams-Jeter served as the head coach for the Senior National team of India at the Asian Games held in Guangzhou (China). The games were played in November 2010.

Williams-Jeter joined Matthew Mitchell's Kentucky staff as an assistant coach in August 2014.

=== Wittenberg ===
In May 2021, Williams-Jeter became head basketball coach at Wittenberg University. In her first year as the head coach of the Tigers, Wittenberg knocked out #10 DePaw out of the NCAC Tournament on February 25, 2022, advancing to the title game.

=== Dayton ===
On March 26, 2022, Williams-Jeter was announced as the head coach of the University of Dayton Flyers.

== Career statistics ==
=== WNBA ===
Legend
GP	Games played	GS	Games started	MPG	Minutes per game	RPG	Rebounds per game
APG	Assists per game	SPG	Steals per game	BPG	Blocks per game	PPG	Points per game
TO	Turnovers per game	FG%	Field-goal percentage	3P%	3-point field-goal percentage	FT%	Free-throw percentage
**Bold**	Career best	°	League leader

==== Regular season ====
WNBA regular season statistics
Year	Team	GP	GS	MPG	FG%	3P%	FT%	RPG	APG	SPG	BPG	TO	PPG
2002	Minnesota	31	31	**33.0**	.561	**.273**	.583	**7.4**	**1.6**	**1.4**	**0.4**	2.4	**10.1**
2003	Minnesota	**34**	**34**	**33.0**	**.668**	.000	.484	6.1	1.3	1.0	0.3	1.7	8.9
2004	Minnesota	**34**	33	28.8	.540	.250	.563	6.0	1.1	1.1	0.1	1.9	7.5
2005	Minnesota	**34**	9	22.3	.551	.000	.543	5.0	1.1	0.9	0.1	1.2	5.8
2006	Minnesota	31	30	21.6	.442	.111	.444	5.6	0.7	0.5	0.0	1.2	4.7
2007	Minnesota	21	2	7.1	.600	.000	**.636**	1.9	0.3	0.1	0.0	0.4	1.5
2008	Connecticut	**34**	1	11.0	.417	.000	.585	2.9	0.4	0.3	0.0	0.8	2.5
**Career**	7 years, 2 teams	219	140	23.2	.549	.161	.543	5.1	1.0	0.8	0.1	1.4	6.1

==== Playoffs ====
WNBA playoff statistics
Year	Team	GP	GS	MPG	FG%	3P%	FT%	RPG	APG	SPG	BPG	TO	PPG
2003	Minnesota	**3**	**3**	38.7	.607	.000	.667	7.3	1.0	**2.3**	**0.3**	1.3	**16.7**
2004	Minnesota	2	2	36.0	**.625**	.000	**1.000**	**8.5**	**3.0**	0.5	0.0	0.5	12.0
2008	Connecticut	**3**	0	9.3	.500	.000	.000	2.3	0.3	0.3	**0.3**	0.3	1.3
**Career**	3 years, 2 teams	8	5	27.0	.604	.000	.714	5.8	1.3	1.1	0.3	0.8	9.8

=== College ===
*	Denotes season(s) in which Williams-Jeter won an NCAA Championship

Tamika Williams Statistics at University of Connecticut
Year	G	FG	FGA	PCT	3FG	3FGA	PCT	FT	FTA	PCT	REB	AVG	A	TO	B	S	MIN	PTS	AVG
1998-99	33	173	263	0.658	0	2	0.000	98	151	0.649	226	6.8	27	66	12	50	738	444	13.5
1999-00*	31	115	161	0.714	0	0	—	51	71	0.718	111	3.6	24	65	8	40	509	281	9.1
2000-01	33	132	174	0.759	0	1	0.000	60	97	0.619	186	5.6	25	54	7	45	656	324	9.8
2001-02*	35	140	199	0.704	0	0	—	73	112	0.652	240	6.9	44	47	16	52	766	353	10.1
Totals	132	560	797	0.703	0	3	0.000	282	431	0.654	763	5.8	120	232	43	187	2669	1402	10.6

== Head coaching record ==
Record table
Season	Team	Overall	Conference	Standing	Postseason
Wittenberg Tigers (Atlantic 10 Conference) (2021–2022)
2021–22	Wittenberg	18–8	10–4	4th	NCAA Division III First Round
Dayton:		18–8 (.692)	10–4 (.714)		
Dayton Flyers (Atlantic 10 Conference) (2022–present)
2022–23	Dayton	7–21	5–10	12th	
2023–24	Dayton	12–19	5–13	T–12th	
2024–25	Dayton	18–13	11–7	T–5th	
2025–26	Dayton	17–14	9–9	T–7th	
Dayton:		54–67 (.446)	36–46 (.439)		
Total:		72–75 (.490)			
National champion Postseason invitational champion Conference regular season champion Conference regular season and conference tournament champion Division regular season champion Division regular season and conference tournament champion Conference tournament champion

== Awards ==
- WBCA high school player of the year(1998)
- Ohio Miss Basketball (1998) awarded by Ohio High School Basketball Coaches Association
- 2008 Dawn Staley Community Leadership Award, awarded annually to a WNBA player who best exhibits the characteristics of a leader in the community.
- 2013 Inductee of the Ohio Basketball Hall of Fame
