= Lauren Ervin =

American basketball player (born 1985)

Personal information
- Born: March 24, 1985 (age 41) Inglewood, California
- Listed height: 6 ft 4 in (1.93 m)
- Listed weight: 171 lb (78 kg)

Career information
- High school: Inglewood (Inglewood, California)
- College: Kansas (2003–2004); Mt. San Antonio (2004–2005); Arkansas (2006–2008)
- WNBA draft: 2008: 3rd round, 37th overall pick
- Drafted by: Connecticut Sun
- Position: Forward
- Number: 44

Career history
- 2009: Connecticut Sun

Career highlights
- McDonald's All-American (2003)
- Stats at Basketball Reference

Lauren Rochelle Ervin (born March 24, 1985) is an American women's basketball player with Women's National Basketball Association (WNBA). She attended the University of Kansas as a freshman, then Mt. San Antonio College for her sophomore year, before transferring to the University of Arkansas for her junior and senior year. She was drafted by the Connecticut Sun in the third round of the 2008. Due to her ACL injury, she did not join the Sun until the 2009 season. She played six months in the Swedish Women's Basketball League 2008/09, before heading back to the US. She made the 11-woman opening day roster but was cut when Sandrine Gruda reported to the team in July. The Washington Mystics signed Ervin to a training camp contract in 2010.

== High school ==
Ervin played for Inglewood High School in Inglewood, California, where she was named a WBCA All-American. She participated in the 2002 WBCA High School All-America Game where she scored four points.

== Career statistics ==
=== WNBA ===
Legend
GP	Games played	GS	Games started	MPG	Minutes per game	RPG	Rebounds per game
APG	Assists per game	SPG	Steals per game	BPG	Blocks per game	PPG	Points per game
TO	Turnovers per game	FG%	Field-goal percentage	3P%	3-point field-goal percentage	FT%	Free-throw percentage
**Bold**	Career best	°	League leader

==== Regular season ====
Year	Team	GP	GS	MPG	FG%	3P%	FT%	RPG	APG	SPG	BPG	TO	PPG
2009	Connecticut	8	0	7.0	47.1	0.0	0.0	1.6	0.0	0.1	0.0	0.3	2.0
Career	1 year, 1 team	8	0	7.0	47.1	0.0	0.0	1.6	0.0	0.1	0.0	0.3	2.0

=== College ===
Legend
GP	Games played	GS	Games started	MPG	Minutes per game
FG%	Field goal percentage	3P%	3-point field goal percentage	FT%	Free throw percentage
RPG	Rebounds per game	APG	Assists per game	SPG	Steals per game
BPG	Blocks per game	PPG	Points per game	**Bold**	Career high

Year	Team	GP	Points	FG%	3P%	FT%	RPG	APG	SPG	BPG	PPG
2003-04	Kansas	24	163	51.5%	0.0%	53.2%	6.8	1.1	1.1	1.2	6.8
2004-05	Mt. San Antonio College	not available									
2005-06	Arkansas	Sat out due to NCAA transfer rules									
2006-07	Arkansas	**31**	**395**	**56.6%**	25.0%	72.9%	10.3	1.5	1.2	**2.5**	12.7
2007-08	Arkansas	16	256	53.2%	**37.1%**	**81.8%**	**11.0**	**2.7**	**1.4**	1.7	**16.0**
Career		71	814	54.4%	35.9%	70.8%	9.3	1.6	1.2	1.9	11.5
