= Tamika Whitmore =

American basketball player (born 1977)

Personal information
- Born: June 5, 1977 (age 49) Tupelo, Mississippi, U.S.
- Listed height: 6 ft 2 in (1.88 m)
- Listed weight: 215 lb (98 kg)

Career information
- High school: Tupelo (Tupelo, Mississippi)
- College: Memphis (1995–1999)
- WNBA draft: 1999: 3rd round, 30th overall pick
- Drafted by: New York Liberty
- Playing career: 1999–2009
- Position: Power forward
- Number: 44,00,91

Career history
- 1999–2003: New York Liberty
- 2004–2005: Los Angeles Sparks
- 2006–2007: Indiana Fever
- 2008–2009: Connecticut Sun

Career highlights
- WNBA All-Star (2006); Second-team All-American – AP (1999); All-American – USBWA (1999); 2× CUSA Player of the Year (1998, 1999); 3× First-team All-CUSA (1997, 1998, 1999); CUSA All-Freshman Team (1996); NCAA season scoring leader (1999)
- Stats at WNBA.com
- Stats at Basketball Reference
Medals
Women's basketball
Representing United States
Jones Cup
Gold medal – first place	1998 Taipei, Taiwan	Team competition

Tamika Whitmore (born June 5, 1977) is an American former professional basketball player who played in the WNBA.

== College years ==
Born in Tupelo, Mississippi, Whitmore played collegiate basketball while attending the University of Memphis on a scholarship. She finished second in career scoring with 2,488 points, first in career field goal percentage at 60.6%, fourth in career rebounds with 952, and second in career blocked shots with 108. She was the Conference USA player of the year in 1998 and 1999. She led the NCAAW in scoring during her senior year at University of Memphis.

Her #44 jersey was retired by the University of Memphis on March 1, 2025. She is only the sixth player in Memphis Women's Basketball history to receive such an honor.

== USA Basketball ==
In 1998, Whitmore was named to the team representing the US at the William Jones Cup competition in Taipei, Taiwan. The USA team won all five games, earning the gold medal for the competition. Whitmore was the second leading scorer on the team, averaging 9.8 points per game over the five games.

== WNBA career ==
In the 1999 WNBA draft, she was selected by the New York Liberty, for whom she played for five seasons before signing a free agent contract with the Los Angeles Sparks. She played for the Sparks during the 2004 and 2005 seasons.

Afterwards, she signed another free agent contract with the Indiana Fever for the 2006 season. In Game 2 of the Fever's semifinals matchup against the Shock, Tamika Whitmore set a WNBA record for points in a playoff game with 41, breaking Lisa Leslie's mark of 35.

On February 19, 2008, Whitmore was traded along with Indiana's 2008 first-round draft pick to the Connecticut Sun for Katie Douglas.

== International career ==
- 2001–2002: Las Palmas (Spain)
- 2003–2004: Las Palmas (Spain)
- 2004–2005: Halcón Viajes Perfumerías Avenida Salamanca (Spain)
- 2005–2006: Mourenx BC (LFB, France)
- 2006 (until December): Lotos VBW Clima Gdynia (Poland)
- 2007 (from January): Spartak Moscow Region (Russia)
- 2007–2008, 2008–2009: Gambrinus Sika Brno (Czech Republic)

== Career statistics ==
Legend
GP	Games played	GS	Games started	MPG	Minutes per game	FG%	Field goal percentage	3P%	3-point field goal percentage
FT%	Free throw percentage	RPG	Rebounds per game	APG	Assists per game	SPG	Steals per game	BPG	Blocks per game
TO	Turnovers per game	PPG	Points per game	**Bold**	Career high	*	Led Division I

=== WNBA ===
==== Regular season ====
Year	Team	GP	GS	MPG	FG%	3P%	FT%	RPG	APG	SPG	BPG	TO	PPG
1999	New York	27	1	21.2	43.5	12.5	67.9	3.6	0.7	0.6	0.2	2.1	7.9
2000	New York	32	16	21.5	43.1	0.0	70.2	3.3	0.6	0.5	0.5	1.7	8.7
2001	New York	32	29	23.5	43.2	43.2	56.9	3.0	0.6	0.5	0.3	1.0	7.1
2002	New York	32	32	30.5	**47.7**	0.0	73.3	4.4	0.7	0.8	**1.3**	1.5	12.7
2003	New York	33	29	24.9	45.5	33.3	65.8	3.7	0.8	1.1	0.7	1.7	8.2
2004	Los Angeles	**34**	5	17.5	44.5	**43.8**	68.1	3.1	0.5	0.4	0.1	1.0	6.2
2005	Los Angeles	**34**	**34**	27.0	43.4	26.3	**86.8**	4.2	1.2	1.0	0.4	1.7	9.6
2006	Indiana	**34**	**34**	**31.1**	45.7	39.5	82.1	4.9	**1.8**	**1.4**	0.4	2.8	**15.5**
2007	Indiana	**34**	25	25.9	41.5	30.0	76.3	**5.0**	1.5	0.6	0.3	2.5	10.9
2008	Connecticut	**34**	33	26.8	40.8	31.5	78.1	4.7	1.4	0.6	0.4	2.0	12.6
2009	Connecticut	24	1	15.7	29.1	30.4	72.7	2.2	1.0	0.4	0.1	**0.8**	4.4
Career	11 years, 4 teams	350	239	24.4	43.2	31.6	74.1	3.9	1.0	0.7	0.4	1.7	9.6

==== Playoffs ====
Year	Team	GP	GS	MPG	FG%	3P%	FT%	RPG	APG	SPG	BPG	TO	PPG
1999	New York	6	0	19.0	48.4	0.0	35.7	1.7	0.5	0.7	0.3	1.7	5.8
2000	New York	7	7	28.0	47.7	50.0	75.0	3.9	0.9	0.4	**1.3**	2.1	11.6
2001	New York	6	6	25.3	40.9	0.0	60.0	3.7	0.7	0.7	0.7	1.2	7.0
2002	New York	**8**	**8**	33.9	**54.8**	33.3	70.3	4.5	1.3	0.4	0.5	1.1	16.1
2004	Los Angeles	3	0	13.0	40.0	0.0	**100.0**	2.0	0.3	0.0	0.0	**1.0**	3.3
2005	Los Angeles	2	2	24.0	42.9	**100.0**	62.5	1.5	0.5	0.5	0.0	3.5	9.0
2006	Indiana	2	2	**34.5**	47.5	28.6	**100.0**	**6.5**	1.0	0.5	0.0	5.0	**26.5**
2007	Indiana	6	0	30.7	44.8	56.5	61.5	5.3	**2.7**	0.5	0.2	3.0	16.5
2008	Connecticut	3	3	29.0	37.5	0.0	66.7	4.7	2.0	**1.3**	0.0	2.7	10.0
Career	9 years, 4 teams	43	28	27.0	46.9	39.1	68.5	3.8	1.1	0.5	0.5	2.0	11.6

=== College ===
Year	Team	GP	GS	MPG	FG%	3P%	FT%	RPG	APG	SPG	BPG	TO	PPG
1995–96	Memphis	30	-	-	57.8	28.6	67.3	5.1	0.8	1.1	0.4	-	10.4
1996–97	Memphis												
1997–98	Memphis	29	-	-	**64.7**	25.0	71.2	**9.9**	**1.3**	**1.8**	**1.6**	-	26.0
1998–99	Memphis	**32**	-	-	58.5	**46.9**	**74.8**	8.4	1.2	1.4	1.0	-	***26.3**
**Career**		91	-	-	60.7	40.2	71.9	7.8	1.1	1.4	1.0	-	21.0
Statistics retrieved from Sports-Reference.
