= Olivia (name) =

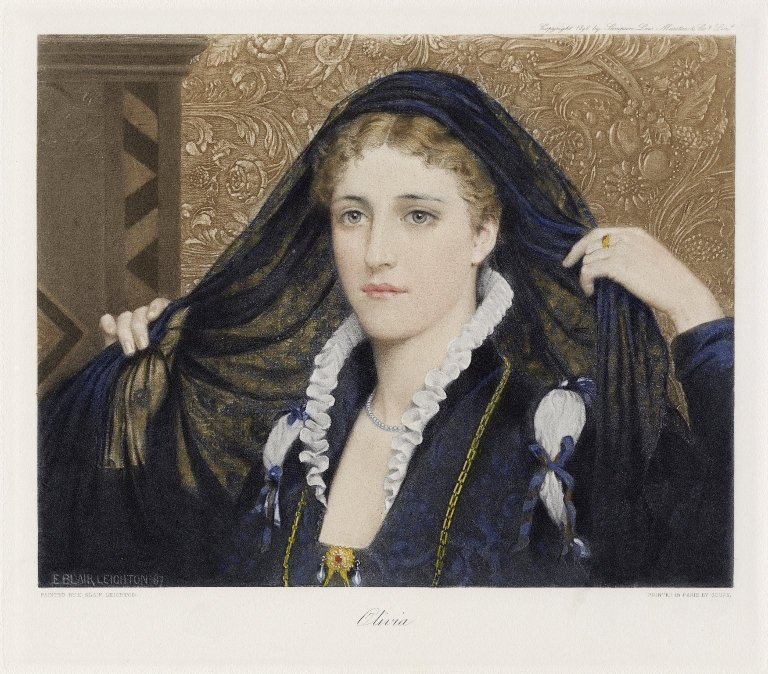
- Olivia from William Shakespeare's Twelfth Night by Edmund Blair Leighton, 1896
- Pronunciation: /oʊˈlɪviə/, Italian: [/o.ˈli.vja/], Spanish: [/o.ˈli.βja/], French: [/ɔ.li.vja/], German: [/o.ˈliː.vi̯a/], Finnish: [/ˈo.li.ʋi.ɑ/], Dutch: [/oː.ˈli.vi.aː/]
- Gender: Feminine
- Language: English
- Name day: April 15 (Sweden) May 29 (Finland) (Greece) June 10 (Italy)

Other gender
- Masculine: Olivio

Origin
- Language: Latin
- Meaning: olive, olive tree, "peace"

Other names
- Pet names: Liv, Livi, Livvy, Livia, Livy, Livvie, Livie, Livvi, Ollie, Olly, Olz, Via
- Usage: English
- Related names: Oliva, Olive, Olivio

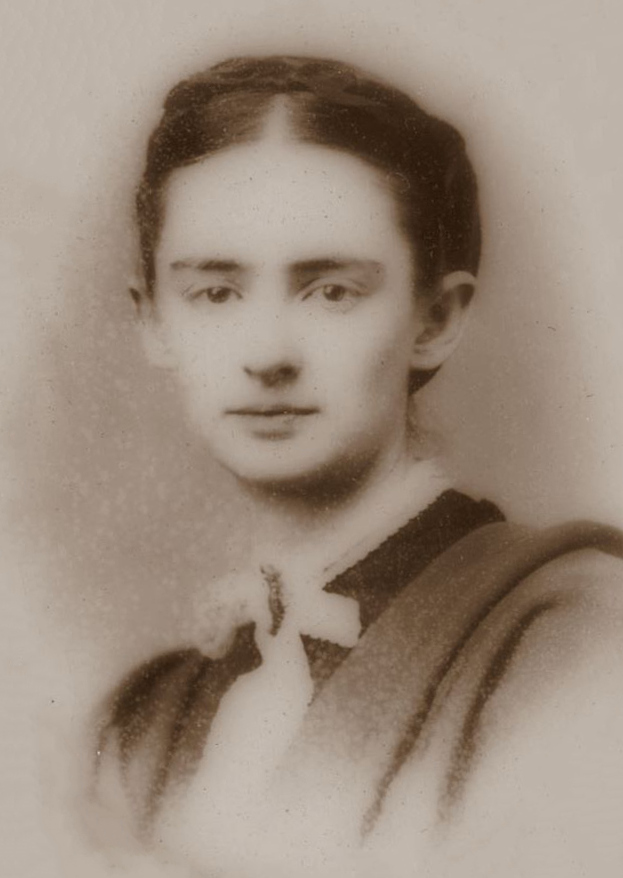
Olivia Langdon Clemens (1845–1904), wife of the American author Mark Twain, in 1869

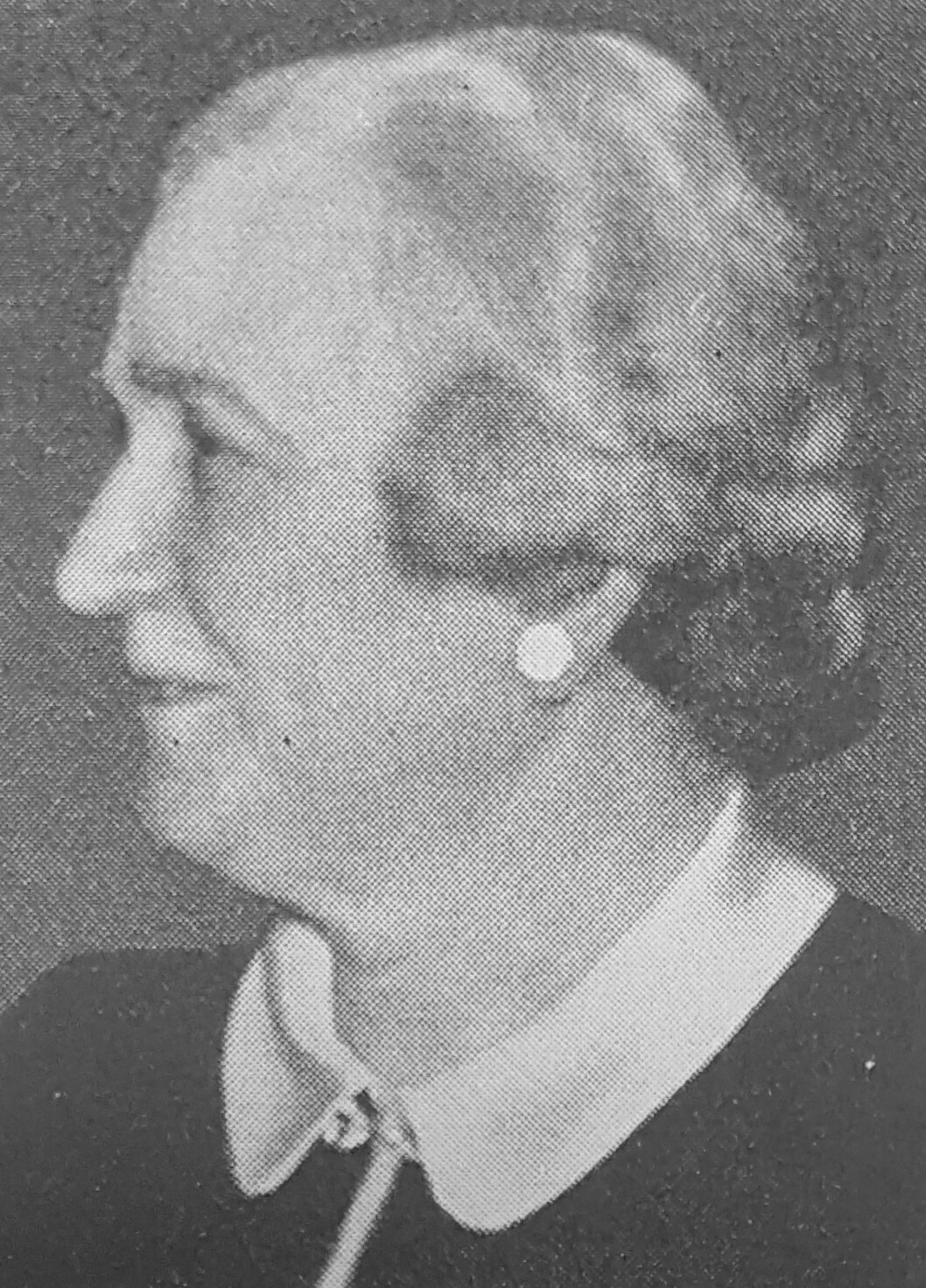
Swedish politician Olivia Nordgren (1880–1969)

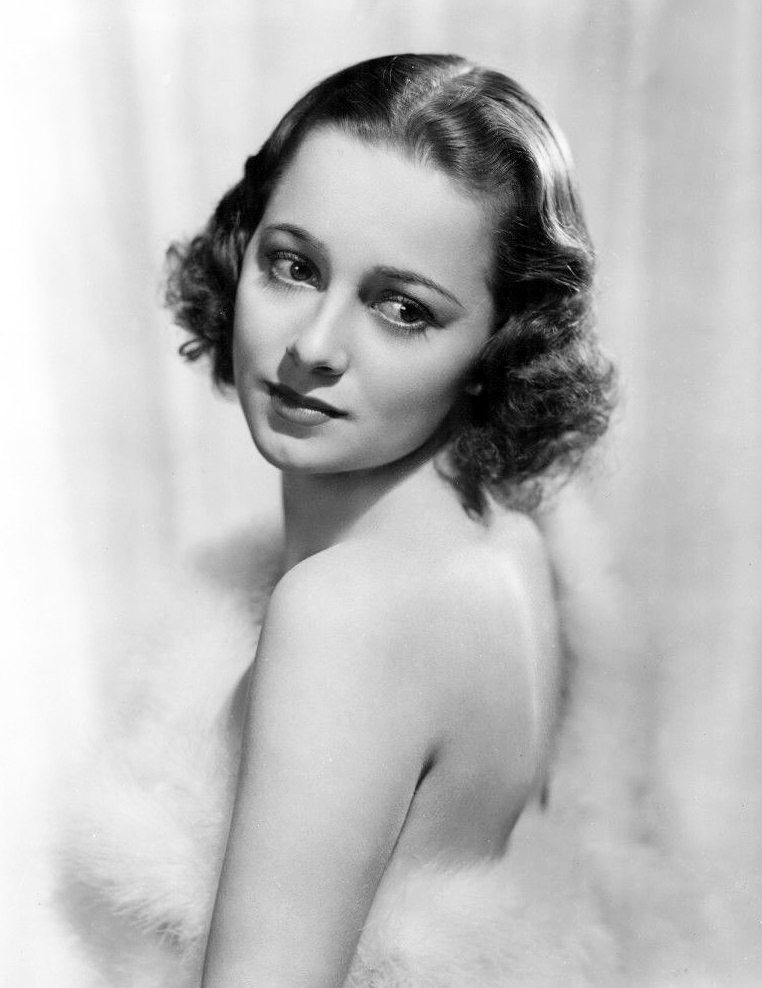
English and American actress Olivia de Havilland (1916–2020), in 1938

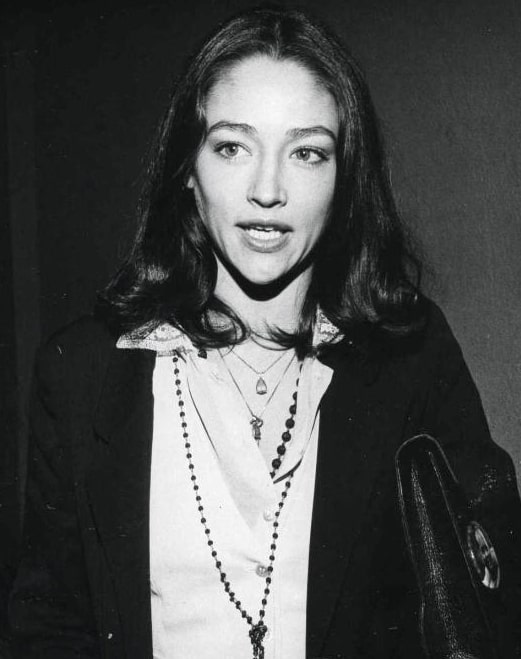
English actress Olivia Hussey (1951–2024), in 1974

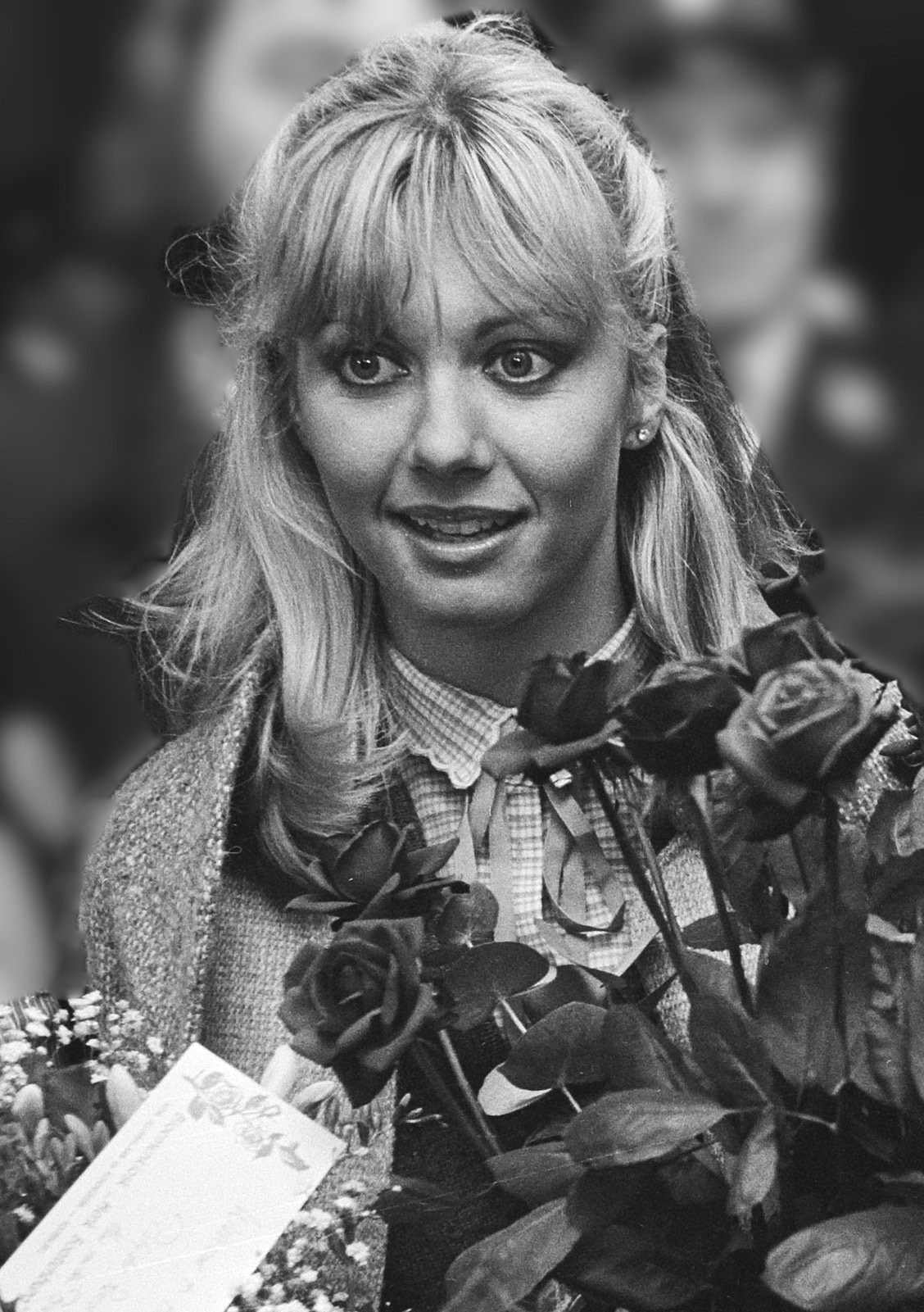
Australian actress Olivia Newton-John (1948–2022), in 1978

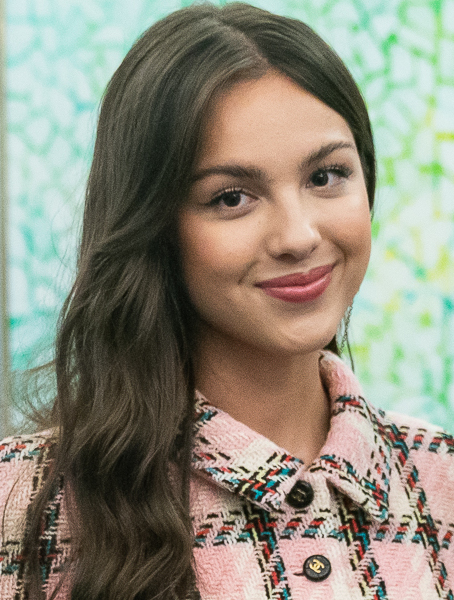
American singer-songwriter and actress Olivia Rodrigo in 2021

Olivia is a feminine given name in the English language. It is derived from Latin oliva, olive. Both Oliva and Olivia were Latinate forms in use in English-speaking countries as early as the 13th century. Olive was in common use as a vernacular form. Though not invented by William Shakespeare, the name was popularized by a character in Twelfth Night.

Usage of the name in the 20th and 21st centuries has been influenced by popular culture, including the popularity of the actress Olivia Newton-John in the 1970s and of Olivia Kendall, a child character played by actress Raven-Symoné on the American television sitcom The Cosby Show. Olivia has been a popular name throughout the English-speaking world since the mid-1990s, and is also well used throughout Europe and South America.

In 1880 (the first year for which records are available), "Olivia" was the 232nd most popular name given to female babies in the United States. Olivia reached a low point in popularity in 1970 when it ranked 542 in female baby names. In 2019, it became the most popular name given to female babies in the U.S.

== Variants ==
- American English: Olevia, Olivea, Olyvea, Oliviyah
- Asturian: Ouliva
- Croatian: Olivija
- Czech: Olívie, Olivie
- English: Aliveah, Alivia, Aliviah, Alivya, Alivyah, Alyvia, Elivia, Oliviah, Ollivia, Olyvia, Olyviah, Olivya, Olyvya
- Estonian: Oliivia
- Faroese: Olivina
- Greek: Ολύβια, Ολιββία
- Hawaiian: Oliwa
- Hungarian: Olívia
- Icelandic: Ólivía
- Indonesian: Olivia
- Irish: Olibhia
- Kashubian: Òlëwiô
- Latvian: Olīvia, Olīvija
- Lithuanian: Olivija
- Polish: Oliwia
- Portuguese: Olívia
- Russian: Оливия
- Scots: Oleevia
- Slovak: Olívia
- Slovene: Olivija
- Ukrainian: Олівія

== People ==
- Olivia of Palermo (448–463), Christian martyr
- Olivia Addams (born 1996), Romanian singer and songwriter
- Olivia Ahn, British medical doctor
- Olivia Alexander (born 1988), American actress
- Olivia Allison (born 1990), English swimmer
- Olivia Amoako (born 1985), Ghanaian footballer
- Olivia Anderson (born 1987), South African cricketer
- Olivia Apps (born 1998), Canadian rugby and sevens player
- Olivia Arthur (born 1980), British documentary photographer
- Olivia Asselin (born 2004), Canadian freestyle skier
- Olivia Athens (born 1998), American professional soccer player
- Olivia Attwood (born 1991), British TV personality
- Olivia Atwater, Canadian author
- Olivia Ausoni (1923–2010), Swiss alpine skier
- Olivia Baker (weightlifter) (born 1979), New Zealand weightlifter
- Olivia Ball, Australian human rights advocate and politician
- Olivia Barash (born 1965), American actress
- Olivia Barclay (1919–2001), British astrologer
- Olivia Cajero Bedford (1938–2022), American politician
- Olivia Bee (born 1994), American photographer
- Olivia Bell (born 2003), English-born Scottish cricketer
- Olivia Bennet, Countess of Tankerville (1830–1922), British countess
- Olivia De Berardinis (born 1948), American painter
- Olivia Bergström (born 1996), Swedish Olympian sailor
- Olivia Gallay Bertrand (born 1989), French alpine skier
- Olivia Black (born 1994), Danish handball player
- Olivia Blake (born 1990), British MP
- Olivia Bloomfield, Baroness Bloomfield of Hinton Waldrist (born 1960), British political party executive
- Olivia Bonamy (born 1972), French actress
- Olivia Bonelli (1920–1990), American soprano
- Olivia Bonilla (born 1992), American singer-songwriter and actress
- Olivia de Borbón von Hardenberg (born 1974), Spanish aristocrat
- Olivia Borlée (born 1986), Belgian sprinter
- Olivia Bouffard-Nesbitt (born 1992), Canadian cross-country skier
- Olivia Bowen (born 1993), English reality television personality and model
- Olivia Breen (born 1996), British Paralympian athlete
- Olivia Broadfield (born 1981), English singer-songwriter
- Olivia Broome, British para powerlifter
- Olivia Brown (born 1960), American actress
- Olivia Bucio (born 1954), Mexican actress
- Olivia Buckingham (born 1983), British socialite and journalist
- Olivia Buckley (1799–1847), English harpist, organist and composer
- Olivia Bunn (born 1979), Hong Kong-born Australian equestrian
- Olivia Burges (died 1930), British scouting and guiding advocate
- Olivia Burnette (born 1977), American actress
- Olivia Ward Bush-Banks (1869–1944), African American author
- Olivia Caramello (born 1984), Italian Mathematician
- Olivia Carlsson (born 1995), Swedish ice hockey player
- Olivia Carnegie-Brown (born 1991), British rower
- Olivia Cattan (born 1967), French journalist
- Olivia Cenizal (1926–2008), Filipino film actress
- Olivia Center (born 2006), American tennis player
- Olivia Chambers (born 2003), American Paralympic swimmer
- Olivia Chance (born 1993), New Zealand footballer
- Olivia Chaney (born 1982), English folk singer
- Olivia Cheng (Hong Kong actress) (born 1960), Hong Kong actress
- Olivia Cheng (Canadian actress), Canadian actress and television journalist
- Olivia Choong (born 1979), environmental activist from Singapore
- Olivia Cîmpian (born 2001), Romanian-born Hungarian female artistic gymnast
- Olivia Chow (born 1957), Canadian politician
- Olivia Clark (born 2001), Welsh professional footballer
- Olivia Langdon Clemens (1845–1901), wife of Mark Twain
- Olivia Clyne (born 1993), American squash player
- Olivia Coffey (born 1989), American rower
- Olivia Cole (1942–2018), American actress
- Olivia Cole (poet) (born 1981), British poet
- Olivia Colman (born 1974), British actress
- Olivia Coolidge (1908–2006), American writer and educator
- Olivia Cooke (born 1993), English actress
- Olivia Côte, French actress
- Olivia Cowan (born 1996), German golfer
- Olivia Crocicchia (born 1995), American actress
- Olivia Culpo (born 1992), American beauty pageant titleholder who won Miss USA and Miss Universe 2012
- Olivia Cummins (born 2003), American track and road cyclist
- Olivia Curry (born 1989), American boxer
- Olivia d'Abo (born 1969), British actress, singer and songwriter
- Olivia Dahl (1955–1962), daughter of Roald Dahl
- Olivia A. Davidson (1854–1889), American teacher and educator
- Olivia Dean (born 1999), English singer
- Olivia Dean (archer) (born 2007), American archer
- Olivia Delcán (born 1992), Spanish actress, playwright and director
- Olivia Deeble (born 2002), Australian actress
- Olivia DeJonge (born 1998), Australian actress
- Olivia DeMerchant (born 1991), Canadian rugby union player
- Olivia Mariamne Devenish (1771–1814), British socialite
- Olivia De Berardinis (born 1948), American artist
- Olivia Taylor Dudley (born 1985), American actress
- Olivia Dunne (born 2002), American gymnast and internet personality
- Olivia Époupa (born 1994), French basketball player
- Olivia Falk (born 2009), German rhythmic gymnast
- Olivia Féry born 1973), French former professional tennis player
- Olivia Flores (born 2007), American figure skater
- Olivia Foa'i, New Zealand musician
- Olivia Fotopoulou (born 1996), Cypriot track and field athlete
- Olivia Fuchs (born 1963), British-German opera director
- Olivia Gadecki (born 2002), Australian tennis player
- Olivia Gant (2010–2017), American child abuse victim
- Olivia Giaccio (born 2000), American freestyle skier
- Olivia Goldsmith (1949–2004), American writer
- Olivia Green (born 1999), British modern pentathlete
- Olivia Grégoire (born 1978), French politician
- Olivia Gollan (born 1973), Australian cyclist
- Olivia Gomez (born 1953), Bangladeshi actress
- Olivia González (born 1978), Mexican synchronized swimmer
- Olivia Grosvenor, Duchess of Westminster (born 1992), British aristocrat and businesswoman
- Olivia Grüner (born 1969), German mountain runner
- Olivia Gürth (born 2002), German athlete
- Olivia Harlan (born 1993), American sportscaster
- Olivia Hamilton (born 1987), American actress and producer
- Olivia Harrison (born 1948), American author and film producer, widow of musician George Harrison of the Beatles
- Olivia Hallinan (born 1985), English actress
- Olivia de Havilland (1916–2020), British-American actress
- Olivia Hill, American politician and engineer
- Olivia Hofmann (born 1992), Austrian sports shooter
- Olivia Holdt (born 2001), Danish professional footballer
- Olivia Holt (born 1997), American actress
- Olivia Hooker (1915–2018), American psychologist
- Olivia Hussey (1951–2024), British actress
- Olivia Hye (born Son Hye-ju, 2001), South Korean singer and dancer, member of the girl group Loona
- Olivia Jade (born 1999), American YouTuber
- Olivia Jean (born 1990), American singer, songwriter, and multi-instrumentalist
- Olivia Jordan (born 1988), American beauty pageant titleholder
- Olivia Judson (born 1970), British biologist
- Olivia Julianna (born 2002), American political activist
- Olivia Junkeer (born 1999), Australian actress
- Olivia Knowles (born 1999), Canadian ice hockey player
- Olivia Laing (born 1977), British writer, novelist and cultural critic
- Olivia Lee (born 1980), British comedian, actress and writer
- Olivia Levicki (born 1993), Australian rules footballer and basketball player
- Olivia Leyva (1948–2019), Mexican actress, television presenter and model
- Olivia Liang (born 1993), American actress
- Olivia Livki (born 1988), Polish-born German musician, singer, arranger and filmmaker
- Olivia Llewellyn (born 1980), English actress,
- Olivia Loe (born 1992), New Zealand rower
- Olivia Theresa Longott (born 1981), American R&B singer
- Olivia Lozano (born 1959), Venezuelan politician
- Olivia Lufkin (born 1979), Japanese-American singer known mononymously as Olivia
- Olivia Lunny (born 1999), Canadian singer-songwriter and musician
- Olivia Lux (born 1994), American drag performer
- Olivia Manning (1908–1980), British writer
- Olivia McKoy (born 1973), Jamaican athlete
- Olivia McTaggart (born 2000), New Zealand pole vault athlete
- Olivia McVeigh, Northern Irish makeup artist, influencer and podcaster
- Olivia Merilahti (born 1982), Finnish-French singer and composer
- Olivia Merry (born 1992), New Zealand field hockey player
- Olivia Miles (born 2003), American basketball player
- Olivia Mobley (born 2001), American ice hockey player
- Olivia Molina (born 1946), Danish-born Mexican singer
- Olivia Morris (born 1997), English actress
- Olivia Munn (born 1980), American actress
- Olivia Nakitanda (born 1984), Ugandan swimmer
- Olivia Nash (born 1943), Irish actress and performer
- Olivia Nelson-Ododa (born 2000), American basketball player
- Olivia Newman, American film director and screenwriter
- Olivia Newton-John (1948–2022), English-born Australian singer and actress
- Olivia Nicholls (born 1994), British tennis player
- Olivia Nobs (born 1982), Swiss snowboarder
- Olivia Nordgren (1880–1969), Swedish politician
- Olivia Norris (born 1983), German javelin thrower
- Olivia Nuzzi (born 1993), American political journalist
- Olivia O'Brien (born 1999), American singer and songwriter
- Olivia O'Leary (born 1949), Irish journalist
- Olivia O'Toole (born 1971), Irish association footballer
- Olivia Olson (born 1992), American actress, singer-songwriter and screenwriter
- Olivia Olson (born 2005), American basketball player
- Olivia Onesti (born 2003), French cyclist
- Olivia Ong (born 1985), Singaporean singer
- Olivia Page (footballer, born 2005) (born 2005), New Zealand footballer
- Olivia Pascal (born 1957), German actress
- Olivia Potts, British food writer and caterer
- Olivia Poulet (born 1978), English actress and screenwriter
- Olivia Price (born 1992), Australian Olympian sailor
- Olivia Reeves (born 2003), American weightlifter
- Olivia Rodrigo (born 2003), American singer-songwriter and actress
- Olivia Ross (born 1992), British-French actress
- Olivia Rouamba, Burkina Faso politician
- Olivia Ruiz (born 1980), French singer
- Olivia Saar (1931–2025), Estonian children's writer, poet, journalist and editor
- Olivia Sandoval, American actress
- Olivia Sage or Margaret Olivia Slocum Sage (1828–1918), American philanthropist
- Olivia Schough (born 1991), Swedish footballer
- Olivia Shakespear (1863–1938), British novelist, playwright, and patron of the arts
- Olivia Shannon (born 2001), New Zealand field hockey player
- Olivia Smart (born 1997), British-born Spanish ice dancer
- Olivia Smoliga (born 1994), American swimmer
- Olivia Tennet (born 1991), New Zealand actress
- Olivia Thirlby (born 1986), American actress
- Olivia Trappeniers (born 1997), Belgian Flemish singer, also known as OT and by the mononym Olivia
- Olivia Troye (born 1976), American national security official
- Olivia Trummer (born 1985), German pianist
- Olivia Ulenius (born 2007), Finnish footballer
- Olivia Vinten (born 1999), Danish fashion model
- Olivia Van der Jagt (born 1999), American professional soccer player
- Olivia van Rooijen (born 1988), Dutch rower
- Olivia Vieweg (born 1987), German cartoonist and author
- Olivia Vinall (born 1988/1989), English actress
- Olivia Vivian (born 1989), Australian artistic gymnast
- Olivia Vukoša (born 2008), Croatian basketball player
- Olivia Wallin (born 2002), Canadian ice hockey player
- Olivia Washington (born 1991), American actress
- Olivia Wayne (born 1986), British sports journalist and television presenter
- Olivia Weaver (born 1995), American professional squash player
- Olivia Scott Welch, American actress
- Olivia Wensley (born 1985), New Zealand lawyer
- Olivia Whitlam (born 1985), British rower
- Olivia Wilde (born 1984), American actress
- Olivia Wingate (born 2000), American soccer player
- Olivia Williams (born 1968), English actress
- Olivia Yli-Juuti (born 2001), Finnish aesthetic group gymnast
- Olivia Zafuto (born 1997), American ice hockey player
- Olivia Zemor (born 1948), French political activist
- Olivia Zúñiga (1916–1992), Mexican poet, novelist, and essayist

== Fictional characters ==
- Olivia (Twelfth Night), in Shakespeare's play Twelfth Night
- Olivia (The Walking Dead), in the comic book and TV franchise
- Olivia, in Buffy the Vampire Slayer
- Olivia (fictional pig), protagonist of children's books by Ian Falconer and the television show Olivia The Pig
- Olivia, in the 1983 film Olivia
- Olivia (Asobi Asobase), in the manga series Asobi Asobase
- Olivia Bell, in the television series, Neighbours
- Olivia Barber Winters, on the American soap opera The Young and the Restless
- Olivia Benford, on FlashForward, played by Sonya Walger
- Olivia Benson, on Law & Order: Special Victims Unit, played by Mariska Hargitay
- Olivia Burke, in the television series Gossip Girl
- Olivia Castle, from the horror movie Final Destination 5
- Olivia Cortez, a character in the American thriller television series Mr. Robot
- Olivia Dealy, in the 1951 film Olivia
- Olivia Dunham, in the television series Fringe
- Olivia Falconeri, from the long-running American soap opera General Hospital
- Olivia Fuller, from Family Guy
- Olivia Harper, in the American comedy-drama Grey's Anatomy
- Olivia Johnson, from Hollyoaks
- Olivia Kidney, in the Olivia Kidney book series by Ellen Potter
- Olivia Pope, in the television series Scandal
- Olivia Richards, from the American soap opera Sunset Beach
- Olivia Robinson, played by Alaina Reed on the long-running children's series Sesame Street
- Olivia Spencer, from the long-running American soap opera Guiding Light
- Olivia Walton, in the television series The Waltons

== See also ==
- Olívia (given name)
- Oliwia
