= List of 2016–17 WNBL season results =

2016–17 WNBL regular season
- League: Women's National Basketball League
- Sport: Basketball
- Duration: 7 October 2016 – 19 February 2017
- Teams: 8

Regular season

Finals

WNBL seasons
- ← 2015–16 2017–18 →

The 2016–17 WNBL season is the 37th season of competition since its establishment in 1981. The regular season began on October 7, 2016 when the Sydney Uni Flames host the Perth Lynx and is scheduled to conclude on February 19, 2017.

== Team standings ==
#	WNBL Championship Ladder				
#	Team	W	L	PCT	GP
1	Sydney Uni Flames	18	6	75.00	24
2	Dandenong Rangers	15	9	62.50	24
3	Perth Lynx	15	9	62.50	24
4	Townsville Fire	14	10	58.33	24
5	Canberra Capitals	13	11	54.17	24
6	Bendigo Spirit	13	11	54.17	24
7	Melbourne Boomers	5	19	20.83	24
8	Adelaide Lightning	3	21	12.50	24

== Regular season ==
=== Round 1 ===
7 October 2016
7:30pm

Boxscore

Sydney Uni Flames	90–93	Perth Lynx
Scoring by quarter: 26–26, 21–21, 21–23, 22–23
Pts: Hamson 19; Rebs: Hamson 17; Asts: Mitchell, Snell 9		Pts: Mijović 30; Rebs: Mijović, Hamblin 9 Asts: Wright 6

Brydens Stadium, Sydney, New South Wales
Referees: Mark Caldwell, Nicolas Fernandez, Guy Richards

8 October 2016
3:00pm

Boxscore

Canberra Capitals	69–71	Dandenong Rangers
Scoring by quarter: 25–14, 16–18, 13–18, 15–21
Pts: Mansfield 17; Rebs: Gwathmey, Tolo 10; Asts: Mansfield 6		Pts: Blicavs 23; Rebs: Scherf 9 Asts: Novosel 2

Southern Cross Stadium, Canberra, Australian Capital Territory
Referees: Simon Cosier, Robert Rice, Jack Taylor

8 October 2016
7:30pm

Boxscore

Bendigo Spirit	77–63 (OT)	Adelaide Lightning
Scoring by quarter: 12–21, 18–10, 16–12, 15–18, Overtime: 16–2
Pts: Raincock-Ekunwe 16; Rebs: Raincock-Ekunwe 11; Asts: Griffin 5		Pts: Hodges 20; Rebs: Hodges 9 Asts: Logic 4

Bendigo Stadium, Bendigo, Victoria
Referees: Chris Clark, Daniel Battye, Craig Copes

9 October 2016
1:00pm

Boxscore

Townsville Fire	84–62	Perth Lynx
Scoring by quarter: 19–18, 22–16, 27–14, 16–14
Pts: Batkovic 25; Rebs: Batkovic 11; Asts: Wilson 6		Pts: Whitcomb 25; Rebs: Burton 8 Asts: three tied 1

Townsville RSL Stadium, Townsville, Queensland
Referees: Scott Brown, Kylie Voevodin, Aaron Gilboy

9 October 2016
3:00pm

Boxscore

Melbourne Boomers	75–69	Adelaide Lightning
Scoring by quarter: 25–18, 17–19, 11–14, 22–18
Pts: Kunek 21; Rebs: Black 11; Asts: Kunek 4		Pts: Hodges 21; Rebs: Hodges 10; Asts: Logic 7

State Basketball Centre, Melbourne, Victoria
Referees: Jason Kelly, Sarah Carey, David Baddock

=== Round 2 ===
14 October 2016
7:00pm

Boxscore

Canberra Capitals	70–64	Adelaide Lightning
Scoring by quarter: 15–10, 14–13, 19–17, 22–24
Pts: Ruef 18; Rebs: Tolo 16; Asts: Mansfield 4		Pts: Logic 19; Rebs: Planeta 13; Asts: Logic 3

Southern Cross Stadium, Canberra, Australian Capital Territory
Referees: Simon Cosier, Robert Rice, Chris Vogelsinger

15 October 2016
7:00pm

Boxscore

Bendigo Spirit	59–44	Dandenong Rangers
Scoring by quarter: 18–8, 18–12, 16–11, 7–13
Pts: Raincock-Ekunwe 18; Rebs: Raincock-Ekunwe 14; Asts: Oliver 3		Pts: Novosel 9 Rebs: three tied 4 Asts: Clydesdale, Novosel 2

Bendigo Stadium, Bendigo, Victoria
Referees: Chris Clark, Jason Kelly, Justin Hamilton

15 October 2016
7:30pm

Boxscore

Melbourne Boomers	85–88	Perth Lynx
Scoring by quarter: 25–27, 22–19, 21–17, 17–25
Pts: Smart 19; Rebs: Bygate 8 Asts: Kunek 7		Pts: Mijović 27; Rebs: Hamblin 7 Asts: Whitcomb 5

State Basketball Centre, Melbourne, Victoria
Referees: Sarah Carey, Daniel Battye, Kahli Symons

16 October 2016
1:00pm

Boxscore

Townsville Fire	85–56	Adelaide Lightning
Scoring by quarter: 22–10, 24–9, 23–19, 16–18
Pts: Standish 18; Rebs: Standish 8 Asts: Cloud 4		Pts: Hodges 20; Rebs: Hodges 10; Asts: Logic 7

Townsville RSL Stadium, Townsville, Queensland
Referees: Kylie Voevodin, Scott Brown, Aaron Gilboy

16 October 2016
5:00pm

Boxscore

Dandenong Rangers	94–74	Perth Lynx
Scoring by quarter: 26–16, 26–26, 21–19, 21–13
Pts: Cumming 31; Rebs: Cumming 12; Asts: Novosel 9		Pts: Whitcomb 23; Rebs: Mijović 9 Asts: Edmondson 6

Dandenong Stadium, Dandenong, Victoria
Referees: Todd Spain, David Baddock, Jason Taylor

16 October 2016
5:00pm

Boxscore

Sydney Uni Flames	80–89	Canberra Capitals
Scoring by quarter: 23–17, 21–25, 19–23, 17–24
Pts: Mitchell 20; Rebs: Hamson 10; Asts: Mitchell 9		Pts: Tolo 38; Rebs: Ruef 14; Asts: Mansfield, Ruef 6

Brydens Stadium, Sydney, New South Wales
Referees: James Boyer, Mark Caldwell, Shahrad Shafaghi

=== Round 3 ===
21 October 2016
5:00pm

Boxscore

Adelaide Lightning	61–66	Melbourne Boomers
Scoring by quarter: 8–15, 17–22, 11–13, 25–16
Pts: Hodges 14; Rebs: Roberts 12; Asts: Logic 8		Pts: Kunek 17; Rebs: Kunek, Thompson 6 Asts: Kunek 5

Adelaide Arena, Adelaide, South Australia
Referees: Nathan Wieland, Michelle Aylen, Nicki Ireland

21 October 2016
7:30pm

Boxscore

Bendigo Spirit	69–74	Sydney Uni Flames
Scoring by quarter: 32–20, 13–19, 15–18, 9–17
Pts: Raincock-Ekunwe 17; Rebs: Griffin 8 Asts: Griffin 5		Pts: Taylor, Wilson 15; Rebs: Boag 7 Asts: Mitchell 5

Bendigo Stadium, Bendigo, Victoria
Referees: Jon Chapman, Todd Spain, Daniel Battye

21 October 2016
7:30pm

Boxscore

Dandenong Rangers	92–65	Townsville Fire
Scoring by quarter: 24–22, 20–14, 32–17, 16–12
Pts: Cumming 21; Rebs: Blicavs, Scherf 8 Asts: Clydesdale, Cumming 6		Pts: Batkovic 18; Rebs: Batkovic 10; Asts: Standish 5

Dandenong Stadium Dandenong, Victoria
Referees: David Baddock, Raoul Kirsten, Kahli Symons

22 October 2016
7:00pm

Boxscore

Sydney Uni Flames	69–68	Townsville Fire
Scoring by quarter: 19–24, 19–24, 18–8, 13–12
Pts: Mitchell 20; Rebs: Taylor 13; Asts: Snell 7		Pts: Murray 16; Rebs: Batkovic 10; Asts: Wilson 7

Brydens Stadium, Sydney, New South Wales
Referees: Simon Cosier, James Boyer, Chris Vogelsinger

22 October 2016
7:00pm

Boxscore

Perth Lynx	65–59	Canberra Capitals
Scoring by quarter: 12–19, 12–11, 23–16, 18–13
Pts: Whitcomb 23; Rebs: Hamblin 9 Asts: Whitcomb 4		Pts: Tolo 22; Rebs: Tolo 13; Asts: Mansfield 7

Bendat Basketball Centre, Perth, Western Australia
Referees: Steve Diconza, Mark Grist, Adrian Diconza

23 October 2016
2:00pm

Boxscore

Melbourne Boomers	71–67	Bendigo Spirit
Scoring by quarter: 15–20, 10–19, 26–12, 20–16
Pts: Smart 17; Rebs: Smart 9 Asts: Cole, Smart 4		Pts: Raincock-Ekunwe 21; Rebs: Griffin 11; Asts: Griffin 5

State Basketball Centre, Melbourne, Victoria
Referees: Chris Clark, Jason Kelly, Sarah Carey

=== Round 4 ===
28 October 2016
7:00pm

Boxscore

Canberra Capitals	64–55	Melbourne Boomers
Scoring by quarter: 17–10, 15–11, 8–19, 24–15
Pts: Mansfield 13; Rebs: Ruef 22; Asts: Mansfield 7		Pts: Kunek, Thompson 9 Rebs: Thompson 9 Asts: Garrick, Kunek 2

Southern Cross Stadium, Canberra, Australian Capital Territory
Referees: Simon Cosier, Robert Rice, Mark Caldwell

28 October 2016
7:30pm

Boxscore

Dandenong Rangers	85–94	Bendigo Spirit
Scoring by quarter: 22–25, 18–22, 21–19, 24–28
Pts: Cumming 24; Rebs: Scherf 5 Asts: Blicavs, Cumming 5		Pts: Raincock-Ekunwe 19; Rebs: Raincock-Ekunwe 11; Asts: Dietrick, Raincock-Ekunwe 4

Dandenong Stadium, Dandenong, Victoria
Referees: Jason Kelly, Sarah Carey, Todd Spain

30 October 2016
1:00pm

Boxscore

Townsville Fire	62–74	Bendigo Spirit
Scoring by quarter: 15–20, 13–19, 14–24, 20–11
Pts: Batkovic 20; Rebs: Murray 7 Asts: three tied 3		Pts: Raincock-Ekunwe 14; Rebs: Raincock-Ekunwe 10; Asts: Karaitiana, Richards 3

Townsville RSL Stadium, Townsville, Queensland
Referees: Scott Brown, Kylie Voevodin, Daniel Smith

30 October 2016
1:00pm

Boxscore

Perth Lynx	95–63	Adelaide Lightning
Scoring by quarter: 23–16, 30–12, 23–14, 19–21
Pts: Whitcomb 29; Rebs: Hamblin 10; Asts: Whitcomb 9		Pts: Hodges 21; Rebs: Hodges 7 Asts: Logic 10

Bendat Basketball Centre, Perth, Western Australia
Referees: Mark Grist, Steve Diconza, Craig Copes

31 October 2016
7:30pm

Boxscore

Melbourne Boomers	67–69	Dandenong Rangers
Scoring by quarter: 29–16, 12–25, 12–12, 14–16
Pts: Garrick 18; Rebs: Black 13; Asts: Smart 3		Pts: Blicavs 28; Rebs: Todhunter 12; Asts: Clydesdale 4

State Basketball Centre, Melbourne, Victoria
Referees: Jon Chapman, David Baddock, Justin Hamilton

=== Round 5 ===
5 November 2016
7:00pm

Boxscore

Townsville Fire	85–83 (OT)	Sydney Uni Flames
Scoring by quarter: 26–16, 15–19, 17–24, 18–17, Overtime: 9–7
Pts: Standish 22; Rebs: Batkovic 12; Asts: Wilson 7		Pts: Mitchell 16; Rebs: Taylor 13; Asts: Taylor 6

Townsville RSL Stadium, Townsville, Queensland
Referees: Kylie Voevodin, Simon Cosier, Aaron Gilboy

5 November 2016
7:30pm

Boxscore

Bendigo Spirit	70–58	Canberra Capitals
Scoring by quarter: 15–17, 22–12, 14–14, 19–15
Pts: Raincock-Ekunwe 22; Rebs: Griffin 12; Asts: Griffin, Harrington 4		Pts: Tolo 19; Rebs: four tied 7 Asts: Mansfield 6

Bendigo Stadium, Bendigo, Victoria
Referees: Jon Chapman, Sarah Carey, Kahli Symons

6 November 2016
2:00pm

Boxscore

Dandenong Rangers	70–83	Canberra Capitals
Scoring by quarter: 15–16, 17–24, 18–26, 20–17
Pts: Cumming 22; Rebs: Blicavs 11; Asts: Cumming 6		Pts: Mansfield 29; Rebs: Tolo 11; Asts: Tolo 7

Dandenong Stadium, Dandenong, Victoria
Referees: Daniel Battye, Justin Hamilton, Raoul Kirsten

6 November 2016
2:00pm

Boxscore

Perth Lynx	90–59	Melbourne Boomers
Scoring by quarter: 30–12, 29–22, 14–14, 17–11
Pts: Whitcomb 21; Rebs: Hamblin 11; Asts: Lavey 8		Pts: Smart 16; Rebs: Black, Thompson 7 Asts: Thompson 3

Bendat Basketball Centre, Perth, Western Australia
Referees: Steve Diconza, Mark Grist, Adrian Diconza

=== Round 6 ===
11 November 2016
7:30pm

Boxscore

Sydney Uni Flames	87–75	Melbourne Boomers
Scoring by quarter: 23–13, 19–27, 22–17, 23–18
Pts: Taylor 20; Rebs: Boag 10; Asts: Mitchell, Snell 8		Pts: Bowen 19; Rebs: Black, Smart 6 Asts: Cole 7

Brydens Stadium, Sydney, New South Wales
Referees: James Boyer, Nico Fernandes, Rebecca Brockway

12 November 2016
7:00pm

Boxscore

Dandenong Rangers	82–63	Canberra Capitals
Scoring by quarter: 23–14, 22–10, 23–17, 14–22
Pts: Cumming 18; Rebs: Blicavs 8 Asts: Cumming 5		Pts: Three tied 11; Rebs: Tolo 9 Asts: Mansfield 4

Traralgon Sports Centre, Traralgon, Victoria
Referees: Daniel Battye, Todd Spain, Troy Earle

12 November 2016
7:30pm

Boxscore

Bendigo Spirit	69–71	Townsville Fire
Scoring by quarter: 17–16, 19–18, 14–18, 19–19
Pts: Raincock-Ekunwe 20; Rebs: Raincock-Ekunwe 10; Asts: Harrington, Payne 4		Pts: Batkovic 18; Rebs: Batkovic 8 Asts: Kame, Standish 4

Bendigo Stadium, Bendigo, Victoria
Referees: Daniel Baddock, Jason Kelly, Justin Hamilton

12 November 2016
7:30pm

Boxscore

Adelaide Lightning	63–75	Perth Lynx
Scoring by quarter: 18–25, 12–23, 16–15, 17–12
Pts: Planeta 24; Rebs: Planeta 9 Asts: Logic 7		Pts: Whitcomb 23; Rebs: Hamblin 10; Asts: Three tied 3

Adelaide Arena, Adelaide, South Australia

13 November 2016
3:00pm

Boxscore

Melbourne Boomers	72–74	Townsville Fire
Scoring by quarter: 28–27, 9–11, 18–20, 17–16
Pts: Kunek 21; Rebs: Smart 7 Asts: Cunningham, Kunek 6		Pts: Batkovic, Standish 16; Rebs: Batkovic 8 Asts: Cloud 7

State Basketball Centre, Melbourne, Victoria
Referees: Jon Chapman, Chris Clark, Kahli Symons

=== Round 7 ===
18 November 2016
7:00pm

Boxscore

Perth Lynx	71–84	Bendigo Spirit
Scoring by quarter: 27–27, 17–13, 13–19, 14–25
Pts: Whitcomb 39; Rebs: Mijović 11; Asts: Lavey 5		Pts: Griffin 31; Rebs: Richards 9 Asts: Richards 4

Bendat Basketball Centre, Perth, Western Australia
Referees: Mark Grist, Steve Diconza, Adrian Diconza

19 November 2016
7:00pm

Boxscore

Canberra Capitals	81–77	Townsville Fire
Scoring by quarter: 18–23, 18–15, 22–17, 23–22
Pts: Gaze 18; Rebs: Ruef 17; Asts: Mansfield 6		Pts: Batkovic 27; Rebs: Batkovic 11; Asts: Murray 5

Southern Cross Stadium, Canberra, Australian Capital Territory
Referees: Robert Rice, Mark Caldwell, Jack Taylor

19 November 2016
7:30pm

Boxscore

Adelaide Lightning	51–74	Bendigo Spirit
Scoring by quarter: 10–17, 11–15, 14–25, 16–17
Pts: Good 13; Rebs: Roberts 6 Asts: Logic 6		Pts: Payne 13; Rebs: Griffin, Payne 8 Asts: Griffin 4

Adelaide Arena, Adelaide, South Australia
Referees: Nathan Durant, Nathan Wieland, Nikki Ireland

20 November 2016
2:00pm

Boxscore

Dandenong Rangers	78–69	Melbourne Boomers
Scoring by quarter: 28–15, 21–8, 15–20, 14–26
Pts: Cumming 22; Rebs: Malott 8 Asts: Todhunter 5		Pts: Smart 16; Rebs: Black 12; Asts: Cole 9

Dandenong Stadium, Dandenong, Victoria
Referees: Sarah Carey, Jay Kelly, Todd Spain

20 November 2016
3:00pm

Boxscore

Sydney Uni Flames	78–72	Townsville Fire
Scoring by quarter: 20–14, 25–21, 17–22, 16–15
Pts: Taylor 25; Rebs: Taylor 11; Asts: Mitchell 8		Pts: Batkovic 28; Rebs: Batkovic 8 Asts: Cloud 7

Brydens Stadium, Sydney, New South Wales
Referees: Simon Cosier, Shahrad Shafaghi, Nico Fernandes

=== Round 8 ===
25 November 2016
7:00pm

Boxscore

Townsville Fire	85–89	Perth Lynx
Scoring by quarter: 25–27, 15–23, 14–16, 31–23
Pts: Standish 24; Rebs: Standish 12; Asts: Cloud 9		Pts: Whitcomb 22; Rebs: Edmondson 11; Asts: Lavey 7

Townsville RSL Stadium, Townsville, Queensland
Referees: Kylie Voevodin, Aaron Gilboy, Scott Brown

25 November 2016
7:30pm

Boxscore

Sydney Uni Flames	93–86 (OT)	Bendigo Spirit
Scoring by quarter: 23–24, 28–25, 19–20, 14–15, Overtime: 9–2
Pts: Mitchell 18; Rebs: Hamson, Taylor 10; Asts: Mitchell 11		Pts: Griffin 27; Rebs: Raincock-Ekunwe 12; Asts: Dietrick, Richards 4

Brydens Stadium, Sydney, New South Wales
Referees: Mark Caldwell, Shahrad Shafaghi, Rebecca Brockway

26 November 2016
6:30pm

Boxscore

Dandenong Rangers	77–64	Adelaide Lightning
Scoring by quarter: 13–16, 21–16, 20–16, 23–16
Pts: Scherf 21; Rebs: Blicavs 16; Asts: Todhunter 4		Pts: Hodges 18; Rebs: Planeta, Roberts 5 Asts: Elsworthy, Logic 4

Dandenong Stadium, Dandenong, Victoria
Referees: Jon Chapman, Damian Lyons, Troy Earle

27 November 2016
2:00pm

Boxscore

Canberra Capitals	87–82	Perth Lynx
Scoring by quarter: 17–20, 19–26, 27–15, 24–21
Pts: Tolo 25; Rebs: Ruef 11; Asts: Tolo 7		Pts: Whitcomb 36; Rebs: Mijović 9 Asts: Whitcomb 4

Southern Cross Stadium, Canberra, Australian Capital Territory
Referees: Simon Cosier, Jack Taylor, Guy Richards

27 November 2016
3:00pm

Boxscore

Bendigo Spirit	69–51	Adelaide Lightning
Scoring by quarter: 21–13, 8–10, 19–11, 21–17
Pts: Dietrick, Raincock-Ekunwe 14; Rebs: Payne 8 Asts: Griffin 5		Pts: Hodges 20; Rebs: Hodges 10; Asts: Planeta 2

Bendigo Stadium, Bendigo, Victoria
Referees: Todd Spain, Sarah Carey, Daniel Battye

=== Round 9 ===
2 December 2016
7:00pm

Boxscore

Canberra Capitals	83–59	Melbourne Boomers
Scoring by quarter: 11–22, 21–13, 27–8, 24–16
Pts: Ruef 26; Rebs: Ruef 10; Asts: Gwathmey, Mansfield 3		Pts: Smart 21; Rebs: Cole 7 Asts: Kunek 3

Southern Cross Stadium, Canberra, Australian Capital Territory
Referees: Robert Rice, Jack Taylor, Shahrad Shafaghi

2 December 2016
7:00pm

Boxscore

Perth Lynx	80–73	Townsville Fire
Scoring by quarter: 17–14, 22–18, 20–22, 21–19
Pts: Whitcomb 25; Rebs: Hamblin, Mijović 8 Asts: Lavey 6		Pts: Batkovic 25; Rebs: Batkovic 13; Asts: Murray 7

Bendat Basketball Centre, Perth, Western Australia
Referees: Steve Diconza, Peter Houghton, Adrian Diconza

3 December 2016
5:00pm

Boxscore

Adelaide Lightning	54–72	Townsville Fire
Scoring by quarter: 16–17, 11–18, 12–21, 15–16
Pts: Hodges 15; Rebs: Hodges, Logic 7 Asts: Hunter 4		Pts: Murray 26; Rebs: Batkovic 19; Asts: Batkovic 6

Adelaide Arena, Adelaide, South Australia
Referees: Michelle Aylan, Nathan Wieland, Vanessa Devlin

3 December 2016
6:30pm

Boxscore

Dandenong Rangers	91–83	Sydney Uni Flames
Scoring by quarter: 25–27, 18–29, 26–14, 22–13
Pts: Malott 22; Rebs: Todhunter 11; Asts: Cumming 6		Pts: Snell 27; Rebs: Hamson, Snell 7 Asts: Mitchell 7

Dandenong Stadium, Dandenong, Victoria
Referees: Craig Copes, Troy Earle, Kahli Symons

4 December 2016
2:30pm

Boxscore

Melbourne Boomers	71–80	Sydney Uni Flames
Scoring by quarter: 18–20, 14–29, 18–16, 21–15
Pts: Kunek 21; Rebs: Smart 7 Asts: Smart 4		Pts: Mitchell 25; Rebs: Hamson 11; Asts: Snell 6

State Basketball Centre, Melbourne, Victoria
Referees: Raoul Kirsten, Sarah Carey, David Baddock

4 December 2016
3:00pm

Boxscore

Bendigo Spirit	69–77	Dandenong Rangers
Scoring by quarter: 24–22, 20–24, 11–23, 14–8
Pts: Griffin, Richards 19; Rebs: Raincock-Ekunwe 12; Asts: Harrington 4		Pts: Blicavs 20; Rebs: Cumming 8 Asts: Blicavs, Cumming 3

Bendigo Stadium, Bendigo, Victoria
Referees: Daniel Battye, Jason Kelly, Justin Hamilton

=== Round 10 ===
8 December 2016
7:00pm

Boxscore

Canberra Capitals	73–84	Sydney Uni Flames
Scoring by quarter: 8–17, 20–25, 18–23, 27–19
Pts: Tolo 19; Rebs: Ruef 11; Asts: Ruef 5		Pts: Mitchell 23; Rebs: Hamson 10; Asts: Mitchell 6

Southern Cross Stadium, Canberra, Australian Capital Territory
Referees: Simon Cosier, Robert Rice, Jack Taylor

9 December 2016
7:30pm

Boxscore

Adelaide Lightning	64–79	Dandenong Rangers
Scoring by quarter: 13–15, 11–27, 24–20, 16–17
Pts: Planeta 23; Rebs: Planeta 8 Asts: Logic 8		Pts: Blicavs 25; Rebs: Blicavs 13; Asts: Clydesdale 3

Adelaide Arena, Adelaide, South Australia
Referees: Michelle Aylan, Nathan Wieland, Kahli Symons

10 December 2016
7:00pm

Boxscore

Sydney Uni Flames	55–70	Bendigo Spirit
Scoring by quarter: 15–18, 12–13, 13–13, 15–26
Pts: Hamson 16; Rebs: Hamson 8 Asts: Graham 4		Pts: Karaitiana 17; Rebs: Richards 11; Asts: Griffin 4

Brydens Stadium, Sydney, New South Wales
Referees: Jason Kelly, Rebecca Brockway, Shahrad Shafaghi

10 December 2016
7:00pm

Boxscore

Townsville Fire	93–66	Melbourne Boomers
Scoring by quarter: 23–17, 24–23, 19–11, 27–15
Pts: Batkovic 34; Rebs: Batkovic 14; Asts: Cloud 4		Pts: Cunningham 15; Rebs: Cunningham 11; Asts: Cole 5

Townsville RSL Stadium, Townsville, Queensland
Referees: Scott Brown, Todd Spain, Kylie Voevodin

11 December 2016
1:00pm

Boxscore

Perth Lynx	71–92	Dandenong Rangers
Scoring by quarter: 16–22, 17–23, 24–25, 14–22
Pts: Edmondson, Hamblin 14; Rebs: Hamblin 10; Asts: Lavey, Whitcomb 5		Pts: Cumming 22; Rebs: Cumming 11; Asts: Todhunter 5

Bendat Basketball Centre, Perth, Western Australia
Referees: Craig Copes, Steve Diconza, Mark Grist

=== Round 11 ===
16 December 2016
4:30pm

Boxscore

Adelaide Lightning	68–74	Townsville Fire
Scoring by quarter: 22–16, 21–23, 11–17, 14–18
Pts: Planeta 20; Rebs: Planeta 13; Asts: Logic 6		Pts: Batkovic 24; Rebs: Murray 10; Asts: Cloud 5

Adelaide Arena, Adelaide, South Australia
Referees: Nikki Ireland, Nathan Wieland, Vanessa Devlin

16 December 2016
7:30pm

Boxscore

Bendigo Spirit	70–60	Canberra Capitals
Scoring by quarter: 20–13, 19–20, 12–12, 19–15
Pts: Griffin 26; Rebs: Raincock-Ekunwe 12; Asts: Harrington, Raincock-Ekunwe 4		Pts: Tolo 22; Rebs: Ruef 11; Asts: Wehrung 4

Bendigo Stadium, Bendigo, Victoria
Referees: Damian Lyons, Troy Earle, David Baddock

17 December 2016
7:00pm

Boxscore

Sydney Uni Flames	82–67	Dandenong Rangers
Scoring by quarter: 26–25, 19–20, 14–9, 23–13
Pts: Taylor 18; Rebs: Hamson 12; Asts: Mitchell 10		Pts: Clydesdale, Cumming 15; Rebs: Blicavs 12; Asts: Clydesdale 4

Brydens Stadium, Sydney, New South Wales
Referees: Mark Caldwell, Nicolas Fernandes, Chris Vogelsinger

17 December 2016
7:30pm

Boxscore

Melbourne Boomers	70–50	Canberra Capitals
Scoring by quarter: 11–9, 19–11, 18–10, 22–20
Pts: Garrick 11; Rebs: Garrick 7 Asts: Smart 6		Pts: Ruef, Tolo 17; Rebs: Ruef 17; Asts: Mansfield 4

State Basketball Centre, Melbourne, Victoria
Referees: Todd Spain, Jason Kelly, Sarah Carey

18 December 2016
1:00pm

Boxscore

Perth Lynx	102–52	Adelaide Lightning
Scoring by quarter: 27–16, 16–9, 33–10, 26–17
Pts: Whitcomb 26; Rebs: Hamblin, Mijović 6 Asts: Lavey 7		Pts: Planeta 17; Rebs: Maley 8 Asts: Elsworthy, Logic 3

Bendat Basketball Centre, Perth, Western Australia
Referees: Steve Diconza, Peter Houghton, Mark Grist

=== Round 12 ===
29 December 2016
7:30pm

Boxscore

Adelaide Lightning	72–89	Sydney Uni Flames
Scoring by quarter: 15–27, 20–19, 15–20, 22–23
Pts: Logic, Planeta 17; Rebs: Logic, Planeta 7 Asts: Hunter, Logic 4		Pts: Taylor 26; Rebs: Hamson, Taylor 14; Asts: Wilson 7

Adelaide Arena, Adelaide, South Australia
Referees: Nathan Durant, Vanessa Devlin, Nikki Ireland

30 December 2016
7:00pm

Boxscore

Perth Lynx	69–93	Sydney Uni Flames
Scoring by quarter: 20–31, 15–23, 24–18, 10–21
Pts: Whitcomb 22; Rebs: Lavey 9 Asts: Whitcomb 5		Pts: Mitchell 27; Rebs: Taylor 13; Asts: Taylor 8

Bendat Basketball Centre, Perth, Western Australia
Referees: Mark Grist, Steve Diconza, Adrian Diconza

31 December 2016
7:00pm

Boxscore

Townsville Fire	88–75	Melbourne Boomers
Scoring by quarter: 24–22, 32–22, 18–17, 14–14
Pts: Batkovic 18; Rebs: Batkovic 15; Asts: Batkovic, Cloud 4		Pts: Garrick 19; Rebs: Thompson 8 Asts: Kunek 4

Townsville RSL Stadium, Townsville, Queensland
Referees: Aaron Gilboy, Kylie Voevodin, Scott Brown

=== Round 13 ===
6 January 2017
7:00pm

Boxscore

Townsville Fire	93–60	Canberra Capitals
Scoring by quarter: 27–22, 29–12, 19–6, 18–20
Pts: Batkovic 19; Rebs: Batkovic 12; Asts: Cloud 8		Pts: Mansfield 16; Rebs: Ruef 12; Asts: Mansfield, Tolo 2

Townsville RSL Stadium, Townsville, Queensland
Referees: Scott Brown, Kylie Voevodin, Aaron Gilboy

7 January 2017
7:30pm

Boxscore

Melbourne Boomers	67–71	Adelaide Lightning
Scoring by quarter: 20–24, 16–16, 14–17, 17–14
Pts: Garrick, Kunek 14; Rebs: Garrick, Thompson 7 Asts: Keane 4		Pts: Roberts 22; Rebs: Planeta 15; Asts: Logic 6

Geelong Arena, Geelong, Victoria
Referees: Troy Earle, Jason Kelly, Kahli Symons

7 January 2017
7:00pm

Boxscore

Perth Lynx	108–67	Bendigo Spirit
Scoring by quarter: 30–14, 27–16, 32–15, 19–22
Pts: Whitcomb 34; Rebs: Hamblin 8 Asts: Whitcomb 6		Pts: Raincock-Ekunwe 17; Rebs: Three tied 6 Asts: Dietrick, Griffin 4

Bendat Basketball Centre, Perth, Western Australia
Referees: Steve Diconza, Mark Grist, Adrian Diconza

8 January 2017
2:00pm

Boxscore

Dandenong Rangers	73–80	Adelaide Lightning
Scoring by quarter: 15–19, 15–26, 21–16, 22–19
Pts: Blicavs 19; Rebs: Malott 8 Asts: Novosel 6		Pts: Roberts 21; Rebs: Maley 9 Asts: Hunter, Logic 4

Dandenong Stadium, Dandenong, Victoria
Referees: Raoul Kirsten, Daniel Battye, Chris Clark

8 January 2017
5:00pm

Boxscore

Sydney Uni Flames	73–76	Canberra Capitals
Scoring by quarter: 15–29, 24–13, 17–16, 17–18
Pts: Wilson 16; Rebs: Boag 8 Asts: Mitchell 8		Pts: Gaze 18; Rebs: Tolo 8 Asts: Gwathmey 5

Brydens Stadium, Sydney, New South Wales
Referees: Scott Beker, Guy Richards, Rebecca Brockway

=== Round 14 ===
12 January 2017
4:30pm

Boxscore

Adelaide Lightning	74–77	Sydney Uni Flames
Scoring by quarter: 15–20, 33–21, 14–20, 12–16
Pts: Planeta 18; Rebs: Roberts 9 Asts: Logic 10		Pts: Wilson 15; Rebs: Hamson 8 Asts: Mitchell 5

Adelaide Arena, Adelaide, South Australia

13 January 2017
7:30pm

Boxscore

Bendigo Spirit	68–71	Sydney Uni Flames
Scoring by quarter: 14–24, 18–16, 19–18, 17–13
Pts: Griffin 17; Rebs: Griffin 9 Asts: Karaitiana 4		Pts: Mitchell 25; Rebs: Taylor 10; Asts: Mitchell, Snell 5

Bendigo Stadium, Bendigo, Victoria

14 January 2017
3:00pm

Boxscore

Dandenong Rangers	73–61 (OT)	Melbourne Boomers
Scoring by quarter: 14–15, 19–22, 14–9, 9–10, Overtime: 17–5
Pts: Malott 24; Rebs: Blicavs 9 Asts: Cumming 5		Pts: Smart 18; Rebs: Thompson 9 Asts: Six tied 2

Dandenong Stadium, Dandenong, Victoria

14 January 2017
3:00pm

Boxscore

Canberra Capitals	73–67	Townsville Fire
Scoring by quarter: 17–17, 22–15, 19–18, 15–17
Pts: Tolo 17; Rebs: Tolo 8 Asts: Ruef 3		Pts: Batkovic 23; Rebs: Batkovic 12; Asts: Batkovic 5

Southern Cross Stadium, Canberra, Australian Capital Territory

=== Round 15 ===
20 January 2017
7:00pm

Boxscore

Townsville Fire	87–67	Bendigo Spirit
Scoring by quarter: 25–12, 21–22, 23–21, 18–12
Pts: Batkovic 28; Rebs: Batkovic 14; Asts: Cloud 7		Pts: Raincock-Ekunwe 15; Rebs: Raincock-Ekunwe 7 Asts: Payne, Karaitiana 3

Townsville RSL Stadium, Townsville, Queensland

21 January 2017
4:30pm

Boxscore

Adelaide Lightning	58–85	Dandenong Rangers
Scoring by quarter: 12–24, 13–25, 8–15, 25–21
Pts: Elsworthy 11; Rebs: Hodges 7 Asts: Ciabattoni 5		Pts: Cumming 22; Rebs: Kennedy 7 Asts: Blicavs 4

Adelaide Arena, Adelaide, South Australia

21 January 2017
5:00pm

Boxscore

Sydney Uni Flames	90–78	Perth Lynx
Scoring by quarter: 23–21, 19–22, 24–23, 24–12
Pts: Taylor 32; Rebs: Taylor 9 Asts: Mitchell 11		Pts: Mijovic 22; Rebs: Hamblin 9 Asts: Lavey 8

Brydens Stadium, Sydney, New South Wales
Referees: Mark Caldwell, Nico Fernandes and Guy Richards

21 January 2017
7:00pm

Boxscore

Canberra Capitals	77–63	Bendigo Spirit
Scoring by quarter: 17–24, 18–13, 21–19, 21–7
Pts: Tolo 28; Rebs: Tolo 9 Asts: Mansfield 6		Pts: Griffin 20; Rebs: Payne 8 Asts: Griffin 3

Southern Cross Stadium, Canberra, Australian Capital Territory

22 January 2017
3:00pm

Boxscore

Melbourne Boomers	79–87	Perth Lynx
Scoring by quarter: 27–23, 13–27, 17–21, 22–16
Pts: Garrick 21; Rebs: Thompson 7 Asts: Three tied 3		Pts: Whitcomb 25; Rebs: Hamblin 10; Asts: Whitcomb, Lavey 5

State Basketball Centre, Melbourne, Victoria

=== Round 16 ===
25 January 2017
7:30pm

Boxscore

Melbourne Boomers	66–78	Dandenong Rangers
Scoring by quarter: 24–25, 13–20, 16–15, 13–18
Pts: Kunek 17; Rebs: Cunningham, Ott 5 Asts: Kunek 3		Pts: Blicavs 25; Rebs: Blicavs, Cumming 6 Asts: Four tied 3

State Basketball Centre, Melbourne, Victoria

26 January 2017
3:00pm

Boxscore

Canberra Capitals	75–77	Sydney Uni Flames
Scoring by quarter: 20–16, 16–17, 13–21, 26–23
Pts: Mansfield, Tolo 16; Rebs: Tolo 11; Asts: Mansfield 8		Pts: Snell 30; Rebs: Snell 8 Asts: Mitchell 5

Southern Cross Stadium, Canberra, Australian Capital Territory

27 January 2017
7:30pm

Boxscore

Adelaide Lightning	60–80	Perth Lynx
Scoring by quarter: 18–28, 21–7, 13–24, 8–21
Pts: Hodges 25; Rebs: Roberts, Logic 8 Asts: Logic 6		Pts: Whitcomb 23; Rebs: Mijovic 9 Asts: Lavey, Butler 3

Adelaide Arena, Adelaide, South Australia

28 January 2017
7:00pm

Boxscore

Townsville Fire	75–76	Sydney Uni Flames
Scoring by quarter: 21–19, 20–16, 17–20, 17–21
Pts: Batkovic 21; Rebs: Batkovic, Garbin 7 Asts: Cloud 7		Pts: Mitchell 15; Rebs: Hamson 10; Asts: Snell 6

Townsville RSL Stadium, Townsville, Queensland

28 January 2017
7:30pm

Boxscore

Bendigo Spirit	76–69	Melbourne Boomers
Scoring by quarter: 26–18, 17–24, 18–18, 15–9
Pts: Raincock-Ekunwe 27; Rebs: Griffin 11; Asts: Dietrick 4		Pts: Three tied 15; Rebs: Thompson 9 Asts: Cole 5

Bendigo Stadium, Bendigo, Victoria

29 January 2017
2:00pm

Boxscore

Perth Lynx	87–77	Dandenong Rangers
Scoring by quarter: 31–14, 21–25, 15–26, 20–12
Pts: Whitcomb 27; Rebs: Mijovic, Humblin 8 Asts: Whitcomb 4		Pts: Novosel 20; Rebs: Blicavs, Malott 5 Asts: Novosel 5

Bendat Basketball Centre, Perth, Western Australia

=== Round 17 ===
3 February 2017
7:30pm

Boxscore

Adelaide Lightning	66–74	Canberra Capitals
Scoring by quarter: 23–18, 20–20, 12–18, 11–18
Pts: Ciabattoni 17; Rebs: Ciabattoni 9 Asts: Logic 6		Pts: Tolo 20; Rebs: Ruef 20; Asts: Mansfield 5

Adelaide Arena, Adelaide, South Australia

4 February 2017
6:30pm

Boxscore

Dandenong Rangers	78–92	Townsville Fire
Scoring by quarter: 21–23, 15–21, 27–31, 15–17
Pts: Blicavs 24; Rebs: Novosel 7 Asts: Cumming 5		Pts: Batkovic 26; Rebs: Batkovic 11; Asts: Wilson 7

Dandenong Stadium, Dandenong, Victoria

5 February 2017
2:00pm

Boxscore

Perth Lynx	84–72	Canberra Capitals
Scoring by quarter: 20–19, 21–15, 21–14, 22–24
Pts: Whitcomb 27; Rebs: Hamblin 10; Asts: Whitcomb 5		Pts: Mansfield 19; Rebs: Ruef 12; Asts: Mansfield 6

Bendat Basketball Centre, Perth, Western Australia

5 February 2017
3:00pm

Boxscore

Bendigo Spirit	77–83	Townsville Fire
Scoring by quarter: 16–23, 12–26, 27–14, 22–20
Pts: Griffin 28; Rebs: Raincock-Ekunwe 15; Asts: Dietrick 5		Pts: Batkovic 31; Rebs: Wilson 9 Asts: Wilson 6

Bendigo Stadium, Bendigo, Victoria

5 February 2017
3:00pm

Boxscore

Melbourne Boomers	67–72	Sydney Uni Flames
Scoring by quarter: 14–19, 19–14, 17–16, 17–23
Pts: Garrick 16; Rebs: Thompson 7 Asts: Keane 4		Pts: Taylor 28; Rebs: Taylor 15; Asts: Mitchell 7

State Basketball Centre, Melbourne, Victoria

=== Round 18 ===
10 February 2017
7:00pm

Boxscore

Townsville Fire	83–66	Dandenong Rangers
Scoring by quarter: 24–14, 20–15, 22–15, 17–22
Pts: Standish 22; Rebs: Batkovic 12; Asts: Wilson 7		Pts: Blicavs 12; Rebs: Blicavs 11; Asts: Four tied 3

Townsville RSL Stadium, Townsville, Queensland

10 February 2017
7:30pm

Boxscore

Adelaide Lightning	72–85	Melbourne Boomers
Scoring by quarter: 23–18, 13–14, 17–20, 19–33
Pts: Hodges 18; Rebs: Hodges 15; Asts: Ciabattoni 8		Pts: Garrick 22; Rebs: Thompson 10; Asts: Keane 5

Adelaide Arena, Adelaide, South Australia

11 February 2017
7:00pm

Boxscore

Sydney Uni Flames	81–77	Dandenong Rangers
Scoring by quarter: 20–24, 25–27, 15–15, 21–11
Pts: Mitchell 19; Rebs: Hamson 14; Asts: Snell 7		Pts: Cumming 25; Rebs: Scherf 9 Asts: Cumming 5

Brydens Stadium, Sydney, New South Wales

12 February 2017
12:00pm

Boxscore

Canberra Capitals	77–52	Bendigo Spirit
Scoring by quarter: 25–17, 18–19, 24–4, 10–12
Pts: Wehrung 18; Rebs: Ruef 12; Asts: Mansfield 6		Pts: Oliver 12; Rebs: Raincock-Ekunwe 13; Asts: Dietrick 3

Southern Cross Stadium, Canberra, Australian Capital Territory

12 February 2017
2:00pm

Boxscore

Perth Lynx	87–81 (OT)	Melbourne Boomers
Scoring by quarter: 25–21, 16–24, 21–18, 12–11, Overtime: 13–7
Pts: Whitcomb 22; Rebs: Mijović 13; Asts: Lavey 5		Pts: Keane 16; Rebs: Keane 9 Asts: Keane 9

Bendat Basketball Centre, Perth, Western Australia

=== Round 19 ===
16 February 2017
7:00pm

Boxscore

Canberra Capitals	74–76	Adelaide Lightning
Scoring by quarter: 13–24, 22–19, 16–15, 23–18
Pts: Gwathmey 16; Rebs: Ruef 11; Asts: Mansfield 5		Pts: Planeta 29; Rebs: Logic 7 Asts: Ciabattoni, Planeta 3

Southern Cross Stadium, Canberra, Australian Capital Territory

18 February 2017
6:30pm

Boxscore

Dandenong Rangers	81–59	Perth Lynx
Scoring by quarter: 21–13, 27–15, 20–17, 13–14
Pts: Blicavs 20; Rebs: Novosel 7 Asts: Clydesdale 6		Pts: Whitcomb 17; Rebs: Mijović 8 Asts: Five tied 2

Dandenong Stadium, Dandenong, Victoria

18 February 2017
7:00pm

Boxscore

Sydney Uni Flames	98–83	Adelaide Lightning
Scoring by quarter: 26–17, 21–17, 27–20, 24–29
Pts: Mitchell 17; Rebs: Taylor 7 Asts: Mitchell 6		Pts: Planeta 21; Rebs: Planeta 12; Asts: Logic 6

Brydens Stadium, Sydney, New South Wales

18 February 2017
7:00pm

Boxscore

Townsville Fire	83–90	Canberra Capitals
Scoring by quarter: 25–24, 20–24, 21–15, 17–27
Pts: Batkovic 26; Rebs: Batkovic 14; Asts: Wilson 7		Pts: Ruef 24; Rebs: Gwathmey 9 Asts: Mansfield 7

Townsville RSL Stadium, Townsville, Queensland

18 February 2017
7:30pm

Boxscore

Melbourne Boomers	79–80	Bendigo Spirit
Scoring by quarter: –, –, –, –
Pts: Garrick 21; Rebs: Thompson 5 Asts: Cole 3		Pts: Dietrick 17; Rebs: Raincock-Ekunwe 10; Asts: Griffin 6

State Basketball Centre, Melbourne, Victoria

19 February 2017
3:00pm

Boxscore

Bendigo Spirit	73–72	Perth Lynx
Scoring by quarter: 28–22, 14–20, 18–21, 13–9
Pts: Raincock-Ekunwe 17; Rebs: Griffin 9 Asts: Dietrick, Oliver 7		Pts: Whitcomb 22; Rebs: Hamblin 11; Asts: Edmondson, Lavey 5

Bendigo Stadium, Bendigo, Victoria

== Statistics ==
=== League leaders ===
Points

Name	GP	PPG
(United States) Sami Whitcomb (PER)	24	23.6
(Australia) Suzy Batkovic (TSV)	24	21.3
(Australia) Marianna Tolo (CAN)	24	18.1
(Australia) Laura Hodges (ADL)	16	17.5
(United States) Asia Taylor (SYD)	21	16.7

Rebounds

Name	GP	RPG
(United States) Mikaela Ruef (CAN)	24	11.0
(Australia) Suzy Batkovic (TSV)	24	10.6
(Australia) Marianna Tolo (CAN)	24	8.5
(Canada) Nayo Raincock-Ekunwe (BEN)	24	8.3
(United States) Jennifer Hamson (SYD)	22	8.3

Assists

Name	GP	APG
(Australia) Leilani Mitchell (SYD)	24	6.2
(United States) Samantha Logic (ADL)	24	5.3
(Australia) Lauren Mansfield (CAN)	24	5.0
(Australia) Belinda Snell (SYD)	18	4.5
(Australia) Kelly Wilson (TSV)	14	4.5

Blocks

Name	GP	BPG
(United States) Jennifer Hamson (SYD)	22	2.6
(Australia) Marianna Tolo (CAN)	24	2.4
(Canada) Ruth Hamblin (PER)	24	2.3
(United States) Colleen Planeta (ADL)	24	1.5
(Australia) Carley Mijović (PER)	24	1.5

Steals

Name	GP	SPG
(United States) Sami Whitcomb (PER)	24	2.8
(United States) Natalie Novosel (DAN)	16	1.8
(United States) Samantha Logic (ADL)	24	1.8
(Australia) Leilani Mitchell (SYD)	24	1.7
(Australia) Sara Blicavs (DAN)	24	1.6
