= Oliviu (name) =

Romanian masculine given name

- Gender: masculine

Other names
- Derived: olive tree
- Usage: Romanian
- Related names: Olívio

Oliviu is a Romanian masculine given name form of Olivio. Notable people with the name include:

- Oliviu Beldeanu (1924-1960), Romanian anti-communist activist
- Oliviu Crâznic (born 1978), Romanian writer
- Oliviu Gherman (1930-2020), Romanian physicist, politician and diplomat
- Oliviu Rusu (1919-2003), Romanian civil engineer

== See also ==
- Olivio
