= Oliwia =

Oliwia is a Polish female name, meaning Olivia. It may refer to:

- Oliwia Bałuk (born 17 May 2000) - a Polish volleyball player
- Oliwka Brazil (born 29 November 2001) - a Polish rapper and singer
- Oliwia Jabłońska (born 16 April 1997) - a Polish Paralympic swimmer competing in S10 classification events
- Oliwia Kiołbasa (born 26 April 2000) - a Polish chess player
- Oliwia Sobieszek (born 6 April 1995) - an English singer who is the lead singer for doom metal band Kroh
- Olivia Spiker (born November 24, 1981) - a Polish-German amateur boxer
- Oliwia Szmigiel - (born 4 April 2003) - a Polish para-badminton player
- Oliwia Toborek (born 11 May 2002) - a Polish amateur boxer who won a silver medal at the 2022 World Championships
- Oliwia Woś (born 15 August 1999) - a Polish professional footballer who plays as a defender for Swiss club FC Basel
- Oliwia Zalewska (born 20 January 1995) - a Polish professional pool player
