= Wensley =

Wensley may refer to:

== Placename ==
- Wensley, Derbyshire, England
- Wensley, North Yorkshire, England

== People ==
Surname

- Albert Wensley (1898-1970), English cricketer
- Frederick Porter Wensley (1865—1949), British police officer
- Olivia Wensley (born 1985), New Zealand lawyer
- Penelope Wensley (born 1946), Australian state governor and ambassador

Pseudonym

- Shapcott Wensley, pseudonym of the English author and poet Henry Shapcott Bunce (1854–1917)

Given name

- Wensley Christoph (born 1984), Surinamese soccer player
- Wensley Haydon-Baillie, English businessman
- Wensley Pithey (1914-1993), South African character actor
