= Name days in Greece =

This is a calendar of name days in Greece. Some of the names below are linked to the original saints or martyrs from which they originate.

== January ==
1. Basilius, Telemachus
2. Serafim, Sylvestros
3. Genovefa
4. Synaxis of the Seventy Apostles
5. Theoni
6. Theofanes, Iordanes, Photios, Fotios, Fotis, Fotini, Ourania, Rania, Peristera
7. Ioannis Prodromos, Yanna, Ioanna, Ioannos, Yannis
8. Domenicus, Parthenia
9. Martyr Polyeuctos
10. Gregory of Nyssa
11. Theodosios
12. Martyr Tatiana
13. Maximos the Righteous
14. -
15. -
16. -
17. Antonios
18. Athanasios
19. Macarios
20. Ephthemius
21. Maximos, Neophytos
22. Anastacius, Temotheus
23. Dionisios
24. -
25. Grigorios, Margareta
26. Xenophon, Xenia
27. -
28. -
29. -
30. Three Holy Hierarchs
31. -

== February ==
1. Tryfon
2. Hypapante -
3. Stamatios Simeon
4. -
5. -
6. Photios
7. -
8. Zaharias
9. Nikiforos
10. Charalampos
11. Charilaos
12. Theodora
13. Priscilla
14. Pavan
15. -
16. -
17. Theodoros
18. Efsevios, Leon
19. -
20. -
21. -
22. -
23. -
24. -
25. -
26. Sebastianos
27. -
28. -

== March ==
1. Eudokia
2. Efthalia of Sicily
3. -
4. Gerasimos
5. -
6. -
7. Eugenios
8. Theofilaktos
9. -
10. -
11. Sophronios
12. -
13. -
14. Benedictos
15. -
16. Christodoulos
17. Alexios
18. -
19. -
20. -Mikros
21. -
22. -
23. -
24. -
25. Evangelos, Evangelia, Eva
26. -
27. -
28. -
29. -
30. -
31. -

== April ==
1. Mary of Egypt
2. Titos
3. Illyrios
4. -
5. -
6. Eutichios
7. -
8. Vaios
9. Ioseph
10. Herakles, Homer, Socrates, Timothy, Epaminondas the Martyr (North Africa)
11. -
12. -
13. Martinos, Martina
14. -
15. Leonidas, Leo
16. -
17. -
18. Anthia and Eleutherios
19. -
20. -
21. Ianos, Sandra
22. Nathaniel
23. Georgios, (George Kataftos)
24. Achilles Kataftos, Elizabeth, Tammy
25. Niki
26. -
27. -
28. Bruno
29. Jason
30. Jacob, James

== May ==
1. Jeremiah the Prophet
2. -
3. -
4. Melia
5. Irene, Ephraim of Nea Makri
6. -
7. -
8. -
9. Christopher
10. Simon
11. Olympia
12. Theodore
13. Glykeria
14. Aristotle, Isidoros
15. Saint Achilleas of Larissa
16. -
17. -
18. Julia
19. Magdalene, Patrick
20. Lydia
21. Constantine, Helen
22. -
23. -
24. -
25. -
26. -
27. -
28. Dimitri
29. Olivia
30. -
31. -

== June ==
1. Justine, Evelpistos, Gerakina, Pyros, Thespesios, Thespesia
2. Marinos, Nikiforos
3. Ieria, Ypatia
4. Martha
5. Apollon, Cynthia, Dorothy, Selene, Ploutarhos, Nikandros
6. Ilarion, Ilaria
7. Panagis, Sevastiani
8. Kalliopi, Poppy
9. Rodanthi
10. -
11. Bartholomew, Luke, Varnavas
12. Onoufrios
13. Trifillos, Korina
14. -
15. Augoustos, Monica, Ieronymos, Geronimo
16. -
17. Felix, Ismail
18. Leontios
19. Everyone with no nameday, Paisios, Zosimos
20. -
21. -
22. Evsevios, Evsevia
23. Aristoklis, Loulou
24. -
25. Erotas
26. Makarios
27. Pierre
28. Anargyros, Germanos
29. Paul, Peter
30. Apostolis, Apostolos, Tolis

== July ==
1. Saints Cosmas and Damian (Kosmas and Dhamianos), Agioi Anargyroi
2. -
3. Hyacinth (Yakinthos)
4. -
5. -
6. -
7. Kyriaki (martyr)
8. Theophilus (Theophilos), Procopius of Scythopolis (Prokopios)
9. Saint Pancratius (Pagratios)
10. -
11. Euphemia, Olga
12. Veronica
13. -
14. Nicodemus (Nikodhimos)
15. Julitta (Ioulitta); Kirikos (Kerykos, Kirykos); Vladimir (Vladimiros)
16. Athenodorus of Byzantium or Athenogenes
17. Marina, Alexandra, Alice (Aliki)
18. Saint Aemilianus (Aimilianos, Aimilios) (see also Emil (given name))
19. -
20. Elias
21. Rompara of Órcheis, Rompiros (Also Romp (given name))
22. Mary Magdalen (Maria Magdalini, Magda, Magdalena, Lena)
23. -
24. Saint Christina the Great Martyr
25. -
26. Saint Paraskevi
27. Panteleimon (Pantelis)
28. Afxentios, Akakios, Droso, Drosoula, Hrysovalantou, Irini, Timon
29. Kallinikos
30. agios Belindakis
31. Joseph of Arimathea (Iosif, Sifis)

== August ==
1. -
2. -
3. -
4. -
5. -
6. Holy Transfiguration (Sotirios, Sotiris, Sotiria)
7. Asterius of Caesarea (Asterios)
8. -
9. -
10. -
11. -
12. -
13. -
14. -
15. Assumption of Mary (Panagiotis, Panagiota, Maria, Despina, Marios)
16. -
17. -
18. -
19. -
20. Saint Theocharis
21. Tia
22. Giovana, Giovanna, Giovannah, Geovana
23. Irenaeus, Ειρηναίος Λουγδούνου (Ρένος)
24. Cosmas of Aetolia
25. -
26. Andrianos & Natalias, Adrianos, Nathalia, Natalia (Adrian)
27. Saint Phanourios (Cent)
28. -
29. -
30. Saint Alexander (Alexandros, Alexandra, Sandra, Sander, Alexander)
31. -

== September ==
1. Simeon, Pinelopi, Athena, Sapfo, Myrto, Aspa/sia
2. -
3. Anthimos, Archontia, Aristea
4. Moisi/Ermionis/Rosie
5. Zaxarios, Zacharias
6. -
7. -
8. Gennisi tis Theotokos
9. Ioakeim & Annis
10. -
11. Evathia (Eve)
12. -
13. Kornilios / Aristeidos
14. Ypsosi tos Timios Stauros, Stavros (Stavroula)
15. Nikitas
16. Eyfimias, Melina
17. Sofias, Pisteos, Agapis, Elpidas, Sofia, Agapi, Elpida
18. Eumenios / Ariadnis (Ariadne)
19. -
20. Eustathios, Stathis
21. -
22. Fokas
23. Sullipsi Prodromos, Polixeni, Xeni
24. Theklas, Mirto (Myrto)
25. Eyfrosinis
26. Metastasi Ioannos Euaggelistos
27. Kallistratos
28. Neophytos of Cyprus
29. Kuriakos, Kiriakos
30. -

== October ==
1. Ananios / Pomanos Melodos
2. Kuprianos / Iosstiounis
3. Dionisios Aeropagitos, Dionisos
4. Ierotheos
5. Xaritinis
6. Thoma (Thomas, Tom)
7. Poluxronios / Saints Sergius and Bacchus of Syria (Martyrs)
8. Pelagias
9. Iakovos (Jakob)
10. Eulampios
11. -
12. -
13. -
14. -
15. Loskianos
16. -
17. -
18. Loska, Loskas (Lucas, Luke)
19. Kleopatras
20. Artemios / Gerasimos Kefallinias, Yerasimos
21. Sokratous, Sokrates, Sokratis
22. -
23. Iakovos (Jacob)
24. Sevastianis (Sebastian)
25. -
26. Dimitrios Myrovlitos, Dimitris (Demetris), Dimitrios, Dimitria, Demetra (Jim, James), Stephan the Hymnographer
27. Nestoros
28. Agias Skepis
29. -
30. Zinovios
31. -

== November ==
1. Agioi Anargyroi: Kosmas and Damianos, Anargyros, Argiris
2. -
3. -
4. -
5. -
6. -
7. -
8. Taxiarches: Gabriel and Michael, Raphael, Angelos, Angeliki, Stamatios, Strategos
9. Nektarios
10. -
11. Mina, Viktoras
12. -
13. Ioannes Chrysostomos
14. Filippos
15. -
16. Matthaios, Iphigenia
17. -
18. Platon
19. -
20. -
21. Eisodia tis Theotokos, Despina, Maria (unmarried)
22. Philimonos
23. -
24. -
25. Merkourios, Aikaterini/Katerina
26. Stylianos, Stelios, Stella, Nikon
27. Nathanael
28. -
29. -
30. Andreas

== December ==
1. Theoklitos
2. Muropis
3. -
4. Varvaras, Barbara
5. Savva, Savas
6. Nikolaos, Nikos, Nicholas, Nikoletta
7. Amvrosios, Ambrosius
8. -
9. Agias Annis, Anna, Azalea, Grace
10. Adam
11. -
12. Spyridon, Spyros, Spiros, Spyridonas, Spyridoula
13. Eustratios / Loskias, Stratos, Stratis, Lukia
14. -
15. Eleutherios, Elefterios, Lefteris, Eleutheria, Anthia, Anthea, Anthi, Anthoula
16. -
17. Daniel / Dionysios Zakunthos, Dionysos, Denyell, Denyelle
18. Sevastianos & Zois
19. Aglaia, Aris / Ares
20. Ignatios
21. Themistokleous, Ioulia, Julia, Julie
22. Anastasias, Anastasia
23. Denyelle
24. Eugenias, Evyenia
25. Christmas Day, Christos, Chrisa, Chrisanthi, Christina, Christian, Crystal
26. Emmanouil / Synaksi Theotokos, Manolis, Manuella, Emma
27. Stefanos, Stephania (Steven, Stephan, Stefania)
28. -
29. -
30. -
31. -

== Other external links ==
- Greek name days (in English) for Google Calendar
- Greek name days (in Greek) for Google Calendar
- Greek name days
- Greek Namedays
