= Olívia (given name) =

- Pronunciation: Slovak: [/ˈɔ.liː.vi.a/], Hungarian: [/ˈo.liː.viʲ.ɒ/], Brazilian Portuguese: [/oˈli.vi.ɐ/], European Portuguese: [/ɔˈli.vjɐ/]
- Gender: Female
- Language: Slovak, Portuguese, Hungarian
- Name day: December 3 (Hungary)

Origin
- Language: Latin
- Meaning: "Olive tree"

Other names
- Variant forms: Aliveah (English), Aliviah (English), Aliviya (American English), Aliviyah (English), Alivya (American English), Alivyah (English), Alyvia (American English), Elivia (African English), Oleevia (Scots), Olevia (American English), Òlëwiô ( Kashubian), Olibhia (Irish), Oliivia (Estonian), Olivea (American English), Ólivía (Icelandic), Olīvia (Latvian), Oliviah (English), Olīvija (Latvian), Olivija (Lithuanian, Slovene, Croatian), Olivina (Faroese), Oliviyah (American English), Olivvia (Greek), Olivya (Russian, English), Oliwa (Hawaiian), Oliwia (Polish), Oliviya (Russian, Ukrainian), Ollivia (English), Olyvea (American English), Olyvia (Greek), Olyviah (American English), Olyvya (American English), Ouliva (Asturian)
- Anglicisation: Olivia

Olívia is a Portuguese, Slovak and Hungarian feminine given name form of Olivia. Notable people with the name include:

- Olívia Araújo (born 1967), Brazilian actress
- Olívia Byington (born 1958), Brazilian singer
- Olívia Hime (born 1943), Brazilian singer and lyricist
- Olívia Kamper (born 1985), former Hungarian handballer
- Olívia Mossóczy (1936-2017), simply known as Lívia Mossóczy, Hungarian table tennis player
- Olívia Neves de Oliveira (born 1969), simply known as Olivia del Rio, Brazilian pornographic actress
- Olívia de Oliveira (born 1962), Brazilian architect
- Olívia Ortiz (born 1987), Portuguese actress
- Olívia Pineschi (born 1938), Brazilian actress
- Olívia Guedes Penteado (1872-1934), Brazilian art patron and philanthropist
- Olívia Santana (born 1967), Brazilian politician, activist, and teacher
- Olívia Schubert (born 1970s), Hungarian historian
- Olívia Soares da Silveira (19th century), Portuguese poet
- Olívia Szokolay (1902-1980), stage name as Olly Szokolay, Hungarian actress
- Olívia Torres (born 1994), Brazilian actress and singer
- Olívia Velez (1951-2021), Hungarian actress
