= Olívio =

- Pronunciation: Brazilian Portuguese: [/oˈli.vi.u/], European Portuguese pronunciation: [/ɔˈli.vju/]
- Gender: Male
- Language: Portuguese

Origin
- Language: Latin
- Meaning: "Olive tree"

Other names
- Variant forms: Olivio, Oliviu

Olívio is a Portuguese masculine given name form of Olivio.

== People with the given name "Olívio" include ==
- Olívio Câmara (1884-1957), Brazilian jurist
- Olívio da Rosa (born 1986) known as Ivo, Brazilian footballer
- Olívio Henrique da Silva Fortes (1937-1998) known as Lilico, Brazilian actor, comedian and singer
- Olívio Januário de Amorim (1888-1937), Brazilian politician
- Olívio Dutra (born 1941), Brazilian politician
- Olívio Montenegro (1896-1962), Brazilian writer and literary critic
- Olívio Aurélio Fazza (1925–2008), Brazilian Bishop of the Roman Catholic Church
- Olívio Fortunato Esperança Quilumbo (born 1982), Angolan politician
- Olívio Nóbrega (died 1993), Brazilian politician
- Olívio Freitas, East Timorese civil servant
- Olívio Jekupé (born 1965), Brazilian writer
- Olívio Pires Pitta (born 1954) known as Pitta, Brazilian footballer
- Olívio Tomé (born 2006), Portuguese footballer
