= Chante Black =

American basketball player (born 1985)

Personal information
- Born: November 12, 1985 (age 41) Austin, Texas, U.S.
- Listed height: 6 ft 5 in (1.96 m)
- Listed weight: 188 lb (85 kg)

Career information
- High school: East Forsyth (Kernersville, North Carolina)
- College: Duke (2004–2009)
- WNBA draft: 2009: 1st round, 10th overall pick
- Drafted by: Connecticut Sun
- Position: Center

Career history
- 2009: Connecticut Sun
- 2010, 2012: Tulsa Shock
- 2013: San Antonio Silver Stars
- 2016: Melbourne Boomers

Career highlights
- All-American – USBWA (2009); Third-team All-American – AP (2009); ACC Defensive Player of the Year (2009); First-team All-ACC (2009); ACC All-Defensive Team (2009); McDonald's All-American (2004); North Carolina Miss Basketball (2004)
- Stats at WNBA.com
- Stats at Basketball Reference

Chante L’amour Black (born November 12, 1985) is an American professional basketball player. She most recently played for the San Antonio Silver Stars of the WNBA before playing for the Melbourne Boomers of Australia's Women's National Basketball League.

== High school career ==
Born in Austin, Texas, Black played girls' basketball for East Forsyth High School in Kernersville, North Carolina, where she was named a WBCA All-American.

Black was a 2003 USA Youth Development Festival South Team member. In November 2003, Black was rated as the No.13 prospect in the country according to recruitment rankings by All Game Sports. She participated in the 2004 WBCA High School All-America Game where she scored three points.

As a senior at East Forsyth, she averaged 19.8 points, 16.3 rebounds, 4.8 blocks and 4.2 assists.

In 2004, she was honored with the Winston-Salem Journal’s Mary Garber Award, given annually to the top female high school player in northwest North Carolina. She was also selected as the Gatorade North Carolina Player of the Year in 2004.

== College career ==
Black played for Duke University Women's Basketball. She was just the third player in Atlantic Coast Conference history to collect at least 1,400 points, 900 rebounds and 250 blocked shots in a career.

During her freshman year at Duke, she started the first two games of the season before injuring her ankle and missing two contests. She earned ACC Rookie of the Week in February 2005 after leading Duke to a 60-49 victory.

During her sophomore year at Duke, she saw action in 34 contests while starting 12 games.

She was redshirted the entire 2006-2007 season due to a knee injury she suffered in preseason practice.

As a junior, she started all 35 games. She led Duke to the NCAA Sweet 16 as a junior. She also earned Associated Press Honorable Mention All-America honors, becoming the seventh Blue Devil in history to be named to the first, second or third team by the Associated Press. She was also named to the John R. Wooden Award top 20 and Naismith top 30 lists for National Player of the Year.

As a senior, she started in all 33 games. She led the NCAA Tournament second round as a senior.

== WNBA career ==
Black was one of 15 players invited to the 2009 WNBA Draft. During the 2009 WNBA draft, Black became the sixth Duke University Blue Devil to be selected in the first round. As of April 2009, Duke had 11 players selected in the WNBA Draft in school history.

Black was selected the first round of the 2009 WNBA draft (10th overall) by the Connecticut Sun.

The Tulsa Shock acquired Black from the Connecticut Sun during the 2010 WNBA draft. In 2010, Chante Black started 23 games. Black spent the 2011 season on injured reserve due to a back injury.

== International career ==
Black has played internationally in Turkey, Israel, Italy, Australia, and China.

In 2014, Black played basketball professionally in Italy. She was a center for the Umbertide team in Italy's A2 league.

Black began playing for the Melbourne Boomers in 2016. Black was later released by the Boomers, with former Canadian national basketball representative Kalisha Keane replacing her in the lineup.

== Personal life ==
Chante Black is the daughter of Mazie Black, who was in the U.S. Army during Desert Storm. Mazie played basketball in high school, college and on the Army intramural team. For two years between playing for the Silver Stars and the Boomers, Chante cared for her mother Mazie as she underwent chemotherapy and stem cell therapy for non-Hodgkin lymphoma.

Growing up, Chante also played some volleyball and softball.

== Career statistics ==
Legend
GP	Games played	GS	Games started	MPG	Minutes per game	RPG	Rebounds per game
APG	Assists per game	SPG	Steals per game	BPG	Blocks per game	PPG	Points per game
TO	Turnovers per game	FG%	Field-goal percentage	3P%	3-point field-goal percentage	FT%	Free-throw percentage
**Bold**	Career best	°	League leader

=== WNBA ===
==== Regular season ====
Year	Team	GP	GS	MPG	FG%	3P%	FT%	RPG	APG	SPG	BPG	TO	PPG
2009	Connecticut	33	8	13.0	38.0	0.0	62.8	3.2	0.2	0.4	0.8	**0.8**	2.9
2010	Tulsa	**34**	**23**	**20.9**	**53.7**	0.0	34.7	**6.5**	**0.6**	**0.5**	**1.6**	1.3	**5.2**
2011	Did not play (injury—back)												
2012	Tulsa	29	13	12.6	50.0	0.0	**68.8**	2.7	0.3	**0.5**	0.6	**0.8**	3.2
2013	San Antonio	1	0	10.0	50.0	0.0	0.0	2.0	0.0	0.0	1.0	2.0	2.0
Career	4 years, 3 teams	97	44	15.6	48.2	0.0	53.2	4.2	0.4	0.5	1.0	1.0	3.8

=== College ===
Legend
GP	Games played	GS	Games started	MPG	Minutes per game
FG%	Field goal percentage	3P%	3-point field goal percentage	FT%	Free throw percentage
RPG	Rebounds per game	APG	Assists per game	SPG	Steals per game
BPG	Blocks per game	PPG	Points per game	**Bold**	Career high

Year	Team	GP	Points	FG%	3P%	FT%	RPG	APG	SPG	BPG	PPG
2004-05	Duke	34	210	52.7	-	51.4	7.6	1.1	0.8	1.4	6.2
2005-06	Duke	34	267	**54.0**	-	58.3	6.1	0.6	0.8	1.9	7.9
2007-08	Duke	**35**	**494**	52.5	-	**77.8**	7.1	1.4	1.4	**2.3**	14.1
2008-09	Duke	33	467	48.6	-	72.5	**8.4**	**1.5**	1.4	2.1	**14.2**
Career	Duke	136	1438	51.5	0.0	68.3	7.3	1.2	1.1	1.9	10.6
