= Kalisha Keane =

Canadian basketball player (born 1989)

No. 32 – Melbourne Boomers
- Position: Forward
- League: WNBL

Personal information
- Born: February 3, 1989 (age 37) Scarborough, Ontario, Canada
- Listed height: 6 ft 1 in (1.85 m)

Career information
- High school: Westdale (Hamilton, Ontario)
- College: Michigan State (2007–2011)
- WNBA draft: 2011: undrafted
- Playing career: 2011–present

Career history
- 2011–2012: ŽKK Gospić
- 2012: Elitzur Holon
- 2014–2015: Elitzur Netanya
- 2015: Antalya'nın Yıldızları
- 2015–2016: TED Ankara Kolejliler
- 2016–2017: Melbourne Boomers

Career highlights
- Big Ten co-Player of the Year (2011)
Medals
Women's basketball
Representing Canada
FIBA Americas Championship
Silver medal – second place	2013 Mexico	Team
Bronze medal – third place	2011 Colombia	Team

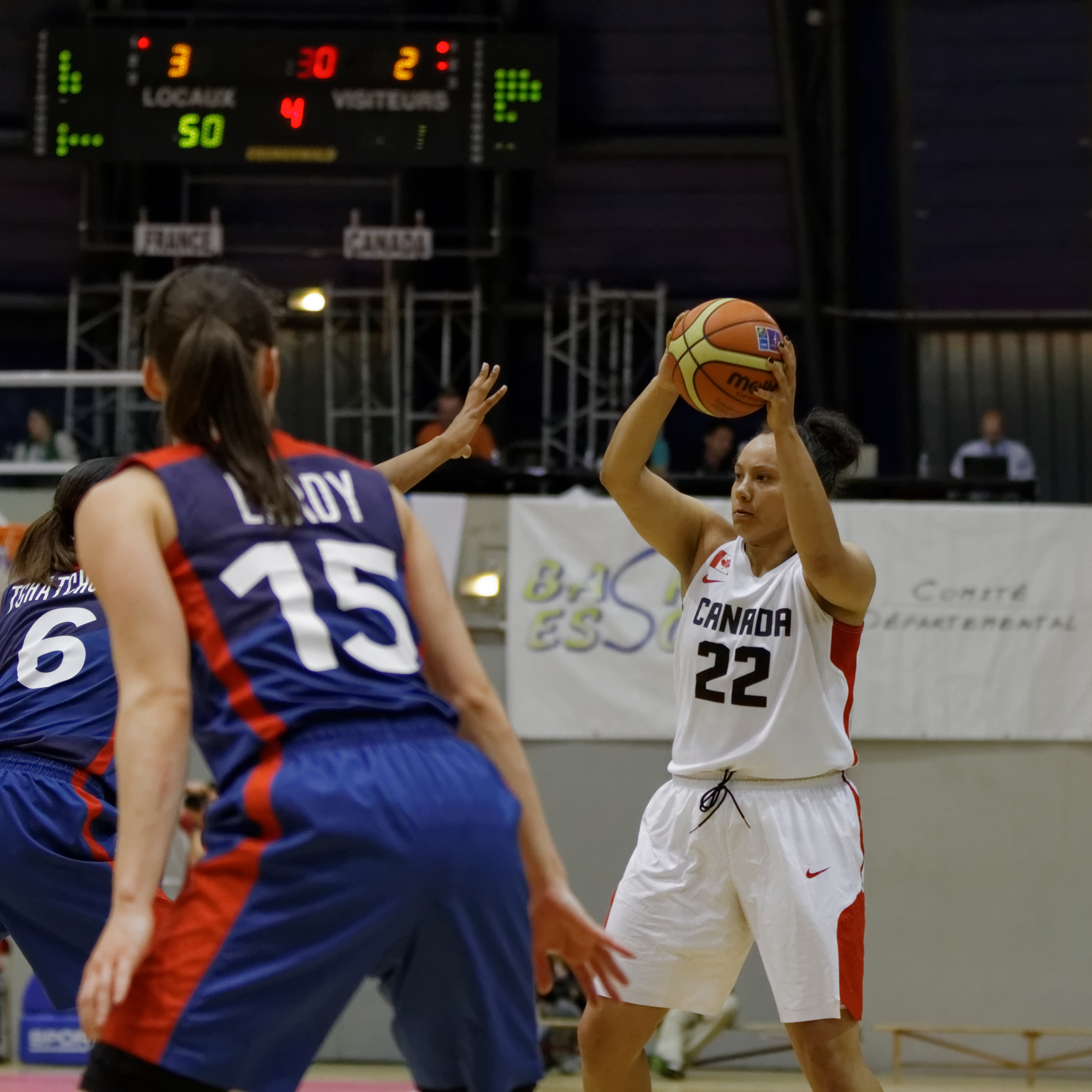
Kalisha Kane playing for team Canada against France at Euro Essonne, 2013

Kalisha Keane (born February 3, 1989) is a Canadian professional basketball player. She currently plays for the Melbourne Boomers in Australia's WNBL.

== Career ==
=== College ===
In college, Keane attended Michigan State University in East Lansing, Michigan for the Spartans. She participated in NCAA Division I, as a part of the Big Ten Conference. She was also named to the Kodak All-American Regional Team while also being the Big Ten Conference Player of the Year her senior year.

=== Michigan State statistics ===
Legend
GP	Games played	GS	Games started	MPG	Minutes per game
FG%	Field goal percentage	3P%	3-point field goal percentage	FT%	Free throw percentage
RPG	Rebounds per game	APG	Assists per game	SPG	Steals per game
BPG	Blocks per game	PPG	Points per game	**Bold**	Career high

Year	Team	GP	Points	FG%	3P%	FT%	RPG	APG	SPG	BPG	PPG
2007-08	Michigan State	**37**	460	40.4%	28.3%	84.1%	**5.9**	1.6	1.8	0.2	12.4
2008-09	Michigan State	33	247	38.8%	28.9%	**88.2%**	3.3	2.4	1.7	0.4	7.5
2009-10	Michigan State	33	315	37.9%	34.5%	69.5%	3.9	**2.5**	1.7	0.3	9.5
2010-11	Michigan State	33	**531**	**43.8%**	**36.0%**	74.7%	5.0	2.3	**2.4**	**0.5**	**16.1**
Career		136	1553	40.7%	32.7%	79.1%	4.6	2.2	1.9	0.3	11.4

=== Europe ===
After college, Keane headed to Europe and signed with ŽKK Gospić in Croatia's A-1 Liga Žene. Towards the end of the season, she signed with Elitzur Holon in Israel's league. In January 2014, she returned to Israel, with Elitzur Netanya for two seasons. She then joined Antalya'nın Yıldızları in TKB2L. She returned to Turkey for the 2014–15 TKB2L season, this time with TED Ankara.

=== Australia ===
In November 2016, Keane signed with the Melbourne Boomers in Australia for the 2016–17 WNBL season. She was signed after the Boomers parted ways with their previous import, Chante Black.

== National team ==
After a successful international career at Youth Level, Keane made her national team debut as a member of the team for the 2011 FIBA Americas Championship for Women in Colombia. She once again represented Canada at the 2013 FIBA Americas Championship for Women, in Mexico.
