= Balaklava High School =

Location
- 14 Gwy Terrace, Balaklava SA 5461; South Australia; Australia; 34.1544°S 138.41726°E

Information
- Type: Public, co-educational, secondary, day school (Years 7–12)
- Motto: Excel today to challenge the future
- Principal: Sonia Pringle
- Enrolment: 416
- Campus: Suburban
- Colours: Blue, white
- Website: www.balakhs.sa.edu.au

Balaklava High School is a country high school of around 300 students ranging from years 7 to 12. The school has around 30 teachers. It is located in Balaklava, in the Adelaide Plains in South Australia, Australia.

The school has a strong emphasis on Vocational Education and Industry and training partnership programs such as VET, Agriculture, Performing Arts, and an Engineering Pathways programs.

== Facilities ==
Balaklava High School has facilities for its students to use, including:

- Agricultural land and livestock
- Art facilities
- Commercial cookery facilities
- Community resource centre
- Two computer laboratories
- Gym
- 2 Ovals
- Performing arts facilities
- Technology Studies areas
- Weights room
- Performing arts building and canteen (built in 2017)
