= Nayo Raincock-Ekunwe =

Canadian basketball player (born 1991)

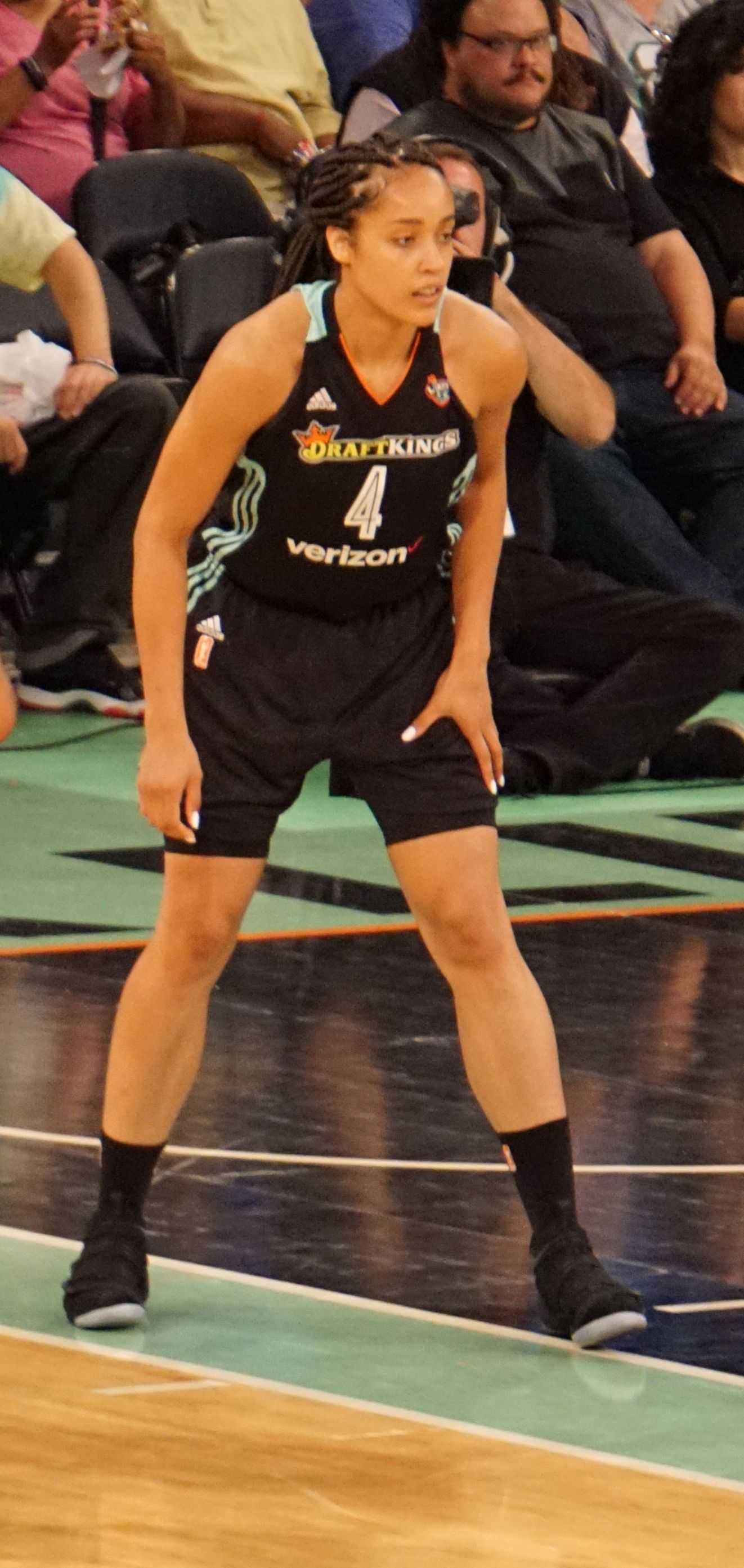

Personal information
- Born: August 29, 1991 (age 35) Toronto, Ontario, Canada
- Listed height: 6 ft 2 in (1.88 m)
- Listed weight: 165 lb (75 kg)

Career information
- High school: Kalamalka Secondary School (Vernon, British Columbia)
- College: Simon Fraser (2009–2013)
- WNBA draft: 2013: undrafted
- Playing career: 2013–present
- Position: Forward

Career history
- 2013–2014: Pully
- 2014–2015: Donau-Ries
- 2015–2016: Wasserburg
- 2016–2017: Bendigo Spirit
- 2017, 2019: New York Liberty
- 2017–2018: Rezé-Nantes Basket 44
- 2018–present: CJM Bourges Basket

Career highlights
- DBBL champion (2016); Swiss LNA First Team (2014); Swiss LNA All-Imports Team (2014); Swiss LNA Defensive Player of the Year (2014); Swiss LNA Center of the Year (2014)
- Stats at Basketball Reference
Medals
Women's basketball
Representing Canada
FIBA AmeriCup
Gold medal – first place	2015 Canada
Silver medal – second place	2019 Puerto Rico
Pan American Games
Gold medal – first place	2015 Canada	Team

Nayo Raincock-Ekunwe (born August 29, 1991) is a Canadian professional basketball player who is currently a free agent.

== Career ==
=== College ===
In college, Raincock-Ekunwe attended Simon Fraser University (SFU) in British Columbia. During her final three years with SFU, she competed in NCAA Division II, where she consistently averaged 18 points a game.

=== Europe ===
After college, Raincock-Ekunwe headed to Europe and signed with Pully Basket in the Swiss LNA. She had a successful season, receiving several awards. The following year, she signed with Donau-Ries in the German Damen-Basketball-Bundesliga for the 2014–15 season. After one season with the team, she transferred to Wasserburg, where she played a key role in leading the team to the German title.

After concluding her Australian season with Bendigo, Raincock-Ekunwe was signed by Flammes Carolos Basket Ardennes in Charleville-Mézières for the remainder of the 2017 season, playing in just five games. Raincock-Ekunwe returned to France's Ligue Féminine de Basketball for the 2017–18 season, after signing with Rezé-Nantes Basket 44. After the FIBA 2018 World Cup ended, she returned to France to play for Tango Bourges Basket in the 2018-19 season.

=== Australia ===
Raincock-Ekunwe signed with the Bendigo Spirit in Australia for the 2016–17 Women's National Basketball League season. The Spirit finished in 6th position for the season and did not qualify for the 2017 WNBL Finals. Raincock-Ekunwe was Player of the Week twice and named to the Team of the Week on five occasions.

=== WNBA ===
Raincock-Ekunwe was signed by the New York Liberty for the preseason camp, heading into the 2017 WNBA season. She made her preseason debut on May 2, 2017.

Raincock-Ekunwe decided not to join the New York Liberty for their 2020 and 2021 seasons, opting to play focus on playing for Team Canada in the Tokyo Olympics. She has stated that she has kept in contact with Liberty team who understand her desires of playing in the Olympics and they are eager for her return.

== National team ==
Raincock-Ekunwe made her national team debut as a member of the 2011 Development Women's National Team that participated in the 2011 Summer Universiade. In 2013, she moved to the Senior Women's national team and began participating in more exhibition matches. In 2015, Raincock-Ekunwe was a core member of one of the most successful years for the Canadian national team in recent years. She helped bring home their first Pan American Games gold medal with a win over the USA. She then also participated at the 2015 FIBA Oceania Women's Championship on home soil and helped the team take home the title and secure their place at the 2016 Summer Olympics. In September 2018, she participated at the FIBA World Cup in Tenerife, Spain. Canada ended in 7th place, with Nayo averaging 8.2 points and 6.5 rebounds in 25 minutes on average. In July 2021, she participated in the 2021 Summer Olympics in Tokyo, Japan.

== WNBA career statistics ==
Legend
GP	Games played	GS	Games started	MPG	Minutes per game	RPG	Rebounds per game
APG	Assists per game	SPG	Steals per game	BPG	Blocks per game	PPG	Points per game
TO	Turnovers per game	FG%	Field-goal percentage	3P%	3-point field-goal percentage	FT%	Free-throw percentage
**Bold**	Career best	°	League leader

=== Regular season ===
WNBA regular season statistics
Year	Team	GP	GS	MPG	FG%	3P%	FT%	RPG	APG	SPG	BPG	TO	PPG
2017	New York	32	2	9.2	.526	.000	.590	1.8	0.3	0.2	0.0	0.5	3.7
2019	New York	28	1	13.1	.544	.333	.640	2.8	0.4	0.3	0.1	0.8	3.7

=== Playoffs ===
WNBA playoff statistics
Year	Team	GP	GS	MPG	FG%	3P%	FT%	RPG	APG	SPG	BPG	TO	PPG
2017	New York	1	0	11.4	1.000	N/A	N/A	1.0	0.0	0.0	0.0	0.0	6.0
