= Olivia Levicki =

Australian basketball player

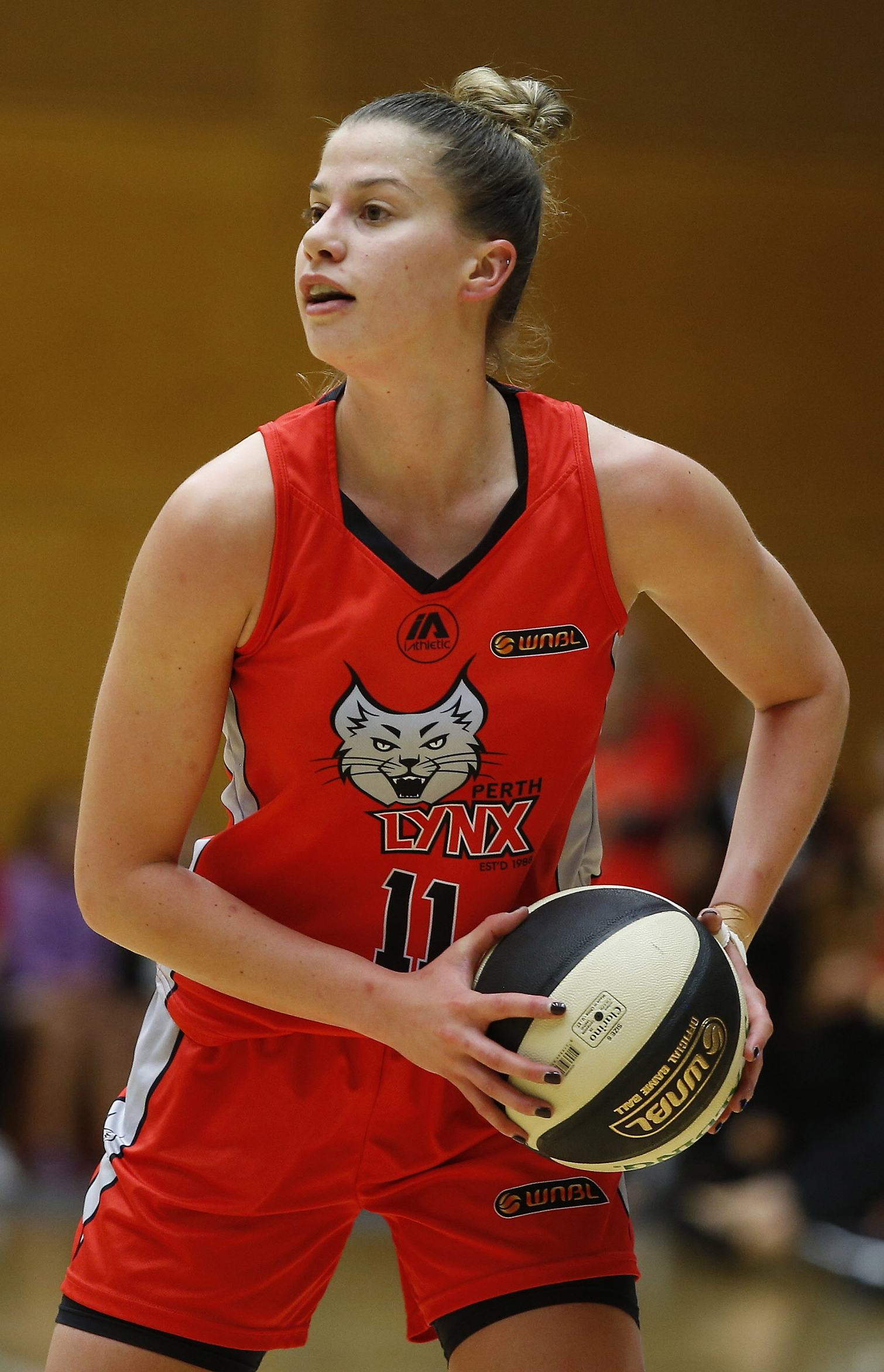
- Levicki with the Perth Lynx in 2017

Personal information
- Born: 20 January 1993 (age 33) Balaklava, South Australia, Australia
- Listed height: 188 cm (6 ft 2 in)

Career information
- High school: Balaklava (Balaklava, South Australia)
- Playing career: 2009–present
- Position: Forward

Career history
- 2009–2012: Australian Institute of Sport
- 2012–2013: Forestville Eagles
- 2012–2014: Townsville Fire
- 2014: Brisbane Spartans
- 2014–2017: Melbourne Boomers
- 2015: Ballarat Rush
- 2016–2018: Forestville Eagles
- 2017–2018: Perth Lynx
- 2021–2022: South Adelaide Panthers
- 2025: West Adelaide Bearcats

Career highlights
- SEABL champion (2014); NBL1 Central Lorraine Eiler Medallist (2025); Premier League Halls Medallist (2016); Premier League MVP (2016); 6× Premier League / NBL1 Central All-Star Five (2012, 2013, 2016–2018,2021, 2025)
Medals
Representing Australia
Basketball
World University Games
Bronze medal – third place	2013 Kazan	Team
FIBA U-16 Oceania Championship
Gold medal – first place	2009 Australia	Team

Olivia Jay Levicki (née Thompson; born 20 January 1993) is an Australian basketball player and former Australian rules footballer. She played in the Women's National Basketball League (WNBL) between 2009 and 2018. In 2022, she switched codes and joined the Port Adelaide Football Club in the AFL Women's (AFLW) competition. She returned to basketball in 2025.

== Basketball career ==
=== WNBL ===
Levicki began her professional career in 2009, for the Australian Institute of Sport. In 2012, she signed with the Townsville Fire. During her time there, she played in two consecutive WNBL Grand Finals, falling short on both occasions. In 2014, she signed with the Melbourne Boomers. In 2016, Levicki re-signed with the Boomers for a third season.

On 1 June 2017, Levicki signed with the Perth Lynx for the 2017–18 WNBL season.

=== State League ===
In 2012 and 2013, Levicki played for her junior association, the Forestville Eagles, in the Premier League during the WNBL off-seasons. In 2014, she joined the Brisbane Spartans and helped the team win the SEABL championship. After a season with the Ballarat Rush in 2015, she returned to the Forestville Eagles where she played in 2016, 2017 and 2018. Levicki was named the fairest and most brilliant player of the 2016 Premier League season, with her first Halls Medal success making her the club's first winner since 1998. She made it a clean sweep, also being named the Premier League's MVP and selected into the All-Star Five. In 2018, Levicki was named to the Premier League All-Star Five for the fifth time.

In 2021 and 2022, Levicki played in the NBL1 Central for the South Adelaide Panthers.

In 2025, Levicki joined the West Adelaide Bearcats in the NBL1 Central and won the Lorraine Eiler Medal and earned All-Star Five honours.

=== National team ===
Levicki made her national team debut at the 2009 FIBA Oceania Under-16 Championship in Brisbane, where she took home gold and secured Australia's place at the inaugural Under-17 World Championship the following year. Levicki would go on to represent Australia at the FIBA World Championship in France where Australia placed seventh. She also represented Australia at both the 2013 and 2015 Universiades in Kazan, Russia and Gwangju, South Korea respectively.

== Australian rules football career ==
Olivia Levicki

Personal information
- Draft: Rookie signing 2022: Port Adelaide
- Debut: Port Adelaide

Club information
- Current club: Port Adelaide
- Number: 18

Playing career^{1}
Years	Club	Games (Goals)
S7 (2022)–2024	Port Adelaide	13 (2)
- ^{1} Playing statistics correct to the end of the 2023 season.

=== Port Adelaide Football Club ===
In June 2022, Levicki signed with Port Adelaide as a rookie signing. After she was spotted playing basketball for South Adelaide, Levicki was scouted by Erin Phillips, who contacted her via Instagram, asking if she was interested in trying Australian rules football. She retired at the end of the 2024 season after playing 25 games.

== Personal life ==
In 2022, Levicki married former SANFL player Patrick Levicki.
