= Olivia Ahn =

British medical doctor

- Education: Imperial College London
- Website: wearefluus.com

Olivia Ahn is a British medical doctor, innovator, and founder of Fluus. Fluus developed the world's first flushable sanitary pad, which launched in 2023. She is the winner of the Mayor of London's Entrepreneur Competition and the WE Innovate Program.

== Education ==
Ahn studied medicine at the Imperial College London. She became angry at the feminine hygiene market and more concerned by environmental issues. Frustrated by the impact of sanitary pads on the environment, she founded Planera during her final year of medical school. She competed in entrepreneurial competitions at Imperial College London, securing financial support, mentorship, and sponsors. Ahn has said that her biggest advice to budding entrepreneurs is to do consumer testing and validation: extensive in-house testing proved insufficient.

== Fluus ==
Every day, Europe sends 535 tonnes of sanitary pad plastic to landfill or incinerators. Ahn developed a flushable sanitary pad that can be used and disposed of sustainably. The sanitary pad is certified flushable, 100% biodegradable, and has the same environmental impact as toilet paper. She achieved "certified flushable" status by working with the Water Research Centre.

The pads launched in 2023, and take inspiration from hydrophobic surfaces in plants to direct water into a highly absorbent core. The materials are plant-based, and include natural fibres, a biopolymer barrier, and non-toxic, tree-sap based adhesive.

== Awards and honours ==
- 2017 Althea-Imperial Programme Winner
- 2018 Advanced Hackspace Grant
- 2018 Mayor of London Entrepreneur Competition
