= Olivia Nordgren =

Swedish politician (1880–1969)

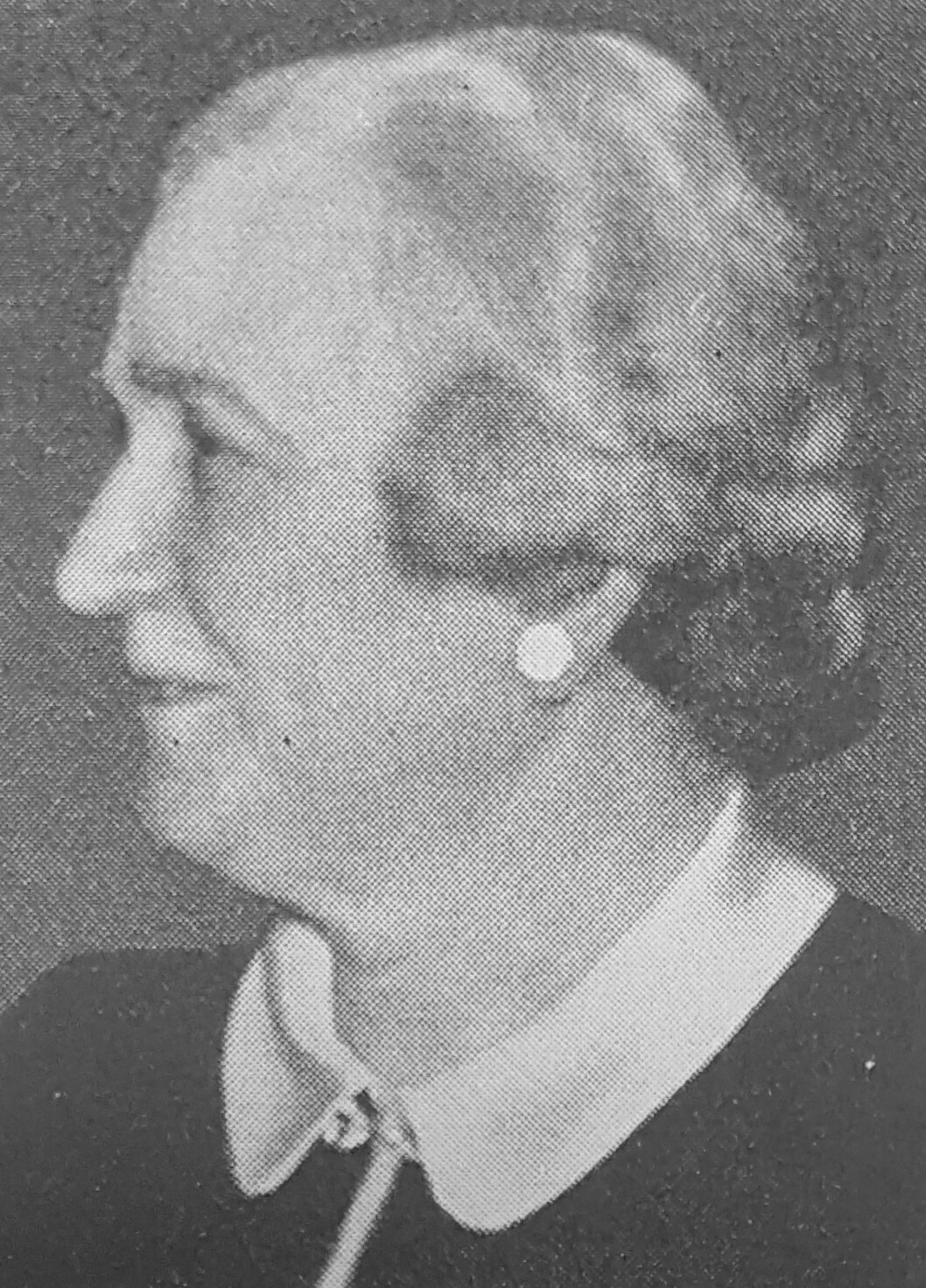

MP of the Andra kammaren of the Riksdag
- In office 1925–1952

member of the City Council of Trelleborg in Trelleborg
- In office 1915–1934

Personal details
- Born: 27 February 1880 Gislöv
- Died: 7 June 1969 (aged 89)
- Party: Social Democrats
- Awards: Illis Quorum

Olivia Lovisa Nordgren (née Larsdotter; 27 February 1880 – 7 June 1969) was a Swedish politician of the Social Democrats. She is known as one of the key figures of the Social Democratic struggle against poverty in Sweden in the 1930s.

== Life ==
Olivia Nordgren was born in Gislöv in Skåne to the farmer Lars Jönsson and Ingrid Olsdotter Hallberg. Between 1894 and 1911 she worked at the newspaper Trelleborgs Allehanda in Trelleborg, first as an apprentice typographer and then as a typographer. In 1908, she married Seth Nordgren, editor of the Social Democratic local newspaper Arbetet. She had four children.

=== Political career ===
Nordgren became a member of the Swedish Social Democratic Party in 1909. She was a board member of the Typographer's Trade Union in Trelleborg 1908–1922, chairman of the Trelleborg Social Democratic Women's Club, member of the party board of the Swedish Social Democratic Party in 1924–1952, member of the City Council of Trelleborg in Trelleborg 1915–1934, and MP of the Andra kammaren of the Riksdag in 1925–1952.

Nordgren was elected to the City Council of Trelleborg in 1915, which was possible since women, while deprived of national suffrage, did have local suffrage and was made eligible in communal councils in 1910. She unsuccessfully ran for Member of Parliament in the 1921 Swedish general election, the first election after women's national suffrage, but she did so reluctantly, because her youngest daughter was still very young. The second time she participated in an election, in 1925, she won.

As an MP, Nordgren firmly defended a married woman's right to work. This was an issue which was often debated in Parliament during the Depression, when married women were expected to be supported by their husbands and leave the work to men with a family to support, and to unmarried women who had no man to support them. Nordgren firmly and successfully refused any suggestion made to limit a woman's right to work depending on whether or not she was married.

Aside from this issue, Nordgren did not regard herself as a representative for women and did not focus on women's rights, but on social welfare, an issue for which she has become known. She was appointed to numerous Parliamentary and governmental committees in social issues. Among them were the Retirement Insurance Committee of 1928, the Domestic Maids' Committee of 1932 and 1935. She engaged in several issues within health care, the living conditions of the elderly, the situation of domestic maids. She was a board member of the Food Commission during World War II. She was particularly interested in the question of retirement funds and pensions, and participated in several committees for ensuring a more favorable and secure situation for the elderly, to ensure a more equal treatment for women in the retirement issue, and for children. She was one of the main figures behind the public widow's pension.

While working with these issues, she also contributed to raising the awareness of living conditions in Sweden by participating in public debate and publishing the investigations she made.

Nordgren had a good working relationship with Per Albin Hansson, who once stated, that if he was ever to appoint a woman to the position of Cabinet Minister, "then it would be Olivia." In the end, however, she was never appointed to the cabinet.

== Recognition ==
In 1945, she was awarded the Illis Quorum in recognition for her work to reduce poverty.
