= Oliwia Sobieszek =

English singer (born 1995)

Oliwia Sobieszek (born 6 April 1995) is an English singer. She is the lead singer for doom metal band Kroh.

== Personal life and education ==
Sobieszek was born in Birmingham, England. She attended New College in Wellington, Shropshire, where she studied Music Performance, Psychology, Sociology, Polish and an Extended Project Qualification.

== Career ==
Sobieszek joined Kroh as their lead vocalist in 2015 after answering an advertisement from Paul Kenney. Following her addition to the band, Kroh released the album Precious Bones. Kroh later released Living Water in 2015 which Sobieszek wrote the lyrics for. Sobieszek, along with Kenney, wrote the entire 9 track album and mixed the final outcome. Sobieszek recently played the O2 Academy in Sheffield stage for HRH Doom vs Stoner.
