= Olivio (given name) =

Masculine given name

- Gender: masculine

Other names
- Derived: olive tree
- Usage: Galician, Italian
- Related names: Olivia

Olivio is a masculine given name; feminine form: Olivia.

Notable people with the name include:

- Olivio Gomes (1992-2020), victim of French police violence
- Olivio Kocsis-Cake (born 1980), Hungarian politician
- Olivio Lacerda, Mexican footballer
- Olivio Mancini (1928-2012), Italian politician
- Olivio Ordoñez (also known as Oli), member of Bigflo & Oli, (born 1996), French rapper
- Olivio Sòzzi (1690-1765), Italian painter

== Fictional characters ==
- Olivio Santos Salinas, a character in the telenovela series La mujer prohibida
