= Olivia Wensley =

New Zealand #MeToo advocate and lawyer

- Born: 25 April 1985 (age 41); New Zealand
- Education: Bachelor of Laws
- Alma mater: University of Canterbury, University of Waikato
- Known for: MeToo Activism

Olivia Wensley (born 25 April 1985) is a CEO and former lawyer and New Zealand #MeToo advocate. She was the Chief Executive of Startup Queenstown Lakes from 2020-22. She has been credited for making important efforts in highlighting the working conditions and harassment young legal practitioners can face as lawyers in New Zealand.

== Biography ==
Wensley studied law at the University of Canterbury and the University of Waikato, and worked as a lawyer in New Zealand, Australia and Singapore.

On 28 February 2018, Wensley published a piece on LinkedIn titled We Need to Talk About Law's Dirty Little Secret, which was re-published by media outlet Stuff. The article described sexual harassment Wensley had experienced at law firms, and went viral and attracted international media attention. In speaking out, Wensley claims to have helped uncover other women's stories of rape, assault and harassment in the legal profession.

Wensley has been a vocal critic of the New Zealand Law Society's handling of the Russell McVeagh scandal, where it has been alleged that multiple interns were sexually assaulted and harassed during the summer of 2016/2017 – causing national outrage. Wensley has called for stronger sanctions against sexual offenders in the legal profession.

In March 2018, Wensley was one of many stakeholders to meet with the New Zealand Minister of Justice, Andrew Little who reconfirmed his commitment to holding the legal profession to account over sexual harassment and bullying in the workplace.

Wensley was one of 488 nominees for 2019 New Zealander of the Year.

== Political career ==
Wensley contested the mayor of Queenstown-Lakes position in the 2022 New Zealand local elections in a mayoral race that was marred by dirty politics aimed at Wensley by parties associated with eventual Mayor Glyn Lewers and another mayoral candidate Jon Mitchell. Wensley would go onto place third, receiving 2,531 of 12,272 votes cast. in the mayoralty race.

Wensley's personal business interests in property development. Advocates for Lewers made repeated attempts to link a proposed rates-rise with Wensley due to her father-in-law. Opposing candidates Glyn Lewers and Jon Mitchell said that Wensley would have to recuse herself from key council decisions if she were to be elected because of conflicts of interest stemming from these matters. During the election campaign Wensley denied these claims and made registered complaints to the electoral officer and stated her intention to sue those who made them for defamation, but after the election said it was "not worth the energy".
