= 2002 Connecticut Secretary of the State election =

2002 Connecticut Secretary of State election
- November 5, 2002
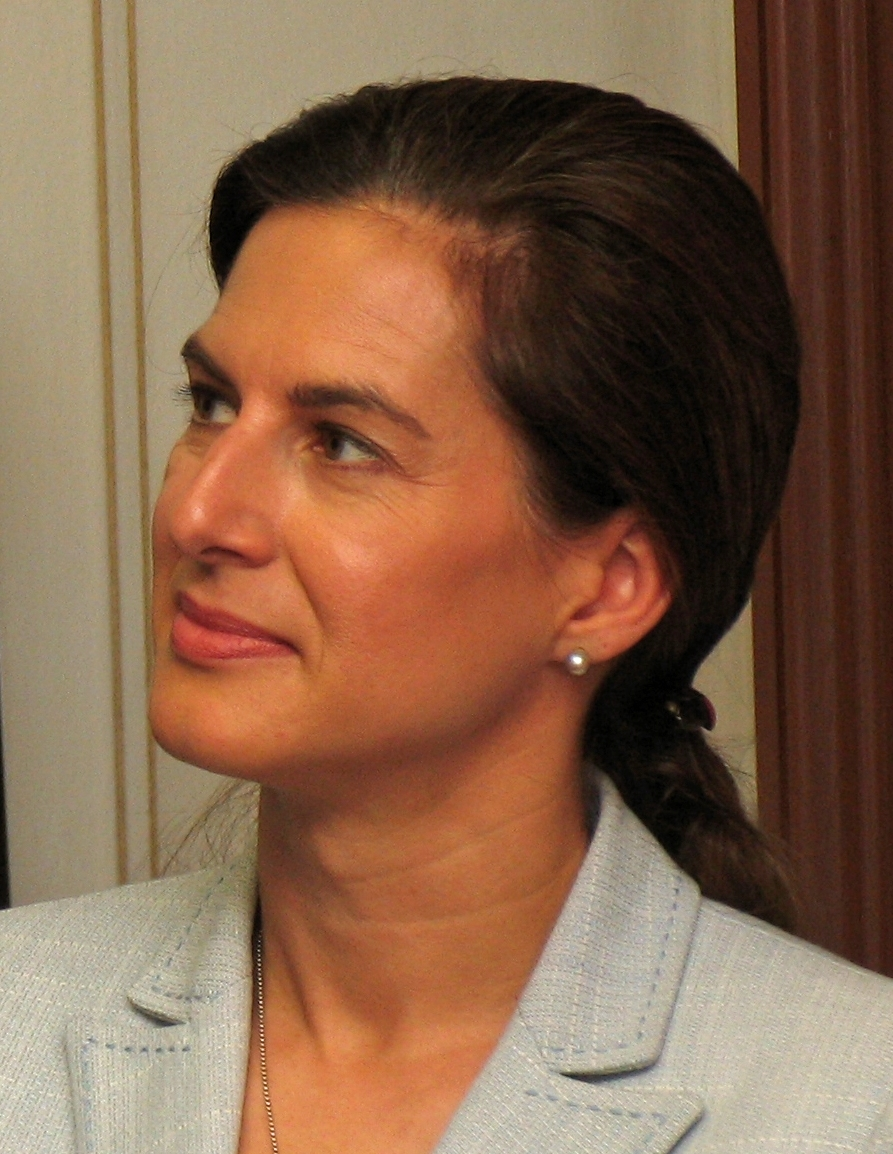

Nominee	Susan Bysiewicz	Ronald San Angelo
Party	Democratic	Republican
Popular vote	611,468	326,774
Percentage	64.2%	34.3%
- Bysiewicz: 40–50% 50–60% 60–70% 70–80% 80–90% San Angelo: 40–50% 50–60% 60–70%
Secretary of State before election
Susan Bysiewicz
Democratic
Elected Secretary of State
Susan Bysiewicz
Democratic

The 2002 Connecticut Secretary of the State election took place on November 5, 2002, to elect the Secretary of the State of Connecticut. Incumbent Democrat Susan Bysiewicz won re-election to a second term, defeating Republican nominee Ronald San Angelo.

== Democratic primary ==
=== Candidates ===
==== Nominee ====
- Susan Bysiewicz, incumbent secretary of the state (1999–2011)

== Republican primary ==
=== Candidates ===
==== Nominee ====
- Ronald San Angelo, former state representative from the 131st district (1993–2003)

== Third-party candidates and independent candidates ==
=== Libertarian Party ===
==== Nominee ====
- Darlene H. Nicholas, candidate for state representative from the 39th district in 1998

== General election ==
=== Results ===
2002 Connecticut Secretary of the State election
Party	Candidate	Votes	%	±%
Democratic	Susan Bysiewicz (incumbent)	611,468	64.22%	+5.12%
Republican	Ronald San Angelo	326,774	34.32%	−5.48%
Libertarian	Darlene H. Nicholas	13,922	1.46%	+0.36%
Total votes		952,164	100.0%	
Democratic hold				

=== By congressional district ===
Bysiewicz won all five congressional districts, including three that elected Republicans.

District	Bysiewicz	San Angelo	Representative
1st	73%	26%	John Larson
2nd	68%	30%	Rob Simmons
3rd	66%	32%	Rosa DeLauro
4th	51%	47%	Chris Shays
5th	60%	39%	Nancy Johnson
