= Anne Hughes (politician) =

American politician from Connecticut

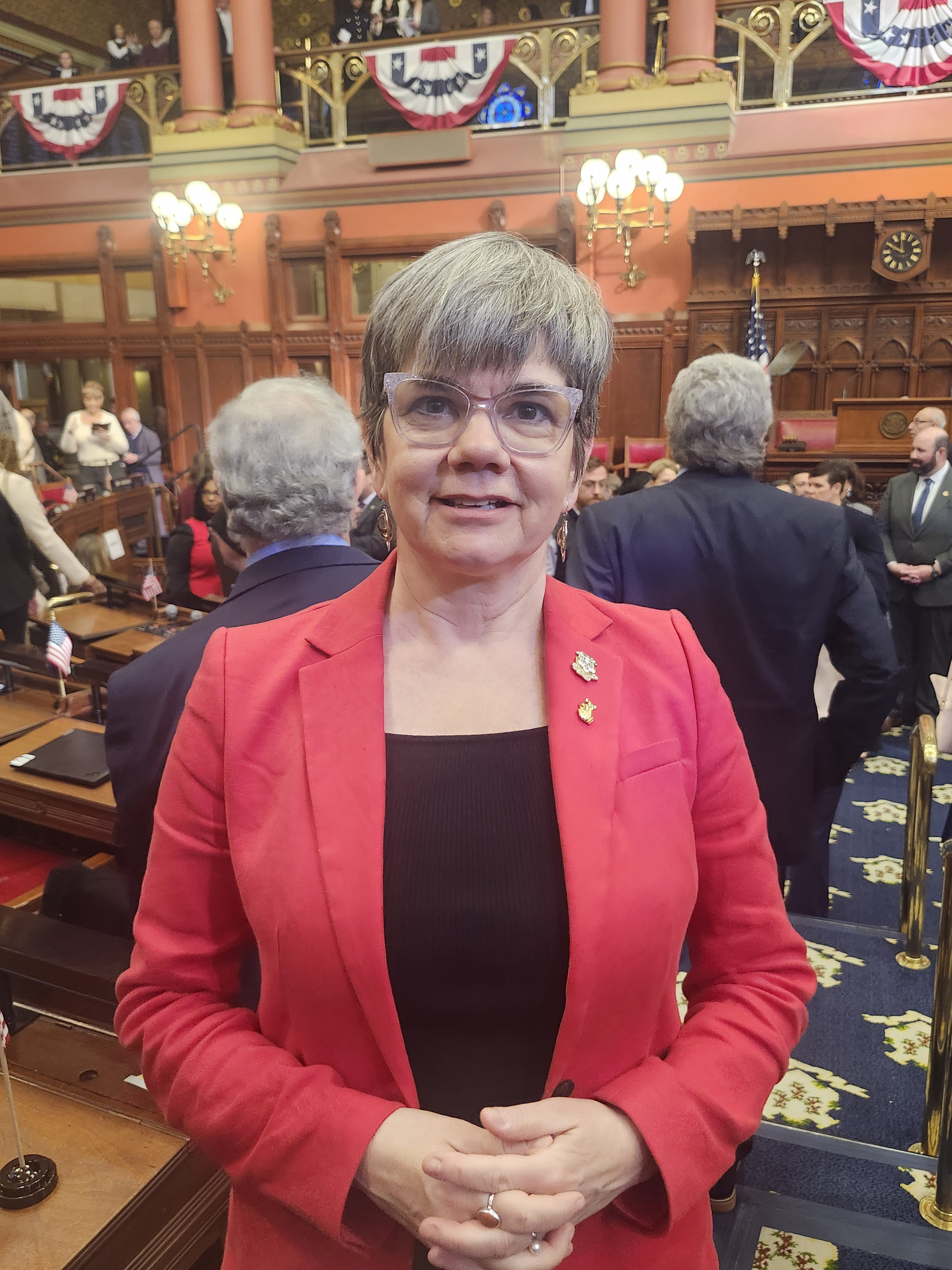

Member of the Connecticut House of Representatives from the 135th district
- Incumbent
- Assumed office January 9, 2019
- Preceded by: Adam Dunsby

Personal details
- Born: Anne Meiman; July 3, 1965 (age 61) Fairfield, Connecticut, U.S.
- Party: Democratic
- Spouse: Tim Hughes
- Education: College of New Rochelle (BA); University of New England (MSW)

Anne Hughes (née Meiman; born July 3, 1965) is an American politician serving as a member of the Connecticut House of Representatives. A member of the Democratic Party, Hughes represents the 135th district, encompassing the towns of Redding, Weston, and parts of Easton. She was first elected in 2018 and co-chairs the House Progressive Democratic Caucus.

== Early life and education ==
Hughes was born July 3, 1965, in Fairfield, Connecticut, to public school teachers Phil and Kay Meiman. She earned a Bachelor of Arts from the College of New Rochelle, and a Master of Social Work from the University of New England. Hughes lives in Easton with her husband and is a social worker.

== Political career ==
In 2018, Hughes ran for Connecticut's 135th House of Representatives district, which contained all of Easton, Weston, and parts of Redding. She faced one-term incumbent Republican Adam Dunsby, who also was serving as Easton's first selectman. Hughes defeated Dunsby with 54 percent of the vote, becoming the first Democrat to win the 135th since 1970, when the district was based in Bridgeport.

In her first term, Hughes, along with Rep. Joshua Hall co-chaired the House Progressive Democratic Caucus, which advocated for tax hikes aimed at the wealthy, criminal justice reform, and investments in addressing climate change. She also advocated for paid family medical leave, and was a kidney donor for her godson in 2015.

In 2020, Hughes faced former state representative John Shaban, who represented the district from 2011-2017, but unsuccessfully ran for Congress in 2016 instead of seeking re-election. She defeated Shaban with 57 percent of the vote. Hughes was again re-elected in 2022 and 2024, receiving over 60 percent of the vote both times.

=== 2025 hot mic incident ===
On April 15, 2025, Hughes spoke during a press conference held by the Tax Equity Caucus at the Connecticut State Capitol in Hartford. The event coincided with Tax Day and focused on proposals to increase the capital gains tax, expand the child tax credit, and loosen the state's fiscal guardrails. Near the end of the event, Hughes was inadvertently recorded on a hot mic saying "We're not rich. But I always say to the governor, tax my people. They won't even notice." This remark prompted backlash from many Republican lawmakers, although Hughes defended her comments by saying she was referring to only her wealthiest constituents, who she says wouldn't face financial strain from increased taxes.

=== 2026 Larceny Charge ===
On October 31, 2026, Hughes was issued a promise to appear by local police and charged with larceny for stealing her opponent’s campaign signs. Some of the stolen signs quoted her previous hot mic statement.
