= Northeast College of Health Sciences =

Private chiropractic college in Seneca Falls, New York, United States

- Type: Private alternative health college
- Established: 1919; 107 years ago
- Endowment: $66.1 million (2025)
- President: Michael A. Mestan
- Students: 828 (winter 2018)
- Location: Seneca Falls, New York, United States; 42°54′41.96″N 76°45′23.2″W
- Website: www.northeastcollege.edu

Northeast College of Health Sciences is a private alternative health college in Seneca Falls, New York. It is one of 20 accredited chiropractic programs in the United States.

== History ==
The school was founded in New York City as Columbia Institute of Chiropractic by chiropractor Frank Dean in 1919. In 1977, the New York State Board of Regents recognized the college under the name New York Chiropractic College before moving from Manhattan to Long Island three years later. In 1989, unable to expand in Long Island, Northeast purchased the former Eisenhower College campus in Seneca Falls, New York. After two years of renovations, the college moved to the 286-acre Seneca Falls campus in 1991.

On June 7, 2021, the college changed its name from New York Chiropractic College to Northeast College of Health Sciences, to better reflect its diversification of programs.

In 2024, the college established a new branch campus in Levittown, New York, on Long Island, offering an additional cohort of its Doctor of Chiropractic program. That year, the college also began offering its first undergraduate programs -- AAS and certificate programs -- at its main Seneca Falls campus.

== Academics ==
In addition to a Doctor of Chiropractic program, the college offers graduate programs in physician assistant studies, clinical nutrition, diagnostic imaging, anatomy, and human anatomy & physiology instruction.

Undergraduate programs include AAS degrees in diagnostic medical sonography and radiologic technology, as well as a certificate in massage therapy.

== Outreach and partnerships ==
The college runs community clinics in Seneca Falls, Depew, and Levittown, New York. They also provide massage therapy services to student-athletes from Syracuse University.

The school is affiliated with Veterans Hospitals in Syracuse, Buffalo, Canandaigua, and Bath, New York, as well as Miami, Florida.

== Notable alumni ==
- Paul Frame, American ballet dancer
- Karyn Marshall, Olympic weightlifter and Doctor of Chiropractic in New Jersey
- Ora Golan, Founder of The Ora Golan Center for Functional Medicine
- John Napier, American bobsled driver
