= Mynderse Academy =

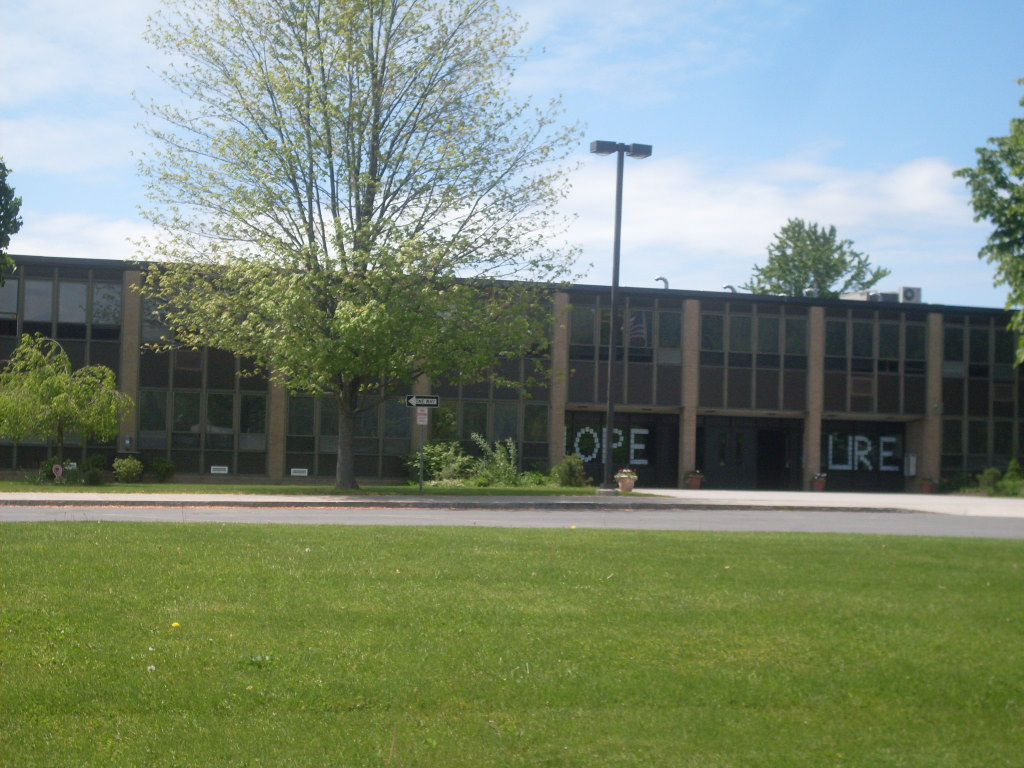

Location
- 105 Troy St; Seneca Falls, New York 13148; United States
- Coordinates: 42.923116°N 76.796804°W

Information
- Type: Public
- School district: Seneca Falls Central School District
- NCES School ID: 362643003624
- Principal: Faith Lewis
- Teaching staff: 35.36 (on an FTE basis)
- Grades: 9-12
- Enrollment: 367 (2021–2022)
- Student to teacher ratio: 10.38
- Campus: Rural
- Colors: Blue and White
- Athletics conference: Section V (NYSPHSAA)
- Mascot: Blue Devils
- Rival: Waterloo High School
- Yearbook: Myndersian
- Website: mynderseacademy.senecafallscsd.org

Mynderse Academy is a public high school located in Seneca Falls, New York, United States that teaches according to the Board of Regents. It is located adjacent to Seneca Falls Middle School.

== History ==
Mynderse Academy was previously located at 12 North Park Street in Seneca Falls. Due to crowding issues, the school moved to its current location on Troy Street. The Park Street building, known as "Academy Square", currently houses offices for several businesses and service groups. On December 19, 2017, a Capital Project referendum was held, resulting in a vote of 178–31 in favor of the proposition. The major reconstruction will include a new bus garage and parking areas, renovated locker rooms, gymnasium, and science classrooms. The project began in 2019.

== Notable alumni ==
- Emil Bove, attorney
- William J. Maier (1876–1941), New York Assemblyman
- Harold C. Mitchell (1872–1938), New York Assemblyman
- Michael Nozzolio (born 1951), New York State Senator
- Kelly Connell (born 1956), Actor
- Wayne A. Abernathy, American business leader

== Notable teachers ==
- J. Stanley Marshall (1923–2014), Physics Teacher, President of Florida State University
