= Whit Betts =

American politician (born 1950)

Member of the Connecticut House of Representatives from the 78th district
- In office January 5, 2011 – January 4, 2023
- Preceded by: William Hamzy
- Succeeded by: Joe Hoxha

Personal details
- Born: George Whitefield Betts; January 4, 1950 (age 76) Westhampton Beach, New York, U.S.
- Party: Republican
- Spouse: Jarre Betts
- Children: 2 (Amy and Drew)
- Education: Eisenhower College (BS)

George Whitefield "Whit" Betts (born January 4, 1950) is a retired American politician who served in the Connecticut House of Representatives from the 78th district from 2011 to 2022.

== Early life and education ==
George Whitefield Betts was born on January 4, 1950 in Westhampton Beach, New York. He attended Eisenhower College, where he earned a bachelor's degree in sociology, with some records also listing psychology, graduating in 1973. He is a Christian Congregationalist and settled in Bristol, Connecticut, where he made his home with his wife, Jarre, and their two children, Amy and Drew.

=== Career before politics ===
Before entering the legislature, Betts worked in the private sector as director of sales at Green Acres Farm, a business based in Bristol. He was also active in local government, serving as a member of the Bristol City Council from 1989 to 1991.

== Political career ==
Betts was first elected to represent the 78th House district in November 2010, defeating Democrat Richard Covello and succeeding longtime Republican incumbent William Hamzy, who left the seat to become a probate judge. He went on to win reelection five more times, defeating Dan Santorso in 2012 and 2014, Krystal Myers in 2016, Allen Marko in 2018, and Aileen Abrams, running on the Independent Party line, in 2020, generally by wide margins.

Over his tenure Betts served on the Appropriations Committee, the Public Health Committee, the Higher Education and Employment Advancement Committee and the Aging Committee. House Republican Leader Themis Klarides appointed him House Republican Whip for the 2017 and 2018 sessions, and he went on to serve as Senior Minority Whip from 2021 to 2023.

== Political views and statements ==
Betts was a fiscally conservative legislator focused on taxes, spending and the state's business climate. In 2015 he voted against the state budget negotiated by Democratic leaders, which included roughly 1.5 billion dollars in tax increases, joining fellow Republicans in opposing it. In a statement issued at the time, he called the package an insult to Connecticut taxpayers and said the majority party kept balancing the budget on the backs of hardworking residents. He warned that the exodus of families and friends from the state would accelerate as new taxes pushed people toward more affordable states, and he pointed to companies including GE, Aetna, IBM and Travelers reconsidering their presence in Connecticut in response to the tax package.

Betts was also a vocal opponent of proposals to install highway tolls in Connecticut, a major fight in state politics during the late 2010s. In March 2019 he joined fellow Republican representative Chris Ziogas at a public forum in Bristol to lay out his opposition to Democratic tolling plans.

== Retirement ==
In November 2021, Betts announced he would not seek reelection to a seventh term, citing his personal belief in term limits for elected officials. House Minority Leader Vincent Candelora praised him as a lawmaker skilled at conveying his constituents' concerns to his colleagues. During his tenure, Betts received the Hands and Hearts award from Wheeler Clinic and a Bristol Hospital Champion Award. He served out the remainder of his term, and Republican Joe Hoxha succeeded him in the seat beginning in January 2023.
