= Harold C. Mitchell =

American politician (1872–1938)

Harold Crowell Mitchell (July 8, 1872 – February 22, 1938) was an American lawyer and politician from New York.

== Life ==
Mitchell was born on July 8, 1872, in Seneca Falls, New York, the son of Benjamin F. Mitchell and Lena A. Crowell.

Mitchell attended the Mynderse Academy in Seneca Falls. He began attending Cornell University in 1891 and became a member of Phi Delta Phi. He graduated from Cornell Law School in 1893. He was then admitted to the bar and settled in Rochester. At one point, he was in the office of Judge George F. Danforth and his son Congressman Henry G. Danforth. In 1896, he began practicing law in Rochester, first alone and then as a member of the firm Mitchell and Bostwick. In 1900, he moved to New York City and began practicing law there. At one point, he was associated with the former Attorney General of New York Albert Ottinger, followed by a partnership with Nathan Ottinger. He later practiced independently, with offices at 25 West Broadway.

In 1914, Mitchell was elected to the New York State Assembly as a Republican, representing the New York County 21st District. He served in the Assembly in 1915, 1917, and 1918. He lost the 1915 election to the Assembly to Democrat Thomas T. Reilley. In 1918, he unsuccessfully ran for the New York State Senate in New York's 20th State Senate district, losing to Democrat William C. Dodge.

Mitchell was president of his district's Republican Club and the All-Steel Scale Company. He was a member of the New York State Bar Association, the New York County Lawyers' Association, the York Rite, the Elks, the National Republican Club, the American Bar Association, the Knights Templar, and the Shriners. He was a Master of his Freemason lodge and a High Priest of his Royal Arch Masonry chapter. He was also a director of the Catskill Realty Company. He was a Presbyterian. In 1901, he married Myra Sanford. She died, and in 1910 he married Rose C. Lomer.

Mitchell died in the Knickerbocker Hospital from heart disease on February 22, 1938. He was buried in the Riverside Cemetery in Rochester.

New York State Assembly
Preceded by Dean Nelson	New York State Assembly; New York County, 21st District; 1915	Succeeded by Thomas T. Reilley
Preceded by Thomas T. Reilley	New York State Assembly; New York County, 21st District; 1917–1918	Succeeded by John Clifford Hawkins
