= Samuel Freedman (disambiguation) =

Samuel Freedman (1908–1993) was a Canadian lawyer and judge.

Samuel Freedman may also refer to:

- Samuel G. Freedman (born 1955), American author, journalist, and professor
- Samuel O. Freedman (born 1928), Canadian immunologist
- Samuel S. Freedman (1927–2012), American jurist and legislator

== See also ==
- Samuel Friedman (disambiguation)
- Samuel Freeman (disambiguation)
