= Kevin DelGobbo =

American politician (1964–2017)

Member of the Connecticut House of Representatives from the 70th district
- In office January 8, 1997 – January 7, 2009
- Preceded by: Timothy Barth
- Succeeded by: Rosa Rebimbas

Personal details
- Born: April 15, 1964 Oradell, New Jersey, U.S.
- Died: July 3, 2017 (aged 53) Naugatuck, Connecticut, U.S.
- Party: Republican

Kevin DelGobbo (April 15, 1964 – July 3, 2017) was an American politician who served in the Connecticut House of Representatives from the 70th district from 1997 to 2009. In 2009, he was appointed to the Department of Public Utility Control (DPUC) by then-Governor Dannel Malloy and served as the Chair of the Public Utilities Regulatory Authority, the DPUC's successor entity, from July 1, 2011 until May 11, 2012.

A resident of Naugatuck, Connecticut, since 1976, he graduated in 1986 from the University of Connecticut.

He died on July 3, 2017, in Naugatuck, Connecticut, at age 53.
