= Samuel Freeman =

Samuel Freeman may refer to:

- Sam Freeman (baseball) (born 1987), American baseball pitcher
- Samuel Freeman (engraver) (1773–1857), English engraver
- Samuel Freeman (Canadian politician) (1824–1902), merchant and political figure in Nova Scotia, Canada
- Samuel Freeman (philosopher), American philosopher
- Samuel Freeman (priest) (1644–1707), Dean of Peterborough

== See also ==
- Samuel Freedman (disambiguation)
- Samuel Friedman (disambiguation)
