= Joe Hoxha =

American politician

Member of the Connecticut House of Representatives from the 78th district
- Incumbent
- Assumed office January 4, 2023
- Preceded by: Whit Betts

Personal details
- Born: Tirana, Albania
- Party: Republican
- Education: University of Connecticut (BS)

Joe Hoxha is an Albanian-American politician. He is a Republican member of the Connecticut House of Representatives serving in the 78th district since 2022.

== Early life and education ==
Hoxha was born in Tirana, Albania. His family moved to the United States when he was three and a half years old, and he grew up in the West End section of Bristol, Connecticut, where his family had to adjust to a new language and worked difficult jobs for low pay. He earned a bachelor's degree in political science and sociology from the University of Connecticut in 2014.

== Early career ==
After college, Hoxha worked on political campaigns across the country as a field director for Republican candidates in Texas, Virginia, New Hampshire and Missouri, in addition to Connecticut. He managed the successful sweep by Plymouth Republicans of nearly every municipal seat in the 2017 election cycle. He eventually settled back in Bristol, where he became active in local and state Republican party organizations and was elected to the party's governing body, known as State Central. In 2019 he moved into the financial services industry, taking a position with a local community bank, and by the time he ran for office he described himself as a financial executive at that bank.

== Political career ==
In May 2022, Plymouth and Bristol Republicans unanimously endorsed Hoxha, then 29 years old, to run for the 78th District seat, held for over a decade by longtime Republican Whit Betts, who was not seeking reelection. Hoxha won the seat in the November 2022 general election and took office on 4 January 2023, becoming, at around 30 years old, one of the youngest members of the chamber. He won reelection in November 2024, after his Republican primary was canceled. As of 2026, he sits on the House Appropriations Committee, the Banking Committee and the Government Administration and Elections Committee.

=== Legislative record ===
Hoxha has sponsored a bill directing state funding toward research and record keeping on unidentified anomalous phenomena, commonly known as UFOs or UAPs. In written testimony supporting the measure, he argued that Connecticut has one of the highest rates of reported UFO sightings per capita in the country and said he wanted the state to create a framework for better understanding and centralizing information on such sightings, comparing his proposal to similar legislation passed in New Jersey. He wrote that he did not intend the bill to be used to draw premature conclusions about the nature of the phenomena.

Regarding other legislation, Hoxha voted in favor of a 2023 measure authorizing about 49 million dollars in arbitration awarded pandemic pay for more than 34,000 state employees who had continued working during the COVID-19 pandemic, funded partly through federal American Rescue Plan Act money, while saying at the time that more should be done to assist workers in the private sector who received no comparable compensation.

In May 2025, Hoxha vehemently opposed and demanded a gubernatorial veto of Senate Bill 8. The bill allowed striking employees to collect state unemployment benefits after 14 days, a measure he criticized as fiscally irresponsible.

== Political views and statements ==
Hoxha describes himself as a conservative Republican who supports America First policies. In his 2022 candidate survey with Ballotpedia, he said he opposes gender identity politics being introduced into public schools and opposes the teaching of critical race theory in public schools. He has also said he supports restoring qualified immunity for police officers in Connecticut and favors toughening minimum sentencing requirements to deter crime.

Announcing his candidacy, Hoxha said he was running for parents who feel powerless against school systems that strip away their rights, for crime victims, for working class residents facing rising taxes and regulation, and to restore faith in an electoral process he said many voters believe is rigged. In a 2022 statement to a local newspaper, he criticized what he called an environment in the state that draws in more takers than makers at the expense of small business owners and factory workers, and he pointed to the large number of residents who had left Connecticut for southern states in recent decades as evidence of the problem. He has noted his father's explanation for why the family left Albania, that America is the greatest country on Earth, as a shaping influence on his outlook. In an interview with the Albanian-American outlet Atlantiku, he described himself as a proud culture warrior who stands up against what he calls wokeism and said he was raised to be conservative on both economic and social issues.
