= John Stripp =

American politician and business executive (1938–2020)

John E. Stripp

Member of the Connecticut House of Representatives from the 135th district
- In office 1993–2011
- Preceded by: Alice Virginia Meyer
- Succeeded by: John Shaban

Personal details
- Born: John Edward Stripp; August 10, 1938 Springfield Gardens, New York, U.S.
- Died: August 7, 2020 (aged 81) Norwalk, Connecticut, U.S.
- Party: Republican

Military service
- Branch/service: United States Air Force

John Edward Stripp (August 10, 1938 – August 7, 2020) was an American politician and business executive. A member of the Republican Party, he served in the Connecticut House of Representatives from 1993 to 2011 for the 135th District, which encompasses Weston, Redding and Easton. He previously served on the Board of Selectman of Weston, Connecticut from 1983 to 1992.

== Early life and education ==
John Edward Stripp was born August 10, 1938, in Springfield Gardens in Queens, New York, to John W. (1914–1993) and Helen Stripp (née Weidick; 1916–2010).
