= Cayuga Lake State Park =

State park in Seneca County, New York

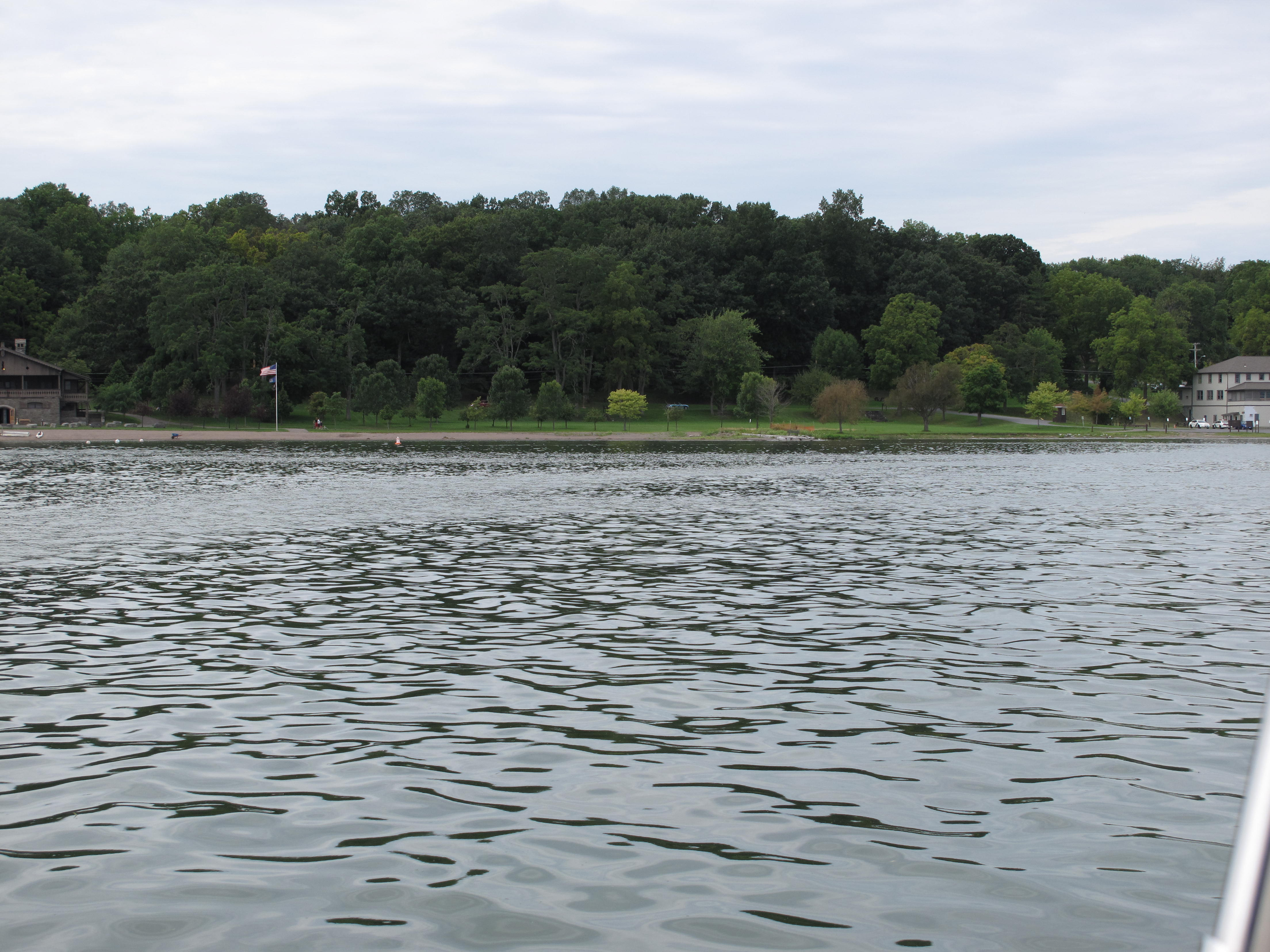
- Cayuga Lake State Park, August 2009

- Location within New York
- Interactive map of Cayuga Lake State Park
- Type: State park
- Location: 2678 Lower Lake Road; Seneca Falls, New York
- Nearest city: Seneca Falls, New York
- Coordinates: 42°53′46″N 76°45′00″W
- Area: 141 acres (0.57 km^{2})
- Created: 1927
- Operator: New York State Office of Parks, Recreation and Historic Preservation
- Visitors: 129,415 (in 2014)
- Open: All year
- Website: Cayuga Lake State Park

Cayuga Lake State Park is a 141-acre (0.57 km^{2}) state park located on the north end of Cayuga Lake, east of the village of Seneca Falls in Seneca County, New York, United States.

== Park description ==
Cayuga Lake State Park offers a beach, two playgrounds, playing fields, picnic tables and pavilions, recreation programs, a nature trail, showers, fishing, a boat launch, a dump station, cabins with view of the lake, a vacation rental, campground for tents and trailers, sledding, cross-country skiing and ice fishing.

The park is situated along New York State Route 89. The road splits the park in half, with electric sites being in the East camp closer to the lake, while nonelectric sites are located in the West camp.

== See also ==
- List of New York state parks
