= Finger Lakes Regional Airport =

- IATA: none; ICAO: none; FAA LID: 0G7

Summary
- Airport type: Public
- Owner: Seneca County
- Serves: Seneca Falls, New York
- Opened: January 6, 1943; 83 years ago
- Elevation AMSL: 491 ft (150 m)
- Coordinates: 42°52′49.37″N 76°46′59.48″W

Map
- Location within New York

Runways
Direction	Length		Surface
Direction	ft	m	Surface
01/19	4,952	1,509	Asphalt
11/29	1,850	564	Turf
- Source: Federal Aviation Administration

Finger Lakes Regional Airport (FAA LID: 0G7) is a public-use airport located 2 mi (3.2 km) Southeast of Seneca Falls, a town in Seneca County, New York, United States. It is owned by the government of Seneca County. This airport is included in the FAA's National Plan of Integrated Airport Systems for 2009–2013, which categorized it as a general aviation facility.

== Facilities and aircraft ==
Finger Lakes Regional Airport covers an area of 110 acres (45 ha) at an elevation of 491 ft (150 m) above mean sea level. It has two runway with asphalt and turf surfaces: 1/19 is 4,952 by 75 feet (1,509 x 23 m); 11/29 is 1,850 by 70 feet (564 x 21 m).

== See also ==
- List of airports in New York
