= Adam Dunsby =

American businessman, financier and politician (born 1967)

- Official portrait, 2013

Member of the Connecticut House of Representatives from the 135th district
- In office 2017–2019
- Preceded by: John Shaban
- Succeeded by: Anne Hughes

First Selectman of Easton
- In office November 6, 2013 – November 18, 2019
- Preceded by: Tom Hermann
- Succeeded by: David Bindelglass

Personal details
- Born: Adam Walter Dunsby; December 11, 1967 (age 58) Lebanon, New Jersey, U.S.
- Party: Republican
- Spouse: Catherine Barriger (m. 1996)
- Children: 4
- Education: University of Pennsylvania (BS); Wharton School (PhD)

Adam Walter Dunsby (/ˈdʌnzbi/ DUNZ-bee; born December 11, 1967) is an American businessman, financier and politician. He is a former member of the Connecticut House of Representatives who represented the 135th District, which encompasses Easton, Weston and parts of Redding, between 2017 and 2019. Dunsby, a member of the Republican Party, was also a former First Selectman of Easton between 2013 and 2019.

== Early life and education ==
Dunsby was born December 11, 1967, in Lebanon, New Jersey to Walter Everett Dunsby and Janet Ann Dunsby (née Eckstein; 1941–2023). He was raised in Clinton Township, New Jersey and attended North Hunterdon High School. His father was a principal at Ashmead Insurance Associates in Newtown, Pennsylvania. Dunsby earned a Bachelor of Science in Business Administration from the University of Pennsylvania in 1990. From 1990 to 1995, he completed a Ph.D. in Finance at the Wharton School of Business.

== Career ==
From 1995 to 2008, he worked for Cornerstone Quantitative Investment Group, a financial services, asset and fund management company, of which he became a principal. In 2008, he founded and partnered in SummerHaven Investment Management, based in Stamford, Connecticut, an alternative investment management firm. Since 2020, he is co-founder and principal of Mansby Capital, a real estate bridge lending firm, based in New York. Since 2022, he is an adjunct professor of finance at Sacred Heart University in Fairfield, Connecticut.

=== Political career ===
Dunsby began his political career while serving in the municipal legislative, as member of the Easton Conservation Commission from 2003 to 2009, where he served the two final years as chairman. Between 2009 and 2013 he served as an elected member of the Board of Education in his hometown of Easton, Connecticut. In 2013, he narrowly defeated write-in challenger, Valerie J. Buckley, and became First Selectman of Easton. He served in this position until 2019.

In 2016, Dunsby announced to run for the Connecticut House of Representatives. On November 8, 2016, he defeated Bonnie Troy in the general election with 7,186 votes (53.3%).

Dunsby ran for reelection in 2018, but was defeated by Democrat Anne Hughes, who earned 6,567 (53.8%) of the vote to his 5,576 (45.7%) votes.

== Personal life ==
Adam Dunsby is married to Cathy Brundige Dunsby (née Barriger). The couple has four children.

He has been a resident of Easton, Connecticut since 2002.
