= Thomas T. Reilley =

American football coach (1883–1940)

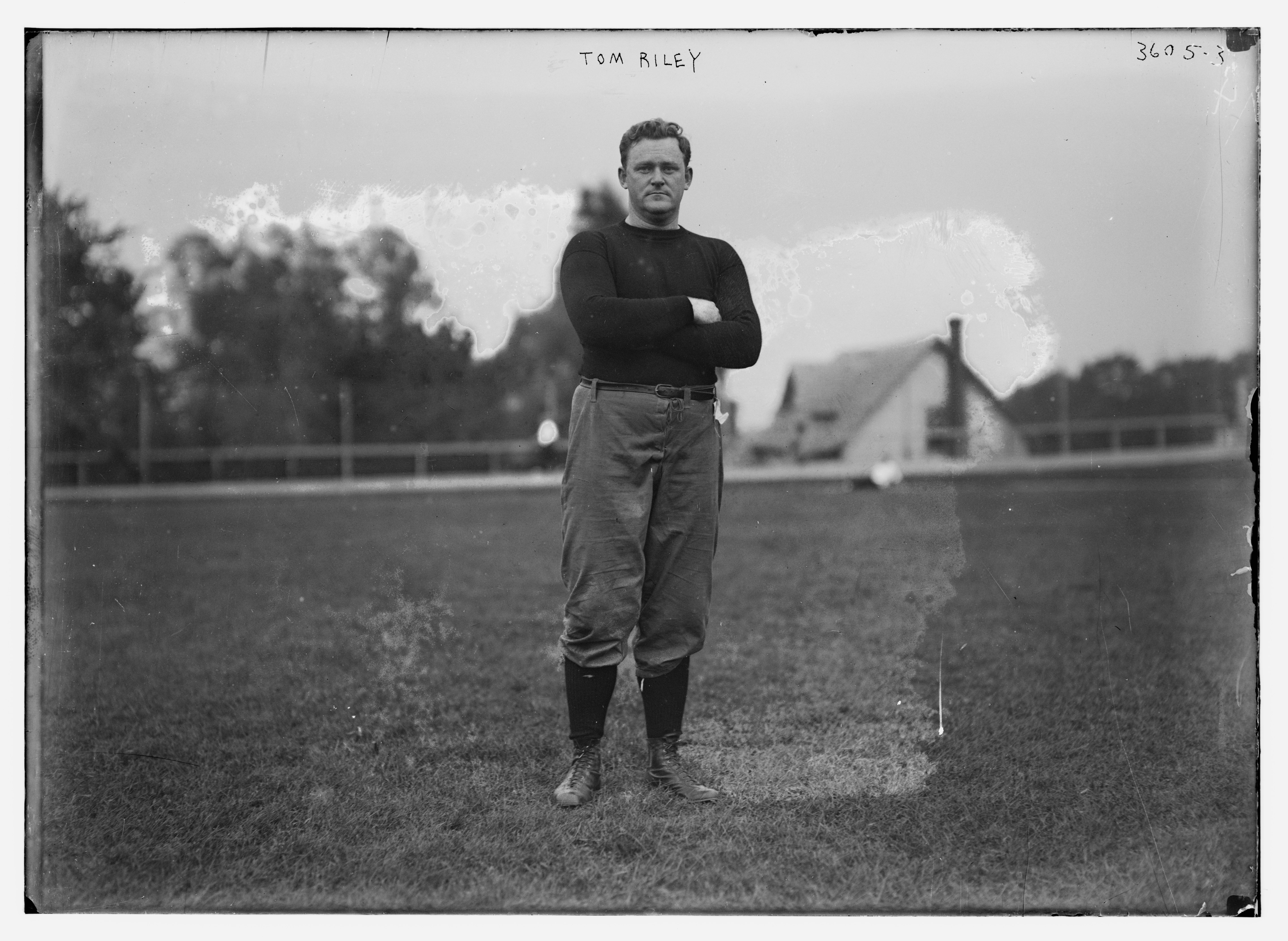

Biographical details
- Born: March 20, 1883; Manhattan, New York, U.S.
- Died: January 27, 1940 (aged 56); Mount Vernon, New York, U.S.

Coaching career (HC unless noted)
- 1914–1915: NYU

Head coaching record
- Overall: 9–7–2

Thomas Thornton Reilley (March 20, 1883 – January 27, 1940) was an American college football coach and politician. He served the 12th head football coach at New York University (NYU). He held that position for two seasons, 1914 and 1915, leading the NYU Violets to a record of 9–7–2. Having come off a scoreless, losing season in 1913 under Jake High, NYU's record under Reilley in 1914 of 5–3–1 showed a marked improvement. However, Reilleys' tenure at NYU ended in 1915 with a 70–0 loss to Rutgers.

Reilley was a Democratic member of the New York State Assembly (New York Co., 21st D.) in 1916.

== Head coaching record ==
| Year | Team | Overall | Conference | Standing | Bowl/playoffs |
|---|---|---|---|---|---|
NYU Violets (Independent) (1914–1915)
| 1914 | NYU | 5–3–1 | | | |
| 1915 | NYU | 4–4–1 | | | |
| NYU: | | 9–7–2 | | | |
| Total: | | 9–7–2 | | | |

New York State Assembly
| Preceded by Harold C. Mitchell | New York State Assembly; New York County, 21st District; 1916 | Succeeded by Harold C. Mitchell |
