= Seth Bronko =

American politician (born 1988)

Member of the Connecticut House of Representatives from the 70th district
- Incumbent
- Assumed office Jan 4, 2023
- Preceded by: Rosa Rebimbas

Personal details
- Born: Seth Bronko; 1988 (age 37–38) Naugatuck, Connecticut, U.S.
- Party: Republican
- Education: University of Connecticut (BS)

Seth Bronko (born 1988) is an American Republican politician serving District 70 in the Connecticut House of Representatives. He was elected in the 2022 election against Democratic opponent Jeff Litke. He was previously chairman of the Naugatuck Republican Town Committee, but resigned to seek office in the House. He has served on local boards in Naugatuck, including the Finance Board, Naugatuck Economic Development Corporation, Naugatuck Education Foundation, Naugatuck Valley Health District and Naugatuck Youth Services. He was the co-owner of Bronko Construction before becoming a licensed real estate agent.
