= William Hamzy =

American politician (born 1966)

William A. Hamzy

Judge of Probate for Bristol-Plymouth
- Incumbent
- Assumed office January 4, 2023
- Preceded by: Andre Dorval

Member of the Connecticut House of Representatives from the 78th district
- In office January 4, 1995 – January 5, 2011
- Preceded by: Edward C. Krawiecki Jr.
- Succeeded by: Whit Betts

Personal details
- Born: January 4, 1966 (age 60) Torrington, Connecticut, U.S.
- Party: Republican

William A. Hamzy (born January 4, 1966) is an American politician and judge, currently serving on the Bristol-Plymouth Probate Court. His jurisdiction includes the towns of Bristol and Plymouth, Connecticut. He was elected in 2022, having run unopposed.

He previously served in the Connecticut House of Representatives from the 78th district from 1995 to 2011.
