= Rosa Rebimbas =

American politician

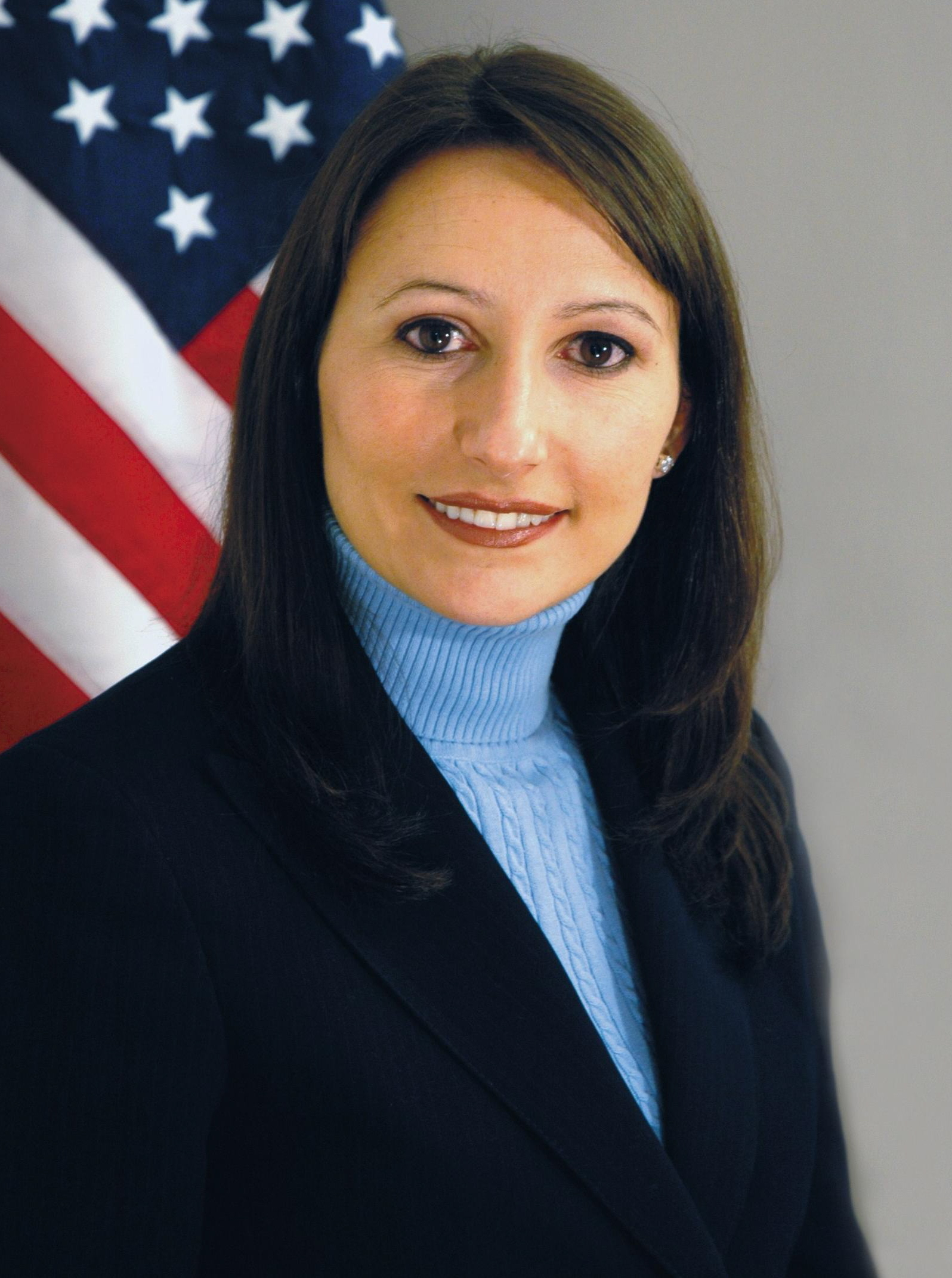

Judge of Probate for Naugatuck
- Incumbent
- Assumed office January 4, 2023
- Preceded by: Peter E. Mariano

Member of the Connecticut House of Representatives from the 70th district
- In office March 4, 2009 – January 4, 2023
- Preceded by: Kevin DelGobbo
- Succeeded by: Seth Bronko

Personal details
- Born: Naugatuck, Connecticut, U.S.
- Party: Republican
- Spouse: Ever Linares
- Website: Official website

Rosa C. Rebimbas is an American politician and judge, currently serving on the Naugatuck Probate Court with jurisdiction over the towns of Naugatuck, Beacon Falls, Middlebury, and Prospect.

She previously served as a Republican member of the Connecticut House of Representatives from 2009 to 2023, representing the 70th District around Naugatuck just south of Waterbury. She is the owner/sole proprietor of The Law Offices of Rosa C. Rebimbas, a general law firm in Naugatuck, Connecticut.

== Education and personal life ==
Rebimbas received her Bachelor of Arts in Political Science and Secondary Education along with a minor in Faith, Peace and Justice from Fairfield University. She received her Juris Doctor from the S.J. Quinney College of Law at the University of Utah. She is a former president of the Habitat for Humanity of Greater Waterbury.

== Legal career ==
In addition to legislative work, Rebimbas is a practicing lawyer in Naugatuck, Connecticut, where she founded The Law Offices of Rosa C. Rebimbas in 2007. This is a general law office doing real estate, personal injury, immigration, criminal defense and family law. As a family lawyer, she has served on the board of directors for the Guardian Ad Litem Services.

== Political career ==
Rebimbas is a former member of the Naugatuck Finance Board and the Water Pollution Board, and a member of the Naugatuck Republican Town Committee. In a district where Democrats outnumber Republicans 2:1, she entered the Connecticut House of Representatives in 2009 after winning a low turnout special election, beating Democrat Kevin McSherry with a margin of 78 votes. With 100% of the votes, she was reelected to the House in 2010, 2012, 2014, 2016 and 2018, always running unopposed in both the republican primary and in the general election. She served as ranking member of the powerful Judiciary Committee, and she was also a member of the Legislative Management Committee.

=== Judge of Probate ===
In 2022, rather than seeking reelection to the House of Representatives, she opted to challenge five-term incumbent Republican Peter Mariano for the position of judge of probate for the 21st (Naugatuck) district.

Mariano had become controversial after being arrested for drunk driving in 2021. He pleaded guilty to two counts of driving under the influence and two counts of reckless endangerment. His one-year jail sentence was suspended after he served four days in May, 2022.

Rebimbas defeated Mariano in the Republican Primary in August, receiving 57.4% of the vote. Mariano remained on the general election ballot, however, as he was still endorsed by the Democratic Party. Rebimbas won the general election on November 8, receiving 59.8% of the vote.

== Political views ==
=== National Popular Vote ===
When Connecticut became the 12th state to join the National Popular Vote Compact, to guarantee that presidential candidate with the most vote nationwide would be elected president by the Electoral College, Rebimbas was one of the Connecticut House members voting against.

=== Sexting ===
In 2010, Rebimbas attracted national attention when she introduced a bill that would lessen the penalty for sexting between two consenting minors, making it a Class A misdemeanor rather than a felony to send or receive text messages that include nude or sexual images. As a felony, violators could end up on the state's sex offender registry. Rebimbas appeared on Fox & Friends and CNN to talk about the bill, and she was also highlighted in several newspapers.

=== Taxes ===
To get a refund of the sales tax, a purchase has to be returned within 90 days. Rebimbas has sponsored legislation to eliminate this 90 day requirement.

=== Transportation ===
Rebimbas has sponsored a 2019 bill that would make it unlawful to drive in the extreme-left lane on state highways unless passing another car or being directed by the police to do so.

=== Wages ===
In 2013, Rebimbas voted against a bill that raised the minimum wage to $8.70, and in 2014 against another bill that gradually raised the minimum wage to $9.15 by 2015, $9.60 by 2016 and $10.10 by 2017. In 2017, Rebimbas sponsored legislation to amend the collective bargaining statutes to limit binding arbitration awards to not more than the Consumer Price Index. The bill died in committee, so she reintroduced it in 2019.

== The Cold heart controversy ==
In 2015 there was a testy exchange between Rebimbas and a woman that was testifying concerning the contentious re-appointment of Chase T. Rogers as chief justice for the Connecticut Supreme Court. Rebimbas supported the reappointment while the witness was part of a court reform movement concerned about the family court system, the probate courts and the foreclosure process. After the exchange, a private email leaked where representative Minnie Gonzalez consoled the witness and wrote that Rebimbas was fighting for her pocket not for the people like you and that she is cold with no heart. Being upset about the name-calling in the email, Rebimbas and the republicans closed down the operations of the judiciary committee on its last day of business, preventing a number of bills to reach the House floor for a vote that year.

== Awards and honors ==
Rebimbas has received many awards and honors. In October 2018 she was recognized as a co-legislators of the year by the Associated Builders and Contractors of Connecticut. The same month she also received the Superhero Award from the Children’s Law Center of Connecticut, a group of lawyers that represent children as guardian ad litems in family court.
