= Samuel Friedman =

Samuel Friedman may refer to:

- Samuel J. Friedman Theatre, a Broadway theater
- Samuel H. Friedman, American journalist and labor union activist

== See also ==
- Samuel Freedman (disambiguation)
- Samuel Freeman (disambiguation)
