= Connecticut's 70th House of Representatives district =

American legislative district

Connecticut's 70th State House of Representatives district
Representative
Seth Bronko; R

Connecticut's 70th House of Representatives district elects one member of the Connecticut House of Representatives. It encompasses parts of the city of Naugatuck and has been represented by Republican Seth Bronko since 2023.

== List of representatives ==
List of Representatives from Connecticut's 70th State House District
Representative	Party	Years	District home	Note
John J. Tiffany II	Republican	1967–1973	Lyme	Seat created
Bernard L. Avcollie	Democratic	1973–1975	Naugatuck	
Neal B. Hanlon	Republican	1975–1983	Naugatuck	
Gerald M. Noonan	Democratic	1983–1987	Naugatuck	
Kevin G. Knowles	Democratic	1987–1993	Naugatuck	
Timothy D. Barth	Republican	1993–1997	Naugatuck	
Kevin DelGobbo	Republican	1997–2011	Naugatuck	
Rosa Rebimbas	Republican	2011–2023	Naugatuck	
Seth Bronko	Republican	2023–	Naugatuck	

== Recent elections ==
=== 2020 ===
2020 Connecticut State House of Representatives election, District 70
Party	Candidate	Votes	%
Republican	Rosa Rebimbas (incumbent)	6,547	59.89
Democratic	Stephen Samela	4,384	40.11
Total votes		10,931	100.00
Republican hold			

=== 2018 ===
2018 Connecticut House of Representatives election, District 70
Party	Candidate	Votes	%
Republican	Rosa Rebimbas (Incumbent)	5,901	100.0
Republican hold			

=== 2016 ===
2016 Connecticut House of Representatives election, District 70
Party	Candidate	Votes	%
Republican	Rosa Rebimbas (Incumbent)	7,232	100.0
Republican hold			

=== 2014 ===
2014 Connecticut House of Representatives election, District 70
Party	Candidate	Votes	%
Republican	Rosa Rebimbas (Incumbent)	4,560	100.0
Republican hold			

=== 2012 ===
2012 Connecticut House of Representatives election, District 70
Party	Candidate	Votes	%
Republican	Rosa Rebimbas (Incumbent)	5,001	100.0
Republican hold			
