= Connecticut Probate Courts =

The Connecticut Probate Court system is a system of 54 individual probate courts located throughout the state of Connecticut. The jurisdiction of each court extends to the legal affairs of the deceased, estates, some aspects of family law, conservatorship, and several other matters requiring specific legal decisions. As statutory courts, all jurisdiction and authority is governed by the state legislature.

== Elections of judges ==
Judges of probate are the only members of the state judicial branch elected in Connecticut. Judges are elected in partisan elections and hold office for a term of four years. Their elections are held in the same years as gubernatorial elections.

Prior to 2011, state law permitted anyone to run as a candidate for judge of probate regardless of previous judicial or legal experience. However, a state law which went into effect on January 5, 2011 now requires candidates for judge of probate to be both a lawyer and a member of the Connecticut bar.

== Consolidation of court districts ==
After operating without much change since 1850, growing financial difficulties in the state and within the probate courts created the need for the system to be overhauled. In the summer of 2009, the Probate Court Redistricting Commission assembled to review the aging court system and make recommendations for decreasing the number of judicial districts from 117. In September 2009, the commission announced its consolidation plan to reduce the number of districts to 54 for the 2010 elections.

== Probate districts ==
This list contains the currently elected judges of probate as of 2025:

District	Municipalities served	Judge of probate	First elected
1. Hartford	Hartford*	Foye A. Smith (D)	2015^{†}
2. West Hartford	West Hartford*	Owen P. Eagan (D)	2016^{†}
3. Tobacco Valley	Bloomfield, East Granby, Suffield, Windsor Locks*	Daniel N. Mara (D)	2022
4. Greater Windsor	East Windsor, South Windsor*, Windsor	Mary C. Deneen (D)	2022
5. East Hartford	East Hartford*	Richard P. Gentile (D)	2022
6. Glastonbury-Hebron	Glastonbury*, Hebron	Sean Michael Peoples (D)	2014
7. Newington	Newington*, Rocky Hill, Wethersfield	Robert A. Randich (D)	2006
8. Berlin	Berlin, New Britain*	William C. Rivera (D)	2022
9. Simsbury Regional	Avon, Canton, Granby, Simsbury*	David C. Shepard (D)	2022
10. Farmington Regional	Burlington, Farmington*, Plainville	Paul R. Bedard (D)	2025^{†}
11. North Central Connecticut	Enfield*, Somers, Stafford, Union	Carolyn L. McCaffrey (R)	2018
12. Ellington	Ellington, Vernon*	Elisa H. Bartlett (D)	2018
13. Greater Manchester	Andover, Bolton, Columbia, Manchester*	Michael M. Darby (D)	2010
14. Region #14	East Haddam, East Hampton, Marlborough*, Portland	Jennifer L. Berkenstock (R)	2010
15. Middletown	Cromwell, Durham, Middlefield, Middletown*	Phrances Leverton Szewczyk (D)	2024^{†}
16. Meriden	Meriden*	Ariana F. Ceneviva (D/R)	2018
17. Wallingford	Wallingford*	Patrick M. Birney (R)	2022
18 Cheshire-Southington	Cheshire*, Southington	Matthew J. Jalowiec (D/R)	2010
19. Bristol-Plymouth	Bristol*, Plymouth	William A. Hamzy (R)	2022
20. Waterbury	Waterbury*, Wolcott	Matthew P. Vaccarelli (D)	2018
21. Naugatuck	Beacon Falls, Naugatuck*, Middlebury, Prospect	Rosa C. Rebimbas (R)	2022
22. Region #22	Bethlehem, Oxford, Roxbury, Southbury*, Washington, Watertown, Woodbury	David K. Labriola (R)	2024^{†}
23. Torrington Area	Barkhamsted, Colebrook, Goshen, Hartland, New Hartford, Torrington*, Winchester, Winsted	James P. Steck (R)	2022
24. Litchfield Hills	Canaan, Cornwall, Harwinton, Kent, Litchfield*, Morris, Norfolk, North Canaan**, Salisbury, Sharon, Thomaston, Warren	Jordan M. Richards (R)	2022
25. Tolland-Mansfield	Coventry, Mansfield, Tolland*, Willington	Sophia H. Shaikh (D)	2024^{†}
26. Northeast	Ashford, Brooklyn, Eastford, Pomfret, Putnam*, Thompson, Woodstock	Gabrielle Labonte (R)	2022
27. Plainfield-Killingly Regional	Canterbury, Killingly, Plainfield*, Sterling	Carol Anne Rowe (R)	2018
28. Windham-Colchester	Colchester, Chaplin, Hampton, Lebanon, Scotland, Windham*	George A. Baker (D)	2024^{†}
29. Norwich	Bozrah, Franklin, Griswold, Lisbon, Norwich*, Preston, Sprague, Voluntown	Charles K. Norris (R)	2010
30. Southeastern CT Regional	Groton*, Ledyard, North Stonington, Stonington	Elizabeth L. Leamon (D)	2020^{†}
31. New London	New London*, Waterford	Mathew H. Greene (D/R)	1992^{†}
32. Niantic Regional	East Lyme*, Montville, Old Lyme, Salem	Jeffrey A. McNamara (R)	2010
33. Saybrook	Chester, Clinton, Deep River, Essex, Haddam, Killingworth, Lyme, Old Saybrook*, Westbrook	Jeannine Lewis (D)	2018
34. Madison-Guilford	Guilford, Madison*	Seth Klaskin (D)	2025^{†}
35. Branford-North Branford	Branford*, North Branford	Charles E. Tiernan, III (D)	2022
36. East Haven-North Haven	East Haven*, North Haven	Michael R. Brandt (R)	2002
37. Hamden-Bethany	Bethany, Hamden*	Michael G. Dolan (D)	2024^{†}
38. New Haven	New Haven*	Americo R. Carchia (D)	2022
39. West Haven	West Haven	Timothy Gunning (D)	2025^{†}
40. Milford-Orange	Milford*, Orange	Ben Gettinger (D)	2021^{†}
41. Derby	Ansonia*, Derby, Seymour, Woodbridge	Clifford D. Hoyle (D/R)	2014
42. Shelton	Shelton*	Fred J. Anthony (R)	1994
43. Danbury	Danbury*	Joseph DaSilva, Jr. (D)	2022
44. Housatonic	Bridgewater, Brookfield, New Fairfield, New Milford*, Sherman	Martin F. Landgrebe (R)	2010
45. Northern Fairfield County	Bethel*, Newtown, Ridgefield, Redding	Steven Boa DeMoura (D)	2022
46. Trumbull	Easton, Monroe, Trumbull*	T.R. Rowe (R)	2014
47. Stratford	Stratford*	Max L. Rosenberg (D)	2018
48. Bridgeport	Bridgeport*	Paul J. Ganim (D)	1998
49. Fairfield	Fairfield*	Katherine E. Caulfield (D)	2024^{†}
50. Westport	Weston, Westport*	Lisa K. Wexler (D)	2014
51. Norwalk-Wilton	Norwalk*, Wilton	Douglas Stern (D)	2018
52. Darien-New Canaan	Darien*, New Canaan	William P. Osterndorf (R)	2014
53. Stamford	Stamford*	Gerald M. Fox, III (D)	2014
54. Greenwich	Greenwich*	David W. Hopper (R)	2002

* Indicates location of the court
** Indicates location of satellite office
^{†} Denotes special election due to resignation, retirement, or death of the previous judge
D = Endorsed by the Democratic Party
R = Endorsed by the Republican Party
D/R = Endorsed by both parties

== See also ==
- Courts of Connecticut
