= Ora Golan =

Israeli chiropractor

- אורה גולן
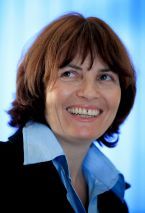
- Born: אורה גולן; Haifa, Israel
- Education: Linus Pauling Institute; Oregon State University; New York Chiropractic College
- Occupation: Chiropractor
- Website: www.oragolan.com

Ora Golan (Hebrew: ד"ר אורה גולן) is an Israeli chiropractor who developed the "Test Anxiety Neutralization" method, and is the founder of the "Ora Golan Center For Emotional Immunity".

== Career ==
Golan studied chiropractic in the United States, and specialized in studies of emotion, neutralization of allergies, anxiety treatment, functional chiropractic and applied kinesiology. In 1990, she began to research and develop her own method in two clinics under her management located in New York City. In 2001, Golan founded the "Ora Golan Center For Emotional Immunity", which treats people suffering from different types of anxieties, relationship problems, ADHD, anger bursts, low self-esteem, allergies, and emotional blocks. She described her philosophy in an interview with Globes: "I give the same treatment to all people who come to me. I attack almost every possible problem, from anxiety, relationship difficulties, emotional eating, fears, ADHD and more.... My goal is to help people return to function in situations that seem to be extreme and critical...I do this without causing the patient fear. The moment the treatment happens, the patient's quality of life improves dramatically." Article removed Ynet News describes Golan as Israel's leading relationship expert.
