= Seneca Falls (CDP), New York =

Seneca Falls, New York
- Hamlet and CDP
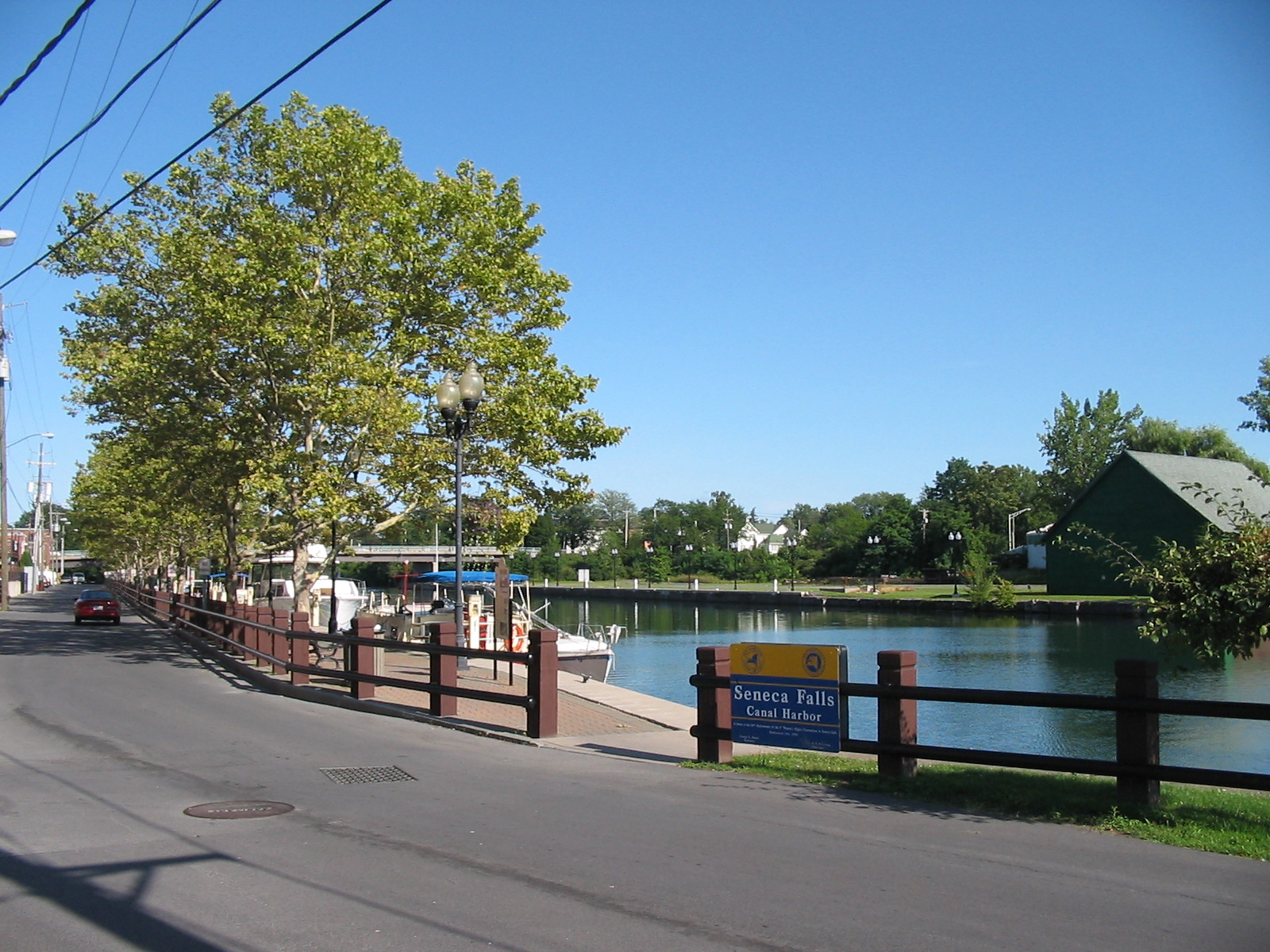
- Seneca Falls Canal Harbor

- Location within the state of New York
- Coordinates: 42°54′31″N 76°47′53″W
- Country: United States
- State: New York
- County: Seneca
- Town: Seneca Falls
- Incorporated: April 22, 1831
- Dissolved: December 31, 2011

Area
  - Total: 4.85 sq mi (12.55 km^{2})
  - Land: 4.69 sq mi (12.14 km^{2})
  - Water: 0.16 sq mi (0.41 km^{2})
- Elevation: 449 ft (137 m)

Population (2020)
  - Total: 6,809
  - Density: 1,452.5/sq mi (560.83/km^{2})
- Time zone: UTC-5 (Eastern (EST))
  - Summer (DST): UTC-4 (EDT)
- ZIP code: 13148
- Area codes: 315 and 680
- FIPS code: 36-66322
- GNIS feature ID: 2746310
- Website: www.senecafalls.com

Seneca Falls is a hamlet and census-designated place in Seneca County, New York, United States. The population was 6,681 at the 2010 census. The 2020 census population of Seneca Falls CDP was 6,809. The hamlet is in the Town of Seneca Falls, east of Geneva. It was an incorporated village from 1831 to 2011.

Finger Lakes Regional Airport (0G7) is south of the hamlet.

Seneca Falls was the site of the Seneca Falls Convention, a foundational event in the Women's Rights Movement. The town is believed by some to have been the inspiration for the fictional town of "Bedford Falls, N.Y." portrayed in filmmaker Frank Capra's classic 1940s film "It's a Wonderful Life".

== History ==
=== Early history ===
The region was in the domain of the Cayuga tribe and visited by Jesuit missionaries in the 17th-century.

=== American Revolution and aftermath ===
The Cayuga were allies of the British and attacked American settlements from the outset of the revolution. The Sullivan Expedition of 1779 was sent to destroy native villages and kill the warriors.

After the war, the village and surrounding land became part of the Central New York Military Tract, land reserved for veterans of the war. The north end of Cayuga Lake was set aside as a reservation for returning Cayuga tribal members.

=== The early village ===
The first pioneers arrived around 1790. The first settlers chose the area for its easy access to water and close proximity to the Iroquois trail.

When the village was first incorporated in 1831, it was named after the series of small falls and rapids on the Seneca River which drains Seneca of the Finger Lakes. The river was partially canalized for navigation in 1818, and connected the lakes with the Erie Canal in 1828. The village was re-incorporated in 1837, 1860, and 1896 with new charters.

The New York State Barge Canal project in 1915 eliminated what remained of the rapids, canalizing the entire river and building a pair of locks to replace the three smaller locks which had made it possible for boat and barge traffic to pass through the village.

=== The growth of Seneca Falls through technology ===
The falls were also the cause of the village's existence, providing water power for mills, distilleries, tanneries, and other factories. By the mid 19th Century, Seneca Falls was the third largest flour milling center in the world, after Rochester and Oswego. There is still a small hydroelectric power generating station in the village.

A young man, Birdsall Holly, moved to Seneca Falls from Auburn to work as a mechanic in one of these mills. His son, Birdsall Holly Jr., was entranced by the water power, studying hydraulics and mechanics until he became one of the foremost American inventors. Holly became a partner in the Silsby Company, also called "The Island Works".

While working for this company, he obtained his first patent, which was for a rotary water pump. He later moved to Lockport, New York, where he continued inventing, but his work with pumps was continued by Seabury S. Gould Sr. who cast the first all-metal (cast iron) pump and founded Goulds Pumps, a worldwide pump manufacturer, which was the world's largest company dedicated to producing only pumps when it was taken over by ITT Technology in 1997.

While working for the Silsby Company, Holly also developed the rotary steam engine. This technology was married to the pump technology and was utilized in making the first successful steam fire engine. The Silsby Company eventually moved to Elmira, New York and became American LaFrance, famous for its fire engines.

=== Social movements in the village and surrounding area ===
Seneca Falls played a prominent role in the Women's Rights Movement. Elizabeth Cady Stanton, one of the organizers of the 1848 Seneca Falls Women's Rights Convention and recognized as "the philosopher and chief publicist of the radical wing of the 19th century women's rights movement", lived in Seneca Falls from 1847 to 1863. Amelia Bloomer, popularized a dress reform in her newspaper, The Lily, which became known as bloomers, a design believed to be influenced by native women of the area. Abolitionist causes against slavery were popular in Seneca Falls.

In August 1843, Abby Kelley, an outspoken abolitionist, came to Seneca Falls and addressed a crowd on the south side of the Seneca River. She confronted the nation and its institutions, including a local Presbyterian Church and its minister, over slavery. Within a year, a member of that church was found guilty of "disorderly and unchristian conduct" after she personally confronted that minister on the issue of slavery.

Early women's rights leaders Elizabeth Cady Stanton, Lucretia Coffin Mott, Martha Coffin Wright, Mary Ann M'Clintock and Jane Hunt hastily organized the Seneca Falls Convention, the first women's rights convention, held in 1848 at the Wesleyan Methodist Chapel. A "Declaration of Sentiments" was adopted, drafted by Stanton, M'Clintock and two adult M'Clintock daughters, which included support for women's suffrage. Frederick Douglass, a former slave and publisher of a Rochester, New York, abolitionist newspaper, attended the convention. His eloquent support for the women's suffrage resolution was instrumental in its passage. Nearby Waterloo was the planning location for the convention, which is commemorated by the Women's Rights National Historical Park in the two villages.

In July 1923 the National Woman's Party celebrated the 75th anniversary of the 1848 Seneca Falls convention with a pageant and pilgrimage to Susan B. Anthony’s grave in nearby Rochester, though Anthony did not attend in 1848. Alice Paul presented the draft of the Equal Rights Amendment, referred to as "the Lucretia Mott Amendment", for the delegates’ approval at the general conference held at the First Presbyterian Church in Seneca Falls.

The National Women's Hall of Fame was established in Seneca Falls in 1969. It honors American women for their contributions to society.

The first woman mayor of Seneca Falls was the village's last mayor. Diana M. Smith, first elected in 2004, was re-elected for a 2nd term in 2008. She would remain the mayor until the village was officially dissolved in 2011.

=== Dissolution ===
On March 16, 2010, Seneca Falls village residents voted to dissolve the village effective December 31, 2011. The village began investigating the possibility of dissolution in 2006, commissioning three different studies covering continuity of village services and disposition of village assets and debt. It was postulated that by dissolving the village, the average village property tax payer would save $950 a year. The final vote was 1,198 in favor, 1,112 opposed, and five blank ballots. It is, to date, the largest New York village ever to approve dissolution.

== Geography ==
Seneca Falls is located at 42°54′31″N 76°47′52″W (42.908713, -76.797986). According to the United States Census Bureau, the hamlet has a total area of 4.6 square miles (11.9 km^{2}), of which 4.4 square miles (11.5 km^{2}) is land and 0.2 square mile (0.4 km^{2}) (3.28%) is water.

Seneca Falls is intersected by conjoined U.S. Route 20 and New York State Route 5 (NY 5). NY 414 intersects both routes in the hamlet.

The Seneca River/Cayuga-Seneca Canal bisects the hamlet.

== Demographics ==
Historical population
Census	Pop.	Note	%±
2020	6,809		—
U.S. Decennial Census

As of the census of 2010, there were 6,681 people, 2,913 households, and 1,732 families residing in what was then a village. The population density was 1,518.4 inhabitants per square mile (586.3/km^{2}). The racial makeup of the village was 95.1% White, 1.2% Black or African American, 0.4% Native American, 1.6% Asian, 0.0% Pacific Islander, 0.4% from other races, and 1.3% from two or more races. Hispanic or Latino of any race were 1.7% of the population.

There were 2,913 households, out of which 24.9% had children under the age of 18 living with them, 42.7% were married couples living together, 11.8% had a female householder with no husband present, and 40.5% were non-families. 32.4% of all households were made up of individuals, and 13.2% had someone living alone who was 65 years of age or older. The average household size was 2.27 and the average family size was 2.85.

In the village, the population was spread out, with 22.8% under the age of 20, 7.1% from 20 to 24, 25.6% from 25 to 44, 28.0% from 45 to 64, and 16.5% who were 65 years of age or older. The median age was 41.0 years. For every 100 females, there were 95.5 males. For every 100 females age 18 and over, there were 92.8 males.

The median income for a household in the village was $43,947, and the median income for a family was $60,101. Males had a median income of $51,484 versus $36,385 for females. The per capita income for the village was $24,534. About 11.0% of families and 15.4% of the population were below the poverty line, including 15.3% of those under age 18 and 7.6% of those age 65 or over.

=== Housing ===
There were 3,131 housing units at an average density of 711.6 per square mile (274.8/km^{2}). 7.0% of housing units were vacant.

There were 2,913 occupied housing units in the village. 1,840 were owner-occupied units (63.2%), while 1,073 were renter-occupied (36.8%). The homeowner vacancy rate was 1.4% of total units. The rental unit vacancy rate was 6.7%.

== Notable people ==
- Elizabeth Cady Stanton, suffragist
- Matilda Joslyn Gage, suffragist
- George Dashiell Bayard, Union Army Brigadier General
- Ira Sprague Bowen, astronomer
- Frederick S. Armitage, cinema pioneer
- Jacob P. Chamberlain, former US Congressman
- Dave Giusti, Major League Baseball pitcher
- Norman J. Gould, former US Congressman
- William A. Sackett, former US Congressman
- Michael Nozzolio, former New York State Senator
- Judith Pipher, astrophysicist
- Bob Valesente, college and pro football coach
- Susan B Anthony, woman's rights activists
- Emil Bove, US Circuit Judge

== See also ==
- Mynderse Academy
- Seneca Falls Central School District
