= Samuel S. Freedman =

American lawyer and politician (1927–2012)

Member of the Connecticut House of Representatives from the 135th district
- In office 1973–1975
- Preceded by: Samuel Liskov
- Succeeded by: Paul C. Manchester

Personal details
- Born: July 5, 1927 Bridgeport, Connecticut, U.S.
- Died: November 4, 2012 (aged 85) Bridgeport, Connecticut, U.S.
- Party: Republican
- Education: George Washington University; Yale Law School

Samuel Sumner Freedman (July 5, 1927 – November 4, 2012) was an American jurist and legislator.

Freedman was born in Bridgeport, Connecticut. He served in the United States Navy from 1945 to 1951. Freedman graduated from George Washington University in 1948 and Yale Law School in 1954. Freedman was admitted to the Connecticut bar and practiced law in Bridgeport, Connecticut with his father. Freedman served in the Connecticut House of Representatives in 1973 and was a Republican. He then served as a judge on the Connecticut Superior Court from 1978 to 1997. Freedman died at St. Vincent's Medical Center in Bridgeport, Connecticut.

Freedman represented Easton, Weston and Westport in the state legislature in 1973 and 1974 where he chaired a subcommittee that authored legislation creating a public defender system in Connecticut.

== Notes ==
Connecticut House of Representatives
Preceded by Samuel "Sam" Liskov	Member of the Connecticut House of Representatives from the 135th district January 3, 1973–January 8, 1975	Succeeded by Paul C. Manchester
