= Paul Frame =

American ballet dancer and chiropractor

- Born: Charleston, West Virginia; United States
- Education: North Carolina School of the Arts; School of American Ballet; City College of New York; Northeast College of Health Sciences
- Occupation: Ballet dancer
- Career
- Former groups: Ohio Ballet; New York City Ballet

Paul E. Frame (born April 16, 1957) is an American chiropractor and retired ballet dancer. Frame danced as a member of the corps de ballet at New York City Ballet for ten years before retiring from the stage. He is currently the resident chiropractor for Ballet Arizona.

== Early life ==
Paul Frame was born in Charleston, West Virginia to Marvan and Mary Elizabeth Frame. As children, he and his twin brother Peter Frame took ballet lessons with Jerry Rose.

== Career ==
=== Ballet ===
Frame was a member of the corps de ballet of the New York City Ballet from 1979 to 1999.

The Frame brothers, Paul and Peter, were profiled in a 1981 book, Twins on Twins, written by Julie Szekely with photographs by Kathryn McLaughlin Abbe and Frances McLaughlin-Gill.

Frame was awarded a scholarship to attend North Carolina School of the Arts in Winston-Salem. After graduating from School of the Arts, he joined the Ohio Ballet. While dancing with the Ohio Ballet, Frame was offered a spot at the School of American Ballet in New York City on full-scholarship. He was chosen by George Balanchine to join the corps de ballet at New York City Ballet, where he danced for ten years. In 1983, Jennifer Dunning, dance reviewer for the New York Times, praised his "impassioned Mouse King" in The Nutcracker. He danced the role again in 1984. Dunning praised his "bold, clear dancing," in the sextet in the 1986 performance of Shadows, where she wrote that his dancing was a "highlight of the performance." In 1987, Dunning wrote that Frame "performed with a special radiance." In 1986, he danced in A Midsummer Night's Dream.

=== Chiropractic ===
Frame attended college at City College of New York. He graduated from Northeast College of Health Sciences in 1998 with a degree in Chiropractic and Physical Medicine Modalities and Therapeutic Procedures. He began his Chiropractic practice in Tempe, Arizona shortly after finishing school. He is the resident chiropractor for Ballet Arizona. He met the Ballet's Artistic Director, Ib Andersen, when both men were dancers with the New York City Ballet.
