= Alice Virginia Meyer =

American educator and politician (1921–2017)

- Meyer, c. 1976

Member of the Connecticut House of Representatives from the 135th district
- Preceded by: Paul Manchester
- Succeeded by: John Stripp

Personal details
- Born: Alice Virginia Kliemand; 1921 New York City, U.S.
- Died: May 17, 2017 (aged 95–96) Easton, Connecticut, U.S.
- Party: Republican
- Spouse: Theodore H. Meyer
- Children: 2
- Occupation: Educator, politician

Alice Virginia Meyer (née Kliemand; 1921 – May 12, 2017) was an American educator and politician who served as member of the Connecticut House of Representatives from the 135th district for the Republican Party between 1976 and 1993 being succeeded by John Stripp.

== Life ==
Meyer was born in 1921 in New York City to Martin Gotthard Kliemand (1892–1970) and Marguerite Helene Kliemand (née Houze; 1894–1976). She was of German and French ancestry, with three out of four grandparents born in Europe.
