= Connecticut's 78th House of Representatives district =

American legislative district

Connecticut's 78th State House of Representatives district
Representative
Joe Hoxha; R

Connecticut's 78th House of Representatives district elects one member of the Connecticut House of Representatives. It consists of the town of Plymouth and parts of Bristol and has been represented by Republican Joe Hoxha since 2022.

== List of representatives ==
Representative	Party	Years	District home	Note
John F. Papandrea	Democratic	1967 – 1973	Meriden	
Robert J. Vicino	Democratic	1973 – 1979	Bristol	Redistricted from the 34th District
Edward C. Krawiecki Jr.	Republican	1979 – 1995	Bristol	Served as Minority Leader of the Connecticut House of Representatives
William Hamzy	Republican	1995 – 2011	Terryville	
Whit Betts	Republican	2011 – 2022	Bristol	
Joe Hoxha	Republican	2022 – present	Bristol	

== Recent elections ==
=== 2020 ===
2020 Connecticut State House of Representatives election, District 78
Party	Candidate	Votes	%
Republican	Whit Betts (incumbent)	8,376	74.94
Independent Party	Aileen Abrams	2,801	25.06
Total votes		11,177	100.00
Republican hold			

=== 2018 ===
2018 Connecticut House of Representatives election, District 78
Party	Candidate	Votes	%
Republican	Whit Betts (Incumbent)	6,086	67.7
Democratic	Allen Marko	2,900	32.3
Total votes		8,986	100.00
Republican hold			

=== 2016 ===
2016 Connecticut House of Representatives election, District 78
Party	Candidate	Votes	%
Republican	Whit Betts (Incumbent)	7,028	62.98
Democratic	Krystal Myers	4,125	37.02
Total votes		11,143	100.00
Republican hold			

=== 2014 ===
2014 Connecticut House of Representatives election, District 78
Party	Candidate	Votes	%
Republican	Whit Betts (Incumbent)	4,754	61.6
Democratic	Dan Santorso	2,393	31.0
Independent Party	Whit Betts (Incumbent)	327	4.2
Working Families	Dan Santorso	242	3.1
Total votes		11,143	100.00
Republican hold			

=== 2012 ===
2012 Connecticut House of Representatives election, District 78
Party	Candidate	Votes	%
Republican	Whit Betts (Incumbent)	5,908	60.0
Democratic	Dan Santorso	3,582	36.4
Working Families	George Langer	360	3.7
Total votes		9,850	100.00
Republican hold			
