= David Labriola =

American politician

Judge of Probate for Region 22
- Incumbent
- Assumed office January 8, 2025
- Preceded by: Domenick N. Calabrese

Member of the Connecticut House of Representatives from the 131st district
- In office January 8, 2003 – January 8, 2025
- Preceded by: Ronald San Angelo
- Succeeded by: Arnold Jensen

Personal details
- Born: September 9, 1960 (age 66) Naugatuck, Connecticut, U.S.
- Party: Republican
- Education: Yale University (BA); University of Connecticut, Hartford (JD)

David Labriola (born September 9, 1960) is an American politician and judge currently serving on the Region 22 Probate Court with jurisdiction over the towns of Bethlehem, Oxford, Roxbury, Southbury, Washington, Watertown, and Woodbury.

Labriola was elected to the court in 2024, after running unopposed as a Republican in a special election to replace Domenick N. Calabrese, who was soon to be 70 years old, the mandatory retirement age for judges in Connecticut.

He previously served in the Connecticut House of Representatives from the 131st district from 2003 to 2025.

He is the son of Jerry Labriola.
