= Connecticut's 135th House of Representatives district =

American legislative district

Connecticut's 135th State House of Representatives district
Representative
Anne Hughes; D–Easton

Connecticut's 135th House of Representatives district elects one member of the Connecticut House of Representatives. Its current representative is Anne Hughes. Before 2002, the district contained the towns of Easton, Redding and parts of Newtown and Weston; boundary changes which took effect for the 2002 election removed Newtown and part of Redding from the district and added the remaining portion of Weston. The 135th District was a safe Republican seat in the House, in part due to the lack of Democratic opposition, but an increased Democratic Party presence in recent years has changed this.

== List of representatives ==
Representative	Party	Years	District home	Note
Samuel "Sam" Liskov	Democratic	1967 – 1973	Bridgeport	Redistricted to the 131st District
Samuel S. Freedman	Republican	1973 – 1975	Westport	
Paul C. Manchester	Republican	1975 – 1976	Westport	Died in office.
Alice Virginia Meyer	Republican	1976 – 1993	Easton	
John Stripp	Republican	1993 – 2011	Weston	Did not seek reelection
John Shaban	Republican	2011 – 2017	Redding	
Adam Dunsby	Republican	2017 – 2019	Easton	Simultaneously served as First Selectman of Easton. Lost re-election
Anne Hughes	Democratic	2019 – present	Redding	Incumbent

== Recent elections ==
State Election 2018: House District 135
Party	Candidate	Votes	%
Democratic	Anne Hughes	6,449	52.82%
Working Families	Anne Hughes	118	0.97%
Total	Anne Hughes	6,567	53.79%
Republican	Adam Dunsby (incumbent)	5,393	44.17%
Independent Party	Adam Dunsby (incumbent)	183	1.50%
Total	Adam Dunsby (incumbent)	5,576	45.67%
Green	Michael Pitassi	66	0.54%
Total votes		13,487	100.00%
Democratic hold			

State Election 2016: House District 135
Party	Candidate	Votes	%
Republican	Adam Dunsby	6,934	51.41%
Independent Party	Adam Dunsby	252	1.87%
Total	Adam Dunsby (incumbent)	7,186	53.28%
Democratic	Bonnie Troy	6,001	44.49%
Green	Bonnie Troy	300	2.22%
Total	Bonnie Troy	6,301	46.72%
Total votes		13,487	100.00%
Republican hold			

State Election 2014: House District 135
Party	Candidate	Votes	%	±%
Republican	John T. Shaban	5,578	81.3	+28.9
Green	Bonnie E. Troy	1,287	18.7	+16.1
Majority				
Turnout		6,865		
Republican hold		Swing		

State Election 2012: House District 135
Party	Candidate	Votes	%	±%
Republican	John T. Shaban	6,588	52.4	−4.0
Democratic	Leon J. Karvelis	5,661	45	+3.2
Green	Gabriel B. Rossi	326	2.6	+0.8
Majority				
Turnout		12,575		
Republican hold		Swing		

State Election 2010: House District 135
Party	Candidate	Votes	%	±%
Republican	John T. Shaban	5,715	56.4	−25.6
Democratic	Carl D. Bernstein	4,240	41.8	+41.8
Green	Gabriel B. Rossi	184	1.8	−16.2
Majority		1,475	14.5	−49.6
Turnout		10,139		
Republican hold		Swing	-33.7	

State Election 2008: House District 135
Party	Candidate	Votes	%	±%
Republican	John Stripp	8,139	82.0	−6.3
Green	Remy G. Chevalier	1,782	18.0	+6.3
Majority		6,357	64.1	−12.5
Turnout		9,921		
Republican hold		Swing	-6.3	

State Election 2006: House District 135
Party	Candidate	Votes	%	±%
Republican	John Stripp	5,711	88.3	+6.0
Green	Nancy Burton	758	11.7	−6.0
Majority		4,953	76.6	+13.0
Turnout		6,469		
Republican hold		Swing	+6.0	

State Election 2004: House District 135
Party	Candidate	Votes	%	±%
Republican	John Stripp	7,653	82.3	−17.7
Green	Nancy Burton	1,649	17.7	+17.7
Majority		5,914	63.6	−36.4
Turnout		9,302		
Republican hold		Swing	-17.7	

State Election 2002: House District 135
Party	Candidate	Votes	%	±%
Republican	John Stripp	5,570	100.0	0.0
Majority		5,570	100.0	0.0
Turnout		5,570		
Republican hold		Swing	0.0	

State Election 2000: House District 135
Party	Candidate	Votes	%	±%
Republican	John Stripp	8,029	100.0	0.0
Majority		8,029	100.0	0.0
Turnout		8,029		
Republican hold		Swing	0.0	

State Election 1998: House District 135
Party	Candidate	Votes	%	±%
Republican	John Stripp	5,582	100.0	
Majority		5,582	100.0	
Turnout		5,582		
Republican hold		Swing		
