= Arnold Jensen =

American politician

Member of the Connecticut House of Representatives from the 131st district
- Incumbent
- Assumed office January 8, 2025
- Preceded by: David Labriola

Personal details
- Born: 1959 (age 66–67)
- Party: Republican
- Education: Stony Brook University

Arnold Jensen is an American politician and member of the Connecticut House of Representatives since 2024 from the 131st district, which contains Oxford and parts of Southbury and Naugatuck.
