= Ronald San Angelo =

American politician

Member of the Connecticut House of Representatives from the 131st district
- In office January 6, 1993 – January 8, 2003
- Preceded by: Richard Foley Jr.
- Succeeded by: David Labriola

Personal details
- Born: November 24, 1962 (age 63)
- Party: Republican

Ronald San Angelo (born November 24, 1962) is an American politician who served in the Connecticut House of Representatives from the 131st district from 1993 to 2003.
