= John Shaban =

American politician (born 1964)

Member of the Connecticut House of Representatives from the 135th district
- In office 2011–2017
- Preceded by: John Stripp
- Succeeded by: Adam Dunsby

Personal details
- Born: John Thomas Shaban; September 6, 1964 (age 62) Brooklyn, New York, U.S.
- Party: Republican
- Spouse: Lucy Eliza Shaban
- Children: 3
- Education: University of Colorado Boulder
- Website: shabanforcongress.com

John Thomas Shaban (born September 6, 1964) is an American politician and attorney. A member of the Republican Party, Shaban served in the Connecticut House of Representatives until 2017, representing the 135th District, which encompasses the communities of Easton, Redding, and Weston.

== Early life and education ==
Shaban attended the University of Colorado Boulder. He earned his A.B.A. Environmental Law Certificate from the Elisabeth Haub School of Law at Pace University in New York in 1993. He was a semi-professional football player from 1985 to 1989 and from 1994 to 2006.

== Career ==
=== Professional career ===
He has worked professionally as a fact finder/arbitrator for the Connecticut Judicial Branch and an arbitrator for the Financial Industry Regulatory Authority (FINRA). Between 2003 and 2018, Shaban has been a partner of the Litigation Department at Whitman, Breed, Abbott & Morgan, LLP. He is currently a partner of Levine & Levine PLLC, a law firm based out of Poughkeepsie, New York, where he leads the Connecticut office. He is admitted to the bar in New York and Connecticut.

=== Political career ===
Shaban was the ranking member of the Connecticut legislature's Environment Committee as well as a member of both the Judiciary Committee and the Finance, Revenue and Bonding Committee.

In 2013, Shaban supported the Mental Health, School Security and Gun Control bill.

Shaban ran for the United States House of Representatives to represent Connecticut's 4th congressional district in the 2014 elections, challenging incumbent Jim Himes of the Democratic Party. He withdrew from the race, and in 2015 declared his candidacy against Himes in the 2016 elections. Shaban received the Republican nomination, but Himes defeated him in the general election, 60%-40%.

== Personal life ==
Shaban is married to Lucy Eliza Shaban (b. 1965) and has three children.

He resides in Redding, Connecticut.
