= Seneca Falls, New York =

Seneca Falls
- Town
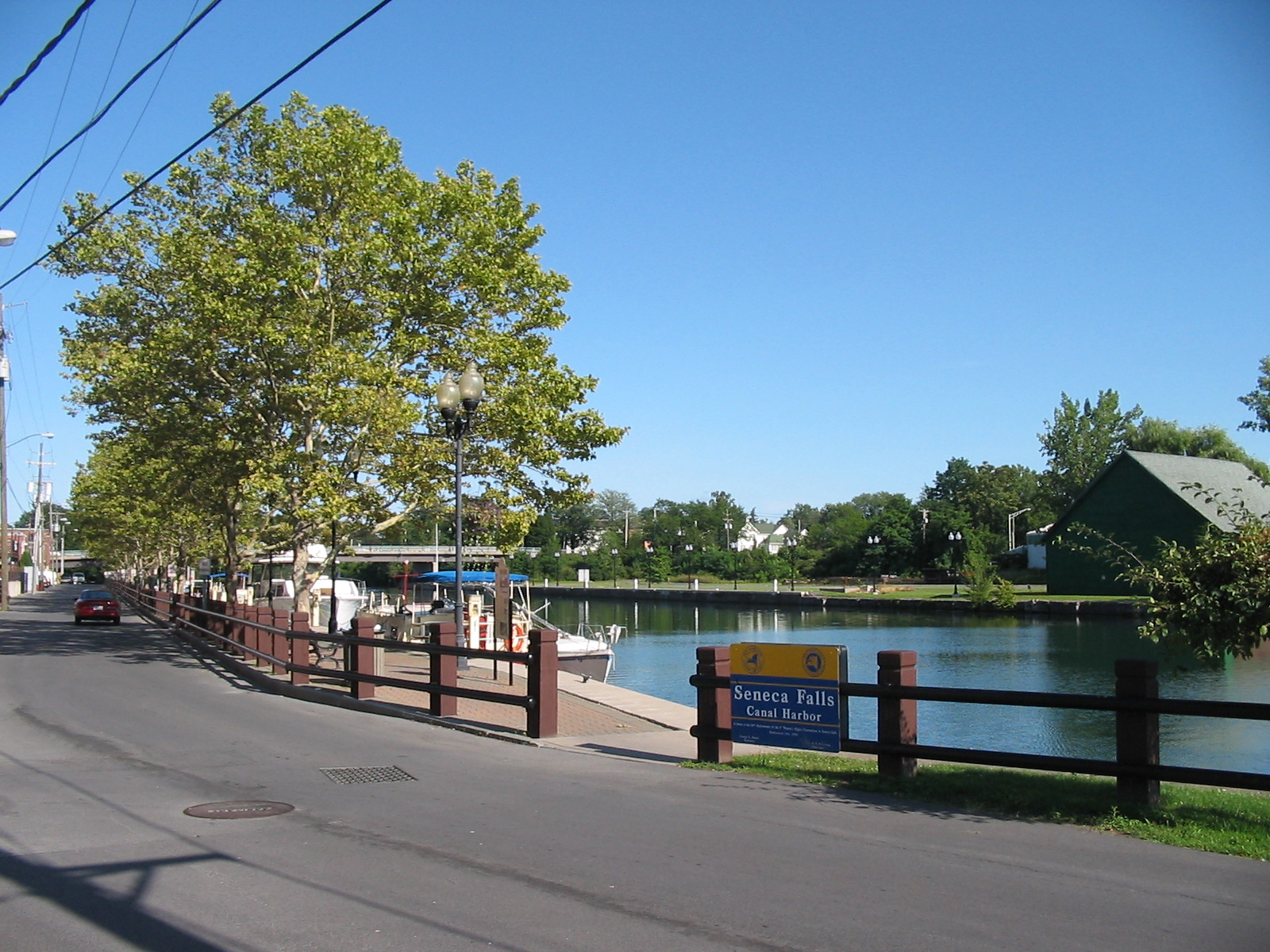
- Seneca Falls Canal Harbor

- Location within the state of New York
- Coordinates: 42°54′31″N 76°47′53″W
- Country: United States
- State: New York
- County: Seneca
- Settled: 1790; 236 years ago
- Established: March 26, 1829; 197 years ago

Government
  - Type: Town Council
  - Supervisor: Michael Ferrara
  - Clerk: Nicaletta Greer
  - Court: Justice Charles Lafler; Justice Steven Kelley

Area
  - Total: 27.46 sq mi (71.12 km^{2})
  - Land: 24.22 sq mi (62.72 km^{2})
  - Water: 3.24 sq mi (8.40 km^{2})
- Elevation: 449 ft (137 m)

Population (2020)
  - Total: 9,027
  - Estimate (2022): 8,940
  - Density: 372.8/sq mi (143.92/km^{2})
- Time zone: UTC-5 (Eastern (EST))
  - Summer (DST): UTC-4 (EDT)
- ZIP code: 13148
- Area codes: 315 and 680
- FIPS code: 36-66333
- GNIS feature ID: 0964826
- Website: https://senecafalls.gov/

Seneca Falls is a town in Seneca County, New York, United States. The population was 9,027 at the 2020 census.

The Town of Seneca Falls contains the former village also called Seneca Falls. The town is east of Geneva, New York, in the northern part of the Finger Lakes District.

Seneca Falls is a historic location along a branch of the Erie Canal and is often association with women's rights in the United States due to the 1848 Seneca Falls convention, which produced the Declaration of Rights and Sentiments. This event was looked back upon by women's rights activists in the later 19th and early 20th centuries as a "birth" or "beginning" of women's rights in the United States. Modern historians such as Lisa Tetrault have cast doubt on that assertion and many key myths, including issues as mundane as the mere presence of Susan B. Anthony. Tetrault and modern scholars still argue the event was nonetheless deeply significant for the attention it garnered among the general American populace.

It is also believed to have been the inspiration for the fictional town of "Bedford Falls", portrayed in filmmaker Frank Capra's classic 1946 film It's a Wonderful Life.

== History ==
The region is the former realm of the Cayuga tribe, who were visited by Jesuit missionaries during the 17th century. Cayuga villages were attacked and destroyed by the Sullivan Expedition of 1779 in retaliation for plundering and killing new colonists.

The region became part of the Central New York Military Tract, reserved for veterans, after the conclusion of the American Revolution.

A canal was completed in 1818 allowing transit between Seneca Lake and Cayuga Lake. This canal was connected to the Erie Canal in 1828.

The town was established in 1829 from part of the Town of Junius. The community of Seneca Falls in the town set itself apart by incorporating as a village in 1831.

The Seneca Falls Convention held July 19–20, 1848, was the first women's rights convention organized by women explicitly for the purpose of discussing women's rights as such.

On March 16, 2010, the people of the Village of Seneca Falls voted to dissolve the village into the Town of Seneca Falls, effective in 2012.

Goulds Pumps, a leading manufacturer of pumps, is headquartered in Seneca Falls.

== Geography ==
According to the United States Census Bureau, the town has a total area of 27.4 square miles (71 km^{2}), of which 24.2 square miles (63 km^{2}) is land and 3.2 square miles (8.3 km^{2}), comprising 11.81%, is water.

The east town line is partly defined by Cayuga Lake. The Seneca River/Cayuga-Seneca Canal passes across the town. More recently, efforts are underway to complete a scenic trail along the historic canal. The eastern section of the town is part of Montezuma Marsh, an extensive wetland at the north end of Cayuga Lake.

Conjoined US Route 20 and NY-5 form an east–west highway across the town. New York State Route 89 is a north–south highway by the shore of Cayuga Lake. New York State Route 414 is also a north–south highway, but has an east–west orientation while conjoined with US-20 and NY-5. New York State Route 318 intersects US-20/NY-5 in the northeast corner of the town.

== Demographics ==
Historical population
Census	Pop.	Note	%±
1830	2,602		—
1840	4,281		64.5%
1850	4,296		0.4%
1860	5,960		38.7%
1870	6,860		15.1%
1880	6,853		−0.1%
1890	6,901		0.7%
1900	7,305		5.9%
1910	7,407		1.4%
1920	7,179		−3.1%
1930	7,166		−0.2%
1940	7,352		2.6%
1950	7,845		6.7%
1960	9,264		18.1%
1970	9,900		6.9%
1980	9,886		−0.1%
1990	9,384		−5.1%
2000	9,347		−0.4%
2010	9,040		−3.3%
2020	9,027		−0.1%
2022 (est.)	8,940	▼	−1.0%
U.S. Decennial Census

As of 2010 Seneca Falls had a population of 9,040. The ethnic and racial makeup of the population was 93.6% non-Hispanic white, 1.3% African-American, 0.4% Native American, 0.3% Indian, 1.3% other Asian, 0.2% non-Hispanic from some other race, 1.4% from two or more races, 1.0% Puerto Rican and 0.7% other Hispanics.

As of the census of 2000, there were 9,347 people, 3,796 households, and 2,440 families residing in the town. The population density was 385.6 inhabitants per square mile (148.9/km^{2}). There were 4,167 housing units at an average density of 171.9 per square mile (66.4/km^{2}). The racial makeup of the town was 95.86% White, 0.87% Black or African American, 0.22% Native American, 1.52% Asian, 0.30% from other races, and 1.23% from two or more races. Hispanic or Latino of any race were 1.33% of the population.

There were 3,796 households, out of which 29.8% had children under the age of 18 living with them, 49.0% were married couples living together, 10.9% had a female householder with no husband present, and 35.7% were non-families. 28.4% of all households were made up of individuals, and 12.1% had someone living alone who was 65 years of age or older. The average household size was 2.38 and the average family size was 2.91.

The town's population was spread out, with 23.6% under the age of 18, 8.5% from 18 to 24, 30.3% from 25 to 44, 21.9% from 45 to 64, and 15.8% who were 65 years of age or older. The median age was 37 years. For every 100 females, there were 98.0 males. For every 100 females age 18 and over, there were 94.7 males.

The median income for a household in the town was $37,245, and the median income for a family was $48,565. Males had a median income of $36,631 versus $25,094 for females. The per capita income for the town was $18,462. About 9.7% of families and 13.2% of the population were below the poverty line, including 14.4% of those under age 18 and 8.4% of those age 65 or over.

== Communities and locations ==
- Bridgeport – A lakeside hamlet east of Seneca Falls CDP on NY-89.
- Cayuga Lake State Park – A state park on the shore of Cayuga Lake.
- Finger Lakes Regional Airport (0G7) – A general aviation airport southeast of Seneca Falls CDP.
- Halsey Corner – A location in the northeast corner of the town on US-20/NY-5.
- Lehigh Valley Junction – A hamlet north of Seneca Falls CDP.
- Montezuma National Wildlife Refuge – A federal conservation area partly in the eastern end of the town.
- Montezuma Wildlife Management Area – A state conservation area in the east of the town.
- Nichols Corner – A location on the north town line on NY-318.
- Seneca Falls – The CDP of Seneca Falls at US-20/NY-5 and NY-414, formerly an incorporated village.
- Women's Rights National Historical Park – A unit of the National Park System administered by the National Park Service

== Schools ==
=== Public schools ===
==== Seneca Falls Central School District ====
The public school system for Seneca Falls and its nearby villages is provided by the Seneca Falls Central School District. This district has four schools. The current superintendent is Michelle Reed.

- Frank M. Knight Elementary School is a public school which handles grades K-2 in the Seneca Falls Central School District. It has an enrollment of about 300 students. The current principal is Janet Clendenen.
- Elizabeth Cady Stanton School is a public school which handles grades 3–5. It has an enrollment of about 300 students. The current principal is Amy Hibbard.
- Seneca Falls Middle School is a public school which handles grades 6–8. Enrollment is around 350 students. The current principal is Kevin Rhinehart.
- Mynderse Academy is a public school which handles grades 9–12. The enrollment is around 511 students as of 2006. The current principal is Faith Lewis.

=== Private schools ===
- Finger Lakes Christian School (FLCS) is a private Christian Pre-K through 12th grade school in Seneca Falls. Established in 1990, the school enrolls approximately 100 students.

== Colleges ==
- Northeast College of Health Sciences Moving from Long Island, New York, in the fall of 1991, then known as New York Chiropractic College (NYCC), opened at this site after purchasing the vacant Eisenhower College campus from the state, who controlled the closed campus.

== Transportation ==
New York State Route 5 and U.S. Route 20 run east–west through the town.

- RTS Seneca (formerly Seneca Transit Service) serves Seneca County with a focus on Geneva, Seneca Falls, and Waterloo. Additional service also operates on a less frequent schedule as far south as Interlaken and Lodi.
