= Connecticut's 131st House of Representatives district =

American legislative district

Connecticut's 131st State House of Representatives district
Representative
Arnold Jensen; R

Connecticut's 131st House of Representatives district elects one member of the Connecticut House of Representatives. It encompasses parts of Naugatuck and has been represented by Republican Arnold Jensen since 2025.

== List of representatives ==
Representative	Party	Years	District home	Note
Thomas E. O'Brien	Democratic	1967 – 1973	Bridgeport	
Samuel "Sam" Liskov	Democratic	1973 – 1977	Bridgeport	Redistricted from the 135th District
John H. Murphy	Democratic	1977 – 1983	Bridgeport	
Richard Foley, Jr.	Republican	1983 – 1993	Oxford	Also served as Chairman of the Connecticut Republican Party
Ronald San Angelo	Republican	1993 – 2003	Naugatuck	Unsuccessfully ran for Secretary of the State of Connecticut
David Labriola	Republican	2003 – 2025	Oxford	
Arnold Jensen	Republican	2025 – present	Oxford	

== Recent elections ==
=== 2020 ===
2020 Connecticut State House of Representatives election, District 131
Party	Candidate	Votes	%
Republican	David Labriola (incumbent)	10,295	100.00
Republican hold			

=== 2018 ===
2018 Connecticut House of Representatives election, District 131
Party	Candidate	Votes	%
Republican	David Labriola (Incumbent)	7,048	67.6
Democratic	Jams Krocho	3,371	32.4
Total votes		10,419	100.00
Republican hold			

=== 2016 ===
2016 Connecticut House of Representatives election, District 131
Party	Candidate	Votes	%
Republican	David Labriola (Incumbent)	8,073	68.48
Democratic	Scott Flaherty	3,716	31.62
Total votes		11,789	100.00
Republican hold			

=== 2014 ===
2014 Connecticut House of Representatives election, District 131
Party	Candidate	Votes	%
Republican	David Labriola (Incumbent)	6,067	100.00
Total votes		6,067	100.00
Republican hold			

=== 2012 ===
2012 Connecticut House of Representatives election, District 131
Party	Candidate	Votes	%
Republican	David Labriola (Incumbent)	8,323	100.00
Total votes		8,323	100.00
Republican hold			
