= 2016 United States House of Representatives elections in Connecticut =

- November 8, 2016

All 5 Connecticut seats to the United States House of Representatives
	Majority party	Minority party
Party	Democratic	Republican
Last election	5	0
Seats won	5	0
Seat change	Steady	Steady
Popular vote	990,139	568,134
Percentage	62.86%	36.07%
Swing	▲6.63%	▼2.28%

Democratic
40–50%
50–60%
60–70%
70–80%
80–90%
90–100%
Republican
40–50%
50–60%
60–70%
Tie
40–50%

The 2016 United States House of Representatives elections in Connecticut were held on Tuesday, November 8, 2016 to elect the five U.S. representatives from the state of Connecticut, one from each of the state's five congressional districts. The elections coincided with the 2016 U.S. presidential election, as well as other elections to the House of Representatives, elections to the United States Senate and various state and local elections. The primaries were held on August 9.

== Overview ==
The table below shows the total number and percentage of votes, as well as the number of seats won by each political party in the election for the United States House of Representatives in Connecticut.

United States House of Representatives elections in Connecticut, 2016
Party	Votes	Percentage	Seats
Democratic	916,815	58.2%	5
Republican	558,162	35.4%	0
Working Families Party	73,324	4.7%	0
Green Party	11,895	0.8%	0
Independent Party of Connecticut	9,972	0.6%	0
Libertarian	4,949	0.3%	0
Others	66	< 0.0%	0
Total	1,575,183	100.0%	5

- The Democratic candidates were cross-endorsed by the Connecticut Working Families Party in the First, Second, Third and Fifth Districts
- The Republican candidates were cross-endorsed by the Independent Party of Connecticut in the Fourth and Fifth Districts

=== By district ===
Results of the 2016 United States House of Representatives elections in Connecticut by district:

District	Democratic		Republican		Others†		Total		Result
District	Votes	%	Votes	%	Votes	%	Votes	%	Result
District 1	200,686*	64.1%	105,674	33.8%	6,565	2.1%	312,925	100.0%	Democratic hold
District 2	208,818*	63.2%	111,149	33.7%	10,290	3.1%	330,257	100.0%	Democratic hold
District 3	213,572*	69.0%	95,786	31.0%	21	0.0%	309,379	100.0%	Democratic hold
District 4	187,811	59.9%	125,724*	40.1%	5	0.0%	313,5400	100.0%	Democratic hold
District 5	179,252*	58.0%	129,801*	42.0%	29	0.0%	309,082	100.0%	Democratic hold
Total	990,139*	62.86%	568,134*	36.07%	16,910	1.07%	1,575,183	100.0%	

- * Includes votes for major party candidates on more than one party line
- † Does not include fusion vote counts—see individual districts for details

== District 1 ==
2016 Connecticut's 1st congressional district election
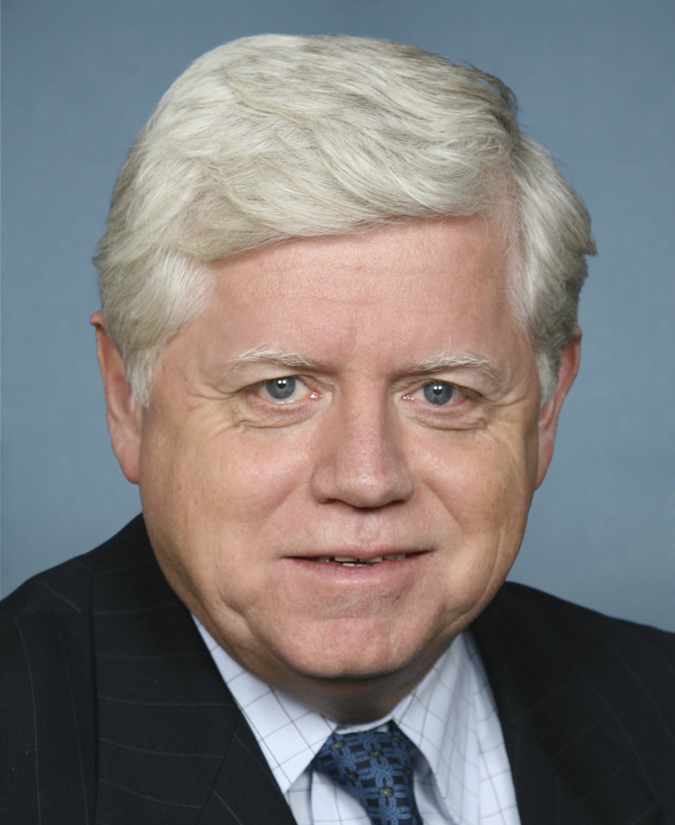

Nominee	John B. Larson	Matthew Corey
Party	Democratic	Republican
Alliance	Working Families
Popular vote	200,686	105,674
Percentage	64.1%	33.8%
- Municipality results Larson 50–60% 60–70% 70–80% 80–90% >90% Corey 40–50% 50–60% 60–70% Tie 40–50%
U.S. Representative before election
John B. Larson
Democratic
Elected U.S. Representative
John B. Larson
Democratic

Incumbent Democrat John B. Larson, who had represented the district since 1999, ran for re-election. He was re-elected with 58% of the vote in 2014. The district had a PVI of D+13.

=== Democratic primary ===
==== Candidates ====
===== Nominee =====
- John B. Larson, incumbent U.S. Representative

=== Republican primary ===
==== Candidates ====
===== Nominee =====
- Matthew Corey, business owner, nominee for this seat in 2014 and Independent candidate for this seat in 2012

=== General election ===
==== Predictions ====
Source	Ranking	As of
The Cook Political Report	Safe D	November 7, 2016
Daily Kos Elections	Safe D	November 7, 2016
Rothenberg	Safe D	November 3, 2016
Sabato's Crystal Ball	Safe D	November 7, 2016
RCP	Safe D	October 31, 2016

==== Results ====
Connecticut’s 1st congressional district, 2016
Party	Candidate	Votes	%
Democratic	John B. Larson	187,021	59.8
Working Families	John B. Larson	13,365	4.4
Total	John B. Larson (incumbent)	200,686	64.1
Republican	Matthew M. Corey	105,674	33.8
Green	S. Michael DeRosa	6,563	2.1
Independent	Charles Jackson (write-in)	1	< 0.0
Independent	Mark Stewart (write-in)	1	< 0.0
Total votes		312,925	100.0
Democratic hold			

== District 2 ==
2016 Connecticut's 2nd congressional district election
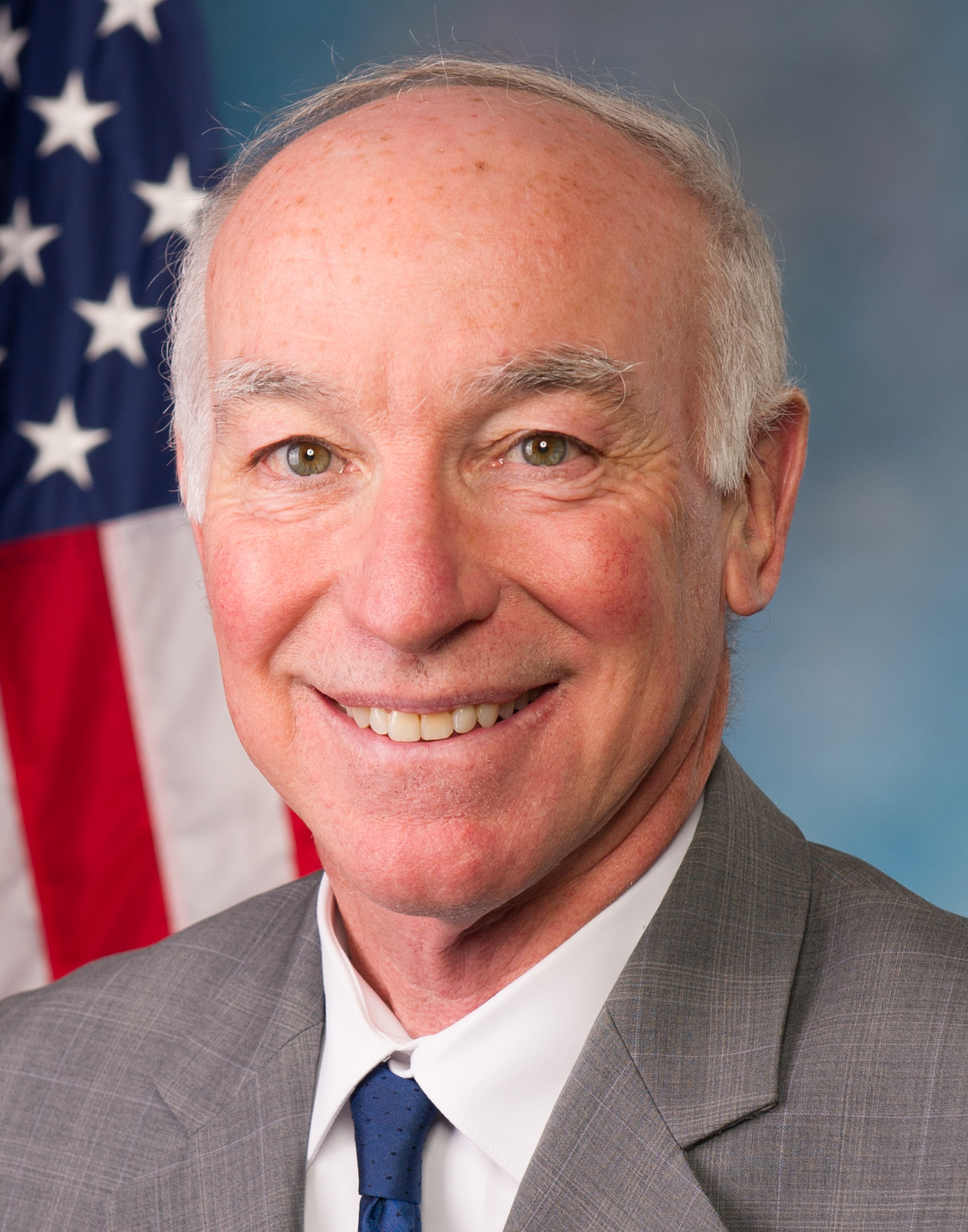

Nominee	Joe Courtney	Daria Novak
Party	Democratic	Republican
Alliance	Working Families
Popular vote	208,818	111,149
Percentage	63.2%	33.7%
- Municipality results Courtney 50–60% 60–70% 70–80% 80–90%
U.S. Representative before election
Joe Courtney
Democratic
Elected U.S. Representative
Joe Courtney
Democratic

Incumbent Democrat Joe Courtney, who had represented the district since 2007, ran for re-election. He was re-elected with 62% of the vote in 2014. The district had a PVI of D+5.

=== Democratic primary ===
==== Candidates ====
===== Nominee =====
- Joe Courtney, incumbent U.S. Representative

=== Republican primary ===
==== Candidates ====
===== Nominee =====
- Daria Novak, radio-TV talk show host, business consultant, former State Department employee and candidate for this seat in 2010 & 2012

===== Withdrawn =====
- Ann Brookes, member of the Westbrook Republican Town Committee

=== Green primary ===
==== Candidates ====
===== Nominee =====
- Jonathan Pelto, former Democratic state representative

=== Libertarian primary ===
==== Candidates ====
===== Nominee =====
- Daniel Reale, nominee for this seat in 2012 and 2014

=== General election ===
==== Predictions ====
Source	Ranking	As of
The Cook Political Report	Safe D	November 7, 2016
Daily Kos Elections	Safe D	November 7, 2016
Rothenberg	Safe D	November 3, 2016
Sabato's Crystal Ball	Safe D	November 7, 2016
RCP	Safe D	October 31, 2016

==== Results ====
Connecticut’s 2nd congressional district, 2016
Party	Candidate	Votes	%
Democratic	Joe Courtney	186,210	56.4
Working Families	Joe Courtney	22,608	6.8
Total	Joe Courtney (incumbent)	208,818	63.2
Republican	Daria Novak	111,149	33.7
Green	Jonathan Pelto	5,332	1.6
Libertarian	Daniel Reale	4,949	1.5
Independent	Elizabeth F. Traceski (write-in)	9	< 0.0
Total votes		330,257	100.0
Democratic hold			

== District 3 ==
2016 Connecticut's 3rd congressional district election
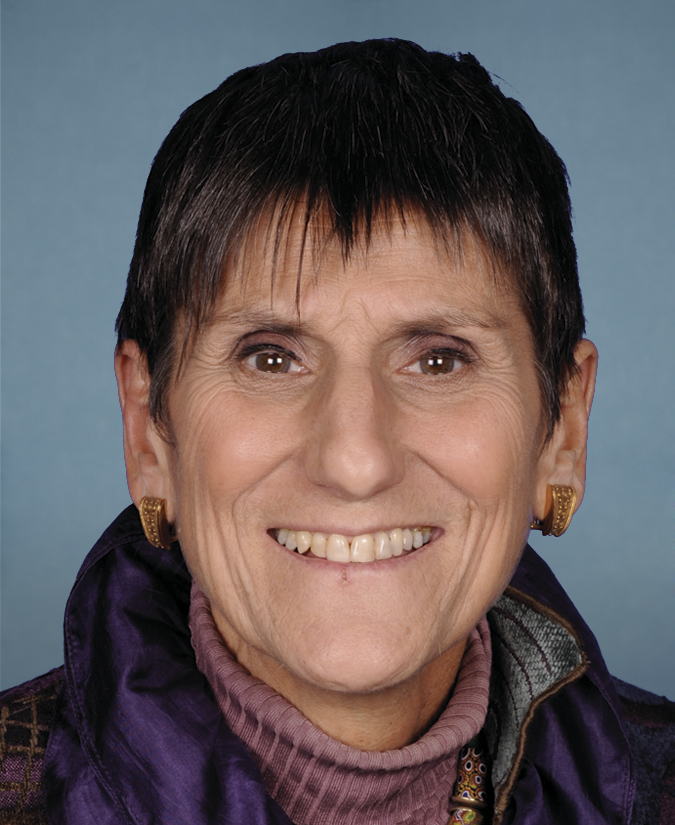

Nominee	Rosa DeLauro	Angel Cadena
Party	Democratic	Republican
Alliance	Working Families
Popular vote	207,515	95,786
Percentage	69.0%	31.0%
- Municipality results DeLauro: 50–60% 60–70% 70–80% >90% Cadena: 50–60%
U.S. Representative before election
Rosa DeLauro
Democratic
Elected U.S. Representative
Rosa DeLauro
Democratic

Incumbent Democrat Rosa DeLauro, who had represented the district since 1991, ran for re-election. She was re-elected with 67% of the vote in 2014. The district had a PVI of D+11.

=== Democratic primary ===
==== Candidates ====
===== Nominee =====
- Rosa DeLauro, incumbent U.S. Representative

=== Republican primary ===
==== Candidates ====
===== Nominee =====
- Angel Cadena, former legislative intern and candidate for State Comptroller in 2014

=== General election ===
==== Predictions ====
Source	Ranking	As of
The Cook Political Report	Safe D	November 7, 2016
Daily Kos Elections	Safe D	November 7, 2016
Rothenberg	Safe D	November 3, 2016
Sabato's Crystal Ball	Safe D	November 7, 2016
RCP	Safe D	October 31, 2016

==== Results ====
Connecticut’s 3rd congressional district, 2016
Party	Candidate	Votes	%
Democratic	Rosa DeLauro	192,274	62.1
Working Families	Rosa DeLauro	21,298	6.9
Total	Rosa DeLauro (incumbent)	213,572	69.0
Republican	Angel Cadena	95,786	31.0
Independent	Christopher Schaefer (write-in)	18	< 0.0
Independent	Andrew Rule (write-in)	3	< 0.0
Total votes		309,379	100.0
Democratic hold			

== District 4 ==
2016 Connecticut's 4th congressional district election
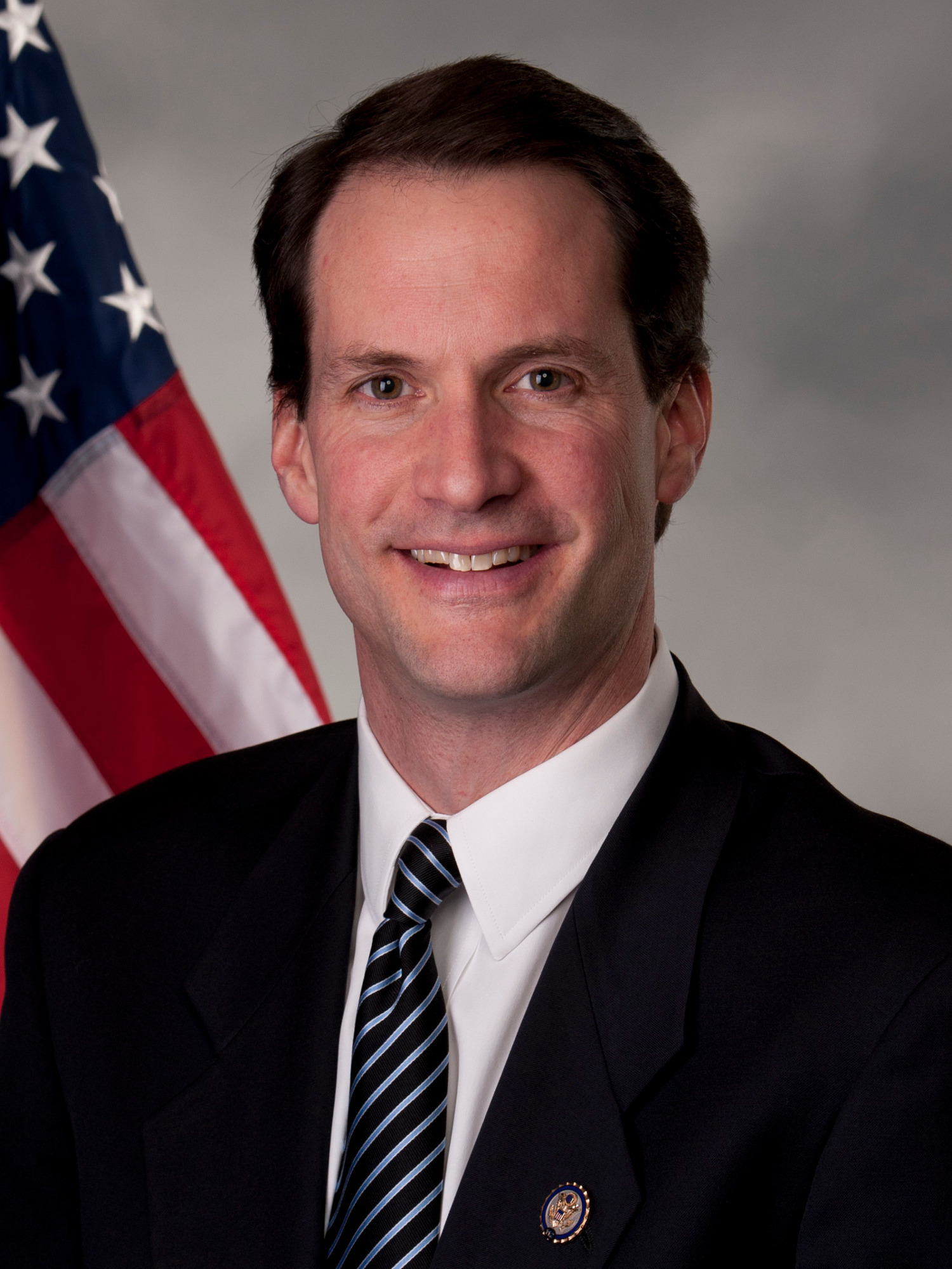

Nominee	Jim Himes	John Shaban
Party	Democratic	Republican
Alliance		Independent Party
Popular vote	187,811	125,724
Percentage	59.9%	40.1%
- Municipality results Himes: 50–60% 60–70% 70–80% 80–90% Shaban: 50–60% 60–70%
U.S. Representative before election
Jim Himes
Democratic
Elected U.S. Representative
Jim Himes
Democratic

Incumbent Democrat Jim Himes, who had represented the district since 2009, ran for re-election. He was re-elected with 51% of the vote in 2014. The district had a PVI of D+5.

=== Democratic primary ===
==== Candidates ====
===== Nominee =====
- Jim Himes, incumbent U.S. Representative

=== Republican primary ===
==== Candidates ====
===== Nominee =====
- John Shaban, state representative

=== General election ===
==== Predictions ====
Source	Ranking	As of
The Cook Political Report	Safe D	November 7, 2016
Daily Kos Elections	Safe D	November 7, 2016
Rothenberg	Safe D	November 3, 2016
Sabato's Crystal Ball	Safe D	November 7, 2016
RCP	Safe D	October 31, 2016

==== Results ====
Connecticut’s 4th congressional district, 2016
Party	Candidate	Votes	%
Democratic	Jim Himes (incumbent)	187,811	59.9
Republican	John Shaban	120,653	38.5
Independent Party	John Shaban	5,071	1.6
Total	John Shaban	125,724	40.1
Independent	Carl E. Vassar (write-in)	5	< 0.0
Total votes		313,540	100.0
Democratic hold			

== District 5 ==
2016 Connecticut's 5th congressional district election
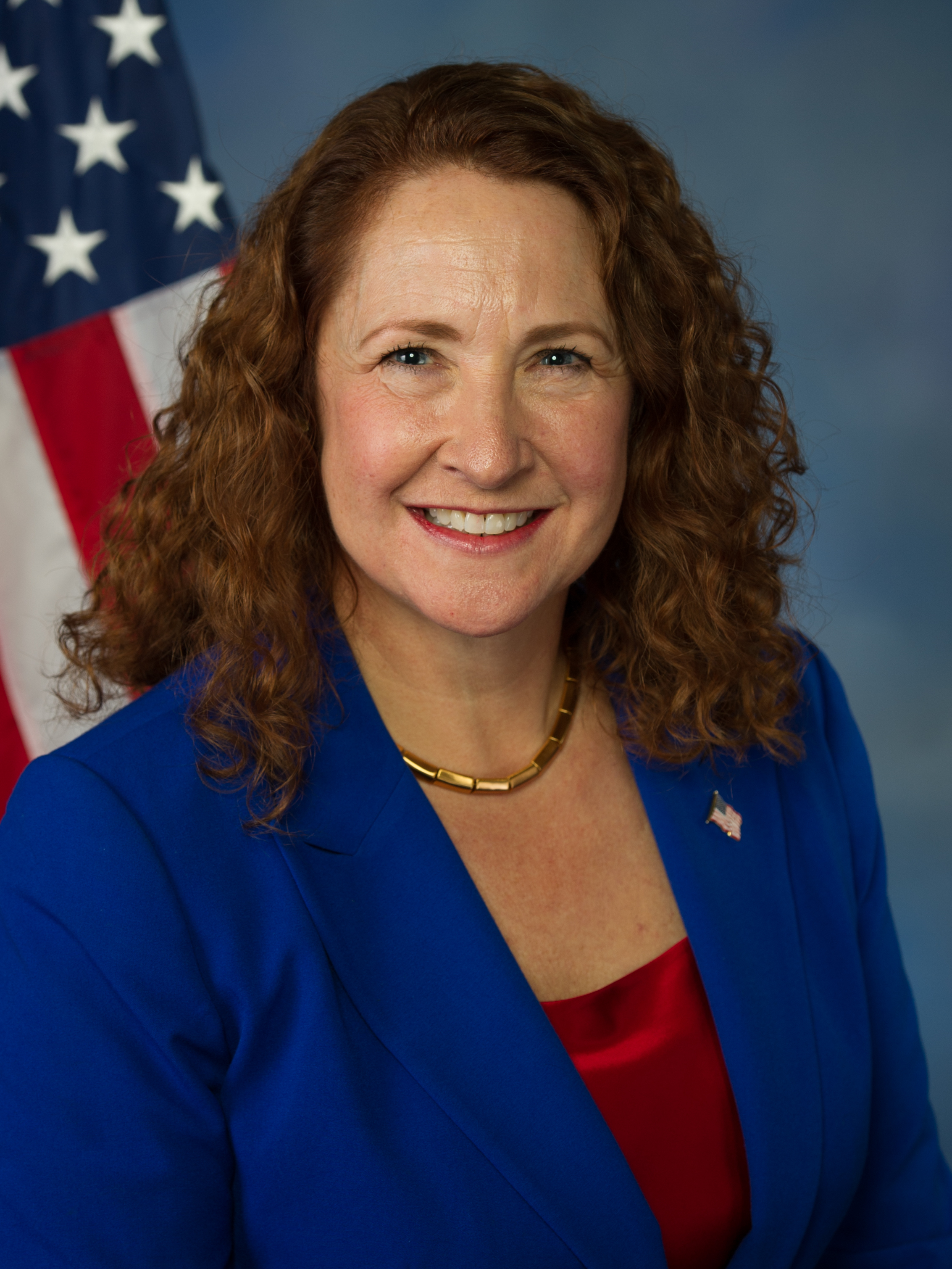

Nominee	Elizabeth Esty	Clay Cope
Party	Democratic	Republican
Alliance	Working Families	Independent Party
Popular vote	179,252	129,801
Percentage	58.0%	42.0%
- Municipality results Esty: 50–60% 60–70% 70–80% Cope: 50–60%
U.S. Representative before election
Elizabeth Esty
Democratic
Elected U.S. Representative
Elizabeth Esty
Democratic

Incumbent Democrat Elizabeth Esty, who had represented the district since 2013, ran for re-election. He was re-elected with 50% of the vote in 2014. The district had a PVI of D+3.

=== Democratic primary ===
==== Candidates ====
===== Nominee =====
- Elizabeth Esty, incumbent U.S. Representative

=== Republican primary ===
==== Candidates ====
===== Nominee =====
- Clay Cope

===== Eliminated in primary =====
- Matt Maxwell
- John Pistone

=== General election ===
==== Predictions ====
Source	Ranking	As of
The Cook Political Report	Safe D	November 7, 2016
Daily Kos Elections	Safe D	November 7, 2016
Rothenberg	Safe D	November 3, 2016
Sabato's Crystal Ball	Safe D	November 7, 2016
RCP	Safe D	October 31, 2016

==== Results ====
Connecticut’s 5th congressional district, 2016
Party	Candidate	Votes	%
Democratic	Elizabeth Esty	163,499	52.9
Working Families	Elizabeth Esty	15,753	5.1
Total	Elizabeth Esty (incumbent)	179,252	58.0
Republican	Clay Cope	124,900	40.4
Independent Party	Clay Cope	4,901	1.6
Total	Clay Cope	129,801	42.0
Independent	John Pistone (write-in)	28	< 0.0
Independent	Ann-Marie Adams (write-in)	1	< 0.0
Total votes		309,082	100.0
Democratic hold			

== See also ==
- United States House of Representatives elections, 2016
- United States elections, 2016
