= Samuel Liskov =

American politician (1908–2001)

- Liskov, c. 1932

Member of Connecticut House of Representatives from 131st District
- In office 1973–1977
- Preceded by: Thomas E. O'Brien
- Succeeded by: John H. Murphy
- Constituency: Bridgeport

Member of Connecticut House of Representatives from 135th District
- In office 1967–1973

Personal details
- Born: Samuel Liskovsky; March 18, 1908 Bridgeport, Connecticut, U.S.
- Died: August 18, 2001 (aged 93) Bridgeport, Connecticut, U.S.
- Party: Democratic
- Spouse: Helen Werner (m. 1937)
- Children: 3
- Education: Junior College, Bridgeport; New York University
- Occupation: Businessman, attorney, politician

Samuel "Sam" Liskov (né Liskovsky; March 18, 1908 – August 18, 2001) was an American politician who served as member of the Connecticut House of Representatives from the 135th, respectively 131st District, for the Democratic Party.

== Early life and education ==
Liskov was born Samuel Liskovsky on March 18, 1908, in Bridgeport, Connecticut, to Russian immigrant parents Nathan, a peddler, and Esther Liskovsky, a homemaker. His native tongue at home was Yiddish. His father deserted during the Russo-Japanese War from the Imperial Russian Army and fled to London with his wife and two sons. They arrived on Ellis Island in 1907 and Samuel was born nine months after.

He attended Shelton School on Wheeler Avenue where he graduated high school in 1922. In 1930, he graduated from a two-year course from Junior College (presently University of Bridgeport). He later completed additional studies at the New York University School of Law.

== Career ==
In 1932, Liskov and his brothers founded Bridgeport Electric and Radio Company, a radio shop located at 746 Madison Avenue in Bridgeport, Connecticut. He was later admitted to the bar and became an attorney.
