= Eisenhower College =

Private college in Seneca Falls, New York (1968–1982)

Eisenhower College was a small college named after U.S. President Dwight Eisenhower, located on Cayuga Lake in Seneca Falls, New York.

== History ==
Ground was broken on September 21, 1965, in a ceremony that featured President Eisenhower and his friend, Bob Hope.

The college's first class entered in September 1968. It was a liberal arts college. Private funds and two federal grants totaling $14.5 million helped establish the college.

A portion of the proceeds from the sale of each Eisenhower Dollar coin went to the college. This amounted to some $9 million between the coin's initial production in 1971 and 1978, when production ceased.

Eisenhower curricula were centered on a core set of courses collectively known as "World Studies". These mandatory courses examined the history of civilization from the ascent of Man through modern times in music, art, history, science, philosophy, and literature. Foreign language and physical education courses were also mandatory.

In March 1979, the liberal arts college, which had a total enrollment of only 460 students and was experiencing financial difficulties, was acquired by Rochester Institute of Technology (RIT).

RIT operated the college for three academic years. Then on July 22, 1982, RIT announced the immediate closing of Eisenhower College due to "major operating deficits". Students and faculty were given the opportunity to transfer to RIT's main campus for the 1982–83 school year. In 1979 when the merger had taken place, RIT had pledged to operate Eisenhower for at least five years. As a result, there were eventually unsuccessful lawsuits by the school's alumni and by the local organizations which had played a key role in the college's founding.

RIT made several efforts to sell the campus, including a proposal to turn it into a state prison. Hundreds of local residents appeared at events opposing the prison plan, and New York State agreed not to go forward with the plan.

RIT eventually deeded the campus to the U.S. Department of Education, which had provided construction loans. In 1989, the property was sold to the New York Chiropractic College which continues to operate on the campus. An archive of Eisenhower College material, donated by former professors and alumni, was stored at the campus library as of 2006.

== See also ==
- List of defunct colleges and universities in New York
