= Seneca Falls Central School District =

School district in Seneca Falls, New York

Location
- Seneca Falls, New York United States

District information
- Motto: Educating the Whole Child
- Grades: K-12
- Superintendent: Michelle Reed
- Schools: 4

Students and staff
- Teachers: 257
- Staff: 127
- Athletic conference: Section V
- District mascot: Blue Devils
- Colors: Blue and White

Other information
- Website: www.senecafallscsd.org

Seneca Falls Central School District is a school district in Seneca Falls, New York, United States. The superintendent is Dr. Michelle Reed.

The district operates four schools: Mynderse Academy, Seneca Falls Middle School, Elizabeth Cady Stanton School, and Frank Knight Elementary.

== Administration ==
The district offices are located 98 Clinton Street in Seneca Falls. The current superintendent is Jeramy Clingerman.

=== Current administrators ===
- Michelle Reed–Superintendent
- James H. Bruni–Administrator of Business and Operations
- Debra Burnham–Director of Transportation
- Anthony J. Ferrara–Director of Athletics
- Joseph Kelly–CSE Chairperson
- Jodie Verkey–Director of Curriculum, Instruction, Assessment, and Professional Development

=== Board of education ===
- Joseph McNamara;President
- Melissa Baxter; Vice President
- Jeffrey Hartwell
- Linda Jones
- Cara Lajewski
- Michael Mirras
- Joell Murney-Karsten
- William Reigel
- Heather Zellers

== Mynderse Academy ==
Mynderse Academy is located at 105 Troy Street and serves grades 9 through 12. The current principal is Faith Lewis, and the current assistant principal is Kevin Korzeniewski.

=== History ===
Mynderse Academy was previously located at 12 North Park Street in Seneca Falls. In 1951–1952, the Seneca Falls School District began construction of the current Troy Street location, which began housing students in 1954. The Park Street building, Known as "Academy Square", the former Mynderse/Junior High building currently houses offices for several businesses and service groups.

== Seneca Falls Middle School ==
Seneca Falls Middle School
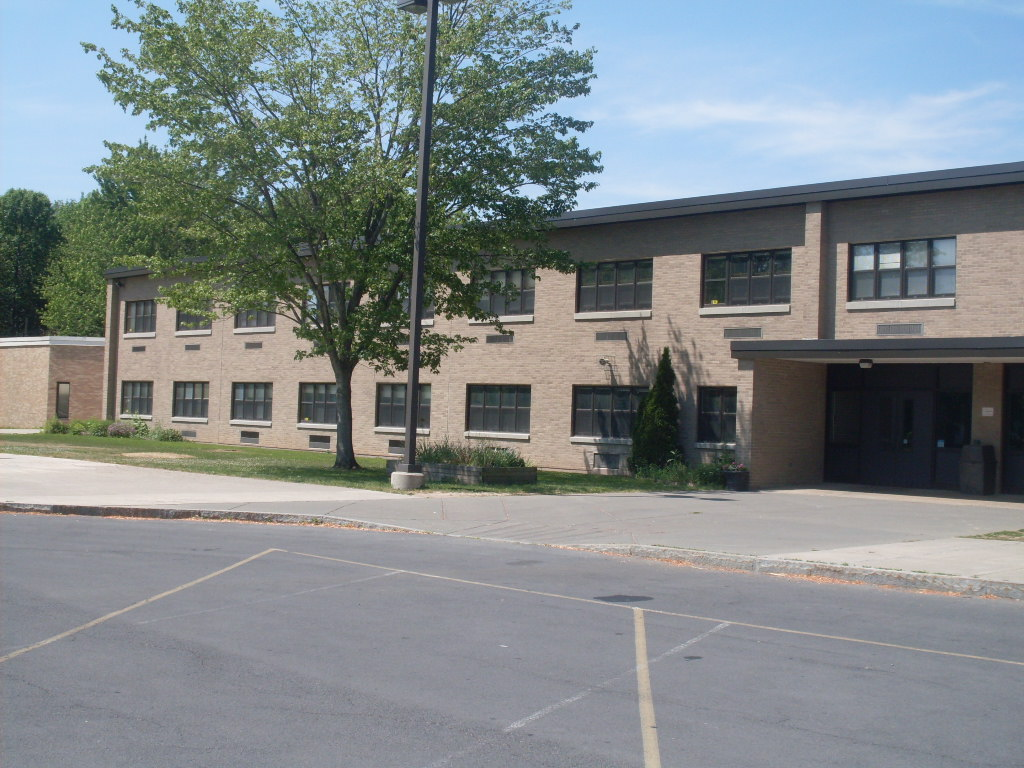

Location
- 95 Troy Street

Information
- Principal: Wallace Kevin Rhinehart
- Grades: 6-8
- Website: sfmiddleschool.senecafallscsd.org

Seneca Falls Middle School is located at 95 Troy Street and serves grades 6 through 8. The current principal is Kevin Rhinehart.

=== History ===
At one point, Seneca Falls Junior High was located in the former Academy Square building. In the 1968 the Middle School was constructed as an extension onto the High School building. For several years it held grades 7-9 and Grades 5 through 8.

== Elizabeth Cady Stanton School ==
Elizabeth Cady Stanton School
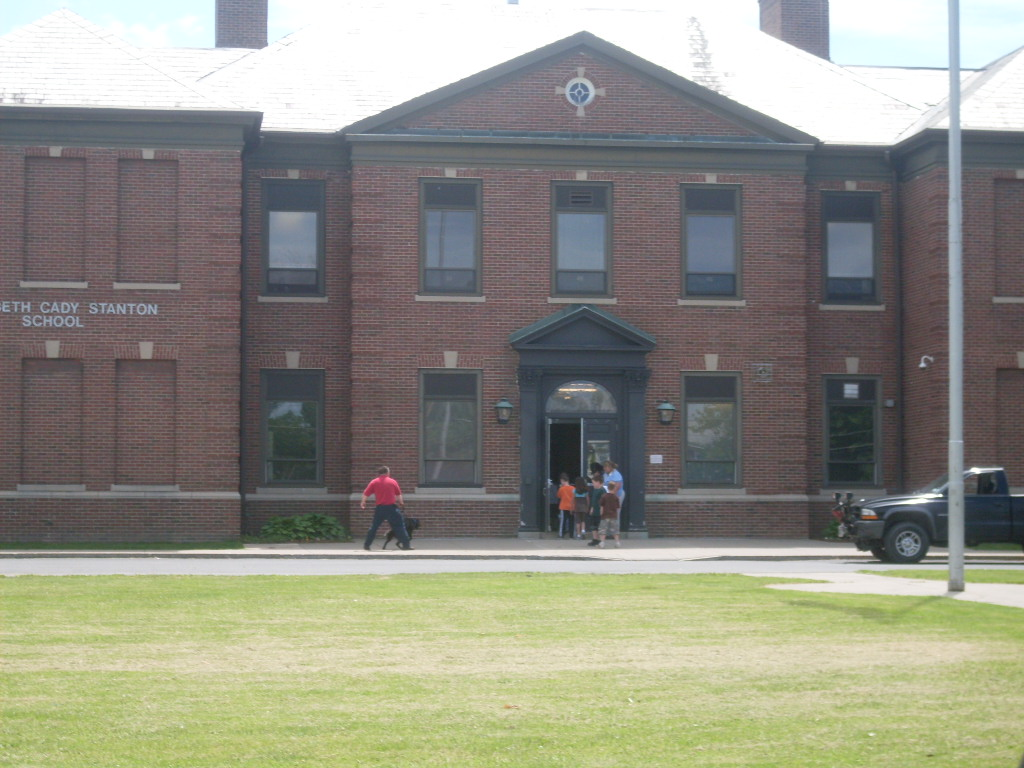

Location
- 38 Garden Street

Information
- Principal: Amy M. Hibbard
- Grades: 3-5
- Website: cadystanton.senecafallscsd.org

Elizabeth Cady Stanton School is located at 38 Garden Street and serves approximately 300 students in grades 3 through 5. The current principal is Amy Hibbard.

=== History ===
ECS is named after suffrage activist Elizabeth Cady Stanton, who lived in Seneca Falls. The school was constructed in 1935, replacing the Third and Fourth Ward schools in the district.

The school previously housed all elementary grades, including Grades K-6. In 1982, the school switched to intermediate grades due to space issues. Since that time, the school has generally housed grades 3–5.

=== Awards ===
In 2010, Elizabeth Cady Stanton School was awarded a National Blue Ribbon Award for an improving or high performance school. It is the highest award given by the United States Department of Education.

== Frank M. Knight Elementary ==
Frank Knight Elementary
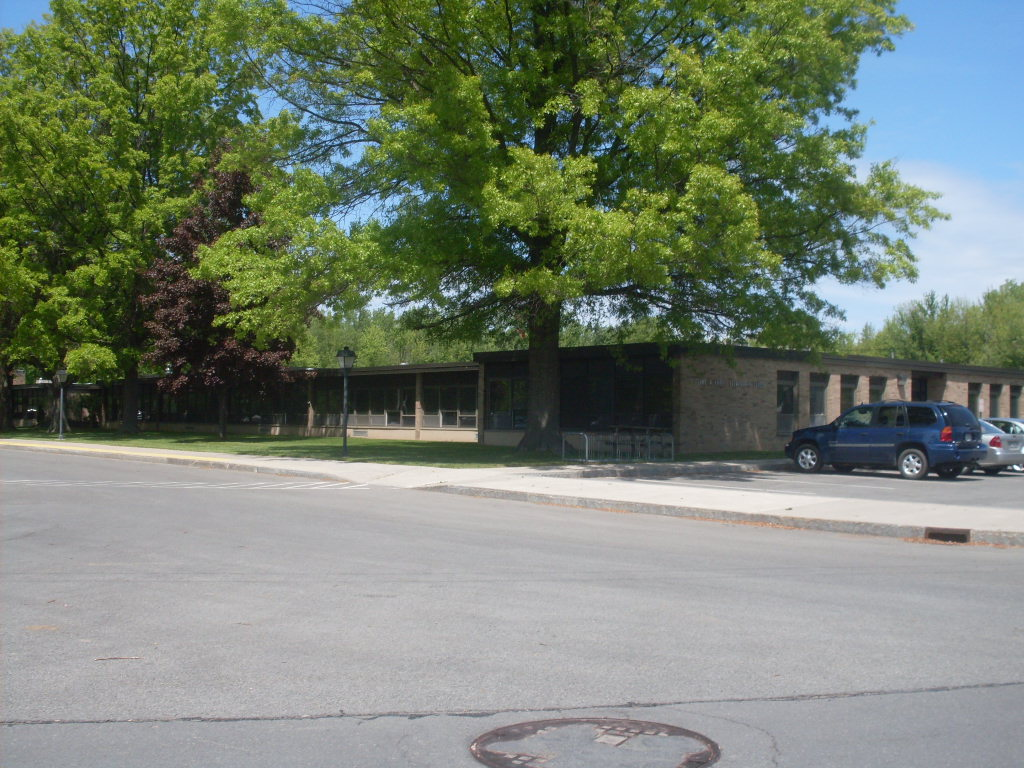

Location
- 98 Clinton Street

Information
- Principal: Janet Clendenen
- Grades: K-2
- Website: frankknight.senecafallscsd.org

Frank M. Knight Elementary is located at 98 Clinton Street and serves grades K through 2. The current principal is Janet Clendenen.

=== History ===
The school was built on Clinton Street in Seneca Falls, and is named for former Board of Education President Frank Knight.

The school previously housed all elementary grades, including Grades K-5. In 1982, the school switched to intermediate grades due to space issues. Since that time, the school has generally housed grades K-2, although Grade 3 has been housed in the school at times.

== Defunct schools ==
Seneca Falls Intermediate School
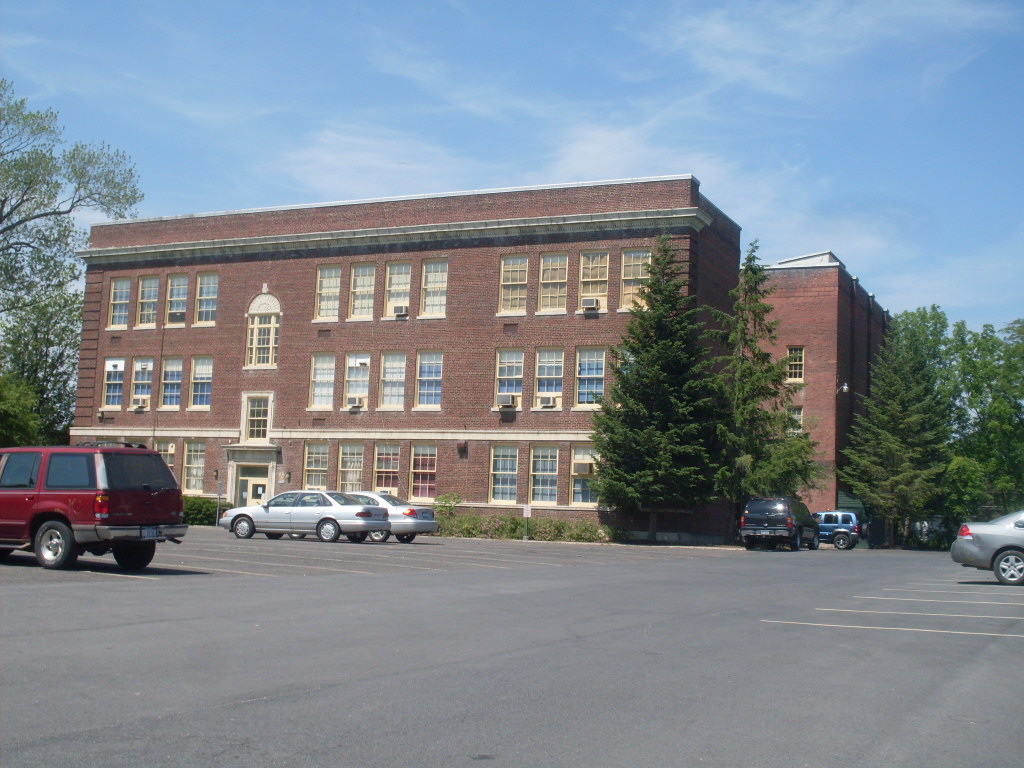
- Former Seneca Falls Intermediate School Building

Location
- 12 North Park Street; Seneca, New York 13148; United States

Information
- Closed: 1982

Seneca Falls Intermediate School was a school that housed grades 4 through 8 in Seneca Falls. It was located at the former Mynderse Academy building on Park Street in Seneca Falls. The school was closed in 1982 as a money-saving initiative by the district.
