= 2012 United States House of Representatives elections in Connecticut =

- November 6, 2012

All 5 Connecticut seats to the United States House of Representatives
	Majority party	Minority party
Party	Democratic	Republican
Last election	5	0
Seats won	5	0
Seat change	Steady	Steady
Popular vote	951,281	500,290
Percentage	64.87%	34.11%
Swing	▲6.18%	▼6.33%

Democratic
40–50%
50–60%
60–70%
70–80%
80–90%
90–100%
Republican
40–50%
50–60%
60–70%
70–80%

The 2012 U.S. House of Representatives elections in Connecticut were held on Tuesday, November 6, 2012, to elect the five congressional representatives from the state, one from each of the state's five congressional districts. The elections coincided with the elections of other federal and state offices, including a quadrennial presidential election, a U.S. Senate election, and state legislature races.

Primaries to select Republican and Democratic candidates in some districts were held on Tuesday, August 14, 2012.

== Overview ==
The table below shows the total number and percentage of votes, as well as the number of seats gained and lost by each political party in the election for the United States House of Representatives in Connecticut.

United States House of Representatives elections in Connecticut, 2012
Party	Votes	Percentage	Seats
Democratic	884,398	60.31%	5
Republican	490,490	33.45%	0
Working Families Party	66,883	4.56%	0
Independent Party of Connecticut	9,710	0.66%	0
Green Party	9,115	0.62%	0
Libertarian	3,511	0.24%	0
Others	2,314	0.16%	0
Total	1,466,511	100%	5

- All five Democratic candidates were cross-endorsed by the Connecticut Working Families Party
- The Republican candidate was cross-endorsed by the Independent Party of Connecticut in the Fifth District

=== By district ===
Results of the 2012 United States House of Representatives elections in Connecticut by district:

District	Democratic		Republican		Others†		Total		Result
District	Votes	%	Votes	%	Votes	%	Votes	%	Result
District 1	206,973*	69.7%	82,321	27.7%	7,767	2.6%	297,061	100.0%	Democratic hold
District 2	204,708*	68.2%	88,103	29.4%	7,149	2.4%	299,960	100.0%	Democratic hold
District 3	217,573*	74.7%	73,726	25.3%	2	<0.0%	291,301	100.0%	Democratic hold
District 4	175,929*	60.0%	117,503	40.0%	N/A	N/A	293,432	100.0%	Democratic hold
District 5	146,098*	51.3%	138,637*	48.7%	22	<0.0%	284,757	100.0%	Democratic hold
Total	951,281*	64.9%	500,290*	34.1%	14,940	1.0%	1,466,511	100.0%	

- * Includes votes for candidates on more than one party line
- † Does not include fusion vote counts -- see individual districts for details

== District 1 ==
2012 Connecticut's 1st congressional district election
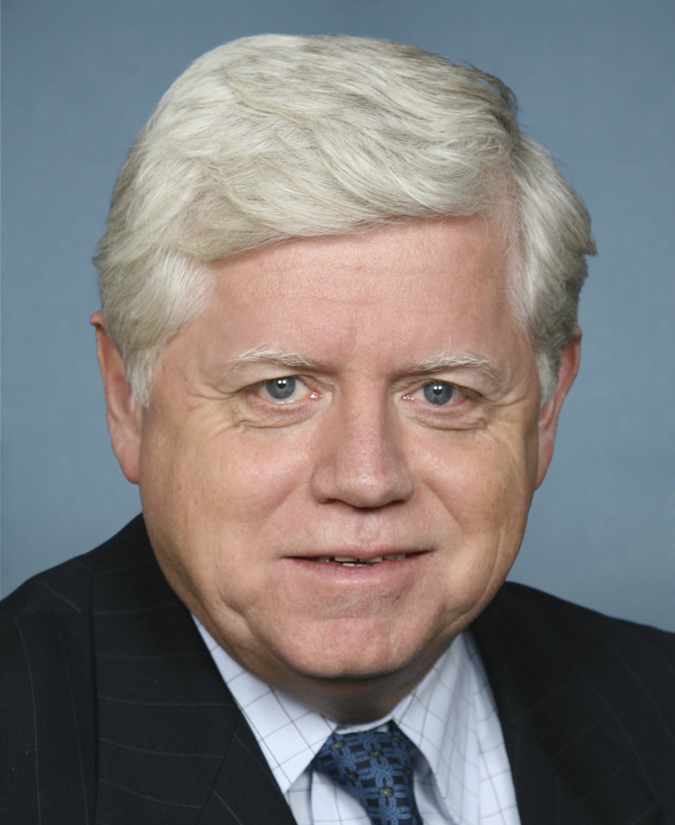

Nominee	John B. Larson	John Henry Decker
Party	Democratic	Republican
Alliance	Working Families
Popular vote	206,973	82,321
Percentage	69.7%	27.7%
- Municipality results Larson: 50–60% 60–70% 70–80% 80–90% >90% Decker: 40–50% 50–60%
U.S. Representative before election
John B. Larson
Democratic
Elected U.S. Representative
John B. Larson
Democratic

Democratic incumbent John Larson, who had represented the 1st district since 1999, sought re-election.

=== Democratic primary ===
==== Candidates ====
===== Nominee =====
- John Larson, incumbent U.S. Representative

=== Republican primary ===
==== Candidates ====
===== Nominee =====
- John Decker, financial planner

===== Eliminated in primary =====
- Mike McDonald, member of the Windsor Town Council,

==== Results ====
Decker won the nomination at the Republican state convention on May 18, garnering 69% of available delegates.

=== General election ===
Matthew M. Corey gained ballot access as a named candidate by petition.

==== Predictions ====
Source	Ranking	As of
The Cook Political Report	Safe D	November 5, 2012
Rothenberg	Safe D	November 2, 2012
Roll Call	Safe D	November 4, 2012
Sabato's Crystal Ball	Safe D	November 5, 2012
NY Times	Safe D	November 4, 2012
RCP	Safe D	November 4, 2012
The Hill	Safe D	November 4, 2012

==== Results ====
Connecticut's 1st congressional district, 2012
Party	Candidate	Votes	%
Democratic	John B. Larson	192,840	64.9
Working Families	John B. Larson	14,133	4.8
Total	John B. Larson (incumbent)	206,973	69.7
Republican	John Henry Decker	82,321	27.7
Green	S. Michael DeRosa	5,477	1.8
Petitioning Candidate	Matthew M. Corey	2,290	0.8
Total votes		297,061	100.0
Democratic hold			

== District 2 ==
2012 Connecticut's 2nd congressional district election

Nominee	Joe Courtney	Paul Formica
Party	Democratic	Republican
Alliance	Working Families
Popular vote	204,708	88,103
Percentage	68.3%	29.4%
- Municipality results Courtney: 50–60% 60–70% 70–80% 80–90%
U.S. Representative before election
Joe Courtney
Democratic
Elected U.S. Representative
Joe Courtney
Democratic

Democratic incumbent Joe Courtney, who had represented the 2nd district since 2007, said in February 2011 that he would not run for the U.S. Senate seat to be vacated by Joe Lieberman. Courtney ran for re-election.

=== Democratic primary ===
==== Candidates ====
===== Nominee =====
- Joe Courtney, incumbent U.S. Representative

=== Republican primary ===
==== Candidates ====
===== Nominee =====
- Paul Formica, first selectman of the East Lyme Board of Selectmen

===== Eliminated in primary =====
- Doug Dubitsky, lawyer and candidate for this seat in 2010
- Daria Novak, business consultant and former State Department employee and candidate for this seat in 2010

===== Withdrawn =====
- Christopher Coutu, state representative

==== Primary results ====
At the Republican state convention on May 18, delegates in the second district endorsed Formica. Formica and Novak took part in the August 14 primary, which Formica won.

Republican primary results
Party	Candidate	Votes	%
Republican	Paul M. Formica	14,256	66.9
Republican	Daria Novak	7,050	33.1
Total votes		21,306	100.0

=== General election ===
==== Predictions ====
Source	Ranking	As of
The Cook Political Report	Safe D	November 5, 2012
Rothenberg	Safe D	November 2, 2012
Roll Call	Safe D	November 4, 2012
Sabato's Crystal Ball	Safe D	November 5, 2012
NY Times	Safe D	November 4, 2012
RCP	Safe D	November 4, 2012
The Hill	Safe D	November 4, 2012

==== Results ====
Connecticut's 2nd congressional district, 2012
Party	Candidate	Votes	%
Democratic	Joe Courtney	189,444	63.16
Working Families	Joe Courtney	15,264	5.09
Total	Joe Courtney (incumbent)	204,708	68.25
Republican	Paul Formica	88,103	29.37
Green	Colin D. Bennett	3,638	1.21
Libertarian	Daniel J. Reale	3,511	1.17
Total votes		299,960	100.00
Democratic hold			

== District 3 ==
2014 Connecticut's 3rd congressional district election
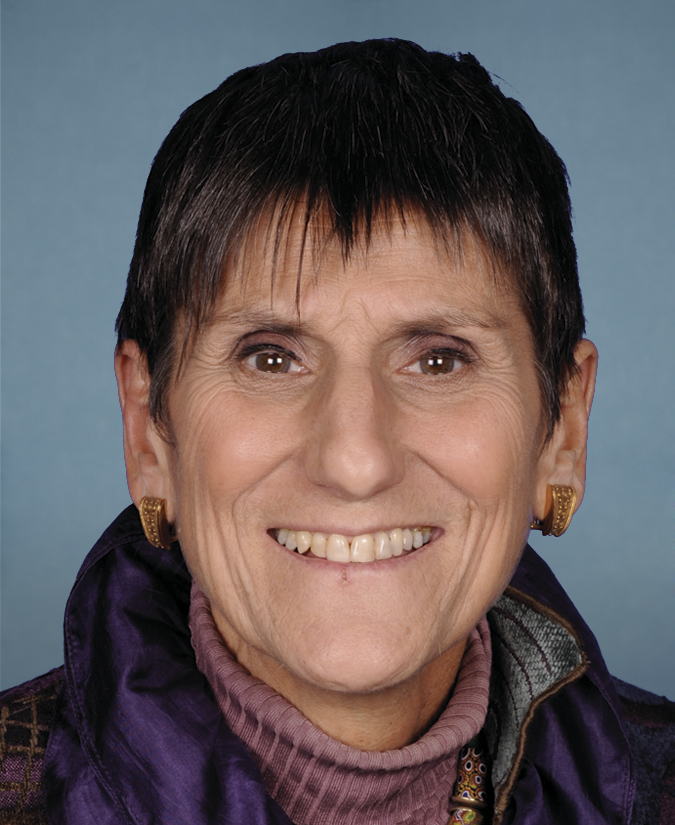

Nominee	Rosa DeLauro	Wayne Winsley
Party	Democratic	Republican
Alliance	Working Families
Popular vote	217,573	73,726
Percentage	74.7%	25.3%
- Municipality results DeLauro: 50–60% 60–70% 70–80% 80-90% >90%
U.S. Representative before election
Rosa DeLauro
Democratic
Elected U.S. Representative
Rosa DeLauro
Democratic

Democratic incumbent Rosa DeLauro, who had represented the 3rd district since 1991, ran for re-election.

=== Democratic primary ===
==== Candidates ====
===== Nominee =====
- Rosa DeLauro, incumbent U.S. Representative

=== Republican primary ===
==== Candidates ====
===== Nominee =====
- Wayne Winsley, Motivational speaker

===== Eliminated in primary =====
- Steve Packard

==== Results ====
At the Republican state convention on May 18, delegates in the third district endorsed Winsley. Following the Republican state convention, Steve Packard announced his intention to run for the office as an independent.

=== General election ===
==== Predictions ====
Source	Ranking	As of
The Cook Political Report	Safe D	November 5, 2012
Rothenberg	Safe D	November 2, 2012
Roll Call	Safe D	November 4, 2012
Sabato's Crystal Ball	Safe D	November 5, 2012
NY Times	Safe D	November 4, 2012
RCP	Safe D	November 4, 2012
The Hill	Safe D	November 4, 2012

==== Results ====
Connecticut's 3rd congressional district, 2012
Party	Candidate	Votes	%
Democratic	Rosa DeLauro	197,163	67.7
Working Families	Rosa DeLauro	20,410	7.0
Total	Rosa DeLauro (incumbent)	217,573	74.7
Republican	Wayne Winsley	73,726	25.3
Independent	Hector W. Concepcion (write-in)	1	< 0.0
Independent	Stephen "Steve" Packard (write-in)	1	< 0.0
Total votes		291,301	100.0
Democratic hold			

== District 4 ==
2012 Connecticut's 4th congressional district election

Nominee	Jim Himes	Steve Obsitnik
Party	Democratic	Republican
Alliance	Working Families	Independent Party
Popular vote	175,929	117,503
Percentage	60%	40%
- Municipality results Himes: 50–60% 60–70% 80–90% Obsitnik: 50–60% 60–70%
U.S. Representative before election
Jim Himes
Democratic
Elected U.S. Representative
Jim Himes
Democratic

Democratic incumbent Jim Himes, who had represented the 4th district since 2009, said in December 2010 that he would not run for the U.S. Senate in 2012. Himes ran for re-election.

=== Democratic primary ===
==== Candidates ====
===== Nominee =====
- Jim Himes, incumbent U.S. Representative

=== Republican primary ===
==== Candidates ====
===== Nominee =====
- Steve Obsitnik, chair and chief executive of Quintel Technology

===== Eliminated in primary =====
- Chris Meek, the founder of START Now!, a non-profit organization
- David Orner, executive with CIT Group
- Richard Wieland, retired businessman

===== Declined =====
- Dan Debicella, former state senator and nominee for this seat in 2010

==== Results ====
At the Republican state convention on May 18, delegates in the fourth district endorsed Obsitnik. Meek met the threshold required to force a primary, but decided not to challenge the endorsed candidate. Obsitnik lost to Himes.

=== General election ===
==== Endorsements ====
Steve Obsitnik (R)

Organizations

- National Republican Congressional Committee "Young Guns" Program

==== Predictions ====
Source	Ranking	As of
The Cook Political Report	Safe D	November 5, 2012
Rothenberg	Safe D	November 2, 2012
Roll Call	Safe D	November 4, 2012
Sabato's Crystal Ball	Safe D	November 5, 2012
NY Times	Safe D	November 4, 2012
RCP	Likely D	November 4, 2012
The Hill	Safe D	November 4, 2012

==== Results ====
Connecticut's 4th congressional district, 2012
Party	Candidate	Votes	%
Democratic	Jim Himes	167,320	57
Working Families	Jim Himes	8,609	3
Total	Jim Himes (incumbent)	175,929	60
Republican	Steve Obsitnik	117,503	40
Total votes		293,432	100
Democratic hold			

== District 5 ==
2012 Connecticut's 5th congressional district election
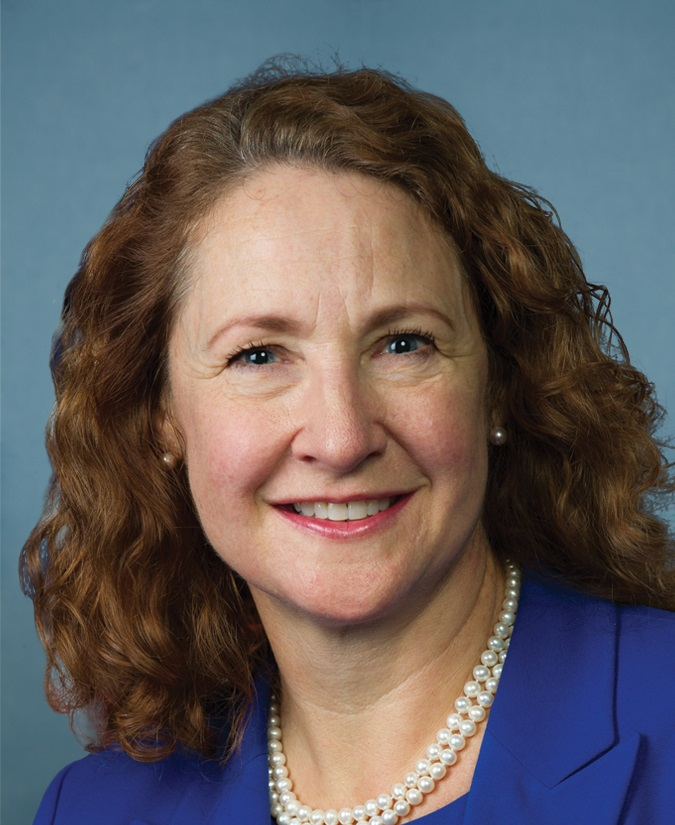

Nominee	Elizabeth Esty	Andrew Roraback
Party	Democratic	Republican
Popular vote	146,098	138,637
Percentage	51.3%	48.7%
- Municipality results Esty: 50–60% 60–70% 70–80% Roraback: 50–60% 60–70% 70–80%
U.S. Representative before election
Chris Murphy
Democratic
Elected U.S. Representative
Elizabeth Esty
Democratic

Incumbent Democrat Chris Murphy had represented the 5th district since 2007. He announced that he would not seek re-election for a fourth term. He instead ran for the U.S. Senate to replace Independent Democrat Joe Lieberman, who retired from the Senate. Murphy won election to the Senate.

=== Democratic primary ===
Prior to the Democratic primary, Donovan received the endorsement of the Connecticut Working Families Party and was granted placement on its ballot line for the general election. On August 30, Donovan withdrew his name from the Working Families line to allow the minor party to endorse Elizabeth Esty, the primary winner.

==== Candidates ====
===== Nominee =====
- Elizabeth Esty, former state representative

===== Eliminated in primary =====
- Chris Donovan, speaker of the Connecticut House of Representatives
- Daniel Roberti, public relations firm worker

===== Disqualified =====
- Randy Yale, insurance underwriter

===== Withdrawn =====
- Mike Williams, advisor to Barack Obama's 2008 presidential campaign

==== Primary results ====
Democratic primary results
Party	Candidate	Votes	%
Democratic	Elizabeth Etsy	12,717	44.6
Democratic	Chris Donovan	9,216	32.3
Democratic	Dan Roberti	6,582	23.1
Total votes		28,515	100.0

=== Republican primary ===
At the Republican state convention on May 18, delegates in the fifth district endorsed Roraback. Roraback, Wilson-Foley, Bernier, and Greenberg took part in the August 14 primary.

==== Candidates ====
===== Nominee =====
- Andrew Roraback, state senator

===== Eliminated in primary =====
- Justin Bernier, former member of Governor Jodi Rell's cabinet
- Mark Greenberg, businessman
- Lisa Wilson-Foley, businesswoman and candidate for lieutenant governor in 2010

===== Withdrawn =====
- Mike Clark, chair of the Farmington Town Council and a former FBI agent

===== Declined =====
- Sam Caligiuri, former state senator and nominee for this seat in 2010

==== Endorsements ====
Lisa Wilson-Foley

Organizations

- Maggie's List

==== Primary results ====
Republican primary results
Party	Candidate	Votes	%
Republican	Andrew Roraback	9,536	32.1
Republican	Mark Greenberg	8,033	27.0
Republican	Justin Bernier	6,167	20.8
Republican	Lisa Wilson-Foley	5,966	20.1
Total votes		29,702	100.0

=== General election ===
==== Endorsements ====
Elizabeth Esty (D)

Organizations

- Democratic Congressional Campaign Committee "Red to Blue" Program
- EMILY's List
Andrew Roraback (R)

Organizations

- National Republican Congressional Committee "Young Guns" Program

==== Predictions ====
Source	Ranking	As of
The Cook Political Report	Tossup	November 5, 2012
Rothenberg	Tossup	November 2, 2012
Roll Call	Lean D	November 4, 2012
Sabato's Crystal Ball	Lean D	November 5, 2012
NY Times	Tossup	November 4, 2012
RCP	Tossup	November 4, 2012
The Hill	Lean D	November 4, 2012

==== Results ====
Connecticut's 5th congressional district, 2012
Party	Candidate	Votes	%
Democratic	Elizabeth Esty	137,631	48.3
Working Families	Elizabeth Esty	8,467	3.0
Total	Elizabeth Esty	146,098	51.3
Republican	Andrew Roraback	128,927	45.3
Independent Party	Andrew Roraback	9,710	3.4
Total	Andrew Roraback	138,637	48.7
Independent	John Pistone (write-in)	12	< 0.0
Independent	Russ Jaeger (write-in)	10	< 0.0
Total votes		284,757	100.0
Democratic hold			

== See also ==
- 2012 United States House of Representatives elections
- 2012 United States elections

Preceded by 2010 elections	United States House elections in Connecticut; 2012	Succeeded by 2014 elections
