= 2014 United States House of Representatives elections in Connecticut =

- November 4, 2014

All 5 Connecticut seats to the United States House of Representatives
	Majority party	Minority party
Party	Democratic	Republican
Last election	5	0
Seats won	5	0
Seat change	Steady	Steady
Popular vote	596,390	409,513
Percentage	55.85%	38.35%
Swing	▼9.02%	▲4.90%

Democratic
40–50%
50–60%
60–70%
70–80%
80–90%
90–100%
Republican
40–50%
50–60%
60–70%

The 2014 United States House of Representatives elections in Connecticut were held on Tuesday, November 4, 2014, to elect the five U.S. representatives from the state of Connecticut, one from each of the state's five congressional districts. The elections coincided with the elections of other federal and state offices, including Governor of Connecticut.

Democrats swept all five districts in 2014, bringing their winning streak in Connecticut U.S. House elections to 20 in a row – the second longest partisan winning streak in state history and the longest for the Democratic Party.

== Overview ==
The table below shows the total number and percentage of votes, as well as the number of seats won by each political party in the election for the United States House of Representatives in Connecticut.

United States House of Representatives elections in Connecticut, 2014
Party	Votes	Percentage	Seats
Democratic	596,390	55.849%	5
Republican	409,513	38.349%	0
Working Families Party	42,305	3.962%	0
Independent Party of Connecticut	9,076	0.850%	0
Green Party	5,996	0.561%	0
Libertarian	2,602	0.244%	0
Others	1,975	0.185%	0
Total	1,067,857	100%	5

- All five Democratic candidates were cross-endorsed by the Connecticut Working Families Party
- The Republican candidates were cross-endorsed by the Independent Party of Connecticut in the Fourth and Fifth Districts

=== By district ===
Results of the 2014 United States House of Representatives elections in Connecticut by district:

District	Democratic		Republican		Others†		Total		Result
District	Votes	%	Votes	%	Votes	%	Votes	%	Result
District 1	135,825*	62.34%	78,609	36.08%	3,447	1.58%	217,881	100.00%	Democratic hold
District 2	141,948*	62.28%	80,837	35.46%	5,151	2.28%	227,936	100.00%	Democratic hold
District 3	140,485*	66.92%	69,454	33.08%	N/A	N/A	209,939	100.00%	Democratic hold
District 4	106, 873*	53.76%	91,922*	46.24%	5	<0.00%	198,800	100.00%	Democratic hold
District 5	113,564*	53.24%	97,767*	45.84%	1,970	0.92%	213,301	100.00%	Democratic hold
Total	638,695*	59.81%	418,589*	39.20%	10,573	0.99%	1,067,857	100.0%	

- * Includes votes for candidates on more than one party line
- † Does not include fusion vote counts -- see individual districts for details

== District 1 ==
2014 Connecticut's 1st congressional district election
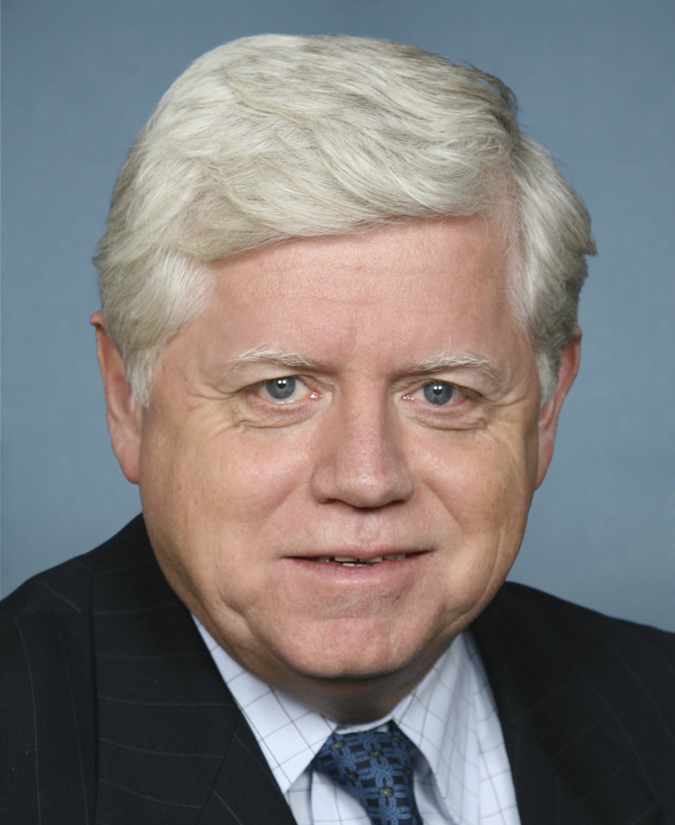

Nominee	John B. Larson	Matthew Corey
Party	Democratic	Republican
Alliance	Working Families
Popular vote	135,825	78,609
Percentage	62.3%	36.1%
- Municipality results Larson: 50–60% 60–70% 70–80% 80–90% >90% Corey: 40–50% 50–60% 60–70%
U.S. Representative before election
John B. Larson
Democratic
Elected U.S. Representative
John B. Larson
Democratic

Incumbent Democrat John B. Larson, who had represented this district since 1999, ran for re-election.

=== Democratic primary ===
==== Candidates ====
===== Nominee =====
- John B. Larson, incumbent U.S. Representative

=== Republican primary ===
==== Candidates ====
===== Nominee =====
- Matthew Corey, business owner and Independent candidate for this seat in 2012

=== General election ===
==== Predictions ====
Source	Ranking	As of
The Cook Political Report	Safe D	November 3, 2014
Rothenberg	Safe D	October 24, 2014
Sabato's Crystal Ball	Safe D	October 30, 2014
RCP	Safe D	November 2, 2014
Daily Kos Elections	Safe D	November 4, 2014

==== Results ====
Connecticut's 1st congressional district, 2014
Party	Candidate	Votes	%
Democratic	John B. Larson	127,430	58.49
Working Families	John B. Larson	8,395	3.85
Total	John B. Larson (incumbent)	135,825	62.34
Republican	Matthew Corey	78,609	36.08
Green	Jeffery Russell	3,447	1.58
Total votes		217,881	100.00
Democratic hold			

== District 2 ==
2014 Connecticut's 2nd congressional district election
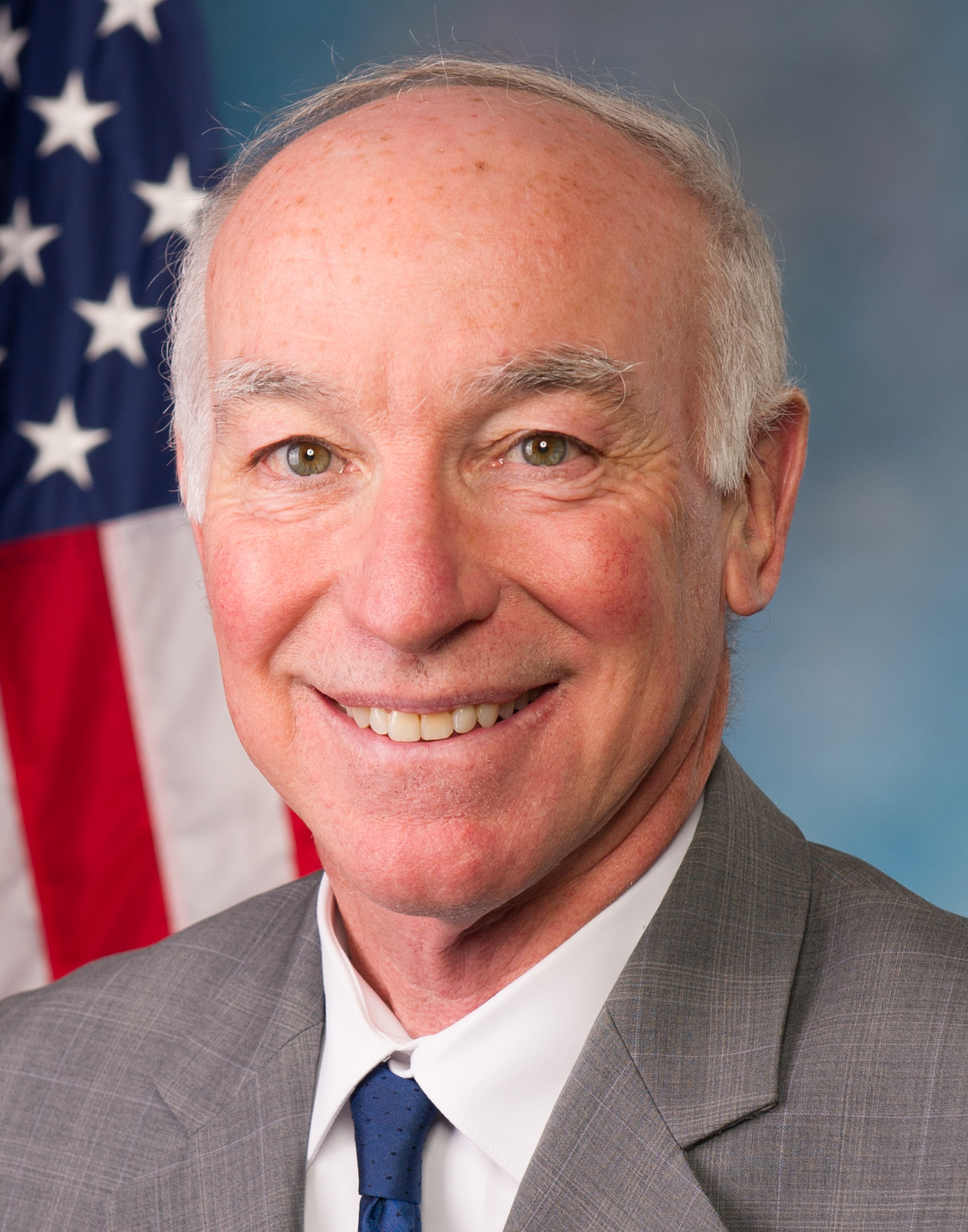

Nominee	Joe Courtney	Lori Hopkins-Cavanagh
Party	Democratic	Republican
Alliance	Working Families
Popular vote	141,948	80,837
Percentage	62.3%	35.5%
- Municipality results Courtney: 50–60% 60–70% 70–80%
U.S. Representative before election
Joe Courtney
Democratic
Elected U.S. Representative
Joe Courtney
Democratic

Incumbent Democrat Joe Courtney, who has represented this district since 2007, ran for re-election.

=== Democratic primary ===
==== Candidates ====
===== Nominee =====
- Joe Courtney, incumbent U.S. Representative

=== Republican primary ===
==== Candidates ====
===== Nominee =====
- Lori Hopkins-Cavanagh, radio show producer and host

===== Eliminated in primary =====
- Evan Evans

=== Libertarian primary ===
==== Candidates ====
===== Nominee =====
- Dan Reale, nominee for this seat in 2012

=== Green primary ===
==== Candidates ====
===== Nominee =====
- William Clyde, economics and finance professor

=== General election ===
==== Predictions ====
Source	Ranking	As of
The Cook Political Report	Safe D	November 3, 2014
Rothenberg	Safe D	October 24, 2014
Sabato's Crystal Ball	Safe D	October 30, 2014
RCP	Safe D	November 2, 2014
Daily Kos Elections	Safe D	November 4, 2014

==== Results ====
Connecticut's 2nd congressional district, 2014
Party	Candidate	Votes	%
Democratic	Joe Courtney	131,294	57.6
Working Families	Joe Courtney	10,654	4.7
Total	Joe Courtney (incumbent)	141,948	62.3
Republican	Lori Hopkins-Cavanagh	80,837	35.5
Libertarian	Daniel Reale	2,602	1.1
Green	William Clyde	2,549	1.1
Total votes		227,936	100.0
Democratic hold			

== District 3 ==
2014 Connecticut's 3rd congressional district election
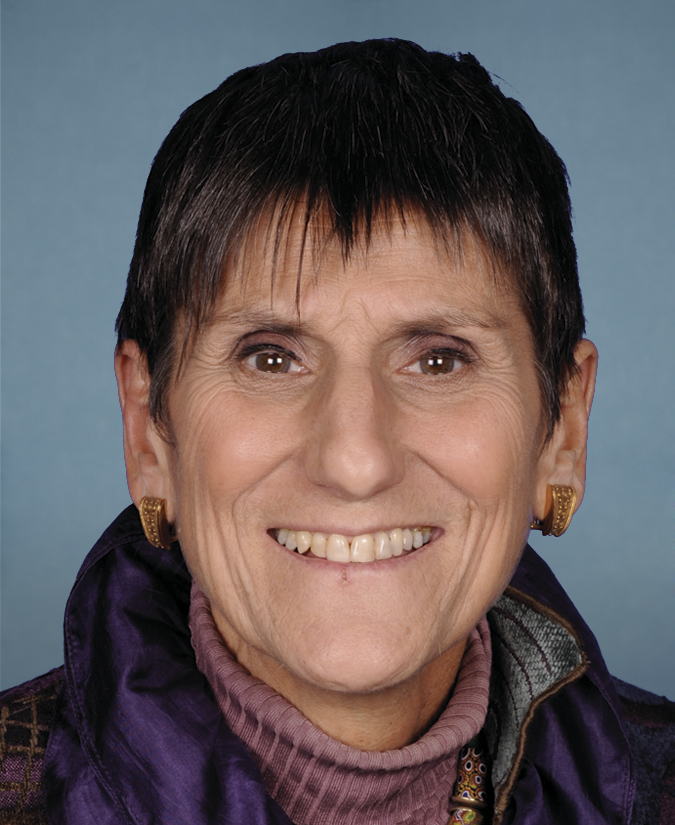

Nominee	Rosa DeLauro	James Brown
Party	Democratic	Republican
Alliance	Working Families
Popular vote	140,485	69,454
Percentage	66.9%	33.1%
- Municipality results DeLauro: 50–60% 60–70% 70–80% >90% Brown: 50–60%
U.S. Representative before election
Rosa DeLauro
Democratic
Elected U.S. Representative
Rosa DeLauro
Democratic

Incumbent Democrat Rosa DeLauro, who has represented this district since 1991, ran for re-election.

=== Democratic primary ===
==== Candidates ====
===== Nominee =====
- Rosa DeLauro, incumbent U.S. Representative

=== Republican primary ===
==== Candidates ====
===== Nominee =====
- James Brown, former maths teacher

===== Eliminated in primary =====
- Steve Packard

=== General election ===
==== Predictions ====
Source	Ranking	As of
The Cook Political Report	Safe D	November 3, 2014
Rothenberg	Safe D	October 24, 2014
Sabato's Crystal Ball	Safe D	October 30, 2014
RCP	Safe D	November 2, 2014
Daily Kos Elections	Safe D	November 4, 2014

==== Results ====
Connecticut's 3rd congressional district, 2014
Party	Candidate	Votes	%
Democratic	Rosa DeLauro	130,009	61.9
Working Families	Rosa DeLauro	10,476	5.0
Total	Rosa DeLauro (incumbent)	140,485	66.9
Republican	James E. Brown	69,454	33.1
Total votes		209,939	100.0
Democratic hold			

== District 4 ==
2014 Connecticut's 4th congressional district election
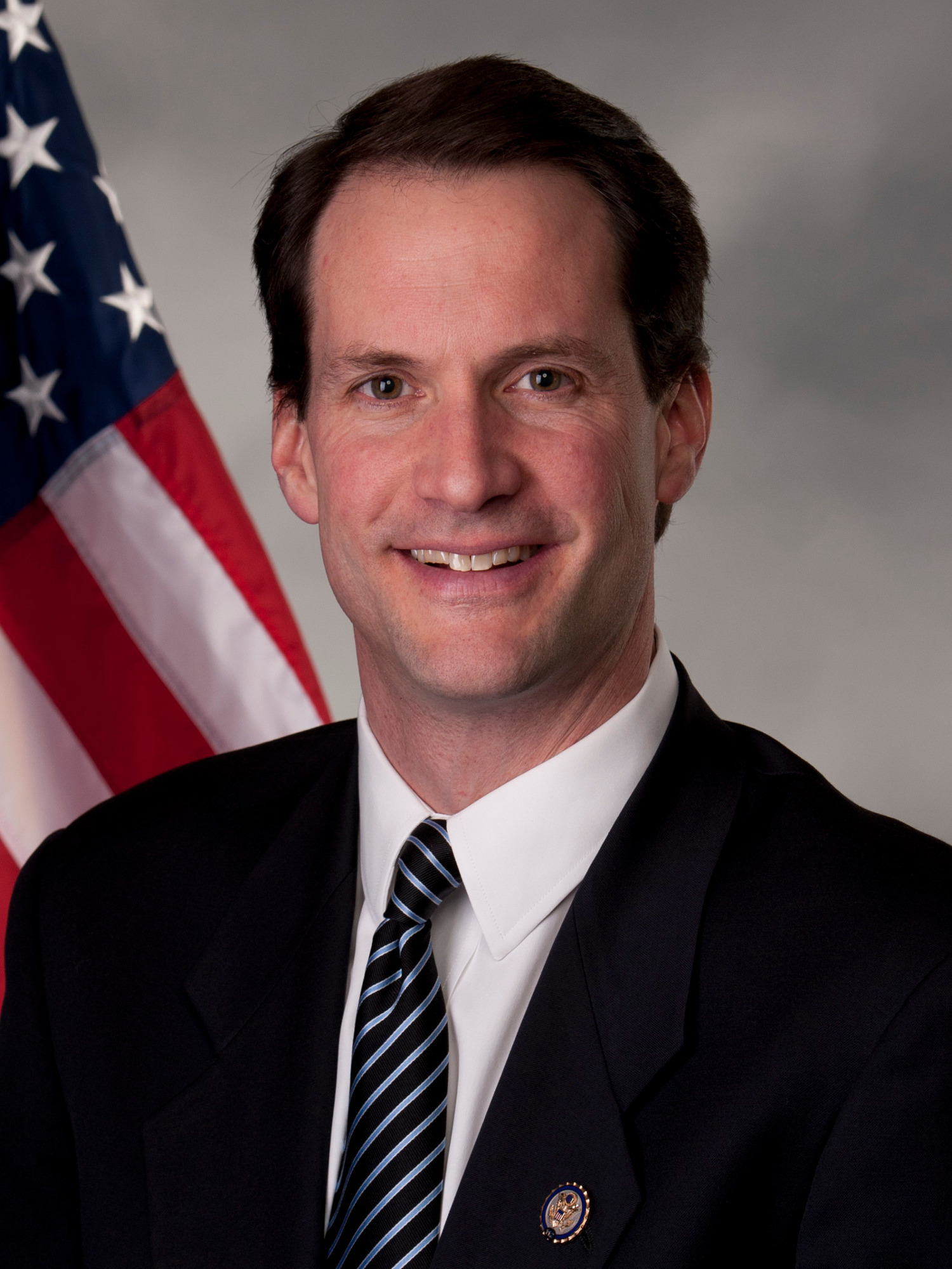

Nominee	Jim Himes	Dan Debicella
Party	Democratic	Republican
Alliance	Working Families	Independent Party
Popular vote	106,873	91,922
Percentage	53.8%	46.2%
- Municipality results Himes: 50–60% 60–70% 80–90% Debicella: 50–60% 60–70%
U.S. Representative before election
Jim Himes
Democratic
Elected U.S. Representative
Jim Himes
Democratic

Incumbent Democrat Jim Himes, who has represented this district since 2009, ran for re-election.

=== Democratic primary ===
==== Candidates ====
===== Nominee =====
- Jim Himes, incumbent U.S. Representative

=== Republican primary ===
==== Candidates ====
===== Nominee =====
- Dan Debicella, former State Senator and nominee for this seat in 2010

===== Eliminated in primary =====
- Joe Bentivegna
- Carl Higbie, former Navy SEAL

===== Withdrawn =====
- John Shaban, state representative

===== Declined =====
- Linda McMahon, businesswoman and nominee for Senate in 2010 and 2012

=== General election ===
==== Endorsements ====
Dan Debicella (R)

Organizations

- National Republican Congressional Committee "Young Guns" Program

==== Predictions ====
Source	Ranking	As of
The Cook Political Report	Safe D	November 3, 2014
Rothenberg	Safe D	October 24, 2014
Sabato's Crystal Ball	Safe D	October 30, 2014
RCP	Safe D	November 2, 2014
Daily Kos Elections	Safe D	November 4, 2014

==== Results ====
Connecticut's 4th congressional district, 2014
Party	Candidate	Votes	%
Democratic	Jim Himes	101,401	51.01
Working Families	Jim Himes	5,472	2.75
Total	Jim Himes (incumbent)	106,873	53.76
Republican	Dan Debicella	88,209	44.37
Independent Party	Dan Debicella	3,713	1.87
Total	Dan Debicella	91,922	46.24
Independent	Stephen Miller (write-in)	3	<0.00
Independent	Sophie Pastore (write-in)	2	<0.00
Total votes		198,800	100.0
Democratic hold			

== District 5 ==
2014 Connecticut's 5th congressional district election
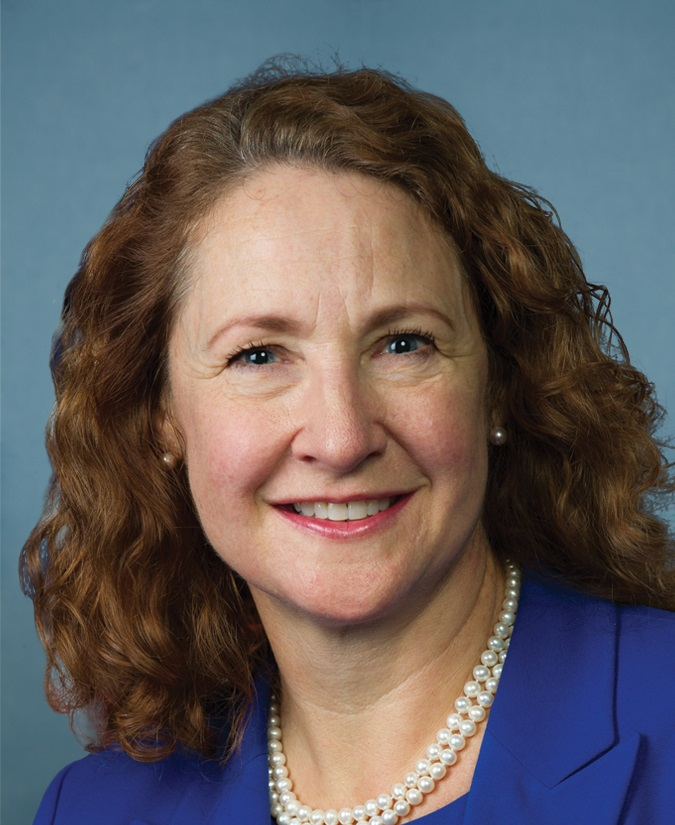

Nominee	Elizabeth Esty	Mark Greenberg
Party	Democratic	Republican
Popular vote	113,564	97,767
Percentage	53.2%	45.9%
- Municipality results Esty: 40–50% 50–60% 60–70% 70–80% Greenberg: 50–60%
U.S. Representative before election
Elizabeth Esty
Democratic
Elected U.S. Representative
Elizabeth Esty
Democratic

Incumbent Democrat Elizabeth Esty, who has represented this district since 2013, ran for re-election.

=== Democratic primary ===
==== Candidates ====
===== Nominee =====
- Elizabeth Esty, incumbent U.S. Representative

=== Republican primary ===
==== Candidates ====
===== Nominee =====
- Mark Greenberg, businessman and candidate for this seat in 2010 & 2012

===== Eliminated in primary =====
- Sal Lilienthal

===== Declined =====
- Andrew Roraback, state senator and nominee for this seat in 2012 (accepted a judgeship)

=== General election ===
John J. Pistone gained ballot access as a named candidate by petition.

==== Endorsements ====
Elizabeth Esty (D)

Organizations

- Democratic Congressional Campaign Committee "Frontline" Program
Mark Greenberg (R)

Organizations

- National Republican Congressional Committee "Young Guns" Program

==== Polling ====
Poll source	Date(s) administered	Sample size	Margin of error	Elizabeth Esty (D)	Mark Greenberg (R)	Undecided
New York Times/CBS News Battleground Tracker	October 16–23, 2014	427	± 6.0%	50%	41%	9%
Garin-Hart-Yang (D-Esty)	October 8–10, 2014	400	± 5.0%	52%	36%	12%

==== Predictions ====
Source	Ranking	As of
The Cook Political Report	Likely D	November 3, 2014
Rothenberg	Safe D	October 24, 2014
Sabato's Crystal Ball	Likely D	October 30, 2014
RCP	Likely D	November 2, 2014
Daily Kos Elections	Likely D	November 4, 2014

==== Results ====
Connecticut's 5th congressional district, 2014
Party	Candidate	Votes	%
Democratic	Elizabeth Esty	106,256	50
Working Families	Elizabeth Esty	7,308	3
Total	Elizabeth Esty (incumbent)	113,564	53
Republican	Mark Greenberg	92,404	43
Independent Party	Mark Greenberg	5,363	3
Total	Mark Greenberg	97,767	46
Petitioning Candidate	John J. Pistone	1,970	1
Total votes		213,301	100
Democratic hold			

== See also ==
- 2014 United States House of Representatives elections
- 2014 United States elections
