= Carl Higbie =

American political activist and Navy SEAL (born 1983)

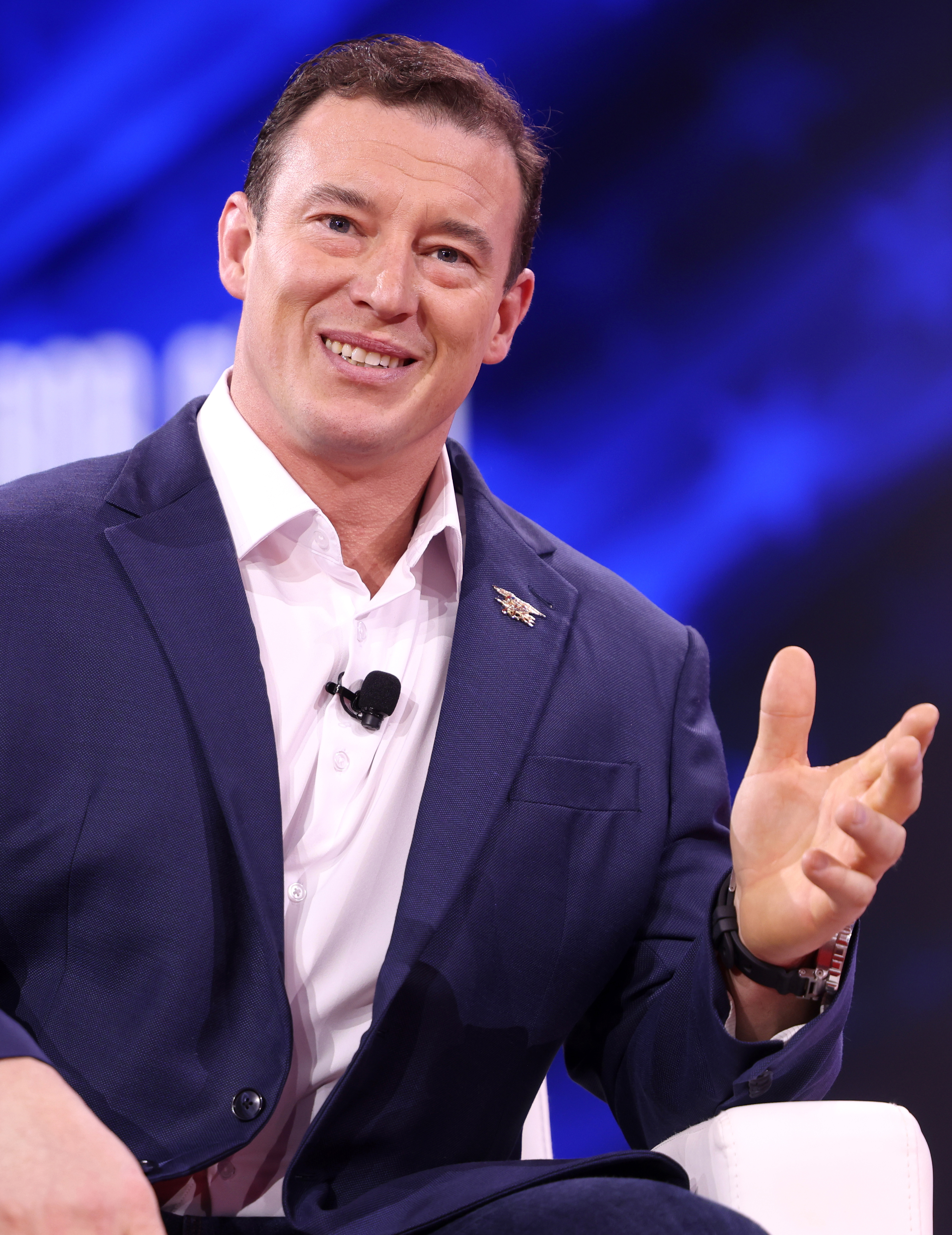
- Higbie in 2025
- Born: Carlton Milo Higbie IV; April 23, 1983 (age 43); Greenwich, Connecticut, U.S.
- Education: Greenwich High School
- Occupations: Writer, political activist
- Known for: Candidate for Connecticut's 4th congressional district in 2014
- Political party: Republican
- Board member of: Great America PAC, spokesman
- Children: 3
- Military career
- Branch: United States Navy
- Service years: 2005–2012
- Rank: Petty officer first class
- Unit: Navy SEALs
- Conflicts: Operation Iraqi Freedom
- Writing career
- Years active: 2012–present
- Subjects: Politics, war

Carlton Milo Higbie IV (born April 23, 1983) is an American conservative political activist, author, and former U.S. Navy SEAL. He was director of advocacy for America First Policies, a group that promotes Donald Trump's policy agenda. In August 2017, Higbie was selected to serve as the chief of external affairs for the Corporation for National and Community Service, resigning several months later after his comments denigrating minorities were discovered by media. He served as a spokesperson for Great America PAC, which supported Trump's 2016 presidential candidacy and assisted his transition into office.

In April 2023, Newsmax began airing Carl Higbie Frontline, a daily program hosted by Higbie.

Higbie served in the U.S. Navy from 2005 to 2012. He served two tours of duty in Operation Iraqi Freedom, reaching the rank of Special Warfare Operator, First Class. He has written two books about his experiences, and has regularly appeared as a commentator on Fox News, CNN, and Newsmax.

On February 5, 2024, he and two other people filed a lawsuit in the United States District Court for the Northern District of New York challenging New York's laws that ban non-residents from bringing and publicly carrying firearms in the state.

== Early and personal life ==
Higbie was born on April 23, 1983, in Greenwich, Connecticut. After graduating Greenwich High School, he attended college at Sacred Heart University before dropping out to join the military as troops were being deployed to Iraq. During his show on October 17, 2024, Higbie revealed that he has ADD, better known as ADHD. Higbie is married and has three children, one daughter and two sons. His daughter is from his first marriage and his sons are from his second.

== Military service ==
Higbie enlisted in the United States Navy and became a SEAL in 2005, ultimately reaching the rating of Special Warfare Operator, First Class. He was twice deployed to Iraq to serve in Operation Iraqi Freedom, once each under presidents George W. Bush and Barack Obama.

Higbie is the author a self-published book titled Battle on the Home Front: A Navy SEAL's Mission to Save the American Dream in 2012, after which his security clearance was downgraded from "top secret." He signed out of the SEALs before the end of his term of duty with an honorable discharge. Some two months later, the Navy downgraded his discharge to "general." However, upon appeal his Honorable Discharge was restored. A second book, Enemies, Foreign and Domestic: A SEAL's Story, was published by Post Hill Press in 2016.

== Congressional campaign ==
In 2014, Higbie announced that he was running to be the Republican Party nominee to challenge Democrat Jim Himes in Connecticut's 4th congressional district, declaring himself to not be "bound by the same conformist rules that most Republicans are bound by." At the time, Higbie was working as a personal trainer at Equinox in Greenwich, Connecticut. The other Republican candidates were former State Senator Dan Debicella and State Representative John Shaban. Higbie described himself as a social conservative with "moral oppositions to abortions and same-sex marriage, but my legislative position is live and let live," and stated that he would vote to repeal the Affordable Care Act. On economic issues, Higbie supported "a balanced budget amendment and an across-the-board personal income tax rate of 10 percent, with a maximum annual deduction of $50,000," and he favored eliminating corporate taxes to attract overseas businesses. Higbie had difficulty with fundraising during his candidacy, and sought to force a primary election if he were not endorsed as the candidate. Debicella won the nomination overwhelmingly, with support from 195 of the 210 delegates, but lost the general election to the incumbent, Jim Himes, who won with 53.7% of the vote.

== Great America PAC ==
Higbie is a spokesman for Great America PAC, an independent-expenditure only political action committee (Super PAC) which advocates for Donald Trump. In this capacity, he has acted as a Trump surrogate, appearing on news networks including Fox News and CNN. Higbie has discussed a variety of topics including the war in Iraq, the composition of the Trump transition team, the controversy relating to Khizr Khan's appearance at the Democratic National Convention, the proposal for a registry of Muslim immigrants, and the National Policy Institute conference.

=== Iraq ===
In a CNN interview with retired-Major General Paul Eaton and Chris Cuomo, Higbie was critical of the use of air power and drone strikes by the Obama administration and argued in support of Trump's promise to address problems in Iraq with "boots on the ground." He was also critical of Eaton, who was the U.S. Army Chief of Infantry and then the Commanding General of the Coalition Military Assistance Training Team in Iraq (2003–2004), stating that the leadership "[Eaton's] articulated here today is not conducive to winning a war."

=== Trump transition team ===
During the transition following the 2016 presidential election, Higbie defended Steve Bannon from accusations of anti-Semitism, misogyny, and racism. Of Bannon's appointment as chief strategist to President-elect Trump, Higbie said: "Steve Bannon has excelled in every single role he has held dating back to his service in the US Navy. I cannot imagine a better person to be advising an already successful businessman taking on the biggest business in the world, the US Government."

== Television ==
Higbie started hosting Saturday Report on Newsmax TV in 2020 and has also filled in as guest host for other Newsmax hosts. In 2022 he quit Saturday Report to host Wake Up America Weekend. In April 2023 he got his own nightly show Carl Higbie Frontline airing at 5PM ET, replacing Spicer & Co. after Sean Spicer's departure from Newsmax. In September 2025 Newsmax announced Carl Higbie Frontline would air at 6PM ET.

== Controversy ==
=== Registry of Muslims ===
In an interview with Megyn Kelly of Fox News, Higbie cited the internment of Japanese Americans during World War II and the associated Supreme Court decision in Korematsu v. United States as providing legal justification for Trump's campaign promise of a registry for Muslim Americans. Higbie repeated his comments on CNN to Erin Burnett the following day. Kelly replied that Higbie "knows better" than to make such suggestions, as they scare people. Kelly met Higbie's further assertion that he was only noting "there was precedent for it" with the declaration: "You can't be citing Japanese internment camps for anything the President-elect is going to do." Trump's transition team later issued a statement to the Huffington Post that denied that Trump supported a Muslim registry, though he had made comments supporting such an idea in 2015.

George Takei, who was detained in one of the World War II internment camps, described Higbie's comments as "dangerous" and went on to say that "[r]egistration of any group of people, and certainly registration of Muslims, is a prelude to internment." Higbie's comments attracted media criticism, and Representative Judy Chu (D–CA), the first Chinese American woman elected to the U.S. Congress, declared that "[a]ny proposal to force American Muslims to register with the federal government, and to use Japanese imprisonment during World War II as precedent, is abhorrent and has no place in our society. These ideas are based on tactics of fear, division, and hate that we must condemn." Constitutional lawyer Bruce Fein addressed Higbie's suggestion that Korematsu could be used to support a Muslim registry, describing the case as having "joined Dred Scott as an odious and discredited artifact of popular bigotry" even though it has never been overturned. Harvard University's Noah Feldman concurred, declaring that "Korematsu's uniquely bad legal status means it's not precedent even though it hasn't been overturned."

=== Corporation for National and Community Service resignation ===
In 2018, Higbie was forced to resign as the Chief of External Affairs for the Corporation for National and Community Service (an organization which runs AmeriCorps, Learn and Serve America, Senior Corps, and other national service initiatives), a position to which Trump had appointed him. His ousting occurred after CNN discovered Higbie's racist and inflammatory remarks (on a 2013 radio talk show) about Black Americans, Muslims, women, LGBT people, veterans suffering from PTSD, welfare recipients, and immigrants, which included suggesting withdrawing the right to vote from welfare recipients, and advocating free rein for all to go and shoot undocumented immigrants at the southern USA border. Higbie had also repeatedly stated his belief that Barack Obama is Muslim and not a U.S. citizen.

In a 2018 tweet, Higbie apologized for his comments, though later that year he maintained his statements had been taken out of context.
