= 2010 United States House of Representatives elections in Connecticut =

- November 2, 2010

All 5 Connecticut seats to the United States House of Representatives
	Majority party	Minority party
Party	Democratic	Republican
Last election	5	0
Seats won	5	0
Seat change	Steady	Steady
Popular vote	667,983	460,286
Percentage	58.69%	40.44%
Swing	▼6.60%	▲7.71%

Democratic
40–50%
50–60%
60–70%
70–80%
80–90%
Republican
40–50%
50–60%
60–70%

The 2010 United States House of Representatives elections in Connecticut took place on Tuesday, November 2, 2010, to elect the five Congressional representatives from the state, one from each of the state's five Congressional districts. The elections coincided with the elections of other federal and state offices, including governor, U.S. Senate, and state legislature races.

The incumbent state Congressional delegation, elected in 2008, consisted of five Democratic representatives. All were re-elected in the 2010 elections.

Primary elections were necessary to select Republican candidates in all districts except the Third, while no Democratic candidates faced primary challenges. The GOP primaries took place on Tuesday, August 10, 2010.

== Overview ==
The table below shows the total number and percentage of votes, as well as the number of seats gained and lost by each political party in the election for the United States House of Representatives in Connecticut. In addition, the voter turnout and the number of votes not valid will be listed below.

United States House of Representatives elections in Connecticut, 2010
Party	Votes	Percentage	Seats
Democratic	667,983 †	58.69%	5
Republican	460,286 ‡	40.44%	0
Green	8,892	0.78%	0
Socialist Action	955	0.08%	0
Write-in candidates	86	<0.01%	0
Total	1,138,202	100%	5

† Includes 33,036 votes received on the line of the Connecticut Working Families Party, which cross-endorsed the Democratic candidate in each of the five districts.
‡ Includes 2,310 votes received by Republican Sam Caliguiri on the independent line in the Fifth District.

=== By district ===
Results of the 2010 United States House of Representatives elections in Connecticut by district:

District	Democratic		Republican		Others		Total		Result
District	Votes	%	Votes	%	Votes	%	Votes	%	Result
District 1	130,538	57.75%	84,076	37.20%	11,424	5.05%	226,038	100.0%	Democratic hold
District 2	140,888	57.08%	95,671	38.76%	10,250	4.15%	246,809	100.0%	Democratic hold
District 3	134,544	60.97%	74,107	33.58%	12,010	5.44%	220,661	100.0%	Democratic hold
District 4	110,746	50.94%	102,030	46.93%	4,615	2.12%	217,391	100.0%	Democratic hold
District 5	118,231	52.01%	102,092	44.91%	6,980	3.07%	227,303	100.0%	Democratic hold
Total	634,947	55.78%	457,976	40.24%	45,279	3.98%	1,138,202	100.0%	

== District 1 ==
2010 Connecticut's 1st congressional district election
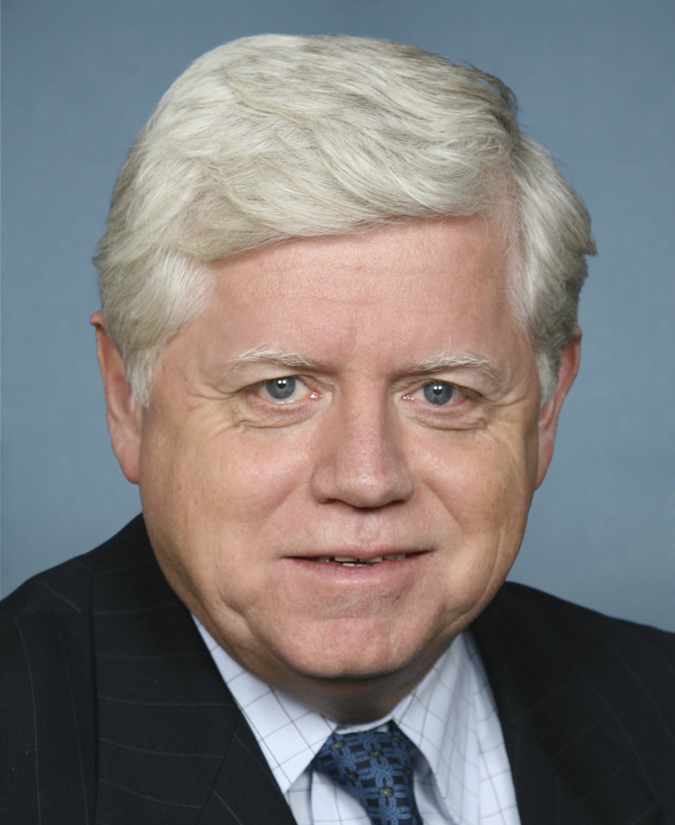

Nominee	John B. Larson	Ann Brickley
Party	Democratic	Republican
Popular vote	138,440	84,076
Percentage	61.3%	37.2%
- Municipality results Larson: 50–60% 60–70% 70–80% 80–90% Brickley: 50–60% 60–70%
U.S. Representative before election
John B. Larson
Democratic
Elected U.S. Representative
John B. Larson
Democratic

Incumbent Democratic Congressman John B. Larson was challenged by Republican Ann Brickley, Green Party candidate Kenneth J. Krayeske, and Socialist Action candidate Christopher J. Hutchinson.

- Race ranking and details from CQ Politics
- Campaign contributions from OpenSecrets
- Race profile at The New York Times

=== Polling ===
October polls conducted by the website CT Capitol Report showed Larson leading Brickley by seven- and 18-point margins.

Poll source	Dates administered	John Larson (D)	Ann Brickley (R)
CT Capitol Report/Merriman River Group	October 24–26, 2010	55.8%	38.3%
CT Capitol Report/Merriman River Group	October 3–5, 2010	51.8%	44.7%

==== Predictions ====
Source	Ranking	As of
The Cook Political Report	Safe D	November 1, 2010
Rothenberg	Safe D	November 1, 2010
Sabato's Crystal Ball	Safe D	November 1, 2010
RCP	Likely D	November 1, 2010
CQ Politics	Safe D	October 28, 2010
New York Times	Safe D	November 1, 2010
FiveThirtyEight	Safe D	November 1, 2010

=== Results ===
Representative in Congress (CT-1), November 2, 2010
Party	Candidate	Votes	%
Republican	Ann Brickley	84,076	37.20
Democratic	John B. Larson	138,440	61.25
Green	Kenneth J. Krayeske	2,564	1.13
Socialist Action	Christopher J. Hutchinson	955	0.42
Write-In	Daniel J. Stepanek	3	<0.1
Total votes		226,038	100

Note: Larson also appeared on the line of the Connecticut Working Families Party and received 7,902 votes on it. His Working Families and Democratic votes have been aggregated together on this table.

== District 2 ==
2010 Connecticut's 2nd congressional district election

Nominee	Joe Courtney	Janet Peckinpaugh
Party	Democratic	Republican
Popular vote	147,748	95,671
Percentage	59.9%	38.8%
- Municipality results Courtney: 40–50% 50–60% 60–70% 70–80% Peckinpaugh: 50–60%
U.S. Representative before election
Joe Courtney
Democratic
Elected U.S. Representative
Joe Courtney
Democratic

Incumbent Democratic Congressman Joe Courtney was challenged by Republican Janet Peckinpaugh, a former NBC Connecticut anchorwoman. Also running was Green Party candidate Scott Deshefy. Courtney was also cross-endorsed by the Connecticut Working Families Party.

- Race ranking and details from CQ Politics
- Campaign contributions from OpenSecrets
- Race profile at The New York Times

=== Polling ===
October polls conducted by the website CT Capitol Report had shown Courtney leading Peckinpaugh by 14- and 19-point margins.

Poll source	Dates administered	Joe Courtney (D)	Janet Peckinpaugh (R)
CT Capitol Report/Merriman River Group	October 24–26, 2010	57.2%	38%
CT Capitol Report/Merriman River Group	October 3–5, 2010	55.0	41.3%

==== Predictions ====
Source	Ranking	As of
The Cook Political Report	Safe D	November 1, 2010
Rothenberg	Safe D	November 1, 2010
Sabato's Crystal Ball	Safe D	November 1, 2010
RCP	Likely D	November 1, 2010
CQ Politics	Safe D	October 28, 2010
New York Times	Safe D	November 1, 2010
FiveThirtyEight	Safe D	November 1, 2010

=== Results ===
Representative in Congress (CT-2), November 2, 2010
Party	Candidate	Votes	%
Republican	Janet Peckinpaugh	95,671	38.76
Democratic	Joe Courtney	147,748	59.86
Green	G. Scott Deshefy	3,344	1.35
Write-In	Daniel Reale	27	<0.1
Write-In	Muriel P. Bianchi	19	<0.1
Total votes		246,809	100

Note: Courtney also appeared on the line of the Connecticut Working Families Party and received 6,860 votes on it. His Working Families and Democratic votes have been aggregated together on this table.

== District 3 ==
2010 Connecticut's 3rd congressional district election
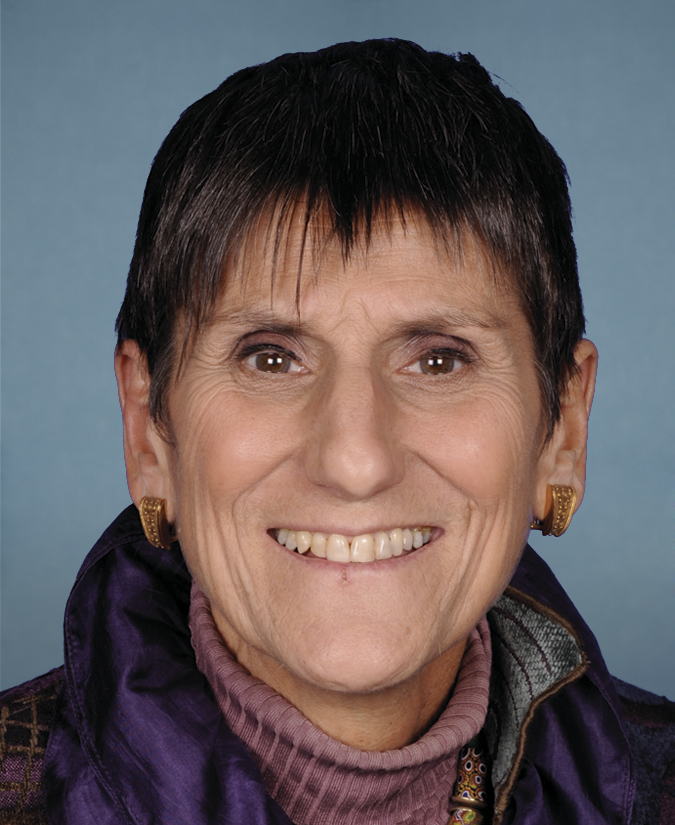

Nominee	Rosa L. DeLauro	Jerry Labriola, Jr.
Party	Democratic	Republican
Popular vote	143,565	74,107
Percentage	65.1%	33.6%
- Municipality results Delauro: 40–50% 50–60% 60–70% 70–80% 80–90% Labriola: 50–60% 90–100%
U.S. Representative before election
Rosa L. DeLauro
Democratic
Elected U.S. Representative
Rosa L. DeLauro
Democratic

Incumbent Democratic Congresswoman Rosa L. DeLauro was challenged by Connecticut Republican Party treasurer Jerry Labriola Jr. and Green Party nominee Charles Pillsbury.

- Race ranking and details from CQ Politics
- Campaign contributions from OpenSecrets
- Race profile at The New York Times

=== Polling ===
October polls conducted by the website CT Capitol Report had shown DeLauro leading Labriola by the largest margins of any of the state's five congressional districts.

Poll source	Dates administered	Rosa DeLauro (D)	Jerry Labriola (R)
CT Capitol Report/Merriman River Group	October 24–26, 2010	56%	37.9%
CT Capitol Report/Merriman River Group	October 3–5, 2010	58.1%	36.5%

==== Predictions ====
Source	Ranking	As of
The Cook Political Report	Safe D	November 1, 2010
Rothenberg	Safe D	November 1, 2010
Sabato's Crystal Ball	Safe D	November 1, 2010
RCP	Safe D	November 1, 2010
CQ Politics	Safe D	October 28, 2010
New York Times	Safe D	November 1, 2010
FiveThirtyEight	Safe D	November 1, 2010

=== Results ===
Representative in Congress (CT-3), November 2, 2010
Party	Candidate	Votes	%
Democratic	Rosa L. DeLauro	143,565	65.06
Republican	Jerry Labriola, Jr.	74,107	33.58
Green	Charles A. Pillsbury	2,984	1.35
Write-In	Boaz Itshaky	5	<0.1
Total votes		220,661	100

Note: DeLauro also appeared on the line of the Connecticut Working Families Party and received 9,021 votes on it. Her Working Families and Democratic votes have been aggregated together on this table.

== District 4 ==
2010 Connecticut's 4th congressional district election

Nominee	Jim Himes	Dan Debicella
Party	Democratic	Republican
Popular vote	115,351	102,030
Percentage	53.1%	46.9%
- Municipality results Himes: 50–60% 60–70% 80–90% Debicella: 50–60% 60–70%
U.S. Representative before election
Jim Himes
Democratic
Elected U.S. Representative
Jim Himes
Democratic

Incumbent Democratic Congressman Jim Himes was challenged by Republican State Senator Dan Debicella.

- Race ranking and details from CQ Politics
- Campaign contributions from OpenSecrets
- Race profile at The New York Times

=== Polling ===
October polling had shown this race to have essentially been a toss-up.

Poll source	Dates administered	Jim Himes (D)	Dan Debicella (R)
CT Capitol Report/Merriman River Group	October 24–26, 2010	46.1%	48%
National Research	October 17–18, 2010	42%	46%
CT Capitol Report/Merriman River Group	October 3–5, 2010	49.4%	47.2%
National Research	September 27–28, 2010	42%	42%
National Research	August 17–18, 2010	42%	38%
American Action Forum	July 28-Aug. 1, 2010	46%	42%

==== Predictions ====
Source	Ranking	As of
The Cook Political Report	Lean D	November 1, 2010
Rothenberg	Likely D	November 1, 2010
Sabato's Crystal Ball	Lean D	November 1, 2010
RCP	Tossup	November 1, 2010
CQ Politics	Lean D	October 28, 2010
New York Times	Lean D	November 1, 2010
FiveThirtyEight	Lean D	November 1, 2010

=== Results ===
Representative in Congress (CT-4), November 2, 2010
Party	Candidate	Votes	%
Republican	Dan Debicella	102,030	46.93
Democratic	Jim Himes	115,351	53.06
Write-In	Eugene Flanagan	10	<0.1
Total votes		217,391	100

Note: Himes also appeared on the line of the Connecticut Working Families Party and received 4,605 votes on it. His Working Families and Democratic votes have been aggregated together on this table.

== District 5 ==
2010 Connecticut's 5th congressional district election
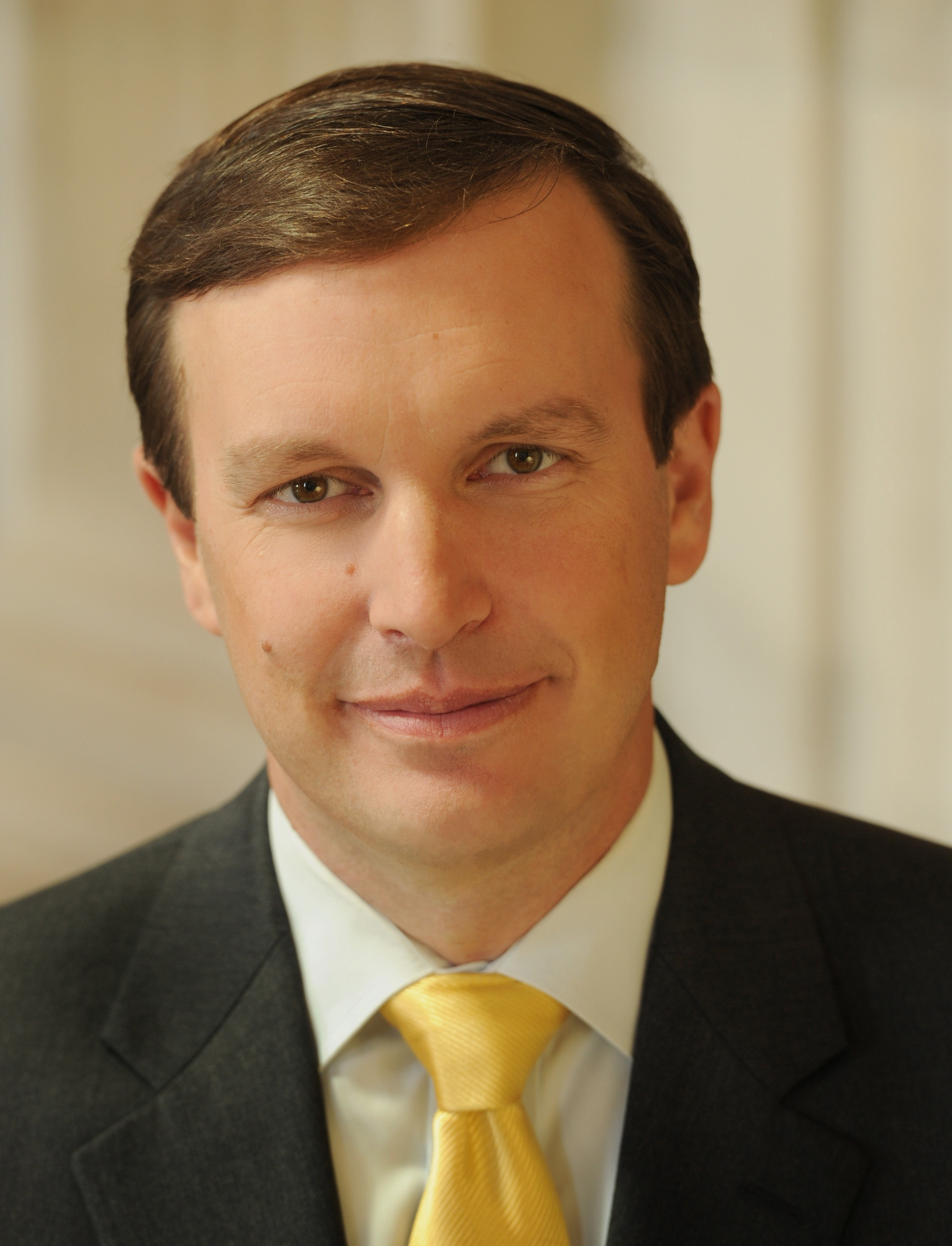

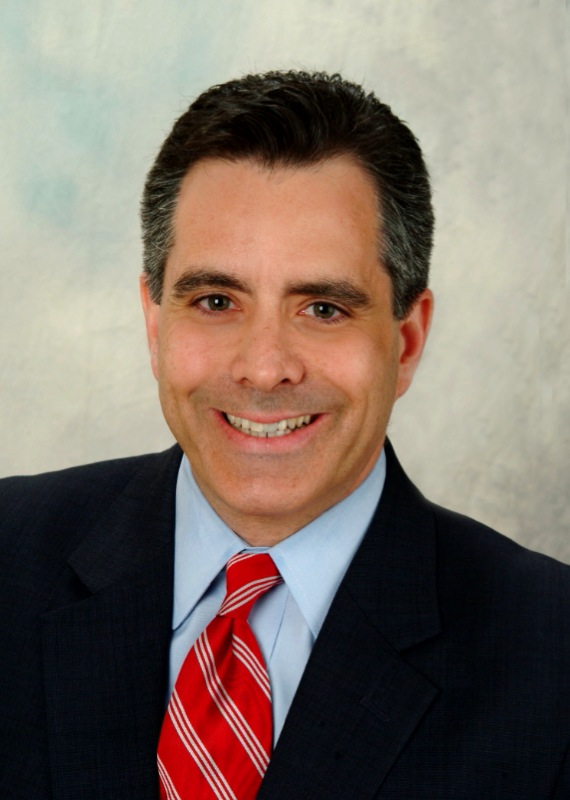
Nominee	Chris Murphy	Sam Caligiuri
Party	Democratic	Republican
Alliance	Working Families
Popular vote	122,879	104,402
Percentage	54.1%	45.9%
- Municipality results Murphy: 50–60% 60–70% 70–80% Caligiuri: 50–60% 60–70%
U.S. Representative before election
Chris Murphy
Democratic
Elected U.S. Representative
Chris Murphy
Democratic

Incumbent Democratic Congressman Chris Murphy was challenged by Republican State Senator Sam Caligiuri.

- Race ranking and details from CQ Politics
- Campaign contributions from OpenSecrets
- Race profile at The New York Times

=== Polling ===
The last polling in this district before the election, as conducted by the website CT Capitol Report, had essentially indicated this race was a toss up.

Poll source	Dates administered	Chris Murphy (D)	Sam Caligiuri (R)
CT Capitol Report/Merriman River Group	October 28–31, 2010	43.8%	51.5%
CT Capitol Report/Merriman River Group	October 24–26, 2010	45.5%	46.9%
Gotham Research Group †	October 4–6, 2010	48%	34%
CT Capitol Report/Merriman River Group	October 3–5, 2010	44.3%	49.7%
Gotham Research Group †	September 19–21, 2010	50%	37%
National Research	August 30–31, 2010	40%	39%

† Internal poll commissioned for Murphy campaign

==== Predictions ====
Source	Ranking	As of
The Cook Political Report	Lean D	November 1, 2010
Rothenberg	Likely D	November 1, 2010
Sabato's Crystal Ball	Lean D	November 1, 2010
RCP	Tossup	November 1, 2010
CQ Politics	Likely D	October 28, 2010
New York Times	Lean D	November 1, 2010
FiveThirtyEight	Tossup	November 1, 2010

=== Results ===
Representative in Congress (CT-5), November 2, 2010
Party	Candidate	Votes	%
Republican	Sam S. F. Caligiuri	104,402	45.93
Democratic	Chris Murphy	122,879	54.06
Write-In	Elmon Smith	2	<0.1
Write-In	John Pistone	20	<0.1
Total votes		227,303	100

Note: Murphy also appeared on the line of the Connecticut Working Families Party and received 4,648 votes on it. His Working Families and Democratic votes have been aggregated together on this table. Caligiuri also appeared on the independent line and received 2,310 votes on it. His independent and Republican votes have been aggregated together on this table.

Preceded by 2008 elections	United States House elections in Connecticut; 2010	Succeeded by 2012 elections
