= Rosa DeLauro =

American politician (born 1943)

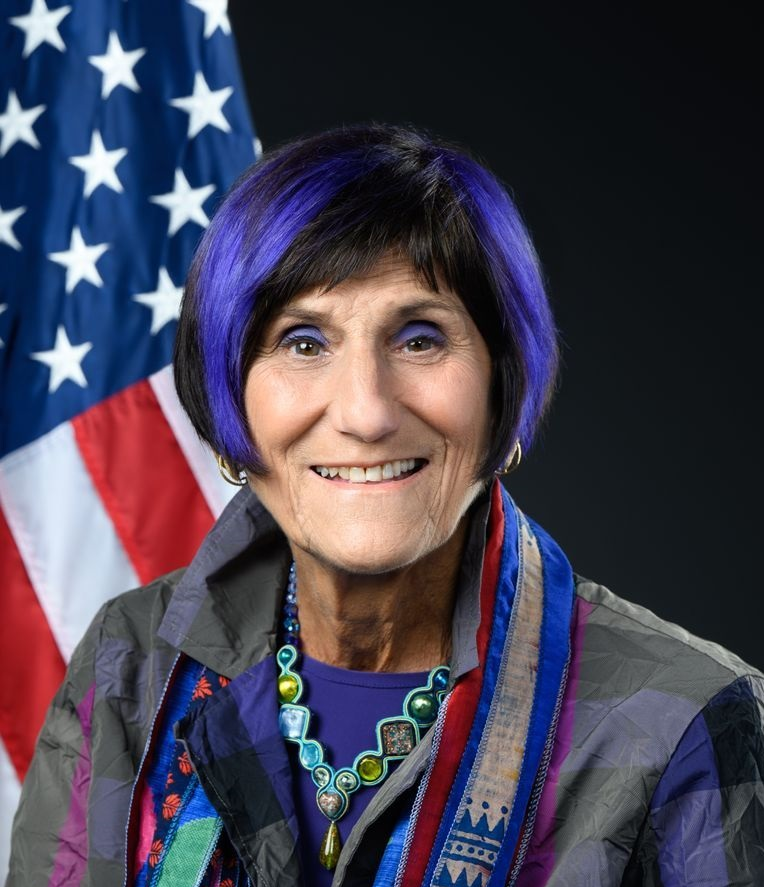
- Official portrait, 2023

Ranking Member of the House Appropriations Committee
- Incumbent
- Assumed office January 3, 2023
- Preceded by: Kay Granger

Chair of the House Appropriations Committee
- In office January 3, 2021 – January 3, 2023
- Preceded by: Nita Lowey
- Succeeded by: Kay Granger

Co-Chair of the House Democratic Steering Committee
- In office January 3, 2003 – January 3, 2021
- Leader: Nancy Pelosi
- Preceded by: Steny Hoyer
- Succeeded by: Cheri Bustos

Member of the U.S. House of Representatives from Connecticut's 3rd district
- Incumbent
- Assumed office January 3, 1991
- Preceded by: Bruce Morrison

Personal details
- Born: Rosa Luisa DeLauro; March 2, 1943 (age 83) New Haven, Connecticut, U.S.
- Party: Democratic
- Spouse: Stan Greenberg (m. 1978)
- Children: 3
- Education: Marymount College (BA); London School of Economics (attended); Columbia University (MA)
- Website: House website Campaign website
- DeLauro's voice DeLauro supporting a House resolution recognizing the African American spiritual as a national treasure Recorded February 7, 2007

Rosa Luisa DeLauro (/dɪˈlɔːroʊ/ dih-LOR-oh; born March 2, 1943) is an American politician serving as the U.S. representative for Connecticut's 3rd congressional district since 1991. She is a member of the Democratic Party. The district is based in New Haven and includes most of its suburbs. DeLauro has been the dean of Connecticut's congressional delegation since 2013 upon the retirement of Senator Joe Lieberman.

In 2020, DeLauro was selected as chair of the House Appropriations Committee for the 117th Congress, succeeding Nita Lowey, and becoming the second woman to hold the position. She co-chaired the House Democratic Steering Committee from 2003 to 2021.

== Early life, education, and early political career ==
DeLauro was born in New Haven, Connecticut, to an Italian-American family, the daughter of Luisa "Louise" (née Canestri), a New Haven alderwoman, and Theodore J. "Ted" DeLauro, an Italian immigrant. She earned her high school diploma from The Academy of Our Lady of Mercy, Lauralton Hall in Milford, Connecticut. She earned a bachelor of arts degree from Marymount College in Tarrytown, New York, attended the London School of Economics, and earned a master of arts degree in international politics from Columbia University..

Before entering the House of Representatives, DeLauro worked as Senator Chris Dodd's chief of staff and campaign manager, was the executive director of EMILY's List, and coordinated 1988 Democratic presidential nominee Michael Dukakis's tristate area campaign.

== U.S. House of Representatives ==
=== Elections ===
In 1990, four-term incumbent U.S. Representative Bruce Morrison of Connecticut's 3rd congressional district retired in order to run for governor of Connecticut. DeLauro sought the open seat and she quickly consolidated Democratic support behind her, earning Morrison's endorsement and prompting State Representative Mike Lawlor's withdrawal from the campaign. DeLauro defeated Republican State Senator Thomas Scott 52%–48% in a particularly brutal general election with ad hominem attacks against her, in which her opponent Scott said that DeLauro had kept her maiden name only to appeal to the region's Italian voters. State Republican chair Richard Foley characterized DeLauro as "Walter Mondale in drag". The campaign was equally combative over policy matters, with both candidates' microphones cut off during a radio debate after repeated attacks over abortion and capital punishment.

Since then, the congressional district campaigns have returned to being more civil and DeLauro has never faced another contest nearly so close as her first. She has been re-elected seventeen times, maintaining at least 56% of the vote each election.

==== 2006 ====
In 2006, DeLauro was re-elected to a ninth term, defeating Republican nominee Joseph Vollano with 76% of the vote.

==== 2008 ====
DeLauro was reelected to a tenth term with 77% of the vote.

==== 2010 ====
DeLauro was re-elected to an eleventh term with 65% of the vote against Connecticut Republican Party treasurer Jerry Labriola Jr.

==== 2012 ====
DeLauro was re-elected to a twelfth term with 74.6% of the vote against Republican nominee Wayne Winsley, a former member of the U.S. Navy.

==== 2014 ====
DeLauro was re-elected to a thirteenth term with 67.1% of the vote against Republican nominee James Brown, a high school math teacher.

==== 2016 ====
DeLauro was re-elected to a fourteenth term with 69% of the vote against Republican nominee Angel Cadena, a former candidate for Connecticut State Comptroller.

==== 2018 ====
DeLauro was re-elected to a fifteenth term with 64.6% of the vote in a second consecutive election against Cadena.

==== 2020 ====
DeLauro was re-elected to a sixteenth term with 58.7% of the vote to Margaret Streicker's 39.8%.

==== 2022 ====
DeLauro was re-elected to a seventeenth term with 56.8% of the vote to Lesley DeNardis's 40.7%.

==== 2024 ====
DeLauro was re-elected to an eighteenth term with 58.9% of the vote to Michael Massey's 41.1%.

=== Tenure ===
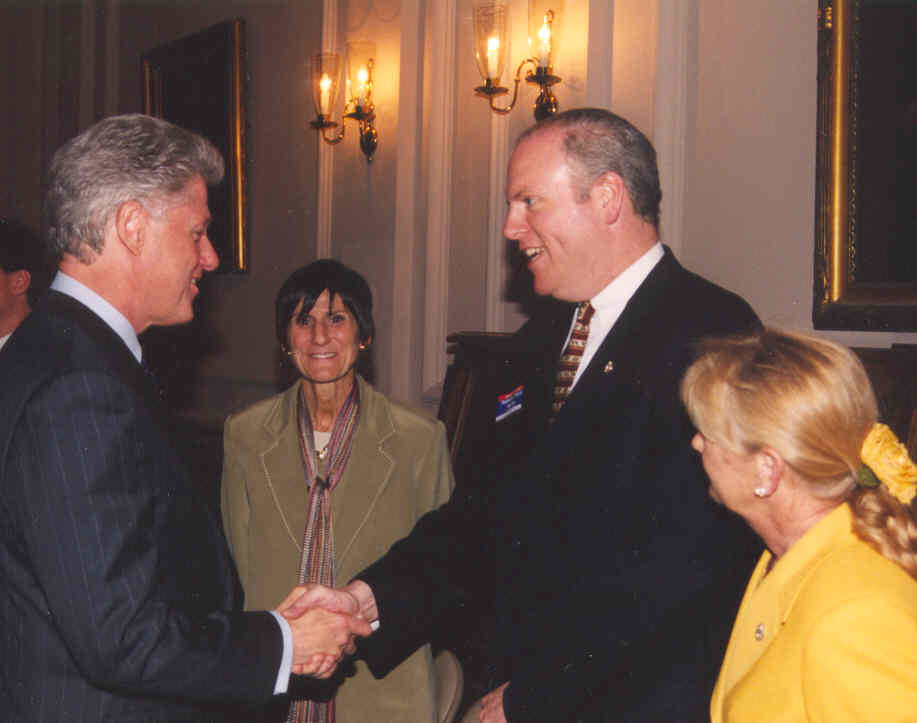
DeLauro with Congressman Joe Crowley and President Bill Clinton in 1999

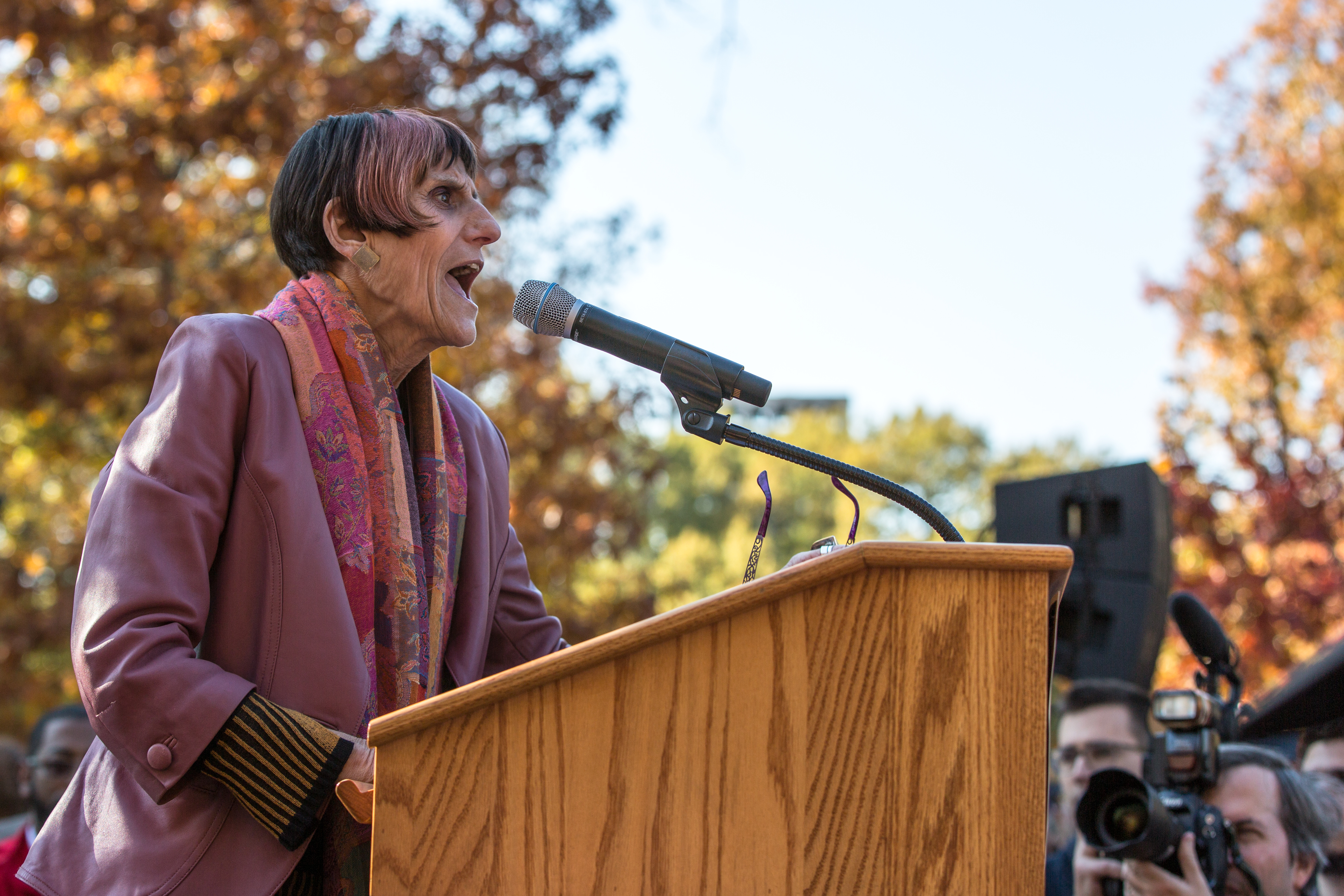
DeLauro speaking at a D.C. rally in 2016

DeLauro is part of the progressive wing of the Democratic Party and one of the Congressional Progressive Caucus's founding members.

DeLauro is interested in health policy issues, particularly women's health. She has introduced bills aimed at improving cancer treatment and research, as well as for women's health policies. As chair of the appropriations subcommittee that funds the Food and Drug Administration (FDA), she has criticized its failures to protect the public from unsafe foods and medical products.

On February 2, 2008, DeLauro endorsed Barack Obama for President.

On October 3, 2008, DeLauro voted a second time for the Emergency Economic Stabilization Act of 2008. Since June 24, 1997, and in each of her terms (16 total) since, she has worked to pass the Paycheck Fairness Act. She has urged politicians to be "big thinkers" on universal health care.

On December 17, 2008, the Wall Street Journal reported that DeLauro was "a top contender" for Labor Secretary in the Obama administration. Obama ultimately nominated California Representative Hilda Solis for the position.

DeLauro was critical of the Stupak-Pitts Amendment that places limits on taxpayer-funded abortions in the context of the November 2009 Affordable Health Care for America Act.

DeLauro was a supporter of David Bonior in his race against Steny Hoyer for House Majority Whip in 1991, and seconded the nomination at a meeting of the Democratic caucus. DeLauro cited their work together during the Iran-Contra scandal and said that Bonior's "position as whip will not impact the momentum the choice issue has in Congress right now".

DeLauro has spoken about child care, arguing, "It is time to build a permanent child care infrastructure that respects and values women in the workforce" in a July 2021 article published in The American Prospect. The statement also appeared on her official website.

In December 2024, DeLauro garnered attention for a speech in the House during debate on H.R. 10515, a bill to avert a government shutdown, where she called Elon Musk "President Musk" and called attention to his investments in China. Musk shot back at DeLauro by calling her an "awful creature" and saying that he believes the Democratic congresswoman "needs to be expelled from Congress!"

In June 2025, DeLauro confronted Office of Management and Budget director Russell Vought, who is a principal author of Project 2025 and appeared before the House Appropriations Committee, regarding his testimony about the objective of planned cuts to promote government efficiency. She said, "Be honest, this is never about government efficiency. In fact, an efficient government, a government that capably serves the American people and proves good government is achievable is what you fear the most. You want a government so broken, so dysfunctional, so starved of resources, so full of incompetent political lackeys and bereft of experts and professionals that its departments and agencies cannot feasibly achieve the goals and the missions to which they are lawfully directed. Your goal is privatization, for the biggest companies to have unchecked power, for an economy that does not work for the middle class, for working and vulnerable families. You want the American people to have no one to turn to, but to the billionaires and the corporations this administration has put in charge. Waste, fraud, and abuse are not the targets of this administration. They are your primary objectives."

On September 19, 2025, DeLauro was one of 95 Democrats in Congress who joined all of their Republican colleagues in voting to honor the life and legacy of political activist Charlie Kirk.

=== Committee assignments ===
For the 119th Congress:

- Committee on Appropriations (Ranking Member)
  - Subcommittee on Labor, Health and Human Services, Education, and Related Agencies (Ranking Member)

=== Caucus memberships ===
- Black Maternal Health Caucus
- House Democratic Steering and Policy Committee (co-chair for steering) from 2003 to 2021
- Congressional Equality Caucus
- Populist Caucus
- Congressional Arts Caucus
- Afterschool Caucuses
- Congressional NextGen 9-1-1 Caucus
- Congressional Progressive Caucus
- Congressional Coalition on Adoption
- Congressional Ukraine Caucus
- Rare Disease Caucus

== Political positions ==
=== Abortion ===
DeLauro supports abortion rights. As chair of the Labor, Health and Human Services, Education, and Related Agencies Appropriations Subcommittee, she has opposed the Hyde Amendment based on evidence of its discriminatory impact.

In 2006, she voted against the Child Interstate Abortion Notification Act.

=== Alternative proteins ===
DeLauro is a longtime supporter of alternative proteins, including cultivated meat. In 2018, she authored a letter to the Government Accountability Office requesting a review of the federal regulatory framework for cultivated foods. In 2021, she called for parity in federal research funding for alternative proteins so that "the United States can continue to be a global leader on alternative protein science."

=== Food safety and public health ===
DeLauro is a co-chair of the Congressional Food Safety Caucus and has been critical of the food industry and intensive animal farming practices. During the mad cow crisis in the early 2000s, DeLauro criticized the beef industry for practicing low animal welfare standards and allowing downer cattle to enter the food supply.

In 2009, DeLauro authored a version of the FDA Food Safety Modernization Act, which was later enacted into law in 2011. In 2019, she authored the Expanded Food Safety Investigation Act, which would have granted the Food and Drug Administration (FDA) authority to investigate concentrated animal feeding operations linked to disease outbreaks and public health concerns. Following the 2022 United States infant formula shortage, DeLauro proposed restructuring the FDA by spinning off its food safety responsibilities into a separate Food Safety Administration.

In July 2021, in response to the ongoing COVID-19 pandemic, DeLauro and Representative Nancy Mace introduced legislation to prohibit the farming of mink for fur, citing concerns that mink farming promotes the spread of zoonotic disease. The legislation was passed by the House of Representatives as part of the America COMPETES Act, but was not passed by the Senate.

=== Guns ===
DeLauro has voted for stronger regulation of firearms. In 2006, she voted against the Trigger Lock Amendment that ends the use of funds from the Commerce Department FY2007 Appropriation bill to enforce laws requiring guns to be sold with locks. In 1999, DeLauro voted to increase the amount of time given to perform background checks from 24 hours to 72 hours. In 1998, she voted to increase the minimum gun crime sentence. On January 14, 2013, she introduced a bill allowing for the voluntary surrender of assault-type weapons with compensation in the form of tax credits. She has an F rating from the NRA Political Victory Fund.

=== Health care ===
DeLauro sponsored the Birth Defects Prevention, Risk Reduction, and Awareness Act of 2010 (H.R. 5462). This bill allows the Secretary of Health and Human Services to create a birth defects prevention, risk reduction, and awareness program. The program aims to increase awareness of pregnancy and breastfeeding by starting a nationwide media campaign and provides grants for research on certain exposures that affect pregnancy and breastfed infants. In November 2010, it was received by the Senate and referred to the Committee on Health, Education, Labor, and Pensions (HELP). It was not voted on by the Senate.

In July 2014, DeLauro introduced the Sugar-Sweetened Beverages Tax Act, also known as the "SWEET Act", which would impose a one-cent excise tax per teaspoon of caloric sweetener in soda, energy drinks, sports drinks, and sweet teas (roughly nine cents on a 12-ounce soda). "This act is intended to discourage excessive consumption of sugar-sweetened beverages by increasing the price of these products", according to the text of the legislation. DeLauro and other supporters of the act argued that it could help address the national epidemics of obesity and diabetes by discouraging consumers from consuming the products and also raise money to fund prevention, treatment programs, research, and dietary education to help reduce the costs of related health problems. The bill was co-sponsored by several House members and progressed on to the House Energy and Commerce committee for Health as well as the House Committee on Ways and Means, but went no further. It was opposed by the American Beverage Association and the National Automatic Merchandising Association (NAMA), which said, "People don't support taxes and bans on common grocery items, like soft drinks" and that sweetened beverages "are not the main source of added sugars for children and teens and that a tax on sugary drinks unfairly singles out the industry."

=== Hurricane Irene ===
In August 2011, the 3rd district suffered extreme damage when Hurricane Irene made landfall along the Connecticut coastline. Many homes were destroyed in East Haven and other shore communities, and many Connecticut residents lost power for days. When Irene hit the state and during the immediate aftermath, DeLauro was vacationing along Italy's Amalfi Coast and was not scheduled to return until five days after the storm had passed. A Hartford Courant column rated DeLauro's storm response an "F". DeLauro told the New Haven Register she had "no apology for taking a vacation" and being out of state during the storm.

=== Immigration enforcement ===
After the killing of Renée Good by an ICE agent, DeLauro opposed funding increases for ICE without committing to supporting funding cuts. She opposed abolishing ICE, despite appeals from Connecticut clergy.

=== Voting rights ===
In 2002, DeLauro voted for the Help America Vote Act. This act provided $3.9 billion to modernize technology and create new programs to reach a higher standard and to make voting an easier process for disabled citizens, military personnel, citizens living abroad, and first-time voters without valid identification. In 2006, DeLauro voted against the Federal Election Integrity Act of 2006 that required voters to show a government-issued photo ID before voting.

== Personal life ==
DeLauro is married to political strategist Stan Greenberg. She has three children and is a grandmother of five. At age 80, DeLauro got a tattoo, a purple and red rose design, to celebrate her eldest granddaughter's eighteenth birthday. In 2023, she mentioned she possibly plans to get more tattoos when her four other grandchildren reach age eighteen, as well.

DeLauro was treated for ovarian cancer in 1986. Because the cancer was caught extremely early at stage 1, she made a full recovery and has been cancer-free for more than 40 years. She continues to support biomedical research, including efforts to develop a reliable screening test for ovarian cancer.

She is an honorary board member of the National Organization of Italian American Women. DeLauro is also a leader in the Catholic Democrats group. She is a close friend of former U.S. president Joe Biden, whom she met when serving as chief of staff to Chris Dodd in the U.S. Senate. She is credited with having been a mentor to Biden's son, Hunter, when he attended Yale Law School.

== Awards ==
- 2009 Health Policy Hero Award from the National Center for Health Research
- 2019 Foremothers Lifetime Achievement Award from the National Center for Health Research

== Electoral history ==
US House election, 1990: Connecticut District 3
Party	Candidate	Votes	%	±%
Democratic	Rosa DeLauro	90,772	52.10%	−14.39
Republican	Tom Scott	83,440	47.90%	+14.39
Total votes		174,212	100%	
Democratic hold				

US House election, 1992: Connecticut District 3
Party	Candidate	Votes	%	±%
Democratic	Rosa DeLauro	112,022	45.26%	−6.84
A Connecticut Party	Rosa DeLauro	50,546	20.42%	+20.42
Total	Rosa DeLauro (inc.)	162,568	65.68%	+13.58
Republican	Tom Scott	84,952	34.32%	−13.58
Total votes		247,520	100%	
Democratic hold				

US House election, 1994: Connecticut District 3
Party	Candidate	Votes	%	±%
Democratic	Rosa DeLauro (inc.)	111,261	63.45%	−2.23
Republican	Susan Johnson	53,110	30.29%	−4.03
A Connecticut Party	Susan Johnson	10,984	6.26%	−14.16
Total	Susan Johnson	64,094	36.55%	N/A
Total votes		175,355	100%	
Democratic hold				

US House election, 1996: Connecticut District 3
Party	Candidate	Votes	%	±%
Democratic	Rosa DeLauro	137,108	64.87%	+19.61
A Connecticut Party	Rosa DeLauro	13,690	6.48%	+0.22
Total	Rosa DeLauro (inc.)	150,798	71.35%	+7.90
Republican	John Coppola	59,335	28.07%	−2.22
Natural Law	Gail Dalby	1,219	0.58%	+0.58
Total votes		211,352	100%	
Democratic hold				

US House election, 1998: Connecticut District 3
Party	Candidate	Votes	%	±%
Democratic	Rosa DeLauro (inc.)	109,726	71.32%	−0.03
Republican	Martin Reust	42,090	27.36%	−0.71
Term Limits	Kristen Abbatiello	739	0.48%	N/A
Reform	David Cole	676	0.44%	N/A
Natural Law	Gail Dalby	620	0.40%	−0.18
Total votes		153,851	100%	
Democratic hold				

US House election, 2000: Connecticut District 3
Party	Candidate	Votes	%	±%
Democratic	Rosa DeLauro (inc.)	156,910	71.91%	+0.59
Republican	June Gold	60,037	27.51%	+0.15
Natural Law	Gail Dalby	1,258	0.58%	+0.18
Total votes		218,205	100%	
Democratic hold				

US House election, 2002: Connecticut District 3
Party	Candidate	Votes	%	±%
Democratic	Rosa DeLauro (inc.)	121,557	65.58%	−6.33
Republican	Richard Elser	54,757	29.54%	+2.03
Green	Charles Pillsbury	9,050	4.88%	+4.88
Total votes		185,364	100%	
Democratic hold				

Connecticut 3rd Congressional District Election, 2004
Party	Candidate	Votes	%	±%
Democratic	Rosa DeLauro (inc.)	200,638	72.44%	+6.86
Republican	Richard Elser	69,160	24.97%	−4.57
Green	Ralph Ferrucci	7,182	2.59%	−2.29
Total votes		276,980	100%	
Democratic hold				

Connecticut 3rd Congressional District Election, 2006
Party	Candidate	Votes	%	±%
Democratic	Rosa DeLauro (inc.)	150,436	76.01%	+3.57
Republican	Joseph Vollano	44,386	22.43%	−2.54
Green	Daniel Sumrall	3,089	1.56%	−1.03
Total votes		197,911	100%	
Democratic hold				

Connecticut 3rd Congressional District Election, 2008
Party	Candidate	Votes	%	±%
Democratic	Rosa DeLauro	204,761	68.86%	−7.15
Working Families	Rosa DeLauro	25,411	8.55%	+8.55
Total	Rosa DeLauro (inc.)	230,172	77.40%	+1.39
Republican	Bo Itshaky	58,583	19.70%	−2.73
Green	Ralph Ferrucci	8,613	2.90%	+1.34
Total votes		297,368	100%	
Democratic hold				

Connecticut 3rd Congressional District Election, 2010
Party	Candidate	Votes	%	±%
Democratic	Rosa DeLauro	134,544	60.97%	−7.89
Working Families	Rosa DeLauro	9,021	4.09%	−4.46
Total	Rosa DeLauro (inc.)	143,565	65.06%	−12.34
Republican	Jerry Labriola	74,107	33.58%	+13.88
Green	Charles Pillsbury	2,984	1.35%	−1.55
Write-in		5	0.00%	N/A
Total votes		220,661	100%	
Democratic hold				

Connecticut 3rd Congressional District Election, 2012
Party	Candidate	Votes	%	±%
Democratic	Rosa DeLauro	197,163	67.68%	+6.71
Working Families	Rosa DeLauro	20,410	7.01%	+2.92
Total	Rosa DeLauro (inc.)	217,573	74.69%	+9.63
Republican	Wayne Winsley	73,726	25.31%	−8.27
Total votes		291,299	100%	
Democratic hold				

Connecticut 3rd Congressional District Election, 2014
Party	Candidate	Votes	%	±%
Democratic	Rosa DeLauro	130,009	61.93%	−5.75
Working Families	Rosa DeLauro	10,476	4.99%	−2.02
Total	Rosa DeLauro (inc.)	140,485	66.92%	−7.77
Republican	James Brown	69,454	33.08%	+7.77
Total votes		209,939	100%	
Democratic hold				

Connecticut 3rd Congressional District Election, 2016
Party	Candidate	Votes	%	±%
Democratic	Rosa DeLauro	192,274	62.15%	+0.22
Working Families	Rosa DeLauro	21,298	6.88%	+1.89
Total	Rosa DeLauro (inc.)	213,572	69.03%	+2.11
Republican	Angel Cadena	95,786	30.96%	−2.12
Write-in		21	0.01%	N/A
Total votes		309,379	100%	
Democratic hold				

Connecticut 3rd Congressional District Election, 2018
Party	Candidate	Votes	%	±%
Democratic	Rosa DeLauro	163,211	60.40%	−1.75
Working Families	Rosa DeLauro	11,361	4.20%	−2.68
Total	Rosa DeLauro (inc.)	174,572	64.60%	−4.43
Republican	Angel Cadena	95,667	35.40%	+4.44
Total votes		270,239	100%	
Democratic hold				

Connecticut 3rd Congressional District Election, 2020
Party	Candidate	Votes	%	±%
Democratic	Rosa DeLauro	194,259	56.13%	−4.27
Working Families	Rosa DeLauro	9,006	2.60%	−1.60
Total	Rosa DeLauro (inc.)	203,265	58.73%	−5.87
Republican	Margaret Streicker	131,568	38.01%	+2.61
Independent Party	Margaret Streicker	6,030	1.74%	+1.74
Total	Margaret Streicker	137,598	39.76%	N/A
Green	Justin Paglino	5,240	1.51%	+1.51
Total votes		346,103	100%	
Democratic hold				

Connecticut 3rd Congressional District Election, 2022
Party	Candidate	Votes	%	±%
Democratic	Rosa DeLauro (inc.)	137,924	56.84%	−1.89
Republican	Lesley DeNardis	98,704	40.68%	+2.67
Independent Party	Amy Chai	4,056	1.67%	−0.07
Green	Justin Paglino	1,967	0.81%	−0.70
Total votes		242,651	100%	
Democratic hold				

Connecticut 3rd Congressional District Election, 2024
Party	Candidate	Votes	%	±%
Democratic	Rosa DeLauro (inc.)	193,684	58.88%	+2.04
Republican	Michael Massey	130,095	39.55%	−1.13
Independent Party	Michael Massey	5,018	1.53%	−0.14
Total	Michael Massey	135,113	41.08%	N/A
Write-in		126	0.04%	N/A
Total votes		328,923	100%	
Democratic hold				

== See also ==
- Women in the United States House of Representatives

U.S. House of Representatives
Preceded by Bruce Morrison	Member of the U.S. House of Representatives from Connecticut's 3rd congressional district 1991–present	Incumbent
Preceded by Nita Lowey	Chair of the House Appropriations Committee; 2021–2023	Succeeded by Kay Granger
Preceded by Kay Granger	Ranking Member of the House Appropriations Committee; 2023–present	Incumbent
Party political offices
New office	House Democratic Assistant to the Leader; 1999–2003	Succeeded by John Spratt
Preceded by Steny Hoyer	Chair of the House Democratic Steering Committee; 2003–2021	Succeeded by Cheri Bustos
U.S. order of precedence (ceremonial)
Preceded by Richard Neal	United States representatives by seniority 8th	Succeeded by Maxine Waters
Preceded by Richard Neal	Order of precedence of the United States	Succeeded by Maxine Waters
