= George Gunther =

American politician (1919–2012)

George Lackman "Doc" Gunther

Member of the Connecticut State Senate from the 21st district
- In office January 4, 1967 – January 7, 2007
- Preceded by: John J. Relihan
- Succeeded by: Dan Debicella

Personal details
- Born: November 22, 1919 Bridgeport, Connecticut, US
- Died: August 26, 2012 (aged 92) Branford, Connecticut, US
- Resting place: Union Cemetery, Stratford, Connecticut, US
- Party: Republican
- Spouse: Priscilla A Gunther

George Lackman "Doc" Gunther (November 22, 1919 – August 26, 2012) was an American politician. He was the longest-serving state legislator in Connecticut history. Senator Gunther represented the 21st Connecticut Senate District, comprising all of Shelton, most of Stratford, and parts of Monroe and Seymour, Connecticut, from 1966 to 2006. When Gunther retired in 2006, he was replaced by his protégé and former campaign manager, Dan Debicella from Shelton.

Born in Bridgeport, Connecticut, he was a naturopath and had studied in Chicago, Illinois. Gunther first served on the Stratford Board of Education for four years, followed by five years on the Stratford Town Council, before being elected to the state Senate. Although he was the Deputy Minority Leader at Large for the Republican Party in the Connecticut Senate, Gunther had a reputation for following his own mind, particularly in regards to the welfare of Stratford. He was instrumental in Connecticut state government reform activities, including sponsoring formation of the state Property Review Committee to oversee state contracts. Gunther served for almost 20 years on the National Council of State Legislatures, and for more than 15 years on the board of directors of the American Legislative Exchange Council (ALEC).

Gunther had one of the longest and strongest reputations for environmentalism in the Connecticut legislature, stemming back to when the movement was known as conservation. While still on the Stratford Town Council, he sponsored the establishment of the first municipal conservation commission in Connecticut; then in his freshman year as state senator, he co-authored the first law to regulate and restrict activities allowed in tidal wetlands. He has been recognized many times by environmentalist and conservation groups for his opposition to pollution and his work to preserve the environment for hunters, fishermen, and the shell fishing industry. In 1975, he toured the ruins of the burned-out Sponge Rubber Products plant in Shelton with then Connecticut Governor Ella Grasso, which led to the eventual establishment of the property as Riverwalk Park, thirty years later. He served for nearly thirty years on the federal Atlantic States Marine Fisheries Commission, and in 1990 helped form the Housatonic River Estuary Commission to develop the recreational and commercial resources of the lower Housatonic River. He spearheaded opposition to construction of a large natural gas terminal in Long Island Sound, proposed by Broadwater Energy.

His interest in preserving the environment dovetailed with his advocacy of the recreation and tourism industries. He supported the revival of the Shakespeare Festival Theater in Stratford, and aided the purchase of the H.M.S. Rose by Kaye Williams in Bridgeport.

Another of Gunther's passions is Connecticut's aviation history. In 2005, he successfully sponsored a bill naming World War II's F4U Corsair fighter, developed and manufactured in Connecticut, as the state's official aircraft, and organized a Corsair Celebration and Symposium at Sikorsky Memorial Airport in Stratford for Memorial Day, May 29, 2006. Gunther was also instrumental in the state legislature's designation of Igor Sikorsky as a Connecticut Aviation Pioneer, and sponsored a bill supporting Gustav Whitehead's claim to having achieved controlled powered heavier-than-air flight in Bridgeport, two years before the Wright brothers' Kitty Hawk flight. Gunther hopes to see the Connecticut Air & Space Center move to the former Stratford Army Engine Plant, when the U.S. Army terminates ownership of the property.

"Doc" Gunther died at 3am on August 26, 2012, in a hospice facility in Branford, Connecticut.

In 2018 Stratford named a short access road to Long Beach Park in remembrance of Gunther, naming it "George “Doc” Gunther Way". The street is about 400 feet long, extending roughly from a guard shack to the parking lot.

== See also ==
- Connecticut Senate
- Stratford, Connecticut
