= Connecticut's 1st congressional district =

U.S. House district for Connecticut

Coordinates: 41°55′43″N 73°01′03″W

- Interactive map of district boundaries since January 3, 2023
- Representative: John B. Larson; D–East Hartford
- Area: 673 mi^{2} (1,740 km^{2})
- Distribution: 93.94% urban; 6.06% rural
- Population (2025): 726,603
- Median household income: $87,348
- Ethnicity: 57.0% White; 17.8% Hispanic; 14.8% Black; 5.9% Asian; 3.6% Two or more races; 0.8% other
- Cook PVI: D+12

Connecticut's 1st congressional district is a congressional district in the U.S. state of Connecticut. Located in the north-central part of the state, the district is anchored by the state capital of Hartford. It encompasses much of central Connecticut and includes towns within Hartford, Litchfield, and Middlesex counties.

Principal cities include: Bristol, Hartford, and Torrington. The district has been represented by Democrat John B. Larson since 1999.

== Composition ==
For the 118th and successive Congresses (based on redistricting following the 2020 census), Connecticut's 1st district contains portions of four planning regions and 27 municipalities.

Capitol Planning Region (17)

Berlin, Bloomfield, East Granby, East Hartford, East Windsor, Glastonbury (part; also 2nd; includes Glastonbury Center), Granby, Hartford, Manchester, Newington, Rocky Hill, South Windsor, Southington, West Hartford, Wethersfield, Windsor, Windsor Locks

Lower Connecticut River Valley Planning Region (3)

Cromwell, Middletown (part; also 3rd), Portland

Naugatuck Valley Planning Region (1)

Bristol

Northwest Hills Planning Region (6)

Barkhamsted, Colebrook, Hartland, New Hartford, Torrington (part; also 5th), Winchester

=== Voter registration ===
Voter Registration and Party Enrollment as of October 30, 2012
Party	Active Voters	Inactive Voters	Total Voters	Percentage
Democratic	156,784	11,392	168,176	40.39%
Republican	71,932	3,348	75,280	18.08%
Minor Parties	301	29	330	0.07%
Unaffiliated	161,327	11,299	172,626	41.46%
Total	390,334	26,068	416,412	100%

== Recent election results from statewide races ==
Year	Office	Results
2008	President	Obama 66% - 33%
2010	Senate	Blumenthal 60% - 39%
2010	Governor	Malloy 54% - 44%
2012	President	Obama 64% - 36%
2012	Senate	Murphy 61% - 39%
2014	Governor	Malloy 54% - 43%
2016	President	Clinton 59% - 36%
2016	Senate	Blumenthal 68% - 30%
2018	Senate	Murphy 63% - 36%
2018	Governor	Lamont 53% - 41%
2018	Attorney General	Tong 56% - 43%
2020	President	Biden 63% - 35%
2022	Senate	Blumenthal 63% - 37%
2022	Governor	Lamont 61% - 38%
2022	Secretary of the State	Thomas 60% - 37%
2022	Treasurer	Russell 58% - 39%
2022	Comptroller	Scanlon 60% - 40%
2022	Attorney General	Tong 63% - 36%
2024	President	Harris 61% - 38%
2024	Senate	Murphy 62% - 36%

== Recent elections ==
The district has the lowest Republican voter performance of the five Connecticut house seats. It has been in Democratic hands without interruption since 1957, and for all but six years since 1931.

US House election, 1988
Party	Candidate	Votes	%	±%
Democratic	Barbara B. Kennelly (inc.)	176,463	77%	
Republican	Mario Robles, Jr.	51,985	23%	
Democratic hold		Swing		
Turnout		228,448	100%	

US House election, 1990
Party	Candidate	Votes	%	±%
Democratic	Barbara B. Kennelly (inc.)	126,566	71%	
Republican	James P. Garvey	50,690	29%	
Democratic hold		Swing		
Turnout		177,256	100%	

US House election, 1992
Party	Candidate	Votes	%	±%
Democratic	Barbara B. Kennelly (inc.)	164,735	67%	
Republican	Phillip Steele	75,113	31%	
Concerned Citizens	Gary Garneau	5,577	2%	
Democratic hold		Swing		
Turnout		245,425	100%	

US House election, 1994
Party	Candidate	Votes	%	±%
Democratic	Barbara B. Kennelly (inc.)	139,637	74%	
Republican	Douglas T. Putnam	46,865	24%	
Concerned Citizens	John F. Forry, III	3,405	2%	
Democratic hold		Swing		
Turnout		188,907	100%	

US House election, 1996
Party	Candidate	Votes	%	±%
Democratic	Barbara B. Kennelly (inc.)	158,222	74%	
Republican	Kent Sleath	53,666	24%	
Concerned Citizens	John F. Forry, III	2,099	1%	
Natural Law	Daniel A. Wasielewski	1,149	1%	
Democratic hold		Swing		
Turnout		215,136	100%	

US House election, 1998
Party	Candidate	Votes	%	±%
Democratic	John B. Larson	97,681	58%	
Republican	Kevin O'Connor	69,668	41%	
Term Limits	Jay E. Palmieri, IV	915	1%	
Democratic hold		Swing		
Turnout		168,264	100%	

US House election, 2000
Party	Candidate	Votes	%	±%
Democratic	John B. Larson (inc.)	151,932	72%	
Republican	Robert Backlund	59,331	28%	
Democratic hold		Swing		
Turnout		211,263	100%	

US House election, 2002
Party	Candidate	Votes	%	±%
Democratic	John B. Larson (inc.)	134,698	67%	
Republican	Phil Steele	66,968	33%	
Democratic hold		Swing		
Turnout		201,666	100%	

US House election, 2004
Party	Candidate	Votes	%	±%
Democratic	John B. Larson (inc.)	197,964	73%	
Republican	John Halstead	73,272	27%	
Democratic hold		Swing		
Turnout		271,237	100%	

US House election, 2006
Party	Candidate	Votes	%	±%
Democratic	John B. Larson (inc.)	154,539	74%	
Republican	Scott MacLean	53,010	26%	
Democratic hold		Swing		
Turnout		207,549	100%	

US House election, 2008
Party	Candidate	Votes	%	±%
Democratic	John B. Larson (inc.)	211,563	72%	
Republican	Joe Visconti	76,851	26%	
Green	Stephen Fournier	7,199	2%	
Democratic hold		Swing		
Turnout		295,613	100%	

US House election, 2010
Party	Candidate	Votes	%	±%
Democratic	John B. Larson (inc.)	138,440	61%	
Republican	Ann Brickley	84,076	37%	
Green	Kenneth J. Krayeske	2,564	1%	
Socialist Action	Christopher Hutchinson	955	0.42%	
Democratic hold		Swing		
Turnout		226,035	100%	

Connecticut 1st Congressional District Election, 2012
Party	Candidate	Votes	%	±%
Democratic	John B. Larson (inc.)	206,575	70%	
Republican	John Henry Decker	82,262	28%	
Green	Michael DeRosa	5,746	2%	
Democratic hold		Swing		
Turnout		294,583	100%	

Connecticut 1st Congressional District Election, 2014
Party	Candidate	Votes	%	±%
Democratic	John B. Larson (inc.)	135,825	62%	
Republican	Matthew Corey	78,609	36%	
Green	Jeff Russell	3,447	2%	
Democratic hold		Swing		
Turnout		217,881	100%	

Connecticut 1st Congressional District Election, 2016
Party	Candidate	Votes	%	±%
Democratic	John B. Larson (inc.)	188,286	64%	
Republican	Matthew Corey	100,976	34%	
Green	Mike De Rosa	6,031	2%	
Democratic hold		Swing		
Turnout		295,293	100%	

Connecticut 1st Congressional District Election, 2018
Party	Candidate	Votes	%	±%
Democratic	John B. Larson (inc.)	175,087	63%	
Republican	Jennifer Nye	96,024	35%	
Green	Tom McCormick	3,029	1%	
Democratic hold		Swing		
Turnout		274,140	100%	

Connecticut 1st Congressional District Election, 2020
Party	Candidate	Votes	%
Democratic	John B. Larson (inc.)	222,668	64%
Republican	Mary Fay	122,111	35%
Green	Tom McCormick	4,458	1%
Total votes		349,237	100%
Democratic hold			

Connecticut 1st Congressional District Election, 2022
Party	Candidate	Votes	%
Democratic	John Larson (inc.)	149,556	61%
Republican	Larry Lazor	91,506	37%
Green	Mary Sanders	2,851	1%
Total votes		243,913	100%
Democratic hold			

Connecticut 1st Congressional District Election, 2024
Party	Candidate	Votes	%
Democratic	John Larson (inc.)	208,649	63.1%
Republican	Jim Griffin	115,065	34.8%
Green	Mary Sanders	6,768	2%
Total votes		330,482	100%
Democratic hold			

== List of members representing the district ==
Member	Party	Years	Cong ress	Electoral history	Location
District created March 4, 1837
Isaac Toucey (Hartford)	Democratic	March 4, 1837 – March 3, 1839	25th	Redistricted from the at-large district and re-elected in 1837. Lost re-election.	
Joseph Trumbull (Hartford)	Whig	March 4, 1839 – March 3, 1843	26th 27th	Elected in 1839. Re-elected in 1840. Retired.	
Thomas H. Seymour (Hartford)	Democratic	March 4, 1843 – March 3, 1845	28th	Elected in 1843. Retired.	
James Dixon (Hartford)	Whig	March 4, 1845 – March 3, 1849	29th 30th	Elected in 1845. Re-elected in 1847. Retired.	
Loren P. Waldo (Tolland)	Democratic	March 4, 1849 – March 3, 1851	31st	Elected in 1849. Lost re-election.	
Charles Chapman (Hartford)	Whig	March 4, 1851 – March 3, 1853	32nd	Elected in 1851. Retired to run for Governor.	
James T. Pratt (Rocky Hill)	Democratic	March 4, 1853 – March 3, 1855	33rd	Elected in 1853. Lost re-election.	
Ezra Clark Jr. (Hartford)	American	March 4, 1855 – March 3, 1857	34th 35th	Elected in 1855. Re-elected in 1857. Lost re-election.	
Ezra Clark Jr. (Hartford)	Republican	March 4, 1857 – March 3, 1859	34th 35th	Elected in 1855. Re-elected in 1857. Lost re-election.	
Dwight Loomis (Rockville)	Republican	March 4, 1859 – March 3, 1863	36th 37th	Elected in 1859. Re-elected in 1861. Retired.	
Henry C. Deming (Hartford)	Republican	March 4, 1863 – March 3, 1867	38th 39th	Elected in 1863. Re-elected in 1865. Lost re-election.	
Richard D. Hubbard (Hartford)	Democratic	March 4, 1867 – March 3, 1869	40th	Elected in 1867. Retired.	
Julius L. Strong (Hartford)	Republican	March 4, 1869 – September 7, 1872	41st 42nd	Elected in 1869. Re-elected in 1871. Died.	
Vacant		September 7, 1872 – December 2, 1872	42nd		
Joseph Roswell Hawley (Hartford)	Republican	December 2, 1872 – March 3, 1875	42nd 43rd	Elected to finish Strong's term. Re-elected in 1873. Lost re-election.	
George M. Landers (New Britain)	Democratic	March 4, 1875 – March 3, 1879	44th 45th	Elected in 1875. Re-elected in 1876. Retired.	
Joseph Roswell Hawley (Hartford)	Republican	March 4, 1879 – March 3, 1881	46th	Elected in 1878. Retired when elected U.S. Senator.	
John R. Buck (Hartford)	Republican	March 4, 1881 – March 3, 1883	47th	Elected in 1880. Lost re-election.	
William W. Eaton (Hartford)	Democratic	March 4, 1883 – March 3, 1885	48th	Elected in 1882. Lost re-election.	
John R. Buck (Hartford)	Republican	March 4, 1885 – March 3, 1887	49th	Elected in 1884. Lost re-election.	
Robert J. Vance (New Britain)	Democratic	March 4, 1887 – March 3, 1889	50th	Elected in 1886. Lost re-election.	
William E. Simonds (Canton)	Republican	March 4, 1889 – March 3, 1891	51st	Elected in 1888. Lost re-election.	
Lewis Sperry (Hartford)	Democratic	March 4, 1891 – March 3, 1895	52nd 53rd	Elected in 1890. Re-elected in 1892. Lost re-election.	
E. Stevens Henry (Rockville)	Republican	March 4, 1895 – March 3, 1913	54th 55th 56th 57th 58th 59th 60th 61st 62nd	Elected in 1894. Re-elected in 1896. Re-elected in 1898. Re-elected in 1900. Re-elected in 1902. Re-elected in 1904. Re-elected in 1906. Re-elected in 1908. Re-elected in 1910. Retired.	
Augustine Lonergan (Hartford)	Democratic	March 4, 1913 – March 3, 1915	63rd	Elected in 1912. Lost re-election.	
P. Davis Oakey (Hartford)	Republican	March 4, 1915 – March 3, 1917	64th	Elected in 1914. Lost re-election.	
Augustine Lonergan (Hartford)	Democratic	March 4, 1917 – March 3, 1921	65th 66th	Elected in 1916. Re-elected in 1918. Retired to run for U.S. Senate.	
E. Hart Fenn (Wethersfield)	Republican	March 4, 1921 – March 3, 1931	67th 68th 69th 70th 71st	Elected in 1920. Re-elected in 1922. Re-elected in 1924. Re-elected in 1926. Re-elected in 1928. Retired.	
Augustine Lonergan (Hartford)	Democratic	March 4, 1931 – March 3, 1933	72nd	Elected in 1930. Retired to run for U.S. Senate.	
Herman P. Kopplemann (Hartford)	Democratic	March 4, 1933 – January 3, 1939	73rd 74th 75th	Elected in 1932. Re-elected in 1934. Re-elected in 1936. Lost re-election.	
William J. Miller (Wethersfield)	Republican	January 3, 1939 – January 3, 1941	76th	Elected in 1938. Lost re-election.	
Herman P. Kopplemann (Hartford)	Democratic	January 3, 1941 – January 3, 1943	77th	Elected in 1940. Lost re-election.	
William J. Miller (Wethersfield)	Republican	January 3, 1943 – January 3, 1945	78th	Elected in 1942. Lost re-election.	
Herman P. Kopplemann (Hartford)	Democratic	January 3, 1945 – January 3, 1947	79th	Elected in 1944. Lost re-election.	
William J. Miller (Wethersfield)	Republican	January 3, 1947 – January 3, 1949	80th	Elected in 1946. Lost re-election.	
Abraham Ribicoff (Hartford)	Democratic	January 3, 1949 – January 3, 1953	81st 82nd	Elected in 1948. Re-elected in 1950. Retired to run for U.S. Senator.	
Thomas J. Dodd (West Hartford)	Democratic	January 3, 1953 – January 3, 1957	83rd 84th	Elected in 1952. Re-elected in 1954. Retired to run for U.S. Senator.	
Edwin H. May Jr. (Wethersfield)	Republican	January 3, 1957 – January 3, 1959	85th	Elected in 1956. Lost re-election.	
Emilio Q. Daddario (Hartford)	Democratic	January 3, 1959 – January 3, 1971	86th 87th 88th 89th 90th 91st	Elected in 1958. Re-elected in 1960. Re-elected in 1962. Re-elected in 1964. Re-elected in 1966. Re-elected in 1968. Retired to run for Governor.	
William R. Cotter (Hartford)	Democratic	January 3, 1971 – September 8, 1981	92nd 93rd 94th 95th 96th 97th	Elected in 1970. Re-elected in 1972. Re-elected in 1974. Re-elected in 1976. Re-elected in 1978. Re-elected in 1980. Died.	
Vacant		September 9, 1981 – January 11, 1982	97th		
Barbara B. Kennelly (Hartford)	Democratic	January 12, 1982 – January 3, 1999	97th 98th 99th 100th 101st 102nd 103rd 104th 105th	Elected to finish Cotter's term. Re-elected in 1982. Re-elected in 1984. Re-elected in 1986. Re-elected in 1988. Re-elected in 1990. Re-elected in 1992. Re-elected in 1994. Re-elected in 1996. Retired to run for Governor.	
John B. Larson (East Hartford)	Democratic	January 3, 1999 – present	106th 107th 108th 109th 110th 111th 112th 113th 114th 115th 116th 117th 118th 119th	Elected in 1998. Re-elected in 2000. Re-elected in 2002. Re-elected in 2004. Re-elected in 2006. Re-elected in 2008. Re-elected in 2010. Re-elected in 2012. Re-elected in 2014. Re-elected in 2016. Re-elected in 2018. Re-elected in 2020. Re-elected in 2022. Re-elected in 2024. Lost renomination.	
John B. Larson (East Hartford)	Democratic	January 3, 1999 – present	106th 107th 108th 109th 110th 111th 112th 113th 114th 115th 116th 117th 118th 119th	Elected in 1998. Re-elected in 2000. Re-elected in 2002. Re-elected in 2004. Re-elected in 2006. Re-elected in 2008. Re-elected in 2010. Re-elected in 2012. Re-elected in 2014. Re-elected in 2016. Re-elected in 2018. Re-elected in 2020. Re-elected in 2022. Re-elected in 2024. Lost renomination.	2003–2013
John B. Larson (East Hartford)	Democratic	January 3, 1999 – present	106th 107th 108th 109th 110th 111th 112th 113th 114th 115th 116th 117th 118th 119th	Elected in 1998. Re-elected in 2000. Re-elected in 2002. Re-elected in 2004. Re-elected in 2006. Re-elected in 2008. Re-elected in 2010. Re-elected in 2012. Re-elected in 2014. Re-elected in 2016. Re-elected in 2018. Re-elected in 2020. Re-elected in 2022. Re-elected in 2024. Lost renomination.	2013–2023
John B. Larson (East Hartford)	Democratic	January 3, 1999 – present	106th 107th 108th 109th 110th 111th 112th 113th 114th 115th 116th 117th 118th 119th	Elected in 1998. Re-elected in 2000. Re-elected in 2002. Re-elected in 2004. Re-elected in 2006. Re-elected in 2008. Re-elected in 2010. Re-elected in 2012. Re-elected in 2014. Re-elected in 2016. Re-elected in 2018. Re-elected in 2020. Re-elected in 2022. Re-elected in 2024. Lost renomination.	2023–present
Luke Bronin (Hartford)	Democratic	Assuming office on January 3, 2027		Elected in 2026.	2023–present
