= Wayne Winsley =

American motivational speaker, author, and broadcaster

Wayne Winsley (born August 13, 1963, in Cleveland, Ohio) is an American motivational speaker, author, and broadcaster. He is the founder and executive director of Brave Enough To Fail Inc. a student motivational program. He was the morning news host for WSTC and WNLK in Norwalk, Stamford, and Connecticut, and the afternoon drive news anchor for WICC 600AM in Bridgeport in Fairfield County, Connecticut.

== Early life and education ==
Winsley was raised by his great-grandmother. In 1979, he moved to Stamford, Connecticut, where he lived with his mother and three other siblings. He graduated from Westhill High School in Stamford in 1982. On October 29, 2011, Winsley announced his intention to be the Republican candidate for Congress in 2012 in Connecticut's Third Congressional District. He lost to 11-term incumbent Democrat Rosa DeLauro in the general election.

== Career ==
Winsley served in the U.S. Navy and made two Western Pacific tours aboard the carrier USS Enterprise as a member of Viking Squadron 21 out of Naval Air Station North Island.

In 1989 Winsley worked as a part-time DJ at WRKI I95-FM in Danbury after submitting a demo tape to the radio station. He went from playing rock & roll on the weekends to holding a full-time shift, writing and producing commercials. Winsley was also a radio personality and news caster on WICC 600 AM, and WEBE 108 FM in Bridgeport, Connecticut.

In 1992, Winsley appeared on an episode of A&E's Comedy on the Road. Winsley then went on to produce comedy shows of his own at venues throughout Connecticut.

Winsley was the host of his own issues-oriented talk show, The Wayne Winsley Program, on WINE 940AM and WPUT 1510AM in the Danbury, Connecticut, and Brewster, New York, areas. He was known to listeners as "The Conservative Capitalist".

Wayne moved from the talk studio to the newsroom at WICC 600AM. He went from afternoon news anchor and reporter to host of the morning news show at WSTC-WNLK in the Norwalk and Stamford market.

In 2005, Winsley published his first novel, The Leprechaun Deception, a crime thriller. Since then he has written two sequels: Duplicity and Delusion.
