= Michael John Williams =

American professor, author and political candidate

Michael John "Mike" Williams (born 14 September 1979) is an international relations scholar, former advisor for the Department of State, and former congressional candidate for the 5th District of Connecticut. Williams is the author of numerous books focusing on foreign affairs. In 2006 he was elected a 'Young-Leader' by the Atlantic Bridge (Atlantik-Bruecke) foundation dedicated to developing US-European relations.

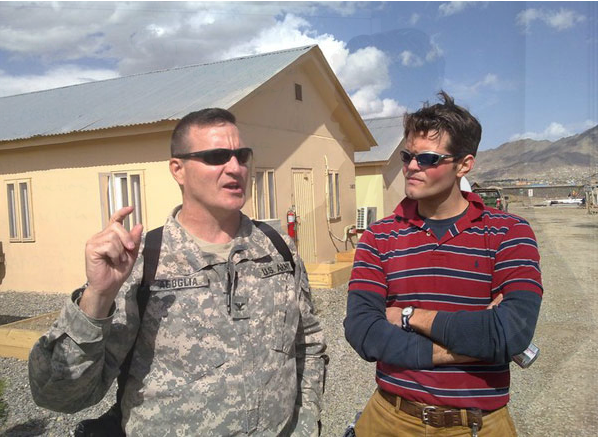
Mike Williams with Colonel John Agoglia in Afghanistan

== Personal life ==
Born in New Haven, Connecticut, Williams completed an Honors B.A. with Distinction at the University of Delaware before earning an M.A. in European Studies with Distinction awarded jointly by the University of Bath, United Kingdom, and Humboldt University in Berlin, Germany. He also gained a Ph.D. from the London School of Economics. At the London School of Economics, he was editor-in-chief of Millennium an international studies journal managed by graduate students. Williams and his co-editor, Felix Berenskoetter, published a special issue on power in world politics that was subsequently released as an edited book of the same name that has become a foundation text on power in the field of international relations. He wrote his Ph.D. with Professor Christopher Coker. Coker, one of the most individual strategic thinkers in the field, is believed to be a major influence on Williams' writings on international relations and security. Coker references Williams' work in several of his books and acknowledges Williams' intellectual contribution in his book 'War in an Age of Risk' (Polity, 2009).

== Work ==
After completing his Ph.D., Williams focused his career on strategic aspects of international relations. In 2008, he was appointed Lecturer in International Relations at Royal Holloway, University of London. Between 2008 and 2010, Williams was a member of the Research Partnership on Post-War State Building, working on solutions to foster sustainable government and security in places such as the Balkans, Iraq and Afghanistan. Prior to this Williams created and developed the RUSI project examining civil-military integration in conflict and post-conflict zones. During his time at RUSI Williams advised the U.S. State Department, NATO, the U. S. Department of Defense as well as allies such as Canada and Great Britain. His work focused on strengthening diplomatic ties and advocating for policies to enhance the protection and welfare of American and allied soldiers. For his service to military science studies, Williams was elected a Fellow of the Inter-University Seminar on the Armed Forces & Society at Loyola University Chicago. Prior to working at Wesleyan during a period of sabbatical away from his regular post at Royal Holloway, University of London, Williams was a visiting fellow at the University of Oxford, and the head of the Transatlantic Security Program at the Royal United Services Institute for Defence Studies. While at RUSI Williams conceived, organized and hosted the first "Global Leadership Forum" in conjunction with Newsweek International, the Princeton Project on National Security and Berwin, Leighton, Paisner.

Williams has lectured widely on political-military affairs at leading global education institutions including the NATO Defense College in Rome, the Royal Danish Defense Academy, the Royal Military Academy Sandhurst, Oxford University, Cambridge University, the British Royal Defense Academy and Georgetown University.

Williams is also a prolific commentator on international affairs having appeared on a number of international news shows and in numerous international publications. He was a regular panelist for CNN's Connect the World with Becky Anderson during his time in London. He is a regular contributor to the British newspaper The Guardian and The Guardian's blog Comment is Free as well as the more US-oriented blog Comment is Free America. Most recently Williams has been a contributed to MSNBC appearing on Dylan Ratigan's afternoon news show to comment on US domestic politics and international affairs. Williams' first appeared on MSNBC for an interview with Thomas Roberts to discuss civil-rights while campaigning for Congress.

Williams has published three academic books on international relations; 'NATO, Security and Risk Management: From Kosovo to Kandahar', "The Good War: NATO and the Liberal Conscience in Afghanistan" and the edited book "Power in World Politics". He publishes academically under the name M. J. Williams and has published several academic and policy articles on foreign affairs.

== Political work and campaign ==
Williams worked on public policy as an intern in the office of Senator Joseph Biden. He credits Biden in his motivation to pursue graduate studies abroad and to bring the knowledge he gained overseas back to help advance the American national interest.

Ahead of his sabbatical year from Royal Holloway, University of London in 2011–12, Williams announced in Spring of 2011 his candidacy for the 5th District Congressional seat that was to be vacated by Chris Murphy in 2012. On October 30 Williams withdrew his run for the 5th district seat citing fund raising as the main cause for the withdrawal.
