= Connecticut Working Families Party =

Minor political party

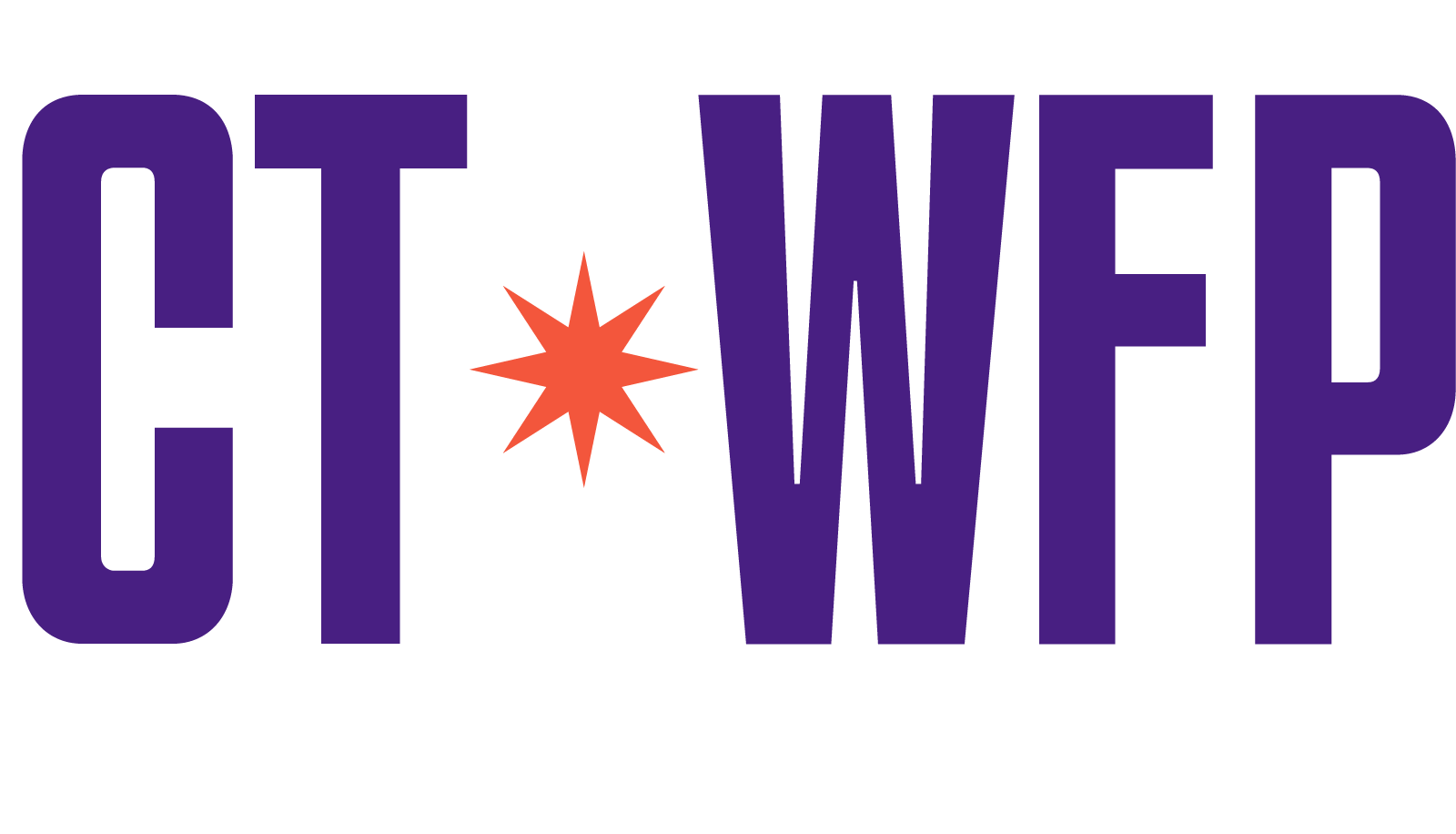
- Headquarters: 30 Arbor Street, Hartford, CT 06106
- Registered voters (2022): 304
- Ideology: Social democracy; Progressivism; Democratic socialism
- Political position: Center-left to left-wing
- State House: 0 / 151
- State Senate: 0 / 36
- Statewide Executive Offices: 0 / 6
- U.S. House of Representatives: 0 / 5
- U.S. Senate: 0 / 2
- Hartford City Council: 2 / 9

Website
- workingfamilies.org/connecticut/

The Connecticut Working Families Party is a political party in the U.S. state of Connecticut with approximately 300 members. It is an affiliate of the national Working Families Party. The party's support has been strongest in Hartford and Bridgeport and has been credited with helping ensure the election of Democrat Dannel Malloy in the 2010 gubernatorial election. The party primarily endorses like-minded Democrats but has run candidates against Democrats on the Working Families Party ballot line.

== History ==
The Connecticut Working Families Party was formed in 2002, by organizations that included Association of Community Organizations for Reform Now, American Federation of State, County and Municipal Employees, Communications Workers of America, and United Food and Commercial Workers.

In 2007, Wildaliz Bermudez and Larry Deutsch were elected to the city council in Hartford, Connecticut. The number of votes Dannel Malloy received on the Working Families' ballot line was greater than his margin of victory in the 2010 gubernatorial election.

In a February 2015 special election, Ed Gomes was elected to the Connecticut State Senate using the WFP as his only ballot line, becoming the first Connecticut WFP member to do so.

In 2017, Joshua M. Hall, running in an April 2017 special election for the Connecticut House of Representatives, became the second candidate in the nation to win a state legislative office running solely as a nominee for the Working Families Party.

== Works cited ==
- Sekou, Bilal (2020). Beyond Donkeys and Elephants: Minor Political Parties in Contemporary American Politics. University Press of Kansas. doi:10.2307/j.ctv15tt76n. ISBN 978-0-7006-2929-9.
