= Dan Debicella =

American politician

Member of the Connecticut State Senate from the 21st district
- In office January 7, 2007 – January 5, 2011
- Preceded by: George Gunther
- Succeeded by: Kevin C. Kelly
- Constituency: Shelton, Stratford (part), Monroe (part), Seymour (part)

Personal details
- Born: October 24, 1974 (age 51) Bridgeport, Connecticut, U.S.
- Party: Republican
- Spouse: Alexandra Galli
- Education: University of Pennsylvania (BS); Harvard University (MBA)
- Website: http://www.debicella.com

Dan Debicella is an American businessman and former Republican politician who served in the Connecticut State Senate representing the 21st district from 2007 to 2011 during the term of Governor Jodi Rell. As a state senator, he focused on fiscal conservatism and local economic issues in Fairfield County. Debicella ran unsuccessfully for the U.S. House of Representatives in Connecticut's 4th congressional district in both 2010 and 2014, challenging incumbent Democrat Jim Himes. Debicella positioned himself as a “Main Street Republican” advocating for practical issues like job growth and transportation improvements, while supporting more moderate social policies like support of gay marriage and over-the-counter access to birth control. In his private sector career, he has held executive roles in CPG and retail, currently serving as Chief Transformation Officer at Novolex.

== Early life ==
Debicella was born in Bridgeport, Connecticut, and spent his early years in that city before moving to nearby Shelton. His father, Charles "Cal" Debicella, worked as a policeman for the Bridgeport Police Department, embodying public service in a high-crime urban setting. His mother, Maggie Debicella, served as a secretary in the federal judicial system, contributing to family stability through administrative role s in government.

== Academic and Business Career ==
Debicella earned a Bachelor of Science degree in finance from the Wharton School of the University of Pennsylvania in 1996, graduating magna cum laude. He later received a Master of Business Administration from Harvard Business School, where he ranked in the top 5 percent of his class.

These credentials positioned him for roles in high-level finance and management, reflecting a focus on quantitative and strategic business training. Following his MBA, Debicella worked at the consultancy McKinsey & Co. and in strategy roles at PepsiCo. He advanced to a management position at Bridgewater Associates, the world's largest hedge fund by assets under management, based in Westport, Connecticut. These early professional experiences emphasized practical application of financial analysis and business development in competitive sectors.

His primary entrepreneurial venture prior to politics was ownership of Textbooks Online, a company providing digital and physical textbook services to students and educational institutions, which he founded to address inefficiencies in the college textbook market.

After his unsuccessful bid for the U.S. House of Representatives in Connecticut's 4th Congressional District in November 2014, Debicella returned to the business sector, focusing on operational and strategic leadership roles. He served as Chief Transformation Officer at Young’s Market Company, an alcohol distributor and at Serta Simmons, a mattress manufacturer. He assumed executive positions at SGS & Co, a multinational firm specializing in brand development, packaging, and graphics solutions headquartered in Louisville, Kentucky. Debicella served as Chief Transformation Officer, then being promoted to Chief Operating Officer and eventually President of the Graphics Services business. In 2026 he started as Chief Transformation Officer at Novolex, a $10 billion packaging manufacturer serving CPG, retail, and restaurant companies.

== Connecticut State Senate ==
Debicella started his political career locally as Chairman of Shelton’s Board of Apportionment and Taxation. He decided to run for the Connecticut State Senate's 21st district in 2006 after the longest-serving state legislator in the state's history, Doc Gunther, decided to retire. In 2006 he won the 21st State Senate seat by defeating Democratic challenger Christopher Jones, receiving 16,476 votes (52%) to Jones's 15,099 votes (48%). He focused early legislative efforts on fiscal conservatism and local economic issues, drawing from his business experience. Debicella would serve four years in the Connecticut State Senate, representing the 21st district—including Shelton, Stratford, Monroe, and Seymour—from 2007 to 2011. He was re-elected in 2008, defeating Democrat Janice Andersen with 54% of the vote. He ascended to the role of Deputy Minority Leader by 2009.

In the State Senate, Debicella focused largely on fiscal and economy issues, serving as the ranking member of the powerful Appropriations Committee and on the Commerce Committee. He co-authored a “no tax increase” budget in 2008 at the height of the Great Recession that went on to pass with bipartisan support. He authored tax credits for small businesses to create jobs, and passed an environmental bill to prohibit the storage of toxic waste in residential neighborhoods. He also supported increased penalties for crimes involving home invasions.

His positions aligned with moderate Republican priorities, including lowering taxes, support for education reforms, health care access improvements, and economic policies favoring small businesses in his Naugatuck Valley district.

Debicella did not seek re-election in 2010, instead launching a congressional campaign.

== U.S. Congressional elections 2010 & 2014 ==
Debicella ran for U.S. House of Representatives in Connecticut's 4th congressional district in 2010, challenging one-term Democratic incumbent Jim Himes. As the Republican-endorsed candidate and state senator from Shelton, he positioned his campaign on themes of fiscal conservatism and criticism of federal spending. In the Republican primary on August 10, 2010, Debicella defeated several rivals, capturing 60% of the vote.

The race was considered competitive nationally. The race made CNN's Top 100 Most Competitive Races list, Politico’s Daily 10 (a tracker of the closest House Races), and Real Clear Politics' list of "toss up" races. President Barack Obama would come into Bridgeport both in 2010 and 2014 the week before election day to campaign for Himes.

Debicella ran as a “Main Street Republican”, with traditional Republican views on economics and foreign policy but more moderate social issues – aligned with traditional New England Republican philosophy. He also put an emphasis on bipartisan problem solving based on his experience in divided government as a State Senator.

Debicella positioned himself as a critic of expansive federal spending, decrying the 2009 American Recovery and Reinvestment Act for prioritizing "government bureaucrats" over private-sector recovery and failing to deliver sustained economic stimulus. He advocated extending the 2001 and 2003 Bush tax cuts permanently but insisted on offsetting revenue losses through equivalent spending reductions, rejecting deficit-financed extensions. Debicella proposed a federal spending cap to enforce fiscal discipline, arguing it would prevent unchecked growth in government outlays and promote long-term budgetary balance. On labor market policies, he expressed conditional support for minimum wage increases, provided they were bundled with tax incentives for employers to mitigate job losses and encourage hiring. These stances aligned with broader Republican priorities of tax relief paired with expenditure restraint, though critics, including Himes, portrayed them as insufficiently addressing revenue shortfalls in high-cost districts. His 2014 rematch echoed similar themes, focusing on curbing federal overreach to foster private enterprise.

Debicella has expressed support for abortion rights, aligning with a pro-choice position that distinguishes him from more conservative national Republican stances but fits within Connecticut's moderate GOP tradition. He has similarly advocated for marriage equality, endorsing legal recognition of same-sex unions as part of his broader liberal-leaning approach to personal freedoms on social matters. On Second Amendment issues, Debicella affirms the right of Americans to own firearms while favoring targeted restrictions, stating, "I believe in every American’s right to own a gun," alongside support for "common sense gun control to keep guns out of the hands of criminals and those with mental illness," including expanded FBI background checks for buyers. In education policy, Debicella has championed reforms emphasizing innovation and parental options, praising charter schools for delivering "much needed innovation" and calling for their expansion to improve outcomes in urban districts.

He advocated for bipartisanship and compromise, describing himself as a "practical problem solver" who views negotiation not as weakness but as necessary for effective policymaking, while decrying the "corrupting influence" of special-interest donors on legislation. These positions reflect his emphasis on reducing gridlock and prioritizing results over ideological posturing in both state and federal contexts.

Himes won the general election on November 2, 2010, securing 53% of the vote to Debicella's 47% in a district encompassing Fairfield County suburbs. Himes was able to win overwhelmingly in the cities of Bridgeport, Stamford, and Norwalk (where Himes won 67-33%) while limiting Debicella’s lead in the 14 other suburbs (where Debicella won 55-45%) It would be the closest any opponent has come to defeating Himes, and was the closest federal race in Connecticut for the next decade.

The 2010 race is extensively documented in the book “Connecticut's Fourth Congressional District: History, Politics, and the Maverick Tradition” by Professor Gary Rose.

Debicella ran again for the Fourth Congressional District in 2014, emphasizing his business background and moderate Republican stance to appeal to independent voters in the competitive district. The race broadly followed the same issues and positions as the 2010 race—and with almost the exact same results. Himes once again prevailed on November 4, 2014, receiving 106,873 votes (53%) to Debicella's 91,922 votes (47%) out of 198,795 total votes cast.

=== Electoral Analysis ===
Debicella's State Senate elections in Connecticut's 21st District demonstrated consistent Republican performance in a competitive area spanning Shelton, Stratford, Monroe, and Seymour. In 2006, he defeated Democrat Christopher Jones with 53% of the vote (16,476 votes to 15,045), securing a narrow 4 percentage point margin amid a national Democratic wave year. His 2008 re-election against Janice Andersen yielded 54% (24,925 votes to 21,303), a solid victory despite Barack Obama's statewide landslide, reflecting localized GOP strength driven by Debicella's focus on fiscal restraint and local economic concerns. Debicella’s strength in these Democratic leaning years demonstrated a strength in local campaigning.

Debicella’s congressional elections also represent the decline of the moderate wing of New England Republicans. Connecticut went from having a divided congressional delegation in the 1990’s (3Rs, 3Ds) to becoming entirely Democratic by 2008. Since then, no Republican has been elected to federal office in Connecticut. Overall, Debicella's congressional bids achieved near-maximal GOP shares in a D+5 district (per Cook PVI metrics post-2010), but highlighted structural challenges for Republicans in Connecticut's suburban enclaves, where college-educated independent voters drifted more into the Democratic column. The Fourth Congressional District moved from a fifty year Republican held seat to a D+13 in Cook PVI – the most Democratic district in Connecticut.
