= List of members of the American Legislative Exchange Council =

The American Legislative Exchange Council, otherwise known by the acronym ALEC, is a non-profit 501(c) political organization established in 1973 in Chicago. The legislative members are state and federal legislators. It is a forum to allow the members to write model laws and discuss legislative language with other members. ALEC meetings are an opportunity for the corporate and non-profit leaders to meet and provide feedback to legislators. Member legislators can then use these model bills as templates for their own bills.

ALEC's vision statement is "A nonpartisan membership association for conservative state lawmakers who shared a common belief in limited government, free markets, federalism, and individual liberty. Their vision and initiative resulted in the creation of a voluntary membership association for people who believed that government closest to the people was fundamentally more effective, more just, and a better guarantor of freedom than the distant, bloated federal government in Washington, D.C."

ALEC keeps its membership, activities and communications confidential. This list includes members whose identity primarily has become known through internal documents revealed to Common Cause and by research by members of the press.

== Board of Scholars ==
The ALEC Board of Scholars is composed of the following:

- Arthur Laffer, founder and chairman of Laffer Associates, an economic research and consulting firm
- Victor Schwartz, partner in the Washington office of the Kansas City-based law firm Shook, Hardy & Bacon, LLP, and chair of its Public Policy Group.
- Richard Vedder, Distinguished Professor of Economics at Ohio University in Athens, Ohio
- Bob Williams, founder and senior fellow of the Freedom Foundation (Washington), a public policy organization in Olympia, Washington.

== Board of directors ==
As of March 2026, the ALEC board of directors is composed of the following:

Name	Party affiliation	State
ALEC National Chair
State Rep. Demi Busatta	Republican	Florida
Board Members
State Sen. Jim Dotson, Vice Chair	Republican	Arkansas
State Sen. Julie Daniels, Treasurer	Republican	Oklahoma
Speaker Matt Hall, Secretary	Republican	Michigan
State Sen. Patricia Rucker	Republican	West Virginia
State Sen. Ty Masterson	Republican	Kansas
Speaker Daniel A. Perez	Republican	Florida
State Sen. Stuart Adams	Republican	Utah
State Sen. Jim Buck	Republican	Indiana
State Sen. Phil King	Republican	Texas
State Rep. John Carson	Republican	Georgia
State Rep. Chris Croft	Republican	Kansas
State Sen. Josh Harkins	Republican	Mississippi
State Rep. Caroline Harris Davila	Republican	Texas
State Sen. Dan Laursen	Republican	Wyoming
State Rep. Susan Lynn	Republican	Tennessee
State Sen. Rob McColley	Republican	Ohio
State Rep. Kim Moser	Republican	Oklahoma
State Sen. T. J. Shope	Republican	Arizona
State Asm. Robert Smullen	Republican	New York
State Rep. John Wills	Republican	Iowa

=== Board in 2013 ===
The ALEC board of directors is composed of the following:

Name	Party affiliation	State
2013 ALEC National Chair
State Rep. John Piscopo	Republican	Connecticut
First Vice Chair
State Rep. Linda Upmeyer	Republican	Iowa
Second Vice Chair
State Rep. Phil King	Republican	Texas
Treasurer
State Sen. Leah Vukmir	Republican	Wisconsin
Secretary
State Rep. Liston Barfield	Republican	South Carolina
Chairs Emeritus
State Rep. Harold Brubaker	Republican	North Carolina
State Rep. Tom Craddick	Republican	Texas
State Rep. Noble Ellington	Republican	Louisiana
State Sen. Steve Faris	Democratic	Arkansas
State Rep. Bobby Hogue	Democratic	Arkansas
State Sen. Owen H. Johnson	Republican	New York
State Rep. Dolores Mertz	Democratic	Iowa
Immediate Past Chair
State Rep. David Frizzell	Republican	Indiana

Name	Party affiliation	State
Board Members
State Sen. Gary Banz	Republican	Oklahoma
State Sen. Jim Buck	Republican	Indiana
State Sen. Bill Cadman	Republican	Colorado
State Sen. Barbara Cegavske	Republican	Nevada
State Rep. Joe Harrison	Republican	Louisiana
Speaker William J. Howell	Republican	Virginia
State Sen. Michael Lamoureux	Republican	Arkansas
State Rep. Steve McDaniel	Republican	Tennessee
Speaker Raymond Merrick	Republican	Kansas
State Rep. Tim Moffitt	Republican	North Carolina
State Sen. Wayne Neiderhauser	Republican	Utah
State Sen. Bill Seitz	Republican	Ohio
State Rep. Blair Thoreson	Republican	North Dakota
Speaker Thom Tillis	Republican	North Carolina
State Rep. Curry Todd	Republican	Tennessee
State Sen. Susan Wagle	Republican	Kansas

== Private enterprise board ==
The ALEC private enterprise board is composed of the following corporate leaders:

Person	Company	Title	Sector	Status
William Carmichael	American Bail Coalition	Vice Chair	Bail Bonds	Active
John Del Giorno	GlaxoSmithKline	Vice Chairman	Pharmaceutical	Active
David Powers	Reynolds American	Treasurer	Tobacco	Active
Lisa A. Sano Blocker	Energy Future Holdings	Board Member	Energy/Oil	Active
Jeffrey Bond	PhRMA	Board Member	Pharmaceutical	Active
Robert Jones	Pfizer Inc.	Board Member	Pharmaceutical	Active
Kenneth Lane	Diageo	Board Member	Alcoholic Beverages	Active
Pat Thomas	United Parcel Service	Board Member	Shipping	Active
Kelly Mader	Peabody Energy	Board Member	Energy/Oil	Active
Mike Morgan	Koch Companies Public Sector, LLC	Board Member	Timber/Oil/Chemicals	Active
Daniel Smith	Altria	Board Member	Tobacco	Active
Cynthia Bergman	ExxonMobil	Board Member	Energy/Oil	Active
Roland Spies	State Farm Insurance	Board Member	Insurance	Active

== State chairs ==
ALEC state chairs from state legislatures are:

State	Leaders (Party)
Alabama	Terri Collins (R)
Alabama	Greg Reed (R)
Alaska	Wes Keller (R)
Arizona	Debbie Lesko (R)
Arkansas	Eddie Joe Williams (R)
Arkansas	Nate Bell (R)
California	Joel Anderson (R)
Colorado	Bill Cadman (R)
Colorado	Lori Saine (R)
Connecticut	Whit Betts (R)
Delaware	Colin Bonini (R)
Florida	John Wood (R)
Florida	Kelli Stargel (R)
Georgia	Bruce Williamson (R)
Georgia	Judson Hill (R)
Hawaii	Gene Ward (R)
Idaho	Jeff Thompson (R)
Idaho	Steve Vick (R)
Idaho	Jim Patrick (R)
Illinois	David Reis (R)
Indiana	Jim Buck (R)
Indiana	David Wolkins (R)
Iowa	Charles Schneider (R)
Iowa	Rob Taylor (R)
Kansas	Raymond Merrick (R)
Kentucky	Tom Buford (R)
Kentucky	Jim DeCesare (R)
Louisiana	Ray Garofalo (R)

State	Leaders (Party)
Maine	Andre Cushing III (R)
Maryland	Susan W. Krebs (R)
Maryland	Christopher Shank (R)
Massachusetts	Vacant
Michigan	Mike Green (R)
Michigan	Aric Nesbitt (R)
Minnesota	Mary Kiffmeyer R
Mississippi	Jim Ellington R
Missouri	Tim Jones R
Missouri	Jason T. Smith R
Montana	Gary MacLaren R
Montana	Scott Reichner R
Nebraska	Jim Smith R
Nevada	Barbara Cegavske R
New Hampshire	Gary L. Daniels R
New Hampshire	Jordan G. Ulery R
New Jersey	Steve Oroho R
New Jersey	Jay Webber R
New Mexico	Paul C. Bandy R
New Mexico	William Payne R
New York	Owen H. Johnson R
North Carolina	Fred F. Steen II R
North Dakota	Alan H. Carlson R
North Dakota	Bette Grande R
Ohio	John Adams R

State	Leaders (Party)
Oklahoma	Gary Banz R
Oklahoma	Cliff Aldridge R
Oregon	Gene Whisnant R
Pennsylvania	Brian L. Ellis R
Rhode Island	Francis T. Maher Jr. R
Rhode Island	Jon D. Brien D
South Carolina	Liston Barfield R
South Carolina	Thomas Alexander R
South Dakota	Deb Peters R
South Dakota	Valentine B. Rausch R
Tennessee	Curry Todd R
Texas	Charles F. Howard R
Texas	Jim Jackson R
Texas	Kel Seliger R
Utah	Curtis S. Bramble R
Utah	Wayne L. Niederhauser R
Utah	Chris Herrod R
Vermont	Kevin J. Mullin R
Virginia	John A. Cosgrove Jr. R
Virginia	Stephen H. Martin R
Washington	Jan Angel R
Washington	Don Benton R
West Virginia	Eric Householder R
Wisconsin	Robin J. Vos R
Wyoming	Peter S. Illoway R

== Task force members ==
ALEC presently has 9 task forces to "commission research, publish papers, convene workshops, issue alerts, and serve as clearinghouses of information on free market policies in the states." Each task force is co-chaired by one state legislator (termed "public") and one corporate representative(termed "private"), but Private Co-Chairs have veto power over final decisions of their task force. The primary goal of these task forces is to develop model policies for the country. "The centerpiece to the Task Forces is ALEC's model legislation. To date, ALEC has considered, written, and approved hundreds of model bills, resolutions, and policy statements."

- Civil Justice
  - Lance Kinzer, R, Kansas representative
  - Victor Schwartz, representing Shook, Hardy & Bacon
- Commerce, Insurance, and Economic Development
  - Dawn Pettengill, R, Iowa representative
  - Emory Wilkerson, representing State Farm Insurance
- Communications and Technology
  - Blair Thoreson, R, North Dakota representative
  - Bartlett Cleland, representing the Institute for Policy Innovation
- Education and Workforce Development
  - Howard Stephenson, R, Utah senator
  - Jonathan Butcher, representing Goldwater Institute
- Energy, Environment, and Agriculture
  - Thomas Lockhart, R, Wyoming representative
  - Paul Loeffelman, representing American Electric Power
- Health and Human Services
  - Judson Hill, R, Georgia senator
  - Marianne Eterno, representing Guarantee Trust Life Insurance Company
- International Relations
  - Tim Moffitt, R, North Carolina representative
  - Brandie Davis, representing Philip Morris International
  - International Delegates
    - Senator Cory Bernardi, Australia
    - MEP Adam Bielan, Poland
    - MEP Martin Callanan, United Kingdom
    - MEP Philip Claeys, Belgium
    - MP David Darchiashvili, Georgia
    - MEP Niranjan Deva, United Kingdom
    - MEP Christofer Fjellner, Sweden
    - MEP Daniel Hannan, United Kingdom
    - MP Chris Heaton-Harris, United Kingdom
    - MEP Roger Helmer, United Kingdom
    - Assemblywoman Ayesha Javed, Pakistan
    - MEP Syed Kamall, United Kingdom
    - MEP Michal Kaminski, Poland
    - MEP Miroslaw Piotrowski, Poland
    - MEP Ivo Strejcek, Czech Republic
    - MEP Konrad Szymanski, Poland
- Justice Performance Project
  - Christopher B. Shank, R, Maryland senator
  - Stacie Rumenap, representing Stop Child Predators
- Tax and Fiscal Policy
  - Ken Weyler, R, New Hampshire representative
  - Amanda Klump, representing Altria

== Contributing authors ==
- Dr. Matthew Ladner, Nevada Policy Research Institute
- Dan Lips, Goldwater Institute
- Dr. Vicki E. (Murray) Alger, Vicki Murray & Associates LLC

== Corporate and non-profit members ==
- Allergan
- Altria (formerly known as Philip Morris)
- American Bail Coalition
- American Bankers Association
- American Council of Life Insurers
- American Insurance Association
- American Legal Financial Association
- American Petroleum Institute
- American Tort Reform Association
- Americans for Tax Reform
- Amoco
- Anheuser-Busch
- AstraZeneca
- Bayer
- Blue Cross Blue Shield
- BNSF Railway
- Bristol-Myers Squibb
- Cato Institute
- Celgene
- Center for Competitive Politics
- Center for Digital Media Freedom
- Centerpoint360
- CenturyLink
- Charter Communications
- Cintra
- Citizens in Charge Foundation
- Civil Justice Reform Group
- Community Financial Services Association
- Con-way
- ConocoPhillips
- Corrections Corporation of America
- Coventry Health Care
- Crown Cork and Seal Company
- CTIA – The Wireless Association
- DCI Group
- Diageo
- DirecTV
- Dow Chemical
- Duke Energy
- DuPont
- Eli Lilly
- Enterprise Holdings
- Entertainment Software Association
- Entergy
- ExxonMobil
- Fadem & Associates
- Federalist Society
- FedEx
- Foundation for Excellence in Education
- Free State Foundation
- Genentech
- Geo Group (formerly known as Wackenhut)
- Georgia Pacific
- GlaxoSmithKline
- Heartland Institute
- Higher Education Research/Policy Center
- Institute for Justice
- Institute for Legal Reform
- Institute for Policy Innovation
- International Franchise Association
- James Madison Institute
- Justice Fellowship
- Kansas City Power and Light
- Koch Industries
- Lawyers for Civil Justice
- Macquarie Capital
- Management and Training Corporation
- McLeod County Farmers Union
- MV VeriSol
- National Association of Mutual Insurance Companies
- National Beer Wholesalers Association
- National Cable and Telecommunications Association
- National Coalition for Safer Roads
- National Federation of Independent Business
- National Pawnbrokers Association
- National Popular Vote
- National Rifle Association of America
- NetChoice
- News Corporation (parent company of Twentieth Century Fox, Wall Street Journal and Fox News)
- Novartis
- Oracle
- Orchid Cellmark
- Pacific Research Institute
- Pfizer
- PhRMA
- Pickle Consulting Group
- Pioneer Institute
- Progress and Freedom Foundation
- Property Casualty Insurers
- Raytheon
- Reason Foundation
- Reckitt Benckiser Pharmaceuticals
- Salesforce
- Sanofi Aventis
- Satellite Broadcasting and Communications Association
- Schering Plough
- Serlin Hale
- Sprint Nextel
- State Farm Insurance
- State Policy Network
- Stop Child Predators
- Taser International
- Thomson Reuters
- Time Warner
- United Health
- United Parcel Service
- US Chamber of Commerce
- Wine Institute
- Wireless Generation
- Wise Carter Child & Caraway
- Xcel Energy

== Legislative members ==
=== Alabama ===
- Victor Gaston, R, Speaker Pro Tempore, Alabama House of Representatives
- Cam Ward, R, Alabama House of Representatives
- Jack Williams, R, Alabama House of Representatives

=== Alaska ===
- Wes Keller, R, Alaska House of Representatives
- Bob Lynn, R, Alaska House of Representatives

=== Arizona ===
- Nancy Barto, R, Arizona House of Representatives
- Andy Biggs (politician), R, Majority leader Arizona Senate
- Rich Crandall, R, Arizona Senate
- Adam Driggs, R, Arizona Senate
- Eddie Farnsworth, R, Arizona House of Representatives
- David Gowan, R, Arizona House of Representatives
- Debbie Lesko, R, Majority Whip Arizona House of Representatives
- John McComish, R, Arizona Senate
- Don Shooter, R, Arizona Senate
- Steve Smith, R, Arizona Senate
- Kimberly Yee, R, Arizona House of Representatives

=== Arkansas ===
- Duncan Baird, R, Arkansas House of Representatives
- Cecile Bledsoe, R, Arkansas Senate
- Skip Carnine, R, Arkansas House of Representatives
- Davy Carter, R, Arkansas House of Representatives
- Alan Clark, R, Arkansas State Senate
- Linda Collins-Smith, R, Arkansas House of Representatives
- Ann Clemmer, R, Arkansas House of Representatives
- Jane English, R, Arkansas House of Representatives and Arkansas Senate
- Jon Eubanks, R, Arkansas House of Representatives
- Ed Garner, R, Arkansas House of Representatives
- Jeremy Hutchinson, R, Arkansas Senate
- Jimmy Jeffress, D, Arkansas Senate
- Johnny Key, R, Arkansas Senate
- Jason Rapert, R, Arkansas Senate
- Bill Sample, R, Arkansas House of Representatives
- Mary Lou Slinkard, R, Arkansas House of Representatives
- Jerry Taylor, D, Arkansas Senate

=== California ===
- Joel Anderson, R, California State Senate
- Dan Logue, R, California State Assembly

=== Colorado ===
- Cindy Acree, R, Colorado House of Representatives
- Greg Brophy, R, Colorado Senate
- Bill Cadman, R, Colorado House of Representatives
- Robert Gardner, R, Colorado House of Representatives
- B.J. Nikkel, R, Colorado House of Representatives
- Nancy Spence, R, Colorado Senate
- Mark Waller, R, Colorado House of Representatives

=== Connecticut ===
- Bill Aman, R, Connecticut House of Representatives
- Christie Carpino, R, Connecticut House of Representatives
- DebraLee Hovey, R Connecticut House of Representatives
- Themis Klarides, R, Connecticut House of Representatives
- David Labriola, R, Connecticut House of Representatives
- Lawrence G. Miller, R, Connecticut House of Representatives
- Rosa Rebimbas, R, Connecticut House of Representatives
- John Shaban, R, Connecticut House of Representatives
- Kevin D. Witkos, R Connecticut Senate

=== Delaware ===
- Bradford Bennett, D, Delaware House of Representatives
- David McBride, D, Delaware Senate
- James P. Neal, Delaware Senate

=== Florida ===
- Rachel Burgin, R, Florida House of Representatives
- Brad Drake, R, Florida House of Representatives
- Matt Hudson, R, Florida House of Representatives
- Dave Murzin, R, Florida House of Representatives
- Jimmy Patronis, R, Florida House of Representatives
- John Wood, R, Florida House of Representatives

=== Georgia ===
- Don Balfour, R, Georgia Senate
- Charlice Byrd, R, Georgia House of Representatives
- David Casas, R, Georgia House of Representatives
- Josh Clark, R, Georgia House of Representatives
- Doug Collins, R, Georgia House of Representatives
- Kevin Cooke, R, Georgia House of Representatives
- Sharon Cooper, R, Georgia House of Representatives
- Bill Cowsert, R, Georgia Senate
- Johnny Grant, R, Georgia Senator
- Mark Hamilton, R, Georgia House of Representatives
- William Harmick, R, Georgia Senate
- Calvin Hill Jr., R, Georgia House of Representatives
- Bob Horne, R, Georgia House of Representatives
- Edward Lindsey, R, Georgia House of Representatives
- Barry Loudermilk, R, Georgia House of Representatives
- John Lunsford, R, Georgia House of Representatives
- Billy Maddox, R, Georgia House of Representatives
- Charles Martin, R, Georgia House of Representatives
- James Mills, R, Georgia House of Representatives
- Jack Murphy, R, Georgia Senate
- Jay Neal, R, Georgia House of Representatives
- Tom Price, R, U.S. Representative, Chairman, House Republican Policy Committee
- Tom Rice, R, Georgia House of Representatives
- Chip Rogers, R, Senate Majority Leader Georgia State Senate
- Mitch Seabaugh, R, resigned from Georgia Senate to become Deputy State Treasurer
- Donna Sheldon, R, Georgia House of Representatives
- Jesse Stone, R, Georgia Senate
- Renee Unterman, R, Georgia Senate

=== Hawaii ===
- Gene Ward, R, Hawaii House of Representatives

=== Idaho ===
- Scott Bedke, R, Idaho House of Representatives
- Darrell Bolz, R, Idaho House of Representatives
- Dean Cameron, R, Idaho Senate
- James Clark, R, Idaho House of Representatives
- Denton Darrington, R, Idaho Senate
- Frank Henderson, R, Idaho House of Representatives
- Patti Anne Lodge, R, Idaho Senate
- Shirley McKague, R, Idaho House of Representatives
- Jim Patrick, R, Idaho House of Representatives
- Bert Stevenson, R, Idaho House of Representatives
- Jeff Thompson, R, Idaho House of Representatives

=== Illinois ===
- Tom Cross, R, Illinois House of Representatives
- Kirk Dillard, R, Illinois Senate
- Renée Kosel, R, Illinois House of Representatives
- Dennis Reboletti, R, Illinois House of Representatives
- David Reis, R, Illinois House of Representatives
- Dale Risinger, R, Illinois Senate
- Chapin Rose, R, Illinois House of Representatives
- Dan Rutherford, R, Illinois Senate

=== Indiana ===
- Brian Bosma, R, Indiana House of Representatives
- Timothy Brown, R, Indiana House of Representatives
- Jim Buck, R Indiana Senate
- Bill Davis, R, Indiana House of Representatives
- Richard Dodge, R, Indiana House of Representatives
- William Friend, R, Indiana House of Representatives
- David Frizzell, R, Indiana House of Representatives
- Douglas Gutwein, R, Indiana House of Representatives
- Eric Koch, R, Indiana House of Representatives
- Eric Turner, R, Indiana House of Representatives
- Jackie Walorski, R, Indiana House of Representatives

=== Iowa ===
- Betty DeBoef, R, Iowa House of Representatives
- Sandra Greiner, R, Iowa Senate
- Chris Hagenow, R, Iowa House of Representatives
- Tim Kapucian, R, Iowa Senate
- Doris Kelley, D, Iowa House of Representatives
- Linda J. Miller, R, Iowa House of Representatives
- Kim Pearson, R, Iowa Senate
- Dawn Pettengill, R, Iowa House of Representatives
- James Seymour, R, Iowa Senate
- Linda Upmeyer, Minority Whip Iowa House of Representatives
- Pat Ward, R, Iowa Senate
- Ralph Watts, R, Iowa House of Representatives
- Charles Schneider, R, Iowa Senate President
- Rob Taylor, R, Iowa House of Representatives

=== Kansas ===
- Karen Brownlee, R, Kansas Senate
- Terry Bruce, R, Kansas Senate
- Rob Bruchman, R, Kansas House of Representatives
- Steve Brunk, R, Kansas House of Representatives
- Terry Calloway, R, Kansas House of Representatives
- Richard Carlson, R, Kansas House of Representatives
- Pete DeGraff, R, Kansas House of Representatives
- Mario Goico, R, Kansas House of Representatives
- Terri Lois Gregory, R, Kansas House of Representatives
- Amanda Grosserode, R, Kansas House of Representatives
- Gary Hayzlett, R, Kansas House of Representatives
- Carl Holmes, R, Kansas House of Representatives
- Mitch Holmes, R, Kansas House of Representatives
- Steve Huebert, R, Kansas House of Representatives
- Richard Kelsey, R, Kansas Senate
- Lance Kinzer, R, Kansas House of Representatives
- Marvin Kleeb, R, Kansas House of Representatives
- Forrest Knox, R, Kansas House of Representatives
- Garret Love, R, Kansas Senate
- Julia Lynn, R, Kansas Senate
- Peggy Mast, R, Assistant Majority Leader Kansas House of Representatives
- Ty Masterson, R, Kansas Senate
- Kelly Meigs, R, Kansas House of Representatives
- Raymond Merrick, R, Kansas Senate
- Susan Mosier, R, Kansas House of Representatives
- Don Myers, R, Kansas House of Representatives
- Ralph Ostmeyer, R, Kansas Senate
- Joe Patton, R, Kansas House of Representatives
- Mike Petersen, R, Kansas Senate
- Mary Pilcher-Cook, R, Iowa Senate
- Larry Powell, R, Kansas House of Representatives
- Dennis Pyle, R, Kansas Senate
- Marc Rhoades, R, Kansas House of Representatives
- John Rubin, R, Kansas House of Representatives
- Ronald Ryckman, R, Kansas House of Representatives
- Scott Schwab, R, Kansas House of Representatives
- Sharon Schwartz, R, Kansas House of Representatives
- Chris Steineger, R, Kansas Senate
- Susan Wagle, R, Kansas Senate

=== Kentucky ===
- Walter Blevins, D, Kentucky Senate
- Tom Buford, R, Kentucky House of Representatives
- Julian Carroll, D, former governor of Kentucky, Kentucky Senate
- Ron Crimm, R, Kentucky House of Representatives
- Julie Denton, R, Kentucky Senate
- Joseph Fischer, R, Kentucky House of Representatives
- Mike Harmon, R, Kentucky House of Representatives
- Ray Jones II, D, Kentucky Senate
- Alice Kerr, R, Kentucky House of Representatives
- Sal Santoro, R, Kentucky House of Representatives
- Dan Seum, R, Republican Caucus chair Kentucky Senate
- Robert Stivers, R, Majority Leader Kentucky Senate
- Johnny Ray Turner, D, Democratic Caucus chair Kentucky Senate
- Jackie Westwood, R, Kentucky House of Representatives

=== Louisiana ===
- Jack Donahue, R, Louisiana State Senate
- Franklin Foil, R, Louisiana House of Representatives
- Frank A. Hoffmann, R, Louisiana House of Representatives
- Daniel Martiny, R, Louisiana Senate
- Fred Mills, R, Louisiana House of Representatives
- Neil Riser, R, Louisiana State Senate

=== Maine ===
- Ken Fletcher, R, Maine House of Representatives
- Debra Plowman, R, Maine Senate
- Richard Rosen, R, Maine Senate
- Michael Thibodeau, R, Maine Senate

=== Maryland ===
- Gail Bates, R, Maryland House of Delegates
- Donald Dwyer, R, Maryland House of Delegates
- Adelaide Eckardt, R, Maryland Senate
- Joseph Getty, R, Maryland House of Delegates
- Jeannie Haddaway-Riccio, R, Maryland House of Delegates
- Michael Hough, R, Maryland House of Delegates
- Susan Krebs, R, Maryland House of Delegates
- Susan McComas, R, Maryland House of Delegates
- Neil Parrott, R, Maryland House of Delegates
- Christopher Shank, R, Maryland Senate
- Tanya Shewell, R, Maryland House of Delegates
- Nancy Stocksdale, R, Maryland House of Delegates

=== Massachusetts ===
- Nicholas Boldyga, R, Massachusetts House of Representatives
- Harriett Stanley, D, Massachusetts House of Representatives

=== Michigan ===
- Bruce Caswell, R, Michigan House of Representatives
- Alan Cropsey
- Kenneth Horn, R, Michigan House of Representatives
- Kenneth Kurtz, R, Michigan House of Representatives
- Matthew Lori, R, Michigan House of Representatives
- Tonya Schuitmaker, R, Michigan Senate

=== Minnesota ===
- Bruce Anderson, R, Minnesota House of Representatives
- Paul Anderson, R, Minnesota House of Representatives
- King Banaian, R, Minnesota House of Representatives
- Michael Beard, R, Minnesota House of Representatives
- Mike Benson, R, Minnesota House of Representatives
- Roger Chamberlain, R, Minnesota Senate
- Matt Dean, R, Majority Leader, Minnesota House of Representatives
- Connie Doepke, R, Minnesota House of Representatives
- Steve Drazkowski, R, Minnesota House of Representatives
- Sondra Erickson, R, Minnesota House of Representatives
- Pat Garofalo, R, Minnesota House of Representatives
- Chris Gerlach, R, Minnesota Senate
- Gretchen Hoffman, R, Minnesota Senate
- Michael Jungbauer, R, Minnesota Senate
- Warren Limmer, R, Minnesota Senate
- Carol McFarlane, R, Minnesota House of Representatives
- Pam Myhra, R, Minnesota House of Representatives
- Gen Olson, R, Minnesota Senate
- Mike Parry, R, Minnesota Senate
- Joyce Peppin, R, Minnesota House of Representatives
- Linda Runbeck, R, Minnesota House of Representatives
- Ron Shimanski, R, Minnesota House of Representatives
- Dean Urdahl, R, Minnesota House of Representatives
- Kurt Zellers, R, Speaker of the Minnesota House of Representatives

=== Mississippi ===
- Mark Baker, R, Mississippi House of Representatives
- Charles Jim Beckett, R, Mississippi House of Representatives
- Nickey Reed Browning, R, Mississippi State Senate
- Lester Carpenter, R, Mississippi House of Representatives
- Lydia Chassaniol, R, Mississippi State Senate
- Becky Currie, R, Mississippi House of Representatives
- William Denny Jr., R, Mississippi House of Representatives
- Jim Ellington, R, Mississippi House of Representatives
- Harvey Fillingane, R, Mississippi House of Representatives
- Joey Fillingane, R, Mississippi State Senate
- Jeffrey Guice, R, Mississippi House of Representatives
- Philip Gunn, R, Speaker Mississippi House of Representatives
- Briggs Hopson, R, Mississippi State Senate
- Kevin McGee, R, Mississippi House of Representatives
- Walter Michel, R, Mississippi State Senate
- Margaret Ellis Rogers, R, Mississippi House of Representatives
- Elton Gregory Snowden, R, Mississippi House of Representatives
- Gary Staples, R, Mississippi House of Representatives
- Jerry Turner, R, Mississippi State Senate
- Tommy Woods, R, Mississippi House of Representatives

=== Missouri ===
- Sue Allen, R, Missouri House of Representatives
- Jane Cunningham, R, Missouri Senate
- Stanley Cox, R, Missouri House of Representatives
- Scott Dieckhaus, R, Missouri House of Representatives
- John Diehl, R, Missouri House of Representatives
- Tony Dugger, R, Missouri of Representatives
- Sue Entlicher, R, Missouri of Representatives
- Dave Hinson, R, Missouri of Representatives
- Tim Jones, R, Majority Leader, Missouri House of Representatives
- Rob Mayer, R, President Pro Tempore, Missouri Senate
- Cole McNary, R, Missouri House of Representatives, current candidate for Missouri State Treasurer
- Kathleen Meiners, R, Missouri House of Representatives
- Brian Munzlinger, R, Missouri Senate
- Brian Nieves, R, Missouri Senate
- Mike Parson, R, Missouri Governor
- Therese Sander, R, Missouri House of Representatives
- Rodney Schad, R, Missouri House of Representatives
- Vicki Schneider, R, Missouri House of Representatives
- Jason T. Smith, R, Missouri House of Representatives
- Steve Tilley, R, Speaker of the Missouri House of Representatives
- Billy Pat Wright, R, Missouri House of Representatives

=== Montana ===
- Dee L. Brown, R, Montana House of Representatives
- Kris Hansen, R, Montana House of Representatives
- Dennis Himmelberger, R, Montana House of Representatives
- David Howard, R, Montana House of Representatives
- Llewelyn Jones, R, Montana House of Representatives
- Steve Lavin, R, MontanaHouse of Representatives
- Gary MacLaren, R, Montana House of Representatives
- Tom McGillvray, R, Montana House of Representatives
- Mike Miller, R, Montana House of Representatives
- Michael More, R, Montana House of Representatives
- Amy Stasia Perkins, R, Montana Senate
- Lawrence Perkins, R, Montana Senate
- Ken Peterson, R, Montana House of Representatives
- Scott Reichner, R, Montana House of Representatives
- Cary Smith, R, Montana House of Representatives

=== Nebraska ===
- Pam Brown, Nebraska Legislature
- Deb Fischer, Nebraska Legislature, elected to United States Senate as a Republican
- Ken Haar, Nebraska Legislature
- Jeremiah Nordquist, Nebraska Legislature
- Jim Smith, Nebraska Legislature

=== Nevada ===
- Barbara Cegavske, R, Nevada Senate
- Don Gustavson, R, Nevada Senate
- Dean Rhoads, R, Nevada Senate
- James Settelmeyer, R, Nevada Senate

=== New Hampshire ===
- Mary M. Allen, R, New Hampshire House of Representatives
- Gary L. Daniels, R, New Hampshire House of Representatives
- William L. O'Brien, R, Speaker, New Hampshire House of Representatives
- Elaine Swinford, R, New Hampshire House of Representatives
- Joseph Thomas, R, New Hampshire House of Representatives
- Jordan G. Ulery, R, New Hampshire House of Representatives
- Maurice Villeneuve, R, New Hampshire House of Representatives
- Francine Wendelboe, R, New Hampshire House of Representatives

=== New Jersey ===
- Mary Pat Angelini, R, New Jersey General Assembly
- Christopher "Kip" Bateman, R, New Jersey Senate
- Anthony Bucco, R, New Jersey Senate
- Gerald Cardinale, R, New Jersey Senate
- Steven Oroho, R, New Jersey Senate
- Jay Webber, R, New Jersey General Assembly

=== New Mexico ===
- Rod Adair, R, no longer in New Mexico Senate
- Janice Arnold-Jones, R, no longer in New Mexico House of Representatives
- Vernon Asbill, R, no longer in New Mexico Senate
- Paul Bandy, R, New Mexico House of Representatives
- Mark Boitano, R, no longer in New Mexico Senate
- Kent Cravens, R, no longer in New Mexico Senate
- Anna Marie Crook, R, New Mexico House of Representatives
- Stuart Ingle, R, Minority leader New Mexico Senate
- Dennis Kintigh, R, no longer in New Mexico House of Representatives
- William Payne, R, Minority Whip New Mexico Senate
- William Rehm, R, New Mexico House of Representatives
- William Sharer, R, New Mexico Senate
- Thomas C. Taylor, R, New Mexico House of Representatives

=== New York ===
- Owen H. Johnson, R, New York State Senate

=== North Carolina ===
- Hugh Blackwell, R, North Carolina General Assembly
- Justin Burr, R, North Carolina General Assembly
- Debbie Clary, R, North Carolina Senate
- George Cleveland, R, North Carolina General Assembly
- Daniel McComas, R, North Carolina General Assembly
- Tim Moore, R, North Carolina General Assembly
- Paul Stam, R, North Carolina General Assembly

=== North Dakota ===
- John Andrist, R, North Dakota Senate
- Randy Boehning, R, North Dakota House of Representatives
- Alan H. Carlson, R, Majority Leader North Dakota House of Representatives
- Bette Grande, R, North Dakota House of Representatives
- Patrick Hatlestad, R, North Dakota House of Representatives
- Craig Headland, R, North Dakota House of Representatives
- Lawrence Klemin, R, North Dakota House of Representatives
- Kim Koppelman, R, North Dakota House of Representatives
- Karen Krebsbach, R, North Dakota Senate
- David Nething, R, North Dakota Senate
- Blair Thoreson, R, North Dakota House of Representatives
- Dwight Wrangham, R, North Dakota House of Representatives

=== Ohio ===
- John Adams, R, Ohio House of Representatives
- Danny Bubp, R, Ohio House of Representatives
- Ron Amstutz, R, Ohio House of Representatives
- Peter Beck, R, Ohio House of Representatives
- Louis Blessing, R, Ohio House of Representatives
- John Boehner, R, Speaker of the United States House of Representatives
- William Coley, R, Ohio House of Representatives
- Tim Derickson, R, Ohio House of Representatives
- Matt Huffman, R, Ohio House of Representatives
- Casey Kozlowski, R, Ohio House of Representatives
- Frank LaRose, R, Ohio Senate
- Ronald Maag, R, Ohio House of Representatives
- Jarrod Martin, R, Ohio House of Representatives
- Barbara Sears, R, Ohio House of Representatives
- Bill Seitz, R, Ohio Senate
- Andrew Thompson, R, Ohio House of Representatives
- Joe Uecker, R, Ohio House of Representatives
- Lynn Wachtmann, R, Ohio House of Representatives

=== Oklahoma ===
- Gary Banz, R, Oklahoma House of Representatives
- Bill Brown, R, Oklahoma Senate
- Lisa Johnson-Billy, R, Oklahoma House of Representatives
- Sally Kern, R, Oklahoma House of Representatives
- Stephen C. Martin, R, Oklahoma House of Representatives
- Michael Mazzei, R, Oklahoma Senate
- Mark McCullough, R, Oklahoma House of Representatives
- Pam Peterson, R, Oklahoma House of Representatives
- Gary Stanislawski, R, Oklahoma Senate
- G. Harold Wright, R, Oklahoma House of Representatives

=== Oregon ===
- Kevin Cameron, R, Oregon House of Representatives
- Jason Conger, R, Oregon House of Representatives
- Sal Esquivel, R, Oregon House of Representatives
- Ted Ferrioli, R, Oregon House of Representatives
- Tim Freeman, R, Oregon House of Representatives
- Larry George, R, Oregon House of Representatives
- Fred Girod, R, Oregon House of Representatives
- Bruce Hanna, R, Co-Speaker of the Oregon House of Representatives
- Wally Hicks, R, Oregon House of Representatives
- John Huffman, R, Oregon House of Representatives
- Mark Johnson, R, Oregon House of Representatives
- Bill Kennemer, R, Oregon House of Representatives
- Shawn Lindsay, R, Oregon House of Representatives
- Mike McLane, R, Oregon House of Representatives
- Sherrie Sprenger, R, Oregon House of Representatives
- Kim Thatcher, R, Oregon House of Representatives
- Jim Thompson, R, Oregon House of Representatives
- Matthew Wand, R, Oregon House of Representatives
- Gene Whisnant, R, Oregon House of Representatives

=== Pennsylvania ===
- Matthew Baker, R, Pennsylvania House of Representatives
- Brian L. Ellis, Pennsylvania House of Representatives
- John R. Evans, R, Pennsylvania House of Representatives
- Tim Krieger, R, Pennsylvania House of Representatives
- Ronald Marsico, R, Pennsylvania House of Representatives
- Bob Mensch, R, Pennsylvania Senate
- Ron Miller, R, Pennsylvania House of Representatives

=== Rhode Island ===
- Jon Brien, D, Rhode Island House of Representatives
- Paul Jabour, D, Rhode Island Senate
- Francis T. Maher Jr., R, Rhode Island Senate
- Robert A. Watson, R, Rhode Island House of Representatives

=== South Carolina ===
- Thomas Alexander, R, South Carolina Senate
- Jimmy Bales, R, South Carolina House of Representatives
- Liston Barfield, R, South Carolina House of Representatives
- Joan Brady, R, South Carolina House of Representatives
- Chip Campsen, R, South Carolina Senate
- Harry Cato, R, Speaker Pro Tempore South Carolina House of Representatives
- Bobby Harrell, R, Speaker, South Carolina House of Representatives
- Larry A. Martin, R, South Carolina Senate
- Harvey S. Peeler Jr., R, Majority Leader, South Carolina Senate
- Mike Rose, R, South Carolina Senate
- Garry Smith, R, South Carolina House of Representatives
- Thad Viers, R, South Carolina House of Representatives
- Kent M. Williams, D, South Carolina Senate

=== South Dakota ===
- Kristin Conzet, R, South Dakota House of Representatives
- Bob Deelstra, R, South Dakota House of Representatives
- Brian Gosch, R, South Dakota House of Representatives
- Jon Hansen, R, South Dakota House of Representatives
- Tom Hansen, R, South Dakota Senate
- Roger Hunt, R, South Dakota House of Representatives
- Phil Jensen, R, South Dakota House of Representatives
- Stacey Nelson, R, South Dakota House of Representatives
- David Novstrup, R, South Dakota House of Representatives
- Betty Olson, R, South Dakota House of Representatives
- Russell Olson, R, South Dakota House of Representatives
- Deb Peters, R, South Dakota Senate
- Valentine B. Rausch, R, South Dakota House of Representatives

=== Tennessee ===
- Joe C. Carr, R, Tennessee House of Representatives
- Vince Dean, R, Tennessee House of Representatives
- Vance Dennis, R, Tennessee House of Representatives
- Jimmy Eldridge, R, Tennessee House of Representatives
- Joshua Evans, R, Tennessee House of Representatives
- Dale Ford, R, Tennessee House of Representatives
- Kelly Keisling, R, Tennessee House of Representatives
- Brian Kelsey, R, Tennessee Senate
- Jon Lundberg, R, Tennessee House of Representatives
- Susan Lynn, R, Tennessee House of Representatives
- Gerald McCormick, R, Tennessee House of Representatives
- Steve McDaniel, R, Tennessee House of Representatives
- Richard Montgomery, R, Tennessee House of Representatives
- Mark Norris, R, Majority Leader Tennessee Senate
- Barrett Rich, R, Tennessee House of Representatives
- Charles Sargent, R, Tennessee House of Representatives
- Tony Shipley, R, Tennessee House of Representatives
- Curry Todd, R, Tennessee House of Representatives

=== Texas ===
- William Callegari, R, Texas House of Representatives
- Byron Cook, R, Texas House of Representatives
- Allen Fletcher, R, Texas House of Representatives
- Dan Flynn, R, Texas House of Representatives
- Mike Hamilton, R, Texas House of Representatives
- Kelly Hancock, R, Texas House of Representatives
- Patricia Harless, R, Texas House of Representatives
- Chris Harris, R, Texas Senate
- Glenn Hegar, R, Texas House of Representatives
- Harvey Hilderbran, R, Texas House of Representatives
- Charles F. Howard, R, Texas House of Representatives
- Todd Hunter, R, Texas House of Representatives
- Jim Jackson, R, Texas House of Representatives
- Eric Johnson, D, Texas House of Representatives
- Jodie Anne Laubenberg, R, Texas House of Representatives, Texas chapter president in 2013
- Jerry Madden, R, Texas House of Representatives
- Rob Orr, R, Texas House of Representatives
- John Otto, R, Texas House of Representatives
- Larry Phillips, R, Texas House of Representatives
- Kel Seliger, R, Texas Senate
- Todd Smith, R, Texas House of Representatives
- Wayne Smith, R, Texas House of Representatives
- Larry Taylor, R, Texas House of Representatives

=== Utah ===
- Curtis S. Bramble, R, Utah Senate
- Wayne Harper, R, Utah House of Representatives
- Chris Herrod, R, Utah House of Representatives
- Todd Kiser, R, Utah House of Representatives
- Wayne L. Niederhauser, R, Utah Senate
- Stephen Urquhart, R, Utah Senate
- Michael Waddoups, R, Utah Senate
- Carl Wimmer, R, Utah House of Representatives

=== Vermont ===
- Patrick Brennan, R, Vermont House of Representatives
- Margaret Flory, R, Vermont Senate
- Kathleen Keenan, R, Vermont House of Representatives
- Kevin J. Mullin, R, Assistant Minority Leader Vermont Senate

=== Virginia ===
- David Albo, R, Virginia House of Delegates
- Kathy Byron, R, Virginia House of Delegates
- Benjamin Cline, R, Virginia House of Delegates
- Mark Cole, R, Virginia House of Delegates
- John A. Cosgrove Jr., R, Virginia House of Delegates
- William Howell, R, Virginia House of Delegates
- William Janis, R, Virginia House of Delegates
- Terry Kilgore, R, Virginia House of Delegates
- L. Scott Lingamfelter, R, Virginia House of Delegates
- James Massie, R, Virginia House of Delegates
- Stephen H. Martin, R, Virginia House of Delegates
- Thomas Norment, R, Virginia Senate
- Christopher Peace, R, Virginia House of Delegates
- Lacey Putney, Independent (caucuses with R), Virginia House of Delegates
- Frederick Quayle, R, Virginia Senate
- Frank Ruff, R, Virginia Senate
- Richard Tata, R, Virginia House of Delegates

=== Washington ===
- Jan Angel, R, Washington Senate
- Don Benton, R, Washington Senate, retired
- Linda Evans Parlette, R, Washington Senate
- Bill Hinkle, R, Washington House of Representatives, retired
- Troy Kelley, D, former Washington State Auditor
- Charles Ross, R, Washington House of Representatives, retired
- Matt Shea, R, Washington House of Representatives
- Val Stevens, R, Washington Senate, retired

=== West Virginia ===
- Eric Householder, R, West Virginia House of Delegates
- Larry Kump, R, West Virginia House of Delegates

=== Wisconsin ===
- Kathy Bernier, R, Wisconsin State Assembly
- Alberta Darling, R, Wisconsin State Senate
- Mike Endsley, R, Wisconsin State Assembly
- Scott Fitzgerald, R, Wisconsin State Senate, Majority Leader
- Chris Kapenga, R, Wisconsin State Assembly
- John Klenke, R, Wisconsin State Assembly
- Scott Krug, R, Wisconsin State Assembly
- Mike Kuglitsch, R, Wisconsin State Assembly
- Frank Lasee, R, Wisconsin State Senate
- Mary Lazich, R, Wisconsin State Senate
- Terry Moulton, R, Wisconsin State Senate
- John Nygren, R, Wisconsin State Senate
- Patricia Strachota, R, Majority Leader of the Wisconsin State Assembly
- Chris Taylor, D, Wisconsin State Assembly
- Travis Tranel – no longer a member. Left Dec 2012, R, Wisconsin State Assembly
- Robin J. Vos, R, Speaker of the Wisconsin State Assembly

=== Wyoming ===
- Jon Botten, R, Wyoming House of Representatives
- Bruce Burns, R, Wyoming Senate
- Richard Cannady, R, Wyoming House of Representatives
- Cale Case, R, Wyoming Senate
- Amy Edmonds, R, Wyoming House of Representatives
- John Hastert, R, Wyoming Senate
- Peter S. Illoway, R, Wyoming House of Representatives
- Allen Jaggi, R, Wyoming House of Representatives
- Grant Larson, R, Wyoming Senate
- Carl Loucks, R, Wyoming House of Representatives
- Curt Meier, R, Wyoming Senate
- Lorraine Quarberg, R, Wyoming House of Representatives
- Lisa Shepperson, R, Wyoming House of Representatives
- Tim Stubson, R, Wyoming House of Representatives
- Clarence Vranish, R, Wyoming House of Representatives
- Sue Wallis, R, Wyoming House of Representatives
- Daniel Zwonitzer, R, Wyoming House of Representatives

== See also ==
- List of former members
