= Hinson =

Hinson may refer to:

- Ashley Hinson, American politician
- Hinson (surname)
- Hinson, Florida, United States
- Hinson Mounds, a historic site near Miles City, Florida, United States
- Hinson's Island, Bermuda
- The Hinsons, several different southern gospel singing groups
