= Hinson (surname) =

Hinson is a surname

== List of people with the surname ==
- Ashley Hinson (born 1983), American politician
- Barry Hinson (born 1961), American basketball coach
- Blake Hinson (born 1999), American basketball player
- Dave Hinson (born 1972), American politician
- David R. Hinson (1933–2023), American pilot and former head of Midway Airlines
- Darnell Hinson (born 1980), American basketball player
- Jon Hinson (1942–1995), American politician from Mississippi
- Jack Hinson (c. 1807–1874), Confederate sniper of the American Civil War
- Jimbeau Hinson (1952–2022), American country music singer
- Jordan Hinson (born 1991), American actress
- Lance Hinson, American coach of college football
- Larry Hinson (born 1944), American professional golfer
- Micah P. Hinson (born 1981), American Americana singer and guitarist
- Paul Hinson (1904–1960), American professional baseball player
- Roy Hinson (born 1961), American professional basketball player
- Yvonne Hayes Hinson, American politician
- Unknown Hinson (born Stuart Daniel Baker in 1954), musician and voice actor
- The Hinsons (namely Ronny, Kenny, Larry, Yvonne, Eric and Bo), an American Southern Gospel group

== See also ==
- Hansen (surname)
- Hanson (surname)
- Henson (name)
- Kinson
- Linson
