= List of former members of the American Legislative Exchange Council =

The American Legislative Exchange Council, otherwise known by the acronym ALEC, is a non-profit 501(c) political organization established in 1975. The legislative members are state and federal legislators. It is a forum to allow the members to write model laws and discuss legislative language with other members. ALEC meetings are an opportunity for the corporate and non-profit leaders to meet and provide feedback to legislators. Member legislators can then use the model bills as templates for their own bills.

Members here are listed as former members by virtue of the end of their terms in office of the various state legislatures, a necessary qualifier for membership in ALEC. None of these former members resigned from ALEC. See Resigned legislative members for the individuals who have announced they are no longer members by choice.

ALEC keeps its membership, activities and communications confidential. This list includes former members whose identity primarily has become known through internal documents revealed to Common Cause and by research by members of the press.

== Notable former legislative members ==
Early members included a number of state and local politicians who went on to statewide or national office, including Bob Kasten and Tommy Thompson of Wisconsin, John Engler of Michigan, Terry Branstad of Iowa, and John Kasich of Ohio. Several members of Congress were also involved in the organization during its early years, including Sen. James L. Buckley and Rep. Jack Kemp of New York, Sen. Jesse Helms of North Carolina, and Rep. Phil Crane of Illinois. More recently, Eric Cantor Majority Leader of the U.S. House of Representatives was an alumnus.

== Former elected government official members ==
=== Former state level members ===
Arizona

- Kirk Adams, R, former Speaker, House of Representatives, 2012 candidate for U.S. House of Representatives

Connecticut

- William Hamzy, R, former Deputy Minority Leader, House of Representatives

MARYLAND Phillip D Bissett, R Maryland House of Delegates James M Harkins, R Maryland House of Delegates

North Carolina

- Harold Brubaker, R, North Carolina General Assembly
- Fred F. Steen, II, R, North Carolina General Assembly

Utah

- Dan Liljenquist, R, resigned from State Senate to run for the U.S. Senate against Orrin Hatch

Virginia

- Beverly Sherwood, R, House of Delegates

Washington

- Michael Carrell, R, House of Representatives, former, died May 29, 2013

Wisconsin

- Joe Knilans, R, State Assembly
- Scott Suder, R, Minority Leader, State Assembly
- Bill Kramer, R, Wisconsin State Assembly
- Neal Kedzie, R, Wisconsin State Senate
- Mike Ellis, R, President of the Wisconsin State Senate
- Joe Leibham, R, President Pro Tempore Wisconsin State Senate

=== Former members elected to the U.S. House of Representatives ===
Alabama

- Spencer Bachus, R
- Mike D. Rogers, R

Alaska

- Don Young, R

Arizona

- David Schweikert, R

California

- John Campbell, R
- Jeff Denham, R
- Jerry Lewis, R
- Tom McClintock, R
- Edward Royce, R

Colorado

- Cory Gardner, R
- Doug Lamborn, R
- Ed Perlmutter, D
- Scott Tipton, R

Florida

- Sandy Adams, R
- Allen Boyd, D
- Ginny Brown-Waite, R
- Mario Díaz-Balart, R
- Suzanne Kosmas, D
- Kendrick Meek, D (also, unsuccessful candidate in the 2010 United States Senate election)
- John Mica, R
- Jeff Miller, R
- Bill Posey, R
- Adam Putnam, R (also, Florida Commissioner of Agriculture)
- David Rivera, R
- Ileana Ros-Lehtinen, R
- Dennis Ross, R
- Marco Rubio, R (also, United States Senate)
- Steve Southerland, R
- Daniel Webster, R

Georgia

- Phil Gingrey, R
- Tom Graves, R
- Jack Kingston, R
- Tom Price, R (former Chairman, House Republican Policy Committee)
- Austin Scott, R
- Lynn Westmoreland, R

Idaho

- Mike Simpson, R

Illinois

- Phil Crane, R (also, 1980 candidate for President of the United States)
- Henry Hyde, R ALEC Founder (now deceased)

Indiana

- Dan Burton, R
- Marlin Stutzman, R

Iowa

- Leonard Boswell, D
- Steve King, R

Kansas

- Lynn Jenkins, R
- Todd Tiahrt, R
- Kevin Yoder, R

Kentucky

- Brett Guthrie, R

Louisiana

- Rodney Alexander, R

Maryland

- Andy Harris, R

Michigan

- Dave Camp, R
- Mike J. Rogers, R

Minnesota

- Erik Paulsen, R

Mississippi

- Alan Nunnelee, R
- Steven Palazzo, R

Missouri

- Sam Graves, R
- Vicky Hartzler, R
- Dave Hinson, R (also, Missouri House of Representatives)
- Blaine Luetkemeyer, R

New Jersey

- Rodney Frelinghuysen, R
- Scott Garrett, R
- Frank LoBiondo, R

New York

- John M. McHugh, R (also, former United States Secretary of the Army)
- Jack Kemp, R (also, former United States Secretary of Housing and Urban Development, 1988 candidate for President of the United States and 1996 Republican Nominee for Vice President running with Bob Dole, now deceased)

North Carolina

- Howard Coble, R
- Walter B. Jones Jr., R

North Dakota

- Rick Berg, R

Ohio

- Steve Austria, R
- Bob Gibbs, R
- Jim Jordan, R
- Bob Latta, R
- Jean Schmidt, R
- Steve Stivers, R
- Pat Tiberi, R

Oklahoma

- Dan Boren, D
- Tom Cole, R
- Frank Lucas, R
- John Sullivan, R

Oregon

- Kurt Schrader, D

Pennsylvania

- Charlie Dent, R
- Michael Fitzpatrick, R
- James Gerlach, R
- Joseph Pitts, R
- Todd Platts, R

South Carolina

- Jeff Duncan, R
- Tim Scott, R
- Joe Wilson, R

South Dakota

- Kristi Noem, R

Tennessee

- Diane Black, R
- Marsha Blackburn, R

Texas

- Kevin Brady, R
- John Culberson, R
- Sam Johnson, R
- Kenny Marchant, R

Virginia

- Eric Cantor, R (also, former Majority leader)
- Randy Forbes, R
- Morgan Griffith, R

Washington

- Doc Hastings, R
- Jaime Herrera Beutler, R
- Cathy McMorris Rodgers, R

Wisconsin

- Glenn Grothman, R (also, Wisconsin State Senate)
- Mark Pocan, D (also, former Wisconsin State Assembly)

=== Former members elected to the U.S. Senate ===
Alabama

- Richard Shelby, R

Florida

- Marco Rubio, R

Idaho

- Jim Risch, R

Kansas

- Jerry Moran, R

Mississippi

- Roger Wicker, R

Nebraska

- Deb Fischer, R
- Mike Johanns, R

Nevada

- Paul Laxalt, R (also, former Governor, Lt. Governor, and 1988 candidate for President of the United States)

North Carolina

- Jesse Helms, R (5 terms, now deceased)

Oklahoma

- James Inhofe, R

South Carolina

- Lindsey Graham, R

West Virginia

- Joe Manchin, D

Wyoming

- Michael Enzi, R

=== Former members elected Governor ===
Arizona

- Jan Brewer, R, Governor

Colorado

- Bill Owens, R, former Governor

Indiana

- Mitch Daniels, R, Governor

Iowa

- Terry Branstad, R, Governor

Michigan

- John Engler, R, former Governor

Ohio

- John Kasich, R, Governor

Oklahoma

- Mary Fallin, R, Governor
- Frank Keating, R, former Governor

Pennsylvania

- Tom Ridge, R, former Governor, resigned to become Secretary of Homeland Security

South Carolina

- Nikki Haley, R, Governor

Utah

- Gary Herbert, R, Governor

Wisconsin

- Tommy Thompson, R, Governor
- Scott Walker, R, Governor

== Resigned legislative members ==
- Alma Allen (politician), D, Texas House of Representatives
- Lisa Boscola, D, Pennsylvania Senate
- Mike Colona, D, Minority Whip Missouri House of Representatives
- Danielle Conrad, D, Nebraska Legislature
- Greg Cromer, R, Louisiana House of Representatives
- Dawnna Dukes, D, Texas House of Representatives
- Harold Dutton, D, Texas House of Representatives
- Walter Felag, D, Rhode Island Senate
- Mary Flowers, D, Illinois House of Representatives
- Ken Haar, D, Nebraska Legislature
- Ted Harhai, D, Pennsylvania House of Representatives
- Denise Harper-Angel, D, Kentucky Senate
- Brian Hatfield, D, Washington Senate
- Eric Johnson, D, Texas House of Representatives
- Ray Jones II, D, Kentucky Senate
- William Keller, R, Pennsylvania House of Representatives
- Troy Kelley, D, Washington House of Representatives, once attended a meeting but claims he is no longer a member
- Tracy King, D, Texas House of Representatives
- Nick Kotik, D, Pennsylvania House of Representatives
- Joseph Markosek, D, Pennsylvania House of Representatives
- Armando Martinez, D, Texas House of Representatives
- Ruth Jones McClendon, D, Texas House of Representatives
- Heath Mello, D, Nebraska Legislature
- Jose Menendez, D, Texas House of Representatives
- George Muñoz, D, New Mexico Senate
- Jeremy Nordquist, D, Nebraska Legislature
- Nan Orrock, D, Georgia Senate
- Joseph Petrarca, D, Pennsylvania House of Representatives
- Brandon Phelps, D, Illinois House of Representatives
- Chente Quintanilla, D, Texas House of Representatives
- Brian Quirk, D, Iowa House of Representatives
- Harry Readshaw, D, Pennsylvania House of Representatives claims he didn't know he was a member
- Eddie Rodriguez, D, Texas House of Representatives
- Jennifer Seelig, D, Utah State House of Representatives
- Tim Shaughnessy, D, Kentucky Senate
- Kathy Stein, D, Kentucky Senate
- John Tassoni Jr, D, Rhode Island Senate
- Robert Theberge, D, New Hampshire House of Representatives
- Kevin Van De Wege, D, Washington House of Representatives
- Don Vaughan, D, Minority leader North Carolina Senate
- Ted Vick, D, South Carolina House of Representatives
- Hubert Vo, D, Texas House of Representatives
- Leanna Washington, D, Pennsylvania Senate
- Anthony Williams, D, Pennsylvania Senate

== Former corporate members ==
- Amazon.com
- American Traffic Solutions resigned April 13, 2012
- Amgen
- Arizona Public Service Company
- Best Buy
- Bill and Melinda Gates Foundation
- Blue Cross Blue Shield
- Cargill is listed as a member in 1998, but now denies ever having been a member
- Coca-Cola
- Comcast
- CVS Caremark
- Dell
- Enron (went bankrupt in 2001, see Enron scandal)
- Facebook
- General Motors
- Google
- Hewlett-Packard
- John Deere
- Johnson & Johnson
- Intuit
- Kaplan, Inc.
- Kraft Foods
- Louis Dreyfus Group
- Lumina Foundation for Education
- Mars
- McDonald's
- Medtronic
- Merck
- Microsoft
- MillerCoors
- National Association of Charter School Authorizers
- National Association of Water Companies
- National Board for Professional Teaching Standards
- PepsiCo
- Procter & Gamble
- Reed Elsevier
- Royal Dutch Shell
- SAP
- Scantron
- TicketMaster was a member as late as 2000; it later denied membership and threatened legal action if it was listed again
- Walgreens
- Walmart suspended membership May 31, 2012
- Wendy's
- Yelp
- Yahoo!

== See also ==
- List of members of the American Legislative Exchange Council
