= Clay Aurand =

American politician

Member of the Kansas House of Representatives from the 106th district
- In office January 9, 2017 – January 14, 2019
- Preceded by: Sharon Schwartz
- Succeeded by: Bill Pannbacker

Member of the Kansas House of Representatives from the 109th district
- In office January 9, 1995 – January 14, 2013
- Preceded by: Keith Roe
- Succeeded by: Troy Waymaster

Personal details
- Born: May 30, 1962 (age 64) Republic County, Kansas, U.S.
- Party: Republican
- Spouse: Gina Aurand
- Children: 4
- Education: Kansas State University
- Profession: Farmer

Clay Aurand (born May 30, 1962) is a former Republican member of the Kansas House of Representatives, representing the 109th district from 1995 to 2013.

A farmer and stockman from Belleville, Kansas, Aurand has a BS in political science from Kansas State University.

== Committee membership ==
- Education (Chair)
- Vision 2020
- Veterans, Military and Homeland Security
- Education Budget (Vice-Chair)

== Elections ==
=== 2012 ===
After redistricting for the 2012 elections, Aurand ran for House District 106. He lost to incumbent Sharon Schwartz in the August 7 Republican primary, by a margin of 2,456 to 2,368.

== Major donors ==
The top 6 donors to Aurand's 2008 campaign:

- 1. Koch Industries $1,000
- 2. Kansans for Lifesaving Cures $750
- 3. Ruffin, Phil $500
- 4. Kansas Chamber of Commerce $500
- 5. Kansas Medical Society $500
- 6. Wal-Mart $500

His total receipts were $15,201.
