= Tim Hodge (politician) =

American politician

Member of the Kansas House of Representatives from the 72nd district
- In office January 9, 2017 – January 11, 2021
- Preceded by: Marc Rhoades
- Succeeded by: Avery Anderson

Personal details
- Party: Democratic
- Spouse: Mary Ellen Hodge
- Education: Tabor College (BA); Washburn University (JD)

Tim Hodge is an American politician and attorney who served as a member of the Kansas House of Representatives from 2017 to 2021.

== Education ==
Hodge earned a Bachelor of Arts degree from Tabor College in 1999 and a Juris Doctor from Washburn Law School in 2003.

== Career ==
After earning his undergraduate degree, Hodge worked as a social studies teacher from 1999 to 2001. He previously served on the Newton Board of Education.

In 2016, Hodge challenged Republican Marc Rhoades for the district 72 seat in the Kansas House of Representatives, and won with 51.18% of the vote. When he ran for re-election in 2018, he faced Republican Steven Kelly, and won with 50.49% of the vote. He ran for re-election in 2020, but lost to Republican Avery Anderson.

=== Electoral record ===
2016 general election: Kansas House of Representatives, district 72
Party	Candidate	Votes	%
Democratic	Tim Hodge	4,963	51.18%
Republican	Marc Rhoades (incumbent)	4,735	48.82%
Total votes		9,698	100.00%
Democratic gain from Republican			

2018 general election: Kansas House of Representatives, district 72
Party	Candidate	Votes	%
Democratic	Tim Hodge (incumbent)	4,564	50.49%
Republican	Steven Kelly	4,476	49.51%
Total votes		9,040	100.00%
Democratic hold			

2020 general election: Kansas House of Representatives, district 72
Party	Candidate	Votes	%
Republican	Avery Anderson	6,159	54.92%
Democratic	Tim Hodge (incumbent)	5,056	45.08%
Total votes		11,215	100.00%
Republican gain from Democratic			
