= Curry Todd =

American politician (born 1947)

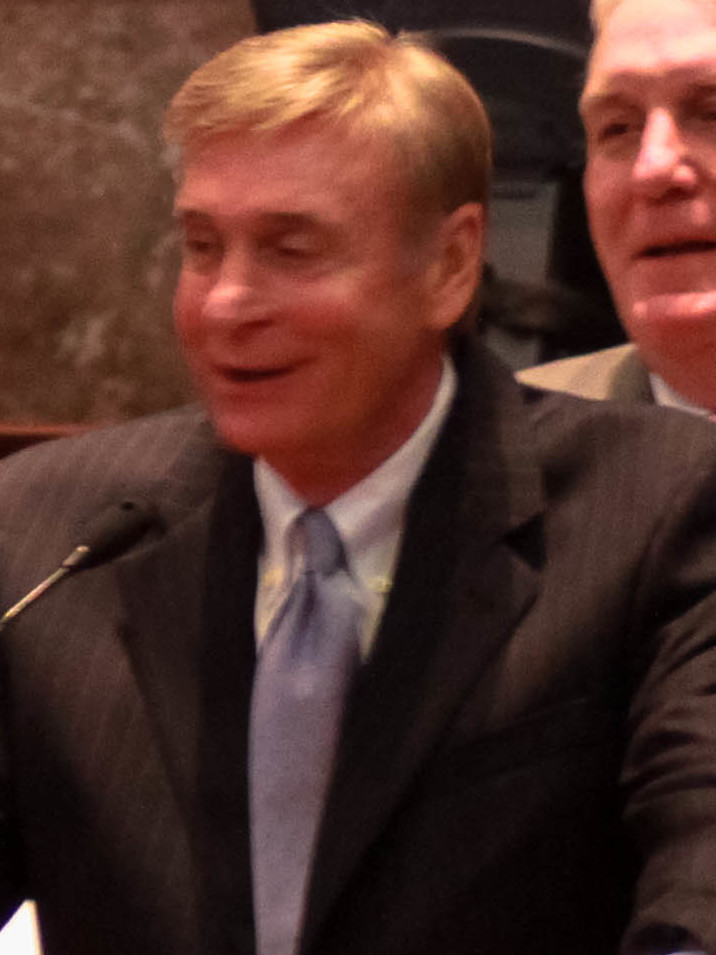
- Todd in 2014

Member of the Tennessee House of Representatives from the 95th district
- In office January 12, 1999 – January 10, 2017
- Preceded by: Ed Haley
- Succeeded by: Mark Lovell

Personal details
- Born: December 31, 1947 (age 78) Juno, Tennessee, U.S.
- Party: Republican
- Spouse: Divorced
- Children: 1
- Education: University of Memphis
- Website: House website

Curry Todd (born December 31, 1947) is an American politician who served from 1999 to 2017 as a Republican member of the Tennessee House of Representatives for the 95th District, encompassing part of Shelby County.

== Biography ==
Todd was born on December 31, 1947, in Juno, Tennessee. He is a graduate of the University of Memphis.

He also served as state chairman and was a member of the board of directors of the American Legislative Exchange Council (ALEC), a national association of legislators. He worked as a police officer in Memphis.

He is divorced with one child. He is a Baptist.

In 2010, he compared pregnant illegal immigrants to "reproducing rats". He later apologized for his comments.

=== Arrest ===
In October 2011, Todd was arrested with a DUI. He apologized to Gov. Bill Haslam. A few days later, he resigned from his chairmanship of the State and Local Government Committee. Chip Forrester, the Chair of the Tennessee Democratic Party, called for his resignation.

He pled guilty to DUI and possessing a loaded firearm. He was sentenced to 48 hours in jail, one year of probation, fined, given community service, alcohol training, an alcohol car locking device and ordered to participate in MADD treatments.

=== Second Arrest ===
In 2016, Todd was arrested for stealing campaign signs supporting his opponent, Mark Lovell. Lovell posted Todd's $100 bond.
