= Tess Teague =

American politician (born 1990)

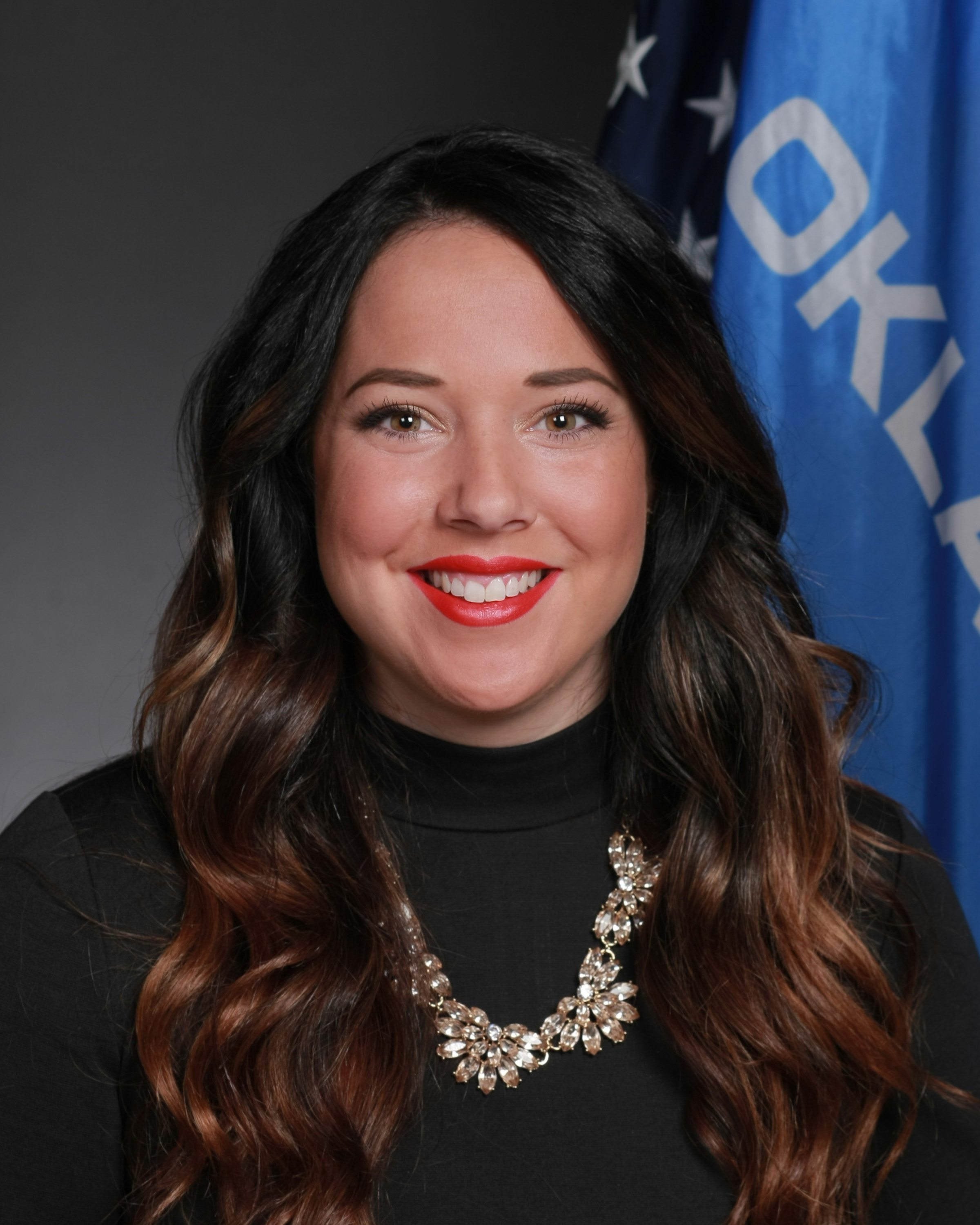

Member of the Oklahoma House of Representatives from the 101st district
- In office November 17, 2016 – November 15, 2018
- Preceded by: Gary Banz
- Succeeded by: Robert Manger

Personal details
- Born: May 3, 1990 (age 36) Choctaw, Oklahoma
- Party: Republican

Tess Teague (born May 3, 1990) is an American politician who served in the Oklahoma House of Representatives from the 101st district from 2016 to 2018.

On August 28, 2018, she was defeated in the Republican primary for the 101st district.
