= Robert Manger =

American politician

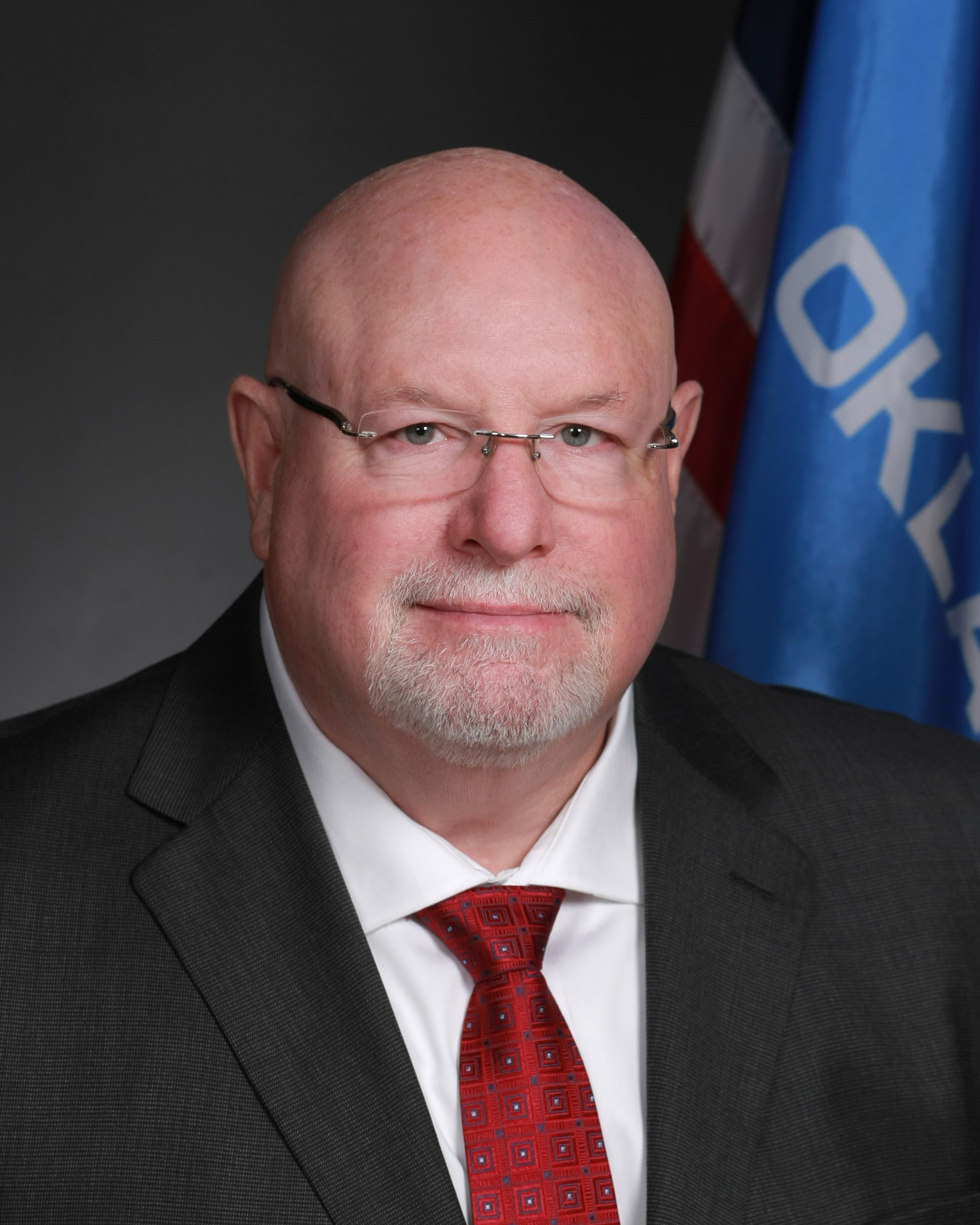

Member of the Oklahoma House of Representatives from the 101st district
- Incumbent
- Assumed office November 15, 2018
- Preceded by: Tess Teague

Personal details
- Born: December 3, 1956 (age 69)
- Party: Republican

Robert Manger (born December 3, 1956) is an American politician who has served in the Oklahoma House of Representatives from the 101st district since 2018. His current term ends on November 18, 2026.

== Oklahoma House of Representatives ==
In 2024, a representative of the organization Oklahoma Appleseed called a bill Robert Manger co-authored with Julie Daniels one of their "Bad Bills." HB 3566 adds "'aggravated eluding' to the list of youthful offender offenses. Oklahoma has 20 youthful offender eligible offenses. These are crimes that can be committed by someone under 18 that allow them to be 'bridged' into the adult system." This is in direct contrast to the mandate sent "to lawmakers in 2016 to lower incarceration rates safely" under the vote of the people.

== Personal life ==
Robert Manger is a retired law enforcement officer and has "worked as a Realtor in the Oklahoma City Metro area." He is a "graduate of Del City High School, holds a Bachelor of Arts degree in Criminal Justice from the University of Central Oklahoma and an Associate of Arts degree in Sociology from Rose State College." He and his wife, Karlita,"have been married 35 years and have lived in the same home in District 101 for the past 24 years." They are also members of the Southern Hills Baptist Church and life members of the National Rifle Association of America.
