= Troy Waymaster =

American politician

Member of the Kansas House of Representatives from the 109th district
- Incumbent
- Assumed office January 14, 2013
- Preceded by: Clay Aurand

Personal details
- Party: Republican
- Spouse: Crystal
- Children: 1
- Education: University of Kansas

Troy L. Waymaster is an American politician from the state of Kansas. A Republican, Waymaster is a member of the Kansas House of Representatives. He has represented the 109th district since 2013.

Waymaster graduated from Russell High School in Russell, Kansas, in 1996, and from the University of Kansas in 2000. He attended business school at Fort Hays State University, but did not complete his studies. He was elected to the Kansas House in the 2012 elections. Waymaster ran for the United States House of Representatives in Kansas's 1st congressional district in the 2020 elections. On May 23, 2020, Waymaster ended his Congressional campaign and announced that he would seek reelection to the Kansas House of Representatives.

Waymaster and his wife, Crystal, have a son named Christian and live near Bunker Hill, Kansas.
