= Linson =

Linson is a surname. Notable people with the surname include:

- Art Linson (born 1942), American film producer, director, and screenwriter
- John J. Linson (1850–1915), American lawyer and politician
- John Linson, American film and television producer

== See also ==
- Hinson (surname)
