= Gary Hayzlett =

American politician

Member of the Kansas House of Representatives from the 122nd district
- In office January 14, 1991 – January 14, 2013
- Preceded by: Harold Guldner
- Succeeded by: Russell Jennings

Personal details
- Born: September 4, 1941 (age 84) Lakin, Kansas, U.S.
- Party: Republican
- Spouse: Helen
- Children: 3

Gary Hayzlett (September 4, 1941) is a former member of the Kansas House of Representatives, who represented the 122nd district from 1991 to 2013.

== Major donors ==
The top 5 donors to Hayzlett's 2008 campaign:

- 1. Kansas Contractors Assoc $1,000
- 2. Walmart $500
- 3. Kan Chamber of Commerce $500
- 4. Heavy Constructors Assoc $500
- 5. Heavy Const Assoc $500
