= Russell Jennings =

American politician (1955–2021)

Russ Jennings

Member of the Kansas House of Representatives from the 122nd district
- In office January 14, 2013 – October 27, 2021
- Preceded by: Gary Hayzlett
- Succeeded by: TBD

Personal details
- Born: May 23, 1955 Buffalo, New York, U.S.
- Died: October 27, 2021 (aged 66)
- Party: Republican
- Spouse: Judy
- Children: 4
- Education: Friends University (BS)

J. Russell "Russ" Jennings (May 23, 1955 – October 27, 2021) was an American politician who served as a member of the Kansas House of Representatives from the 122nd district. Elected in 2012, he assumed office in 2013 and remained in post until his death in 2021.

== Early life and education ==
Jennings was born in Buffalo, NY. He raised his family in Lakin, Kansas. He earned a Bachelor of Science degree in human resource management and criminal justice from Friends University.

In 1981, Jennings attended the University of Nevada at Reno National Judicial College and was a Graduate in Limited Jurisdiction General, Alcohol Drugs and the Courts, Contracts and Damages. He became the District Magistrate Judge for the State of Kansas-Judicial Branch for Kearny County District Court. He took classes at Garden City Community College and then graduated from Friends University in Wichita, Kansas, with his Bachelor of Science Undergraduate Degree with highest honors in Human Resource Management.

== Career ==
Jennings served as the director of the Finney County Southwest Regional Juvenile Justice Authority and worked on Governor Mark Parkinson's cabinet transition before becoming a self-employed government contractor. In the 2012 election for district 122 in the Kansas House of Representatives, Jennings defeated Randy Hayzlett in the Republican primary and ran unopposed in the November general election. He assumed office in 2013.

Jennings graduated from Kenmore West High School in Tonawanda, New York and the Spartan School of Aeronautics at Tulsa, Oklahoma. He went to work at the Stanton County airport in Johnson, Kansas as a mechanic and pilot. In 1977 he was a Graduate of General Law Enforcement Officer Training & Police Management from the Kansas Law Enforcement Training Center in Hutchinson, Kansas and became a Deputy Sheriff and later Undersheriff for the Kearny County Sheriff Department in Kearny County, Kansas.

At this time, Jennings became the Director of the Southwest Kansas Regional Juvenile Detention Center in Garden City, Kansas.

In 2011, Jennings accepted the position of Commissioner of Juvenile Justice for the Kansas Juvenile Justice Authority under Governors Kathleen Sebelius and Mark Parkinson. In the election of 2012, he was elected as State Representative of the 122nd District and currently was serving his 5th term. Russ was well known for his work on corrections and juvenile justice issues and has been the Chair of the House Corrections Committee for the last 3 sessions. During this time, he also has been a Contract Consultant for Performance-based Standards of Braintree, Massachusetts.

Jennings was involved in local and state boards and committees starting in 1979 as a Member of the Board of Governors of the Kansas Peace Officers Association. He served 3 years as an Appointee of the Kansas Corrections Ombudsman Board, 13 years as Legislative Committee Chairman, Education Committee Chairman, and later vice-president and President of the Kansas District Magistrate Judges Association. For 11 years, Jennings was a Criminal Justice Advisory Board Member at Garden City Community College and 2 years as Juvenile Justice Committee Chairman and member of the Kansas Corrections Association. In 1996 he was appointed by Chief Justice Kay McFarland as a member of the Juvenile Intake and Assessment Advisory Committee for the Kansas Supreme Court.

Jennings served 8 years on the Lakin City Council from 1997 to 2005. In 1997, Governor Bill Graves appointed him as a board member of both the Kansas Advisory Group on Juvenile Justice and Delinquency and the Kansas Youth Authority Board.

Jennings became very involved with Leadership Kansas through the Kansas Chamber of Commerce and Industry and was a 1998 Graduate of the program. From 2002 to 2009, he served as State Program Director, Board of Trustees member and chairman of the board of trustees.

Jennings also served the State of Kansas as a board member of the Kansas Sex Offender Policy Board, Kansas Substance Abuse Policy Board and Kansas Criminal Justice Coordinating Council. He served as a board member of the Criminal Justice Advisory Board at Washburn University.

Jennings was the 2009 Distinguished Service to Kansas Children Award honoree of the Kansas Children's Service League, the 2009 Outstanding Administrator Award honoree of the Council of Juvenile Corrections Administrators. In 2010 he was named Kansas Alumnus of the Year for Leadership Kansas.

== Personal life ==
When he wasn't working, Jennings spent time at his beloved lake house at Kanopolis Lake fishing and spending quality time with his family. Jennings also enjoyed spending countless hours tending to his lawn to ensure it was in pristine condition.
