= Avery Anderson =

Kansas, United States state politician

Member of the Kansas House of Representatives from the 72nd district
- Incumbent
- Assumed office January 11, 2021
- Preceded by: Tim Hodge

Personal details
- Born: 1997 (age 28–29) Newton, Kansas
- Party: Republican
- Education: University of Kansas (BS)

Avery Anderson (born 1997) is an American politician serving as a member of the Kansas House of Representatives from the 72nd district. Elected in November 2020, he assumed office on January 11, 2021.

== Early life and education ==
A native of Newton, Kansas, Anderson earned a Bachelor of Science degree in political science and government from the University of Kansas in 2019.

== Career ==
In 2018, Anderson worked as an intern in the Kansas Legislature. In the summer of 2019, he interned in the Sedgwick County District Attorney's Office. From January to May 2020, Anderson served as an intern in the U.S. Senate office of Pat Roberts.

2021-2022 Kansas House of Representatives Committee Assignments

- Financial Institutions and Rural Development
- General Government Budget
- Commerce, Labor and Economic Development
- Energy, Utilities and Telecommunications
