= David Frizzell (politician) =

American politician from Indiana

Member of the Indiana House of Representatives from the 93rd district
- In office 1992 – April 24, 2019
- Preceded by: L. Keith Bulen
- Succeeded by: Dollyne Sherman

Personal details
- Born: January 17, 1950 (age 76) Baltimore, Maryland
- Party: Republican
- Spouse: Valda Frizzell
- Education: Loyola College
- Occupation: Consultant, National Guard Association of Indiana

David Nason Frizzell was an American politician from Indiana. Frizzell was a Republican member of the Indiana House of Representatives for District 93.

== Early life ==
On January 17, 1950, Frizzell was born in Baltimore, Maryland.

== Education ==
In 1973, Frizzell earned a Bachelor of Arts degree from Loyola College, Maryland.

== Career ==
Frizzell was a Republican member of the Indiana House of Representatives for District 93 from 1992 to 2019. Frizzell was the Assistant Majority Floor Leader for the Indiana House of Representatives since 2014.

In April 2019, Frizzell resigned as a member of Indiana House of Representatives for District 93.

Dollyne Sherman was elected to complete the remaining term.

== Personal life ==
Frizzell's wife is Valda Frizzell. They have two children. Frizzell and his family live in Indianapolis, Indiana.
