= Lakin, Kansas =

City in Kearny County, Kansas

- City and County seat
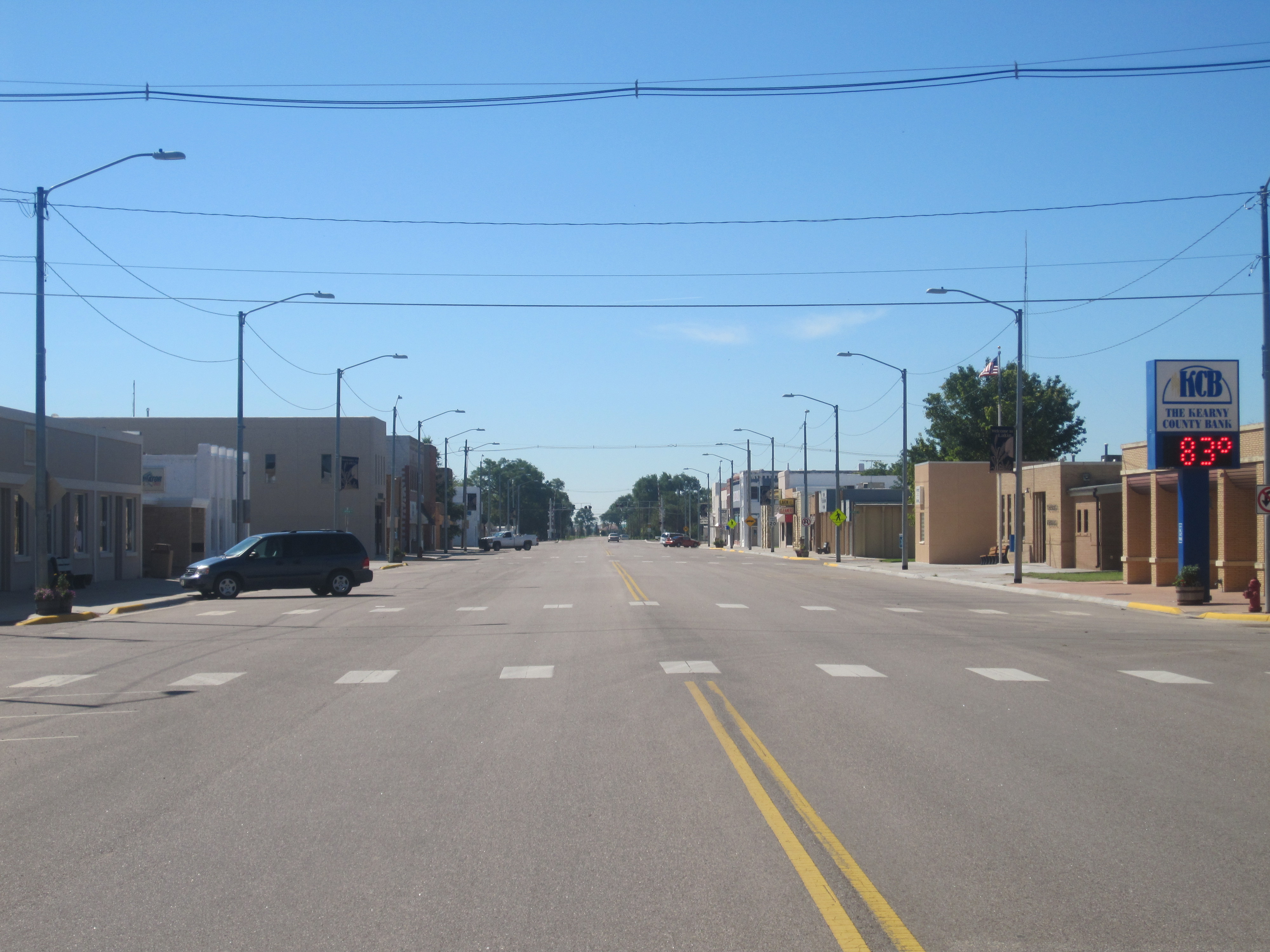
- Downtown Lakin (2010)

- Location within Kearny County (left) and Kansas (right)

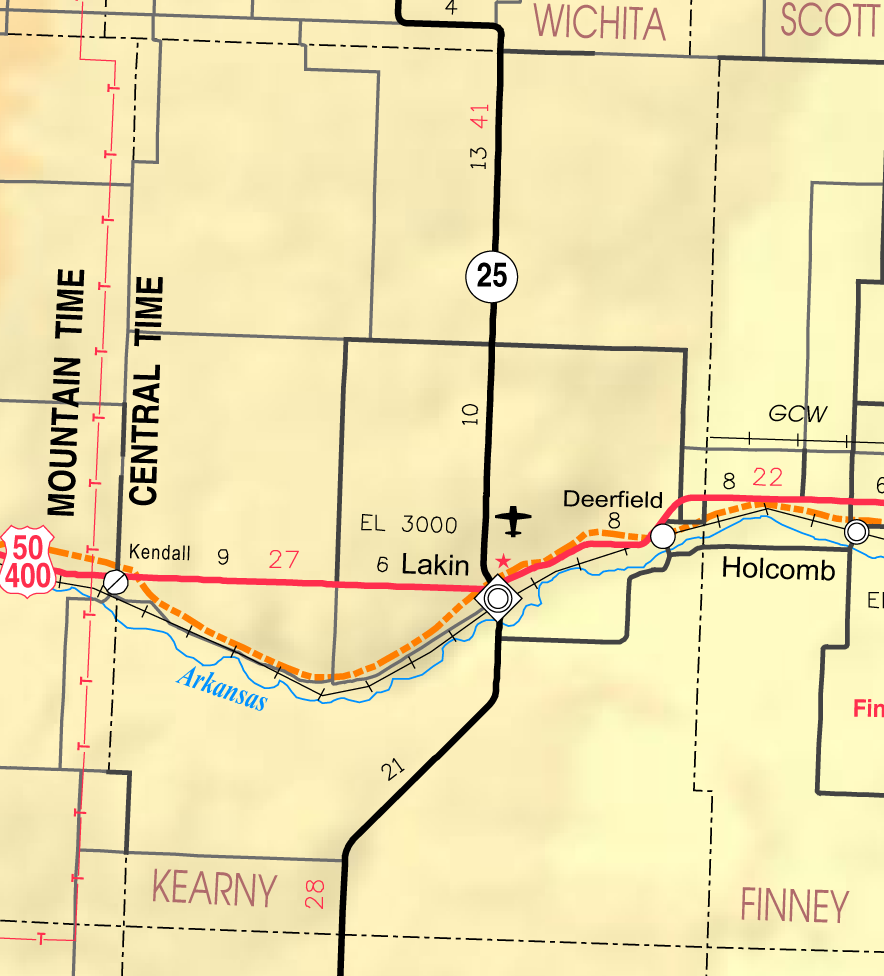
- KDOT map of Kearny County (legend)
- Coordinates: 37°56′25″N 101°15′30″W
- Country: United States
- State: Kansas
- County: Kearny
- Founded: 1874
- Incorporated: 1888
- Named for: David Lakin

Area
  - Total: 0.95 sq mi (2.45 km^{2})
  - Land: 0.95 sq mi (2.45 km^{2})
  - Water: 0 sq mi (0.00 km^{2})
- Elevation: 3,005 ft (916 m)

Population (2020)
  - Total: 2,205
  - Density: 2,330/sq mi (900/km^{2})
- Time zone: UTC-6 (CST)
  - Summer (DST): UTC-5 (CDT)
- ZIP Code: 67860
- Area code: 620
- FIPS code: 20-38175
- GNIS ID: 2395615
- Website: lakinkansas.org

Lakin is a city in and the county seat of Kearny County, Kansas, United States. As of the 2020 census, the population of the city was 2,205. It is located along US 50/US 400.

== History ==
In spring 1873, John O'Loughlin, community founder, set up a trading post next to the newly completed Atchison, Topeka and Santa Fe Railway. The community was named by the AT&SF for David Long Lakin, former treasurer of the AT&SF. Lakin was designated county seat in 1888. A post office has been in operation in Lakin since March 1874.

== Geography ==
According to the United States Census Bureau, the city has a total area of 0.98 square miles (2.54 km^{2}), all land.

=== Climate ===
According to the Köppen Climate Classification system, Lakin has a cold semi-arid climate, abbreviated "BSk" on climate maps. The hottest temperature recorded in Lakin was 115 °F (46.1 °C) on August 7 and August 9, 1896, while the coldest temperature recorded was −23 °F (−30.6 °C) on January 12, 1942.

Climate data for Lakin, Kansas, 1991–2020 normals, extremes 1893–present
Month	Jan	Feb	Mar	Apr	May	Jun	Jul	Aug	Sep	Oct	Nov	Dec	Year
Record high °F (°C)	80 (27)	90 (32)	98 (37)	100 (38)	107 (42)	114 (46)	113 (45)	115 (46)	111 (44)	100 (38)	92 (33)	85 (29)	115 (46)
Mean maximum °F (°C)	68.7 (20.4)	75.5 (24.2)	84.2 (29.0)	90.8 (32.7)	97.5 (36.4)	103.3 (39.6)	105.8 (41.0)	103.3 (39.6)	100.3 (37.9)	93.3 (34.1)	79.0 (26.1)	68.7 (20.4)	106.6 (41.4)
Mean daily maximum °F (°C)	46.1 (7.8)	50.0 (10.0)	59.6 (15.3)	68.4 (20.2)	78.7 (25.9)	89.6 (32.0)	94.3 (34.6)	91.8 (33.2)	84.5 (29.2)	71.4 (21.9)	57.5 (14.2)	47.0 (8.3)	69.9 (21.1)
Daily mean °F (°C)	32.9 (0.5)	36.2 (2.3)	44.8 (7.1)	53.6 (12.0)	64.3 (17.9)	75.1 (23.9)	80.1 (26.7)	77.9 (25.5)	70.0 (21.1)	56.6 (13.7)	43.3 (6.3)	33.9 (1.1)	55.7 (13.2)
Mean daily minimum °F (°C)	19.8 (−6.8)	22.4 (−5.3)	30.0 (−1.1)	38.7 (3.7)	49.9 (9.9)	60.5 (15.8)	65.8 (18.8)	63.9 (17.7)	55.4 (13.0)	41.9 (5.5)	29.0 (−1.7)	20.9 (−6.2)	41.5 (5.3)
Mean minimum °F (°C)	3.0 (−16.1)	6.7 (−14.1)	13.9 (−10.1)	24.4 (−4.2)	36.4 (2.4)	48.9 (9.4)	57.7 (14.3)	55.4 (13.0)	42.0 (5.6)	26.3 (−3.2)	13.0 (−10.6)	4.0 (−15.6)	−2.9 (−19.4)
Record low °F (°C)	−23 (−31)	−20 (−29)	−20 (−29)	8 (−13)	12 (−11)	30 (−1)	42 (6)	37 (3)	24 (−4)	5 (−15)	−7 (−22)	−18 (−28)	−23 (−31)
Average precipitation inches (mm)	0.39 (9.9)	0.39 (9.9)	0.97 (25)	1.57 (40)	2.36 (60)	3.27 (83)	2.81 (71)	2.86 (73)	1.30 (33)	1.64 (42)	0.58 (15)	0.67 (17)	18.81 (478.8)
Average snowfall inches (cm)	5.0 (13)	3.4 (8.6)	3.4 (8.6)	1.4 (3.6)	0.2 (0.51)	0.0 (0.0)	0.0 (0.0)	0.0 (0.0)	0.0 (0.0)	0.7 (1.8)	1.1 (2.8)	4.2 (11)	19.4 (49.91)
Average precipitation days (≥ 0.01 in)	2.5	2.9	4.1	5.6	7.2	7.5	7.6	6.8	4.1	4.0	2.9	3.0	58.2
Average snowy days (≥ 0.1 in)	1.8	1.7	1.2	0.4	0.1	0.0	0.0	0.0	0.0	0.2	0.6	1.6	7.6
Source 1: NOAA
Source 2: National Weather Service

== Demographics ==
Historical population
Census	Pop.	Note	%±
1890	258		—
1900	259		0.4%
1910	337		30.1%
1920	556		65.0%
1930	739		32.9%
1940	709		−4.1%
1950	1,618		128.2%
1960	1,432		−11.5%
1970	1,570		9.6%
1980	1,823		16.1%
1990	2,060		13.0%
2000	2,316		12.4%
2010	2,216		−4.3%
2020	2,205		−0.5%
U.S. Decennial Census

=== 2020 census ===
As of the 2020 census, there were 2,205 people, 796 households, and 555 families in Lakin. The population density was 2,330.9 per square mile (899.9/km^{2}). There were 860 housing units at an average density of 909.1 per square mile (351.0/km^{2}).

The median age was 34.8 years. The age distribution was 28.6% under 18, 7.6% from 18 to 24, 26.3% from 25 to 44, 21.9% from 45 to 64, and 15.6% age 65 or older. For every 100 females there were 97.6 males, and for every 100 females age 18 and over there were 91.5 males. Of the 796 households, 39.1% had children under age 18, 53.9% were married-couple households, 16.7% had a male householder with no spouse or partner present, and 21.9% had a female householder with no spouse or partner present. About 23.7% of households were made up of individuals, and 11.1% had someone living alone who was 65 years of age or older. There were 860 housing units, of which 7.4% were vacant; the homeowner vacancy rate was 1.8% and the rental vacancy rate was 8.5%.

0.0% of residents lived in urban areas, while 100.0% lived in rural areas.

Racial composition as of the 2020 census
Race	Number	Percent
White	1,412	64.0%
Black or African American	26	1.2%
American Indian and Alaska Native	18	0.8%
Asian	4	0.2%
Native Hawaiian and Other Pacific Islander	0	0.0%
Some other race	243	11.0%
Two or more races	502	22.8%
Hispanic or Latino (of any race)	815	37.0%

Among residents, 56.69% were non-Hispanic white.

Households and housing

The average household size was 2.4 and the average family size was 3.0.

Education

The percent of those with a bachelor's degree or higher was estimated to be 4.4% of the population.

Income and poverty

The 2016–2020 5-year American Community Survey estimates show that the median household income was $43,281 (with a margin of error of +/- $8,724) and the median family income was $44,031 (+/- $8,994). Males had a median income of $30,142 (+/- $7,478) versus $30,385 (+/- $14,221) for females. The median income for those above 16 years old was $30,232 (+/- $6,288). Approximately, 12.7% of families and 22.5% of the population were below the poverty line, including 58.8% of those under the age of 18 and 13.1% of those ages 65 or over.

=== 2010 census ===
As of the census of 2010, there were 2,216 people, 781 households, and 573 families residing in the city. The population density was 2,261.2 inhabitants per square mile (873.1/km^{2}). There were 851 housing units at an average density of 868.4 per square mile (335.3/km^{2}). The racial makeup of the city was 87.7% White, 0.3% African American, 0.9% Native American, 8.7% from other races, and 2.4% from two or more races. Hispanic or Latino of any race were 28.9% of the population.

There were 781 households, of which 43.0% had children under the age of 18 living with them, 54.9% were married couples living together, 11.8% had a female householder with no husband present, 6.7% had a male householder with no wife present, and 26.6% were non-families. 24.2% of all households were made up of individuals, and 11.2% had someone living alone who was 65 years of age or older. The average household size was 2.73 and the average family size was 3.23.

The median age in the city was 34.5 years. 30.1% of residents were under the age of 18; 8.8% were between the ages of 18 and 24; 23.1% were from 25 to 44; 23.6% were from 45 to 64; and 14.5% were 65 years of age or older. The gender makeup of the city was 50.6% male and 49.4% female.

== Education ==
The community is served by Lakin USD 215 public school district.

== Notable people ==
- Frank Luther (1899–1980), country music singer
- Russ Jennings, member of the Kansas House of Representatives

== Gallery ==
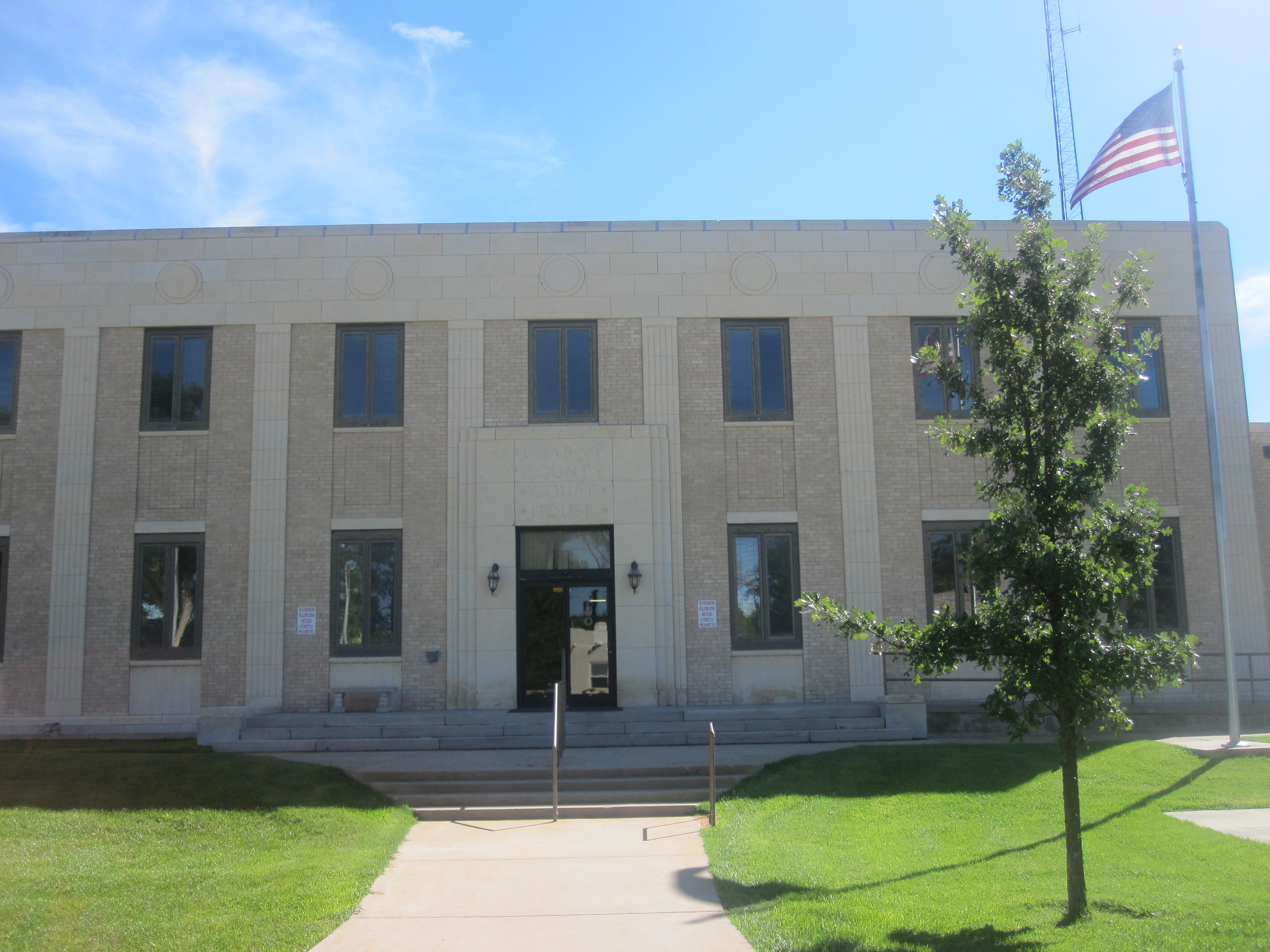
Kearny County Courthouse (2010)

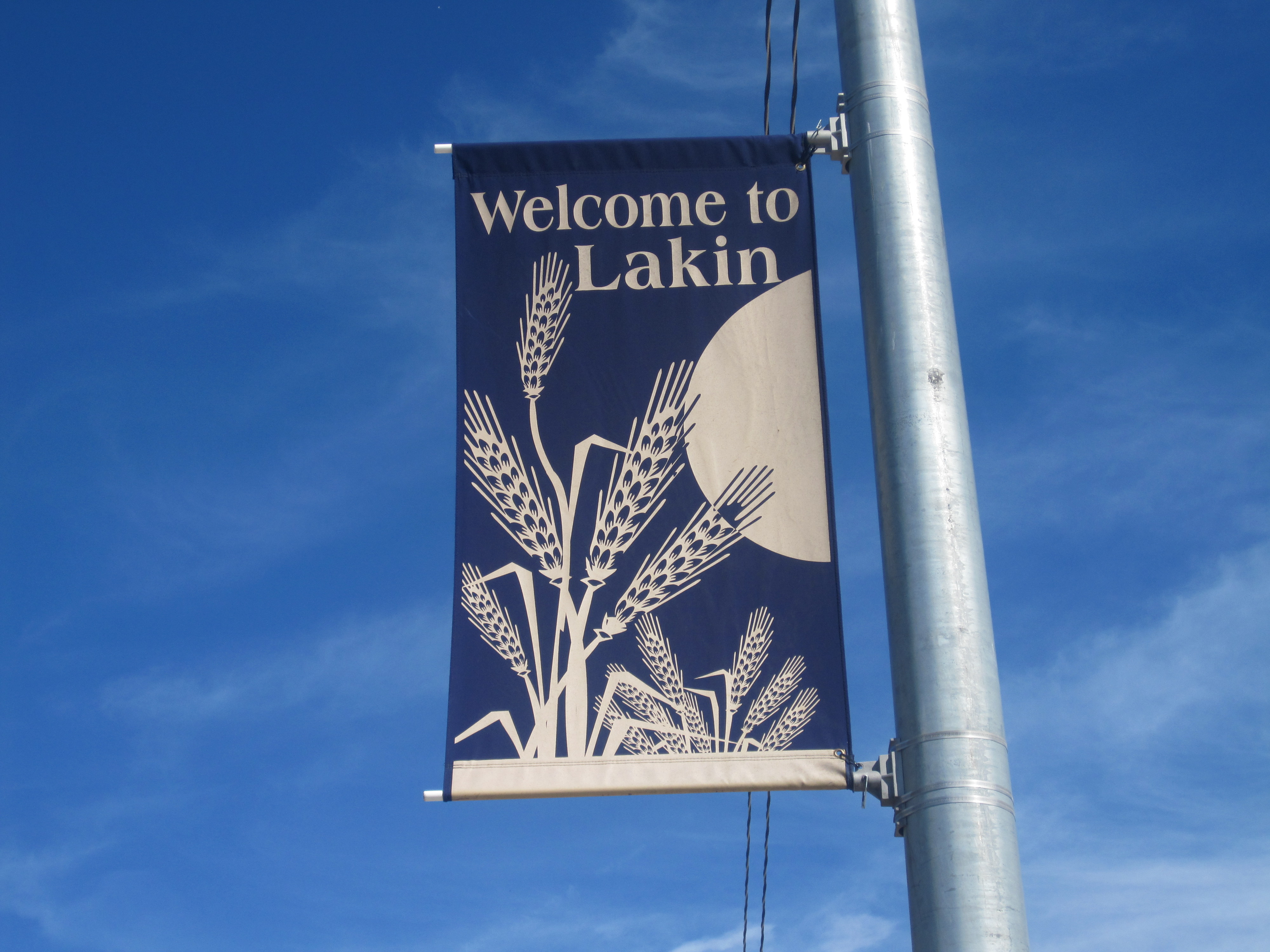
Lakin welcome sign

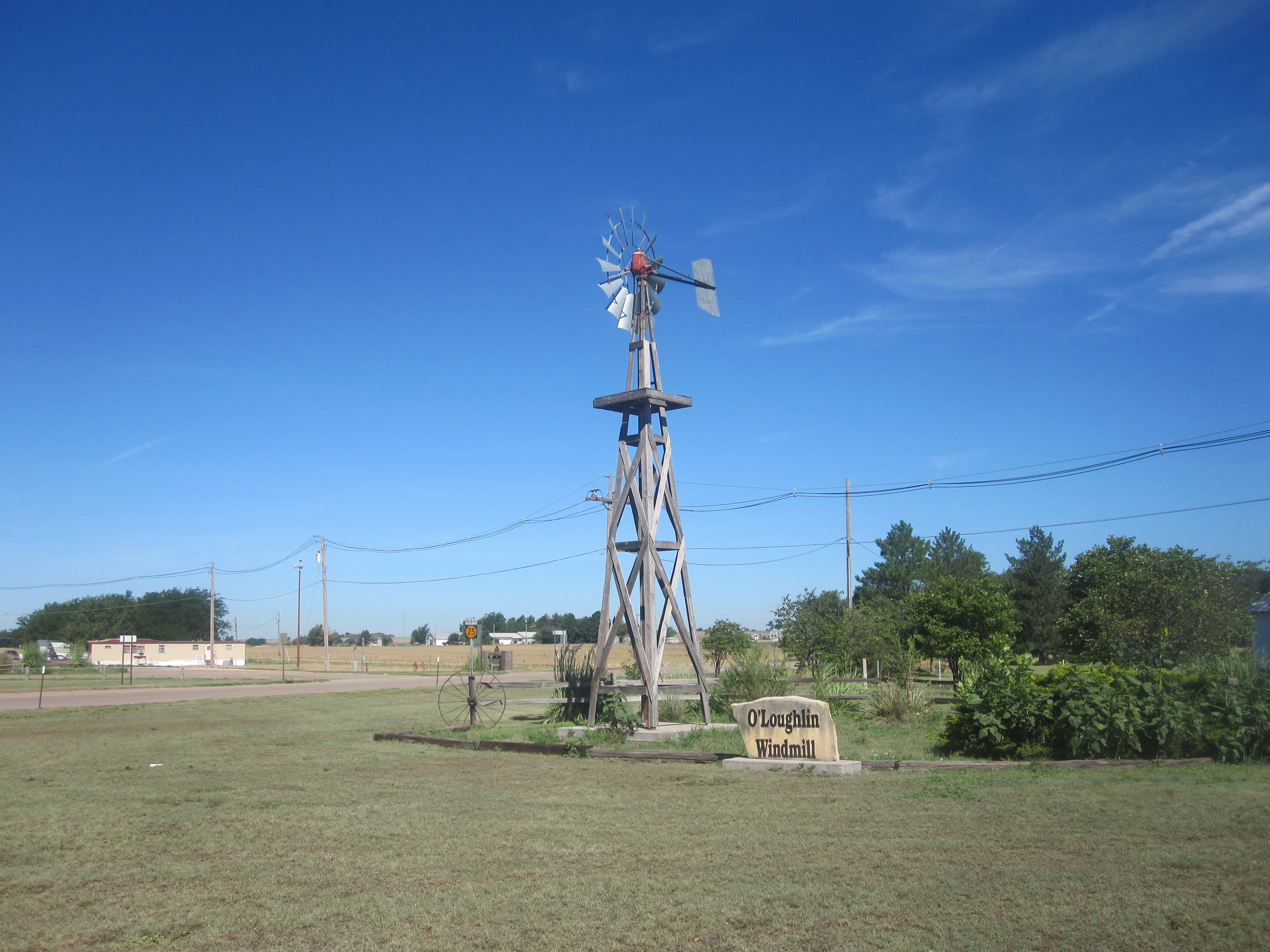
O'Loughlin Windmill in Lakin

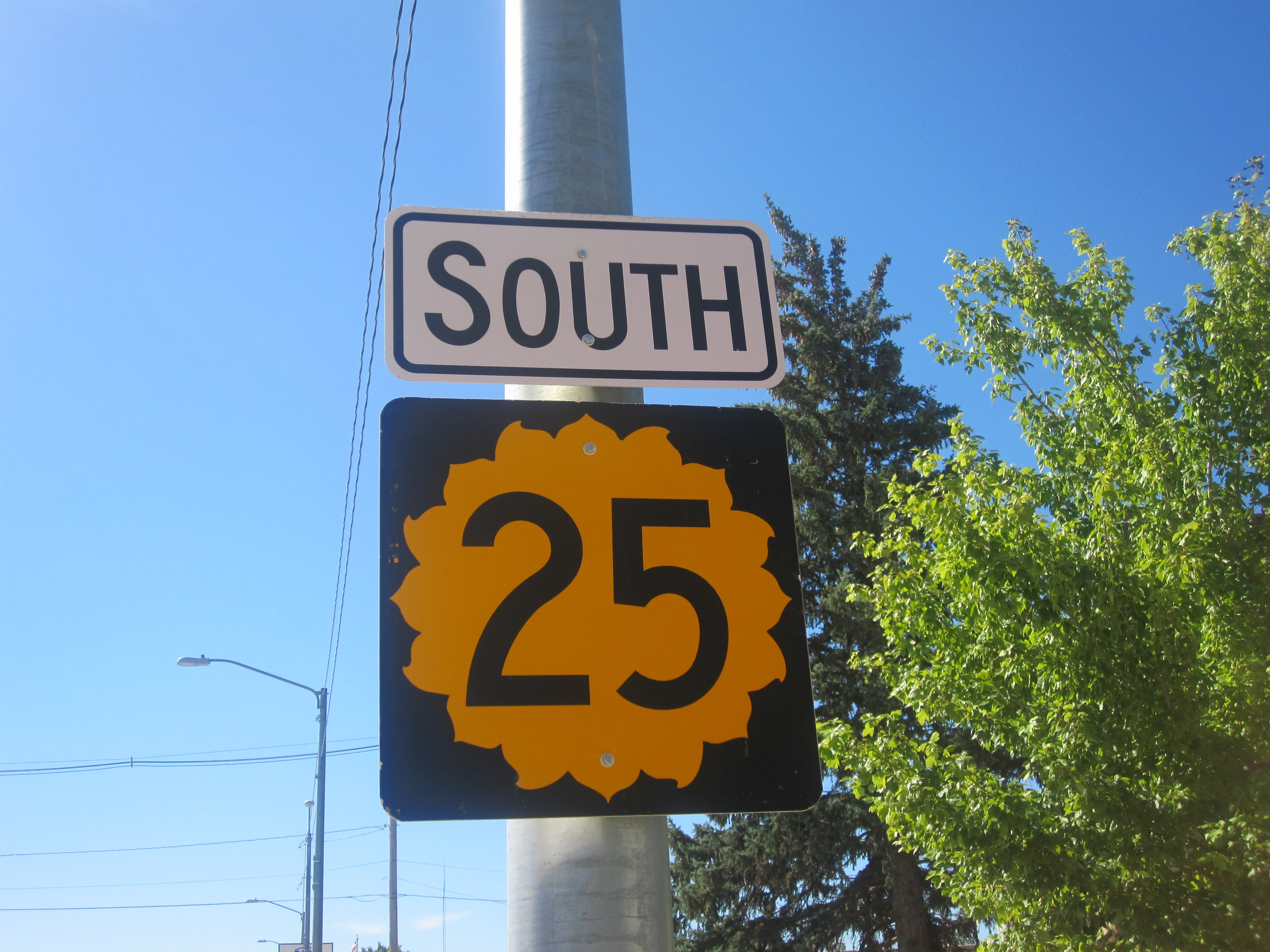
Kansas Highway 25 runs through Lakin

== See also ==
- Santa Fe Trail
- List of battles fought in Kansas
