= Gary Banz =

American educator and politician

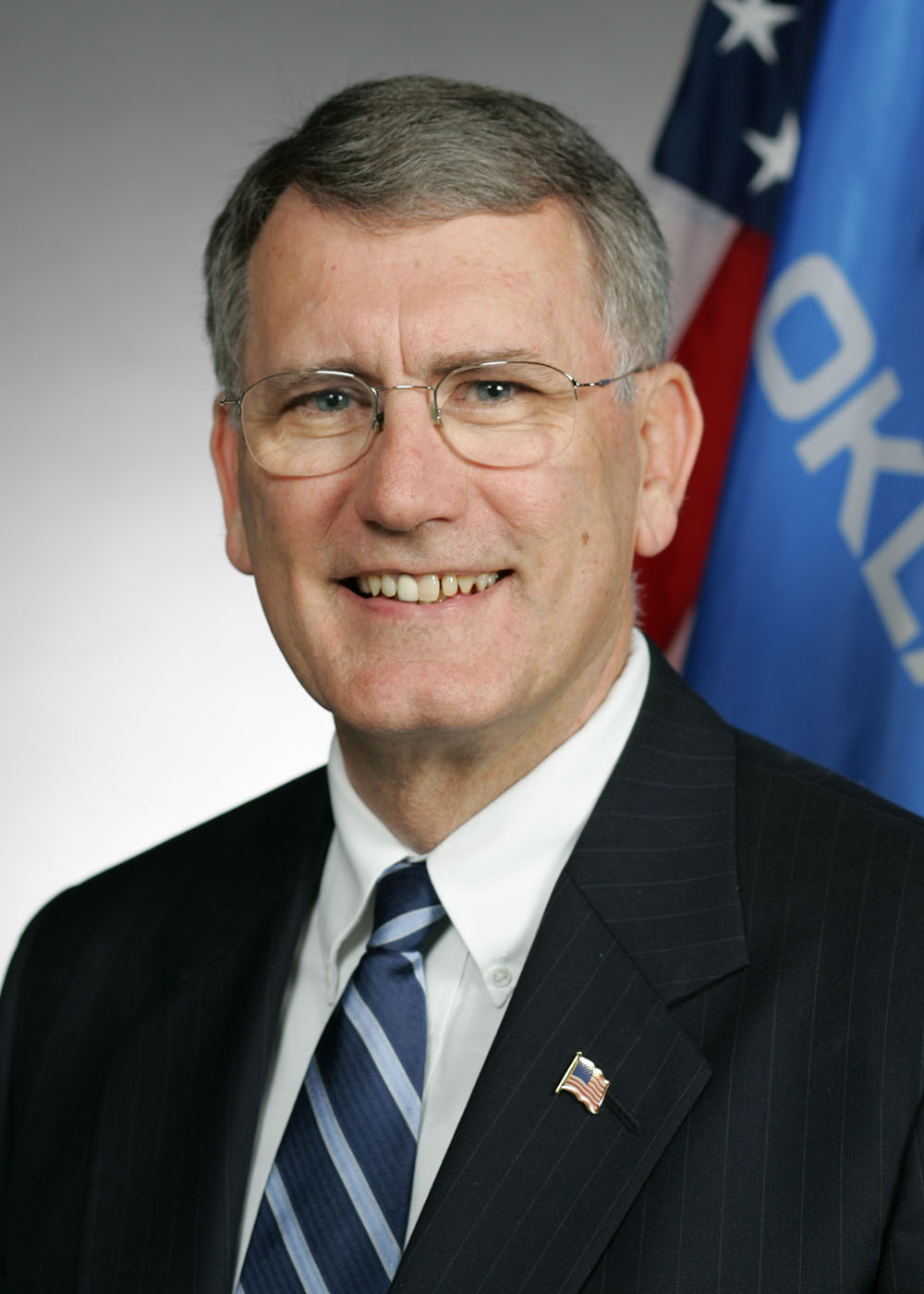

Member of the Oklahoma House of Representatives from the 101st district
- In office 2004–2016
- Preceded by: Forrest Claunch
- Succeeded by: Tess Teague

Personal details
- Born: 7 December 1945 (age 80) Sylvia, Kansas
- Party: Republican
- Spouse: Linda
- Education: University of Central Oklahoma, Southern Nazarene University
- Occupation: Retired Teacher, Politician

Gary Banz (born December 7, 1945) is a retired American educator and former Republican politician from the U.S. state of Oklahoma. He served as a majority whip of the Oklahoma House of Representatives and as Oklahoma state leader besides national secretary of the American Legislative Exchange Council (ALEC).

Banz was the author of a bill to reduce the number of state lawmakers.

== Early life ==
Banz was born December 7, 1945, in Sylvia, Kansas. He joined the United States Army in June 1968 and served until January 1970. He was awarded the Army Commendation Medal on March 19, 1970. He also served in the United States Army Reserve from December 1982 until September 1990. He was awarded the Army Achievement Medal on May 7, 1985.

Banz married Linda and had three children who graduated from Midwest City High School. Banz taught in various Oklahoma school districts before retiring and eventually running for office.

== Political career ==
Banz was first elected to House District 101 with no Democratic opposition in 2004. However, he did face two primary opponents, Jeremy Sellers and Todd Dealy. He faced no opposition in 2006. In 2008, he defeated Democratic challenger Donnie Lewis. In 2012, he defeated Democratic challenger Stephen Covert.

Banz proposed House Joint Resolution 1021, which seeks to reduce the size of the Oklahoma Legislature by cutting the number of lawmakers. The legislation was not enacted during the 2012 legislative session, but would have put a state question on the November 2012 ballot. If approved by voters, it would have been implemented in 2021.
