= Blair Thoreson =

American politician

Member of the North Dakota House of Representatives from the 44th district
- In office 1998 - 2016 Serving with Don Clark, Joshua Boschee

Personal details
- Born: May 6, 1964 (age 62) Fargo, North Dakota, U.S.
- Party: North Dakota Republican Party
- Spouse: Jennifer
- Education: North Dakota State University Bachelors-Communications University of Mary Masters-Management
- Profession: Government relations

Blair Thoreson (born May 6, 1964) is an American former politician. He served as a North Dakota Republican Party member of the North Dakota House of Representatives, representing the 44th Legislative District in Fargo from 1998 to 2016.

== Biography ==
=== Early life and education ===
Blair Thoreson was born in Fargo, North Dakota. He received a bachelor's degree in communications from the North Dakota State University and a master's degree in management from the University of Mary.

=== Career ===
Thoreson spent 14 years employed in the telecommunications sector.

From 1998 to 2016 he served as a Republican state representative for North Dakota, representing the 44th Legislative District in Fargo He served as chairman of the House Appropriations - Government Operations committee. Additionally, he served on the Administrative Rules, Budget Section, and Information Technology committees.

Thoreson is employed in government relations and regulatory affairs with Primacy Strategy Group, based in St. Paul, Minnesota with offices in Bismarck, North Dakota and Washington, DC.

=== Personal life ===
Thoreson is married to Jennifer Thoreson, and they have two children. They reside in Fargo, where they attend the First Lutheran Church.
