= Gary MacLaren =

American politician

Member of the Montana House of Representatives from the 89 district
- In office 2004 to 2012

Personal details
- Born: March 28, 1942 (age 84)
- Party: Republican
- Education: University of California, Berkeley

Gary MacLaren is a Republican member of the Montana Legislature. He was elected to House District 89 which represents a portion of the Ravalli County area.
