= Dwight Wrangham =

American politician

Member of the North Dakota House of Representatives from the 8th district
- In office December 1, 2000 – December 1, 2012
- Succeeded by: Vernon R. Laning

Personal details
- Party: Republican

Dwight Wrangham is an American politician who served in the North Dakota House of Representatives from the 8th district from 2000 to 2012.
