= Juno, Tennessee =

Unincorporated community in Tennessee, US

Coordinates: 35°41′53″N 88°31′14″W

Juno is an unincorporated community in Henderson County, in the U.S. state of Tennessee.

== History ==
Juno was founded ca. 1846. A post office called Juno was established in 1847, and remained in operation until 1957.
