= Sharon Schwartz =

American politician (born 1940)

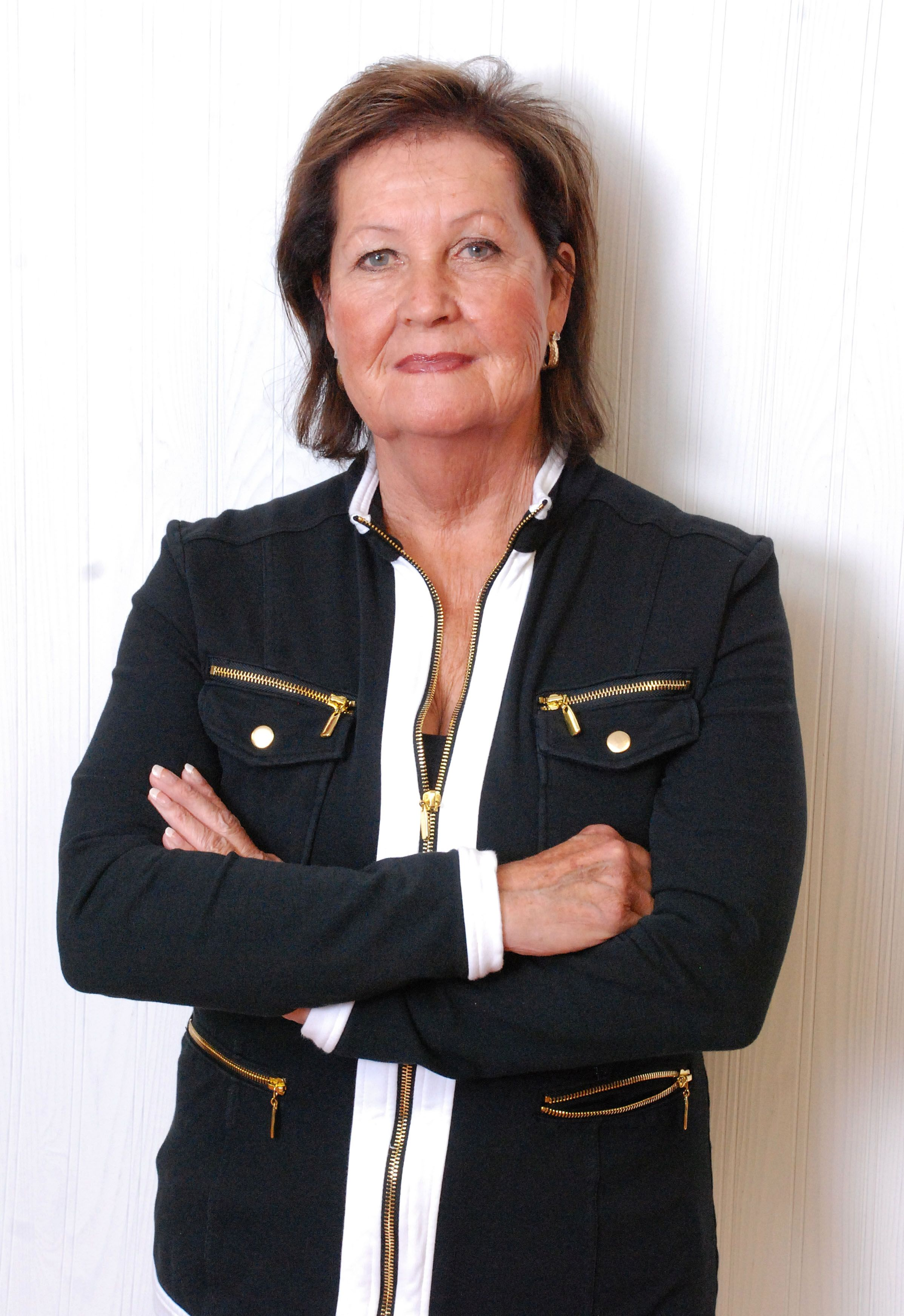
- Schwartz in 2012

Member of the Kansas House of Representatives from the 106th district
- In office January 13, 1997 – January 9, 2017
- Preceded by: William Bryant
- Succeeded by: Clay Aurand

Personal details
- Born: March 14, 1940 (age 86) Waterville, Kansas
- Party: Republican
- Spouse: Leo
- Children: 2

Sharon Schwartz (born March 14, 1940) is a former member of the Kansas House of Representatives, who represented the 106th district from 1997 to 2017.

Since 1983, Schwartz has worked as business manager for Pork Chop Acres, Incorporated. She has been a member of the Kansas Farm Bureau, Kansas Pork Producers, the National Pork Producers Council, and the National Federation of Independent Business.

== Committee membership ==
- Taxation
- Transportation
- Economic Development and Tourism
- Local Government (Chair)
- Select Committee on KPERS (Chair)
- Joint Committee on Economic Development
- Joint Committee on Pensions, Investments and Benefits

== Major donors ==
The top 5 donors to Schwartz's 2008 campaign:

- 1. Kansas Contractors Association PAC $1,000
- 2. Kansas Realtors PAC $500
- 3. Kansas Hospital Association $500
- 4. Kansas Dental Association $500
- 5. Twin Valley Telephone $500
