= Jack Hinson =

Confederate sniper (1807-1874)

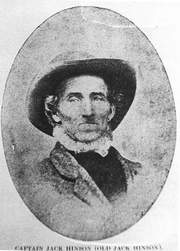
- Nickname: "Old Jack"
- Born: c. 1807; North Carolina, U.S.
- Died: April 28, 1874 (aged 66–67) Houston County, Tennessee, U.S.
- Buried: Cane Creek Cemetery, McKinnon, Tennessee, U.S.
- Allegiance: Confederate States
- Branch: Confederate States Army
- Service years: 1862–1864
- Conflicts: American Civil War; Franklin–Nashville campaign; Battle of Johnsonville

John W. Hinson, nicknamed "Old Jack" (c. 1807 – 28 April 1874) was a farmer in Stewart County, Tennessee, who operated as a Confederate partisan sniper in the Between-the-Rivers region of Tennessee and Kentucky during the American Civil War.

== American Civil War ==
Before the war, Hinson was a prosperous land and slave owner of Scotch-Irish descent, owning a plantation named "Bubbling Springs" with his wife and 10 children. Hinson voted for secession from the Union throughout various records, as well as personal testimonies from his neighbors. He had welcomed Union General Ulysses S. Grant to his home when Grant was in the area during the Union attack on Forts Henry and Donelson in February 1862. Due to the Confederate sympathy where the Hinson family lived, however, guerrillas known as "bushwhackers" began targeting Union soldiers. Others targeted Union farmers and sympathizers, with some instances resulting in entire pro-Union communities being attacked.

Hinson took up arms after his two sons, George (aged 22) and Jack (aged 17), were on a deer-hunting trip until they were executed by a Union patrol squad under the suspicion of being spies at Fort Donelson and participation in bushwhacker activity in the autumn of 1862. Their corpses were dragged back to the town center and decapitated, their heads then placed on the gateposts of the plantation as a warning.

Despite his age of 57, Hinson became a bushwhacker himself with a commissioned .50 caliber rifle based on the Whitworth rifle, his first targets being the lieutenant who ordered the deaths of his two sons and, later, the soldier who placed his sons' heads on the gateposts. Due to possible motivations, the Union soldiers had suspected Hinson as being responsible for the deaths of the two soldiers and as a response, the now-abandoned plantation was burnt. On December 31, 1862, Hinson killed his neutral neighbor, Swiss immigrant Albert Rougemont, with whom he had had a long-running argument for years before the war due to Rougemont testifying against Hinson in a Circuit Court case in which Hinson had been accused of altering the course of a road in the neighborhood. The murder was investigated by the Union Provost Marshal, with many of Hinson's neighbors attesting to his decades of violence before the war and his well-known "Secesh" position at the outset of the war. The verdict of the Provost Marshal was not recorded.

For the remainder of the war, Hinson used a 50 caliber Kentucky long rifle to conduct a personal war against the Union Army. He targeted Union soldiers at distances as great as a half mile on land and on military transports and gunboats on the Tennessee River and the Cumberland River. Hinson has been credited with as many as one hundred kills, although his rifle had only 36 notches; it has been suggested that the notches were for officers only.

Hinson served as a guide for Nathan Bedford Forrest during his successful cavalry raid on the Union supply base at the Battle of Johnsonville in November 1864. Hinson's son Robert led a guerrilla band in the area until he was killed in action on September 18, 1863. Hinson himself evaded capture, despite elements of four Union regiments being assigned at different times to pursue him, due to help from the locals and constant movement.

== Postwar life ==
After the war, he lived the rest of his life peacefully, mostly in Stewart County, settling the estate of his son George, voting, paying his taxes, etc., but also getting into some legal trouble as he had often done before the war. In 1867, he sold seven acres of timber off of his "Bubbling Springs" farm to the first Superintendent of the new National Cemetery.

Hinson died on April 28, 1874, at his residence in the White Oak/Magnolia area of Houston County, Tennessee. On the morning of his death, he complained of a severe pain between the shoulders. Remedies were applied, but no relief came and he died six hours after being taken. The attack was supposed to be meningitis. He is buried in the family plot in the Cane Creek Cemetery, off White Oak Road, near McKinnon, Tennessee. A monument to him is also located in the Boyd Cemetery in the Land-Between-the Lakes area. His 1874 obituary stated that he was interred at the Boyd Cemetery. Area newspapers in 1873 had been full of stories about the pursuit and capture of "Captain Jack", but those references are to Modoc chief Kintpuash, not to Hinson.

Hinson is commemorated in a roadside marker just across the state border in Kentucky, and his story has been told in two books by Tom McKenney:

- Battlefield Sniper: Over 100 Civil War Kills, Lt. Col. Tom C. McKenney
- Jack Hinson's One Man War
