= Jim Buck (Indiana politician) =

American politician

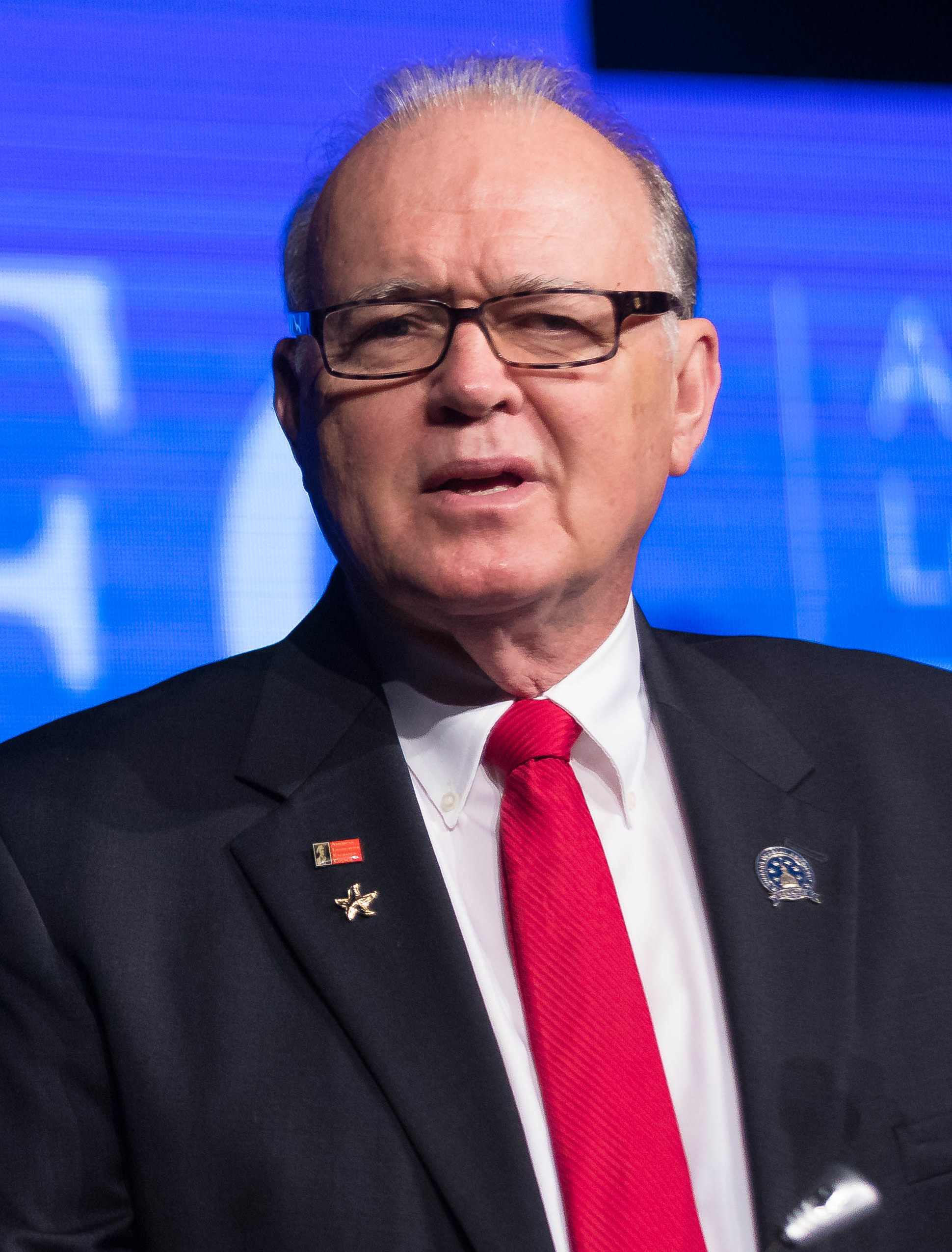
- Buck speaking at the 2017 American Legislative Exchange Council meeting

Member of the Indiana Senate from the 21st district
- In office April 26, 2008 – November 4, 2026
- Preceded by: Jeff Drozda
- Succeeded by: Tracey Powell

Member of the Indiana House of Representatives from the 38th district
- In office November 9, 1994 – April 26, 2008
- Preceded by: Brad Bayliff
- Succeeded by: Heath VanNatter

Personal details
- Born: July 30, 1945 (age 81) Logansport, Indiana, United States
- Party: Republican
- Spouse: Judy
- Education: Indiana Wesleyan University
- Occupation: Real Estate Broker, Tool and Die Mold Maker

James R. Buck (born July 30, 1945) is a former member of the Indiana State Senate representing the 21st district.

In 2025, Buck was one of 21 Republican senators to vote against mid-decade redistricting in Indiana, which would have net Republicans an additional 2 seats in the U.S. House of Representatives, prompting criticism from national and state Republicans such as president Donald Trump and governor Mike Braun, who endorsed a primary opponent.

In 2026, Buck lost renomination to Tracey Powell, 35.3%–64.7%.
