= National Pawnbrokers Association =

The National Pawnbrokers Association (NPA) is a USA-based trade association headquartered in Southlake, Texas. The NPA was founded in 1987 to help the growing number of pawnbrokers in the United States. Today, there are more than 1500 members in the National Pawnbrokers Association.
