= Marc Rhoades =

American politician

March Rhoades

Member of the Kansas House of Representatives from the 72nd district
- In office January 8, 2007 – January 9, 2017
- Preceded by: Tom Thull
- Succeeded by: Tim Hodge

Personal details
- Born: May 10, 1961 (age 65) Newton, Kansas, U.S.
- Party: Republican
- Spouse: Denise
- Education: Kansas State University

Marc Rhoades (May 10, 1961) is a Republican former member of the Kansas House of Representatives, representing the 72nd District. He served in the House from 2007 to 2017.

== Current committee assignments ==
- Appropriations (Chair)

== Past committee membership ==
- Taxation
- Higher Education (Vice-Chair)
- Social Services Budget (Vice-Chair)
- Joint Committee on State-Tribal Relations

== Major donors ==
The top 5 donors to Rhoades' 2008 campaign:

- American Legislative Exchange Council (ALEC) $1,800
- Kansas Hospital Assoc $1,000
- Fourth Dist Republican Comm $1,000
- Kansas Medical Society $1,000
- Watchous, Klee & Jennifer $1,000
