= The Hinsons =

Gospel Music Singers

- Also known as: The Original Hinsons / The Singing Hinson Family; The Hinsons
- Origin: California
- Genres: Christian music, Southern Gospel, Country Gospel, Christian Country
- Years active: 1967–1988, 1992–1994
- Label: Calvary Music Group
- Members: Kenny Hinson; Ronny Hinson; Larry Hinson; Yvonne Hinson Johnson
- Past members: Chris Hawkins Freeman; Bo Hinson; Eric Hinson; Stan Daily; Shawn McDougal; Kym Hinson Calvary; Corey Lester; Landon Hinson; Jourdyn Hinson
- Website: www.facebook.com/TheOriginalHinsons

The Original Hinsons (sometimes referred to as The Singing Hinson Family) were a Southern Gospel group that was formed in 1967 and was active until 1994.

== History ==
The Hinsons are one of the most prominent names in Southern Gospel. The first lineup of the group consisted of siblings Ronny, Yvonne, Kenny and Larry. They first sang together in 1967 after being asked to sing during revival services at a small church in Freedom, California. Though they had never sung together as a unit, they soon found themselves a popular favorite in churches and concert appearances along the west coast of the United States. Initially, they were known as "The Singing Hinson Family." However, as time and their popularity progressed they became known simply as "The Hinsons"! Eric Hinson and Bo Hinson were also part of the Original Hinsons. Bo continues to carry on the Legacy as "The Hinsons".

Historically, after some collaboration with Ronny and Kenny, the song "The Lighthouse" was written. It was first recorded the next year by The Goodmans and then by The Hinsons. Songs of Calvary and Journey Music, (then owned by Rusty Goodman), co-published the song. From 1973 to 1979, The Hinsons were the co-hosts of the television show The Gospel Singing Jubilee.

In 1974, Yvonne left the road and was replaced by 17-year-old Chris Hawkins for the next six years. In 1980 Chris left the group to start a full-time ministry with her husband Darrell which became The Freemans. Just as Yvonne re-joined the group, Larry left in 1981 to travel the country as an evangelist with his wife Jana and two young children. He did so until 1986, when he and his wife became pastors of a church in Little Rock, Arkansas. He was replaced in the group by Eric Hinson. In late 1984, Ronny "Bo" Hinson, Jr., replaced Eric until 1988, when the group took some time off for the members to pursue their individual ministries.

Kenny, the lead singer of The Hinsons, became pastor of a church in Houston, Texas.

After many conversations and phone calls with his family, Larry approached their record producer at Calvary Music Group and suggested a reunion project involving the original members. The original group reunited for the 13-city "One More Hallelujah" tour. The album One More Hallelujah featured the songs "Joy Comes In The Morning", "I'll Never Be Over The Hill" and "I've Been To Heaven". During the tour, lead singer Kenny Hinson was diagnosed with kidney cancer. After a long battle, he died on July 27, 1995 at the age of 41.

In Kenny's final days, the song "Oasis" was written by Ronny and Kenny in his hospital room. The legacy of Kenny continues on as he continues to recognized as one of the greatest make vocalists in southern gospel. After Kenny's death, Ronny, the eldest of the brothers in the group, continued to perform, write, and produce, and is still recognized as one of the great pioneer writers of southern gospel music.

Larry continued pastoring until 1996 when he and his wife and son went out on the evangelistic field. In 2008 they started SouthPoint Church in White House, Tennessee. Larry Hinson died on April 22, 2020.

Bo Hinson continues the Hinson legacy to this day as The Hinsons along with his son Landon Hinson, and Jourdyn Hinson.

== Awards and honors ==
The Hinsons were recognized by both the Dove Award and the Singing News Fan Awards (SNFA) for the 1972 Song of the year, "The Lighthouse". In 1973, they again won the SNFA Song of the Year for "He Pilots My Ship." In 1979, they were the SNFA choice for favorite group. Chris Hawkins was chosen as the SNFA favorite female singer in both 1976 and 1977. Larry was voted SNFA Favorite Baritone in 1977. Kenny was Favorite Male Singer for 1976, 1978 and 1980. In 1994, Kenny won a Diamond Award for his song "I'll Never Be Over the Hill" at the National Quartet Convention.

Ronny won the Favorite Songwriter award for four consecutive years from 1988 to 1991.

In 2000, Kenny was voted "Artist of the Decade" and placed into the Millennium Hall of Fame by ICGMA (International Country Gospel Music Association.) Kenny was inducted into the Gospel Music Association's Hall of Fame in 2004. The entire group was inducted into the Gospel Music Association's Hall of Fame in 2006.

== Personnel changes ==
In 1974, Yvonne left the road and was replaced for six years by Chris Hawkins Freeman. In 1981, just as Yvonne re-joined the group Larry left the group and was replaced by their nephew, Eric Hinson. In late 1984. Ronny "Bo" Hinson Jr. replaced Eric until 1988. when the group took some time off for the members to pursue individual ministries. In 1992, Ronny, Larry, Kenny, and Yvonne reunited for the "One More Hallelujah" tour. After Kenny's death, the Original Hinsons have reunited only for special events, with Bo singing lead, and either with Chris Hawkins Freeman or their sister Yvonne Hinson Johnson.

== The Hinsons ==
Bo Hinson was one of the original Hinsons. He joined the Original Hinsons full time in 1984 and was with them for 5 years until they retired. In 1990 Bo Hinson started a group called Bo Hinson and Purpose. This evolved into The New Hinsons. The group experienced success in 1994 with the release of the hit song, "Speak the Word, Lord". And in 1996, the group had their first #1 song with "Oasis". The song was written by Ronny Hinson. "Oasis" was #1 for 4 months (April–July 1996) and came in as the #1 song for all of 1996. On Paul Heil's program, "The Gospel Greats", the song was named the #6 song in the Top 20 Songs of the 1990s. Also featured in the baritone part was Mike Bowling, who would later travel with the Perrys and Crabb Family and eventually start his own group in 2006. The group later claimed the #1 spot again in December 1996 with "Old Ship of Zion". The New Hinsons would continue to experience success with hits like "If There Had Been No Calvary", "Sin Died Here", "Still Go Free", and "Who but God?". With the family's blessing, in 2008 Bo renamed The New Hinsons to The Hinsons. Their first recording under that name was entitled Favor. This album features the songs "The Potter's Wheel", "Holy Awe", and "God Will Make A Way".

== The Hinson Family ==
In 2008 Weston Hinson (son of Kenny Hinson) started the group Weston Hinson & By Faith and in 2009 they recorded their debut album Home With You Tonight. featuring songs as "Healed Perfect" and "Let Go Of The Rope". Later they changed the name to Weston and Christy Hinson and recorded their 2nd album called Let's Have Some Church, with songs as "Let's Have Some Church", "I Get To Go", "On The Other Side Of This", as well as the world-famous song "The Lighthouse", which featured Larry Hinson. In 2013, they were joined by Jordyn Honea. Later that year, they recorded their 3rd album Christmas Like It Was. In 2014, they changed the name to The Hinson Family then recorded their 4th album Tribute To The Original Hinsons with such songs as "Burdens are Lifted Away", "Joy Comes in The Morning", "Never Be Over The Hill", and the world-famous "Call Me Gone", among many more.

=== Members ===
- Weston Hinson
- Christy Hinson
- Jordan Honea

== Original Members ==
Lead

- Kenny Hinson (1967–1994)

Alto/High Tenor/Soprano

- Yvonne Hinson Johnson (1967–1974; 1980–1994
- Chris Hawkins Freeman (1974–1980)
- Greg Taylor (?)

Bass

- Ronny Hinson (1967–1994)

Tenor/Baritone/Lead

- Larry Hinson (1967–1981; 1992–1994)
- Eric Hinson (1981–1984)
- Bo Hinson (1984–1988)

== Discography ==
The Original Hinsons

- Here Comes The Hinsons (1970)
- A Gospel Sound Spectacular (1970)
- The Lighthouse (1971) featuring the GMA Song of the Year for 1972
- He Pilots My Ship (1972) featuring the SNFA Song of the Year for 1973
- We Promise You Gospel (1973)

With Chris Hawkins

- Touch Of Hinson, Glimpse Of Glory (1974)
- Harvest Of Hits (1975)
- High Voltage (1976)
- From Out Of The West They Came, Live and On Stage (1975)
- The Group That God Built (1977)
- On The Road (1978)
- Prime (1979)

With Larry and Yvonne

- Song Vineyard (1980)

With Eric Hinson

- Bubblin' (1981)
- Hinsongs (1982)
- To The Core (1983)
- A Hinson Christmas (1983)
- Lift The Roof Off, Live (1984)
- The Hinsons Greatest Hits Vol. 1 (1986)

With Bo Hinson

- It Runs In The Family (1985)
- The Legacy Goes On (1986)
- Generations (1987)
- Encore, Live from Nashville (1988)

With Original Group

- One More Hallelujah (1992)
- Tulsa Live (1993)

== Today ==
Ronny continues to perform, preach and sing alongside his wife Lisa. as well as write and produce. Chris Hawkins Freeman still travels with the group The Freemans.

Larry Hinson died on April 22, 2020.

Bo still travels all over the country with his group The Hinsons.
