= Dave Hinson =

American politician (born 1972)

Member of the Missouri House of Representatives from the 119th district
- In office 2011–2017

Personal details
- Born: February 3, 1972 (age 54)
- Party: Republican

Dave Hinson (born February 3, 1972) is an American politician. He was member of the Missouri House of Representatives for the 119th district.

Hinson later served as Franklin County Associate Commissioner. He resigned in 2024.
