= John Dankosky =

John Dankosky (August 14) is a radio journalist and moderator, who is currently Director of News and Audio for the public radio program Science Friday. During a 25-year career at Connecticut Public Radio, he founded the national award-winning program Where We Live.

== Biography ==
Originally from Pittsburgh, Dankosky is a veteran public radio broadcaster, who began his career in 1988 at WDUQ. After moving to Connecticut in 1994, Dankosky founded the daily talk shows Where We Live and The Wheelhouse, co-founded the New England News Collaborative and its weekly news program NEXT. He has also reported for National Public Radio, worked on the collaborative public radio project America Amplified has edited award-winning documentaries on Connecticut history, 9/11, and the mental health of children, and has co-produced recordings of traditional musicians who made their homes in Connecticut. He currently hosts the podcasts Steady Habits and Untold for the online news organization The Connecticut Mirror, and serves as fill-in host and news director of Science Friday. He is a frequent moderator for The Connecticut Forum, The International Festival of Arts & Ideas, and narrator for Christmas Angelicus, the annual holiday concert performed by Chorus Angelicus. Dankosky has worked as a journalism professor at Quinnipiac University and Central Connecticut State University, where he served as the first Robert C. Vance Endowed Chair in Journalism.
