= WEDW =

WEDW may refer to:

- WEDW (TV), a Connecticut Public Television station in Stamford, Connecticut
- WEDW-FM, a Connecticut Public Radio station in Stamford, Connecticut
