= WVOF =

Public radio station at Fairfield University in Fairfield, Connecticut

- Fairfield, Connecticut; United States
- Broadcast area: Greater Bridgeport
- Frequency: 88.5 MHz

Programming
- Language: English
- Format: Public radio
- Affiliations: Connecticut Public Radio

Ownership
- Owner: Fairfield University

History
- First air date: 1970
- Call sign meaning: Voice of Fairfield

Technical information
- Licensing authority: FCC
- Facility ID: 20456
- Class: A
- ERP: 100 watts
- HAAT: 10 meters (33 ft)
- Transmitter coordinates: 41°09′32.34788″N 73°15′33.41294″W

Links
- Public license information: Public file; LMS
- Webcast: Listen live (via TuneIn)
- Website: wvof.org

WVOF (88.5 FM) is a radio station licensed to Fairfield, Connecticut. The station is owned by Fairfield University. As of August 2008, the station has been a partner with Connecticut Public Radio and carries Connecticut Public Radio and NPR programming.

== History ==
WVOF commenced operations in the spring of 1970 as a carrier current radio station heard on 620 AM serving the residence halls located in the quadrangle of Fairfield University. A carrier current system is a method of broadcasting using the electrical wires in a building as an antenna. This type of operating does not require the station to be licensed by the Federal Communications Commission (FCC).

In the early 1970s, then-station manager Stan Hiriak (who later went on to work for Connecticut Public Television) made the first application to the FCC for an FM license. The first antenna was placed on Canisius Hall. The station's broadcasts were piped into the Barone Campus Center. WVOF's record library was kept in the basement of Regis Hall and the early news broadcasts were produced with the aid of a UPI rip-and-read teletype. By 1976 there were two broadcast studios and one production studio in the cramped quarters.

Some of the early student personalities during that time 1970-76 included Hiriak, a senior when the station "went FM" who hosted music and news events and is widely credited with being the single most influential person responsible for navigating the station's initiative to move to FM; the late Mick McCullough, who later became station manager and a music host; Bill O'Neil, a Maine native who worked professionally for a number of stations in Portland after graduating from Fairfield in 1972; Mary Beth Carmody, one of the station's first female hosts; Rich Mcheer, a hockey announcer when the Stags had a club hockey team that played at Bridgeport's Wonderland of Ice; and Doc Hynes, who was a music host and basketball play-by-play announcer who teamed with McCullough blending sports and comedy during game broadcasts, which occasionally got them in hot water with the university administration.

During the mid-1980s, the station was under the leadership of Music Director Sean "The Hag" Hagearty. In 2002, the Fairfield University's radio station opened for business in a new three-studio complex in the John A. Barone Campus Center. WVOF regularly hears from listeners in South America, Europe, the West Coast and Canada.

=== Connecticut Public Radio ===
On June 19, 2008, the Connecticut Public Broadcasting Corporation and Fairfield University announced a partnership between Connecticut Public Radio ("WNPR") and WVOF. WVOF broadcasts WNPR's program schedule every weekday morning from 5 to 10 am, every weekday afternoon from 4 to 6 pm, and weekend mornings from 5 a.m. to noon.

== Sports radio ==
=== Bridgeport Bluefish ===
In 2002, WVOF began carrying Bridgeport Bluefish baseball games, and on July 12, 2006, it carried the Atlantic League All-Star Game.

=== Fairfield Stags basketball ===
WVOF is the home of Fairfield Stags men's and women's basketball. Men's basketball coverage is led play-by-play analyst Bob Heussler with color commentary from Stag basketball legend Joe DeSantis '79. Women's basketball coverage is led by play-by-play analyst John Cummings with color commentary from former UConn guard Maria Conlon. Fairfield University students participate in the production and color commentary for both the men's and women's games.

=== Fairfield Stags lacrosse ===
WVOF is also the home of several Fairfield Stags men's lacrosse home games each year.

== Fairfield alumni in TV, radio, film, and other media ==
- Sonia Baghdady - News Anchor WTNH, Emmy Award winner
- Burt Kearns '78 - television and film producer, writer, director, journalist and author

== See also ==
- Campus radio
- Connecticut Public Radio
- Fairfield University
- List of college radio stations in the United States
