= 2022 United States House of Representatives elections in Connecticut =

- November 8, 2022

All 5 Connecticut seats to the United States House of Representatives
| | Majority party | Minority party |
|---|---|---|
| Party | Democratic | Republican |
| Last election | 5 | 0 |
| Seats won | 5 | 0 |
| Seat change | Steady | Steady |
| Popular vote | 721,526 | 526,372 |
| Percentage | 57.20% | 41.73% |
| Swing | ▼2.63% | ▲3.21% |

Democratic
40–50%
50–60%
60–70%
70–80%
80–90%
Republican
40–50%
50–60%
60–70%

The 2022 United States House of Representatives elections in Connecticut were held on November 8, 2022, to elect the five U.S. representatives from the state of Connecticut, one from each of the state's five congressional districts. The elections coincided with the 2022 U.S. Senate race in Connecticut and the 2022 Connecticut gubernatorial election, as well as other elections to the House of Representatives, other elections to the United States Senate, and various state and local elections.

This election was the closest the Republican Party has gotten to gaining a seat since 2006, with representative Jahana Hayes winning re-election by a 0.79% margin.

== Overview ==
Results of the 2022 United States House of Representatives elections in Connecticut by district:

| District | Democratic | | Republican | | Others† | | Total | | Result |
| District | Votes | % | Votes | % | Votes | % | Votes | % | Result |
|---|---|---|---|---|---|---|---|---|---|
| District 1 | 149,556* | 61.3% | 91,506 | 37.5% | 2,851 | 1.2% | 243,913 | 100.0% | Democratic hold |
| District 2 | 165,946 | 58.2% | 114,506 | 40.2% | 4,579 | 1.6% | 285,031 | 100.0% | Democratic hold |
| District 3 | 137,924 | 56.8% | 98,704 | 40.7% | 6,023 | 2.5% | 242,651 | 100.0% | Democratic hold |
| District 4 | 140,262 | 59.4% | 95,822* | 40.6% | 0 | 0.0% | 236,0840 | 100.0% | Democratic hold |
| District 5 | 127,838* | 50.4% | 125,834* | 49.6% | 0 | 0.0% | 253,672 | 100.0% | Democratic hold |
| Total | 721,526* | 57.2% | 526,372* | 41.7% | 13,453 | 1.1% | 1,261,351 | 100.0% | |

- *Includes votes for candidates on more than one party line
- † Does not include fusion vote counts -- see individual districts for details

== District 1 ==
2022 Connecticut's 1st congressional district election
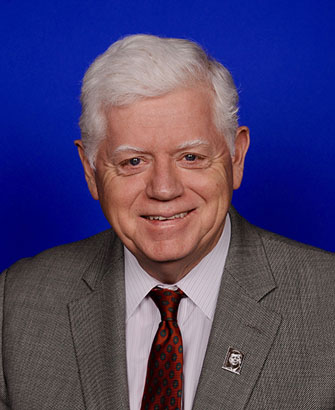

| Nominee | John Larson | Larry Lazor |
| Party | Democratic | Republican |
| Alliance | Working Families |
| Popular vote | 149,556 | 91,506 |
| Percentage | 61.3% | 37.5% |
- Municipality results Larson 50–60% 60–70% 70–80% 80–90% Lazor 50–60% 60–70%
U.S. Representative before election
John Larson
Democratic
Elected U.S. Representative
John Larson
Democratic

The 1st district encompasses Hartford and the surrounding areas, including the north-central part of the state. The incumbent was Democrat John Larson, who was re-elected with 63.8% of the vote in 2020.

=== Democratic primary ===
==== Candidates ====
===== Nominee =====
- John Larson, incumbent U.S. representative

===== Disqualified =====
- Muad Hrezi, educator and former U.S. Senate staffer

===== Withdrawn =====
- Andrew Legnani, former EMT (endorsed Hrezi)

==== Endorsements ====
Muad Hrezi

Individuals

- Marianne Williamson, author and candidate for president of the United States in 2020

Organizations

- Jewish Voice for Peace Action Fund
- Sunrise Connecticut
John Larson

Organizations

- Democratic Majority for Israel
- Planned Parenthood Action Fund
- Sierra Club

Labor unions

- Connecticut AFL–CIO

=== Republican convention ===
==== Candidates ====
===== Nominee =====
- Larry Lazor, physician

=== General election ===
==== Debate ====
2022 Connecticut's 1st congressional district debate
| No. | Date | Host | Moderator | Link | Democratic | Republican | Green |
| Key: P Participant A Absent N Not invited I Invited W Withdrawn | | | | | | | |
| Key: P Participant A Absent N Not invited I Invited W Withdrawn | | | | | John Larson | Larry Lazor | Mary Sanders |
|---|---|---|---|---|---|---|---|
| 1 | Oct. 12, 2022 | Connecticut Public; Broadcasting | Ray Hardman | | P | P | N |

==== Predictions ====
| Source | Ranking | As of |
|---|---|---|
| The Cook Political Report | Solid D | February 10, 2022 |
| Inside Elections | Solid D | April 20, 2022 |
| Sabato's Crystal Ball | Safe D | February 16, 2022 |
| Politico | Solid D | April 5, 2022 |
| RCP | Safe D | June 9, 2022 |
| Fox News | Solid D | October 11, 2022 |
| DDHQ | Solid D | July 20, 2022 |
| 538 | Solid D | June 30, 2022 |
| The Economist | Safe D | September 28, 2022 |

==== Results ====
2022 Connecticut's 1st congressional district election
| Party | Candidate | Votes | % |
|---|---|---|---|
| Democratic | John Larson | 144,873 | 59.39 |
| Working Families | John Larson | 4,683 | 1.92 |
| Total | John Larson | 149,556 | 61.31 |
| Republican | Larry Lazor | 91,506 | 37.52 |
| Green | Mary Sanders | 2,851 | 1.17 |
| Total votes | | 243,913 | 100.00 |
| Democratic hold | | | |

== District 2 ==
2022 Connecticut's 2nd congressional district election
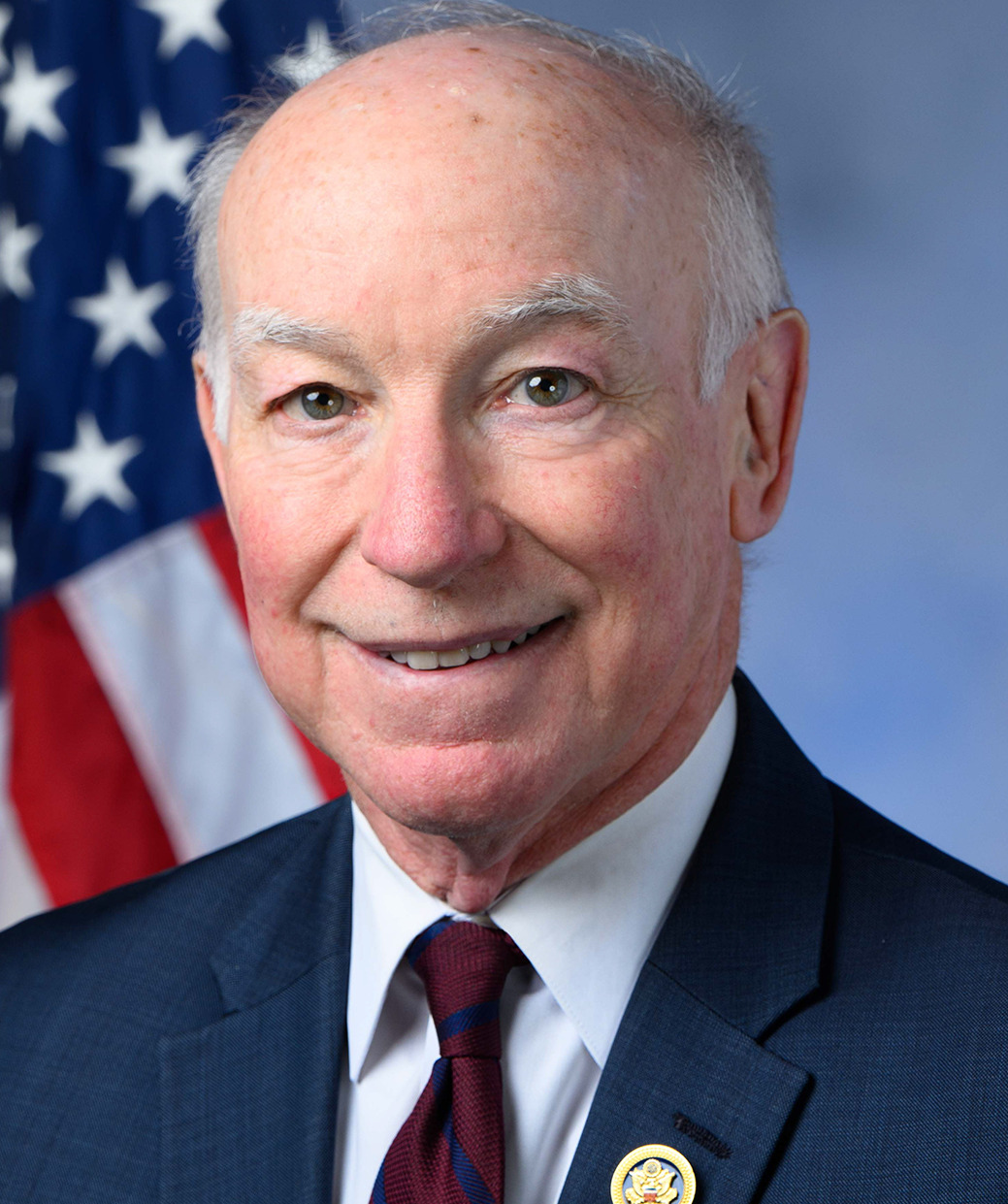

| Nominee | Joe Courtney | Mike France |
| Party | Democratic | Republican |
| Popular vote | 165,946 | 114,506 |
| Percentage | 58.2% | 40.2% |
- Municipality results Courtney 40–50% 50–60% 60–70% 70–80% France 40–50% 50–60%
U.S. Representative before election
Joe Courtney
Democratic
Elected U.S. Representative
Joe Courtney
Democratic

The 2nd congressional district is located in eastern Connecticut and includes Enfield, Norwich, New London, and Groton. The incumbent was Democrat Joe Courtney, who was re-elected with 59.4% of the vote in 2020. Courtney ran for and won re-election in 2022.

=== Democratic convention ===
==== Candidates ====
===== Nominee =====
- Joe Courtney, incumbent U.S. representative

===== Failed to qualify =====
- Anthony DiLizia, Army veteran

==== Endorsements ====
Joe Courtney

Organizations

- Planned Parenthood Action Fund
- Sierra Club

Labor unions

- Connecticut AFL–CIO

=== Republican convention ===
==== Candidates ====
===== Nominee =====
- Mike France, state representative

=== General election ===
==== Debate ====
2022 Connecticut's 2nd congressional district debate
| No. | Date | Host | Moderator | Link | Democratic | Republican | Green | Libertarian |
| Key: P Participant A Absent N Not invited I Invited W Withdrawn | | | | | | | | |
| Key: P Participant A Absent N Not invited I Invited W Withdrawn | | | | | Joe Courtney | Mike France | Kevin Blacker | William Hall |
|---|---|---|---|---|---|---|---|---|
| 1 | Oct. 4, 2022 | Connecticut Public; Broadcasting | Catherine Shen | | P | P | N | N |

==== Predictions ====
| Source | Ranking | As of |
|---|---|---|
| The Cook Political Report | Likely D | May 26, 2022 |
| Inside Elections | Solid D | April 20, 2022 |
| Sabato's Crystal Ball | Likely D | February 16, 2022 |
| Politico | Likely D | April 5, 2022 |
| RCP | Lean D | October 30, 2022 |
| Fox News | Lean D | July 11, 2022 |
| DDHQ | Likely D | July 20, 2022 |
| 538 | Solid D | October 30, 2022 |
| The Economist | Likely D | November 1, 2022 |

==== Polling ====
| Poll source | Date(s) administered | Sample size (Note: Key: A – all adults RV – registered voters LV – likely voters V – unclear) | Margin of error | Joe Courtney (D) | Mike France (R) | William Hall (L) | Other | Undecided |
|---|---|---|---|---|---|---|---|---|
| Fabrizio, Lee & Associates (R) | October 23–27, 2022 | 600 (LV) | ± 4.0% | 51% | 29% | 5% | 2% (Note: Blacker with 2%) | 13% |
| Fabrizio, Lee & Associates (R) | October 23–27, 2022 | 600 (LV) | ± 4.0% | 55% | 36% | – | – | 9% |

==== Results ====
2022 Connecticut's 2nd congressional district election
| Party | Candidate | Votes | % |
|---|---|---|---|
| Democratic | Joe Courtney (incumbent) | 165,946 | 58.22 |
| Republican | Mike France | 114,506 | 40.17 |
| Green | Kevin Blacker | 2,439 | 0.86 |
| Libertarian | William Hall | 2,140 | 0.75 |
| Total votes | | 285,031 | 100.00 |
| Democratic hold | | | |

== District 3 ==
2022 Connecticut's 3rd congressional district election
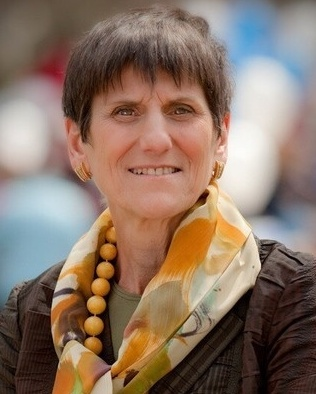

| Nominee | Rosa DeLauro | Lesley DeNardis |
| Party | Democratic | Republican |
| Popular vote | 137,924 | 98,704 |
| Percentage | 56.8% | 40.7% |
- Municipality results DeLauro 40–50% 50–60% 60–70% 70–80% 80–90% DeNardis 40–50% 50–60% 60–70%
U.S. Representative before election
Rosa DeLauro
Democratic
Elected U.S. Representative
Rosa DeLauro
Democratic

The 3rd district is located in the south central part of the state and takes in New Haven and its surrounding suburbs. The incumbent was Democrat Rosa DeLauro, was re-elected with 58.7% of the vote in 2020. DeLauro ran for and won re-election in 2022.

=== Democratic convention ===
==== Candidates ====
===== Nominee =====
- Rosa DeLauro, incumbent U.S. representative

==== Endorsements ====
Rosa DeLauro

Organizations

- NARAL Pro-Choice America
- Planned Parenthood Action Fund
- Sierra Club

Labor unions

- Connecticut AFL–CIO

=== Republican convention ===
==== Candidates ====
===== Nominee =====
- Lesley DeNardis, daughter of former congressman Lawrence DeNardis and former Hamden Board of Education member

=== Independents and third-party candidates ===
==== Declared ====
- Amy Chai (independent), physician
- Justin Paglino (Green), doctor and nominee for this district in 2020

=== General election ===
==== Predictions ====
| Source | Ranking | As of |
|---|---|---|
| The Cook Political Report | Solid D | February 10, 2022 |
| Inside Elections | Solid D | April 20, 2022 |
| Sabato's Crystal Ball | Safe D | February 16, 2022 |
| Politico | Solid D | April 5, 2022 |
| RCP | Likely D | June 9, 2022 |
| Fox News | Solid D | November 1, 2022 |
| DDHQ | Solid D | July 20, 2022 |
| 538 | Solid D | June 30, 2022 |
| The Economist | Safe D | September 28, 2022 |

==== Results ====
2022 Connecticut's 3rd congressional district election
| Party | Candidate | Votes | % |
|---|---|---|---|
| Democratic | Rosa DeLauro (incumbent) | 137,924 | 56.84 |
| Republican | Lesley DeNardis | 98,704 | 40.68 |
| Independent Party | Amy Chai | 4,056 | 1.67 |
| Green | Justin Paglino | 1,967 | 0.81 |
| Total votes | | 242,651 | 100.00 |
| Democratic hold | | | |

== District 4 ==
2022 Connecticut's 4th congressional district election
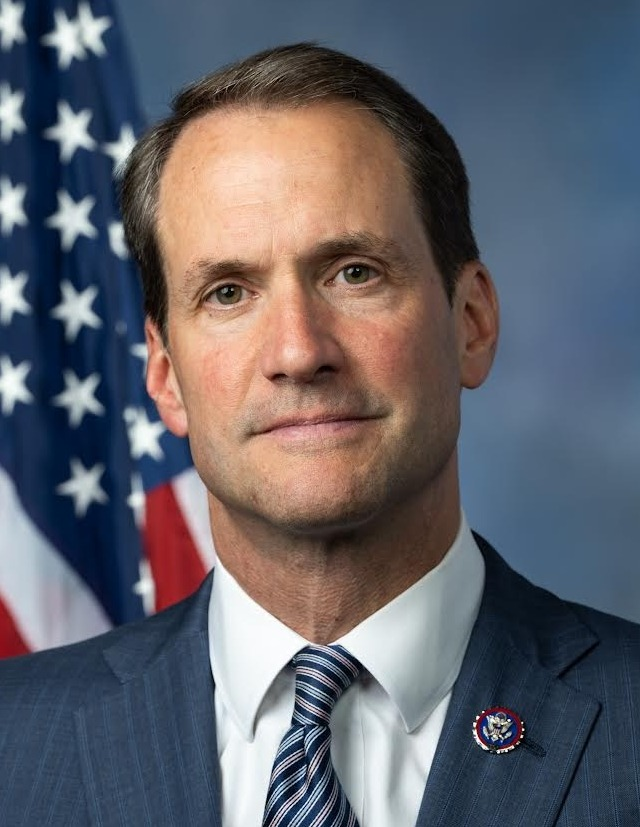

| Nominee | Jim Himes | Jayme Stevenson |
| Party | Democratic | Republican |
| Alliance | | Independent Party |
| Popular vote | 140,262 | 95,822 |
| Percentage | 59.4% | 40.6% |
- Municipality results Himes 50–60% 60–70% 70–80% Stevenson 50–60% 60–70%
U.S. Representative before election
Jim Himes
Democratic
Elected U.S. Representative
Jim Himes
Democratic

The 4th district is located in southwestern Connecticut, stretching from Greenwich to Bridgeport. The incumbent was Democrat Jim Himes, who was re-elected with 62.2% of the vote in 2020. Himes ran for and won re-election in 2022.

=== Democratic convention ===
==== Candidates ====
===== Nominee =====
- Jim Himes, incumbent U.S. representative

==== Endorsements ====
Jim Himes

Organizations

- Planned Parenthood Action Fund
- Sierra Club

Labor unions

- Connecticut AFL–CIO

=== Republican primary ===
==== Candidates ====
===== Nominee =====
- Jayme Stevenson, former Darien First Selectman and candidate for Lieutenant Governor of Connecticut in 2018

===== Eliminated in primary =====
- Michael Goldstein, ophthalmologist

==== Results ====
Republican primary results
| Party | Candidate | Votes | % |
|---|---|---|---|
| Republican | Jayme Stevenson | 9,962 | 60.3 |
| Republican | Michael Goldstein | 6,655 | 39.7 |
| Total votes | | 16,517 | 100.0 |

=== General election ===
==== Debate ====
2022 Connecticut's 4th congressional district debate
| No. | Date | Host | Moderator | Link | Democratic | Republican |
| Key: P Participant A Absent N Not invited I Invited W Withdrawn | | | | | | |
| Key: P Participant A Absent N Not invited I Invited W Withdrawn | | | | | Jim Himes | Jayme Stevenson |
|---|---|---|---|---|---|---|
| 1 | Oct. 14, 2022 | Connecticut Public; Broadcasting | Kaliliah; Brown-Dean | | P | P |

==== Predictions ====
| Source | Ranking | As of |
|---|---|---|
| The Cook Political Report | Solid D | February 10, 2022 |
| Inside Elections | Solid D | April 20, 2022 |
| Sabato's Crystal Ball | Safe D | February 16, 2022 |
| Politico | Solid D | April 5, 2022 |
| RCP | Safe D | June 9, 2022 |
| Fox News | Solid D | October 11, 2022 |
| DDHQ | Solid D | July 20, 2022 |
| 538 | Solid D | June 30, 2022 |
| The Economist | Safe D | September 28, 2022 |

==== Polling ====
| Poll source | Date(s) administered | Sample size | Margin of error | Jim Himes (D) | Jayme Stevenson (R) | Other | Undecided |
|---|---|---|---|---|---|---|---|
| Fabrizio, Lee & Associates (R) | October 23–27, 2022 | 600 (LV) | ± 4.0% | 53% | 37% | – | 10% |

==== Results ====
2022 Connecticut's 4th congressional district election
| Party | Candidate | Votes | % |
|---|---|---|---|
| Democratic | Jim Himes (incumbent) | 140,262 | 59.41 |
| Republican | Jayme Stevenson | 93,329 | 39.53 |
| Independent Party | Jayme Stevenson | 2,493 | 1.05 |
| Total | Jayme Stevenson | 95,822 | 40.58 |
| Total votes | | 236,084 | 100.00 |
| Democratic hold | | | |

== District 5 ==
2022 Connecticut's 5th congressional district election
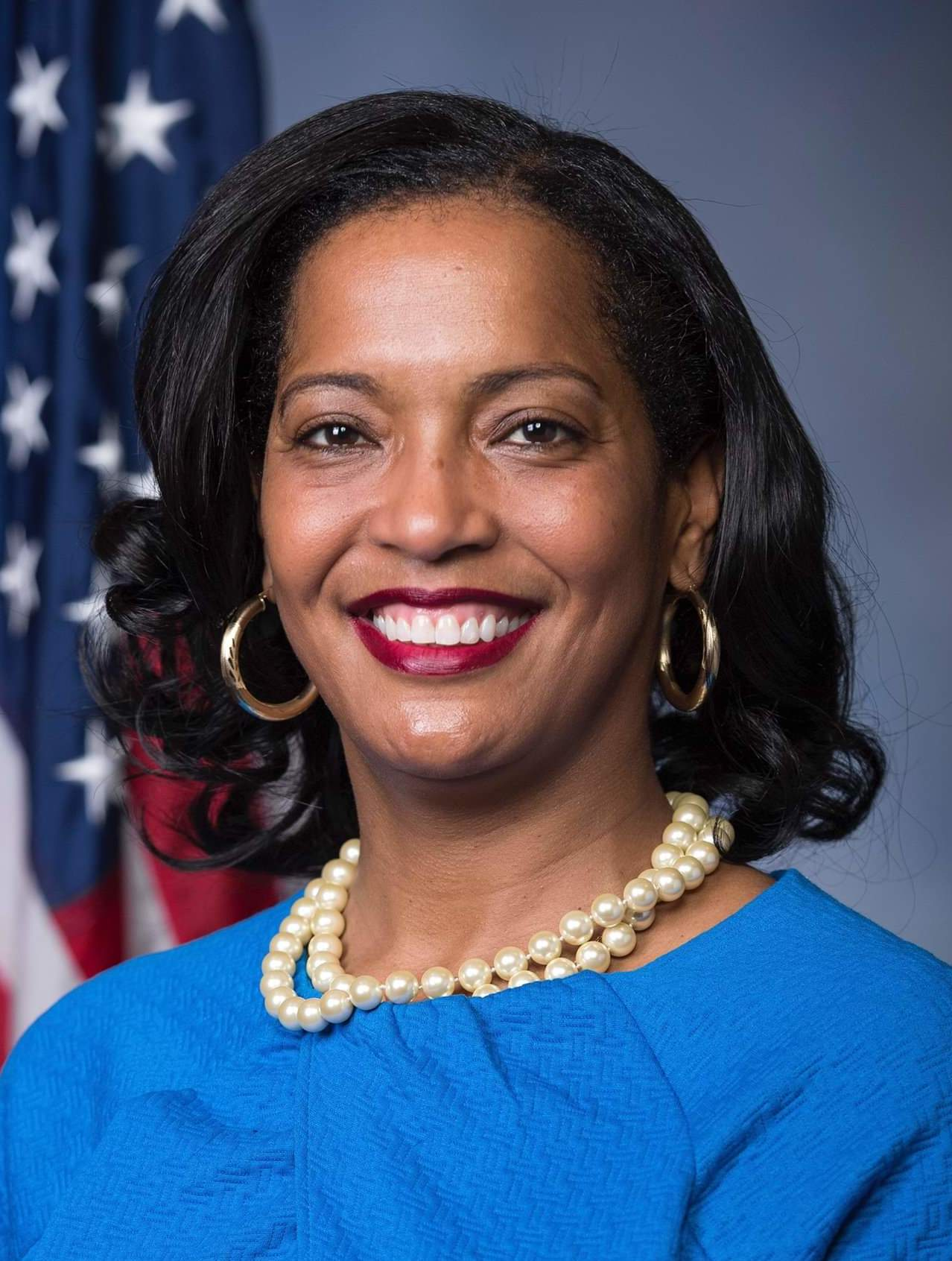

| Nominee | Jahana Hayes | George Logan |
| Party | Democratic | Republican |
| Alliance | Working Families | Independent Party |
| Popular vote | 127,838 | 125,834 |
| Percentage | 50.4% | 49.6% |
- Municipality results Hayes 50–60% 60–70% 70–80% Logan 50–60% 60–70%
U.S. Representative before election
Jahana Hayes
Democratic
Elected U.S. Representative
Jahana Hayes
Democratic

The 5th district is based in the northwestern region of the state, including the cities of Danbury, New Britain, Meriden, and most of Waterbury. The incumbent was Democrat Jahana Hayes, who was re-elected with 55.1% of the vote in 2020. Hayes ran for and narrowly won re-election in 2022 by a margin of 0.8%.

=== Democratic convention ===
==== Candidates ====
===== Nominee =====
- Jahana Hayes, incumbent U.S. representative

==== Endorsements ====
Jahana Hayes

Organizations

- American Israel Public Affairs Committee
- Congressional Black Caucus
- Democratic Majority for Israel
- EMILY's List
- Feminist Majority PAC
- Giffords
- Humane Society of the United States Legislative Fund
- League of Conservation Voters
- NARAL Pro-Choice America
- Planned Parenthood Action Fund
- Sierra Club

Labor unions

- Connecticut AFL–CIO

=== Republican convention ===
==== Candidates ====
===== Nominee =====
- George Logan, former state senator (2017–2021)

==== Endorsements ====
George Logan

U.S. representatives

- Steve Scalise, U.S. representative from Louisiana's 1st congressional district (2008–)
- Elise Stefanik, U.S. representative from New York's 21st congressional district (2015–present)
- Bryan Steil, U.S. representative from Wisconsin's 1st congressional district (2019–present)

Organizations

- Log Cabin Republicans
- United States Chamber of Commerce

=== Debates ===
2022 Connecticut's 5th congressional district debates
| No. | Date | Host | Moderator | Link | Democratic | Republican |
| Key: P Participant A Absent N Not invited I Invited W Withdrawn | | | | | | |
| Key: P Participant A Absent N Not invited I Invited W Withdrawn | | | | | Jahana Hayes | George Logan |
|---|---|---|---|---|---|---|
| 1 | Oct. 18, 2022 | WTNH | Dennis House | | P | P |
| 2 | Oct. 21, 2022 | Connecticut Public; Broadcasting | Frankie Graziano | | P | P |

==== Predictions ====
| Source | Ranking | As of |
|---|---|---|
| The Cook Political Report | Tossup | October 25, 2022 |
| Inside Elections | Tossup | November 3, 2022 |
| Sabato's Crystal Ball | Lean R (flip) | November 7, 2022 |
| Politico | Tossup | October 3, 2022 |
| RCP | Tossup | October 3, 2022 |
| Fox News | Tossup | November 1, 2022 |
| DDHQ | Lean D | October 27, 2022 |
| 538 | Lean D | October 25, 2022 |
| The Economist | Tossup | November 1, 2022 |

==== Polling ====
Aggregate polls

| Source of poll aggregation | Dates administered | Dates updated | Jahana Hayes (D) | George Logan (R) | Undecided (Note: Calculated by taking the difference of 100% and all other candidates combined.) | Margin |
|---|---|---|---|---|---|---|
| FiveThirtyEight | July 16 – October 27, 2022 | October 29, 2022 | 46.7% | 45.3% | 8.0% | Hayes +1.4 |

Graphical summary

| Poll source | Date(s) administered | Sample size | Margin of error | Jahana Hayes (D) | George Logan (R) | Other | Undecided |
|---|---|---|---|---|---|---|---|
| Fabrizio, Lee & Associates (R) | October 23–27, 2022 | 600 (LV) | ± 4.0% | 45% | 45% | – | 10% |
| Emerson College | October 19–21, 2022 | 500 (LV) | ± 4.3% | 47% | 48% | – | 6% |
| Public Opinion Strategies (R) (Note: This poll was sponsored jointly by the National Republican Congressional Committee and Logan's campaign committee) | October 4–6, 2022 | 400 (LV) | ± 4.9% | 48% | 46% | – | 6% |
| RMG Research | July 20–26, 2022 | 400 (LV) | ± 4.9% | 45% | 37% | 3% | 15% |
| The Tarrance Group (R) (Note: This poll was sponsored by the Congressional Leadership Fund) | July 16–24, 2022 | 400 (RV) | ± 4.9% | 45% | 45% | – | 9% |
| Public Opinion Strategies (R) | June 29–30, 2022 | 400 (LV) | ± 4.9% | 46% | 41% | – | 13% |

Hypothetical polling

Generic Democrat vs. generic Republican

| Poll source | Date(s) administered | Sample size | Margin of error | Generic Democrat | Generic Republican | Undecided |
|---|---|---|---|---|---|---|
| Public Opinion Strategies (R) | October 4–6, 2022 | 400 (LV) | ± 4.9% | 42% | 47% | 11% |
| The Tarrance Group (R) | July 16–24, 2022 | 400 (RV) | ± 4.9% | 42% | 48% | 10% |
| Public Opinion Strategies (R) | June 29–30, 2022 | 400 (LV) | ± 4.9% | 44% | 44% | 12% |

==== Results ====
2022 Connecticut's 5th congressional district election
| Party | Candidate | Votes | % |
|---|---|---|---|
| Democratic | Jahana Hayes | 123,818 | 48.81 |
| Working Families | Jahana Hayes | 4,020 | 1.58 |
| Total | Jahana Hayes (incumbent) | 127,838 | 50.39 |
| Republican | George Logan | 123,342 | 48.62 |
| Independent Party | George Logan | 2,492 | 0.98 |
| Total | George Logan | 125,834 | 49.60 |
| Total votes | | 253,672 | 100.00 |
| Democratic hold | | | |

== Notes ==
Partisan clients
