= New England News Collaborative =

New England public media news consortium

The New England News Collaborative (NENC) is a 10-station consortium of public media newsrooms located throughout New England. NENC produced NEXT, a show about New England with WNPR. The final episode of the show was broadcast on May 27, 2021.

NENC was formed with a grant from the Corporation for Public Broadcasting in 2016.

The collaborative is composed of: lead station Connecticut Public Broadcasting, WBUR in Boston, Rhode Island Public Radio, Maine Public Broadcasting Network, New Hampshire Public Radio, Vermont Public Radio, WSHU Public Radio in Westport, Connecticut, and New England Public Radio in Amherst, Massachusetts.

NENC is built upon collaboration that has its roots in the Environmental Reporting Initiative started by WNPR in 2006.
