= Bob Heussler =

Bob Heussler (born Brooklyn, New York), currently resides in Hamden, Connecticut and is a radio sports broadcaster at WFAN in New York for thirty years. He made regular appearances on the Mike and the Mad Dog and Mike's On programs since 1993. He was the radio play-by-play voice of the WNBA's Connecticut Sun. Additionally, Bob broadcasts Fairfield Stags men's basketball on WVOF and has done play-by-play for University of Connecticut basketball and football for the Connecticut Radio Network. Heussler's radio call of Tate George's game-winning shot in the 1990 East Regional semifinals against Clemson is one of the most famous in college basketball history. Heussler is a 1977 graduate of the University of Bridgeport.

Most WFAN personalities refer to Heussler as "Mr. Met" because of his love of the New York Mets.

On Wednesday, January 19, 2011, Mike Francesa reported the death of Bob's wife Marcia Heussler after a long illness.
