= List of professional sports teams in Connecticut =

Connecticut was home to the WNBA's Connecticut Sun and several minor league sports teams, although it has not had a men's major league franchise since the Hartford Whalers of the NHL relocated to Raleigh, North Carolina in 1997.

== Baseball ==
- Hartford Yard Goats
  The Hartford Yard Goats are a minor league baseball team that was founded in 2015 when the New Britain Rock Cats relocated to Hartford. The franchise is a Colorado Rockies affiliate in the AA Eastern League. Their home stadium is Dunkin' Park.
- New Britain Bees
  The New Britain Bees are a collegiate summer baseball league team that was founded in 2015 when the New Britain Rock Cats relocated to Hartford. The franchise played in the Atlantic League of Professional Baseball from 2016 to 2019. They transferred to the Futures Collegiate Baseball League and have played there since. Their home stadium is New Britain Stadium.
- Norwich Sea Unicorns
  The Norwich Sea Unicorns are a collegiate summer baseball league team that was founded in 2010. They started out as the Connecticut Tigers of the New York-Penn League and were the Detroit Tigers affiliate. In 2019 the Tigers decided to change their name to the Norwich Sea Unicorns. The franchise was dropped by the MiLB in 2020 and then joined the Futures Collegiate Baseball League and have played there since. Their home stadium is Senator Thomas J. Dodd Memorial Stadium.
- Bristol Blues
  The Bristol Blues are a collegiate summer baseball league team that was founded in 2015. The franchise plays in the New England Collegiate Baseball League. Their home stadium is Muzzy Field.
- Mystic Schooners
  The Mystic Schooners are a collegiate summer baseball league team that plays in the New England Collegiate Baseball League. The team originally played their home games at Fitch High School's baseball field in Groton Ct from 2011 - 2021 until relocating to Dodd Stadium In Norwich in 2022.
- Danbury Westerners
  The Danbury Westerners are a collegiate summer baseball league team that plays in the New England Collegiate Baseball League. The team plays their home games at Rodgers Park in Danbury.
  • Connecticut Defenders
  The Connecticut defenders are a Minor league baseball team.

== Football ==
- Western Connecticut Hawks
  The (Western) Connecticut Hawks are a women's professional tackle football team in the Women's Football Alliance in Division III. The Hawks play at Kaplanis Memorial Fields in Danbury.
- Northern Connecticut Nightmare
  The Northern Connecticut Nightmare are a developmental women's tackle football team in the Women's Football Alliance. The Nightmare play at Windsor High School.

== Ice Hockey ==
- Bridgeport Islanders
  The Bridgeport Islanders were a hockey team based in Bridgeport, Connecticut that played in the American Hockey League (AHL). They were affiliated with the NHL's New York Islanders. They played their home games at Total Mortgage Arena.
- Hartford Wolf Pack
  The Hartford Wolf Pack is a hockey team based in Hartford that plays in the American Hockey League (AHL). They are affiliated with the New York Rangers of the NHL. They play their home games at the PeoplesBank Arena.
- Danbury Hat Tricks
  The Danbury Hat Tricks is a Single-A hockey team that plays in the Federal Prospects Hockey League. They play their games at the Danbury Ice Arena in Danbury, CT. The team is known for its rowdy fans who sit in section 102.

== Soccer ==
- Hartford Athletic
  The Hartford Athletic is a soccer team that plays in the USL Championship. They play their home matches at Trinity Health Stadium.
