= WECS =

- Windham, Connecticut; United States
- Broadcast area: Eastern Connecticut
- Frequency: 90.1 MHz

Programming
- Format: Variety
- Affiliations: Connecticut Public Radio; National Public Radio

Ownership
- Owner: Eastern Connecticut State University

History
- First air date: 1982
- Call sign meaning: Eastern Connecticut State

Technical information
- Licensing authority: FCC
- Facility ID: 18298
- Class: A
- ERP: 430 watts
- HAAT: 116 meters (381 ft)
- Transmitter coordinates: 41°41′0.4″N 72°12′59.3″W

Links
- Public license information: Public file; LMS
- Webcast: Listen live
- Website: www.easternct.edu/wecs-fm/index.html

WECS (90.1 FM) is a college radio station based in Windham, Connecticut, inside the Communication Building within Goddard Hall on the campus of Eastern Connecticut State University on Windham Street in Willimantic. The station broadcasts on 90.1 MHz with an effective radiated power (ERP) of 430 watts at a height above average terrain (HAAT) of 116 meters (381 ft).

WECS began in the 1970s as a turntable mounted in a 3x4' square of plywood which sat atop a work sink in a janitor's closet in an old dormitory. This was not a licensed station. It ran at approximately 10 watts and was a pirate broadcaster. At the time, Eastern Connecticut State University was not yet accredited as a university. In the late 1970s, a movement was afoot to get a legitimate radio station for the communications department. This was orchestrated by former WCBS announcer Prof. John Zatowski.

By 1982, test broadcasts had begun, and by 1984, WECS-FM was on air. In the succeeding decades, a number of long-time DJs have come and gone: Joe Standby, Bash, Robbo Retro, Alf ("The Alternative Xperience"), Mark E. Ramone, Beechnut, James 'DJ Ras J' McGurk, Gabriel Silverman and others. DJs who remain include Christine Guarneiri, Dean Farrell, Mike "The Dog" Piercy, Arthur Rovozzo, Tom Goodin, and Art Heriot. Despite the stations relatively minor stature, a good number of its staff have moved on to work in the media industry.

At present, WECS is a National Public Radio affiliate and John Zatowski the general manager. In July 2008, WECS moved into its new air studio.

== See also ==
- Campus radio
- Connecticut Public Radio
- Eastern Connecticut State University
- List of college radio stations in the United States
