= Where We Live =

- Genre: News / Talk
- Running time: c. 60 minutes
- Country of origin: United States
- Language: English
- Home station: WNPR
- Syndicates: Connecticut Public Radio
- Hosted by: Catherine Shen
- Produced by: Tess Terrible; Chloe Wynne
- Recording studio: Hartford, Connecticut
- Original release: June 2006 – present
- Website: Where We Live
- Podcast: Podcast

Where We Live is the award-winning flagship news and talk program for WNPR (Connecticut Public Radio). The program is currently hosted by Catherine Shen. Where We Live was originally created by John Dankosky in 2006. Dankosky hosted the show until he became Executive Editor of the New England News Collaborative. Lucy Nalpathanchil succeeded Dankosky as host in 2016 after which the show three national awards from the Public Media Journalists Association and a national Gracie Award in 2020. Nalpathanchil left the show in 2022 to become Vice President of Community Engagement for CT Public. The show format includes live listener participation through phone and social media as well as long-form interviews. It has been honored three times nationally as "Best Call-in Show" by PRNDI (Public Radio News Directors Inc.)

== Featured Guests ==
Where We Live has included numerous local and national guests such as Connecticut Governor Dannel Malloy, retired NBA player, Jason Collins, Connecticut Senators Chris Murphy and Richard Blumenthal, Neil DeGrasse Tyson, Dave Brubeck, Gloria Steinem, United States ambassador Robert Ford and others.
