= Faith Middleton =

American talk radio host

Faith Middleton (born 1948) is a retired public radio talk show host. She is best known as the former host of The Faith Middleton Show on Connecticut Public Radio.

In addition to her radio work, Faith hosted and produced several popular television series for Connecticut Public Television; one aired nationally. She was a regular contributor to NPR’s All Things Considered, Morning Edition, and Weekend Edition, and guest hosted NPR’s Fresh Air with Terry Gross.

== Personal life ==
Middleton was born in 1948 in Hartford. Her family moved numerous times over the years, due to her mother's work as a secretary and nanny to some of the nation's wealthiest families. Middleton graduated from Eastern Connecticut State University in 1971. An open lesbian, she celebrated her relationship with Fern Berman with a commitment ceremony in 2002, but the couple divorced in 2012.

== Professional life ==
After working as an editor and reporter at the Willimantic Chronicle, Manchester Journal-Inquirer, and Providence Journal, Middleton became editor-in-chief of Connecticut Magazine. She then moved to Connecticut Public Radio as cohost of On The Town.

In 1982, she started her own daily talk show, The Faith Middleton Show, and was its host and executive producer. In October 2015, Middleton's daily show ended, and she downscaled to producing only a weekly food show, The Faith Middleton Food Schmooze. The Food Schmooze ended its run in November 2019.

Middleton was named “Best Radio Talk Show Host” in the state by Connecticut Magazine for eleven consecutive years. In 2008, Faith Middleton was named a Hall of Fame recipient by Connecticut Magazine. In 2012, Middleton was inducted into the Connecticut Women's Hall of Fame.

Faith Middleton twice received the George Foster Peabody Award. She also received the Ohio State Award, the Mark Twain Award from the Connecticut Press Association, a Humanitarian Award from The Children’s Community Programs of Connecticut, and the Distinguished Public Service Award of The Connecticut Bar Association.

Middleton is the author of The Goodness of Ordinary People, a book of true stories from her WNPR callers, demonstrating what she describes as “the uncelebrated breadth of humanity frequently present in secular life.”

Middleton described her work as “a never-ending exploration of the richness of life,” conducting interviews she hoped would enlighten as well as entertain. The subjects included culture, food, sustainability, news, politics, entertainment, poverty, community issues, architecture, work, leisure, design, science, sports, education, religion, history, medicine, humanity, and art.

For many years, she chaired the Celebration of Connecticut Farms along with co-chairs Meryl Streep, Paul Newman, Jacques Pepin, and Sam Waterston. She twice co-chaired The Connecticut Audubon Society Eagle Festival with Phil Donahue.

She occasionally wrote as a columnist and freelance writer. Her articles have appeared in The New York Times, Hartford Courant, San Jose Mercury News, St. Louis Post Dispatch, Ms. Magazine, and Connecticut Magazine.

Middleton was awarded an honorary doctorate by Charter Oak University and was an Associate Fellow at Yale University, where she taught a class called The Art of the Interview.
