= Connecticut Sun =

American professional basketball team in Uncasville, Connecticut

- Conference: Eastern
- Leagues: WNBA
- Founded: 1999
- History: Orlando Miracle; 1999–2002; Connecticut Sun; 2003–2026; Houston Comets; 2027–present
- Arena: Mohegan Sun Arena
- Location: Montville, Connecticut
- Team colors: Orange, navy blue, white
- Main sponsor: Yale New Haven Health System
- Championships: 0
- Conference titles: 2 (2004, 2005) (Note: The WNBA awarded conference championships to the winners of the Conference Finals in the playoffs from 1998 to 2015.)
- Website: sun.wnba.com
| Heroine | Explorer | Rebel |

The Connecticut Sun were an American professional basketball team based in Uncasville, Connecticut. The Sun compete in the Women's National Basketball Association (WNBA) as a member of the Eastern Conference.

The team was established as the Orlando Miracle in 1999, during the league's expansion from ten to twelve teams, as a sister team to the NBA's Orlando Magic. In 2003, as financial strains left the team on the brink of disbanding, the Mohegan Indian tribe purchased and relocated the team to Mohegan Sun, becoming the first Native American tribe to own a professional sports franchise. The team's name came from its affiliation with Mohegan Sun and its logo was reflective of a modern interpretation of an ancient Mohegan symbol. Capitalizing on the popularity of women's basketball in the state, as a result of the success of the UConn Huskies, the Sun held the distinction of being the only WNBA franchise not to share its market with an NBA team, until the relocation of the Seattle SuperSonics in 2008 left the Storm as an independent team in Seattle. The San Antonio Stars also joined these two teams in this distinction when they relocated to Las Vegas before the 2018 season.

The Sun qualified for the WNBA playoffs in 15 of their 21 seasons in Connecticut. Despite this, they were the oldest remaining franchise without a championship title.

On March 27, 2026, sources told ESPN that the Fertitta family, owners of the NBA's Houston Rockets, agreed to purchase the Connecticut Sun and relocate them to Houston, where they would be renamed the Houston Comets.

The Sun played their last game in franchise history on September 24, 2026.

The Sun was the last major league professional sports team based in Connecticut.

== History ==
=== Orlando Miracle (1999–2002) ===
Before the franchise relocated to Connecticut in 2003, the team operated as the Orlando Miracle. The Miracle played their home games at TD Waterhouse Centre in Orlando, Florida, as the sister team of the Orlando Magic. After the 2002 season, the NBA sold off all of the WNBA franchises to the operators of the respective teams, which placed the league in the middle of team contractions, relocations, and potential labor strife. Since Magic ownership was no longer interested in retaining the rights to the Miracle and no local partnership was reached, the organization ceased operations and was purchased by the Mohegan Tribe. On January 28, 2003, it was announced that the Miracle would immediately move to Uncasville, Connecticut and change its nickname to the Sun (in reference to the Mohegan Sun casino). The Sun's nickname, color scheme and logo were similar to that of another defunct Florida-based franchise, the Miami Sol, which folded at the same time as the Miracle's relocation to Connecticut.

=== Relocation and ascendancy to prominence (2003–2004) ===
The former Sun alternate logo.

With a new home in Uncasville and two former UConn Huskies on the roster, the Sun entered the 2003 season looking to build upon a 2002 campaign in which they missed the playoffs due to a tiebreaker with Indiana. The Sun underwent a total overhaul during the off-season – selecting Debbie Black in the dispersal draft and acquiring former Connecticut star Rebecca Lobo to add another local attraction to join Nykesha Sales. General manager Chris Sienko named Mike Thibault, a coaching veteran with two NBA titles as an assistant coach for the Los Angeles Lakers, as the first head coach for the franchise.

On May 24, 2003, the Sun hosted the first regular season game of its inaugural season, which was shown on ABC, the league's new broadcast partner. The Sun yielded to the two-time defending champion Sparks before a sellout crowd of 9,341. At the conclusion of the 2003 season, the Sun finished with an 18–16 record, which clinched the first playoff berth since the franchise relocated. The Sun swept the second-seeded Sting in the first round of the playoffs, and before being swept by the Detroit Shock in the Eastern Conference Finals.

Rebecca Lobo announced her retirement after seven seasons in the WNBA. The Sun returned Katie Douglas, Nykesha Sales and Taj McWilliams-Franklin, the group that formed Thibault's nucleus. General manager Chris Sienko fortified that core with former UConn product Asjha Jones, who was acquired in a three-team trade, and Minnesota Golden Gophers phenom Lindsay Whalen, who was taken with the fourth overall pick in the 2004 Draft. The Sun managed to snag a top pick in one of the deepest draft classes in league history by trading perennial all-star point guard Shannon Johnson. The Sun selected Lindsay Whalen amidst rumors they would trade her to the Minnesota Lynx. However, she remained on the team as the Sun posted an 18–16 record in an equally-talented Eastern Conference, winning the #1 seed. In the first round, the Sun defeated the Washington Mystics 2–1. In the Eastern Conference Finals, the Sun rolled on, sweeping the New York Liberty. The Sun had made it to the WNBA Finals in their second season of existence. In the Finals, their run would end, as they lost a hard-fought three-game series, 2–1, to the Seattle Storm.

=== Dynastic turmoil (2005–2007) ===
In the 2005 offseason, the Sun acquired 7'2" (2.18 m) center Margo Dydek. With a dominant post presence, the Sun controlled the Eastern Conference, posting a 26–8 record, the best regular season record for an Eastern Conference team in WNBA history. In the playoffs, the Sun flew to the finals, sweeping the Detroit Shock and the Indiana Fever. In the 2005 WNBA Finals, the Sun were matched up against an equally dominant Sacramento Monarchs team while having to deal with injuries to Lindsay Whalen. Despite having home-court advantage, the Sun lost in four games in the first ever best-of-five format WNBA Finals.

Mohegan Sun Arena filling up before a game.

The success of the franchise was rewarded in 2005, when the Sun were selected to host the annual WNBA All-Star Game. Sun coach Mike Thibault served as coach for the Eastern Conference, which lost 122-99. At the end of the game, Lisa Leslie became the first woman to ever dunk in an All-Star Game.

In 2006, the Sun would match their 2005 record. Mike Thibault received the WNBA Coach of the Year Award while all five starters were named to the WNBA Eastern Conference All-Star team: Katie Douglas, Margo Dydek, Taj McWilliams-Franklin, Nykesha Sales and Lindsay Whalen. In the playoffs, the Sun beat the Washington Mystics 76–61 in the first game and 68–65 in the second. But in the Eastern Conference Finals, the Sun lost to the Detroit Shock 1–3, where Connecticut hosted the last game.

The Sun stumbled out of the gate in 2007, posting a dismal 5–10 record by late June. However, the Sun stormed back into playoff contention by winning 11 of their next 13 games, to finish the regular season at 18–16, enough to win the #3 seed in the Eastern Conference. In the playoffs, the Sun faced the Indiana Fever in the first round. The Sun came into the series having won all four regular season contests against the Fever. In game 1, despite holding a 17-point lead in the third quarter, the Fever raced back to force overtime. The game went into three overtimes, the first time it had happened in WNBA playoff history, ending with a 93–88 victory for the Sun. However, the Fever would respond by winning the next two games and therefore the series, including a playoff record 22-point come-from-behind win in Game 3.

=== Brief decline (2008–2009) ===
During the 2007–08 offseason, the Connecticut Sun made major changes to their roster in an effort to win that ever-elusive championship title. The Sun made three trades, one sending Katie Douglas to the Indiana Fever. In return, the Sun received Tamika Whitmore. Following the monumental trade, Nykesha Sales announced she would sit out the 2008 season due to multiple nagging injuries. 7'2" center Margo Dydek also took the season off due to her pregnancy.

With a lineup with three new starters, the Sun started the season by winning eight of their first nine games. The team did slow in progression by losing five games in a row at one point, but they finished the regular season with a 21–13 record, which placed them second in the Eastern Conference, only one game out of first place. In the playoffs, the New York Liberty won the decisive game three on the Sun's home floor and for the second straight year, the Sun failed to advance to the Eastern Conference Finals.

The 2009 WNBA All-Star Game was held on July 25 at Mohegan Sun Arena, the second time the Sun had hosted the game. It was broadcast nationally on ABC. The 2009 season would prove to be a middling one for the team, which fought to stay around .500 the entire season. An injury to Asjha Jones did not help their chances, and the team ultimately finished 16–18, which was the same record as the Washington Mystics and Chicago Sky for fourth place, but Washington won the tiebreaker to advance.

=== Charles triggers resurgence (2010–2012) ===
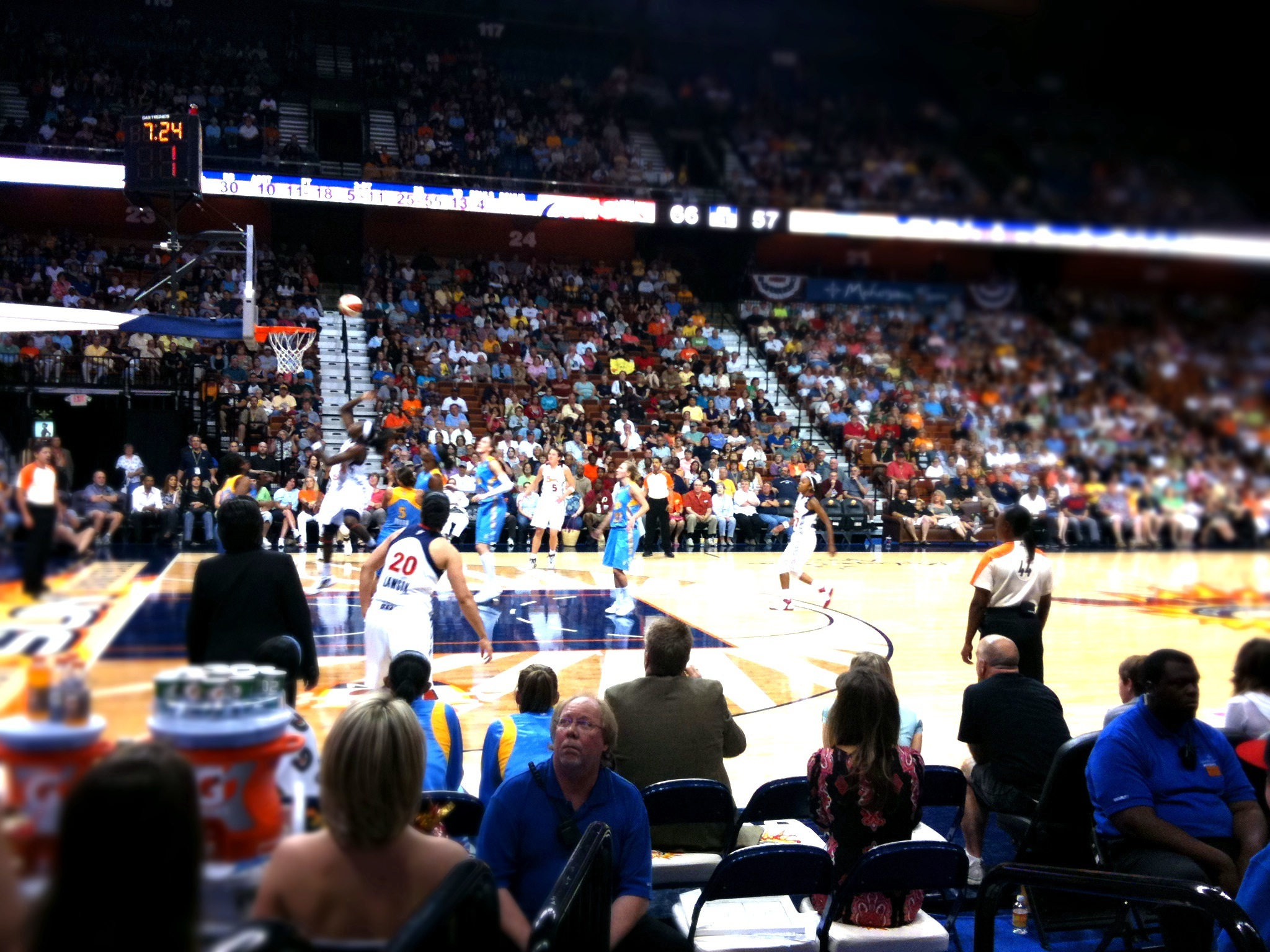
A Sun game in 2011

Connecticut started its rebuilding process by acquiring DeMya Walker in the dispersal draft of the Sacramento Monarchs, which was held on December 14, 2009. The Sun then snagged the first overall pick in the 2010 collegiate draft in a trade with the Minnesota Lynx; a trade that saw Lindsay Whalen along with the second overall pick traded to Minneapolis. This package netted the Sun Renee Montgomery. Thibault continued to reshape his roster after introducing Kara Lawson at a press conference as a new member of the Sun. Lawson, along with Montgomery was meant to shape a formidable backcourt, which would go with their plans in signing reserves Anete Jēkabsone-Žogota and Tan White.

The Sun came into the 2010 WNBA draft with two picks in the first round – the first and seventh overall picks, the latter of which was acquired one day prior to the draft from the Tulsa Shock. With its first overall selection in franchise history, the Sun took UConn standout and Player of the Year recipient, Tina Charles, the consensus top prospect available. To diminish the losses of Amber Holt and Chante Black, both of whom were part of the package deal with the Shock, the Sun selected Kansas product Danielle McCray. Prior to the draft, it was understood that McCray wouldn't be available to participate in the upcoming season due to an ACL injury she sustained in college. There was risk involved concerning her durability, but McCray's potential as a superstar was reason enough to take the leap of faith. The Sun cemented its guard corps with the selection of Allison Hightower in the second round. He then nabbed former Cornhusker Kelsey Griffin, who was taken third overall, in a trade once again involving the Lynx. This trade would have the Sun relinquishing their first and second round picks in next year's draft. After the 2010 WNBA season (after going 17-17 and missing the playoffs), news surfaced that the Connecticut Sun was the first franchise in WNBA history to turn a profit.

The 2011 season started well for the Sun. Few changes were made in the off-season, which gave the team some consistency and a year of experience on which to build. Sandrine Gruda and Anete Jēkabsone-Žogota decided to sit out the season, so the Sun looked elsewhere, adding Jessica Moore. In a tough Eastern Conference, the Sun held a 9–5 record going into the All-Star break and finished 21–13 before losing in the Conference Semifinals. The 2012 offseason saw them try to build their team in small ways with a free agency approach – making small waves to pry Thompson and Cash from their respective teams and then getting forward Mistie Mims The team had won 13 of their first 17 games before finishing 25–9 to finish 1st in the Eastern Conference.

The Sun fended off the Liberty in two close semifinal games to face the Indiana Fever in what was the team's first Conference finals since 2010. They won Game 1 76–64 in Connecticut to find themselves one win away from the Finals. However, the Fever struck back with a close victory in Game 2 that saw Shavonte Zellous hit a two-point jump shot with 0.5 seconds remaining to provide the winning points in a 78–76 loss. Back in Connecticut, the Fever got onto a hot start and the Sun (who missed their first thirteen shots from the 3-point line) never recovered. The Fever, who had never won a road elimination playoff game, won 87–71. After the season, Tina Charles was named WNBA Most Valuable Player Award while Montgomery was named WNBA Sixth Woman of the Year Award. On November 20, Thibault (along with his two assistants) was fired with one year remaining on his contract; he had gone 206–134 in ten seasons as coach.

=== Change at the top (2013–2016) ===
With an eye to accomplishing the objective of a WNBA title, the team hired Hall of Famer Anne Donovan as Thibault's successor. Among other WNBA stints, Donovan was the head coach of the 2004 Seattle Storm team that captured the league title over Connecticut. Donovan hired Catherine Proto and Jennifer Gillom as her assistant coaches for her initial season. In 2014, Proto became Scouting and Video Operations Manager for the Sun and Steven Key replaced her as an assistant coach. During Anne Donovan's run as head coach, she would go 38–64 in three seasons with the Connecticut Sun before resigning as the head coach in 2015. Curt Miller would be named head coach of the Connecticut Sun starting in 2016.

During this period, the Sun also hosted two more WNBA All-Star Games at Mohegan Sun Arena. Connecticut acted as host for the 2013 and 2015 contests.

=== A new era (2016–2024) ===
With Curt Miller at the helm, changes were made. Elizabeth Williams was sent to the Atlanta Dream for the 2016 fourth overall pick in Rachel Banham. In April 2016, the Sun traded Chelsea Gray to the Los Angeles Sparks along with two second round picks in the 2016 WNBA Draft and a 2017 first round pick for Jonquel Jones and the Sparks second round selection in the 2016 WNBA Draft. In the 2016 WNBA Draft, the Connecticut Sun selected Morgan Tuck with their third overall draft pick. After getting three wins in sixteen games on the 2016 season, the Sun moved Kelsey Bone to the Phoenix Mercury for Courtney Williams and a second round draft selection in the 2017 WNBA Draft. Closing out the 2016 WNBA Season the Sun would win eleven out of the remaining twenty games to finish with a record of 14–20, missing out on the postseason by three wins.

In February 2017, the Sun would trade Camille Little to the Phoenix Mercury for Lynetta Kizer from the Indiana Fever and eighth overall draft selection Brionna Jones in the 2017 WNBA Draft from a three team trade. Ahead of the 2017 WNBA Season, Chiney Ogwumike was suspended due to an injury she suffered overseas causing her to miss the 2017 WNBA Season. By the halfway point of the season, they were 10–7. By the end of the season, they had won 21 games with 13 losses to narrowly finish one game out of 1st place in the East to reach their first postseason in five years. In the one-game Second Round, they lost to the Phoenix Mercury 88–83. Chiney returned to action in the 2018 WNBA Season while Stricklen resigned for another run with the Connecticut Sun.

The 2019 team continued on the run from last year, as they finished with a 23–11 record to finish as the second best team in the league overall and earn a bye to the Semifinals. In the best-of-five round, they won in a three-game sweep over the Los Angeles Sparks to meet the Washington Mystics, now coached by former Sun Mike Thibault. In the first WNBA Finals in Connecticut in 14 years, with the #1 Mystics having home-court advantage. The teams split the first two games before Washington won Game 3 94–81. A sixteen-point halftime lead for the Sun in Game 4 proved important when the attempted comeback of the Mystics came short in a 90–86 decision. In Game 5, the Sun led by two points going into the final quarter. However, the Mystics overpowered them with 27 fourth quarter points to the 14 of the Sun to win 89–78 for the championship.

The 2020 season was meant to have a new record of games played with 36. However, the COVID-19 pandemic forced the WNBA to announce a change to the plan that would instead see 22 games played without fans at IMG Academy in Florida. In a twelve-team league that would see eight teams make the playoffs, the Sun went 10–12 to make it as the seventh seed. They won the first two playoff games to reach the Semifinals against the Las Vegas Aces. They won two of the first three games to be on the verge of the WNBA Finals. However, they lost 75–84 and 63–66 to fall short.

The 2021 team returned with 32 games played where they lost only six times to clinch the #1 overall seed. The 26 wins tied a franchise record and gave them a bye to the Semifinals. They met the Chicago Sky, who beat them as a #6 seed by winning in four games, which included a 101–95 Game 1 win in double overtime.

In 2022, now with the 36-game schedule, the Sun went 25–11 to finish 3rd. They beat the Dallas Wings in the First Round to make the Semifinals, where they narrowly beat the Chicago Sky in five games to reach the WNBA Finals for the second time in four seasons. Facing the #1 seed Las Vegas Aces, the Aces narrowly won Game 1 67–64 and then rolled to a 14-point win in Game 2. The Sun scored 105 points in Game 3 back home, but the Aces prevailed in Game 4 78–71 to win the championship.

[Needs information on 2023 and 2024 playoff runs, with update to summary about how many seasons they reached the playoffs.]

=== Sale of the team (2025–2026) ===
In early 2025, during free agency, the Sun traded away three of their previous starting five players while DeWanna Bonner signed with the Indiana Fever and the Phoenix Mercury acquired Alyssa Thomas in a sign and trade deal. It marked the first time in WNBA history that a starting five was completely dismantled after a playoff appearance.

On May 12, 2025, Sportico reported that the Mohegan tribe had retained investment bank Allen & Company to explore a sale of the team, with Sportico commenting that a relocation out of Connecticut was "likely." On August 2, 2025, The Boston Globe reported that Boston Celtics minority owner Stephen Pagliuca would purchase the Sun with the intent of relocating the team to Boston by 2027. That following day, however, the Hartford Courant reported that Marc Lasry, a Connecticut native and former co-owner of the Milwaukee Bucks, made a bid to buy the team, which would move them to Hartford. The WNBA was reportedly unwilling to accept either bid on the grounds that neither city had applied for an expansion team during the most recent round of expansion. Instead, it was reported that the WNBA preferred that, should the Sun be sold, that it be sold to ownership tied to nine cities that had recently made unsuccessful bids for expansion teams, specifically Houston Rockets owner Tilman Fertitta or Cleveland Cavaliers owner Dan Gilbert. On September 4, ESPN reported that the state of Connecticut sent a proposal of its own to purchase a minority stake in the Sun, which would allow the construction of a practice facility and a limited slate of games at PeoplesBank Arena in Hartford.

Amid reports regarding the sale, Connecticut state officials, including Governor Ned Lamont and State Comptroller Sean Scanlon, expressed support for the Sun remaining in Connecticut while criticizing the WNBA for their alleged desire to move the team out of New England, and fans campaigned to keep them from leaving the state. On September 8, Senator Richard Blumenthal sent a letter to WNBA Commissioner Cathy Engelbert urging the WNBA not to interfere with sale negotiations, warning that such actions could be considered violations of antitrust law, followed on September 11 by a letter of inquiry from Attorney General William Tong requesting information regarding the league's rules, regulations, and the Sun's valuations. On September 16, NBA commissioner Adam Silver defended the WNBA's role in the negotiations, claiming that a sale with the intent to relocate was a violation of league rules, and reiterated that neither Boston nor Hartford had applied for an expansion team, despite the latter city being within the Sun's exclusive marketing territory, which Blumenthal had previously stated meant that requiring Hartford to apply for expansion made no sense.

On December 19, ESPN reported that the Sun and Rockets owner Tilman Fertitta were nearing an agreement for a sale that would result in the Sun relocating to Houston, which last hosted the Houston Comets from 1997 until the team folded in 2008.

On March 27, 2026, the Associated Press reported that Fertitta agreed to purchase the Sun and relocate the franchise to Houston, where they would take on the Comets name upon approval from the WNBA Board of Governors. On May 13, 2026, the WNBA and NBA Boards of Governors unanimously approved the sale of the Sun to Fertitta and the franchise's relocation to Houston, where the team would revive the Houston Comets name beginning with the 2027 season.

=== Final home ===
The Sun played in the Mohegan Sun Arena, located in the center of the mall area of the Mohegan Sun in Uncasville, Connecticut. The venue was owned by the Mohegan Tribe. Mohegan Sun Arena was smaller than most other WNBA arenas, with the maximum capacity (lower and upper levels) for a basketball game being 9,323. The Sun was the only top-level professional sports franchises located in the state of Connecticut. The New England Black Wolves of the National Lacrosse League formerly shared the Mohegan Sun Arena with the Sun until their relocation in 2020

=== Uniforms ===
- 1999–2002: For home games, the Miracle wore white with blue on the sides/shoulders and white Miracle logo text on the chest. For away games, blue with white on the sides and white Miracle logo text on the chest. The Miracle logo is on the shorts.
- 2003: For home games, the Sun wore white with sun red on the sides and red Sun logo text emblazoned on the chest. For away games, pure red with gold trim on the sides and gold Sun logo text on the chest. The Sun logo is on the shorts.
- 2004–2006: For home games, the Sun wore white with sun red on the sides and red Sun logo text on the chest. For away games, blue with sun red and gold trim on the sides, as well as gold Sun logo text on the chest. The Sun logo is on the shorts.
- 2007: For home games, the Sun wore white with images of basic suns embellished on the sides and the Sun logo text on the chest. For away games, blue with images of basic suns on the sides and gold Sun logo text on the chest. The Sun logo is on the shorts.
- 2008–2010: For home games, the Sun wore white with the word "Connecticut" printed vertically on the sides and the Sun logo text emblazoned on the chest. For away games, the Sun wore blue with the word "Sun" printed vertically on the sides and the gold "Connecticut" text on the chest. The Sun logo is on the shorts.
- 2011–2015: For home games, the Sun wear white with yellow vertical stripes on the sides and the Sun logo text emblazoned on the chest. For away games, the Sun wear blue with white vertical stripes embellished on the sides and gold "Connecticut" text on the chest. The Sun logo is shown on the left shoulder.
- 2015–2026: Frontier Communications took over as jersey sponsor.
- 2016: As part of a league-wide initiative for its 20th season, all games featured all-color uniform matchups. Therefore, the Sun unveiled an orange uniform while retaining the blue jersey from the previous season.
- 2021–2026: As a third jersey (known as the "Rebel Edition", the Mohegan Tribe added the word Keesusk (the Mohegan language word for sun) on the front in white text. The jersey was blue in honor of Gladys Tantaquidgeon, the tribe's medicine woman who passed in 2005, at the age of 106. The edging on the sleeves of the third jersey featured repeating symbols which represent the path of life and the icons on the neckline portray canoes once used by the tribe.

== Season-by-season records ==
| Season | Team | Conference | | Regular season | | | Playoff results | Head coach |
| Season | Team | Conference | | W | L | PCT | Playoff results | Head coach |
|---|---|---|---|---|---|---|---|---|
Orlando Miracle
| 1999 | 1999 | East | 4th | 15 | 17 | .469 | Did not qualify | Carolyn Peck |
| 2000 | 2000 | East | 3rd | 16 | 16 | .500 | Lost Conference Semifinals (Cleveland, 1–2) | Carolyn Peck |
| 2001 | 2001 | East | 5th | 13 | 19 | .406 | Did not qualify | Carolyn Peck |
| 2002 | 2002 | East | 5th | 16 | 16 | .500 | Did not qualify | Dee Brown |
Connecticut Sun
| 2003 | 2003 | East | 3rd | 18 | 16 | .529 | Won Conference Semifinals (Charlotte, 2–0); Lost Conference Finals (Detroit, 0–2) | Mike Thibault |
| 2004 | 2004 | East | 1st | 18 | 16 | .529 | Won Conference Semifinals (Washington, 2–1); Won Conference Finals (New York, 2–0); Lost WNBA Finals (Seattle, 1–2) | Mike Thibault |
| 2005 | 2005 | East | 1st | 26 | 8 | .765 | Won Conference Semifinals (Detroit, 2–0); Won Conference Finals (Indiana, 2–0); Lost WNBA Finals (Sacramento, 1–3) | Mike Thibault |
| 2006 | 2006 | East | 1st | 26 | 8 | .765 | Won Conference Semifinals (Washington, 2–0); Lost Conference Finals (Detroit, 1–2) | Mike Thibault |
| 2007 | 2007 | East | 3rd | 18 | 16 | .529 | Lost Conference Semifinals (Indiana, 1–2) | Mike Thibault |
| 2008 | 2008 | East | 2nd | 21 | 13 | .618 | Lost Conference Semifinals (New York, 1–2) | Mike Thibault |
| 2009 | 2009 | East | 6th | 16 | 18 | .471 | Did not qualify | Mike Thibault |
| 2010 | 2010 | East | 5th | 17 | 17 | .500 | Did not qualify | Mike Thibault |
| 2011 | 2011 | East | 2nd | 21 | 13 | .618 | Lost Conference Semifinals (Atlanta, 0–2) | Mike Thibault |
| 2012 | 2012 | East | 1st | 25 | 9 | .735 | Won Conference Semifinals (New York, 2–0); Lost Conference Finals (Indiana, 1–2) | Mike Thibault |
| 2013 | 2013 | East | 6th | 10 | 24 | .294 | Did not qualify | Anne Donovan |
| 2014 | 2014 | East | 6th | 13 | 21 | .382 | Did not qualify | Anne Donovan |
| 2015 | 2015 | East | 6th | 15 | 19 | .441 | Did not qualify | Anne Donovan |
| 2016 | 2016 | East | 5th | 14 | 20 | .412 | Did not qualify | Curt Miller |
| 2017 | 2017 | East | 2nd | 21 | 13 | .656 | Lost Second Round (Phoenix, 0–1) | Curt Miller |
| 2018 | 2018 | East | 3rd | 21 | 13 | .656 | Lost Second Round (Phoenix, 0–1) | Curt Miller |
| 2019 | 2019 | East | 2nd | 23 | 11 | .676 | Won Semifinals (Los Angeles, 3–0); Lost WNBA Finals (Washington, 2–3) | Curt Miller |
| 2020 | 2020 | East | 2nd | 10 | 12 | .455 | Won First Round (Chicago, 1–0); Won Second Round (Los Angeles, 1–0); Lost Semifinals (Las Vegas, 2–3) | Curt Miller |
| 2021 | 2021 | East | 1st | 26 | 6 | .813 | Lost Semifinals (Chicago, 1–3) | Curt Miller |
| 2022 | 2022 | East | 2nd | 25 | 11 | .694 | Won First Round (Dallas, 2–1); Won Semifinals (Chicago, 3–2); Lost WNBA Finals (Las Vegas, 1–3) | Curt Miller |
| 2023 | 2023 | East | 2nd | 27 | 13 | .675 | Won First Round (Minnesota, 2–1); Lost Semifinals (New York, 1–3) | Stephanie White |
| 2024 | 2024 | East | 2nd | 28 | 12 | .700 | Won First Round (Indiana, 2–0); Lost Semifinals (Minnesota, 2–3) | Stephanie White |
| 2025 | 2025 | East | 5th | 11 | 33 | .250 | Did not qualify | Rachid Meziane |
| 2026 | 2026 | East | T-6th | 11 | 33 | .250 | Did not qualify | Rachid Meziane |
| Regular season | | | | 462 | 384 | .562 | 2 Conference Championships | |
| Playoffs | | | | 44 | 44 | .500 | 0 WNBA Championships | |

== Final roster ==
2026 Connecticut Sun roster
Players
Coaches

| Pos. | No. | Nat. | Name | Height | Weight | DOB | From | Yrs |
|---|---|---|---|---|---|---|---|---|
| F | 33 | (France) | Angloma, Nell | 6' 1" (1.85m) | | 2006-06-12 | France | R |
| F | 15 | (United States) | Beers, Raegan | 6' 4" (1.93m) | 244 lb (111kg) | 2004-07-23 | Oklahoma | R |
| G/F | 25 | (United States) | Burke, Kennedy | 6' 1" (1.85m) | 199 lb (90kg) | 1997-02-14 | UCLA | 6 |
| F | 8 | (Canada) | Edwards, Aaliyah | 6' 3" (1.91m) | 206 lb (93kg) | 2002-07-09 | Connecticut | 2 |
| C | 42 | (United States) | Griner, Brittney | 6' 9" (2.06m) | 219 lb (99kg) | 1990-10-18 | Baylor | 11 |
| G | 3 | (United States) | Jackson, Ashlon | 6' 0" (1.83m) | 170 lb (77kg) | 2004-01-06 | Duke | R |
| G | 5 | (United States) | Kneepkens, Gianna | 5' 11" (1.8m) | 174 lb (79kg) | 2003-03-04 | UCLA | R |
| G | 47 | (France) | Lacan, Leïla | 5' 11" (1.8m) | | 2004-06-02 | France | 1 |
| G | 4 | (New Zealand) | Leger-Walker, Charlisse | 5' 10" (1.78m) | 190 lb (86kg) | 2001-09-15 | UCLA | R |
| F/C | 13 | (United States) | Marshall, Rayah | 6' 4" (1.93m) | | 2003-10-15 | USC | 1 |
| F | 1 | (United States) | Miller, Diamond | 6' 1" (1.85m) | 178 lb (81kg) | 2001-02-11 | Maryland | 3 |
| C | 10 | (United States) | Nelson-Ododa, Olivia | 6' 5" (1.96m) | 179 lb (81kg) | 2000-08-17 | Connecticut | 3 |
| G | 22 | (United States) | Rivers, Saniya | 6' 1" (1.85m) | 159 lb (72kg) | 2003-03-04 | NC State | 1 |
| G | 2 | (United States) | Van Lith, Hailey | 5' 9" (1.75m) | 157 lb (71kg) | 2001-09-09 | TCU | 1 |

Head coach
(France) Rachid Meziane
Assistant coaches
(Belgium) Pascal Angillis
(United States) Roneeka Hodges (Florida State)
(United States) Ashlee McGee (Austin Peay)
Player development
(United States) Kevin Owens (Trinity University)
(United States) Bak Sawi (Allegany College of Maryland)
Athletic trainer
(United States) Terri Acosta (North Texas)
Assistant trainer
(United States) Brianna Robinson (FIU)
Strength and conditioning coach
(United States) Analisse Rios (Connecticut College)

Legend

- (C) Team captain
- (DP) Unsigned draft pick
- (FA) Free agent
- (S) Suspended
- Injured

WNBA roster page

=== International rights ===
| Nationality | Name | Years pro | Last played | Drafted |
| (Mali) | Astan Dabo | 0 | N/A | 2012 |
| (United Kingdom) | Johannah Leedham | 0 | N/A | 2010 |
| (Spain) | Alba Torrens | 0 | N/A | 2009 |

=== Honored numbers ===
Connecticut Sun honored numbers
| No. | Player | Position | Tenure |
| 12 | Margo Dydek | C | 2005–07 |
| 13 | Lindsay Whalen | G | 2004–09 |
| 23 | Katie Douglas | G/F | 2001–07 |
| 42 | Nykesha Sales | F | 1999–2007 |

=== FIBA Hall of Fame ===
Connecticut Sun Hall of Famers
Players
| No. | Name | Position | Tenure | Inducted |
|---|---|---|---|---|
| 12 | Margo Dydek | C | 2005–07 | 2019 |

== Management, coaches and staff ==
=== Owners ===
- RDV Sports, Inc., owner of the Orlando Magic (1998–2002)
- Mohegan Sun (2003–2026)
- Tilman Fertitta, owner of the Houston Comets (2027–present)

=== Head coaches ===
Connecticut Sun head coaches
| Name | Start | End | Seasons | Regular season | | | | Playoffs | | | |
| Name | Start | End | Seasons | W | L | PCT | G | W | L | PCT | G |
|---|---|---|---|---|---|---|---|---|---|---|---|
| Carolyn Peck | July 6, 1998 | April 3, 2002 | 4 | 44 | 52 | .458 | 96 | 1 | 2 | .333 | 3 |
| Dee Brown | April 5, 2002 | End of 2002 | 1 | 16 | 16 | .500 | 32 | 0 | 0 | .000 | 0 |
| Mike Thibault | March 7, 2003 | November 20, 2012 | 10 | 206 | 134 | .606 | 340 | 20 | 18 | .526 | 38 |
| Anne Donovan | January 3, 2013 | October 1, 2015 | 3 | 38 | 64 | .373 | 102 | 0 | 0 | .000 | 0 |
| Curt Miller | December 17, 2015 | October 21, 2022 | 7 | 136 | 86 | .613 | 190 | 16 | 17 | .485 | 33 |
| Stephanie White | December 9, 2022 | October 28, 2024 | 2 | 55 | 25 | .688 | 80 | 7 | 7 | .500 | 14 |
| Rachid Meziane | December 4, 2024 | present | 2 | 11 | 33 | .250 | 44 | 0 | 0 | – | 0 |

=== General managers ===
- Carolyn Peck (1998–2001)
- Dee Brown (2002)
- Chris Sienko (2003–2016)
- Curt Miller (2016–2022)
- Darius Taylor (2023–2024)
- Morgan Tuck (2024–present); now at Houston Comets

=== Assistant coaches ===
- Rick Stukes (1999–2000)
- Charlene Thomas-Swinson (1999–2001)
- Michael Peck (2001)
- Vonn Read (2002)
- Valerie Still (2002)
- Bernadette Mattox (2003–2012)
- Scott Hawk (2003–2012)
- Catherine Proto (2013)
- Jennifer Gillom (2013–2015)
- Steven Key (2014–2015)
- Nicki Collen (2016–2017)
- Steve Smith (2016–2018)
- Brandi Poole (2018–2022)
- Chris Koclanes (2019–2022)
- Abi Olajuwon (2023–2024)
- Briann January (2023–2024)
- Austin Kelly (2023–2024)
- Roneeka Hodges (2025–present); now at Houston Comets
- Ashlee McGee (2025–present); now at Houston Comets
- Pascal Angillis (2025–present); now at Houston Comets

== Statistics ==
Connecticut Sun statistics
1990s

| Season | Individual | | | Team vs Opponents | | |
| Season | PPG | RPG | APG | PPG | RPG | FG% |
|---|---|---|---|---|---|---|
| 1999 | S. Johnson (14.0) | T. McWilliams (7.5) | S. Johnson (4.4) | 68.9 vs 69.3 | 30.2 vs 31.4 | .424 vs .429 |

2000s

| Season | Individual | | | Team vs Opponents | | |
| Season | PPG | RPG | APG | PPG | RPG | FG% |
|---|---|---|---|---|---|---|
| 2000 | T. McWilliams (13.7) | T. McWilliams (7.6) | S. Johnson (5.3) | 69.0 vs 69.8 | 28.9 vs 31.8 | .436 vs .433 |
| 2001 | N. Sales (13.5) | T. McWilliams (7.6) | E. Powell (3.1) | 66.9 vs 68.9 | 30.3 vs 30.5 | .401 vs .440 |
| 2002 | S. Johnson (16.1) | W. Palmer (5.8) | S. Johnson (5.3) | 70.4 vs 70.5 | 28.6 vs 32.7 | .422 vs .432 |
| 2003 | N. Sales (16.1) | T. McWilliams (6.7) | S. Johnson (5.8) | 70.1 vs 70.9 | 32.2 vs 34.6 | .411 vs .411 |
| 2004 | N. Sales (15.2) | T. McWilliams (7.2) | L. Whalen (4.8) | 68.7 vs 67.8 | 30.7 vs 31.3 | .427 vs .430 |
| 2005 | N. Sales (15.6) | T. McWilliams (7.3) | L. Whalen (5.1) | 72.8 vs 66.0 | 32.6 vs 31.7 | .452 vs .398 |
| 2006 | K. Douglas (16.4) | T. McWilliams (9.6) | L. Whalen (4.6) | 78.9 vs 71.1 | 37.3 vs 33.9 | .443 vs .402 |
| 2007 | K. Douglas (17.0) | M. Dydek (6.5) | L. Whalen (5.0) | 78.7 vs 76.3 | 35.9 vs 34.7 | .430 vs .421 |
| 2008 | A. Jones (17.0) | A. Jones (6.1) | L. Whalen (5.4) | 79.1 vs 74.7 | 36.4 vs 35.3 | .422 vs .418 |
| 2009 | A. Jones (16.7) | S. Gruda (6.3) | L. Whalen (4.6) | 78.0 vs 78.1 | 34.8 vs 37.5 | .406 vs .426 |

2010s

| Season | Individual | | | Team vs Opponents | | |
| Season | PPG | RPG | APG | PPG | RPG | FG% |
|---|---|---|---|---|---|---|
| 2010 | T. Charles (15.5) | T. Charles (11.7) | R. Montgomery (4.1) | 81.0 vs 79.9 | 36.5 vs 35.6 | .427 vs .433 |
| 2011 | T. Charles (17.6) | T. Charles (11.0) | R. Montgomery (4.9) | 80.1 vs 76.8 | 35.6 vs 36.5 | .424 vs .429 |
| 2012 | T. Charles (18.0) | T. Charles (10.5) | K. Lawson (4.0) | 81.6 vs 77.4 | 34.4 vs 35.3 | .431 vs .430 |
| 2013 | T. Charles (18.0) | T. Charles (10.1) | K. Lawson (4.2) | 71.0 vs 76.9 | 33.9 vs 37.6 | .400 vs .436 |
| 2014 | C. Ogwumike (15.5) | C. Ogwumike (8.5) | A. Bentley (3.7) | 75.7 vs 77.5 | 33.9 vs 33.6 | .415 vs .443 |
| 2015 | K. Bone (15.4) | K. Bone (6.3) | J. Thomas (3.9) | 75.0 vs 76.6 | 31.0 vs 33.6 | .422 vs .440 |
| 2016 | A. Bentley (12.9) | C. Ogwumike (6.7) | J. Thomas (5.1) | 83.0 vs 84.4 | 34.1 vs 33.9 | .439 vs .459 |
| 2017 | J. Jones (15.4) | J. Jones (11.9) | A. Thomas (4.5) | 86.0 vs 81.6 | 36.7 vs 33.8 | .448 vs .435 |
| 2018 | C. Ogwumike (14.4) | A. Thomas (8.1) | J. Thomas (4.8) | 87.6 vs 81.7 | 36.9 vs 32.0 | .466 vs .443 |
| 2019 | J. Jones (14.6) | J. Jones (9.7) | J. Thomas (5.1) | 80.8 vs 77.9 | 36.8 vs 33.3 | .423 vs .439 |

2020s

| Season | Individual | | | Team vs Opponents | | |
| Season | PPG | RPG | APG | PPG | RPG | FG% |
|---|---|---|---|---|---|---|
| 2020 | D. Bonner (19.7) | A. Thomas (9.0) | A. Thomas (4.8) | 80.4 vs 79.9 | 35.5 vs 33.0 | .427 vs .443 |
| 2021 | J. Jones (19.4) | J. Jones (11.2) | J. Thomas (4.0) | 79.7 vs 69.9 | 36.6 vs 27.3 | .444 vs .409 |
| 2022 | J. Jones (14.6) | J. Jones (8.6) | A. Thomas (6.1) | 85.8 vs 77.8 | 37.1 vs 29.0 | .462 vs .439 |
| 2023 | D. Bonner (17.4) | A. Thomas (9.9) | A. Thomas (7.9) | 82.7 vs 79.9 | 33.6 vs 33.9 | .445 vs .435 |
| 2024 | D. Bonner (15.0) | A. Thomas (8.4) | A. Thomas (7.9) | 80.1 vs 73.6 | 33.5 vs 31.7 | .444 vs .431 |
| 2025 | T. Charles (16.3) | A. Morrow (6.9) | M. Mabrey (4.0) | 75.8 vs 86.0 | 31.9 vs 35.3 | .412 vs .466 |

== Media coverage ==
The Sun television rights were held by NBC Sports Boston. Select games aired instead on sister station NECN.

Until 2023, Sun games aired on NESN. Previously, Connecticut Sun games also aired on WCTX (MyTV 9), a local television station for the state of Connecticut. It was the second time WCTX had aired Sun matches. They were also the original home of Sun matches prior to the 2010 season. More often than not, NBA TV picked up the feed from the local broadcast, which were shown nationally. Broadcasters for the Sun games on WCTX consisted of Bob Heussler and Rebecca Lobo, Jennifer Rizzotti or Kara Wolters. From 2012 to 2014 Sun games were broadcast on CPTV Sports (CPTV-S). For the 2011 season, Sun games were broadcast on Comcast Sports Net New England, with Mike Gorman as an announcer. In addition to Mike Gorman, broadcasters in the past have included Leah Secondo and Kara Wolters.

Audio broadcasts for all home games were done by Bob Heussler, which (excluding blackout games, in which case were available on ESPN3.com) were streamed to the WNBA League Pass game feeds on the league website. Furthermore, some Sun games were broadcast nationally on CBS (locally via WFSB), CBS Sports Network, Ion Television (locally via WHPX), ESPN, ESPN2 and ABC (locally via WTNH).

== All-time notes ==
=== Regular season attendance ===
- A sellout for a basketball game at TD Waterhouse Centre (Orlando) is 17,248.
- A sellout for a basketball game at Mohegan Sun Arena (Connecticut) is:
  - 9,518 from 2003 to 2010.
  - 9,323 since 2011.

Regular season all-time attendance
Orlando Miracle
| Year | Average | High | Low | Sellouts | Total for year | WNBA game average |
| 1999 | 9,801 (6th) | 15,442 | 7,028 | 0 | 156,818 | 10,207 |
| 2000 | 7,363 (11th) | 9,464 | 5,731 | 0 | 117,810 | 9,074 |
| 2001 | 7,430 (11th) | 11,903 | 5,363 | 0 | 118,874 | 9,105 |
| 2002 | 7,115 (13th) | 13,111 | 4,323 | 0 | 113,837 | 9,228 |
Connecticut Sun
| Year | Average | High | Low | Sellouts | Total for year | WNBA game average |
| 2003 | 6,025 (14th) | 9,518 | 4,038 | 2 | 102,433 | 8,826 |
| 2004 | 6,635 (13th) | 9,518 | 3,846 | 2 | 112,803 | 8,589 |
| 2005 | 7,156 (10th) | 9,518 | 5,596 | 2 | 121,644 | 8,172 |
| 2006 | 7,417 (9th) | 9,518 | 6,019 | 2 | 126,096 | 7,476 |
| 2007 | 7,970 (7th) | 9,518 | 6,154 | 1 | 135,490 | 7,819 |
| 2008 | 7,644 (11th) | 9,518 | 5,245 | 3 | 129,951 | 7,948 |
| 2009 | 6,794 (12th) | 9,047 | 5,675 | 0 | 115,496 | 8,029 |
| 2010 | 7,486 (9th) | 9,518 | 6,292 | 1 | 127,331 | 7,834 |
| 2011 | 7,056 (9th) | 9,323 | 6,096 | 1 | 119,951 | 7,954 |
| 2012 | 7,266 (8th) | 9,201 | 5,811 | 0 | 123,519 | 7,452 |
| 2013 | 6,548 (10th) | 9,110 | 4,971 | 0 | 111,320 | 7,531 |
| 2014 | 5,980 (10th) | 8,019 | 4,356 | 0 | 101,662 | 7,578 |
| 2015 | 5,557 (10th) | 8,049 | 4,490 | 0 | 94,467 | 7,184 |
| 2016 | 5,837 (10th) | 8,075 | 4,407 | 0 | 99,236 | 7,655 |
| 2017 | 6,728 (8th) | 8,668 | 4,818 | 0 | 114,370 | 7,716 |
| 2018 | 6,626 (5th) | 8,040 | 5,112 | 0 | 106,015 | 6,721 |
| 2019 | 6,842 (5th) | 8,249 | 4,781 | 0 | 116,300 | 6,535 |
| 2020 | Due to the COVID-19 pandemic, the season was played in Bradenton, Florida without fans. | | | | | |
| 2021 | 2,992 (3rd) | 4,724 | 2,014 | 0 | 44,878 | 2,636 |
| 2022 | 5,712 (5th) | 9,137 | 4,014 | 0 | 102,821 | 5,679 |
| 2023 | 6,244 (8th) | 9,168 | 4,316 | 0 | 124,882 | 6,615 |
| 2024 | 8,451 (9th) | 19,125 (Note: The Sun played one 2024 home game at TD Garden in Boston, MA.) | 5,346 | 9 | 169,012 | 9,807 |
| 2025 | 8,653 (10th) | 19,156 (Note: The Sun played one 2025 home game at TD Garden in Boston, MA.) | 6,848 | 1 | 190,369 | 10,986 |
| 2026 | 8,653 (10th) | 19,156 (Note: The Sun played one 2026 home game at TD Garden in Boston, MA.) | 6,848 | 1 | 190,369 | 10,986 |

=== Draft picks ===
- 1999 Expansion Draft: Andrea Congreaves (2), Kisha Ford (4), Yolanda Moore (6), Adrienne Johnson (8)
- 1999: Tari Phillips (8), Sheri Sam (20), Taj McWilliams-Franklin (32), Carla McGhee (44), Elaine Powell (50)
- 2000: Cintia dos Santos (4), Jannon Roland (20), Shawnetta Stewart (36), Romana Hamzová (52)
- 2001: Katie Douglas (10), Brooke Wyckoff (26), Jaclyn Johnson (42), Anne Thorius (58)
- 2002: Davalyn Cunningham (23), Saundra Jackson (39), Tomeka Brown (55)
- 2003 Miami/Portland Dispersal Draft: Debbie Black (6)
- 2003: Courtney Coleman (13), Lindsey Wilson (34)
- 2004 Cleveland Dispersal Draft: selection traded
- 2004: Lindsay Whalen (4), Jessica Brungo (16), Ugo Oha (24), Candace Futrell (29)
- 2005: Katie Feenstra (8), Erin Phillips (21), Megan Mahoney (34)
- 2006: Debbie Merrill (28), Marita Payne (42)
- 2007 Charlotte Dispersal Draft: selection waived
- 2007: Kamesha Hairston (12), Sandrine Gruda (13), Cori Chambers (26), Kiera Hardy (39)
- 2008: Amber Holt (9), Ketia Swanier (12), Jolene Anderson (23), Lauren Ervin (37)
- 2009 Houston Dispersal Draft: selection waived
- 2009: Chante Black (10), Lyndra Littles (17), Alba Torrens (36)
- 2010 Sacramento Dispersal Draft: DeMya Walker (3)
- 2010: Tina Charles (1), Danielle McCray (7), Allison Hightower (15), Johannah Leedham (27)
- 2011: Sydney Colson (16), Adrienne Johnson (28)
- 2012: Astan Dabo (9), Chay Shegog (21)
- 2013: Kelly Faris (11), Anna Prins (23), Andrea Smith (35)
- 2014: Chiney Ogwumike (1), Chelsea Gray (11), DeNesha Stallworth (25)
- 2015: Elizabeth Williams (4), Brittany Hrynko (19)
- 2016: Morgan Tuck (3), Rachel Banham (4), Jamie Weisner (17), Aliyyah Handford (27)
- 2017: Brionna Jones (8), Shayla Cooper (13), Leticia Romero (16), Jessica January (28)
- 2018: Lexie Brown (9), Mikayla Cowling (33)
- 2019: Kristine Anigwe (9), Bridget Carleton (21), Regan Magarity (33)
- 2020: Kaila Charles (23), Juicy Landrum(35)
- 2021: DiJonai Carrington (20), Micaela Kelly (21), Aleah Goodman (30)
- 2022: Nia Clouden (12), Jordan Lewis (24), Kiara Smith (36)
- 2023: Alexis Morris (22), Ashten Prechtel (34)
- 2024: Leïla Lacan (10), Taiyanna Jackson (19), Helena Pueyo (22), Abbey Hsu (34)
- 2025: Aneesah Morrow (7), Saniya Rivers (8), Rayah Marshall (25)
- 2026: Nell Angloma (33), Gianna Kneepkens (5), Charlisse Leger-Walker, (4)

== Franchise records and player accolades ==
=== Franchise leaders ===
- Games played: Nykesha Sales (278)
- Consecutive games played: Nykesha Sales (248, 6/10/99-7/6/06)
- Minutes: Nykesha Sales (8,762)
- Minutes per game: Shannon Johnson (34.0)
- Points: Nykesha Sales (3,955)
- Points per game: Tina Charles (18.0)
- Consecutive games scoring: Taj McWilliams-Franklin (243, 6/10/99-8/13/06)
- Field goal % (minimum 100): Margo Dydek (462–1,032, .503)
- Three point % (minimum 50): Kara Lawson (140–345, .409)
- Free throw % (minimum 100): Kara Lawson (164–182, .900)
- Rebounds: Taj McWilliams-Franklin (1,814)
- Rebounds per game: Tina Charles (11.7)
- Assists: Lindsay Whalen (808)
- Assists per game: Lindsay Whalen (5.0)
- Steals: Nykesha Sales (490)
- Steals per game: Nykesha Sales (1.76)
- Blocks: Taj McWilliams-Franklin (267)
- Blocks per game: Margo Dydek (2.26)
- Personal fouls: Nykesha Sales (798)
- Turnovers: Nykesha Sales (578)

=== Individual honors ===
WNBA Most Valuable Player

- Tina Charles – 2012
- Jonquel Jones – 2021

All–WNBA First Team

- Katie Douglas – 2006
- Lindsay Whalen – 2008
- Tina Charles – 2011, 2012
- Jonquel Jones – 2021
- Alyssa Thomas – 2023, 2024

All–WNBA Second Team

- Shannon Johnson – 1999, 2000, 2002
- Nykesha Sales – 2004
- Taj McWilliams-Franklin – 2005, 2006
- Katie Douglas – 2007
- Asjha Jones – 2008
- Tina Charles – 2010, 2013
- Jonquel Jones – 2017, 2019, 2022
- DeWanna Bonner – 2020
- Alyssa Thomas – 2022

WNBA All–Star Game MVP

- Katie Douglas – 2006

WNBA Most Improved Player

- Wendy Palmer – 2004
- Kelsey Bone – 2015
- Jonquel Jones – 2017
- Brionna Jones – 2021
- DiJonai Carrington – 2024

WNBA Sixth Woman of the Year

- Renee Montgomery – 2012
- Jonquel Jones – 2018
- Brionna Jones – 2022

WNBA Coach of the Year

- Mike Thibault – 2006, 2008
- Curt Miller – 2017, 2021
- Stephanie White – 2023

WNBA Basketball Executive of the Year

- Curt Miller – 2017

WNBA All–Defensive First Team

- Katie Douglas – 2005, 2006, 2007
- Jasmine Thomas – 2017, 2018, 2019
- Jonquel Jones – 2019, 2021
- Alyssa Thomas – 2020, 2023, 2024
- Briann January – 2021
- DiJonai Carrington – 2024

WNBA All–Defensive Second Team

- Taj McWilliams-Franklin – 2005
- Margo Dydek – 2006, 2007
- Tina Charles – 2011, 2012
- Jasmine Thomas – 2016, 2021
- Alyssa Thomas – 2017, 2019, 2022
- Brionna Jones – 2021
- Jonquel Jones – 2022

WNBA Rookie of the Year

- Tina Charles – 2010
- Chiney Ogwumike – 2014

WNBA All–Rookie Team

- Amber Holt – 2008
- Tina Charles – 2010
- Kelsey Griffin – 2010
- Chiney Ogwumike – 2014
- Alyssa Thomas – 2014

Kim Perrot Sportsmanship

- Taj McWilliams-Franklin – 2005
- Kara Lawson – 2012

WNBA Peak Performers

- Lindsay Whalen (Assists) – 2008
- Tina Charles (Rebounds) – 2010, 2011, 2012
- Jonquel Jones – 2017
- Alyssa Thomas (Rebounds) – 2023

=== All–Stars ===
- 1999: Shannon Johnson, Taj McWilliams-Franklin, Nykesha Sales
- 2000: Shannon Johnson, Taj McWilliams-Franklin, Nykesha Sales
- 2001: Taj McWilliams-Franklin, Nykesha Sales
- 2002: Shannon Johnson, Nykesha Sales
- 2003: Shannon Johnson, Nykesha Sales
- 2004: Taj McWilliams-Franklin, Nykesha Sales, Lindsay Whalen
- 2005: Taj McWilliams-Franklin, Nykesha Sales
- 2006: Katie Douglas, Margo Dydek, Taj McWilliams-Franklin, Nykesha Sales, Lindsay Whalen
- 2007: Katie Douglas, Asjha Jones
- 2008: No All-Star Game
- 2009: Asjha Jones
- 2010: Tina Charles, Renee Montgomery
- 2011: Tina Charles, Renee Montgomery
- 2012: No All-Star Game
- 2013: Tina Charles, Allison Hightower
- 2014: Katie Douglas, Chiney Ogwumike
- 2015: Alex Bentley, Kelsey Bone
- 2016: No All-Star Game
- 2017: Jasmine Thomas, Jonquel Jones, Alyssa Thomas
- 2018: Chiney Ogwumike
- 2019: Jonquel Jones, Alyssa Thomas
- 2020: No All-Star Game
- 2021: DeWanna Bonner, Brionna Jones, Jonquel Jones
- 2022: Brionna Jones, Jonquel Jones, Alyssa Thomas
- 2023: Alyssa Thomas, DeWanna Bonner
- 2024: DeWanna Bonner, Brionna Jones, Alyssa Thomas

=== Olympians ===
- 2008: Erin Phillips (AUS)
- 2012: Tina Charles (USA)
- 2016: Asjha Jones (USA)
- 2024: Alyssa Thomas (USA)

Sporting positions
| Preceded by Detroit Shock | WNBA Eastern Conference Champions; 2004 (First title); 2005 (Second title) | Succeeded by Detroit Shock |
