= WNPR =

Connecticut public radio station

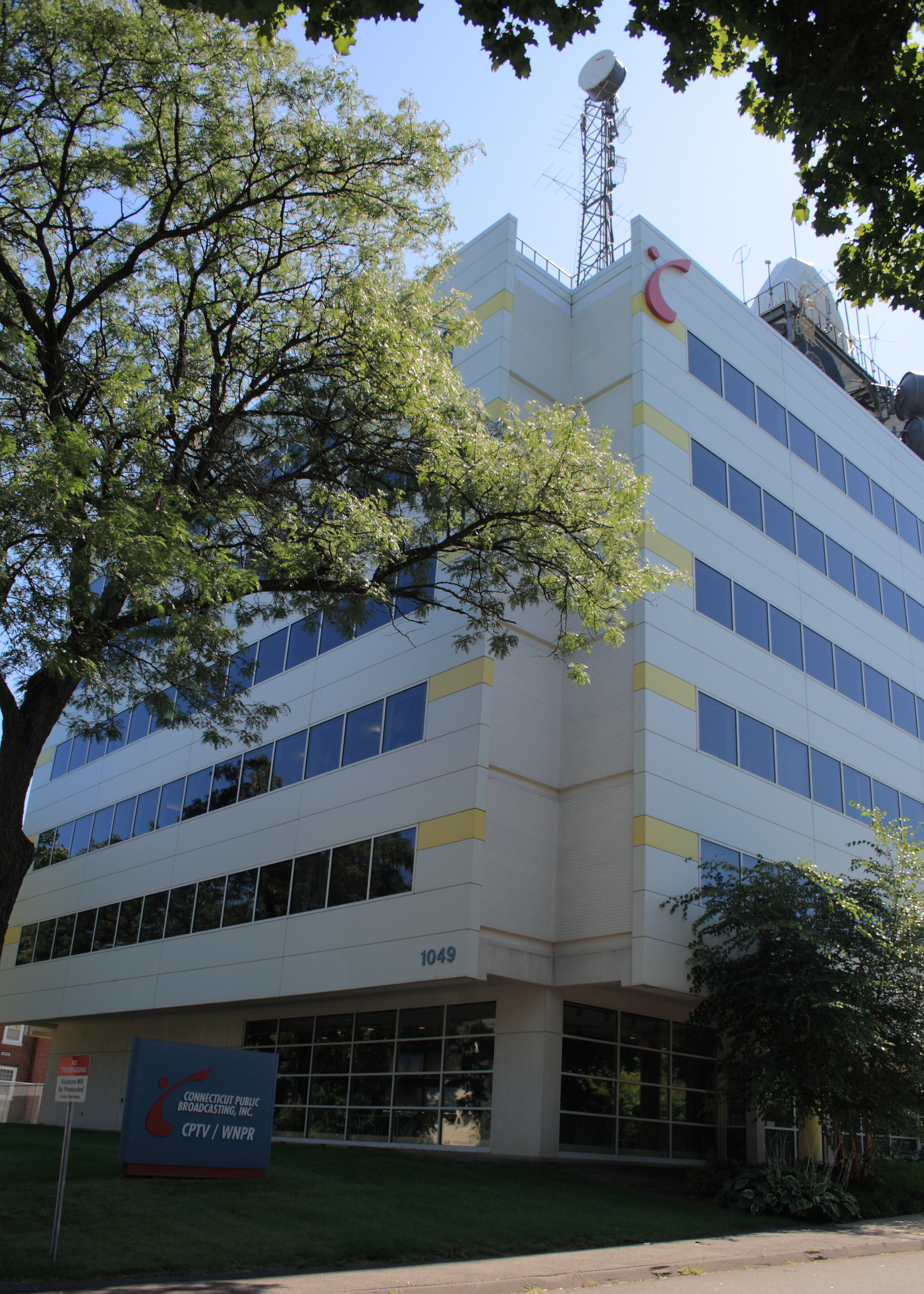
- The headquarters of WNPR and CPTV in Hartford, Connecticut
- Meriden, Connecticut; United States
- Broadcast area: Connecticut; Western Massachusetts; Eastern Long Island
- Frequency: 90.5 MHz (HD Radio)
- Branding: Connecticut Public Radio

Programming
- Language: English
- Format: Public radio; news/talk
- Affiliations: APM; NPR; PRX

Ownership
- Owner: Connecticut Public Broadcasting
- Sister stations: Connecticut Public Television

History
- First air date: June 12, 1978
- Former call signs: WPBH (1978–1984); WPKT (1984–2011)
- Call sign meaning: "Norwich Public Radio"

Technical information
- Licensing authority: FCC
- Facility ID: 13627
- Class: B
- ERP: 18,500 watts
- HAAT: 251 meters (823 ft)
- Transmitter coordinates: 41°33′42.3″N 72°50′39.3″W
- Translator: See § Translators
- Repeater: See § Repeaters

Links
- Public license information: Public file; LMS
- Webcast: Listen live
- Website: www.ctpublic.org

Connecticut Public Radio, commonly known as WNPR, is a network of public radio stations in the state of Connecticut, western Massachusetts, and eastern Long Island, affiliated with National Public Radio (NPR). It is owned by Connecticut Public Broadcasting Network, which also owns Connecticut Public Television (CPTV).

The radio network airs primarily news and talk from NPR along with several locally produced programs. It is headquartered with CPTV in Hartford, and operates an additional studio in New Haven.

== History ==
In the early 1970s, WTIC in Hartford dropped its longtime classical music format in favor of adult contemporary music, and sold its library to CPTV. Looking for a way to put the library to use, CPTV decided to get into radio. At the time, while Hartford got a fairly decent signal from WFCR in Amherst, Massachusetts, and much of southwestern Connecticut was covered by WNYC in New York City, most of the rest of the state did not even get a grade B signal from an NPR station. New Haven, for instance, had to content itself with a translator of WFCR on 90.5 FM. Finding available frequencies proved difficult, however. In addition to the crowded state of the noncommercial end of the FM dial in the Northeast, there was a considerable glut of 10-watt stations in the state. Ultimately, CPTV bought the 90.5 frequency from the Friends of WFCR, the New Haven group that owned the WFCR translator, and used it as the linchpin for what would become Connecticut Public Radio.

The network's first station, WPBH, signed on in June 12, 1978. The station was licensed to Meriden, halfway between Hartford and New Haven, to serve both cities (Hartford and New Haven, then as now, are separate radio markets). CPBI originally wanted the WNPR calls, but the FCC turned it down due to objections from WPLR in New Haven, which claimed the calls sounded too similar. It became WPKT in 1984 after board chairman Homer D. Babbidge Jr. requested the FCC change the call letters to honor CPBN head Paul K. Taff.

WNPR (89.1 FM) in Norwich followed in 1981, WEDW-FM (88.5 FM) in Stamford in 1985 and WRLI-FM (91.3 FM) on Long Island in 1993.

On September 15, 2011, WPKT and WNPR swapped call signs. Although 90.5 FM has always been the flagship station, the network had been using WNPR as its on-air name since the 1990s.

For the first 20 years of its existence, the network broadcast a mix of classical music, jazz and NPR talk. However, starting in the late 1990s, WNPR began gradually increasing the news programming on its schedule. One of the first casualties of this change was the popular classical music program Morning pro musica, which was fed from WGBH-FM in Boston. The program had aired on WNPR as part of the terms by which the Friends of WFCR sold the 90.5 frequency to CPBI. However, by the late 1990s, this resulted in WNPR only being able to run the first hour of Morning Edition. Ultimately, WNPR decided to cancel Morning pro musica, even though network executives knew it would cause a major loss in funding. However, the increased willingness of NPR member stations to focus on news, especially after the September 11 attacks occurred, made the format change palatable. Ultimately, in 2006, WNPR dropped classical music altogether in favor of a full-time news and information format. In 2013, the station launched a new online service, WNPR News.

=== WAIC ===
From 2011 to 2016, Connecticut Public Radio operated WAIC (91.9 FM), the college radio station of American International College in Springfield, Massachusetts. WAIC first went on air in February 1967, going stereo in 1985. Initially programmed from American International College (at various points programming top 40 and adult hits), it became a full-time relay of Connecticut Public Radio on November 1, 2011. This ended in 2016, when WNPR turned over operation of WAIC to WFCR, the NPR member for Western Massachusetts. WFCR made WAIC a satellite of its all-news network.

== Programming ==
Connecticut Public Radio features the programs Where We Live, The Colin McEnroe Show, Audacious with Chion Wolf, Seasoned, and Disrupted with Khaliah Brown-Dean, all based in Hartford. The station also syndicates NPR programming. Connecticut Public Radio also produces the regional news show Next with the New England News Collaborative.

From 1982 to 2019, Faith Middleton hosted various shows out of the New Haven studio. She hosted The Faith Middleton Show and The Faith Middleton Food Schmooze, until she retired in 2019.

In 2021, The Wheelhouse, a Wednesday weekly political round table talk show was absorbed into Where We Live's schedule on Wednesday mornings, and still with a focus on local and national politics. The Wheelhouse returned in the same time slot in 2023.

In the aftermath of Hurricane Maria which hit Puerto Rico in September 2017, WNPR produced a documentary entitled "The Island Next Door", focused on the impact of the storm on the island and the links between New England and Puerto Rico. The documentary was released in late 2018 to coincide with the one year mark since the storm ravaged Puerto Rico.

== Awards ==
WNPR has received many awards over the past few decades. It has received two George Foster Peabody Awards, five Ohio State Awards and two Gracie Allen Awards. It has also gotten over 60 Associated Press Awards, which include eight Mark Twain Awards for Overall Station Excellence.

Faith Middleton has been voted Best Radio Talk-Show Host by Connecticut Magazine readers for the past 10 years.

== Other stations ==
=== Repeaters ===
Call sign	Frequency	City of license	FID	ERP (W)	HAAT	Class	Transmitter coordinates	Call sign meaning
WPKT	89.1 FM	Norwich, Connecticut	13618	5,100	180 meters (590 ft)	B1	41°31′11.3″N 72°10′2.2″W	Paul K. Taff
WEDW-FM	88.5 FM	Stamford, Connecticut	13619	2,000	92 meters (302 ft)	A	41°2′49.3″N 73°31′34.4″W	Educational Western Connecticut (shared with CPTV's station in the area)
WRLI-FM	91.3 FM	Southampton, New York	13598	10,000	95 meters (312 ft)	B1	40°56′5.3″N 72°23′13.3″W	Radio Long Island
WDAQ-HD4	98.3-4 FM	Danbury, Connecticut	4822	1,300	140 meters (460 ft)	A	41.374°N 73.446°W	Leased HD Radio channel on WDAQ-FM "98Q"

=== Translators ===
Broadcast translators for WNPR
Call sign	Frequency	City of license	FID	HAAT	Class	Transmitter coordinates	FCC info
W258AC	99.5 FM	Storrs, Connecticut	13611	117 m (384 ft)	D	41°48′50.4″N 72°15′34.3″W	LMS
W249CW	97.7 FM	Torrington, Connecticut	147304	0 m (0 ft)	D	41°50′26.3″N 73°9′44.4″W	LMS
W206BW	89.1 FM	Westville, Connecticut	123260	0 m (0 ft)	D	41°20′58.8″N 72°58′20.7″W	LMS

Broadcast translator for WDAQ-HD4
Call sign	Frequency	City of license	FID	HAAT	Class	Transmitter coordinates	FCC info
W279CI	103.7 FM	Danbury, Connecticut	153813	0 m (0 ft)	D	41°22′27.3″N 72°26′45.4″W	LMS

=== Additional affiliates ===
- WECS (90.1 FM) Windham: Eastern Connecticut State University's campus station simulcasts the network's feeds of Morning Edition, All Things Considered and Car Talk.
- WVOF (88.5 FM) Fairfield: Fairfield University's campus station simulcasts the network's feeds of Morning Edition, All Things Considered, Where We Live, Car Talk, Wait, Wait Don't Tell Me, Living on Earth, Speaking of Faith, Studio 360. and the BBC World Service.
