= Connecticut Public Broadcasting =

- Headquarters in Hartford, CT
- Formation: Tax-exempt since March 1964; 62 years ago
- Type: 501(c)(3)
- Tax ID no.: EIN: 60758938
- Headquarters: Hartford
- Net Assets: 59,686,466 USD (2024)
- Revenue: 25,072,929 USD (2024)
- Expenses: 27,858,736 USD (2024)
- Website: www.cpbn.org

Connecticut Public Broadcasting, Inc. (CPBI), doing business as Connecticut Public or Connecticut Public Broadcasting Network (CPBN) is the parent organization of Connecticut Public Television (CPTV) and Connecticut Public Radio (WNPR). It is a 501(c)(3) nonprofit organization.

== History ==
The organization was founded in 1962 as Connecticut Educational Television Corporation. Connecticut Public Radio merged in to form Connecticut Public Broadcasting around 1978.

== Locations ==
The studios and facilities of Connecticut Public Broadcasting are primarily located in Hartford, with a secondary radio studio in New Haven. It has over-the-air television and FM radio transmitters around Connecticut (and one on eastern Long Island, New York), covering most of Connecticut and some neighboring areas.
