= 2014 Connecticut House of Representatives election =

- November 4, 2014

All 151 seats in the Connecticut House of Representatives 76 seats needed for a majority
	Majority party	Minority party
Leader	Brendan Sharkey	Lawrence F. Cafero (Retired)
Party	Democratic	Republican
Leader's seat	88th District	142nd District
Last election	99	52
Seats before	97	54
Seats won	87	64
Seat change	▼10	▲10
Popular vote	479,966	475,976
Percentage	47.83%	47.43%
Swing	▼6.65%	▲5.01%
- Results by district Democratic gain Republican gain Democratic hold Republican hold
Speaker before election
Brendan Sharkey
Democratic
Elected Speaker
Brendan Sharkey
Democratic

The 2014 Connecticut House of Representatives election was held on Tuesday, November 4, 2014, to elect members to the Connecticut House of Representatives, one from each of the state's 151 General Assembly districts. The date of this the election corresponded with other elections in the state, including races for governor, U.S. House, and the State Senate.

Democrats retained their control of the House of Representatives, but lost 10 seats, lowering their total seat count to 87. Republicans picked up 10 seats, expanding their seat total to 64.

== Retirements ==
18 incumbents did not seek re-election in 2014.

=== Democrats ===
1. District 11: Tim Larson retired to run for State Senate.
2. District 12: Geoff Luxenberg retired.
3. District 27: Sandy Nafis retired.
4. District 38: Elizabeth Ritter retired to run for State Senate.
5. District 44: Mae Flexer retired to run for State Senate.
6. District 45: Steve Mikutel retired.
7. District 98: Patricia Widlitz retired to run for State Senate.
8. District 124: Charles Clemons Sr. retired.
9. District 133: Kim Fawcett retired to run for State Senate.
10. District 146: Gerald Fox III retired to run for Stamford probate judge.

=== Republicans ===
1. District 23: Marilyn Giuliano retired.
2. District 52: Penny Bacchiochi retired to run for lieutenant governor.
3. District 55: Pamela Sawyer retired.
4. District 68: Sean Williams retired.
5. District 112: DebraLee Hovey retired.
6. District 134: Tony Hwang retired to run for State Senate.
7. District 142: Lawrence F. Cafero retired.
8. District 150: Stephen Walko retired.

== Incumbents defeated ==
One incumbent, a Democrat, was defeated in the August 12th primary election, while nine incumbents, eight Democrats and one Republican, were defeated in November.

=== In primary election ===
==== Democrats ====
1. District 39: Christina Ayala lost re-nomination to Christopher Rosario, following a voter fraud investigation.

=== In general election ===
==== Democrats ====
1. District 13: Joe Diminico lost re-election to Mark Tweedie.
2. District 35: Tom Vicino lost re-election to Jesse MacLachlan.
3. District 40: Edward Moukawsher lost re-election to John F. Scott.
4. District 41: Elissa Wright lost re-election to Aundre Bumgardner.
5. District 42: Timothy Russell Bowles lost re-election to Mike France.
6. District 47: Brian Sear lost re-election to Doug Dubitsky.
7. District 77: Christopher Wright lost re-election to Cara Christine Pavalock.
8. District 117: Paul Davis lost re-election to Charles Ferraro.
9. District 119: James Maroney lost re-election to Pam Staneski.

==== Republicans ====
1. District 144: Michael Molgano lost re-election to Caroline Simmons.

== Predictions ==
Source	Ranking	As of
Governing	Safe D	October 30, 2014

== Special elections ==
=== District 53 (Special) ===
Representative Bryan Hurlburt resigned from office to take an appointment to the United States Department of AgricultureFarm Service Agency by President Barack Obama.

June 11, 2013 Connecticut's 53rd State House district special election
Party	Candidate	Votes	%
Republican	Sam Belsito	1,910	58.48%
Democratic	Anthony J. Horn	1,356	41.52%
Total votes		3,266	100.00%
Republican gain from Democratic			

=== District 61 (Special) ===
Representative Elaine O'Brien died from glioblastoma while in office.

April 11, 2014 Connecticut's 61st State House district special election
Party	Candidate	Votes	%
Republican	Tami Zawistowski	1,975	58.04%
Democratic	Pete Hill	1,428	41.96%
Total votes		3,403	100.00%
Republican gain from Democratic			

=== District 94 (Special) ===
Representative Gary Holder-Winfield resigned from office following his election to the Connecticut State Senate through a February 25, 2014, special election.

April 24, 2014 Connecticut's 94th State House district special election
Party	Candidate	Votes	%
Democratic	Robyn Porter	348	38.1%
Democratic	Berita Rowe-Lewis	239	26.2%
Democratic	Charles Ashe	202	22.1%
Democratic	Len Caplan	81	8.9%
Republican	Reynaud Harp	43	4.7%
Total votes		913	100.00%
Democratic hold			

=== District 122 (Special) ===
Representative Lawrence G. Miller died from brain cancer while in office.

July 22, 2014 Connecticut's 61st State House district special election
Party	Candidate	Votes	%
Republican	Ben McGorty	1,403	75.3%
Democratic	Arlene Liscinsky	459	24.7%
Total votes		1,862	100.00%
Republican hold			

== Results ==
↓
87	64
Democratic	Republican

Parties	Candidates	Seats				Popular vote		
Parties	Candidates	2012	2014	+/-	Strength	Vote	%	Change
Democratic	133	99	87	▼12	57.62%	479,996	47.83%	▼6.65%
Republican	125	52	64	▲12	42.38%	475,976	47.43%	▲5.01%
Independent Party	65 (Note: 60 of the candidates were cross-endorsed with another party, 5 candidates were solely nominated by the Independent Party of Connecticut)	0	0	Steady	0.00%	21,882	2.18%	▲1.01%
Working Families	57 (Note: All 57 candidates appearing on the Working Families Party line were cross-endorsed with another party)	0	0	Steady	0.00%	17,820	1.78%	▲0.01%
Green	9	0	0	Steady	0.00%	3,916	0.39%	▲0.29%
Unaffiliated/Write-ins	12	0	0	Steady	0.00%	1,635	0.16%	▲0.11%
Bottom Line Party	1	0	0	Steady	0.00%	1,226	0.12%	▼ %
Libertarian	1	0	0	Steady	0.00%	830	0.08%	New
Peace and Progress Party	2	0	0	Steady	0.00%	269	0.03%	New
Total	288 (Note: 285 individual candidates ran across 405 ballot lines)	151	151		100.00%	1,003,520	100.00%	100.00%

House seats
Democratic	57.62%
Republican	42.38%

Popular vote
Republican	47.83%
Democratic	47.43%
Independent Party	2.18%
Working Families	1.78%

== Election results ==
=== District 1 ===
2014 Connecticut State House of Representatives election, District 1
Party	Candidate	Votes	%
Democratic	Matthew Ritter (Incumbent)	3,566	91.6%
Republican	Ken Lerman	328	8.4%
Total votes		3,894	100.00%
Democratic hold			

=== District 2 ===
2018 Connecticut State House of Representatives election, District 2
Party	Candidate	Votes	%
Republican	Dan E. Carter	4,110	53.3%
Independent Party	Dan E. Carter	44	4.0%
Total	Dan E. Carter (Incumbent)	4,154	57.3%
Democratic	Candace Fay	3,287	42.7%
Total votes		7,441	100.00%
Republican hold			

=== District 3 ===
2014 Connecticut State House of Representatives election, District 3
Party	Candidate	Votes	%
Democratic	Minnie Gonzalez (Incumbent)	2,171	85.9%
Republican	Sweets Wilson	230	9.1%
Unaffiliated	Victor M. Luna Jr.	126	5.0%
Total votes		2,527	100.00%
Democratic hold			

=== District 4 ===
2014 Connecticut State House of Representatives election, District 4
Party	Candidate	Votes	%
Democratic	Angel Arce (Incumbent)	1,953	100%
Total votes		1,953	100.00%
Democratic hold			

=== District 5 ===
2014 Connecticut State House of Representatives election, District 5
Party	Candidate	Votes	%
Democratic	Brandon McGee (Incumbent)	5,332	100%
Total votes		5,332	100.00%
Democratic hold			

=== District 6 ===
2014 Connecticut State House of Representatives election, District 6
Party	Candidate	Votes	%
Democratic	Edwin Vargas	2,506	76.38%
Working Families	Edwin Vargas	324	9.88%
Total	Edwin Vargas (Incumbent)	2,830	86.26%
Republican	Russell Williams	451	13.74%
Total votes		3,281	100.00%
Democratic hold			

=== District 7 ===
2014 Connecticut State House of Representatives election, District 7
Party	Candidate	Votes	%
Democratic	Douglas McCrory (Incumbent)	3,593	97.0%
Unaffiliated	Donna Thompson-Daniel	113	3.0%
Total votes		3,706	100.00%
Democratic hold			

=== District 8 ===
2014 Connecticut State House of Representatives election, District 8
Party	Candidate	Votes	%
Republican	Tim Ackert (Incumbent)	6,462	65.9%
Democratic	Anthony Ortiz	3,044	31.1%
Working Families	Anthony Ortiz	298	3.0%
Total	Anthony Ortiz	3,342	34.1%
Total votes		9,804	100.00%
Republican hold			

=== District 9 ===
2014 Connecticut State House of Representatives election, District 9
Party	Candidate	Votes	%
Democratic	Jason Rojas (Incumbent)	5,054	85.9%
Libertarian	Richard Lion	830	14.1%
Total votes		5,884	100.00%
Democratic hold			

=== District 10 ===
2014 Connecticut State House of Representatives election, District 10
Party	Candidate	Votes	%
Democratic	Henry Genga	3,933	89.3%
Working Families	Henry Genga	470	10.7%
Total	Henry Genga (Incumbent)	4,403	100%
Total votes		4,403	100.00%
Democratic hold			

=== District 11 ===
2014 Connecticut State House of Representatives election, District 11
Party	Candidate	Votes	%
Democratic	Jeffrey Currey	2,682	65.7%
Republican	Jack Jacobs	1,400	34.3%
Total votes		4,082	100.00%
Democratic hold			

=== District 12 ===
2014 Connecticut State House of Representatives election, District 12
Party	Candidate	Votes	%
Democratic	Kelly Juleson-Scopino	3,848	56.6%
Working Families	Kelly Juleson-Scopino	338	5.0%
Total	Kelly Juleson-Scopino	4,186	61.6%
Republican	Rusty Meek	3,678	38.4%
Total votes		7,854	100.00%
Democratic hold			

=== District 13 ===
2014 Connecticut State House of Representatives election, District 13
Party	Candidate	Votes	%
Republican	Mark Tweedie	4,282	52.5%
Democratic	Joe Diminico (Incumbent)	3,876	47.5%
Total votes		6,158	100.00%
Republican gain from Democratic			

=== District 14 ===
2014 Connecticut State House of Representatives election, District 14
Party	Candidate	Votes	%
Republican	Bill Aman	6,180	60.0%
Independent Party	Bill Aman	347	3.7%
Total	Bill Aman	6,527	69.7%
Democratic	Mary Justine Hockenberry	2,831	30.3%
Total votes		9,358	100.00%
Republican hold			

=== District 15 ===
2014 Connecticut State House of Representatives election, District 15
Party	Candidate	Votes	%
Democratic	David Baram	6,978	77.2%
Working Families	David Baram	281	3.1%
Total	David Baram (Incumbent)	7,259	80.3%
Republican	James McGovern	1,779	19.7%
Total votes		9,038	100.00%
Democratic hold			

=== District 16 ===
2014 Connecticut State House of Representatives election, District 16
Party	Candidate	Votes	%
Democratic	John Hampton (Incumbent)	5,221	50.67%
Republican	Cheryl Cook	4,758	46.17%
Independent Party	Cheryl Cook	247	2.40%
Total	Cheryl Cook	5,005	48.57%
Unaffiliated	Robert Kalechman	80	0.78%
Total votes		10,306	100.00%
Democratic hold			

=== District 17 ===
2014 Connecticut State House of Representatives election, District 17
Party	Candidate	Votes	%
Republican	Timothy LeGeyt (Incumbent)	7,524	100%
Total votes		7,524	100.00%
Republican hold			

=== District 18 ===
2014 Connecticut State House of Representatives election, District 18
Party	Candidate	Votes	%
Democratic	Andy Fleischmann (Incumbent)	6,419	100%
Total votes		6,419	100.00%
Democratic hold			

=== District 19 ===
2014 Connecticut State House of Representatives election, District 19
Party	Candidate	Votes	%
Democratic	Brian Becker (Incumbent)	6,147	57.3%
Republican	Mark Zydanowicz	4,580	42.7%
Total votes		10,727	100.00%
Democratic hold			

=== District 20 ===
2014 Connecticut State House of Representatives election, District 20
Party	Candidate	Votes	%
Democratic	Joseph Verrengia (Incumbent)	5,271	100%
Total votes		5,271	100.00%
Democratic hold			

=== District 21 ===
2014 Connecticut State House of Representatives election, District 21
Party	Candidate	Votes	%
Democratic	Mike Demicco	5,141	53.4%
Working Families	Mike Demicco	317	3.3%
Total	Mike Demicco (Incumbent)	5,458	56.7%
Republican	Patty Stoddard	4,175	43.3%
Total votes		13,194	100.00%
Democratic hold			

=== District 22 ===
2014 Connecticut State House of Representatives election, District 22
Party	Candidate	Votes	%
Democratic	Betty Boukus (Incumbent)	3,878	55.1%
Republican	Katherine Pugliese	2,610	37.1%
Independent Party	Katherine Pugliese	314	4.5%
Total	Katherine Pugliese	2,924	41.6%
Unaffiliated	Richard William Broderick II	237	3.4%
Total votes		7,039	100.00%
Democratic hold			

=== District 23 ===
2014 Connecticut State House of Representatives election, District 23
Party	Candidate	Votes	%
Republican	Devin Carney	5,672	54.8%
Independent Party	Devin Carney	389	3.8%
Total	Devin Carney	6,061	58.6%
Democratic	Mary Stone	4,290	41.4%
Total votes		10,351	100.00%
Republican hold			

=== District 24 ===
2014 Connecticut State House of Representatives election, District 24
Party	Candidate	Votes	%
Democratic	Rick Lopes	2,680	49.5%
Working Families	Rick Lopes	245	4.5%
Total	Rick Lopes (Incumbent)	2,925	54.0%
Republican	Gennaro Bizzarro	2,489	46.0%
Total votes		5,414	100.00%
Democratic hold			

=== District 25 ===
2014 Connecticut State House of Representatives election, District 25
Party	Candidate	Votes	%
Democratic	Bobby Sanchez	2,050	67.3%
Working Families	Bobby Sanchez	148	4.9%
Total	Bobby Sanchez (Incumbent)	2,198	62.1%
Republican	Edward Colon	697	22.9%
Unaffiliated	Alfred Mayo	97	3.2%
Green	Paul Gobell	55	1.8%
Total votes		3,047	100.00%
Democratic hold			

=== District 26 ===
2014 Connecticut State House of Representatives election, District 26
Party	Candidate	Votes	%
Democratic	Peter Tercyak	2,301	55.3%
Working Families	Peter Tercyak	179	4.3%
Total	Peter Tercyak (Incumbent)	2,480	59.6%
Republican	Piotr Ceglarz	1,494	35.9%
Republican	Piotr Ceglarz	187	4.5%
Total	Piotr Ceglarz	1,681	40.4%
Total votes		4,161	100.00%
Democratic hold			

=== District 27 ===
2014 Connecticut State House of Representatives election, District 27
Party	Candidate	Votes	%
Republican	Gary Byron	4,715	53.0%
Democratic	Carol Anest	3,934	44.3%
Working Families	Carol Anest	246	2.8%
Total	Carol Anest	4,180	57.1%
Total votes		8,895	100.00%
Republican gain from Democratic			

=== District 28 ===
2014 Connecticut State House of Representatives election, District 28
Party	Candidate	Votes	%
Democratic	Russell Morin	4,703	49.5%
Working Families	Russell Morin	302	3.2%
Total	Russell A. Morin (Incumbent)	5,005	52.7%
Republican	Mike Hurley	4,356	45.9%
Independent Party	Mike Hurley	139	1.5%
Total	Mike Hurley	4,496	47.4%
Total votes		9,501	100.00%
Democratic hold			

=== District 29 ===
2014 Connecticut State House of Representatives election, District 29
Party	Candidate	Votes	%
Democratic	Tony Guerrera	5,812	89.7%
Working Families	Tony Guerrera	665	10.3%
Total	Tony Guerrera (Incumbent)	6,477	100%
Total votes		6,477	100.00%
Democratic hold			

=== District 30 ===
2014 Connecticut State House of Representatives election, District 30
Party	Candidate	Votes	%
Democratic	Joe Aresimowicz	5,513	84.1%
Working Families	Joe Aresimowicz	1,043	15.9%
Total	Joe Aresimowicz (Incumbent)	6,556	100%
Total votes		6,556	100.00%
Democratic hold			

=== District 31 ===
2014 Connecticut State House of Representatives election, District 31
Party	Candidate	Votes	%
Republican	Prasad Srinivasan	7,333	87.4%
Independent Party	Prasad Srinivasan	1,062	12.7%
Total	Prasad Srinivasan (Incumbent)	8,395	100%
Total votes		8,395	100.00%
Republican hold			

=== District 32 ===
2014 Connecticut State House of Representatives election, District 32
Party	Candidate	Votes	%
Republican	Christie Carpino (Incumbent)	5,496	58.8%
Democratic	Kathleen Richards	3,573	38.2%
Working Families	Kathleen Richards	276	2.9%
Total	Kathleen Richards	3,849	41.1%
Total votes		9,345	100.00%
Republican hold			

=== District 33 ===
2014 Connecticut State House of Representatives election, District 33
Party	Candidate	Votes	%
Democratic	Joseph Serra (Incumbent)	3,966	62.1%
Republican	Linda Szynkowicz	2,418	37.9%
Total votes		6,384	100.00%
Democratic hold			

=== District 34 ===
2014 Connecticut State House of Representatives election, District 34
Party	Candidate	Votes	%
Republican	Melissa Ziobron	5,849	63.4%
Independent Party	Melissa Ziobron	604	6.6%
Total	Melissa Ziobron (Incumbent)	6,453	70.0%
Democratic	Mimi Perrotti	2,772	30.0%
Total votes		9,225	100.00%
Republican hold			

=== District 35 ===
2014 Connecticut State House of Representatives election, District 35
Party	Candidate	Votes	%
Republican	Jesse MacLachlan	4,836	51.3%
Independent Party	Jesse MacLachlan	405	4.3%
Total	Jesse MacLachlan	5,211	55.6%
Democratic	Tom Vicno	3,878	41.1%
Working Families	Tom Vicino	316	3.4%
Total	Tom Vicino (Incumbent)	4,194	44.5%
Total votes		9,405	100.00%
Republican gain from Democratic			

=== District 36 ===
2014 Connecticut State House of Representatives election, District 36
Party	Candidate	Votes	%
Democratic	Philip Miller (Incumbent)	5,522	54.0%
Republican	Robert W. Siegrist III	4,701	46.0%
Total votes		10,223	100.00%
Democratic hold			

=== District 37 ===
2014 Connecticut State House of Representatives election, District 37
Party	Candidate	Votes	%
Democratic	Ed Jutila (Incumbent)	5,826	66.9%
Republican	Elbert Burr	2,881	33.1%
Total votes		8,707	100.00%
Democratic hold			

=== District 38 ===
2014 Connecticut State House of Representatives election, District 38
Party	Candidate	Votes	%
Republican	Kathleen McCarty	3,950	45.4%
Independent Party	Kathleen McCarty	339	3.9%
Total	Kathleen McCarty	4,289	49.3%
Democratic	Marc Balestracci	4,199	48.2%
Green	Billy Gene Collins	221	2.5%
Total votes		12,236	100.00%
Republican gain from Democratic			

=== District 39 ===
2014 Connecticut State House of Representatives election, District 39
Party	Candidate	Votes	%
Democratic	Ernest Hewett (Incumbent)	2,265	67.2%
Republican	Andrew Lockwood	1,107	32.8%
Total votes		3,372	100.00%
Democratic hold			

=== District 40 ===
2014 Connecticut State House of Representatives election, District 40
Party	Candidate	Votes	%
Republican	John F. Scott	2,572	56.6%
Democratic	Edward Moukawsher (Incumbent)	1,969	43.4%
Total votes		4,541	100.00%
Republican gain from Democratic			

=== District 41 ===
2014 Connecticut State House of Representatives election, District 41
Party	Candidate	Votes	%
Republican	Aundre Bumgardner	3,289	45.7%
Independent Party	Aundre Bumgardner	331	4.6%
Total	Aundre Bumgardner	3,620	50.3%
Democratic	Elissa Wright (Incumbent)	3,581	49.7%
Total votes		7,201	100.00%
Republican gain from Democratic			

=== District 42 ===
2014 Connecticut State House of Representatives election, District 42
Party	Candidate	Votes	%
Republican	Mike France	3,585	50.9%
Independent Party	Mike France	328	4.7%
Total	Mike France	3,913	55.6%
Democratic	Timothy Russell Bowles	2,891	41.1%
Working Families	Timothy Russell Bowles	232	3.3%
Total	Timothy Russell Bowles (Incumbent)	3,123	44.4%
Total votes		7,026	100.00%
Republican gain from Democratic			

=== District 43 ===
2014 Connecticut State House of Representatives election, District 43
Party	Candidate	Votes	%
Democratic	Diana Urban (Incumbent)	6,922	100%
Total votes		6,922	100%
Democratic hold			

=== District 44 ===
2014 Connecticut State House of Representatives election, District 44
Party	Candidate	Votes	%
Democratic	Christine Rosati Randall	3,304	51.5%
Republican	Jonathan Cesolini	2,862	48.5%
Total votes		6,166	100.00%
Democratic hold			

=== District 45 ===
2014 Connecticut State House of Representatives election, District 45
Party	Candidate	Votes	%
Democratic	Paul Brycki	3,588	51.5%
Republican	Stuart Norman Jr.	3,382	48.5%
Total votes		6,970	100.00%
Democratic hold			

=== District 46 ===
2014 Connecticut State House of Representatives election, District 46
Party	Candidate	Votes	%
Democratic	Emmett Riley (Incumbent)	2,461	59.8%
Republican	Rob Dempsky	1,403	34.1%
Independent Party	Rob Dempsky	254	6.2%
Total	Rob Dempsky	1,657	40.2%
Total votes		4,118	100.00%
Democratic hold			

=== District 47 ===
2014 Connecticut State House of Representatives election, District 47
Party	Candidate	Votes	%
Republican	Doug Dubitsky	4,389	48.8%
Independent Party	Doug Dubitsky	438	4.9%
Total	Doug Dubitsky	4,827	53.7%
Democratic	Brian Sear	3,791	42.1%
Working Families	Brian Sear	381	4.2%
Total	Brian Sear (Incumbent)	4,172	46.3%
Total votes		8,999	100.00%
Republican gain from Democratic			

=== District 48 ===
2014 Connecticut State House of Representatives election, District 48
Party	Candidate	Votes	%
Democratic	Linda Orange	4,688	53.4%
Working Families	Linda Orange	547	6.2%
Total	Linda Orange (Incumbent)	5,235	59.6%
Republican	Evan Evans	3,544	40.4%
Total votes		8,779	100.00%
Democratic hold			

=== District 49 ===
2014 Connecticut State House of Representatives election, District 49
Party	Candidate	Votes	%
Democratic	Susan Johnson	2,758	62.7%
Working Families	Susan Johnson	417	9.5%
Total	Susan Johnson (Incumbent)	3,175	72.1%
Bottom Line Party	Ernest Eldridge	1,226	27.9%
Total votes		4,401	100.00%
Democratic hold			

=== District 50 ===
2014 Connecticut State House of Representatives election, District 50
Party	Candidate	Votes	%
Republican	Mike Alberts (Incumbent)	5,909	100%
Total votes		5,909	100.00%
Republican hold			

=== District 51 ===
2014 Connecticut State House of Representatives election, District 51
Party	Candidate	Votes	%
Democratic	Daniel Rovero (Incumbent)	4,648	100%
Total votes		4,648	100.00%
Democratic hold			

=== District 52 ===
2014 Connecticut State House of Representatives election, District 52
Party	Candidate	Votes	%
Republican	Kurt Vail	4,292	54.3%
Independent Party	Kurt Vail	240	3.0%
Total	Kurt Vail	4,532	57.3%
Democratic	David Pinney	2,999	37.9%
Unaffiliated	Linda Louise LaCasse	373	4.7%
Total votes		7,904	100.00%
Republican hold			

=== District 53 ===
2014 Connecticut State House of Representatives election, District 53
Party	Candidate	Votes	%
Republican	Sam Belsito	4,647	51.0%
Independent Party	Sam Belsito	384	4.2%
Total	Sam Belsito (Incumbent)	5,031	55.2%
Democratic	Rick Field	4,088	44.8%
Total votes		9,119	100.00%
Republican hold			

=== District 54 ===
2014 Connecticut State House of Representatives election, District 54
Party	Candidate	Votes	%
Democratic	Gregory Haddad	2,945	68.1%
Working Families	Gregory Haddad	247	5.7%
Total	Gregory Haddad (Incumbent)	3,192	73.8%
Republican	Ray Haddad	1,134	26.2%
Total votes		4,326	100.00%
Democratic hold			

=== District 55 ===
2014 Connecticut State House of Representatives election, District 55
Party	Candidate	Votes	%
Republican	Gayle Mulligan	6,181	60.6%
Independent Party	Gayle Mulligan	502	4.9%
Total	Gayle Mulligan	6,683	65.5%
Democratic	Joseph La Bella	3,516	34.5%
Total votes		10,199	100.00%
Republican hold			

=== District 56 ===
2014 Connecticut State House of Representatives election, District 56
Party	Candidate	Votes	%
Democratic	Claire Janowski (Incumbent)	3,730	54.9%
Republican	Jim Tedford	2,815	41.5%
Independent Party	Jim Tedford	244	3.6%
Total	Jim Tedford	3,059	45.1%
Total votes		6,789	100.00%
Democratic hold			

=== District 57 ===
2014 Connecticut State House of Representatives election, District 57
Party	Candidate	Votes	%
Republican	Christopher Davis (Incumbent)	5,358	65.5%
Democratic	Nicole Kidney	2,819	34.5%
Total votes		8,177	100.00%
Republican hold			

=== District 58 ===
2014 Connecticut State House of Representatives election, District 58
Party	Candidate	Votes	%
Democratic	David J. Alexander	3,199	51.5%
Working Families	David J. Alexander	220	3.5%
Total	David J. Alexander (Incumbent)	3,419	55.0%
Republican	Tom Kienzler	2,612	42.0%
Independent Party	Tom Kienzler	187	3.0%
Total	Tom Kienzler	2,799	45.0%
Total votes		6,218	100.00%
Democratic hold			

=== District 59 ===
2014 Connecticut State House of Representatives election, District 59
Party	Candidate	Votes	%
Democratic	David Kiner	3,965	50.0%
Working Families	David Kiner	530	4.0%
Total	David Kiner (Incumbent)	4,495	54.0%
Republican	Rob Kwasnicki	2,922	43.2%
Independent Party	Rob Kwasnicki	193	2.9%
Total	Rob Kwasnicki	3,115	46.0%
Total votes		7,610	100.00%
Democratic hold			

=== District 60 ===
2014 Connecticut State House of Representatives election, District 60
Party	Candidate	Votes	%
Democratic	Peggy Sayers (Incumbent)	4,263	52.1%
Republican	Scott Storms	3,702	45.2%
Independent Party	Scott Storms	223	2.7%
Total	Scott Storms	3,925	47.9%
Total votes		8,188	100.00%
Democratic gain from			

=== District 61 ===
2014 Connecticut State House of Representatives election, District 61
Party	Candidate	Votes	%
Republican	Tami Zawistowski	4,898	58.5%
Independent Party	Tami Zawistowski	272	3.3%
Total	Tami Zawistowski (Incumbent)	5,170	61.8%
Democratic	Joe Doering	3,197	38.2%
Total votes		8,367	100.00%
Republican hold			

=== District 62 ===
2014 Connecticut State House of Representatives election, District 62
Party	Candidate	Votes	%
Republican	William Simanski (Incumbent)	7,600	100%
Total votes		7,600	100.00%
Republican hold			

=== District 63 ===
2014 Connecticut State House of Representatives election, District 63
Party	Candidate	Votes	%
Republican	Jay Case	5,041	63.8%
Independent Party	Jay Case	446	5.6%
Total	Jay Case (Incumbent)	5,487	61.4%
Democratic	Marie Soliani	2,419	30.6%
Total votes		7,906	100.00%
Republican hold			

=== District 64 ===
2014 Connecticut State House of Representatives election, District 64
Party	Candidate	Votes	%
Democratic	Roberta Willis	4,532	47.8%
Working Families	Roberta Willis	263	2.8%
Total	Roberta Willis (Incumbent)	4,795	50.6%
Republican	Brian Ohler	4,264	45.0%
Independent Party	Brian Ohler	415	4.4%
Total	Brian Ohler	4,679	49.4%
Total votes		9,474	100.00%
Democratic hold			

=== District 65 ===
2014 Connecticut State House of Representatives election, District 65
Party	Candidate	Votes	%
Democratic	Michelle Cook	2,531	44.1%
Working Families	Michelle Cook	349	6.1%
Total	Michelle Cook (Incumbent)	2,880	50.1%
Republican	Daniel Farley	2,617	45.6%
Independent Party	Daniel Farley	211	3.7%
Total	Daniel Farley	2,828	49.2%
Unaffiliated	Don Alexander	36	0.6%
Total votes		5,744	100.00%
Democratic hold			

=== District 66 ===
2014 Connecticut State House of Representatives election, District 66
Party	Candidate	Votes	%
Republican	Craig Miner (Incumbent)	6,625	67.3%
Democratic	Marjorie O'Neill	3,223	32.7%
Total votes		9,848	100.00%
Republican hold			

=== District 67 ===
2014 Connecticut State House of Representatives election, District 67
Party	Candidate	Votes	%
Republican	Cecilia Buck-Taylor	4,032	56.6%
Independent Party	Cecilia Buck-Taylor	329	4.6%
Total	Cecilia Buck-Taylor (Incumbent)	4,361	61.2%
Democratic	Gale Alexander	2,436	34.2%
Working Families	Gale Alexander	167	2.3%
Total	Gale Alexander	2,603	36.6%
Green	Cynthia Day	158	2.2%
Total votes		7,122	100.00%
Republican hold			

=== District 68 ===
2014 Connecticut State House of Representatives election, District 68
Party	Candidate	Votes	%
Republican	Eric Berthel	4,670	52.6%
Democratic	Joe Polletta	3,566	40.2%
Independent Party	Joe Polletta	334	3.8%
Working Families	Joe Polletta	312	3.5%
Total	Joe Polletta	3,878	47.4%
Total votes		8,882	100.00%
Republican hold			

=== District 69 ===
2014 Connecticut State House of Representatives election, District 69
Party	Candidate	Votes	%
Republican	Arthur O'Neill (Incumbent)	7,179	100%
Total votes		7,179	100.00%
Republican hold			

=== District 70 ===
2014 Connecticut State House of Representatives election, District 70
Party	Candidate	Votes	%
Republican	Rosa Rebimbas (Incumbent)	4,560	100%
Total votes		4,560	100.00%
Republican hold			

=== District 71 ===
2014 Connecticut State House of Representatives election, District 71
Party	Candidate	Votes	%
Republican	Anthony D'Amelio (Incumbent)	4,623	84.3%
Independent Party	Raymond Rivard	861	15.7%
Total votes		5,484	100.00%
Republican hold			

=== District 72 ===
2014 Connecticut State House of Representatives election, District 72
Party	Candidate	Votes	%
Democratic	Larry Butler (Incumbent)	2,301	66.5%
Republican	Ruben Rodriguez	936	27.1%
Independent Party	Ruben Rodriguez	145	4.2%
Total	Ruben Rodriguez	1,081	31.3%
Unaffiliated	Richard Cam	77	2.2%
Total votes		3,459	100.00%
Democratic hold			

=== District 73 ===
2014 Connecticut State House of Representatives election, District 73
Party	Candidate	Votes	%
Democratic	Jeffrey J. Berger	3,200	71.0%
Working Families	Jeffrey J. Berger	294	6.5%
Total	Jeffrey J. Berger (Incumbent)	3,494	77.5%
Independent Party	Francis Caiazzo Jr.	1,012	22.5%
Total votes		4,506	100.00%
Democratic hold			

=== District 74 ===
2014 Connecticut State House of Representatives election, District 74
Party	Candidate	Votes	%
Republican	Selim Noujaim (Incumbent)	3,228	86.3%
Independent Party	Margaret O'Brien	511	13.7%
Total votes		3,739	100.00%
Republican hold			

=== District 75 ===
2014 Connecticut State House of Representatives election, District 75
Party	Candidate	Votes	%
Democratic	Victor Cuevas (Incumbent)	1,693	81.0%
Independent Party	John Alseph Jr.	396	19.0%
Total votes		2,089	100.00%
Democratic hold			

=== District 76 ===
2014 Connecticut State House of Representatives election, District 76
Party	Candidate	Votes	%
Republican	John Piscopo (Incumbent)	7,189	75.4%
Democratic	Stephen Simonin	2,345	24.6%
Total votes		9,534	100.00%
Republican hold			

=== District 77 ===
2014 Connecticut State House of Representatives election, District 77
Party	Candidate	Votes	%
Republican	Cara Christine Pavalock	3,778	48.3%
Independent Party	Cara Christine Pavalock	305	3.9%
Total	Cara Christine Pavalock	4,083	52.2%
Democratic	Christopher Wright (Incumbent)	3,747	47.9%
Total votes		7,830	100.00%
Republican gain from Democratic			

=== District 78 ===
2014 Connecticut State House of Representatives election, District 78
Party	Candidate	Votes	%
Republican	Whit Betts	4,754	61.6%
Independent Party	Whit Betts	327	4.2%
Total	Whit Betts (Incumbent)	5,081	65.9%
Democratic	Dan Santorso	2,393	31.0%
Working Families	Dan Santorso	242	3.1%
Total	Dan Santorso	2,635	34.2%
Total votes		7,716	100.00%
Republican hold			

=== District 79 ===
2014 Connecticut State House of Representatives election, District 79
Party	Candidate	Votes	%
Democratic	Frank Nicastro (Incumbent)	3,324	58.2%
Republican	Joshua Levesque	2,168	38.0%
Independent Party	Joshua Levesque	220	3.9%
Total	Joshua Levesque	2,388	41.8%
Total votes		5,712	100.00%
Democratic hold			

=== District 80 ===
2014 Connecticut State House of Representatives election, District 80
Party	Candidate	Votes	%
Republican	Robert Sampson	5,440	60.8%
Independent Party	Robert Sampson	331	3.7%
Total	Robert Sampson (Incumbent)	5,771	64.5%
Democratic	Corky Mazurek	2,810	31.4%
Working Families	Corky Mazurek	361	4.o%
Total	Corky Mazurek	3,171	35.5%
Total votes		8,942	100.00%
Republican hold			

=== District 81 ===
2014 Connecticut State House of Representatives election, District 81
Party	Candidate	Votes	%
Democratic	David Zoni	4,041	48.2%
Working Families	David Zoni	401	4.8%
Total	David Zoni (Incumbent)	4,442	53.0%
Republican	Al Natelli	3,941	47.0%
Total votes		8,383	100.00%
Democratic hold			

=== District 82 ===
2014 Connecticut State House of Representatives election, District 82
Party	Candidate	Votes	%
Democratic	Emil Altobello (Incumbent)	4,230	56.9%
Republican	Josh Broekstra	3,205	43.1%
Total votes		7,435	100.00%
Democratic hold			

=== District 83 ===
2014 Connecticut State House of Representatives election, District 83
Party	Candidate	Votes	%
Democratic	Catherine Abercrombie (Incumbent)	4,145	56.1%
Republican	Pablo Soto	3,243	43.9%
Total votes		7,388	100.00%
Democratic hold			

=== District 84 ===
2014 Connecticut State House of Representatives election, District 84
Party	Candidate	Votes	%
Democratic	Hilda Santiago (Incumbent)	2,382	85.7%
Green	Matthew Went	398	14.3%
Total votes		2,780	100.00%
Democratic hold			

=== District 85 ===
2014 Connecticut State House of Representatives election, District 85
Party	Candidate	Votes	%
Democratic	Mary Mushinsky	3,607	50.8%
Working Families	Mary Mushinsky	298	4.2%
Total	Mary Mushinsky (Incumbent)	3,905	55.0%
Republican	Frank Apuzzo Jr.	2,955	41.6%
Independent Party	Frank Apuzzo Jr.	243	3.4%
Total	Frank Apuzzo Jr.	3,198	45.0%
Total votes		7,103	100.00%
Democratic hold			

=== District 86 ===
2014 Connecticut State House of Representatives election, District 86
Party	Candidate	Votes	%
Republican	Vincent Candelora	5,120	85.8%
Independent Party	Vincent Candelora	847	14.2%
Total	Vincent Candelora (Incumbent)	5,967	100%
Total votes		5,967	100.00%
Republican hold			

=== District 87 ===
2014 Connecticut State House of Representatives election, District 87
Party	Candidate	Votes	%
Republican	Dave Yaccarino	6,012	64.9%
Independent Party	Dave Yaccarino	557	6.0%
Total	Dave Yaccarino (Incumbent)	6,569	70.9%
Democratic	Alden Mead	2,523	27.2%
Working Families	Alden Mead	179	1.9%
Total	Alden Mead	2,702	29.1%
Total votes		9,271	100.00%
Republican hold			

=== District 88 ===
2014 Connecticut State House of Representatives election, District 88
Party	Candidate	Votes	%
Democratic	Brendan Sharkey (Incumbent)	4,641	66.6%
Republican	Matthew Corcoran	2,325	33.4%
Total votes		6,966	100.00%
Democratic hold			

=== District 89 ===
2014 Connecticut State House of Representatives election, District 89
Party	Candidate	Votes	%
Republican	Lezlye Zupkus	5,657	56.6%
Independent Party	Lezlye Zupkus	288	2.9%
Total	Lezlye Zupkus (Incumbent)	5,915	59.5%
Democratic	Vickie Orsini Nardello	3,727	37.3%
Working Families	Vickie Orsini Nardello	315	3.2%
Total	Vickie Orsini Nardello	3,042	40.5%
Total votes		8,957	100.00%
Republican hold			

=== District 90 ===
2014 Connecticut State House of Representatives election, District 90
Party	Candidate	Votes	%
Democratic	Mary Fritz (Incumbent)	4,829	55.8%
Republican	Richard Abbate	3,823	44.2%
Total votes		8,652	100.00%
Democratic hold			

=== District 91 ===
2014 Connecticut State House of Representatives election, District 91
Party	Candidate	Votes	%
Democratic	Michael D'Agostino (Incumbent)	6,233	100%
Total votes		6,233	100.00%
Democratic hold			

=== District 92 ===
2014 Connecticut State House of Representatives election, District 92
Party	Candidate	Votes	%
Democratic	Patricia Dillon	4,961	84.1%
Working Families	Patricia Dillon	329	5.6%
Total	Patricia Dillon (Incumbent)	5,290	89.7%
Republican	James O'Connell	606	10.3%
Total votes		5,896	100.00%
Democratic hold			

=== District 93 ===
2014 Connecticut State House of Representatives election, District 93
Party	Candidate	Votes	%
Democratic	Toni Walker (Incumbent)	3,774	100%
Total votes		3,774	100.00%
Democratic hold			

=== District 94 ===
2014 Connecticut State House of Representatives election, District 94
Party	Candidate	Votes	%
Democratic	Robyn Porter	4,475	90.8%
Working Families	Robyn Porter	242	4.9%
Total	Robyn Porter (Incumbent)	4,717	95.7%
Green	David Olszta	214	4.3%
Total votes		4,931	100.00%
Democratic hold			

=== District 95 ===
2014 Connecticut State House of Representatives election, District 95
Party	Candidate	Votes	%
Democratic	Juan Candelaria (Incumbent)	2,891	100%
Total votes		2,891	100.00%
Democratic hold			

=== District 96 ===
2014 Connecticut State House of Representatives election, District 96
Party	Candidate	Votes	%
Democratic	Roland Lemar	4,541	88.6%
Working Families	Roland Lemar	584	11.4%
Total	Roland Lemar (Incumbent)	5,125	100%
Total votes		5,125	100.00%
Democratic hold			

=== District 97 ===
2014 Connecticut State House of Representatives election, District 97
Party	Candidate	Votes	%
Democratic	Robert Megna	3,334	69.2%
Working Families	Robert Megna	220	4.6%
Total	Robert Megna (Incumbent)	3,554	73.8%
Republican	John Cirello	1,053	21.8%
Independent Party	John Cirello	214	4.4%
Total	John Cirello	1,267	26.2%
Total votes		4,821	100.00%
Democratic hold			

=== District 98 ===
2014 Connecticut State House of Representatives election, District 98
Party	Candidate	Votes	%
Democratic	Sean Scanlon	5,421	52.1%
Working Families	Sean Scanlon	240	2.3%
Total	Sean Scanlon	5,661	54.4%
Republican	Cindy Cartier	4,469	43.0%
Independent Party	Cindy Cartier	269	2.6%
Total	Cindy Cartier	4,738	45.6%
Total votes		10,399	100.00%
Democratic hold			

=== District 99 ===
2014 Connecticut State House of Representatives election, District 99
Party	Candidate	Votes	%
Democratic	James Albis	3,876	59.2%
Working Families	James Albis	343	5.2%
Independent Party	James Albis	190	2.9%
Total	James Albis (Incumbent)	4,409	67.3%
Republican	Stacy Gravino	3,876	32.7%
Total votes		8,285	100.00%
Democratic hold			

=== District 100 ===
2014 Connecticut State House of Representatives election, District 100
Party	Candidate	Votes	%
Democratic	Matt Lesser	4,558	63.0%
Working Families	Matt Lesser	537	7.4%
Total	Matt Lesser (Incumbent)	5,095	70.4%
Republican	Angel Fernandez	2,138	29.6%
Total votes		7,233	100.00%
Democratic hold			

=== District 101 ===
2014 Connecticut State House of Representatives election, District 101
Party	Candidate	Votes	%
Republican	Noreen Kokoruda	5,329	53.8%
Independent Party	Noreen Kokoruda	289	2.9%
Total	Noreen Kokoruda (Incumbent)	5,618	56.7%
Democratic	Alex Taubes	5,329	43.3%
Total votes		10,947	100.00%
Republican hold			

=== District 102 ===
2014 Connecticut State House of Representatives election, District 102
Party	Candidate	Votes	%
Democratic	Lonnie Reed (Incumbent)	4,417	53.3%
Republican	Paul Cianci	3,623	43.8%
Independent Party	Paul Cianci	241	2.9%
Total	Paul Cianci	3,864	46.7%
Total votes		8,281	100.00%
Democratic hold			

=== District 103 ===
2014 Connecticut State House of Representatives election, District 103
Party	Candidate	Votes	%
Republican	Andrew Falvey	4,348	52.9%
Independent Party	Andrew Falvey	313	3.8%
Total	Al Adinolfi (Incumbent)	4,661	56.7%
Democratic	Kristen Selleck	3,554	43.3%
Total votes		8,215	100.00%
Republican hold			

=== District 104 ===
2014 Connecticut State House of Representatives election, District 104
Party	Candidate	Votes	%
Democratic	Linda Gentile	3,323	60.5%
Working Families	Linda Gentile	325	5.9%
Total	Linda Gentile (Incumbent)	3,648	66.4%
Republican	Joseph Jaunmann	1,848	33.6%
Total votes		5,496	100.00%
Democratic hold			

=== District 105 ===
2014 Connecticut State House of Representatives election, District 105
Party	Candidate	Votes	%
Democratic	Theresa Conroy	4,171	53.7%
Working Families	Theresa Conroy	449	5.8%
Total	Theresa Conroy (Incumbent)	4,620	59.5%
Republican	Robert Willis	3,149	40.5%
Total votes		7,769	100.00%
Democratic hold			

=== District 106 ===
2014 Connecticut State House of Representatives election, District 106
Party	Candidate	Votes	%
Republican	Mitch Bolinsky (Incumbent)	4,661	55.4%
Democratic	Matt Cole	3,753	44.6%
Total votes		8,414	100.00%
Republican hold			

=== District 107 ===
2014 Connecticut State House of Representatives election, District 107
Party	Candidate	Votes	%
Republican	David Scribner	5,476	64.6%
Independent Party	David Scribner	463	5.5%
Total	David Scribner (Incumbent)	5,929	70.1%
Democratic	Dan Smolnik	2,374	28.0%
Independent Party	Dan Smolnik	164	1.9%
Total	Dan Smolnik	2,538	29.9%
Total votes		8,467	100.00%
Republican hold			

=== District 108 ===
2014 Connecticut State House of Representatives election, District 108
Party	Candidate	Votes	%
Republican	Richard A. Smith (Incumbent)	4,951	100%
Total votes		4,951	100.00%
Republican hold			

=== District 109 ===
2014 Connecticut State House of Representatives election, District 109
Party	Candidate	Votes	%
Democratic	David Arconti	2,722	57.3%
Working Families	David Arconti	205	4.3%
Total	David Arconti (Incumbent)	2,927	61.6%
Republican	Josh Stanley	1,680	35.4%
Independent Party	Josh Stanley	144	3.0%
Total	Josh Stanley	1,824	38.4%
Total votes		4,751	100.00%
Democratic hold			

=== District 110 ===
2014 Connecticut State House of Representatives election, District 110
Party	Candidate	Votes	%
Democratic	Bob Godfrey	1,759	64.2%
Working Families	Bob Godfrey	146	5.3%
Total	Bob Godfrey (Incumbent)	1,905	69.5%
Republican	Frank Goncalves	834	30.5%
Total votes		2,739	100.00%
Democratic hold			

=== District 111 ===
2014 Connecticut State House of Representatives election, District 111
Party	Candidate	Votes	%
Republican	John H. Frey (Incumbent)	6,511	74.3%
Democratic	Sky Cole	2,257	25.7%
Total votes		8,868	100.00%
Republican hold			

=== District 112 ===
2014 Connecticut State House of Representatives election, District 112
Party	Candidate	Votes	%
Republican	J.P. Sredzinski	4,460	54.3%
Independent Party	J.P. Sredzinski	181	2.2%
Total	J.P. Sredzinski	4,641	56.5%
Democratic	Jen Aguilar	3,578	43.5%
Total votes		8,219	100.00%
Republican hold			

=== District 113 ===
2014 Connecticut State House of Representatives election, District 113
Party	Candidate	Votes	%
Republican	Jason Perillo (Incumbent)	5,695	100%
Total votes		5,695	100.00%
Republican hold			

=== District 114 ===
2014 Connecticut State House of Representatives election, District 114
Party	Candidate	Votes	%
Republican	Themis Klarides	5,487	62.4%
Independent Party	Themis Klarides	362	4.1%
Total	Themis Klarides (Incumbent)	5,849	66.5%
Democratic	Aldon Hynes	2,759	31.4%
Working Families	Aldon Hynes	186	2.1%
Total	Aldon Hynes	2,945	33.5%
Total votes		8,794	100.00%
Republican hold			

=== District 115 ===
2014 Connecticut State House of Representatives election, District 115
Party	Candidate	Votes	%
Democratic	Stephen Dargan	4,058	90.4%
Working Families	Stephen Dargan	432	9.6%
Total	Stephen Dargan (Incumbent)	4,490	100%
Total votes		4,490	100.00%
Democratic hold			

=== District 116 ===
2014 Connecticut State House of Representatives election, District 116
Party	Candidate	Votes	%
Democratic	Louis Esposito Jr.	2,617	64.3%
Working Families	Louis Esposito Jr.	145	3.6%
Total	Louis Esposito Jr. (Incumbent)	2,762	67.9%
Republican	Steven Mullins	954	23.4%
Independent Party	Steven Mullins	327	8.0%
Total	Steven Mullins	1,281	31.4%
Petitioning	Aaron Haley	27	0.7%
Total votes		4,070	100.00%
Democratic hold			

=== District 117 ===
2014 Connecticut State House of Representatives election, District 117
Party	Candidate	Votes	%
Republican	Charles Ferraro	3,946	46.9%
Independent Party	Charles Ferraro	335	4.0%
Total	Charles Ferraro	4,281	50.8%
Democratic	Paul Davis (Incumbent)	4,138	49.2%
Total votes		8,419	100.00%
Republican gain from Democratic			

=== District 118 ===
2014 Connecticut State House of Representatives election, District 118
Party	Candidate	Votes	%
Democratic	Kim Rose	3,672	50.1%
Working Families	Kim Rose	237	3.2%
Total	Kim Rose (Incumbent)	3,909	53.3%
Republican	Ray Vitali	3,159	43.1%
Independent Party	Ray Vitali	258	3.5%
Total	Ray Vitali	3,417	46.6%
Total votes		7,326	100.00%
Democratic hold			

=== District 119 ===
2014 Connecticut State House of Representatives election, District 119
Party	Candidate	Votes	%
Republican	Pam Staneski	4,170	48.0%
Independent Party	Pam Staneski	253	2.9%
Total	Pam Staneski	4,423	50.9%
Democratic	James Maroney (Incumbent)	4,272	49.1%
Total votes		8,695	100.00%
Republican gain from Democratic			

=== District 120 ===
2014 Connecticut State House of Representatives election, District 120
Party	Candidate	Votes	%
Republican	Laura Hoydick	4,958	62.8%
Independent Party	Laura Hoydick	273	3.5%
Total	Laura Hoydick (Incumbent)	5,231	33.8%
Democratic	Robert Bradley	2,665	33.8%
Total votes		7,896	100.00%
Republican hold			

=== District 121 ===
2014 Connecticut State House of Representatives election, District 121
Party	Candidate	Votes	%
Democratic	Terry Backer (Incumbent)	3,893	71.5%
Republican	Richard Fredette	1,552	28.5%
Total votes		5,445	100.00%
Democratic hold			

=== District 122 ===
2014 Connecticut State House of Representatives election, District 122
Party	Candidate	Votes	%
Republican	Ben McGorty (Incumbent)	5,907	84.1%
Green	Kelly Hanna	692	9.8%
Unaffiliated	Cheryl Jansen	428	6.1%
Total votes		7,027	100.00%
Republican hold			

=== District 123 ===
2014 Connecticut State House of Representatives election, District 123
Party	Candidate	Votes	%
Republican	David Rutigliano	5,055	59.6%
Independent Party	David Rutigliano	220	2.6%
Total	David Rutigliano (Incumbent)	5,275	62.2%
Democratic	Douglas Sutherland	3,016	35.6%
Working Families	Douglas Sutherland	187	2.2%
Total	Douglas Sutherland	3,203	37.8%
Total votes		8,478	100.00%
Republican hold			

=== District 124 ===
2014 Connecticut State House of Representatives election, District 124
Party	Candidate	Votes	%
Democratic	Andre Baker (Incumbent)	2,721	100%
Total votes		2,721	100.00%
Democratic hold			

=== District 125 ===
2014 Connecticut State House of Representatives election, District 125
Party	Candidate	Votes	%
Republican	Tom O'Dea (Incumbent)	6,073	88.0%
Green	David Bedell	825	12.0%
Total votes		6,898	100.00%
Republican hold			

=== District 126 ===
2014 Connecticut State House of Representatives election, District 126
Party	Candidate	Votes	%
Democratic	Charlie Stallworth (Incumbent)	3,645	100%
Total votes		3,645	100.00%
Democratic hold			

=== District 127 ===
2014 Connecticut State House of Representatives election, District 127
Party	Candidate	Votes	%
Democratic	Jack Hennessy	2,911	87.8%
Working Families	Jack Hennessy	406	12.2%
Total	Jack Hennessy (Incumbent)	3,317	100%
Total votes		3,317	100.00%
Democratic hold			

=== District 128 ===
2014 Connecticut State House of Representatives election, District 128
Party	Candidate	Votes	%
Democratic	Christopher Rosario	1,504	78.3%
Republican	Ethan Book	242	12.6%
Peace and Progress	Angel Reyes	174	9.1%
Total votes		1,920	100.00%
Democratic hold			

=== District 129 ===
2014 Connecticut State House of Representatives election, District 129
Party	Candidate	Votes	%
Democratic	Auden Grogins (Incumbent)	3,149	100%
Total votes		3,149	100.00%
Democratic hold			

=== District 130 ===
2014 Connecticut State House of Representatives election, District 130
Party	Candidate	Votes	%
Democratic	Ezequiel Santiago (Incumbent)	1,972	83.0%
Republican	David Goodman	308	13.0%
Peace and Progress	Joel Gonzalez	95	4.0%
Total votes		1,375	100.00%
Democratic hold			

=== District 131 ===
2014 Connecticut State House of Representatives election, District 131
Party	Candidate	Votes	%
Republican	David Labriola (Incumbent)	6,067	100%
Total votes		6,067	100.00%
Republican hold			

=== District 132 ===
2014 Connecticut State House of Representatives election, District 132
Party	Candidate	Votes	%
Republican	Brenda Kupchick	5,233	58.3%
Independent Party	Brenda Kupchick	349	3.9%
Total	Brenda Kupchick (Incumbent)	5,582	62.1%
Democratic	Kevin Coyner	3,233	36.0%
Working Families	Kevin Coyner	169	1.9%
Total	Kevin Coyner	3,402	37.9%
Total votes		8,984	100.00%
Republican hold			

=== District 133 ===
2014 Connecticut State House of Representatives election, District 133
Party	Candidate	Votes	%
Democratic	Cristin McCarthy Vahey	3,827	56.2%
Working Families	Cristin McCarthy Vahey	276	4.1%
Total	Cristin McCarthy Vahey	4,103	60.2%
Republican	Carol Way	2,711	39.8%
Total votes		6,814	100.00%
Democratic hold			

=== District 134 ===
2014 Connecticut State House of Representatives election, District 134
Party	Candidate	Votes	%
Republican	Laura Devlin	4,353	51.0%
Independent Party	Laura Devlin	191	2.2%
Total	Laura Devlin	4,544	53.2%
Democratic	Tara Cook-Littman	3,989	46.8%
Total votes		8,533	100.00%
Republican hold			

=== District 135 ===
2014 Connecticut State House of Representatives election, District 135
Party	Candidate	Votes	%
Republican	John Shaban (Incumbent)	5,578	81.3%
Green	Bonnie Troy	1,287	18.7%
Total votes		6,865	100.00%
Republican hold			

=== District 136 ===
2014 Connecticut State House of Representatives election, District 136
Party	Candidate	Votes	%
Democratic	Jonathan Steinberg (Incumebnt)	5,009	55.0%
Republican	Brandi Briggs	3,887	42.7%
Independent Party	Brandi Briggs	216	2.4%
Total	Brandi Briggs	4,103	50.0%
Total votes		9,112	100.00%
Democratic hold			

=== District 137 ===
2014 Connecticut State House of Representatives election, District 137
Party	Candidate	Votes	%
Democratic	Chris Perone	3,718	63.7%
Working Families	Chris Perone	260	4.5%
Total	Chris Perone (Incumbent)	3,978	68.1%
Republican	Arthur Scialabba	1,860	31.9%
Total votes		5,838	100.00%
Democratic hold			

=== District 138 ===
2014 Connecticut State House of Representatives election, District 138
Party	Candidate	Votes	%
Republican	Janice Giegler	3,715	57.8%
Independent Party	Janice Giegler	398	6.2%
Total	Janice Giegler (Incumbent)	4,113	64.0%
Democratic	Henry Hall	2,311	36.0%
Total votes		6,424	100.00%
Republican hold			

=== District 139 ===
2014 Connecticut State House of Representatives election, District 139
Party	Candidate	Votes	%
Democratic	Kevin Ryan	3,557	57.7%
Working Families	Kevin Ryan	391	6.4%
Total	Kevin Ryan (Incumbent)	3,948	64.1%
Republican	Jonathan Gilman	2,213	35.9%
Total votes		6,161	100.00%
Democratic hold			

=== District 140 ===
2014 Connecticut State House of Representatives election, District 140
Party	Candidate	Votes	%
Democratic	Bruce V. Morris	2,776	92.0%
Working Families	Bruce V. Morris	242	8.0%
Total	Bruce V. Morris (Incumbent)	3,018	100%
Total votes		3,018	100.00%
Democratic hold			

=== District 141 ===
2014 Connecticut State House of Representatives election, District 141
Party	Candidate	Votes	%
Republican	Terrie Wood (Incumbent)	6,078	100%
Total votes		6,078	100.00%
Republican hold			

=== District 142 ===
2014 Connecticut State House of Representatives election, District 142
Party	Candidate	Votes	%
Republican	Fred Wilms	4,074	52.4%
Independent Party	Fred Wilms	202	2.6%
Total	Fred Wilms	4,276	55.0%
Democratic	Andy Garfunkel	3,337	42.9%
Working Families	Andy Garfunkel	162	2.1%
Total	Andy Garfunkel	3,499	45.0%
Total votes		4,775	100.00%
Republican hold			

=== District 143 ===
2014 Connecticut State House of Representatives election, District 143
Party	Candidate	Votes	%
Republican	Gail Lavielle (Incumbent)	5,880	66.6%
Democratic	Keith Rodgerson	2,943	33.4%
Total votes		8,823	100.00%
Republican hold			

=== District 144 ===
2014 Connecticut State House of Representatives election, District 144
Party	Candidate	Votes	%
Democratic	Caroline Simmons	3,752	53.8%
Republican	Michael Molgano (Incumbent)	3,224	46.2%
Total votes		6,976	100.00%
Democratic gain from Republican			

=== District 145 ===
2014 Connecticut State House of Representatives election, District 145
Party	Candidate	Votes	%
Democratic	Patricia Billie Miller (Incumbent)	2,681	76.6%
Republican	Carol Ann McClean	819	23.4%
Total votes		3,500	100.00%
Democratic hold			

=== District 146 ===
2014 Connecticut State House of Representatives election, District 146
Party	Candidate	Votes	%
Democratic	Terry B. Adams (Incumbent)	2,447	54.4%
Republican	Kieran Ryan	1,888	42.0%
Independent Party	Kieran Ryan	161	3.6%
Total	Kieran Ryan	2,049	45.6%
Total votes		2,496	100.00%
Democratic hold			

=== District 147 ===
2014 Connecticut State House of Representatives election, District 147
Party	Candidate	Votes	%
Democratic	William Tong (Incumbent)	3,905	51.0%
Republican	Dennis Mahoney	3,553	46.4%
Independent Party	Dennis Mahoney	198	2.6%
Total	Dennis Mahoney	3,751	49.0%
Total votes		7,656	100.00%
Democratic hold			

=== District 148 ===
2014 Connecticut State House of Representatives election, District 148
Party	Candidate	Votes	%
Democratic	Daniel J. Fox (Incumbent)	2,967	66.9%
Republican	Benjamin Aponte	1,283	28.9%
Independent Party	Benjamin Aponte	120	2.7%
Total	Benjamin Aponte	1,403	31.6%
Green	Nathan Cloutier	66	1.5%
Total votes		4,438	100.00%
Democratic hold			

=== District 149 ===
2014 Connecticut State House of Representatives election, District 149
Party	Candidate	Votes	%
Republican	Livvy Floren (Incumbent)	5,554	100%
Total votes		5,554	100.00%
Republican hold			

=== District 150 ===
2014 Connecticut State House of Representatives election, District 150
Party	Candidate	Votes	%
Republican	Mike Bocchino	3,363	51.9%
Democratic	Jill Oberlander	3,119	48.1%
Total votes		6,482	100.00%
Republican hold			

=== District 151 ===
2014 Connecticut State House of Representatives election, District 151
Party	Candidate	Votes	%
Republican	Fred Camillo (Incumbent)	5,909	100%
Total votes		5,909	100.00%
Republican hold			
