= Fahrbach (surname) =

Fahrbach is a surname. Notable people with the surname include:

- Philipp Fahrbach Jr. (1843–1894), Austrian conductor and composer
- Philipp Fahrbach Sr. (1815–1885), Austrian musician
- Ruth Fahrbach (born 1942), American politician from Connecticut
