= Cathy Cook (politician) =

American politician

Member of the Connecticut Senate from the 18th district
- In office 1993–2007
- Preceded by: Steven Spellman
- Succeeded by: Andrew M. Maynard

Personal details
- Born: 1949 or 1950 (age 75–76)
- Party: Republican

Catherine Welles Cook (born 1949 or 1950) is a former American politician who served in the Connecticut State Senate from 1993 to 2007, representing the 18th district as a Republican. She lived in Mystic during her tenure.

== Early life ==
Cook was born in 1949 or 1950.

== Career ==
Cook served on her local school board for eight years before entering state politics.

After being elected to the Connecticut State Senate, representing the 18th district, in 1993, Cook helped to bring in for training in sexual harassment for all legislators and their staff. In the same year, she was nominated by Nancy Johnson to serve on President Clinton's Defense Conversion Committee. In May of that year, she was focusing on a number of economic and international trade issues, with her district being particularly dependent on the defense industry. She was a member of the state Commerce Committee.

She won a third term in office in November 1996. She was the district's only Republican state senator. At the time, she was CFO at a New London law firm.

In 2007, she put forward a plan to help rebuild the population of lobsters in the state, in which the fishers would be paid to put female lobsters back into the sea.

After an unsuccessful run for state comptroller in November 2006 to Democrat Andrew M. Maynard, she was appointed as the inaugural director of community affairs and volunteer services in the Connecticut Department of Veterans Affairs.

She lived in Mystic during her tenure.

== Other activities ==
After retiring from politics, she ran a public access TV show called Capitol Ideas, which aired on Comcast Channel 12 and Thames Valley Communications.

== Recognition ==
In 1993 The Christian Science Monitor called Cook one of "Connecticut's Powerful Women".
