= Senator Maynard =

Senator Maynard may refer to:

- Andrew M. Maynard (born 1962), Connecticut State Senate
- Harry L. Maynard (1861–1922), Virginia State Senate
- John Maynard (New York politician) (1786–1850), New York State Senate
- Mark R. Maynard (born 1972), West Virginia State Senate
- William H. Maynard (1786–1832), New York State Senate
