= Jane Wisialowski =

American politician

Member-elect of the Connecticut House of Representatives from the 23rd district
- Assuming office January 2027
- Succeeding: Devin Carney

Personal details
- Party: Democratic
- Website: Campaign website

Jane Wisialowski is an American politician. A member of the Democratic Party, she is the member-elect for the 23rd district of the Connecticut House of Representatives. She was elected at the 2026 election. She was a candidate in 2024. She is chair of the Board of Selectman in Old Saybrook, Connecticut. She has worked in business development.
