= Lenny Winkler =

American politician

Member of the Connecticut House of Representatives from the 41st district
- In office 1988–2007
- Preceded by: Muriel Buckley
- Succeeded by: Elissa Wright

Personal details
- Born: New London, Connecticut, U.S.
- Party: Republican

Lenny T. Winkler is an American politician who served in the Connecticut House of Representatives from 1988 to 2007, representing the 41st district as a Republican.

== Political career ==
Winkler became active in Connecticut politics in 1983 when she was elected to Groton's board of education, where she served until 1998. She was also a part of the Groton Republican Town Committee.

Winkler was first elected to the Connecticut House of Representatives in a March 1988 special election following the death of her predecessor, Muriel Buckley, and she served for eight terms representing the 41st district as a Republican. Winkler did not run for reelection to the House of Representatives in 2006, instead running to represent the 18th district in the Connecticut State Senate. She was defeated by Democratic candidate Andrew M. Maynard and left office in 2007.

In 2010, at the encouragement of Thomas C. Foley, Winkler ran for lieutenant governor of Connecticut, but she was defeated by Mark D. Boughton in her bid for the Republican nomination.
