= Connecticut's 122nd House of Representatives district =

American legislative district

Connecticut's 122nd State House of Representatives district
Representative
Ben McGorty; R

Connecticut's 122nd House of Representatives district elects one member of the Connecticut House of Representatives. It encompasses parts of Shelton, Stratford, and Trumbull. It has been represented by Republican Ben McGorty since 2014.

== List of representatives ==
List of Representatives from Connecticut's 122nd State House District
Representative	Party	Years	District home	Note
Gerald F. Stevens	Republican	1967–1973	Milford	Seat created
William A. Bevacqua	Republican	1973–1975	Trumbull	
John B. Alessie	Democratic	1975–1977	Stratford	
Robert G. Jaekle	Republican	1977–1991	Stratford	
Lawrence G. Miller	Republican	1991–2014	Stratford	Died in office
Ben McGorty	Republican	2014–present	Shelton	Elected in a special election
Mandy Kilmartin	Democratic	2027 member elect		

== Recent elections ==
=== 2020 ===
2020 Connecticut State House of Representatives election, District 122
Party	Candidate	Votes	%
Republican	Ben McGorty (incumbent)	8,673	59.11
Democratic	Jose Goncalves	6,000	40.89
Total votes		14,673	100.00
Republican hold			

=== 2018 ===
2018 Connecticut House of Representatives election, District 122
Party	Candidate	Votes	%
Republican	Ben McGorty (Incumbent)	7,006	61.3
Democratic	Jose Goncalves	4,430	38.7
Total votes		11,436	100.00
Republican hold			

=== 2016 ===
2016 Connecticut House of Representatives election, District 122
Party	Candidate	Votes	%
Republican	Ben McGorty (Incumbent)	8,996	86.2
Green	Angela Capinera	1,440	13.8
Total votes		11,436	100.00
Republican hold			

=== 2014 ===
2014 Connecticut House of Representatives election, District 122
Party	Candidate	Votes	%
Republican	Ben McGorty (Incumbent)	5,907	84.1
Green	Kelly Hanna	692	9.8
Nonpartisan	Cheryl S. Jansen	428	6.1
Total votes		7,027	100.00
Republican hold			

=== 2014 special ===
2014 Connecticut House of Representatives special elections, District 122
Party	Candidate	Votes	%
Republican	Ben McGorty	1,403	75.3
Democratic	Arlene Liscinsky	459	24.7
Total votes		1,862	100.00
Republican hold			

=== 2012 ===
2012 Connecticut House of Representatives election, District 122
Party	Candidate	Votes	%
Republican	Lawrence G. Miller (Incumbent)	7,767	100.00
Total votes		7,767	100.00
Republican hold			
