= Shaun McNally =

American politician (born 1957)

Member of the Connecticut House of Representatives from the 47th district
- In office 1987–1993
- Preceded by: Peter V. Cuprak
- Succeeded by: Barry Kolar

Personal details
- Born: December 10, 1957 (age 68) Derby, Connecticut, U.S.
- Party: Democratic

Shaun McNally (born December 10, 1957) is an American politician who served in the Connecticut House of Representatives from 1987 to 1993, representing the 47th district as a Democrat.

During his service in the state legislature, McNally served as House Chair the Planning and Development Committee. He also served as a member of the Finance, Commerce, Judiciary and Human Services committees.

== Personal life and education ==
McNally was born in Derby, Connecticut. He holds a B.A. in political science from the University of Connecticut and a Master of Public Administration degree from Harvard University's John F. Kennedy School of Government.

McNally has one daughter.

== Political career ==
=== Connecticut ===
McNally was a staff member for former U.S. Representative Sam Gejdenson from 1981 to 1982, and on the Chris Dodd Senate campaign in 1980.

McNally was elected to the Connecticut House of Representatives in 1986, and he served three terms representing the 47th district as a Democrat. McNally did not run for reelection in 1992 and was succeeded by Republican candidate Barry Kolar.

In 2004, McNally ran unsuccessfully for United States Congress in Connecticut's 2nd congressional district. He was defeated in the Democratic primary by candidate Jim Sullivan.

From 1995 to 2003, he was director of public affairs and chief internet strategist for the Connecticut Business and Industry Association (CBIA). From 2008 to 2009, McNally served as executive director of the Connecticut Early Childhood Alliance, a coalition of organizations advocating for high-quality early childhood education.

=== Federal work ===
In 2005, McNally joined the USAID Mission in Iraq as Food Security Advisor for the Food for Peace program. McNally later returned to Iraq as technical advisor and Deputy Chief of Party for the Local Governance Program (LGP3) (2009-2011) and later as technical advisor for the USAID-funded Government Strengthening Program (GSP) (2012-2013).

Currently, McNally serves as Chief of Party for the USAID Strengthening Somali Governance (SSG) program. From 2013 to 2015, he led a parliamentary strengthening program in Armenia (SANAP). From 2011 to 2012, he served as Chief of Party for the USAID/Afghanistan local governance strengthening program for the nine provinces of ISAF-North (RAMP-UP).

=== Non-governmental organizations ===
From 2006 to 2007, McNally was Country Director and Chief of Party for the National Democratic Institute for International Affairs (NDI) democracy and governance programs for Albania. The program worked with civil society groups, political parties, journalists, mayors and members of parliament, as well as supporting election monitoring.
