= Muriel Buckley =

American politician (died 1988)

Member of the Connecticut House of Representatives from the 41st district
- In office 1981 – January 30, 1988
- Preceded by: Phyllis Kipp
- Succeeded by: Lenny Winkler

Personal details
- Born: Brooklyn, New York, U.S.
- Died: January 30, 1988 New London, Connecticut, U.S.
- Party: Republican

Muriel W. Buckley (died January 30, 1988) was an American politician who served in the Connecticut House of Representatives from 1981 to her death in office in 1988, representing the 41st district as a Republican.

== Personal life ==
Buckley was born in Brooklyn, New York.

Buckley died of complications of a stroke at Lawrence + Memorial Hospital in New London, Connecticut, on January 30, 1988. At the time of her death, she was a resident of the Mumford Cove neighborhood of Groton.

== Political career ==
Buckley was first elected to the Connecticut House of Representatives in 1980 to represent the 41st district as a Republican, and she served until her death in office in 1988 during her fourth term. She was succeeded by fellow Republican Lenny Winkler, who was elected in a March 1988 special election.
