= Ruth Truex =

American politician (1912–2003)

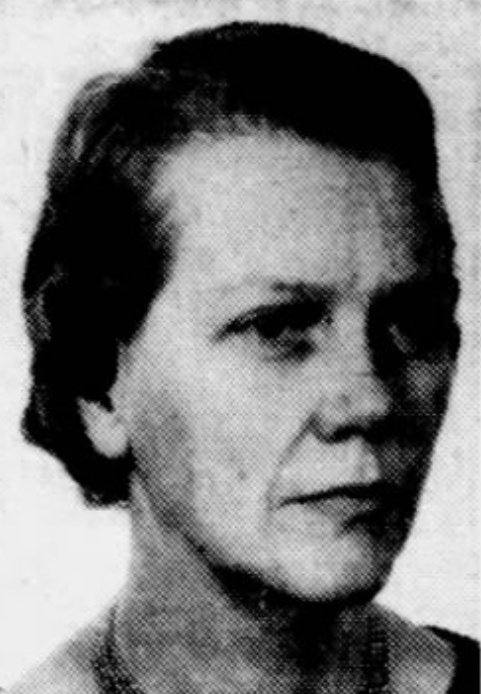

Member of the Connecticut House of Representatives from the 23rd district
- In office 1967–1973
- Preceded by: Seat created
- Succeeded by: Dominic J. Badolato

Member of the Connecticut Senate from the 9th district
- In office 1973–1975
- Preceded by: Roger W. Eddy
- Succeeded by: J. Martin Hennessey

Personal details
- Born: Ruth Olmsted; August 10, 1912 East Hartford, Connecticut, U.S.
- Died: September 3, 2003 (aged 91) Wethersfield, Connecticut, U.S.
- Party: Republican
- Spouse: Ted Truex
- Children: 4
- Education: Mount Holyoke College (B.A.), (M.A.)

Ruth Truex (August 10, 1912 – September 3, 2003) was an American politician who served in the Connecticut House of Representatives from 1967 to 1973, and in the Connecticut State Senate from 1973 to 1975.

== Personal life and education ==
Truex was born Ruth Olmsted in East Hartford, Connecticut, on August 10, 1912. She attended Mount Holyoke College, where she subsequently taught economics and sociology. From 1938 to 1941, she worked as a research assistant at the Yale Institute of International Studies. She was married to Ted Truex, and they had four children.

Truex died on September 3, 2003, in Wethersfield, Connecticut. She was 91.

== Career ==
Truex entered Connecticut politics in 1956, when she was elected to Wethersfield's board of education. She remained on the board until 1966, when she was elected to the Connecticut House of Representatives. She served three terms representing the 23rd district as a Republican.

Truex did not run for reelection to the House of Representatives in 1972, instead running for the Connecticut State Senate. She won her race and was elected to represent the 9th State Senate district, where she served one term. She did not run for reelection in 1974 and was succeeded by J. Martin Hennessey.
