= Marilyn Giuliano =

American politician

Member of the Connecticut House of Representatives from the 23rd district
- In office 2002 – January 7, 2015
- Succeeded by: Devin Carney

Marilyn Giuliano (born July 14, 1953) is an American politician who served as a member of the Connecticut House of Representatives from 2002 to 2015, representing the 23rd district.

Giuliano was born in Wallingford, Connecticut, on July 14, 1953. She graduated from Southern Connecticut State University.

== Career ==
Giuliano is a Republican. She was first elected to the Connecticut House of Representatives in 2002 and represented the 23rd district until January 2015. Giuliano did not seek reelection in the 2014 Connecticut House of Representatives election.
