= Connecticut's 47th House of Representatives district =

American legislative district

Connecticut's 47th State House of Representatives district
Representative
Doug Dubitsky; R

Connecticut's 47th House of Representatives district elects one member of the Connecticut House of Representatives. It consists of the communities of Canterbury, Chaplin, Franklin, Hampton, Lisbon (part), Lebanon (part), Norwich (part), Scotland, Sprague, and Plainfield (part). It has been represented by Republican Doug Dubitsky since 2015.

== List of representatives ==
List of Representatives from Connecticut's 47th State House District
Representative	Party	Years	District home	Note
Gerald Allen	Democratic	1967–1971	Vernon	Seat created
Thomas H. Dooley	Democratic	1971–1973	Vernon	
Leo H. Flynn	Democratic	1973–1985	Taftville	
Peter V. Cuprak	Republican	1985–1987	Norwich	
Shaun McNally	Democratic	1987–1993	Norwich	
Barry Kolar	Republican	1993–1995	Sprague	
Jack Malone	Democratic	1995–2009	Norwich	
Christopher Coutu	Republican	2009–2013	Norwich	
Brian Sear	Democratic	2013–2015	Canterbury	
Doug Dubitsky	Republican	2015–	Chaplin	

== Recent elections ==
=== 2020 ===
2020 Connecticut State House of Representatives election, District 47
Party	Candidate	Votes	%
Republican	Doug Dubitsky (incumbent)	7,315	53.97
Democratic	Kate Donnelly	5,556	40.99
Independent Party	Doug Dubitsky (incumbent)	357	2.63
Working Families	Kate Donnelly	326	2.41
Total votes		13,554	100.00
Republican hold			

=== 2018 ===
2018 Connecticut House of Representatives election, District 47
Party	Candidate	Votes	%
Republican	Doug Dubitsky (Incumbent)	6,157	56.8
Democratic	Kate Donnelly	4,678	43.2
Total votes		10,835	100.00
Republican hold			

=== 2016 ===
2016 Connecticut House of Representatives election, District 47
Party	Candidate	Votes	%
Republican	Doug Dubitsky (Incumbent)	7,323	59.82
Democratic	Kate Donnelly	4,918	40.18
Total votes		12,241	100.00
Republican hold			

=== 2014 ===
2014 Connecticut House of Representatives election, District 47
Party	Candidate	Votes	%
Republican	Doug Dubitsky	4,389	48.8
Democratic	Brian Sear (Incumbent)	3,791	42.1
Independent Party	Doug Dubitsky	438	4.9
Working Families	Brian Sear (Incumbent)	381	4.2
Total votes		8,999	100.00
Republican gain from Democratic			

=== 2012 ===
2012 Connecticut House of Representatives election, District 47
Party	Candidate	Votes	%
Democratic	Brian Sear (Incumbent)	6,030	55.6
Republican	Noah P. Enslow	4,815	44.4
Total votes		10,845	100.00
Democratic hold			
