= Ben McGorty =

American politician

Member of the Connecticut House of Representatives from the 122nd district
- Incumbent
- Assumed office July 25, 2014
- Preceded by: Lawrence G. Miller
- Succeeded by: Mandy Kilmartin (elect)

Personal details
- Born: May 2, 1964 (age 62)
- Party: Republican
- Education: Housatonic Community College (AS)

Ben McGorty (born May 2, 1964) is an American politician from the state of Connecticut. A Republican, he has been a member of the Connecticut House of Representatives since 2014, elected from the 122nd district.

McGorty is a Lieutenant/Deputy Fire Marshal for the town of Stratford, and a real estate agent. He was first elected to the state House in a July 22, 2014 special election, defeating Democratic nominee Arlene Liscinsky in a low-turnout race to fill the vacancy left by the death of state Representative Lawrence G. "Larry" Miller, who held the seat from 1991 until his death on May 31, 2014. In the November 2014 general election, McGorty faced no Democratic opponent, with only an unaffiliated petitioning candidate running against him. McGorty was reelected in 2016, when he did not have any Democratic opponent. (McGorty received about 80% of the vote against Green Party candidate Angela Capinera, who won 20% of the vote. McGorty was reelected in 2018 (defeating Democratic challenger Jose Goncalves by about 61% to 39%), and 2020 (again defeating Goncalves, by about 59% to 41%). The 122nd district has an irregular shape: it includes most of Shelton; Oronoque Village and other portions of Stratford north of the Merritt Parkway, and a small part of Trumbull on the town's eastern side.

McGorty embraced Donald Trump in 2016, saying that he was "100 percent" behind Trump's presidential candidacy.

McGorty lives in Shelton. He is a member of the Knights of Columbus. His wife, Noreen, is a Shelton alderman, elected from the Fourth Ward, corresponding to the Huntington neighborhood.
