= Tammy Nuccio =

American politician from Connecticut

Member of the Connecticut House of Representatives from the 53rd district
- Incumbent
- Assumed office January 6, 2021
- Preceded by: Patricia Wilson Pheanious

Personal details
- Born: 1971 (age 54–55)
- Party: Republican
- Education: Manchester Community College (AS); Bay Path University (BBA, MBA)

Tammy Nuccio (born 1971) is an American politician currently serving as a Connecticut State Representative from the 53rd District, which encompasses the towns of Tolland, and Willington as well as part of Vernon. A member of the Republican Party, Nuccio was first elected to the seat in 2020 after defeating Democratic Incumbent Pat Wilson Pheanious.

== Political career ==
In January 2021, Nuccio proposed an amendment to the state constitution that would prevent revenue collected from transportation-related taxes from being diverted to other programs, citing the fact that the Connecticut state transportation fund is set to be depleted by 2024. She serves as Ranking Member of the Appropriations Committee, and also sits on the Insurance and Real Estate Committee, Executive Nominations and the Special Education Committee.
