= MJ Shannon =

American politician

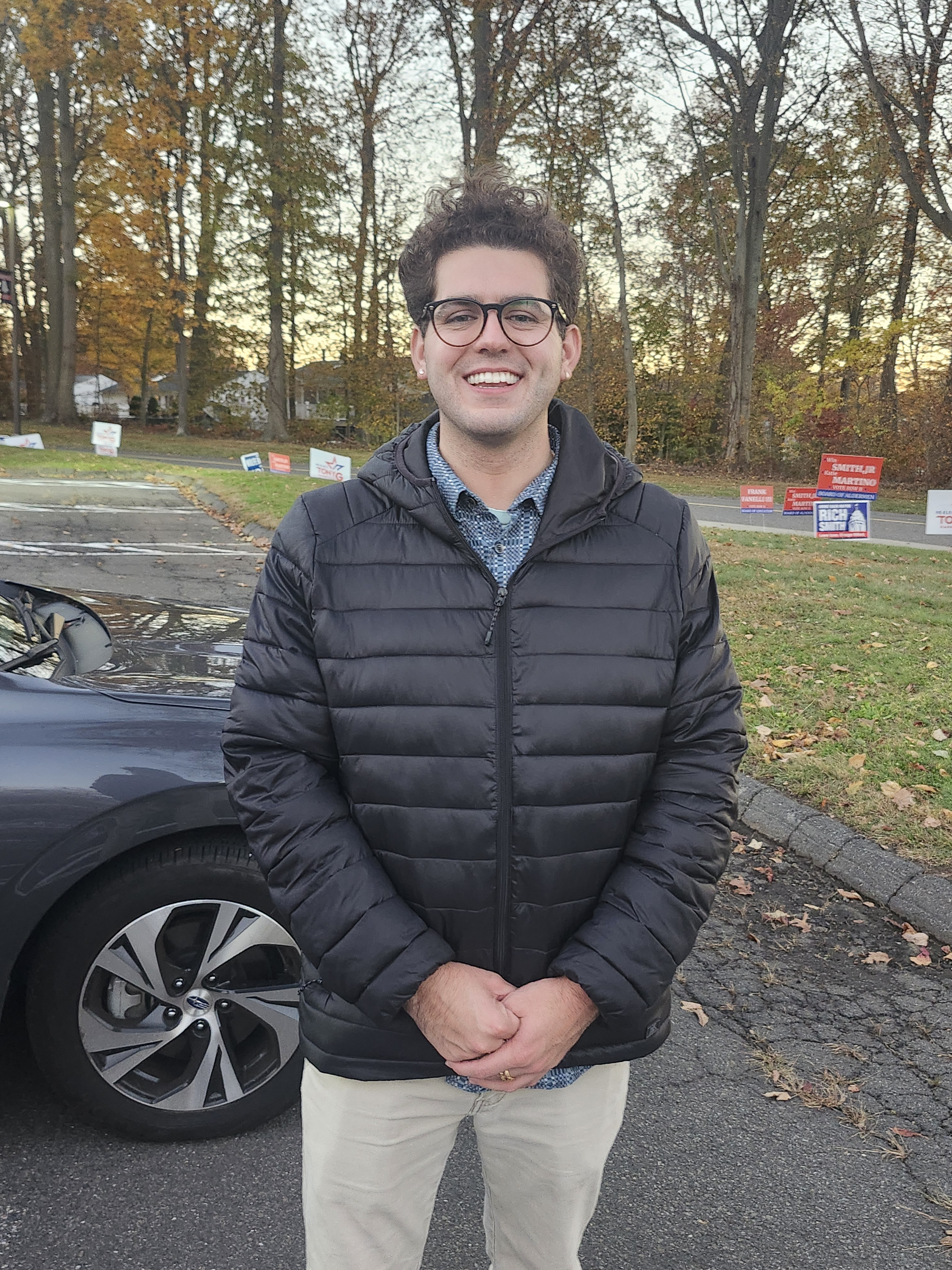
- Shannon in 2025

Member of the Connecticut House of Representatives from the 117th district
- Incumbent
- Assumed office January 8, 2025
- Preceded by: Charles Ferraro

Personal details
- Born: June 29, 2000 (age 26) Milford, Connecticut, U.S.
- Party: Democratic
- Education: Plymouth State University (B.A.)

Michael "MJ" Shannon (born June 29, 2000) is an American politician and member of the Connecticut House of Representatives since 2025 from the 117th district, which contains parts of Milford, Orange, and West Haven. Shannon graduated from Plymouth State University. He is openly gay.
