= Patricia Wilson Pheanious =

American politician (born 1950)

Member of the Connecticut House of Representatives from the 53rd district
- In office January 9, 2019 – January 6, 2021
- Preceded by: Sam Belsito
- Succeeded by: Tammy Nuccio

Personal details
- Born: August 26, 1950 (age 75)
- Party: Democratic

Patricia Wilson Pheanious (born August 26, 1950) is an American politician who was the member of the Connecticut House of Representatives from the 53rd district in Windham County.

== Political career ==
=== Election ===
Pheanious was elected in the general election on November 6, 2018, winning 52 percent of the vote over 48 percent of Republican candidate Sam Belsito.
