= Mandy Kilmartin =

American politician

Member-elect of the Connecticut House of Representatives from the 122nd district
- Assuming office January 2027
- Succeeding: Ben McGorty

Personal details
- Party: Democratic
- Website: Campaign website

Mandy Kilmartin is an American politician. A member of the Democratic Party, she is the member-elect for the 122nd district of the Connecticut House of Representatives. She was elected at the 2026 election. Kilmartin works in healthcare.
