= Joe de la Cruz =

American businessman, sheetmetal worker, and politician

Member of the Connecticut House of Representatives from the 41st district
- In office 2017–2023
- Preceded by: Aundre Bumgardner
- Succeeded by: Aundre Bumgardner

Personal details
- Born: Groton, Connecticut, U.S.
- Party: Democratic

Joe de la Cruz is an American businessman, sheetmetal worker, and politician who served as a member of the Connecticut House of Representatives from the 41st district. He assumed office in 2017.

== Early life and education ==
De la Cruz was born in Groton, Connecticut. He completed an apprenticeship through the CT Sheet Metal Workers program.

== Career ==
De la Cruz began his career as a sheetmetal worker and has since worked as a general manager. He served as a member of the Groton City Council from 2014 to 2016 and was also a member of the Groton Town Meeting. He was elected to the Connecticut House of Representatives in 2016 and assumed office in 2017. During his first legislative session, de la Cruz served as vice chair of the House Insurance and Real Estate Committee. De la Cruz did not seek reelection in 2023 citing his dissatisfaction with the salary offered to state representatives.
