= Phyllis Kipp =

American politician (died 1984)

Member of the Connecticut House of Representatives from the 41st district
- In office 1973–1981
- Preceded by: Morris N. Cohen
- Succeeded by: Muriel Buckley

Personal details
- Born: 1927 or 1928
- Died: December 23, 1984 (aged 56) Norwich, Connecticut, U.S.
- Party: Republican
- Spouse: Paul B. Kipp

Phyllis Taber Kipp (died December 23, 1984) was an American politician who served in the Connecticut House of Representatives from 1973 to 1981, representing the 41st district as a Republican.
