= Ina Vestal =

American politician (1903–1983)

Member of the Connecticut House of Representatives from the 117th district
- In office 1967–1969
- Preceded by: Seat established
- Succeeded by: John D. McHugh

Member of the Connecticut House of Representatives from Woodbridge
- In office 1955–1967 Serving with George H. Eaton (1961–1967)
- Preceded by: Chester C. Hitchcock
- Succeeded by: Seat eliminated

Personal details
- Born: Ina Featherson; July 3, 1903 Au Sable Forks, New York, U.S.
- Died: October 12, 1983 (aged 80) Madison, Connecticut, U.S.
- Party: Republican
- Spouse(s): Paul William Vestal (died 1965) Donald C. Hayden
- Children: 2

Ina Vestal Hayden (July 3, 1903 – October 12, 1983) was an American politician who served in the Connecticut House of Representatives from 1955 to 1969. A Republican, she represented the town of Woodbridge from 1955 to 1967, and the 117th district from 1967 to 1969.

== Personal life ==
Ina Featherson was born on July 3, 1903, in Au Sable Forks, New York. She attended the Gardner School for Girls in New York City. In 1932, she moved to Woodbridge, Connecticut, where she lived until 1977. She had two sons with her first husband, surgeon Paul William Vestal, who died in 1965 at age 80. She later married Donald C. Hayden, and they remained together until her death in 1983.

== Political career ==
A Republican, Vestal was first elected to the Connecticut House of Representatives in 1954, and she represented the town of Woodbridge until 1967. Vestal served alone from 1955 to 1961, and alongside George H. Eaton from 1961 to 1967, as 1960 was the first election cycle in which Woodbridge qualified to elect two representatives.

In 1966, Connecticut redistricted, eliminating its single-town districts, and Vestal was elected to the newly created 117th district, where she served one term. She did not run for reelection in 1968 and was succeeded by John D. McHugh in 1969.

== Death ==
Vestal died on October 12, 1983, in Madison, Connecticut. She was 80.
