= Astrid Hanzalek =

American politician (1928–2019)

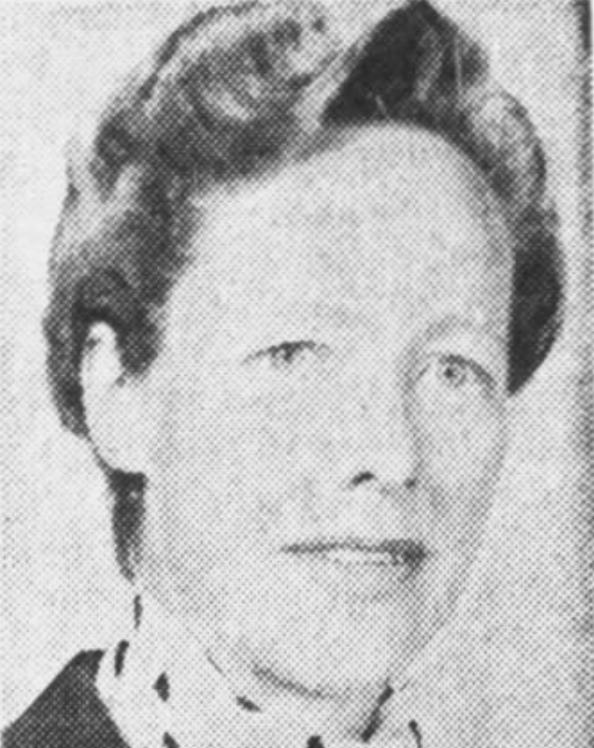

Member of the Connecticut House of Representatives from the 61st district
- In office January 3, 1973 – January 7, 1981
- Preceded by: Leo H. Flynn
- Succeeded by: Ruth Fahrbach

Member of the Connecticut House of Representatives from the 40th district
- In office January 6, 1971 – January 3, 1973
- Preceded by: James H. McGill
- Succeeded by: William S. Mayer

Personal details
- Born: Astrid Teicher; January 6, 1928 New York City, New York, U.S.
- Died: September 1, 2019 (aged 91) Suffield, Connecticut, U.S.
- Party: Republican

Astrid Teicher Hanzalek (January 6, 1928 – September 1, 2019) was an American politician who served in the Connecticut House of Representatives from 1971 to 1981.

== Early life and education ==
Astrid Teicher was born in New York City, the daughter of German immigrants Arthur Teicher and Luise Gertrud Funke Teicher. Her father had a sheet metal business, and her mother was a professional chef, trained in France. She finished high school in three years, and graduated from Concordia College in 1947. She earned a bachelor's degree in chemistry from the University of Pennsylvania in 1949.

== Career ==
Hanzalek was an organist and choir director at a Lutheran church on Long Island after college. She worked in advertising in New York as a young woman. She served in the Connecticut House of Representatives from 1971 to 1981. In 1978, she was considered a possible candidate for lieutenant governor. She was a delegate to the Republican National Convention in 1980, and at Republican State Conventions in 1974 and 1978. She served on the Connecticut State Commission on Culture and Tourism, the Connecticut Council on Environmental Quality, and the Connecticut Greenway Commission. She served on the boards of the Connecticut Forest and Park Association and of Riverfront Recapture.

Hanzalek was co-founder of the Suffield Land Trust, president of the Antiquarian and Landmark Society, and an active member of the American Red Cross, Traveler's Aid, and Greater Hartford Community Council. In 2010 she received an honorary degree from Charter Oak State College.

== Personal life ==
Teicher married mechanical engineer Frederick Hanzalek in 1955. She played tennis and golf as an avid amateur competitor. Her husband died in 2017, and she died of a stroke on September 1, 2019, in Suffield, Connecticut, at age 91.
