= Brian Sear =

American politician

Member of the Connecticut House of Representatives from the 47th district
- In office January 9, 2013 – January 7, 2015
- Preceded by: Christopher Coutu
- Succeeded by: Doug Dubitsky

Personal details
- Born: January 28, 1955 (age 71)
- Party: Democratic

Brian Sear (born January 28, 1955) is an American politician who served in the Connecticut House of Representatives from the 47th district from 2013 to 2015.
