= 2014 Connecticut Senate election =

2014 Connecticut Senate elections
- November 4, 2014

All 36 seats in the Connecticut State Senate 19 seats needed for a majority
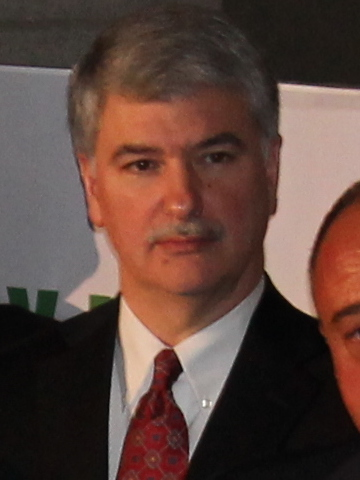

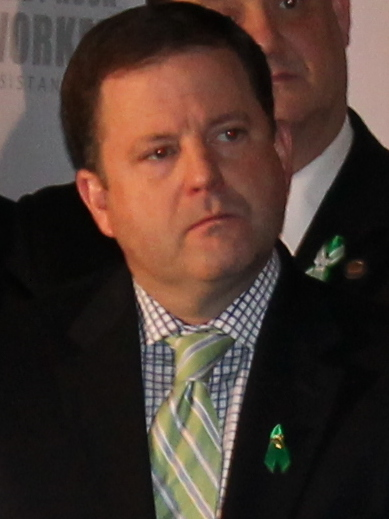
	Majority party	Minority party
Leader	Donald Williams	John McKinney (retired)
Party	Democratic	Republican
Leader since	July 1, 2004	June 2007
Leader's seat	29th	28th
Last election	22	14
Seats won	21	15
Seat change	▼1	▲1
- Results: Republican gain Democratic hold Republican hold
President pro tempore of the Senate before election
Donald Williams
Democratic
Elected President pro tempore of the Senate
Donald Williams
Democratic

The 2014 Connecticut Senate election was held on November 4, 2014, concurrently with the elections for the Connecticut House of Representatives, to elect members to the Connecticut General Assembly. All 36 seats in the Connecticut Senate were up for election. Republicans gained one seat from the Democrats.

== Predictions ==
Source	Ranking	As of
Governing	Safe D	October 20, 2014
