= Connecticut's 53rd House of Representatives district =

American legislative district

Connecticut's 53rd State House of Representatives district
Representative
Tammy Nuccio; R

Connecticut's 53rd House of Representatives district elects one member of the Connecticut House of Representatives. It consists of the towns of Ashford, Willington, and parts of Tolland. It has been represented by Republican Tammy Nuccio since 2021.

== List of representatives ==
List of Representatives from Connecticut's 53rd House District
Representative	Party	Years	District home	Note
John E. Blake	Democratic	1967–1973	Windham	Seat created
Jesse A. Brainard	Republican	1973–1975	Coventry	
Robert M. Walsh	Democratic	1975–1981	Coventry	
Michael Helfgott	Democratic	1981–1987	West Willington	
Nancy Wyman	Democratic	1987–1995	Tolland	
Michael J. Cardin	Democratic	1995–2007	Tolland	
Bryan Hurlburt	Democratic	2007–2015	Willington	
Sam Belsito	Republican	2015–2019	Tolland	
Patricia Wilson Pheanious	Democratic	2019–2021	Ashford	
Tammy Nuccio	Republican	2021–	Tolland	

== Recent elections ==
=== 2020 ===
2020 Connecticut State House of Representatives election, District 53
Party	Candidate	Votes	%
Republican	Tammy Nuccio	6,768	48.82
Democratic	Pat Wilson Pheanious (incumbent)	6,396	46.14
Independent Party	Tammy Nuccio	400	2.89
Working Families	Pat Wilson Pheanious (incumbent)	299	2.16
Total votes		13,863	100.00
Republican gain from Democratic			

=== 2018 ===
2018 Connecticut House of Representatives election, District 53
Party	Candidate	Votes	%
Democratic	Patricia Wilson Pheanious	5,876	52.3
Republican	Sam Belsito (Incumbent)	5,369	47.7
Total votes		11,245	100.00
Democratic gain from Republican			

=== 2016 ===
2016 Connecticut House of Representatives election, District 53
Party	Candidate	Votes	%
Republican	Sam Belsito (Incumbent)	6,385	50.19
Democratic	Susan Eastwood	6,337	49.81
Total votes		12,722	100.00
Republican hold			

=== 2014 ===
2014 Connecticut House of Representatives election, District 53
Party	Candidate	Votes	%
Republican	Sam Belsito (Incumbent)	4,647	51.00
Democratic	Rick Field	4,088	44.00
Independent Party	Sam Belsito (Incumbent)	384	4.2
Total votes		9,119	100.00
Republican hold			

=== 2013 special ===
2013 Connecticut House of Representatives District 53 Special election
Party	Candidate	Votes	%
Republican	Sam Belsito	1,910	58.5
Democratic	Anthony J. Horn	1,356	41.5
Total votes		3,266	100.00
Republican hold			
