= Connecticut's 61st House of Representatives district =

American legislative district

Connecticut's 61st State House of Representatives district
Representative
Tami Zawistowski; R

Connecticut's 61st House of Representatives district elects one member of the Connecticut House of Representatives. Its current representative is a Republican Tami Zawistowski. She won a special election in the spring of 2014 to replace Democrat Elaine O'Brien who died while in office. The district consists of the entire towns of Suffield and East Granby, along with part of Windsor north of the Farmington River.

== List of representatives ==
List of Representatives from Connecticut's 61st State House District
Representative	Party	Years	District home	Note
James Albert Gaffney	Democratic	1967–1969	Taftville	Seat created
Leo H. Flynn	Democratic	1969–1973	Taftville	
Astrid Hanzalek	Republican	1973–1981	Suffield	
Ruth Fahrbach	Republican	1981–2009	Windsor	Did not seek reelection
Matthew Conway Jr.	Democratic	2009 – 2011	Suffield	Did not seek reelection
Elaine O'Brien	Democratic	2011 – 2014	Suffield	Died in office
Tami Zawistowski	Republican	2014 – present	East Granby	Incumbent; won special election to replace O'Brien

== Recent elections ==
State Election 2008: House District 61
Party	Candidate	Votes	%	±%
Republican	Lauren K. Life	5,629	47.2	−4.2
Democratic	Matthew J. Conway, Jr.	5,556	46.6	+0.0
Working Families	Matthew J. Conway, Jr.	749	6.3	+4.2
Majority		676	5.7	+2.9
Turnout		11,934		
Democratic gain from Republican		Swing	+4.2	

State Election 2006: House District 61
Party	Candidate	Votes	%	±%
Republican	Ruth Fahrbach	4,273	51.4	−40.0
Democratic	Derek E. Donnelly	3,872	46.6	+46.6
Working Families	Derek E. Donnelly	172	2.1	−6.5
Majority		229	2.8	−80.1
Turnout		8,317		
Republican hold		Swing	-43.3	

State Election 2004: House District 61
Party	Candidate	Votes	%	±%
Republican	Ruth Fahrbach	6,660	91.4	−2.4
Working Families	James J. Carone, Sr.	624	8.6	+2.4
Majority		6,038	82.9	−4.7
Turnout		7,284		
Republican hold		Swing	-2.4	

State Election 2002: House District 61
Party	Candidate	Votes	%	±%
Republican	Ruth Fahrbach	4,853	93.8	−6.0
Working Families	James J. Carrone, Sr.	321	6.2	+6.2
Majority		4,532	87.6	−12.1
Turnout		5,174		
Republican hold		Swing	-6.1	
