= Elissa Wright =

American politician (born 1946)

Member of the Connecticut House of Representatives from the 41st district
- In office January 3, 2007 – January 7, 2015
- Preceded by: Lenny Winkler
- Succeeded by: Aundre Bumgardner

Personal details
- Born: April 14, 1946 (age 80) Hartford, Connecticut, U.S.
- Party: Democratic

Elissa Wright (born April 14, 1946) is an American politician who served in the Connecticut House of Representatives from the 41st district from 2007 to 2015.
