= Lawrence G. Miller =

American politician (1936–2014)

Member of the Connecticut House of Representatives from the 122nd district
- In office 1991 – June 1, 2014
- Preceded by: Robert G. Jaekle
- Succeeded by: Ben McGorty

Personal details
- Born: April 19, 1936 Bridgeport, Connecticut, U.S.
- Died: June 1, 2014 (aged 78)
- Party: Republican
- Education: University of Bridgeport
- Profession: Politician, businessman

Lawrence G. Miller (April 19, 1936 – June 1, 2014) was an American politician and businessman who served in the Connecticut House of Representatives, representing the 122nd district from 1991 to his death in office in 2014.

== Personal life ==
Miller was born in Bridgeport, Connecticut, in 1936, and received his bachelor's degree in business administration from the University of Bridgeport. He was the president of Milo Oil.

In 1998, Miller was diagnosed with multiple myeloma, a form of blood cancer, and told he had three to five years to live. However, after undergoing two autologous stem cell transplants in Arkansas, Miller's cancer went into remission. The experience influenced his support for the use of stem cells in medicine, including embryonic stem cells, a position he described as at odds with the teachings of his Roman Catholic faith. In 2005, endorsing a 10-year spending commitment for stem-cell research in the Connecticut General Assembly, Miller said, "I'm a Roman Catholic, brought up in a parochial environment and all for years. […] So it's not like I'm taking a shot at the Church, but I think they're wrong. There's a mistake being committed here by the Church."

Miller died of brain cancer on June 1, 2014.

== Political career ==
Miller was a Republican. From 1977 to 1985, he served on the Stratford Town Council.

In 1990, Miller was elected to the Connecticut House of Representatives from the 122nd district, which includes parts of Shelton, Stratford, and Trumbull. He was reelected twelve times, serving until his death in office in 2014.

Throughout his career, Miller was a proponent of stem-cell research and therapy, a position he credited to his own experience undergoing stem-cell transplants to treat his multiple myeloma. In 2004, he said, "When you go through something like this, you see all the different diseases that might be cured by further stem-cell research, and I'm intent on trying to make that a reality in Connecticut at places like Yale University."

In May 2014, the Connecticut House of Representatives unanimously passed a resolution declaring that Gustave Whitehead, an aviation pioneer from Bridgeport, Connecticut, was the first to fly. The resolution was introduced by Lawrence F. Cafero on behalf of Miller, who was absent due to illness.
