= Connecticut's 18th State Senate district =

American legislative district

Senator
Heather Somers; R

Connecticut's 18th State Senate district elects one member of the Connecticut State Senate. It consists of the towns of Griswold, Groton, Sterling, Voluntown, Stonington, North Stonington, Plainfield, and Preston. It is currently represented by Republican Heather Somers, who has been serving since 2017.

== Recent elections ==
=== 2024 ===
2024 Connecticut State Senate election, District 18
Party	Candidate	Votes	%
Republican	Heather Somers (incumbent)	29,124	59.0
Democratic	Andrew Parrella	20,217	41.0
Total votes		49,341	100.00
Republican hold			

=== 2022 ===
2022 Connecticut State Senate election, District 18
Party	Candidate	Votes	%
Republican	Heather Somers (incumbent)	20,915	56.3
Democratic	Farouk Rajab	16,249	43.7
Total votes		37,164	100.00
Republican hold			

=== 2020 ===
2020 Connecticut State Senate election, District 18
Party	Candidate	Votes	%
Democratic	Bob Statchen	23,942	47.60
Republican	Heather Somers (incumbent)	26,377	52.42
Independent Party	Bob Statchen	883	1.75
Working Families	Bob Statchen	677	1.35
Total votes		50,319	100.00
Republican hold			

=== 2018 ===
2018 Connecticut State Senate election, District 18
Party	Candidate	Votes	%
Total	Heather Somers (incumbent)	20,887	54.7
Republican	Heather Somers	19,584	51.3
Independent	Heather Somers	1,303	3.4
Total	Robert Statchen	17,276	45.3
Democratic	Robert Statchen	16,502	43.2
Working Families	Robert Statchen	774	2.0
Total votes		38,163	100.0
Republican hold			

=== 2016 ===
2016 Connecticut State Senate election, District 18
Party	Candidate	Votes	%
Democratic	Timothy Bowles	18,447	42.66
Republican	Heather Somers (incumbent)	24,795	57.34
Total votes		43,242	100.00
Republican gain from Democratic			

=== 2014 ===
2014 Connecticut State Senate election, District 18
Party	Candidate	Votes	%
Democratic	Andrew M. Maynard (incumbent)	16,790	58.60
Republican	Kevin G. Trejo	11,873	41.40
Total votes		28,663	100.00
Democratic hold			

=== 2012 ===
2012 Connecticut State Senate election, District 18
Party	Candidate	Votes	%
Democratic	Andrew M. Maynard (incumbent)	23,380	60.8
Republican	Theresa Madonna	15,053	39.20
Total votes		38,433	100.00
Democratic hold			
