= Oronoque, Connecticut =

Census-designated place in Connecticut, United States

- Census-designated place
- Location within Connecticut Location within the United States
- Coordinates: 41°15′9″N 73°6′14″W
- Country: United States
- State: Connecticut
- County: Fairfield
- Town: Stratford

Area
  - Total: 2.31 sq mi (5.98 km^{2})
  - Land: 2.25 sq mi (5.84 km^{2})
  - Water: 0.054 sq mi (0.14 km^{2})
- Elevation: 190 ft (58 m)
- Time zone: UTC-5 (Eastern (EST))
  - Summer (DST): UTC-4 (EDT)
- ZIP Code: 06614 (Stratford)
- Area codes: 203/475
- FIPS code: 09-57880
- GNIS feature ID: 2805068

Oronoque is a census-designated place (CDP) in the town of Stratford, Fairfield County, Connecticut, United States. It is in the northern part of the town, bordered to the north by the city of Shelton, to the east by the Housatonic River, and to the south by the Merritt Parkway. Connecticut Route 110 (Main Street) runs north–south through the community. The administrative offices of Sikorsky Aircraft are in the eastern part of the CDP, between Route 110 and the Housatonic River.

As of the 2020 census, Oronoque had a population of 3,790.

Oronoque was first listed as a CDP prior to the 2020 census.

== Demographics ==
=== 2020 census ===
As of the 2020 census, Oronoque had a population of 3,790. The median age was 63.8 years. 8.1% of residents were under the age of 18 and 48.0% of residents were 65 years of age or older. For every 100 females there were 75.1 males, and for every 100 females age 18 and over there were 73.7 males age 18 and over.

100.0% of residents lived in urban areas, while 0.0% lived in rural areas.

There were 1,860 households in Oronoque, of which 9.8% had children under the age of 18 living in them. Of all households, 40.9% were married-couple households, 13.7% were households with a male householder and no spouse or partner present, and 39.9% were households with a female householder and no spouse or partner present. About 40.3% of all households were made up of individuals and 30.2% had someone living alone who was 65 years of age or older.

There were 2,025 housing units, of which 8.1% were vacant. The homeowner vacancy rate was 1.3% and the rental vacancy rate was 17.9%.

Racial composition as of the 2020 census
Race	Number	Percent
White	3,123	82.4%
Black or African American	275	7.3%
American Indian and Alaska Native	8	0.2%
Asian	62	1.6%
Native Hawaiian and Other Pacific Islander	0	0.0%
Some other race	82	2.2%
Two or more races	240	6.3%
Hispanic or Latino (of any race)	298	7.9%
