= Bryan Hurlburt =

American politician

Connecticut Commissioner of Agriculture
- Incumbent
- Assumed office March 29, 2019
- Governor: Ned Lamont
- Preceded by: Steven Reviczky

Member of the Connecticut House of Representatives from the 53rd district
- In office January 3, 2007 – April 19, 2013
- Preceded by: Michael Cardin
- Succeeded by: Sam Belsito

Personal details
- Born: June 9, 1979 (age 47) Tolland, Connecticut
- Party: Democratic

Bryan Hurlburt (born June 9, 1979) is an American politician who has served as the Connecticut Commissioner of Agriculture since 2019. He previously served in the Connecticut House of Representatives from the 53rd district from 2007 to 2013.
