= Tami Zawistowski =

American politician (born 1956)

Member of the Connecticut House of Representatives from the 61st district
- Incumbent
- Assumed office 2014
- Preceded by: Elaine O'Brien

Personal details
- Born: 1956 (age 69–70)
- Party: Republican
- Children: 3
- Education: University of Connecticut (BA)

Tami Zawistowski (born 1956) is an American politician from the state of Connecticut. She is a member of the Republican Party representing the 61st district. On April 11, 2014, she won a special election to the Connecticut House of Representatives, succeeding Elaine O'Brien, who died in office.
