= Elaine O'Brien =

American flight instructor and politician (1955–2014)

Member of the Connecticut House of Representatives from the 61st district
- In office January 2011 – February 21, 2014
- Preceded by: Matthew Conway, Jr.
- Succeeded by: Tami Zawistowski

Personal details
- Born: August 1, 1955 Medford, Massachusetts, U.S.
- Died: February 21, 2014 (aged 58) West Hartford, Connecticut, U.S.
- Party: Democratic Party
- Children: 3
- Education: Pennsylvania State University (bachelors); Westfield State University (masters)
- Occupation: flight instructor

Elaine Catherine Corrigan O'Brien Donnelly (August 1, 1955 – February 21, 2014) was an American flight instructor and politician.

Born in Medford, Massachusetts, O'Brien received her bachelor's degree from Pennsylvania State University and her masters from Westfield State University, She had multiple careers, including in aviation as a pilot and flight instructor, and in state and local government. She served on the local board of education and as town clerk. She then served in the Connecticut House of Representatives, from Suffield, Connecticut, as a Democrat from 2010 until her death in 2014.

She died in West Hartford, Connecticut from glioblastoma at age 58.
