= Charles Ferraro =

American politician

Member of the Connecticut House of Representatives from the 117th district
- In office January 7, 2015 – January 8, 2025
- Preceded by: Paul Davis
- Succeeded by: MJ Shannon

Personal details
- Born: November 6, 1952 (age 73)
- Party: Republican
- Education: Southern Connecticut State University (BS)

Charles Ferraro (born November 6, 1952) is an American politician who served in the Connecticut House of Representatives from the 117th district from 2015 to 2025. He also serves as Grandmaster of the Tang Soo Do Mi Guk Kwan federation.
