= Ruth Fahrbach =

American politician (born 1942)

Member of the Connecticut House of Representatives from the 61st district
- In office January 7, 1981 – January 7, 2009
- Preceded by: Astrid Hanzalek
- Succeeded by: Matthew J. Conway Jr.

Personal details
- Born: November 25, 1942 (age 83) New York City, New York, U.S.
- Party: Republican

Ruth Fahrbach (born November 25, 1942) is an American politician who served in the Connecticut House of Representatives from the 61st district from 1981 to 2009.
