= Connecticut's 41st House of Representatives district =

American legislative district

Connecticut's 41st State House of Representatives district
Representative
Aundre Bumgardner; D

Connecticut's 41st House of Representatives district elects one member of the Connecticut House of Representatives. It encompasses parts of Groton and New London. It has been represented by Democrat Aundre Bumgardner since 2023.

== List of representatives ==
List of Representatives from Connecticut's 41st State House District
Representative	Party	Years	District home	Note
Morris N. Cohen	Democratic	1967–1973	Bloomfield	Seat created
Phyllis Kipp	Republican	1973–1981	Mystic	
Muriel Buckley	Republican	1981–1988	Groton	Died in office
Lenny Winkler	Republican	1988–2007	Groton	Elected in March 1988 special election
Elissa Wright	Democratic	2007–2015	Groton	
Aundre Bumgardner	Republican	2015–2017	Groton	
Joe de la Cruz	Democratic	2017–2023	Groton	
Aundre Bumgardner	Democratic	2023–	Groton	

== Recent elections ==
=== 2020 ===
2020 Connecticut State House of Representatives election, District 41
Party	Candidate	Votes	%
Democratic	Joe de la Cruz (incumbent)	7,983	91.30
Working Families	Joe de la Cruz (incumbent)	761	8.70
Total votes		8,744	100.00
Democratic hold			

=== 2018 ===
2018 Connecticut House of Representatives election, District 41
Party	Candidate	Votes	%
Democratic	Joe de la Cruz (Incumbent)	5,828	65.2
Republican	Kenneth Richards	3,106	34.8
Total votes		8,934	100.00
Democratic hold			

=== 2016 ===
2016 Connecticut House of Representatives election, District 41
Party	Candidate	Votes	%
Democratic	Joe de la Cruz	5,636	54.81
Republican	Aundre Bumgardner (Incumbent)	4,646	45.19
Total votes		10,282	100.00
Democratic gain from Republican			

=== 2014 ===
2014 Connecticut House of Representatives election, District 41
Party	Candidate	Votes	%
Republican	Aundre Bumgardner	3,289	45.7
Democratic	Elissa Wright (Incumbent)	3,581	49.7
Independent Party	Aundre Bumgardner (Incumbent)	331	4.6
Total votes		7,201	100.00
Republican gain from Democratic			

=== 2012 ===
2012 Connecticut House of Representatives election, District 41
Party	Candidate	Votes	%
Democratic	Elissa Wright (Incumbent)	4,951	53.0
Republican	Harry A. Watson	4,388	47.0
Total votes		9,339	100.00
Democratic hold			
