= Sam Belsito =

American politician

Member of the Connecticut House of Representatives from the 53rd district
- In office June 19, 2013 – January 9, 2019
- Preceded by: Bryan Hurlburt
- Succeeded by: Patricia Wilson Pheanious

Personal details
- Born: July 16, 1942 (age 84) Worcester, Massachusetts, U.S.
- Party: Republican

Sam Belsito (born July 16, 1942) is an American politician who served in the Connecticut House of Representatives from the 53rd district from 2013 to 2019.
