= Philipp Fahrbach Sr. =

Austrian musician

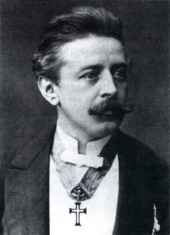

Philipp Fahrbach Sr. (25 October 1815 – 31 March 1885) was an Austrian musician. He was in the orchestra of Johann Strauss I in Vienna, and later led his own ensemble which followed the tradition of the Strauss orchestra; he composed dance music and marches. He was also director of a military band.

== Life ==
Fahrbach was born in 1815 in Vienna, son of Georg Leonhardt Fahrbach and his wife Karoline née Koberger. His brothers Joseph (1804–1883) and Friedrich (1809–1867) were musicians, and they gave Philipp early musical training. Aged about 14, he joined the orchestra of Johann Strauss I, playing flute; Strauss sometimes consulted him about the instrumentation of his works.

In 1835, he formed his own orchestra. In 1838, when Johann Strauss I was away from Vienna during Fasching, Fahrbach's orchestra benefited from his absence and became popular. From that year, his orchestra often played at royal court balls. From 1841 to 1846, he was conductor with an infantry regiment; on leaving, he formed again his own ensemble. From 1852, after the death of the elder Johann Strauss, his orchestra alternated with the Strauss orchestra at court balls.

In 1856, he returned to conducting the band of an infantry regiment, leaving in 1865. He then formed an ensemble, which became the resident orchestra at Café Sperl. Fahrbach died in Vienna in 1885.

His son Philipp Fahrbach Jr. (1843–1894) was a musician; he conducted his father's orchestra, and was a military bandmaster. He composed popular dance music and marches.

== Writings and compositions ==
In the 1840s, Fahrbach contributed regularly to the Allgemeine Wiener Musik-Zeitung; topics included dance music and military music.

He composed about 400 Viennese dances and marches. He wrote two operas: Der Liebe Opfer (1844) and Das Schwert des Königs (1845); also Singspiele and church music.
