= Devin Carney =

American politician (born 1984)

Member of the Connecticut House of Representatives from the 23rd district
- Incumbent
- Assumed office January 7, 2015
- Preceded by: Marilyn Giuliano
- Succeeded by: Jane Wisialowski (elect)

Personal details
- Born: May 10, 1984 (age 42)
- Party: Republican
- Relations: Art Carney (grandfather)
- Education: Brandeis University (BA)

Devin R. Carney (born May 10, 1984) is an American politician who has served in the Connecticut House of Representatives from the 23rd district since 2015. Carney is a Republican.

Carney is the grandson of Academy Award-winning actor Art Carney, and the cousin of actor Reeve Carney.
