= Philipp Fahrbach Jr. =

Austrian conductor and composer (1843-1894)

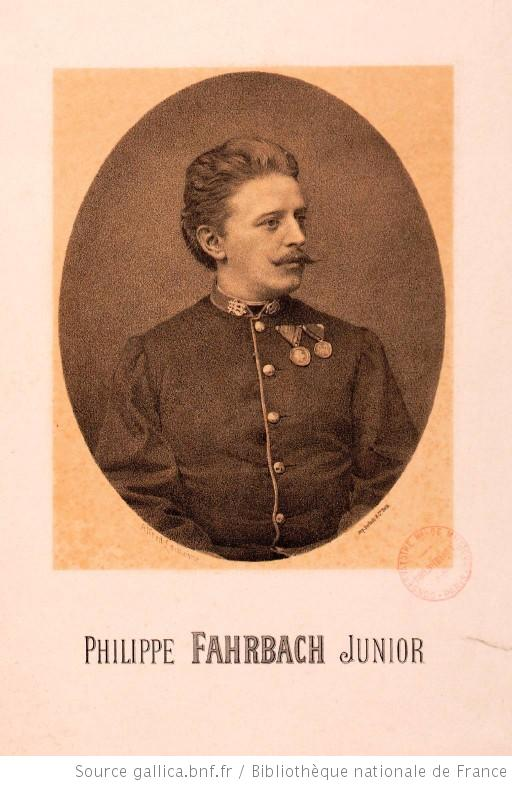

Philipp Fahrbach Jr. (16 December 1843 – 15 February 1894) was an Austrian conductor and composer. He was a military bandmaster, and in his later career a conductor appearing in cities in Europe.

== Life ==
He was born in Vienna. His father Philipp Fahrbach Sr. was a conductor and composer, and his musical training was from his father and later from Jacob Dont. He first appeared aged eleven conducting his father's band; from 1860 he was in the band of the 14th Infantry Regiment, where his father was conductor, continuing until his father left in 1865. From 1870 to 1883 he was conductor of military bands.

In later years he toured Europe as a guest conductor, giving concerts in Paris, Berlin, Madrid, Lisbon and Copenhagen. He appeared at the 1878 World's Fair in Paris, and at the Paris Opéra Balls in the 1880s. He died in Vienna in 1894.

== Writings and compositions ==
He composed more than 500 dances and marches. Most of his works are now found only in editions for piano, or arranged from piano editions. His greatest success was the polka française "Im Kahlenbergerdörfl".
