= Aundre Bumgardner =

American politician

Aundré Bumgardner
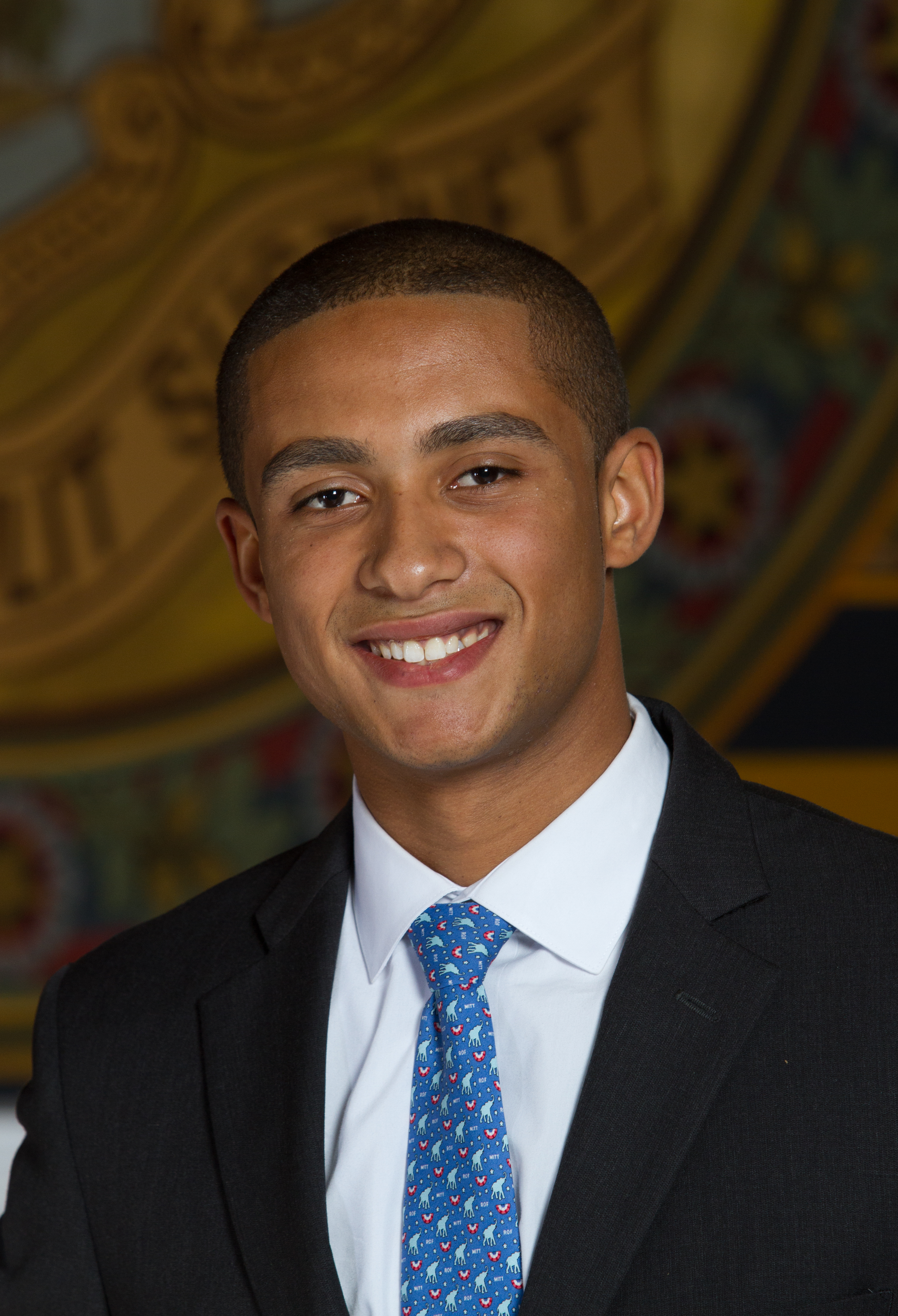

Member of the Connecticut House of Representatives from the 41st district
- In office January 2023 – Present
- Preceded by: Joe de la Cruz
- In office January 2015 – January 2017
- Preceded by: Elissa Wright
- Succeeded by: Joe de la Cruz

Personal details
- Born: July 5, 1994 (age 32) New London, Connecticut, U.S.
- Party: Republican (before 2017) Democratic (2017-present)
- Website: ballotpedia.org/Aundre_Bumgardner

Aundré Bumgardner (born July 5, 1994) is an American politician, a Democrat and formerly a member of the Republican party.

== Family and early life ==
His father is African American and his mother is from Puerto Rico.

== Political career ==
=== Connecticut House of Representatives ===
Aundré served as a member of the Connecticut House of Representatives, as a Republican, representing Connecticut's 41st assembly district in the General Assembly. Bumgardner was first elected in 2014 and was defeated in 2016. He was the youngest ever person elected to the House at the age of 20. Aundré was re-elected to the 41st district seat as a Democrat in 2022 defeating Republican Robert Boris in a landslide victory. His predecessor Joe de la Cruz had not sought reelection citing an inability to continue with the job for the salary offered to lawmakers.

On March 2, 2025, Bumgardner was arrested and charged with driving under the influence. He was subsequently suspended from leadership and committee assignments.

=== Groton Town Council ===
In 2018, Bumgardner was appointed to a vacant seat on the Groton Town Council.

In 2019, Bumgardner was re-elected to the Groton Town Council.

On February 15, 2023, Bumgardner resigned from the Groton Town Council due to being elected as State Representative.

=== Party switch ===
In 2018 Bumgardner announced that he was leaving the Republican Party after the Unite the Right Rally in Charlottesville, Virginia. He said that “It wasn’t even so much the words President Trump used, but more so the inaction coming from the Republican Party, not just at the national level, but to a certain extent the state and local level. Silence is absolute complicity.” As of 2018 he was working as the campaign treasurer for the man who unseated him, Rep. Joe de la Cruz, while completing his college education. Bumgardner is a member of the Democratic Town Committee of Groton.
