= Connecticut's 117th House of Representatives district =

American legislative district

Connecticut's 117th State House of Representatives district
Representative
MJ Shannon; D

Connecticut's 117th House of Representatives district elects one member of the Connecticut House of Representatives. It encompasses parts of Milford, Orange, and West Haven. It has been represented by Democrat MJ Shannon since 2025.

== List of representatives ==
List of representatives from Connecticut's 117th State House district
Representative	Party	Years	District home	Note
Ina Vestal	Republican	1967–1969	Woodbridge	Seat created
John D. McHugh	Republican	1969–1973	Orange	Redistricted to the 114th district
William H. Hofmeister	Republican	1973–1975	Milford	
Joseph Bogdan	Democratic	1975–1977	Milford	
William H. Hofmeister	Republican	1977–1985	Milford	
Raymond V. "Ray" Collins	Republican	1985–1987	West Haven	
Arthur C. Gilbert	Democratic	1987–1989	West Haven	
Raymond V. "Ray" Collins	Republican	1989–2005	West Haven	
Paul Davis	Democratic	2005–2015	Orange	
Charles Ferraro	Republican	2015–2025	West Haven	
MJ Shannon	Democratic	2025– present	Milford	

== Recent elections ==
=== 2020 ===
2020 Connecticut State House of Representatives election, District 117
Party	Candidate	Votes	%
Republican	Charles Ferraro (incumbent)	7,353	53.91
Democratic	Tony Sutton	5,884	43.14
Independent Party	Tony Sutton	216	1.58
Working Families	Tony Sutton	187	1.37
Total votes		13,640	100.00
Republican hold			

=== 2018 ===
2018 Connecticut House of Representatives election, District 117
Party	Candidate	Votes	%
Republican	Charles Ferraro (Incumbent)	6,027	55.3
Democratic	Cindy Wolfe Boynton	4,867	44.7
Total votes		10,894	100.00
Republican hold			

=== 2016 ===
2016 Connecticut House of Representatives election, District 117
Party	Candidate	Votes	%
Republican	Charles Ferraro (Incumbent)	6,746	56.58
Democratic	Sean Ronan	5,177	43.42
Total votes		11,923	100.00
Republican hold			

=== 2014 ===
2014 Connecticut House of Representatives election, District 117
Party	Candidate	Votes	%
Republican	Charles Ferraro	3,946	46.9
Democratic	Paul Davis (Incumbent)	4,138	49.2
Independent Party	Charles Ferraro	335	4.0
Total votes		8,419	100.00
Republican hold			

=== 2012 ===
2012 Connecticut House of Representatives election, District 117
Party	Candidate	Votes	%
Democratic	Paul Davis	7,850	100.00
Total votes		7,850	100.00
Republican hold			
