= Doug Dubitsky =

American politician from Connecticut

Member of the Connecticut House of Representatives from the 47th district
- Incumbent
- Assumed office January 7, 2015
- Preceded by: Brian Sear

Personal details
- Born: November 16, 1962 (age 63)
- Party: Republican
- Education: State University of New York at Purchase (BFA); University of Utah (JD)

Doug Dubitsky (born November 16, 1962) is an American politician, attorney, and former stage technician. He has served in the Connecticut House of Representatives from the 47th district since 2015. Dubitsky is a member of the Republican Party.

== Education and career ==
Dubitsky attended the State University of New York at Purchase (SUNY Purchase), where he received a Bachelor of Fine Arts (BFA) degree in Theater Arts and Film. He later became a stage technician and designer in theatre productions. Dubitsky later attended law school at the University of Utah S.J. Quinney College of Law. After graduating in 1999, he became a practicing attorney.

== Connecticut House of Representatives ==
Dubitsky ran for the Connecticut House of Representatives in 2014, winning a three-person Republican primary. As a state legislator, Dubitsky helped lead a lawsuit against restrictions imposed during the COVID-19 pandemic. In 2022, he was elected to a fifth consecutive term in office.
