= Christopher Coutu =

American politician

Christopher D. Coutu
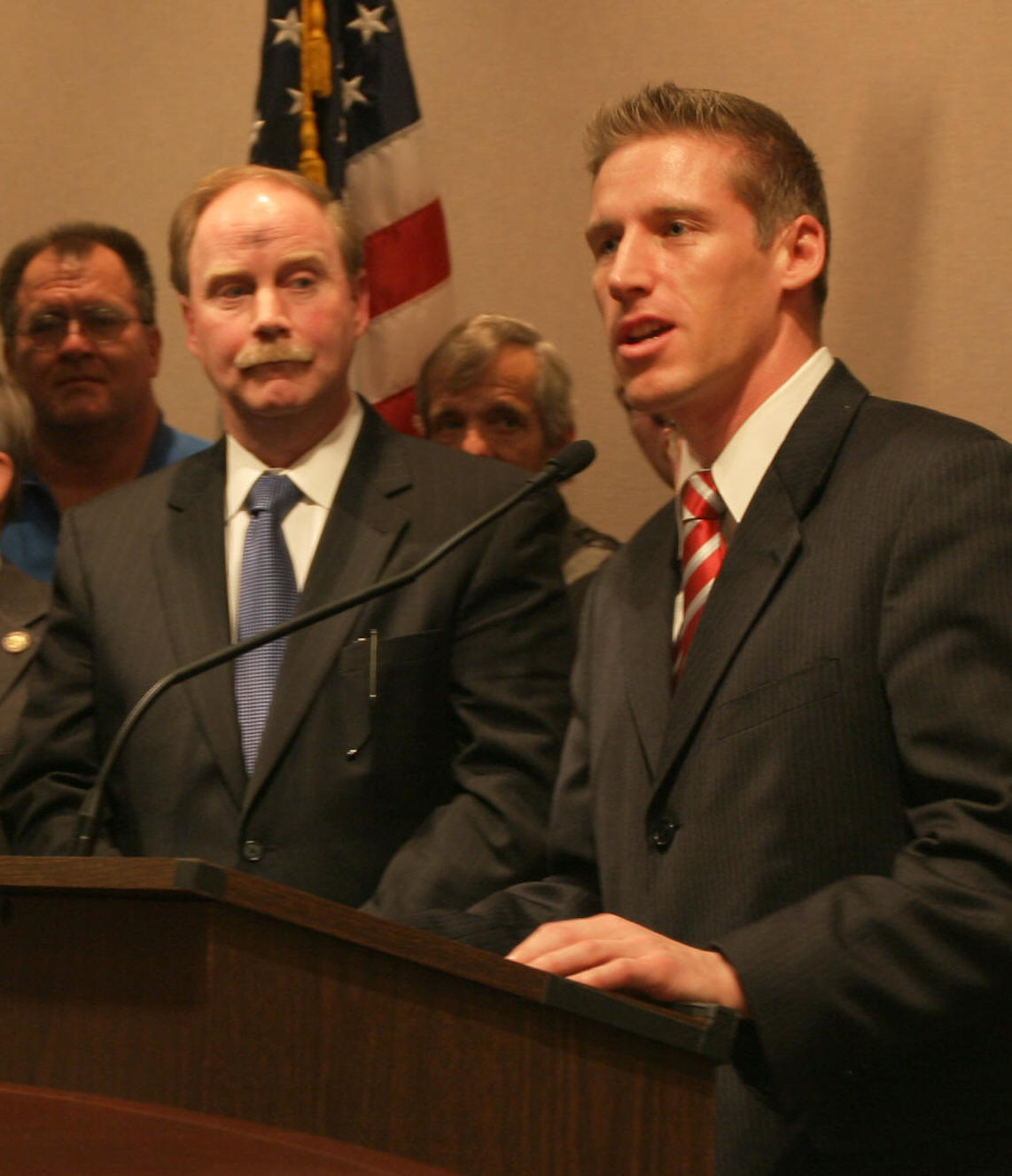

Connecticut State Representative from the 47th District
- In office 2009–2013
- Preceded by: Jack Malone
- Constituency: represents Norwich, Canterbury, Sprague, Scotland

Personal details
- Born: August 28, 1976 (age 50) Norwich, Connecticut
- Party: Republican
- Spouse: Neringa Coutu
- Children: (b. 2010) Alexandria Grace Coutu
- Education: University of Hartford, Eastern Connecticut State University, Three Rivers Community College, Air University
- Awards: National Defense; Expeditionary Medal; Humanitarian Service; Outstanding Volunteer
- Website: http://www.repcoutu.com/

Military service
- Branch/service: United States Air Force, Connecticut Air National Guard, Connecticut Army National Guard, New York Army National Guard
- Years of service: 1995–1998 (active); 1998–present (reserve)
- Rank: Major; Technical Sergeant (14 Years)
- Battles/wars: Operation Southern Watch

Christopher D. Coutu (born August 28, 1976) is an American Army National Guard officer, who also served as a three-term municipal and state elected leader.

From 2006 to 2010, he served as the only elected Republican state or federal legislative official in southeastern Connecticut, representing the state's 47th House district.

Coutu had declared his candidacy for the United States House of Representatives in May 2011. He was seeking to challenge third-term Congressman Joe Courtney, a Democrat, to represent Connecticut's 2nd congressional district. On May 10, 2012, he decided instead to run for the seat in Connecticut's 19th state Senate district being vacated by Edith Prague, a bid which was ultimately unsuccessful.

== Personal background ==
Christopher Coutu was born and grew up in Norwich, Connecticut.

=== Education ===
Coutu graduated from Norwich Tech High School with a certification in heating, ventilation, and air conditioning in 1994. From 1998 to 2003, Coutu earned multiple university degrees, including an MBA from Barney School of Business at the University of Hartford. To fund college tuition, he worked at the Mohegan Sun casino and also in social services. In his online biography, he says he was the first in his family to earn a college degree.

=== Military service ===
Coutu enlisted in the United States Air Force as an airman and completed the eight-month Avionics Guidance and Control Course at Keesler Air Force Base in 1995. He then served within the 16th Special Operations Wing out of Eglin Air Force Base, Florida, from 1995 to 1998. After his active duty service, Coutu served in the Air National Guard from 1998 to 2008. He was deployed to Kuwait in support of Operation Southern Watch at the time of the September 11 attacks in 2001. In 2004, he achieved the rank of Technical Sergeant as a Journeyman Avionics Technician and a Craftsman Education and Training Manager for the 103rd Fighter Wing in East Granby, Connecticut.

In 2009, after serving in an enlisted uniform for 14 years, Coutu graduated from Officer Candidate School. Coutu now serves as a Major Officer in the Connecticut Army National Guard and leader on the National Guard Innovation Team. Coutu remains active within the veteran community as a member of the Disabled American Veterans, VFW, American Legion, ESGR, AMVETS and the Association of the National Guard. In 2009, Coutu led an effort to reorganize the Norwich Area Veterans Council, a coalition of 20 veteran organizations in the region.

=== Professional career ===
Since 2006, Coutu has worked as an Industrial Engineering Consultant for the military, government agencies, manufacturing, and healthcare industries. In 2015, he earned the Army Leadership and Excellence Award for the 1109th TASMG, which saved hundreds of millions of dollars. He continues to work as an army officer as a member of the National Guard Innovation team.

In 2004, Coutu moved to work as a federal GS employee within the Department of Defense's Department of Civilian Personnel Management Services, where he visited 300 companies from Puerto Rico to Maine and worked with management and labor union members.

From 2002 to 2004, Coutu worked with his family's commercial fishing and trucking operation, Fitz-Sea.

=== AmericanWarrior ===
In 2006, Coutu established AmericanWarrior.org. The non-profit supports veterans and patriotic events. The organization is supported through private donations and has coordinated and financed for 1130 World War II and Korean War veterans to visit their war memorials in Washington, D.C.

AmericanWarrior formed Operation Freedom Legacy in 2008, which brings veterans to schools and other organizations to promote patriotism, democracy, and volunteerism. Thousands of students and youth groups from New England and Britain have volunteered to participate in a letter-writing campaign to honor veterans.

In 2012, AmericanWarrior coordinated a series of presentations and rallies for Veterans. The first was January 26 in Simsbury, Connecticut.

=== Community service ===
In 2006, Coutu established Briansquest.com. The organization raised money for a Norwich resident to get a guide dog.

Coutu is active with community organizations, including the Knights of Columbus, Sacred Heart Church, AHEPA, Taftville Volunteer Fire Department, Bully Busters, Taftville Lions, Civil Air Patrol, and the Greater Norwich Veterans and Winter Festival Parades. For his participation, the USAF has awarded him Outstanding Volunteer and Humanitarian medals. In 2008, Coutu received the University of Hartford's Humanitarian Award.

=== Family ===
Coutu married Neringa Proskute Coutu in 2004; in 2010, the couple had a daughter.

== Political career ==
Coutu is active with the American Legislative Exchange Council (ALEC), Grassroots East, SECTer, the Greater Norwich Chamber of Commerce, and the American Council of Young Political Leaders. In 2009, he joined a delegation of five nationally elected officials to explore the culture, politics, and government of Romania and Hungary.

=== Norwich alderman ===
Coutu earned a seat as an alderman on the Norwich City Council in 2007. During his tenure on the city council, he served on several committees, including the Board of Zoning Appeals, Mohegan Park Advisory, Public Works and Rehabilitation Review. He was the chairman for the Administrative Planning for Economic Development Committee. On February 7, 2008, Coutu stated, "It's the taxpayers' money," and led a bi-partisan effort to cap the annual tax increase.

=== Connecticut House of Representatives ===
He was first elected to the Connecticut House of Representatives in 2008. Coutu's 2008 state house victory was a rare victory for New England Republicans, capturing a previously Democratic seat from a 14-year incumbent, Jack Malone. He won the election 54% (5,449) to 46% (4,605). In 2010, despite being outspent by 33%, he earned a second term with a 58% to 42% victory over Sprague First Selectwoman, Cathy Osten.

As representative of Connecticut's 47th district, Coutu serves the City of Norwich and rural eastern towns of Canterbury, Scotland and Sprague, which are located in New London and Windham counties.

Coutu as the ranking member for the Insurance and Real Estate Committee in the Connecticut House of Representatives. He also serves on the Veterans and Commerce committees. He previously served on the Judiciary, Human Services and Finance, Revenue and Bonding committees.

Since 2009, Coutu participated in or hosted three dozen forums on energy, sexting, capital punishment, post-traumatic stress disorder, and the state budget.

=== Connecticut State Senate campaign ===
In May 2012, Coutu returned home from a three month Army training assignment. Shortly after returning to Connecticut he transitioned to a state Senate campaign.

Coutu challenged Osten to a series of debates saying, "I am eager to debate my opponent anywhere and any time in front of anyone. I believe now as I did a month ago, the more people educated to the issues across the 19th, the better."

On September 1, he asked Osten to join him and request the Governor end the inmate early release program. "This is part of a continuing trend of being soft on violent criminals," Coutu said. "This is a very dangerous slope." He also mentioned as a convenience store clerk he was assaulted in 1994.

On October 20, 2012, The New London Day endorsed Catherine Osten over Christopher Coutu for the vacant State Senate seat in the 19th district. Just two days later, the Norwich Bulletin followed The Day's lead by endorsing Catherine Osten over Christopher Coutu saying his lone vote against the jobs bill "epitomizes an unwillingness to compromise and it's the kind of political posturing that he has exhibited many times in his four years in the House, such as suing the governor and Democratic leadership alleging a violation of the State Constitution in enacting an unbalanced budget, having himself several weeks earlier done the exact same thing in voting for an unbalanced budget."

In October, The Connecticut Business and Industry Association (CBIA), Realtors PAC, Independent party and the National Federation of Independent Businesses endorsed Christopher Coutu for election to the state Senate in Connecticut's 19th District.

"Most voters say jobs and the economy are their top issues," said John R. Rathgeber, CBIA president and CEO. "Connecticut clearly needs lawmakers who can restore business confidence in our state so that employers invest, grow and create jobs here. We believe Chris Coutu is committed to making Connecticut a better state in which to do business, which means more and better jobs for our residents."

On October 24, Coutu was named a "Legislative Hero" by the Yankee Institute.

On November 6, 2012, Catherine Osten defeated Christopher Coutu by a 51.6 to 48.4 margin marking the end of his campaign.

=== Controversies ===
On October 26, the state of Connecticut's Elections Enforcement Commission began an investigation into whether or not Christopher Coutu improperly used funds from his aborted U.S. Congressional Campaign.

=== Congressional campaign ===
Coutu announced that he was exploring a run for Congress in April 2011. Six weeks later, he officially announced he would be a candidate for Connecticut's 2nd congressional district, running against Democratic Congressman Joe Courtney.

In November 2011, Coutu posted sixty billboard signs 14 months before the election.

In January 2012, Coutu announced he would be on Active Duty for Training for two and a half months. He returned home in May.

In May, Coutu cited family and a three-month military assignment as the primary reasons to stay local and run for the state Senate.

=== Connecticut Common Sense Coalition ===
In 2009, Coutu established a group called the Common Sense for Connecticut Coalition to promote fiscally conservative Republican candidates for office, citing complaints with the state government's fiscal policy. The coalition's mission statement emphasizes cutting state spending to balance the budget, including consolidating, privatizing, or outsourcing government services and targeting so-called "budget gimmicks". The CSCC's efforts contributed to the highest number of newly elected officials within one party since the removal of the party lever in 1986.

== Political stances ==
=== Connecticut Constitution ===
In 2009, the veto-proof Democratic majority proposed Connecticut Raised Bill 1098, which mandated independent committees to run religious organizations' finances. Coutu joined thousands in a protest rally and challenged this legislation as a member of the Judiciary Committee. Coutu called it "an embarrassment that it's even made it this far."

Coutu signed on to a 2010 resolution denouncing federal mandates, claiming they "squeezed budgets of cities and towns" and claiming they contravened the Tenth Amendment to the United States Constitution.

In May 2011, Coutu joined a group of Republican state legislators in challenging Connecticut Governor Dannel Malloy's budget in court. The plaintiffs claimed the budget was unconstitutional because it was signed into law with a $2 billion deficit. The lawsuit was thrown out at the Connecticut Superior Court on June 24.

=== Fiscal policy ===
Coutu is one of the most fiscally conservative members of the Connecticut House of Representatives. He has been a notable critic of Connecticut's fiscal policy, which he claims inhibits job creation. He opposes the extension of the State of Connecticut Earned Income Credit for middle-class and low-income families, stating that the federal tax credits for low-earning families are sufficient.

In 2011, he proposed removing the Small Business Entity Tax for businesses with 10 or fewer employees. and to cap bonding at 10% of total budget. Later that year, Coutu assisted and proposed a Connecticut no-tax budget.

On October 26, 2011, Coutu cast the lone no vote against a $1.1 billion piece of legislation. He stated, "How can we raise taxes on all families by $800 annually to provide hundreds of millions of dollars to a few private companies."

=== Gun control ===
In 2009, Coutu joined a bipartisan coalition that successfully challenged legislation that banned large-capacity ammunition magazines and firearm microstamping. He cosponsored mail in permit registration and deer hunting with a revolver. In 2010, he received an A rating from the National Rifle Association of America and was endorsed by the CT Citizen Defense League.

=== Climate change ===
In 2012, he accused Governor Daniel Malloy and his appointed Two Storm Panel of veering into politics by including a section on climate change. "We need to protect our coastal towns from flooding, but that isn't about pseudo-science and global warming, it's about preparation for storm surges".

=== Education ===
In 2010, Coutu was part of a bipartisan effort with 60 co-sponsors, 12 mayors, and a dozen organizations to support a pilot student scholarship program for students from low- and middle-income families. The May 7 vote, which failed 98–44, was the first relating to student scholarships in more than 20 years. In 2011, he proposed new student scholarship legislation to include special needs schools.

=== Election funding ===
Coutu is a critic of public funding for political campaigns in Connecticut and claims to be the only Connecticut Republican who publicly supports the Citizens' Election Program. He was one of the first candidates to qualify for state funding in 2008 and 2010, but testified in 2008 that much of this funding should be cut and has expressed concerns that the system could be abused during statewide races, including in the approval of a $3 million increase in funding for the Malloy campaign during the 2010 gubernatorial election.

=== People with disabilities ===
In 2010, Coutu, who was a personal care assistant (PCA), joined a group of citizens with disabilities to challenge HB 6486. In October 2011, Governor Daniel Malloy signed Executive Orders 9 and 10 to bypass the legislature and establish a way for unionization of PCAs and daycare providers. In response, Coutu formed an online petition to support citizens with disabilities. In 2014, the United States Supreme Court agreed with Coutu in Harris v. Quinn. The ruling finds that it is unconstitutional to require these individuals to financially support a union.

=== Unfunded mandates ===
As the ranking member on the Insurance and Real Estate Committee, Coutu has criticized what he refers to as "unfunded mandates" passed by the state legislature.

Coutu signed on to a 2010 resolution denouncing mandates, claiming they "squeezed budgets of cities and towns".

=== Unions ===
In 2011, Coutu stood side by side with thousands of state union employees. Thousands of government employees from multiple unions signed green cards requesting the opportunity to vote and potentially join another union called UPSEU. "This is all about bargaining unit members rights to be able to choose who represents them," said UPSEU attorney Barbara Resnick. She said not allowing a vote until 2015 is "fundamentally un-American, undemocratic and contrary to all basic fairness."

Rep. Coutu stated, "... the unions are the first ones to say, 'just let us vote' and today, for some reason, they won't let these good people vote and I think there is something wrong with that. You can't have it both ways."

=== Veterans ===
In 2010, Coutu served as the ranking member of the Select Committee on Veterans. He is one of 62 state elected officials in America who serve in the Armed Forces.

In 2012, Coutu successfully led a rally protesting $300,000 in funding for the Communist Party.
