= Connecticut's 23rd House of Representatives district =

American legislative district

Connecticut's 23rd State House of Representatives district
Representative
Devin Carney; R

Connecticut's 23rd House of Representatives district elects one member of the Connecticut House of Representatives. It consists of the towns of Lyme, Old Lyme, Old Saybrook, and part of Westbrook. It has been represented by Republican Devin Carney since 2015.

== List of representatives ==
List of Representatives from Connecticut's 23rd House District
Representative	Party	Years	District home	Note
Ruth Truex	Republican	1967–1973	Wethersfield	Seat created
Dominic J. Badolato	Democratic	1973–1977	New Britain	
Brian M. Desmond	Democratic	1977–1979	New Britain	
William P. Candelori	Democratic	1979–1987	New Britain	
Joseph S. Raia	Democratic	1987–1993	New Britain	
Terry Gerratana	Democratic	1993–2003	New Britain	
Marilyn Giuliano	Republican	2003–2015	Old Saybrook	
Devin Carney	Republican	2015–	Old Lyme	

== Recent elections ==
=== 2022 ===
2022 Connecticut's 23rd House of Representatives district election
- Precinct results Carney 50-60% 60-70% Heffernan 50-60%

2022 Connecticut State House of Representatives election, District 23
Party	Candidate	Votes	%
Republican	Devin Carney (incumbent)	6,880	53.10
Democratic	J. Colin Heffernan	5,869	45.30
Independent Party	Devin Carney (incumbent)	267	1.60
Total votes		12,956	100.00
Republican hold			

=== 2020 ===
2020 Connecticut's 23rd House of Representatives district election
- Precinct results Carney 50-60% Rubino 50-60%

2020 Connecticut State House of Representatives election, District 23
Party	Candidate	Votes	%
Republican	Devin Carney (incumbent)	8,510	52.55
Democratic	David A. Rubino	7,063	43.62
Independent Party	Devin Carney (incumbent)	423	2.61
Working Families	David A. Rubino	197	1.22
Total votes		16,193	100.00
Republican hold			

=== 2018 ===
2018 Connecticut's 23rd House of Representatives district election
- Precinct results Carney 50-60% 60-70% Pugliese 50-60%

2018 Connecticut State House of Representatives election, District 23
Party	Candidate	Votes	%
Republican	Devin Carney (incumbent)	6,854	53.08
Democratic	Matt Pugliese	5,566	43.11
Independent Party	Devin Carney (incumbent)	308	2.89
Working Families	Matt Pugliese	184	1.43
Total votes		12,912	100.00
Republican hold			

=== 2016 ===
2016 Connecticut's 23rd House of Representatives district election
- Precinct results Carney >90%

2016 Connecticut State House of Representatives election, District 23
Party	Candidate	Votes	%
Republican	Devin Carney (incumbent)	10,432	100.0
Total votes		10,432	100.00
Republican hold			

=== 2014 ===
2014 Connecticut State House of Representatives election, District 23
Party	Candidate	Votes	%
Republican	Devin Carney (incumbent)	5,672	54.8
Democratic	Mary J. Stone	4,290	41.4
Independent Party	Devin Carney (incumbent)	389	3.8
Total votes		10,351	100.00
Republican hold			

=== 2012 ===
2012 Connecticut State House of Representatives election, District 23
Party	Candidate	Votes	%
Republican	Marilyn Giuliano (incumbent)	7,848	61.4
Democratic	Adam Stillman	4,940	38.6
Total votes		12,788	100.00
Republican hold			
