= Andrew M. Maynard =

American politician

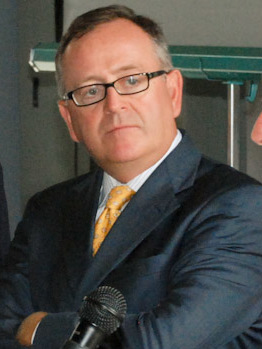

Member of the Connecticut State Senate from the 18th district
- In office January 2007 – January 2017
- Preceded by: Cathy Cook
- Succeeded by: Heather Somers

Personal details
- Born: July 14, 1962 (age 64) New London, Connecticut, US
- Party: Democratic
- Website: www.senatedems.ct.gov/maynard.php

Andrew M. Maynard is a Democratic American politician from Connecticut, and he was a member of the Connecticut State Senate representing the 18th District. He did not seek re-election in 2016 following an injury. He was succeeded by Republican Heather Somers.

Maynard is a resident of Stonington, Connecticut. He represented the towns of Griswold, Groton, North Stonington, Plainfield, Preston, Sterling, Stonington, and Voluntown.

== Career ==
Maynard had a 10-year career in local and regional government prior to his election to the state senate. He had served as the warden of Stonington Borough since 1999, leading the borough as its chief elected official; he was also involved in the Southeastern Connecticut Council of Governments, serving as vice chairman and leading its Legislative Committee.

Maynard ran for the state senate in 2004, losing by ten points to six-term incumbent Republican State Senator Cathy Cook. Cook retired from the state senate in 2006 to run for State Comptroller, which she lost to Democrat Nancy Wyman.

Maynard was educated at St. Bernard High School in Uncasville, Connecticut and earned his bachelor's degree from Connecticut College in New London.

== Senate ==
Maynard narrowly won election to the Senate in 2006, defeating Republican candidate Lenny Winkler by 51.4% to 48.6%, a margin of 832 votes. He was re-elected by a wide margin in 2008, winning 67% to his opponent's 33%. He was re-elected in 2010 in an unusual campaign which was waged in cooperation with his Republican opponent, Stuart Norman. The two of them traveled together and politely debated each other at campaign stops. This civility was unusual enough in the divisive 2010 election year that it was covered by The Daily Show.

Maynard served as Assistant Majority Whip and as Chairman of the Veterans' Affairs Committee. He was also on the Environment, General Law, and Program Review and Investigations Committees.

== Personal life ==
Maynard is openly gay.

=== 2014 injury ===
In the early morning hours of July 21, 2014, Maynard fell on the steps outside of his home in Stonington, CT. He was taken to a hospital in Rhode Island, where as of the next day, he was in "serious, but stable" condition.

Connecticut State Senate
Preceded by Cathy Cook	Member of the Connecticut Senate from the 18th District; January 2007 – January 2017	Succeeded by Heather Somers
