= Raghib Allie-Brennan =

American politician

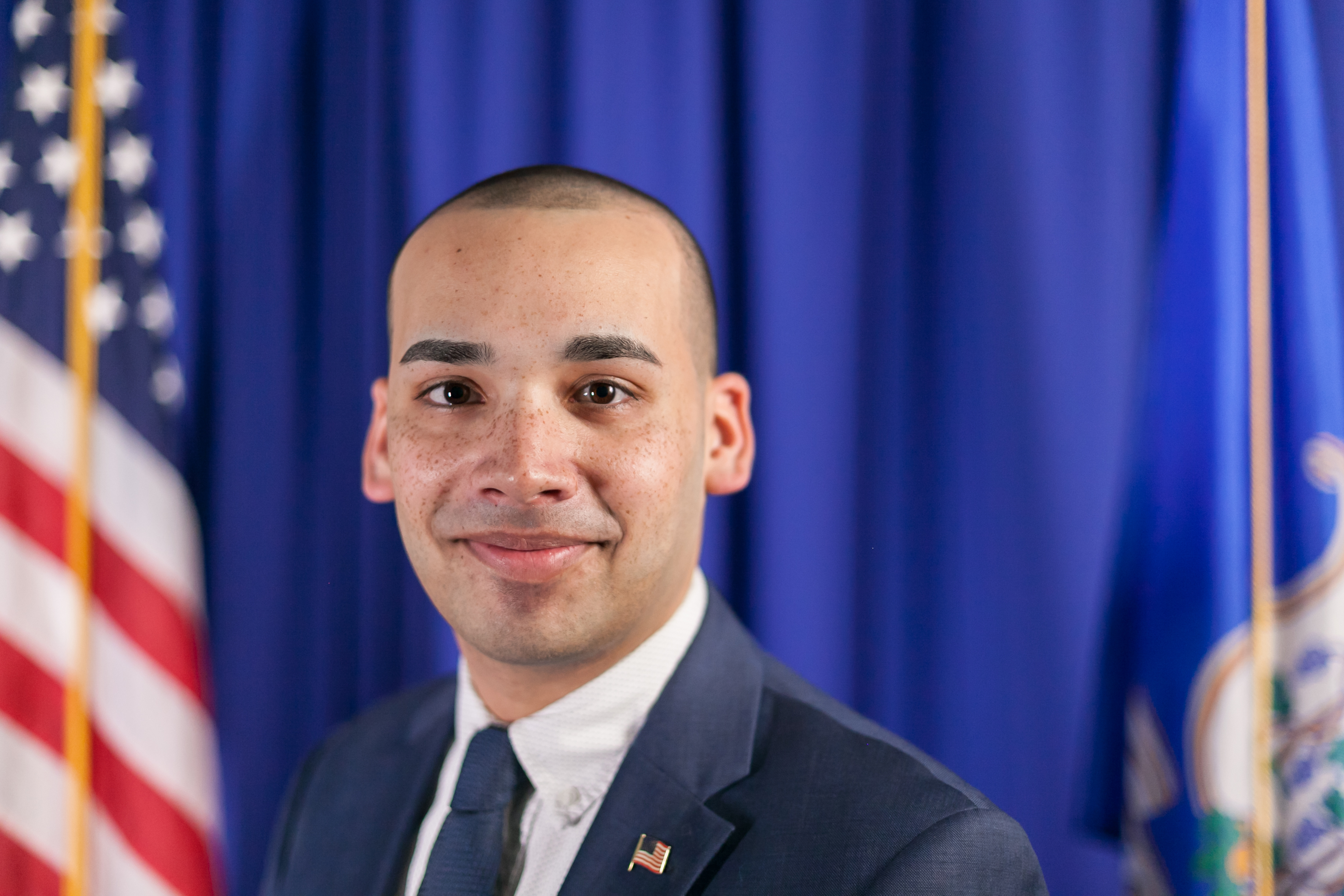

Member of the Connecticut House of Representatives from the 2nd district
- Incumbent
- Assumed office January 9, 2019
- Preceded by: Will Duff

Personal details
- Born: Raghib Ismail Allie-Brennan; July 20, 1991 (age 35) Queens, New York, U.S.
- Party: Democratic
- Education: Marymount Manhattan College (BA)

Raghib Ismail Allie-Brennan (born on July 20, 1991) is an American politician serving as a member of the Connecticut House of Representatives from the 2nd district, which encompasses most of Bethel and parts of Danbury, since 2019. In 2025, Allie-Brennan was arrested on two occasions and charged with shoplifting at a Target located in Bethel.

== Early life and education ==
Allie-Brennan was born in Queens, New York and raised in Bethel, Connecticut. His father immigrated to New York City from Guyana. He graduated from Bethel High School in 2009, and earned a B.A. in International Relations from Marymount Manhattan College in 2013.

== Political career ==
After earning his bachelor's degree, Allie-Brennan worked as a congressional advisor in the United States House of Representatives, specializing in energy and environmental issues, disaster relief, and civil rights legislation. He worked as a district aide assistant to Elizabeth Esty, a legislative aide and advisor to Alma Adams and as an intern for Cedric Richmond.

In 2016, Allie-Brennan ran for the Connecticut House of Representatives in the 2nd district, where Republican incumbent Dan E. Carter was not seeking re-election to run for U.S Senate. Allie-Brennan faced Republican Will Duff, who narrowly defeated him. In the 2018 election, Allie-Brennan defeated Duff in a rematch.

== Personal life ==
Allie-Brennan is openly gay.

In June 2025, Allie-Brennan was arrested and charged with shoplifting at a Target located in Bethel. Allie-Brennan blamed being in a rush to visit his grandmother, the Target not having bags, and juggling two orders at the same time as to why some items weren't paid for. One month later, a second arrest for shoplifting was made. Following this, he was temporarily stripped of his committee assignments.
