= Speaker of the Connecticut House of Representatives =

American politician

The speaker of the Connecticut House of Representatives is the presiding officer of the Connecticut House of Representatives.

== Speakers, 1699-1818 ==
A list of speakers of the Speaker of the Connecticut House of Representatives from 1699 to 1818 is available at

== Speakers since 1818 ==
Picture	Name	Town	Political party	Term of service
	David Plant	Stratford	Toleration Republican	1819, 1820
	Elisha Phelps	Simsbury	Toleration Republican	1821
	Seth P. Beers	Litchfield	Toleration Republican	1822, 1823
	Ralph I. Ingersoll	New Haven	Toleration Republican	1824
	Samuel A. Foot	Cheshire	National Republican	1825, 1826
	Ebenezer Young	Killingly	National Republican	1827, 1828
	Elisha Phelps	Simsbury	National Republican	1829
	Henry W. Edwards	New Haven	Jacksonian	1830
	Martin Welles	Wethersfield	National Republican	1831, 1832
	Samuel Ingham	Saybrook	Jacksonian	1833
	Roger Huntington	Norwich	National Republican	1834 (Resigned May 24, 1834)
	William L. Storrs	Middletown	National Republican	1834
	Samuel Ingham	Saybrook	Democratic	1835 (Resigned May 15, 1835)
	Chauncey F. Cleveland	Hampton	Democratic	1835, 1836
	Stillman K. Wightman	Middletown	Democratic	1837
	William W. Boardman	New Haven	Whig	1838, 1839
	Charles J. McCurdy	Lyme	Whig	1840, 1841
	Stillman K. Wightman	Middletown	Democratic	1842
	Noyes Billings	New London	Democratic	1843
	Charles J. McCurdy	Lyme	Whig	1844
	William W. Boardman	NewHaven	Whig	1845
	Cyrus H. Beardslee	Monroe	Democratic	1846
	Lafayette S. Foster	Norwich	Whig	1847, 1848
	John C. Lewis	Plymouth	Free Soil Democratic	1849
	Origen S. Seymour	Litchfield	Democratic	1850
	Samuel Ingham	Saybrook	Democratic	1851
	Charles B. Phelps	Woodbury	Democratic	1852
	William W. Eaton	Hartford	Democratic	1853
	Lafayette S. Foster	Norwich	Whig	1854 (Resigned June 8, 1854)
	Green Kendrick	Waterbury	Whig	1854
	Austin Baldwin	Middletown	American	1855
	Green Kendrick	Waterbury	Whig	1856
	Eliphalet A. Bulkeley	Hartford	Republican	1857
	Alfred A. Burnham	Windham	Republican	1858
	Oliver H. Perry	Fairfield	Republican	1859, 1860
	Augustus Brandegee	New London	Republican	1861
	Henry C. Deming	Hartford	Democratic	1861 (Elected Oct. 9, 1861)
	Josiah M. Carter	Norwalk	Republican	1862
	Chauncey F. Cleveland	Hampton	Republican	1863
	John S. Rice	Farmington	Union	1864
	Eleazer K. Foster	New Haven	Republican	1865
	David Gallup	Plainfield	Union	1866
	John T. Wait	Norwich	Union	1867
	Charles Ives	East Haven	Republican	1868
	Orville H. Platt	Meriden	Republican	1869
	Lafayette S. Foster	Norwich	Republican	1870 (Resigned June 16, 1870)
	Alfred A. Burnham	Windham	Republican	1870
	Edwin H. Bugbee	Killingly	Republican	1871
	Amos S. Treat	Woodbridge	Republican	1872
	William W. Eaton	Hartford	Democratic	1873
	Tilton E. Doolittle	New Haven	Democratic	1874
	Charles Durand	Derby	Republican	1875
	Thomas M. Waller	New London	Democratic	1876
	Lynde Harrison	Guilford	Republican	1877
	Charles H. Briscoe	Enfield	Republican	1878
	Dexter R. Wright	New Haven	Republican	1879
	Dwight Marcy	Vernon	Republican	1880
	William C. Case	Granby	Republican	1881
	John Manning Hall	Windham	Republican	1882
	Charles H. Pine	Derby	Republican	1883
	Henry B. Harrison	New Haven	Republican	1884
	William Edgar Simonds	Canton	Republican	1885
	John A. Tibbits	New London	Republican	1886
	Heusted W. R. Hoyt	Greenwich	Republican	1887
	John H. Perry	Fairfield	Republican	1889
	Allen W. Paige	Huntington	Republican	1891
	Isaac W. Brooks	Torrington	Republican	1893
	Samuel Fessenden	Stamford	Republican	1895
	Joseph L. Barbour	Hartford	Republican	1897
	Frank B. Brandegee	New London	Republican	1899
	John H. Light	Norwalk	Republican	1901
	Michael Kenealy	Stamford	Republican	1903
	Marcus H. Holcomb	Southington	Republican	1905
	John Q. Tilson	New Haven	Republican	1907
	Elmore S. Banks	Fairfield	Republican	1909
	Frederick A. Scott	Plymouth	Republican	1911
	Morris C. Webster	Harwinton	Republican	1913
	Frank E. Healy	Windsor Locks	Republican	1915
	James F. Walsh	Greenwich	Republican	1917
	Frederick W. Huxford	Stamford	Republican	1921
	Leonard J. Nickerson	Cornwall	Republican	1923
	Elbert L. Darbie	Killingly	Republican	1925
	John H. Hill	Shelton	Republican	1927
	Samuel A. Eddy	North Canaan	Republican	1929
	Howard W. Alcorn	Suffield	Republican	1931
	William Hanna	Bethel	Republican	1933, 1935
	J. Mortimer Bell	Salisbury	Republican	1937
	Walter Howe	Litchfield	Republican	1939
	Hugh Meade Alcorn Jr.	Suffield	Republican	1941
	Harold E. Mitchell	West Hartford	Republican	1943
	E. Lea Marsh Jr.	Old Lyme	Republican	1945
	Frederick H. Holbrook	Madison	Republican	1947
	John R. Thim	Hamden	Republican	1949
	Mansfield D. Sprague	New Canaan	Republican	1951
	Arthur E. B. Tanner	Woodbury	Republican	1953
	W. Sheffield Cowles	Farmington	Republican	1955
	Nelson C. L. Brown, II	Groton	Republican	1957
	William J. O'Brien Jr.	Portland	Democratic	1959
	Anthony E. Wallace	Simsbury	Republican	1961
	J. Tyler Patterson Jr.	Old Lyme	Republican	1963-1965
	Robert J. Testo	Bridgeport	Democratic	1967
	William R. Ratchford	Danbury	Democratic	1969-1973
	Francis J. Collins	Brookfield Center	Republican	1973-1975
	James Kennelly	Hartford	Democratic	1975-1979
	Ernest N. Abate	Stamford	Democratic	1979-1983
	Irving J. Stolberg	New Haven	Democratic	1983-1985
	R. E. Van Norstrand	Darien	Republican	1985-1987
	Irving J. Stolberg	New Haven	Democratic	1987-1989
	Richard J. Balducci	Newington	Democratic	1989-1993
	Thomas D. Ritter	Hartford	Democratic	1993-1999
	Moira K. Lyons	Stamford	Democratic	1999-2005
	James A. Amann	Milford	Democratic	2005-2009
	Christopher G. Donovan	Meriden	Democratic	2009-2013
	J. Brendan Sharkey	Hamden	Democratic	2013-2017
	Joe Aresimowicz	Berlin	Democratic	2017-2021
	Matthew Ritter	Hartford	Democratic	2021-
