= 2016 United States Senate election in Connecticut =

- November 8, 2016
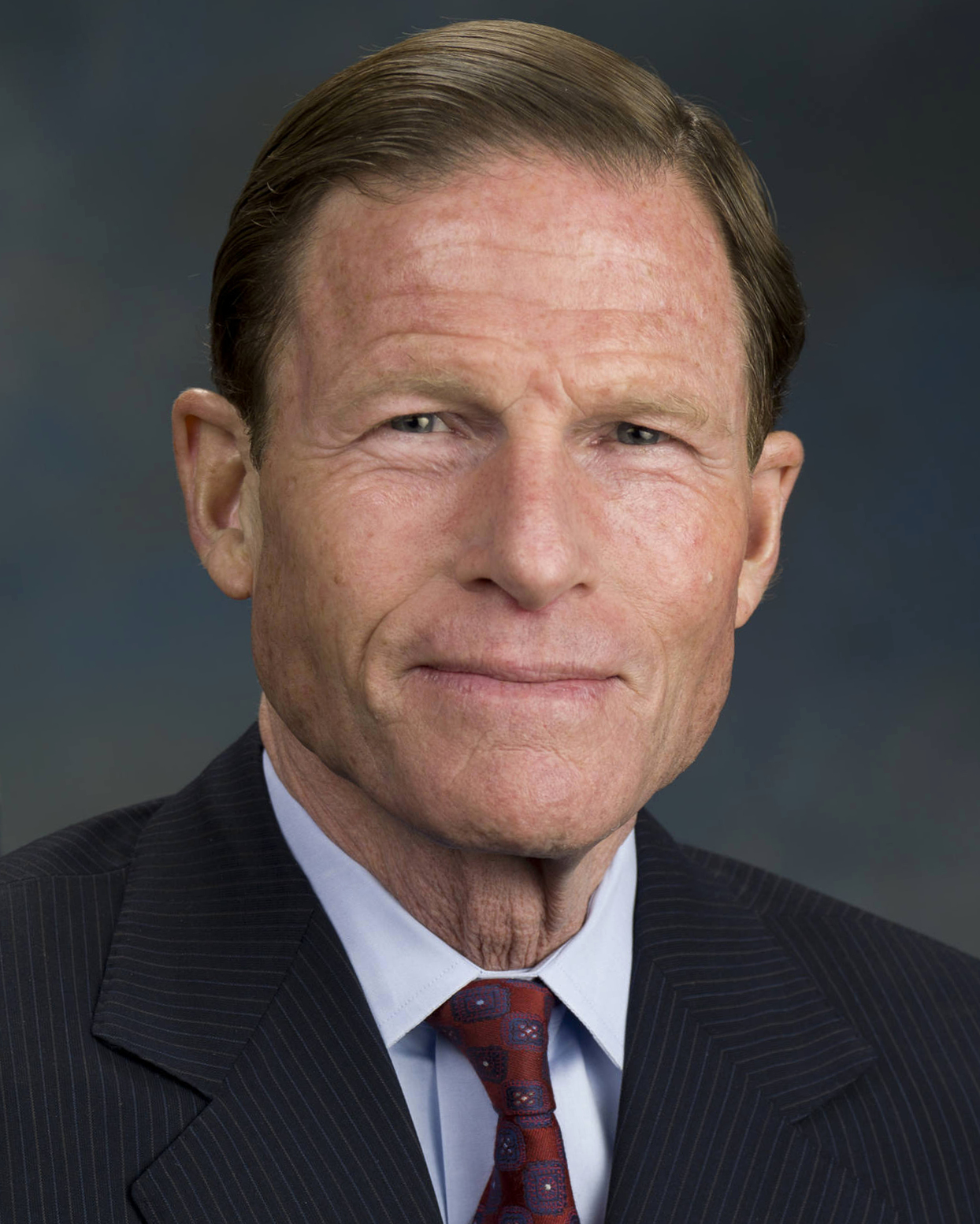

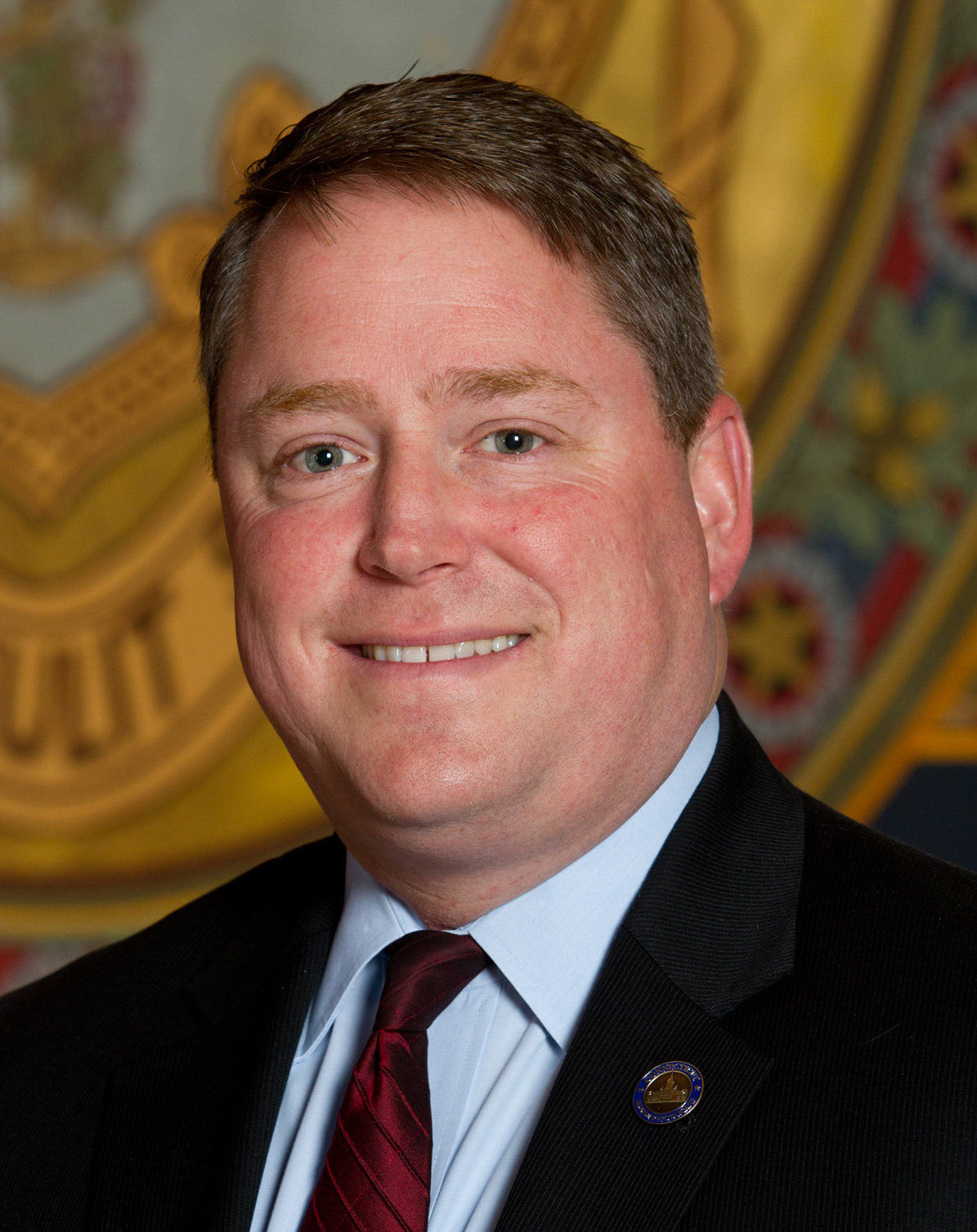
Nominee	Richard Blumenthal	Dan Carter
Party	Democratic	Republican
Alliance	Working Families
Popular vote	1,008,714	552,621
Percentage	63.19%	34.62%
- Blumenthal: 40–50% 50–60% 60–70% 70–80% 80–90% >90% Carter: 40–50% 50–60% 60–70%
U.S. senator before election
Richard Blumenthal
Democratic
Elected U.S. Senator
Richard Blumenthal
Democratic

The 2016 United States Senate election in Connecticut was held November 8, 2016, to elect a member of the United States Senate to represent the State of Connecticut, concurrently with the 2016 U.S. presidential election, as well as other elections to the United States Senate in other states and elections to the United States House of Representatives, and various state and local elections.

Incumbent Democratic Senator Richard Blumenthal won re-election to a second term in office. Blumenthal's final vote total of 1,008,714 at the time made him the largest vote-receiver in the history of statewide elections in the state. (Blumenthal's record was later broken by then-Vice President Joe Biden in the 2020 presidential election; Biden received 1,080,680 votes.) He also became the first person to exceed 1 million votes in the history of statewide elections in Connecticut. He remains the highest vote-receiver in the history of statewide elections besides the presidency.

== Democratic nomination ==
=== Candidates ===
==== Declared ====
- Richard Blumenthal, incumbent U.S. senator

== Republican nomination ==
=== Declared ===
- Dan Carter, State Representative

=== Withdrew at convention ===
- Jack Orchulli, CEO and co-founder of a Michael Kors apparel company; nominee for the U.S. Senate in 2004

=== Failed to qualify ===
- August Wolf, investment executive and former Olympic athlete

=== Declined ===
- Larry Kudlow, economist, television personality and columnist
- Linda McMahon, businesswoman, former CEO of WWE, and nominee for U.S. Senate in 2010 and 2012
- Rob Simmons, Stonington first selectman, former U.S. representative and candidate for U.S. Senate in 2010
- Joe Visconti, former West Hartford town Ccuncilor, nominee for CT-01 in 2008 and Independent candidate for governor in 2014
- David Walker, former Comptroller General of the United States and candidate for lieutenant governor in 2014

=== Republican convention ===
The Republican state convention was held May 9, 2016, at the Connecticut Convention Center to select candidates for the U.S. Senate and U.S. House of Representatives. State Representative Dan Carter received the nomination with 76.7% of the delegate vote. Neither Jack Orchulli nor August Wolf received the necessary 15% of the delegate vote necessary to be granted an automatic primary on August 9, 2016. In the first round of voting, Wolf received 179 delegate votes, equalling 15.1% and qualifying for a primary. However, before balloting closed, Orchulli dropped from the race and publicly endorsed Dan Carter, urging his candidates to switch their votes. During the vote switching, an additional 56 delegates that had voted for Wolf also switched their vote, dropping him well below the 15% threshold.

On May 11, 2016, Wolf announced an attempt to force a primary by collecting the signatures of 8,079 registered Republicans by June 7. However, on June 21, 2016, it was announced that Wolf had failed to reach the required signature threshold to force a primary, and he conceded the Republican nomination to Carter as a result.

==== Convention results ====
Candidate	Delegates	Percentage
Dan Carter	907	76.7%
August Wolf	123	10.4%
Jack Orchulli	20	1.7%
Not Present	132	11.2%

=== Endorsements ===
Dan Carter
- Len Fasano, minority leader of the Connecticut Senate
- Themis Klarides, minority leader of the Connecticut House of Representatives
- Jack Orchulli, former candidate for the U.S. Senate

== General election ==
=== Debates ===
Dates	Location	Blumenthal	Carter	Link
October 23, 2016	Rocky Hill, Connecticut	Participant	Participant	

=== Predictions ===
Source	Ranking	As of
The Cook Political Report	Safe D	November 2, 2016
Sabato's Crystal Ball	Safe D	November 7, 2016
Rothenberg Political Report	Safe D	November 3, 2016
Daily Kos	Safe D	November 8, 2016
Real Clear Politics	Safe D	November 7, 2016

=== Polling ===
Poll source	Date(s) administered	Sample size	Margin of error	Richard Blumenthal (D)	Dan Carter (R)	Undecided
SurveyMonkey	November 1–7, 2016	1,387	± 4.6%	63%	34%	3%
SurveyMonkey	October 31 – November 6, 2016	1,173	± 4.6%	62%	35%	3%
SurveyMonkey	October 28 – November 3, 2016	925	± 4.6%	62%	36%	2%
SurveyMonkey	October 27 – November 2, 2016	753	± 4.6%	62%	36%	2%
SurveyMonkey	October 26 – November 1, 2016	616	± 4.6%	60%	38%	2%
SurveyMonkey	October 25–31, 2016	554	± 4.6%	59%	38%	3%
Emerson College	September 2–5, 2016	1,000	± 3.0%	54%	33%	9%
Quinnipiac University	June 1–5, 2016	1,330	± 2.7%	60%	30%	10%

Hypothetical polling

with August Wolf

Poll source	Date(s) administered	Sample size	Margin of error	Richard Blumenthal (D)	August Wolf (R)	Undecided
Quinnipiac University	October 7–11, 2015	1,735	± 2.4%	61%	26%	13%
Quinnipiac University	June 1–5, 2016	1,330	± 2.7%	62%	27%	11%

with Larry Kudlow

Poll source	Date(s) administered	Sample size	Margin of error	Richard Blumenthal (D)	Larry Kudlow (R)	Undecided
Quinnipiac University	October 7–11, 2015	1,735	± 2.4%	61%	27%	12%

=== Results ===

United States Senate election in Connecticut, 2016
Party	Candidate	Votes	%	±%
Democratic	Richard Blumenthal	920,766	57.68%	+5.20%
Working Families	Richard Blumenthal	87,948	5.51%	+2.83%
Total	Richard Blumenthal (incumbent)	1,008,714	63.19%	+8.03%
Republican	Dan Carter	552,621	34.62%	−8.60%
Libertarian	Richard Lion	18,190	1.14%	N/A
Green	Jeffery Russell	16,713	1.05%	N/A
Independent	Andrew Rule (write-in)	26	0.00%	N/A
Independent	John M. Traceski (write-in)	12	0.00%	N/A
Total votes		1,596,276	100.0%	N/A
Democratic hold				

==== By county ====
County	Richard Blumenthal Democratic		Dan Carter Republican		Various candidates Other parties		Total votes cast	
County	Fairfield	249,887	61.44%	148,935	36.62%	7,887	1.93%	406,709
Hartford	265,018	66.91%	122,624	30.96%	8,430	2.12%	396,072	
Litchfield	49,872	52.2%	43,519	45.55%	2,147	2.25%	95,538	
Middlesex	53,960	62.09%	30,996	35.66%	1,957	1.25%	86,913	
New Haven	239,991	65.38%	119,774	32.63%	7,283	1.98%	367,048	
New London	75,188	63.27%	40,238	33.86%	3,414	2.87%	118,840	
Tolland	45,949	60.38%	27,989	36.78%	2,166	2.85%	76,104	
Windham	28,849	58.81%	18,546	37.81%	1,657	3.37%	49,052	
Total	1,008,714	63.19%	552,621	34.62%	34,941	1.19%	1,596,276	

Counties that flipped from Republican to Democratic

- Litchfield (largest city: Torrington)

==== By congressional district ====
Blumenthal won all five congressional districts by comfortable double-digit margins.

District	Blumenthal	Carter	Representative
1st	68%	30%	John B. Larson
2nd	61%	36%	Joe Courtney
3rd	68%	30%	Rosa DeLauro
4th	62%	36%	Jim Himes
5th	58%	40%	Elizabeth Esty
