= Debra Lee =

Debra Lee may refer to:

- Debra L. Lee, American businesswoman
- Debralee Scott, American actress
- DebraLee Hovey, American politician
