= Moira K. Lyons =

American politician

Speaker of the Connecticut House of Representatives
- In office January 6, 1999 – January 5, 2005
- Preceded by: Thomas D. Ritter
- Succeeded by: James A. Amann

Member of the Connecticut House of Representatives from the 146th district
- In office 1981–2005
- Preceded by: Jerry Simonelli
- Succeeded by: Gerald M. Fox III

Personal details
- Born: Trenton, New Jersey, U.S.
- Party: Democratic
- Children: 2
- Education: Georgian Court University (BA)

Moira K. Lyons is an American retired politician from Stamford, Connecticut who served as a member of the Connecticut House of Representatives from 1981 to 2005. She also served as the speaker of the Connecticut House of Representatives from 1999 to 2005.

== Early life and education ==
Lyons was born in Trenton, New Jersey. She attended Miami University in Oxford, Ohio and earned a Bachelor of Arts degree in English from the Georgian Court University.

== Career ==
Lyons served on the Stamford Board of Representatives from 1979 to 1981. She was elected to the Connecticut State Assembly in 1980. She was elected house majority leader in 1995 and served until 1998. Lyons was the first woman ever to be elected speaker of the Connecticut House of Representatives retiring in 2004 after three terms as speaker. Lyons and Richard J. Balducci are the only three term speakers in the history of the Connecticut House of Representatives.

Connecticut House of Representatives
| Preceded by Jerry Simonelli | Member of the Connecticut House of Representatives from the 146th district 1981–2005 | Succeeded by Gerald M. Fox III |
Political offices
| Preceded by Thomas D. Ritter | Speaker of the Connecticut House of Representatives; 1999–2005 | Succeeded by James A. Amann |
