= Senator Mather =

Senator Mather may refer to:

- Hiram F. Mather (1796–1868), New York State Senate
- John C. Mather (New York politician) (1813–1882), New York State Senate
- John Perkins Cushing Mather (1816–1891), Connecticut State Senate

== See also ==
- Tim Mathern (born 1950), North Dakota State Senate
