= Irving J. Stolberg =

American politician (1936–2009)

Speaker of the Connecticut House of Representatives
- In office 1987–1988
- Preceded by: Ralph E. Van Norstrand
- Succeeded by: Richard J. Balducci
- In office 1983–1984
- Preceded by: Ernest N. Abate
- Succeeded by: Ralph E. Van Norstrand

Member of the Connecticut House of Representatives from the 93rd district
- In office 1973–1993
- Preceded by: Eloise Green
- Succeeded by: Howard Scipio

President of the National Conference of State Legislatures
- In office 1986–1987
- Preceded by: David Nething
- Succeeded by: Ted L. Strickland

Personal details
- Born: September 24, 1936 Philadelphia, Pennsylvania, U.S.
- Died: February 13, 2009 (aged 72) Branford, Connecticut, U.S.
- Party: Democratic
- Spouse: Alicia Barela
- Children: 1
- Education: University of California, Los Angeles (MA; Boston University (MS, PhD)

Irving J. Stolberg (September 24, 1936 – February 13, 2009) was an American academic and politician from Connecticut. He was the Speaker of the Connecticut House of Representatives in 1983–1984 and again in 1987–1988.

== Early life and education ==
Irving J. Stolberg was born on September 24, 1936, in Philadelphia, Pennsylvania to Ralph Stolberg and Lillian Blank Alpert. He grew up primarily in Los Angeles and earned a masters in International Relations from the University of California, Los Angeles in 1958. He also earned a masters and completed his coursework, but not his dissertation, for a Ph.D in Geography and African Studies from Boston University. He ws Jewish.

== Career ==
=== Academics ===
Stolberg taught Geography at Southern Connecticut State University and Quinnipiac University. Stolberg contributed the "Connecticut" entry to the Encyclopædia Britannica.

=== Politics ===
Stolberg served in the Connecticut House of Representatives for 22 years.

In 1989, Stolberg attempted to run for a third term as Speaker of the House. This run was historic because the Connecticut House of Representatives limits Speakers to two terms by tradition and no speaker before him had ever successfully run for a third term. He was opposed by Gov. William A. O'Neill and a bi-partisan group of Representatives who rallied around the more centrist Richard J. Balducci. Irving was defeated 94 to 57 with all 63 Republicans in the House casting their vote for Balducci. Balducci’s successor Thomas D. Ritter would be the first three term Speaker in State history.

He was appointed by President Bill Clinton to the U.S. Commission for the Preservation of America's Heritage Abroad.

He was the President of the Connecticut Division of the United Nations Association and in 2006 he represented the United States on the Executive Committee of the World Federation of United Nations Associations (WFUNA). During his time at the UNA he oversaw the publication of the UNA Calendar for Peace.

Connecticut House of Representatives
| Preceded by Morris I. Olmer | Member of the Connecticut House of Representatives from the 112th district 1971–1973 | Succeeded by George A. Johnson Jr. |
| Preceded by Eloise B. Green | Member of the Connecticut House of Representatives from the 93rd district 1973–1993 | Succeeded by Howard Scipio |
Political offices
| Preceded by Ernest N. Abate | Speaker of the Connecticut House of Representatives; 1983–1985 | Succeeded by Ralph E. Van Norstrand |
| Preceded by Ralph E. Van Norstrand | Speaker of the Connecticut House of Representatives; 1987–1989 | Succeeded by Richard J. Balducci |
