= Dan E. Carter =

American politician

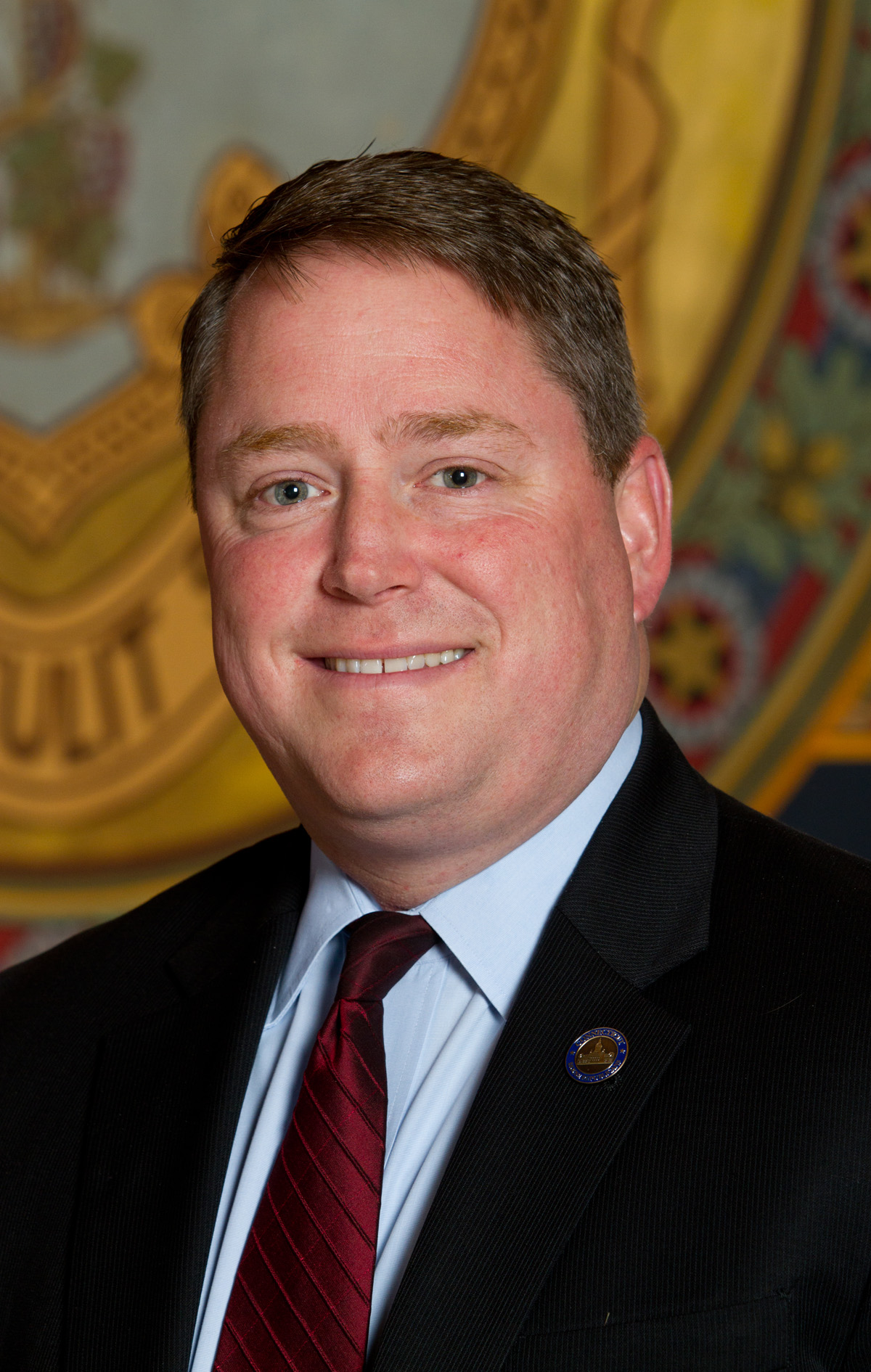

Member of the Connecticut House of Representatives from the 2nd district
- In office January 5, 2011 – January 5, 2017
- Preceded by: Jason Bartlett
- Succeeded by: William Duff

Personal details
- Born: Daniel E. Carter; September 18, 1967 (age 58) Vandalia, Ohio, U.S.
- Party: Republican
- Spouses: Cordy Puglio; (m. 1994; div. 2002); Jane McBride (m. 2016)
- Children: 2
- Education: Bowling Green State University (BA); Embry-Riddle Aeronautical University (MS)
- Website: Official website

Military service
- Allegiance: United States
- Branch/service: United States Air Force
- Years of service: 1989–2014
- Battles/wars: Operation Desert Storm; Bosnian War
- Awards: Meritorious Service Medal

Daniel E. Carter (born September 18, 1967) is an American politician from Connecticut. A Republican, he was elected to his first term in the Connecticut House of Representatives in November 2010, representing the state's second district in Bethel, Danbury and Redding. Following redistricting, in 2012 Newtown was added to the second district when Carter won a second term. He was the Republican Party nominee in the 2016 U.S. Senate election in Connecticut, losing to incumbent Democrat Richard Blumenthal. He currently serves as the first selectman of the town of Bethel.

== Early life and education ==
Carter is a son of Emery A. Carter and Kathryn Carter of Vandalia, Ohio. His mother was a nurse for a local physician. His father was a deputy sheriff for Montgomery County. Carter has one younger brother, David.

Carter was active in his community and Boy Scouts as a youth and earned the rank of Eagle Scout. He graduated from Vandalia-Butler High School. He earned a student Bachelor of Arts degree in political science from Bowling Green State University and a Master of Aeronautical Science degree from Embry-Riddle Aeronautical University.

== Career ==
After graduation from college, Carter was commissioned as an officer in the United States Air Force through ROTC. He completed Undergraduate Pilot Training at Reese AFB in Lubbock, Texas and was assigned to the 40th Tactical Airlift Squadron at Pope AFB in Fayetteville, North Carolina to fly the C-130 Hercules. Carter's most notable missions were flown in support of Operation Desert Storm, Operation Provide Comfort, and Operation Provide Promise.

Carter was assigned as an Instructor Pilot in the 50th Flying Training Squadron at Columbus AFB in Columbus, Mississippi flying the T-38 Talon. After two years, Carter was assigned to the 48th Flying Training Squadron as an Instructor Pilot in the T-1A Jayhawk. In addition to training student pilots, Carter held a variety of staff positions including Strategic Plans Officer, Airspace Manager, Safety Officer, Current Operations Flight Commander, and Assistant Operations Officer. While stationed in Mississippi, Carter taught as an Adjunct Instructor for Embry-Riddle Aeronautical University.

Carter's active military duty ended in 1999, after which he pursued a career in healthcare. Carter worked for Pfizer Inc., where he represented medications to physicians and hospitals. His specialties included Cardiology, Pediatrics, Urology, Rheumatology, Orthopedics, and Neurology. Carter served in the Air Force Reserve as an Admissions Liaison for the United States Air Force Academy.

Carter was elected to the Connecticut state House of Representatives in 2010, unseating incumbent Democratic State Representative Jason Bartlett by 4181 (52%) to 3920 (48%).

In 2012, Carter was elected to a second term after defeating his challenger, Democrat Steven DeMoura.

In 2014, Carter won third term after defeating his challenger, Candace Fay.

2013 Connecticut Gun Legislation

Following the Sandy Hook School shooting in which twenty first-graders and six educators were killed, Carter introduced legislation containing numerous gun control proposals, including universal background checks and restrictions on parole and early release for gun crimes. In 2013, and again in 2015, Carter also introduced legislation that addressed firearm access for people diagnosed with mental illness and determined to be at risk of harming themselves or others. Carter was the only representative for Newtown to vote against the new gun laws passed in Connecticut, citing the "over-reaching nature of the bill" and that the bill would "promote the growing rift between those that own guns and those that do not." Carter supports "No-Fly, No-Buy" legislation, as long it includes checks and balances for gun buyers wrongly placed on terrorist watch lists.

=== 2016 U.S. Senate campaign ===
On April 4, 2016, Representative Carter announced his intention to seek the U.S. Senate seat held by Democrat Richard Blumenthal. He was being challenged for the nomination by Jack Orchulli, CEO and co-founder of a Michael Kors apparel company and nominee for the U.S. Senate for this seat in 2004 and by August Wolf, investment executive and former Olympic athlete. At the statewide convention at the Connecticut Convention Center in Hartford, held on Monday, May 9, 2016, Dan was overwhelmingly selected by the delegates to be the Republican candidate with 907 delegate votes to August Wolf's 123 and Jack Orchulli's 20. Connecticut Republican Party rules state any candidate receiving 15% of the delegate votes may force a primary, which would be held on August 9. In the initial vote, August Wolf received 179 votes, qualifying him for a primary with 15.1%. However, convention rules state that delegates may switch their vote after the initial tally. Candidate Jack Orchulli conceded defeat after the initial vote, but before the switch, and endorsed Dan Carter, encouraging his delegates to switch their vote. During the switch, an additional 56 delegates supporting August Wolf, changed their vote to Dan Carter.

The campaign saw only one debate between Carter and Blumenthal which was orderly and collegial.

Carter was a decided underdog against Blumenthal, with nearly all handicappers rating the race as "Safe Democratic" or its equivalent. In the general election, he tallied 34.6 percent to Blumenthal's 63.2 percent, only carrying 14 of the state's 169 towns.

==== 2016 Connecticut Republican State Convention ====
Candidate	Delegates	Percentage
Dan Carter	907	76.7%
August Wolf	123	10.4%
Jack Orchulli	20	1.7%
Not Present	132	11.2%

=== Electoral history ===
Year	Office	District	Democratic		Republican	
2010	Connecticut State Representative	2nd	Jason Bartlett (inc.)	48.4%	Dan Carter	51.6%
2012	Connecticut State Representative	2nd	Steven DeMoura	46.8%	Dan Carter (inc.)	53.2%
2014	Connecticut State Representative	2nd	Candace Fay	42.2%	Dan Carter (inc.)	57.8%
2016	U.S. Senate	Statewide	Richard Blumenthal (inc.)	63.2%	Dan Carter	34.6%
2023	Town of Bethel, First Selectman	Municipal	Rich Straiton (inc.)	36.8%	Dan Carter	63.2%

== Personal life ==
Carter was married to Cordy Puglio of Redding, Connecticut in 1994. They had two children. Carter divorced in 2002. He currently shares custody of his two children.

Carter married Jane Ann McBride of Long Island, New York in 2016. They currently reside in Bethel, Connecticut.

== Connecticut House of Representatives ==
=== Committee assignments ===
- Public Health
- Energy
- Banks
- Finance Revenue and Bonding
- General Law (Ranking)
- Education

== Bethel First Selectman ==
First Selectman-Elect Dan Carter was sworn in on Wednesday, February 8, 2023. First Selectman Carter's priorities will include: public safety, public engagement and dealing with the downtown section part of town. He won re-election in November 2023.

Connecticut House of Representatives
Preceded by Jason Bartlett	Member of the Connecticut House of Representatives from the 2nd district 2011–2017	Succeeded by William Duff
Party political offices
Preceded by Linda McMahon	Republican nominee for U.S. Senator from Connecticut (Class 3); 2016	Succeeded by Leora Levy
