= Connecticut's 27th House of Representatives district =

Connecticut legislative district

Connecticut's 27th State House of Representatives district
Representative
| Gary Turco; D |

Connecticut's 27th House of Representatives district elects one member of the Connecticut House of Representatives. It encompasses parts of Newington and has been represented by Democrat Gary Turco since 2019.

== List of representatives ==
List of Representatives from Connecticut's 27th State House District
| Representative | Party | Years | District home | Note |
|---|---|---|---|---|
| James J. Clynes | Democratic | 1967–1973 | Southington | Seat created |
| Elmer A. Mortensen | Republican | 1973–1975 | Newington | |
| Richard J. Balducci | Democratic | 1975–1993 | Newington | |
| Dominic Mazzoccoli | Republican | 1993–1999 | Newington | |
| Sandy Nafis | Democratic | 1999–2015 | Newington | |
| Gary Byron | Republican | 2015–2019 | Newington | |
| Gary Turco | Democratic | 2019– | Newington | |

== Recent elections ==
=== 2020 ===
2020 Connecticut State House of Representatives election, District 27
| Party | Candidate | Votes | % |
|---|---|---|---|
| Democratic | Gary Turco (incumbent) | 7,833 | 57.49 |
| Republican | Michael Camillo | 5,183 | 38.04 |
| Working Families | Gary Turco (incumbent) | 417 | 3.06 |
| Independent Party | Michael Camillo | 192 | 1.41 |
| Total votes | | 13,625 | 100.00 |
| Democratic hold | | | |

=== 2018 ===
2018 Connecticut House of Representatives election, District 27
| Party | Candidate | Votes | % |
|---|---|---|---|
| Democratic | Gary Turco | 5,491 | 50.3 |
| Republican | Gary Byron (incumbent) | 5,425 | 49.7 |
| Total votes | | 10,916 | 100.00 |
| Democratic gain from Republican | | | |

=== 2016 ===
2016 Connecticut House of Representatives election, District 27
| Party | Candidate | Votes | % |
|---|---|---|---|
| Republican | Gary Byron (incumbent) | 6,624 | 53.88 |
| Democratic | Joshua Shulman | 5,670 | 46.12 |
| Total votes | | 12,294 | 100.00 |
| Republican hold | | | |

=== 2014 ===
2014 Connecticut House of Representatives election, District 27
| Party | Candidate | Votes | % |
|---|---|---|---|
| Republican | Gary Byron | 4,715 | 53.0 |
| Democratic | Carol Anest | 3,943 | 44.3 |
| Working Families | Carol Anest | 246 | 2.8 |
| Total votes | | 8,904 | 100.00 |
| Republican gain from Democratic | | | |

=== 2012 ===
2012 Connecticut House of Representatives election, District 27
| Party | Candidate | Votes | % |
|---|---|---|---|
| Democratic | Sandy Nafis (Incumbent) | 7,168 | 65.2 |
| Republican | Ben Ancona | 3,834 | 34.8 |
| Total votes | | 11,002 | 100.00 |
| Democratic hold | | | |
