= Toni Lombardi =

American politician

Member-elect of the Connecticut House of Representatives from the 118th district
- Assuming office January 2027
- Succeeding: Frank Smith

Personal details
- Party: Democratic

Toni Lombardi is an American politician. A member of the Democratic Party, she is the member-elect for the 118th district of the Connecticut House of Representatives.
