= Connecticut's 112th House of Representatives district =

American legislative district

Connecticut's 112th State House of Representatives district
Representative
Tony Scott; R

Connecticut's 112th House of Representatives district elects one member of the Connecticut House of Representatives. It consists of the town of Monroe and parts of the towns of Easton and Trumbull. It has been represented by Republican Tony Scott since 2021.

== List of representatives ==
List of Representatives from Connecticut's 112th State House District
Representative	Party	Years	District home	Note
Morris Olmer	Democratic	1967–1971	New Haven	Seat created
Irving J. Stolberg	Democratic	1971–1973	New Haven	
George A. Johnson Jr.	Republican	1973–1975	Monroe	
Walter J. Henderson	Democratic	1975–1981	Monroe	
Adele Kusnitz	Republican	1981–1991	Monroe	
William Varese	Republican	1991–1999	Monroe	
Pat Shea	Republican	1999–2003	Monroe	
DebraLee Hovey	Republican	2003–2015	Monroe	
J.P. Sredzinski	Republican	2015–2021	Monroe	Resigned
Tony Scott	Republican	2021–	Monroe	Elected in special election

== Recent elections ==
=== 2022 ===
2022 Connecticut House of Representatives election, District 112
Party	Candidate	Votes	%
Republican	Tony Scott	6,700	59.9%
Democratic	Sheila Papps	4,484	40.1%
Total votes		11,184	100.00
Republican hold			

=== 2021 special ===
2021 Connecticut House of Representatives special elections, District 112
Party	Candidate	Votes	%
Republican	Tony Scott	2,248	53.2
Democratic	Nicholas Kapoor	1,948	46.1
Independent Party	William Furrier	31	0.7
Total votes		4,227	100.00
Republican hold			

=== 2020 ===
2020 Connecticut State House of Representatives election, District 112
Party	Candidate	Votes	%
Republican	J.P. Sredzinski (incumbent)	8,569	81.41
Independent Party	J.P. Sredzinski (incumbent)	1,957	18.59
Total votes		10,526	100.00
Republican hold			

=== 2018 ===
2018 Connecticut House of Representatives election, District 112
Party	Candidate	Votes	%
Republican	J.P. Sredzinski (Incumbent)	7,993	100.00
Total votes		7,993	100.00
Republican hold			

=== 2016 ===
2016 Connecticut House of Representatives election, District 112
Party	Candidate	Votes	%
Republican	J.P. Sredzinski (Incumbent)	9,753	100.00
Total votes		9,753	100.00
Republican hold			

=== 2014 ===
2014 Connecticut House of Representatives election, District 112
Party	Candidate	Votes	%
Republican	J.P. Sredzinski (Incumbent)	4,460	54.3
Democratic	Jen Aguilar	3,578	43.5
Independent Party	J.P. Sredzinski (Incumbent)	181	2.2
Total votes		8,219	100.00
Republican hold			

=== 2012 ===
2012 Connecticut House of Representatives election, District 112
Party	Candidate	Votes	%
Republican	DebraLee Hovey (Incumbent)	7,434	65.8
Democratic	Robert S. Dombroski	3,865	34.2
Total votes		11,299	100.00
Republican hold			
