= Matthew Ritter =

American politician (born 1983)

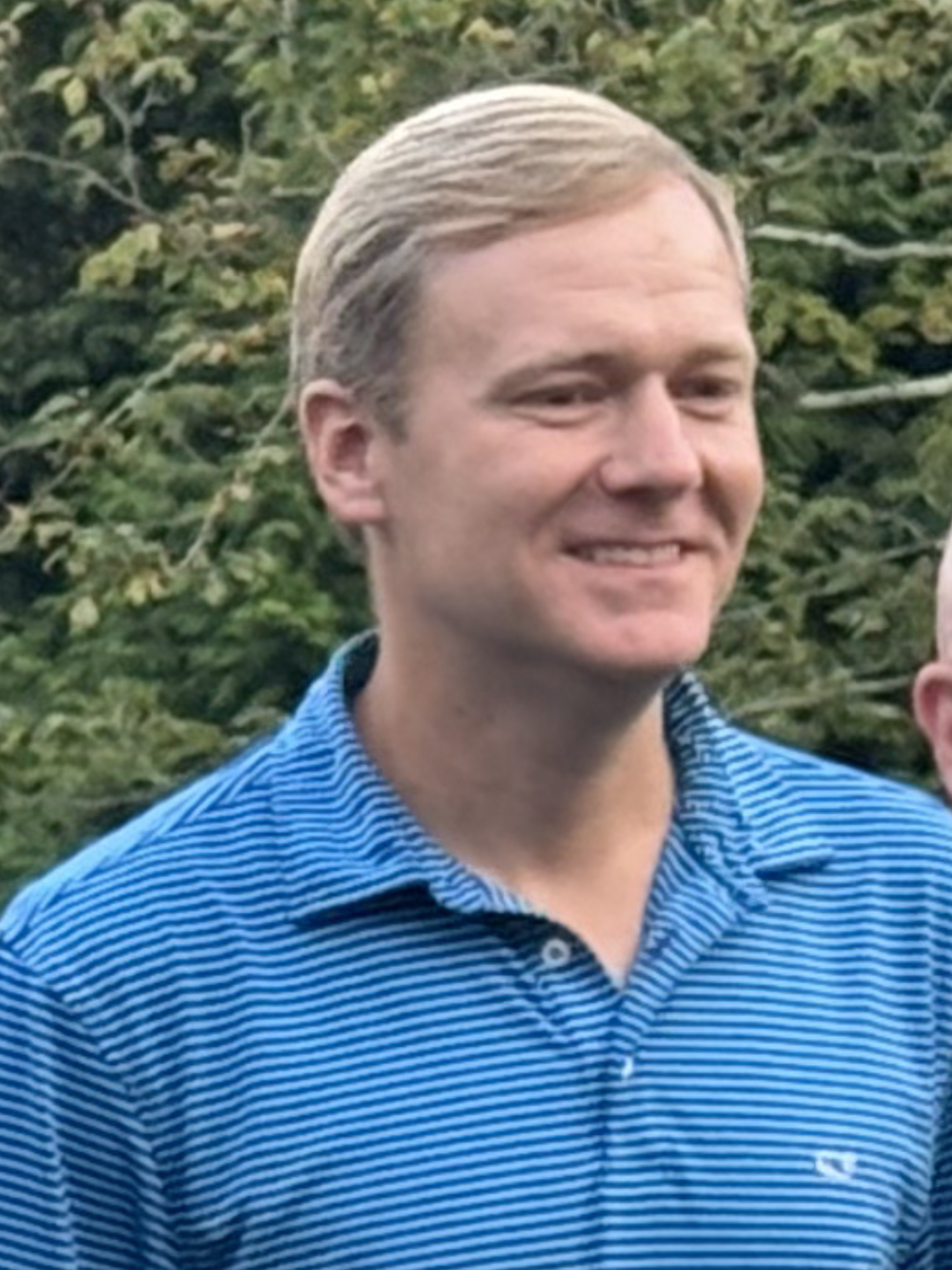

Speaker of the Connecticut House of Representatives
- Incumbent
- Assumed office January 6, 2021
- Preceded by: Joe Aresimowicz

Majority Leader of the Connecticut House of Representatives
- In office January 3, 2017 – January 6, 2021
- Preceded by: Joe Aresimowicz
- Succeeded by: Jason Rojas

Member of the Connecticut House of Representatives from the 1st district
- Incumbent
- Assumed office January 5, 2011
- Preceded by: Kenneth Green

Personal details
- Born: Matthew Delis Ritter; May 12, 1983 (age 43) Hartford, Connecticut, U.S.
- Party: Democratic
- Spouse: Marilyn Katz
- Parent(s): Thomas Ritter; Christine Keller
- Education: Colby College (BA); University of Connecticut, Hartford (JD)
- Website: State House website

Matthew Delis Ritter (born May 12, 1983) is an American attorney and politician serving as the 105th Speaker of the Connecticut House of Representatives since 2021. A member of the Democratic Party, he was first elected as the representative from the 1st District in 2010, and previously served as Majority Leader of the Connecticut House of Representatives from 2017 to 2021.

== Early life and education ==
Ritter was born in Hartford, Connecticut. His father, Thomas D. Ritter is a lawyer, lobbyist, and politician who served as the Speaker of the Connecticut House of Representatives from 1991 to 1999. His mother, Christine Keller, is a former Connecticut Supreme Court justice. Ritter's grandfather, George Ritter, also served in the legislature from 1969 to 1981.

Ritter attended Kingswood Oxford School for High School, then graduated from Colby College in 2004 with a major in Government. He attended the University of Connecticut School of Law, where he obtained his Juris Doctor degree in 2007.

In 2007, Ritter took a job with Hartford-based law firm Shipman and Goodwin, LLP. He is a partner specializing in public finance, municipal law and election law.

== Political career ==
In 2007, Ritter was elected to the Hartford City Council, where he chaired the Planning & Economic Development and Legislative Affairs committees. In 2010, Ritter challenged 16-year incumbent Kenneth Green in the Democratic primary for Connecticut's 1st Assembly District, defeating him by just two votes (1,153 to 1,151). In the general election, he easily defeated Republican Kenneth Lerman, and Connecticut for Lieberman candidate Emanuel L. Blake.

In 2017, Ritter became the Majority Leader of the Connecticut House of Representatives, and was elected Speaker of the House in 2021.

== Electoral history ==
=== 2010 ===
Democratic primary: Connecticut's 1st House of Representatives district election, 2010
Party	Candidate	Votes	%
Democratic	Matthew Ritter	1,153	50.04%
Democratic	Kenneth Green	1,151	49.96%
Total votes		2,304	100%

Connecticut's 1st House of Representatives district election, 2010
Party	Candidate	Votes	%
Democratic	Matthew Ritter	4,628	90.23%
Republican	Kenneth Lerman	398	7.76%
Connecticut for Lieberman	Emanuel L. Blake	56	1.09%
Independent	Emanuel L. Blake	47	0.92%
Total	Emanuel L. Blake	103	2.01%
Total votes		5,129	100%

=== 2012 ===
Connecticut's 1st House of Representatives district election, 2012
Party	Candidate	Votes	%
Democratic	Matthew Ritter	6,038	93.60%
Republican	Kenneth Lerman	413	6.40%
Total votes		3,894	100%

=== 2014 ===
Connecticut's 1st House of Representatives district election, 2014
Party	Candidate	Votes	%
Democratic	Matthew Ritter	3,566	91.58%
Republican	Kenneth Lerman	328	8.42%
Total votes		3,894	100%

=== 2016 ===
Connecticut's 1st House of Representatives district election, 2016
Party	Candidate	Votes	%
Democratic	Matthew Ritter	5,662	92.05%
Republican	Kenneth Lerman	489	7.95%
Total votes		6,151	100%

=== 2018 ===
Connecticut's 1st House of Representatives district election, 2018
Party	Candidate	Votes	%
Democratic	Matthew Ritter	4,419	100%
Total votes		4,419	100%

=== 2020 ===
Connecticut's 1st House of Representatives district election, 2020
Party	Candidate	Votes	%
Democratic	Matthew Ritter	5,198	91.77%
Independent	Mark Greenstein	290	5.12%
Independent	Daniel Piper	176	3.11%
Total votes		5,664	100%

=== 2022 ===
Connecticut's 1st House of Representatives district election, 2022
Party	Candidate	Votes	%
Democratic	Matthew Ritter	3,061	100%
Total votes		3,061	100%

=== 2024 ===
Connecticut's 1st House of Representatives district election, 2024
Party	Candidate	Votes	%
Democratic	Matthew Ritter	4,961	100%
Total votes		4,961	100%

Connecticut House of Representatives
Preceded by Joe Aresimowicz	Majority Leader of the Connecticut House of Representatives; 3 January 2017 – 6 January 2021	Succeeded by Jason Rojas
Political offices
Preceded by Joe Aresimowicz	Speaker of the Connecticut House of Representatives; 6 January 2021 – present	Incumbent
