= Howard Scipio =

American politician (1921–2001)

Member of the Connecticut House of Representatives from the 93rd district
- In office January 6, 1993 – April 30, 2001
- Preceded by: Irving J. Stolberg
- Succeeded by: Toni Walker

Personal details
- Born: December 2, 1921 Bridgeport, Connecticut, U.S.
- Died: April 30, 2001 (aged 79) New Haven, Connecticut, U.S.
- Party: Democratic

Howard Scipio (December 2, 1921 – April 30, 2001) was an American politician who served in the Connecticut House of Representatives from the 93rd district from 1993 until his death in 2001.

Scipio died of leukemia on April 30, 2001, in New Haven, Connecticut at the age of 79.
