= Connecticut's 2nd House of Representatives district =

American legislative district

Connecticut's 2nd State House of Representatives district
Representative
Raghib Allie-Brennan; D

Connecticut's 2nd House of Representatives district elects one member of the Connecticut House of Representatives. Its current representative is Raghib Allie-Brennan. The district consists of parts of the towns of Bethel, Redding, Newtown, and part of the city of Danbury.

Prior to 2002, the 2nd District was one of six districts located entirely within the city of Hartford, but its old boundaries were abolished due to population decline in Hartford and the district was added to suburban Fairfield County, an area of much faster growth.

== List of representatives ==
List of Representatives from Connecticut's 2nd State House District
Representative	Party	Years	District home	Note
John P. Carragher	Democratic	1967–1969	Hartford	Seat created
Joseph R. Adam	Democratic	1969–1971	Hartford	
Robert J. Carragher	Democratic	1971–1973	Hartford	
Nicholas M. Motto	Democratic	1973–1979	Hartford	
Richard P. Lawlor	Democratic	1979–1981	Hartford	
Arthur A. Brouillet Jr.	Democratic	1981–1983	Hartford	
Thomas D. Ritter	Democratic	1983–1999	Hartford	
Barnaby Horton	Democratic	1999–2003	Hartford	
Hank Bielawa	Republican	2003–2007	Redding	
Jason Bartlett	Democratic	2007–2011	Bethel	
Dan E. Carter	Republican	2011–2017	Bethel	
William Duff	Republican	2017–2019	Bethel	
Raghib Allie-Brennan	Democratic	2019–	Bethel	

== Recent elections ==
=== 2022 ===
2022 Connecticut State House of Representatives election, 2nd District
Party	Candidate	Votes	%
Democratic	Raghib Allie-Brennan (incumbent)	4,818	52.05
Republican	Jenn Lewis	4,118	44.49
Working Families	Raghib Allie-Brennan (incumbent)	190	2.05
Independent Party	Jenn Lewis	130	1.40
Total votes		9,256	100.00
Democratic hold			

=== 2008 ===
State Election 2008: House District 2
Party	Candidate	Votes	%	±%
Democratic	Jason Bartlett	5,966	54.3	+0.4
Republican	Melanie O'Brien	4,603	41.9	−1.2
Independent	Melanie O'Brien	418	3.8	
Majority		945	8.6	+0.9
Turnout		10,987		
Democratic hold		Swing	+0.4	

State Election 2006: House District 2
Party	Candidate	Votes	%	±%
Democratic	Jason Bartlett	4,112	53.9	+4.3
Republican	Jim Gallagher	3,294	43.1	−5.2
Independent	Jim Gallagher	230	3.0	
Majority		588	7.7	+6.9
Turnout		7,636		
Democratic gain from Republican		Swing	+4.3	

State Election 2004: House District 2
Party	Candidate	Votes	%	±%
Democratic	Jason Bartlett	5,234	49.6	+4.4
Republican	Hank Bielawa	5,102	48.3	−3.7
Independent	Hank Bielawa	219	2.1	
Majority		87	0.8	−6.0
Turnout		10,555		
Republican hold		Swing	-3.0	

State Election 2002: House District 2
Party	Candidate	Votes	%	±%
Republican	Hank Bielawa	3,563	52.0	
Democratic	Jason Bartlett	3,100	45.2	
Independent	Robert Fand	192	2.8	
Majority		463	6.8	
Turnout		6,855		
Republican hold		Swing		

=== Elections before boundary change ===
State Election 2000: House District 2
Party	Candidate	Votes	%	±%
Democratic	Barnaby W. Horton	3,025	100.0	+12.0
Majority		8,539	100.0	+24.0
Turnout		8,539		
Democratic hold		Swing	+12.0	

State Election 1998: House District 2
Party	Candidate	Votes	%	±%
Democratic	Barnaby W. Horton	2,305	88.0	
Republican	Peter F. Brush	314	12.0	
Majority		1,991	76.0	
Turnout		2,619		
Democratic hold		Swing		
