= Connecticut's 84th House of Representatives district =

American legislative district

Connecticut's 84th State House of Representatives district
Representative
Hilda Santiago; D

Connecticut's 84th House of Representatives district elects one member of the Connecticut House of Representatives. It encompasses parts of Meriden and has been represented by Democrat Hilda Santiago since 2013.

== List of representatives ==
List of Representatives from Connecticut's 84th State House District
Representative	Party	Years	District home	Note
Thomas C. Salamone	Democratic	1967–1971	Wolcott	Seat created
William F. Ryan	Democratic	1971–1973	Terryville	
Daniel W. Brunski	Republican	1973–1975	Meriden	
Benjamin N. DeZinno Jr.	Democratic	1975–1993	Meriden	
Christopher G. Donovan	Democratic	1993–2013	Meriden	
Hilda Santiago	Democratic	2013–	Meriden	

== Recent elections ==
=== 2024 ===
2018 Connecticut House of Representatives election, District 84
Party	Candidate	Votes	%
Democratic	Hilda Santiago (Incumbent)	4,074	100.0
Total votes		4,074	100.0
Democratic hold			

=== 2022 ===
2018 Connecticut House of Representatives election, District 84
Party	Candidate	Votes	%
Democratic	Hilda Santiago (Incumbent)	2,392	100.0
Total votes		2,392	100.0
Democratic hold			

=== 2020 ===
2020 Connecticut State House of Representatives election, District 84
Party	Candidate	Votes	%
Democratic	Hilda Santiago (incumbent)	4,108	63.85
Republican	Richard Cordero	2,022	31.43
Working Families	Hilda Santiago (incumbent)	304	4.72
Total votes		6,434	100.00
Democratic hold			

=== 2018 ===
2018 Connecticut House of Representatives election, District 84
Party	Candidate	Votes	%
Democratic	Hilda Santiago (Incumbent)	3,513	100.0
Total votes		3,513	100.0
Democratic hold			

=== 2016 ===
2016 Connecticut House of Representatives election, District 84
Party	Candidate	Votes	%
Democratic	Hilda Santiago (Incumbent)	3,513	85.91
Green	Matt Went	678	14.09
Total votes		4,813	100.0
Democratic hold			

=== 2014 ===
2014 Connecticut House of Representatives election, District 84
Party	Candidate	Votes	%
Democratic	Hilda Santiago (Incumbent)	2,382	85.7
Green	Matt Went	393	14.3
Total votes		2,780	100.0
Democratic hold			

=== 2012 ===
2012 Connecticut House of Representatives election, District 84
Party	Candidate	Votes	%
Democratic	Hilda Santiago	3,952	72.4
Republican	David Swedock	1,279	23.4
Green	Matt Went	139	2.5
We The People	Damien DeJesus	85	1.6
Total votes		2,780	100.0
Democratic hold			
