= Thomas C. Salamone =

American politician and businessman (1927–2014)

Member of the Connecticut House of Representatives from Wolcott
- In office 1963–1967
- Preceded by: William T. Moriarty; Frank Corrigan
- Succeeded by: Seat eliminated

Member of the Connecticut House of Representatives from the 84th district
- In office 1967–1971
- Preceded by: Seat created
- Succeeded by: William F. Ryan

Personal details
- Born: March 28, 1927 Waterbury, Connecticut, U.S.
- Died: April 15, 2014 (aged 87)
- Party: Democratic
- Education: Post University

Military service
- Branch/service: United States Navy

Thomas C. Salamone (March 28, 1927 – April 15, 2014) was an American politician and businessman.

Born in Waterbury, Connecticut, Salamone served in the United States Navy during World War II and went to Post University. He owned Salamone Insurance Agency. Salamone served in the Connecticut House of Representatives, from Wolcott, Connecticut, as a Democrat, from 1963 until 1971.
