= Kenneth Green =

American politician

Kenneth P. Green

Member of the Connecticut House of Representatives from the 1st district
- In office January 4, 1995 – January 5, 2011
- Preceded by: Eric D. Coleman
- Succeeded by: Matthew Ritter

Personal details
- Born: Hartford, Connecticut, U.S.
- Party: Democratic
- Education: Hampshire College and University of Connecticut

Kenneth P. Green is a social worker and Democratic and Independent politician from Hartford, Connecticut. He served as a Representative to the Connecticut House of Representatives for the 1st district.

== Early life ==
Green was born in Hartford, Connecticut. He has a BA in Social Science from Hampshire College and earned an MA in Social Work at the University of Connecticut School of Social Work in 1979.

== Political career ==
Green represented Connecticut's 1st assembly district from 1994 to 2010. During his legislative career, he chaired Connecticut's Legislative Black and Puerto Rican Caucus. In 2010, Green lost the Democratic primary to challenger Matthew Ritter; 1,153 votes to 1,151 votes. In 2017, Green ran as an Independent in a three way race for Connecticut House of Representatives District 7 against Democrat Rickey Pinckney Sr. and Working Families Party candidate Joshua Malik Hall.
