= Eloise Green =

American politician (1912–1988)

Member of the Connecticut House of Representatives from the 69th district
- In office 1973–1979
- Preceded by: Rufus C. Rose
- Succeeded by: William F. Rogers III

Member of the Connecticut House of Representatives from the 93rd district
- In office 1967–1973
- Preceded by: Seat established
- Succeeded by: Irving J. Stolberg

Member of the Connecticut House of Representatives from Southbury
- In office 1961–1967 Serving with Sidney S. Platt (1961–1963); Robert K. Mitchell (1963–1967)
- Preceded by: Sidney S. Platt
- Succeeded by: Seat eliminated

Personal details
- Born: Eloise Bosworth; March 15, 1912 Buffalo, New York, U.S.
- Died: August 9, 1988 (aged 76) Southbury, Connecticut, U.S.
- Party: Republican
- Spouse: James Green Jr.
- Children: 2

Eloise Bosworth Green (March 15, 1912 – August 9, 1988) was an American politician who served in the Connecticut House of Representatives from 1961 to 1979. A Republican, Green represented the town of Southbury from 1961 to 1967, the 93rd district from 1967 to 1973, and the 69th district from 1973 to 1979.

== Personal life ==
Eloise Bosworth was born on March 15, 1912, in Buffalo, New York, to Arthur H. and Alice Bosworth. She married James Green Jr. on August 20, 1932, and later moved to Southbury, Connecticut. She had two children.

== Political career ==
A Republican, Green was first elected to the Connecticut House of Representatives in 1960 to represent the town of Southbury. It was the first election in which Southbury qualified to elect two representatives to the House, and she served alongside Sidney S. Platt from 1961 to 1963 and Robert K. Mitchell from 1963 to 1967.

In 1966, Connecticut redistricted, eliminating its single-town districts. Green ran for reelection in the newly created 93rd district and served three terms. In 1972, Connecticut again redistricted, and Green was elected to the 69th district, where she served three more terms. She did not run for reelection in 1978, and William F. Rogers III succeeded her in 1979.

== Death ==
Green died on August 9, 1988, at her home in Southbury. She was 76.
