= Hilda Santiago =

Puerto Rican politician

Member of the Connecticut House of Representatives from the 84th district
- Incumbent
- Assumed office January 9, 2013
- Preceded by: Christopher G. Donovan

Personal details
- Born: May 19, 1955 (age 71) Naranjito, Puerto Rico
- Party: Democratic
- Education: Southern Connecticut State University (B.Ed.)

Hilda Santiago (born May 19, 1955) is an American politician who has served in the Connecticut House of Representatives from the 84th district since 2013. She graduated from O.H. Platt High School in Meriden, Connecticut. She obtained a Bachelor of Science in Secondary Education from Southern Connecticut State University, majoring in History and Latin American Studies.
