= Gary Byron =

American politician

Member of the Connecticut House of Representatives from the 27th district
- In office January 7, 2015 – January 9, 2019
- Preceded by: Sandy Nafis
- Succeeded by: Gary Turco

Personal details
- Born: March 26, 1970 (age 56)
- Party: Republican
- Spouse: Sharon (Riedel)
- Education: Central Connecticut State University; Middlesex Community College

Gary Byron (born March 26, 1970) is the current radio host of "Mornings With Gary Byron," and former American politician who served in the Connecticut House of Representatives from the 27th district from 2015 to 2019. In 2016 Gary Byron was awarded Legislator of the Year by the Northeast Mental Health District for his work with the autism community and those with intellectual and developmental disabilities.

== Career ==
=== Connecticut House of Representatives ===
==== Committees ====
- Aging Committee (ranking member)
- Environment Committee
- Housing Committee
- Human Services Committee

=== Radio ===
In 2019 he was the morning co-host with Brad Davis on WDRC's Talk of Connecticut until taking over as the full time host in 2020. The rebranded show is titled Mornings With Gary Byron. This coincided with his additional position as weekend personality on sister station 102.9 The Whale. In 2023 Gary Byron was voted third most popular Connecticut radio personality in a Hartford Courant readers poll. In 2024 he was voted first runner-up in the same poll.
