= Gary Turco =

American politician

Member of the Connecticut House of Representatives from the 27th district
- Incumbent
- Assumed office January 9, 2019
- Preceded by: Gary Byron

Personal details
- Born: May 30, 1981 (age 45)
- Party: Democratic
- Education: Sacred Heart University (BA); Central Connecticut State University (MA)

Gary Turco (born May 30, 1981) is an American politician who has served in the Connecticut House of Representatives from the 27th district since 2019.
