= J.P. Sredzinski =

American politician

Member of the Connecticut House of Representatives from the 112th district
- In office 2015 – February 17, 2021
- Preceded by: DebraLee Hovey
- Succeeded by: Tony Scott

Personal details
- Born: John Sredzinski
- Party: Republican
- Education: University of Connecticut

John "J.P." Sredzinski is an American politician who served in the Connecticut House of Representatives from 2015 to 2021, representing the 112th district as a Republican.

== Biography ==
Sredzinski gained a degree in Urban Studies from the University of Connecticut in 2003. Sredzinski was a Public Safety Dispatch Supervisor for Stratford, Connecticut.

Sredzinski first won the 2014 election for the 112th district of the Connecticut House of Representatives. In the 2015 legislative session, Sredzinski was assigned to the Commerce and Public Safety and Security Committees.

In the 2017 legislative session, Sredzinski was assigned to the Appropriations Committee, Energy and Technology Committee, and as a ranking member of the Public Safety and Security Committee. In the 2019–2020 legislative session, Sredzinski was assigned to the Higher Education and Employment Committee, Human Services Committee, and continued as a ranking member of the Public Safety and Security Committee.

On February 17, 2021, Sredzinski resigned from the Connecticut House of Representatives. In his letter of resignation, Sredzinski cited needing to prioritize the time he has for his career and family, and the differences in politics since 2004 as his reason for resigning. Tony Scott won the special election for Sredzinski's Connecticut House of Representatives seat.
