= Oliver Henry Perry =

American politician (1815–1882)

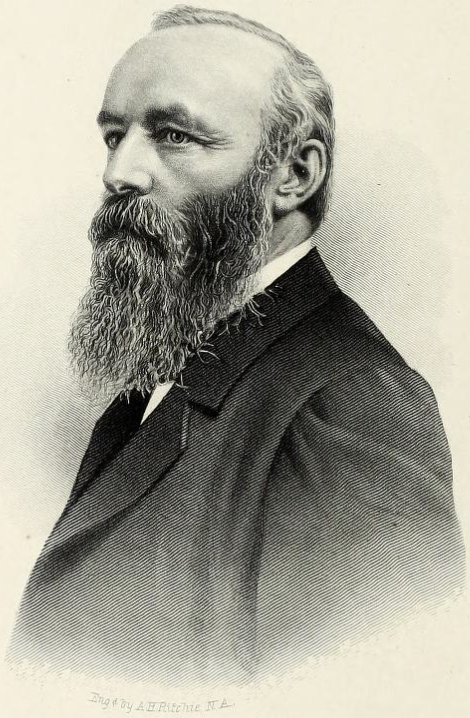
- Portrait of Perry in 1881 publication

Speaker of the Connecticut House of Representatives
- In office 1859–1860
- Preceded by: Alfred A. Burnham
- Succeeded by: Augustus Brandegee

Secretary of the State of Connecticut
- In office 1854–1855
- Preceded by: John Perkins Cushing Mather
- Succeeded by: Nehemiah D. Sperry

Member of the Connecticut House of Representatives from Fairfield
- In office 1847–1849, 1853, 1857, 1859–1860, 1864

Personal details
- Born: February 21, 1815 Southport, Connecticut, U.S.
- Died: March 27, 1882 (aged 67) Richmond, Virginia, U.S.
- Party: Whig; Republican
- Spouse: Harriette E. Hoyt (m. 1846)
- Children: 4, including John
- Education: Yale Law School
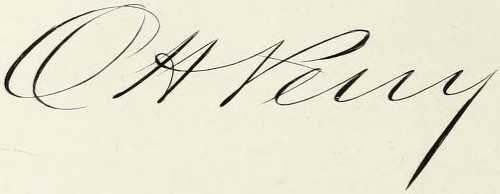
- Signature

Oliver Henry Perry (February 21, 1815 – March 27, 1882) was an American politician from Connecticut. He served as the Secretary of the State of Connecticut in 1854 and as a member of the Connecticut House of Representatives in 1847–1849, 1853, 1857, 1859–1860, and 1864. He was the speaker of the Connecticut House of Representatives from 1859 to 1860.

== Early life ==
Oliver Henry Perry was born on February 21, 1815, at Mill River (later Southport) in Fairfield, Connecticut, to Elizabeth Burr (née Sturges) and Walter Perry. His father was a merchant and ship owner at Mill River. Perry was the youngest of 10 children. He attended Fairfield Academy and entered Yale College at the age of fifteen, in 1830. He left Yale in his first year and did not return due to ill health. He returned to study law at Yale Law School from 1838 to 1841 and was admitted to the bar on December 8, 1841, in New Haven. He was a member of Skull and Bones.

== Career ==
Perry served on committees in Southport that helped design and erect the public school in 1851–1852, the Southport Savings Bank in 1864–1865 and the new Congregational Church in 1875. In 1878, Perry was chosen as an officer of the church. He was one of the projectors and original trustees of the Oak Lawn Cemetery Association in 1865. He served as a director of the Southport Savings Bank during its original charter and after its organization as a National Bank. He helped secure the charter of Southport Savings Bank in 1854 and served as treasurer starting in 1865. He served as warden of the Southport borough from 1846 to 1854.

Perry served as quartermaster of the Fourth Brigade of the Connecticut Infantry in 1836. He served as a member of the Connecticut House of Representatives from 1847 to 1849, 1853, 1857, 1859–1860 and 1864. He served as Speaker of the Connecticut House of Representatives in 1859 and 1860. Perry was an unsuccessful Whig candidate for state senator in 1852 and Republican candidate for lieutenant governor in 1867. Perry was elected as Secretary of the State of Connecticut in 1854. Perry served as one of the Connecticut commissioners for the survey and settlement of the state boundary line between New York and Connecticut in 1859–1860.

== Personal life ==
Perry married Harriette E. Hoyt, daughter of Eli T. Hoyt of Danbury, on September 9, 1846. They had four children, John H., Henry H., Winthrop H. and Hattie. H. His son John H. also served in the Connecticut House of Representatives.

Perry died on March 27, 1882, in Richmond, Virginia.

== Awards and honors ==
In 1875, Perry received a Master of Arts degree from Yale University.

Political offices
Preceded by John Perkins Cushing Mather	Secretary of the State of Connecticut; 1854–1855	Succeeded by Nehemiah D. Sperry
