= Barnaby Horton =

American politician

Member of the Connecticut House of Representatives from the 2nd district
- In office January 6, 1999 – January 8, 2003
- Preceded by: Thomas D. Ritter
- Succeeded by: Hank Bielawa

Personal details
- Born: December 9, 1968 (age 57) Hartford, Connecticut, U.S.
- Party: Democratic

Barnaby Horton (born December 9, 1968) is an American politician who served in the Connecticut House of Representatives from the 2nd district from 1999 to 2003.
