= Connecticut's 118th House of Representatives district =

American legislative district

Connecticut's 118th State House of Representatives district
Representative
Frank Smith; D

Connecticut's 118th House of Representatives district elects one member of the Connecticut House of Representatives. It encompasses parts of Milford and has been represented by Democrat Frank Smith since 2021.

== List of representatives ==
List of Representatives from Connecticut's 118th State House District
Representative	Party	Years	District home	Note
Carl R. Ajello	Democratic	1967–1973	Ansonia	Seat created
Will Mahoney	Republican	1973–1975	Milford	
Charles D. Campbell	Democratic	1975–1977	Milford	
Will Mahoney	Republican	1977–1979	Milford	
Timothy J. Casey	Republican	1979–1991	Milford	
James Amann	Democratic	1991–2009	Milford	
Barbara Lambert	Democratic	2009–2011	Milford	
Kim Rose	Democratic	2011–2021	Milford	
Frank Smith	Democratic	2021–	Milford	

== Recent elections ==
=== 2020 ===
2020 Connecticut State House of Representatives election, District 118
Party	Candidate	Votes	%
Democratic	Frank Smith	6,908	52.83
Republican	Erik A. Smith	5,538	42.35
Independent Party	Erik A. Smith	338	2.58
Working Families	Frank Smith	292	2.23
Total votes		13,076	100.00
Democratic hold			

=== 2018 ===
2018 Connecticut House of Representatives election, District 118
Party	Candidate	Votes	%
Democratic	Kim Rose (Incumbent)	5,696	56.3
Republican	Connie Jagodzinski	4,421	43.7
Total votes		10,117	100.00
Democratic hold			

=== 2016 ===
2016 Connecticut House of Representatives election, District 118
Party	Candidate	Votes	%
Democratic	Kim Rose (Incumbent)	6,063	54.24
Republican	Rick Varrone	5,115	46.76
Total votes		11,178	100.00
Democratic hold			

=== 2014 ===
2014 Connecticut House of Representatives election, District 118
Party	Candidate	Votes	%
Democratic	Kim Rose (Incumbent)	3,672	50.1
Republican	Ray Vitali	3,159	43.1
Independent Party	Ray Vitali	258	3.5
Working Families	Kim Rose (Incumbent)	237	3.2
Total votes		11,178	100.00
Democratic hold			

=== 2012 ===
2012 Connecticut House of Representatives election, District 118
Party	Candidate	Votes	%
Democratic	Kim Rose (Incumbent)	6,072	63.4
Republican	Michael S. Casey	3,503	36.6
Total votes		9,575	100.00
Democratic hold			
