= Connecticut's 93rd House of Representatives district =

American legislative district

Connecticut's 93rd State House of Representatives district
Representative
| Toni Walker; D |

Connecticut's 93rd House of Representatives district elects one member of the Connecticut House of Representatives. It encompasses parts of New Haven and has been represented by Democrat Toni Walker since 2001.

== List of representatives ==
List of representatives from Connecticut's 93rd State House district
| Representative | Party | Years | District home | Note |
|---|---|---|---|---|
| Eloise Green | Republican | 1967–1973 | Southbury | Seat created |
| Irving J. Stolberg | Democratic | 1973–1993 | New Haven | |
| Howard Scipio | Democratic | 1993–2001 | New Haven | Died in office |
| Toni Walker | Democratic | 2001– | New Haven | Elected in special election |

== Recent elections ==
=== 2020 ===
2020 Connecticut State House of Representatives election, District 93
| Party | Candidate | Votes | % |
|---|---|---|---|
| Democratic | Toni Walker (incumbent) | 5,816 | 100.00 |
| Democratic hold | | | |

=== 2018 ===
2018 Connecticut House of Representatives election, District 93
| Party | Candidate | Votes | % |
|---|---|---|---|
| Democratic | Toni Walker (Incumbent) | 4,782 | 93.9 |
| Republican | Grant Richardson | 311 | 6.1 |
| Total votes | | 5,093 | 100.00 |
| Democratic hold | | | |

=== 2016 ===
2016 Connecticut House of Representatives election, District 93
| Party | Candidate | Votes | % |
|---|---|---|---|
| Democratic | Toni Walker (Incumbent) | 6,159 | 94.61 |
| Republican | Douglas Losty | 351 | 5.39 |
| Total votes | | 6,510 | 100.00 |
| Democratic hold | | | |

=== 2014 ===
2014 Connecticut House of Representatives election, District 93
| Party | Candidate | Votes | % |
|---|---|---|---|
| Democratic | Toni Walker (Incumbent) | 3,774 | 100.00 |
| Total votes | | 3,744 | 100.00 |
| Democratic hold | | | |

=== 2012 ===
2012 Connecticut House of Representatives election, District 93
| Party | Candidate | Votes | % |
|---|---|---|---|
| Democratic | Toni Walker (Incumbent) | 6,547 | 100.00 |
| Total votes | | 6,547 | 100.00 |
| Democratic hold | | | |
