= Bethel High School (Connecticut) =

Coordinates: 41.3781°N 73.3939°W

Location
- 300 Whittlesey Drive; Bethel, Connecticut 06801; United States

Information
- Type: Public school
- Established: 1939 (87 years ago)
- CEEB code: 070025
- Principal: Christopher Troetti
- Teaching staff: 83.90 (FTE)
- Grades: 9–12
- Enrollment: 1,083 (2023-2024)
- Student to teacher ratio: 12.91
- Schedule: 7:30-2:10
- Colors: Maroon and White
- Mascot: Wildcat
- Newspaper: Wildcat Word
- Website: https://bhs.bethel.k12.ct.us/

Bethel High School is a public secondary school located in the town of Bethel, Connecticut, approximately 60 miles (97 km) north of New York City. Founded in 1939, its previous location was the present-day Municipal Center (1 School Street) until it was moved to its current location at 300 Whittlesey Drive. The school is located in an educational park along with the elementary and middle schools of the town.

Eleanor Roosevelt spoke at the graduation of the Class of 1954. Since speaking to the graduating class of only 52 graduates, Bethel High School has expanded. As of the 2023-2024 school year, it had an enrollment of 1,083 students.

Bethel High School offers a honors and Advanced Placement (AP) Classes such as AP Calculus. It has an AP enrollment rate of 52% and a graduation rate of 96%.

== Extracurricular activities ==
=== Athletics ===
- Fall:
  - Football
  - Volleyball
  - Field hockey
  - Cross Country
  - Soccer
  - Golf
  - Girls Swimming
- Winter:
  - Track and Field
  - Wrestling
  - Basketball
  - Boys Swimming
- Spring:
  - Tennis
  - Softball
  - Track
  - Baseball
  - Lacrosse

=== Other extracurricular activities ===
- Bethel High School is home to an award-winning Junior Reserve Officers' Training Corps (NJROTC) unit.
- Bethel High School's Mock Trial Team won the Connecticut State Championship in 2008.
- Bethel High School is home to the multi-award-winning Marching Wildcats. The Marching Wildcats are USBANDS States and Nationals winners.
- Bethel High School is home to a state medaling debate team and competes in the FCML (Fairfield Country Math Team)

== Notable alumni ==
- Raghib Allie-Brennan, member of the Connecticut House of Representatives
- Matt Barnes, professional baseball player, pitcher for the Boston Red Sox
- Connor Grillo, public speaker, front office for the New York Yankees and Savannah Bananas
- Dan Cramer, mixed martial artist, former UFC Fighter
- Seth Grahame-Smith, screenwriter, producer and author
- Thurston Moore, co-founder of Sonic Youth
- Meg Ryan, actress
- Peter Selgin, author
- Greg Sutton, soccer player
