= Kim Rose =

American politician

Member of the Connecticut House of Representatives from the 118th district
- In office January 6, 2011 – January 6, 2021
- Preceded by: Barbara Lambert
- Succeeded by: Frank Smith

Planning & Zoning Board
- In office 2007–2011
- Constituency: 3rd District

Personal details
- Party: Democratic
- Website: Official legislative website

Kim Rose is an American Democratic politician who served in the Connecticut House of Representatives from 2011 to 2021. Rose represented the 118th district, which encompasses parts Milford, Connecticut, and the village of Devon. Previously serving as Vice-Chair of the local Planning & Zoning Board, Rose was elected as State Representative in 2010.

In the Connecticut House of Representatives, Rose served as Assistant Majority Whip, Vice Chairwoman of the Housing Committee, and on the Veterans' Affairs Committee and the Internship Committee. She was elected in 2015 to co-chair the Bipartisan Women's Caucus.

In 2012 Rose handily won against her Republican opponent and was re-elected again in 2014.

In 2016, Kim Rose was reelected to her 4th term, garnering 57.6% of the vote to beat out her opponent, Rick Varrone.
