= Ralph E. Van Norstrand =

American politician (1937–1995)

Ralph E. Van Norstrand (January 13, 1937 — January 1, 1995) was an American politician and lawyer. A Republican member of the Connecticut General Assembly from 1976 to 1987, he served as the Speaker of the Connecticut House of Representatives from 1985 to 1987.

== Life and career ==
Born in Westfield, Massachusetts, Norstrand was the son of Ralph Ellis and Charlotte Hennessey Van Norstrand. He earned degrees from the University of Connecticut and Yale Law School (1961). He began his political career as a councilman in the city of Darien, Connecticut where he also served as a trustee of the Darien Library. In 1976 he won a special election for a seat representing Darien in the Connecticut House of Representatives.

Norstrand was minority leader of the Connecticut General Assembly (CGA) from 1979 through 1985, and speaker of the CGA from 1985 through 1987. He was denied renomination by his party in 1986, and after completing his term in 1987 no longer served in elected office. He worked as a lawyer for the Norwalk, Connecticut law firm Slavitt, Connery & Vardamis after leaving politics.

Norstrand died on New Year's Day 1995 at the age of 57 in Darien.

Connecticut House of Representatives
Preceded by Gennaro W. Frate	Member of the Connecticut House of Representatives from the 141st district 1976–1989	Succeeded by Reginald L. Jones, Jr.
Political offices
Preceded by Irving J. Stolberg	Speaker of the Connecticut House of Representatives; 1985–1987	Succeeded by Irving J. Stolberg
