= Frank Smith (Connecticut politician) =

American politician (born 1954)

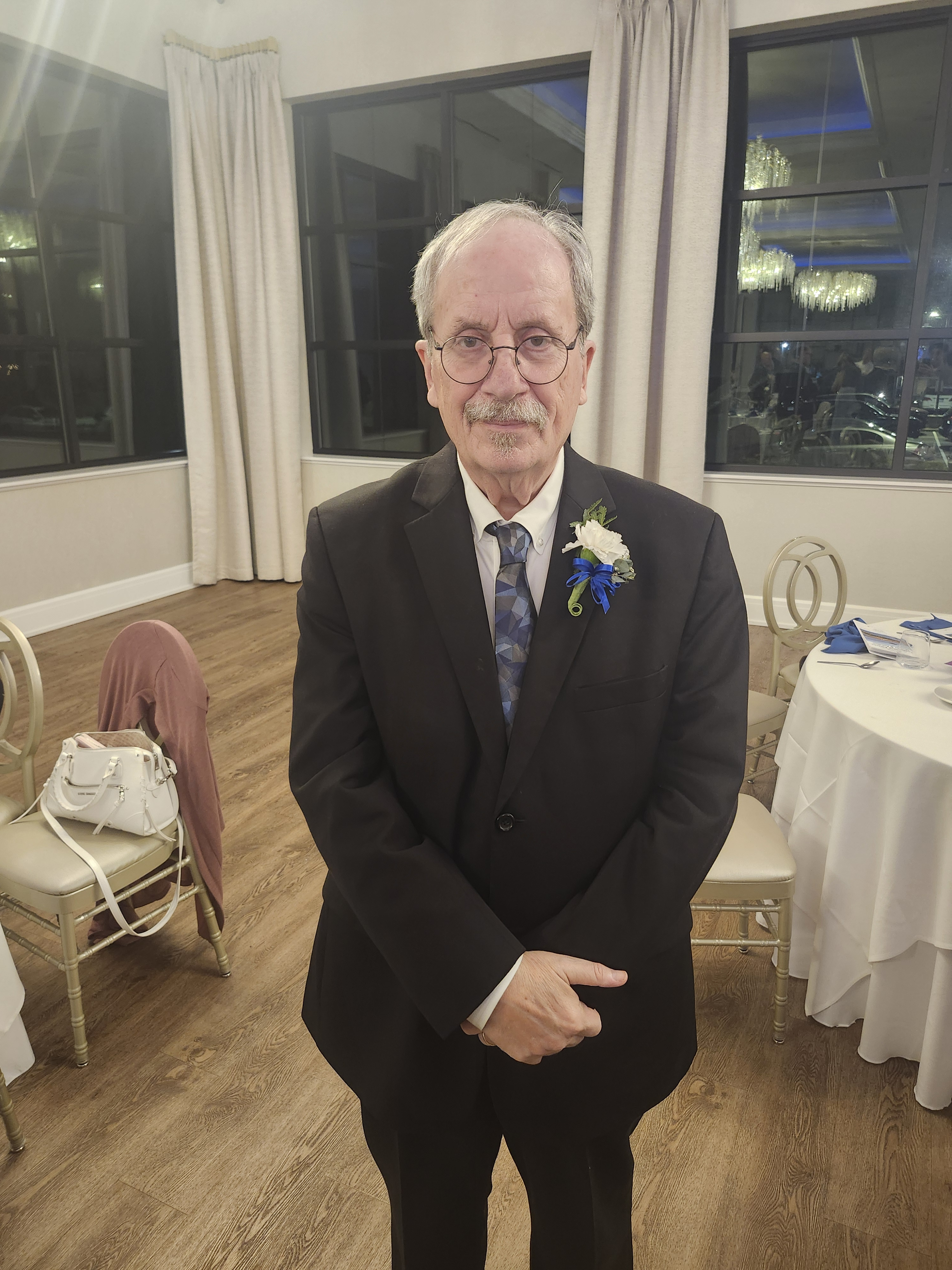
- Smith in 2026

Member of the Connecticut House of Representatives from the 118th district
- Incumbent
- Assumed office January 6, 2021
- Preceded by: Kim Rose
- Succeeded by: Toni Lombardi (elect)

Personal details
- Born: 1954 (age 71–72)
- Party: Democratic
- Education: Southern Connecticut State University (BA)

Frank J. Smith (born 1954) is an American Democratic Party politician currently serving as a member of the Connecticut House of Representatives from the 118th district, which includes part of the city of Milford since 2021. Smith was first elected to the seat in 2020, defeating Republican Erik Smith. Smith currently serves as vice chair of the House's Housing Committee. He is also a member of the House Education and Environment Committees.
