= John Hoyt Perry =

American politician (1848–1928)

John H. Perry
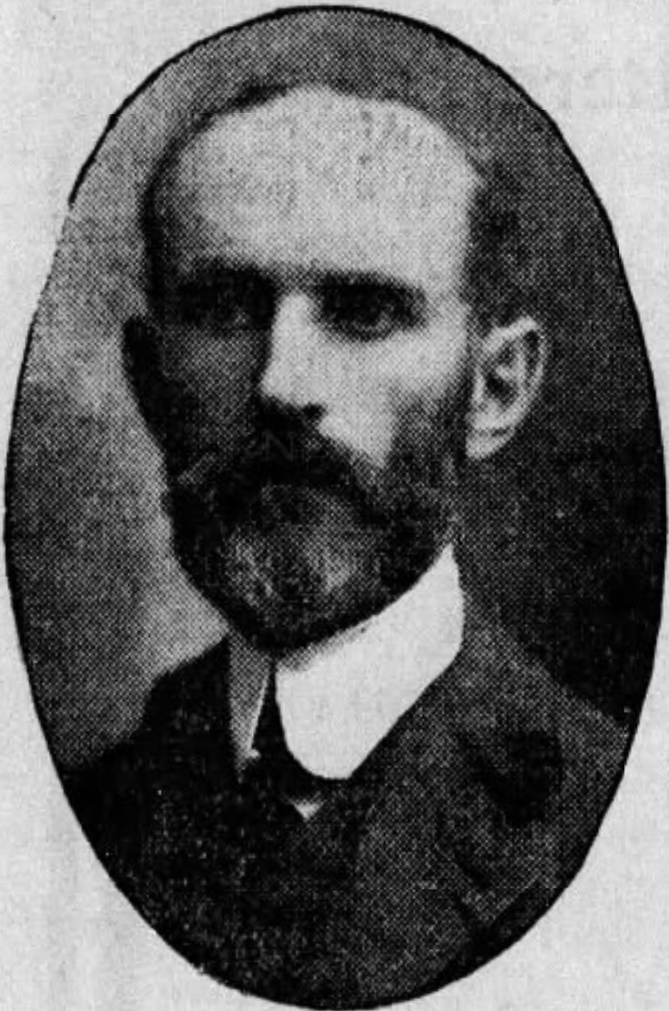
- Photo of Perry (c. 1905)

Member of the Connecticut Senate from the 25th district
- In office 1913–1915
- Preceded by: Stiles Judson
- Succeeded by: Frederick M. Salmon

Speaker of the Connecticut House of Representatives
- In office 1889
- Preceded by: Heusted W. R. Hoyt
- Succeeded by: Allen W. Paige

Member of the Connecticut House of Representatives from Fairfield
- In office 1877–1878, 1881, 1889

Personal details
- Born: John Hoyt Perry; July 26, 1848 Southport, Connecticut, U.S.
- Died: September 2, 1928 (aged 80) Averill, Vermont, U.S.
- Party: Republican
- Spouse: Virginia Bulkley (m. 1874; died 1923)
- Parent: Oliver Henry Perry (father)
- Education: Yale University (BA); Columbia Law School (LLB)
- Occupation: Politician; lawyer; judge

John Hoyt Perry (July 26, 1848 – September 2, 1928) was a lawyer, judge and politician from Southport, Connecticut. He served in both chambers of the Connecticut General Assembly and was the speaker of the Connecticut House of Representatives in 1889.

== Early life ==
John Hoyt Perry was born on July 26, 1848, in Southport, Connecticut, to Harriet Elizabeth (née Hoyt) and Oliver Henry Perry. He attended Hawley Olmstead's Academy in Wilton. John H. Perry was a member of Skull and Bones at Yale University and graduated in 1870 with a Bachelor of Arts. He later received a master's degree from Yale in 1873. Perry graduated from Columbia Law School with a Bachelor of Laws in 1872.

== Career ==
Perry started practicing law in Norwalk in 1872 and moved to Bridgeport in 1887. Perry was selected judge of the common pleas court in Fairfield County, Connecticut. He was re-appointed several terms, serving from 1889 to 1893.

Perry was a Republican. Perry served in the Connecticut House of Representatives for four sessions. Perry was elected as speaker of the Connecticut House of Representatives in 1889. He was appointed by President William McKinley as an agent for the United States and Chilean Claims Commission in 1900.

Perry represented Southport in the Connecticut Constitutional Convention of 1902. He served as the vice president of the convention. In 1902, Perry was considered for the Republican nomination in the 1902 Connecticut gubernatorial election, but he withdrew his name in favor of Abiram Chamberlain. In June 1903, Perry was appointed as a commissioner of the Connecticut State Police. He served again as police commissioner from 1913 to 1917. By 1919, Perry was serving as president of the board of commissioners.

Starting in 1909, Perry worked with a commission to push legislation in Connecticut to have a direct primary, a system of election that had become popular in other states in the country at the time. In 1913, Perry served as a member of the Connecticut Senate, representing the 25th District.

In January 1922, Perry was appointed as city counsel of Fairfield. Perry was elected to the Fairfield school board in October 1923. He resigned from the school committee in March 1924. Perry served as a director of the Hartford Retreat, president of the Southport Savings Bank and director of the Southport Trust Company.

== Personal life ==
Perry married Virginia Bulkley on September 23, 1874. His wife died in 1923.

In 1912, Perry was injured in an automotive accident after jumping out of the car prior to a head-on collision. Perry died on September 2, 1928, at a summer camp in Averill, Vermont.
