= Tony Scott (politician) =

American politician

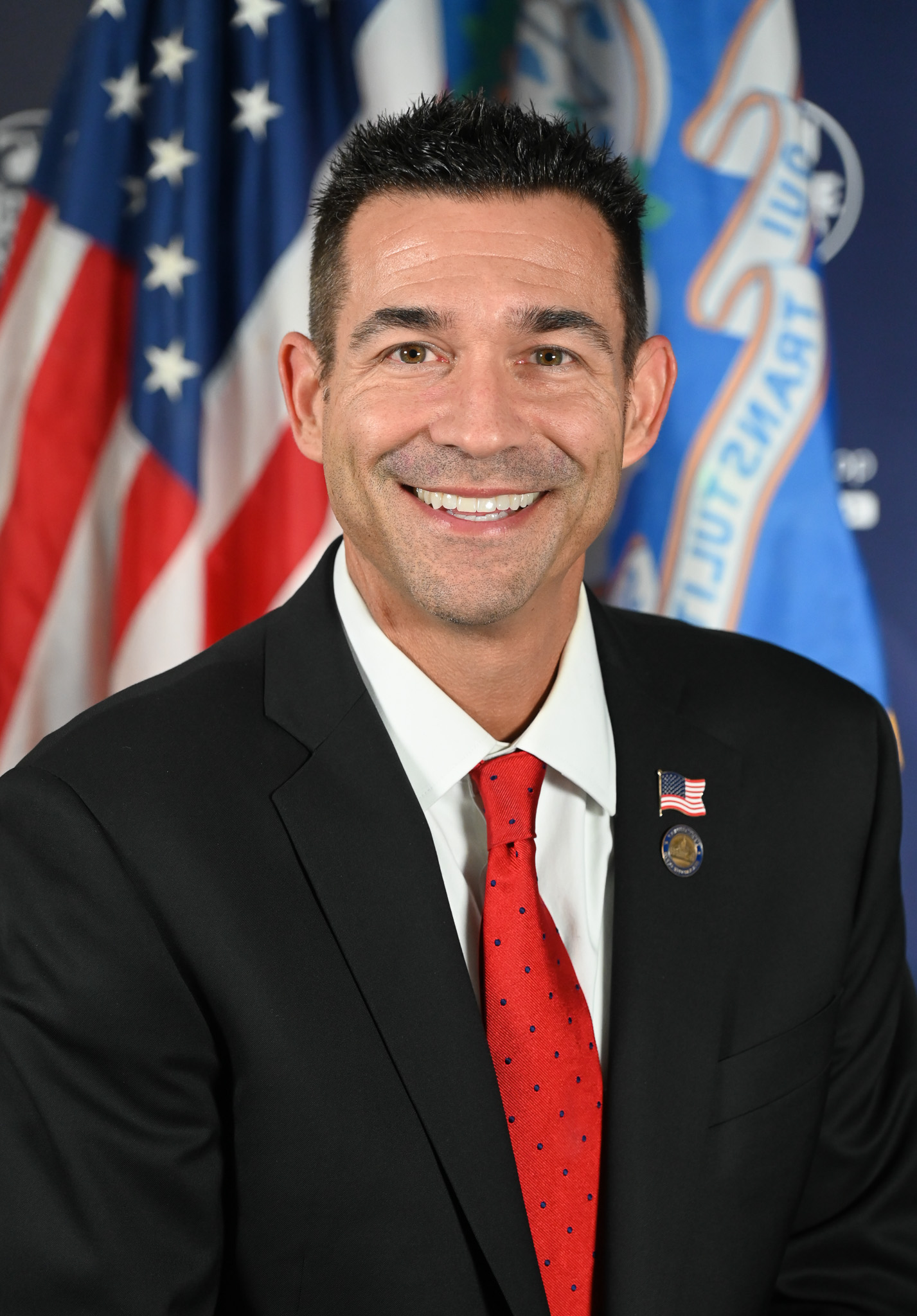
- Scott in 2025

Member of the Connecticut House of Representatives from the 112th district
- Incumbent
- Assumed office April 19, 2021
- Preceded by: J.P. Sredzinski

Personal details
- Born: August 14, 1976 (age 50) Orlando, Florida, U.S.
- Party: Republican
- Children: 2 daughters
- Education: Penn State University (BA)
- Profession: Marketing Executive
- Website: Official Website

Tony Scott (born August 14, 1976) is an American politician currently serving as a member of the Connecticut House of Representatives from the 112th district, which includes the town of Monroe and parts of Easton and Trumbull. Scott is a member of the Republican Party. Scott was elected to the seat during a special election which was held after incumbent Republican J.P. Sredzinski vacated the seat in February 2021. Scott defeated Democrat Nick Kapoor by over 7 points in the April 13th election. In 2022, Scott won re-election, beating his opponent by nearly 20 points. Most recently in 2024, Scott won a third term by over 12 points.

== Personal life and education ==
Born in Orlando, Scott has lived in Monroe, Connecticut, since 2007. He earned a bachelor's degree in broadcast journalism with a minor in history from Penn State University. Scott married his wife, Jenn, in 2003 in Newtown, Connecticut.

== Professional career ==
Scott has worked in marketing most of his professional career. He is currently the senior promotions manager at Edgewell Personal Care in Shelton, Connecticut. Before his current role, he worked in a similar role for Henkel Corporation in Stamford, Connecticut. He also worked on the floor of the Chicago Mercantile Exchange in Chicago, Illinois, from 2002-2007.

== Political career ==
Since moving to Monroe, Scott has served on local boards and commissions before becoming state representative. Scott first served on the Monroe Economic Development Commission before moving to the Monroe Parks & Recreation Commission. He served there for 9 years and was chairman for the last 6 years of his service to the commission. He was next appointed to Monroe's town council, serving over a year before resigning to become state representative.

During his Freshman term (2021–2023), Scott served on three committees: Public Safety & Security, Human Services and Higher Education & Employment Advancement.

For his previous term in 2023–2025, Scott was appointed ranking member of the Housing Committee, while also serving on the General Law and Higher Education & Employment Advancement Committees.

In the current term, running 2025-2027, Scott has once again been named ranking member of the Housing Committee and will also serve on the Human Services and Executive & Legislative Nominations Committees.

Scott is against raising taxes.

== Electoral history ==
Connecticut House of Representatives: Special Election 2021: 112th district
Party	Candidate	Votes	%
Republican	Tony Scott	2,248	53.2
Democratic	Nick Kapoor	1,948	46.1
Independent	William Furrier	31	0.7
Total votes		4,227	100

Connecticut House of Representatives: General Election 2022: 112th district
Party	Candidate	Votes	%
Republican	Tony Scott	6,700	59.9
Democratic	Sheila Papps	4,484	40.1
Total votes		11,184	100

Connecticut House of Representatives: General Election 2024: 112th district
Party	Candidate	Votes	%
Republican	Tony Scott	8,328	56.2
Democratic	Beth Cliff	6,480	43.8
Total votes		14,808	100
