= Sandy Nafis =

American politician (born 1955)

Member of the Connecticut House of Representatives from the 27th district
- In office January 6, 1999 – January 7, 2015
- Preceded by: Dominic Mazzoccoli
- Succeeded by: Gary Byron

Personal details
- Born: March 6, 1955 (age 71) New Haven, Connecticut, U.S.
- Party: Democratic

Sandy Nafis (born March 6, 1955) is an American politician who served in the Connecticut House of Representatives from the 27th district from 1999 to 2015.
