= Adele Kusnitz =

American politician (1914–2012)

Member of the Connecticut House of Representatives from the 112th district
- In office 1981–1991
- Preceded by: Walter J. Henderson
- Succeeded by: William Varese

Personal details
- Born: Adele Levine; September 8, 1941 Bridgeport, Connecticut, U.S.
- Died: November 11, 2012 (aged 71) Fort Lauderdale, Florida, U.S.
- Party: Republican
- Spouse: Leland Warren Kusnitz
- Children: 2

Adele Levine Kusnitz (September 8, 1941 – November 11, 2012) was an American politician who served in the Connecticut House of Representatives from 1981 to 1991, representing the 112th district as a Republican.

== Personal life ==
She was Jewish.
