= Toni Walker =

American politician

Member of the Connecticut House of Representatives from the 93rd district
- Incumbent
- Assumed office June 2001
- Preceded by: Howard Scipio

Personal details
- Born: February 17, 1952 (age 74)
- Party: Democratic
- Education: Southern Connecticut State University (BA); Fordham University (MSW)

Toni Walker (born February 17, 1952) is an American politician who has served in the Connecticut House of Representatives from the 93rd district since 2001.
