= Hank Bielawa =

American politician (born 1933)

Member of the Connecticut House of Representatives from the 2nd district
- In office January 8, 2003 – January 3, 2007
- Preceded by: Barnaby Horton
- Succeeded by: Jason Bartlett

Personal details
- Born: October 21, 1933 (age 92) New Bedford, Massachusetts, U.S.
- Party: Republican

Hank Bielawa (born October 21, 1933) is an American politician who served in the Connecticut House of Representatives from the 2nd district from 2003 to 2007.
