= Jason Bartlett (politician) =

American politician

Member of the Connecticut House of Representatives from the 2nd district
- In office January 2007 – January 2011
- Preceded by: Hank Bielawa
- Succeeded by: Dan Carter

Personal details
- Party: Democratic

Jason Bartlett is an American businessman and politician from Connecticut. A Democrat, he was a member of the Connecticut House of Representatives from 2007 to 2011, representing the state's second district in Bethel, Danbury and Redding. He was defeated for re-election on November 2, 2010.

== Biography ==
Bartlett was raised in Redding and graduated from Redding Public Schools, before earning a B.A. in political science from the University of Connecticut.

He was elected a state representative in 2006, defeating Republican Phil Gallagher by 4,112 votes (54 percent) to 3,524 (46 percent). In 2008, Bartlett was re-elected to a second term, polling 54% — a margin of 945 votes. In 2010, Bartlett faced Republican Dan Carter and was defeated.

He had previously run in 2002 and 2004, losing on both occasions to Republican Hank Bielawa. He lost by over 450 votes in 2002, but the 2004 result was exceptionally close — Bartlett lost by just 87 votes, with 49.6 percent of the vote to Bielawa's 50.4 percent.

In 2012, Bartlett ran for Connecticut's 24th Senate District, comprising Danbury, New Fairfield, Sherman and part of Bethel but lost by a very small margin to Michael McLachlan.

== Personal life ==
For over a decade, Bartlett has owned and operated his own mortgage company. He is the owner of Connecticut First Capitol in Bethel as well as a restaurant in Hartford. Bartlett is no longer with the mortgage company he owned and operated. He briefly worked for the National Black Justice Coalition, a non-profit dedicated to ending racism and homophobia by empowering black lesbian, gay, bisexual, and transgender people.

He raised two sons, the children of his deceased uncle and aunt. Now 21 and 19 years old and both attending community college in Connecticut, they came to live with him when they were 11 and 9 respectively.

Bartlett is openly gay. Although his district was 96 percent white, Bartlett is African American. He served for a time as the country's only openly gay black state legislator, a distinction he lost when Simone Bell was elected to the Georgia House of Representatives in December 2009.
