= Richard J. Balducci =

American politician (born 1942)

Richard Balducci

Member of the Connecticut State Senate from the 9th district
- In office 1993–1995
- Preceded by: Cynthia Matthews
- Succeeded by: Biagio Ciotto

Speaker of the Connecticut House of Representatives
- In office 1989–1993
- Preceded by: Irving Stolberg
- Succeeded by: Thomas Ritter

Member of the Connecticut House of Representatives from the 27th district
- In office 1975–1993
- Preceded by: Elmer A. Mortensen
- Succeeded by: Dominic Mazzoccoli

Personal details
- Born: 6 March 1942 (age 84)
- Party: Democratic

Richard J. Balducci (born March 6, 1942) is a retired lobbyist and politician from Newington, Connecticut who was the Speaker of the Connecticut House of Representatives from 1989 to 1992. He also served one term in the Connecticut State Senate.

== Political career ==
Balducci previously sat on the board of regents of the Connecticut State Colleges & Universities. He was the head of the Board's Finance and Infrastructure Committee.

== Business career ==
Balducci taught history for 17 years in the Newington public school system. He was also a partner in New England Recovery, an automobile salvage business.

Balducci is a partner in the lobbying firm Doyle, D'Amore and Balducci.
