= Augie Wolf =

American former field athlete (born 1961)

Personal information
- Born: September 3, 1961 (age 65) St. Paul, Minnesota, United States

Sport
- Sport: Track and field
Medal record
Representing the United States
U.S. Indoor National Championship
| Gold medal – first place | 1984 New York | Shot put |
| Silver medal – second place | 1989 New York | Shot put |
U.S. Outdoor National Championship
| Gold medal – first place | 1984 | Shot put |

August Louis "Augie" Wolf (born September 3, 1961) is an American former field athlete known for throwing the shot put. He is a graduate of Princeton University. He is a former United States indoor shot put national champion, United States outdoor shot put national champion, and an Olympian. A member of the Republican Party, he sought the Republican nomination for the U.S. Senate for Connecticut in 2016 against Democratic incumbent Richard Blumenthal. He was defeated at the state Republican convention by state representative from Bethel, Dan Carter.

== Early life and education ==
Wolf was raised in St. Paul, Minnesota, and is a 1983 graduate of Princeton University.

== Career ==
Wolf studied and trained at Princeton University from 1979 to 1983, becoming the record-holder in the Ivy League with a throw of 67-2. After training in Leverkusen, Germany, with TSV Bayer 04 he placed 2nd in the 1984 Olympic Trials, earning a spot on the American team at the 1984 Summer Olympics, placing fourth in the shot put competition. Wolf won the Indoor National title at the February 1984 USA-Mobil Indoor Track and Field Championship at the Madison Square Garden with a throw of 69 feet 0.75 inches (21.05 m). He was the 1984 United States National champion. Wolf placed fifth at the 1983 World University Games in Edmonton, Alberta, Canada. Wolf's career personal bests were 21.73 metres (71 ft 3.5 in) in the shot put and 63.73 metres (209 ft 1.1 in) in the discus throw.

During his athletic career, Wolf was involved in one drug testing violation. The International Association of Athletics Federations (IAAF) initially banned Wolf for life after ruling he had refused post-match testing on July 7, 1985, in Byrkjelo, Norway. Supported by the USA Track & Field Federation, he appealed citing errors in the testing notification. The ban was reduced to an eighteen-month suspension and he returned to competition in 1987.

== Personal ==
Wolf founded and leads US Athletic Trust, a sport NGO providing support and advocacy for American Olympic athletes, and was named Trustee of the United States Olympic and Paralympic Foundation in 2014. After the series of U.S. Olympic scandals in 2018, he also cofounded Olympians Rising, a non-profit group of Olympians and friends supporting urgent reform to the U.S. Olympic Committee and rebuilding the U.S. Olympic program from the ground up.

== Politics ==
Wolf sought to be the 2016 Republican candidate for Connecticut's U.S. Senate seat, currently held by Democrat Richard Blumenthal. He was defeated by state representative Dan Carter at the state Republican convention on May 9, securing less than the 15% of delegates required for an automatic primary. On May 11, Wolf announced that he would attempt to force a primary by collecting the signatures of 8,079 registered Republicans by June 7.

On October 19, 2015, billionaire, industrialist David Koch held a fundraiser for three Senators and August Wolf in his campaign for United States Senate against Blumenthal.

On June 1, 2016, The Hartford Courant reported that a former campaign staffer Samantha Menh filed a suit against the Campaign, August Wolf, and Campaign manager Baylor Myers, alleging breach of contract. The lawsuit also claimed Wolf violated federal and Connecticut campaign laws, and cited several unsubstantiated claims of untoward behavior. It was said by the attorney representing Baylor Myers that "we will present evidence that Ms. Menh had planned to quit her job with that previous employer and bring a false claim of sexual harassment to leverage a settlement. The allegations made in this lawsuit are false and we can prove it.”

== Defamatory Narrative ==
On September 14, 2018, Wolf filed a 32 page federal lawsuit https://wolf-vs-samantha-menh.vercel.app/ for Menh’s tortious interference with contract and business expectancies, defamation per se, and common law conspiracy. This filing and dozens of other exhibits were provided to the court and plaintiff in September 2022.

On October 19, 2022, six and a half years after Ms. Menh had filed her original complaint, Ms. Menh voluntarily withdrew her complaint against Wolf, without any financial settlement. A jury trial had been scheduled on commence on November 1, 2022, less than two weeks later.

=== 2016 Connecticut Republican State Convention ===
| Candidate | Delegates | Percentage |
|---|---|---|
| Dan Carter | 907 | 76.7% |
| August Wolf | 123 | 10.4% |
| Jack Orchulli | 20 | 1.7% |
| Not Present | 132 | 11.2% |

After gaining the support of over 17% of the delegates in the first round of voting (over the 15% hurdle for ballot access), Wolf's supporters were then aggressively lobbied by Super Delegates, and about 50 switched to Carter before the final tally. Upon failing to secure 15% of the delegates at the State Republican Convention, Wolf decided to petition onto the primary ballot.

He failed to gather the required signatures of 2% of registered Republican voters, 8,079, and the state Secretary of State verified just 5,280 signatures on June 21, 2016. August Wolf failed to force a primary with party endorsed candidate Dan Carter. He then suspended his campaign.

== See also ==
- List of Princeton University Olympians
