= Dominic Mazzoccoli =

American politician

Member of the Connecticut House of Representatives from the 27th district
- In office January 6, 1993 – January 6, 1999
- Preceded by: Richard J. Balducci
- Succeeded by: Sandy Nafis

Personal details
- Born: February 4, 1952 Hartford, Connecticut
- Died: February 11, 2016 (aged 64) Newington, Connecticut
- Party: Republican

Dominic Mazzoccoli (February 4, 1952 – February 11, 2016) was an American politician who served in the Connecticut House of Representatives from the 27th district from 1993 to 1999.

He died of ALS on February 11, 2016, in Newington, Connecticut at age 64.
