= Barbara Lambert =

American politician

Barbara L. Lambert
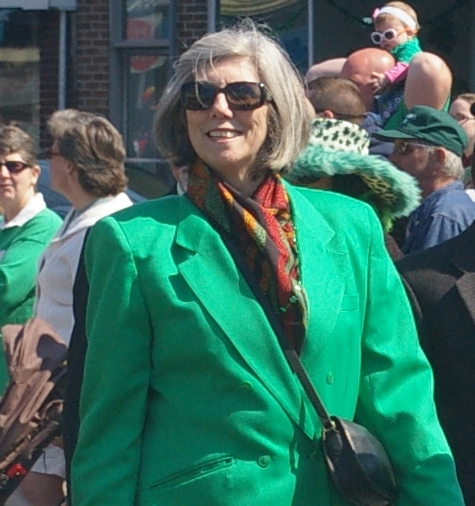
- Representative Lambert marches in Milford’s 2010 St. Patrick’s Day Parade.

Member of the Connecticut House of Representatives from the 118th district
- In office January 2009 – January 2011
- Preceded by: James A. Amann
- Succeeded by: Kim Rose

Personal details
- Born: Milford, Connecticut
- Party: Democratic

Barbara L. Lambert is a Connecticut politician. From January 2009 to January 2011, she served one term as State Representative from Connecticut's 118th General Assembly District, which represents part of Milford. Prior to her election to the Connecticut House, Lambert served as a member of Milford's Board of Aldermen, elected from the city's Second District.

In September 2009, Lambert made national headlines along with fellow Democratic Representative Jack Hennessy when an Associated Press photograph taken by photographer Jessica Hill depicting them playing solitaire on state-issued laptop computers during a budget hearing at the State Capitol was posted on the Internet. State House Minority Leader Larry Cafero, who was speaking on the Capitol floor at the time, said that the picture "speaks for itself" in regard to the legislators' priorities. Lambert retorted that she was "still listening to [Cafero]".

On March 23, 2010, Lambert announced that she would not seek another term in the General Assembly. She was succeeded by fellow Democrat Kim Rose in January 2011.
