= DebraLee Hovey =

American politician (born 1954)

Member of the Connecticut House of Representatives from the 112th district
- In office 2003–2015
- Preceded by: Pat Shea
- Succeeded by: J.P. Sredzinski

Personal details
- Born: July 15, 1954 Houlton, Maine, U.S.
- Party: Republican
- Education: University of Maine; University of Hawaiʻi at Mānoa; University of Texas at Austin

DebraLee Hovey (born July 15, 1954) is an American politician who served in the Connecticut House of Representatives from 2003 to 2015, representing the 112th district as a Republican.

== Biography ==
Hovey was born on July 15, 1954, in Houlton, Maine. She graduated from the University of Maine, the University of Hawaiʻi at Mānoa and the University of Texas at Austin (Educational Psychology/Curriculum for Young Gifted Children).

== Career ==
Hovey was first elected to the Connecticut House of Representatives in 2002 and served six terms representing the 112th district as a Republican. Hovey did not seek reelection in 2014 and retired in 2015. She was succeeded by J.P. Sredzinski, whom she expressed support for in a 2014 opinion piece.
