= Christopher G. Donovan =

American politician (born 1953)

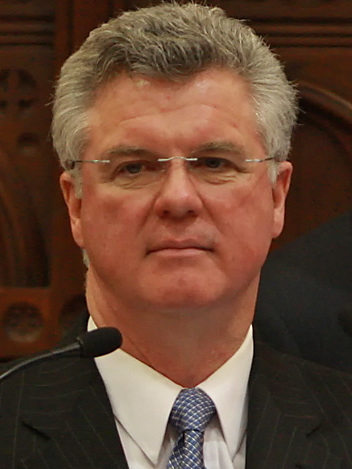
- Rep. Donovan on the opening day of the 2009 Session

Speaker of the Connecticut House of Representatives
- In office January 7, 2009 – January 9, 2013
- Preceded by: James Amann
- Succeeded by: Brendan Sharkey

Member of the Connecticut House of Representatives from the 84th district
- In office 1993 – January 9, 2013
- Preceded by: William DeZinno
- Succeeded by: Hilda Santiago

Personal details
- Born: October 22, 1953 (age 73) Darby, Pennsylvania, U.S.
- Party: Democratic
- Education: Villanova University (BA) University of Connecticut (MSW)

Christopher G. Donovan (born October 22, 1953) is a former American Democratic politician who was elected to be the Speaker of the Connecticut House of Representatives. He was sworn in as Speaker on January 7, 2009, and left his post in 2013, having not sought reelection to the House. He is the first grassroots organizer to become speaker of the Connecticut House.

Donovan was a candidate for United States Congress in 2012, losing in the primary to Elizabeth Esty.

== Education ==
Donovan graduated from Monsignor Bonner High School in Drexel Hill, Pennsylvania, in 1971. He earned his bachelor's degree in Biology at Villanova University in 1975 and his master's degree in Social Work from the University of Connecticut School of Social Work. He is a teacher on the faculty of the University of Hartford.

== Career ==
Donovan has been a SEIU community leader since the 1970s. He ran for the 82nd House district in 1990, but lost the Democratic primary to incumbent Thomas S. Luby. He was elected to the Connecticut General Assembly in 1992 representing the 84th Assembly District of Meriden, Connecticut. He later served as House Chair of the Labor and Public Employees Committee from 1997 to 2003 and was elected Majority Leader, serving from November 2004 to 2008. Donovan was first elected to serve as Speaker of the House in 2009.

=== Healthcare ===
During his legislative career, Donovan has championed many successful healthcare initiatives which include expanding prescription drug assistance for seniors and disabled adults (ConnPACE); health insurance for low-income children (HUSKY) (HB7065); adding supplemental Medicare coverage, and; establishing school-based health clinics. Other notable healthcare initiatives include:

==== SustiNet ====
SustiNet (PA 09-148) lays out a framework for leveraging the bargaining power of state health care purchasing to create a large pool open to individuals and groups and a structure for a state-wide healthcare delivery system that contains costs and promotes preventive care. The 2009 legislation authorized the SustiNet Board of Directors and its task forces and committees to make recommendations on the implementation of SustiNet to the 2011 General Assembly. The final report is expected prior to the start of session. The Public Health Committee anticipates that it will raise a bill outlining the next phase of the SustiNet proposal based on these recommendations.

==== Implementing federal health care reform ====
In addition to insurance reforms, the federal Patient Protection and Affordable Care Act [^ Pub.L. 111-148, 124 Stat. 119, to be codified as amended at scattered sections of 42 U.S.C.] contains provisions related to health care workforce, long term care, slowing cost growth, prevention and wellness. The SustiNet framework provides many opportunities for capturing and coordinating these new resources and the committee will have the chance to consider targeting resources at areas that could benefit from cost and quality improvements. For example, there are many grants opportunities for workforce development and community health promotion.

==== Connecticut Healthcare Partnership ====
The Connecticut Healthcare Partnership legislation (last considered in 2009 as PA 09-147) would allow municipalities, small businesses, and non-profits to voluntarily join the state employee health insurance plan, creating a large pool of insured lives yielding significantly lower costs. The governor vetoed this measure twice, but finally signed a less sweeping form of the legislation, which permitted municipalities to purchase prescription coverage through the state, in 2010. This legislation will be considered again in 2011. Donovan has been recognized for his efforts by numerous groups.

On July 13, 2010, House Speaker Donovan came out in favor of the United States Court of Appeals for the Second Circuit decision in Green Party of Connecticut v. Garfield on campaign finance ("pay to play"), in solidarity with Governor Rell.

=== Labor, minimum wage, state budget ===
In 1998, 2000 and again in 2002, as chair of the Labor and Public Employees Committee, Donovan successfully brought out of committee bills that raised the state's minimum wage (HB 5160).

In 2000 he set the first standard wage for service workers across the state. PA 99-142

Other bills he helped pass include; balancing the state budget and eliminating a $10 billion deficit (HB 6802); stem cell research (SB 934); creating green technology jobs (SB 494); addressing the education achievement gap (HB 5491); campaign finance reform; allowing civil unions; paid family medical leave; and fully funding the Teacher's Retirement Fund at $235 million (HB 5845).

=== Speaker task force initiatives ===
Donovan has convened a bipartisan legislative task force to formulate Connecticut's response to domestic violence and the legislature approved its most sweeping reforms to domestic violence laws in over 25 years when it approved a package of bills addressing criminal justice, housing and human services, and education issues related to this crime. The changes include GPS monitoring for high risk domestic violence offenders, improvement of enforcing protective orders, the creation of three additional domestic violence court dockets, school family and teen dating violence programs, and measures to ensure victims can remove themselves from dangerous and unsafe living environments.

The Speaker's Commission on Municipal Opportunities and Regional Efficiencies (MORE) initiated a new approach to finding cost efficiencies through regional collaboration between state and local governments in Connecticut. Employee health insurance plans and school transportation agreements can now be jointly contracted and cities and towns can now take advantage of the negotiating power of the state's health plan for prescription drug coverage for their employees.

During his tenure as Speaker in 2009 and 2010, Donovan brought forth a 2/3 majority vote, successfully overturning the governor's veto 15 times on important issues, such as

- Clean Elections (SB 551)
- Standard Wage for Certain Connecticut Workers (HB 6502) []
- Establishment of the Sustinet Plan (HB 6600)

=== Recognition ===
Donovan has been recognized for his efforts by numerous groups, such as:

- The Purple Tie Award for "men who have taken a stand against domestic violence" by the Meriden-Wallingford Chrysalis Inc.;
- The Mental Health Outstanding Advocate Award from the Region II Regional Mental Health Board;
- The CT Early Childhood Alliance Legislator of the Year Award;
- The Connecticut Family Resource Center Alliance "Friend of the Family Award;"
- The Connecticut Police Chief's Association Legislative Award;
- The Connecticut Voices for Children "First for Kids 2009 Legislative Leadership Award;"
- The Child Advocacy Legislative Leadership Award, was NASW's Legislator of the Year;
- Capitol Community College's recognition as an honorary member of Phi Theta Kappa, an international honor society.

== Congressional campaign ==
Donovan was a candidate for Congress for Connecticut's 5th district, which was being vacated by Democratic Rep. Chris Murphy, who decided to run for Senate. In May 2012, Donovan won the Connecticut Democratic Party's endorsement. His primary opponents were Elizabeth Esty and Dan Roberti.

On May 30, 2012, Robert Braddock, Donovan's campaign finance director, was arrested by the FBI and charged with conspiracy to conceal the source of a campaign contribution. Donovan relieved himself of his duties as Speaker for a subsequent special session of the General Assembly, but denied any knowledge of Braddock's alleged actions and vowed to continue his campaign.

On July 26, 2012, seven people where charged in federal court with influence peddling, including Braddock and Donovan's longtime aide Joshua Nassi. "What I didn't expect, what I'm practically speechless about, is that in spite of my hard-earned reputation for honesty and my career working for campaign finance reform, that there are people who thought that they could buy my vote," Donovan said in the statement. "That's everything that's wrong about politics, and everything I've spent my life fighting against."

Braddock was subsequently convicted on May 21, 2013, of three counts of conspiring to hide the source of $27,500 in campaign donations. Nassi was convicted of making false statements and sentenced to 28 months.

Donovan went on to lose the primary to Esty less than two months later. He subsequently withdrew his name from the ballot, where he had been endorsed by the Working Families Party. In 2014, the federal investigation into his campaign ended with no charges brought against him. In 2015, Donovan was hired as a field representative for the Connecticut Education Association.

== Personal life ==
Donovan is married to Elaine Gallen Donovan. They live in Meriden. They have a daughter, Sarah, a graduate of American University, Washington College of Law and a son, Aaron, who resides in Vancouver.

Connecticut House of Representatives
Preceded by William DeZinno	Connecticut state representative for the 84th District; 1993–2013	Succeeded by Hilda Santiago
Preceded by James Amann	Majority Leader of the Connecticut House of Representatives; 2005–2009	Succeeded by Denise Merrill
Preceded by James Amann	Speaker of the Connecticut House of Representatives; 2009–2013	Succeeded by Brendan Sharkey
