= William Varese =

American politician

Member of the Connecticut House of Representatives from the 112th district
- In office January 9, 1991 – January 6, 1999
- Preceded by: Adele Kusnitz
- Succeeded by: Pat Shea

Personal details
- Born: July 28, 1947 Bridgeport, Connecticut
- Died: April 28, 2019 (aged 71) Stratford, Connecticut
- Party: Republican

William Varese (July 28, 1947 – April 28, 2019) was an American politician who served in the Connecticut House of Representatives from the 112th district from 1991 to 1999.

He died on April 28, 2019, in Stratford, Connecticut at age 71.
