= Thomas D. Ritter =

American politician (born 1952)

Speaker of the Connecticut House of Representatives
- In office January 1993 – January 1999
- Preceded by: Richard J. Balducci
- Succeeded by: Moira K. Lyons

Member of the Connecticut House of Representatives from the 2nd district
- In office January 1983 – January 1999
- Preceded by: Arthur A. Brouillet Jr.
- Succeeded by: Barnaby Horton

Member of the Connecticut House of Representatives from the 6th district
- In office January 1981 – January 1983
- Preceded by: George J. Ritter
- Succeeded by: Abraham Giles

Personal details
- Born: Thomas Drummond Ritter; November 24, 1952 (age 73) New Haven, Connecticut, U.S.
- Party: Democratic
- Spouse: Christine Keller
- Children: Matthew Ritter
- Education: Amherst College (BA); University of Connecticut (JD)

Thomas Drummond Ritter (born November 24, 1952) is an American lawyer, lobbyist, and retired politician from Connecticut who was the Speaker of the Connecticut House of Representatives from 1993 to 1999.

== Early life and education ==
Ritter attended Amherst College and later the University of Connecticut School of Law.

== Family ==
Ritter's wife, Christine Keller, is an appellate court judge. Both his father and his brother are former lawmakers. His son Matthew Ritter is also a lawyer and State Representative as well as the current Speaker of the Connecticut House of Representatives.

== Political career ==
Ritter served on the Hartford Democratic Town Committee from 1975 to 1980 and was a member of the Connecticut House of Representatives from 1980 to 1998. He was the speaker from 1993 to 1998.

Ritter and Moira K. Lyons are the only three-term Speakers in the history of the Connecticut House of Representatives.

Ritter sits on the UCONN board of directors. In 2019, he became the acting chair of the board when chairman Kruger stepped down. Kruger has named West Hartford Mayor Shari Cantor as his preferred permanent successor over Ritter, writing that "it's time for the University board to be led by a woman." Some have cited emoluments as a potential risk of his chairmanship.

== Legal career ==
Ritter is currently a partner at the law firm of Brown Rudnick. Prior to joining the firm, he worked as an attorney for the Hartford Corporation Counsel and was in private practice for many years. Freedom of Information Act requests for communications between Ritter and his client the Connecticut Resources Recovery Authority were at the center of a Connecticut Supreme Court case in 2016.

Connecticut House of Representatives
Preceded by George J. Ritter	Member of the Connecticut House of Representatives from the 6th district 1981–1983	Succeeded by Abraham Giles
Preceded by Arthur A. Brouillet, Jr.	Member of the Connecticut House of Representatives from the 2nd district 1983–1999	Succeeded by Barnaby Horton
Political offices
Preceded by Richard J. Balducci	Speaker of the Connecticut House of Representatives; 1993–1999	Succeeded by Moira K. Lyons
