= James Amann =

American politician (born 1956)

James A. Amann
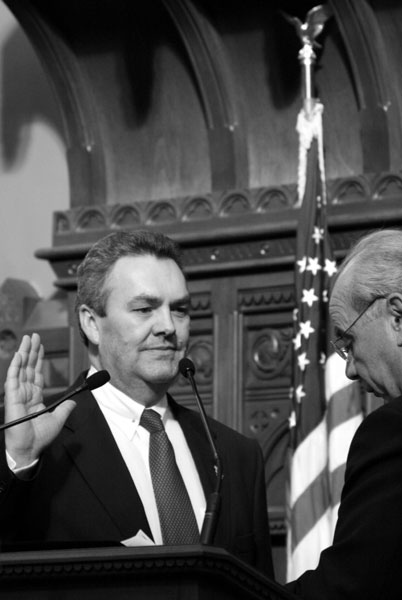
- James Amann being sworn in at the start of the 2007 Legislative Session

Speaker of the Connecticut House of Representatives
- In office January 5, 2005 – January 7, 2009
- Preceded by: Moira Lyons
- Succeeded by: Christopher G. Donovan

Member of the Connecticut House of Representatives from the 118th district
- In office 1991–2009
- Preceded by: Timothy J. Casey
- Succeeded by: Barbara Lambert

Personal details
- Born: 1956 (age 69–70) Bridgeport, Connecticut, U.S.
- Party: Democratic

James A. Amann (born 1956 in Bridgeport, Connecticut) is a former Connecticut State Representative. He was a member of the Connecticut House of Representatives and represented the 118th Assembly District, which includes part of Milford, Connecticut.

== Career ==
Amann was first elected to office in 1990 and has served as the Speaker of the House since being elected to that position prior to the 2005 Legislative Session. Previously Amann had served as the House Majority Leader during the 2003-04 Legislative Sessions and the House Chair of the Insurance and Real Estate Committee from 1993 to 2000.

Speaker Amann authored Connecticut's "Megan's Law," passed in 1995. The legislation - which informs parents and children about convicted sex offenders living in their neighborhoods - has been upheld by the U.S. Supreme Court.

In 2005, his first year leading the House of Representatives as Speaker, Amann was instrumental in the passage of landmark transportation, campaign finance reform, organ donor, medical malpractice reform and stem cell research legislation. Speaker Amann also is responsible for creating the Legislature’s Select Committee on Veterans’ Affairs.

Healthy Kids Connecticut is a public/private initiative Speaker Amann created in 2005 with a mission of providing healthcare access for all of Connecticut’s youth. The initiative resulted in Health First/Healthy Kids legislation passed in 2007, which will invest $300 million to improve care in the state’s HUSKY Plan for low-income children and raise reimbursements paid to hospitals and Medicaid providers.

Also during the 2006 session, Amann crafted new legislation creating film and media tax incentives to bring production work from these industries to Connecticut, and led passage of a new autism pilot program and a historic 10-year, $2.3 billion transportation investment initiative. Speaker Amann’s 2020 Vision Plan for Connecticut, passed in 2006, will require 10% of state dollars spent on children to be directed towards prevention by the year 2020.

In the 2007 session, Speaker Amann led passage of landmark reforms on energy conservation and eminent domain restraints, and historic new funding initiatives that will bolster transportation and bridge safety, education and school construction, clean water projects and the state’s public housing stock. Also, new legislation fashioned by Speaker Amann to refinance debt in the Teacher’s Retirement Fund will save taxpayers $2.8 billion over 25 years.

Amann is generally considered among the more moderate Connecticut Democrats. In 2007 he expressed skepticism about Governor Jodi Rell's proposal to increase the state income tax to pay for added education funding. By April, Amann had endorsed an income tax reduction for most taxpayers to be paid for by a small income tax rate increase on wealthier individuals. He also proposed giving legislative leaders sharing power with the governor on choosing projects for state bonding because of the record debt run up by the Governor. The Hartford Courant opposed these initiatives

== Competing 2007 budget ==
In May 2007 Quinnipiac University Polling Institute released a poll showing Amann's proposal for increasing the state income tax for wealthier residents and lowering the income tax for less wealthy residents was less popular than a no tax increase state budget offered by legislative Republicans

Amann also opposed a proposal by Republicans to suspend the state's gasoline tax over the summer months claiming that there is no evidence the oil industry will pass the savings on to the consumers and the proponents offered no way to pay for lost state revenue .

Amann eventually compromised with Rell and the Republicans and supported a budget that exceeded the state spending cap and raised the cigarette tax, but did not raise the state income tax. Efforts to reduce the state gasoline tax were dropped by Republicans during budget negotiations.

== 2010 gubernatorial bid ==
On January 31, 2008, Amann announced his creation of an exploratory committee to explore the possibility of a run for governor in the 2010 election. Amann is the first candidate to create an exploratory committee for the 2010 election, and as of December 2008 had raised $50,000 for his campaign.

In February, 2010, Amman withdrew from his campaign to seek the governor's office.

== Retirement from the legislature ==
On April 23, 2008 Amann announced that he would not seek another term as House Speaker and would be retiring from the General Assembly at the end of his current term. In January 2009 Amann's successor as Speaker, Christopher Donovan, hired Amann for a $120,000/year staff post at the State House. Shortly thereafter, Amann decided not to accept the job offer, as there was a massive outcry from voters who opposed the move during the state's financial crisis.

Political offices
Preceded by Moira Lyons	Speaker of the Connecticut House of Representatives; 2005–2009	Succeeded by Christopher G. Donovan
Preceded by David Pudlin	Majority Leader of the Connecticut House of Representatives; 2003–2005	Succeeded by Christopher G. Donovan
