= John Perkins Cushing Mather =

American politician

John Perkins Cushing Mather (September 23, 1816 – February 12, 1891) was an American politician.

Mather, the only child of Captain Andrew and Mary (Wetmore) Mather, was born in New London, Connecticut, on September 23, 1816. He graduated from Yale College in 1837. He studied law in New London and there entered on the practice of his profession. He was mayor of New London from 1845 to 1850, and after having been a member of the Lower House of the Connecticut State Legislature held the office of Secretary of State in 1850-54. From 1858 to 1861 he was Collector of the Port of New London, and in 1878 and 1879 he represented his district in the Connecticut State Senate. After service as Judge of the City Court, and as Judge of Probate, he was for twelve years Judge of the Court of Common Pleas for New London County, until disqualified by age in 1886. He died in New London on February 12, 1891, in his 75th year. He was never married.

Political offices
Preceded by Hiram Weed	Secretary of the State of Connecticut; 1850–1854	Succeeded by Oliver H. Perry
