= Jack Orchulli =

American politician

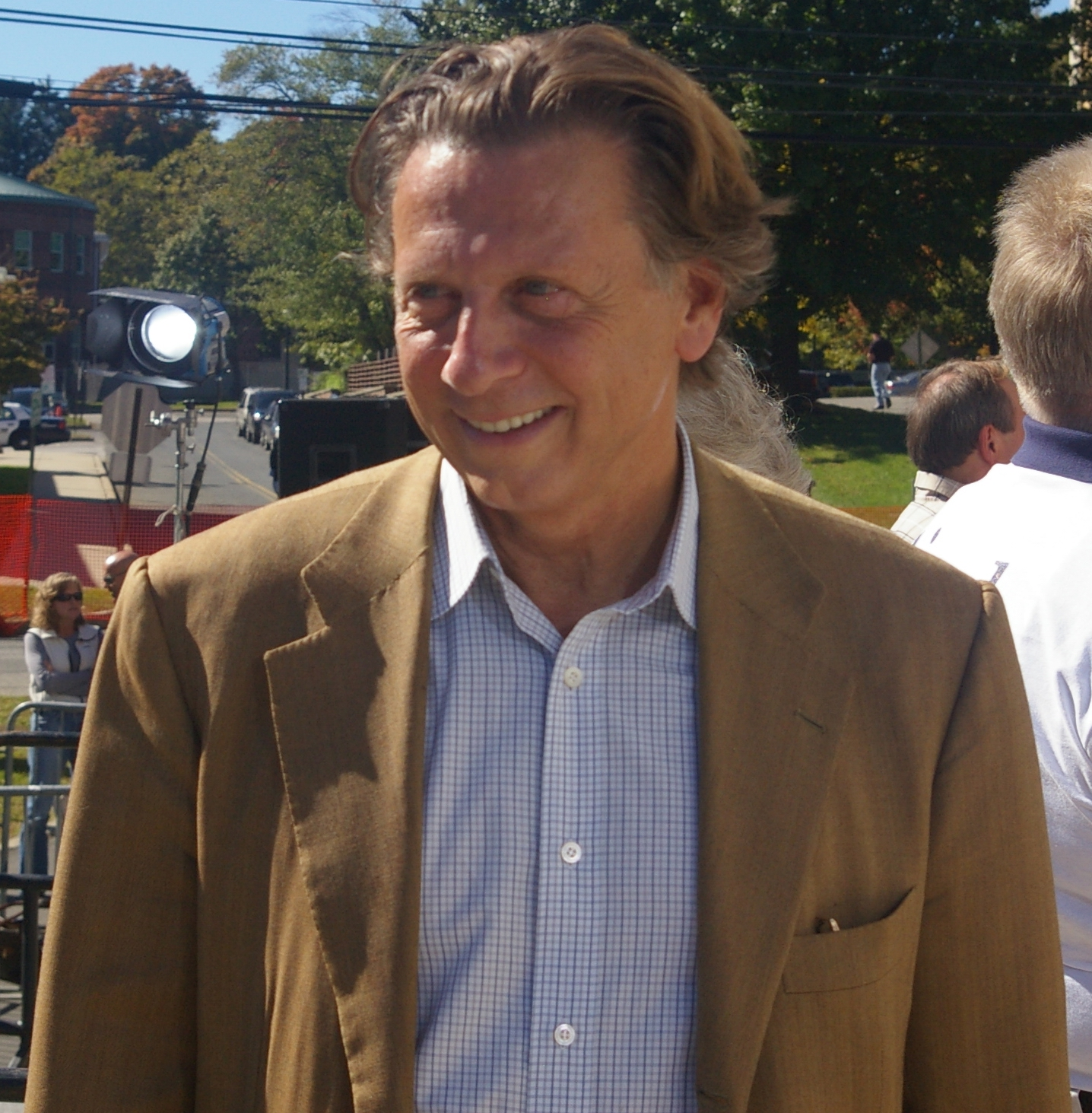
- Jack Orchulli, then a candidate for Comptroller, in Milford, Connecticut in October 2010.
- Born: 1946 (age 79–80); Pennsylvania, U.S.
- Political party: Republican

Jack Orchulli (born 1946 in Pennsylvania) is an American former founder and CEO of Michael Kors and former political candidate from Connecticut.

== Early education ==
Raised in Alpha, New Jersey, he went to Phillipsburg Catholic High School, and then received a degree from Rutgers University.

He later attended night school and received a master's degree in finance from Baruch College in New York City.

== Political career ==
He is a Darien, Connecticut, resident and was the unsuccessful Republican candidate for the Connecticut seat held by Christopher Dodd in the 2004 U.S. Senate election.

=== Michael Kors ===
In 1981, Orchulli funded and co-founded the Michael Kors Company with Michael Kors (then 19 years old) and served as CEO and Partner continuously until he sold his interests and left. At the time, Orchulli and Kors held majority stakes and the LVMH Group and Onward Kashiyama of Japan held minority interests and the minority shareholders sold along with Orchulli. Kors remained within the new company. Ironically, not long after the sale, Michael Kors joined the popular tv show Project Runway and became a nationally recognized celebrity which benefited the new company.

=== First campaign ===
Orchulli, previously an independent, became a Republican and gained the nomination in 2023 to launch his bid for the U. S. Senate seat held by then Senator Christopher Dodd a long serving Senator who had succeeded his father. Orchulli lost in that 2004 election.

=== Chairmanships ===
He was the state Republican Party finance chair in 2007

. In addition, he was a board member of the Connecticut Development Corporation for over three years, a quasi-state government organization which looks to retain and grow jobs in the state.

He was the local Darien Republican Town Committee Chairman from 2005 to 2007

=== Second campaign ===
On May 22, 2010, Orchulli was nominated to be the Republican candidate for State Comptroller, the post being vacated by incumbent Democrat Nancy Wyman. Orchulli went on to lose the general election to Democrat Kevin Lembo, receiving 43% of the vote.

I

== Private life ==
He has one son, Andrew and 3 Grandchildren

Party political offices
Preceded by Gary Franks	Republican Party nominee for United States Senator from Connecticut (Class 3); 2004	Succeeded by Linda McMahon
Preceded by Cathy Cook	Republican Party nominee for Connecticut Comptroller; 2010	Succeeded by Sharon McLaughlin
