= 2004 United States Senate election in Connecticut =

- November 2, 2004
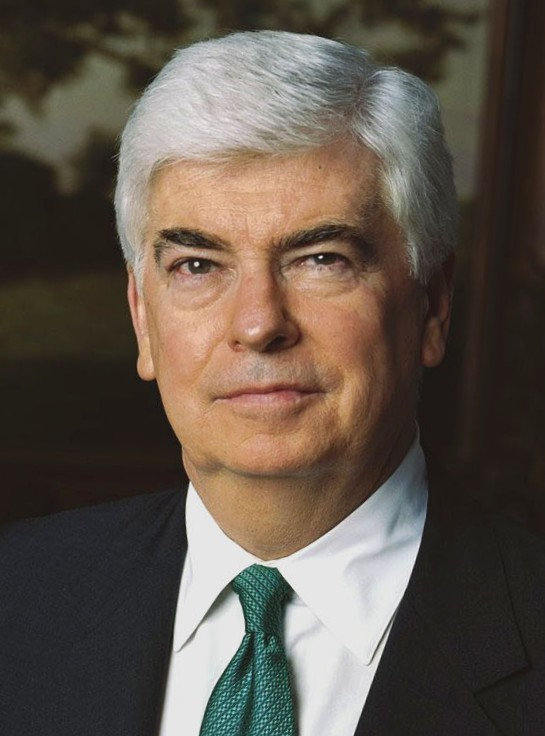

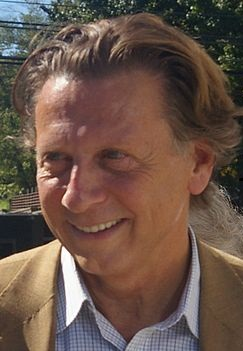
Nominee	Chris Dodd	Jack Orchulli
Party	Democratic	Republican
Popular vote	945,347	457,749
Percentage	66.35%	32.13%
- Dodd: 50–60% 60–70% 70–80% 80–90% Orchulli: 40–50% 50–60%
U.S. senator before election
Chris Dodd
Democratic
Elected U.S. Senator
Chris Dodd
Democratic

The 2004 United States Senate election in Connecticut took place on November 2, 2004, alongside other elections to the United States Senate in other states as well as elections to the United States House of Representatives and various state and local elections. Incumbent Democrat U.S. Senator Chris Dodd won re-election for a fifth term.

== Major candidates ==
=== Democratic ===
- Chris Dodd, incumbent U.S. Senator since 1981

=== Republican ===
- Jack Orchulli, CEO and co-founder of a Michael Kors's apparel company.

== General election ==
=== Campaign ===
Incumbent Chris Dodd was one of the most powerful senators in Congress. In the election cycle, Dodd raised over $7 million. His top five contributors were Bear Stearns, Citigroup, National Westminster Bank, Lehman Brothers, and Goldman Sachs.

The Republican nominee, Jack Orchulli, ran as fiscal conservative and social moderate. He broke ranks with his party on gay marriage and abortion. He often talked about a "broken education system." He argued that Dodd hasn't done anything in his 30 years in Congress to fix such issues as traffic problems in Fairfield County.

Orchulli launched a statewide TV ad campaign in September, as he spent over $1.1 million and pledged to spend "whatever it takes" if polls showed that he was gaining ground on Dodd.

=== Predictions ===
Source	Ranking	As of
Sabato's Crystal Ball	Safe D	November 1, 2004

=== Results ===
General election results
Party	Candidate	Votes	%
Democratic	Chris Dodd (Incumbent)	945,347	66.35%
Republican	Jack Orchulli	457,749	32.13%
Concerned Citizens	Timothy Knibbs	12,442	0.87%
Libertarian	Leonard Rasch	9,188	0.64%
Total votes		1,424,726	100%
Democratic hold			

==== By county ====
County	Christopher Dodd Democratic		Jack Orchulli Republican		Various candidates Other parties		Margin		Total votes cast
County	#	%	#	%	#	%	#	%	Total votes cast
Fairfield	222,523	61.7%	133,982	37.1%	4,291	1.2%	88,541	24.6%	360,796
Hartford	250,482	70.2%	101,132	28.3%	5,123	1.4%	149,350	41.9%	356,737
Litchfield	51,010	57.7%	34,975	39.6%	1,355	2.6%	16,035	18.1%	88,340
Middlesex	53,536	69.0%	23,154	29.8%	949	1.2%	30,382	39.2%	77,639
New Haven	218,571	67.1%	101,720	31.2%	5,257	1.6%	116,851	35.9%	325,548
New London	75,762	70.6%	29,683	27.7%	1,812	1.6%	46,079	42.9%	107,257
Tolland	44,101	67.7%	20,049	30.8%	1,006	1.7%	24,052	35.9%	65,156
Windham	29,362	67.9%	13,054	30.2%	837	1.9%	16,308	37.7%	43,253
Totals	945,347	66.35%	457,749	32.13%	21,630	1.52%	487,598	34.22%	1,424,726

=== By congressional district ===
Dodd won all five congressional districts, including three that elected Republicans.

District	Dodd	Orchulli	Representative
1st	71%	27%	John Larson
2nd	68%	30%	Rob Simmons
3rd	70%	29%	Rosa DeLauro
4th	62%	37%	Chris Shays
5th	60%	38%	Nancy Johnson

== See also ==
- 2004 United States Senate elections
