= 2026 Connecticut gubernatorial election =

- November 3, 2026
- Turnout: 57.38%
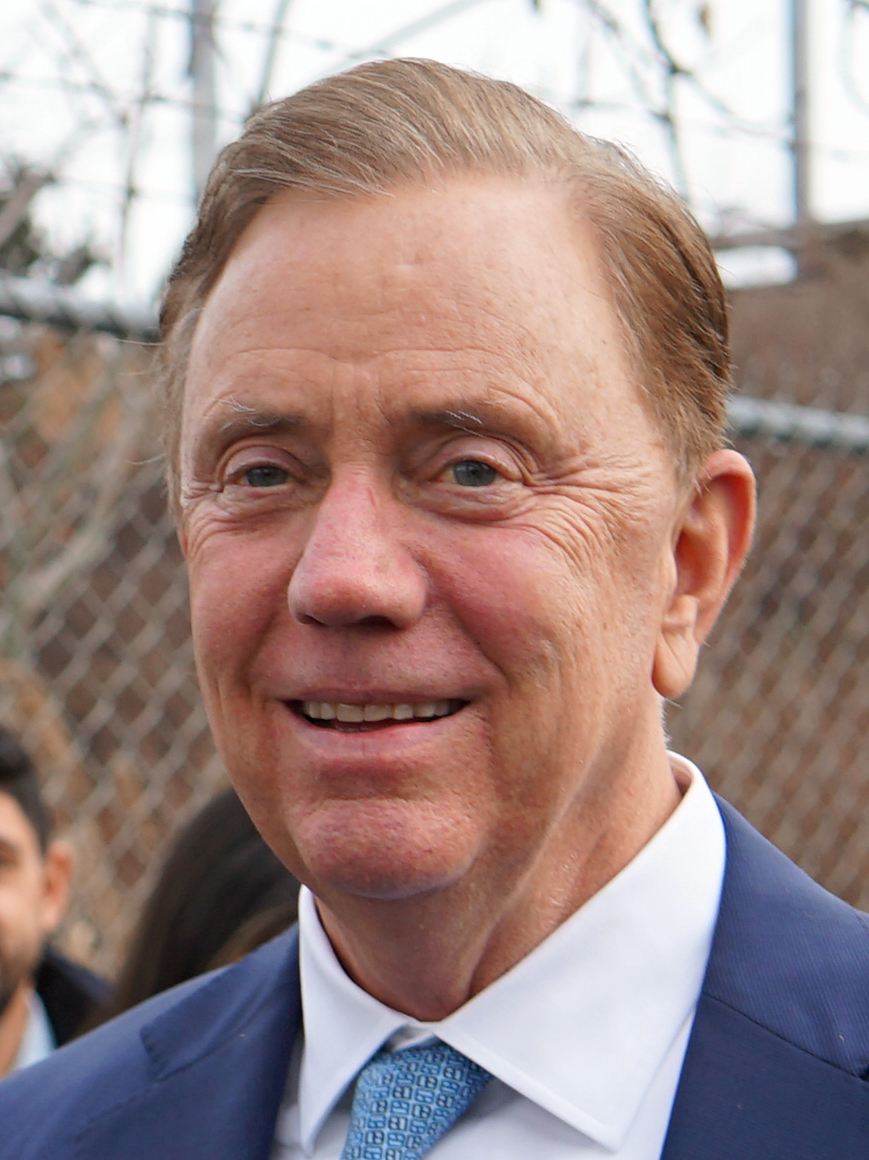

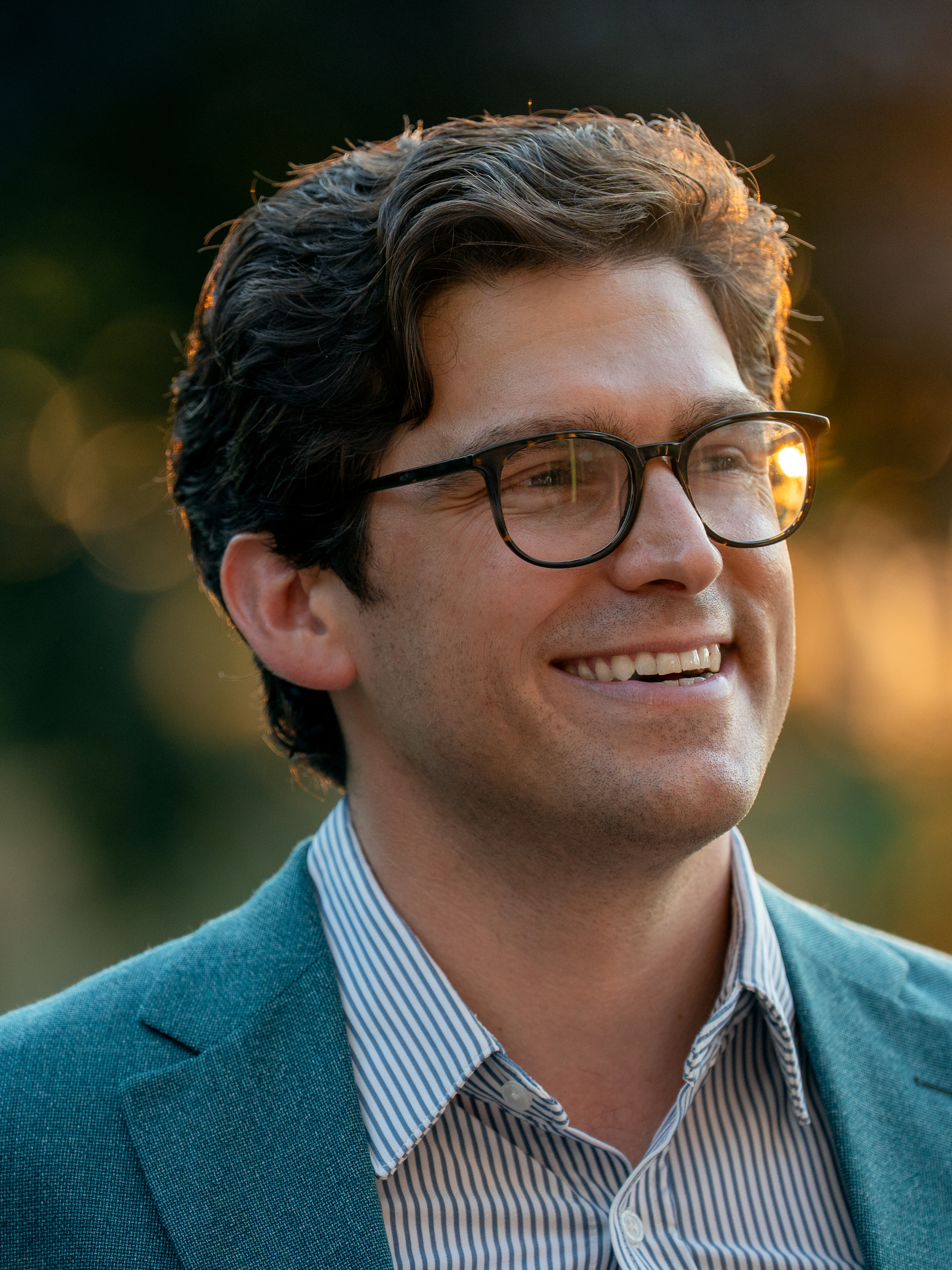
Nominee	Ned Lamont	Ryan Fazio
Party	Democratic	Republican
Alliance	Working Families	Independent Party
Running mate	Susan Bysiewicz	Mathew Corey
Popular vote	773,368	524,757
Percentage	59.58%	40.42%
- Lamont: 50–60% 60–70% 70–80% 80–90% Fazio: 50–60% 60–70%
Governor before election
Ned Lamont
Democratic
Elected Governor
Ned Lamont
Democratic

The 2026 Connecticut gubernatorial election took place on November 3, 2026 to elect the governor of Connecticut. Primary elections took place on August 11, 2026.

Incumbent Democratic governor Ned Lamont won re-election a third term, defeating Republican nominee and state Senator Ryan Fazio. This was the best performance for a Democratic gubernatorial candidate since 1958. Lamont became the first Democrat to win three terms since Wilbur Lucius Cross in 1934.

Lamont had been one of the most popular governors in the United States, with a 63% approval rating as of October 2026, according to Morning Consult; however, a University of New Hampshire poll from May 2025 found that 44% of Connecticut voters believe he should not run for a third term. State representative Josh Elliott challenged Lamont in the primary as a progressive.

== Democratic primary ==
While incumbent governor Ned Lamont initially had expressed doubts about running for a third term, he announced that he would run for re-election in November 2025. State representative Josh Elliott had already launched a bid to primary Lamont, believing that Connecticut needed a more progressive leader.

At the Democratic State Convention on May 16, 2026, at The Bushnell in Hartford, Lamont defeated Elliott for the state party endorsement, 1,468 votes (74.6%) to 501 (25.4%). However, Elliott surpassed the 15% of delegates needed to get on the ballot for the primary, which took place on August 11; Lamont was the first incumbent governor to face a primary since Ella Grasso in 1978.

Lamont would go on to win the primary, and the party's endorsement.

=== Governor ===
==== Candidates ====
===== Nominee =====
- Ned Lamont, incumbent governor (2019–present)

===== Eliminated in primary =====
- Josh Elliott, state representative from HD-88 (2017–present)

===== Declined =====
- Luke Bronin, former mayor of Hartford (2016–2024) (running for U.S. House)
- Susan Bysiewicz, incumbent lieutenant governor (2019–present) (running for re-election)
- William Tong, incumbent attorney general (2019–present) (running for re-election)
- Sean Scanlon, incumbent comptroller (2023–present) (running for re-election)

==== Endorsements ====
Ned Lamont

U.S. senators

- Richard Blumenthal, Connecticut (2011–present)
- Chris Murphy, Connecticut (2013–present)

U.S. representatives

- Joe Courtney, CT-02 (2007–present)
- Rosa DeLauro, CT-03 (1991–present)
- Jahana Hayes, CT-05 (2019–present)
- Jim Himes, CT-04 (2009–present)
- John Larson, CT-01 (1999–present)

Statewide officials

- Erick Russell, treasurer of Connecticut (2023–present)
- Sean Scanlon, Connecticut comptroller (2023–present)
- William Tong, attorney general of Connecticut (2019–present)

State legislators

- 22 state senators
- 71 state representatives

Local officials

- Arunan Arulampalam, mayor of Hartford (2024–present)
- Justin Elicker, mayor of New Haven (2020–present)
- Joe Ganim, mayor of Bridgeport (1991–2003, 2015–present)
- Caroline Simmons, mayor of Stamford (2021–present)

Individuals

- Al Sharpton, civil rights activist

Labor unions

- Connecticut Carpenters
- Connecticut District Laborers' Council
- Connecticut State Building Trades Unions
- Connecticut Teamsters
- Teamsters Local 1150
- UNITE HERE Local 217
- 4 other local Teamsters unions

Organizations

- College Democrats of Connecticut
- Giffords

Political parties

- Democratic Party of Connecticut
Josh Elliott

State legislators

- Saud Anwar, SD-03 (2019–present)
- 6 state representatives (Note: Jason Doucette, HD-13 (2019–present); Nick Gauthier, HD-38 (2025–present); Jillian Gilchrest, HD-18 (2019–present); Anne Hughes, HD-135 (2019–present); Laurie Sweet, HD-91 (2025–present); Steven Winter, HD-94 (2025–present))

Labor unions

- SEIU Local 1973
- New Haven Federation of Teachers

Organizations

- 50501 movement
- Good Trouble-Indivisible Norwalk
- Sunrise New Haven

==== Polling ====
Poll source	Date(s) administered	Sample size (Note: Key: A – all adults RV – registered voters LV – likely voters V – unclear)	Margin of error	Ned Lamont	Josh Elliott	Other	Undecided
Sacred Heart University/WFSB/CT Insider	July 21–26, 2026	374 (LV)	± 3.1%	57%	22%	1% (Note: "Prefer not to answer" with 1%)	20%
Change Research (D) (Note: Poll sponsored by Impact CT)	July 23–26, 2026	859 (LV)	± 3.4%	48%	27%	1% (Note: "Would not vote" with 1%)	24%
University of New Hampshire	June 18–23, 2026	286 (LV)	± 5.8%	53%	23%	1% (Note: "Write in Someone Else" with 1%)	24%
Change Research (D) (Note: Poll sponsored by Impact CT)	May 28–29, 2026	887 (LV)	± 3.4%	58%	20%	–	22%
University of New Hampshire	April 16–20, 2026	177 (LV)	± 7.3%	52%	18%	–	30%
University of New Hampshire	February 12–16, 2026	174 (LV)	± 7.4%	57%	13%	1% (Note: "Another candidate" with 1%)	29%
University of New Hampshire	November 13–17, 2025	235 (LV)	± 6.4%	55%	7%	2% (Note: 'Write in someone else' with 2%)	37%

==== Convention ====
May 16, 2026 Democratic convention results
Party	Candidate	Votes	%
Democratic	Ned Lamont (incumbent)	1,468	74.6
Democratic	Josh Elliott	501	25.4
Total votes		1,969	100.0%

==== Results ====
Results by municipality: Lamont: 50–60%; 60–70%; 70–80%; 80–90%; Elliott: 50–60%; 60–70%

Democratic primary results
Party	Candidate	Votes	%
Democratic	Ned Lamont (incumbent)	126,497	67.9
Democratic	Josh Elliott	59,849	32.1
Total votes		186,346	100.0

=== Lieutenant governor ===
==== Candidates ====
===== Nominee =====
- Susan Bysiewicz, incumbent lieutenant governor (2019–present)

==== Endorsements ====
Susan Bysiewicz

Labor unions

- Teamsters Local 1150
- UNITE HERE Local 217
- 4 other Teamsters unions

Organizations

- EMILYs List
- National Women's Political Caucus

== Republican primary ==
=== Governor ===
At the Republican State Convention on May 16, 2026, at Mohegan Sun in Uncasville, state Sen. Ryan Fazio (R-Greenwich) won the party's endorsement with approximately 92% of delegate votes on the first ballot. Former New York Lt. Gov. Betsy McCaughey received about 8% of the vote, falling well short of the 15% threshold needed to force an August primary, and quickly endorsed Fazio.

In the following months before the convention, Erin Stewart, the former mayor of New Britain, was seen as the frontrunner in a tight race with Fazio. Just a day before the May 15th convention, Stewart suspended her campaign amid reports of alleged misuse of a New Britain city credit card for over $200,000 in personal expenses. Stewart subsequently endorsed Fazio.

==== Candidates ====
===== Nominee =====
- Ryan Fazio, state senator from the 36th district (2021–present)

===== Eliminated at convention =====
- Betsy McCaughey, former lieutenant governor of New York (1995–1998) and candidate for governor of New York in 1998 (endorsed Fazio)

===== Withdrawn =====
- Jennifer Tooker, former first selectwoman of Westport (2021–2025) (running for state comptroller)
- Erin Stewart, former mayor of New Britain (2013–2025) and candidate for lieutenant governor in 2018 (endorsed Fazio)

===== Declined =====
- Matthew Corey, bar owner and perennial candidate (running for lieutenant governor)
- Rob Sampson, state senator from the 16th district (2019–present) (endorsed Fazio)

==== Endorsements ====
Ryan Fazio

Statewide officials

- Betsy McCaughey, former lieutenant governor of New York (1995–1998) and former gubernatorial candidate

State legislators

- Vincent Candelora, minority leader of the House of Representatives (2021–present) from HD-86 (2007–present)
- Stephen Harding, minority leader of the State Senate (2024–present) from SD-30 (2023–present)
- 5 state senators (Note: Eric Berthel, SD-32 (2019–present); Paul Cicarella, SD-34 (2021–present); John Kissel, SD-07 (1993–present); Rob Sampson, SD-16 (2019–present); Heather Somers, SD-18 (2017–present))
- 11 state representatives (Note: Seth Bronko, HD-70 (2023–present); Patrick Callahan, HD-108 (2021–present); Joseph Canino, HD-65 (2025–present); Irene Haines, HD-34 (2019–present); Carol Hall, HD-59 (2017–present); Greg Howard, HD-43 (2021–present); Nicole Klarides-Ditria, HD-105 (2017–present); Gale Mastrofrancesco, HD-80 (2019–present); Tom O'Dea, HD-125 (2013–present); Joseph Polletta, HD-68 (2017–present); Steve Weir, HD-55 (2022–present))

Local officials

- Erin Stewart, former mayor of New Britain (2013–2025) and former gubernatorial candidate

Organizations

- Connecticut Young Republicans
Betsy McCaughey (withdrawn)

Statewide officials

- George Pataki, former governor of New York (1995–2006)
Erin Stewart (withdrawn)

State legislators

- Kevin Witkos, former SD-08 (2009–2023)
- 5 state representatives (Note: Tim Ackert, HD-08 (2011–present); Devin Carney, HD-23 (2015–present); Tom Delnicki, HD-14 (2017–present); Joe Hoxha, HD-78 (2023–present); Donna Veach, HD-30 (2021–present))

==== Polling ====
Hypothetical polling

Poll source	Date(s) administered	Sample size	Margin of error	Ryan Fazio	Erin Stewart	Other	Undecided
OnMessage Inc. (R) (Note: Poll sponsored by Stewart's campaign)	August 11–14, 2025	400 (LV)	± 4.9%	13%	42%	10%	35%

=== Lieutenant governor ===
==== Candidates ====
===== Nominee =====
- Matthew Corey, bar owner and perennial candidate

===== Failed at convention =====
- Tim Ackert, state representative from the 8th district

== Third-party candidates and independent candidates ==
=== Write-in candidates ===
- Christian Noe
  - Running mate: Michael S. Grant
- Zenobia Adgers
  - Running mate: Rick Adgers
- Lee Whitnum
  - Running mate: David Spirt

== General election ==
=== Debates ===
2026 Connecticut gubernatorial election debates and forums
No.	Date	Host	Moderator	Link	Democratic	Republican
Key: P Participant A Absent N Not invited I Invited W Withdrawn						
Key: P Participant A Absent N Not invited I Invited W Withdrawn					Lamont	Fazio
1	October 22, 2026	WFSB/CT Insider	Susan Raff; Dan Haar	YouTube	P	P
2	October 27, 2026	WTNH/Connecticut Conference of Municipalities	Dennis House; Kathryn Hauser	YouTube	P	P

=== Predictions ===
Source	Ranking	As of
The Cook Political Report	Solid D	October 29, 2026
Decision Desk HQ	Likely D	November 3, 2026
Fox News	Solid D	November 1, 2026
Inside Elections	Solid D	October 29, 2026
NBC News	Solid D	November 3, 2026
RealClearPolitics	Solid D	November 1, 2026
Sabato's Crystal Ball	Safe D	November 2, 2026
Silver Bulletin	Solid D	November 3, 2026

=== Post-primary endorsements ===
Ned Lamont (D)

Organizations

- Everytown for Gun Safety
Ryan Fazio (R)

Organizations

- Independent Party of Connecticut

=== Polling ===
Aggregate polls

Source of poll aggregation	Dates administered	Dates updated	Ned Lamont (D)	Ryan Fazio (R)	Other/Undecided (Note: Calculated by taking the difference of 100% and all other candidates combined.)	Margin
270toWin	October 14 – November 1, 2026	November 2, 2026	56.4%	37.0%	6.6%	Lamont +19.4%
RealClearPolitics	October 6 – October 31, 2026	November 2, 2026	54.8%	37.5%	7.7%	Lamont +17.3%
Silver Bulletin	June 18 – October 31, 2026	November 2, 2026	55.4%	38.5%	6.1%	Lamont +16.9%
Average			55.5%	37.7%	6.8%	Lamont +17.8%

Poll source	Date(s) administered	Sample size	Margin of error	Ned Lamont (D)	Ryan Fazio (R)	Other	Undecided
University of New Hampshire	October 27–31, 2026	1,025 (LV)	± 3.1%	54%	41%	2% (Note: "Another candidate" with 2%)	4%
Emerson College (Note: Poll sponsored by Nexstar Media.)	October 10–12, 2026	800 (LV)	± 3.5%	51%	38%	—	11%
Quinnipiac University	October 8–12, 2026	1,225 (LV)	± 3.8%	58%	38%	2% (Note: "Refuse to respond" with 2%)	1%
Wesleyan University/YouGov (Note: Poll conducted in partnership with The Connecticut Project and The Connecticut Mirror)	October 8–12, 2026	1,000 (RV)	± 4.54%	53%	32%	4% (Note: "I would not vote in this race" with 4%; "Other" with 0%)	11%
Wesleyan University/YouGov	October 8–12, 2026	(LV)	–	57%	34%	0% (Note: "I would not vote in this race" & "Other with 0%)	8%
GreatBlue Research (Note: Poll sponsored by CT Insider, Sacred Heart University and WFSB)	October 6–12, 2026	1,000 (RV)	± 3.1%	53%	31%	—	15%
GreatBlue Research	October 6–12, 2026	1,000 (RV)	± 3.1%	56% (Note: With voters who lean towards a given candidate)	33%	—	11%
University of New Hampshire	September 17–21, 2026	540 (LV)	± 4.2%	55%	38%	1% (Note: "Another candidate" with 1%)	6%
co/efficient (R)	September 16–17, 2026	979 (LV)	± 3.1%	48%	41%	—	11%
Quinnipiac University	September 8–14, 2026	1,288 (LV)	± 3.8%	55%	38%	2% (Note: "Refuse to respond" with 2%)	5%
GreatBlue Research	September 1–8, 2026	1,000 (RV)	± 3.1%	48%	34%	0% (Note: "Another candidate" with 0%)	18%
GreatBlue Research	September 1–8, 2026	1,000 (RV)	± 3.1%	52% (Note: With voters who lean towards a given candidate)	37%	–	11%
University of New Hampshire	August 20–24, 2026	809 (LV)	± 3.4%	52%	37%	3% (Note: "Write in someone else" with 3%)	9%
Sacred Heart University/WFSB/CT Insider	July 21–26, 2026	1,000 (RV)	± 3.1%	50%	30%	1% (Note: "Another candidate" with 1%)	20%
University of New Hampshire	June 18–23, 2026	828 (LV)	± 3.4%	49%	36%	2% (Note: "Write in someone else" with 2%)	12%

Hypothetical polling

Josh Elliott vs. Ryan Fazio

Poll source	Date(s) administered	Sample size	Margin of error	Josh Elliott (D)	Ryan Fazio (R)	Other	Undecided
Sacred Heart University/WFSB/CT Insider	July 21–26, 2026	1,000 (RV)	± 3.1%	44%	30%	1%	26%

Ned Lamont vs. Erin Stewart

Poll source	Date(s) administered	Sample size	Margin of error	Ned Lamont (D)	Erin Stewart (R)	Undecided
OnMessage Inc. (R)	August 2025	600 (LV)	–	50%	42%	8%

=== Results ===
Council of government results: Lamont 50–60 60–70 / Fazio 50–60

2026 Connecticut gubernatorial election
Party	Candidate	Votes	%	±%
Democratic	Ned Lamont; Susan Bysiewicz	742,438	57.26	
Working Families	Ned Lamont; Susan Bysiewicz	29,820	2.30	
Total	Ned Lamont (incumbent); Susan Bysiewicz (incumbent)	772,258	59.56	
Republican	Ryan Fazio; Matt Corey	496,466	38.29	
Independent Party	Ryan Fazio; Matt Corey	27,766	2.14	
Total	Ryan Fazio; Matt Corey	524,232	40.43	
Write-in		64	0.01	
Total votes		1,296,554	100.0	

== See also ==
- 2026 United States elections
- 2026 Connecticut elections

== Notes ==
Partisan clients
