= Danbury Trashers =

Professional minor-league ice hockey team

- City: Danbury, Connecticut
- League: UHL
- Founded: 2004
- Folded: 2006; 20 years ago
- Home arena: Danbury Ice Arena
- Colors: Blue, Black, Silver, White
- Owner(s): James Galante
- General manager: A.J. Galante
- Head coach: Paul Gillis; Todd Stirling

Franchise history
- 2004–2006: Danbury Trashers

The Danbury Trashers were a United Hockey League (UHL) professional ice hockey team located in Danbury, Connecticut, first established in 2004 as an expansion team. The team was named for its owner's business in waste management; James Galante purchased the franchising rights for $500,000 and named his 17-year-old son, A. J., president and general manager. As part of the franchising agreement, Galante invested an additional $1.5 million to upgrade the team's home arena, Danbury Ice Arena, from a 750-seat facility to a 3,000-seat venue.

In their first season, the Trashers quickly gained notoriety for their bullish, physical style of play, setting a league record for penalty minutes. The season witnessed two separate brawls and multiple player suspensions. Danbury finished second in its division and was eliminated in the playoffs by the Muskegon Fury, the eventual Colonial Cup champions. In their second year, the Trashers won the Eastern Division and reached the finals, but lost the championship to the Kalamazoo Wings, handing them their only loss of the playoffs.

At the end of the team's second season, Galante was arrested on 72 criminal charges, including conspiracy to violate the Racketeer Influenced and Corrupt Organizations Act (RICO). He pleaded guilty, was sentenced to 87 months in prison, and had to forfeit his ownership interests in 25 trash-hauling companies. During the same time, the Trashers disbanded, citing financial concerns including travel costs.

== History ==
=== Founding ===
The Danbury Trashers were founded as an expansion team in the United Hockey League (UHL) on April 1, 2004, by James Galante, a garbage disposal mogul, who paid a $500,000 franchise fee to the league. Galante had considered investing in the New Haven Knights prior to the franchise folding. He purchased the franchising rights after seeing the enthusiasm for hockey in Danbury at his son A.J.'s high school games. He also wanted to give A.J. experience in how to manage a professional sports franchise, naming him president and general manager. A.J. was a 17-year-old high school student at the time and according to UHL commissioner Richard Brosal, some around the league thought it was an April Fools' Day joke. After graduating high school, Galante attended Manhattanville College while maintaining his organizational duties.

The new team was named the Trashers, a reference to the elder Galante's main business, with the logo being designed by A.J.'s friends. The Trashers were to play in the Danbury Ice Arena, a 750-seat ice rink, used for the local hockey leagues. As part of the franchising agreement the arena needed the maximum capacity expanded. Galante invested an additional $1.5 million to renovate the arena, turning it into a 3,000 seat facility.

Galante envisioned a physical team with a "bad-boy image" and to become the "Evil Empire of the UHL". To that end he brought in tough guys Garrett Burnett, Rumun Ndur, and Brad Wingfield, who previously set a UHL record for penalty minutes (PIMs) during the 2002–03 season with 576. He also brought in skill players such as Jim Duhart, who led the UHL in scoring the previous season, former National Hockey League (NHL) player Brent Gretzky, and Michael Rupp, who played for the team during the 2004–05 NHL lockout. For goaltending Galante acquired Scott Stirling, who was the Most Valuable Player of the ECHL the previous season. As for the coaches, Todd Stirling, son of former New York Islanders head coach Steve Stirling and brother of Scott, was named head coach. A.J.'s former high school head coach, Bob Stearns, was hired as an assistant coach. After the team had been assembled The Hockey News picked the Trashers to finish second in the league.

=== UHL seasons (2004–2006) ===
The Trashers first season began with the team playing around .500 hockey. Then a quarter of the way through the 2004–05 season they went on a seven-game unbeaten streak that moved them into first place in the Eastern Division. The streak was part of nine consecutive games without a regulation loss. This lifted the Trashers into a tie for first place in the league. During the winning streak one of two brawls of the season occurred. In a game against the Kalamazoo Wings on December 1, Wingfield attempted to instigate a fight after an altercation with a Wings player. The player refused to fight, but as Wingfield skated away the player grabbed Wingfield's jersey and pulled him back over an outstretched leg. Wingfield's skate caught on the ice as he fell backwards breaking his ankle. The play incited a brawl, in which Ndur fought with two players, attempted to kick a linesman, and charged the Wings bench, before the officials were able to subdue him. His actions led to a 20-game suspension by the league, while the Kalamazoo player received five games. Upset with the officiating, James Galante went down to ice level to voice his opinion. Galante entered the ice via the penalty box where he got into a shouting match with a linesman and allegedly punched him. For his actions Galante was charged with misdemeanor assault and fined by the UHL for leaving the owner's box. The UHL stated that because of the disturbances on the ice they could not determine what actually happened. The linesman was suspended for five games for his part in the altercation. He later asked that the assault charges against Galante be dropped. After this request, prosecutors still intended to pursue the charges, but eventually dropped them citing a lack of evidence. After the brawl, the Trashers went 8–2–0 in their next 10 games. A second brawl occurred months later in a game versus the Adirondack Frostbite. At the end of the brawl, the Trashers' Chad Wagner was being removed from the ice by the linesmen when he broke away, and attacked the Adirondack bench, grabbing their head coach, Marc Potvin. Compounding the issue, two other Trashers players left the penalty box and skated towards the bench. A third player sucker punched an opponent, breaking his nose. For his part in the brawl, Wagner was banned from the UHL while the two players, who left the penalty box, received 5 and 10 game suspensions, respectively, and the third player was suspended for the remainder of the season and playoffs. Head coach Stirling was also suspended three games for not being able to control his players. It was the sixteenth time the league had suspended a Trashers player. Danbury again found success after the brawl going 8–3–0 in their next 11 games. On February 23, 2005, the Trashers again hosted the Adirondack Frostbite. World Wrestling Entertainment superstar John Cena was on hand for what resembled more of a WWE event than a hockey game. The teams combined for 106 penalty minutes in the first period and 6 game-misconducts were issued in the first 10 minutes of the game. The Trashers would go on to win the game 4–2. The Trashers struggled towards the end of the season having both a four and three game losing streak and posting a 2–6–2 record. Danbury finished the regular season with 95 points, second place in the Eastern Division, nine points behind Adirondack. They also set a UHL record PIMs at 2,776. In the first round of the playoffs, they faced off against the Frostbite, winning the series in six games. In the second round, Danbury faced the Muskegon Fury, who led the Central Division with 111 points. The Trashers were eliminated in five games by Muskegon, who went on to win the league championship, the Colonial Cup. At season's end the Trashers were announced the winners of the UHL's Merchandiser of the Year Award.

In the off-season the Trashers changed head coaches, bringing in Paul Gillis, who had coached the Quad City Mallards the previous season. Stirling remained with the team in a scouting and consulting role. They also brought in a new goaltender, Sylvain Daigle, who had won three Colonial Cups with the Fury. Daigle was taken by the Port Huron Flags in an expansion draft and traded to Danbury for their top goal scorer Mike Bayrack. They also reached an agreement to have all of their games broadcast on local ESPN Radio affiliated stations and to have select games broadcast on tape delay locally on Comcast Cable.

The Trashers began the season with two shootout games, winning one and losing the other. Despite earning three out of a possible four points, Gillis was unhappy with the team's performance. His concerns were later proved accurate as Danbury started the year with a 4–5–2 record. The Trashers hovered around the .500 mark going into December where they started the month with a six-game win streak that brought them within five points of first place in Eastern Division. They finished December without a regulation loss going 11–0–3. Danbury finished the season strong with a seven-game win streak in March and finished the year on a six-game win streak. The winning steaks helped Danbury win the Eastern Division finishing with 107 points, nine ahead of Adirondack.

In the first round the Trashers faced off against Gillis's former team, the Mallards. Although the Trashers began the playoffs as the second seed, they had lost both regular season match-ups with the Mallards. Danbury lost the first two games of the seven-game series at home and were facing Games 3–5 on the road. The Trashers won Games 3 and 4 to tie the series before losing game five. Facing elimination, Danbury won the final two games to win the series in seven games and advance to the second round. The second round was a rematch with Muskegon. The Trashers took a 3–2 series lead into Game 6, which went to triple-overtime before Danbury finally eliminated the defending champions. In the finals, the Trashers faced the Kalamazoo Wings, who had not lost a game in the playoffs. Danbury lost Game 1 of the series, but rebounded to defeat the Wings in Game 2. It proved to be the only game that the Wings lost in the postseason that year, as they won the next three games to capture the championship. During the finals, Daigle set a UHL record for most saves in a single playoff year with 511.

=== Controversy and end of the Trashers ===
In June 2006, James Galante was charged with 72 various charges including racketeering. One of the charges that pertained directly to the Trashers was wire fraud, which resulted from the interstate faxing of fraudulent salary cap documents. The Trashers had circumvented the UHL’s $275,000 annual salary cap by giving players or their wives no-show positions within one of the disposal companies or giving them housing allowance checks for sums which had already been paid. Estimates were that the Trashers had exceeded the salary cap by $475,000 making the total payroll closer to $750,000. For his part in aiding with violating the salary cap, former head coach Stirling was also charged with wire fraud. He pleaded guilty and was given five years probation. Galante pleaded guilty to one count of conspiring to violate the federal Racketeer Influenced and Corrupt Organizations Act (RICO), one count of conspiring to defraud the Internal Revenue Service, and one count of conspiring to commit wire fraud. He was sentenced to 87 months of imprisonment and had to forfeit his ownership interests in 25 trash hauling companies, a Southbury residence, six racing cars, a trailer used to haul them, and $448,153.10 in cash seized from his business office and home.

Amid the controversy, the Trashers disbanded. Adirondack failed to secure an arena lease and disbanded with their closest geographical competitor gone. Danbury folded over financial concerns, including travel costs. The players from both Danbury and Adirondack were placed into a dispersal draft and selected by the remaining teams in the UHL. Afterwards, the Danbury market was served by a string of short-lived teams; as of 2023 only the Danbury Hat Tricks (Federal Prospects Hockey League) play at Danbury Ice Arena.

== In popular culture ==
The story of James Galante and the Danbury Trashers was covered in the 2021 Netflix documentary Untold: Crimes & Penalties. It will be the subject of a feature film, titled The Trashers, from director Cooper Raiff, with David Harbour and Cooper Hoffman set to star as James and AJ Galante.

The story of the Trashers was also the subject of the Novel podcast series The Fighty Pucks.

== See also ==
- Professional ice hockey in Connecticut
