= John Hetherington =

John Hetherington may refer to:

- John Hetherington (author), Australian journalist, author and military historian
- John Hetherington (haberdasher), apocryphal English haberdasher
- John Hetherington (Connecticut politician), member of the Connecticut House of Representatives
- John Hetherington (mayor), mayor of Brisbane, Queensland, Australia
- John Hetherington & Sons, a textile machinery manufacturer in Manchester, England
