= Catherine Parker =

Catherine Parker (or variants) may refer to:

- Catherine Parker (politician), American politician from Connecticut
- K Langloh Parker, Australian writer
- Katharine Parker, Australian composer
- Katherine Vose Parker, American politician
- Kathy Parker Phillips, née Parker
- Kathy Parker, American actress

== See also ==
- Katy Parker (disambiguation)
- Kate Parker (disambiguation)
