= Louis DeLuca =

American politician (1933–2023)

Minority Leader of the Connecticut State Senate
- In office 2001–2007
- Preceded by: M. Adela Eads
- Succeeded by: John McKinney

Member of the Connecticut State Senate from the 32nd district
- In office January 9, 1991 – November 30, 2007
- Preceded by: James H. "Jamie" McLaughlin
- Succeeded by: Rob Kane

Personal details
- Born: August 17, 1933 Everett, Massachusetts, U.S.
- Died: July 28, 2023 (aged 89)
- Party: Republican
- Spouse: Alice DeLuca
- Children: 4
- Occupation: Businessman

Louis DeLuca (August 17, 1933 – July 28, 2023) was an American businessman and a Republican Party politician. He served as the state senator for the 32nd District of Connecticut until November 30, 2007.

== Political career ==
Louis DeLuca was born in Everett, Massachusetts. He was elected to the senate in 1990, representing Bethlehem, Bridgewater, Middlebury, Oxford, Roxbury, Seymour, Southbury, Thomaston, Watertown and Woodbury. He served as Senate Minority Leader in the Connecticut State Senate from 2002 to 2007.

DeLuca assisted in the successful effort to ban MTBE from Connecticut's gasoline supplies. For his efforts, he received environmental awards from the Housatonic Valley Association and the Pomperaug Watershed Coalition.

DeLuca announced his opposition to the proposal of Governor Jodi Rell to increase the state income tax to pay for added education funding.

=== Scandal ===
On June 1, 2007, DeLuca was arrested upon allegations that he asked James Galante, a businessman linked to a garbage corruption scandal, to intervene in a domestic abuse problem of a family member. Galante is reported to have paid Matthew Ianniello of the Genovese crime family $120,000 a year in protection money for his Connecticut and Westchester Country trash-hauling routes.

On June 4, 2007, DeLuca pleaded guilty to a misdemeanor threatening charge, received a suspended sentence, and was ordered to pay a fine. On June 12, 2007, he announced he would step down as leader of the Senate Republicans and was replaced by 28th District Senator John McKinney, son of late Congressman Stewart McKinney.

A special senate committee was convened to determine if DeLuca should be officially sanctioned. One Republican state senator, David Cappiello, called on DeLuca to resign his seat.

On October 15, 2007, DeLuca testified in front of the committee investigating him, acknowledging under oath that he asked Galante to threaten his grandson-in-law and that he also knowingly had lied to FBI officers when they questioned him during their investigation. He also told the committee that he reported to Waterbury Chief of Police Neil O'Leary of his granddaughter's alleged abuse but the chief refused to investigate the claim. O'Leary, in response, said that he is willing to testify under oath in front of the committee to give his side of the story.

On November 13, 2007, DeLuca announced his resignation from the Senate, effective November 30, 2007.

Watertown councilman Rob Kane, a Republican, was elected in a January 15, 2008, special election to serve out the balance of DeLuca's term.

== Death ==
DeLuca died on July 28, 2023, at the age of 89.
