= Nancy Beals =

American politician (born 1938)

Member of the Connecticut House of Representatives from the 88th district
- In office January 6, 1993 – January 8, 2003
- Preceded by: Curtis Andrews Jr.
- Succeeded by: J. Brendan Sharkey

Personal details
- Born: July 21, 1938 (age 88) El Paso, Texas, U.S.
- Party: Democratic

Nancy Beals (born July 21, 1938) is an American politician who served in the Connecticut House of Representatives from the 88th district from 1993 to 2003.
