= Paul Gillis =

Canadian ice hockey player

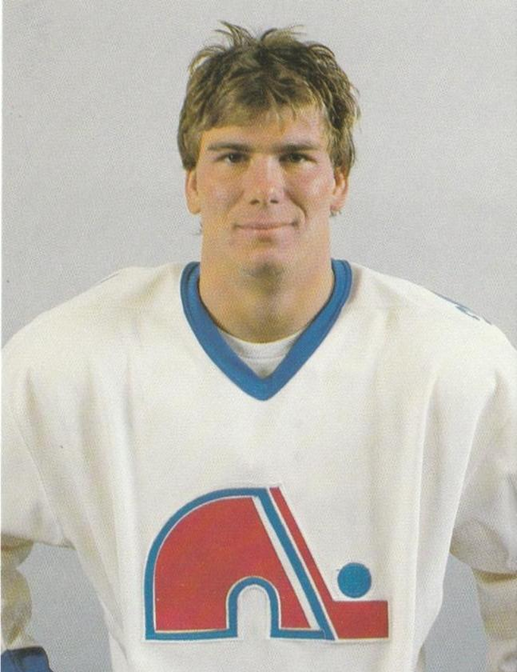
- Gillis in 1985 photo
- Born: December 31, 1963 (age 62) Toronto, Ontario, Canada
- Height: 5 ft 11 in (180 cm)
- Weight: 190 lb (86 kg; 13 st 8 lb)
- Position: Centre
- Shot: Left
- Played for: Quebec Nordiques; Chicago Blackhawks; Hartford Whalers
- NHL draft: 34th overall, 1982; Quebec Nordiques
- Playing career: 1983–1993

Paul Christopher Gillis (born December 31, 1963) is a Canadian former professional ice hockey forward. He played in the National Hockey League with the Quebec Nordiques, Chicago Blackhawks and Hartford Whalers between 1982 and 1993.

== Playing career ==
Born in Toronto, Ontario, Gillis is the brother of Mike Gillis. As a youth, he played in the 1976 Quebec International Pee-Wee Hockey Tournament with a minor ice hockey team from Toronto.

Gillis started his National Hockey League career with the Quebec Nordiques in 1983. He also played for the Chicago Blackhawks and Hartford Whalers. He left the NHL after the 1993 season.

== Coaching career ==
Gillis began his coaching career with the Springfield Falcons of the American Hockey League (AHL) in 1994–95, followed by two years as head coach of the Windsor Spitfires of the Ontario Hockey League (OHL). Gillis then led the Quad City Mallards to a United Hockey League (UHL) championship in 1997–98 with a remarkable 55–18–1 regular-season record. After a brief stint back in the OHL, Gillis returned to the UHL as head coach of the New Haven Knights for two years, and then returned to Quad City where he guided the Mallards to the UHL finals again in 2002–03. He moved on to the Danbury Trashers and in 2005–06 made his third trip to the UHL finals, before coaching the Elmira Jackals for the final 28 games of the 2006–07 season.

In the spring of 2007, Gillis was named as the third head coach in the Odessa Jackalopes' 12-year history, and his impact was immediate. Gillis led the Jackalopes back to the CHL postseason after the team missed out entirely in the 2006–07 campaign.

In 14 years as a coach, Gillis finished with a winning record 10 times.

== Career statistics ==
=== Regular season and playoffs ===
			Regular season					Playoffs
Season	Team	League	GP	G	A	Pts	PIM	GP	G	A	Pts	PIM
1979–80	St. Michael's Buzzers	MJBHL	44	20	36	56	114	—	—	—	—	—
1980–81	Niagara Falls Flyers	OHL	59	14	19	33	165	—	—	—	—	—
1981–82	Niagara Falls Flyers	OHL	65	27	62	89	247	5	1	5	6	26
1982–83	Quebec Nordiques	NHL	7	0	2	2	2	—	—	—	—	—
1982–83	North Bay Centennials	OHL	61	34	52	86	151	6	1	3	4	26
1983–84	Quebec Nordiques	NHL	57	8	9	17	59	1	0	0	0	2
1983–84	Fredericton Express	AHL	18	7	8	15	47	—	—	—	—	—
1984–85	Quebec Nordiques	NHL	77	14	28	42	168	18	1	7	8	73
1985–86	Quebec Nordiques	NHL	80	19	24	43	203	3	0	2	2	14
1986–87	Quebec Nordiques	NHL	76	13	26	39	267	13	2	4	6	65
1987–88	Quebec Nordiques	NHL	80	7	10	17	164	—	—	—	—	—
1988–89	Quebec Nordiques	NHL	79	15	25	40	163	—	—	—	—	—
1989–90	Quebec Nordiques	NHL	71	8	14	22	234	—	—	—	—	—
1990–91	Quebec Nordiques	NHL	49	3	8	11	91	2	0	0	0	2
1990–91	Chicago Blackhawks	NHL	13	0	5	5	53	2	0	0	0	2
1991–92	Chicago Blackhawks	NHL	2	0	0	0	6	—	—	—	—	—
1991–92	Indianapolis Ice	IHL	42	10	15	25	170	—	—	—	—	—
1991–92	Hartford Whalers	NHL	12	0	2	2	48	5	0	1	1	0
1992–93	Hartford Whalers	NHL	21	1	1	2	40	—	—	—	—	—
NHL totals			624	88	154	242	1498	44	3	14	17	158
