= James Galante =

American convicted felon (born 1953)

- Born: January 5, 1953 (age 73); New York City, New York, U.S.
- Occupation: Mobster
- Allegiance: Genovese crime family
- Convictions: Tax evasion (1999); Racketeering and conspiracy to commit wire fraud (2008)
- Penalty: 12 months and a day Seven years' imprisonment

James Galante (born January 5, 1953) is an American associate of the Genovese crime family, owner of the defunct Danbury Trashers minor-league hockey team and a defunct racecar team fielding cars for Ted Christopher, and ex-CEO of Automated Waste Disposal (AWD), a company that held waste disposal contracts for most of western Connecticut and Westchester and Putnam counties in New York.

In June 2008, Galante admitted to charges of racketeering, conspiracy to commit wire fraud, and defrauding the Internal Revenue Service, and faced between five and seven years in prison under Federal Sentencing Guidelines, and was also forced to forfeit his controlling interest in 25 different garbage-related businesses, estimated to be worth over $100 million. He was released in 2014 after serving seven years in prison.

== Automated Waste Disposal (AWD) ==
Galante was the owner of 25 different trash disposal businesses based out of Danbury, Connecticut and estimated to be worth over $100 million. The businesses handled 80 percent of garbage hauling in southern and western Connecticut, and Westchester and Putnam counties in New York. Since 1993, they have been accused of muscling out local competition through no-bid-contracts and payments of up to $120,000 per year to Genovese crime family boss Matthew "Matty the Horse" Ianniello. As a result, municipalities, businesses and residents paid artificially inflated carting prices for years. In 1999, Galante was sentenced to 12 months and a day in federal prison after pleading guilty to tax evasion.

=== Investigation and indictment ===
In 2006, federal authorities infiltrated Automated Waste Disposal with an undercover agent and taped hours of phone conversations, precipitating a raid on AWD offices in Danbury and Galante's home in New Fairfield, Connecticut, acquiring trailers full of documents. In June 2006, Galante was issued a 98-count indictment describing Galante as a man who ran an illegal enterprise by carving up the garbage business in western Connecticut and Putnam County and using mob muscle to strong-arm any competitors who might get in his way. Among those also indicted as a result of the investigation were former Waterbury Mayor Joseph Santopietro, former Division Manager for Diversified Waste and Genovese Crime Family enforcer Robert Taggett, federal Drug Enforcement Agent Louis Angioletti, several of Galante's underlings and former Danbury Trashers hockey coach H. Todd Stirling.

Galante was charged in 93 counts of the indictment, with various alleged violations of federal law, including racketeering, racketeering conspiracy, Hobbs Act extortion, mail and wire fraud, witness tampering, tax fraud and conspiracy charges. The indictment included allegations that Galante and others conspired to commit arson and kidnapping by damaging a truck owned by one of Galante's competitors and by kidnapping the driver of that truck at gunpoint.

As the 33 men involved in the case were summarily indicted and tried, authorities confirmed Ianniello was paid a quarterly "mob tax" of $30,000 for his services, and like almost every other defendant in the case, the bagman responsible for delivering the money and Ianniello pleaded guilty, Ianniello to racketeering and interfering with a federal grand jury probe with a sentence of between one and a half to two years in prison. Galante was indicted in 2006 on charges of paying a 'mob tax' to Ianniello.

=== Plea and sentencing ===
Although he initially entered a plea of not guilty, in June 2008, Galante agreed to a change-of-plea hearing. Galante acknowledged that he defrauded the IRS, including writing double paychecks for some employees and having them return one of them to him in cash, claiming items he purchased for his girlfriend's horse farm including hay and a wide-screen television as business expenses, and skimming cash from the register at the Danbury garbage transfer station.

Galante also agreed to forfeit his stake in 25 trash hauling and recycling companies to the federal government, and promised to never work in the business again, stating to the judge that he agreed to "withdraw" from involvement "with any segment of the trash industry in the United States." The 25 trash-disposal companies owned by Galante, all based in Danbury and estimated by him to be worth $100 million, were "condemned and forfeited to the United States of America." The businesses were sold, with the money going to the United States Department of the Treasury, under laws allowing the forfeiture of property obtained through criminal activities.

The government sold the companies, estimated to be worth $100 million, on the condition that the government would return $10.75 million to Galante as a portion of his share of more than $40 million in loans he and his wife made to the businesses over the years, and Galante would keep EnviroServices Inc., a waste collection, transfer, and disposal business in Virginia, with subsidiaries in Virginia, Maryland, New Jersey, West Virginia, and Kentucky. Galante was initially paid only $7.6 million. After claims that the government violated the plea agreement, Galante was given the remaining $3.1 million.

Galante also agreed to forfeit a horse farm he bought for a former girlfriend, six racing cars, a racing trailer, and $448,000 in cash that federal agents seized in 2006, and to pay at least $1.6 million in back taxes to the IRS. He did not admit to other acts of which federal authorities accused him, including extortion, attempted arson, and kidnapping.

== Danbury Trashers ==
In June 2006, 29 people, including Galante, former Trashers' coach Todd Stirling, and Ianniello were indicted for defrauding the United Hockey League. Stirling and Galante allegedly violated the UHL's $275,000 per team salary cap by giving several players and their wives no-show jobs with AWD and hiding illegitimate payments as housing allowances. Stirling also faced six counts of wire fraud related to the filing of fraudulent weekly salary cap reports. According to the indictment, the Trashers' real payroll was nearly $750,000. Amidst these allegations, the Trashers suspended operations and released their players. In June 2008, Galante pleaded guilty to these charges. In a separate incident, in December 2004, Galante was charged with assaulting a UHL official during a game between the Trashers and the Kalamazoo Wings.

== Putnam Victory Fund ==
Galante was accused of donating to a PAC (Political Action Committee) which laundered money to several politicians who may have used their influence to award contracts to Galante's trash hauling business. Former State Assemblyman Willis Stephens, who also served as the legal counsel to the town of Southeast, New York, accepted over $9,000 from Galante. On Stephens' recommendation, the town board then awarded a $1.5 million no-bid garbage contract to Galante's company. The investigation culminated with raids of Putnam County Executive Robert Bondi's office, although no charges were ever filed.

== Louis DeLuca scandal ==
In 2007, Former Connecticut State Senate Minority Leader Louis DeLuca pleaded guilty to misdemeanor charges in connection with Galante. DeLuca had asked Galante to threaten the husband of DeLuca's granddaughter, whom DeLuca believed was being abused. DeLuca also accepted large donations from Galante and his associates and allegedly promised to look out for Galante's interests. As of November 2007, a State Senate Committee was considering an appropriate sanction for DeLuca. Other Connecticut politicians, including Connecticut U.S. Senator Joe Lieberman, received campaign funds raised by Galante, but had not been linked to any actions on Galante's behalf. On November 13, 2007, DeLuca cut the investigation short by announcing his resignation from the State Senate.
