= Michelle Cook =

American politician (born 1970)

Member of the Connecticut House of Representatives from the 65th district
- In office January 7, 2009 – January 8, 2025
- Preceded by: Anne Ruwet
- Succeeded by: Joseph Canino

Personal details
- Born: January 19, 1970 (age 56) St. Louis, Missouri, U.S.
- Party: Democratic
- Children: 4
- Education: Missouri Baptist University (BS); Central Connecticut State University (MS)

Michelle Cook (born January 19, 1970) is an American politician who served the Connecticut House of Representatives from the 65th district from 2009 to 2025.

In the 2024 Connecticut House of Representatives election, she was unseated by Republican candidate Joseph Canino.
