= Connecticut's 88th House of Representatives district =

American legislative district

Connecticut's 88th State House of Representatives district
Representative
Josh Elliott; D

Connecticut's 88th House of Representatives district elects one member of the Connecticut House of Representatives. It encompasses parts of Hamden and has been represented by Democrat Josh Elliott since 2017.

== List of representatives ==
List of Representatives from Connecticut's 88th State House District
Representative	Party	Years	District home	Note
Louis Cutillo	Democratic	1967–1971	Waterbury	Seat created
Michael R. Colucci	Democratic	1971–1973	Waterbury	
Francis J. Meskill	Republican	1973–1975	Hamden	
John P. McManus	Democratic	1975–1977	Hamden	
David K. Dodes	Republican	1977–1979	Hamden	
John P. McManus	Democratic	1979–1981	Hamden	
Howard Luppi	Republican	1981–1987	North Haven	
Charles Karjanis	Democratic	1987–1989	Hamden	
Howard Luppi	Republican	1989–1991	North Haven	
Curtis Andrews Jr.	Republican	1991–1993	Hamden	
Nancy Beals	Democratic	1993–2003	Hamden	
Brendan Sharkey	Democratic	2003–2017	Hamden	
Josh Elliott	Democratic	2017–	Hamden	

== Recent elections ==
=== 2020 ===
2020 Connecticut State House of Representatives election, District 88
Party	Candidate	Votes	%
Democratic	Josh Elliott (incumbent)	6,392	63.51
Republican	Kathleen Hoyt	3,355	33.33
Working Families	Josh Elliott (incumbent)	318	3.16
Total votes		9,676	100.00
Democratic hold			

=== 2018 ===
2018 Connecticut House of Representatives election, District 88
Party	Candidate	Votes	%
Democratic	Josh Elliott (Incumbent)	6,561	70.2
Republican	Debra Rigney	2,786	29.8
Total votes		9,347	100.00
Democratic hold			

=== 2016 ===
2016 Connecticut House of Representatives election, District 88
Party	Candidate	Votes	%
Democratic	Josh Elliott	6,375	62.2
Republican	Marjorie Bonadies	3,874	37.8
Total votes		10,249	100.00
Democratic hold			

=== 2014 ===
2014 Connecticut House of Representatives election, District 88
Party	Candidate	Votes	%
Democratic	Brendan Sharkey (Incumbent)	4,641	66.6
Republican	Matthew Corcoran	2,325	33.4
Total votes		6,966	100.00
Democratic hold			

=== 2012 ===
2012 Connecticut House of Representatives election, District 88
Party	Candidate	Votes	%
Democratic	Brendan Sharkey (Incumbent)	7,163	100.0
Total votes		7,163	100.00
Democratic hold			
