= Katy Parker =

Katy or Kat(i)e Parker may refer to:

== People ==
- Katie Parker, Australian cycling pilot
- Katie Parker (skier), Australian alpine skier
- Katy Parker (table tennis)

== Fictional characters ==
- Katie Parker, character in Funny Bones
- Katie Parker, character in Guiding Light
- Katie Parker, character in Sorority Wars

== See also ==
- Kate Parker (disambiguation)
- Catherine Parker (disambiguation)
