= Brian J. Flaherty =

American politician

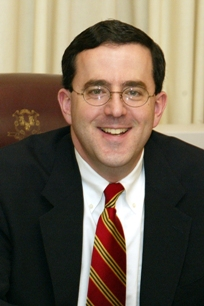

Member of the Connecticut House of Representatives from the 68th district
- In office 1989–2003
- Preceded by: Sean C. Butterly
- Succeeded by: Sean Williams

Personal details
- Born: 1965 (age 60–61) Waterbury, Connecticut, U.S.
- Party: Republican

Brian J. Flaherty is a Republican politician from Watertown, Connecticut. Flaherty served eight terms as State Representative for the 68th Assembly District from 1989 to 2003 and held the position of Deputy Minority Leader in the Connecticut House of Representatives for 10 years.

== Career ==
Flaherty was first elected to the Connecticut House of Representatives in 1988 at the age of 23. During his tenure, Brian was ranked by his colleagues as one of the top 10 most effective House members according to a Connecticut Magazine poll. Flaherty was also honored as "Legislator of the Year" by the Connecticut Library Association, the Greater Hartford Chamber of Commerce, the Connecticut Council of Small Towns, and the Connecticut Conference of Independent Colleges. He was a staunch advocate for higher education, and co-authored legislation creating Connecticut's statewide education computer network and the Connecticut Digital Library.

Upon his retiring from the Connecticut House of Representatives in 2003, Governor of Connecticut Jodi Rell appointed Flaherty to the Board of Governors for Higher Education, where he served as vice-chairman of the state's coordinating agency for Connecticut colleges and universities. Flaherty was also Director of Public Affairs for Nestlé Waters North America where he directed the company's government and legislative affairs program as well as community outreach.

Flaherty appears periodically as a Republican political analyst for Hartford-based WFSB TV's political and current events program Face the State alongside Democratic analyst Duby McDowell. WFSB is Connecticut's CBS News affiliate.

== Education ==
Flaherty graduated from Holy Cross High School and earned his bachelor's degree from Fairfield University in 1987.
