= Josh Elliott (politician) =

American politician

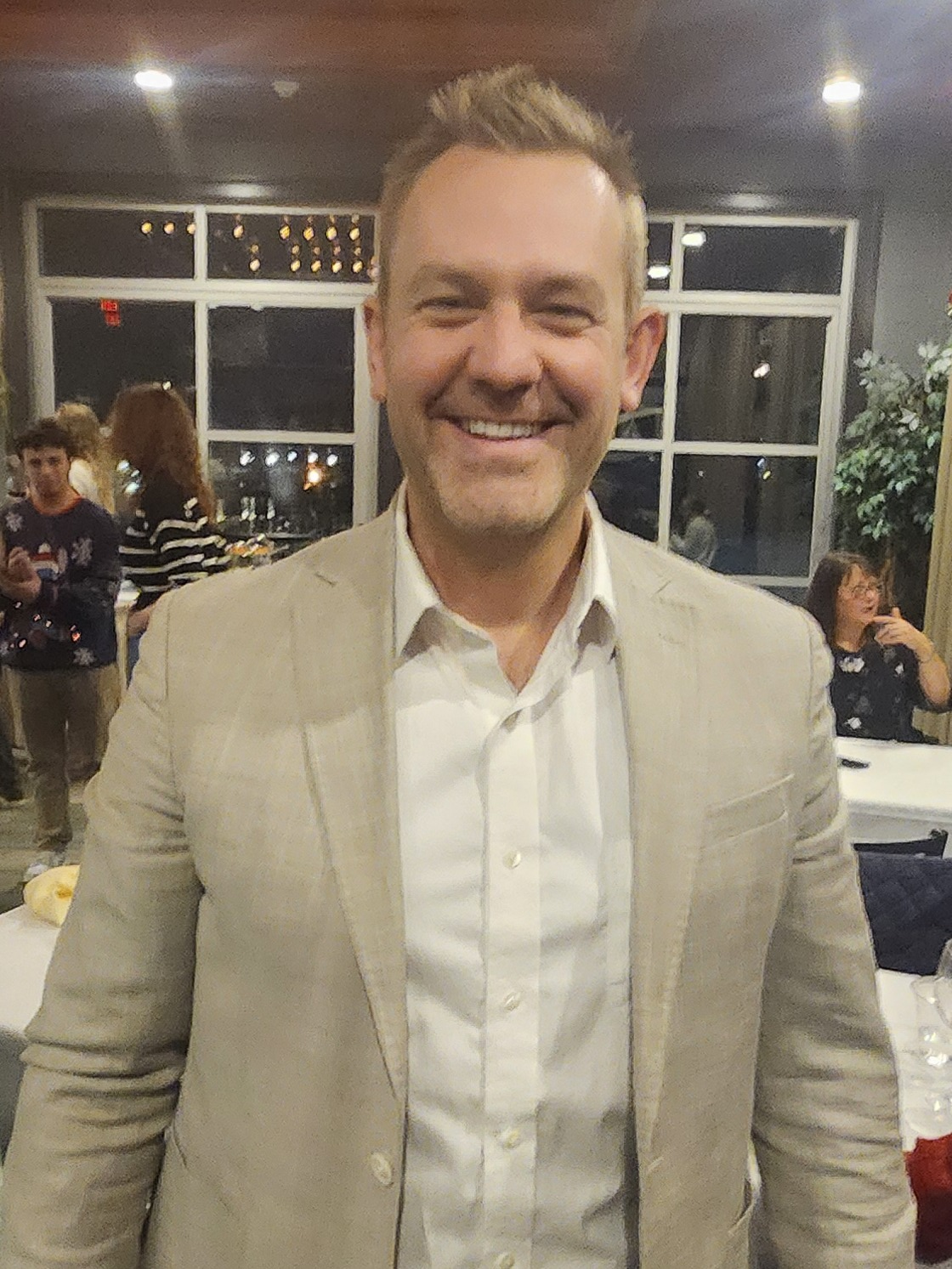
- Elliott in 2025

Member of the Connecticut House of Representatives from the 88th district
- Incumbent
- Assumed office January 3, 2017
- Preceded by: Brendan Sharkey

Personal details
- Born: 1984 (age 41–42) Guilford, Connecticut, U.S.
- Party: Democratic
- Education: Ithaca College (BA); Quinnipiac University (JD)
- Website: Campaign website

Joshua Elliott (born 1984) is an American businessman and politician serving as a member of the Connecticut House of Representatives from the 88th district. Elected in November 2016, he assumed office in 2017, succeeding Former State Rep. and Speaker of the Connecticut House of Representatives, Brendan Sharkey, following his retirement after serving 16 years in the Connecticut General Assembly.

A Democrat, Elliott ran for Governor of Connecticut in 2026, competing in a primary with incumbent Governor Ned Lamont, who sought reelection to a third term. Elliott lost the primary to Lamont in August of that year.

== Early life and education ==
Elliott was born in Guilford, Connecticut, and represents Hamden. He earned a Bachelor of Arts degree in sociology from Ithaca College and a Juris Doctor from the Quinnipiac University School of Law.

== Career ==
After graduating from law school, Elliott opened two grocery stores with his mother, Mary Ellen Stearman. Elliott was elected to the Connecticut House of Representatives in November 2016 and assumed office in 2017. During the 2019–2020 legislative session, Elliott was vice chair of the House Commerce Committee. In the 2021–2022 session, he was co-chair of the Higher Education and Employment Advancement Committee.

Elliott ran unsuccessfully for Secretary of the State of Connecticut in 2022, vying to replace the retiring Denise Merrill.

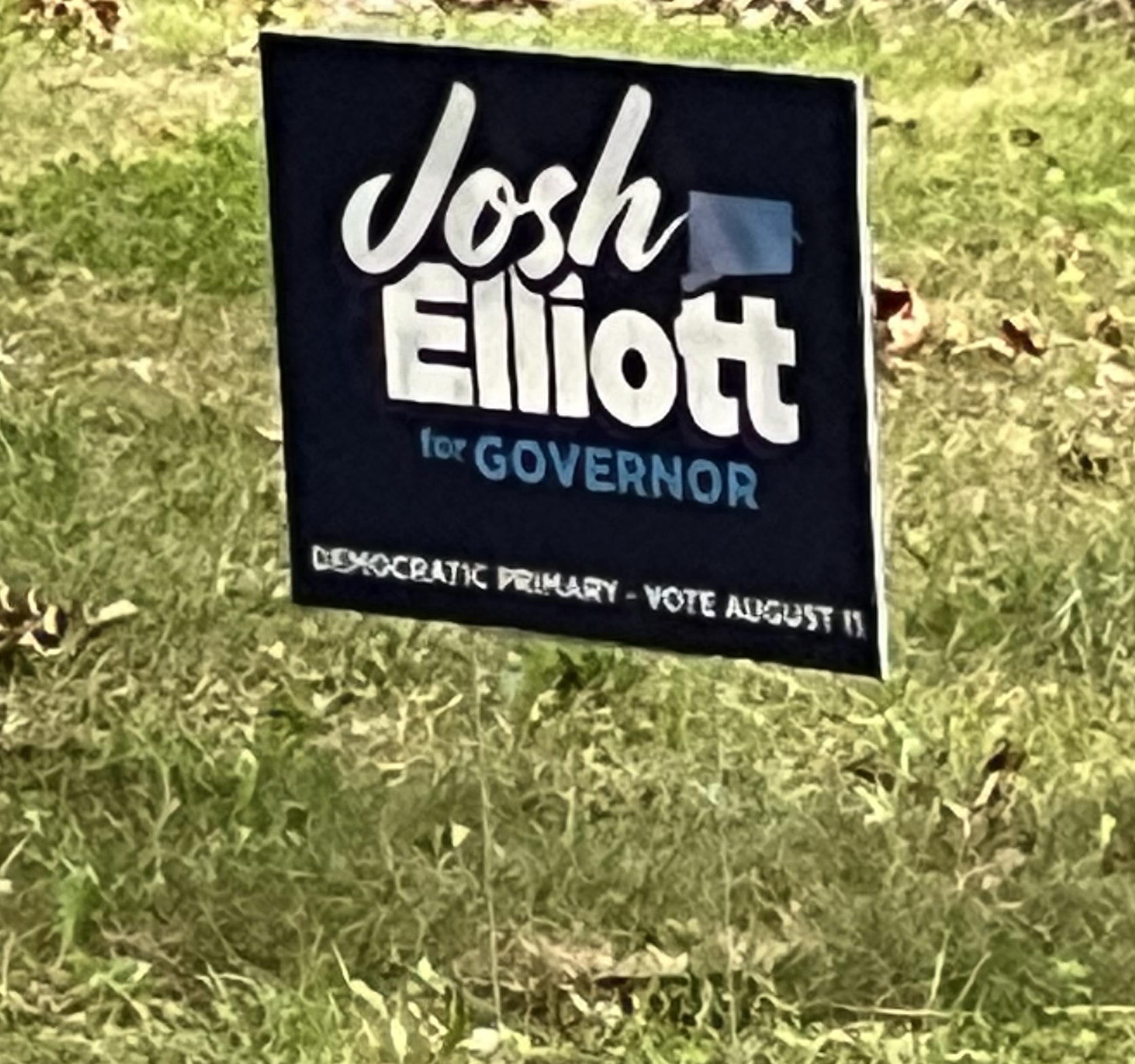
A lawn sign in support of Elliott's campaign for governor

On July 8, 2025, Elliott filed to run for Governor of Connecticut in 2026, after having "predicted that Gov. Ned Lamont would not go unchallenged for the Democratic nomination if he runs." He formally announced his candidacy on July 14.

In May 2026, Elliott won 25% of the vote for governor at the Connecticut Democratic Convention, forcing a primary despite Lamont receiving the party's endorsement. The vote was described as a "major upset." Elliott lost the primary to Lamont in August later that year.

== Electoral history ==
2026 Connecticut gubernatorial Democratic primary election
Party	Candidate	Votes	%
Democratic	Ned Lamont (Incumbent)	TBD	TBD
Democratic	Josh Elliott	TBD	TBD
	Total Votes	TBD	TBD
Results: TBD	Winner: TBD	TBD	TBD

2026 Connecticut House of Representatives, District 88 election
Party	Candidate	Votes	%
Democratic	Josh Elliott (Incumbent)	TBD	TBD
Republican	Hudson Molinari	TBD	TBD
	Total Votes	TBD	TBD
Results: TBD	Winner: TBD	TBD	TBD

2024 Connecticut House of Representatives, District 88 general election
Party	Candidate	Votes	%
Democratic	Josh Elliott (Incumbent)	6,998	90.0
Working Families	Josh Elliott (Incumbent)	778	10.0
	Total Votes	7,776	100.0
Democratic Hold	Winner: Josh Elliott (Incumbent)	7,776	100.0

2024 Connecticut House of Representatives, District 88 Democratic primary
Party	Candidate	Votes	%
Democratic	Josh Elliott (Incumbent)	1,425	82.2
Democratic	Dan Garrett	309	17.8
	Total Votes	1,734	100.0
Democratic Nominee	Winner: Josh Elliott (Incumbent)	1,425	82.2

=== 2022 ===
2022 Connecticut House of Representatives, District 88 election
Party	Candidate	Votes	%
Democratic	Josh Elliott (Incumbent)	5,003	63.13
Republican	Micheal Pace	2,685	33.9
Working Families	Josh Elliott (Incumbent)	237	2.99
	Total Votes	7,925	100.0
Democratic Hold	Winner: Josh Elliott (Incumbent)	5,240	66.1

=== 2020 ===
2020 Connecticut House of Representatives, District 88 election
Party	Candidate	Votes	%
Democratic	Josh Elliott (Incumbent)	6,392	66.06
Republican	Kathy Hoyt	2,966	30.7
Working Families	Josh Elliott (Incumbent)	318	3.29
	Total Votes	9,676	100.0
Democratic Hold	Winner: Josh Elliott (Incumbent)	6,710	69.3

=== 2018 ===
2018 Connecticut House of Representatives, District 88 election
Party	Candidate	Votes	%
Democratic	Josh Elliott (Incumbent)	6,561	70.2
Republican	Debra Rigney	2,786	29.8
	Total Votes	9,347	100.0
Democratic Hold	Winner: Josh Elliott (Incumbent)	6,561	70.2

2016 Connecticut House of Representatives, District 88 general election
Party	Candidate	Votes	%
Democratic	Joshua Elliott	6,375	62.20
Republican	Marjorie Bonadies	3,874	37.80
	Total Votes	10,249	100.0
Democratic Hold	Winner: Joshua Elliott	6,375	62.20

2016 Connecticut House of Representatives, District 88 Democratic primary
Party	Candidate	Votes	%
Democratic	Joshua Elliott	1,053	56.46
Democratic	James Pascarella	812	43.54
	Total Votes	1,865	100.0
Democratic Nominee	Winner: Joshua Elliott	1,053	56.46
