= Ann Dandrow =

American educator and politician (1936–2017)

Member of the Connecticut House of Representatives from the 30th district
- In office 1986–2002

Personal details
- Born: Ann Platt; August 20, 1936 Boston, Massachusetts, U.S.
- Died: January 25, 2017 (aged 80)
- Party: Republican
- Education: New Hampshire College
- Profession: Politician, educator

Ann S. Platt Dandrow (August 20, 1936 – January 25, 2017) was an American educator and state legislator in Connecticut.

== Early life and education ==
Ann Platt was born in Boston, Massachusetts, the eldest daughter of Morris Thomas Platt and Mary Elizabeth Cleary Platt. Her father was an engineer; her mother was born in Ireland. She graduated from St. Mary's High School, in 1954, in New Haven, Connecticut. She attended Quinnipiac College and the University of Bridgeport as a young woman.

== Career ==
Dandrow's fourth child was born deaf, after Dandrow caught rubella during the pregnancy. Because of this personal experience, Dandrow was founder and president of the Connecticut Association for Hearing Impaired Children, and lobbied for special education legislation in Connecticut. She received the Community Leader of America award in 1969. She and her daughter were at the White House in 1990 for the signing of the Americans with Disabilities Act.

Dandrow's work as a lobbyist led her into a career in politics. She served on the Southington Town Board and on the Southington Board of Education. Dandrow was a member of the Connecticut House of Representatives from 1986 to 2002. She was credited with leading the successful effort to pass a statewide Safe Haven law in 2000. She ran unsuccessfully for a Connecticut State Senate seat in 2002. Dandrow started in politics as a Democrat, but for most of her career was a Republican.

Dandrow was adjunct professor at the University of Connecticut and served as assistant director of the Berlin Senior Center. she was also assistant editor of the weekly newspaper The Plainville News.

== Personal life and legacy ==
Platt married Gerald Dandrow in 1957. They had four children, Jerry, Susan, Paul and Judy. Dandrow died from a stroke in 2017, at the age of 80, in Southington, Connecticut.
