= Anne Ruwet =

American politician

Member of the Connecticut House of Representatives from the 65th district
- In office January 8, 2003 – January 7, 2009
- Preceded by: John S. Kovaleski
- Succeeded by: Michelle Cook

Personal details
- Born: September 22, 1950 (age 75) Torrington, Connecticut, U.S.
- Party: Republican

Anne Ruwet (born September 22, 1950) is an American politician who served in the Connecticut House of Representatives from the 65th district from 2003 to 2009.
