= Kate Parker =

Kate Parker may refer to:

- Kate Parker, field hockey player
- Kate Parker, New Zealand artist and author

== See also ==
- Katie Parker (disambiguation)
- Catherine Parker (disambiguation)
