= Addo Bonetti =

American politician (1926–2021)

Member of the Connecticut House of Representatives from the 65th district
- In office 1973–1979
- Preceded by: Mary A. Martin
- Succeeded by: John J. Miscikoski

Member of the Connecticut House of Representatives from the 175th district
- In office 1967–1973

Personal details
- Born: April 4, 1926 Torrington, Connecticut, U.S.
- Died: June 6, 2021 (aged 95)
- Party: Democratic
- Spouse: Lois E. Sjogren

Military service
- Branch/service: United States Marine Corps
- Battles/wars: World War II
- Awards: Purple Heart

Addo E. Bonetti (April 4, 1926 – June 6, 2021) was an American politician and Marine who served in the Connecticut House of Representatives from the 175th and 65th districts from 1967 to 1979, as a member of the Democratic Party. Prior to his political career he had served in the United States Marine Corps during World War II.

Bonetti was born in Torrington, Connecticut, and educated at Torrington High School. After graduating from high school he served in the United States Marine Corps where he would be given the Purple Heart after being wounded at the Battle of Iwo Jima. Following his service in the Marines he entered local politics in Torrington with campaigns for a seat on the Democratic Town Committee, Board of Tax Review, and town clerk.

Bonetti was elected to the state house from the 175th district and did not face significant opposition until the 1972 election. In 1972, he and Representative John J. Miscikoski were both moved into the 65th district and Bonetti was initially defeated until the primary was invalidated and a new one was held in which Bonetti won. He served in the state house until 1979. Bonetti died in 2021.

== Early life and education ==
Addo E. Bonetti was born in Torrington, Connecticut, on April 4, 1926, to Teresa Berti and Domenico Bonetti. He graduated from Torrington High School. On June 29, 1944, he enlisted into the United States Marine Corps and served during World War II before becoming a corporal. During the war he was wounded after a grenade hit his helmet at the Battle of Iwo Jima on March 12, 1945, and was given the Purple Heart. He married Lois E. Sjogren and stayed with her until her death in 1974.

== Career ==
=== Local politics ===
Bonetti ran for a seat on the Democratic Town Committee in Torrington as part of a rival slate to the slate endorsed by the Democratic Party in 1960, but lost and the slate of twenty-four candidates Bonetti was in failed to win a single seat. Bonetti was the member of the slate who received the highest number of votes. Bonetti was appointed to the Board of Tax Review to fill the vacancy created by the resignation of Guido De Angelis who was appointed to a job at the Litchfield State Jail, but Bonetti lost re-election in 1961. Bonetti was elected with the Democratic nomination as one of thirty-two justices of the peace in 1962. In 1965, he ran for town clerk with the endorsement of the Torrington Democratic Town Committee, but lost to Fred Bruni.

Bonetti was a member of the Young Democrats of America and served as the treasurer of the Torrington Young Democrats. He was selected to serve as a delegate to the Democratic Party of Connecticut's state convention in 1962 and 1968.

=== Connecticut House of Representatives ===
==== Elections ====
During the 1966 election Bonetti ran for a seat in the Connecticut House of Representatives from the 175th district with the Democratic nomination and defeated Republican nominee John Cilfone. Bonetti reported no contributions or expenses during the campaign, but the Citizens for Bonetti movement spent $431 on his behalf while Cilfone raised $92 and spent $92. He won reelection after defeating Republican nominee Joseph Perosino, a member of the city council, in the 1968 election. He defeated Republican nominee Cilfone in the 1970 election.

Bonetti and Representative John J. Miscikoski were both moved into the 65th district after legislative redistricting in 1972. The Torrington Democratic Town Committee voted fifty-nine to two to not endorse a candidate in the Democratic primary. Bonetti was initially defeated in the primary by Miscikoski by one vote and a recount maintained Miscikoski's one vote victory. However, Judge George Saden invalidated the primary and ordered a new one due to a Republican having mistakenly voted in the primary. Bonetti defeated Miscikoski in the second primary and won in the general election against Republican nominee Edwin R. Chadwick. He defeated Republican nominee William T. Barrante in the 1974 election. He won reelection in the 1976 election against Republican nominee George H. Christian.

Bonetti did not seek reelection in the 1978 election and the Torrington Democratic Town Committee endorsed Miscikoski. Miscikoski was elected to succeed him in the state house.

==== Tenure ====
Bonetti supported Ella Grasso for the Democratic nomination during the 1974 gubernatorial election. In 1975, Speaker James Kennelly appointed Bonetti to serve on the Finance Advisory Committee until March 17, 1976. During his tenure he served as vice-chair of the Appropriations committee.

== Later life ==
Bonetti considered running for mayor of Torrington in 1979. Bonetti was selected by the Services for the Elderly Commission to work as director of elderly services following the death of Edward Sullivan. Although the commission recommended the appointment of Bonetti as director, Mayor Michael J. Conway appointed Margaret Murphy as director instead. George P. Avitabile, the chair of the commission, resigned in protest at the decision. Bonetti then worked as an aide for House Majority Leader John Groppo.

Robert M. Phalen, the city clerk of Torrington, announced that he would not seek reelection to a seventh term in 1981, after being fined $5,000 and given a suspended sentence of one year after not filing his federal income tax returns in 1977. Bonetti defeated Frank Czapor, who was endorsed by the Democratic Town Committee, in the primary. He defeated Republican nominee Richard Zaharek in the general election. He won reelection in the 1985 election against Republican nominee Roger F. Pollick and was the candidate who received the most votes in Torrington's city elections. He won reelection without opposition in 1989. Bonetti did not seek reelection and was replaced by Frank R. Vitalo in 1992.

During the 1986 gubernatorial election, Bonetti supported Governor William A. O'Neill. During the 1995 Torrington mayoral election, he supported Mary Jane Gryniuk and worked as a leader in her campaign.

Bonetti died on June 6, 2021, at the age of 95.

== Political positions ==
=== Freedom of speech ===
Bonetti introduced legislation in 1969 which required the expulsion of college students or employees if they took part in a riot or a violent demonstration. Representative Audrey P. Beck was the only legislator to oppose the legislation in committee. The legislation got through the Education committee after Bonetti presented a petition showing that the legislation had the support of 115 members of the state house.

=== Women's rights ===
The state house voted 148 to 10, with Bonetti against, in favor of an amendment to the Constitution of Connecticut which would prohibit discrimination based on sex in addition to the current listing of religion, race, color, ancestry or national origin. The state house voted eighty-three to seventy-seven, with Bonetti against, on ratifying the Equal Rights Amendment which was not enough votes to ratify the amendment. In 1972, the state house voted 120 to 49, with Bonetti in favor, in favor of anti-abortion legislation. The state house voted ninety-nine to forty-seven, with Bonetti against, to ratify the Equal Rights Amendment in 1973.

=== Workers ===
Bonetti supported the Committee to Stop the Strike which was an organization that opposed strikes being done at colleges. Bonetti voted in favor of reducing the work week of state employees to thirty-five hours in 1967, but later stated that he regretted voting for it and introduced legislation to restore the forty-hour work week for state employees in 1971. He introduced legislation which would freeze the hiring of state employees for two-and-a-half years after Governor Thomas Meskill temporarily halted the hiring of state employees.

== Electoral history ==
1961 Torrington, Connecticut Board of Tax Review election
Party	Candidate	Votes	%
Republican	Thomas G. Zappula	7,598	27.35%
Republican	Alfred Avagliano	7,548	27.17%
Democratic	Addo Bonetti	6,362	22.90%
Democratic	Anthony DeBerardino	6,269	22.57%
Total votes		27,777	100.00%

1965 Torrington, Connecticut town clerk election
Party	Candidate	Votes	%
Democratic	Thomas G. Zappula	7,088	55.92%
Democratic	Addo Bonetti	5,588	44.08%
Total votes		12,676	100.00%

1966 Connecticut House of Representatives 175th district election
Party	Candidate	Votes	%
Democratic	Addo Bonetti	3,777	58.80%
Republican	John Cilfone	2,647	41.20%
Total votes		6,424	100.00%

1968 Connecticut House of Representatives 175th district election
Party	Candidate	Votes	%	±%
Democratic	Addo Bonetti (incumbent)	4,438	64.37%	+5.57%
Republican	Joseph Perosino	2,457	35.63%	−5.57%
Total votes		6,895	100.00%	

1970 Connecticut House of Representatives 175th district election
Party	Candidate	Votes	%	±%
Democratic	Addo Bonetti (incumbent)	4,011	61.77%	−2.60%
Republican	John Cilfone	2,482	38.23%	+2.60%
Total votes		6,493	100.00%	

1972 Connecticut House of Representatives 65th district Democratic primary (invalidated)
Party	Candidate	Votes	%
Democratic	John J. Miscikowski (incumbent)	1,040	50.02%
Democratic	Addo Bonetti (incumbent)	1,039	49.98%
Total votes		2,079	100.00%

1972 Connecticut House of Representatives 65th district Democratic primary
Party	Candidate	Votes	%
Democratic	Addo Bonetti (incumbent)	1,598	52.09%
Democratic	John J. Miscikowski (incumbent)	1,470	47.91%
Total votes		3,068	100.00%

1972 Connecticut House of Representatives 65th district election
Party	Candidate	Votes	%	±%
Democratic	Addo Bonetti (incumbent)	6,101	62.54%	+0.77%
Republican	Edwin R. Chadwick	3,655	37.46%	−0.77%
Total votes		9,756	100.00%	

1974 Connecticut House of Representatives 65th district election
Party	Candidate	Votes	%	±%
Democratic	Addo Bonetti (incumbent)	5,291	70.51%	+7.97%
Republican	William T. Barrante	2,213	29.49%	−7.97%
Total votes		7,504	100.00%	

1976 Connecticut House of Representatives 65th district election
Party	Candidate	Votes	%	±%
Democratic	Addo Bonetti (incumbent)	5,799	63.52%	−6.99%
Republican	George H. Christian	3,330	36.48%	+6.99%
Total votes		9,129	100.00%	

1981 Torrington, Connecticut city clerk election
Primary election
Party	Candidate	Votes	%
Democratic	Addo Bonetti	1,996	54.93%
Democratic	Frank Czapor	1,638	45.07%
Total votes		3,634	100.00%
General election
Democratic	Addo Bonetti	6,622	60.48%
Republican	Richard Zaharek	4,327	39.52%
Total votes		10,949	100.00%

1985 Torrington, Connecticut city clerk election
Party	Candidate	Votes	%	±%
Democratic	Addo Bonetti (incumbent)	6,777	63.60%	+3.12%
Republican	Roger F. Pollick	3,879	36.40%	−3.12%
Total votes		10,949	100.00%	

1989 Torrington, Connecticut city clerk election
Party	Candidate	Votes	%	±%
Democratic	Addo Bonetti (incumbent)	7,910	100.00%	+36.40%
Total votes		7,910	100.00%	

== See also ==
- List of close election results
