= Mary A. Martin =

American politician (1923–2014)

Member of the Connecticut Senate from the 18th district
- In office 1975–1985
- Preceded by: Samuel B. Hellier
- Succeeded by: Donald Schoolcraft

Member of the Connecticut House of Representatives from the 65th district
- In office 1971–1973
- Preceded by: Sidney Axelrod
- Succeeded by: Addo Bonetti

Personal details
- Born: Mary A. Kukon; July 18, 1923 Baltimore, Maryland, U.S.
- Died: September 18, 2014 (aged 91) Groton, Connecticut, U.S.
- Party: Democratic
- Spouse: Howard W. Martin Sr.
- Children: 3

Mary A. Martin (July 18, 1923 – September 18, 2014) was an American Democratic politician from Connecticut. From 1971 to 1973, she represented the 65th district in the Connecticut House of Representatives, and from 1975 to 1985, she represented the 18th district in the Connecticut State Senate.

== Personal life ==
Martin was born Mary A. Kukon on July 18, 1923, in Baltimore, Maryland. On August 23, 1948, she married Howard W. Martin Sr. in New London, Connecticut. They had three children together and lived in Groton, Connecticut.

Martin died on September 18, 2014, in Groton. She was 91.

== Political career ==
Martin began her political career in Groton, where she served as a member of the Groton Town Council and Groton Democratic Town Committee.

Martin was elected to the Connecticut House of Representatives in 1970, and she served one term representing the 65th district as a Democrat. She was succeeded by Addo Bonetti. In 1972, Martin ran for election to the 41st district, but was defeated by Republican candidate Phyllis Kipp.

Martin was elected to the Connecticut State Senate in 1974, and she served five terms representing the 18th district. Martin did not run for reelection in 1984, and she retired in 1985.
