= Chris Winnes =

American ice hockey player (born 1968)

- Born: February 12, 1968 (age 57) Ridgefield, Connecticut, USA
- Height: 5 ft 11 in (180 cm)
- Weight: 230 lb (104 kg; 16 st 6 lb)
- Position: Right wing
- Shot: Right
- Played for: Boston Bruins; Philadelphia Flyers
- National team: United States
- NHL draft: 161st overall, 1987; Boston Bruins
- Playing career: 1991–2002

Christopher Robert Winnes (born February 12, 1968) is an American retired professional ice hockey right winger who played parts of four seasons in the National Hockey League (NHL) with the Boston Bruins and Philadelphia Flyers between 1991 and 1993. The rest of his career, which lasted from 1991 to 2002, was spent in the minor leagues. Internationally Winnes played for the American national team at the 1992 World Championships. Winnes later became a firefighter with the Warwick Fire Department in Rhode Island.

== Playing career ==
Recruited by a number of teams out of Northwood Prep School in Lake Placid, New York, Winnes was selected by the Boston Bruins in the 1987 Entry Draft (9th choice, 161st overall).

Winnes played four years (1987–1991) at the University of New Hampshire. During the 1987–88 season, he became the first freshman ever to lead his team in scoring, resulting in his nomination to the Hockey East All-Freshman Team.

At the conclusion of his senior year with the Wildcats in 1990–91, Winnes joined the Maine Mariners of the American Hockey League before making his NHL debut with the Bruins during the 1991 playoffs. He spent most of the 1991–92 season with the Mariners but would go on to play 24 games with the Bruins that season and later competed at the 1992 World Championships as a member of the U.S. National team.

After playing in only five NHL games in 1992–93, and spending most of the season with the Providence Bruins, Winnes signed as a free agent with the Philadelphia Flyers in 1993. The following season saw Winnes play in four games with the Flyers, playing most of the season and the following in the minors as a member of the Hershey Bears.

Winnes retired from hockey following the 2001–02 season, ending a career which saw him play 34 NHL games, tallying one goal and six assists for seven points. Winnes' lone NHL goal occurred as a member of the Boston Bruins on November 22, 1991, in Boston's 6–3 loss to the Washington Capitals.

== Career statistics ==
=== Regular season and playoffs ===
			Regular season					Playoffs
Season	Team	League	GP	G	A	Pts	PIM	GP	G	A	Pts	PIM
1985–86	Ridgefield High School	HS-CT	24	40	30	70	—	—	—	—	—	—
1986–87	Northwood School	HS-NY	47	25	33	58	56	—	—	—	—	—
1987–88	University of New Hampshire	HE	30	17	19	36	28	—	—	—	—	—
1988–89	University of New Hampshire	HE	30	11	20	31	22	—	—	—	—	—
1989–90	University of New Hampshire	HE	24	10	13	23	12	—	—	—	—	—
1990–91	University of New Hampshire	HE	33	15	16	31	24	—	—	—	—	—
1990–91	Maine Mariners	AHL	7	3	1	4	0	1	0	2	2	0
1990–91	Boston Bruins	NHL	—	—	—	—	—	1	0	0	0	0
1991–92	Maine Mariners	AHL	45	12	35	47	30	—	—	—	—	—
1991–92	Boston Bruins	NHL	24	1	3	4	6	—	—	—	—	—
1992–93	Providence Bruins	AHL	64	23	36	59	34	4	0	2	2	5
1992–93	Boston Bruins	NHL	5	0	1	1	0	—	—	—	—	—
1993–94	Hershey Bears	AHL	70	29	21	50	20	7	1	3	4	0
1993–94	Philadelphia Flyers	NHL	4	0	2	2	0	—	—	—	—	—
1994–95	Hershey Bears	AHL	78	26	40	66	39	6	2	2	4	17
1995–96	Michigan K-Wings	IHL	27	6	13	19	14	—	—	—	—	—
1995–96	Fort Wayne Komets	IHL	39	6	7	13	12	2	0	0	0	0
1996–97	Utah Grizzlies	IHL	5	0	0	0	0	—	—	—	—	—
1997–98	San Antonio Dragons	IHL	3	0	0	0	0	—	—	—	—	—
1997–98	Hartford Wolf Pack	AHL	64	17	23	40	16	13	1	4	5	2
1998–99	Hartford Wolf Pack	AHL	33	7	6	13	25	1	0	0	0	0
1998–99	Manitoba Moose	IHL	11	2	0	2	0	—	—	—	—	—
1999–00	B.C. Icemen	UHL	14	7	7	14	0	3	0	4	4	0
1999–00	Louisville Panthers	AHL	12	1	3	4	6	—	—	—	—	—
1999–00	Providence Bruins	AHL	2	1	1	2	0	—	—	—	—	—
1999–00	Springfield Falcons	AHL	38	6	17	23	4	5	2	2	4	0
2000–01	New Haven Knights	UHL	6	2	6	8	4	5	1	2	3	2
2000–01	Springfield Falcons	AHL	62	13	14	27	6	—	—	—	—	—
2001–02	New Haven Knights	UHL	61	16	33	49	20	—	—	—	—	—
2001–02	Providence Bruins	AHL	3	0	0	0	0	—	—	—	—	—
AHL totals			478	138	197	335	180	37	6	15	21	24
NHL totals			33	1	6	7	6	1	0	0	0	0

=== International ===
Year	Team	Event	GP	G	A	Pts	PIM
1992	United States	WC	6	3	2	5	4
Senior totals			6	3	2	5	4

== Awards and honors ==
Award	Year
All-Hockey East Rookie Team	1987–88
