= Joe Aresimowicz =

American politician

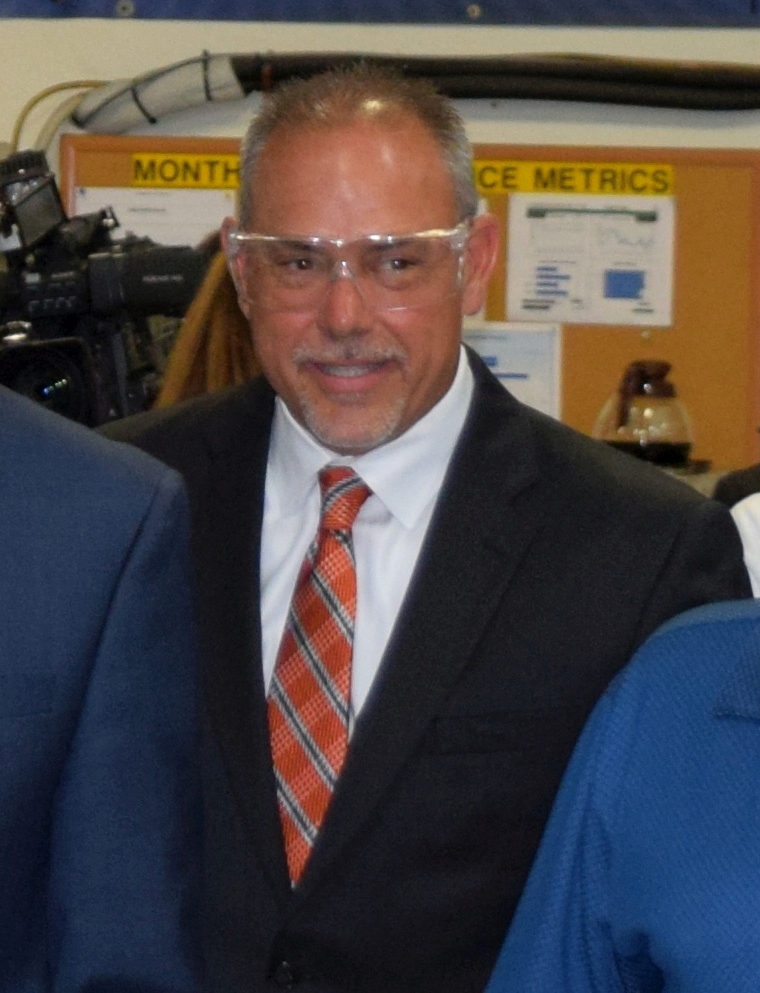

Speaker of the Connecticut House of Representatives
- In office January 3, 2017 – January 6, 2021
- Preceded by: Brendan Sharkey
- Succeeded by: Matthew Ritter

Member of the Connecticut House of Representatives from the 30th district
- In office January 2005 – January 6, 2021
- Preceded by: Bob Peters
- Succeeded by: Donna Veach

Personal details
- Born: November 5, 1970 (age 55) Berlin, Connecticut, U.S.
- Party: Democratic
- Spouse: Crystal
- Children: 3
- Education: National Labor College

Joe Aresimowicz (born November 5, 1970) is a former American Democratic politician serving as a member of the Connecticut House of Representatives and former Speaker of the House. From 2013 to 2017, he served as Majority Leader.

== Early life, education, and family ==
Aresimowicz grew up in Berlin, Connecticut and he attended public schools in Berlin through high school. He is a graduate of the defunct National Labor College in Silver Springs, Maryland. Aresimowicz served in the United States Army Reserve as a combat medic, and was honorably discharged after over a decade of service. He is a member of St. Paul's Roman Catholic Church in Kensington.

== Union work ==
Aresimowicz is a former union president and an ally of organized labor. In addition to his part-time job at the Connecticut General Assembly, Aresimowicz is employed by AFSCME Council 4a, which represents state and municipal workers, where he serves as the education coordinator, teaching classes on organizing and bargaining. He mostly works with the municipal unions to avoid conflicts of interest with his state leadership duties. He does not negotiate contracts, but he does represent some employees in grievances against the state. The CT Mirror reported that his pay as a Union coordinator totalled $71,128 in 2012, $79,947 in 2013, $88,742 in 2014 and $97,112 in 2015.

Upon his accession to House Speaker, the Republican State Central Committee argued that Aresimowicz had "an untenable conflict in his ability to properly lead the House of Representatives and confront the insurmountable and rising costs of employee labor agreements, pension contributions and health care costs", because of his close connections to Connecticut's public sector union. Upon the request of Aresimowicz, the Office of State Ethics conducted an analysis and recommended that Aresimowicz be able to assume the position. The republican majority leader Themis Klarides agreed, stating that "each speaker has had different issues based on what you do for a living" and "as long as you have a part-time legislature, you're going to have those issues."

== Political career ==
Before joining the state legislature, Aresimowicz served three terms on the Berlin Town Council. Aresimowicz was elected to the Connecticut House of Representatives in 2004 to represent the 30th Assembly District of Berlin and Southington. In 2013, he was elected the Majority Leader, and in 2017, he became the Speaker of the House.

In 2018, Aresimowicz was involved in a scandal over nepotism in the UConn Huskies football program. The Hartford Courant reported that Public Act 18-175, a bill about State management of online data, included a one paragraph amendment to the end of the 11-page bill that read, "A state employee who is employed at a constituent unit of the state system of higher education and a member of the immediate family of such state employee may be employed in the same department or division of such constituent unit." It was alleged that this legislation had been introduced on behalf of University of Connecticut Football Coach Randy Edsall so that he could employ his own son, Corey Edsall. Aresimowicz introduced this legislation that created a loophole for Edsall's son after Edsall spoke to him about the matter. Aresimowicz commented that "As a head coach for over 20 years I've talked to other coaches who say Corey is a first class coach and knows what he is doing," he told the Hartford Courant. "I believe that UConn has the checks and balances in place to ensure that no one is taking advantage of this situation." The State Ethics Board called this loophole amendment "An affront to all Connecticut citizens."

In January 2021, following his retirement from the Connecticut General Assembly, Aresimowicz took a job working for Gaffney, Bennett and Associates.

== Honors and awards ==
Aresimowicz has been honored by a variety of groups, including the Connecticut Early Childhood Alliance, the New England Secondary School Consortium, the American Legion, the Connecticut State Firefighters Association, the Connecticut Police Chiefs Association, the Alliance of Connecticut YMCAs, the Connecticut State Medical Society, and the Connecticut River Salmon Association.

== Electoral history ==
Connecticut House of Representatives: General Election 2016: 30th District
Party	Candidate	Votes	%
Democratic	Joe Aresimowicz	6,886	51.87
Republican	Christopher Morelli	6,389	48.13
Total votes		13,275	100

Connecticut House of Representatives: General Election 2014: 30th District
Party	Candidate	Votes	%
Democratic	Joe Aresimowicz	5,513	84.1
Working Families	Joe Aresimowicz	1,043	15.9
Total	Joe Aresimowicz (Incumbent)	6,556	100
Total votes		6,556	100

Connecticut House of Representatives: General Election 2012: 30th District
Party	Candidate	Votes	%
Democratic	Joe Aresimowicz	7,400	86.2
Working Families	Joe Aresimowicz	1,189	13.8
Total	Joe Aresimowicz (Incumbent)	8,589	100
Total votes		8,589	100

Connecticut House of Representatives: General Election 2010: 30th District
Party	Candidate	Votes	%
Democratic	Joe Aresimowicz	5,319	55.5
Working Families	Joe Aresimowicz	345	3.6
Total	Joe Aresimowicz (Incumbent)	5,664	59.1
Republican	Jim Sargent	3,917	40.9
Total votes		9,581	100

Political offices
Preceded by Brendan Sharkey	Speaker of the Connecticut House of Representatives; 2017–2021	Succeeded by Matthew Ritter
