= Donald Schoolcraft =

American politician

Member of the Connecticut State Senate from the 18th district
- In office January 9, 1985 – January 7, 1987
- Preceded by: Mary A. Martin
- Succeeded by: Steven Spellman

Personal details
- Born: July 28, 1928 Porter, West Virginia
- Died: October 1, 2020 (aged 92) Groton, Connecticut
- Party: Republican

Donald Schoolcraft (July 28, 1928 – October 1, 2020) was an American politician who served in the Connecticut State Senate from the 18th district from 1985 to 1987.

He died of COVID-19 on October 1 2020, in Groton, Connecticut at age 92.
