= Gabriel Biafore =

American politician

Member of the Connecticut House of Representatives from the 125th district
- In office January 5, 1983 – January 6, 1993
- Preceded by: Catherine Parker
- Succeeded by: Robert T. Keeley Jr.

Personal details
- Born: November 28, 1939 Westport, Connecticut, U.S.
- Died: August 13, 2019 (aged 79) Las Vegas, Nevada, U.S.
- Party: Democratic

Gabriel Biafore (November 28, 1939 – August 13, 2019) was an American politician who served in the Connecticut House of Representatives from the 125th district from 1983 to 1993.

He died on August 13, 2019, in Las Vegas, Nevada at age 79.
