= Brian Mattiello =

American politician

Member of the Connecticut House of Representatives from the 65th district
- In office January 6, 1993 – January 3, 2001
- Preceded by: George Avitable
- Succeeded by: John Kovaleski

Personal details
- Born: October 15, 1965 (age 60) Torrington, Connecticut, U.S.
- Party: Republican

Brian Mattiello (born October 15, 1965) is an American politician who served in the Connecticut House of Representatives from the 65th district from 1993 to 2001.
