= John Hetherington (Connecticut politician) =

American politician (1938–2023)

John W. Hetherington

Member of the Connecticut House of Representatives from the 125th district
- In office 2003–2013
- Preceded by: Robert T. "Bob" Keeley Jr.
- Succeeded by: Tom O'Dea

Personal details
- Born: August 15, 1938 Queens, New York, U.S.
- Died: June 14, 2023 (aged 84)
- Party: Republican

John Warner Hetherington (August 15, 1938 – June 14, 2023) was an American politician. A member of the Republican Party, he was a member of the Connecticut House of Representatives from 2003 to 2013, representing the 125th district which comprised portions of Wilton and New Canaan. Hetherington chose not to seek reelection and was succeeded by fellow Republican Tom O'Dea.

== Early life ==
He was born in Queens, New York and graduated Yale Law School before moving to New Canaan in 1983.
