= Brendan Sharkey =

American politician

Speaker of the Connecticut House of Representatives
- In office January 9, 2013 – January 9, 2017
- Preceded by: Chris Donovan
- Succeeded by: Joe Aresimowicz

Majority Leader of the Connecticut House of Representatives
- In office January 5, 2011 – January 9, 2013
- Preceded by: Denise Merrill
- Succeeded by: Joe Aresimowicz

Member of the Connecticut House of Representatives from the 88th district
- In office January 3, 2001 – January 9, 2017
- Preceded by: Margaret "Peggy" Gill
- Succeeded by: Josh Elliott

Personal details
- Born: Joseph Brendan Sharkey; March 18, 1962 (age 64) Orange, New Jersey, U.S.
- Party: Democratic
- Education: Georgetown University (B.A.); University of Connecticut, Hartford (J.D.)
- Website: House website

Joseph Brendan Sharkey (born March 18, 1962) is an American lawyer and politician. He is the former Speaker of the Connecticut House of Representatives. He was sworn in as Speaker on January 9, 2013. From 2011 until his election as Speaker he served as the Majority Leader. From 2001 to 2017, he represented the 88th Assembly District, consisting of parts of Hamden.

== Early life and family ==
Sharkey was born in Orange, New Jersey, in 1962 and moved to Connecticut in 1971. He attended Georgetown University in Washington, D.C., graduating in 1984 with a Bachelor of Arts in English and philosophy. He graduated from the University of Connecticut School of Law in 1989.

== Professional career ==
Sharkey is an attorney and owner of AmeriZone, LLC, a small consulting business specializing in zoning and permit expediting for national companies.

== Political career ==
Sharkey was first elected to the House in 2000, representing the 103rd Assembly District covering a part of Hamden. He was redistricted into the 88th District in 2002. In 2011, he was elected the Majority Leader and elected Speaker in 2013.

He previously served as House Chair of the Planning & Development Committee and the Review & Investigations Committee and served on the Finance, Revenue & Bonding Committee.

== Associations ==
- Member, Hamden Chamber of Commerce
- Member, Connecticut Bar Association

== Electoral history ==
Connecticut House of Representatives: General Election 2014: 88th District
Party	Candidate	Votes	%
Democratic	Brendan Sharkey	4,641	66.6
Republican	Matthew Corcoran	2,325	33.4
Total votes		6,966	100

Connecticut House of Representatives: General Election 2012: 88th District
Party	Candidate	Votes	%
Democratic	Brendan Sharkey	7,163	100
Total votes		7,163	100

Connecticut House of Representatives: General Election 2010: 88th District
Party	Candidate	Votes	%
Democratic	Brendan Sharkey	4,027	58.7
Republican	Lesley DeNardis	2,834	41.3
Total votes		6,861	100

Connecticut House of Representatives: General Election 2008: 88th District
Party	Candidate	Votes	%
Democratic	Brendan Sharkey	5,906	64.7
Petitioning Candidate	Matthew J. Corcoran	3,218	35.3
Total votes		9,124	100

Connecticut House of Representatives: General Election 2006: 88th District
Party	Candidate	Votes	%
Democratic	Brendan Sharkey	4,485	94.9
Working Families	Brendan Sharkey	242	5.1
Total	Brendan Sharkey (Incumbent)	4,727	100
Total votes		4,727	100
