= Joseph Canino =

American politician

Member of the Connecticut House of Representatives from the 65th district
- Incumbent
- Assumed office January 8, 2025
- Preceded by: Michelle Cook

Personal details
- Born: 1997 (age 28–29) Torrington, Connecticut, U.S.
- Party: Republican
- Website: https://letsgocanino.com/

Joseph (Joe) Canino (born 1997) (Note: Sources state that he was 27 in 2024) is an American politician and member of the Connecticut House of Representatives since 2024 from the 65th district, which contains part of the city of Torrington. Canino was born and raised in Torrington. He worked as a press aide in the state senate.
