= New Haven Knights =

- City: New Haven, Connecticut
- League: United Hockey League
- Founded: 2000
- Home arena: New Haven Coliseum
- Colors: Purple, silver, black, white

Franchise history
- 2000–2002: New Haven Knights

The New Haven Knights were a minor professional ice hockey team and members of the United Hockey League from 2000 to 2002. They played in New Haven, Connecticut, at the New Haven Coliseum, and were the last team to play at that venue—as well as the last professional team playing in the city—folding when the Coliseum closed in 2002.

The team had a combined record of 75-55-18 in its two seasons, making the playoffs both times. In 2001, they lost in the semi-finals to the eventual champion Quad City Mallards, the next year losing in the first round. The team was coached in both seasons by Paul Gillis, and its leading career scorers were UHL veteran Glenn Stewart and Chicago Blackhawks draftee Mike Pomichter. Five one-time National Hockey League players played for the team at one point, most notably former Boston Bruin Chris Winnes, who played in 67 games for the Knights.

== See also ==
- Professional ice hockey in Connecticut
