= Tom O'Dea (politician) =

American politician

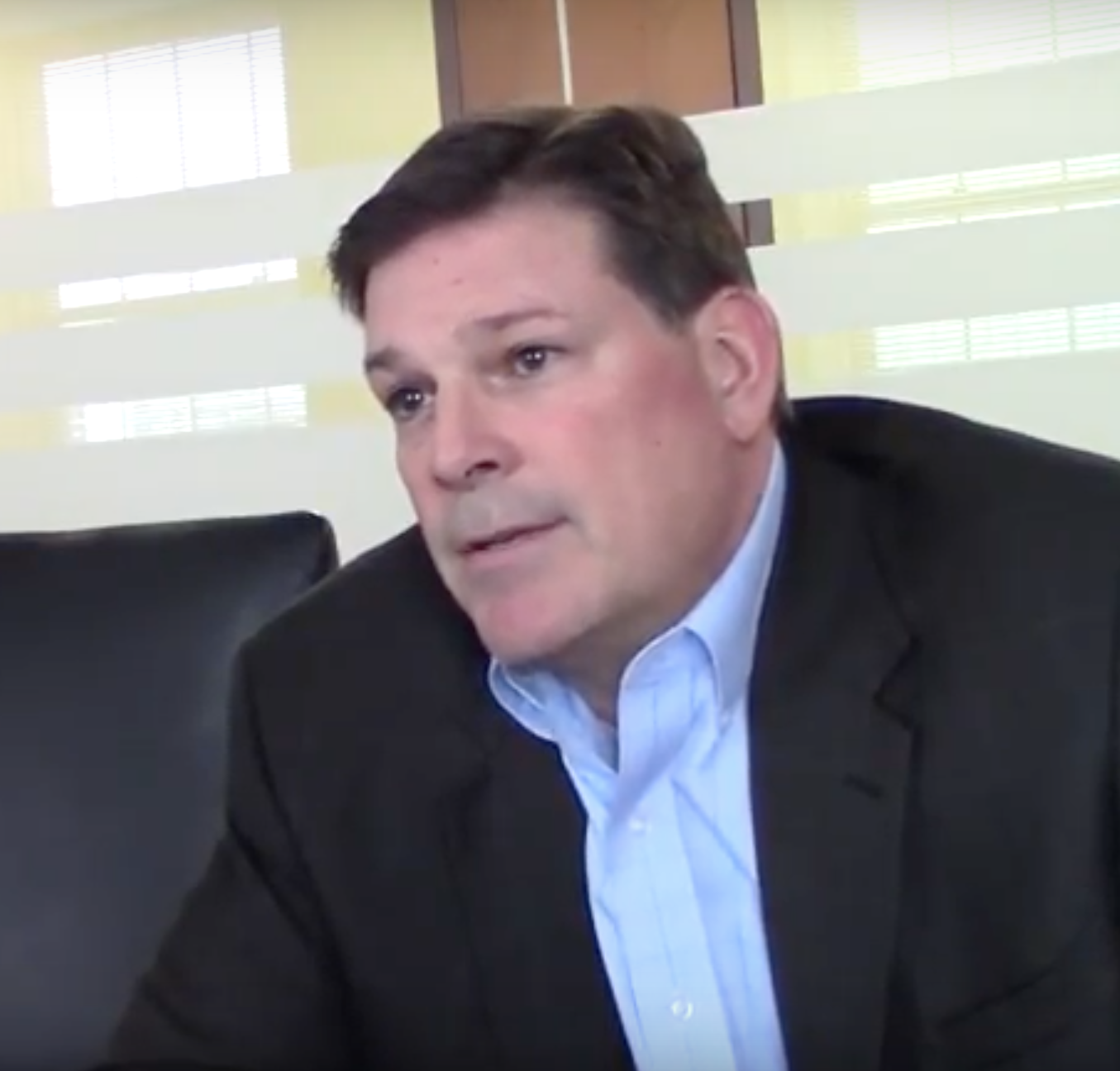
- O'Dea in 2018

Member of the Connecticut House of Representatives from the 125th district
- Incumbent
- Assumed office 2013
- Preceded by: John Hetherington

Personal details
- Born: Thomas Patrick O'Dea; March 31, 1967 (age 59) Philadelphia, Pennsylvania, U.S.
- Party: Republican
- Education: Providence College (BA); Catholic University of America (JD)
- Occupation: Attorney

Thomas Patrick O'Dea (born March 31, 1967) is an American attorney and politician, serving in the Connecticut House of Representatives representing the 125th District. A member of the Republican Party, O'Dea is also in the House Republican Caucus.

== Early life and education ==
O'Dea was born to Thomas Patrick O'Dea, Sr. (1940-2022), a physician, and Madalene Maddy (née Wiggins) in Philadelphia, Pennsylvania. He was raised in an Irish Catholic family in Chadds Ford, Pennsylvania. He completed his undergraduate studies at Providence College, graduating with a Bachelor of Arts (BA) in 1988. Between 1988 and 1991 he completed his Juris Doctor at the Columbus School of Law at the Catholic University of America in Washington, D.C. Between 1986 and 1987 he completed an exchange semester at the University of Fribourg in Switzerland.

== Career ==
He started his career interning at the US Embassy in Bern, Switzerland during his exchange semester in Fribourg in 1987. After returning to the US, he briefly worked for the US Department of Commerce and in the position of Law Clerk at the Executive Office of the President until 1990. In 1991, he entered the private law practice Halloran Sage in Westport, eventually becoming a partner. Since 2014, he has been a counsel for Diserio, Martin, O'Connor & Castiglione in Stamford.

Since 1995, he held various positions at the State of Connecticut. O'Dea served as a Victim Compensation Commissioner (1997-2004), a member of the Police Officer Standards and Training Council (1995-2004) and a member of the Judicial Selection Commission (2004-2007). He was an elected member of the town council of New Canaan, Connecticut between 2005 and 2012, as well as a board member of Staying Put in New Canaan, an association in age care. He was also a board treasurer for Voices of September 11, Inc. another non-profit.

== Politics ==
In 2012, he ran for the State House and won, assuming office in 2013. He successfully ran for reelection in 2018 for his fourth 2-year term, defeating Democrat Ross Tartell in the November election. He ran unopposed in 2020 and began his 5th term in 2021.

=== Committee assignments ===
Tom O'Dea serves on the following committees in the Connecticut House of Representatives:

- Joint Committee on Judiciary
- Transportation Committee
- Joint Committee on Legislative Management
- Environment Committee

== Personal life ==
O'Dea is married to Kerry (née McCarthy), a real estate agent.

They have three children; Thomas (Tommy), Caroline and Michael. O'Dea is a resident of New Canaan, Connecticut.
