= Catherine Parker (politician) =

American politician (died 2003)

Member of the Connecticut House of Representatives from the 125th district
- In office 1977–1983
- Preceded by: Ernest J. Gosselin
- Succeeded by: Gabriel Biafore

Personal details
- Born: 1921 or 1922 Bridgeport, Connecticut, U.S.
- Died: February 3, 2003 (aged 81) Bridgeport, Connecticut, U.S.
- Party: Democratic
- Spouse: John Kenneth Parker
- Children: 3

Catherine "Kay" Parker (1921 or 1922 – February 3, 2003) was an American politician who served in the Connecticut House of Representatives from 1977 to 1983, representing the 125th district as a Democrat.
