= Eric Berthel =

American politician (born 1967)

Member of the Connecticut State Senate from the 32nd district
- Incumbent
- Assumed office March 3, 2017
- Preceded by: Rob Kane

Member of the Connecticut House of Representatives from the 68th district
- In office February 7, 2014 – March 2, 2017
- Preceding: Sean Williams
- Succeeded by: Joseph Polletta

Vice Chairman, Watertown Board of Education
- In office 2011–2014

Personal details
- Born: March 28, 1967 (age 59) Brooklyn, New York, U.S.
- Party: Republican
- Spouse: Krista (m. 1996)
- Children: 2
- Education: Manhattanville College; University of Bridgeport

Eric C. Berthel (born March 28, 1967) is an American politician and a Republican member of the Connecticut Senate, representing the 32nd district since 2017.

== Early life and education ==
Berthel was born in Brooklyn, New York, and attended Pomperaug Regional High School. He has a Bachelor's degree from Manhattanville University in Purchase, New York and a Master's degree from the University of Bridgeport in Bridgeport, Connecticut. He moved to Connecticut in 1976.

== Career ==
In 2011, Berthel was elected to Watertown, Connecticut's Public Schools Board of Education, where he participated in all of the Board's subcommittees (four for which he served as a chair), and served as Board Secretary, Vice Chairman, and interim Chairman, as well as acting as the Board liaison for three of five schools. He served until 2014, when he was elected to the State House of Representatives.

Berthel has been the State Senator for the 32nd Senate District since 2017, representing part of the Naugatuck River Valley and Litchfield County in the Connecticut Senate, including the towns of Bethlehem, Bridgewater, Middlebury (part), Oxford, Roxbury, Seymour (part), Southbury, Washington, Watertown, and Woodbury.

Berthel considered a run for the open congressional seat in Connecticut's 5th congressional district in 2018, but ultimately decided not to run, instead seeking reelection to the state Senate.

In September 2020, Berthel's car was photographed with a window sticker supporting QAnon, a right-wing movement promoting baseless conspiracy theories. After the sticker came to attention on social media, Berthel initially defended the QAnon conspiracy theory by contending that it has "inspired more people to participate in policy and government." Later that month, Berthel apologized, saying, "My failure to look into the movement more deeply, which I take full responsibility for, led me to overlook the extreme views of the movement which I don't subscribe to and find abhorrent. It was my lack of fully understanding this movement that led me to put these words on my car for which I deeply regret." Berthel's Democratic opponent Jeff Desmarais called Berthel's conduct "disqualifying" but Berthel nevertheless won a third term in the November 2020 election.

Berthel has introduced legislation calling for the reintroduction of bear hunting in Connecticut.

== Personal life ==
Berthel and his wife, Krista, have two sons named Matthew and Paul and have lived in Watertown, Connecticut since 1998.
