= Connecticut's 32nd State Senate district =

American legislative district

Senator
Eric Berthel; R

Connecticut's 32nd State Senate district elects one member of the Connecticut State Senate. It consists of the communities of Bethlehem, Bridgewater, Oxford, Roxbury, Southbury, Washington, Watertown, Woodbury, and parts of Bethel, Brookfield, Middlebury and Seymour. It has been represented by Republican Eric Berthel since 2017.

== Recent elections ==
=== 2020 ===
2020 Connecticut State Senate election, District 32
Party	Candidate	Votes	%
Democratic	Jeff Desmarais	23,696	41.80
Republican	Eric Berthel (incumbent)	33,005	58.20
Total votes		56,701	100.00
Republican hold			

=== 2018 ===
2018 Connecticut State Senate election, District 32
Party	Candidate	Votes	%
Republican	Eric Berthel (incumbent)	27,598	61.2
Democratic	Catherine De Carli	17,501	38.8
Total votes		45,099	100.0
Republican hold			

=== 2017 special ===
2017 District 32 Special Election
Party	Candidate	Votes	%
Republican	Eric Berthel	10,160	53.8
Democratic	Greg Cava	8,348	44.4
Independent	Dan Lynch	365	1.9
Total votes		45,099	100.0
Republican hold			

=== 2016 ===
2016 Connecticut State Senate election, District 32
Party	Candidate	Votes	%
Republican	Rob Kane (incumbent)	33,090	65.93
Democratic	Greg Cava	17,099	34.07
Total votes		50,189	100.0
Republican hold			

=== 2014 ===
2014 Connecticut State Senate Election, District 32
Party	Candidate	Votes	%
Republican	Rob Kane	23,547	65.6
Democratic	Donato Orsini	11,383	31.7
Working Families	Donato Orsini	985	2.7
Total votes		35,915	100.0
Republican hold			

=== 2012 ===
2012 Connecticut State Senate election, District 32
Party	Candidate	Votes	%
Republican	Rob Kane (incumbent)	28,591	63.4
Democratic	James C. Gambardella	16,529	36.6
Total votes		45,120	100.0
Republican hold			
