= Howard Luppi =

American politician

Member of the Connecticut House of Representatives from the 88th district
- In office January 4, 1989 – January 9, 1991
- Preceded by: Charles Karjanis
- Succeeded by: Curtis Andrews Jr.
- In office January 7, 1981 – January 7, 1987
- Preceded by: John P. McManus
- Succeeded by: Charles Karjanis

Personal details
- Born: August 27, 1924 West Haven, Connecticut
- Died: June 12, 2017 (aged 92) Wallingford, Connecticut
- Party: Republican

Howard Luppi (August 27, 1924 – June 12, 2017) was an American politician who served in the Connecticut House of Representatives from the 88th district from 1981 to 1987 and from 1989 to 1991.

He died on June 12, 2017, in Wallingford, Connecticut at age 92.
