= Rob Kane =

American politician (1967–2021)

Connecticut Auditor of Public Accounts
- In office January 2, 2017 – February 5, 2021 Serving with John Geragosian
- Succeeded by: Clark Chapin

Member of the Connecticut State Senate from the 32nd district
- In office 2009–2017
- Preceded by: Louis DeLuca
- Succeeded by: Eric Berthel

Personal details
- Born: April 30, 1967
- Died: February 5, 2021 (aged 53) Watertown, Connecticut, U.S.
- Party: Republican
- Spouse: Marcy Kane (divorced 2016)
- Children: 2

Robert J. Kane (April 30, 1967 – February 5, 2021) was an American politician. He was a Republican member of the Connecticut Senate, representing the 32nd district from 2009 to 2017, and served as Connecticut state auditor from 2017 until his death in 2021.

Kane was the State Senator for the 32nd senate district, representing part of the Naugatuck River Valley and Litchfield County in the Connecticut Senate, including the towns of Bethlehem, Bridgewater, Middlebury (part), Oxford, Roxbury, Seymour (part), Southbury, Washington, Watertown, and Woodbury. He was appointed to the position of Auditor of Public Accountants in January 2017, and served in the role alongside Democrat John Geragosian. He lived in Watertown, Connecticut.

Kane graduated from Central Connecticut State University and later earned an M.B.A. from the University of New Haven in 2009.

The former state senator's chief accomplishment as a legislator was the Safe Harbor for Exploited Children Act, which aimed to protect minors who have been victims of human trafficking and increased penalties for traffickers.

Kane was found dead in his home in Watertown, on February 5, 2021, at the age of 53.
