= Joseph Polletta =

American politician (born 1988)

Joe Polletta
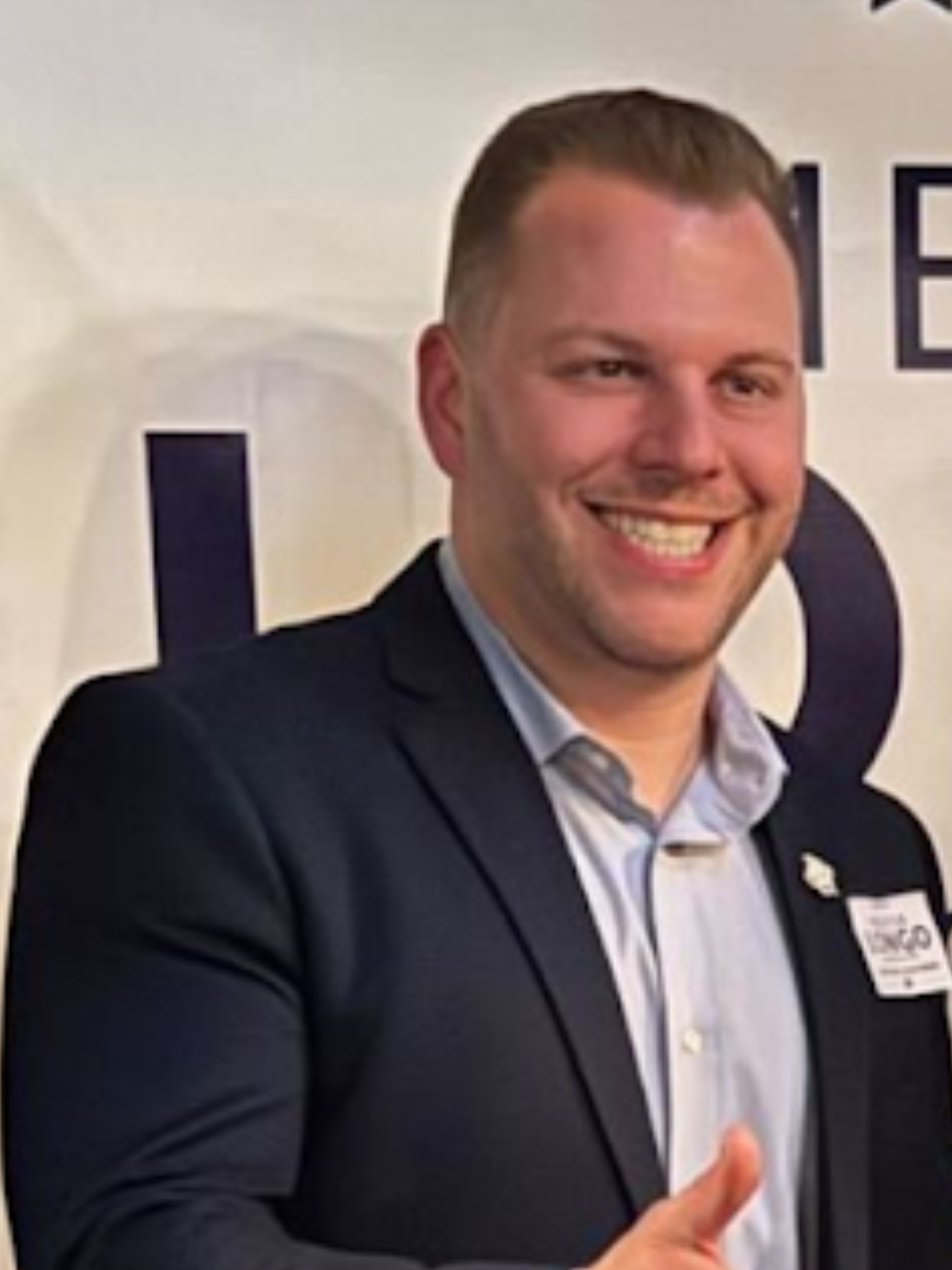
- Polletta in 2024

Member of the Connecticut House of Representatives from the 68th district
- Incumbent
- Assumed office May 1, 2017
- Preceded by: Eric Berthel

Personal details
- Born: Joseph Polletta; September 1, 1988 (age 37) Waterbury, Connecticut, U.S.
- Party: Republican
- Education: Fairfield University (BA)

Joseph Polletta (born September 1, 1988) is an American politician who assumed office as a member of the Connecticut House of Representatives from the 68th district on May 1, 2017.

== Early life and education ==
Polletta was born in Waterbury and raised in Oakville, Connecticut. He earned a Bachelor of Arts degree in political science from Fairfield University.

== Career ==
Joe Polletta, a real estate agent, serves as a member of the Connecticut House of Representatives representing District 68. He is affiliated with the Republican Party. Polletta has been involved in committees including the Committees on Finance, Human Services, and Housing. He holds a Bachelor of Arts degree in political science.

Starting in 2011, Polletta served as a member and vice chair of the Watertown Town Council. In 2015, he served as a community liaison for Congresswoman Elizabeth Esty. He was elected to the Connecticut House of Representatives in a 2017 special election. During the 2019–2020 legislative session, he served as ranking member of the House Labor and Public Employees Committee. In 2021 he became a ranking member of the Housing Committee.
