= Connecticut's 30th House of Representatives district =

American legislative district

Connecticut's 30th State House of Representatives district
Representative
Donna Veach; R

Connecticut's 30th House of Representatives district elects one member of the Connecticut House of Representatives. It encompasses parts of Berlin and Southington. It has been represented by Republican Donna Veach since 2021.

== List of representatives ==
List of Representatives from Connecticut's 30th House District
Representative	Party	Years	District home	Note
Dominic J. Badolato	Democratic	1967–1973	New Britain	Seat created
Robert A. Argazzi	Republican	1973–1975	Kensington	
Philip D. Doran	Democratic	1975–1977	Berlin	
Peter A. Rosso	Democratic	1977–1983	Kensington	
Loren E. Dickinson	Republican	1983–1987	Kensington	
Ann Dandrow	Republican	1987–2003	Southington	
Bob Peters	Republican	2003–2005	Berlin	
Joe Aresimowicz	Democratic	2005–2021	Berlin	
Donna Veach	Republican	2021–	Berlin	

== Recent elections ==
=== 2020 ===
2020 Connecticut State House of Representatives election, District 30
Party	Candidate	Votes	%
Republican	Donna Veach	8,268	55.68
Democratic	JoAnn Angelico-Stetson	6,268	42.21
Working Families	JoAnn Angelico-Stetson	313	2.11
Total votes		14,849	100.00
Republican gain from Democratic			

=== 2018 ===
2018 Connecticut House of Representatives election, District 30
Party	Candidate	Votes	%
Democratic	Joe Aresimowicz (Incumbent)	5,898	50.2
Republican	Michael Gagliardi	5,848	49.8
Total votes		11,746	100.00
Democratic hold			

=== 2016 ===
2016 Connecticut House of Representatives election, District 30
Party	Candidate	Votes	%
Democratic	Joe Aresimowicz (Incumbent)	6,886	51.87
Republican	Christopher Morelli	6,389	48.13
Total votes		13,275	100.00
Democratic hold			

=== 2014 ===
2014 Connecticut House of Representatives election, District 30
Party	Candidate	Votes	%
Democratic	Joe Aresimowicz (Incumbent)	6,556	100.0
Democratic hold			

=== 2012 ===
2014 Connecticut House of Representatives election, District 30
Party	Candidate	Votes	%
Democratic	Joe Aresimowicz (Incumbent)	8,589	100.0
Democratic hold			
