= CT Insider =

Connecticut news website

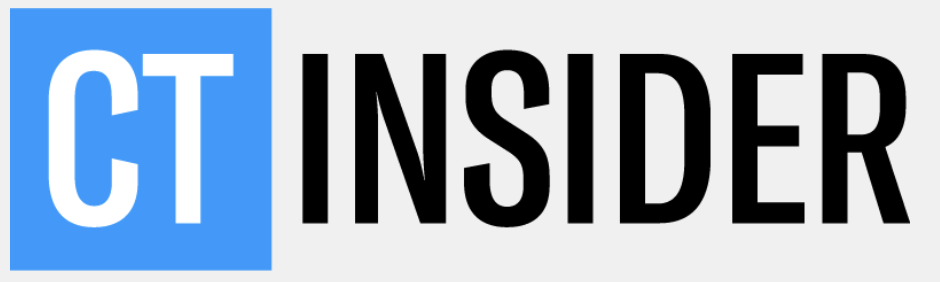
- Type: Daily news, sports and entertainment website
- Format: Digital
- Owner: Hearst Communications
- Publisher: Mike DeLuca
- Editor-in-chief: Wendy Metcalfe
- Website: ctinsider.com

CT Insider is a news website launched in 2019 by the Hearst Corporation. The site covers news, sports, business, entertainment and other topics related to Connecticut.

The website, which has offices in Norwalk, Meriden, Bridgeport, Stamford, and Danbury, Connecticut, is part of Hearst Connecticut Media Group's network of local news websites, newspapers and magazine. CT Insider is the online home for many of Hearst Connecticut's brands, including Connecticut Magazine, GametimeCT, the Republican-American of Waterbury, the Journal Inquirer of Manchester, and the Record-Journal of Meriden.

== History ==
CT Insider was started in 2019 as a subscriber gateway to Hearst Connecticut Media Group's newspaper websites. In 2021, the site relaunched as a regional news site covering statewide topics and areas of Connecticut not traditionally covered by Hearst Connecticut's newspapers. Some of Hearst Connecticut's other brands and newspapers were migrated to CT Insider's website, including Connecticut Magazine, GameTimeCT and the Shoreline Times. Today, the site covers a range of topics related to Connecticut, including breaking news, politics and elections, business, real estate, entertainment and sports, with a heavy focus on the UConn men's and women's basketball teams and high school sports.

== Expansion ==
CT Insider has continued to grow, positioning Hearst Connecticut as "a dominant force in Connecticut's newspaper industry." In June of 2023, Hearst acquired the Journal Inquirer of Manchester and began publishing the newspaper's digital content on CT Insider. In late 2023, Hearst finalized a deal to purchase the RJ Media Group, which includes the Record Journal of Meriden, and moved that newspaper's online presence to CT Insider. In early 2025, Hearst purchased Waterbury's Republican-American newspaper with its website moved under the CT Insider banner.

== Impact of investigations ==
CT Insider reporting on falsified state-police ticket records prompted a statewide data audit by the Connecticut Racial Profiling Prohibition Project and a federal probe by the U.S. Department of Justice. As of October 2025, 18 officers had been disciplined for their part in the scandal.

In response to a CT Insider investigation into the state disability pension program, Connecticut officials proposed an overhaul to the system to detect and prevent fraud and abuse. The state reached a deal with state employee unions on the proposed reforms within months of the investigation's publication.

== Awards ==
A 2023 investigative series that uncovered Freedom of Information violations in Connecticut's largest city earned the 2024 Mitchell W. Pearlman Freedom of Information Award from the Connecticut Foundation for Open Government, as well as the Connecticut Society of Professional Journalists' First Amendment Award. The series also won the 2023 Connecticut Council on Freedom of Information's Stephen A. Collins Memorial Freedom of Information Award.

A 2023 investigation that revealed Connecticut State Police troopers had fabricated traffic tickets received a 2024 National Headliner Award, with judges noting the "series exposes everyday corruption, and restores our faith."

A 2022 investigation into accusations that Connecticut State Police had fabricated traffic tickets won the 2023 Mitchell W. Pearlman Freedom of Information Award, as well as the Connecticut SPJ's Theodore Driscoll Award for Investigative Reporting

A 2022 investigation into the use of restraint and seclusion tactics in schools won the Connecticut SPJ's Stephen A. Collins Public Service Award
