= Connecticut's 125th House of Representatives district =

American legislative district

Connecticut's 125th State House of Representatives district
Representative
Tom O'Dea; R

Connecticut's 125th House of Representatives district elects one member of the Connecticut House of Representatives. From 2003 to 2023, it encompassed parts of New Canaan and Wilton. After 2023, portions of Darien and North Stamford were added to the district, while Wilton was removed. The district has been represented by Republican Tom O'Dea since 2013.

== List of representatives ==
Representative	Party	Years	District home	Note
Thomas F. Dowd Jr.	Republican	1967–1969	Trumbull	
Earl T. Holdsworth	Republican	1969–1973	Trumbull	Redistricted to the 123rd District
Ernest J. Gosselin	Democratic	1973–1977	Bridgeport	
Catherine Parker	Democratic	1977–1983	Bridgeport	
Gabriel Biafore	Democratic	1983–1993	Bridgeport	
Robert T. "Bob" Keeley Jr.	Democratic	1993–2003	Bridgeport	Redistricted to the 129th District
John W. Hetherington	Republican	2003–2013	New Canaan	
Tom O'Dea	Republican	2013–present	New Canaan	

== Recent elections ==
=== 2022 ===
2022 Connecticut State House of Representatives election, 125th District
Party	Candidate	Votes	%
Republican	Tom O'Dea (incumbent)	5,805	53.63
Democratic	Victor Alvarez	5,019	46.37
Total votes		10,824	100.0%

=== 2020 ===
2020 Connecticut State House of Representatives election, District 125
Party	Candidate	Votes	%
Republican	Tom O'Dea (incumbent)	9,762	100.00
Republican hold			

=== 2018 ===
2018 Connecticut House of Representatives election, District 125
Party	Candidate	Votes	%
Republican	Tom O'Dea (Incumbent)	6,522	56.8
Democratic	Ross Tartell	4,959	43.2
Total votes		11,481	100.00
Republican hold			

=== 2016 ===
2016 Connecticut House of Representatives election, District 125
Party	Candidate	Votes	%
Republican	Tom O'Dea (Incumbent)	9,261	87.79
Green	Hector Lopez	1,288	12.21
Total votes		10,549	100.00
Republican hold			

=== 2014 ===
2014 Connecticut House of Representatives election, District 125
Party	Candidate	Votes	%
Republican	Tom O'Dea (Incumbent)	6,073	88.0
Green	David A. Bedell	825	12.0
Total votes		6,898	100.00
Republican hold			

=== 2012 ===
2012 Connecticut House of Representatives election, District 125
Party	Candidate	Votes	%
Republican	Tom O'Dea (Incumbent)	7,780	63.8
Democratic	Mark Robbins	4,183	34.3
Green	David A. Bedell	223	1.8
Total votes		12,185	100.00
Republican hold			
