= Connecticut's 68th House of Representatives district =

American legislative district

Connecticut's 68th State House of Representatives district
Representative
Joseph Polletta; R

Connecticut's 68th House of Representatives district elects one member of the Connecticut House of Representatives. It consists of the town of Watertown and parts of Woodbury. It has been represented by Republican Joseph Polletta since 2017.

== List of representatives ==
List of Representatives from Connecticut's 68th State House District
Representative	Party	Years	District home	Note
Richard R. Martin	Democratic	1967–1973	New London	Seat created
Clyde O. Sayre	Republican	1973–1979	Watertown	
Jack E. Traver	Republican	1979–1981	Watertown	
James H. McLaughlin	Republican	1981–1985	Woodbury	
Herbert A. Darling	Republican	1985–1987	Watertown	
Sean C. Butterly	Democratic	1987–1989	Watertown	
Brian J. Flaherty	Republican	1989–2003	Watertown	
Sean Williams	Republican	2003–2015	Watertown	
Eric Berthel	Republican	2015–2017	Watertown	
Joseph Polletta	Republican	2017–	Watertown	

== Recent elections ==
=== 2020 ===
2020 Connecticut State House of Representatives election, District 68
Party	Candidate	Votes	%
Republican	Joseph Polletta (incumbent)	8,458	64.59
Democratic	Sean Butterly	4,342	33.16
Independent Party	Joseph Polletta (incumbent)	295	2.25
Total votes		13,095	100.00
Republican hold			

=== 2018 ===
2018 Connecticut House of Representatives election, District 68
Party	Candidate	Votes	%
Republican	Joseph Polletta (Incumbent)	7,261	69.0
Democratic	Jeff Desmarais	3,263	31.0
Total votes		10,524	100.00
Republican hold			

=== 2017 special ===
2017 Connecticut House of Representatives District 68 Special election
Party	Candidate	Votes	%
Republican	Joseph Polletta	2,444	78.1
Democratic	Louis Esposito	686	21.9
Total votes		3,130	100.00
Republican hold			

=== 2016 ===
2016 Connecticut House of Representatives election, District 68
Party	Candidate	Votes	%
Republican	Eric Berthel	9,703	100.0
Total votes		9,703	100.00
Republican hold			

=== 2014 ===
2014 Connecticut House of Representatives election, District 68
Party	Candidate	Votes	%
Republican	Eric Berthel	4,670	52.6
Democratic	Joseph Polletta	3,566	40.1
Independent Party	Joseph Polletta	334	3.8
Working Families	Joseph Polletta	312	3.5
Total votes		8,882	100.00
Republican hold			

=== 2012 ===
2012 Connecticut House of Representatives election, District 68
Party	Candidate	Votes	%
Republican	Sean Williams (Incumbent)	8,974	100.0
Total votes		8,974	100.00
Republican hold			
