= Donna Veach =

American politician from Connecticut

Member of the Connecticut House of Representatives from the 30th district
- Incumbent
- Assumed office January 6, 2021
- Preceded by: Joe Aresimowicz

Personal details
- Born: New Britain, Connecticut, U.S.
- Party: Republican
- Spouse: Jeff Veach
- Education: Post University (AS); American Intercontinental University (BBA), (BBA HRM)

Donna Veach is an American politician currently serving as a state representative from the 30th district in the Connecticut House of Representatives. A member of the Republican Party, Veach was elected to the 30th district seat in 2020 after defeating Democratic challenger JoAnn Angelico-Stetson.

== Political career ==
Prior, Veach defeated challenger Jim Townsley for the Republican nomination for the seat. Veach also serves as a councilwoman on the Berlin town council. Veach currently serves as a member of the House Judiciary and Education Committee as well as the Planning and Development Committee.
