= Connecticut's 65th House of Representatives district =

American legislative district

Connecticut's 65th State House of Representatives district
Representative
Joseph Canino; R

Connecticut's 65th House of Representatives district elects one member of the Connecticut House of Representatives. Its current representative is Republican Joseph Canino. The district consists of part of the city of Torrington. It is one of the most electorally volatile districts in the state, having changed hands between parties four times since 2000.

== List of representatives ==
List of Representatives from Connecticut's 65th State House District
Representative	Party	Years	District home	Note
Sidney Axelrod	Democratic	1967–1971	Groton	Seat created
Mary A. Martin	Democratic	1971–1973	Torrington	Did not seek reelection
Addo Bonetti	Democratic	1973–1979	Torrington	Did not seek reelection
John A. Miscikoski	Democratic	1979–1985	Torrington	Defeated for reelection
George P. Avitable	Republican	1985–1993	Torrington	Did not seek reelection
Brian Mattiello	Republican	1993–2001	Torrington	Did not seek reelection
John S. Kovaleski	Democratic	2001–2003	Torrington	Defeated for reelection
Anne Ruwet	Republican	2003–2009	Torrington	Defeated for reelection
Michelle Cook	Democratic	2009–2025	Torrington	Defeated for reelection
Joseph Canino	Republican	2025–present	Torrington	

== Recent elections ==
State Election 2010: House District 65
Party	Candidate	Votes	%	±%
Democratic	Michelle Cook	3,285	50.3	−1.2
Republican	Wendy A. Traub	3,066	47.0	+3.2
Working Families	Michelle Cook	178	2.7	−2.0
Majority		397	6.1	−6.3
Turnout		6,529		
Democratic hold		Swing	-3.2	

State Election 2008: House District 65
Party	Candidate	Votes	%	±%
Democratic	Michelle Cook	4,535	51.5	+2.0
Republican	Anne Ruwet	3,853	43.8	−6.7
Working Families	Michelle Cook	410	4.7	+4.7
Majority		1,092	12.4	+11.4
Turnout		8,798		
Democratic gain from Republican		Swing	+6.7	

State Election 2006: House District 65
Party	Candidate	Votes	%	±%
Republican	Anne Ruwet	3,245	50.5	−2.0
Democratic	Paul E. Cavagnero	3,183	49.5	+2.0
Majority		63	1.0	−4.0
Turnout		6,428		
Republican hold		Swing	-2.0	

State Election 2004: House District 65
Party	Candidate	Votes	%	±%
Republican	Anne Ruwet	4,555	52.5	+2.5
Democratic	Paul E. Cavagnero	4,113	47.5	−2.5
Majority		442	5.1	+5.1
Turnout		8,668		
Republican hold		Swing	+2.5	

State Election 2002: House District 65
Party	Candidate	Votes	%	±%
Republican	Anne Ruwet	3,236	50.0001	+9.2
Democratic	John S. Kovaleski	3,235	49.9999	+2.7
Majority		1	.0002	−5.2
Turnout		6,471		
Republican gain from Democratic		Swing	+6.0	

State Election 2000: House District 65
Party	Candidate	Votes	%	±%
Democratic	John S. Kovaleski	3,691	47.3	+47.3
Republican	Patricia L. Dupret	3,184	40.8	−59.2
Green	Thomas P. Ethier	923	11.8	+11.8
Majority		407	5.2	−94.8
Turnout		7,798		
Democratic gain from Republican		Swing	+53.3	

State Election 1998: House District 65
Party	Candidate	Votes	%	±%
Republican	Brian Mattiello	4,789	100.0	+0.0
Majority		4,789	100.0	+0.0
Turnout		4,789		
Republican hold		Swing	+0.0	

State Election 1996: House District 65
Party	Candidate	Votes	%	±%
Republican	Brian Mattiello	5,875	100.0	+32.7
Majority		5,875	100.0	+65.4
Turnout		5,875		
Republican hold		Swing	+32.7	

State Election 1994: House District 65
Party	Candidate	Votes	%	±%
Republican	Brian Mattiello	4,944	67.3	+18.0
Democratic	Stephanie M. Weaver	1,736	23.6	−2.8
A Connecticut Party (1990)	Stephanie M. Weaver	665	9.1	−15.1
Majority		2,543	34.6	+11.7
Turnout		7,345		
Republican hold		Swing	+18.0	

State Election 1992: House District 65
Party	Candidate	Votes	%	±%
Republican	Brian Mattiello	4,691	49.3	−6.6
Democratic	Robert J. Ingoldsby	2,515	26.4	−17.7
A Connecticut Party (1990)	Jonathan Hutchinson	2,304	24.2	+24.2
Majority		2,176	22.9	+11.2
Turnout		9,510		
Republican hold		Swing	-6.6	

State Election 1990: House District 65
Party	Candidate	Votes	%	±%
Republican	George P. Avitabile	3,966	55.9	−0.3
Democratic	John T. Miscikoski	3,132	44.1	+0.3
Majority		834	11.7	−0.8
Turnout		7,098		
Republican hold		Swing	-0.3	

State Election 1988: House District 65
Party	Candidate	Votes	%	±%
Republican	George P. Avitabile	4,744	56.2	+3.6
Democratic	Gerald R. Reis	3,691	43.8	−3.6
Majority		1,053	12.5	+7.3
Turnout		8,435		
Republican hold		Swing	+3.6	

State Election 1986: House District 65
Party	Candidate	Votes	%	±%
Republican	George P. Avitabile	3,680	52.6	−2.2
Democratic	John A. Miscikoski	3,313	47.4	+2.2
Majority		367	5.2	−4.3
Turnout		6,993		
Republican hold		Swing	-2.2	

State Election 1984: House District 65
Party	Candidate	Votes	%	±%
Republican	George P. Avitabile	5,285	54.8	+12.0
Democratic	John A. Miscikoski	4,366	45.2	−12.0
Majority		919	9.5	−5.0
Turnout		9,651		
Republican gain from Democratic		Swing	+12.0	

State Election 1982: House District 65
Party	Candidate	Votes	%	±%
Democratic	John A. Miscikoski	4,735	57.2	
Republican	Thomas F. Teti	3,538	42.8	
Majority		1,197	14.5	
Turnout		8,273		
Democratic hold		Swing		
