= Maestros (album) =

Studio album by Orquesta El Arranque
- Released: 2004
- Recorded: 2003
- Genre: Tango
- Length: 56:54
- Label: Epsa Music
- Producer: Ignacio Varchausky

Orquesta El Arranque chronology
En vivo en la Rete Due de Suiza (2003)	Maestros (2004)	Nuevos (2008)

Maestros is Orquesta El Arranque's fifth album. It received a nomination for the Premios Gardel in 2005.

== Track listing ==
No.	Title	Music	Guest artist	Length
1.	"Siempre En Pugna"	Raúl Garello	Raúl Garello
2.	"Buenos Aires conoce"	Raúl Garello / Ruben Garello	Raúl Garello
3.	"Kenny"	Raúl Garello	Raúl Garello
4.	"Con cierto vuelo"	Mauricio Marcelli	Mauricio Marcelli
5.	"Después de la media noche"	J. Fontana / Mauricio Marcelli	Mauricio Marcelli
6.	"Diciembre en Buenos Aires"	Mauricio Marcelli	Mauricio Marcelli
7.	"Sol y noche"	Julio Pane / Osvaldo Tarantino	Julio Pane
8.	"Ciudadano de Saavedra"	Cesar Rossi / Julio Pane	Julio Pane
9.	"Milonguetta para Taranta (Tarantina)"	Julio Pane	Julio Pane
10.	"Tiempo cumplido"	Néstor Marconi	Néstor Marconi
11.	"Amor a Buenos Aires"	Néstor Marconi	Néstor Marconi
12.	"Tanjuango"	Néstor Marconi	Néstor Marconi
13.	"A Emilio Balcarce"	Ramiro Gallo	Julio Pane / Mauricio Marcelli / Néstor Marconi / Raúl Garello

== Personnel ==
- Camilo Ferrero (First Bandoneon)
- Ramiro Boero (Second Bandoneon)
- Ramiro Gallo (First Violin)
- Pedro Pablo Pedroso (Second Violin)
- Martín Vázquez (Electric Guitar)
- Ignacio Varchausky (Double Bass)
- Ariel Rodríguez (Piano)
- Ariel Ardit (voice)
- Raúl Garello (invited maestro)
- Mauricio Marcelli (invited maestro)
- Néstor Marconi (invited maestro)
- Julio Pane (invited maestro)
