= Lydia (name) =

Female given name

Lydia/Lidya
- Pronunciation: LID-ee-a or LYE-dee-a
- Gender: Female

Origin
- Origin: Greek
- Meaning: "from Lydia" "beautiful one" "noble one"

Other names
- Nicknames: Lidi, Lids
- Related names: Lidia

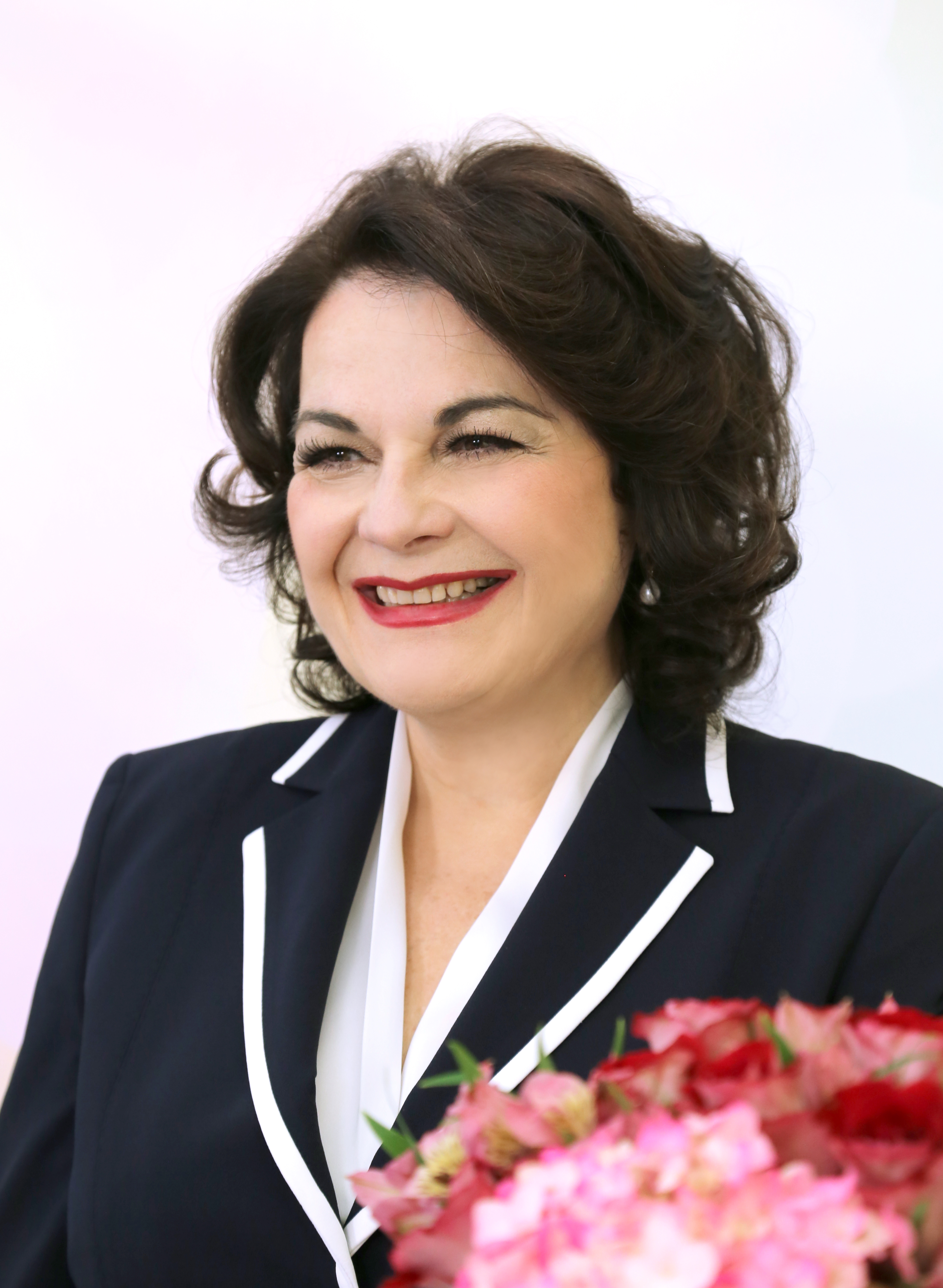
Lydia Sarfati, 2016

Lydia is a feminine first name. It derives from the Greek Λυδία, Ludía, from λυδία (ludía; "beautiful one", "noble one", "from Lydia"), a feminine form of the ancient given name Λυδός (Lydus). The region of Lydia is said to be named for a king named Λυδός; the given name Lydia originally indicated ancestry or residence in the region of Lydia.

== Bible ==
Lydia is a Biblical given name: Lydia of Thyatira was businesswoman in the city of Thyatira in the New Testament's Acts of the Apostles. She was the apostle Paul's first convert in Philippi and thus the first convert to Christianity in Europe. Lydia hosted Paul and Silas after their release from prison. It is possible that Lydia was the host for a house church during that time. According to Coleman Baker, "Lydia is described as a 'worshipper of God' (probably synonymous with 'God-fearer,' used elsewhere in Acts) 'from the city of Thyatira' (located in Western Asia Minor) and 'a dealer in purple cloth' (a luxury item in the ancient Mediterranean). She and her household are soon baptized and offer hospitality to the traveling preachers. Lydia's house becomes the site for the church in Philippi, with her as its host and perhaps leader.... According to the book of Acts, Paul and his associates founded the church in Philippi when Lydia and her household were baptized. One might conjecture that several of the women from the 'place of prayer' were among those who joined with Lydia in this new movement."

== People ==
- Lydia Ainsworth, Canadian composer, producer and singer
- Lydia Alfonsi (1928–2022), Italian actress
- Lydia Alhassan (born 1970), Ghanaian politician
- Lydia Avilova (1864–1943), Russian writer and memoirist
- Lydia Baxter (1809–1874), American poet
- Lydia Becker (1820–1890), British suffragette and amateur scientist
- Lydia Benecke (born 1982), German criminal psychologist and writer
- Lydia Boylan (born 1987), Irish racing cyclist
- Lydia Cabrera (1899–1991), Cuban anthropologist and poet
- Lydia Cacho (born 1963), Mexican journalist, feminist, and human rights activist
- Lydia de Crescenzo, Italian fashion designer working as "Lydia de Roma"
- Lydia Maria Child (1802–1880), American abolitionist, women's rights activist, novelist and journalist
- Lydia Chukovskaya (1907– 1996), Soviet writer, poet, editor, publicist, memoirist and dissident
- Lydia Clarke (1923–2018), American actress and photographer
- Lydia Avery Coonley (1845–1924), American social leader, clubwoman and writer
- Lydia Cornell (born 1953), American actress, blogger and radio talk show host
- Lydia Davis (born 1947), American author
- Lydia R. Diamond (born 1969), American playwright and professor
- Lydia Dunn, Baroness Dunn (born 1940), Hong Kong politician
- Lydia Echevarría (born 1931), Puerto Rican actress
- Lydia Edwards (born 1981), American attorney and politician
- Lydia Field Emmet (1866–1952), American painter
- Lydia Hoyt Farmer (1842–1903), American author, women's rights activist
- Lydia Mary Fay (1804–1878), American missionary, educator, writer, and translator
- Lydia Rodríguez Fernández (born 1980), Spanish pop singer who participated in the 1999 Eurovision Song Contest
- Lydia Foote (1843–1892), English actress
- Lydia Forson (born 1984), Ghanaian actress, writer, and producer
- Lydia Folger Fowler (1823–1879), American physician, professor of medicine, and activist
- Lydia Foy (born 1947), Irish transgender activist
- Lydia Gibson (1891–1964), American artist
- Lydia Griggsby (born 1968), American judge
- Lydia Gromyko (1911–2004), Belarusian agriculturist
- Lydia Haika, Kenyan politician
- Lydia Hatuel-Czuckermann (born 1963), Israeli foil fencer
- Lydia Cromwell Hearne (1874–1961), American physician and civic leader
- Lydia Hearst (born 1984), American model and socialite
- Lydia Holman (1868–1960), American nurse who served in the Spanish-American War
- Lydia Hedberg (1878–1964), Swedish singer
- Lydia Ibtisam (1980–2026), Malaysian actress and singer
- Lydia Jacoby (born 2004), American swimmer
- Lydia Jele (born 1990), Botswana athlete
- Lydia Jennings, Native American soil microbiologist and environmental scientist
- Lydia Kallipoliti, Greek architect, engineer, and architectural historian
- Lydia Kavina (born 1967), Russian theremin player and conductor
- Lydia Kavraki, Greek-American computer scientist
- Lydia Ko (born 1997), Korean-born New Zealand golfer
- Lydia Koidula (1843–1886), Estonian poet
- Lydia Koreneva (1885–1982), Russian-Soviet stage actress
- Lydia Lamaison (1914–2012), Argentine actress
- Lydia Lassila (born 1982), Australian skier
- Lydia Lazarov (born 1946), Israeli yachting world champion
- Lydia Lindeque (1916–1997), South African actor
- Lydia Liliʻu Loloku Walania Kamakaʻeha (Liliʻuokalani), the last Queen regnant of the Hawaiian Kingdom
- Lydia Lipkowska (1882–1958), Russian operatic soprano of Ukrainian origin
- Lydia Litvyak (1921–1943), Russian fighter pilot in World War II
- Lydia Lopokova, Baroness Keynes (1892–1981), Russian ballerina
- Lydia Loveless (born 1990), American alternative country singer-songwriter
- Lydia Lucy (born 1993), English singer and television personality
- Lydia Lunch (born 1959), American No Wave singer
- Lydia Mackay (born 1977), American actress and voice actress
- Lydia Martinez (born 1945 or 1946), American politician
- Lydia Maximus (1938–2026), Belgian politician
- Lydia Mei (1896–1965), Estonian painter
- Lydia Mendoza (1916–2007), American guitarist and singer of Tejano music
- Lydia Miller, Australian arts administrator
- Lydia Millet (born 1968), American author
- Lydia Möcklinghoff (1981–2026), German zoologist
- Lydia Nicole, American actress, comedian, writer and producer
- Lydia Nyati-Ramahobo (1957–2025), Motswana linguistic scholar and activist
- Lydia Night (born 2000), American punk musician
- Lydia Nsekera (born 1967), Burundian sports official
- Lydia Page (born 2002), English actress
- Lydia Pense (born 1948), American singer
- Lydia Pinkham (1819–1883), American patent medicine manufacturer and businesswoman
- Lydia Polgreen (born 1975), American journalist
- Lydia Powell, American politician
- Lydia Reed (born 1944), American child actress
- Lydia Reid (born 1938/1939), American politician
- Lydia Riezouw (1923–2005), Dutch photographer, resistance fighter during World War II
- Lydia Roberts (1879–1965), American nutritionist
- Lydia Rotich (born 1988), Kenyan long-distance runner
- Lydia Sandgren, Swedish author
- Lydia Shattuck (1822–1889), American botanist, naturalist, chemist, and professor
- Lydia Shum (1945–2008), Hong Kong actress and comedian
- Lydia Sigourney (1791–1865), American poet, author, and publisher
- Lydia Simoneschi (1908–1981), Italian actress and voice actress
- Lydia Spivak (1925–1984), Soviet junior sergeant
- Lydia Stahl (1890–?), Russian espionage agent
- Lydia Stephans (born 1960), American speed skater, television producer, and CEO of SportsBubble
- Lydia Thompson (1838–1908), English dancer, comedian, actor and theatrical producer
- Lydia H. Tilton (1839–1915), American journalist and temperance activist
- Lydia Valentín (born 1985), Spanish weightlifter (retired)
- Lydia de Vega (1964–2022), Filipina former athlete
- Lydia Venieri (born 1964), Greek artist
- Lydia Louisa Anna Very (1823–1901), American author and illustrator
- Lydia Wahlström (1869–1954), Swedish historian, author and feminist
- Lydia Weld (1878–1962), American engineer and naval architect
- Lydia White (born 1946), Canadian linguist
- Lydia Wideman (1920–2019), cross-country skier from Finland
- Lydia Williams (born 1988), Australian footballer
- Lydia T. Wright (1922–2006), American pediatrician
- Lydia Zinovieva-Annibal (1866–1907), Russian writer and dramatist
- Lydia Zvereva (1890–1916), Russian aviation pioneer

== Fictional characters ==
- Lydia Martin, a character from the television series Teen Wolf
- Lydia, a character from The Walking Dead comic book series
- Aunt Lydia, in the 1985 novel The Handmaid's Tale
- Lydia Aspen, in the 1952 novel Love for Lydia
- Lydia Wickham (née Bennet), a character from Jane Austen's novel, Pride and Prejudice
- Lydia Rodarte-Quayle, a character from Breaking Bad
- Raven Lydia Baxter, the titular character of That's So Raven
- Lydia Deetz, a character from Beetlejuice.
- Lydia Tár, the titular character from the film Tár

== Other ==
- HMS Lydia, a fictional ship captained by Horatio Hornblower in the C.S. Forester's novel The Happy Return (called Beat to Quarters in the US)
- USS Lydia (SP-62), a US patrol vessel in commission from 1917 to 1919
- USS Lydia (ID-3524), a US cargo ship in commission from 1918 to 1919
- Lydia stone, a stone used to test the quality of gold and silver, a touchstone

== See also ==
- Lidia
- Lidija
- Lidiya
