= Lidija =

Lidija is a feminine given name. Notable people with the name include:

- Lidija Abrlić (born 1969), former Yugoslavian and Croatian basketball player
- Lidija Auza (1914–1989), Latvian painter
- Lidija Bačić (born 1985), Croatian pop singer
- Lidija Bajuk (born 1965), Croatian singer-songwriter and poet
- Lidija Benedetič-Lapajne (born 1959), Slovenian athlete
- Lidija Bizjak (born 1976), concert pianist
- Lidija Bradara, politician from Bosnia and Herzegovina
- Lidija Cvetkovic (born 1967), contemporary Australian poet
- Lidija Dimkovska (born 1971), Macedonian poet, novelist and translator
- Lidija Doroņina-Lasmane (born 1925), Latvian dissident
- Lidija Figner (1853–1920), Russian revolutionary
- Lidija Franklin (1917–2019), American ballet dancer and teacher of Latvian descent
- Lidija Pozaić Frketić (born 1974), member of the World Scout Committee
- Lidija Horvat (born 1982), Croatian handball player
- Lidija Horvat-Dunjko, Croatian opera singer
- Lidija Liepiņa (1891–1985), Latvian chemist
- Lidija Manić (born c. 1953), Serbian beauty pageant titleholder
- Lidija Meškaitytė (1926–1993), Lithuanian painter
- Lidija Mihajlović (born 1968), Serbian sport shooter
- Lidija Osterc (1928–2006), Slovene painter and illustrator
- Lidija Ivanovna Savic-Ljubickaja (1886–1982), Soviet botanist, bryologist, and professor
- Lidija Sotlar (1929–2018), Slovenian ballerina and teacher
- Lidija Turčinović (born 1994), Serbian–French basketball player
- Lidija Vučković (born 1988), Serbian professional basketball player
- Lidija Vukićević (born 1962), Serbian film and TV actress

== See also ==
- Lidia
- Lidiya
- Lydia
