= Dick Mumma =

American basketball player

Personal information
- Born: 1963 (age 62–63) Bedford, Pennsylvania, U.S.
- Listed height: 6 ft 11 in (2.11 m)
- Listed weight: 225 lb (102 kg)

Career information
- High school: Bedford (Bedford, Pennsylvania)
- College: Penn State (1980–1984)
- NBA draft: 1984: 10th round, 211th overall pick
- Drafted by: San Diego Clippers
- Playing career: 1984–1985
- Position: Power forward / center
- Number: 31

Career history
- 1984–1985: P.A.O.K. BC
- Stats at Basketball Reference

Dick Mumma is a retired professional basketball player who played in the United States and Greece. After playing for Bedford High School and Penn State, he was drafted by the San Diego Clippers. He played a year of professional basketball for P.A.O.K. BC in Greece, before retiring from the sport.

== Early years ==
Mumma attended Bedford High School, where he played basketball. As a junior, Bedford went 23–1, and reached the Pennsylvania District 6 Playoffs; before the playoffs began, Mumma suffered a broken ankle, and Bedford lost in the semifinals. He finished the season with 513 points, averaging 21.4 points per game. Returning for his senior year, he scored 761 points at an average of 25.4 per game as Bedford won the District 6 playoffs, with Mumma earning All-State honors from UPI and AP in the process. He was named All-American Top 40 by Adidas, and was listed as one of the country's top 50 players by Basketball Weekly.

== College career ==
After being recruited by Duke, Indiana, Penn State, and Villanova, he ultimately enrolled at Penn State, having been offered a full scholarship – the first Bedford County basketball player to receive one from a Division I school. He signed his letter of intent on March 24, 1980. Playing under head coaches Dick Harter and Bruce Parkhill, he played in more than 100 games for the Nittany Lions, and averaged 5.9 points a game.

== Professional career ==
The San Diego Clippers picked Mumma in the tenth round of the 1984 NBA draft, but he was cut before the regular season began. He played for P.A.O.K. BC in Greece from 1984 to 1985, where he averaged almost 18 points and 12 rebounds per game. He was offered by many teams to return to Europe for a second season but chose to retire from basketball.

== Personal life ==
Mumma married his wife, Kelly Felton, in September 1984.
