= Maggie Ferguson =

Australian violinist and bandoneonista

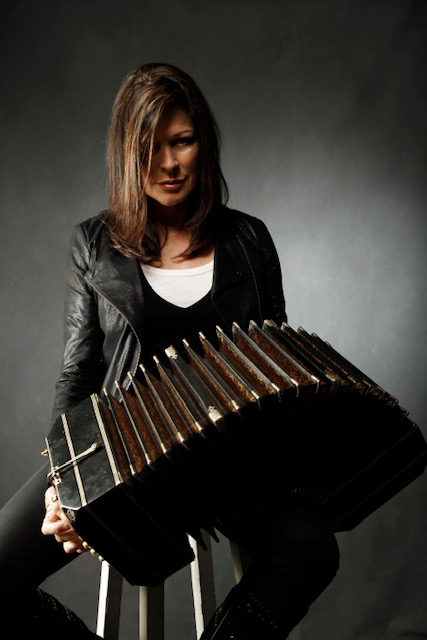

Background information
- Origin: Sydney, Australia
- Genres: Tango
- Occupation: musician
- Years active: 1996 – present

Maggie Ferguson (born in Sydney) is an Australian violinist and bandoneonista. After completing a Graduate diploma in performance at the Sydney Conservatorium of Music in 2002, she studied orchestral tango at Orquesta Escuela de Tango Emilio Balcarce in Buenos Aires from 2003. She completed ongoing studies into all aspects of authentic tango performance, history, arrangement and score analysis with Maestros Emilio Balcarce, Carlos Pazo, Jose Libertella, Nestor Marconi, Leopoldo Federico, Victor Llavallen. She studied bandoneón with Santiago Polimeni, Ramiro Boero, Camilo Ferrero.

In 2009, with the Sydney Youth Orchestras Association (SYO), she created Tango Oz, Australia's first national tango orchestra which she directs from the bandoneon. TangoOz were the focus of Sydney's first Tango Escuela held by the SYO in collaboration with the Conservatorium High School in July 2009 under the guest direction of Ignacio Varchausky and Santiago Polimeni. A second collaboration with Canberra Youth Music occurred in 2010 for Resonate Festival, including William Barton, Ignacio Varchausky and Santiago Polimeni. This showcased the traditional Argentine tango instrument, bandoneon performed with improvised didgeridoo.

She currently performs as a guest artist with a variety of ensembles. She teaches violin and bandoneón in Sydney and arranges Argentine tango for diverse instrumental combinations.

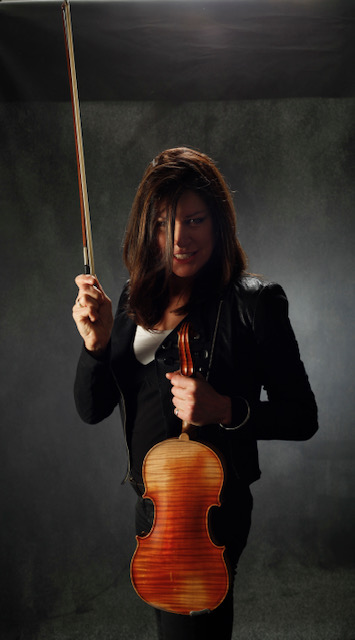

== Employment ==
- 2020 – 2024 Director/bandoneón Tango Orchestra, University of NSW
- 2017 - 2020 Director/bandoneón TangoOz, Conservatorium High School
- 2017 Director/bandoneón Australian Tango Academy, Sydney Youth Orchestra
- 2016 (July) TangoOz tour of Buenos Aires and Montevideo under artistic direction of Victor Lavallen
- 2009-2016 Director/bandoneón TangoOz, Sydney Youth Orchestra
- 2002-2017 Chamber music & tango tutor, Sydney Conservatorium High School, Director of Orchestra ConTango
- 2008-2013 Director of Tango Studies, Riverina Summerstrings, Wagga Wagga, currently directed by Goetz Richter
- 2000-2017 Tango/bandoneón tutor for Sydney Conservatorium of Music students
- 2003-2012 Violin tutor, University of NSW
- 2002-2011 Violin/Orchestral tutor,St Aloysius College, Sydney
- 2003-2008 Violin teacher, tango chamber music tutor, tango ensemble director, Sydney Conservatorium of Music Open A
- Academy
- 2002-2008 Director/violinist Tiempo de Tango
- 2005-2007 Violinist, Chamber music ensemble Trio 233
- 1994-2004 Violinist, Chamber music ensemble Trio Slav

== Festivals ==
Canowindra Baroquefest 2016, Stradbroke Island Chamber Music Festival 2015, Pearl Beach Festival 2015, Royal Botanic Gardens Autumn Vibes Festival 2013, The Rocks Aroma Festival 2011, 2012 & 2013, Sydney Conservatorium Sounds Sensational Festival, Woollahra Festival 2010 & 2012, New England Chamber Music Festival 2012, Argentine Malbec Day, Argentine National Day Festival, Riverina Summerstrings Festival 2008-2013, Canberra Resonate Festival 2009.

== Masterclasses ==
[www.youtube.com/watch?v=cULqi2MDeGA TangoOz to Buenos Aires] (Sydney Conservatorium of Music), Conservatorium High School, New England Conservatorium of Music, Canberra Youth Music, Riverina Conservatorium of Music CSU, MLC Burwood, Shore School, Kincoppal School, St Aloysius College, PLC Burwood, Manly Selective High School, Kildare Catholic College Wagga Wagga. St Andrews Cathedral School, Barker College.

== Grants ==
- COALAR (Council of Australian Latin American Relations) Grant 2008
- Ian Potter Cultural Grant 2008 – (Featured in Annual Report 2008-9)
- Ian Potter Cultural Grant 2005

== Discography ==
- Tango Project Loco Bohemia 2012, recorded in Buenos Aires. Performing on violin and bandoneón, recorded Buenos Aires 2011, with Latin Grammy winner producer, double bassist Ignacio Varchausky, Andres Linetzky, Santiago Polimeni and Guillermo Rubino
- EP TangoOz, 2016 Buenos Aires
- Maggie Ferguson Youtube channel
