= Connecticut's 128th House of Representatives district =

American legislative district

Connecticut's 128th State House of Representatives district
Representative
| Christopher Rosario; D |

Connecticut's 128th House of Representatives district elects one member of the Connecticut House of Representatives. It encompasses parts of Bridgeport and has been represented by Democrat Christopher Rosario since 2015.

== List of representatives ==
| Representative | Party | Years | District home | Note |
|---|---|---|---|---|
| George F. Wright | Democratic | 1967–1969 | Stratford | |
| Marilyn Pearson | Republican | 1969–1973 | Stratford | Redistricted to the 121st district |
| Angelo R. Dente | Republican | 1973–1975 | Bridgeport | |
| Aldona A. Radzwillas | Democratic | 1975–1977 | Bridgeport | |
| William Seres | Republican | 1977–1979 | Bridgeport | |
| Anthony R. Innacell Sr. | Democratic | 1979–1983 | Bridgeport | Redistricted to the 127th district |
| Vincent A. Roberti | Democratic | 1983–1985 | Bridgeport | Redistricted from the 126th district |
| Mario Testa | Democratic | 1985–1989 | Bridgeport | |
| Joseph Grabarz | Democratic | 1989–1993 | Bridgeport | |
| Edna Garcia | Democratic | 1993–2001 | Bridgeport | |
| Lydia Martinez | Democratic | 2001–2007 | Bridgeport | |
| Andres Ayala Jr. | Democratic | 2007–2013 | Bridgeport | Later served as a Connecticut State Senator |
| Christina Ayala | Democratic | 2013–2015 | Bridgeport | |
| Christopher Rosario | Democratic | 2015– present | Bridgeport | |

== Recent elections ==
=== 2020 ===
2020 Connecticut State House of Representatives election, District 128
| Party | Candidate | Votes | % |
|---|---|---|---|
| Democratic | Christopher Rosario (incumbent) | 3,359 | 79.79 |
| Republican | Ethan Book Jr. | 691 | 16.41 |
| Independent Party | Ethan Book Jr. | 101 | 2.40 |
| Petitioning | Wanda R. Simmons | 59 | 1.40 |
| Total votes | | 4,210 | 100.00 |
| Democratic hold | | | |

=== 2018 ===
2018 Connecticut House of Representatives election, District 128
| Party | Candidate | Votes | % |
|---|---|---|---|
| Democratic | Christopher Rosario (Incumbent) | 2,366 | 88.2 |
| Republican | Ethan Book | 317 | 11.8 |
| Total votes | | 2,638 | 100.00 |
| Democratic hold | | | |

=== 2016 ===
2016 Connecticut House of Representatives election, District 128
| Party | Candidate | Votes | % |
|---|---|---|---|
| Democratic | Christopher Rosario (Incumbent) | 3,535 | 86.39 |
| Republican | Ethan Book | 557 | 12.61 |
| Total votes | | 4,092 | 100.00 |
| Democratic hold | | | |

=== 2014 ===
2014 Connecticut House of Representatives election, District 128
| Party | Candidate | Votes | % |
|---|---|---|---|
| Democratic | Christopher Rosario (Incumbent) | 1,504 | 78.3 |
| Republican | Ethan Book | 242 | 12.6 |
| Peace and Progress | Angel Reyes | 174 | 9.1 |
| Total votes | | 1,920 | 100.00 |
| Democratic hold | | | |

=== 2012 ===
2012 Connecticut House of Representatives election, District 128
| Party | Candidate | Votes | % |
|---|---|---|---|
| Democratic | Christina Ayala | 3,332 | 89.4 |
| Republican | Manuel Bataguas | 393 | 10.6 |
| Total votes | | 3,725 | 100.00 |
| Democratic hold | | | |
