= Lidiya =

Lidiya is a feminine given name.

== People ==
- Lidiya Alekseyeva (1924-2014) Russian basketball player
- Lidiya Alfeyeva (born 1946), a Soviet long jumper
- Lidiya Belozyorova (1945–2022), Ukrainian actresses
- Lidiya Ginzburg (1902–1990), a major Soviet literary critic and a survivor of the siege of Leningrad
- Lidiya Grigoryeva (born 1974), a Russian long-distance runner from the Chuvashia region
- Lidiya Krylova (born 1951), a Russian rower who competed for the Soviet Union in the 1976 Summer Olympics
- Lidiya Masterkova (1927–2008), a Russian-born French painter, non-conformist artist in USSR
- Lidiya Osiyuk (1920–1984), Belarusian milkmaid
- Lidiya Rasulova, (1941–2012), Azerbaijani politician
- Lidiya Skoblikova (born 1939), the most successful Olympic speed skater in terms of Olympic gold medals
- Lidiya Sukharevskaya (1909–1991), a Soviet stage actress and playwright renowned for her work with Nikolay Akimov and Andrey Goncharov
- Lidiya Shulaykina (1915–1995), Russian attack pilot during the Second World War
- Lidiya Vertinskaya (1923–2013), Soviet/Russian actress and artist
- Lidiya Zontova (born 1936), retired Russian rower

== Other ==
- 3322 Lidiya (1975 XY_{1}), a main-belt asteroid discovered in 1975

== See also ==
- Lidia
- Lidija
- Lydia
