= Joseph Grabarz =

American politician

Member of the Connecticut House of Representatives from the 128th district
- In office January 4, 1989 – January 6, 1993
- Preceded by: Mario Testa
- Succeeded by: Edna Garcia

Personal details
- Born: 1956 (age 69–70)
- Party: Democratic

Joseph Grabarz is a former American politician, who served in the Connecticut House of Representatives from 1989 to 1993. He is most noted for being Connecticut's first state legislator ever to come out as gay.

Prior to his election to the legislature, Grabarz worked as an assistant in the office of Bridgeport mayor Thomas W. Bucci. He won the Democratic primary in 1988 over Mario Testa, Bucci's cousin, and won the election in November.

On December 17, 1990, Grabarz came out as gay at a press conference. He had already been out in his personal life for a number of years, but realized that even some of his colleagues in the legislature didn't know that he was gay after a Republican legislator questioned the need for a gay rights bill on the grounds that he had never met a gay person. Following his speech, while hugging and thanking well-wishers who had attended the event, he gave a kiss to his friend Greg Campora, and a photograph of that kiss accompanied most media coverage of his announcement. Although he received some negative reaction, his coming out was credited with helping to secure passage of a bill outlawing discrimination on the basis of sexual orientation in Connecticut.

Following the end of his term in office, he took a job as legislative director with the Human Rights Campaign. He was later named executive director of the Connecticut Civil Liberties Union in 1995.
