= Orquesta El Arranque =

Argentine tango orchestra

El Arranque
- Origin: Buenos Aires, Argentina
- Genres: Tango
- Instruments: Piano, First Bandoneón, Second Bandoneón, First Violin, Second Violin, Electric Guitar, Double Bass
- Years active: 1996–present
- Labels: Vaiven, Milan, Epsa Music
- Members: Camilo Ferrero (First Bandoneon); Marco Antonio Fernández (Second Bandoneon); Guillermo Rubino (First Violin); Gustavo Mulé (Second Violin); Martín Vázquez (Electric Guitar); Ignacio Varchausky (Double Bass); Ariel Rodríguez (Piano)
- Past members: Pablo Jivotovschii (1996-2000); Ramiro Gallo (1997-2005); Marcelo Barberis; Ariel Ardit; Pedro Pablo Pedroso; Alejandro Schwarz; Javier Weintraub; Jorge Spessot; Noelia Moncada; Osiris Rodríguez; Ramiro Boero
- Website: www.orquestaelarranque.com.ar

Orquesta El Arranque is an Argentine tango orchestra formed in Buenos Aires in 1996.

== History ==
Founded by double bassist Ignacio Varchausky and bandoneonist Camilo Ferrero and starting off as a quintet, El Arranque developed a repertoire that was readily embraced by the tango community, and by the end of their first year El Arranque had already performed over 200 shows in Argentine theatres and milongas (tango dance halls). El Arranque's debut album, Tango (1998), was sponsored by two legendary figures of the tango world, Leopoldo Federico and Nelly Omar and brought national and international acclaim. In June–July of that same year El Arranque embarked on their first tour to Europe, performing at Tangomania Summer Festival '98 in Bologna, Italy, in Berlin, Stuttgart and Dresden. In December, the orchestra was selected by the Government of the City of Buenos Aires to play for the closing night of the first Festival Internacional de Tango de Buenos Aires with a large outdoor performance on Avenida Corrientes, which was turned into a milonga for the occasion. This event was a huge success for the orchestra and led the Argentine newspapers Clarín and La Nación to describe El Arranque as “the Tango revelation of the year”.

1999 saw the beginning of a second 2-month long European tour of 12 cities, including London, Paris, and Milan. In December, El Arranque was invited again to close the second Festival Internacional de Tango de Buenos Aires.

By the year 2000 the group had established itself as the most important young tango orchestra in the world. In October of that same year El Arranque performed at Romaeuropa Festival in Rome, Italy for the Tango: Buenos Aires a Roma series of concerts. After performing in Lausanne and Padua El Arranque returned to Buenos Aires to record their second CD, Cabulero, sponsored by José Libertella, founder and director of the prestigious Sexteto Mayor.

In January and February 2001, El Arranque toured fifteen cities in The Netherlands with the show Tango de Buenos Aires. In March they returned to Buenos Aires to premiere Cabulero, which also includes a music video as its last track. In May El Arranque performed in New York City with the Lincoln Center Jazz Orchestra, directed by Wynton Marsalis. These concerts included original music (Concerto Grosso, for seven tango musicians and a symphony orchestra, and Suite Borgeana, in seven movements) written for both orchestras by both Wynton Marsalis and by Ramiro Gallo, El Arranque's first violinist. In June the orchestra performed at the Théâtre national de Chaillot in Paris during the Buenos Aires Tango series of concerts. El Arranque ended 2001 with several other performances in Buenos Aires and two more European tours (Festival del Grec in Barcelona, Teatro Trinidade in Lisbon, Festival de Otoño in Madrid and various cities in Germany).

From January to March 2002, El Arranque played 50 concerts in 40 Japanese cities and 10 in Taiwan on the famous Min-On Concert Association Tour. In April, the orchestra performed two concerts at the Kennedy Center in Washington, DC for the Americartes Festival and returned to Buenos Aires to launch their third CD, Clásicos. This CD has sold almost 10,000 copies in Argentina alone, becoming one of the tango best sellers of 2002.

El Arranque travelled to Europe again in November 2002 to record their first live CD, En Vivo en la Rete Due de Suiza. The concert was held in the famous auditorium of Rete 2 Radio in Lugano, Switzerland. The album came out in two versions, a regular one and one with a full-colour book of photographs and quotes, packaged in a hard cover. The tour continued in Italy, Germany and London, with five concerts at Porchester Hall.

In January 2003 El Arranque toured 10 cities in Norway under the auspices of the Norwegian Concert Institute. In February the orchestra took part in the fifth edition of the Festival Internacional de Tango de Buenos Aires, performing before 20,000 people in Avenida Corrientes. Meanwhile, El Arranque also performed once a week in Club del Vino, a music club in Buenos Aires. That same year the group took part in the production and recording of the new CD of tango singer Lidia Borda, Tal vez será su voz, and in November toured Colombia for the first time.

In March 2004, El Arranque won the Carlos Gardel Award for Best Tango Recording of 2003 with their live CD En Vivo en la Rete Due de Suiza. In June the orchestra was invited to take part in the 2004 Genova Tango Festival in Genoa, Italy. The special repertoire it prepared for the occasion included works by maestros Néstor Marconi, Julio Pane, Raúl Garello and Mauricio Marcelli, as invited soloists and composers, with special arrangements by Ramiro Gallo. This extraordinary intergenerational collaboration inspired El Arranque's fifth CD, Maestros. In November 2004 El Arranque was invited to the USA to perform in the International Music and Performing Arts in Communities Tour (IMPACT), presented by the Ohio Arts Council (OAC) in partnership with the Ohio Arts Presenters Network (OAPN), Arts Midwest and the Pennsylvania Council on the Arts with shows in Lancaster, Cleveland, Akron, Dayton, Cincinnati, Sandusky, Springfield, Urbana, Columbus, Newark and Dover in Ohio and in Erie, Allegheny College in Meadville, and Franklin, Pennsylvania. The year ended with performances in Chile and Uruguay and the orchestra was nominated for the Latin Grammy awards.

2005 began with a new tour of Japan, organised once again by the Min On Association, in the wake of El Arranque's huge success in that country. In the space of two months they performed 46 concerts in such cities as Tokyo, Osaka, Kyoto and Sapporo. That same year El Arranque also toured Brazil for the first time, performing in important theatres such as Guairão in Curitiba and Canecão in Rio de Janeiro. The year ended with a series of concerts in the Solís theatre in Montevideo, Uruguay, performances within the framework of the Joventango Festival, and the opening of the Cultural Carnival of Valparaíso in Plaza Sotomayor in front of an audience of over 10,000 people.

In June 2006 the orchestra took part once again in the Buenos Aires Tango III Festival in Chaillot National Theatre in Paris, and also performed again in Stuttgart. In September, El Arranque performed in the first Buenos Aires Tango Festival at the Auditorium Parco della Musica in Rome and in the Biennale de la Danse in Lyon. In December they celebrated their 10-year anniversary with a series of concerts in the club La Trastienda in Buenos Aires, with their colleagues Lidia Borda, Ariel Ardit, Ramiro Gallo and many more who had taken part in the project over the last decade.

March 2007 saw their first trip to Hong Kong to take part in the 35th Hong Kong Arts Festival. They also received the Juan Canaro Prize as the revelation in tango of the last decade, awarded by SADAIC. The orchestra then took part for the second time in the XV Llao Llao Music Week in Bariloche.

In 2008, four years after the release of their last album, El Arranque premiered their sixth CD, Nuevos, in the 25 de Mayo theatre in Buenos Aires. Its sixteen tracks feature the best original works by El Arranque's own musicians and colleagues of their generation. The album came out in two versions, a regular one and a full-colour hard cover boxed set featuring a snakes-and-ladders cum trivia type game inspired by El Arranque's various experiences in the world of tango during the last 12 years. The game features miniature cardboard cutouts of the various members of the group and a miniature die, as well as a trivia booklet. In September the orchestra travelled back to Rome to take part in the second edition of the Buenos Aires Tango Festival at the Auditorium Parco della Musica.

On 30 November 2011 they won the Premio Gardel (Argentina) for Best Album of a Tango Orchestra with their new cd Raras Partituras 6, recorded with Leopoldo Federico.

== Discography ==
- 1998 Tango
- 2001 Cabulero
- 2002 Clásicos
- 2003 En Vivo en la Rete Due de Suiza
- 2004 Maestros
- 2008 Nuevos
- 2011 Raras Partituras 6

== Collaborations ==
- Tal vez será su voz (2003) Lidia Borda
- A tiempo (2008) Noelia Moncada
