= Christopher Rosario =

American politician

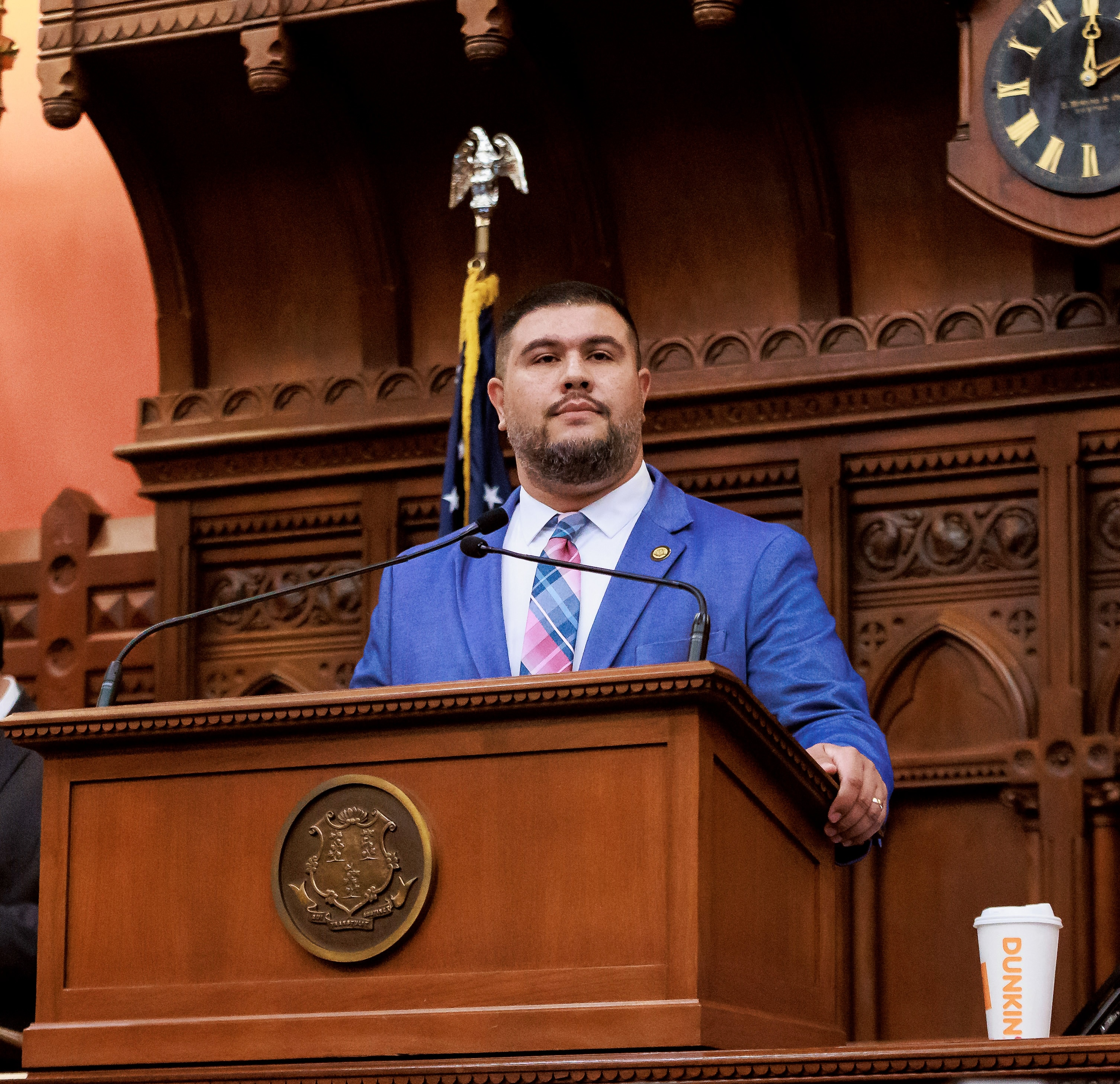

Deputy Speaker Pro Tempore of the Connecticut House of Representatives
- Incumbent
- Assumed office January 2025

Deputy Speaker of the Connecticut House of Representatives
- Incumbent
- Assumed office 2019

Member of the Connecticut House of Representatives from the 128th district
- Incumbent
- Assumed office January 7, 2015
- Preceded by: Christina Ayala

Personal details
- Born: January 28, 1979 (age 47) Bridgeport, Connecticut, U.S.
- Party: Democratic

Christopher Rosario (born January 28, 1979) is an American politician who has served in the Connecticut House of Representatives from the 128th district since 2015.

== Early life and education ==
Rosario was born in Bridgeport, Connecticut, in the East Side neighborhood he currently represents. He is of Puerto Rican descent, with both parents from Aibonito, Puerto Rico. His interest in public service was sparked by Bill Clinton's appearance on MTV's Choose or Lose: Facing the Future with Bill Clinton, where he met Clinton twice – once in 1995 at Andrews Air Force Base and again in 2006 at a campaign rally.

== Political career ==
Before his election to the state legislature, Rosario worked as a legislative liaison to Bridgeport's City Council, where he met his mentor, Andres Ayala. He played a significant role in Ayala's campaigns for state representative and state senate. Rosario later served as the director of blight for the City of Bridgeport under Mayor Bill Finch, where he made strides in reducing property mismanagement.

Elections and legislative roles

- In 2014, Rosario ran for the 128th district seat, defeating the incumbent in a Democratic primary and securing the general election. He has since been re-elected multiple times with significant margins.
- In 2016, he became the chair of the Connecticut Legislative Black and Puerto Rican Caucus, the first Latino from Bridgeport in this position.
- Appointed as deputy speaker of the Connecticut House of Representatives in 2019, making him the first Latino from Bridgeport to hold this role, and only the second Hispanic/Latino in state history.
- As of January 2025, he was named Deputy Speaker Pro Tempore.

Committee Assignments

- Appropriations Committee (Subcommittee Chair on Transportation)
- Transportation Committee
- Government Administration and Elections Committee

Other Political Activities

- Served as one of Connecticut's seven Democratic presidential electors in 2016, casting his vote for Hillary Clinton.

== Community involvement ==
Rosario is deeply engaged in both local and national community initiatives:

- He serves on the executive board of the Board of Latino Legislative Leaders and is a Lifetime Member of the National Association of Latino Elected and Appointed Officials (NALEO).
- Involved with the Greater Bridgeport Latino Network, Fairfield County Hispanic Business Chamber, and helped co-found the Bridgeport Hispanic Heritage Committee.
- Served on the board of managers for Alpha Community Services, organizing the Annual Walk to End Homelessness.
- Was co-chair of the Connecticut Complete Census Count Committee, focusing on diverse representation.

== Personal life ==
Rosario resides in Bridgeport with his family.
