= Lidia (given name) =

Lidia is a feminine name. It is the Greek, Italian, Polish, Romanian, and Spanish transcription of the name Lydia.

== People ==
Notable people with the name include:

- Lidia Argondizzo (born 1960), Australian politician
- Lidia Bastianich (born 1947), American chef, author, television presenter and restaurateur
- Lidia Bobrova (born 1952), Russian film director
- Lidia Borda (born 1966), Argentinian tango singer
- Lidia Chmielnicka-Żmuda (1939–2002), Polish volleyball player
- Lidia Chojecka (born 1977), Polish middle distance runner
- Lidia Desmond, Argentine actress, vedette, and singer
- Lidia Doce (1916–1958), Cuban revolutionary
- Lidia Drăgănescu (born 1967), Romanian handball player
- Lidia Elsa Satragno (1935–2022), Argentine entertainer and politician
- Lidia Falcón (born 1935), Spanish politician and writer
- Lidia Geringer de Oedenberg (born 1957), Polish politician and Member of the European Parlement
- Lidia Gueiler (1921–2011), the first female President of Bolivia
- Lidia Grychtołówna (born 1928), Polish pianist
- Lidia Ivanova (1936–2007), Russian print and television journalist, television announcer and writer
- Lídia Jorge (born 1946), prominent Portuguese writer
- Lidia Klement (1937–1964), Soviet singer
- Lidia Kopania (born 1978), Polish singer (Kind of Blue)
- Lidia Menapace (1924–2020), Italian resistance fighter and politician
- Lidia Poët (1855–1949), the first modern female Italian advocate
- Lidia Quaranta (1891-1928), Italian actress
- Lidia Ravera, Italian writer, journalist, essayist and screenwriter
- Lidia Rudnicka (born 1960); Polish-American researcher and dermatologist
- Lidia Ruslanova (1900–1973), Russian folk singer
- Lidia Semenova (born 1951), Ukrainian chess Woman Grandmaster
- Lidia Șimon (born 1973), Romanian long-distance runner
- Lidia Staroń (born 1960), Polish politician
- Lidia Talpă (born 1982), Romanian sprint canoeist
- Lidia Trettel (born 1973), Italian snowboarder and Olympic medalist
- Lidia Thorpe, Australian politician and activist
- Lidia Wysocka (1916–2006), Polish actress
- Lidia Yusupova (born 1961), the Coordinator of the law office of the Moscow-based human rights organization Memorial
- Lidia Zamenhof (1904–42), Polish writer, publicist, translator and the youngest daughter of Ludwik Zamenhof, the creator of the international language Esperanto
- Lidia Zamkow (1918–1982), Polish theatre actress and director

== Other ==
- List of storms named Lidia, six eastern Pacific Ocean tropical cyclones
- Lidia Sobieska, the fictional prime minister of Poland in Tekken 7, a fighting game in Bandai Namco's Tekken franchise.

== See also ==
- Lidiya
- Lydia
