= TangoVia Buenos Aires =

Argentine non-profit organization

- Founded: 2002
- Founder: Ignacio Varchausky
- Purpose: Creation, promotion and preservation of tango-related projects
- Location: Buenos Aires, Argentina
- Website: tangovia.org

Founded in 2002 by its artistic director Ignacio Varchausky, TangoVia Buenos Aires is a non-profit organization for progressive arts - focused on preservation but dedicated to creation - that brings together artists, researchers, producers and cultural institutions for the preservation, development, and promotion of the art of tango in Buenos Aires and around the world. Since TangoVia Buenos Aires understands tango as a constantly evolving living art form, it promotes all of its formats as contemporary and alive.

== Goals ==
The organization's main goal is the development and implementation of educational and preservation projects linked to tango, especially the recovery of original sheet music, recordings, films and all other historical material related to the genre. TangoVia Buenos Aires also produces festivals, concert seasons, books and educational tools, documentaries and CDs.

== Teaching Activities ==
Since its inception, TangoVia Buenos Aires has worked with the Orquesta Escuela de Tango Emilio Balcarce (“Emilio Balcarce” Tango Orchestra School), created by artistic director Ignacio Varchausky and directed today by the prestigious maestro Néstor Marconi. The award-winning documentary “Si Sos Brujo: A Tango Story” — directed by Caroline W. Neal and co-produced by TangoVia Buenos Aires — traces the birth and development of this pedagogical programme based on oral transmission, thanks to which young musicians learn the orchestral styles of tango, its language and secrets, directly from great musicians who played in the orchestras of the 1940s and 1950s and remain active today.

== Digital Tango Archive ==
Officially presented on 17 June 2009, the Digital Tango Archive is TangoVia's effort to recover lost materials relating to the history of tango recordings. The Digital Tango Archive already houses over 700 original arrangements for the tango orchestra (orquesta típica) and more than 600 for bandoneon solos. Through the digitalisation of high quality recordings, high resolution digital scanning of photographs, scores, musical arrangements and the correct transcription of video archives, a security copy is being created of the existing material. Its classification according to multiple criteria enables this material, once reserved to a few scholars, to be offered to everyone for free consultation. In Argentina there are at least one hundred thousand tango recordings made between 1902 and 1995 (end of the analogical era). However, less than 20% of this material is available on CD. There are already three thousand recordings that appear in catalogues, and thousands of hours of radio and TV programmes, which no longer exist in any format and have been lost forever.

== Artistic Productions ==
Through a series of activities, TangoVia Buenos Aires has contributed to the promotion, preservation and first-hand enjoyment of the art of one of the most influential Argentine musicians in history: Horacio Salgán. One example is the artistic production of the CD “Raras Partituras 4” featuring Salgán’s unknown compositions and arrangements for both tango orchestra (recorded by the Gran Orquesta TangoVia Buenos Aires) and for piano solo (recorded by Andrés Linetzky). The CD was produced in collaboration with the Biblioteca Nacional de Argentina (Argentina's National Library) and was followed by the book “Arreglos para orquesta típica: Tradición e innovación en manuscritos originales” (Arrangements for a Typical Tango Orchestra: Tradition and Innovation in Original Manuscripts), co-published with the National Library and offering for the first time Salgán’s original arrangements for tango orchestra, as well as an analysis, bibliography and catalogue of Salgán’s work.

Since TangoVia Buenos Aires believes the tango tradition continually reinvents itself, it produces new recordings and festivals every year, featuring today’s most notable artists in contemporary tango. Since 2003 TangoVia Buenos Aires has been the artistic producer of the Buenos Aires Tango Festival in Paris, in conjunction with the National Theater Palais Chaillot; 2008 marked the fourth edition of this festival. Other productions include the Festival Montpellier Danse 03, the Festival Buenos Aires Tango in the Auditorium Parco della Musica in Rome in both 2006 and 2008, and the Festival TangoVia Buenos Aires in both Genoa, Italy, and Lille, France, in 2005.

In the field of CD production, TangoVia Buenos Aires has launched two series. One of them is "El arte del bandoneón" (The Art of the Bandoneon). This series intends to create and preserve a kind of musical memory: a unique register of the most outstanding contemporary bandoneon players, recorded intimately playing solos on the bandoneon. The series began with the CD “Instantaneas” by Julio Pane and continued in 2008 with the CDs “Tiempo Esperado” by Néstor Marconi, “Mi Fueye Querido” by Leopoldo Federico, which won the 2009 Latin Grammy Award for Best Tango Album, and “Mi Refugio” by Walter Rios. The second series “El arte de la orquesta típica" (The Art of the Tango Orchestra) began with “Amanecer Ciudadano” featuring an orchestra directed by the renowned bandoneonist Víctor Lavallén.

== Support ==
TangoVia Buenos Aires is supported by numerous public and private institutions, both in Argentina and abroad, including The Government of the City of Buenos Aires, la Sociedad Argentina de Autores y Compositores de Música (SADAIC), la Asociación Argentina de Intérpretes Musicales (AADI), Universidad Nacional de Quilmes, Biblioteca Nacional de la Republica Argentina, Instituto Nacional de Cine y Artes Audiovisuales (INCAA), Festival de Tango Buenos Aires, IICES, Jazz at Lincoln Center, CODARTS (Conservatory of Rotterdam), Sydney Youth Orchestra, Fondazione Musica per Roma and Parco della Musica, Publishing Houses Warner/Chappell Music and Epsa Publishing, and the Foundation “La Casa del Tango”.
