= Terry Backer =

American politician (1954–2015)

Member of the Connecticut House of Representatives from the 121st district
- In office 1993–2015
- Preceded by: Robert Frankel
- Succeeded by: Joe Gresko

Personal details
- Born: Terrance Eddy Backer; August 3, 1954 Stamford, Connecticut, U.S.
- Died: December 14, 2015 (aged 61) Bridgeport, Connecticut, U.S.
- Party: Democratic
- Occupation: Fisherman, soundkeeper, politician

Terrance Eddy Backer (August 3, 1954 – December 14, 2015) was an American politician who served in the Connecticut House of Representatives from 1993 until his death in 2015, representing the 121st district as a Democrat.

== Early life ==
Backer was born in Stamford, Connecticut, to Henry Jacob Backer, Jr., and Catherine (née Lagana) Backer. He attended public schools in Norwalk, Connecticut, and later earned a license as a Merchant Marine Officer from the United States Coast Guard Examining Unit at New York City.

Backer received an Arborist license from the Connecticut Tree Examining Board, certifying him as an expert in the care of trees. Backer is a third-generation fisherman and engaged in lobster and shell fishing with his father in the Long Island Sound for many years.

== Political career ==
Backer was first elected to represent the 121st district of the Connecticut House of Representatives on November 3, 1992. He defeated Kevin C. Kelly 4,470 votes to 3,981. He was re-elected on November 4, 2014 and served continuously until his death during his 12th term on December 14, 2015.

"Backer ... served in numerous positions in the legislature, including; Vice Chairman of the Appropriations Committee, Chairman of the Energy and Technology Committee, Assistant Majority Leader and Assistant Majority Whip. Backer has also held the position of House Chairman of the Appropriation subcommittee on Conservation and Development." He held the position in the Connecticut General Assembly of House Chairman of the Appropriation Subcommittee on Conservation and Development. He chaired the subcommittee from 1993 to 2008 and again for the 2009-10 term. The subcommittee is tasked with crafting the budget for the Department of Environmental Protection, the state Labor Department, the Department of Economic Development and Housing and the Culture and the Tourism Board and the Department of Agriculture, as well as other state agencies.

During his tenure as Chairman of the Energy and Technology Committee (2002–2003), Backer oversaw and wrote the cleanup legislation for the State of Connecticut's 1998 Electric Deregulation and Restructuring law. He added improvements to the environmental and renewable energy components to the law. Backer expanded the Renewable Portfolio Standards, created Project 100, a renewable energy program design to implement renewable generation in the state, and passed the Energy Efficiency Standards of Commercial Appliances bill.

Backer's Committee assignments for the 2009-10 legislative session were the Appropriations Committee, the Environment Committee and the Energy and Technology Committee. Backer focused his activities in the Environment Committee on water quality improvements and the reduction of pollution from stormwater. His activities in the Energy and Technology Committee focused on renewable energy and energy security with a special interest in Peak oil concerns. House Speaker for the 2009-10 legislative session, Chris Donovan (D-Meriden) appointed Representative Backer to chair a newly created sub-committee on Clean Energy and Energy Efficiency.

In February 2005, while serving as vice chairman of the National Conference of State Legislatures' Energy Committee, Backer wrote an article for State Legislatures Magazine, a publication of the National Conference of State Legislatures (NCSL), titled Freedom From Fossil Fuel. In the article, he criticized the federal government and past administrations for their failure to prepare the nation's infrastructure for a contraction of the conventional fossil fuel supply and the resulting impact on the nation. He also proposed that the states take the lead rather than relying on Congress or the administration.

In July 2007, Backer and State Rep. Bob Duff co-founded the Connecticut General Assembly's Peak Oil and Natural Gas Caucus. The Caucus was formed to investigate the status of world petroleum based fuel supply, the impact of escalating cost on the society and the economy, and post carbon fuel implications for the current government planning process.

In November 2007, the Legislative Peak Oil and Natural Gas Caucus, with Backer as the lead author, released a report to the Connecticut General Assembly and the Governor titled "Peak Oil Production and the Implications to the State of Connecticut." The report was an outgrowth of the work of the caucus Backer and Duff co-founded earlier that year. The report was the first of its kind to state legislatures. During the 2008 legislative session, Representative Backer authored the Energy Scarcity and Security Act which was passed into law. The act begins a scenario planning process and establishes two functions. A report and study on energy concerns and the formation of a task force. The Energy Scarcity and Security Task Force was formed to make recommendation regarding the findings of a report that will investigate the impact of rising energy cost and both major and short term supply disruptions on the state's ability to provide services and the impact on the state's economy and cost to citizens. He was appointed as co-chair of the task force, along with Senator Bob Duff of Norwalk, Connecticut, who was appointed by the President Pro Temp of the Senate.

In September 2008, Backer received the Congressman Roscoe Bartlett Speaking Truth to Power award from the Association for the Study of Peak Oil and Gas (ASPO-USA). The award was given at Sacramento, California during the ASPO-USA annual meeting. Representative Backer was awarded the honor for his work on two landmark reports to the Connecticut legislature and the state's Governor regarding diminishing flows of oil due to resource depletion and geopolitical problems facing global oil production. The reports focused on global conditions and addressed impending cost and availability, as well as, potential shortages to the state.

== Background ==
=== Connecticut Coastal Fishermen's Association ===
In 1984, after witnessing degrading water quality in Long Island Sound, Backer, along with Chris Staplefelt, another local fisherman, co-founded the Connecticut Coastal Fishermen's Association. The fishermen's association was modeled after the Hudson River Fishermen's Association based in Garrison, New York. Staplefelt and Backer had been buying Buck Shad in the spring of the year for lobster bait from Bob Gabrielson, a Nyack, New York, shad fisherman. After hearing complaints of continued pollution problems in Long Island Sound, Gabrielson, introduced Backer and Staplefelt to John Cronin, then the Hudson Riverkeeper, who with the help of the New York City based law firm of Berle, Kass and Case, now dissolved, established the Connecticut Coastal Fishermen's Association. Once established, Backer, Cronin and Staplefelt laid out an aggressive plan to track down municipal and corporate polluters of the Sound, and bring them to court to abate the pollution of the Sound.

Backer became the group's president, investigator and public point man. The Fishermen's Association, under Backer, brought federal Clean Water Act lawsuits against several Connecticut municipalities for violations of their National Pollution Discharge Elimination Systems Permits. The suits included; Norwalk, Bridgeport, Stratford and Milford, as well as other cities in Connecticut. The Fishermen's Association's set the tone for the hard nosed legal defense of the Long Island Sound. Backer would later bring these tactics to the role of Soundkeeper.

=== Soundkeeper ===
Terry Backer (2006)

In 1987 Backer founded, along with John Cronin, the Hudson Riverkeeper and Robert F. Kennedy Jr., Chief Attorney for the Hudson Riverkeeper the Long Island Soundkeeper Fund Inc. That same year, Backer became the first Soundkeeper for Long Island Sound and executive director of the not for profit environmental protection organization based in Norwalk, Connecticut.

The Long Island Soundkeeper Fund, was the second "Keeper" based organization and was preceded only by the Hudson Riverkeeper Fund. Long Island Soundkeeper was started by using a portion of stipulated penalties of $87,000.00 from a settlement based on a Clean Water Act lawsuit with the City of Norwalk, Connecticut.

With Backer as Executive Director/Soundkeeper, Soundkeeper Inc. has brought many Clean Water Act lawsuits against polluters of Long Island Sound including New York City, as well as, a federal lawsuit challenging the United States Environmental Protection Agency's rule making regarding cooling water intakes from power plants.

In addition, to its legal activities Soundkeeper Inc., under Backer's leadership, restored salt marshes in the Bronx, New York. and has pioneered the use of catch basin filters to clean polluted storm water of bacteria, metals, and hydrocarbons before it enters Long Island Sound, as well as numerous other projects.

=== The Founding of a Movement - Waterkeeper Alliance ===
Many "Waterkeeper" organizations formed at the grassroots. The concept of protecting the environment as defined by the work of Cronin and Backer, was spreading quickly. John Cronin, the Hudson Riverkeeper introduced the vision of a national alliance of "Keepers" and after several experiments the Waterkeeper Alliance emerged in 1999. Backer played a leading role in forming the Waterkeeper Alliance in its formative years along with Robert F. Kennedy Jr., currently Chairman of Waterkeeper Alliance, Andrew Wilner, the New York/New Jersey Baykeeper, Joe Payne the Casco Baykeeper, Michael Herz, the former San Francisco Bay keeper and Terry Tamminen the former Santa Monica, California, Baykeeper.

In 2007, the office of president and vice president of the Waterkeeper Alliance were renamed to chairman and vice chairman at the annual meeting of the Alliance. Backer has helped guide and grow the Waterkeeper Alliance to 188 autonomous Waterkeepers on six continents.

== Death ==
Backer died on December 14, 2015, in Bridgeport, Connecticut, from complications related to the treatment of brain cancer.
