= Galina Skakun =

- Галина Скакун
- Born: Galina Fedorovna Osiyuk; 10 October 1943; Barysy, Tamašoŭski sieĺsaviet, Brest region, Byelorussian Soviet Socialist Republic, Soviet Union
- Died: 25 March 2022 (aged 78)
- Occupations: Cattle breeder; Milkmaid
- Spouse: Dmitry Vasilyevich Skakun
- Children: 2
- Mother: Lidiya Osiyuk (mother)
- Awards: Medal "For Labour Valour"; Order of the Badge of Honour; Hero of Socialist Labour; Order of the Red Banner of Labour; Order of Lenin (x2)

Galina Fedorovna Skakun (Belarusian: Галіна Фёдараўна Скакун; Russian: Галина Фёдоровна Скакун; 10 October 1943 – 25 March 2022) was a Belarusian cattle breeder and milkmaid. She began working when she was a child, helping her mother Lidiya Osiyuk, run their own farm and the Zhdanov collective farm. Skakun was a deputy of the Congress of People's Deputies of the Soviet Union and the Supreme Soviet of the Soviet Union. She was a recipient of the Medal "For Labour Valour", the Order of the Badge of Honour, the Hero of Socialist Labour, the Order of the Red Banner of Labour and the Order of Lenin twice.

== Early life ==
Skakun was born in the German-occupied village of Barysy, Tamašoŭski sieĺsaviet, Brest region, Byelorussian Soviet Socialist Republic on 10 October 1943. Her family was made up of farmers. Shakun's mother was the milkmaid Lidiya Osiyuk, while her father died of tuberculosis in prison in 1944 after refusing to join the German auxiliary police, a few months after Skakun was born. She received a secondary education.

== Career ==
From an early age, Shakun was introduced to hard labour on a farm by her mother while she was attending school. She helped her mother run their own farm and also did work at the Zhdanov collective farm (today the Belarus collective farm). Shakun was on the dairy farm but also on the adjacent plot, on which forage crops were grown, alongside adults. Growing up, she observed how her mother worked. Shakun extracted 5,000 kg (11,000 lb) or more from each grow, which increased to 8,000 kg (18,000 lb) by the end of her working life.

Following her graduation from school, she continued to work on the farm until early 1965 when she began working independently as a milkmaid and then as a machine milking operator and a livestock breeder at Zhdanov collective farm. Shakun was given a group of 16, first-calf heifers that were chosen from her mother's group of cows. She exceeded her pledge to extract 4,500 kg (9,900 lb) of milk from each cow; her personal record was 8,300 kg (18,300 lb) from one cow. Shakun introduced new intensive technologies and advanced labour management methods into production at the farm. She was a frequent winner of the district and regional socialist competitions and took part in the Exhibition of Achievements of National Economy, winning three gold medals, three silver medals and five bronze medals. Shakun also introduced family labour to the farm during the twelfth five-year plan from 1986 to 1990 and the average milk yield in her group in 1987 was 8,300 kg (18,300 lb) for each cow.

Shakun was a delegate to the Fourth All-Union Congress of Collective Farmers in 1988. From early 1989 to 1991, she was a deputy of the Congress of People's Deputies of the Soviet Union from collective farms united by the Union Council of Collective Farms. Shakun was also a deputy of the Supreme Soviet of the Soviet Union as well as a deputy of the local Council of People's Deputies. She and two delegates visited Czechoslovakia and Poland on business trips, discussed agricultural development issues and shared personal experiences. Shakun retired in 1993 but continued working on the Belarus collective farm as a milking machine operator until 2006 when she left to care for her husband.

== Personal life ==
She married the radio operator Dmitry Vasilyevich Skakun on 14 October 1961. Her husband worked on the farm with her. They had two children. Shakun died on 25 March 2022.

== Awards ==
She was a recipient of multiple state awards. Shakun got the Medal "For Labour Valour" on 22 March 1966, her first award. She received her first honour, the Order of the Badge of Honour, on 8 April 1971. Shakun went on to be awarded the Order of the Red Banner of Labour on 6 September 1973 and the Byelorussian SSR State Prize in 1980 "for outstanding achievements in labour". She was presented with the Order of Lenin on two occasions, firsts on 21 December 1983 and secondly on 17 August 1988. Shakun was made a Hero of Socialist Labour with the "Hammer and Sickle" gold medal in 1988 and a Honoured Worker of Agriculture of the Republic of Belarus in 1997. She was also an Honorary Citizen of the Brest District and an Honorary Veteran of the Brest District Veterans Organisation.
