= Marilyn Pearson =

American politician

Member of the Connecticut House of Representatives from the 128th district
- In office 1969–1973
- Preceded by: George F. Wright
- Succeeded by: Angelo R. Dente

Member of the Connecticut House of Representatives from the 121st district
- In office 1973–1975
- Preceded by: Clarence I. Platt
- Succeeded by: Lawrence E. Palaia

Personal details
- Party: Republican
- Spouse: H. Edward Pearson

Marilyn Pearson is an American politician who served in the Connecticut House of Representatives from 1969 to 1975. A Republican, Pearson represented the 128th district from 1969 to 1973, and the 121st district from 1973 to 1975. She lived in Stratford during her tenure.
