= Joe Gresko =

American politician

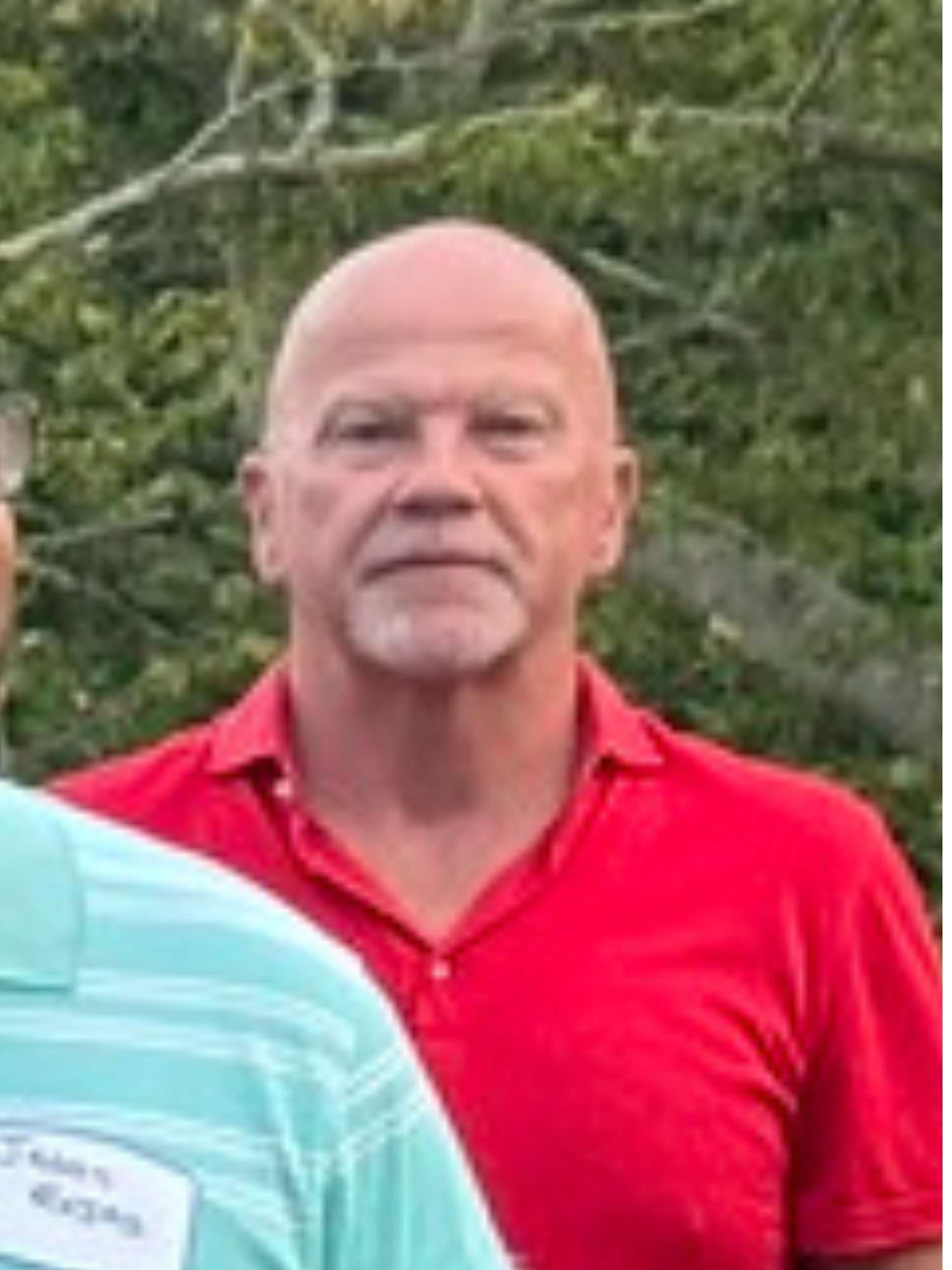
- Gresko in 2024

Member of the Connecticut House of Representatives from the 121st district
- Incumbent
- Assumed office February 3, 2016
- Preceded by: Terry Backer

Personal details
- Born: June 11, 1964 (age 62)
- Party: Democratic
- Education: Central Connecticut State University (BA)

Joe Gresko (born June 11, 1964) is an American Democratic Party politician currently serving as a member of the Connecticut House of Representatives from the 121st district, which includes part of Stratford, since 2016. Gresko was first elected in a 2016 special election to replace former representative Terry Backer after previously being the spokesman for Bridgeport mayor Joe Ganim. Gresko was re-elected in 2018 over Republican Robert Mitchell. And again in 2020, over Republican Ed Scinto. Gresko currently serves as a member of the House Energy and Technology Committee, and co-chair of the Environment Committee.

== Political positions ==
In 2025, Gresko introduced legislation to legalize commercial rabbit slaughter in Connecticut. The legislation was criticized by animal rights and welfare activists who argued that slaughtering rabbits is inhumane.
