= Christina Ayala =

American politician

Member of the Connecticut House of Representatives from the 128th district
- In office January 9, 2013 – January 7, 2015
- Preceded by: Andres Ayala Jr.
- Succeeded by: Christopher Rosario

Personal details
- Born: January 4, 1983 (age 43) Bridgeport, Connecticut, U.S.
- Party: Democratic

Christina Ayala (born January 4, 1983) is an American politician who served in the Connecticut House of Representatives from the 128th district from 2013 to 2015.

On September 26, 2014, she was arrested on multiple charges of voter fraud. On September 25, 2015, she was sentenced to a one-year suspended prison term.
