= Soundkeeper =

The term Soundkeeper. was first used in the American lexicon by the Long Island Soundkeeper Fund, Inc. in 1987 upon the founding of an environmental protection organization dedicated to the preservation and protection of Long Island Sound. The name and the organization's principles were modeled after the Hudson Riverkeeper Fund. Later, both organizations independently changed their official names to Riverkeeper and Soundkeeper. Soundkeeper and Riverkeeper are founding members of the Waterkeeper Alliance. The term Soundkeeper is a registered trademark of Soundkeeper, Inc. However, it has also become common practice to refer to the lead person who is the water presence of the organization as the "Soundkeeper".

Soundkeeper Inc. was originally located in Norwalk, Connecticut, and was incorporated in 1987 as a not-for-profit environmental organization. Its program area extends from the Battery Park in New York City up the East River, including portions of Queens County and Kings County New York, as well as all of Long Island Sound and its rivers and the watershed in New York and Connecticut.

Soundkeeper stated its mission as the protection and enhancement of the biological, physical, and chemical integrity of Long Island Sound and its watershed. To accomplish the organizations stated goals, Soundkeeper Inc. undertook activities in several program areas. In addition to the main program areas which include legal advocacy, monitoring and patrol of Long Island Sound and wetlands restoration, Soundkeeper operated five pump out vessels in western Long Island Sound to prevent sewage from being discharged overboard from vessel into the Sound. Soundkeeper pioneered new storm water pollution prevention by establishing a pilot program in Norwalk, CT. The "Filter Project" placed 254 storm drain filter inserts in catch basins designed to kill bacteria, and capture hydrocarbons and other pollutants.

After the passing of the original Soundkeeper in 2015, the Soundkeeper Board approached Save the Sound a regional environmental organization working in both CT and NY watersheds of the Long Island Sound.

The Soundkeeper organization formerly merged with Save the Sound in 2019 and continued the mission. The organization has a large network of pollution “watchdogs” a water quality team and lab as well as comprehensive legal and communication support.

== History ==
After years of repeated public health shellfishing harvest closures caused by malfunctioning municipally owned sewage treatment plants local fishermen in Norwalk, CT, sought a legal remedy to a problem that was causing great economic hardship. Terry Backer and Chris Staplefelt were referred by Bob Gaberilson a Nyack, New York Shad fisherman to then Riverkeeper John Cronin and Riverkeeper Attorney Robert F. Kennedy Jr., to help them become organized. Cronin and Kennedy helped guide the formation of the Connecticut Coastal Fishermen's Association and obtained legal representation for the group from the New York City law firm of Berel, Kass and Case. Shortly thereafter, Terry Backer, was elected president of the group and led the fishermen's group in filing several sixty-day notice letters of intention to sue several municipalities for violation of the federal Clean Water Act. These cities included; Stratford, Connecticut, Norwalk, Bridgeport and Milford Connecticut.

The Long Island Soundkeeper Fund Inc. was created through a stipulated settlement reached between the Connecticut Coastal Fishermen's Association and the city of Norwalk, Connecticut, in 1987 to settle a federal Clean Water Act lawsuit. The suit allege thousand of violations of the city's National Pollutant Discharge Elimination System Permit from their sewage treatment plant. The settlement with Norwalk, CT, was divided between several local environmental improvement projects and a payment of $86,500.00 to start a full-time watchdog for Long Island Sound. Using the settlement the Connecticut Coastal Fishermen's Association founded Soundkeeper, a full-time professional organization dedicated to the protection of Long Island Sound.

== Waterkeeper - a movement ==
There are currently 188 Waterkeeper organizations on six continents, Soundkeeper, was the second such group preceded by Riverkeeper. The Waterkeeper Alliance was founded in 1999. Since the inception of Soundkeeper, the "Waterkeeper" concept of protecting local environmental resources has grown rapidly based on the early models of Soundkeeper and Riverkeeper.
