= Nuevos =

Studio album by Orquesta El Arranque
- Released: 2008
- Recorded: 2007
- Genre: Tango
- Length: 56:54
- Label: Epsa Music
- Producer: Ignacio Varchausky

Orquesta El Arranque chronology
Maestros (2004)	Nuevos (2008)

Nuevos is Orquesta El Arranque's sixth album. Its sixteen tracks are a tribute to the new generation of tango composers. It forms a triptych with the two former albums, Clásicos, a collection of tango classics, and Maestros, which featured the compositions of the intermediate generation of tango composers.

There are two versions of the album: a plain one with an acrylic case and a lyrics booklet and a deluxe version with a board game that is a cross between Trivial Pursuit and snakes and ladders.

It received a nomination for the Premios Gardel in 2009.

== Track listing ==
No.	Title	Music	Length
1.	"Enigmático"	Camilo Ferrero
2.	"Nuevo y vivo"	Andrés Linetzky / Ignacio Varchausky
3.	"A pique"	Juan Quintero
4.	"Ni lo uno ni lo otro, todo lo contrario"	Martín Vázquez
5.	"Y permanece"	Ariel Rodríguez
6.	"Milonga de mis adioses"	Martín Vázquez
7.	"Nino"	Ramiro Boero
8.	"El balsamo"	Martín Vázquez
9.	"Sin lamentos"	Martín Vázquez
10.	"Celebración"	Ramiro Gallo
11.	"Candombinho"	Abel Rogantini / Fernando Lerman
12.	"Quinquela"	Ramiro Boero
13.	"Ida y vuelta"	Sonia Possetti
14.	"Mivalsonga"	Camilo Ferrero
15.	"El sur del sur"	Jorge Drexler
16.	"Insomnios"	Ariel Rodríguez

== Personnel ==
- Camilo Ferrero (First Bandoneon)
- Ramiro Boero (Second Bandoneon)
- Guillermo Rubino (First Violin)
- Osiris Rodríguez (Second Violin)
- Martín Vázquez (Electric Guitar)
- Ignacio Varchausky (Double Bass)
- Ariel Rodríguez (Piano)
- Noelia Moncada (voice)
