= Bedford Area School District =

School district in Pennsylvania

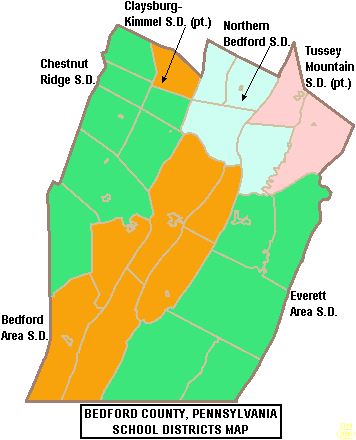

Address
- 330 E John Street Bedford, Bedford County, Pennsylvania, 15522; United States of America

Other information
- Website: https://www.bedfordasd.org/

The Bedford Area School District is a small, rural public school district located in southcentral Pennsylvania. It serves the Boroughs of Bedford, Hyndman, Manns Choice and Rainsburg and Bedford Township, Colerain Township, Cumberland Valley Township, Harrison Township, Londonderry Township and Snake Spring Township in Bedford County, Pennsylvania. Bedford Area School District encompasses approximately 292 square miles (760 km^{2}). According to 2000 federal census data, it served a resident population of 16,890. By 2010, the district's population declined to 16,819 people. The educational attainment levels for the Bedford Area School District population (25 years old and over) were 84% high school graduates and 14% college graduates. The district is one of the 500 public school districts of Pennsylvania.

According to the Pennsylvania Budget and Policy Center, 36% of the district's pupils lived at 185% or below the Federal Poverty Level as shown by their eligibility for the federal free or reduced price school meal programs in 2012. In 2009, Bedford Area School District residents’ per capita income was $17,309, while the median family income was $39,336. In the Commonwealth, the median family income was $49,501 and the United States median family income was $49,445, in 2010. In Bedford County, the median household income was $40,370. By 2013, the median household income in the United States rose to $52,100.

The district operates three schools: Bedford Elementary School, Bedford Middle School and Bedford High School. High school students may choose to attend Bedford County Technical Center for training in the construction and mechanical trades; culinary arts, agriculture fields and Cosmetology. The Appalachia Intermediate Unit IU8 provides the district with a wide variety of services like specialized education for disabled students and hearing, background checks for employees, state mandated recognizing and reporting child abuse training, speech and visual disability services and professional development for staff and faculty.
