= Bedford High School (Pennsylvania) =

Coordinates: 40.0157°N 78.4981°W

Location
- 330 East John Street; Bedford, Pennsylvania 15522; United States

Information
- Type: Public
- School district: Bedford Area School District
- NCES District ID: 4203180
- NCES School ID: 420318000726
- Principal: Kevin Steele
- Teaching staff: 40.18 (FTE)
- Grades: 9–12
- Enrollment: 527 (2023–2024)
- Student to teacher ratio: 13.12
- Colors: Royal blue and white
- Athletics conference: PIAA District V / Laurel Highlands Athletic Conference
- Team name: Bisons
- Newspaper: Bison Herald
- Communities served: Bedford, Hyndman, Manns Choice, Rainsburg
- Feeder schools: Bedford Area Middle School
- Website: www.bedfordasd.org/o/bhs

Bedford Senior High School is a small public high school located in Bedford, Pennsylvania. It is part of the Bedford Area School District.

== 2025 Renovations ==
For several years leading up to 2024, the BASD School Board had been working with the Bedford Borough for bidding to receive funding to do the project. In late 2024, the Board got a bid to fund the project. Starting on December 19, 2024, the project officially began. Due to the closure of the BHS Parking Lot, the bus routes changed where BHS Bus Drop off / pickup would take place directly in front of the school on John Street. The school-side parking on John St. was shut down to accommodate the buses. Timeline of events:

- December 19, Work begins with setting up all equipment
- February 3, removal of the stone wall along the parking lot
- February 10, begin work with HVAC.
- March 10, interior work inside the Gymnasiums & Locker Room. This also closed the student entrance there on John St.
- March 14, interior work on food service office areas and transportation department offices.
- March 17, removal of stone wall along Watson St.
- April 10, interior work on basement level classrooms. The classes hosted there are moved to other areas.

== Extracurriculars ==
The district offers a variety of clubs, activities and sports.

=== Athletics ===
Bedford High School is a member of the Pennsylvania Interscholastic Athletic Association (District V), and plays in the Laurel Highlands Athletic Conference.

- Baseball
- Basketball
- Cross country
- Football
- Golf
- Gymnastics
- Soccer
- Softball
- Tennis
- Track and field
- Volleyball
- Wrestling

== Notable alumni ==
- Lydia Cromwell Hearne (1874-1961), physician and civic leader
