= Lydia Cromwell Hearne =

American physician and civic leader

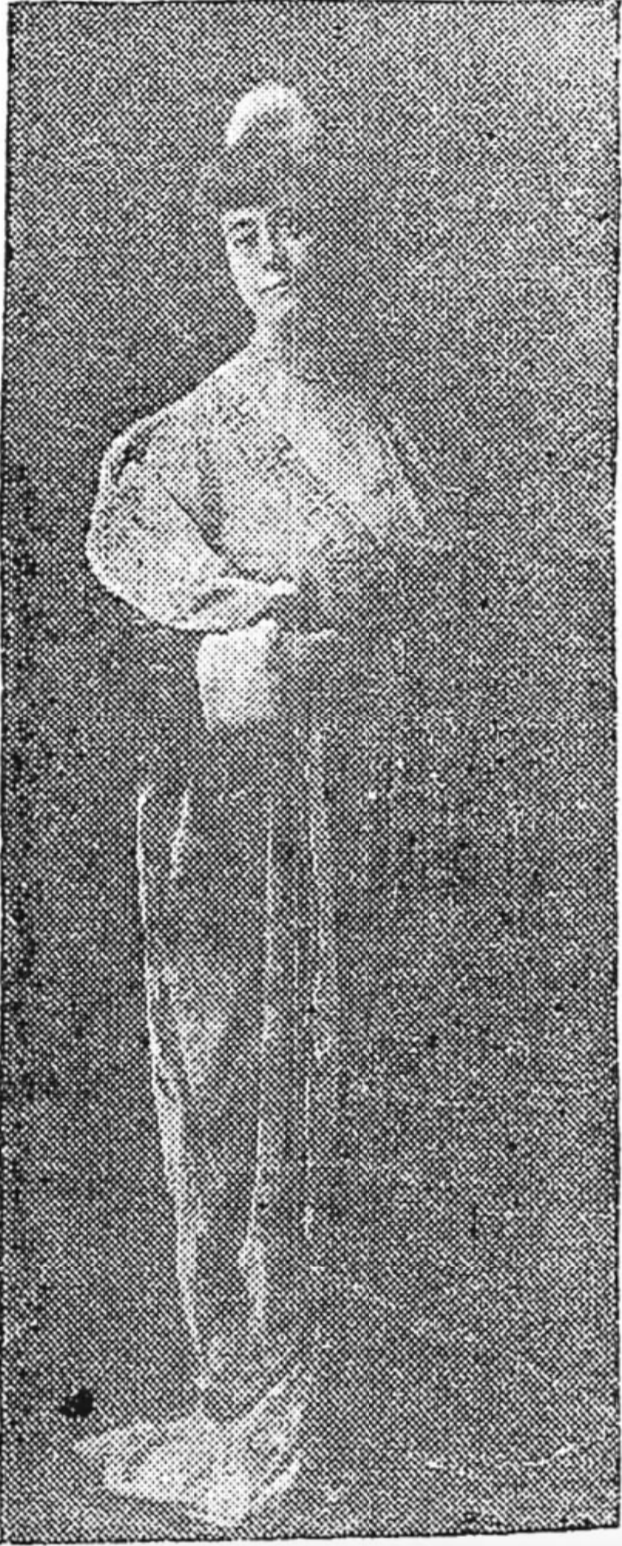
- Mrs. Julian G. Hearne (1916)
- Born: Lydia Herts Cromwell; 1874; Bedford, Pennsylvania, U.S.
- Died: 1961 (aged 86–87)
- Education: Hahnemann Medical College and Hospital
- Occupations: physician; civic leader
- Known for: Director, West Virginia Historical Society
- Spouse: Julian G. Hearne (m. 1900)
- Children: 1
- Medical career
- Institutions: Pennoyer Sanitarium; Galen Hall Sanatorium

Lydia Cromwell Hearne (also known after marriage as Mrs. Julian G. Hearne; 1874-1961) was an American physician and civic leader. She practiced medicine for several years and served as the director of the West Virginia Historical Society.

== Early life and education ==
Lydia Herts Cromwell was born in Bedford, Pennsylvania, in 1874. Her parents were William F. and Eliza (Bowles) Cromwell.

She graduated from the Bedford High School with high honors, May 5, 1893. She began the study of medicine with Dr. Amos A. Taylor as her preceptor. In October 1893, she entered the Hahnemann Medical College and Hospital, Chicago, Illinois, and was graduated as Medical Doctor in the regular course, March 26, 1896.

== Career ==
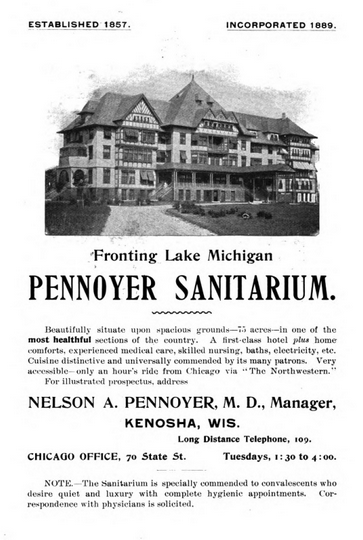
Pennoyer Sanitarium advertisement (1896)

Immediately upon graduating, in 1896-97, Cromwell was engaged as assistant physician with Dr. Nelson A. Pennoyer at the Pennoyer Sanatorium, Kenosha, Wisconsin. At this institution, in addition to the Sanatorium practice, Pennoyer and Cromwell had the care of an active practice in the town of Kenosha. At the beginning of the spring season of 1897, Cromwell accepted the position as Resident Physician at Galen Hall Sanatorium, Atlantic City, New Jersey, where she remained in the practice of medicine from 1898 to 1900.

Hearne served as Secretary of the Atlantic City Homeopathic Medical Club. She served on the Board of the Associated Charities and Anti-Tuberculosis League at Wheeling, the Salvation Army, and was a member of the Advisory Board during the planning and installation of the city water filtration system in Wheeling. During World War I, she served as a member of the Ohio County War Chest, and as chair of the War Work Council of the YWCA. She WAS president and a member of the board of the Children's Home of Woodsdale, WAs first vice president and chair of the finance committee of the Wheeling YWCA, was a member of the Board of Directors and was president in 1912-14 and 1918-20 of the Wheeling Woman's Club, and was first vice president of the General Federation of Women's Clubs of West Virginia.

She was an active leader among the Republican women of the state. She was elector-at-large on the Republican ticket in 1924 and was the first woman honored with the duty of carrying the electoral vote of her state to Washington, D.C. She was chair of Republican Women of the First Congressional District. She was appointed by Governor Ephraim F. Morgan to serve on the advisory board of the educational survey. Governor Howard Mason Gore appointed her a director of the West Virginia Historical Society. In November 1922, she was elected Republican member of the Board of Education of the Triadelphia District for a four year term, being the first woman member of that board.

== Personal life ==
On June 6, 1900, she married Julian G. Hearne, of Wheeling, West Virginia. She had one son, Julian G. Hearne Jr. Their home in Wheeling was named "Hearnlee".

Hearne took an active part in St. Matthews Episcopal Church at Wheeling.
