= Gran Orquesta TangoVia Buenos Aires =

Gran Orquesta TangoVia Buenos Aires is an orchestra made up by many of the most prominent musicians of the new generation of tango. Created by the non-profit organization TangoVia Buenos Aires in 2003, the orchestra's main goal is to celebrate the art of tango by means of special productions to recover forgotten repertoires or perform the works of new composers. The orchestra's first record, by the same name, published by Epsa Music, appeared in 2003, under the direction and arrangements of Nicolás Ledesma, Ramiro Gallo, Carlos Corrales and Andrés Linetzky. That same year - following an introductory concert at the Tango Festival in Buenos Aires, Argentina - the orchestra took part in the second edition of the Festival Buenos Aires Tango in Paris, performing a series of concerts in the Théâtre National de Chaillot. On that occasion the orchestra was directed by Cristian Zárate, the maestros Víctor Lavallén, Julio Pane, Emilio Balcarce, with invited singers Rubén Juárez and Guillermo Fernández.

== César Salgán and the Gran Orquesta TangoVia Buenos Aires ==
Pianist César Salgán son of the legendary Horacio Salgán, follows in his father's footsteps. As the director of Gran Orquesta TangoVia Buenos Aires he remastered, by means of a series of concerts in the National Library of Argentina, a tour of Italy and live recordings, some material of extraordinary musical value: the original arrangements of Don Horacio's famous tango orchestra of the 1940s and 50s. Moreover, these performances also premiered previously unpublished works and arrangements by Horacio Salgán, music that had not seen the light for fifty years or more. In September 2008 César Salgán and the orchestra took part in the second edition of the Buenos Aires Tango Festival in Rome, Italy, performing a series of concerts at the Auditorium Parco della Musica.

Part of the orchestra's repertoire as performed at the auditorium of the National Library in Buenos Aires is included in the record "Raras partituras 4: Horacio Salgán", published by Epsa Music within the framework of an initiative in collaboration with TangoVia Buenos Aires and the National Library of Argentina.

These concerts were part of a project that included the recovery of Horacio Salgán's archive and the digitalization of part of his catalogue of scores and arrangements. Many of these works have been published in the book "Arreglos para orquesta típica: Tradición e innovación en manuscritos originales" (Arrangements for a Typical Tango Orchestra: Tradition and Innovation in Original Manuscripts), co-published by TangoVia Buenos Aires and the National Library of Argentina.
