= Lidija Pozaić Frketić =

- Born: September 23, 1974 (age 51)
- Known for: One of 12 elected volunteer members of the World Scout Committee

Lidija Pozaić Frketić of Croatia (born 23 September 1974) is one of 12 elected volunteer members of the World Scout Committee, the main executive body of the World Organization of the Scout Movement, in charge of international relations.

She has addressed the European Parliament and the World Bank. She completed an MS in Chemical Technology Engineering at the University of Zagreb, an MBA at Erasmus University Rotterdam, and is completing PhD studies in analytical chemistry at the Cambridge Education Centre. She is a pharmaceutical quality control manager.

She joined Scouting in 1983, served at local level as Patrol leader and Group Leader from 1988 to 1992, and as a Member of the National Council from 1992 to 1995. She served as International Commissioner of the Scout Association of Croatia from 1995 to 2001. From 2004 to 2007 she was Chair of the European Scout Committee. She is a member of the Association of Top Achiever Scouts (ATAS), having completed the highest Croatian rank. She says “It is challenging being a girl in the world; we need to dare to be involved. I feel that it is important to develop as a person, a team player as well as a leader. Scouting offers you those valuable opportunities to grow. I would encourage girls to join Scouting - to make full use of the opportunities, to step up and do your best!”

She is married and speaks Croatian, English, Spanish, and French. She was an Elected Consultant of Croatian Government for the Civil Society 2010-2013, and a Member of the Council for the Development of Civil Society.

== Publications ==
- 2010Feb A LC-MS-MS method for determination of low doxazosin concentrations in plasma after oral administration to dogs. J Chromatogr Sci 2010 Feb;48(2):114-9 Marijana Erceg, Mario Cindric, Lidija Pozaic Frketic, Maria Vertzoni, Biserka Cetina-Cizmek, Christos Reppas
