= Lidiya Osiyuk =

- Лидия Осиюк
- Born: Lidiya Ivanovna Osiyuk; 6 March 1920; Barysy, Tamašoŭski sieĺsaviet, Socialist Soviet Republic of Lithuania and Belorussia
- Died: 27 December 1984 (aged 64)
- Occupation: Milkmaid
- Years active: 1930s–1975
- Children: Galina Skakun
- Awards: Hero of Socialist Labour; Order of Lenin

Lidiya Ivanovna Osiyuk (Belarusian: Лідзія Іванаўна Асіюк; Russian: Лидия Ивановна Осиюк; 6 March 1920 – 27 December 1984) was a Belarusian milkmaid who worked on the A. A. Zhdanov collective farm. She was a deputy of the Supreme Soviet of the Byelorussian Soviet Socialist Republic and of the Soviet of Nationalities of the Supreme Soviet of the Soviet Union. Osiyuk was awarded the title of Hero of Socialist Labour and was presented with the Order of Lenin three times.

== Early life ==
Osiyuk was born in the village of Barysy, Tamašoŭski sieĺsaviet, Brest County, Socialist Soviet Republic of Lithuania and Belorussia (under Polish control) on 6 March 1920. She came from a poor peasant family and received basic education at a local Polish-language school. Osiyuk was raised by her mother Pelageya.

== Career ==
When she was a teenager, Osiyuk worked on the fields alongside adults and was taught to milk cows and took on hard labour she could find to earn some money. She began working on the Volnaya Pratsa collective farm in Barysy and was a delegate to the Exhibition of Achievements of National Economy (VDNKh) in mid-1941. Osiyuk survived the occupation of Belarus by Nazi Germany as the Nazi regime exterminated almost all the livestock in Borisy, and many houses and buildings were destroyed during the fighting until the region was liberated in July 1944. In the late 1940s, she was one of the first people to work on the A. A. Zhdanov collective farm in the small nearby village of Lashnevo until it moved to Barsy in 1951.

At first, Osiyuk was part of a vegetable-growing team before becoming a milkmaid and did the work by hand since the farm lacked machinery, electricity and suitable storage buildings for the cattle. She was given three cows to tend to and milk yields were low because of severe food shortages; Osiyuk and other milkmaids began planting pumpkins, squash, cabbage, and potatoes to feed the animals and vegetables from her own garden and vegetable patch were also given to the collective farm. She tidied the stalls in which the cows were kept and tended and monitored the cattle. The milkmaids agreed to establish unified schedule: in the summer, they would arrive to work at 4:00 a.m. They would be given two rest breaks, from 9:00 a.m. to 1:00 p.m. and from 5:00 p.m. to 8:00 p.m. They also began working together to formulate feed rations and attend zootechnical courses.

By 1951, Osiyuk was able to extract 1,850 kg (4,080 lb) of milk from each of the 14 cows assigned to her, increasing to 4,619 kg (10,183 lb) in 1955 from the 12 cows in her group, 7,659 kg (16,885 lb) in 1966, 7,929 kg (17,480 lb) in 1967 and set her personal record of 8,001 kg (17,639 lb) in 1973. She helped multiple people with housing, medicine, and lumber. Osiyuk helped in the arrangement of the villagers for admittance to the Kremlin hospital and helped the villagers get their own hospital. She constantly helped the Zhdanov collective farm buy new equipment and building materials. Her efforts led the village, one of the first in the Brest region, to receive a telephone line and have paved roads built. Osiyuk retired in 1975.

She also had a life in public service. Osiyuk was a member of the Electoral Commission of the Byelorussian SSR for elections to the Soviet of Nationalities of the fifth convocation of the Supreme Soviet of the Soviet Union from 1954 to 1958 and of the Central Electoral Commission for elections to the fourth convocation of the Supreme Soviet of the Byelorussian Soviet Socialist Republic from 1955 to 1959. She was a deputy of the fourth, fifth and sixth convocations of the Supreme Soviet of the Byelorussian Soviet Socialist Republic from 1955 to 1967 (being a Presidium member in the sixth) and a deputy of the seventh and eighth convocations of the Soviet of Nationalities of the Supreme Soviet of the Soviet Union from 1966 to 1974. Osiyuk was a delegate to the Third All-Union Congress of Collective Farmers in 1969 and a deputy of the Brest Regional, Brest District and Domachevo Village Councils of Workers' Deputies.

== Personal life ==
She was married and had a daughter Galina Skakun, who also became a milkmaid. Osiyuk died on 27 December 1984.

== Awards and legacy ==
She was awarded the title of Hero of Socialist Labour and the Order of Lenin and the "Hammer and Sickle" gold medal on 18 January 1958. Osiyuk received the Honorary Certificate of the Presidium of the Supreme Soviet of the BSSR on 12 January 1960 and two more Orders of Lenin on 22 March 1966 and 8 April 1971. She won 12 VDNKh medals, including five gold medals. A memorial plaque was installed on Osiyuk's house in Barysy.
