= Lydia Martinez =

American politician

Member of the Connecticut House of Representatives from the 128th district
- In office 2001–2007
- Preceded by: Edna Garcia
- Succeeded by: Andres Ayala Jr.

Personal details
- Born: 1945 or 1946 Puerto Rico
- Party: Democratic

Lydia N. Martinez (born 1945 or 1946) is an American politician who served in the Connecticut House of Representatives from 2001 to 2007, representing the 128th district as a Democrat.
