= Ignacio Varchausky =

- Born: July 26, 1976 (age 49)
- Origin: Buenos Aires, Argentina
- Genres: Tango
- Occupations: Musician, writer, entrepreneur, executive producer
- Years active: 1996–present
- Label: Epsa Music
- Website: www.tangovia.org

Ignacio Varchausky (Buenos Aires, Argentina) is a double bass player, music producer and the founder of Orquesta El Arranque (1996). He is also the creator and artistic director of Orquesta Escuela de Tango Emilio Balcarce.

Varchausky is the founder of TangoVia Buenos Aires, a non-profit organization, which aims at preserving, spreading and developing tango culture throughout the world.

== Orquesta El Arranque ==
With this group Varchausky has recorded six albums and has performed as a double bass player in over 150 cities throughout the US, Europe, Japan and China. His most significant shows include the cycle at the Lincoln Center in New York with Wynton Marsalis and the Lincoln Center Jazz Orchestra, the concert at the Carré Theatre in Amsterdam, at Orchard Hall in Tokyo, at Grieg Hall in Bergen, Norway and at the Kennedy Center in Washington, D.C., and the series of concerts at the 2007 Hong Kong Arts Festival.

== Orquesta Escuela de Tango Emilio Balcarce ==
The documentary "Si sos brujo: A Tango Story", which sees Ignacio Varchausky as the lead character together with maestro Emilio Balcarce, records the birth of this orchestra-school for young tango musicians in Buenos Aires. Following Balcarce's retirement, the Orquesta Escuela is directed by maestro Néstor Marconi.

== Music production ==
Varchausky has produced over twenty albums with artists such as Leopoldo Federico, Gustavo Beytelmann, Julio Pane, Néstor Marconi, Bibi Ferreira, Lidia Borda and Vale Tango.

== Special productions ==
- Creation and artistic production of the Gran Orquesta TangoVia Buenos Aires, formed by the most important tango musicians of the new generation (2003)
- "Tango en Vivo" concert cycle, in collaboration with radio "2x4" 92.7 FM in Buenos Aires. Over 100 tango concerts were performed, each of which was recorded in digital multitrack and broadcast to a weekly audience of over 300,000 listeners. The cycle was subsequently published as a boxed set of 5 CDs produced by EPSA Music.
- Production of the documentary "Si sos brujo: A Tango Story" (2005) by Caroline Neal, TangoVia Buenos Aires.
- Tango Week, December 2004, at the Coliseo Theatre in Buenos Aires, with the participation of musicians Gustavo Beytelmann, Quinteto Ventarrón, Nicolás Ledesma, Orquesta El Arranque with Julio Pane, Mauricio Marcelli, Néstor Marconi, Raúl Garello among others.
- Latin Tinge, Orquesta El Arranque + LCJO with Wynton Marsalis, May 2001 (local and artistic production).
- Buenos Aires Tango Festival in Paris, Théâtre national de Chaillot, 2001, 2003, 2006, 2008.
- Buenos Aires Tango Festival in Rome, Auditorium Parco della Musica, 2006, 2008.
- Tango Festival in Genoa and Lille, European Culture Capitals of the year 2004.
- Musical production of the show "Efecto Tango", Lyon, 2005.
- Madero Tango, artistic direction, 2004–2006.

== Record productions ==
- Cabulero, Orquesta El Arranque, Epsa Music (2001)
- Clásicos, Orquesta El Arranque, Epsa Music (2002)
- En Vivo, Orquesta El Arranque, Epsa Music (2003)
- Maestros, Orquesta El Arranque, Epsa Music (2004)
- Nuevos, Orquesta El Arranque, Epsa Music (2008)
- Tal vez será su voz, Lidia Borda, distributed by Epsa Music (2002)
- De contra punto, Orquesta Escuela de Tango, Epsa Music (2001)
- Bien compadre, Orquesta Escuela de Tango, Epsa Music (2004)
- Gran Orquesta TangoVia Buenos Aires, Gran Orquesta TangoVia Buenos Aires, Epsa Music (2003)
- Tango en Vivo, AA.VV, boxed set of 5 CDs, Epsa Music (2003)
- Sigamos!, Gustavo Beytelmann, Epsa Music (2004)
- Bardi, Vale Tango, Epsa Music (2005)
- Tango, Bibi Ferreira y Miguel Proeça, Biscoito Fino (Brazil, 2006)
- Cada vez que me recuerdes, Sayaca Ohsawa, Epsa Music (Japan, 2007)
- Instantáneas, Julio Pane, Epsa Music, Colección TangoVia Buenos Aires (2007)
- Tiempo esperado, Néstor Marconi, Epsa Music, Colección TangoVia Buenos Aires (2008)
- Mi fueye querido, Leopoldo Federico, Epsa Music, Colección TangoVia Buenos Aires (2008) – Winner of the 2009 Latin Grammy Award
- Tren, Diego Schissi doble cuarteto, Epsa Music (2008)
- Tangos cantados, Tangos instrumentales, Tangos bailables, boxed set of 3 CDs published with the Italian weekly L'Espresso, production and artistic direction (Italy, 2008)
- A tiempo, Noelia Moncada, Epsa Music (2008)

== Awards and prizes ==
- 2009 Latin Grammy Award for Best Tango Album with My Fueye Querido, Leopoldo Federico
- "Francisco Canaro" Prize awarded by da SADAIC, 2007, Tango revelation of the last decade, Orquesta El Arranque
- Diploma of Merit, Konex, 2005, Best tango group of the last decade, Orquesta El Arranque
- Gardel Prize for the best album by a tango orchestra, 2004, "En Vivo", Orquesta El Arranque
- Latin Grammy Nomination for Best Tango Album 2004, "En Vivo", Orquesta El Arranque
- Award by SADAIC for the spreading of Argentinian music through the world, Gran Orquesta TangoVia Buenos Aires, 2003
- Award by the Head of the Government of the City of Buenos Aires, Tango Festival 2003
- Member of the jury of the Clarín Prize and of the Gardel Prize since 2003
- 4 Nominations to the Gardel Prize – Cabulero (2001), Clásicos (2002), Tal ves será su voz (2003), Maestros (2005)
- Clarín Prize, Revelation of the year, El Arranque, 1998
- Honorary Godfather of the sixth Tango Festival in Buenos Aires
- International delegate at the 2003 and 2004 Arts Midwest Conference, invited by the Ohio Arts Council
