= Connecticut's 121st House of Representatives district =

American legislative district

Connecticut's 121st State House of Representatives district
Representative
Joe Gresko; D

Connecticut's 121st House of Representatives district elects one member of the Connecticut House of Representatives. It encompasses parts of Stratford and has been represented by Democrat Joe Gresko since 2016.

== List of representatives ==
List of representatives from Connecticut's 121st State House district
Representative	Party	Years	District home	Note
Clarence I. Platt	Republican	1967–1973	Milford	Seat created
Marilyn Pearson	Republican	1973–1975	Stratford	
Lawrence E. Palaia	Democratic	1975–1977	Stratford	
Robert F. Frankel	Democratic	1977–1993	Stratford	
Terry Backer	Democratic	1993–2015	Stratford	Died in office
Joe Gresko	Democratic	2016–present	Stratford	Elected in special election

== Recent elections ==
=== 2020 ===
2020 Connecticut State House of Representatives election, District 121
Party	Candidate	Votes	%
Democratic	Joseph P. Gresko (incumbent)	7,303	69.30
Republican	Edward J. Scinto	3,235	30.70
Total votes		10,538	100.00
Democratic hold			

=== 2018 ===
2018 Connecticut House of Representatives election, District 121
Party	Candidate	Votes	%
Democratic	Joe Gresko (Incumbent)	5,376	70.3
Republican	Robert Mitchell	2,274	29.7
Total votes		7,650	100.00
Democratic hold			

=== 2016 ===
2016 Connecticut House of Representatives election, District 121
Party	Candidate	Votes	%
Democratic	Joe Gresko (Incumbent)	7,010	100.00
Total votes		7,010	100.00
Democratic hold			

=== 2014 ===
2014 Connecticut House of Representatives election, District 121
Party	Candidate	Votes	%
Democratic	Terry Backer (Incumbent)	3,893	71.5
Republican	Richard Fredete	1,552	28.5
Total votes		5,445	100.00
Democratic hold			

=== 2012 ===
2012 Connecticut House of Representatives election, District 121
Party	Candidate	Votes	%
Democratic	Terry Backer (Incumbent)	5,919	72.6
Republican	Joe Crudo	2,231	27.4
Total votes		8,150	100.00
Democratic hold			
