= Lidia Borda =

Argentine tango singer

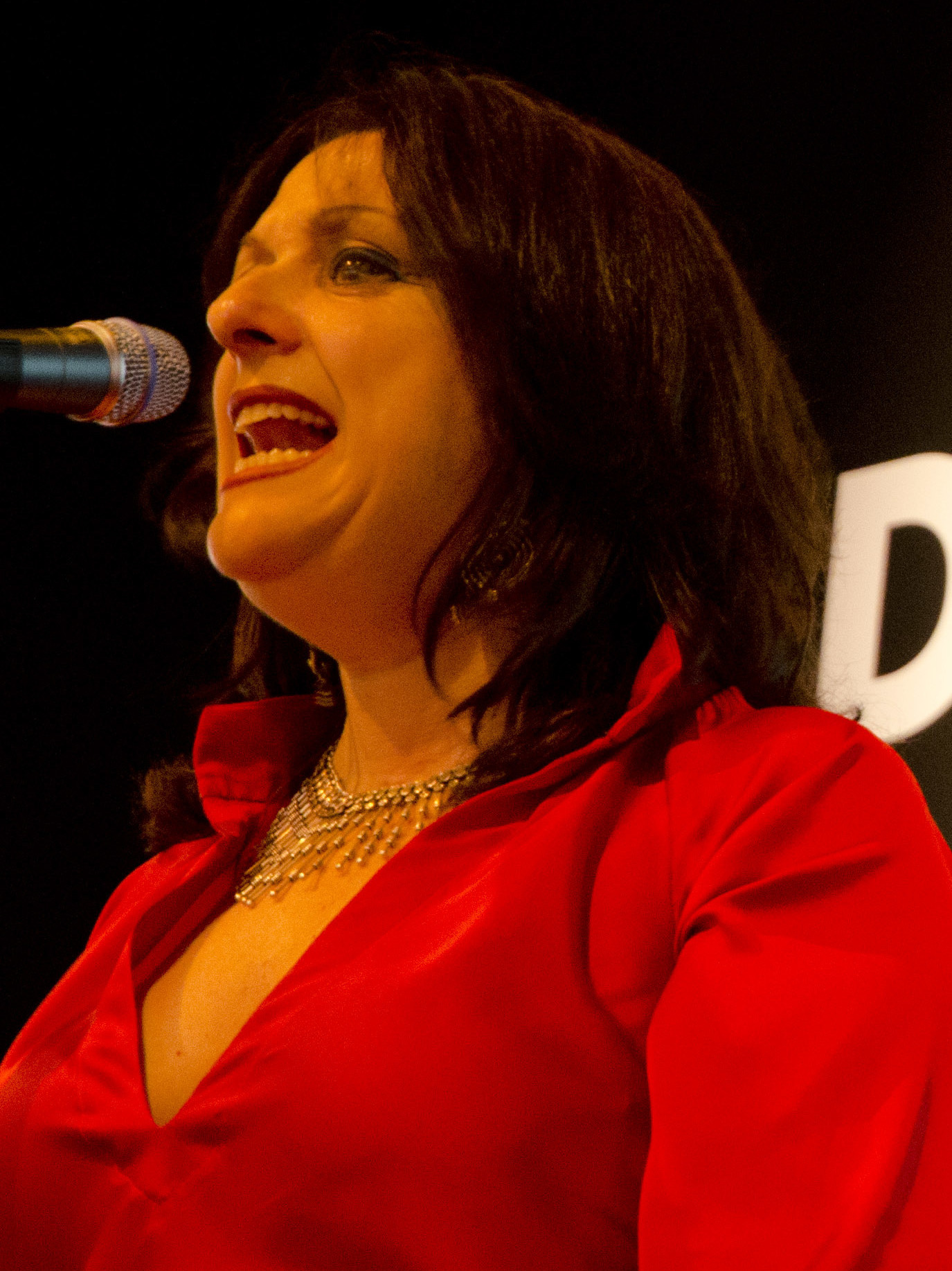

Lidia Borda (born 1966) is an Argentine tango singer who has been regarded as the best female voice in the last decades, and has been widely acclaimed. Lidia has been inspired by the pioneer interpreters of tango. She is a modern and original interpreter with a classic and unconventional repertoire that rescues beautiful pages of the genre, inexplicably forgotten.

== Life ==
Born in Buenos Aires, Lidia Borda studied Fine Art, Music and Theatre. Though she had been singing since her adolescence, it was in 1995 that she decided to dedicate herself entirely to singing tango, (those times with her brother -tango guitar player- Luis Borda who actually lives in Germany).

Borda has toured internationally in America and Europe and played at many of the main festivals around the world, including Grec, Spain; Festival de Otoño, Portugal; Citè de la musique, Chaillot, France; and The Bergen Festival, Norway. In 2002, she represented Argentina singing in the representation of LatinAmerica at the opening ceremony of the New Library of Alexandria in Egypt. In 2005 she was awarded the Konex prize “Merit Diploma” in the category of Female Tango Singer.

== Discography ==
- Un ramito de Cedrón [2008]
- Tal vez será su voz (with Orquesta El Arranque)
- Entre sueños
- Será una noche (with La Segunda)
- Patio de tango (with Brián Chambouleyron - Esteban Morgado)
- Hecho
