= Edward Johnson =

Edward, Eddie or Ed Johnson may refer to:

== Politicians ==
- Edward Johnson (colonial officer) (1598–1672), colonial military officer and writer
- Edward Johnson (mayor) (1767–1829), mayor of Baltimore
- Edward A. Johnson (1860–1944), first African American elected to New York state legislature
- Edward Johnson (British politician) (1834–1895), Member of Parliament for Exeter, 1880–1885
- Eddie Bernice Johnson (1934–2023), American politician
- B. Ed Johnson (1914–1983), American businessman, broadcaster and politician from Georgia

== Cultural figures ==
- Ed Johnson (broadcaster) (G. Edwin Johnson, died 2001), farm broadcaster from Delaware, Ohio, founder of Agri Broadcasting Network
- Edward Johnson (tenor) (1878–1959), Canadian tenor and manager of the Metropolitan Opera
- Edward Johnson (composer) (1572–1601), English composer
- Teddy Johnson (1920–2018), English entertainer, see Pearl Carr & Teddy Johnson
- Eddie Johnson (musician) (1920–2010), American jazz musician
- Edward Johnson (actor), British actor
- Edward Killingworth Johnson (1825–1896), British wood-engraver, illustrator, and watercolour painter
- Eduard Johnson (1840-1903), German historian and author of popular books on speaking Latin and Ancient Greek

== Sports figures ==
- Ed Johnson (American football) (born 1983), American football player
- Ed Johnson (baseball) (1899–1975), American Major League outfielder
- Ed Johnson (basketball) (1944–2016), American basketball center
- Eddie Johnson (American soccer) (born 1984), American soccer player
- Eddie Johnson (racing driver) (1919–1974), American racecar driver
- Eddie Johnson (English footballer) (born 1984), English footballer
- Edward Johnson (footballer, born 1859) (1859–1901), English footballer
- Eddie Johnston (born 1935), Canadian ice hockey player
- Eddie Johnson (linebacker) (1959–2003), American football player
- Eddie Johnson (punter) (born 1981), American football player
- Eddie Johnson (basketball, born 1959), American basketball small forward
- Eddie Johnson (basketball, born 1955) (1955–2020), American basketball guard
- Eddie Johnson (boxer) (1927–1986), American Olympic boxer

== Others ==
- Edward Albert Johnson (1885–1949), member of the Early Birds of Aviation
- Edward Johnson (general) (1816–1873), U.S. Army officer and later Confederate general
- Edward Hibberd Johnson (1846–1917), inventor and business associate of American inventor Thomas Edison
- Edward Mead Johnson (1852–1934), co-founder of Johnson and Johnson and Mead Johnson
- Edward Earl Johnson (1960–1987), American murderer
- Edward Daniel Johnson (1816–1889), London watch and chronometer maker
- Edward A. Johnson (ecologist), Canadian plant ecologist
- Ed Johnson (1882–1906), American lynch-mob victim, see Lynching of Ed Johnson
- Ed L. Johnson, American martial artist and Isshin-Ryu karate instructor
- Edward Johnson III (1930–2022), American investor and businessman
- Edward Johnson (lawyer) Canadian civil servant
- Edward C. Johnson II (1898–1984), American businessman
- Eddie T. Johnson (born 1959), Superintendent of Chicago Police Department 2016–2019
- J. Edward Johnson (1890–1976), lawyer, historian and early leader in the Church of Jesus Christ of Latter-day Saints
- Edward Samuel Spencer Johnson (born 1993), British entrepreneur and writer

== In fiction ==
- Coffin Ed Johnson, a protagonist in Chester Himes's Harlem Detective novels
- Cousin Eddie Johnson, a redneck character in the National Lampoon's Vacation film series, played in each case by Randy Quaid

== See also ==
- Ted Johnson (disambiguation)
- Edward Johnston (disambiguation)
- Edwin Johnson (disambiguation)
- Edmund Johnson (1883–1955), Australian footballer
