= Edward Johnston (disambiguation) =

Edward Johnston (1872–1944) was a British scholar credited with the revival of calligraphy.

Edward Johnston may also refer to:

- Edward Johnston (artist), American artist and designer
- Edward Johnston (politician) or Bertie Johnston (1880–1942), Western Australian MLA and Australian Senator
- Edward Johnston (orientalist) (1885–1942), Sanskrit scholar and Oxford professor
- Edward Johnston (Medal of Honor) (1844–1920), American Indian Wars soldier and Medal of Honor recipient
- Edward E. Johnston (1918–2011), American administrator and businessman
- Edward Johnston (priest), Dean of Waikato
- Edward Harvey-Johnston (1912–1971), English cricketer
- Eddie Johnston (born 1935), hockey player
- Edward F. Johnston (1854–1924), Scottish football executive, referee and co-founder of Spanish club Sevilla FC

== See also ==
- Edward Johnstone (disambiguation)
- Edward Johnson (disambiguation)
