= West of Zanzibar =

West of Zanzibar may refer to:

- West of Zanzibar (1928 film), an American silent film starring Lon Chaney
- West of Zanzibar (1954 film), a British adventure film featuring Anthony Steel
- "West of Zanzibar", a 1954 song by Anthony Steel
