= Jacqueline Batteast =

American basketball player (born 1983)

Personal information
- Born: March 26, 1983 (age 43) South Bend, Indiana, U.S.
- Listed height: 6 ft 2 in (1.88 m)

Career information
- High school: Washington (South Bend, Indiana)
- College: Notre Dame (2001–2005)
- WNBA draft: 2005: 2nd round, 17th overall pick
- Drafted by: Minnesota Lynx
- Position: Forward

Career history
- 2005: Minnesota Lynx
- 2006: Detroit Shock

Career highlights
- WNBA champion (2006); Kodak All-American (2005); Third-team All-American – AP (2005); 2× First-team All-Big East (2004, 2005); Big East Player of the Year (2005); USBWA National Freshman of the Year (2002); Big East Rookie of the Year (2002); Big East All-Freshman Team (2002)
- Stats at Basketball Reference

Jacqueline Batteast (born March 26, 1983) is an American former professional basketball player from South Bend, Indiana, who last played in the Women's National Basketball Association (WNBA) for the Detroit Shock.

Batteast attended the University of Notre Dame, where she became the school's 4th all-time leading scorer with 1,874 career points. She started a school record 97 consecutive games prior to graduating in 2005.

Following her collegiate career, she was selected 17th overall in the 2005 WNBA draft by the Minnesota Lynx. On April 5, 2006, Batteast was dealt to Detroit for Ambrosia Anderson.

Batteast played one season for Detroit, averaging 1.4 points and 1.0 rebounds in 26 games as Detroit won the 2006 WNBA championship. On May 18, 2007, she was waived by Detroit.

Batteast is now an assistant coach for the Washington High School Lady Panthers, where she graduated, in South Bend and is an assistant manager at Enterprise Rent A Car in Elkhart, IN

== Notre Dame statistics ==
Legend
GP	Games played	GS	Games started	MPG	Minutes per game
FG%	Field goal percentage	3P%	3-point field goal percentage	FT%	Free throw percentage
RPG	Rebounds per game	APG	Assists per game	SPG	Steals per game
BPG	Blocks per game	PPG	Points per game	**Bold**	Career high

Year	Team	GP	Points	FG%	3P%	FT%	RPG	APG	SPG	BPG	PPG
2001-02	Notre Dame	26	358	40.4	33.3	67.0	7.8	2.0	1.3	1.4	13.8
2002-03	Notre Dame	32	445	38.8	19.6	67.2	8.3	2.5	**2.0**	**1.6**	13.9
2003-04	Notre Dame	32	512	**45.2**	**34.5**	62.7	**8.6**	2.3	1.5	1.2	16.0
2004-05	Notre Dame	**33**	**559**	41.2	34.0	**78.4**	6.6	**2.6**	1.2	1.3	**16.9**
Career	Notre Dame	123	1874	41.5	30.5	69.3	7.8	2.4	1.5	1.4	15.2

== WNBA career statistics ==
Legend
GP	Games played	GS	Games started	MPG	Minutes per game	RPG	Rebounds per game
APG	Assists per game	SPG	Steals per game	BPG	Blocks per game	PPG	Points per game
TO	Turnovers per game	FG%	Field-goal percentage	3P%	3-point field-goal percentage	FT%	Free-throw percentage
**Bold**	Career best	°	League leader

†	Denotes seasons in which Batteast won a WNBA championship

=== Regular season ===
Year	Team	GP	GS	MPG	FG%	3P%	FT%	RPG	APG	SPG	BPG	TO	PPG	
2005	Minnesota	8	0	5.8	.000	.000	.000	0.6	**0.4**	0.0	**0.1**	0.4	0.0	
2006^{†}	Detroit	**26**	**1**	**6.7**	**.278**	**.143**	**.571**	**1.0**	0.3	**0.1**	**0.1**	0.2	**1.4**	
Career	2 years, 2 teams	34	1	6.5	.250	.143	.267	.571	0.9	0.3	0.1	0.1	0.2	1.1

=== Playoffs ===
Year	Team	GP	GS	MPG	FG%	3P%	FT%	RPG	APG	SPG	BPG	TO	PPG
2006^{†}	Detroit	4	0	2.3	.000	.000	.000	0.0	0.3	0.0	0.0	0.0	0.0
Career	1 year, 1 team	4	0	2.3	.000	.000	.000	0.0	0.3	0.0	0.0	0.0	0.0
