= NBA All-Star Weekend Shooting Stars Competition =

Timed basketball contest (2004–2015, 2026–present)

Shooting Stars
- Sport: Basketball
- Competition: National Basketball Association
- Discipline: Shooting
- Sponsored by: Kia

History
- First award: Los Angeles Lakers, 2004 (Derek Fisher, Lisa Leslie, and Magic Johnson)
- Most wins: As a team (3 times): Team Bosh (Chris Bosh, Swin Cash, and Dominique Wilkins); As an individual (4 times): Swin Cash
- Most recent: Team Knicks, 2026 (Jalen Brunson, Karl-Anthony Towns, and Allan Houston)
- Website: State Farm 3-Point Contest

The Shooting Stars competition is a National Basketball Association (NBA) contest during All-Star Weekend held on the Saturday before the All-Star Game. The contest was held from 2004 to 2015 before returning in 2026. The contest originally involved teams consisting of two active NBA or WNBA players and a retired NBA player competing together in a shooting competition. In the contest's return in 2026, the format was changed to feature teams consisting of two current NBA players and a retired NBA player competing together in a two-round shooting competition, in which each team must shoot from seven locations in order and each player must shoot from each location to score the most points.

== Format ==
=== Original format ===
The original format involved a current NBA player, a WNBA player, and a retired NBA player competing together in a shooting competition. From 2004 to 2012, players represented their teams' cities. Starting in 2013, the NBA player chose both a WNBA player and the retired player to compete on his team. The competition itself was time based, involving shooting from four locations of increasing difficulty and making all four shots in sequential order. The first shot was a 10-ft bank shot from the right angle, the second was straight-on jump shot from the top of the key, the third was an NBA three-point shot from the left angle and the fourth is a half-court shot. There was a two-minute time limit for each attempt and the top two teams advanced to the final round. The event was held each All-Star Weekend from 2004 to 2015 In 2007–08, Team San Antonio became the event's first two-time winner. Detroit followed suit in 2008–09 with their second title. In 2006, Team San Antonio set the course record with 25.1 seconds. In 2011, Team Atlanta became the first team to win the event with a time over one minute. From 2013 to 2015, Team Bosh became the first back-to-back and only three-time winner. Starting with the 2016 NBA All-Star Game, the contest was retired and removed from All Star Weekend until 2026.

=== Format change ===
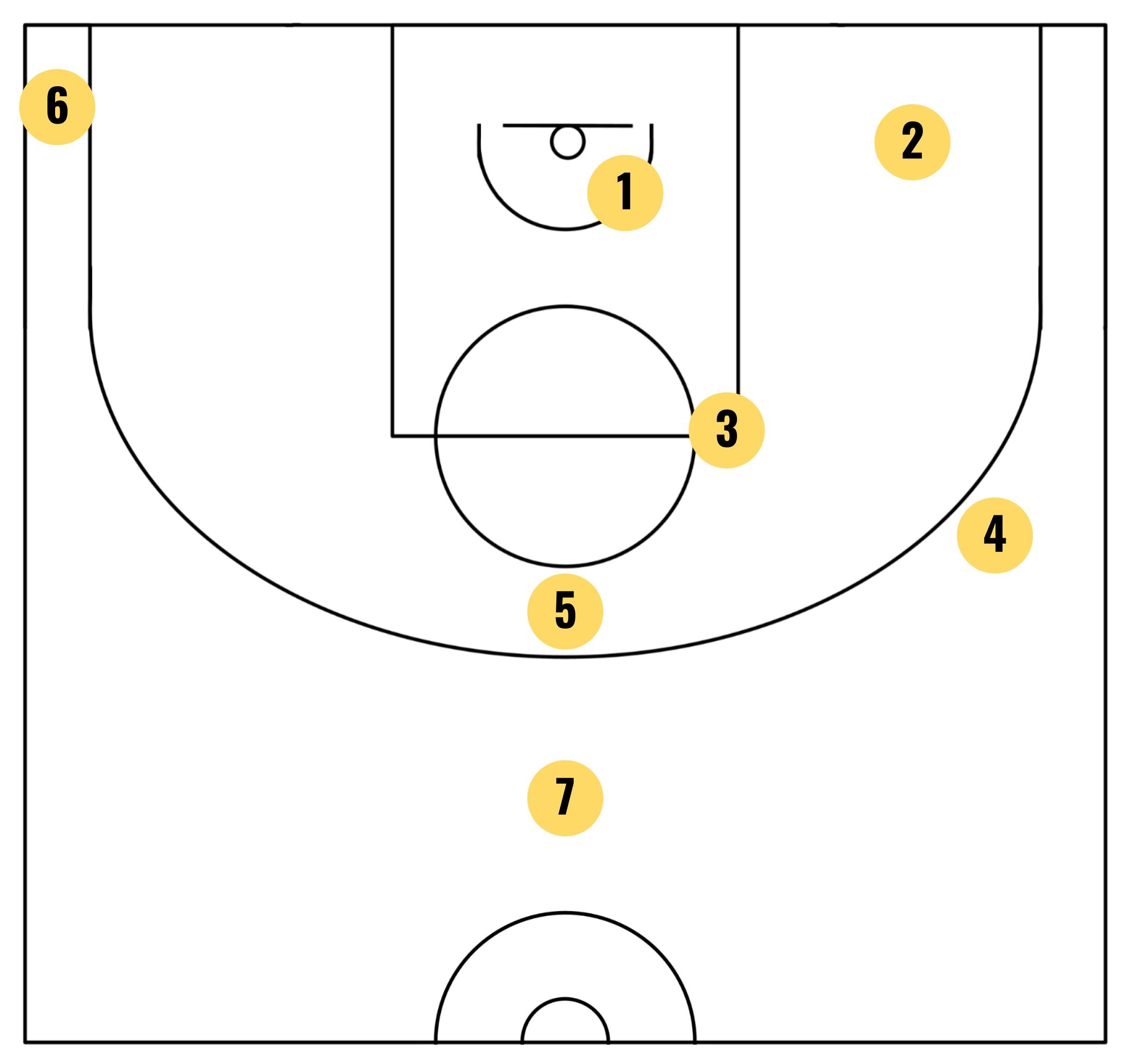
The seven Shooting Star locations

With the competition's return in 2026, a new format was announced. The new format maintains its two-round format, but the competition will consists of four teams consisting of two current NBA players and one NBA legend. Each have one minute and ten seconds to score points while rotating through seven designated shooting locations around the court, with all three players on a team shooting at each spot in a set order. The two teams with the most points in the first round will advance to the final round. The team with the most points in the final round will be crowned the winner.

The seven shooting locations:

1. Right lane layup/dunk (2 points)
2. 18' right baseline (2 points)
3. Right elbow (2 points)
4. Right wing 3-pointer (3 points)
5. Top of the key (2 points)
6. Left corner 3-pointer (3 points)
7. Long range 3-pointer (4 points)

== List of champions ==
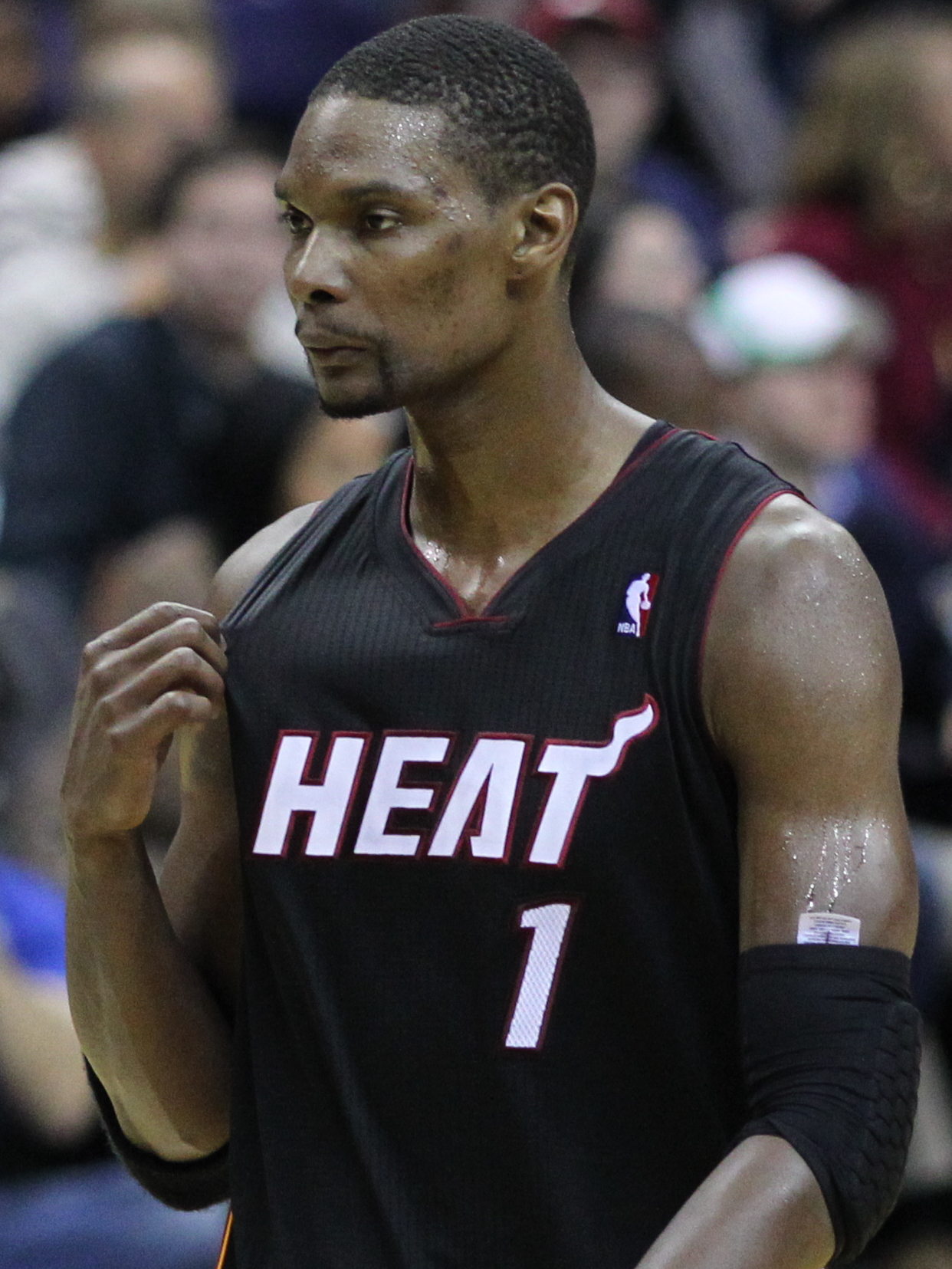
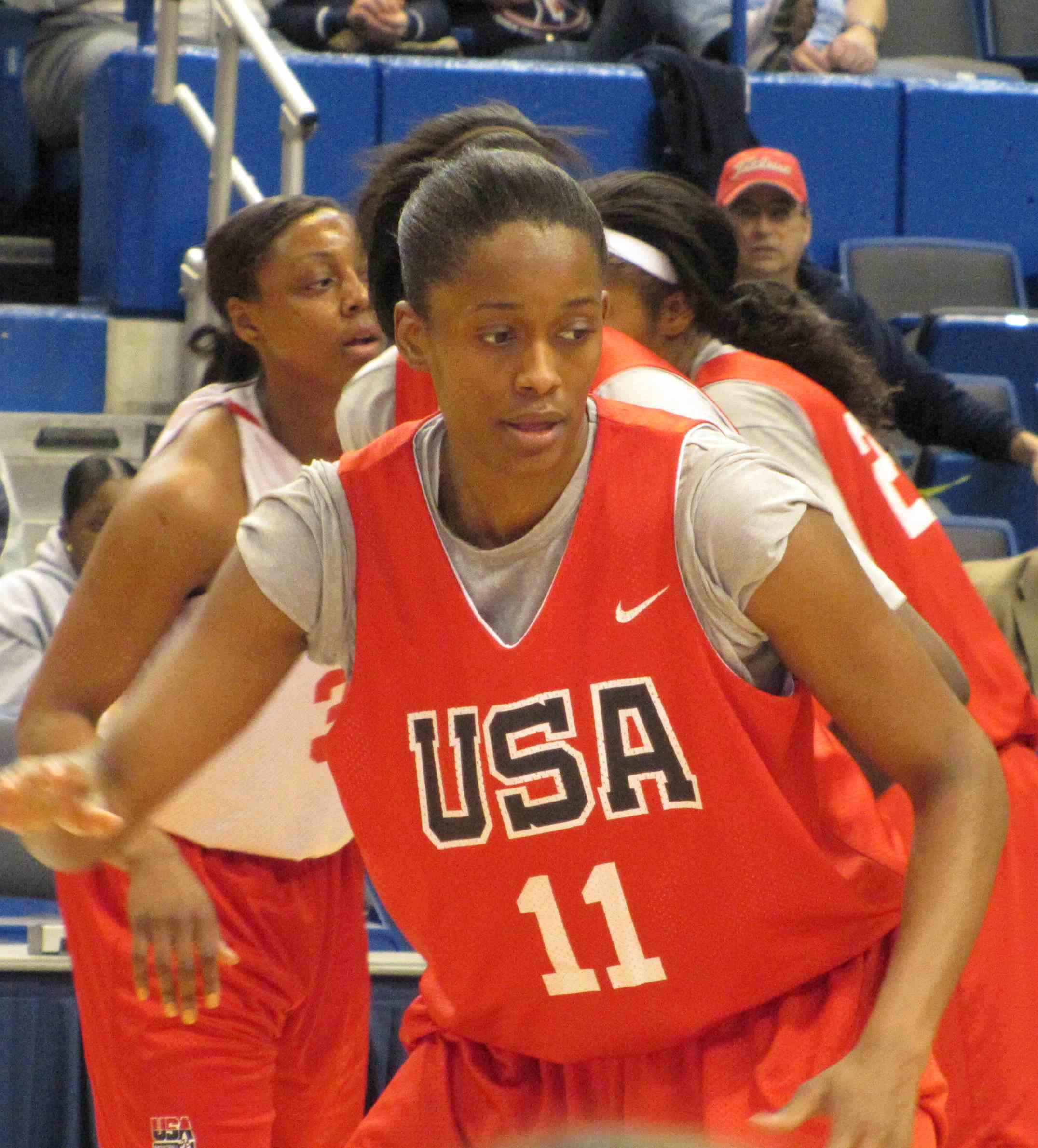
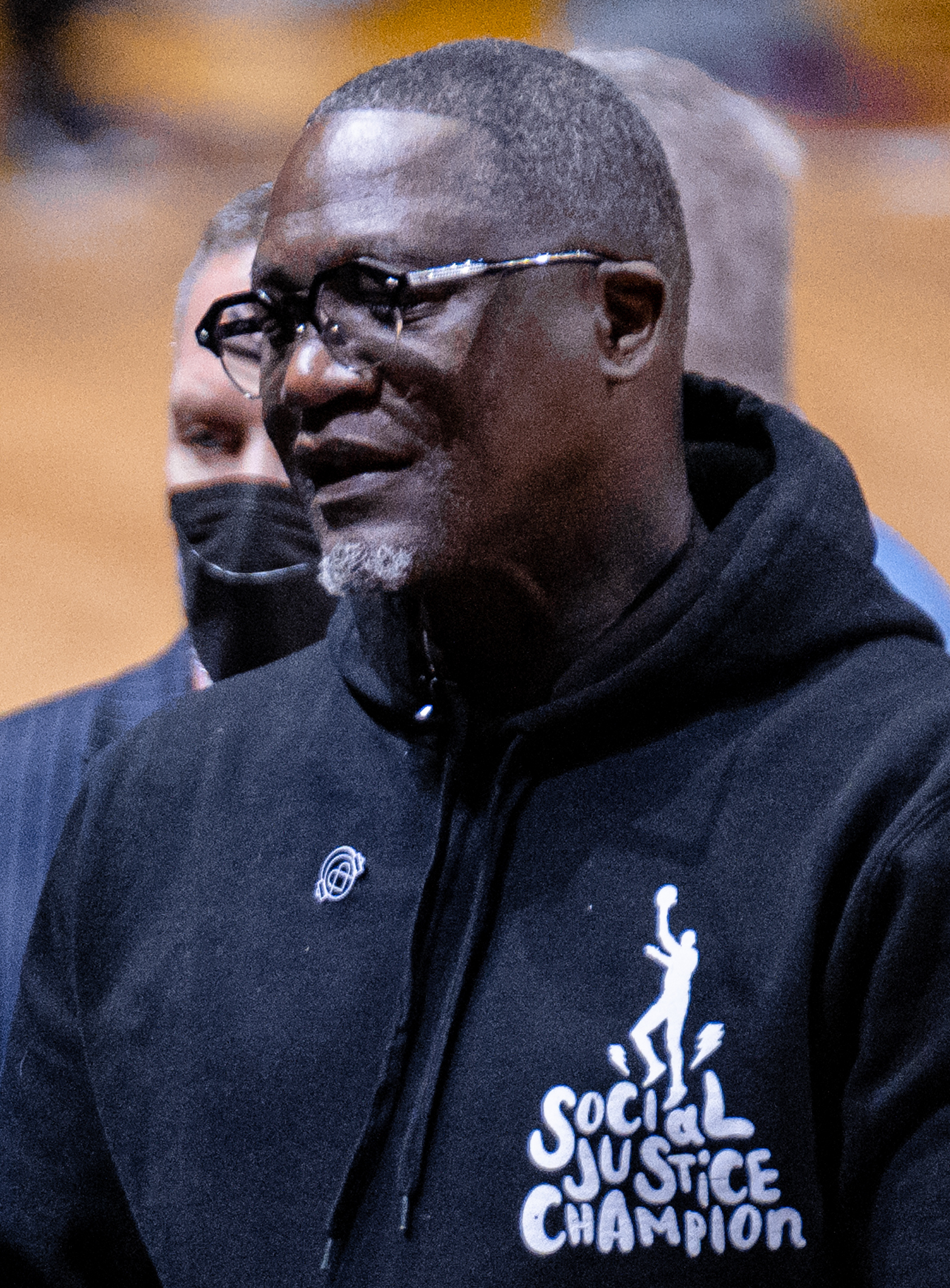
Team Bosh, consisting of Chris Bosh (left), Swin Cash (center), and Dominique Wilkins (right), won in three consecutive years from 2013 to 2015.

	Active NBA player
	Inducted into the Naismith Memorial Basketball Hall of Fame
Player (#)	Denotes the number of times the player has won
Team (#)	Denotes the number of times a player from this team has won

Year	Team	Players	Representing	First Round	Final Round
2004	Los Angeles Lakers	(United States) Derek Fisher	Los Angeles Lakers	—N/a	43.9 seconds
2004	Los Angeles Lakers	(United States) Lisa Leslie	Los Angeles Sparks	—N/a	43.9 seconds
2004	Los Angeles Lakers	(United States) Magic Johnson	Los Angeles Lakers (2)	—N/a	43.9 seconds
2005	(Arizona) Phoenix	(United States) Shawn Marion	Phoenix Suns	—N/a	28.0 seconds
2005	(Arizona) Phoenix	(United States) Diana Taurasi	Phoenix Mercury	—N/a	28.0 seconds
2005	(Arizona) Phoenix	(United States) Dan Majerle	Phoenix Suns (2)	—N/a	28.0 seconds
2006	San Antonio	(France) Tony Parker	San Antonio Spurs	—N/a	25.1 seconds
2006	San Antonio	(United States) Kendra Wecker	San Antonio Silver Stars	—N/a	25.1 seconds
2006	San Antonio	(United States) Steve Kerr	San Antonio Spurs (2)	—N/a	25.1 seconds
2007	(Michigan) Detroit	(United States) Chauncey Billups	Detroit Pistons	66.0 seconds	50.5 seconds
2007	(Michigan) Detroit	(United States) Swin Cash	Detroit Shock	66.0 seconds	50.5 seconds
2007	(Michigan) Detroit	(United States) Bill Laimbeer	Detroit Pistons (2)	66.0 seconds	50.5 seconds
2008	San Antonio (2)	(United States) Tim Duncan	San Antonio Spurs (3)	Unknown	35.8 seconds
2008	San Antonio (2)	(Russia) Becky Hammon	San Antonio Silver Stars (2)	Unknown	35.8 seconds
2008	San Antonio (2)	(United States) David Robinson	San Antonio Spurs (4)	Unknown	35.8 seconds
2009	(Michigan) Detroit (2)	(United States) Arron Afflalo	Detroit Pistons (3)	59.3 seconds	58.4 seconds
2009	(Michigan) Detroit (2)	(United States) Katie Smith	Detroit Shock (2)	59.3 seconds	58.4 seconds
2009	(Michigan) Detroit (2)	(United States) Bill Laimbeer (2)	Detroit Pistons (4)	59.3 seconds	58.4 seconds
2010	Texas	(Germany) Dirk Nowitzki	Dallas Mavericks	88.0 seconds	34.3 seconds
2010	Texas	(Russia) Becky Hammon (2)	San Antonio Silver Stars (3)	88.0 seconds	34.3 seconds
2010	Texas	(United States) Kenny Smith	Houston Rockets	88.0 seconds	34.3 seconds
2011	Atlanta	(Dominican Republic) Al Horford	Atlanta Hawks	47.6 seconds	70.0 seconds
2011	Atlanta	(United States) Coco Miller	Atlanta Dream	47.6 seconds	70.0 seconds
2011	Atlanta	(United States) Steve Smith	Atlanta Hawks (2)	47.6 seconds	70.0 seconds
2012	(New York City) New York	(United States) Landry Fields	New York Knicks	38.7 seconds	37.3 seconds
2012	(New York City) New York	(United States) Cappie Pondexter	New York Liberty	38.7 seconds	37.3 seconds
2012	(New York City) New York	(United States) Allan Houston	New York Knicks (2)	38.7 seconds	37.3 seconds
2013	Team Bosh	(United States) Chris Bosh	Miami Heat	50.0 seconds	89.0 seconds
2013	Team Bosh	(United States) Swin Cash (2)	Chicago Sky	50.0 seconds	89.0 seconds
2013	Team Bosh	(United States) Dominique Wilkins	—N/a	50.0 seconds	89.0 seconds
2014	Team Bosh (2)	(United States) Chris Bosh (2)	Miami Heat (2)	35.6 seconds	31.4 seconds
2014	Team Bosh (2)	(United States) Swin Cash (3)	Chicago Sky (2)	35.6 seconds	31.4 seconds
2014	Team Bosh (2)	(United States) Dominique Wilkins (2)	—N/a	35.6 seconds	31.4 seconds
2015	Team Bosh (3)	(United States) Chris Bosh (3)	Miami Heat (3)	30.8 seconds	57.6 seconds
2015	Team Bosh (3)	(United States) Swin Cash (4)	New York Liberty (2)	30.8 seconds	57.6 seconds
2015	Team Bosh (3)	(United States) Dominique Wilkins (3)	Atlanta Hawks (3)	30.8 seconds	57.6 seconds
2026	Team Knicks	(United States) Jalen Brunson	New York Knicks (3)	31 points	47 points
2026	Team Knicks	(Dominican Republic) Karl-Anthony Towns	New York Knicks (4)	31 points	47 points
2026	Team Knicks	(United States) Allan Houston	—N/a	31 points	47 points

== List of participants ==
Year	Teams											
2004	Detroit Pistons			Los Angeles Clippers			Los Angeles Lakers			San Antonio Spurs		
2004	Chauncey Billups	Cheryl Ford	John Salley	Marko Jarić	Nikki Teasley	Terry Cummings	Derek Fisher	Lisa Leslie	Magic Johnson	Manu Ginobili	Jennifer Azzi	Steve Kerr
2005	Denver			(Michigan) Detroit			Los Angeles			(Arizona) Phoenix		
2005	Andre Miller	Becky Hammon	Alex English	Ronald Dupree	Swin Cash	Adrian Dantley	Luke Walton	Lisa Leslie (2)	Magic Johnson (2)	Shawn Marion	Diana Taurasi	Dan Majerle
2006	Houston			Los Angeles (2)			(Arizona) Phoenix (2)			San Antonio		
2006	Tracy McGrady	Sheryl Swoopes	Clyde Drexler	Kobe Bryant	Lisa Leslie (3)	Magic Johnson (3)	Shawn Marion (2)	Kelly Miller	Dan Majerle (2)	Tony Parker	Kendra Wecker	Steve Kerr (2)
2007	Chicago			(Michigan) Detroit (2)			Los Angeles (3)			San Antonio (2)		
2007	Ben Gordon	Candice Dupree	Scottie Pippen	Chauncey Billups (2)	Swin Cash (2)	Bill Laimbeer	Smush Parker	Temeka Johnson	Michael Cooper	Tony Parker (2)	Kendra Wecker	George Gervin
2008	Chicago (2)			(Michigan) Detroit (3)			(Arizona) Phoenix (3)			San Antonio (3)		
2008	Chris Duhon	Candice Dupree	B. J. Armstrong	Chauncey Billups (3)	Swin Cash (3)	Bill Laimbeer (2)	Amar'e Stoudemire	Cappie Pondexter	Eddie Johnson	Tim Duncan	Becky Hammon (2)	David Robinson
2009	(Michigan) Detroit (4)			Los Angeles (4)			(Arizona) Phoenix (4)			San Antonio (4)		
2009	Arron Afflalo	Katie Smith	Bill Laimbeer (3)	Derek Fisher (2)	Lisa Leslie (4)	Michael Cooper (2)	Leandro Barbosa	Tangela Smith	Dan Majerle (3)	Tim Duncan (2)	Becky Hammon (3)	David Robinson (2)
2010	Atlanta			Los Angeles (5)			Sacramento			Texas		
2010	Joe Johnson	Angel McCoughtry	Steve Smith	Pau Gasol	Marie Ferdinand-Harris	Brent Barry	Tyreke Evans	Nicole Powell	Chris Webber	Dirk Nowitzki	Becky Hammon (4)	Kenny Smith
2011	Atlanta (2)			Chicago (3)			Los Angeles (6)			Texas (2)		
2011	Al Horford	Coco Miller	Steve Smith (2)	Taj Gibson	Catherine Kraayeveld	Steve Kerr (3)	Pau Gasol (2)	Tina Thompson	Rick Fox	Dirk Nowitzki (2)	Roneeka Hodges	Kenny Smith (2)
2012	Atlanta (3)			(New York City) New York			(Orlando, Florida) Orlando			Texas (3)		
2012	Jerry Stackhouse	Lindsey Harding	Steve Smith (3)	Landry Fields	Cappie Pondexter (2)	Allan Houston	Jameer Nelson	Marie Ferdinand-Harris	Dennis Scott	Chandler Parsons	Sophia Young	Kenny Smith (3)
2013	Team Bosh			Team Harden			Team Lopez			Team Westbrook		
2013	Chris Bosh	Swin Cash	Dominique Wilkins	James Harden	Tina Thompson	Sam Cassell	Brook Lopez	Tamika Catchings	Muggsy Bogues	Russell Westbrook	Maya Moore	Robert Horry
2014	Team Bosh			Team Curry			Team Durant			Team Hardaway		
2014	Chris Bosh (2)	Swin Cash (2)	Dominique Wilkins (2)	Stephen Curry	Becky Hammon (5)	Dell Curry	Kevin Durant	Skylar Diggins	Karl Malone	Tim Hardaway Jr.	Elena Delle Donne	Tim Hardaway Sr.
2015	Team Bosh			Team Curry (2)			Team Millsap			Team Westbrook (2)		
2015	Chris Bosh (3)	Swin Cash (3)	Dominique Wilkins (3)	Stephen Curry (2)	Sue Bird	Dell Curry (2)	Paul Millsap	Elena Delle Donne (2)	Scottie Pippen (2)	Russell Westbrook (2)	Tamika Catchings (2)	Penny Hardaway
2026	Team All-Star			Team Cameron			Team Harper			Team Knicks		
2026	Scottie Barnes	Chet Holmgren	Richard Hamilton	Kon Knueppel	Jalen Johnson	Corey Maggette	Dylan Harper	Ron Harper Jr.	Ron Harper Sr.	Jalen Brunson	Karl-Anthony Towns	Allan Houston (2)

=== Statistics ===
Rank	Team	APPS	1ST	2ND	3RD	4TH	PCT
1	Team Bosh	3	3	0	0	0	1.000
2	San Antonio	4	2	0	2	0	.500
3	(Michigan) Detroit	4	2	0	1	1	.500
4	Texas	3	1	2	0	0	.333
5	(Arizona) Phoenix	4	1	1	1	1	.250
6	Atlanta	3	1	0	1	1	.333
7	Los Angeles Lakers	1	1	0	0	0	1.000
7	(New York City) New York	1	1	0	0	0	1.000
9	Los Angeles	6	0	2	1	3	.000
10	Chicago	3	0	2	0	1	.000
11	Team Westbrook	2	0	2	0	0	.000
12	Denver	1	0	1	0	0	.000
12	San Antonio Spurs	1	0	1	0	0	.000
12	Team Durant	1	0	1	0	0	.000
15	Team Curry	2	0	0	2	0	.000
16	Houston	1	0	0	1	0	.000
16	Los Angeles Clippers	1	0	0	1	0	.000
16	(Orlando, Florida) Orlando	1	0	0	1	0	.000
16	Sacramento	1	0	0	1	0	.000
16	Team Harden	1	0	0	1	0	.000
21	Detroit Pistons	1	0	0	0	1	.000
21	Team Hardaway	1	0	0	0	1	.000
21	Team Lopez	1	0	0	0	1	.000
21	Team Millsap	1	0	0	0	1	.000
