= Angelina Williams =

American basketball player (born 1983)

Personal information
- Born: July 21, 1983 (age 43) Chicago, Illinois, U.S.
- Listed height: 6 ft 0 in (1.83 m)

Career information
- High school: George Washington (Chicago, Illinois)
- College: Illinois (2001–2005)
- WNBA draft: 2005: 2nd round, 18th overall pick
- Drafted by: Phoenix Mercury
- Position: Guard
- Number: 33

Career history
- 2005: Phoenix Mercury
- 2006: Detroit Shock

Career highlights
- WNBA champion (2006)
- Stats at Basketball Reference

Angelina Williams (born July 21, 1983) is an American former professional basketball player who played two seasons in the WNBA.

== College career ==
At University of Illinois (2001–05) she majored in sports management and was a member of the Dean's List. She became the first Fighting Illini to play a WNBA game and finished her career as the school's fourth all-time leading scorer.

== Career statistics ==
Legend
GP	Games played	GS	Games started	MPG	Minutes per game	RPG	Rebounds per game
APG	Assists per game	SPG	Steals per game	BPG	Blocks per game	PPG	Points per game
TO	Turnovers per game	FG%	Field-goal percentage	3P%	3-point field-goal percentage	FT%	Free-throw percentage
**Bold**	Career best	°	League leader

†	Denotes season(s) in which Williams won a WNBA championship

=== WNBA ===
==== Regular season ====
WNBA regular season statistics
Year	Team	GP	GS	MPG	FG%	3P%	FT%	RPG	APG	SPG	BPG	TO	PPG
2005	Phoenix	16	0	9.3	.300	.222	**.857**	1.4	**0.6**	**0.3**	**0.4**	**0.7**	**2.5**
2006 †	Detroit	**21**	0	6.2	**.326**	**.250**	.647	0.6	**0.6**	**0.3**	0.3	**0.7**	2.0
**Career**	2 years, 2 teams	37	0	7.5	.312	.231	.708	1.0	0.6	0.3	0.4	0.7	2.2

==== Playoffs ====
WNBA playoff statistics
Year	Team	GP	GS	MPG	FG%	3P%	FT%	RPG	APG	SPG	BPG	TO	PPG
2006 †	Detroit	6	0	4.2	.417	.000	—	0.7	0.0	0.3	0.2	0.3	1.7
**Career**	1 year, 1 team	6	0	4.2	.417	.000	—	0.7	0.0	0.3	0.2	0.3	1.7

=== College ===
NCAA statistics
Year	Team	GP	Points	FG%	3P%	FT%	RPG	APG	SPG	BPG	PPG
2001–02	Illinois	29	235	43.6	26.2	**78.0**	4.1	1.4	1.3	0.8	8.1
2002–03	Illinois	29	448	**45.5**	**34.7**	74.4	4.3	2.7	1.7	0.8	15.4
2003-04	Illinois	27	425	42.0	21.3	72.9	**5.2**	2.7	2.0	1.0	15.7
2004–05	Illinois	**30**	**533**	44.5	32.2	72.9	4.6	2.7	**2.1**	**1.2**	**17.8**
**Career**		115	1641	43.9	29.7	74.0	4.5	2.4	1.7	1.0	14.3

== Personal life ==
Williams is the daughter of Ricky and Darlene Harvest.
