= 2006 WNBA Finals =

Sports championship

Team	Coach	Wins
Detroit Shock	Bill Laimbeer	3
Sacramento Monarchs	John Whisenant	2
- Dates: August 30 – September 9
- MVP: Deanna Nolan (Detroit Shock)
- Hall of Famers: Shock: Swin Cash (2022); Katie Smith (2018); Monarchs: Yolanda Griffith (2021)
- Eastern finals: Detroit defeated Connecticut, 2–1
- Western finals: Sacramento defeated Los Angeles, 2–0

The 2006 WNBA Finals was the championship series of the 2006 WNBA season, and the conclusion of the season's playoffs. The Detroit Shock, second-seeded champions of the Eastern Conference, defeated the Sacramento Monarchs, second-seeded champions of the Western Conference, three games to two in a best-of-five series. This was Detroit's second title.

The Shock made their second appearance in the Finals in four years. The Monarchs appeared in the Finals for the second straight time after having won the title in 2005.

Going into the series, the Shock had won one championship, as had the Monarchs.

The Shock's 23–11 record gave them home court advantage over Sacramento (21–13), but a Mariah Carey concert meant that the fifth and deciding game had to be moved to Joe Louis Arena in downtown Detroit.

== Road to the finals ==
Sacramento Monarchs		Detroit Shock
21–13 (.618); 2nd West, 4th overall	Regular season	23–11 (.676); 2nd East, 3rd overall
Defeated the (3) Houston Comets, 2–0	Conference Semifinals	Defeated the (3) Indiana Fever, 2–0
Defeated the (1) Los Angeles Sparks, 2–0	Conference Finals	Defeated the (1) Connecticut Sun, 2–1

=== Regular season series ===
The Shock and the Monarchs split the regular season series:

July 26

Recap

Sacramento Monarchs 71, Detroit Shock 91

Palace of Auburn Hills, Auburn Hills

July 30

Recap

Detroit Shock 61, Sacramento Monarchs 94

ARCO Arena, Sacramento

== Game summaries ==
All times listed below are Eastern Daylight Time.

=== Game 1 ===
ESPN2

August 30
7:30pm

Recap

Sacramento Monarchs 95, Detroit Shock 71
Scoring by quarter: 26–20, 27–18, 17–14, 25–19
Pts: Lawson 22; Rebs: Brunson 7 Asts: Penicheiro 6 Stls: Haynie 5	Pts: Ford 25; Rebs: Ford 8 Asts: Nolan 5; 3P FG: Smith 4-6
Sacramento leads series, 1–0

Palace of Auburn Hills, Auburn Hills
Attendance: 9,581
Referees:
- #22 Corteau
- #38 Simpson
- #39 Price

Kara Lawson led a balanced attack with 22 points as the Monarchs posted an impressive 95-71 victory over the Detroit Shock in Game 1 of the WNBA Finals. Sacramento, which set a WNBA Finals record for points, field goals (35) and 3-pointers (ten), took the early edge in the best-of-five series.

Cheryl Ford scored 25 points and Katie Smith added 21 for Detroit, which is seeking its second title in four years. The Shock certainly will not get there committing a Finals-record 24 turnovers as they did in Game 1.

Sacramento officially took charge of the contest with an 8–0 run during the third quarter that turned a 13-point lead into a 61-40 bulge with 6:09 to play. Nicole Powell ignited the surge with a 3-pointer and Griffith made a pair of baskets before Ticha Penicheiro capped the run with a free throw.

The Shock got within 76–62 midway through the fourth quarter, but Lawson came off the bench to hit three 3-pointers as the Monarchs extended their cushion to 91–71 with 2:57 remaining. Lawson finished 6-of-8 from the arc, setting a Finals record for made 3-pointers. Powell connected on 4-of-7 attempts as Sacramento finished 10-of-19 from long range.

=== Game 2 ===
ESPN2

September 1
7:30 pm

Recap

Sacramento Monarchs 63, Detroit Shock 73
Scoring by quarter: 26–19, 16–14, 12–15, 9–25
Pts: Griffith 14; Rebs: Griffith 8 Asts: Haynie 3 FG: Lawson 3-11	Pts: Nolan 21; Rebs: Cash, Ford 8 Asts: Cash 5 FG: Smith 6-13
Series tied, 1–1

Palace of Auburn Hills, Auburn Hills
Attendance: 15,218
Referees:
- #4 Blauch
- #18 Walker
- #30 Mattingly

Deanna Nolan scored 21 points and Smith added 16 – all in the second half – as the Shock rebounded from a slow start to even the best-of-three series with a 73–63 victory in Game 2 of the WNBA Finals.

Swin Cash collected 11 points, eight rebounds and five assists for Detroit, which gave Sacramento (5–1) its first loss of the postseason and avoided falling into an 0–2 hole.

Trailing by nine at the half and 54–48 entering the final period, the Shock were on the verge of being one game away from a Finals' loss. However, after scoring the last three points of the third quarter, Detroit ran off the first eight points of the frame. A jumper by Nolan capped the spurt and gave the Shock the lead for good, 56–54, with 7:43 left.

After Detroit maintained the edge over the next five minutes, Katie Smith made it 67–58 on a 3-pointer with 2:57 to go.

=== Game 3 ===
ESPN2

September 3
4:30 pm

Recap at the Wayback Machine (archived February 12, 2007)

Detroit Shock 69, Sacramento Monarchs 89
Scoring by quarter: 18–20, 15–24, 17–28, 19–17
Pts: Nolan 22; Rebs: Ford 8 Asts: Cash, Ford, Holland-Corn, Smith 3 FG: Nolan 9–17	Pts: Griffith 15; Rebs: Powell 6 Asts: Walker 5 Stls: Lawson 3
Sacramento leads series, 2-1

ARCO Arena, Sacramento
Attendance: 14,253
Referees:
- #8 Humphrey
- #10 Trammell
- #11 Napier

Yolanda Griffith scored 15 points, and Nicole Powell added 14, as the Monarchs took control of the WNBA Finals with an 89–69 rout of the Detroit Shock in Game 3. Capturing its 11th consecutive home playoff victory, Sacramento improved its home record in the postseason to 12–2 (.857), the best mark in league history.

On the way to claiming their first title last season, the Monarchs stole home-court advantage from the Connecticut Sun and then captured both home games to complete the series in four games. So far, Sacramento employed a similar approach throughout the series. Following a 95–71 victory in Game 1 in Detroit, which set a Finals record for points, the Monarchs defeated the Shock again to move within one win of a second consecutive championship.

Despite failing to capitalize on a six-point lead entering the fourth quarter of Game 2 in a 73–63 loss, Sacramento came out fired up, using a 9–0 run at the start of the second quarter to pull ahead, 29–18, with 7:46 to play. Rookie Scholanda Dorrell sank a pair of three-pointers during the burst. Griffith, the MVP of last season's Finals, scored her team's final eight points before the half to maintain an 11-point edge at the break, 44–33.

=== Game 4 ===
ESPN2

September 6
9:00 pm

Recap at the Wayback Machine (archived February 18, 2007)

Detroit Shock 72, Sacramento Monarchs 52
Scoring by quarter: 22–26, 21–11, 13–13, 16–2
Pts: Smith 22; Rebs: Ford 10; Asts: Cash 5 O REB: Cash 5 (6 tot REB)	Pts: Powell 13; Rebs: Griffith 11; Asts: Griffith, Penicheiro 2 Blocks: Walker 3
Series tied, 2-2

ARCO Arena, Sacramento
Attendance: 14,213
Referees:
- #18 Walker
- #22 Corteau
- #39 Price

Katie Smith and Cheryl Ford carried the load to help the Detroit Shock extend the WNBA Finals to a decisive fifth game.

Smith scored 22 points and Ford added 13 with 10 rebounds as the Shock avoided elimination by posting a 72–52 triumph over the defending champion Sacramento Monarchs.

Rebounding from Sunday's 89–69 loss in Game 3, Detroit ended Sacramento's 11-game home playoff winning streak and will host the final game of the series on Saturday. Each of the previous league champions clinched the title on its home floor.

=== Game 5 ===
ESPN2

September 9
3:30 pm

Recap at the Wayback Machine (archived February 20, 2007)

Sacramento Monarchs 75, Detroit Shock 80
Scoring by quarter: 18–17, 26–19, 9–22, 22–22
Pts: Lawson 17; Rebs: Griffith 9 Asts: Haynie 5 FG: Lawson 7-10	Pts: Nolan 24; Rebs: Ford 10; Asts: Smith 6 Blks: Riley 4
Detroit wins WNBA Finals, 3-2

Joe Louis Arena, Detroit
Attendance: 19,671
Referees:
- #10 Bob Trammell
- #11 Tina Napier
- #30 Lisa Mattingly

Katie Smith scored 17 points, including two clutch jumpers in the final two minutes, as the Detroit Shock claimed their second title with a stirring 80–75 victory over the Sacramento Monarchs.

The Shock, who also won the title in 2003, won the last two games of the best-of-five series and dethroned the Monarchs, who were trying to become the league's third repeat champion. Instead, Detroit joined Houston (1997–2000) and Los Angeles (2001–02) as multiple championship winners.

Deanna Nolan scored 24 points and was named Finals MVP. Nolan scored 10 points in the pivotal third quarter, when the Shock held the Monarchs to nine points and took the lead for good.

A 3-pointer by Nolan gave Detroit a 68–55 lead before Sacramento made a final charge, closing to 75–69 on a 3-pointer by Kristin Haynie with 2:05 remaining. Smith answered with a 3-pointer 19 seconds later.

A three-point play by Haynie and 3-pointer by foul-plagued Nicole Powell pulled the Monarchs within 78–75 with 33 seconds to play. Sacramento elected not to foul but Smith foiled the strategy by draining a 15-footer with 14 seconds remaining.

Smith grabbed a last-gasp shot and hurled the ball skyward in celebration. She is the all-time leading scorer in women's professional basketball history and a former WNBA scoring champion, but she never had been on a championship team – until now.

== Awards ==
- 2006 WNBA champion: Detroit Shock
- Finals MVP: Deanna Nolan

== Rosters ==
2006 Detroit Shock Finals roster
Players
Coaches

Pos.	No.	Nat.	Name	Height	Weight	From
F	21	(United States)	Batteast, Jacqueline	6' 2" (1.88m)	175 lb (79kg)	Notre Dame
C	45	(United States)	Braxton, Kara	6' 6" (1.98m)	210 lb (95kg)	Georgia
F	32	(United States)	Cash, Swin	6' 1" (1.85m)	162 lb (73kg)	Connecticut
PF	35	(United States)	Ford, Cheryl	6' 3" (1.91m)	198 lb (90kg)	Louisiana Tech
G	11	(United States)	Holland-Corn, Kedra	5' 7" (1.7m)	136 lb (62kg)	Georgia
SG	14	(United States)	Nolan, Deanna	5' 11" (1.8m)	144 lb (65kg)	Georgia
SF	23	(United States)	Pierson, Plenette	6' 2" (1.88m)	181 lb (82kg)	Texas Tech
PG	5	(United States)	Powell, Elaine	5' 8" (1.73m)	150 lb (68kg)	LSU
C	00	(United States)	Riley, Ruth	6' 5" (1.96m)	195 lb (88kg)	Notre Dame
G/F	30	(United States)	Smith, Katie	5' 11" (1.8m)	174 lb (79kg)	Ohio State
F	33	(United States)	Williams, Angelina	6' 0" (1.83m)	150 lb (68kg)	Illinois

Head coach
(United States) Bill Laimbeer (Notre Dame)
Assistant coaches
(United States) Rick Mahorn (Hampton)
(United States) Cheryl Reeve (La Salle)
Athletic trainer
(United States) Mike Perkins

Legend

- (C) Team captain
- (DP) Unsigned draft pick
- (FA) Free agent
- (S) Suspended
- Injured

2006 Sacramento Monarchs Finals roster
Players
Coaches

Pos.	No.	Nat.	Name	Height	Weight	From
F	7	(United States)	Buescher, Erin	6' 3" (1.91m)	181 lb (82kg)	The Master's College
F	32	(United States)	Brunson, Rebekkah	6' 3" (1.91m)	175 lb (79kg)	Georgetown
C	33	(United States)	Griffith, Yolanda	6' 4" (1.93m)	175 lb (79kg)	Florida Atlantic
G	4	(United States)	Haynie, Kristin	5' 9" (1.75m)	147 lb (67kg)	Michigan State
G	20	(United States)	Lawson, Kara	5' 9" (1.75m)	165 lb (75kg)	Tennessee
F	9	(Mali)	Maiga-Ba, Hamchetou	6' 1" (1.85m)	160 lb (73kg)	Old Dominion
G	21	(Portugal)	Penicheiro, Ticha	5' 11" (1.8m)	149 lb (68kg)	Old Dominion
F	14	(United States)	Powell, Nicole	6' 3" (1.91m)	170 lb (77kg)	Stanford
G	5	(United States)	Robinson, Scholanda	5' 11" (1.8m)	155 lb (70kg)	LSU
F	8	(United States)	Smith, Kim	6' 0" (1.83m)	155 lb (70kg)	Utah
F	22	(United States)	Walker, DeMya	6' 3" (1.91m)	168 lb (76kg)	Virginia

Head coach
(United States) John Whisenant (New Mexico State)
Assistant coaches
(United States) Tom Abatemarco (Dowling College)
(United States) Steve Shuman (Sacramento State)
(United States) Monique Ambers (Arizona State)
Athletic trainer
(United States) Jill Jackson (Sacramento State)

Legend

- (C) Team captain
- (DP) Unsigned draft pick
- (FA) Free agent
- (S) Suspended
- Injured
