= Ted Johnson (disambiguation) =

Ted Johnson (born 1972) is a former American football player.

Ted Johnson may also refer to:

- Edward Johnson (lawyer), Canadian lawyer and civil servant
- Ted Johnson (bandleader) (1903–?), Swedish-American violinist and bandleader
- Ted Johnson (footballer, born 1901) (1901–1970), Australian rules footballer for South Melbourne
- Ted Johnson (footballer, born 1948), Australian rules footballer for Hawthorn
- Ted Johnson (politician) (1909–2002), Australian politician
- Ted Johnson (rower) (1924–1985), New Zealand representative rower
- Teddy Johnson (1919–2018), English entertainer, one half of the husband-and-wife duo Pearl Carr & Teddy Johnson

== See also ==
- Edward Johnson (disambiguation)
- Ted Johnstone, pseudonym of David McDaniel, science fiction writer
