= West of Zanzibar (1954 film) =

1954 film

- U.K. theatrical poster
- Directed by: Harry Watt
- Written by: Max Catto; Jack Whittingham
- Story by: Harry Watt
- Produced by: Leslie Norman
- Starring: Anthony Steel; Sheila Sim; Edric Connor
- Cinematography: Paul Beeson
- Edited by: Peter Bezencenet
- Music by: Alan Rawsthorne
- Production company: Ealing Studios
- Distributed by: General Film Distributors
- Release date: 24 March 1954
- Running time: 90 minutes
- Country: United Kingdom
- Language: English

West of Zanzibar is a 1954 British adventure film directed by Harry Watt and starring Anthony Steel, Sheila Sim and Edric Connor.

It is a sequel to Where No Vultures Fly (1951), from the same director and producer, and continues the adventures of game warden Bob Payton, played again by Anthony Steel. The subject of the film is ivory smuggling, and although the film appears to side with the African natives against economic exploitation, it was banned by the government of Kenya, which considered its approach too paternalistic.

== Plot ==
The rural African Galana tribe move to Mombasa following a drought. The tribe's peaceful ways are destroyed by the influence of illegal ivory traders. Game warden Bob Payton turns detective, travelling to Zanzibar to discover the ringleader behind the ivory smuggling. Payton tracks his quarry through some of the most treacherous passages of the Zanzibar territory. Despite obstacles which include crocodiles and rhinos, Payton finally corners the villain. The gang's ringleader has given an African tribe land in return for ivory tusks, but he is repaid for his scheming when the tribe turns on him.

== Cast ==
- Anthony Steel as Bob Payton
- Sheila Sim as Mary Payton
- Edric Connor as Ushington
- Orlando Martins as M'Kwongi
- William Simons as Tim Payton
- Martin Benson as Dhofar
- David Osieli as Ambrose
- Bethlehem Sketch as Bethlehem
- Peter Illing as Yhingoni
- Edward Johnson as Halfbreed
- Juma as Juma
- Howard Marion-Crawford as Wood
- Stuart Lindsell as Colonel Ryan
- Sheik Abdullah as Dhow captain
- Alan Webb as Senior official

== Production ==
Where No Vultures Fly had been one of the biggest hits at the British box office in 1951 so Ealing Studios decided to make a sequel with the same star, director and producer, and again in association with the Schlesinger Organisation. Dinah Sheridan was replaced by Sheila Sim. At one stage it was planned for the film to be shot in 3-D but this did not happen.

Like the first film, it was shot on location in Africa. The unit arrived in Nairobi in January 1953.

It was one of the few films Steel made at his peak where he was not in support of an older male actor.

== Soundtrack ==
A popular local dance song during the shoot was a Swahili folk song called "Jambo Sigara Baridl". The filmmakers liked the melody so much they decided to include it as background music. Then it was decided to prepare an English version of the song, with Anthony Steel singing lead vocals, along with the popular London-based quartet, The Radio Revellers, led by Arthur Reed, Freddie Holmes, Stan Emeney, and Alwyn Fernhead. When asked if he could sing, Steel replied, "Apart from making gurgling noises in the bath, I've never tried." Steel recorded the song anyway and it was a success on the charts.

== Release ==
Kenya's film censors banned the film on the grounds it would hurt race relations in the country.

The film was also banned in India after the protests of African students in that country.

== Reception ==
=== Box office ===
Universal distributed the film in the US. They opened it at the World Theatre in New York, which tended to show exploitation films – it was an experiment to have the film considered as an exploitation one as opposed to something arthouse, which was the traditional market for British movies in America. The experiment was not a success. The film still ended up taking $400,000 in the US with over 10,000 bookings.

In 1957, the film was listed as among the seventeen most popular movies the Rank Organisation ever released in the US.

=== Critical reception ===
Variety said "The yarn is developed as a strong adventure meller in which native customs and rivalries play an important part. There is a brief attempt to point a moral which, well-meaning though it may be, appears a little fatuous on the screen. "

Bosley Crowther wrote in The New York Times, "it is an exciting and generally creditable picture of a contemporary aspect of East Africa."

BFI Screenonline later wrote:

West of Zanzibar was designed to capitalise on its predecessor's success but the actual film, and its history with audiences, couldn't be more different. Harry Watt... managed to maintain the fun pace, beautiful cinematography and focus on wildlife that made the first film so popular, but West of Zanzibar has one key difference: its subject. It replaces the worthy concerns for animal welfare in Where No Vultures Fly with a more contentious humanitarian question – the displacement of rural African tribes and their participation in ivory poaching. But it completely fudges the answer... Watt was reportedly taken aback, but the Kenyan Board's decision made explicit the film's problematic depictions of racial politics. West of Zanzibar has since disappeared from public view, and remains one of the least known Ealing titles.

Sky Movies noted: "Anthony Steel once again as the game warden Bob Payton. He shares the Hollywood hero's ability to come through the most vicious fight with no more than a spotless handkerchief tied around one bulging bicep."

TV Guide wrote, "relying too much on its scenic African location, this British adventure moves along slowly."
