= Edwin Johnson =

Edwin Johnson may refer to:

- Edwin Johnson (Australian educator) (1835–1894), under-secretary of the Department of Education, New South Wales
- Edwin Johnson (historian) (1842–1901), English historian
- Kevin Johnson (athlete) (Edwin Luther Kevin Johnson, born 1950), Bahamian Olympic sprinter
- Edwin S. Johnson (1857–1933), U.S. senator from South Dakota
- Edwin C. Johnson (1884–1970), U.S. senator and governor of Colorado
- Edwin G. Johnson (1922–1999), U.S. politician for Pennsylvania, in office 1979–1992
- Edwin Boyd Johnson (1904–1968), American painter, designer, muralist and photographer
- Edwin Beaumont Johnson (1825–1893), British Army officer
- Sir Edwin Johnson (judge) (born 1963), British High Court judge
- Ed Johnson (baseball) (Edwin Cyril Johnson, 1899–1975), American Major League Baseball player
- Eddie Johnson (musician) (Edwin Lawrence Johnson, 1920–2010), American jazz and blues tenor saxophonist
