= Bill Laimbeer =

American basketball player and coach (born 1957)

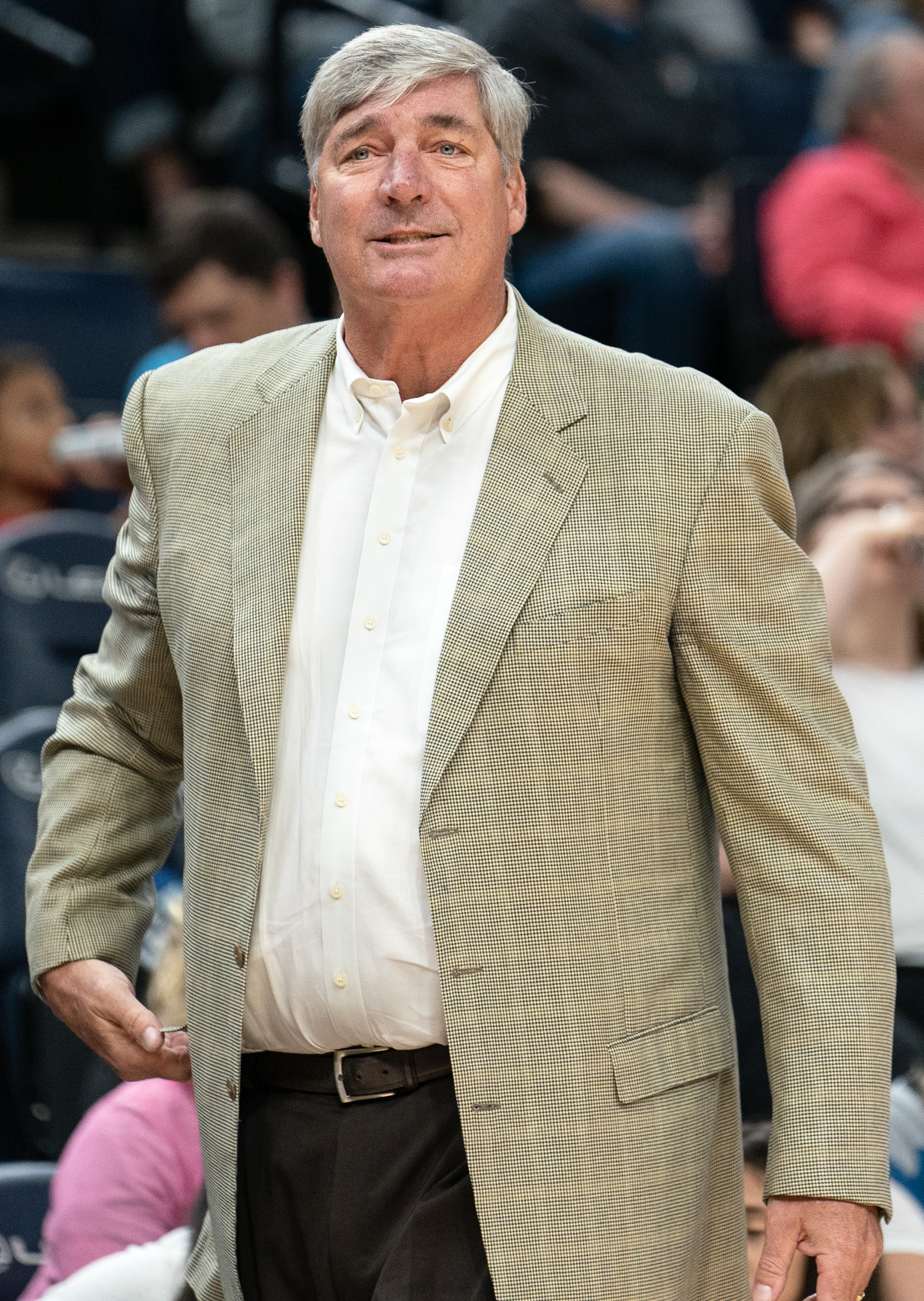
- Laimbeer in 2019 as Las Vegas Aces head coach

Personal information
- Born: May 19, 1957 (age 69) Boston, Massachusetts, U.S.
- Listed height: 6 ft 11 in (2.11 m)
- Listed weight: 245 lb (111 kg)

Career information
- High school: Palos Verdes (Palos Verdes, California)
- College: Notre Dame (1975–1979)
- NBA draft: 1979: 3rd round, 65th overall pick
- Drafted by: Cleveland Cavaliers
- Playing career: 1979–1993
- Position: Center / power forward
- Number: 41, 40
- Coaching career: 2002–2021

Career history

Playing
- 1979–1980: Basket Brescia
- 1980–1982: Cleveland Cavaliers
- 1982–1993: Detroit Pistons

Coaching
- 2002–2009: Detroit Shock
- 2009–2011: Minnesota Timberwolves (assistant)
- 2013–2017: New York Liberty
- 2018–2021: Las Vegas Aces

Career highlights
- As player: 2× NBA champion (1989, 1990); 4× NBA All-Star (1983–1985, 1987); NBA rebounding leader (1986); No. 40 retired by Detroit Pistons; Second-team Parade All-American (1975); As coach: 3× WNBA champion (2003, 2006, 2008); 2× WNBA Coach of the Year (2003, 2015); WNBA All Star Game Head coach (2019)

Career NBA statistics
- Points: 13,790 (12.9 ppg)
- Rebounds: 10,400 (9.7 rpg)
- Assists: 2,184 (2.0 apg)
- Stats at NBA.com
- Stats at Basketball Reference

William J. Laimbeer Jr. (born May 19, 1957) is an American former professional basketball coach and player who spent the majority of his career with the Detroit Pistons. Known for his physical style of play, he played a big part in the Pistons earning the nickname the “Bad Boys" in the mid-1980s before helping them win back-to-back NBA championships.

In his National Basketball Association (NBA) career, Laimbeer was known for his 11-year tenure with the Detroit Pistons during their "Bad Boys" era. Although a solid shooter and rebounder, Laimbeer became notorious for his physical play and reputation for delivering hard, often flagrant fouls. Laimbeer played at center with Hall of Fame backcourt guards Isiah Thomas and Joe Dumars and forward Dennis Rodman, winning back-to-back NBA Championships in 1989 and 1990 with the Pistons, and being named an NBA All-Star four times. Prior to the NBA, he played for the University of Notre Dame and Palos Verdes High School in Southern California.

After his playing career, Laimbeer served as the head coach and general manager of the Detroit Shock in the WNBA from 2002 to 2009, coaching the team to three league championships in 2003, 2006, and 2008. He was the head coach of the New York Liberty from 2013 to 2017 and the head coach of the Las Vegas Aces from 2018 until 2021. He has twice been named the WNBA's Coach of the Year.

== Early life ==
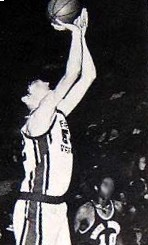
Laimbeer playing for Palos Verdes High School in 1975

William J. Laimbeer Jr. was born on May 19, 1957, in Boston, Massachusetts and raised in the Chicago suburb of Clarendon Hills. He moved with his family to Palos Verdes Estates, California, where he attended Palos Verdes High School. His father, William Laimbeer Sr., was an Owens-Illinois executive who rose to the rank of company president. The younger Laimbeer once famously joked, "I'm the only player in the NBA who makes less money than his father."

Laimbeer played a Sleestak on the children's TV series Land of the Lost when the show solicited the Palos Verdes High School basketball team for tall people to play the character.

As a senior in high school in 1975, Laimbeer led Palos Verdes to a CIF basketball title and a stunning upset over 6-time defending champion Verbum Dei.

== College career ==
Laimbeer played college basketball for the Notre Dame Fighting Irish. He was declared scholastically ineligible midway through his freshman season in January 1976. To regain his eligibility, Laimbeer spent two semesters at Owens Technical College in Toledo, Ohio, and returned to Notre Dame for the 1977–78 season. For his last two years of college, he averaged 7.3 points and 6.0 rebounds per game while playing 20 minutes a game, primarily as a substitute behind starting center Bruce Flowers. Notre Dame appeared in the Final Four of the NCAA Tournament in 1978, and the Elite Eight in 1975.

== Professional career ==
=== Brescia (1979–1980) ===
Laimbeer was drafted by the Cleveland Cavaliers in 1979, but the team's hesitation in signing him led him to spend his first professional season playing for Pinti Inox Brescia in Italy, where he averaged 21.1 points and 12.5 rebounds.

=== Cleveland Cavaliers (1980–1982) ===
Laimbeer returned to play for the Cavaliers in 1980. He was a reserve for the entire 1980–81 season, playing in 81 of 82 games without a start. He continued to have trouble breaking into the starting lineup his sophomore year, starting only 4 games in 50 appearances for the 1981–82 team.

=== Detroit Pistons (1982–1993) ===
On February 16, 1982, Laimbeer was traded to the Detroit Pistons, where he remained for the rest of his career. He was immediately installed as the Pistons starting center. During his playing career, Laimbeer was one of the most notorious players in the NBA. While highly popular among Piston fans, Laimbeer was despised by opposing players and fans for his disdain of his opponents, his poor sportsmanship, and his dangerous play, such as repeatedly committing violent intentional fouls. In the public eye, Laimbeer's reputation for physical play tended to overshadow his skills. His former teammate Dennis Rodman noted this in his book Bad As I Wanna Be, saying, "He [Laimbeer] was more than a thug, but that's what he'll be remembered for." In an interview for the 1990 NBA Home Video release "Pure Pistons," teammate Isiah Thomas also talked about Laimbeer's effect on opposing players, saying, "He frustrates people," but then added, "He frustrates people...because he's good."

In the ESPN 30 for 30 film Bad Boys, Laimbeer said his approach to the game was all psychological. When the Pistons would take to the court before a game, Laimbeer made it a point to lead the rest of the team out from the locker room and he always did so with a scowl on his face to show he was not intimidated by anyone.

While a serviceable and solid player for most of his career, Laimbeer knew there were better skilled players than him. However, there were not as many players who were as physical on the court as he was, and Laimbeer was able to use that to his advantage. The hard-nosed approach he used was designed to wear on opposing players to the point where they began focusing more on retaliating against him and the rest of the Pistons instead of trying to win the game; Laimbeer said if he was able to do that to an opponent during the course of a game, he had broken him down. He even said the local media would play a role as his and the team's reputation preceded them: "When the Pistons came into a town, all the media would write about were the 'Bad Boys' and how rough we played. They'd be asking players if they were going to stand up to us. And once we got teams thinking like that, we had them. We already got them out of their game."

Laimbeer was one of the top outside-shooting centers of his era, draining over 200 three-pointers for his career, and excelled at running the pick and pop with guards Isiah Thomas and Joe Dumars. Then-head coach Chuck Daly used Laimbeer's inside-outside skills to great effect. On the defensive end, Laimbeer was one of the best rebounders in the game. On the offensive end, Daly would often have Laimbeer fade to the perimeter rather than roll to the basket, which had the additional effect of keeping the opposing team's best rebounder far from the backboard.

Laimbeer was selected to the NBA All-Star Game on four occasions (1983, 1984, 1985 and 1987) and finished among the league leaders in rebounding and free throw percentage several times. He won the NBA rebound title in the 1985–86 season. He made a career-high 53.0% of his field goal attempts in the 1983–84 season, and the following season he posted a career-high 17.5 points per game. Laimbeer started on the Pistons' 1989 and 1990 NBA championship teams.

Laimbeer spent 14 seasons in the NBA, mostly with the Detroit Pistons. Laimbeer became the 19th player in league history to amass more than 10,000 points and 10,000 rebounds. Laimbeer was most effective off the defensive glass – for the 1980s, no player in the league totaled more defensive rebounds. He was also remarkably durable, never playing fewer than 79 regular-season games during his first 13 seasons, and playing all 82 games seven times. His streak of 685 consecutive games played (which ended due to suspension in the 1988–89 season) is the fifth longest in league history. Laimbeer retired early in the 1993–94 season at age 36 after an incident in practice with longtime friend Isiah Thomas that led to Thomas breaking his hand. Laimbeer, upset over the fight as well as worried over the reaction of Pistons fans for injuring their team captain, decided to retire, believing the fight with Isiah was his "downfall". He announced his retirement after a meeting with Thomas and head coach Don Chaney that ended with him and Thomas teary-eyed and remaining best friends. Laimbeer had his jersey number (40) retired by the Pistons in February 1995. He remains the franchise's all-time leader in career rebounds.

Laimbeer endorsed a video game for the Super Nintendo Entertainment System, Bill Laimbeer's Combat Basketball, a futuristic basketball game in which physical play is encouraged. In a cameo in the ninth season of Cheers, Kevin McHale of the rival Celtics remarked, when presented with the X-Ray of an adult male gorilla's ankle, "...could be Laimbeer."

== Career statistics ==
Legend
GP	Games played	GS	Games started	MPG	Minutes per game
FG%	Field goal percentage	3P%	3-point field goal percentage	FT%	Free throw percentage
RPG	Rebounds per game	APG	Assists per game	SPG	Steals per game
BPG	Blocks per game	PPG	Points per game	**Bold**	Career high
†	Won an NBA championship	*	Led the league

=== Regular season ===
Year	Team	GP	GS	MPG	FG%	3P%	FT%	RPG	APG	SPG	BPG	PPG
1980–81	Cleveland	81	—	30.4	.503	—	.765	8.6	2.7	.7	1.0	9.8
1981–82	Cleveland	50	4	17.9	.470	**.500**	.775	5.5	.9	.4	.6	6.7
1981–82	Detroit	30	30	31.2	.516	.143	.813	11.3	1.8	.6	1.1	12.8
1982–83	Detroit	**82**	**82**	35.0	.497	.154	.790	12.1	**3.2**	.6	**1.4**	13.6
1983–84	Detroit	**82**	**82**	34.9	**.530**	.000	.866	12.2	1.8	.6	1.0	17.3
1984–85	Detroit	**82**	**82**	**35.3**	.506	.222	.797	12.4	1.9	.8	.9	**17.5**
1985–86	Detroit	**82**	**82**	**35.3**	.492	.286	.834	**13.1***	1.8	.7	.8	16.6
1986–87	Detroit	**82**	**82**	34.8	.501	.286	**.894**	11.6	1.8	**.9**	.8	15.4
1987–88	Detroit	**82**	**82**	**35.3**	.493	.333	.874	10.1	2.4	.8	1.0	13.5
1988–89†	Detroit	81	81	32.6	.499	.349	.840	9.6	2.2	.6	1.2	13.7
1989–90†	Detroit	81	81	33.0	.484	.361	.854	9.6	2.1	.7	1.0	12.1
1990–91	Detroit	**82**	81	32.5	.478	.296	.837	9.0	1.9	.5	.7	11.0
1991–92	Detroit	81	46	27.6	.470	.376	.893	5.6	2.0	.6	.7	9.7
1992–93	Detroit	79	41	24.5	.509	.370	**.894**	5.3	1.6	.6	.5	8.7
1993–94	Detroit	11	5	22.5	.522	.333	.846	5.1	1.3	.5	.4	9.9
Career		1,068	861	31.8	.498	.326	.837	9.7	2.0	.7	.9	12.9
All-Star		4	0	11.3	.650	—	.667	2.8	.5	.5	.5	7.0

=== Playoffs ===
Year	Team	GP	GS	MPG	FG%	3P%	FT%	RPG	APG	SPG	BPG	PPG
1984	Detroit	5	0	33.0	**.569**	—	.900	12.4	2.4	.8	.6	15.2
1985	Detroit	9	9	36.1	.449	.000	.706	10.7	1.7	.8	.8	14.7
1986	Detroit	4	4	**42.0**	.500	**1.000**	.913	**14.0**	.3	.5	.8	**22.5**
1987	Detroit	15	15	36.2	.515	.200	.625	10.4	**2.5**	1.0	.8	12.3
1988	Detroit	**23**	**23**	33.9	.456	.294	.889	9.6	1.9	.8	.8	11.9
1989†	Detroit	17	17	29.2	.465	.357	.806	8.2	1.8	.4	.5	10.1
1990†	Detroit	20	20	33.4	.457	.349	.862	10.6	1.4	**1.2**	**.9**	11.1
1991	Detroit	15	15	29.7	.446	.294	.871	8.1	1.3	.3	.8	10.9
1992	Detroit	5	4	29.0	.370	.200	**1.000**	6.6	1.6	.8	.2	8.2
Career		113	107	33.1	.468	.321	.819	9.7	1.7	.7	.7	12.0

== Post-playing life ==
In 1994, Laimbeer and his father, William Sr. co-founded Laimbeer Packaging Corp., a company located in Melvindale, Michigan, a Detroit suburb, producing corrugated cardboard boxes. The company struggled through the late 1990s and closed in early 2002. Laimbeer won the NBA Shooting Stars Competition at the 2007 All-Star Weekend in Las Vegas along with Chauncey Billups of the Detroit Pistons and Swin Cash of the Detroit Shock. In February 2009 he won the competition with Arron Afflalo and Katie Smith. In 1999, Laimbeer was inducted into the Michigan Sports Hall of Fame.

Laimbeer is a former color commentator for the Pistons and was a studio analyst for ESPN in 2003.

== Coaching career ==
=== Detroit Shock (2002–2009) ===
In the middle of the 2002 WNBA season, Laimbeer took over the head coaching position for the Detroit Shock. A year later, he led the franchise to its first WNBA championship and was named Coach of the Year that year. It marked the first time in WNBA history that a team other than Los Angeles or Houston won the title. On September 9, 2006, Laimbeer led the Shock to their second WNBA championship against the Sacramento Monarchs in five games. Two years later, on October 5, 2008, Laimbeer led the team to its third league championship in six years by defeating San Antonio.

Laimbeer has talked about the possibility of one day coaching in the NBA. The New York Knicks' former team president, former Piston teammate Isiah Thomas, once considered Laimbeer as a possibility. The Pistons, presided by former teammate Joe Dumars, had considered the possibility of Laimbeer replacing departing coach Larry Brown, before ultimately hiring former Minnesota Timberwolves head coach Flip Saunders.

On June 15, 2009, Laimbeer resigned as head coach of the Detroit Shock, due to family reasons and the desire to become an NBA head coach.

=== Minnesota Timberwolves (2009–2012) ===
Though he was unable to secure an NBA head coaching position, that same year Laimbeer was offered, and accepted, an assistant coach position with the Minnesota Timberwolves.

=== New York Liberty (2012–2017) ===
In 2012, Laimbeer returned to the WNBA to become the head coach and general manager of the New York Liberty, replacing John Whisenant. He quickly returned to his pugnacious ways, drawing a fine for saying Minnesota Lynx player Maya Moore "should get hurt" for playing late into a game in which the Lynx easily defeated the Liberty.

On October 14, 2014, the Liberty parted ways with Laimbeer after two seasons, but he was rehired as the Liberty head coach on January 8, 2015.

=== Las Vegas Aces (2018–2021) ===
On October 17, 2017, the then-unnamed Las Vegas Aces announced Laimbeer as head coach and President of Basketball Operations. Laimbeer coached the Aces through 2021. After the 2021 season Laimbeer retired from coaching.

In total, Laimbeer finished first seven times as a head coach in the WNBA, winning the WNBA Finals three times in five trips.

=== Coaching record ===
Legend
Regular season	G	Games coached	W	Games won	L	Games lost	W–L %	Win–loss %
Playoffs	PG	Playoff games	PW	Playoff wins	PL	Playoff losses	PW–L %	Playoff win–loss %

Team	Year	G	W	L	W–L%	Finish	PG	PW	PL	PW–L%	Result
DES	2002	22	9	13	.409	8th in Eastern	—	—	—	—	Missed playoffs
DES	2003	34	25	9	.735	1st in Eastern	8	6	2	.750	Won WNBA Championship
DES	2004	34	17	17	.500	3rd in Eastern	3	1	2	.333	Lost in Conference semifinals
DES	2005	34	16	18	.471	4th in Eastern	2	0	2	.000	Lost in Conference semifinals
DES	2006	34	23	11	.676	2nd in Eastern	10	7	3	.700	Won WNBA Championship
DES	2007	34	24	10	.706	1st in Eastern	11	6	5	.545	Lost in WNBA Finals
DES	2008	34	22	12	.647	1st in Eastern	9	7	2	.778	Won WNBA Championship
DES	2009	4	1	3	.250	(resigned)	—	—	—	—	
NYL	2013	34	11	23	.324	5th in Eastern	—	—	—	—	Missed playoffs
NYL	2014	34	15	19	.441	5th in Eastern	—	—	—	—	Missed playoffs
NYL	2015	34	23	11	.676	1st in Eastern	5	3	2	.600	Lost in Conference finals
NYL	2016	34	21	13	.618	1st in Eastern	1	0	1	.000	Lost in Second Round
NYL	2017	34	22	12	.647	1st in Eastern	1	0	1	.000	Lost in Second Round
LVA	2018	34	14	20	.412	6th in Western	—	—	—	—	Missed playoffs
LVA	2019	34	21	13	.618	2nd in Western	5	2	3	.400	Lost in Conference finals
LVA	2020	22	18	4	.818	1st in Western	8	3	5	.375	Lost in WNBA Finals
LVA	2021	32	24	8	.750	1st in Western	5	2	3	.400	Lost in Conference finals
Career		521	306	215	.587		68	37	31	.544	

== In popular culture ==
In 1990, Nintendo ported a game called Future Basketball to their SNES console under the name Bill Laimbeer's Combat Basketball. The game was set in a future where Laimbeer was commissioner of a basketball league with no rules, and weapons allowed.

The song "Tough Guy" off the 1994 Beastie Boys album Ill Communication mentions Laimbeer referencing his physically aggressive style of playing basketball.

Laimbeer is referenced by name in the 2005 song "Welcome to Tally Hall" by Michigan-based band Tally Hall.

Laimbeer is also referenced by name in the 2025 song "Jordan Rules" by alternative rapper and producer JPEGMafia.

== See also ==
- List of NBA career rebounding leaders
- List of NBA career personal fouls leaders
- List of NBA annual rebounding leaders
