= Steve Kerr =

American basketball player and coach (born 1965)

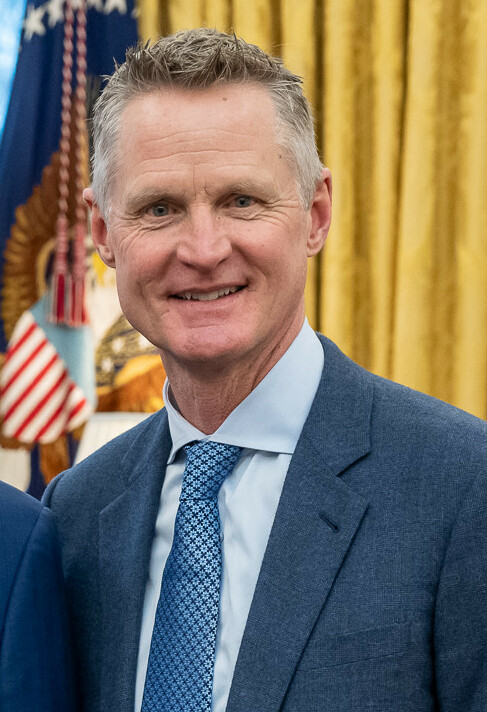
- Kerr at the White House in 2023

Golden State Warriors
- Title: Head coach
- League: NBA

Personal information
- Born: September 27, 1965 (age 61) Beirut, Lebanon
- Listed height: 6 ft 1 in (1.85 m)
- Listed weight: 180 lb (82 kg)

Career information
- High school: Palisades (Pacific Palisades, California)
- College: Arizona (1983–1988)
- NBA draft: 1988: 2nd round, 50th overall pick
- Drafted by: Phoenix Suns
- Playing career: 1988–2003
- Position: Point guard / Shooting guard
- Number: 4, 5, 2, 25
- Coaching career: 2014–present

Career history

Playing
- 1988–1989: Phoenix Suns
- 1989–1992: Cleveland Cavaliers
- 1992–1993: Orlando Magic
- 1993–1998: Chicago Bulls
- 1999–2001: San Antonio Spurs
- 2001–2002: Portland Trail Blazers
- 2002–2003: San Antonio Spurs

Coaching
- 2014–present: Golden State Warriors

Career highlights
- As player: 5× NBA champion (1996–1999, 2003); NBA Three-Point Contest champion (1997); Second-team All-American – AP (1988); Third-team All-American – NABC (1988); 2× First-team All-Pac-10 (1986, 1988); USBWA Most Courageous Award (1988); No. 25 retired by Arizona Wildcats; As head coach: 4× NBA champion (2015, 2017, 2018, 2022); NBA Coach of the Year (2016); 2× NBA All-Star Game head coach (2015, 2017); Top 15 Coaches in NBA History

Career NBA statistics
- Points: 5,437 (6.0 ppg)
- Rebounds: 1,060 (1.2 rpg)
- Assists: 1,658 (1.8 apg)
- Stats at NBA.com
- Stats at Basketball Reference
Medals
Men's basketball
Representing the United States
FIBA World Championship
Gold medal – first place	1986 Spain	National team
Assistant coach for the United States
Olympic Games
Gold medal – first place	2020 Tokyo	Team
Head coach for the United States
Olympic Games
Gold medal – first place	2024 Paris	Team

Stephen Douglas Kerr (born September 27, 1965) is an American professional basketball coach and former player who is the head coach for the Golden State Warriors of the National Basketball Association (NBA). He was the head coach of the U.S. national team. Kerr is known as one of the most accurate three-point shooters in NBA history and holds the record for highest career three-point percentage. He is also a nine-time NBA champion, having won five titles as a player and four as a head coach. Kerr was named one of the 15 Greatest Coaches in NBA History.

Kerr played college basketball for the Arizona Wildcats. He was a two-time first-team all-conference player in the Pac-10 (now known as the Pac-12) and earned All-American honors as a senior in 1988. In the 1987–88 season, Kerr set the NCAA single-season three-point field goal percentage record (57.3%). Selected by the Phoenix Suns in the second round of the 1988 NBA draft, Kerr played 15 seasons in the NBA. He won five NBA championships as a player—three with the Chicago Bulls and two with the San Antonio Spurs—and retired as the all-time NBA leader in single-season three-point shooting percentage and career three-point shooting percentage.

Following his retirement as a player, Kerr became a minority owner of the Phoenix Suns as part of a group led by Robert Sarver that purchased the team in 2004. In June 2007, Phoenix named Kerr the team's president of basketball operations and general manager. Kerr announced he was leaving the position in June 2010. After stepping down from his post with the Suns, Kerr worked as a color commentator for NBA on TNT until 2014.

In May 2014, Kerr was named head coach of the Warriors. Under his leadership, the franchise entered the most successful period in its history, reaching the NBA Finals six times and winning four championships (in 2015, 2017, 2018, and 2022). The 2015–16 Warriors won an unprecedented 73 games, breaking the record for the most wins in an NBA season.

== Early life and international play ==
Kerr was born on September 27, 1965, in Beirut, Lebanon to Malcolm H. Kerr, a Lebanese-born American academic, and Ann Kerr (née Zwicker), an American academic from California. Both of his parents specialized in the Middle East. Kerr has three siblings. His paternal grandfather, Stanley Kerr, volunteered with the Near East Relief after the Armenian genocide and rescued women and orphans in Aleppo and Marash before eventually settling in Beirut. Kerr spent much of his childhood in Lebanon and other Middle Eastern countries such as Egypt, where he attended Cairo American College. While in Beirut in the summer of 1983, Kerr met a number of U.S. Marines who were later killed in the Beirut barracks bombings. He graduated from Palisades High School in Los Angeles in 1983.

On January 18, 1984, Malcolm Kerr was killed by members of the Islamic Jihad at age 52 while serving as president of the American University of Beirut. Malcolm was shot twice in the back of his head by gunmen using suppressed handguns in the hallway outside his office. Kerr was an 18-year-old college freshman at the time of his father's death. Regarding his father's death, Kerr has said: "Before my father was killed, my life was impenetrable. Bad things happened to other people."

During the summer of 1986, Kerr was named to the U.S. national team that competed in the FIBA World Championship in Spain. The team won the title for the first time since 1954 and was the last American men's senior squad not to feature NBA players that had won a major international tournament. Kerr suffered a torn ACL during the competition.

== College career ==
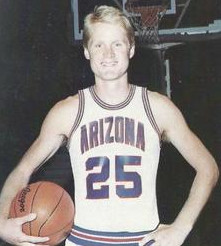
Kerr in 1987

Minimally recruited out of high school, Kerr played basketball at the University of Arizona from 1983 to 1988. A guard, Kerr injured his knee playing in the 1986 FIBA World Championship, forcing him to miss the Wildcats' entire 1986–87 season.

During pre-game warmups at arch-rival Arizona State University in 1988, Kerr was taunted by Sun Devils fans with chants that included "PLO" and "Where’s your father?" Though tearful, Kerr led the Wildcats to victory, scoring 20 points in the first half, making all six of his three-point attempts. Arizona State athletic director Charles Harris sent a letter of apology to Kerr a few days later. Along with fellow All-American teammate Sean Elliott, Kerr helped the Wildcats reach the Final Four of the 1988 NCAA tournament. A two-time first-team All-Pac-10 selection, he also set an NCAA single-season record for three-point percentage (57.3%, 114–199) in 1987–88. (Note: Based on minimum of 100 made. Glenn Tropf of Holy Cross set the record for minimum of 50 makes (63.4%, 52–82), also in 1987–88.) The NCAA introduced the three-point shot while Kerr was redshirting. In his only collegiate season with the three-point shot, Kerr established standards that formerly stood as Pac-12 records for nearly two decades: single-season three-point shots made (114; stood until Salim Stoudamire posted 120 in 2005), Pac-12 tournament run three-point field goal percentage (.750, min 5 made; Marcus Williams, .833, 2006). He led the Pac-10 in free throw shooting in 1985–86 (89.9%).

Kerr graduated from the University of Arizona in 1988 with a Bachelor of General Studies, with an emphasis on history, sociology, and English. He finished his collegiate basketball career with an average of 11.2 points per game and a 54.8% field goal percentage.

== Professional career ==
=== Phoenix Suns (1988–1989) ===
Kerr was selected by the Phoenix Suns in the second round (50th overall) of the 1988 NBA draft. He averaged 2.1 points per game for the Suns in 26 games as a rookie.

=== Cleveland Cavaliers (1989–1992) ===
In 1989, Kerr was traded to the Cleveland Cavaliers for draft consideration. In over three seasons with the Cavaliers, he set the team's franchise single-season (.507, 1989–90) and career three-point field goal percentage (.472) records.

=== Orlando Magic (1992–1993) ===
In December 1992, Kerr was traded to the Orlando Magic for draft considerations. He averaged 2.6 points per game during his tenure with Orlando.

=== Chicago Bulls (1993–1998) ===
In 1993, Kerr signed with the Chicago Bulls. He played in Chicago for five seasons and typically came off of the bench, playing the role of three-point shooting specialist. The Bulls made the playoffs in the 1993–94 and 1994–95 seasons, but without Michael Jordan's presence for all of 1994 and much of 1995, the team was unable to advance to the Finals. However, with Jordan back full-time for the 1995–96 season, the Bulls set a then-NBA record of 72–10 and defeated the Seattle SuperSonics in the 1996 NBA Finals in six games.

In 1997, the Bulls logged a 69–13 regular-season record and reached the 1997 NBA Finals, where they faced the Utah Jazz. At the end of Game 6, with the score tied at 86, Kerr took a pass from Jordan and made a 17-foot jump shot to win the championship for the Bulls. Kerr also won the Three-Point Contest at the 1997 NBA All-Star Weekend.

In the last minute of Game 2 of the 1998 NBA Finals against Utah, Kerr missed a three-pointer, grabbed his own rebound, and made a pass to Jordan. Jordan made a crucial three-point play, putting the Bulls in the lead for good and helping the team tie the series at one game apiece. The Bulls went on to win the series in six games.

Kerr set the Bulls' franchise single-season (.524, 1994–95) and career three-point field goal percentage (.479) records. During his tenure with the Bulls, Kerr averaged 8.2 points per game on 50.7% shooting.

=== San Antonio Spurs (1999–2001) ===
In January 1999, Kerr was acquired by the San Antonio Spurs in a sign-and-trade deal with the Bulls, whereby Chuck Person and a first-round pick in the 2000 NBA draft was sent to Chicago. The Spurs reached the 1999 NBA Finals and won their first NBA Championship with a 4–1 series victory over the New York Knicks. Kerr and Frank Saul were the only two players in NBA history to have won three championships with two different teams in consecutive seasons, until Patrick McCaw, whom Kerr later coached with the Warriors, achieved the same feat in 2019.

=== Portland Trail Blazers (2001–2002) ===
On July 24, 2001, Kerr was traded to the Portland Trail Blazers alongside Derek Anderson in a deal that brought Steve Smith to the Spurs. Kerr would remain in Portland for the 2001–02 season, playing in 65 games and averaging 4.1 points per game.

=== Return to San Antonio (2002–2003) ===
On August 2, 2002, Kerr was traded back to San Antonio along with Erick Barkley and a 2003 second-round pick. In return, the Trail Blazers received Charles Smith, Amal McCaskill, and Antonio Daniels. Kerr played in nearly every game (75) the following year, which was his final season in the league. In Game 6 of the 2003 Western Conference Finals against the Dallas Mavericks, Kerr made four second-half three-pointers that helped the Spurs win the game and eliminate Dallas from the playoffs. The Spurs eventually won the NBA championship by beating the New Jersey Nets during the 2003 NBA Finals in six games.

=== Retirement ===
Kerr announced his retirement after the 2003 NBA Finals. During his NBA career, Kerr won five NBA championships. He retired as the league's all-time leader in single-season three-point shooting percentage (.524 in 1994–95) and career three-point shooting percentage (.454). As of 2024, Kerr is the only NBA player to win four straight NBA titles after 1969.

== Broadcaster and commentator ==
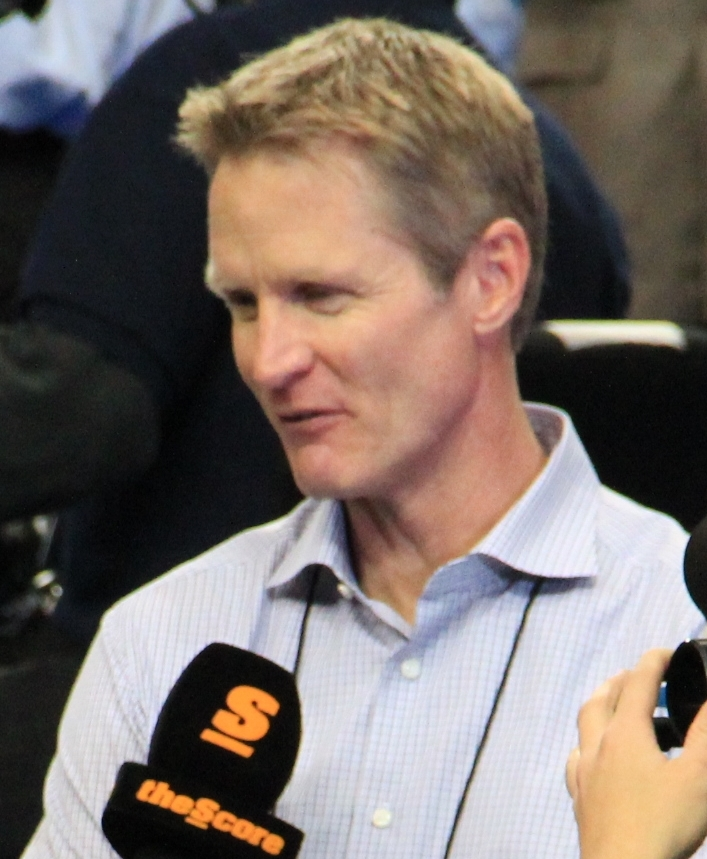
Kerr in 2013

In 2003, Kerr became a broadcast analyst for Turner Network Television (TNT), offering commentary alongside analyst Marv Albert. During his tenure, Kerr performed a segment sponsored by Coors Light called Steve's Refreshing Thoughts in which he brought up interesting facts in NBA history. This segment continued through sponsorship and became known as Steve Wonders, sponsored by Sprint. In the same time period, Kerr also contributed to Yahoo! as an NBA commentator.

Kerr left broadcasting in 2007 to become the general manager of the Phoenix Suns, but he returned as an NBA analyst for TNT for the 2010–11 NBA season. In 2011, he also called the NCAA Men's Division I Basketball Championship on Turner Sports and CBS, teaming up with lead broadcasters Jim Nantz and Clark Kellogg for the First Four and Final Four games, and with Albert in other rounds. Kerr was also a regular contributor to the website Grantland from 2011 until it closed in 2015.

Kerr also worked as a color commentator in the video games NBA Live 06 to NBA Live 10 and NBA 2K12 to NBA 2K15.

== Executive career ==
=== Phoenix Suns (2004–2010) ===
On April 15, 2004, Kerr was announced as a member of a potential group of buyers that would acquire his old team, the Phoenix Suns, from Jerry Colangelo for $300 million. Kerr became part of Suns management, acting as a consultant. During the 2006 NBA All-Star Weekend, he was a member of the San Antonio team that won the Shooting Stars Competition.

On June 2, 2007, Kerr announced that he would become the general manager of the Phoenix Suns beginning with the 2007–08 season. In 2008, the Suns traded forward Shawn Marion and guard Marcus Banks to the Miami Heat in exchange for Shaquille O'Neal. The Suns were eliminated by the San Antonio Spurs in five games in the first round of the playoffs. On December 10, 2008, Kerr continued to remake the Suns roster by trading Boris Diaw, Raja Bell, and Sean Singletary to the Charlotte Bobcats in exchange for Jason Richardson, Jared Dudley, and the Bobcats' 2010 second-round draft pick, which was used to draft Gani Lawal of Georgia Tech. On June 25, 2009, he traded O'Neal to the Cleveland Cavaliers for Ben Wallace, Sasha Pavlovic, a future second-round draft pick and cash.

On May 5, 2010, the Suns wore their "Noche Latina" Los Suns jerseys in Game 2 against the Spurs to be united against the controversial Arizona immigration law. Kerr himself compared the law to Nazi Germany.

In 2010, Kerr left the Suns as president of basketball operations and general manager. He continued to own less than one percent of the Suns' organization until 2014, when he decided to coach the Golden State Warriors.

== Coaching career ==
=== Golden State Warriors (2014–present) ===
==== 2014–15 season: Emergence of Stephen Curry and the beginning of a dynasty ====
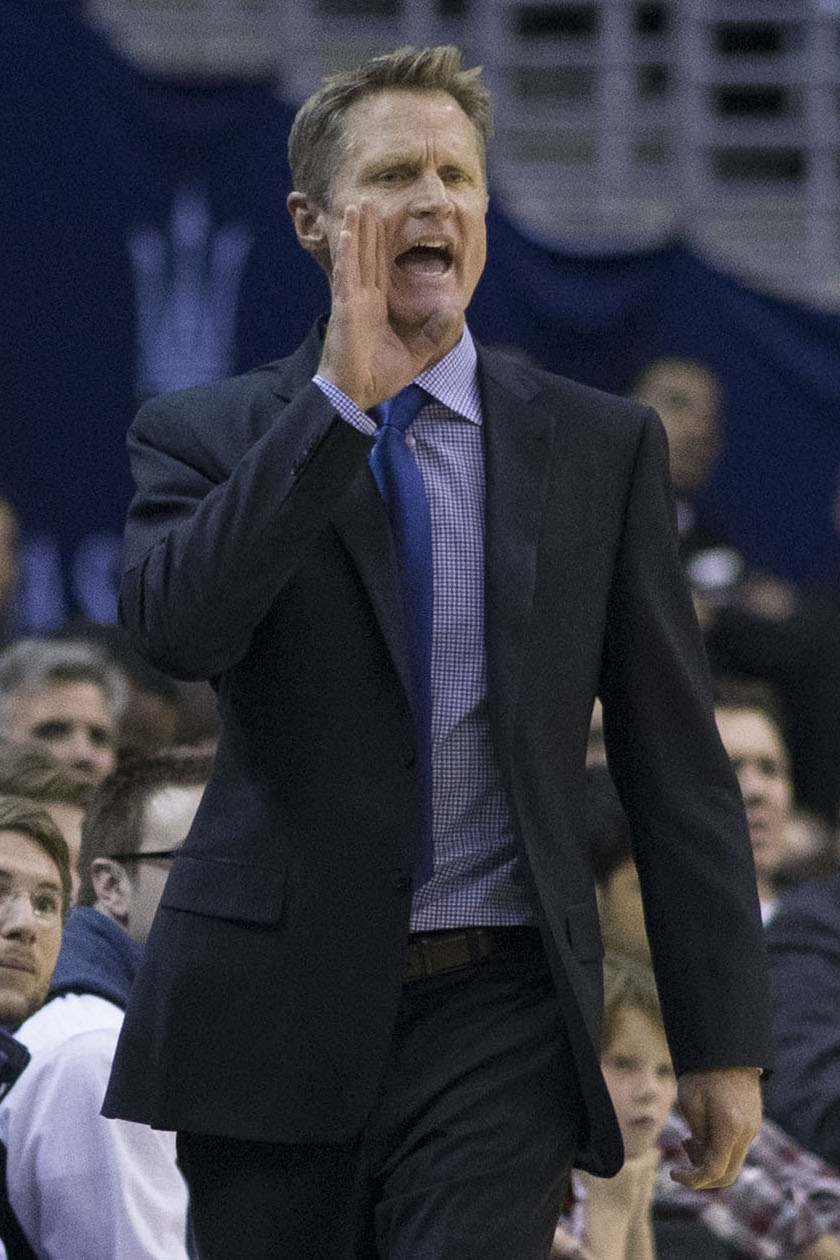
Kerr in 2015

On May 14, 2014, Kerr who was given head coaching offers by the Golden State Warriors and New York Knicks in the 2014 offseason, reached an agreement to become the head coach for the Warriors on a five-year, $25 million deal, succeeding Mark Jackson. Kerr coached in the 2014 Summer League for the Warriors. During the 2014–15 season, the team's offense employed elements of the triangle offense from his playing days in Chicago under Phil Jackson, the spacing and pace of Gregg Popovich in San Antonio, and the uptempo principles Mike D'Antoni and later Alvin Gentry used in Phoenix when Kerr was the general manager.

After the Warriors beat the Houston Rockets to win their 14th consecutive game, Kerr became the first coach to start his career with a 19–2 record. This beat out Al Cervi and his 18–2 start with the Syracuse Nationals. On December 10, 2014, Kerr became the first NBA rookie head coach to win 21 of his first 23 games. He was named the head coach of the Western Conference team for the 2015 NBA All-Star Game after the Warriors had the best record in the conference. On April 4, the Warriors beat the Dallas Mavericks 123–110 to clinch home-court advantage throughout the playoffs, and Kerr got his 63rd win of the season to become the highest winning rookie head coach in NBA history, passing Tom Thibodeau and his 62 wins with the Chicago Bulls in the 2010–11 season. In the NBA Coach of the Year voting, Kerr was the runner-up to Mike Budenholzer.

The Warriors ultimately finished with one of the best regular seasons in NBA history, and the greatest in the team's 69-year history. They ended with an overall record of 67–15, becoming the 10th team to win 67 or more games in a single season and point guard Stephen Curry won his first of two consecutive regular season MVP awards. It was the first time the Warriors had ever won as many as 60 games in a season; their previous high was 59 in the 1975–76 season. They also ended with a 39–2 home record, which is tied for the second-best home record in NBA history. The Warriors were first in defensive efficiency for the season and second in offensive efficiency, barely missing the mark that the Julius Erving–led Sixers achieved by being first in both offensive and defensive efficiency. The Warriors became the first team in NBA history to have two win streaks over 15 at home (18 and 19).

In the first round of the playoffs against the New Orleans Pelicans, Kerr led the Warriors to their first four-game playoff sweep since the 1975 NBA Finals. Afterwards, the team beat the Memphis Grizzlies in six games during the Western Conference Semifinals. Down 2–1 in the series, Kerr made an unconventional adjustment in Game 4 to leave the Grizzlies' Tony Allen open and have his defender, center Andrew Bogut, guard the interior. This strategy was lauded after Allen, Memphis' best wing defender but a poor jump-shooter, was benched and limited to 16 minutes after missing wide open shots. The Warriors then defeated the Houston Rockets in five games during the Western Conference finals, making the NBA Finals for the first time in 40 years.

The Warriors faced the Cleveland Cavaliers in the 2015 NBA Finals. Kerr and coach David Blatt were both in their first season as NBA head coaches, and this was the first time a pair of rookie head coaches faced each other in the NBA Finals since the NBA's first year of existence, in 1947 with Eddie Gottlieb of the Philadelphia Warriors and Harold Olsen of the Chicago Stags competing. After the Warriors went down 2–1 to Cleveland, Kerr started swingman Andre Iguodala in place of Bogut, jump-starting their stagnant offense for a 103–82 road victory that evened the series. It was Iguodala's first start of the season, and the small unit came to be known as the Death Lineup. After the game, Kerr admitted to lying to the press in response to pregame questions about potential changes to his starting lineup. The Warriors went on to win the series in six games, defeating the Cavaliers, giving Kerr his sixth championship and his first as a head coach.

==== 2015–16: Several-month absence amid historic season ====
After the first two days of the defending champion Warriors' training camp, Kerr took an indefinite leave of absence to rehabilitate his back, which had caused problems since the 2015 NBA Finals. Around this time, assistant coach Luke Walton assumed Kerr's coaching duties. Kerr missed all of 2015 and most of January 2016, although technically the NBA credited Walton's win–loss record to Kerr. Kerr said, "I think it's ridiculous", when asked about getting all of Walton's wins. On January 22, 2016, Kerr returned to coaching after missing 43 games, but warned he might need to miss games occasionally if there was a recurrence of the headaches and pain related to the spinal fluid leak that sidelined him. The Warriors went 39–4 with interim coach Luke Walton. The Warriors finished with a 34–5 record after Kerr returned to coaching, and the team broke the 1995–96 Chicago Bulls 72–10 record by winning 73 games. For his record-breaking season, Stephen Curry was named the league's first ever unanimous MVP in history, becoming the 11th player in history to win the award in consecutive seasons and the first guard to do so since Steve Nash in 2004–05 and 2005–06. Curry's scoring average increase of 6.3 is the largest ever by a reigning MVP. Kerr became the first person in NBA history to be a part of 70-win teams as a player and head coach and was named 2015–16 NBA Coach of the Year. Kerr led the Warriors to the 2016 NBA Finals, where they would again face the Cavaliers, but the Warriors lost in seven games despite a 3–1 lead.

==== 2016–19: Arrival of Kevin Durant, back-to-back championships ====
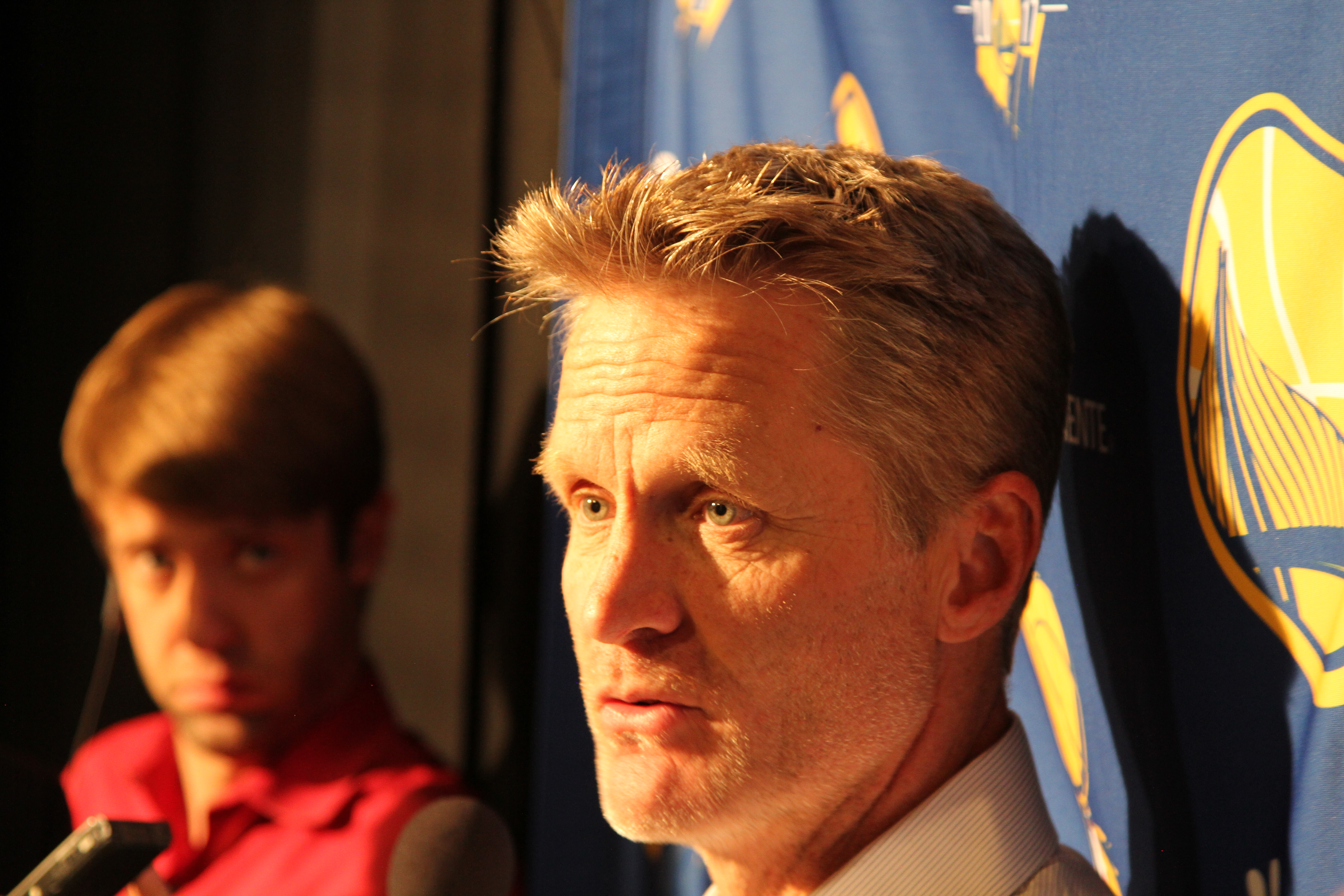
Kerr in 2017

On July 4, 2016, the Warriors had made a landmark acquisition, signing free agent and seven-time NBA All-Star Kevin Durant and the Warriors were immediately hailed as a "superteam" by the media and fans, forming a new All-Star "Fantastic Four" of Durant, Stephen Curry, Klay Thompson and Draymond Green. On November 20, 2016, the NBA announced that Kerr had been fined $25,000 for public criticism of officiating during a radio interview with KNBR 680 three days prior. The Warriors broke over 20 NBA records on their way to equaling their 2014–15 regular-season record of 67–15, their second most wins in franchise history.

Kerr missed time during the 2017 playoffs due to recurring back issues. Associate head coach Mike Brown acted as acting head coach during periods of Kerr's absence, and Brown continued head coaching into the playoffs leading the Warriors to a 13–0 record in the postseason. Kerr returned in Game 2 of the 2017 NBA Finals, where the Warriors defeated the Cleveland Cavaliers in five games. The Warriors finished the playoffs with a 16–1 record, the best postseason winning percentage in NBA history. Kerr is the fourth coach in NBA history to win two championships in his first three seasons of coaching.

Kerr won his third championship as a head coach when the Warriors swept the Cleveland Cavaliers in four games during the 2018 NBA Finals to give Kerr his eighth championship of his career. The Warriors reached their fifth straight Finals under Kerr in 2019, but were defeated by the Toronto Raptors in six games. During Game 5, starting power forward Kevin Durant tore his Achilles, and starting shooting guard Klay Thompson tore his ACL in the next game.

==== 2019–22: Injury-plagued season before a return to the promised land ====
During the 2019–20 season, with Thompson out for the year and franchise point guard Stephen Curry only playing five games due to a hand injury, the Warriors finished with the worst record (15–50) in the league. It marked the first time in Kerr's coaching career that he had missed the playoffs. In 2020–21, with Thompson still out due to an Achilles tear but Curry healthy, the Warriors qualified for the newly implemented play-in tournament, but ultimately did not qualify for the playoffs for the second straight season. The Warriors returned to the playoffs in 2021–22 and reached the 2022 NBA Finals, where they defeated the Boston Celtics in six games, giving Kerr his fourth championship as a head coach and his ninth championship overall.

==== 2022–present: Years of mediocracy and departure of Klay Thompson ====
During the 2022–23 season, Kerr and the Warriors reached the Western Conference Semifinals, where they lost to the Los Angeles Lakers in six games.

On July 6, 2024, shooting guard Klay Thompson signed with the Dallas Mavericks on a three-year, $50 million contract via a six-team sign and trade, thus splitting up the Splash Brothers duo after thirteen years.

On April 20, 2025, with a 95–85 victory over the Houston Rockets in Game 1 of the First Round, Kerr recorded his 100th playoff win as a head coach, tying Larry Brown for sixth place in the list. The Warriors would go on to defeat Houston in seven games, as they did in the Western Conference Finals seven years earlier, before falling in the Semi-Finals to the Minnesota Timberwolves in five games after Curry suffered a strained hamstring during the lone victory in Game 1 which held him out for the remainder of the series.

On May 9, 2026, he agreed to a two–year contract to return to Golden State following the expiry of his previous deal.

=== United States national team ===
Kerr was an assistant coach on the gold medal-winning United States men's Olympic basketball team at the 2020 Summer Olympics. In December 2021, he was named head coach of the U.S. men's basketball team. In 2023, Kerr led the American team to a disappointing fourth place finish at the FIBA World Cup as the U.S. failed to win a medal for the second consecutive tournament after an overtime loss to Canada in the bronze medal game, 127–118.

==== 2024 Summer Olympics ====
At the 2024 Summer Olympics, Kerr coached the U.S. team to its fifth consecutive gold medal at Paris' Bercy Arena in a win over host country France, 98–87. This was a reprise of the win over the French at the Tokyo Olympics.

=== Legacy ===
Kerr is the first head coach in NBA history to lead his team to 67 or more wins in three consecutive seasons. He was named one of the Top 15 Coaches in NBA History in 2022, when the league commemorated its 75th anniversary. In March 2025, Kerr overtook Al Attles as the Warriors coach with the most wins in franchise history.

== Personal life ==
Kerr married Margot Brennan, his college sweetheart, in 1990. They have three children: Nick, Madeleine, and Matthew. Nick is an assistant head coach for the Warriors. Kerr is a keen soccer fan and an avid supporter of Liverpool. In 2023, he bought a minority stake in Segunda División club Mallorca.

=== Political views and activism ===
Prior to and following the 2016 United States presidential election, Kerr has been publicly critical of Donald Trump. In an interview following that election, Kerr voiced the opinion that Trump's rise to power was based on insults against women and minorities. Kerr compared Trump's campaign performances and the crude responses of his supporters to the sensationalism of The Jerry Springer Show. Kerr made clear his "disgust" with Trump's disrespectful public discourse and disappointment with his leadership of the country. On October 27, 2020, an ad created by the anti-Trump Republican Lincoln Project Super PAC was first broadcast. In it, along with Philadelphia 76ers coach Doc Rivers, Kerr endorsed Joe Biden for president in the November presidential election. In the advertisement, Kerr said, "I stand for truth over lies", "categorically reject white supremacy", and "believe a presidency should be transparent."

Kerr has been a strong supporter of gun control, expressing criticism with the government's response to school shootings. On May 24, 2022, during a press conference for Game 4 of the NBA's 2022 Western Conference finals after that day's Robb Elementary School shooting in Texas where 19 children and two teachers were murdered by a gunman wielding semi-automatic weapons, Kerr reiterated these points emotionally. He said that Republicans in the U.S. Senate were "holding us hostage" by using filibuster to prevent a vote on gun control legislation.

Kerr has voiced support for the Black Lives Matter movements across the United States, praising the efforts of peaceful protests and hopes that more people will take action to stand up to systemic racial injustice to black people.

Kerr spoke at the 2024 Democratic National Convention on August 19, 2024.

==== Armenian genocide ====
Kerr has also spoken publicly about the Armenian genocide, criticizing the lack of awareness of the atrocities and Turkey's refusal to recognize them as a genocide. He has maintained close ties with the Armenian community in the United States, largely through the legacy of his grandparents, Stanley Kerr and Elsa Reckman Kerr, who helped rescue and care for thousands of Armenian orphans in the aftermath of the genocide.

In February 2019, Kerr attended a ceremony honoring his grandparents' humanitarian work at an Armenian school in San Francisco, where he expressed pride in their legacy.

== Career statistics ==
Legend
GP	Games played	GS	Games started	MPG	Minutes per game
FG%	Field goal percentage	3P%	3-point field goal percentage	FT%	Free throw percentage
RPG	Rebounds per game	APG	Assists per game	SPG	Steals per game
BPG	Blocks per game	PPG	Points per game	**Bold**	Career high
†	Won an NBA championship	*	Led the league	‡	NBA record

=== NBA ===
==== Regular season ====
Year	Team	GP	GS	MPG	FG%	3P%	FT%	RPG	APG	SPG	BPG	PPG
1988–89	Phoenix	26	0	6.0	.435	.471	.667	.7	.9	.3	.0	2.1
1989–90	Cleveland	78	5	21.3	.444	.507*	.863	1.3	**3.2**	.6	.1	6.7
1990–91	Cleveland	57	4	15.9	.444	.452	.849	.6	2.3	.5	.1	4.8
1991–92	Cleveland	48	**20**	17.6	.511	.432	.833	**1.6**	2.3	.6	**.2**	6.6
1992–93	Cleveland	5	0	8.2	.500	.000	**1.000**	1.4	2.2	.4	.0	2.4
1992–93	Orlando	47	0	9.4	.429	.250	.909	.8	1.3	.2	.0	2.6
1993–94	Chicago	**82**	0	**24.8**	.497	.419	.856	**1.6**	2.6	**.9**	.0	**8.6**
1994–95	Chicago	**82***	0	22.4	.527	**.524***	.778	1.5	1.8	.5	.0	8.2
1995–96†	Chicago	**82**	0	23.4	.506	.515	.929	1.3	2.3	.8	.0	8.4
1996–97†	Chicago	**82**	0	22.7	**.533**	.464	.806	**1.6**	2.1	.8	.0	8.1
1997–98†	Chicago	50	0	22.4	.454	.438	.918	1.5	1.9	.5	.1	7.5
1998–99†	San Antonio	44	0	16.7	.391	.313	.886	1.0	1.1	.5	.1	4.4
1999–00	San Antonio	32	0	8.4	.432	.516	.818	.6	.4	.1	.0	2.8
2000–01	San Antonio	55	1	11.8	.421	.429	.933	.6	1.0	.3	.0	3.3
2001–02	Portland	65	0	11.9	.470	.394	.975	.9	1.0	.2	.0	4.1
2002–03†	San Antonio	75	0	12.7	.430	.395	.882	.8	.9	.4	.0	4.0
Career		910	30	17.8	.479	.454‡	.864	1.2	1.8	.5	.1	6.0

==== Playoffs ====
Year	Team	GP	GS	MPG	FG%	3P%	FT%	RPG	APG	SPG	BPG	PPG
1990	Cleveland	5	0	14.6	.286	.000	—	1.2	**2.0**	.8	.0	1.6
1992	Cleveland	12	**3**	12.4	.439	.273	**1.000**	.5	.8	.4	.0	3.7
1994	Chicago	10	0	18.6	.361	.375	**1.000**	**1.4**	1.0	.7	.0	3.5
1995	Chicago	10	0	19.3	.475	.421	**1.000**	.6	1.5	.1	.0	5.1
1996†	Chicago	18	0	**19.8**	.448	.321	.871	1.0	1.7	.8	.0	6.1
1997†	Chicago	19	0	17.9	.429	.381	.929	.9	1.1	**.9**	**.1**	5.1
1998†	Chicago	**21**	0	**19.8**	.434	.463	.818	.8	1.7	.3	.0	4.9
1999†	San Antonio	11	0	8.8	.267	.231	.833	.8	.7	.2	.0	2.2
2001	San Antonio	9	0	11.2	.480	.333	.500	1.0	.7	.4	**.1**	3.3
2002	Portland	3	0	13.0	.429	.250	**1.000**	1.3	1.7	.3	.0	**6.3**
2003†	San Antonio	10	0	4.6	**.636**	**.833**	.750	.3	.6	.1	.0	2.2
Career		128	3	15.6	.426	.370	.876	.9	1.2	.5	.0	4.3

=== College ===
Year	Team	GP	GS	MPG	FG%	3P%	FT%	RPG	APG	SPG	BPG	PPG
1983–84	Arizona	28	—	22.6	.516	—	.692	1.2	1.3	0.3	0.0	7.1
1984–85	Arizona	31	—	33.4	.568	—	.803	2.4	4.0	0.6	0.1	10.0
1985–86	Arizona	32	—	38.4	.540	—	.899	3.2	4.2	1.6	0.0	14.4
1986–87	Arizona	Redshirted—Did not play										
1987–88	Arizona	38	—	32.6	.559	.573	.824	2.0	3.9	1.2	0.1	12.6
Career		129	—	32.1	.548	.573	.815	2.2	3.4	1.0	0.1	11.2

== Head coaching record ==
=== NBA ===
Legend
Regular season	G	Games coached	W	Games won	L	Games lost	W–L %	Win–loss %
Playoffs	PG	Playoff games	PW	Playoff wins	PL	Playoff losses	PW–L %	Playoff win–loss %

‡	NBA record

Team	Year	G	W	L	W–L%	Finish	PG	PW	PL	PW–L%	Result
Golden State	2014–15	82	67	15	.817	1st in Pacific	21	16	5	.762	Won NBA championship
Golden State	2015–16	82	73‡	9	.890‡	1st in Pacific	24	15	9	.625	Lost in NBA Finals
Golden State	2016–17	82	67	15	.817	1st in Pacific	17	16	1	.941‡	Won NBA championship
Golden State	2017–18	82	58	24	.707	1st in Pacific	21	16	5	.762	Won NBA championship
Golden State	2018–19	82	57	25	.695	1st in Pacific	22	14	8	.636	Lost in NBA Finals
Golden State	2019–20	65	15	50	.231	5th in Pacific	—	—	—	—	Missed playoffs
Golden State	2020–21	72	39	33	.542	4th in Pacific	—	—	—	—	Missed playoffs
Golden State	2021–22	82	53	29	.646	2nd in Pacific	22	16	6	.727	Won NBA championship
Golden State	2022–23	82	44	38	.537	4th in Pacific	13	6	7	.462	Lost in conference semifinals
Golden State	2023–24	82	46	36	.561	5th in Pacific	—	—	—	—	Missed playoffs
Golden State	2024–25	82	48	34	.585	3rd in Pacific	12	5	7	.417	Lost in conference semifinals
Golden State	2025–26	82	37	45	.451	4th in Pacific	—	—	—	—	Missed playoffs
Career		957	604	353	.631		152	104	48	.684	

=== International ===
Team	Year	G	W	L	W–L%	Tournament	TG	TW	TL	TW–L%	Result
United States	2023	13	10	3	.769	World Cup	8	5	3	.625	4th place
United States	2024	11	11	0	1.000	Olympics	6	6	0	1.000	Won gold medal
Career		24	21	3	.875		14	11	3	.786	

== Awards and honors ==
NBA

- Nine-time NBA champion
  - Five as a player: 1996, 1997, 1998, 1999, 2003
  - Four as a head coach: 2015, 2017, 2018, 2022
- Two-time NBA 3-point field goal percentage leader: 1990, 1995
- 15 Greatest Coaches in NBA History selection
- NBA Coach of the Year: 2016
- Two-time NBA All-Star Game head coach: 2015, 2017
- NBA Three-Point Contest champion: 1997
- NBA All-Star Weekend Shooting Stars Competition winner: 2006

USA Basketball

- 1986 FIBA World Championship (as a player)
- Two-time Gold medal winner
  - Assistant coach of 2020 Olympic team
  - Head coach of 2024 Olympic team

NCAA

- No. 25 retired by the Arizona Wildcats

Media

- Three-time ESPY Award winner
  - 2015 Best Coach/Manager

Civic Honors

- 2025 - Received Key to the City of San Francisco

== Records ==
=== NBA ===
- Career 3-point field goal percentage (.454)

==== Chicago Bulls ====
- Single-season 3-point field goal percentage (.524, 1994–95)
- Career 3-point field goal percentage (.479)

==== Cleveland Cavaliers ====
- Single-season 3-point field goal percentage (.507, 1989–90)
- Career 3-point field goal percentage (.472)

=== NCAA ===
- Single-season 3-point field goal percentage (57.3%, 1987–88, min 100 made)

== See also ==
- List of NBA career 3-point field goal percentage leaders
- List of NBA players with most championships
