= Malcolm H. Kerr =

American political scientist and academic (1931–1984)

Malcolm Kerr
- Born: Malcolm Hooper Kerr; October 8, 1931; Beirut, Lebanon
- Died: January 18, 1984 (aged 52); Beirut, Lebanon
- Children: 4, including Steve
- Father: Stanley Kerr

Academic background
- Education: Princeton University (BA); American University of Beirut (MA); Johns Hopkins University (PhD)

Academic work
- Discipline: Middle Eastern studies
- Institutions: University of California, Los Angeles; American University of Beirut

Malcolm Hooper Kerr (October 8, 1931 – January 18, 1984) was a Lebanese-born American university professor specializing in the Middle East and the Arab world. He served as president of the American University of Beirut from 1982 until he was assassinated by gunmen in 1984.

== Early life and education ==
Kerr's youth was spent in Lebanon, on and near the campus of the American University of Beirut, where his parents taught for 40 years. His parents, Elsa Reckman and Stanley Kerr, were married in Marash, where they met while they were rescuing Armenian women and orphans after the Armenian genocide. After the Marash Affair they moved to Beirut. There his father became the chairman of the Department of Biochemistry at AUB and his mother was Dean of Women.

Kerr completed his secondary education in the United States, graduating from Deerfield Academy, a common destination for the sons of AUB families, in 1949. He proceeded to Princeton University, receiving a BA in political science in 1953. He then entered a masters program in Arabic studies, completing it in 1955 at the American University of Beirut. Here he met his wife, Ann Zwicker Kerr, with whom he had four children. He commenced his doctorate work in Washington, D.C., at the School for Advanced International Studies, Johns Hopkins University, where he received his Ph.D. in 1958. His dissertation was written under the guidance of Majid Khadduri and Sir Hamilton Gibb.

== Professor ==
In 1964–1965, an academic grant sent him to Cairo, where he worked on his most well-known book, The Arab Cold War, published in 1965. The next year he published Islamic Reform, a reworking of his doctorate dissertation. Following the 1967 Arab-Israeli War, Kerr sensed a drastic change for the worse in the tone of Arab politics, which became harsh and bitter. In 1970–1971, he accepted an academic grant to France and North Africa and worked on a third edition of The Arab Cold War. Kerr served as president of the Middle East Studies Association in 1972. Subsequently, an award of the Middle East Studies Association was named in his honor.

His own scholarship was forthright and honest to the point of sometimes getting him into trouble. While he was often thought of as 'pro-Arab' in writing about the Israeli-Arab conflict, he could be as critical of the Arabs as he was of the Israelis. He spoke the truth as he saw it and was committed to the cause of Arab-Israeli peace and to building understanding between the Arab World and the West."

== President of AUB ==
Although the civil war was still being fiercely battled on occasion, with the recent exit of the Palestine Liberation Organization, the Lebanese civil struggle for domestic change had been a more focused effort, which encouraged hope for resolution. "Betting on these chances and feeling a sense of calling to the job, the Kerrs decided to go to Beirut." He accepted the position, serving as president for 17 months. Appointed president in March, effective July 1, the Israeli invasion of Lebanon and occupation of Beirut made him work first from the New York office. He arrived at his College Hall office at the university in September 1982. On September 16, 1982, Kerr allowed Lebanese residents to use vacant buildings at the American University of Beirut in order to avoid the oncoming Israeli assault on West Beirut. When Israeli officers demanded that Kerr allow them to inspect the university for potential terrorists, Kerr refused. “There are no terrorists on the AUB campus,” he said. “If you're looking for terrorists, look in your own army for those who’ve destroyed Beirut.”

== Death ==
On 18 January 1984, in the midst of the Lebanese Civil War, Kerr was shot and killed by two gunmen. He was shot twice in the back of his head by gunmen using suppressed handguns in the hallway outside his office. The Islamic Jihad Organization, a militant organization close to Hezbollah, claimed responsibility for the assassination. However, decades later, information regarding Kerr's assassins and their motives still remains uncertain.

News of his murder appeared in the media worldwide.

The Kerr family sued the Iranian government under the Antiterrorism and Effective Death Penalty Act of 1996. Iran's government did not contest the suit, which resulted in a monetary judgement in favor of the Kerr family, although it was never actually paid to them. The lawsuit and the surrounding tragedy of his death are discussed in his daughter's memoir, One Family's Response to Terrorism by Susan Kerr van de Ven.

== Personal life ==
Kerr had four children, including Steve Kerr, a former NBA basketball player, broadcaster, and the current head coach of the Golden State Warriors. Steve Kerr was also the coach of the United States men's national basketball team at the 2024 Summer Olympics.

== Selected publications ==
- Malcolm H. Kerr, Lebanon in the Last Years of Feudalism 1840–1868. A contemporary account by Antun Dahir Al-Aqiqi (American University of Beirut 1959)
- Malcolm H. Kerr, The Arab Cold War. Gamel Abd al-Nasr and his Rivals, 1958–1970 (Oxford University 1965, 3d ed. 1975)
- Malcolm H. Kerr, Islamic Reform. The political and legal theories of Muhammad 'Abduh and Rashid Ridā (Princeton University 1966)
- Malcolm H. Kerr, The Elusive Peace in the Middle East (SUNY 1975)
- Abraham S. Becker, Bent Hudson, & Malcolm H. Kerr, editors, Economics and Politics of the Middle East (New York: Elsevier 1975)
- Malcolm H. Kerr and al-Sayyid Yasin, editors, Rich and Poor States in the Middle East. Egypt and the New Arab Order (Westview 1982)
- Samir Seikaly and Ramzi Ba'labakki, editors, Quest for Understanding. Arabic and Islamic studies in honor of Malcolm H. Kerr (American University of Beirut 1991)
