= Edward Johnstone =

Edward Johnstone may refer to:

- Edward Johnstone (physician) (1757–1851), English physician
- Ed Johnstone (born 1954), Canadian ice hockey player
- Edward Huggins Johnstone (1922–2013), American federal judge
- Edward Grahame Johnstone (1899–1946), British World War I flying ace

== See also ==
- Edward Johnston (disambiguation)
- Ted Johnstone, pseudonym of author David McDaniel
