= Stanley Kerr =

American physician (1894–1976)

- Born: Stanley Elphinstone Kerr; March 30, 1894; Hopewell, New Jersey, U.S.
- Died: December 14, 1976 (aged 82); Princeton, New Jersey, U.S.
- Occupations: Humanitarian, clinical biochemist, educator
- Relatives: Malcolm H. Kerr (son); Steve Kerr (grandson)

Stanley Elphinstone Kerr (March 30, 1894 – December 14, 1976) was an American humanitarian, clinical biochemist and educator.

== Life and career ==
Kerr was the son of a Presbyterian minister. A clinical biochemist at Walter Reed Hospital, he left the United States in 1919 to serve as a volunteer for Near East Relief, an American charity created to help the Armenians. Kerr began his service in Aleppo during an Armenian refugee crisis when many of the survivors of the Armenian genocide had escaped. He worked as a medical and sanitary officer who cared for the survivors of the march of refugees through the desert. He also worked to recover Armenian children from the Kurdish and Turkoman families into which they had been forced.

In 1921 Kerr and Elsa Reckman joined the staff of a Near East Relief orphanage for Armenian children at Nahr Ibrahim, Lebanon. One of the Armenian refugees was as a flower girl in their wedding in 1922. The orphanage was abandoned in 1923 due to a typhoid outbreak.

After Kerr earned his Ph.D. in biochemistry in 1925 from the University of Pennsylvania, he and Elsa returned to the Middle East where he accepted the position of chairman of the Department of Biochemistry at the American University of Beirut. Elsa Kerr also served on the AUB faculty as Dean of Women students. They had four children: Marion, Dorothy, Douglas, and Malcolm H. Kerr.

In 1965, following 40 years of faculty service, Kerr retired with the rank of Distinguished Professor. In recognition of his service, the Republic of Lebanon conferred upon him its Order of Merit and its National Order of the Cedar (Chevalier rank). He and Elsa retired to Princeton, New Jersey.

Kerr published The Lions of Marash in 1973. Some have deemed that book as "practically required reading for Armenians" since it is a firsthand account of the massacre of the Armenian population in Western Armenia.

Kerr died in 1976. He was the father of Malcolm H. Kerr, former president of the American University of Beirut, and the grandfather of NBA player, general manager, broadcaster, and coach Steve Kerr.
