= Edward A. Johnson (ecologist) =

Canadian ecologist

Edward A. Johnson is a Canadian ecologist. His research focuses on the contact between geosciences and ecology.

Johnson is currently Professor Emeritus in the Department of Biological Sciences at the University of Calgary, located in Alberta, Canada. He was formerly the director of the Biogeoscience Institute (BGI) at the university, which promotes research in the Canadian rockies and surrounding areas, where he is involved in research programs.

His research aims to incorporate the concept of natural disturbance into plant community organisation and dynamics. Johnson's applied interests include but are not limited to global climate change, conservation biology, and ecosystem and fire management.

Johnson is a member of the National Science Foundation (NSF) Community Surface Dynamics Modeling System, which is a national effort that aims to coordinate surface dynamic modelling of the Earth's surface. He is also a member of the Natural Sciences and Engineering Research Council (NSERC) Centres of Excellence in Sustainable Forest Management, NSERC Geomatics for Informed Decisions (GEOIDE), PAGSE (Royal Society of Canada), and he served as Editor-in-Chief of the journal Bulletin of the Ecological Society of America from 2004 to 2022.

Johnson has published 129 peer-reviewed scientific papers and four books related to his ecological research interests. His books include Fire and Vegetation Dynamics (1992), which examines fire dynamics in the North American boreal forest. He published Forest Fires: Behavior and Ecological Effects (2001). In 2005, he published Environmental Education and Advocacy, which discusses changing perspectives in ecology and education. In 2007, Johnson published Plant Disturbance Ecology: The Process and the Response.

Johnson received the 1986 W.S. Cooper Award from the Ecological Society of America. He was one of the inaugural Fellows of the Ecological Society of America in 2012.

== Bibliography ==
- Johnson, E.A. and S. Arlidge (eds.) 2024. Natural Science and Indigenous Knowledge: The Americas Experience.
- Johnson, E.A. and K. Miyanishi (eds.) 2007. Plant Disturbance Ecology: The Process and the Response. Academic Press, San Diego.
- Johnson, E. A. and M. J. Mappin (2005). Ecological education and environmental advocacy, Cambridge University Press.
- Johnson, E.A. and K. Miyanishi (eds.) 2001. Forest Fires: Behavior and Ecological Effects. Academic Press, San Diego.
- Johnson, E.A. 1992. Fire and Vegetation Dynamics. Cambridge University Press.
