= Edwin Johnson (Australian educator) =

Australian schoolteacher and civil servant

Edwin Johnson (1835–1894) was an Australian schoolteacher and civil servant. Born in Liverpool, England in 1835, he was apprenticed as a pupil-teacher at the age of 14 and in 1854 at the age of 19, accepted an offer of employment in New South Wales. Moving quickly through the ranks, he became headmaster of a Deniliquin model school in 1861 and inspector of schools in the Hunter River District in 1863.

Johnson advocated reforms to the education system including creative teaching methods rather than rote learning, the introduction of infant schools and residential teacher training colleges. In 1880, he became chief inspector of schools and, in 1884, he was made under-secretary of the Department of Education where he established school savings banks and the Public Schools Athletics Association.
