= Edward Johnston (priest) =

Anglican Dean of Waikato 1974–1978

Edward Alexander Johnston was the Dean of Waikato from 1974 until 1978.

Johnston was educated at the University of New Zealand, from where he graduated in 1952 with a thesis on religious education in state primary schools. He was ordained in 1957. After a curacy in Devonport, New Zealand he was Vicar of Hokianga from 1958 to 1962; and then of Paparoa from 1962 to 1966. He was Sub-Dean of Holy Trinity Cathedral, Auckland from 1966 to 1970; and Principal of Christ's College, Christchurch from 1970 until his appointment as Dean. Afterwards he was Ecumenical Chaplain to Christchurch Hospital, New Zealand from 1979 until his retirement.
