= Edward Johnston (artist) =

American computational artist and designer

Lucid Voxelations, installation view, Kean University VISER, 2025

Edward S. Johnston, also known professionally as Ed S. Johnston, is an American computational artist and designer whose creative practice examines how recorded experiences and the passage of time can be translated into spatial structures through moving image, spatial media, and digital fabrication. His recent Voxelations translate recorded image sequences into three-dimensional works presented through animation, digital fabrication, and immersive installation. Earlier work by Johnston was selected for the Lumen 50 in 2012 and included in the 2013 Lumen Prize international touring exhibition. His work has also been exhibited or presented through ACM SIGGRAPH, the CVPR and ECCV Art Galleries, ISEA, and the Generative Art Conference. Alongside his studio practice, Johnston conducts collaborative research in immersive media, experience design, and digital heritage. He is an associate professor in the Robert Busch School of Design at Kean University's Michael Graves College.

== Education and academic career ==
Johnston received an MFA from the University of Michigan, a Post-Baccalaureate Certificate in Fine Arts from the Maryland Institute College of Art, and M.Ed. and B.A. degrees from the University of Notre Dame. At Kean University, he has taught courses involving spatial media, interactive design and immersive experiences leveraging 3D modeling and animation, digital fabrication, and extended reality technologies.

== Creative work ==
Johnston's studio practice explores how recorded experience and temporal sequence can be translated into spatial form. Looking at Clouds—Variation 2 was exhibited in the 2009 ArcheTime: Cross-Disciplinary Conference and Exhibition on Time at The Tank Space for Performing and Visual Arts and later in The Matter of Time at the Philoctetes Center in New York. The work was subsequently included in ACM SIGGRAPH Digital Arts Community's 2012 juried online exhibition Environments – Natural – Constructed, selected for the Lumen 50 in 2012, and included in the 2013 Lumen Prize international touring exhibition, which traveled to London, Riga, Shanghai, and Hong Kong. In 2009, Johnston received a Young Artist Program (YAP) grant from the D.C. Commission on the Arts and Humanities, partly funded by the National Endowment for the Arts.

Johnston continued this time-based practice with works including At Forest's Edge, presented in the 2024 CVPR Art Gallery and at the 2024 Generative Art Conference, and Underpass Sky Voxelation, included in the 2025 CVPR Art Gallery. In 2025, he presented the solo exhibition Lucid Voxelations at Kean University's VISER, combining projected animations with corresponding 3D-printed forms. In 2026, the CVPR Art Gallery presented Cloud Passage and Through Branches from the series, and the ECCV Art Gallery selected Autumn Illumination.

== Immersive design and digital heritage ==
Alongside his studio practice, Johnston has conducted collaborative research in immersive media, experience design, and digital heritage. Working with Monmouth University professors Mike Richison and Marina Vujnovic and a larger collaborative team, Johnston co-directed Augmented Asbury Park, an augmented-reality project that digitally reconstructed former landmarks along the Asbury Park boardwalk. Johnston presented the project at the 2015 International Symposium on Electronic Art; the accompanying paper was co-authored with Richison and Vujnovic. The collaborators later contributed a chapter on the project's 3D content to the 2019 volume Der Modelle Tugend 2.0.

At Kean University, Johnston later co-directed Liberty Hall 360: Revolutionary Wedding with Emmanuel Vozos, a film and 360-degree virtual-reality production reconstructing the 1774 wedding of John Jay and Sarah Livingston at Liberty Hall. History honors students wrote the initial script after archival research. The production was developed collaboratively with history faculty Elizabeth Hyde and Jonathan Mercantini and Liberty Hall Museum staff William Schroh Jr. and Rachael Goldberg; Schroh also served as one of the historical research leads. The production received a Platinum Award in the Digital Video Creation: Virtual/Augmented/Mixed Reality category of the 2019 MarCom Awards. It also received a Viddy Platinum Award in the Virtual Reality category. In 2020, it was nominated in the Nostalgia Program category of the New York Emmy Awards, with Johnston credited as lead producer/director.

Johnston later led Liberty Hall Museum: Room of Echoes, a Kean research and design project that used interactive 3D media to show a room at Liberty Hall at different points in its history and to improve access to the space for visitors with mobility limitations. Fast Company named the project an honorable mention in the Learning category of its 2022 Innovation by Design Awards.
