= Edmund Johnson =

Australian rules footballer

Personal information
- Full name: Edmund Barrett Johnson
- Born: 9 March 1883; Melbourne, Victoria
- Died: 15 December 1955 (aged 72); Camberwell, Victoria

Playing career^{1}
Years	Club	Games (Goals)
1904	South Melbourne	1 (0)
- ^{1} Playing statistics correct to the end of 1904.

Edmund Barrett Johnson (9 March 1883 – 15 December 1955) was an Australian rules footballer who played with South Melbourne in the Victorian Football League (VFL).
