= J. Edward Johnson =

American lawyer

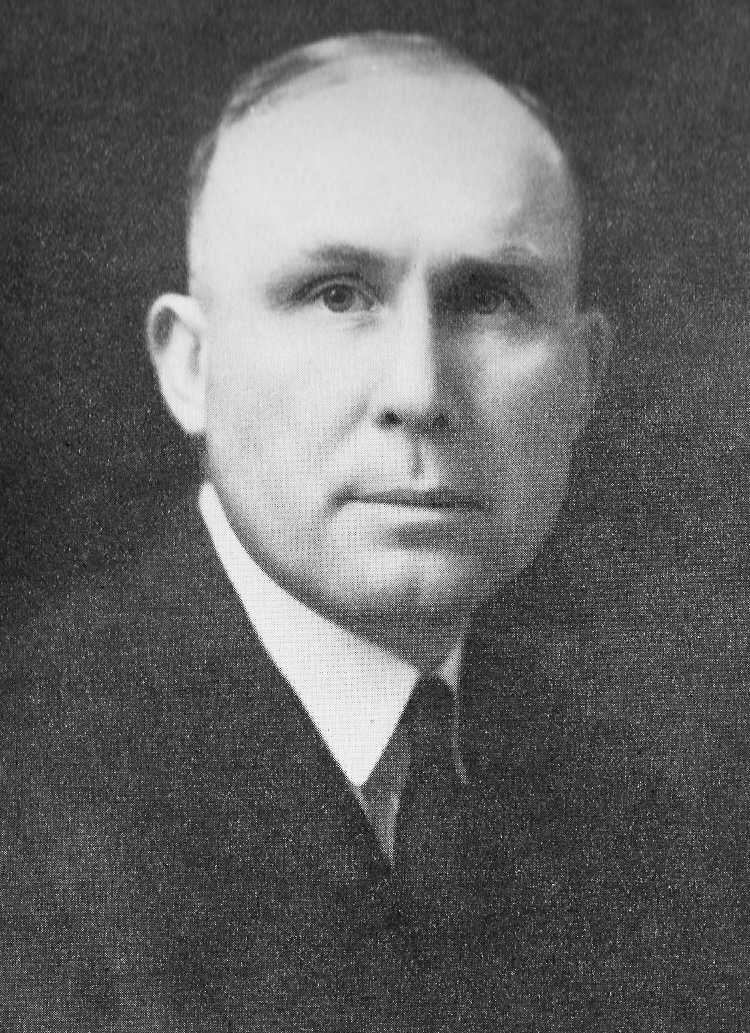
- Johnson ca. 1931
- Born: John Edward Johnson; 2 October 1890; Little Cottonwood, Murray, Utah Territory
- Died: 4 April 1976 (aged 85); El Cerrito, Contra Costa, California
- Resting place: El Cerrito, Contra Costa, California; Latitude: 31.6233, Longitude: -91.3586
- Other names: J. Ed Johnson
- Education: Brigham Young University (A.B., 1915); School of Jurisprudence, University of California at Berkeley (J.D., 1920)
- Known for: Attorney, historian, leader of the Church of Jesus Christ of Latter-day Saints in the San Francisco Bay Area
- Spouses: Mamie Huish (m. 1916; died 1933); LaVon Ethel Brockbank (m. 1934)
- Children: Robert H. (b. 1918); Marion H. (b. 1922); Carolyn H. (b. 1928); Thomas H. (b.1931); Cheryl B. (b. 1935); Yvonne B. (b. 1937); Richard B. (b. 1938); Harry B. (b. 1943)
- Parent(s): John Johnson (1864 –1943); Edla Lundell (1865 – 1941)

J. Edward Johnson (often J. Ed) was a lawyer and historian whose professional career was largely set in the East Bay area of California. He was also an early leader in the area of the Church of Jesus Christ of Latter-day Saints, serving as the first branch president of the Berkeley area and in two stake presidencies.

== Early life ==
J. Ed grew up on his father's farm and attended the high school associated with Brigham Young University, graduating in 1911, after which he took education courses, then securing employment as a teacher in Hinckley, Utah in 1912–1913. Deciding he wished to be a teacher, he returned to BYU to attain a bachelor's degree. During his final year of study, he served as student-body president.

He began his study of law at the University of California in 1917, receiving his Juris Doctor in 1920.

== Professional life ==
Johnson returned to Utah where he was admitted to the bar and practiced law in Provo, Utah and taught at BYU.

He returned to Berkeley in 1921 to become examiner of land titles for the Federal Land Bank. He was promoted to the land bank's attorney in 1922. He took on the additional role of attorney for the Federal Intermediate Credit Bank in 1922 when that federal agency was founded.

In 1926, he left those positions to be attorney for Pacific Coast Joint Stock Land Bank of San Francisco. In 1931 he entered into private practice.

== Church leadership ==
When the Berkeley Branch was founded in 1925, Johnson was released as a counselor in the Oakland Branch to be sustained as its president. When the San Francisco Stake was organized in 1927, he was sustained a first counselor, a role he continued in the Oakland Stake when it was organized by splitting the San Francisco Stake.

When the Church obtained a small lot next to the Berkeley ward building, the ward wished to convert it into a parking lot for members' use. Berkeley City Council was known to be reluctant when it came to such requests. Johnson attended a council meeting requesting a parking lat on behalf of the elderly members of the ward for whom the walk from street parking would be difficult. He then announced he did not count himself among those needing close parking and stood on his head, generating a positive reaction from the crowd and winning the ward its parking lot.

== Writings ==
Johnson wrote several works of history, largely of the law in California and his local Church community, most notably his two-volume history of the California Supreme Court covering the years 1849 to 1950. This history was completed under the auspices of the State Bar Committee on the History of Law in California and published by the Bancroft-Whitney Company.
