= Edward Johnson (actor) =

English actor

- Born: Hertfordshire, England, United Kingdom
- Spouse: Lisa

Edward Johnson is an English actor.

== Biography ==
Edward trained at the Central School of Speech and Drama. He has appeared in numerous stage roles including Jesus in Jesus Christ Superstar. He is a trained horseman. Edward keeps wolves at his home.

Edward lives in Hertfordshire with his wife and son, born 2009.

== Television work ==
- 2007: EastEnders
- The Bill

== Filmography ==
- 1998: Shakespeare in Love
- 2010: I of the Lost
