= 2006 Detroit Shock season =

- WNBA champions
- Head coach: Bill Laimbeer
- Arena: The Palace of Auburn Hills

Results
- Record: 23–11 (.676)
- Place: 2nd (Eastern)

The 2006 WNBA season was the ninth for the Detroit Shock. The Shock won the WNBA Finals for the second time in franchise history.

== Offseason ==
=== WNBA draft ===
Pick	Player	Nationality	School
17th	Ambrosia Anderson		
35th	Zane Teilane		

== Regular season ==
=== Season standings ===
Eastern Conference	W	L	PCT	GB	Home	Road	Conf.
z - Connecticut Sun	26	8	.765	–	14–3	12–5	15–5
x - Detroit Shock	23	11	.676	3.0	14–3	9–8	14–6
x - Indiana Fever	21	13	.618	5.0	12–5	9–8	12–8
x - Washington Mystics	18	16	.529	8.0	13–4	5–12	12–8
e - New York Liberty	11	23	.324	15.0	7–10	4–13	7–13
e - Charlotte Sting	11	23	.324	15.0	7–10	4–3	6–14
e - Chicago Sky	5	29	.147	21.0	3–14	2–15	4–16

=== Season schedule ===
Date	Opponent	Score	Result	Record
May 20	@ Indiana	60-67	Loss	0-1
May 24	Minnesota	78-69	Win	1-1
May 27	@ Connecticut	77-73	Win	2-1
June 1	New York	64-63	Win	3-1
June 3	@ Washington	68-92	Loss	3-2
June 4	@ Chicago	81-66	Win	4-2
June 7	@ Los Angeles	78-86	Loss	4-3
June 9	@ Phoenix	79-93	Loss	4-4
June 16	Indiana	71-63	Win	5-4
June 17	Houston	71-55	Win	6-4
June 22	@ Charlotte	86-74	Win	7-4
June 24	Washington	92-86	Win	8-4
June 25	Charlotte	71-61	Win	9-4
June 27	@ San Antonio	63-59	Win	10-4
June 29	@ Indiana	56-66	Loss	10-5
June 30	@ Connecticut	70-64	Win	11-5
July 6	Phoenix	76-91	Loss	11-6
July 7	@ Minnesota	92-80	Win	12-6
July 9	@ Houston	66-60	Win	13-6
July 16	San Antonio	77-67	Win	14-6
July 19	Charlotte	67-73	Loss	14-7
July 21	Los Angeles	73-59	Win	15-7
July 22	Chicago	89-70	Win	16-7
July 26	Sacramento	91-71	Win	17-7
July 28	@ Seattle	77-67	Win	18-7
July 30	@ Sacramento	61-94	Loss	18-8
August 1	Indiana	70-66	Win	19-8
August 3	@ New York	67-75	Loss	19-9
August 4	@ Chicago	76-49	Win	20-9
August 6	New York	65-53	Win	21-9
August 8	Seattle	79-81	Loss	21-10
August 10	Chicago	82-48	Win	22-10
August 11	@ Washington	66-78	Loss	22-11
August 13	Connecticut	88-65	Win	23-11
August 17 (first round, game 1)	@ Indiana	68-56	Win	1-0
August 19 (first round, game 2)	Indiana	98-83	Win	2-0
August 24 (conference finals, game 1)	Connecticut	70-59	Win	3-0
August 26 (conference finals, game 2)	@ Connecticut	68-77	Loss	3-1
August 27 (conference finals, game 3)	@ Connecticut	79-55	Win	4-1
August 30 (WNBA finals, game 1)	Sacramento	71-95	Loss	4-2
September 1 (WNBA finals, game 2)	Sacramento	73-63	Win	5-2
September 3 (WNBA finals, game 3)	@ Sacramento	69-89	Loss	5-3
September 6 (WNBA finals, game 4)	@ Sacramento	72-52	Win	6-3
September 9 (WNBA finals, game 5)	Sacramento	80-75	Win	7-3

== Player stats ==
Note: GP= Games played; FG = Field Goals; MIN= Minutes; REB= Rebounds; AST= Assists; STL = Steals; BLK = Blocks; PTS = Points

Player	GP	MIN	FG	REB	AST	STL	BLK	PTS
Deanna Nolan	34	1088	172	153	124	47	11	468
Cheryl Ford	32	920	157	363	45	38	25	443
Katie Smith								398
Swin Cash								358
Ruth Riley								249
Plenette Pierson								220
Kara Braxton								146
Kedra Holland-Corn								140
Angelina Williams								41
Jacqueline Batteast								36
Elaine Powell								14
Sabrina Palie								12
Irina Osipova	2	12	0	1	0	0	0	2

== Playoffs ==
Date time, TV	Rank^{#}	Opponent^{#}	Result	Record	High points	High rebounds	High assists	Site (attendance) city, state
2006 WNBA Playoffs|[[2006 WNBA Finals]]
August 17		Indiana Fever	W 68-56					
August 19		Indiana Fever	W 98-83					
*Non-conference game. ^{#}Rankings from AP Poll. (#) Tournament seedings in parentheses.

== Awards and honors ==
- Cheryl Ford, WNBA Peak Performer
- Deanna Nolan, WNBA Finals MVP Award
- Katie Smith, Named to WNBA All-Decade Team
