= Shameka Christon =

American basketball player (born 1982)

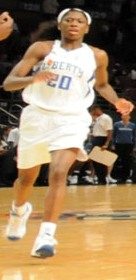

Personal information
- Born: February 15, 1982 (age 44) Hot Springs, Arkansas, U.S.
- Listed height: 6 ft 1 in (1.85 m)
- Listed weight: 170 lb (77 kg)

Career information
- High school: Hot Springs (Hot Springs, Arkansas)
- College: Arkansas (2000–2004)
- WNBA draft: 2004: 1st round, 5th overall pick
- Drafted by: New York Liberty
- Playing career: 2004–present
- Position: Small forward

Career history
- 2004–2009: New York Liberty
- 2010: Chicago Sky
- 2012–2014: San Antonio Stars
- 2015: Phoenix Mercury

Career highlights
- WNBA All-Star (2009); Third-team All-American – AP (2004); SEC Player of the Year (2004); First-team All-SEC (2004); SEC All-Freshman Team (2001)
- Stats at WNBA.com
- Stats at Basketball Reference
Medals
Women's basketball
Representing the United States
FIBA Under-19 World Cup
Bronze medal – third place	2001 Czech Republic	Team

Shameka Delynn Christon (born February 15, 1982) is an American retired professional women's basketball player who most recently played with the Phoenix Mercury in the WNBA.

She attended college at the University of Arkansas, and was named the Player Of The Year in the Southeastern Conference during her 2004 senior year. She graduated with a bachelor's degree in social work.

She was selected by the Liberty as the fifth overall pick in the 2004 WNBA draft.

Between WNBA seasons, she has played for two Israeli teams Elitzur Ramla and Raanana Hertzliya) and Spanish club Rivas Futura. Her teammates on the Spanish squad included then-fellow Liberty player Becky Hammon.

Christon was invited to the USA Basketball Women's National Team training camp in the fall of 2009. Christon was one of twenty players named to the national team pool. Twelve of this group will be chosen to represent the US in the 2010 World Championships and the 2012 Olympics.

In March 2010, Christon was traded to the Chicago Sky in a three-team, multi-player deal.

On February 8, 2012, Christon signed with the San Antonio Silver Stars.

On March 24, 2015, Christon signed with the Phoenix Mercury,

== Career statistics ==
Legend
GP	Games played	GS	Games started	MPG	Minutes per game	RPG	Rebounds per game
APG	Assists per game	SPG	Steals per game	BPG	Blocks per game	PPG	Points per game
TO	Turnovers per game	FG%	Field-goal percentage	3P%	3-point field-goal percentage	FT%	Free-throw percentage
**Bold**	Career best	°	League leader

=== Regular season ===
Year	Team	GP	GS	MPG	FG%	3P%	FT%	RPG	APG	SPG	BPG	TO	PPG
2004	New York	33	4	17.0	35.4	29.3	64.7	2.1	0.7	0.3	0.3	1.0	5.8
2005	New York	**34**	9	23.8	41.1	27.0	85.5	2.7	1.2	1.0	0.6	1.5	9.1
2006	New York	**34**	**34**	29.0	39.1	33.3	82.5	3.5	1.3	0.6	**1.2**	2.4	12.4
2007	New York	33	32	**32.3**	36.0	32.8	79.5	4.5	2.1	1.0	0.6	2.5	11.2
2008	New York	31	31	30.5	39.7	**40.6**	82.8	3.0	1.6	**1.1**	0.5	2.0	15.7
2009	New York	32	31	31.7	40.2	38.2	86.5	**4.9**	1.8	0.9	0.8	1.8	**16.1**
2010	Chicago	10	9	21.3	35.9	40.0	93.8	2.4	**2.4**	0.3	0.2	0.9	8.5
2012	San Antonio	**34**	31	20.4	35.8	34.2	78.1	2.0	1.3	0.5	0.5	0.6	7.9
2013	San Antonio	33	14	22.4	30.7	32.1	86.8	1.7	0.7	0.5	0.3	0.7	7.5
2014	San Antonio	31	0	10.9	35.5	30.9	80.0	1.3	0.2	0.2	0.1	**0.3**	3.6
2015	Phoenix	12	0	6.3	**42.9**	25.0	**100.0**	0.4	0.6	0.2	0.0	**0.3**	2.8
Career	11 years, 4 teams	317	195	23.5	37.6	34.2	82.2	2.7	1.2	0.6	0.5	1.3	9.6

=== Playoffs ===
Year	Team	GP	GS	MPG	FG%	3P%	FT%	RPG	APG	SPG	BPG	TO	PPG
2004	New York	5	0	12.6	38.1	42.9	66.7	1.8	0.8	0.4	**0.6**	0.6	5.6
2005	New York	2	1	23.5	33.3	50.0	50.0	2.5	0.5	0.0	0.5	1.0	5.5
2007	New York	3	3	**36.7**	44.1	50.0	88.9	**7.3**	**2.0**	**0.7**	0.0	1.3	**14.7**
2008	New York	**6**	**6**	32.7	41.1	44.4	71.4	4.3	0.5	**0.7**	0.3	2.0	13.7
2012	San Antonio	2	2	24.0	33.3	41.7	100.0	2.0	2.0	0.0	0.0	1.0	8.5
2014	San Antonio	1	0	4.0	0.0	0.0	0.0	0.0	0.0	0.0	0.0	**0.0**	0.0
2015	Phoenix	2	0	5.0	**100.0**	**100.0**	**100.0**	0.5	1.0	0.0	0.0	**0.0**	4.0
Career	7 years, 3 teams	21	12	22.8	41.1	45.7	75.7	3.2	1.0	0.4	0.3	1.1	9.0

=== College career statistics ===
Legend
GP	Games played	GS	Games started	MPG	Minutes per game
FG%	Field goal percentage	3P%	3-point field goal percentage	FT%	Free throw percentage
RPG	Rebounds per game	APG	Assists per game	SPG	Steals per game
BPG	Blocks per game	PPG	Points per game	**Bold**	Career high

Year	Team	GP	Points	FG%	3P%	FT%	RPG	APG	SPG	BPG	PPG
2000–01	Arkansas	**32**	327	40.5	32.7	**77.8**	4.1	0.6	1.5	0.9	10.2
2001–02	Arkansas	31	517	**47.2**	29.8	69.2	6.2	0.8	**2.0**	1.5	16.7
2002–03	Arkansas	**32**	496	44.5	35.8	68.6	6.1	1.5	1.6	1.1	15.5
2003–04	Arkansas	28	**611**	43.8	**36.4**	75.9	**7.0**	**1.7**	1.7	**1.6**	**21.8**
Career	Arkansas	123	1951	44.3	33.7	72.6	5.8	1.1	1.7	1.3	15.9

== USA Basketball ==
Christon was named to the USA Women's U19 team which represented the US in the 2001 U19 World's Championship, held in Brno, Czech Republic in July 2001. Christon scored 5.7 points per game, and helped the USA team to a 6–1 record and the bronze medal.

== Awards and achievements ==
- 2009 WNBA All-Star Selection
