= Cathrine Kraayeveld =

American basketball player (born 1981)

Personal information
- Born: September 30, 1981 (age 45) Bellevue, Washington, U.S.
- Listed height: 6 ft 3 in (1.91 m)
- Listed weight: 183 lb (83 kg)

Career information
- High school: Lake Washington (Kirkland, Washington)
- College: Oregon (2000–2005)
- WNBA draft: 2005: 3rd round, 27th overall pick
- Drafted by: San Antonio Silver Stars
- Playing career: 2005–2013
- Position: Forward

Career history
- 2005–2009: New York Liberty
- 2010–2011: Chicago Sky
- 2012: Atlanta Dream
- 2013: San Antonio Silver Stars

Career highlights
- All All Pac-10 Team (2005)
- Stats at WNBA.com
- Stats at Basketball Reference

Cathrine Helene Kraayeveld (born September 30, 1981) is a former American professional basketball player who played in the WNBA.

== High school and college ==
Kraayeveld attended Lake Washington High School in Kirkland, Washington and Bellevue Christian High School in Bellevue, Washington.

For college, Kraayeveld attended and played for the University of Oregon where she majored in Human and Family Services.

== Professional career ==
Kraayeveld was drafted in the third round, then cut by the San Antonio Silver Stars in 2005. Midway through the 2005 season she was picked up by the New York Liberty. In 2007 Kraayeveld finished 8th in the league with a .411 3-point FG percentage.

Kraayeveld was traded in 2010 to the Sky as part of a three-team trade.

== Career statistics ==
Legend
GP	Games played	GS	Games started	MPG	Minutes per game	RPG	Rebounds per game
APG	Assists per game	SPG	Steals per game	BPG	Blocks per game	PPG	Points per game
TO	Turnovers per game	FG%	Field-goal percentage	3P%	3-point field-goal percentage	FT%	Free-throw percentage
**Bold**	Career best	°	League leader

=== WNBA ===
==== Regular season ====
WNBA regular season statistics
Year	Team	GP	GS	MPG	FG%	3P%	FT%	RPG	APG	SPG	BPG	TO	PPG
2005	New York	17	0	11.5	41.8	37.5	**93.3**	1.6	0.3	0.2	0.5	1.0	4.1
2006	New York	34	13	26.6	**44.4**	33.3	76.4	4.6	0.9	0.5	0.4	1.8	8.8
2007	New York	34	**34**	**28.4**	43.3	41.1	78.6	4.5	**1.5**	**0.9**	0.6	2.5	**10.8**
2008	New York	34	**34**	28.3	38.3	37.6	70.6	**6.1**	1.4	0.8	**0.8**	1.6	9.6
2009	New York	34	26	26.1	39.8	**41.7**	75.5	4.6	0.9	0.6	0.4	1.9	9.0
2010	Chicago	34	14	21.2	35.0	31.6	87.5	2.7	1.3	0.6	0.6	1.4	5.2
2011	Chicago	33	15	20.6	39.5	40.9	73.3	2.6	1.2	0.6	0.2	1.2	5.9
2012	Atlanta	33	1	15.4	42.1	40.2	33.3	2.8	0.8	0.4	0.5	0.8	4.6
2013	San Antonio	22	0	13.0	29.1	27.5	75.0	1.9	0.5	0.4	0.2	**0.5**	2.1
**Career**	9 years, 4 teams	275	137	22.2	40.1	37.9	75.2	3.7	1.1	0.6	0.5	1.5	7.0

==== Playoffs ====
WNBA playoff statistics
Year	Team	GP	GS	MPG	FG%	3P%	FT%	RPG	APG	SPG	BPG	TO	PPG
2005	New York	2	0	18.5	33.3	**100.0**	83.3	3.5	0.0	0.0	0.0	1.0	4.0
2007	New York	3	3	29.0	42.4	41.7	**100.0**	6.0	0.7	0.7	**1.0**	1.3	**12.7**
2008	New York	**6**	**6**	**33.7**	35.6	34.5	50.0	**7.5**	**2.8**	0.7	0.5	1.7	7.3
2012	Atlanta	3	0	6.3	**100.0**	100.0	—	1.0	0.3	0.0	0.3	**0.3**	1.0
**Career**	4 years, 2 teams	14	9	24.6	39.0	39.5	80.0	5.2	1.4	0.4	0.5	1.2	6.6

=== College ===
College statistics
Year	Team	GP	Points	FG%	3P%	FT%	RPG	APG	SPG	BPG	PPG
2000–01	Oregon	24	50	32.6	33.3	**81.0**	1.7	0.4	0.3	0.2	2.1
2001–02	Oregon	**35**	356	**51.1**	37.0	74.2	8.3	1.7	1.1	1.2	10.2
2002–03	Oregon	15	217	47.1	41.5	67.9	**10.1**	1.6	0.9	**2.1**	14.5
2003–04	Oregon	5	86	48.5	**45.8**	78.6	8.6	**2.2**	0.8	3.2	**17.2**
2004–05	Oregon	30	**442**	45.5	36.4	76.9	8.3	1.8	**1.2**	1.2	14.7
**Career**		109	1151	47.0	38.4	74.8	7.1	1.4	0.9	1.2	10.6

== Personal life ==
Kraayeveld's father, Dave, played football for the Seattle Seahawks.
