= Loree Moore =

American basketball player (born 1983)

Personal information
- Born: March 21, 1983 (age 43) Carson, California, U.S.
- Listed height: 5 ft 9 in (1.75 m)
- Listed weight: 165 lb (75 kg)

Career information
- High school: Narbonne (Harbor City, California)
- College: Tennessee (2001–2005)
- WNBA draft: 2005: 1st round, 10th overall pick
- Drafted by: New York Liberty
- Playing career: 2005–2009
- Position: Point guard

Career history
- 2005–2009: New York Liberty

Career highlights
- WNBA All-Defensive Second Team (2007); SEC All-Freshman Team (2002)
- Stats at Basketball Reference
Medals
Women's basketball
Representing the United States
Pan American Games
Silver medal – second place	2003 Santo Domingo	Team
FIBA Under-19 World Cup
Bronze medal – third place	2001 Czech Republic	Team
FIBA Under-18 Americas Championship
Gold medal – first place	2000 Argentina	Team

Loree Marlowe Moore (born March 21, 1983) is an American former professional basketball player for the New York Liberty in the WNBA.

== Early life and education ==
Born in Carson, California, Moore graduated from Narbonne High School in Harbor City, California. Moore was named a WBCA All-American. She participated in the 2001 WBCA High School All-America Game, where she scored eight points, and earned MVP honors. She is the younger sister of former Major League Baseball player, Brian Hunter.

She attended the University of Tennessee, and played under Hall of Fame coach, Pat Summitt.

== Professional career ==
=== WNBA ===
Moore was selected as the tenth overall pick in the 2005 WNBA draft.

Moore started at the point guard position for the Liberty and wore jersey number 21. She has also played professional basketball in Turkey and Russia.

=== European career ===
- 2006–2007: (Turkey) Galatasaray
- 2007–2009: (Russia) Chevakata Vologda

== USA Basketball ==
Moore was a member of the USA Women's U18 team which won the gold medal at the FIBA Americas Championship in Mar Del Plata, Argentina. The event was held in July 2000, when the USA team defeated Cuba to win the championship. Moore averaged 6.0 points per game in her three games.

Moore was named to the USA Women's U19 team which represented the USA in the 2001 U19 World's Championship, held in Brno, Czech Republic in July 2001. Moore scored 3.1 points per game, and helped the USA team to a 6–1 record and the bronze medal.

Moore was named to the team representing the USA at the 2003 Pan American Games. The team lost the opening game to Cuba, then rebounded to win their next five games, including an overtime win against Brazil. They won a close game against Canada, 56–53, helped by a game saving steal by Moore with seconds left in the game. They then faced Cuba for the gold medal, falling short 75–64 to take home the silver medal. Moore averaged 6.4 points per game.

== Career statistics ==
Legend
GP	Games played	GS	Games started	MPG	Minutes per game	RPG	Rebounds per game
APG	Assists per game	SPG	Steals per game	BPG	Blocks per game	PPG	Points per game
TO	Turnovers per game	FG%	Field-goal percentage	3P%	3-point field-goal percentage	FT%	Free-throw percentage
**Bold**	Career best	°	League leader

=== WNBA ===
==== Regular season ====
WNBA regular season statistics
Year	Team	GP	GS	MPG	FG%	3P%	FT%	RPG	APG	SPG	BPG	TO	PPG
2005	New York	24	0	8.2	39.1	0.0	44.4	1.1	0.8	0.4	0.0	**1.0**	0.9
2006	New York	**34**	29	28.0	33.8	36.5	72.5	**4.2**	3.6	1.8	**0.3**	1.9	6.1
2007	New York	**34**	**33**	**34.2**	**41.2**	**40.7**	58.6	4.1	**4.8**	**2.2**	0.1	2.9	**9.6**
2008	New York	29	29	27.9	34.2	28.9	**83.3**	3.9	4.6	1.5	0.1	2.7	5.3
2009	New York	**34**	32	27.7	33.5	26.0	68.8	3.7	3.9	1.9	0.1	2.3	6.3
**Career**	5 years, 1 team	155	123	26.2	36.3	33.7	67.4	3.5	3.7	1.7	0.1	2.2	6.0

==== Playoffs ====
WNBA playoff statistics
Year	Team	GP	GS	MPG	FG%	3P%	FT%	RPG	APG	SPG	BPG	TO	PPG
2005	New York	1	0	1.0	0.0	0.0	0.0	0.0	0.0	0.0	0.0	**0.0**	0.0
2007	New York	3	3	**37.7**	**37.5**	29.4	**50.0**	**5.0**	**5.0**	**2.0**	0.0	2.0	**10.3**
2008	New York	**6**	**6**	29.7	31.3	**39.1**	**50.0**	3.5	4.2	1.5	0.0	1.8	7.2
**Career**	3 years, 1 team	10	9	29.2	33.8	35.0	50.0	3.6	4.0	1.5	0.0	1.7	7.4

=== College ===
NCAA statistics
Year	Team	GP	Points	FG%	3P%	FT%	RPG	APG	SPG	BPG	PPG
2001-02	Tennessee	34	194	46.7	32.1	69.4	2.7	**3.9**	2.4	**0.2**	5.7
2002-03	Tennessee	**38**	**244**	**47.0**	**39.3**	61.2	3.4	3.8	2.6	0.1	6.4
2003-04	Tennessee	17	135	46.0	30.3	52.9	**5.5**	2.8	**2.8**	0.1	**7.9**
2004-05	Tennessee	29	148	33.7	31.0	**74.2**	4.6	3.3	1.9	0.1	5.1
**Career**		118	721	43.3	34.1	66.0	3.8	3.6	2.4	0.1	6.1
