= Laurie Koehn =

American basketball player (born 1982)

Washington State Cougars
- Position: Assistant coach
- League: Pac-12 Conference

Personal information
- Born: May 13, 1982 (age 44) Newton, Kansas
- Listed height: 5 ft 8 in (1.73 m)
- Listed weight: 145 lb (66 kg)

Career information
- High school: Moundridge (Moundridge, Kansas)
- College: Kansas State (2001–2005)
- WNBA draft: 2005: undrafted
- Playing career: 2005–2012
- Coaching career: 2015–present

Career history

Playing
- 2005–2008: Washington Mystics
- 2008–2009: Panküp TED Kayseri Kolejliler
- 2010–2011: UTEX ROW Rybnik
- 2011–2012: Matizol Lider Pruszków
- 2012: Atlanta Dream

Coaching
- 2015–2018: Northern Colorado (asst.)
- 2018–present: Washington State (asst.)

Career highlights
- WNBA Three-Point Shootout champion (2007)
- Stats at WNBA.com
- Stats at Basketball Reference
Medals
Representing United States
Pan American
Silver medal – second place	2003 Santo Domingo	Team
FIBA Under-18 Americas Championship
Gold medal – first place	2000 Argentina	Team

Laurie Koehn (born May 13, 1982) is a former professional basketball player, who is currently the associate coach for the Washington State Cougars women's basketball team.

== Education ==
Born in Newton, Kansas, Koehn attended Moundridge High School in Moundridge, Kansas. Koehn graduated from Kansas State University in 2005. While at K-state, Koehn achieved the All-Big 12 Second Team (2005, 2004), CoSIDA Academic All-American (2004), Big 12 All-Academic First Team (2005), Kansas State, Big 12 and NCAA all-time leader in three-pointers made (392). She once hit 132 out of 135 three-pointers in a 5-minute period. Over the course of her college career, she hit 392 three-pointers, making her the NCAA Division I record-holder for made three-point attempts (tied with Heather Butler), a record she held until it was surpassed by Kaleena Mosqueda-Lewis in 2015.

== Professional career ==
Koehn was signed as a free-agent with the Washington Mystics in 2005.

On April 30, 2009 Koehn signed a training camp contract with the Phoenix Mercury. On June 3, 2009, Koehn was waived along with 2 others.

Extending her professional career, Laurie played during the 2010–11 season for the "Utex Row", a women's basketball team in Poland. Unfortunately, the team ended the season ranked twelfth out of the 13 member league. Koehn, however, performed well playing in all 14 games, averaging 17.9 points per game and tallying up an average of 36.4 minutes of play per game.

== USA Basketball ==
Koehn was a member of the USA Women's U18 team which won the gold medal at the FIBA Americas Championship in Mar Del Plata, Argentina. The event was held in July 2000, when the USA team defeated Cuba to win the championship. Koehn started all five games and averaged 12.4 points per game, third highest behind Alana Beard and Diana Taurasi.

Koehn was named to the team representing the US at the 2003 Pan American Games. The team lost the opening game to Cuba, then rebounded to win their next five games, including an overtime win against Brazil. They then faced Cuba for the gold medal, falling short 75–64 to take home the silver medal. Koehn averaged 8.9 points per game while hitting 17 of 30 three-point attempts, to lead her team in made three-pointers and percentage.

== Coaching career ==
In July 2015, Laurie Koehn was named as an assistant coach for the University of Northern Colorado women's basketball team. In April 2018, Laurie Koehn was named as an associate head coach for the Washington State University women's basketball team.

== Career statistics ==
Legend
GP	Games played	GS	Games started	MPG	Minutes per game	RPG	Rebounds per game
APG	Assists per game	SPG	Steals per game	BPG	Blocks per game	PPG	Points per game
TO	Turnovers per game	FG%	Field-goal percentage	3P%	3-point field-goal percentage	FT%	Free-throw percentage
**Bold**	Career best	°	League leader

=== WNBA ===
==== Regular season ====
WNBA regular season statistics
Year	Team	GP	GS	MPG	FG%	3P%	FT%	RPG	APG	SPG	BPG	TO	PPG
2005	Washington	30	0	**7.6**	46.8	46.7	80.0	**0.4**	**0.3**	**0.1**	0.0	0.2	**3.8**
2006	Washington	**32**	0	4.7	**50.0**	**52.4**	75.0	**0.4**	**0.3**	**0.1**	**0.1**	0.2	2.2
2007	Washington	28	0	3.9	36.1	36.4	**100.0**	0.3	0.2	0.0	0.0	**0.1**	1.4
2008	Washington	30	0	4.8	39.3	41.8	0.0	**0.4**	0.1	0.0	0.0	0.3	2.4
2009	Did not play (waived)												
2010	Did not play												
2011	Did not play												
2012	Atlanta	23	0	4.9	34.1	33.3	—	**0.4**	0.1	**0.1**	0.0	0.3	1.8
**Career**	5 years, 2 teams	143	0	5.2	42.2	43.0	69.2	0.4	0.2	0.0	0.0	0.2	2.3

==== Playoffs ====
WNBA playoff statistics
Year	Team	GP	GS	MPG	FG%	3P%	FT%	RPG	APG	SPG	BPG	TO	PPG
2006	Washington	2	0	0.0	—	—	—	0.0	0.0	0.0	0.0	0.0	0.0
**Career**	1 year, 1 team	2	0	0.0	—	—	—	0.0	0.0	0.0	0.0	0.0	0.0

=== College ===
College statistics
Year	Team	GP	Points	FG%	3P%	FT%	RPG	APG	SPG	BPG	PPG
2001-02	Kansas State	**34**	**600**	45.1	42.2	89.5	**3.4**	**2.5**	1.1	0.1	**17.6**
2002-03	Kansas State	24	317	42.2	41.1	82.5	3.4	1.8	0.8	0.1	13.2
2003-04	Kansas State	31	419	**45.6**	**43.5**	86.7	2.4	1.3	0.7	0.0	13.5
2004-05	Kansas State	32	397	40.8	39.5	**90.0**	2.8	1.5	1.1	0.1	12.4
**Career**		121	1733	43.6	41.6	87.7	3.0	1.8	0.9	0.1	14.3
