= 2012 Atlanta Dream season =

- Head coach: M. Meadors (12-12); F. Williams (7-3)
- Arena: Philips Arena

Results
- Record: 19–15 (.559)
- Place: 3rd (Eastern)
- Playoff finish: Lost in Conference Semifinals

Media
- Television: FS-S, SSO; ESPN2, NBATV

The 2012 Atlanta Dream season was the 5th season for the Atlanta Dream of the Women's National Basketball Association, and their 5th season under head coach, Marynell Meadors.

== Transactions ==
=== WNBA draft ===
Round	Pick	Player	Nationality	School/team/country
2	14	Tiffany Hayes	United States	Connecticut
3	32	Isabelle Yacoubou (pick later voided)	France	France

=== Trades and Roster Changes ===
Date	Transaction
January 4, 2012	Extended Qualifying Offers to Courtney Paris, Armintie Herrington, Alison Bales, and Yelena Leuchanka
January 15, 2012	Cored Erika de Souza
January 31, 2012	Shalee Lehning announces her retirement from the WNBA
February 8, 2012	Signed Cathrine Kraayeveld
February 9, 2012	Signed Yelena Leuchanka
February 10, 2012	Signed Aneika Henry-Morello to a training-camp contract
February 14, 2012	Signed Laurie Koehn to training-camp contract
February 15, 2012	Signed Coco Miller and Courtney Paris to training-camp contracts
March 3, 2012	Signed Ketia Swanier
March 7, 2012	Signed Armintie Herrington
March 8, 2012	Signed Erika de Souza
April 6, 2012	Signed Romina Ciappina to a training-camp contract
April 13, 2012	Alison Bales announces her retirement from the WNBA
April 20, 2012	Signed Tiffany Hayes to a rookie-scale contract
April 20, 2012	Signed Chelsea Regins and Aishah Sutherland to training-camp contracts
April 25, 2012	Signed Brittany Johnson to a training-camp contract
May 8, 2012	Waived Romina Ciappina, Chelsea Regins, Brittany Johnson, and Aishah Sutherland
May 16, 2012	Waived Coco Miller
June 3, 2012	Waived Courtney Paris
June 4, 2012	Signed Jessica Moore
July 2, 2012	Waived Jessica Moore
July 5, 2012	Signed Jessica Moore to a 7-day contract
July 12, 2012	Signed Jessica Moore to a 2nd 7-day contract

== Roster ==
2013 Atlanta Dream roster
Players
Coaches

Pos.	No.	Nat.	Name	Height	Weight	From
F/C	14	(Brazil)	de Souza, Erika	6' 5" (1.96m)	190 lb (86kg)	Brazil
G	10	(United States)	Harding, Lindsey	5' 58" (3m)	139 lb (63kg)	Duke
G	15	(United States)	Hayes, Tiffany	5' 10" (1.78m)	155 lb (70kg)	Connecticut
F/C	13	(Jamaica)	Henry-Morello, Aneika	6' 4" (1.93m)	192 lb (87kg)	Florida
G	12	(United States)	Koehn, Laurie	5' 8" (1.73m)	145 lb (66kg)	Kansas State
F	33	(United States)	Kraayeveld, Cathrine	6' 3" (1.91m)	183 lb (83kg)	Oregon
C	11	(Belgium)	Leuchanka, Yelena	6' 5" (1.96m)	195 lb (88kg)	West Virginia
F	20	(Spain)	Lyttle, Sancho	6' 5" (1.96m)	175 lb (79kg)	Houston
G/F	35	(United States)	McCoughtry, Angel	6' 1" (1.85m)	173 lb (78kg)	Louisville
G	22	(United States)	Price, Armintie	5' 9" (1.75m)	132 lb (60kg)	Mississippi
G	8	(United States)	Swanier, Ketia	5' 7" (1.7m)	150 lb (68kg)	Connecticut

Head coach
(United States) Fred Williams (Boise State)
Assistant coaches
(United States) Joe Ciampi (Mansfield State)

Legend

- (C) Team captain
- (DP) Unsigned draft pick
- (FA) Free agent
- (S) Suspended
- Injured

=== Depth ===
Pos.	Starter	Bench
C	Erika de Souza	Yelena Leuchanka
PF	Sancho Lyttle	Aneika Henry
SF	Angel McCoughtry	Cathrine Kraayeveld; Tiffany Hayes
SG	Armintie Price	Laurie Koehn
PG	Lindsey Harding	Ketia Swanier

== Schedule ==
=== Preseason ===
2012 Preseason Schedule
Total: 1–0 (Home: 1–0; Road: 0–0)

Game	Date	Time (ET)	Opponent	TV	Score	High points	High rebounds	High assists	Location/Attendance	Record
1	Sat 5	2:00	Tulsa		91-89	Koehn (21)	Henry (9)	Harding (6)	Philips Arena; 4,340	1-0

=== Regular season ===
2012 Regular Season
Total: 19–15 (Home: 11–6; Road: 8–9)
May: 2–2 (Home: 2–1; Road: 0–1)

Game	Date	Time (ET)	Opponent	TV	Score	High points	High rebounds	High assists	Location/Attendance	Record
1	Sat 19	7:00	@ Indiana	SSO; FS-I	84-92	McCoughtry (26)	Lyttle (10)	Harding (6)	Bankers Life Fieldhouse; 9,403	0-1
2	Fri 25	7:30	New York	SSO	100-74	McCoughtry (23)	Leuchanka (7)	McCoughtry (7)	Philips Arena; 6,802	1-1
3	Sun 27	3:00	Indiana	SSO	62-78	McCoughtry (21)	Lyttle (9)	Price; Swanier (2)	Philips Arena; 7,282	1-2
4	Thu 31	7:00	Phoenix	SSO	81-65	Kraayeveld; Lyttle (12)	Kraayeveld (9)	Price (6)	Philips Arena; 4,887	2-2

June: 5–5 (Home: 3–3; Road: 2–2)

Game	Date	Time (ET)	Opponent	TV	Score	High points	High rebounds	High assists	Location/Attendance	Record
5	Sat 2	7:00	Chicago	SSO; CN100	92-94 (OT)	McCoughtry (33)	Lyttle; Price; Swanier (4)	Harding (6)	Philips Arena; 4,503	2-3
6	Tue 5	7:00	@ New York		72-79	McCoughtry (21)	McCoughtry (14)	Price (4)	Prudential Center; 4,823	2-4
7	Fri 8	7:30	San Antonio	SSO	60-57	McCoughtry (16)	Lyttle (9)	McCoughtry (5)	Philips Arena; 4,501	3-4
8	Sun 10	5:00	@ Connecticut	CPTV-S	73-92	McCoughtry (23)	Lyttle (8)	Harding (5)	Mohegan Sun Arena; 6,526	3-5
9	Fri 15	7:30	Los Angeles	SSO	92-59	McCoughtry (31)	Henry (9)	Harding (6)	Philips Arena; 8,872	4-5
10	Sun 17	3:00	Connecticut	SSO	73-75	Price (20)	Lyttle (9)	Price (6)	Philips Arena; 4,323	4-6
11	Tue 19	7:00	New York	FS-S	60-73	Harding; Lyttle (13)	Lyttle (13)	Price (5)	Philips Arena; 4,134	4-7
12	Sun 24	4:00	@ New York	MSG	74-64	McCoughtry (23)	McCoughtry (8)	Swanier (9)	Prudential Center; 6,754	5-7
13	Tue 26	12:00	Indiana	SSO	70-58	McCoughtry (22)	Kraayeveld (10)	Harding (5)	Philips Arena; 8,388	6-7
14	Fri 29	8:00	@ Tulsa		102-92	McCoughtry (24)	Lyttle (8)	Harding (7)	BOK Center; 4,235	7-7

July: 2–3 (Home: 0–0; Road: 2–3)

Game	Date	Time (ET)	Opponent	TV	Score	High points	High rebounds	High assists	Location/Attendance	Record
15	Sun 1	6:00	@ Chicago	CN100	69-71	McCoughtry (21)	Lyttle (7)	Harding; Hayes (3)	Allstate Arena; 6,093	7-8
16	Sat 7	10:00	@ Phoenix		100-93 (2OT)	Lyttle (31)	Lyttle (10)	Swanier (5)	US Airways Center; 7,948	8-8
17	Sun 8	8:30	@ Los Angeles	NBATV; KDOC	63-79	Lyttle (17)	Henry (8)	Harding (5)	Staples Center; 11,019	8-9
18	Wed 11	3:00	@ Seattle		70-59	Lyttle (21)	Hayes (8)	Harding (5)	KeyArena; 9,686	9-9
19	Fri 13	8:00	@ San Antonio	SSO; FS-SW	70-91	Lyttle (21)	Lyttle (12)	Harding (6)	AT&T Center; 13,426	9-10
Summer Olympic break

August: 4–3 (Home: 2–2; Road: 2–1)

Game	Date	Time (ET)	Opponent	TV	Score	High points	High rebounds	High assists	Location/Attendance	Record
Summer Olympic break
20	Fri 17	8:30	@ Chicago	CN100	82-76	McCoughtry (25)	McCoughtry (8)	Lyttle (7)	Allstate Arena; 5,593	10-10
21	Sat 18	7:00	@ Indiana	NBATV; SSO; FS-I	72-86	McCoughtry (22)	de Souza; Price (6)	3 players (2)	Bankers Life Fieldhouse; 9,302	10-11
22	Wed 22	7:00	Chicago	NBATV; FS-S; CN100	82-71	Lyttle (24)	Kraayveld; Lyttle (7)	Hayes; Swanier; Lyttle (5)	Philips Arena; 4,010	11-11
23	Fri 24	7:00	@ Washington	NBATV; CSN-MA	81-69	Price (19)	de Souza (8)	Harding; Hayes (5)	Verizon Center; 9,697	12-11
24	Sat 25	7:00	Minnesota	ESPN2	74-84	Lyttle; McCoughtry (14)	Lyttle (9)	Harding (9)	Philips Arena; 7,224	12-12
25	Tue 28	7:00	Tulsa	FS-S	80-84	de Souza 16	de Souza; Lyttle (9)	Harding (7)	Philips Arena; 2,813	12-13
26	Thu 30	7:00	Washington	SSO	82-59	de Souza (21)	de Souza (10)	Harding (5)	Philips Arena; 3,381	13-13

September: 6–2 (Home: 4–0; Road: 2–2)

Game	Date	Time (ET)	Opponent	TV	Score	High points	High rebounds	High assists	Location/Attendance	Record
27	Sun 2	3:00	Connecticut	NBATV; SSO	87-80	McCoughtry (24)	Lyttle (13)	Lyttle; Hayes; Harding (4)	Philips Arena; 5,020	14-13
28	Wed 5	7:00	Indiana	NBATV; FS-S; FS-I	71-64	Harding (20)	Lyttle (12)	Harding (3)	Philips Arena; 4,112	15-13
29	Fri 7	8:00	@ Minnesota	SSO	93-97	McCoughtry (30)	Lyttle (12)	Harding (7)	Target Center; 9,308	15-14
30	Sun 9	3:00	Washington	SSO	93-68	Price; Harding (15)	de Souza (10)	Harding (9)	Philips Arena; 6,898	16-14
31	Tue 11	7:00	Seattle	NBATV; FS-S	77-61	McCoughtry (23)	de Souza (8)	Hayes; Harding (5)	Philips Arena; 5,558	17-14
32	Fri 14	7:00	@ Washington		82-74	McCoughtry (26)	de Souza (8)	McCoughtry (8)	Verizon Center; 7,368	18-14
33	Thu 20	8:00	@ Chicago		75-66	McCoughtry (21)	de Souza (10)	Harding (8)	Allstate Arena; 4,188	19-14
34	Sun 23	5:00	@ Connecticut	CPTV-S	72-92	Harding (16)	Hayes (9)	McCoughtry; Harding; Hayes (3)	Mohegan Sun Arena; 9,143	19-15

All games are viewable on WNBA LiveAccess or ESPN3.com

=== Playoffs ===
2012 Playoffs Schedule
Eastern Conference Semifinals vs. Indiana (Lost Series 1-2)

Game	Date	Time (ET)	Opponent	TV	Score	High points	High rebounds	High assists	Location/Attendance	Series
1	September 28	7:00	@ Indiana	ESPN2	75-66	Harding (23)	Lyttle; McCoughtry (9)	Harding (7)	Bankers Life Fieldhouse; 7,776	1-0
2	September 30	4:00	Indiana	ESPN	88-103	McCoughtry (22)	de Souza (9)	Harding (6)	Philips Arena; 6,890	1-1
3	October 2	7:00	@ Indiana	NBATV	64-75	Harding (17)	de Souza; Harding (7)	Price (4)	Bankers Life Fieldhouse; 6,840	1-2

== Standings ==
Eastern Conference	W	L	PCT	GB	Home	Road	Conf.
Connecticut Sun ^{y}	25	9	.735	–	12–5	13–4	18–4
Indiana Fever ^{x}	22	12	.647	3.0	13–4	9–8	15–7
Atlanta Dream ^{x}	19	15	.559	6.0	11–6	8–9	12–10
New York Liberty ^{x}	15	19	.441	10.0	9–8	6–11	10–12
Chicago Sky ^{o}	14	20	.412	11.0	7–10	7–10	8–14
Washington Mystics ^{o}	5	29	.147	20.0	4–13	1–16	3–19

== Playoffs ==
**Conference semifinals** Best-of-3
E1	**Connecticut**	2
E4	New York	0
**Eastern Conference**
E2	**Indiana**	2
E3	Atlanta	1
W1	**Minnesota**	2
W4	Seattle	1
**Western Conference**
W2	**Los Angeles**	2
W3	San Antonio	0

**Conference finals** Best-of-3
E1	Connecticut	1
E2	**Indiana**	2
W1	**Minnesota**	2
W2	Los Angeles	0

**WNBA Finals**; Best-of-5
E2	**Indiana**	3
W1	Minnesota	1

- **Bold** – Series winner
- Italic – Team with home-court advantage

== Statistics ==
Legend
GP	Games played	GS	Games started	MPG	Minutes per game	RPG	Rebounds per game
APG	Assists per game	SPG	Steals per game	BPG	Blocks per game	PPG	Points per game
FG%	Field-goal percentage	3P%	3-point field-goal percentage	FT%	Free-throw percentage	TO	Turnovers per game
PF	Fouls per game		Team leader		League leader

=== Regular season ===
Player	GP	GS	MPG	FG%	3P%	FT%	RPG	APG	SPG	BPG	PPG
Angel McCoughtry	24	17	29.9	44.7	33.7	80.0	5.0	2.9	2.5	1.1	21.4
Sancho Lyttle	34	34	31.6	41.2	25.5	75.8	7.6	2.5	2.4	0.7	14.0
Lindsey Harding	34	32	30.6	42.5	24.1	81.8	2.8	4.5	1.4	0.2	12.3
Erika de Souza	15	15	29.9	52.3	0.0	69.6	8.2	1.6	1.3	1.5	11.6
Tiffany Hayes	34	17	23.1	39.0	27.3	78.6	3.1	2.1	0.8	0.4	8.6
Armintie Herrington	34	33	26.6	50.9	0.0	60.2	3.7	2.5	1.1	0.3	8.4
Aneika Henry	34	14	18.0	46.8	0.0	76.2	4.1	0.4	0.5	0.9	4.8
Cathrine Kraayeveld	33	1	15.4	42.1	40.2	33.3	2.8	0.8	0.4	0.5	4.6
Yelena Leuchanka	19	5	13.7	38.1	0.0	71.4	2.7	0.6	0.5	0.5	3.1
Ketia Swanier	34	2	11.4	31.7	16.7	73.1	1.4	1.9	0.4	0.0	2.2
Jessica Moore	8	0	5.4	66.7	0.0	75.0	1.3	0.0	0.0	0.0	1.9
Laurie Koehn	23	0	4.9	34.1	33.3	0.0	0.4	0.1	0.1	0.0	1.8
Courtney Paris	4	0	7.3	50.0	0.0	0.0	2.0	0.0	0.5	0.5	1.5

=== Playoffs ===
Player	GP	GS	MPG	FG%	3P%	FT%	RPG	APG	SPG	BPG	PPG
Lindsey Harding	3	3	38.0	42.6	25.0	88.9	4.7	5.3	2.7	0.3	19.0
Angel McCoughtry	3	3	33.3	41.2	25.0	81.8	5.7	3.3	2.3	1.3	18.0
Sancho Lyttle	3	3	34.3	36.2	0.0	75.0	7.0	0.7	3.0	0.7	12.3
Erika de Souza	3	3	29.7	41.4	0.0	100.0	6.3	0.3	0.7	0.7	8.7
Armintie Herrington	3	3	30.0	36.4	0.0	72.7	3.7	3.3	2.3	0.3	8.0
Tiffany Hayes	3	0	16.3	36.4	33.3	100.0	2.3	1.7	1.7	0.3	4.3
Aneika Henry	3	0	10.0	75.0	0.0	100.0	1.7	0.0	0.0	0.7	2.7
Ketia Swanier	2	0	3.0	66.7	50.0	0.0	0.0	0.0	0.0	0.0	2.5
Cathrine Kraayeveld	3	0	6.3	100.0	100.0	0.0	1.0	0.3	0.0	0.3	1.0

== Awards and honors ==
Recipient	Award	Date awarded	Ref.
Angel McCoughtry	Eastern Conference Player of the Week	July 2	
Sancho Lyttle	Eastern Conference Player of the Week	August 27	
Sancho Lyttle	All-Defensive First Team	September 28	
Lindsey Harding	Eastern Conference Player of the Week	September 10	
Armintie Price	All-Defensive Second Team	September 28	
Tiffany Hayes	WNBA All-Rookie Team	October 7	
