= Bellevue Christian School =

Coordinates: 47.6256°N 122.2107°W

Location
- 1701 98th Avenue Northeast; Clyde Hill, Washington; United States

Information
- Type: Independent
- Established: 1950
- Grades: Preschool-12
- Enrollment: 900
- Campus: Suburban
- Colors: Blue and White
- Mascot: Vikings
- Website: bellevuechristian.org
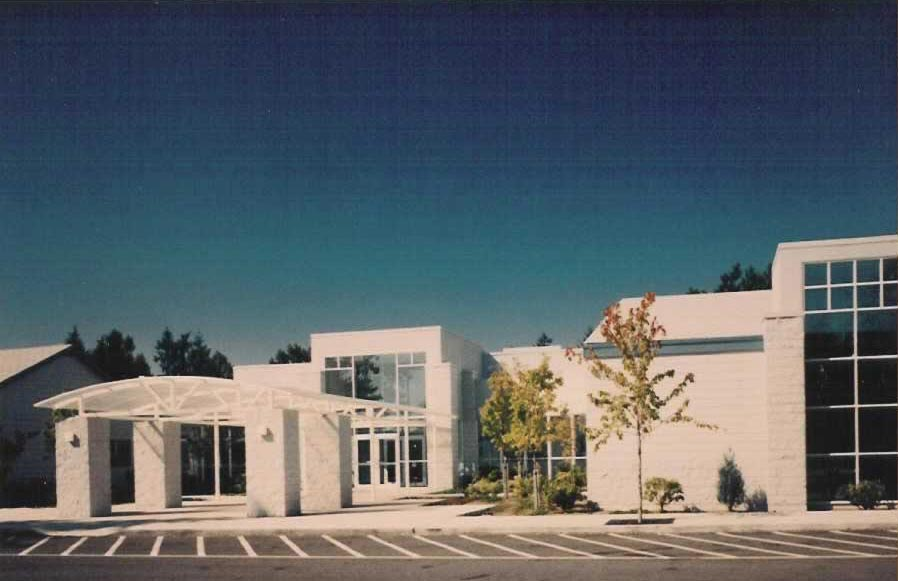

Bellevue Christian School (BCS) is a private, interdenominational Christian school serving grades K-12, located in Clyde Hill, Washington. BCS is a part of the Nisqually League, a high school athletic conference located in the greater Seattle area. The school was founded in 1950 by brothers Dr. Albert and Joseph Greene. Since its inception, the student population at Bellevue Christian School has grown from 9 students to over 900 students.

== Affiliation ==
Bellevue Christian School is an independent Christian school.

== History ==
Founded by brothers Albert and Joseph Greene in 1950, BCS has now has approximately 900 students on three campuses.

== Locations ==
- The Central Office, Junior High/Senior High campus is located in Clyde Hill.
- Three Points Campus Preschool and Elementary is nearby Medina.
- Mack Campus Preschool and Elementary is in Woodinville.

== Academics ==
Bellevue Christian School is approved by the State of Washington and accredited by Christian Schools International and the Northwest Association of Accredited Schools (NAAS).

The high school academic program includes AP classes in English, World History, U.S. History, Calculus (AB and BC), Statistics, Biology, Physics 1, Physics 2, Spanish, Computer Science, Photography, and Studio Art. BCS is noted for its music program, which includes three choirs and three bands, including a symphonic wind ensemble, jazz band, and select Choir.

== Co-Curricular Activities ==
BCS is a member of the Washington Interscholastic Athletic Association (WIAA) and participates in the Nisqually League. BCS offers 16 different high school varsity sports (9 boys, 7 girls) including baseball, basketball, cross country, football, golf, soccer, track, volleyball and wrestling.

At the junior high level, all sports are no-cut, ensuring all students have an opportunity to participate in the sport of their choice.

== Notable alumni ==
- Mark Arm, musician, member of grunge bands Green River and Mudhoney
- Sarah McIntyre, children's book writer, and illustrator
- Cathrine Kraayeveld, former WNBA basketball player. Attended Bellevue Christian School freshman and sophomore year before transferring.
- Hans Struzyna, Olympic rower who competed in the 2016 Summer Olympics.
