= Jenni Dant =

American basketball player (born 1982)

Personal information
- Born: December 17, 1982 (age 42) Lincolnshire, Illinois, U.S.
- Listed height: 5 ft 11 in (1.80 m)

Career information
- High school: Adlai Stevenson (Lincolnshire, Illinois)
- College: DePaul (2001–2005)
- WNBA draft: 2005: 3rd round, 28th overall pick
- Drafted by: Houston Comets
- Position: Guard

Career highlights
- CUSA All-Freshman Team (2002)
- Stats at Basketball Reference

Jenni Leigh Dant (born 17 December 1982 in Lincolnshire, Illinois) is a professional women's basketball player. She was a DePaul University Blue Demons basketball player from January 2002 until April 2005, and was drafted by the Houston Comets of the WNBA. She was released and went on to play in Europe. She is a graduate of Stevenson High School.

== DePaul statistics ==
Legend
| GP | Games played | GS | Games started | MPG | Minutes per game |
| FG% | Field goal percentage | 3P% | 3-point field goal percentage | FT% | Free throw percentage |
| RPG | Rebounds per game | APG | Assists per game | SPG | Steals per game |
| BPG | Blocks per game | PPG | Points per game | **Bold** | Career high |

| Year | Team | GP | Points | FG% | 3P% | FT% | RPG | APG | SPG | BPG | PPG |
|---|---|---|---|---|---|---|---|---|---|---|---|
| 2001–02 | DePaul | 29 | 293 | 37.8% | 33.3% | 77.4% | 3.7 | 2.0 | 1.9 | 0.1 | 10.1 |
| 2002–03 | DePaul | **32** | **460** | 40.7% | 33.0% | 72.6% | 3.5 | 2.3 | 1.9 | 0.2 | 14.4 |
| 2003–04 | DePaul | 30 | 424 | **42.6%** | 22.4% | **81.7%** | **4.1** | 2.9 | **2.9** | 0.1 | 14.1 |
| 2004–05 | DePaul | 31 | 456 | 41.0% | **37.1%** | 78.2% | 3.1 | **4.1** | 2.1 | **0.3** | **14.7** |
| Career | | 122 | 1633 | 40.8% | 31.6% | 76.9% | 3.6 | 2.8 | 2.2 | 0.2 | 13.4 |
