= Jonathan Kolb =

American basketball executive

New York Liberty
- Position: General Manager
- League: WNBA

Career information
- College: Arizona State

Career highlights
- WNBA Basketball Executive of the Year (2023)

Jonathan Kolb is an American basketball executive and the General Manager of the New York Liberty of the Women's National Basketball Association (WNBA). In 2023, he was named WNBA Basketball Executive of the Year.

Kolb was hired by the Liberty organization in March 2019, following its transfer of ownership to Joe Tsai and Clara Wu Tsai, and helped transition the team from Westchester to a new era in Brooklyn at the Barclays Center. Joining the team during their 2018–2020 slump, he helped improve the team and is credited with bringing it to a new level in their 2023 season by putting together an all-star team, resulting in the winningest year in franchise history (to that point), a WNBA Commissioner's Cup win, and its first appearance in the WNBA Finals since 2002. The team won its first franchise WNBA Championship in the 2024 WNBA Finals.

Ohemaa Nyanin, the inaugural GM of the Golden State Valkyries, was Kolb's first front office hire in 2019.

From 2014 to 2019, he worked for the WNBA in basketball strategy and operations. Kolb attended Arizona State University, where he earned his undergraduate and juris doctor (JD).
