= 2005 WNBA draft =

2005 meeting of WNBA teams to select players

General information
- Sport: Basketball
- Date: April 16, 2005
- Location: Secaucus, New Jersey
- Network: ESPN2

Overview
- League: WNBA
- First selection: Janel McCarville; Charlotte Sting

The WNBA Draft is an annual draft held by the Women's National Basketball Association (WNBA) through which WNBA teams can select new players from a talent pool of college and professional women's basketball players. The 2005 edition was the ninth in the WNBA's history.

2005 WNBA draft

- On April 16, 2005, the WNBA draft took place at the NBA Entertainment Studios in Secaucus, New Jersey.
- The first round of the draft was televised on ESPN2.

== Key ==
!	Denotes player who has been inducted to the Naismith Memorial Basketball Hall of Fame
^	Denotes player who has been inducted to the Women's Basketball Hall of Fame
^{+}	Denotes player who has been selected for at least one All-Star Game
^{#}	Denotes player who never played in the WNBA regular season or playoffs
**Bold**	Denotes player who won Rookie of the Year

== Draft ==
=== Round 1 ===
Pick	Player	Position	Nationality	Team	School / club team
1	Janel McCarville	C	United States	Charlotte Sting	Minnesota
2	Tan White	G	United States	Indiana Fever	Mississippi State
3	Sandora Irvin	F	United States	Phoenix Mercury	TCU
4	Kendra Wecker	F	United States	San Antonio Silver Stars	Kansas State
5	Sancho Lyttle ^{+}	C	Saint Vincent and the Grenadines	Houston Comets	Houston
6	**Temeka Johnson**	G	United States	Washington Mystics	LSU
7	Kara Braxton ^{+}	F	United States	Detroit Shock	Georgia
8	Katie Feenstra (traded to San Antonio)	C	United States	Connecticut Sun	Liberty
9	Kristin Haynie (Note: Haynie became the first person to play in the NCAA Women's Division I Basketball Championship game (with Michigan State) and the WNBA Finals (with the Sacramento Monarchs) in the same calendar year.)	G	United States	Sacramento Monarchs	Michigan State
10	Loree Moore	G	United States	New York Liberty	Tennessee
11	Kristen Mann	F	United States	Minnesota Lynx	UC Santa Barbara
12	Tanisha Wright	G	United States	Seattle Storm	Penn State
13	Dionnah Jackson ^{#}	F	United States	Detroit Shock (from Los Angeles via Washington)	Oklahoma

=== Round 2 ===
Pick	Player	Position	Nationality	Team	School / club team
14	Shyra Ely	F	United States	San Antonio Silver Stars	Tennessee
15	Roneeka Hodges	G	United States	Houston Comets	Florida State
16	Yolanda Paige	G	United States	Indiana Fever	West Virginia
17	Jacqueline Batteast	F	United States	Minnesota Lynx (from Charlotte)	Notre Dame
18	Angelina Williams	F	United States	Phoenix Mercury	Illinois
19	Erica Taylor ^{#}	G	United States	Washington Mystics	Louisiana Tech
20	Nikita Bell ^{#}	F/G	United States	Detroit Shock	North Carolina
21	Erin Phillips	G	Australia	Connecticut Sun	Adelaide Lightning (Australia)
22	Chelsea Newton	G	United States	Sacramento Monarchs	Rutgers
23	Tabitha Pool ^{#}	F	United States	New York Liberty	Michigan
24	Jessica Moore	C	United States	Charlotte Sting	Connecticut
25	Ashley Battle	F	United States	Seattle Storm	Connecticut
26	DeeDee Wheeler ^{#}	G	United States	Los Angeles Sparks	Arizona

=== Round 3 ===
Pick	Player	Position	Nationality	Team	School / club team
27	Cathrine Kraayeveld	F	United States	San Antonio Silver Stars	Oregon
28	Jenni Dant ^{#}	G	United States	Houston Comets	DePaul
29	Ashley Earley ^{#}	G/F	United States	Indiana Fever	Vanderbilt
30	Anne O'Neil ^{#}	G	United States	Sacramento Monarchs	Iowa State
31	Jamie Carey	G	United States	Phoenix Mercury	Texas
32	Tashia Morehead ^{#}	F	United States	Washington Mystics	Florida
33	Jenni Lingor ^{#}	G	United States	Detroit Shock	Southwest Missouri State
34	Megan Mahoney	F	United States	Connecticut Sun	Kansas State
35	Cisti Greenwalt	C	United States	Sacramento Monarchs	Texas Tech
36	Rebecca Richman ^{#}	C	United States	New York Liberty	Rutgers
37	Monique Bivins ^{#}	G	United States	Minnesota Lynx	Alabama
38	Steffanie Blackmon ^{#}	F	United States	Seattle Storm	Baylor
39	Heather Schreiber ^{#}	F	United States	Los Angeles Sparks	Texas

== See also ==
- List of first overall WNBA draft picks
