= 2004 New York Liberty season =

- Head coach: Richie Adubato; Pat Coyle (interim)
- Arena: Madison Square Garden, Radio City Music Hall (6 games)

Results
- Record: 18–16 (.529)
- Place: 2nd (Eastern)
- Playoff finish: Lost Conference Finals (2-0) to Connecticut Sun

The 2004 WNBA season was the eighth season for the New York Liberty.

== Dispersal Draft ==
Based on the Liberty's 2003 record, they would pick 4th in the Cleveland Rockers dispersal draft. The Liberty picked Ann Wauters.

== WNBA draft ==
Round	Pick	Player	Nationality	School/Club team
1	5	Shameka Christon (G/F)	United States	Arkansas
2	17	Amisha Carter (C)	United States	Louisiana Tech
3	30	Cathy Joens (G)	United States	George Washington

== Regular season ==
Heading into its eighth WNBA season, the club acquired veteran Ann Wauters in the dispersal draft and Shameka Christon in the college draft. The Liberty opened the season with a 6-1 record. Despite the strong start, Pat Coyle replaced Richie Adubato as head coach. Under Coyle’s guidance, the team registered an 11-6 mark and secured their sixth playoff appearance.

There were injuries to starters Ann Wauters and Tari Phillips. The Liberty played to a sellout crowd for six games at the historic Radio City Music Hall. At Radio City Music Hall, the Liberty posted a 5-1 record. The reason for the relocation was that Madison Square Garden was hosting the 2004 Republican National Convention. In addition, the Liberty hosted another unique game: The Game at Radio City, which featured the USA Women’s Olympic team vs. a WNBA Select Team.

=== Season standings ===
Eastern Conference	W	L	PCT	GB	Home	Road	Conf.
Connecticut Sun ^{x}	18	16	.529	–	10–7	8–9	14–6
New York Liberty ^{x}	18	16	.529	–	11–6	7–10	10–10
Detroit Shock ^{x}	17	17	.500	1.0	8–9	9–8	11–9
Washington Mystics ^{x}	17	17	.500	1.0	11–6	6–11	9–11
Charlotte Sting ^{o}	16	18	.471	2.0	10–7	6–11	8–12
Indiana Fever ^{o}	15	19	.441	3.0	10–7	5–12	8–12

=== Season schedule ===
Date	Opponent	Score	Result	Record
May 21	@ Indiana	67-69	Loss	0-1
May 23	Houston	68-62	Win	1-1
May 26	Detroit	64-52	Win	2-1
May 30	@ Minnesota	68-64	Win	3-1
June 1	@ Charlotte	63-53	Win	4-1
June 3	@ Houston	71-62	Win	5-1
June 5	@ San Antonio	62-57	Win	6-1
June 11	Indiana	68-72	Loss	6-2
June 13	@ Washington	60-62	Loss	6-3
June 15	Seattle	62-86	Loss	6-4
June 19	@ Indiana	65-70	Loss	6-5
June 22	Los Angeles	49-65	Loss	6-6
June 24	@ Phoenix	60-72	Loss	6-7
June 26	@ Seattle	67-62	Win	7-7
June 29	@ Los Angeles	65-69	Loss	7-8
July 1	@ Sacramento	47-73	Loss	7-9
July 6	Sacramento	73-66	Win	8-9
July 8	Washington	54-71	Loss	8-10
July 11	Phoenix	77-69	Win	9-10
July 15	Minnesota	66-69	Loss	9-11
July 18	Charlotte	75-58	Win	10-11
July 20	@ Charlotte	80-74	Win	11-11
July 24	Detroit*	78-69	Win	12-11
July 30	@ Detroit	79-88	Loss	12-12
July 31	Connecticut*	80-66	Win	13-12
September 2	Charlotte*	56-52	Win	14-12
September 3	@ Connecticut	43-61	Loss	14-13
September 9	@ Washington	59-71	Loss	14-14
September 10	Connecticut*	66-77	Loss	14-15
September 12	San Antonio*	64-62	Win	15-15
September 14	@ Detroit	71-82	Loss	15-16
September 16	Indiana*	77-71	Win	16-16
September 17	@ Connecticut	69-66	Win	17-16
September 19	Washington	79-75	Win	18-16

- All six home games held between July 24 and September 16 were held at the Radio City Music Hall, due to the Garden being used for the Republican National Convention.

== Player stats ==
Note: GP= Games played; REB= Rebounds; AST= Assists; STL = Steals; BLK = Blocks; PTS = Points

Player	GP	REB	AST	STL	BLK	PTS
Becky Hammon	34	118	150	58	2	460
Elena Baranova	34	246	67	37	58	394
Crystal Robinson	28	83	58	24	8	339
Vickie Johnson	34	121	124	25	4	321
Shameka Christon	33	68	23	9	9	191
Bethany Donaphin	26	71	16	11	8	131
La'Keshia Frett	16	40	14	9	5	102
Tari Phillips	13	70	16	14	10	87
Ann Wauters	13	40	21	4	8	82
DeTrina White	31	118	9	8	10	82
Erin Thorn	17	8	8	4	1	34
K.B. Sharp	30	21	33	6	1	29

== Playoffs ==
Game	Date	Opponent	Score	Result	Record
Eastern Conference Semifinals
1	September 24	@ Detroit	75-62	Win	1-0
2	September 26	Detroit	66-76	Loss	1-1
3	September 28	Detroit	66-64	Win	2-1
Eastern Conference Finals
1	October 1	Connecticut	51-61	Loss	2-2
2	October 3	@ Connecticut	57-60	Loss	2-3
