= 2009 New York Liberty season =

- Head coach: Pat Coyle (6-11); Anne Donovan (7-10)
- Arena: Madison Square Garden

Results
- Record: 13–21 (.382)
- Place: 7th (Eastern)
- Playoff finish: Did not qualify

Media
- Television: MSG Network

The 2009 WNBA season was the 13th season for the New York Liberty franchise of the Women's National Basketball Association. The Liberty attempted to advance to the WNBA Playoffs for the tenth time in thirteen seasons, but failed.

== Offseason ==
=== Dispersal Draft ===
Based on the Liberty's 2008 record, they would pick 8th in the Houston Comets dispersal draft. The Liberty waived their pick.

=== WNBA draft ===
The following are the Liberty's selections in the 2009 WNBA draft.

Round	Pick	Player	Nationality	School/Team/Country
1	8	Kia Vaughn	United States	Rutgers
2	21	Abby Waner	United States	Duke

=== Transactions ===
- June 4: The Liberty waived Jessica Davenport and Lisa Willis.
- May 29: The Liberty waived Abby Waner.
- May 5: The Liberty acquired Sidney Spencer from the Los Angeles Sparks in exchange for a first round 2010 WNBA Draft pick.
- January 12: The Liberty re-signed free agent Cathrine Kraayeveld.
- May 7, 2008: The Liberty traded their third-round pick in the 2009 WNBA Draft to the Phoenix Mercury as part of the Leilani Mitchell transaction.

Date	Trade	
May 7, 2008	To New York Liberty	To Phoenix Mercury
May 7, 2008	Leilani Mitchell	third-round pick in the 2009 WNBA Draft
May 5, 2009	To New York Liberty	To Los Angeles Sparks
May 5, 2009	Sidney Spencer	first-round pick in the 2010 WNBA Draft

=== Free agents ===
==== Additions ====
Player	Signed	Former team
Cathrine Kraayeveld	January 12, 2009	re-signed
Sidney Spencer	May 5, 2009	Los Angeles Sparks

==== Subtractions ====
Player	Left	New team
Erin Thorn	January 7, 2009	Chicago Sky
Abby Waner	May 29, 2009	free agent
Jessica Davenport	June 4, 2009	free agent
Lisa Willis	June 4, 2009	free agent

== Roster ==
2009 New York Liberty roster
Players
Coaches

Pos.	No.	Nat.	Name	Height	Weight	From
SF	22	(United States)	Battle, Ashley	6' 0" (1.83m)	170 lb (77kg)	Connecticut
G/F	17	(United States)	Carson, Essence	6' 0" (1.83m)	165 lb (75kg)	Rutgers
G/F	20	(United States)	Christon, Shameka	6' 1" (1.85m)	170 lb (77kg)	Arkansas
PF	3	(United States)	Jackson, Tiffany	6' 3" (1.91m)	185 lb (84kg)	Texas
PF	33	(United States)	Kraayeveld, Cathrine	6' 4" (1.93m)	180 lb (82kg)	Oregon
PF	2	(United States)	Larkins, Erlana	6' 1" (1.85m)	210 lb (95kg)	North Carolina
C	4	(United States)	McCarville, Janel	6' 2" (1.88m)	205 lb (93kg)	Minnesota
PG	23	(United States)	Mitchell, Leilani	5' 5" (1.65m)	130 lb (59kg)	Utah
PG	12	(United States)	Moore, Loree	5' 9" (1.75m)	169 lb (77kg)	Tennessee
G/F	6	(United States)	Spencer, Sidney	6' 3" (1.91m)	183 lb (83kg)	Tennessee
C	15	(United States)	Vaughn, Kia	6' 4" (1.93m)	200 lb (91kg)	Rutgers

Head coach
(United States) Anne Donovan (Old Dominion)
Assistant coaches
(United States) Laurie Byrd (Eastern Michigan)
Athletic trainer
(United States) Lisa White (Stony Brook)
Strength and conditioning coach
(United States) Lisa White (Stony Brook)

Legend

- (C) Team captain
- (DP) Unsigned draft pick
- (FA) Free agent
- (S) Suspended
- Injured

WNBA roster page

== Season standings ==
Eastern Conference	W	L	PCT	GB	Home	Road	Conf.
Indiana Fever ^{x}	22	12	.647	–	14–3	8–9	17–5
Atlanta Dream ^{x}	18	16	.529	4.0	12–5	6–11	10–12
Detroit Shock ^{x}	18	16	.529	4.0	11–6	7–10	11–11
Washington Mystics ^{x}	16	18	.471	6.0	11–6	5–12	10–12
Chicago Sky ^{o}	16	18	.471	6.0	12–5	4–13	10–12
Connecticut Sun ^{o}	16	18	.471	6.0	12–5	4–13	9–12
New York Liberty ^{o}	13	21	.382	9.0	8–9	5–12	8–13

^{x} =Clinched Playoff Spot
^{e} =Eliminated from playoff contention

== Schedule ==
=== Preseason ===
2009 Game Log: Preseason

Game	Date	Time (ET)	Opponent	Score	High points	High rebounds	High assists	Location/Attendance	Record
1	May 21	11:00am	Washington	77-71	Christon (12)	McCarville (5)	Carson (4)	Madison Square Garden; 15,958	1-0
2	May 22	7:00pm	@ Connecticut	62-74	Davenport (10)	Davenport, Jackson (5)	McCarville, Mitchell, Spencer (3)	Mohegan Sun Arena; 5,578	1-1
3	May 28	11:30am	@ Washington	56-74	Battle, Carson (9)	Vaughn (7)	Mitchell (2)	Verizon Center; 9,287	1-2

=== Regular season ===
2009 Game Log: Regular Season
June

Game	Date	Time (ET)	Opponent	TV	Score	High points	High rebounds	High assists	Location/Attendance	Record
1	June 7	4:00pm	Connecticut	WCTX	57-66	Christon (13)	Kraayeveld (7)	Battle, Mitchell (3)	Madison Square Garden; 13,397	0-1
2	June 10	10:00pm	@ Phoenix		84-91	Carson (18)	Kraayeveld, Vaughn (7)	McCarville (6)	US Airways Center; 5,080	0-2
3	June 13	8:00pm	@ San Antonio	NBA TV; MSG; KMYS	60-63	Christon (21)	McCarville (9)	McCarville, Moore (3)	AT&T Center; 10,572	0-3
4	June 19	7:30pm	San Antonio	NBA TV; MSG	77-61	McCarville (18)	Christon, Jackson, McCarville, Moore (6)	Christon (6)	Madison Square Garden; 8,046	1-3
5	June 21	3:00pm	@ Atlanta		93-81	Christon (17)	Moore (8)	Moore (8)	Philips Arena; 5,624	2-3
6	June 23	8:00pm	@ Minnesota		57-69	Christon (20)	Christon, McCarville (6)	Moore (2)	Target Center; 5,620	2-4
7	June 26	7:30pm	Indiana		81-82 (OT)	Christon (20)	McCarville (9)	Moore (6)	Madison Square Garden; 9,304	2-5
8	June 27	7:00pm	@ Indiana	MSG	54-63	Carson (14)	Jackson (9)	Moore (3)	Conseco Fieldhouse; 8,481	2-6

July

Game	Date	Time (ET)	Opponent	TV	Score	High points	High rebounds	High assists	Location/Attendance	Record
9	July 2	7:30pm	Detroit	MSG	80-64	Christon (25)	Kraayeveld (5)	McCarville (5)	Madison Square Garden; 8,018	3-6
10	July 9	7:30pm	Los Angeles	MSG	60-69	McCarville (18)	McCarville (6)	McCarville (3)	Madison Square Garden; 12,247	3-7
11	July 11	7:30pm	Atlanta		71-69	Christon (18)	McCarville (7)	Moore (6)	Madison Square Garden; 8,732	4-7
12	July 18	7:00pm	@ Washington		67-68	Christon (21)	Moore (5)	Moore (9)	Verizon Center; 9,968	4-8
13	July 19	4:00pm	Atlanta		89-86	Christon (32)	Christon (8)	Mitchell (6)	Madison Square Garden; 8,560	5-8
14	July 22	12:30pm	@ Chicago		77-70	Spencer (15)	Kraayeveld (8)	Moore (4)	UIC Pavilion; 5,881	6-8
15	July 23	7:30pm	Sacramento	MSG	73-88	Carson (20)	Carson (5)	Moore (4)	Madison Square Garden; 8,845	6-9
16	July 26	4:00pm	Phoenix		88-94	Christon (21)	McCarville (10)	Moore, Spencer (3)	Madison Square Garden; 11,211	6-10
17	July 30	7:30pm	Washington	NBA TV; MSG	75-78	McCarville (28)	McCarville (6)	McCarville, Mitchell, Moore (3)	Madison Square Garden; 10,172	6-11

August

Game	Date	Time (ET)	Opponent	TV	Score	High points	High rebounds	High assists	Location/Attendance	Record
18	August 1	7:00pm	@ Atlanta	NBA TV; MSG	83-89	Christon (23)	Carson, Christon (8)	McCarville (6)	Philips Arena; 6,103	6-12
19	August 4	7:30pm	@ Detroit	ESPN2	64-76	Christon (14)	Christon, Jackson, McCarville (4)	7 players (1)	Palace of Auburn Hills; 7,014	6-13
20	August 7	10:00pm	@ Sacramento		84-66	McCarville (18)	Jackson (6)	McCarville (5)	ARCO Arena; 6,284	7-13
21	August 8	10:00pm	@ Seattle		69-70	McCarville (22)	Christon (9)	Moore (5)	KeyArena; 7,496	7-14
22	August 11	9:00pm	@ Los Angeles	ESPN2	65-61	Christon (11)	Christon, Moore (6)	Christon, Moore (5)	STAPLES Center; 9,548	8-14
23	August 14	7:30pm	Chicago	NBA TV; MSG; CN100	77-88	Christon (25)	Christon (10)	Moore (6)	Madison Square Garden; 9,832	8-15
24	August 16	4:00pm	@ Washington		60-59	McCarville (19)	Kraayeveld (6)	Moore (5)	Verizon Center; 10,580	9-15
25	August 19	7:00pm	@ Connecticut		69-74	Kraayeveld (13)	McCarville (9)	Mitchell (4)	Mohegan Sun Arena; 6,050	9-16
26	August 21	7:30pm	Connecticut	NBA TV; MSG	85-83 (OT)	Christon (23)	McCarville (13)	Moore (5)	Madison Square Garden; 9,355	10-16
27	August 23	4:00pm	Minnesota		80-67	Christon (24)	Jackson (7)	Moore (6)	Madison Square Garden; 8,481	11-16
28	August 28	8:30pm	@ Chicago	NBA TV; MSG; CN100	77-96	Jackson (16)	Vaughn (9)	Christon (6)	UIC Pavilion; 3,707	11-17
29	August 30	4:00pm	Chicago		77-63	Christon (18)	Kraayeveld (13)	Moore (5)	Madison Square Garden; 8,685	12-17

September

Game	Date	Time (ET)	Opponent	TV	Score	High points	High rebounds	High assists	Location/Attendance	Record
30	September 1	7:30pm	Seattle		58-65	Kraayeveld (14)	Kraayeveld (9)	Moore (4)	Madison Square Garden; 8,469	12-18
31	September 4	7:00pm	@ Connecticut	NBA TV; MSG	85-88 (OT)	Christon (22)	Moore (8)	Moore (4)	Mohegan Sun Arena; 6,685	12-19
32	September 8	7:30pm	Indiana		63-69	Carson (17)	Larkins, Mitchell (6)	Mitchell (6)	Madison Square Garden; 7,583	12-20
33	September 10	7:30pm	@ Detroit	NBA TV; MSG	87-94 (OT)	Carson (28)	Battle, Vaughn (4)	Moore (6)	Palace of Auburn Hills; 8,178	12-21
34	September 13	4:00pm	Washington	MSG	86-65	Carson (17)	Jackson, Kraayeveld (5)	Mitchell (6)	Madison Square Garden; 15,667	13-21

All games are viewable on WNBA LiveAccess

== Regular Season Statistics ==
Legend
GP	Games played	GS	Games started	MPG	Minutes per game	RPG	Rebounds per game
APG	Assists per game	SPG	Steals per game	BPG	Blocks per game	PPG	Points per game
FG%	Field-goal percentage	3P%	3-point field-goal percentage	FT%	Free-throw percentage	TO	Turnovers per game
PF	Fouls per game		Team leader		League leader

=== Player statistics ===
Player	GP	GS	MPG	RPG	APG	SPG	BPG	PPG
Ashley Battle	34	3	16.1	2.5	1.2	0.91	0.06	5.2
Essence Carson	34	34	25.3	2.1	1.4	1.09	0.29	10.0
Shameka Christon	32	31	31.7	4.9	1.8	0.88	0.84	16.1
Tiffany Jackson	34	9	14.6	3.4	0.7	0.62	0.38	5.3
Cathrine Kraayeveld	34	26	26.1	4.6	0.9	0.65	0.38	9.0
Erlana Larkins	18	0	7.6	1.7	0.4	0.50	0.22	2.4
Janel McCarville	32	32	26.5	5.5	2.8	1.28	1.38	12.3
Leilani Mitchell	34	2	12.8	1.2	2.2	0.26	0.06	2.4
Loree Moore	34	32	27.7	3.7	3.9	1.94	0.06	6.3
Sidney Spencer	33	0	10.3	1.2	0.5	0.18	0.03	3.0
Kia Vaughn	34	1	11.6	2.6	0.2	0.18	0.09	4.8

=== Team statistics ===
Team	FG%	3P%	FT%	RPG	APG	SPG	BPG	TO	PF	PPG
New York Liberty	.415	.358	.787	31.8	15.5	8.1	3.6	16.0	18.7	73.9
Opponents	.420	.347	.789	35.4	14.2	7.9	3.6	16.1	17.4	74.6

== Awards and honors ==
- Shameka Christon was named WNBA Eastern Conference Player of the Week for the week of July 13, 2009.
- Shameka Christon was named to the 2009 WNBA All-Star Team as an Eastern Conference reserve.
- July 25, 2009: Teresa Weatherspoon, who led the New York Liberty to three WNBA finals, will be inducted into the Women's Basketball Hall of Fame, leading a class of six inductees.
