= 2005 New York Liberty season =

- Head coach: Pat Coyle
- Arena: Madison Square Garden

Results
- Record: 18–16 (.529)
- Place: 3rd (Eastern)
- Playoff finish: Lost First Round (2-0) to Indiana Fever

The 2005 New York Liberty season was the 9th season for the New York Liberty franchise of the WNBA, and their first full season under head coach, Pat Coyle. The Liberty advanced to the playoffs, but they were quickly swept by the Indiana Fever in the Conference Semifinals.

== Offseason ==
=== WNBA draft ===
Round	Pick	Player	Nationality	School/Club team
1	10	Loree Moore (G)	United States	Tennessee
2	23	Tabitha Pool (F)	United States	Michigan
3	36	Rebecca Richman (C)	United States	Rutgers

== Regular season ==
=== Season standings ===
Eastern Conference	W	L	PCT	GB	Home	Road	Conf.
Connecticut Sun ^{x}	26	8	.765	–	14–3	12–5	13–7
Indiana Fever ^{x}	21	13	.618	5.0	14–3	7–10	14–6
New York Liberty ^{x}	18	16	.529	8.0	10–7	8–9	9–11
Detroit Shock ^{x}	16	18	.471	10.0	12–5	4–13	11–9
Washington Mystics ^{o}	16	18	.471	10.0	10–7	6–11	9–11
Charlotte Sting ^{o}	6	28	.176	20.0	5–12	1–16	4–16

=== Season schedule ===
Date	Opponent	Score	Result	Record
May 22	Detroit	71-78	Loss	0-1
May 26	Indiana	59-67	Loss	0-2
June 1	@ Washington	77-68	Win	1-2
June 3	@ Detroit	66-68 (OT)	Loss	1-3
June 5	Washington	61-58	Win	2-3
June 10	@ Indiana	59-62	Loss	2-4
June 12	Detroit	72-69	Win	3-4
June 18	Phoenix	65-54	Win	4-4
June 21	San Antonio	77-59	Win	5-4
June 25	@ Charlotte	61-67	Loss	5-5
June 30	Sacramento	50-61	Loss	5-6
July 2	@ San Antonio	57-69	Loss	5-7
July 5	@ Los Angeles	67-55	Win	6-7
July 7	Connecticut	89-79	Win	7-7
July 12	@ Houston	68-65 (OT)	Win	8-7
July 15	Minnesota	60-64	Loss	8-8
July 19	@ Seattle	78-87	Loss	8-9
July 21	@ Phoenix	80-70	Win	9-9
July 22	@ Sacramento	73-63	Win	10-9
July 24	@ Minnesota	59-47	Win	11-9
July 27	Houston	69-71	Loss	11-10
July 28	@ Connecticut	70-73	Loss	11-11
July 31	Indiana	67-53	Win	12-11
August 2	Connecticut	65-72	Loss	12-12
August 6	Seattle	79-67	Win	13-12
August 7	@ Detroit	67-72	Loss	13-13
August 10	Los Angeles	74-69	Win	14-13
August 12	@ Charlotte	82-74 (2OT)	Win	15-13
August 14	Charlotte	73-65	Win	16-13
August 16	Washington	72-66	Win	17-13
August 20	@ Connecticut	64-58	Win	18-13
August 23	@ Washington	69-82 (OT)	Loss	18-14
August 25	Charlotte	66-78	Loss	18-15
August 27	@ Indiana	50-75	Loss	18-16

== Playoffs ==
Game	Date	Opponent	Score	Result	Record
Eastern Conference Semifinals
1	August 30	Indiana	51-63	Loss	0-1
2	September 1	@ Indiana	50-58	Loss	0-2

== Player stats ==
Player	GP	REB	AST	STL	BLK	PTS
Becky Hammon	34	114	146	60	2	473
Ann Wauters	28	184	41	18	23	383
Vickie Johnson	34	118	92	23	2	353
Shameka Christon	34	92	41	33	19	311
Elena Baranova	33	227	59	25	46	288
Crystal Robinson	32	100	58	21	5	234
La'Keshia Frett	33	38	18	12	4	98
Cathrine Kraayeveld	17	27	5	4	8	69
Erin Thorn	21	14	13	4	0	56
Loree Moore	24	27	19	10	0	22
DeTrina White	13	22	0	4	3	16
Tamara Moore	7	7	6	0	0	11
Edwige Lawson-Wade	2	2	0	0	0	2
Amisha Carter	3	2	0	0	0	0
Jennifer Smith	2	0	0	0	0	0
