= New York Liberty =

Women's National Basketball Association franchise based in New York City

- 2026 New York Liberty season
- Conference: Eastern
- League: WNBA
- Founded: 1997
- History: New York Liberty; 1997–present
- Arena: Barclays Center
- Location: Brooklyn, New York
- Team colors: Seafoam green, black, white
- Main sponsor: Barclays
- CEO: Keia Clarke
- General manager: Jonathan Kolb
- Head coach: Vacant
- Assistants: Courtney Paris; Addi Walters; Will Sheehey
- Ownership: Joseph Tsai and Clara Wu Tsai
- Championships: 1 (2024)
- Conference titles: 3 (1999, 2000, 2002) (Note: The WNBA awarded conference championships to the winners of the Conference Finals in the playoffs from 1998 to 2015.)
- Commissioner's Cup titles: 2 (2023, 2026)
- Website: liberty.wnba.com
Heroine	Explorer	Rebel

The New York Liberty are an American professional basketball team based in the New York City borough of Brooklyn. The Liberty compete in the Women's National Basketball Association (WNBA) as a member of the Eastern Conference. The team was founded in 1997 and is one of the eight original franchises of the league. The team is owned by Joe Tsai and Clara Wu Tsai, the majority owners of the NBA's Brooklyn Nets. The team plays its home games at Barclays Center, with their mascot being Ellie the Elephant, who was first introduced on May 6, 2021.

The Liberty have qualified for the WNBA playoffs in nineteen of its twenty-eight years as a franchise. Several notable players have played for the Liberty, such as Teresa Weatherspoon, Rebecca Lobo, Becky Hammon, Leilani Mitchell, Essence Carson, Cappie Pondexter, Tina Charles, the team's first-ever No.1 overall draft pick Sabrina Ionescu, Breanna Stewart, Jonquel Jones, and Courtney Vandersloot.

The Liberty have three conference championships, and one WNBA championship. They have played in the WNBA Finals six times— defeating the Minnesota Lynx in 2024, and losing to the Houston Comets in 1997, 1999, and 2000, the Los Angeles Sparks in 2002 and the Las Vegas Aces in 2023.

== History ==
=== Early success (1997–2002) ===
Prior to the team's first season, to avoid potential trademark infringement, the team purchased the trademarks of the defunct Liberty Basketball Association.

When the WNBA opened in 1997, the Liberty were one of the first teams to choose a player, and they signed college superstar Rebecca Lobo (UConn) to a contract. Lobo was a starter for two seasons, but was injured in 1999. Her injuries eventually led to her retirement several seasons later. Point guard Teresa Weatherspoon emerged as a star, and the Liberty made it to the 1997 championship game, where the team lost to the Houston Comets. In 1999, they added Crystal Robinson with the 6th overall pick and returned to the WNBA Finals, where they again faced the Comets. In Game 2, Teresa Weatherspoon's halfcourt shot at the buzzer gave the Liberty a one-point road win that tied the series at a game apiece. However, the Liberty lost the third game of the series and the Comets became champions for a third straight time.

In 2000, the Liberty traded for Tari Phillips who blossomed in New York and made four straight All-Star teams. In 2001, Weatherspoon became the WNBA's all-time assist leader. Teamed with Robinson, Phillips and an emerging Sue Wicks, who was once a back-up to Lobo at forward but made the 2000 All-Star game, Weatherspoon and the Liberty subsequently returned to the finals in 2000 and 2002, but lost once again to the Comets and to the Los Angeles Sparks, respectively. The Liberty also advanced to the WNBA Eastern Conference Finals in 2001.

=== Transition seasons (2003–2009) ===
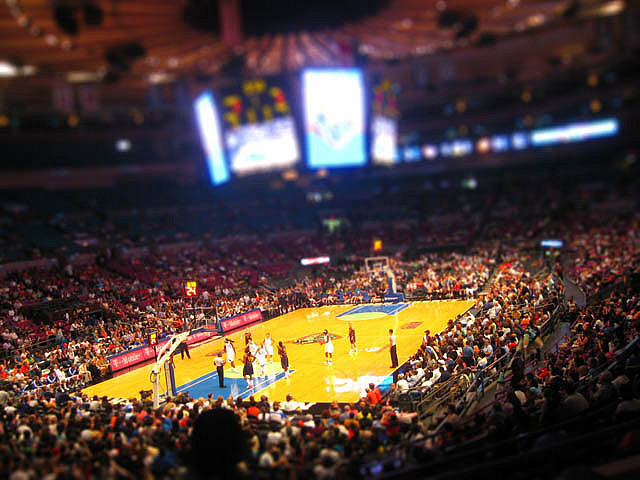
Madison Square Garden during a Liberty game

The 2003 season marked a transition for the Liberty and with team leader Teresa Weatherspoon's WNBA career winding down, fan favorite Becky Hammon emerged as a star player. The 2004 season saw Hammon replacing Weatherspoon as the team's starting point guard.

The Liberty played six of their home games during the 2004 season at Radio City Music Hall as Madison Square Garden was hosting the 2004 Republican National Convention. These games marked the first time Radio City had hosted a professional sporting event since the Roy Jones Jr. boxing match held in 1999.

With team leader Tari Phillips being signed away to the Houston Comets, Ann Wauters emerged as a force at the team's starting center position in 2005. However, she was injured midway through the season. The loss of Wauters was felt as the team was swept two games to none by the Indiana Fever in the first round of the playoffs.

The Liberty had a poor 2006 season, winning only 11 games.

At the beginning of the 2007 WNBA season, the team traded Becky Hammon to the San Antonio Silver Stars for Jessica Davenport, a first round pick in the 2007 WNBA draft. They also acquired center Janel McCarville through the dispersal draft associated with the dissolution of the Charlotte Sting. The 2007 Liberty started out 5–0, then lost 7 straight games, then rallied at the end of the season to get the last playoff spot by winning 3 out of their last 4 games, beating the Washington Mystics on the tiebreaker of head-to-head record. In the Eastern Conference semifinals, the Liberty, as huge underdogs, faced the defending champion Detroit Shock in a best-of-three series. The Liberty defeated the Shock in game 1 in New York. In games 2 and 3 the Liberty lost both games to the Shock in Detroit, 76–73 and 71–70 (OT), respectively.

In 2008, the Liberty drafted former Rutgers shooting guard Essence Carson and former North Carolina forward Erlana Larkins, and signed former Utah point guard Leilani Mitchell during the preseason. Despite having the youngest average age of any WNBA team, the Liberty managed to win 19 regular season games in 2008, to defeat the Connecticut Sun in the first round of playoff action, and to come within two points of defeating the Detroit Shock in the third and last game of the Eastern Conference Finals. Again, the Detroit series entailed a Liberty victory at home in Game 1, followed by narrow defeats away in Games 2 and 3. The 2008 season also featured the "Liberty Outdoor Classic", the first ever professional regular season basketball game to be played outdoors, on July 19 at Arthur Ashe Stadium of the USTA Billie Jean King National Tennis Center. The Indiana Fever defeated the Liberty in the Outdoor Classic.

In the 2009 WNBA draft, the Liberty selected local favorite Kia Vaughn from Rutgers. With a solid core group, the Liberty looked to be a contender in the East yet again.

In the 2009 season, however, they never proved to be a contender and the team fired head coach Pat Coyle. To replace Coyle, the Liberty hired then-Liberty assistant coach Anne Donovan on an interim basis. Despite the coaching change, the franchise continued to struggle, finishing 13–21, their second worst record in franchise history.

=== The Cappie Pondexter era (2010–2014) ===
The New York Liberty fared better in 2010, during Donovan's first and only full season as head coach. Led by newly signed high scorer Cappie Pondexter (formerly of the Phoenix Mercury) and the 2010 Most Improved Player Award winner Leilani Mitchell, the team made it all the way to the Eastern Conference Finals, where they lost to the Atlanta Dream.

The team had high hopes for 2011, after the hiring of former WNBA champion head coach John Whisenant. Janel McCarville did not report to training camp, seeking time with her family, and as such, was suspended for the duration of the 2011 season. This caused division and discord within the New York Liberty fanbase. Kia Vaughn was unexpectedly thrust into the role of starting Center.

The Liberty were originally scheduled to be displaced from their usual home court due to renovations at Madison Square Garden scheduled to begin in 2009. However, the renovation plans were delayed, and the Liberty played at the Garden in 2009 and 2010. The Liberty ended up playing in the Prudential Center in Newark, New Jersey, for their 2011, 2012, and 2013 seasons while the renovations were ongoing.

Pondexter and Plenette Pierson, along with improved play from Vaughn, allowed New York to be competitive early in the 2011 season. The team went into the All-Star break in third place in the Eastern Conference. In August, Sidney Spencer was traded to the Phoenix Mercury in exchange for Kara Braxton. By maintaining a fairly even standard of play, the Liberty made their way into the WNBA playoffs. However, the Liberty fell to the Indiana Fever in the Eastern Conference Semifinals.

Just before the 2014 WNBA draft, the New York Liberty traded Kelsey Bone, the fourth overall pick in the 2014 WNBA draft (Alyssa Thomas) and the fourth overall pick in the 2015 WNBA draft to the Connecticut Sun for WNBA All-Star Tina Charles, who had requested a trade.

In February 2015, Pondexter was traded to the Chicago Sky for Epiphanny Prince.

=== The Isiah Thomas era (2015–2018) ===
On May 5, 2015, the Liberty hired Thomas as team president overseeing all business and basketball operations of the franchise. Under Thomas' leadership as team president and the coaching staff led by Bill Laimbeer as head coach, the Liberty finished first in the Eastern Conference during the 2015 season.

On August 2, 2015, during halftime of the game against the Seattle Storm, the New York Liberty inducted WNBA legend Becky Hammon into the Liberty's Ring of Honor. Thomas presented Hammon with her ring during the induction ceremony at Madison Square Garden. Hammon is currently the head coach of the WNBA's Las Vegas Aces.

After qualifying for the 2016 WNBA playoffs, the Liberty lost to the Phoenix Mercury in the second round. The Liberty lost to the Washington Mystics in the second round of the 2017 WNBA playoffs.

In November 2017, the Madison Square Garden Company and James L. Dolan announced they were actively looking to sell the franchise. After not immediately finding a buyer, MSG relocated most of the Liberty's 2018 home games to Westchester County Center in nearby White Plains, New York, the home of MSG's NBA G League team the Westchester Knicks, while still continuing to pursue a sale. In 2018, the Liberty failed to make the playoffs, with a 7–27 record.

=== The Tsai era and 2024 championship (2019–present) ===
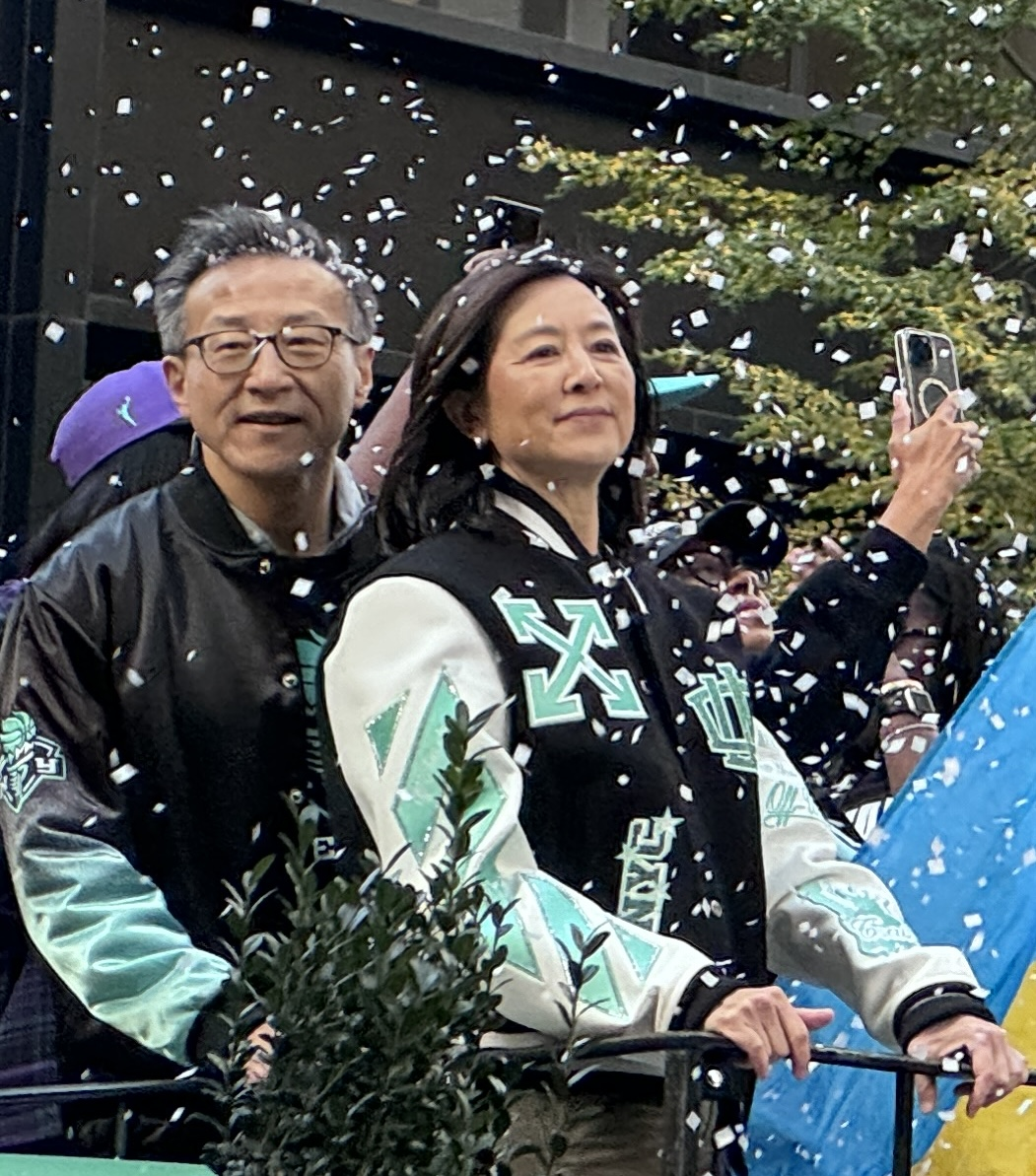
Joseph Tsai and Clara Wu Tsai at the New York Liberty's 2024 Ticker Tape Parade.

On January 23, 2019, the Liberty were sold to Joseph Tsai, co-founder of the Alibaba Group, a Chinese internet company, who then owned 49% of the NBA's Brooklyn Nets, and Clara Wu Tsai, an American businesswoman and founder of nonprofit organization Reform Alliance. Isiah Thomas was relieved of his duties a month later, on February 21, 2019. During the 2019 season, the Liberty played two games in Brooklyn at the Nets' home of the Barclays Center, with the rest still in White Plains. Later that year, Joseph Tsai became the sole owner of the Nets and the Barclays Center. For the 2020 season, the Tsais relocated the Liberty to Brooklyn on a full-time basis.

The Liberty were major players in the 2020 WNBA draft, entering that draft with three first-round picks plus two in the early second round. Shortly before the draft, they traded former league MVP Tina Charles to the Washington Mystics in a deal that also involved the Dallas Wings. They chose Sabrina Ionescu as the first pick, with Megan Walker and Jazmine Jones selected later in that round. The team also introduced a new logo, featuring a simplified version of their Statue of Liberty branding. The color black was also made one of the primary colors, echoing the aesthetic of their NBA brother squad, the Brooklyn Nets.

The Liberty began the 2020 season, held in a "bubble" in Bradenton, Florida, due to the COVID-19 pandemic, with seven rookies on their opening-night roster. The team suffered a major blow in their third game, in which Ionescu suffered a severe ankle sprain that ultimately ended her season. The Liberty ended the season with a league-worst 2–20 record. Despite the lack of wins, one of the first-year players, 12th overall pick Jazmine Jones, was named to the Associated Press and WNBA's All-Rookie teams.

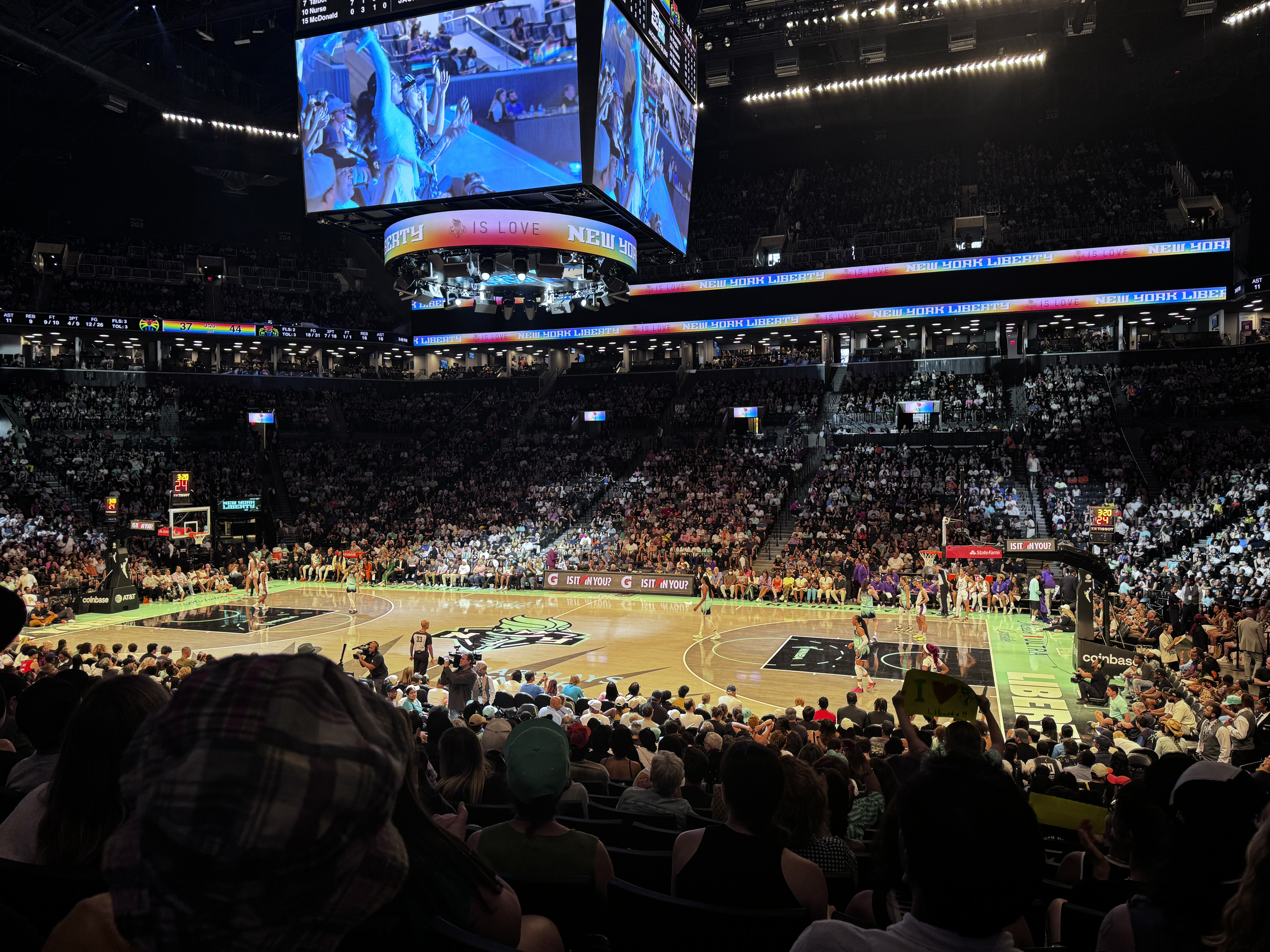
2024 New York Liberty Game at the Barclays Center Arena

The Liberty made major splashes during the 2021 offseason. Prior to its first season as full-time tenants of Barclays Center, the Liberty added WNBA champions Natasha Howard and Sami Whitcomb in a multi-team trade that sent Kia Nurse and Megan Walker to the Phoenix Mercury and signed Betnijah Laney, the league's 2020 Most Improved Player Award winner. The team then added Michaela Onyenwere and DiDi Richards in the 2021 WNBA draft. Laney would represent the Liberty at the 2021 WNBA All-Star Game while Onyenwere won the Associated Press' and WNBA Rookie of the Year Award. New York finished the year with a 12–20 record but the 10-game improvement in the win column was enough to push the team into the WNBA playoffs for the first time since 2017. Seeded eighth, the Liberty put up a valiant effort against no. 5 Phoenix in the opening round but fell by an 83–82 final.

On December 6, 2021, the Liberty and head coach Walt Hopkins Jr. parted ways. The team would hire former Phoenix head coach Sandy Brondello in his place just over a month later on January 7, 2022. On the roster, the team brought in Stefanie Dolson of the defending champion Chicago Sky and drafted Nyara Sabally fifth overall, though the latter would miss her whole rookie season with an injury. In Brondello's first season at the helm, the team was forced to overcome an early injury to Laney and got off to a 1–7 start. But the All-Star efforts of Ionescu and Howard kept the team afloat and they would end the season on a three-game winning streak to secure its second consecutive playoff berth. In the ensuing postseason, the Liberty won the opening game of a best-of-three set with the Chicago Sky but dropped the latter pair.

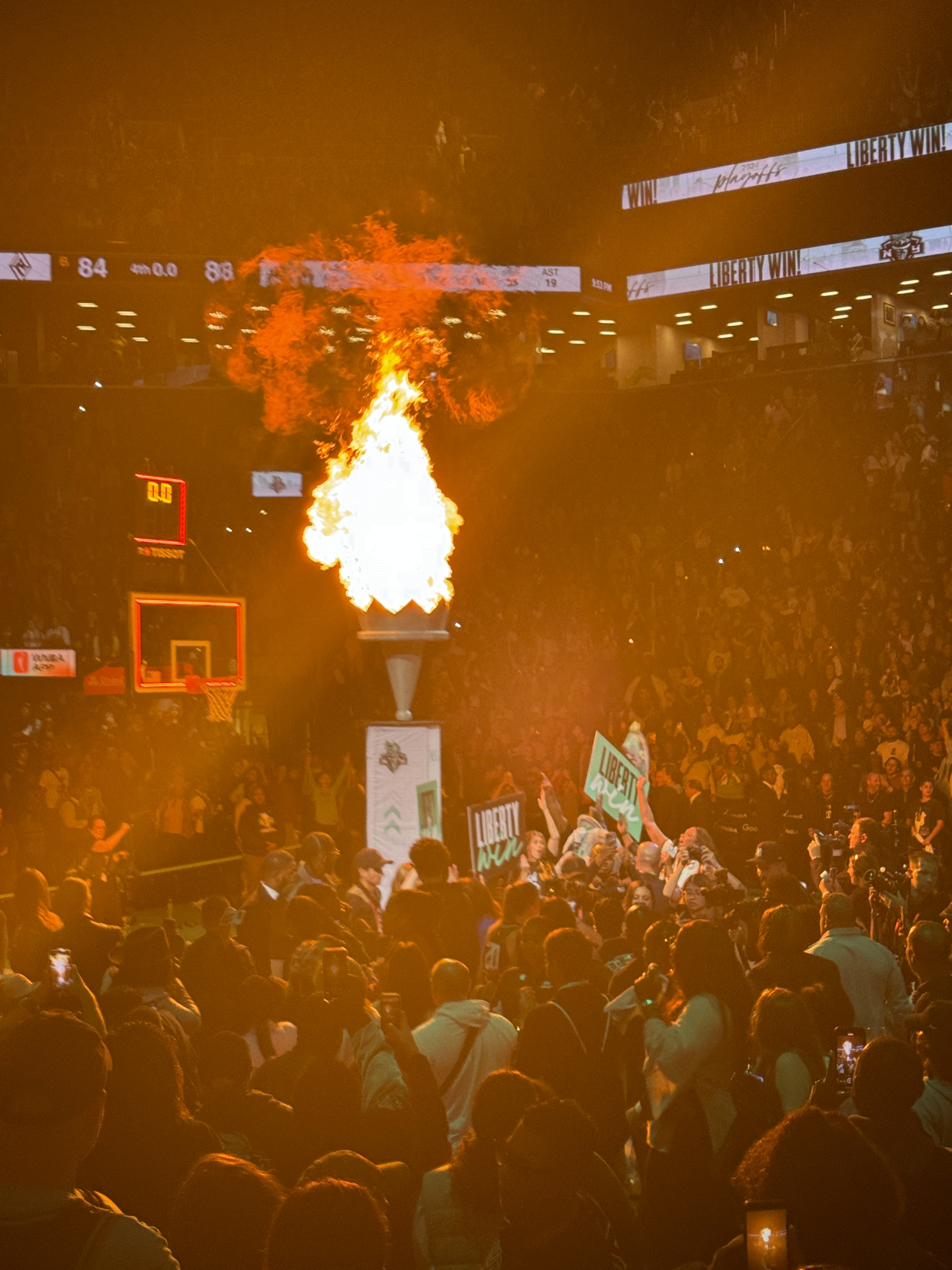
The New York Liberty's "Light it Up" torch is lit after an October 1, 2024 New York Liberty win against the Las Vegas Aces in the Semifinals of the 2024 WNBA Playoffs.

In 2023, the Liberty made several major transactions that turned them into immediate contenders: the team acquired 2021 WNBA MVP Jonquel Jones from the Connecticut Sun in a three-team deal that also obtained reserve Kayla Thornton from the Dallas Wings. The Liberty then added the equally accomplished Breanna Stewart and Courtney Vandersloot in free agency. Over the ensuing season, the Liberty won a franchise-record 32 games and defeated the Las Vegas Aces in the Commissioner's Cup in-season competition, with Jones securing MVP honors. The Liberty then took down the Washington Mystics and Connecticut Sun in the WNBA playoffs to earn their first WNBA Finals berth since 2002. Las Vegas, however, took revenge and the best-of-five series in four games.

New York retained most of its core from the Finals run, re-signing both Jones and Stewart. Further assisted by the emergence of WNBA rookie Leonie Fiebich, the Liberty once again won 32 games, tying the franchise record set the year before. The Liberty also returned to the Commissioner's Cup final but were denied a repeat by the Minnesota Lynx. This time around, the 32 wins were good enough to secure the top seed on the WNBA playoff bracket, which saw the Liberty sweep the eighth-ranked Atlanta Dream in two games before defeating the Aces 3–1 in the semifinals. New York won its first WNBA championship, beating the Minnesota Lynx in the 2024 WNBA Finals.

Coming off their first-ever WNBA championship, the Liberty entered the 2025 season with high expectations and began the year with a dominant 9-0 start. Their first loss came on June 14 against the Indiana Fever. Despite the strong start, the Liberty's momentum was hampered by a series of injuries. The team's "big three"—Sabrina Ionescu, Jonquel Jones and Breanna Stewart—each missed significant time due to injuries. Ionescu was sidelined for four games with a toe injury, Jones missed nearly six weeks due to a sprained ankle and a later aggravation of the same injury, and Stewart was out for a month with a bone bruise. Betnijah Laney-Hamilton missed the entire season and Leonie Fiebich missed nearly a month while representing Germany at EuroBasket. Amid the injury-plagued season, the Liberty made a historic move by signing Emma Meesseman on August 1, marking her return to the league for the first time since 2022. The Liberty concluded the regular season with a 27-17 record, securing the No. 5 seed and their fifth consecutive playoff appearance. In the first round, they faced the No. 4 seed Phoenix Mercury. Liberty won Game 1, 76–69, despite Stewart spraining the MCL in her left knee during overtime. Although she returned for Game 2, she played only 20 minutes and scored six points in what turned into an embarrassing 86–60 loss—the worst home playoff defeat in franchise history and the second-worst playoff loss by a defending WNBA champion. In the decisive Game 3, Stewart scored 30 points, including all 14 of the Liberty's points in the fourth quarter, but the team fell short, losing 79–73 and ending their playoff run.

On September 23, the Liberty announced they had parted ways with head coach Sandy Brondello, less than a year after she led the team to its first championship. General manager Jonathan Kolb stated, “I think our organization has always taken pride in being innovative and looking forward and being future oriented and process based. For us, we not only evaluate throughout the season our own team, but we also evaluate the league and with where this league is going. We felt very confident that we need to move forward.”

On September 29, 2026 the Liberty became the first eighth-seed to knock out the first-seed in WNBA history after defeating the Minnesota Lynx in game 2 of the playoffs.

== Season-by-season records ==
Season	Team	Conference		Regular season			Playoff results	Head coach
Season	Team	Conference		W	L	Win %	Playoff results	Head coach
New York Liberty
1997	1997	East	2nd	17	11	.607	Won WNBA Semifinals (Phoenix, 1–0); Lost WNBA Finals (Houston, 0–1)	Nancy Darsch
1998	1998	East	3rd	18	12	.600	Did not qualify	Nancy Darsch
1999	1999	East	1st	18	14	.563	Received a bye for the Conference Semifinals; Won Conference Finals (Charlotte, 2–1); Lost WNBA Finals (Houston, 1–2)	Richie Adubato
2000	2000	East	1st	20	12	.625	Won Conference Semifinals (Washington, 2–0); Won Conference Finals (Cleveland, 2–1); Lost WNBA Finals (Houston, 0–2)	Richie Adubato
2001	2001	East	2nd	21	11	.656	Won Conference Semifinals (Miami, 2–1); Lost Conference Finals (Charlotte, 1–2)	Richie Adubato
2002	2002	East	1st	18	14	.563	Won Conference Semifinals (Indiana, 2–1); Won Conference Finals (Washington, 2–1); Lost WNBA Finals (Los Angeles, 0–2)	Richie Adubato
2003	2003	East	6th	16	18	.471	Did not qualify	Richie Adubato
2004	2004	East	2nd	18	16	.529	Won Conference Semifinals (Detroit, 2–1); Lost Conference Finals (Connecticut, 0–2)	R. Adubato (7–9); P. Coyle (11–7)
2005	2005	East	3rd	18	16	.529	Lost Conference Semifinals (Indiana, 0–2)	Pat Coyle
2006	2006	East	5th	11	23	.324	Did not qualify	Pat Coyle
2007	2007	East	4th	16	18	.471	Lost Conference Semifinals (Detroit, 1–2)	Pat Coyle
2008	2008	East	3rd	19	15	.559	Won Conference Semifinals (Connecticut, 2–1); Lost Conference Finals (Detroit, 1–2)	Pat Coyle
2009	2009	East	7th	13	21	.382	Did not qualify	P. Coyle (6–11); A. Donovan (7–10)
2010	2010	East	2nd	22	12	.647	Won Conference Semifinals (Indiana, 2–1); Lost Conference Finals (Atlanta, 0–2)	Anne Donovan
2011	2011	East	4th	19	15	.559	Lost Conference Semifinals (Indiana, 1–2)	John Whisenant
2012	2012	East	4th	15	19	.441	Lost Conference Semifinals (Connecticut, 0–2)	John Whisenant
2013	2013	East	5th	11	23	.324	Did not qualify	Bill Laimbeer
2014	2014	East	5th	15	19	.441	Did not qualify	Bill Laimbeer
2015	2015	East	1st	23	11	.676	Won Conference Semifinals (Washington, 2–1); Lost Conference Finals (Indiana 1–2)	Bill Laimbeer
2016	2016	East	1st	21	13	.618	Lost Second Round (Phoenix 0–1)	Bill Laimbeer
2017	2017	East	1st	22	12	.647	Lost Second Round (Washington 0–1)	Bill Laimbeer
2018	2018	East	5th	7	27	.206	Did not qualify	Katie Smith
2019	2019	East	5th	10	24	.294	Did not qualify	Katie Smith
2020	2020	East	6th	2	20	.091	Did not qualify	Walt Hopkins
2021	2021	East	3rd	12	20	.375	Lost First Round (Phoenix 0–1)	Walt Hopkins
2022	2022	East	4th	16	20	.444	Lost First Round (Chicago 1–2)	Sandy Brondello
2023	2023	East	1st	32	8	.800	Won First Round (Washington 2–0); Won Second Round (Connecticut, 3–1); Lost WNBA Finals (Las Vegas 1–3)	Sandy Brondello
2024	2024	East	1st	32	8	.800	Won First Round (Atlanta 2–0); Won Second Round (Las Vegas 3–1); Won WNBA Finals (Minnesota 3–2)	Sandy Brondello
2025	2025	East	2nd	27	17	.614	Lost First Round (Phoenix 1–2)	Sandy Brondello
2026	2026	East	8th	26	18	.591	Won First Round (Minnesota 2–0); Lost Second Round (Atlanta, 0-3)	Chris DeMarco
Regular season				535	487	.523	3 conference championships	
Playoffs				45	51	.469	1 WNBA championships, 5 Losses	

== Statistics ==
New York Liberty statistics
1990s

Season	Individual			Team vs opponents		
Season	PPG	RPG	APG	PPG	RPG	FG%
1997	S. Witherspoon (14.5)	R. Lobo (7.3)	T. Weatherspoon (6.1)	68.3 vs 65.9	32.9 vs 33.3	.412 vs .391
1998	S. Witherspoon (13.8)	R. Lobo (6.9)	T. Weatherspoon (6.4)	68.6 vs 65.5	31.5 vs 29.7	.425 vs .419
1999	V. Johnson (13.3)	S. Wicks (7.0)	T. Weatherspoon (6.4)	67.8 vs 65.3	29.5 vs 30.7	.418 vs .412

2000s

Season	Individual			Team vs opponents		
Season	PPG	RPG	APG	PPG	RPG	FG%
2000	T. Phillips (13.8)	T. Phillips (8.0)	T. Weatherspoon (6.4)	67.1 vs 63.6	29.4 vs 30.2	.436 vs .407
2001	T. Phillips (15.3)	T. Phillips (8.0)	T. Weatherspoon (6.3)	67.6 vs 65.1	28.6 vs 30.7	.456 vs .423
2002	T. Phillips (14.1)	T. Phillips (7.0)	T. Weatherspoon (5.7)	65.3 vs 63.0	27.2 vs 30.0	.444 vs .399
2003	B. Hammon (14.7)	T. Phillips (8.5)	T. Weatherspoon (4.4)	66.0 vs 66.4	28.1 vs 31.2	.429 vs .419
2004	B. Hammon (13.5)	E. Baranova (7.2)	B. Hammon (4.4)	66.2 vs 67.6	29.5 vs 32.4	.424 vs .414
2005	B. Hammon (13.9)	E. Baranova (6.9)	B. Hammon (4.3)	68.1 vs 67.2	28.6 vs 30.3	.445 vs .427
2006	B. Hammon (14.7)	K. Schumacher (5.5)	B. Hammon (3.7)	69.8 vs 78.2	30.0 vs 34.5	.397 vs .449
2007	S. Christon (11.2)	J. McCarville (4.8)	L. Moore (4.8)	71.0 vs 73.6	31.6 vs 35.7	.417 vs .414
2008	S. Christon (15.7)	C. Kraayeveld (6.1)	L. Moore (4.6)	75.7 vs 74.6	32.5 vs 34.6	.421 vs .427
2009	S. Christon (16.1)	J. McCarville (5.5)	L. Moore (3.9)	73.9 vs 74.6	31.8 vs 35.4	.415 vs .420

2010s

Season	Individual			Team vs opponents		
Season	PPG	RPG	APG	PPG	RPG	FG%
2010	C. Pondexter (21.4)	J. McCarville (5.9)	C. Pondexter (4.9)	79.2 vs 76.0	31.2 vs 32.0	.453 vs .436
2011	C. Pondexter (17.4)	K. Vaughn (6.7)	C. Pondexter (4.7)	76.0 vs 74.8	32.8 vs 32.4	.433 vs .429
2012	C. Pondexter (20.4)	P. Pierson (5.4)	C. Pondexter (4.3)	73.1 vs 77.2	33.4 vs 34.4	.425 vs .429
2013	C. Pondexter (16.9)	K. Braxton (6.6)	C. Pondexter (4.0)	69.6 vs 77.0	37.5 vs 35.0	.404 vs .408
2014	T. Charles (17.4)	T. Charles (9.4)	C. Pondexter (3.9)	72.1 vs 75.2	34.8 vs 33.9	.422 vs .426
2015	T. Charles (17.1)	T. Charles (8.5)	T. Wright (3.5)	74.4 vs 71.1	36.7 vs 31.5	.426 vs .393
2016	T. Charles (21.5)	T. Charles (9.9)	T. Charles (3.8)	81.6 vs 80.9	38.6 vs 34.0	.434 vs .413
2017	T. Charles (19.7)	T. Charles (9.4)	E. Prince (2.9)	79.7 vs 76.6	38.7 vs 31.8	.425 vs .408
2018	T. Charles (19.7)	T. Charles (7.0)	B. Boyd (5.3)	77.7 vs 84.8	34.1 vs 35.2	.432 vs .439
2019	T. Charles (16.9)	T. Charles (7.5)	B. Boyd (4.6)	77.4 vs 84.7	34.6 vs 35.7	.414 vs .438

2020s

Season	Individual			Team vs opponents		
Season	PPG	RPG	APG	PPG	RPG	FG%
2020	K. Nurse (12.2)	A. Zahui B. (8.5)	L. Clarendon (4.9)	71.9 vs 85.9	35.8 vs 37.0	.372 vs .444
2021	B. Laney (16.8)	N. Howard (7.2)	S. Ionescu (6.1)	78.5 vs 85.5	33.3 vs 36.6	.427 vs .438
2022	S. Ionescu (17.4)	N. Howard (7.3)	S. Ionescu (6.3)	79.6 vs 82.0	34.2 vs 35.7	.431 vs .418
2023	B. Stewart (23.0)	B. Stewart (9.3)	C. Vandersloot (8.1)	89.2 vs 80.6	37.9 vs 33.0	.460 vs .424
2024	B. Stewart (20.4)	J. Jones (9.0)	S. Ionescu (6.2)	85.6 vs 76.5	36.6 vs 32.7	.448 vs .425
2025	B. Stewart (18.3)	J. Jones (8.1)	S. Ionescu (5.7)	84.4 vs 80.3	33.7 vs 25.7	.453 vs .424

== Current roster ==
New York Liberty roster
Players
Coaches

Pos.	No.	Nat.	Name	Height	Weight	DOB	From	Yrs
G/F	9	(Australia)	Allen, Rebecca	6' 2" (1.88m)	162 lb (73kg)	1992-11-06	Deakin	9
G	18	(France)	Astier, Pauline	5' 10" (1.78m)		2002-02-15	France	R
F	5	(Nigeria)	Balogun, Elizabeth	6' 2" (1.88m)	183 lb (83kg)	2000-09-09	Duke	R
F/C	14	(Spain)	Carrera, Raquel	6' 3" (1.91m)		2001-10-31	Spain	R
G	4	(France)	Fauthoux, Marine	5' 9" (1.75m)		2001-01-23	France	R
F	13	(Germany)	Fiebich, Leonie (injured)	6' 4" (1.93m)		2000-01-10	Johann-Winklhofer	2
G	7	(United States)	Gardner, Rebekah	6' 1" (1.85m)	130 lb (59kg)	1990-07-09	UCLA	2
G	20	(United States)	Ionescu, Sabrina	5' 11" (1.8m)	165 lb (75kg)	1997-12-06	Oregon	5
G	23	(France)	Johannès, Marine	5' 10" (1.78m)	134 lb (61kg)	1995-01-21	France	3
C	35	(The Bahamas)	Jones, Jonquel	6' 6" (1.98m)	215 lb (98kg)	1994-01-05	George Washington	8
F	24	(Australia)	Maley, Anneli	6' 1" (1.85m)		1998-09-01	TCU	2
F	0	(Germany)	Sabally, Satou (injured)	6' 4" (1.93m)	175 lb (79kg)	1998-04-25	Oregon	5
G/F	10	(United States)	Scott, Madison	6' 2" (1.88m)		2001-12-27	Mississippi	1
F	30	(United States)	Stewart, Breanna	6' 4" (1.93m)	170 lb (77kg)	1994-08-27	Connecticut	8
C	21	(China)	Han Xu	6' 11" (2.11m)	203 lb (92kg)	1999-10-31	China	3

Assistant coaches
(United States) Courtney Paris (Oklahoma)
(United States) Will Sheehey (Indiana)
(United States) Andrew Wade (Catholic)
(United States) Addi Walters (Stetson)
Athletic trainer
(United States) Norielis Subero

Legend

- (C) Team captain
- (DP) Unsigned draft pick
- (FA) Free agent
- (S) Suspended
- Injured

WNBA roster page

East
ATL
CHI
CON
IND
NY
TOR
WAS
West
DAL
GS
LV
LA
MIN
PHO
POR
SEA

=== Other rights owned ===
Nationality	Name	Years pro	Last played	Drafted
(France)	Marine Fauthoux	—	—	2021
(Spain)	Raquel Carrera	—	—	2021

=== Former players ===
- Elena Baranova (2003–2005)
- Sherill Baker (2006–2007)
- Kelsey Bone (2013)
- Essence Carson (2008–2015)
- Swin Cash (2014–2016)
- Tina Charles (2014–2019), currently with the Atlanta Dream
- Shameka Christon (2004–2009)
- Jessica Davenport (2007–2008)
- Barbara Farris (2006–2007)
- Kisha Ford (1997–1998)
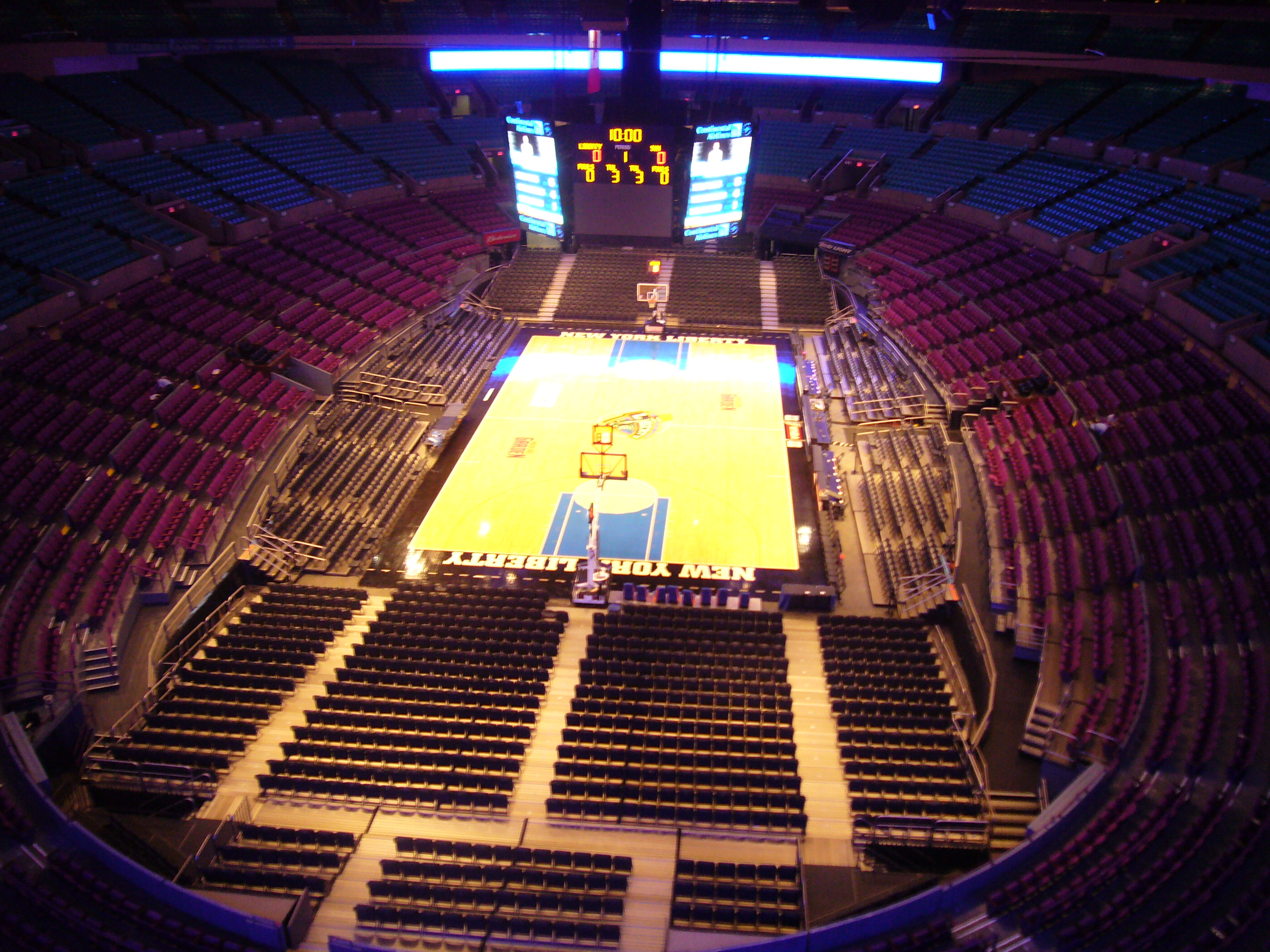
  Madison Square Garden was home to the Liberty from 1997 until 2018, except for the 2011, 2012, and 2013 seasons due to summer renovations.
- Becky Hammon (1999–2006), current head coach of the Las Vegas Aces
- Kym Hampton (1997–1999), current Fan Development Leader for the Liberty
- Lindsey Harding (2016), current assistant coach of the Los Angeles Lakers
- Tiffany Jackson Jones (2007–2010)
- Vickie Johnson (1997–2005), current assistant coach of the Atlanta Dream
- Cathrine Kraayeveld (2005–2009)
- Rebecca Lobo (1997–2001), current ESPN analyst
- Janel McCarville (2007–2010)
- Taj McWilliams-Franklin (2010)
- DeLisha Milton-Jones (2013–2014), current head coach of Old Dominion
- Leilani Mitchell (2008–2013)
- Loree Moore (2005–2009)
- Tari Phillips (2000–2004)
- Cappie Pondexter (2010–2014)
- Crystal Robinson (1999–2005)
- Katie Smith (2013), currently an assistant coach with the Ohio State Buckeyes women's basketball and a former head coach of the Liberty
- Erin Thorn (2003–2008)
- Kayla Thornton (2023–2024)
- Teresa Weatherspoon (1997–2003)
- Tamika Whitmore (1999–2003)
- Sue Wicks (1997–2002)
- Sophia Witherspoon (1997–1999)
- Amanda Zahui B. (2016–2020)

=== Honored numbers ===
New York Liberty honored numbers
No.	Player	Position	Tenure
11	Teresa Weatherspoon	G	1997–2003

== Coaches and staff ==
=== Owners ===
- Cablevision, owner of the New York Knicks (1997–2009)
- Madison Square Garden, Inc., owner of the New York Knicks (2010–2019)
- Clara Wu Tsai & Joe Tsai (2019–present)

=== General Managers ===
- Carol Blazejowski (1996–2010)
- John Whisenant (2011–2012)
- Bill Laimbeer (2013–2014, 2017)
- Kristin Bernert (2015–2016)
- Jonathan Kolb (2019–present)

== Head coaches ==
New York Liberty head coaches
Name	Start	End	Seasons	Regular season				Playoffs			
Name	Start	End	Seasons	W	L	Win %	G	W	L	Win %	G
Nancy Darsch	1997	1998	2	35	23	.603	58	1	1	.500	2
Richie Adubato	1998	2004	5	100	78	.562	178	14	13	.519	27
Pat Coyle	2004	2009	5	81	90	.474	171	6	10	.375	16
Anne Donovan	2009	2010	2	29	22	.569	51	2	3	.400	5
John Whisenant	2010	2012	2	34	34	.500	68	1	4	.200	5
Bill Laimbeer	2013	2017	5	92	78	.541	170	3	5	.375	8
Katie Smith	2018	2019	2	17	51	.250	68	0	0	–	0
Walt Hopkins	2020	2021	2	14	40	.259	54	0	1	–	0
Sandy Brondello	2022	2025	4	107	53	.669	160	16	11	.593	27

=== Assistant coaches ===
- Melissa McFerrin (1997–1998)
- Pat Coyle (1998–2004)
- Jeff House (1999–2004)
- Marianne Stanley (2004–2006)
- Nick DiPillo (2005–2008)
- Bruce Hamburger (2007–2008)
- Anne Donovan (2009)
- Laurie Byrd (2009–2010)
- Monique Ambers (2011–2012)
- Lady Grooms (2011–2012)
- Norm Ellenberger (2012)
- Barbara Farris (2013–2014, 2018–2019)
- Taj McWilliams-Franklin (2013)
- Katie Smith (2014–2017)
- Herb Williams (2015–2019)
- Charmin Smith (2019)
- Kelly Schumacher (2020)
- Shelley Patterson (2020–2021)
- Dustin Gray (2020–2021)
- Jacki Gemelos (2021)
- Olaf Lange (2022–2025)
- Roneeka Hodges (2022–2024)
- Zach O'Brien (2022-2025)
- Sonia Raman (2025)

== All-time notes ==
=== Home arenas ===
- Barclays Center; Brooklyn (2019, (Note: Two games) 2021–present)
- Westchester County Center; White Plains (2018–2019)
- Madison Square Garden; Manhattan (1997–2010, 2014–2017)
- Prudential Center; Newark (2011–2013)
- Arthur Ashe Stadium; Queens (2008) (Note: Liberty Outdoor Classic)
- Radio City Music Hall; Manhattan (2004) (Note: Six games)

=== Regular season attendance ===
- A sellout for a basketball game at Madison Square Garden (1997–2010) is 19,563.
- A sellout for a basketball game at Prudential Center (2011–2013) is 18,711.
- A sellout for a basketball game at Madison Square Garden (2013–2017) is 19,812.
- A sellout for a basketball game at Westchester County Center (2018–2019) is 5,000.
- A sellout for a Liberty game at Barclays Center (2021–present) is considered to be 8,575, the team's initial cap on ticket sales at that venue. The full capacity for basketball is 17,732.

Regular season all-time attendance
Year	Average	High	Low	Sellouts	Total for year	WNBA game average
1997	13,270 (2nd)	18,051	8,554	0	185,786	9,669
1998	14,935 (2nd)	19,563	11,276	1	224,024	10,869
1999	13,797 (2nd)	16,782	10,940	0	220,748	10,207
2000	14,498 (2nd)	19,563	11,257	1	231,962	9,074
2001	15,671 (1st)	18,213	12,262	0	250,735	9,075
2002	14,670 (2nd)	19,563	12,037	1	234,717	9,228
2003	12,491 (2nd)	15,424	10,711	0	212,346	8,800
2004	9,629 (3rd)	15,698	5,945	0	163,686	8,613
2005	10,145 (1st)	12,543	7,897	0	172,471	8,172
2006	9,120 (2nd)	14,070	7,751	0	155,048	7,476
2007	8,677 (2nd)	11,341	6,267	0	147,506	7,742
2008	9,045 (4th)	19,393	6,928	0	153,772	7,948
2009	9,800 (3rd)	15,667	8,018	0	166,604	8,039
2010	11,069 (1st)	18,162	7,537	0	188,173	7,834
2011	7,702 (8th)	14,314	5,725	0	130,936	7,954
2012	6,779 (9th)	14,715	4,723	0	115,241	7,452
2013	7,189 (7th)	12,858	5,766	0	122,217	7,531
2014	8,949 (3rd)	17,252	7,023	0	152,128	7,578
2015	9,159 (3rd)	18,617	5,663	0	155,695	7,184
2016	9,724 (2nd)	14,503	7,356		165,300	7,655
2017	9,888 (4th)	17,443	7,004	0	168,096	7,716
2018	2,823 (12th)	12,488	1,419	0	47,988	6,721
2019	2,239 (12th)	7,715	1,181	0	38,067	6,535
2020	Due to the COVID-19 pandemic, the season was played in Bradenton, Florida, without fans.					
2021	1,874 (9th)	3,114	815	0	28,113	2,636
2022	5,327 (8th)	9,896	3,054	0	95,882	5,679
2023	7,777 (5th)	11,615	5,719	0	155,535	6,615
2024	12,729 (2nd)	17,758	9,182	2	254,590	9,807
2025	16,323 (3rd)	17,532	14,774	0	359,107	10,986

=== Draft picks ===
- 1997 Elite: Kym Hampton (4), Vickie Johnson (12)
- 1997: Sue Wicks (6), Sophia Witherspoon (11), Trena Trice (22), Kisha Ford (27)
- 1998: Alicia Thompson (9), Nadine Domond (19), Albena Branzova (29), Vanessa Nygaard (39)
- 1999: Crystal Robinson (6), Michele Van Gorp (18), Tamika Whitmore (30), Carolyn Jones-Young (42)
- 2000: Olga Firsova (13), Desiree Francis (29), Jessica Bibby (45), Natalie Porter (61)
- 2001: Taru Tuukkanen (57), Tara Mitchem (60)
- 2002: Linda Frohlich (26), Tracy Gahan (46), Dee Dee Warley (62)
- 2003 Miami/Portland dispersal draft: Elena Baranova (11)
- 2003: Molly Creamer (10), Erin Thorn (17), Sonja Mallory (24), Kristen Brook Sharp (26), Nicole Kaczmarski (39)
- 2004 Cleveland dispersal draft: Ann Wauters (4)
- 2004: Shameka Christon (5), Amisha Carter (17), Cathy Joens (30)
- 2005: Loree Moore (10), Tabitha Pool (23), Rebecca Richman (36)
- 2006: Sherill Baker (12), Brooke Queenan (23), Christelle N'Garsanet (37)
- 2007 Charlotte dispersal draft: Janel McCarville (3)
- 2007: Tiffany Jackson (5), Shay Doron (16), Martina Weber (29)
- 2008: Essence Carson (7), Erlana Larkins (14), Wanisha Smith (27), Alberta Auguste (35)
- 2009 Houston dispersal draft: selection waived
- 2009: Kia Vaughn (8), Abby Waner (21)
- 2010 Sacramento dispersal draft: Nicole Powell (1)
- 2010: Kalana Greene (13), Ashley Houts (16), Cory Montgomery (25)
- 2011: Alex Montgomery (10), Angel Robinson (22), Mekia Valentine (34)
- 2012: Kelley Cain (7), Katelan Redmon (36)
- 2013: Kelsey Bone (5), Toni Young (7), Kamiko Williams (15), Shenneika Smith (25), Olcay Çakır (27)
- 2014: Alyssa Thomas (4), Tyaunna Marshall (14), Meighan Simmons (26)
- 2015: Brittany Boyd (9), Kiah Stokes (11), Amber Orrange (23), Laurin Mincy (27), Michala Johnson (28)
- 2016: Adut Bulgak (12), Ameryst Alston (24), Shacobia Barbee (36)
- 2017: Lindsay Allen (14), Kai James (34)
- 2018: Kia Nurse (10), Mercedes Russell (22), Leslie Robinson (34)
- 2019: Asia Durr (2), Han Xu (14), Megan Huff (26)
- 2020: Sabrina Ionescu (1), Megan Walker (9), Jazmine Jones (12), Kylee Shook (13), Leaonna Odom (15), Erica Ogwumike (26; traded to Minnesota)
- 2021: Michaela Onyenwere (6), DiDi Richards (17), Valerie Higgins (25), Marine Fauthoux (29)
- 2022: Nyara Sabally (5), Sika Koné (29)
- 2023: Okako Adika (30)
- 2024: Marquesha Davis (11), Esmery Martinez (17), Jessika Carter (23), Kaitlyn Davis (35)
- 2025: Adja Kane (38)

=== Trades ===
- December 15, 1999: The Liberty acquired Michele Van Gorp from the Portland Fire in exchange for Portland agreeing to select Sophia Witherspoon and Coquese Washington in the expansion draft.
- May 28, 2000: The Liberty traded Carolyn Jones-Young to the Portland Fire in exchange for Tari Phillips.
- February 24, 2006: The Liberty traded the 9th overall pick in the 2006 draft to the Indiana Fever in exchange for Kelly Schumacher and the 12th overall pick in the 2006 draft.
- April 4, 2007: The Liberty traded Becky Hammon and a second-round pick in the 2008 draft to the San Antonio Silver Stars in exchange for draft rights to Jessica Davenport and a first-round pick in the 2008 draft.
- June 20, 2007: The Liberty traded Sherill Baker to the Los Angeles Sparks in exchange for Lisa Willis.
- May 7, 2008: The Liberty traded a third-round pick in the 2009 draft to the Phoenix Mercury in exchange for Leilani Mitchell.
- May 5, 2009: The Liberty traded a first-round pick in the 2010 draft to the Los Angeles Sparks in exchange for Sidney Spencer.
- March 30, 2010: The Liberty traded Shameka Christon and Cathrine Kraayeveld to the Chicago Sky in exchange for a second-round pick in the 2010 draft and Cappie Pondexter and Kelly Mazzante from the Phoenix Mercury. Phoenix received Candice Dupree from Chicago as part of this trade.
- April 11, 2011: The Liberty traded Angel Robinson to the Minnesota Lynx in exchange for Jessica Breland and a second-round pick in the 2012 draft.
- April 11, 2011: The Liberty traded Kalana Greene to the Connecticut Sun in exchange for Sydney Colson.
- May 27, 2011: The Liberty acquired Quanitra Hollingsworth from the Minnesota Lynx in exchange for the right to swap third-round picks in the 2012 draft.
- August 4, 2011: The Liberty traded Sidney Spencer to the Phoenix Mercury in exchange for Kara Braxton.
- February 27, 2013: The Liberty traded Kia Vaughn to the Washington Mystics in exchange for a second-round pick in the 2013 draft.
- March 1, 2013: The Liberty traded Janel McCarville to the Minnesota Lynx and Nicole Powell plus a third-round pick in the 2013 draft to the Tulsa Shock. In exchange, the Liberty received Deanna Nolan, a second-round pick in the 2013 draft, and a third-round pick in the 2013 draft.
- April 15, 2013: The Liberty traded Quanitra Hollingsworth to the Washington Mystics in exchange for the 25th overall pick in the 2013 draft.
- April 14, 2014: The Liberty traded Kelsey Bone, Alyssa Thomas and a first-round pick in the 2015 draft to the Connecticut Sun in exchange for Tina Charles.
- July 9, 2014: The Liberty traded DeLisha Milton-Jones to the Atlanta Dream in exchange for Swin Cash.
- February 16, 2015: The Liberty traded Cappie Pondexter to the Chicago Sky in exchange for Epiphanny Prince.
- April 16, 2015: The Liberty traded Alex Montgomery to the San Antonio Stars in exchange for the 9th overall pick in the 2015 draft. The Liberty also traded Anna Cruz and 16th and 35th overall picks to the Minnesota Lynx in exchange for the 11th, 23rd and 28th overall picks in the 2015 draft.
- May 2, 2016: The Liberty traded a second-round pick in the 2017 draft to the Atlanta Dream in exchange for Shoni Schimmel.
- May 11, 2016: The Liberty traded a first-round pick in the 2017 draft to the Dallas Wings in exchange for Amanda Zahui B. and a second-round pick in the 2017 draft.
- January 30, 2017: The Liberty traded Carolyn Swords and a first-round pick in the 2017 draft to the Seattle Storm in exchange for Kia Vaughn and Bria Hartley.
- April 11, 2019 : The Liberty traded their second round pick in the 2020 draft to Minnesota Lynx in exchange for Tanisha Wright.
- April 11, 2020: The Liberty engaged in a three team trade where the team acquired the 13th pick in the 2020 draft and sent Sugar Rodgers to Las Vegas.
- April 17, 2020: The Liberty traded the draft rights to Erica Ogwumike to Minnesota in exchange for Stephanie Talbot.
- April 17, 2020: The Liberty acquired the draft rights for Jocelyn Willoughby from Phoenix in exchange for Shatori Walker-Kimbrough.
- February 10, 2021: The Liberty traded Kia Nurse and Megan Walker to Phoenix in exchange for the 6th pick in the 2021 draft and the Mercury's first-round pick in the 2022 draft.
- February 10, 2021: The Liberty traded the 1st overall pick in the 2021 draft, a second-round pick in the 2022 draft, and their second-round 2022 Draft pick to Seattle in exchange for Natasha Howard.
- February 10, 2021: The Liberty traded the rights to Stephanie Talbot to Seattle in exchange for Sami Whitcomb.
- April 11, 2022: The Liberty traded their Second Round pick in the 2023 draft to Seattle in exchange for the rights to Lorela Cubaj.
- June 8, 2022: The Liberty traded Asia Durr to Atlanta in exchange for Megan Walker and the rights to Raquel Carrera.
- January 16, 2023 The Liberty traded Rebecca Allen, the 6th pick in the 2023 draft, Natasha Howard, and Crystal Dangerfield as part of a three team trade and received Jonquel Jones and Kayla Thornton.
- February 11, 2023 The Liberty traded Michaela Onyenwere as part of a four team trade and received the rights to Leonie Fiebich, Chicago's second round pick in the 2024 draft, and the rights to swap first-round picks in the 2025 draft with Phoenix.
- March 14, 2024 The Liberty traded their second round picks in the 2025 and 2026 WNBA draft in exchange for Rebekah Gardner.
- March 16, 2025 The Liberty traded their first round picks in the 2025 and 2026 WNBA draft in exchange for Natasha Cloud

=== All-Stars ===
- 1999: Kym Hampton, Vickie Johnson, Rebecca Lobo, Teresa Weatherspoon
- 2000: Tari Phillips, Teresa Weatherspoon, Sue Wicks
- 2001: Vickie Johnson, Tari Phillips, Teresa Weatherspoon
- 2002: Tari Phillips, Teresa Weatherspoon
- 2003: Becky Hammon, Tari Phillips, Teresa Weatherspoon
- 2004: Becky Hammon
- 2005: Becky Hammon, Ann Wauters
- 2006: None
- 2007: None
- 2008: No All-Star Game
- 2009: Shameka Christon
- 2010: Cappie Pondexter
- 2011: Essence Carson, Cappie Pondexter
- 2012: No All-Star Game
- 2013: Cappie Pondexter
- 2014: Tina Charles, Cappie Pondexter
- 2015: Tina Charles
- 2016: No All-Star Game
- 2017: Tina Charles, Sugar Rodgers
- 2018: Tina Charles
- 2019: Tina Charles, Kia Nurse
- 2020: No All-Star Game
- 2021: Betnijah Laney
- 2022: Natasha Howard, Sabrina Ionescu
- 2023: Sabrina Ionescu, Breanna Stewart, Courtney Vandersloot
- 2024: Sabrina Ionescu, Jonquel Jones, Breanna Stewart
- 2025: Sabrina Ionescu, Breanna Stewart

=== Olympians ===
- 2016: Tina Charles
- 2020: Rebecca Allen (AUS), Han Xu (CHN), Marine Johannès (FRA)
- 2024: Sabrina Ionescu, Breanna Stewart, Leonie Fiebich (GER), Nyara Sabally (GER)

=== Honors and awards ===
- 1997 All-WNBA Second Team: Rebecca Lobo
- 1997 All-WNBA Second Team: Teresa Weatherspoon
- 1997 Defensive Player of the Year: Teresa Weatherspoon
- 1998 All-WNBA Second Team: Teresa Weatherspoon
- 1998 Defensive Player of the Year: Teresa Weatherspoon
- 1999 All-WNBA Second Team: Teresa Weatherspoon
- 2000 All-WNBA Second Team: Teresa Weatherspoon
- 2000 Most Improved Player: Tari Phillips
- 2001 Kim Perrot Sportsmanship Award: Sue Wicks
- 2002 All-WNBA Second Team: Tari Phillips
- 2005 All-WNBA Second Team: Becky Hammon
- 2007 Most Improved Player: Janel McCarville
- 2007 All-Defensive Second Team: Loree Moore
- 2010 All-WNBA First Team: Cappie Pondexter
- 2010 Most Improved Player: Leilani Mitchell
- 2010 All-Defensive First Team: Cappie Pondexter
- 2010 All-Rookie Team: Kalana Greene
- 2011 All-WNBA Second Team: Cappie Pondexter
- 2011 Most Improved Player: Kia Vaughn
- 2012 All-WNBA First Team: Cappie Pondexter
- 2013 All-Rookie Team: Kelsey Bone
- 2014 All-WNBA Second Team: Tina Charles
- 2015 Coach of the Year: Bill Laimbeer
- 2015 All-Rookie Team: Brittany Boyd
- 2015 All-Rookie Team: Kiah Stokes
- 2015 All-Defensive Second Team: Tina Charles
- 2015 All-Defensive Second Team: Kiah Stokes
- 2015 All-Defensive Second Team: Tanisha Wright
- 2015 All-WNBA First Team: Tina Charles
- 2015 All-WNBA Second Team: Epiphanny Prince
- 2016 Peak Performer (Points): Tina Charles
- 2016 Peak Performer (Rebounds): Tina Charles
- 2016 All-Defensive Second Team: Tanisha Wright
- 2017 WNBA Sixth Woman of the Year: Sugar Rodgers
- 2020 All-Rookie Team: Jazmine Jones
- 2021 All-Rookie Team: Michaela Onyenwere
- 2021 All-Rookie Team: DiDi Richards
- 2021 Rookie of the Year: Michaela Onyenwere
- 2022 All-WNBA Second Team: Sabrina Ionescu
- 2023 Peak Performer (Assists): Courtney Vandersloot
- 2023 All-Defensive first team: Breanna Stewart
- 2023 All-Defensive second team: Betnijah Laney
- 2023 WNBA MVP: Breanna Stewart
- 2023 All-WNBA First Team: Breanna Stewart
- 2023 All-WNBA Second Team: Sabrina Ionescu
- 2023 WNBA Executive of the Year: Jonathan Kolb
- 2024 WNBA Finals MVP: Jonquel Jones
- 2024 All-Rookie Team: Leonie Fiebich
- 2024 All-WNBA First Team: Breanna Stewart
- 2024 All-WNBA Second Team: Sabrina Ionescu
- 2024 All-WNBA Second Team: Jonquel Jones
- 2024 All-Defensive First Team: Breanna Stewart
- 2024 All-Defensive Second Team: Jonquel Jones
- 2025 All-WNBA Second Team: Sabrina Ionescu
- 2025 All-Defensive Second Team: Breanna Stewart

==== New York Emmy Awards ====
Year	Category	Nominated work	Result	Ref.
2025	Sports Promotion (Single Shot)	New York Ain’t for Everybody by The New York Liberty	Won	
2025	Sports Story - Short Form Content (Up to 10 Minutes)	New York Liberty Fans Are Just Different – Liberty Unlocked	Nominated	

== Media coverage ==
On March 12, 2024, it was announced that Liberty games would be broadcast on WNYW and WWOR beginning with the 2024 season.

On June 4, 2024, the Liberty launched their direct-to-consumer service "Liberty Live", which would be the streaming home of the New York Liberty.

Previously, games had been broadcast on MSG Network and the YES Network. Broadcasters for the Liberty games are Chris Shearn and Julianne Viani.

Some Liberty games are broadcast nationally on CBS (WCBS-TV), Ion Television (WPXN-TV), ESPN, ESPN2, ABC (WABC-TV), NBA TV, Amazon Prime Video, NBC (WNBC), USA, Peacock or NBCSN.

=== New York Emmy Awards ===
Media partners of the New York Liberty have been nominated for New York Sports Emmy Awards for their coverage of the New York Liberty.

Year	Category	Media Partner	Nominated work	Result	Ref.
2025	Sports Promotion (Campaign)	WNYW-TV	New York Liberty On Fox 5 & My9 2024 Season	Nominated	
2025	Special Event Coverage - Live	WNYW-TV	NY Liberty Parade of Champions	Nominated	
2025	Special Event Coverage - Live - Spanish	WNJU Telemundo 47	WNJU NY Liberty Championship Parade	Nominated	

== Notes ==
Sporting positions
Preceded by None	WNBA Eastern Conference co-champions with Houston Comets; 1997	Succeeded by No title awarded
Preceded by No title awarded	WNBA Eastern Conference champions 1999, 2000	Succeeded by Charlotte Sting
Preceded by Charlotte Sting	WNBA Eastern Conference champions 2002	Succeeded by Detroit Shock
