= 2006 New York Liberty season =

- Head coach: Pat Coyle
- Arena: Madison Square Garden

Results
- Record: 11–23 (.324)
- Place: 5th (Eastern)
- Playoff finish: Did not qualify

The 2006 New York Liberty season was the 10th season for the New York Liberty franchise of the WNBA, and their second full season under head coach, Pat Coyle. The team finished the season with the worst record in franchise history, at 11-23.

== Offseason ==
- In the 2006 WNBA Expansion Draft, the Chicago Sky selected DeTrina White from the New York Liberty.

=== WNBA draft ===
Round	Pick	Player	Nationality	School/Club team
1	12	Sherill Baker (G)	United States	Georgia
2	23	Brooke Queenan (F)	United States	Boston College
3	37	Christelle N'Garsanet (C)	Ivory Coast	Missouri

== Regular season ==
=== Season standings ===
Eastern Conference	W	L	PCT	GB	Home	Road	Conf.
z - Connecticut Sun	26	8	.765	–	14–3	12–5	15–5
x - Detroit Shock	23	11	.676	3.0	14–3	9–8	14–6
x - Indiana Fever	21	13	.618	5.0	12–5	9–8	12–8
x - Washington Mystics	18	16	.529	8.0	13–4	5–12	12–8
e - New York Liberty	11	23	.324	15.0	7–10	4–13	7–13
e - Charlotte Sting	11	23	.324	15.0	7–10	4–3	6–14
e - Chicago Sky	5	29	.147	21.0	3–14	2–15	4–16

=== Season schedule ===
Date	Opponent	Score	Result	Record
May 20	@ Connecticut	74-91	Loss	0-1
May 23	@ Washington	60-95	Loss	0-2
May 30	@ Indiana	70-91	Loss	0-3
June 1	@ Detroit	63-64	Loss	0-4
June 3	Los Angeles	89-79 (OT)	Win	1-4
June 7	Connecticut	60-75	Loss	1-5
June 9	@ Houston	62-97	Loss	1-6
June 10	@ San Antonio	71-67	Win	2-6
June 13	Indiana	78-80 (OT)	Loss	2-7
June 16	Houston	58-72	Loss	2-8
June 17	@ Washington	70-88	Loss	2-9
June 21	Washington	72-66	Win	3-9
June 24	@ Minnesota	93-83	Win	4-9
June 27	Charlotte	67-73	Loss	4-10
June 30	San Antonio	78-91	Loss	4-11
July 6	Sacramento	58-79	Loss	4-12
July 7	@ Chicago	73-78	Loss	4-13
July 9	Phoenix	88-94 (OT)	Loss	4-14
July 14	@ Seattle	66-86	Loss	4-15
July 16	@ Phoenix	70-80	Loss	4-16
July 18	@ Los Angeles	62-70	Loss	4-17
July 20	@ Sacramento	62-71	Loss	4-18
July 22	Seattle	54-89	Loss	4-19
July 24	Connecticut	71-89	Loss	4-20
July 25	@ Chicago	79-72	Win	5-20
July 29	@ Charlotte	85-80	Win	6-20
July 30	Minnesota	78-69	Win	7-20
August 1	@ Connecticut	52-66	Loss	7-21
August 3	Detroit	75-67	Win	8-21
August 5	Chicago	80-69	Win	9-21
August 6	@ Detroit	53-65	Loss	9-22
August 8	Indiana	44-77	Loss	9-23
August 11	Charlotte	64-62	Win	10-23
August 13	Washington	93-81	Win	11-23

== Player stats ==
Player	GP	REB	AST	STL	BLK	PTS
Shameka Christon	34	120	44	20	42	423
Becky Hammon	22	66	81	29	3	323
Cathrine Kraayeveld	34	158	32	16	15	298
Barbara Farris	34	178	51	21	5	261
Sherill Baker	34	56	35	46	2	251
Loree Moore	34	144	122	61	10	208
Erin Thorn	27	38	33	6	1	166
Kelly Schumacher	21	116	23	3	25	163
Ashley Battle	33	62	29	31	3	143
Iciss Tillis	25	55	11	10	4	86
Christelle N'Garsanet	15	18	5	5	2	27
Kiesha Brown	16	8	9	2	0	20
Emile Gomis	2	0	0	1	0	3
Ambrosia Anderson	3	2	0	1	0	0
