= 2007 New York Liberty season =

- Head coach: Pat Coyle
- Arena: Madison Square Garden

Results
- Record: 16–18 (.471)
- Place: 4th (Eastern)
- Playoff finish: Lost First Round (2–1) to Detroit Shock

The 2007 New York Liberty season was the 11th season for the New York Liberty franchise of the WNBA, and their third full season under head coach, Pat Coyle. The Liberty reached the playoffs, but they later fell to eventual conference champion Detroit Shock.

== Offseason ==
=== Dispersal Draft ===
Based on the Liberty's 2006 record, they would pick 3rd in the Charlotte Sting dispersal draft. The Liberty picked Janel McCarville.

=== WNBA draft ===
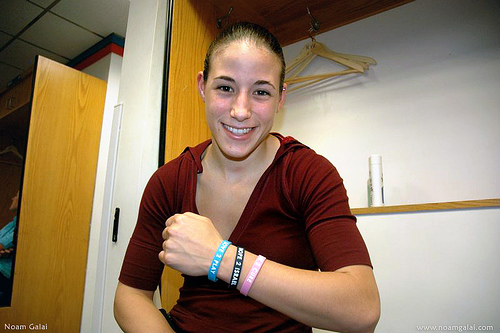
Shay Doron

Round	Pick	Player	Nationality	School/Club team
1	2	Jessica Davenport	United States	Ohio State
1	5	Tiffany Jackson	United States	Texas
2	16	Shay Doron	Israel	Maryland
3	29	Martina Weber	Germany	Iona

== Regular season ==
=== Season standings ===
Eastern Conference	W	L	PCT	GB	Home	Road	Conf.
Detroit Shock ^{x}	24	10	.706	–	12–5	12–5	14–6
Indiana Fever ^{x}	21	13	.618	3.0	12–5	9–8	12–8
Connecticut Sun ^{x}	18	16	.529	6.0	8–9	10–7	10–10
New York Liberty ^{x}	16	18	.471	8.0	10–7	6–11	10–10
Washington Mystics ^{o}	16	18	.471	8.0	8–9	8–9	8–12
Chicago Sky ^{o}	14	20	.412	10.0	6–11	8–9	6–14

=== Season schedule ===
Date	Opponent	Score	Result	Record
May 20	Chicago	83–71	Win	1–0
May 24	Washington	81–76	Win	2–0
June 1	@ Minnesota	70–60	Win	3–0
June 3	Phoenix	83–82	Win	4–0
June 5	Indiana	78–67	Win	5–0
June 8	Detroit	57–67	Loss	5–1
June 10	@ Indiana	61–80	Loss	5–2
June 12	Washington	79–69	Win	6–2
June 15	@ Chicago	66–73	Loss	6–3
June 16	@ San Antonio	71–79	Loss	6–4
June 20	@ Connecticut	76–73	Win	7–4
June 22	San Antonio	63–70	Loss	7–5
June 24	Indiana	63–74	Loss	7–6
June 26	@ Sacramento	46–59	Loss	7–7
June 29	@ Los Angeles	80–68	Win	8–7
July 1	@ Seattle	53–84	Loss	8–8
July 6	@ Detroit	82–81 (OT)	Win	9–8
July 8	Sacramento	71–61	Win	10–8
July 12	@ Indiana	63–79	Loss	10–9
July 18	@ Detroit	82–87 (OT)	Loss	10–10
July 20	Houston	74–80	Loss	10–11
July 22	Seattle	75–77	Loss	10–12
July 26	@ Connecticut	75–79	Loss	10–13
July 29	Connecticut	61–67	Loss	10–14
July 31	Los Angeles	63–73	Loss	10–15
August 2	Minnesota	71–66	Win	11–15
August 3	@ Washington	68–80	Loss	11–16
August 7	@ Houston	77–71	Win	12–16
August 9	@ Phoenix	86–97	Loss	12–17
August 12	Detroit	85–84	Win	13–17
August 14	@ Chicago	65–77	Loss	13–18
August 16	@ Washington	73–72	Win	14–18
August 17	Connecticut	74–66	Win	15–18
August 19	Chicago	58–52	Win	16–18

== Playoffs ==
Game	Date	Opponent	Score	Result	Record
Eastern Conference Semifinals
1	August 24	Detroit	73–51	Win	1–0
2	August 26	@ Detroit	73–76	Loss	1–1
3	August 28	@ Detroit	70–71 (OT)	Loss	1–2

== Player stats ==
Player	GP	REB	AST	STL	BLK	PTS
Shameka Christon	33	149	70	34	19	368
Cathrine Kraayeveld	34	154	51	32	20	366
Janel McCarville	32	152	36	39	20	332
Loree Moore	34	138	163	75	5	327
Erin Thorn	29	87	73	25	1	281
Ashley Battle	34	126	56	35	2	252
Jessica Davenport	33	88	9	7	29	176
Tiffany Jackson	34	104	19	23	12	173
Lisa Willis	16	27	9	10	0	61
Barbara Farris	28	43	13	6	1	53
Shay Doron	7	3	0	3	0	10
Lindsay Bowen	6	2	1	0	0	9
Sherill Baker	3	1	0	0	0	5
Martina Weber	2	1	0	0	0	0

== Awards and honors ==
- Janel McCarville, WNBA Most Improved Player Award
