= 2011 Chicago Sky season =

- Head coach: Pokey Chatman
- Arena: Allstate Arena

Results
- Record: 14–20 (.412)
- Place: 5th (Eastern)
- Playoff finish: Did not qualify

Media
- Television: CN100; ESPN2, NBATV

The 2011 Chicago Sky season was the franchise's 6th season in the Women's National Basketball Association, and their first season under head coach Pokey Chatman. Sky center Sylvia Fowles finished the season as only the second player in WNBA history to average at least 20 points and 10 rebounds per game. Chatman was named the head coach and general manager, after Steven Key resigned following the 2010 season.

== Transactions ==
=== WNBA draft ===
Round	Pick	Player	Nationality	School/team/country
1	3	Courtney Vandersloot	United States	Gonzaga
2	15	Carolyn Swords	United States	Boston College
2	17	Angie Bjorklund	United States	Tennessee
3	27	Amy Jaeschke	United States	Northwestern

=== Trades and Roster Changes ===
Date	Transaction
October 29, 2010	Hired Pokey Chatman as head coach and general manager
December 28, 2010	Hired Jeff House and Christie Sides as assistant coaches
January 12, 2011	Extended Qualifying Offers to Mistie Bass and Shay Murphy
April 7, 2011	Signed Jolene Anderson to a training-camp contract
April 20, 2011	Signed Angie Bjorklund, Courtney Vandersloot, Carolyn Swords, and Amy Jaeschke to rookie-scale contracts
April 20, 2011	Traded Jia Perkins to the San Antonio Silver Stars in exchange for Michelle Snow
April 20, 2011	Signed Erin Thorn
April 22, 2011	Signed Linda Frohlich
May 24, 2011	Waived Jolene Anderson
May 27, 2011	Waived Amy Jaeschke
June 1, 2011	Traded a 2nd round pick in the 2012 WNBA draft to the Los Angeles Sparks in exchange for Lindsay Wisdom-Hylton
June 2, 2011	Waived Shameka Christon
June 21, 2011	Waived Angie Bjorklund
July 24, 2011	Signed Shay Murphy to a 7-day contract
July 31, 2011	Signed Shay Murphy to a 2nd 7-day contract
August 7, 2011	Signed Shay Murphy to a 3rd 7-day contract
August 14, 2011	Signed Shay Murphy to a 4th 7-day contract
August 21, 2011	Signed Shay Murphy to a 5th 7-day contract
August 28, 2011	Signed Shay Murphy

== Roster ==
2011 Chicago Sky roster
Players
Coaches

Pos.	No.	Nat.	Name	Height	Weight	DOB	From	Yrs
G	3	(United States)	Canty, Dominique	5' 9" (1.75m)	166 lb (75kg)	1977-03-02	Alabama	12
C	34	(United States)	Fowles, Sylvia	6' 6" (1.98m)	200 lb (91kg)	1985-10-06	LSU	3
F	33	(United States)	Kraayeveld, Cathrine	6' 3" (1.91m)	183 lb (83kg)	1981-09-30	Oregon	6
G	7	(United States)	Murphy, Shay	5' 11" (1.8m)	164 lb (74kg)	1985-04-15	USC	4
G	10	(United States)	Prince, Epiphanny	5' 9" (1.75m)	167 lb (76kg)	1988-01-11	Rutgers	1
F/C	2	(United States)	Snow, Michelle	6' 5" (1.96m)	158 lb (72kg)	1980-03-20	Tennessee	9
C	30	(United States)	Swords, Carolyn	6' 6" (1.98m)	210 lb (95kg)	1989-07-19	Boston College	R
G	5	(United States)	Thorn, Erin	5' 9" (1.75m)	144 lb (65kg)	1981-05-19	BYU	8
G	21	(United States)	Vandersloot, Courtney	5' 8" (1.73m)	130 lb (59kg)	1989-02-08	Gonzaga	R
F	14	(United States)	Wisdom-Hylton, Lindsay	6' 2" (1.88m)	186 lb (84kg)	1986-05-26	Purdue	2
F	1	(United States)	Young, Tamera	6' 2" (1.88m)	170 lb (77kg)	1986-10-30	James Madison	3

Head coach
(United States) Pokey Chatman (LSU)
Assistant coaches
(United States) Jeff House (Nazareth)
(United States) Christie Sides (Louisiana Tech)
Athletic trainer
(United States) Michelle Kania (Illinois)
Strength and conditioning coach
(United States) Ann Crosby (Western Michigan)

Legend

- (C) Team captain
- (DP) Unsigned draft pick
- (FA) Free agent
- (S) Suspended
- Injured

=== Depth ===
Pos.	Starter	Bench
C	Sylvia Fowles	Carolyn Swords
PF	Michelle Snow	Lindsay Wisdom-Hylton
SF	Tamera Young	Shay Murphy; Cathrine Kraayeveld
SG	Epiphanny Prince	Erin Thorn
PG	Courtney Vandersloot	Dominique Canty

== Schedule ==
=== Preseason ===
2011 Preseason Schedule
Total: 1–1 (Home: 1–0; Road: 0–1)

Game	Date	Time (ET)	Opponent	Score	High points	High rebounds	High assists	Location/Attendance	Record
1	May 23	11:30am	China	84-45	Sylvia Fowles (18)	Carolyn Swords (8)	Courtney Vandersloot (7)	Trinity International University; 972	1-0
2	May 26	11:30am	@ Washington	55-66	Epiphanny Prince (12)	Sylvia Fowles (6)	Epiphanny Prince (4)	Verizon Center; 9,502	1-1

=== Regular season ===
2011 Regular Season Schedule
Total: 14–20 (Home: 10–7; Road: 4–13)
June: 4–5 (Home: 3–2; Road: 1–3)

Game	Date	Time (ET)	Opponent	TV	Score	High points	High rebounds	High assists	Location/Attendance	Record
1	June 4	7:00pm	@ Indiana	CN100; FS-I	57-65	Epiphanny Prince (20)	Fowles; Kraayeveld; Snow (7)	Courtney Vandersloot (7)	Conseco Fieldhouse; 8,024	0-1
2	June 10	8:30pm	Connecticut	CN100	78-75	Sylvia Fowles (23)	Sylvia Fowles (13)	Epiphanny Prince (7)	Allstate Arena; 6,609	1-1
3	June 11	7:00pm	@ Washington	CN100	84-77	Sylvia Fowles (23)	Michelle Snow (8)	Dominique Canty (6)	Verizon Center; 11,943	2-1
4	June 17	8:30pm	New York	CN100	85-73	Sylvia Fowles (27)	Sylvia Fowles (11)	Epiphanny Prince (8)	Allstate Arena; 5,718	3-1
5	June 19	1:00pm	@ Connecticut		68-83	Sylvia Fowles (23)	Sylvia Fowles (12)	Courtney Vandersloot (6)	Mohegan Sun Arena; 6,875	3-2
6	June 21	12:00pm	@ Atlanta	SSO	68-71	Sylvia Fowles (21)	Michelle Snow (12)	Courtney Vandersloot (6)	Philips Arena; 6,154	3-3
7	June 23	8:00pm	Connecticut	CN100	107-101 (2OT)	Epiphanny Prince (25)	Michelle Snow (17)	Courtney Vandersloot (10)	Allstate Arena; 3,319	4-3
8	June 25	8:00pm	Phoenix	CN100	78-86	Sylvia Fowles (28)	Sylvia Fowles (11)	Courtney Vandersloot (4)	Allstate Arena; 5,547	4-4
9	June 28	8:00pm	San Antonio	CN100	74-84	Epiphanny Prince (19)	Sylvia Fowles (12)	Prince; Thorn (4)	Allstate Arena; 3,894	4-5

July: 5–6 (Home: 4–2; Road: 1–4)

Game	Date	Time (ET)	Opponent	TV	Score	High points	High rebounds	High assists	Location/Attendance	Record
10	July 1	10:00pm	@ Phoenix	NBATV; CN100	84-97	Epiphanny Prince (19)	Lindsay Wisdom-Hylton (8)	Epiphanny Prince (6)	US Airways Center; 9,517	4-6
11	July 5	8:00pm	Washington	CN100	78-65	Sylvia Fowles (34)	Sylvia Fowles (16)	Erin Thorn (4)	Allstate Arena; 3,187	5-6
12	July 9	8:00pm	Atlanta	CN100	81-69	Epiphanny Prince (24)	Sylvia Fowles (12)	Courtney Vandersloot (9)	Allstate Arena; 5,679	6-6
13	July 10	4:00pm	@ New York	NBATV; CN100; MSG+	73-80	Fowles; Vandersloot (14)	Sylvia Fowles (8)	Tamera Young (4)	Prudential Center; 7,315	6-7
14	July 13	12:30pm	Tulsa		74-52	Sylvia Fowles (21)	Sylvia Fowles (13)	Epiphanny Prince (6)	Allstate Arena; 13,838	7-7
15	July 16	7:30pm	@ Atlanta	NBATV; CN100; FS-S	68-76	Sylvia Fowles (20)	Michelle Snow (12)	Erin Thorn (9)	Philips Arena; 7,413	7-8
16	July 19	7:00pm	Seattle	ESPN2	78-69	Sylvia Fowles (24)	Sylvia Fowles (9)	Courtney Vandersloot (7)	Allstate Arena; 6,026	8-8
17	July 21	7:00pm	@ Indiana	NBATV; CN100; FS-I	63-77	Sylvia Fowles (21)	Michelle Snow (6)	Erin Thorn (5)	Conseco Fieldhouse; 8,050	8-9
All-Star break
18	July 26	8:00pm	Connecticut	CN100; CSN-NE	66-77	Epiphanny Prince (16)	Sylvia Fowles (12)	Tamera Young (5)	Allstate Arena; 3,091	8-10
19	July 28	8:00pm	@ Tulsa		64-55	Sylvia Fowles (14)	Michelle Snow (11)	Michelle Snow (5)	BOK Center; 4,012	9-10
20	July 30	8:00pm	Los Angeles	CN100	84-88	Erin Thorn (17)	Sylvia Fowles (9)	Epiphanny Prince (5)	Allstate Arena; 5,909	9-11

August: 5–5 (Home: 3–2; Road: 2–3)

Game	Date	Time (ET)	Opponent	TV	Score	High points	High rebounds	High assists	Location/Attendance	Record
21	August 4	12:00pm	@ New York	NBATV; MSG	49-59	Sylvia Fowles (11)	Sylvia Fowles (8)	Epiphanny Prince (3)	Prudential Center; 10,133	9-12
22	August 7	6:00pm	Indiana	CN100	88-69	Fowles; Murphy (21)	Sylvia Fowles (12)	Erin Thorn (4)	Allstate Arena; 5,794	10-12
23	August 9	7:30pm	@ Connecticut		58-69	Sylvia Fowles (19)	Tamera Young (15)	Courtney Vandersloot (3)	Mohegan Sun Arena; 6,049	10-13
24	August 12	8:30pm	Minnesota	CN100	76-79	Sylvia Fowles (28)	Sylvia Fowles (13)	Courtney Vandersloot (8)	Allstate Arena; 6,289	10-14
25	August 14	3:00pm	@ San Antonio	NBATV; CN100	85-73	Sylvia Fowles (28)	Sylvia Fowles (17)	Dominique Canty (6)	AT&T Center; 7,060	11-14
26	August 20	7:00pm	@ Washington	NBATV; CN100	71-70	Sylvia Fowles (25)	Sylvia Fowles (11)	Prince; Young (4)	Verizon Center; 10,273	12-14
27	August 23	8:00pm	Atlanta	CN100	80-83	Sylvia Fowles (20)	Sylvia Fowles (12)	Michelle Snow (3)	Allstate Arena; 2,876	12-15
28	August 26	8:30pm	Washington	CN100	80-67	Epiphanny Prince (18)	Sylvia Fowles (12)	Thorn; Vandersloot (5)	Allstate Arena; 4,434	13-15
29	August 28	6:00pm	New York	NBATV; CN100	74-73	Fowles; Thorn (17)	Sylvia Fowles (14)	Thorn; Young (4)	Allstate Arena; 5,707	14-15
30	August 30	7:00pm	@ New York	CN100; MSG+	67-71	Sylvia Fowles (22)	Sylvia Fowles (8)	Erin Thorn (4)	Prudential Center; 6,334	14-16

September: 0–4 (Home: 0–1; Road: 0–3)

Game	Date	Time (ET)	Opponent	TV	Score	High points	High rebounds	High assists	Location/Attendance	Record
31	September 4	6:00pm	Indiana	NBATV; CN100	80-88	Epiphanny Prince (21)	Sylvia Fowles (9)	Epiphanny Prince (6)	Allstate Arena; 6,199	14-17
32	September 8	8:00pm	@ Minnesota	NBATV; CN100; FS-N	69-78	Fowles; Thorn (17)	Carolyn Swords (8)	Swords; Vandersloot (4)	Target Center; 8,781	14-18
33	September 10	10:30pm	@ Los Angeles	NBATV; CN100	67-74	Sylvia Fowles (18)	Sylvia Fowles (11)	Dominique Canty (6)	STAPLES Center; 13,501	14-19
34	September 11	9:00pm	@ Seattle	NBATV; KONG	70-81	Sylvia Fowles (30)	Sylvia Fowles (13)	Erin Thorn (7)	KeyArena; 13,659	14-20

All games are viewable on WNBA LiveAccess or ESPN3.com

== Standings ==
Eastern Conference	W	L	PCT	GB	Home	Road	Conf.
Indiana Fever ^{x}	21	13	.618	–	13–4	8–9	13–9
Connecticut Sun ^{x}	21	13	.618	–	15–2	6–11	14–8
Atlanta Dream ^{x}	20	14	.588	1.0	11–6	9–8	14–8
New York Liberty ^{x}	19	15	.559	2.0	12-5	7–10	11–11
Chicago Sky ^{o}	14	20	.412	7.0	10–7	4–13	10–12
Washington Mystics ^{o}	6	28	.176	15.0	4–13	2–15	4–18

== Statistics ==
Legend
GP	Games played	GS	Games started	MPG	Minutes per game	RPG	Rebounds per game
APG	Assists per game	SPG	Steals per game	BPG	Blocks per game	PPG	Points per game
FG%	Field-goal percentage	3P%	3-point field-goal percentage	FT%	Free-throw percentage	TO	Turnovers per game
PF	Fouls per game		Team leader		League leader

=== Regular season ===
Player	GP	GS	MPG	FG%	3P%	FT%	RPG	APG	SPG	BPG	PPG
Sylvia Fowles	34	34	34.6	59.1	0.0	76.6	10.2	0.6	1.2	2.0	20.0
Epiphanny Prince	34	27	29.4	37.5	37.3	80.4	2.1	3.0	2.3	0.4	13.6
Eshaya Murphy	10	0	20.5	36.9	40.0	92.9	4.8	1.1	1.3	0.4	9.8
Tamera Young	33	19	24.0	42.5	14.3	72.4	3.8	1.3	1.1	0.3	7.9
Courtney Vandersloot	34	26	22.9	39.1	27.1	76.6	2.0	3.7	0.7	0.4	6.5
Michelle Snow	34	30	24.1	45.6	0.0	78.0	6.3	1.9	0.5	1.3	5.9
Cathrine Kraayeveld	33	15	20.6	39.5	40.9	73.3	2.6	1.2	0.6	0.2	5.9
Erin Thorn	34	7	16.8	40.5	39.5	94.7	1.7	2.4	0.3	0.1	5.4
Dominique Canty	22	8	15.0	31.8	14.3	57.6	1.2	2.0	0.5	0.1	4.1
Carolyn Swords	29	4	7.5	52.8	0.0	87.5	1.8	0.3	0.2	0.2	2.7
Lindsay Wisdom-Hylton	29	0	8.1	41.5	0.0	50.0	1.9	0.6	0.4	0.5	1.7
Angie Bjorklund	7	0	6.1	18.2	20.0	100.0	0.3	0.3	0.1	0.0	1.1

== Awards and honors ==
Recipient	Award	Date awarded	Ref.
Sylvia Fowles	Eastern Conference Player of the Week	July 18	
Sylvia Fowles	Eastern Conference Player of the Week	August 15	
Sylvia Fowles	Eastern Conference Player of the Week	August 29	
Sylvia Fowles	Eastern Conference Player of the Month - August	September 1	
Sylvia Fowles	WNBA All-Star Selection	July 20	
Sylvia Fowles	Defensive Player of the Year	September 29	
Sylvia Fowles	All-Defensive First Team	September 29	
Sylvia Fowles	All-WNBA Second Team	October 4	
Courtney Vandersloot	WNBA All-Star Selection	July 20	
Courtney Vandersloot	All-Rookie Team	September 16	
Epiphanny Prince	WNBA All-Star Selection	July 20	
