= Derek Hagan =

American football player (born 1984)

Portland State Vikings
- Title: Wide receivers coach

Personal information
- Born: September 21, 1984 (age 42); Northridge, California, U.S.
- Listed height: 6 ft 2 in (1.88 m)
- Listed weight: 210 lb (95 kg)

Career information
- High school: Palmdale (Palmdale, California)
- College: Arizona State
- NFL draft: 2006: 3rd round, 82nd overall pick

Career history

Playing
- Miami Dolphins (2006−2008); New York Giants (2008−2010); Oakland Raiders (2011); Buffalo Bills (2011); Oakland Raiders (2012); Tampa Bay Buccaneers (2013)*; Tennessee Titans (2014)
- * Offseason or practice squad member only

Coaching
- Arizona State (2018–2020) Offensive analyst; Portland State (2021−present) Wide receivers coach

Awards and highlights
- Third-team All-American (2005); First-team All-Pac-10 (2005); Second-team All-Pac-10 (2004)

Career NFL statistics
- Receptions: 148
- Receiving yards: 1,734
- Receiving touchdowns: 7
- Stats at Pro Football Reference

Derek Steven Hagan Jr. (born September 21, 1984) is an American former professional football player who was a wide receiver in the National Football League (NFL). He was selected by the Miami Dolphins in the third round of the 2006 NFL draft. He played college football for the Arizona State Sun Devils. Hagan also played for the New York Giants, Buffalo Bills, Oakland Raiders, and Tennessee Titans.

Hagan is currently a wide receivers coach for Portland State.

== Early life ==
Hagan attended Palmdale High School in Palmdale, California, where he earned all-conference honors his junior and senior seasons. He caught 65 passes for 843 yards on offense and had 23 tackles and four interceptions on defense as a junior. He caught 78 passes for a school record 1020 yards and five touchdowns as a senior, while adding nine interceptions on defense. He was the team MVP as both a junior and a senior. Hagan also triple jumped 46 feet and averaged 12 points and five rebounds in basketball. He was a team captain in two sports his senior year: football and track.

== College career ==
Hagan was recruited to Arizona State University by head coach Dirk Koetter whom he played under for two years. He is second in Pac-10 history for career receptions with 258, and in career receiving yards with 3,939. Hagan also caught a pass in 41 consecutive games to end his career, and had at least one reception in 48 of 50 career games.

He surpassed 1,000 yards receiving in each of his final three years as a Sun Devil, leading the team each time. As a senior in 2005, he was voted co-captain of the team and caught 77 passes for 1,210 yards and eight touchdowns. Hagan earned All-American honors three times and All-Pac-10 honors twice.

=== College awards and honors ===
- The Sporting News Pac-10 All-Freshman (2002)
- Honorable mention All-Pac 10 (2003)
- Biletnikoff Award semi-finalist (2004)
- Second-team All-Pac 10 (2004)
- Rivals.com second-team All-American (2004)
- Rivals.com All-Pac 10 (2004)
- Arizona State Offensive MVP (2005)
- Biletnikoff Award semi-finalist (2005)
- First-team All-Pac-10 (2005)
- Rivals.com Third-team All-American (2005)
- SI.com honorable mention All-American (2005)

== Professional career ==
Pre-draft measurables
Height	Weight	Arm length	Hand span	40-yard dash	10-yard split	20-yard split	20-yard shuttle	Vertical jump	Broad jump	Bench press
6 ft 1 3/4 in (1.87 m)	208 lb (94 kg)	31 1/2 in (0.80 m)	8 7/8 in (0.23 m)	4.48 s	1.50 s	2.58 s	4.07 s	40.0 in (1.02 m)	10 ft 4 in (3.15 m)	15 reps

=== Miami Dolphins ===
Despite his great career at ASU, Hagan had a poor showing during the Senior Bowl practices by dropping passes, which many predicted would damage his stock in the upcoming draft. He ran a 4.45 40-yard dash at the NFL Combine. He was drafted in the third round (82nd overall) of the 2006 NFL draft by the Miami Dolphins. His draft preparation with IMG was chronicled in the film Two Days in April.

Hagan spent the majority of his rookie season in 2006 as the Dolphins' fourth receiver behind starters Chris Chambers and Marty Booker and slot receiver Wes Welker. His problems with dropped passes continued throughout much of the season, and he failed to distinguish himself as a legitimate receiving threat. These drops, combined with the struggles of the Dolphins offense as a whole, resulted in a largely uneventful rookie campaign for Hagan. He finished the season with 21 catches for 221 yards and one touchdown in 14 games. The lone score came in an October 22 loss to the Green Bay Packers on a pass from Joey Harrington.

Hagan looked to get back on track in 2007 under new head coach Cam Cameron. He was given the chance to compete for playing time with the trade of Wes Welker to the New England Patriots. Hagan finished the year with 373 yards and two touchdowns in the 2007 season.

Nine weeks into the 2008 regular season, Hagan was released by the Dolphins on November 4. He had three receptions for 51 yards on the season.

=== New York Giants ===
Hagan was signed by the New York Giants on December 16, 2008, after running back Reuben Droughns was placed on injured reserve. His only touchdown that season came against the Washington Redskins.

He was released on September 4, 2010, during final roster cuts. On November 16, 2010, the Giants resigned Hagan, following injuries to Giants receivers Steve Smith and Ramses Barden. He became an unrestricted free agent after the season.

=== Oakland Raiders (first stint) ===
Hagan was signed by the Oakland Raiders on August 6, 2011. He was released on November 2, 2011, when Oakland signed former Cincinnati Bengals wide receiver T. J. Houshmandzadeh.

=== Buffalo Bills ===
Hagan signed with the Buffalo Bills on November 22, 2011. He played in four games and collected 13 reception for 138 yards and one touchdown. He was resigned by the Bills on March 19, 2012, but was let go during final cuts.

=== Oakland Raiders (second stint) ===
On September 5, 2012, Hagan was signed again by the Oakland Raiders.

=== Tampa Bay Buccaneers ===
On June 13, 2013, Hagan signed with the Tampa Bay Buccaneers. On August 26, 2013, he was released by the Buccaneers.

=== Tennessee Titans ===
Hagan was signed by the Tennessee Titans on June 17, 2014, but is now a free agent.

== Personal life ==
Hagan earned a Bachelor of Science degree in justice studies while at Arizona State University. He was a high school teammate of former Miami Dolphins safety Tyrone Culver. Hagan has a real estate practice in Chandler, Arizona.

== Coaching career ==
On April 12, 2018, Hagan was named offensive analyst for Arizona State football.

In 2021, Hagan became the wide receivers coach for Portland State.
