= 2014 Connecticut Sun season =

- Head coach: Anne Donovan
- Arena: Mohegan Sun Arena

Results
- Record: 13–21 (.382)
- Place: 6th (Eastern)
- Playoff finish: Did not qualify

Media
- Television: CSN-NE; ESPN2, NBATV

The 2014 WNBA season was the 16th season for the Connecticut Sun franchise of the Women's National Basketball Association. It was their 12th in Connecticut. Following one of the worst seasons in team history, the Sun look to bounce back with a brand new team - filled with youth.

The Sun's offseason included trading stars Tina Charles to the New York Liberty and Kara Lawson to the Washington Mystics. They also traded Sandrine Gruda to the Los Angeles Sparks for a 1st Round pick in the 2014 WNBA draft. They brought back Katie Douglas, after she spent several season with the Indiana Fever. The Sun re-signed a few key players as well, pairing them with their high draft picks, setting up a high potential season.

== Transactions ==
=== WNBA draft ===
The following are the Sun's selections in the 2014 WNBA draft.

Round	Pick	Player	Nationality	School/team/country
1	1	Chiney Ogwumike	United States	Stanford
1	11	Chelsea Gray	United States	Duke
3	25	DeNesha Stallworth	United States	Kentucky

=== Trades ===
Date	Trade	
	To Connecticut Sun	To Los Angeles Sparks
	2014 1st Round Pick and 2015 2nd Round Pick	Sandrine Gruda
	To Connecticut Sun	To Washington Mystics
	Alex Bentley	Kara Lawson
	To Connecticut Sun	To New York Liberty
	Kelsey Bone, Alyssa Thomas, and 2015 1st Round Pick	Tina Charles

=== Personnel changes ===
==== Additions ====
Player	Signed	Former team
Alex Bentley	March 12, 2014	Atlanta Dream
Katie Douglas	March 24, 2014	Free agent Signee
Kelley Cain	March 25, 2014	Free agent Signee
Keisha Hampton	April 1, 2014	Free agent Signee
Kelsey Bone	April 14, 2014	New York Liberty
Alyssa Thomas	April 14, 2014	New York Liberty/Draft Pick
DeNesha Stallworth	April 23, 2014	Draft Pick
Shenneika Smith	April 23, 2014	Free agent Signee
Yelena Leuchanka	April 24, 2014	Free agent Signee
Chiney Ogwumike	April 24, 2014	Draft Pick
Alyssa Thomas	April 28, 2014	Draft Pick

==== Subtractions ====
Player	Left	New team
Kara Lawson	March 12, 2014	Washington Mystics
Mistie Bass	March 20, 2014	Phoenix Mercury
Sandrine Gruda	March 31, 2014	Los Angeles Sparks
Tina Charles	April 14, 2014	New York Liberty
Tan White	April 16, 2014	Minnesota Lynx
Shenneika Smith	April 30, 2014	Waived
Keisha Hampton	April 30, 2014	Waived
DeNesha Stallworth	May 7, 2014	Waived
Sydney Carter	May 8, 2014	Indiana Fever
Kalana Greene	May 12, 2014	Waived
Yelena Leuchanka	May 15, 2014	Waived

== Roster ==
2014 Connecticut Sun roster
Players
Coaches

Pos.	No.	Nat.	Name	Height	Weight	DOB	From	Yrs
G	20	(United States)	Bentley, Alex	5' 7" (1.7m)	152 lb (69kg)	1990-10-27	Penn State	1
F/C	14	(United States)	Bone, Kelsey	6' 4" (1.93m)	215 lb (98kg)	1991-12-31	Texas A&M	1
C	52	(United States)	Cain, Kelley	6' 6" (1.98m)	220 lb (100kg)	1989-05-16	Tennessee	1
G/F	23	(United States)	Douglas, Katie	6' 0" (1.83m)	165 lb (75kg)	1979-05-07	Purdue	13
G	34	(United States)	Faris, Kelly	5' 11" (1.8m)	154 lb (70kg)	1991-01-16	Connecticut	1
G	15	(United States)	Gilbreath, Briana	6' 0" (1.83m)	150 lb (68kg)	1990-08-16	USC	2
F	5	(United States)	Griffin, Kelsey	6' 2" (1.88m)	179 lb (81kg)	1987-07-02	Nebraska	4
G	3	(United States)	Hightower, Allison	5' 10" (1.78m)	139 lb (63kg)	1988-04-06	LSU	4
F	16	(United States)	Hoffman, Ebony	6' 2" (1.88m)	215 lb (98kg)	1982-08-27	USC	10
G/F	4	(United States)	McCray, Danielle	5' 11" (1.8m)	170 lb (77kg)	1987-10-08	Kansas	2
G	21	(United States)	Montgomery, Renee	5' 7" (1.7m)	143 lb (65kg)	1986-12-02	Connecticut	5
F	13	(United States)	Ogwumike, Chiney	6' 4" (1.93m)	173 lb (78kg)	1992-03-21	Stanford	R
F	7	(United States)	Pedersen, Kayla	6' 4" (1.93m)	190 lb (86kg)	1989-04-14	Stanford	3
F	25	(United States)	Thomas, Alyssa	6' 2" (1.88m)	185 lb (84kg)	1992-04-12	Maryland	R

Head coach
(United States) Anne Donovan (Old Dominion)
Assistant coaches
(United States) Jennifer Gillom (Mississippi)
(United States) Steven Key (Boston University)
Athletic trainer
(United States) Jeremy Norman (Keene State)
Strength and conditioning coach
(United States) Lisa White (Stony Brook)

Legend

- (C) Team captain
- (DP) Unsigned draft pick
- (FA) Free agent
- (S) Suspended
- Injured

=== Depth ===
Pos.	Starter	Bench
C	Chiney Ogwumike	Kelsey Bone; Kelley Cain
PF	Kelsey Griffin	Kayla Pedersen
SF	Alyssa Thomas	Danielle McCray
SG	Katie Douglas	Renee Montgomery; Kelly Faris
PG	Allison Hightower	Alex Bentley

== Season standings ==
#	Eastern Conference					
#	Team	W	L	PCT	GB	GP
1	y- Atlanta Dream	19	15	.559	-	34
2	x- Indiana Fever	16	18	.471	3.0	34
3	x-Washington Mystics	16	18	.471	3.0	34
4	x-Chicago Sky	15	19	.441	4.0	34
5	e-New York Liberty	15	19	.441	4.0	34
6	e-Connecticut Sun	13	21	.382	6.0	34

== Statistics ==
Legend
GP	Games played	GS	Games started	MPG	Minutes per game	RPG	Rebounds per game
APG	Assists per game	SPG	Steals per game	BPG	Blocks per game	PPG	Points per game
FG%	Field-goal percentage	3P%	3-point field-goal percentage	FT%	Free-throw percentage	TO	Turnovers per game
PF	Fouls per game		Team leader		League leader
