= Olajuwon =

Olajuwon is a surname of Yoruba origin. Notable people with the surname include:

- Abi Olajuwon (born 1988), Nigerian-American basketball player and coach, daughter of Hakeem
- Hakeem Olajuwon (born 1963), Nigerian-American basketball player
