= Khadijah Rushdan =

American basketball player and coach

Personal information
- Born: December 5, 1988 (age 37) Wilmington, Delaware, U.S.
- Listed height: 5 ft 9 in (1.75 m)

Career information
- High school: St. Elizabeth (Wilmington, Delaware)
- College: Rutgers (2007–2012)
- WNBA draft: 2012: 2nd round, 15th overall pick
- Drafted by: Los Angeles Sparks
- Position: Guard

Career history

Coaching
- 2026–: Delaware State

Career highlights
- First-team All-Big East (2012); McDonald's All American (2007)
- Stats at Basketball Reference
Medals
Women's basketball
Representing USA
FIBA Under-18 Americas Championship
Gold medal – first place	2006 United States	Team

Khadijah Rushdan (born December 5, 1988) is an American former basketball player. She played college basketball at Rutgers, and was selected by the Los Angeles Sparks in the second round of the 2012 WNBA draft. Currently, she is the head coach of the Delaware State Hornets women's basketball team. She was inducted into the Delaware Sports Hall of Fame in 2022.

== College career ==
Rushan was a first team All-Big East selection her last year at Rutgers. Rushdan led the Big East her junior year in Assist to Turnover Ratio. She is one of two players in Rutgers women's basketball history to record a triple-double. Rushdan is only one of two players in history to accumulate over 1,000 points, 500 rebounds and 400 assists.

=== Rutgers statistics ===
Legend
GP	Games played	GS	Games started	MPG	Minutes per game
FG%	Field goal percentage	3P%	3-point field goal percentage	FT%	Free throw percentage
RPG	Rebounds per game	APG	Assists per game	SPG	Steals per game
BPG	Blocks per game	PPG	Points per game	**Bold**	Career high

Year	Team	GP	Points	FG%	3P%	FT%	RPG	APG	SPG	BPG	PPG
2007–08	Rutgers	8	3	–	–	75.0	0.8	0.4	0.4	–	0.4
2008–09	Rutgers	**34**	239	41.4	**36.0**	**80.3**	4.4	2.4	1.3	0.3	10.0
2009–10	Rutgers	32	287	39.9	23.1	78.4	4.4	3.6	**1.8**	0.4	11.0
2010–11	Rutgers	31	366	41.3	20.0	74.4	5.8	**5.2**	1.5	0.4	13.8
2011–12	Rutgers	30	**393**	**50.0**	30.0	79.1	**5.9**	3.4	1.5	**0.6**	**15.1**
Career totals		135	1288	43.1	27.8	76.4	5.8	3.4	1.4	0.4	14.5

== Professional career ==
=== Player ===
Rushdan was selected by the Los Angeles Sparks in the second round, with the 15th overall pick, of the 2012 WNBA draft. She played in the 2012 WNBA preseason. However, she strained her groin, which caused her to miss the 2012 WNBA season.

=== Coach ===
Rushdan was hired as Delaware State University women’s basketball coach on April 17, 2026.

== Other ==
She was inducted into the Delaware Sports Hall of Fame in 2022.
