= Kelley Cain =

American basketball player (born 1989)

Personal information
- Born: May 16, 1989 (age 37) Stone Mountain, Georgia, U.S.
- Listed height: 6 ft 6 in (1.98 m)
- Listed weight: 220 lb (100 kg)

Career information
- High school: St. Pius X (Atlanta, Georgia)
- College: Tennessee (2007–2011)
- WNBA draft: 2012: 1st round, 7th overall pick
- Drafted by: New York Liberty
- Playing career: 2012–present
- Position: Center

Career history
- 2012: New York Liberty
- 2014: Connecticut Sun

Career highlights
- SEC All-Defensive Team (2010); First-team All-SEC (2010); McDonald's All-American (2007)
- Stats at WNBA.com
- Stats at Basketball Reference
Medals
FIBA Under-18 Americas Championship
Gold medal – first place	2006 United States	Team

Kelley Cain (born May 16, 1989) is an American former basketball center who played in the WNBA.

== Early life and education ==
Born in Stone Mountain, Georgia, she went to St. Pius X Catholic High School (Georgia) and played collegiately for the Tennessee.

== USA Basketball ==
Cain was a member of the USA Women's U18 team which won the gold medal at the FIBA Americas Championship in Colorado Springs, Colorado. The event was held in July 2006, when the USA team defeated Canada to win the championship. Cain helped the team the gold medal, scoring 6.5 points per game. Her field goal percentage of 57.9% was second among all contestants, and her 1.75 blocks per game was tied for first (with Jayne Appel)

== Professional career ==
She was selected in the first round of the 2012 WNBA draft (7th overall) by the New York Liberty.

Cain also played for Güre Belediye Woman Basketball Club in İzmir, Turkey.

== Career statistics ==
Legend
GP	Games played	GS	Games started	MPG	Minutes per game	RPG	Rebounds per game
APG	Assists per game	SPG	Steals per game	BPG	Blocks per game	PPG	Points per game
TO	Turnovers per game	FG%	Field-goal percentage	3P%	3-point field-goal percentage	FT%	Free-throw percentage
**Bold**	Career best	°	League leader

=== WNBA ===
WNBA regular season statistics
Year	Team	GP	GS	MPG	FG%	3P%	FT%	RPG	APG	SPG	BPG	TO	PPG
2012	New York	**20**	0	**6.8**	**44.4**	—	63.6	1.5	0.1	0.1	0.2	0.5	1.2
2013	Did not play (waived)												
2014	Connecticut	8	0	5.6	25.0	—	**75.0**	1.5	0.1	**0.3**	**0.5**	**0.4**	**1.4**
**Career**	2 years, 2 teams	28	0	6.5	35.3	—	66.7	1.5	0.1	0.1	0.3	0.5	1.2

=== College ===
NCAA statistics
Year	Team	GP	Points	FG%	3P%	FT%	RPG	APG	SPG	BPG	PPG
2007–08	Tennessee	Redshirt									
2008–09	Tennessee	27	222	**61.8%**	—	41.8%	5.3	0.6	0.4	1.8	8.2
2009–10	Tennessee	**33**	**345**	60.7%	—	47.1%	**7.7**	**0.7**	**0.6**	**3.4**	**10.5**
2010–11	Tennessee	32	223	59.4%	—	**47.4%**	5.4	0.6	0.4	2.1	7.0
**Career**		92	790	60.6%	—	45.6%	6.2	0.6	0.5	2.5	8.6
