= Angie Bjorklund =

American basketball player (born 1989)

Personal information
- Born: July 14, 1989 (age 37) Spokane Valley, Washington, U.S.
- Listed height: 6 ft 0 in (1.83 m)

Career information
- High school: University (Spokane Valley, Washington)
- College: Tennessee (2007–2011)
- WNBA draft: 2011: 2nd round, 17th overall pick
- Drafted by: Chicago Sky
- Position: Forward

Career history
- 2011: Chicago Sky

Career highlights
- NCAA champion (2008); First-team All-SEC (2010); SEC Freshman of the Year (2008); SEC All-Freshman Team (2008); McDonald's All-American (2007)
- Stats at Basketball Reference
Medals
Women's basketball
Representing the United States
FIBA Under-19 World Cup
Gold medal – first place	2007 Slovakia	Team

Angela Deanne Bjorklund (born July 14, 1989) is an American former NCAA basketball player for the Tennessee Lady Vols. She played professionally for the Chicago Sky, who drafted her in the 2011 WNBA draft. Her older sister, Jami, was a forward for Kelly Graves' Gonzaga Bulldogs women's basketball team from 2005 to 2009, playing alongside Sky teammate at the time; Courtney Vandersloot.

== High school career ==
Bjorklund attended University High School in Spokane Valley, Washington.

Bjorklund was named a WBCA All-American. She participated in the 2007 WBCA High School All-America Game, where she scored eleven points.

== USA Basketball ==
In 2007, Bjorklund was a member of the USA Women's U19 team which won the gold medal at the FIBA U19 World Championship in Bratislava, Slovakia. The event was held in July and August 2007, when the USA team defeated Sweden to win the championship. Bjorklund helped the team the gold medal, scoring 7.4 points per game.

== College career ==
Bjorklund became the 10th Lady Vol freshman to start their basketball career in the starting lineup. She played all 38 games during her freshman season, where Tennessee won the National Championship against Stanford by a final score of 64–48, earning Pat Summitt her eighth and eventually, final National Championship as head coach. Bjorklund finished her college career with 300 3-pointers, becoming the Lady Vols all-time 3 points record, which was previously held by Shanna Zolman, who had 266 3-pointers in her career.

In 2011, she became the 29th Lady Vol ever selected in the WNBA draft.

== Post basketball career ==
Bjorklund was hired as the Santa Clara University Director of Women's Basketball Operations position prior to the 2013–14 season under Jennifer Mountain, who was assistant coach during her sister Jami's freshman, sophomore, and junior years at Gonzaga. She has also been a graduate assistant coach and a sport psychologist at the University of Idaho.

In 2025, she was inducted into the Hooptown USA Hall of Fame.

== Personal life ==
Bjorklund comes from a family of athletics. Her sister is Jami Bjorklund, who also played high school and college basketball. Their Uncle Steve Ranniger played basketball at Oregon; grandfather Duane Ranniger played basketball at Washington State; and grandfather Leon Bjorklund ran track at Washington. Her parents are Jim and Kris Bjorklund. In addition to basketball, she also played soccer and volleyball throughout most of her childhood.

She has a bachelor's degree in psychology from the University of Tennessee and a Master's degree in sport psychology from the University of Idaho.

She currently lives in Spain with her partner Rosó Buch, a Spanish basketball player.

== Career statistics ==
Legend
GP	Games played	GS	Games started	MPG	Minutes per game	RPG	Rebounds per game
APG	Assists per game	SPG	Steals per game	BPG	Blocks per game	PPG	Points per game
TO	Turnovers per game	FG%	Field-goal percentage	3P%	3-point field-goal percentage	FT%	Free-throw percentage
**Bold**	Career best	°	League leader

*	Denotes season(s) in which Bjorklund won an NCAA Championship

=== WNBA ===
WNBA regular season statistics
Year	Team	GP	GS	MPG	FG%	3P%	FT%	RPG	APG	SPG	BPG	TO	PPG
2011	Chicago	7	0	6.1	18.2	20.0	100.0	0.3	0.3	0.1	0.0	0.3	1.1
**Career**	1 year, 1 team	7	0	6.1	18.2	20.0	100.0	0.3	0.3	0.1	0.0	0.3	1.1

=== College ===
NCAA statistics
Year	Team	GP	Points	FG%	3P%	FT%	RPG	APG	SPG	BPG	PPG
2007–08 *	Tennessee	**38**	318	38.6	36.8	**87.0**	**3.2**	1.4	0.8	0.1	8.4
2008–09	Tennessee	28	344	38.2	40.8	79.2	3.0	2.6	**1.1**	**0.3**	12.3
2009–10	Tennessee	35	**487**	41.7	42.7	74.4	2.7	**2.9**	0.9	0.2	**13.9**
2010–11	Tennessee	31	320	**43.5**	**45.1**	76.0	2.6	2.2	0.8	**0.3**	10.3
**Career**		132	1469	40.5	41.3	78.5	2.9	2.2	0.9	0.2	11.1
