= Katelan Redmon =

American basketball player (born 1988)

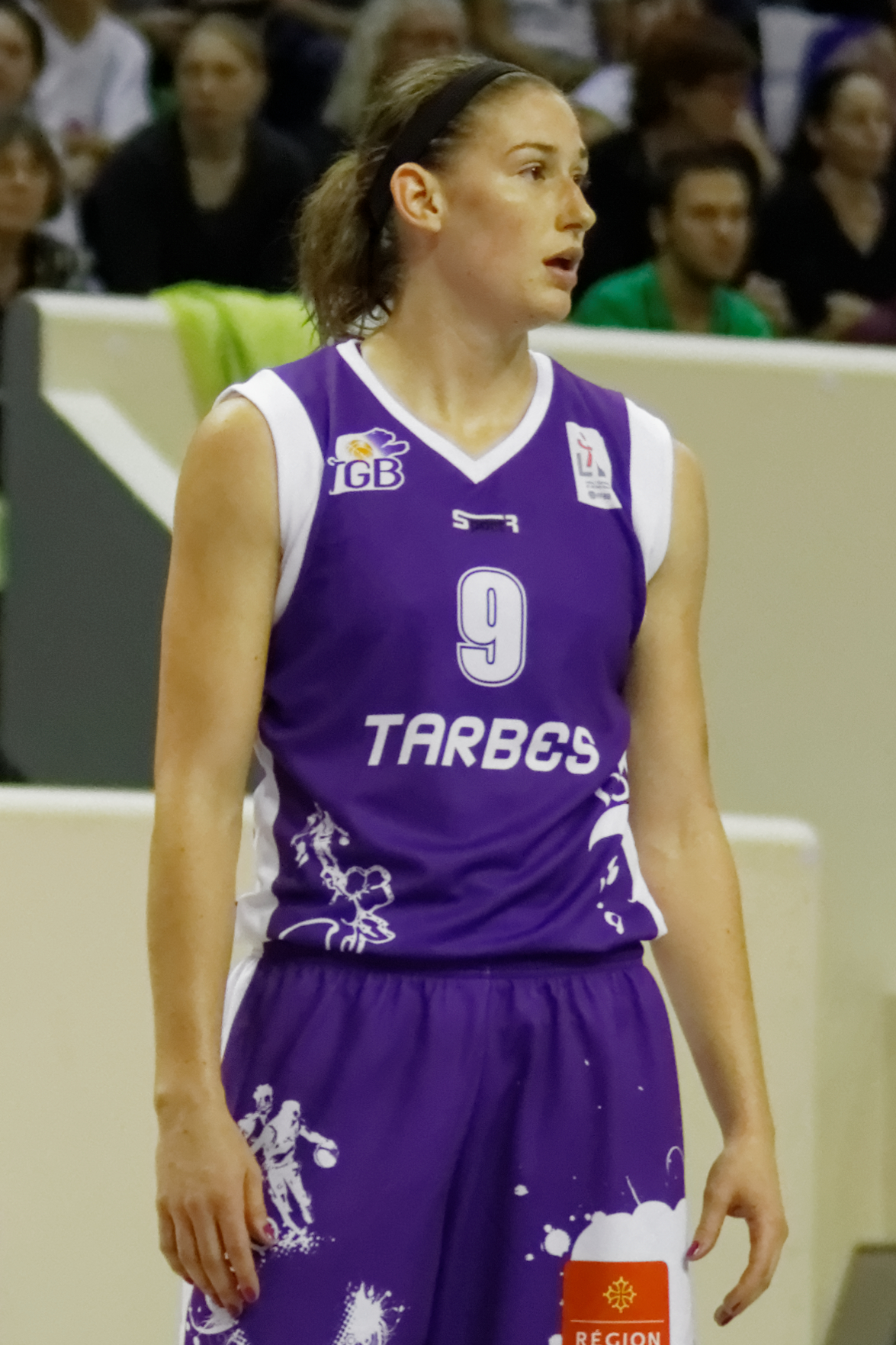
- Redmon in 2013

Personal information
- Born: October 11, 1988 (age 38) Moscow, Idaho
- Listed height: 6 ft 1 in (1.85 m)

Career information
- High school: Lewis and Clark (Spokane, Washington)
- College: Washington (2007–2008); Gonzaga (2009–2012)
- WNBA draft: 2012: 3rd round, 36th overall pick
- Drafted by: New York Liberty
- Playing career: 2012–2013
- Position: Guard / forward

Career history
- 2012: New York Liberty

Career highlights
- 2x All-WCC (2011, 2012); WCC Rookie of the Year (2010); Pac-12 All-Freshman Team (2008)
- Stats at WNBA.com
- Stats at Basketball Reference

Katelan Lea Redmon (born October 11, 1988) is a former American professional basketball player who played for the New York Liberty in the Women's National Basketball Association (WNBA).

== USA Basketball ==
Redmon was selected to represent the USA at the 2011 Pan American Games held in Guadalajara, Mexico. The USA team lost their first two games in close contests, losing to Argentina 58–55 and Puerto Rico 75–70. The team rebounded to win their games against Mexico and Jamaica, but the 2–2 overall record left them in seventh place. Redmon averaged 6.5 points per game.

== Career statistics ==
Legend
GP	Games played	GS	Games started	MPG	Minutes per game	RPG	Rebounds per game
APG	Assists per game	SPG	Steals per game	BPG	Blocks per game	PPG	Points per game
TO	Turnovers per game	FG%	Field-goal percentage	3P%	3-point field-goal percentage	FT%	Free-throw percentage
**Bold**	Career best	°	League leader

=== WNBA ===
WNBA regular season statistics
Year	Team	GP	GS	MPG	FG%	3P%	FT%	RPG	APG	SPG	BPG	TO	PPG
2012	New York	7	0	6.0	21.4	0.0	50.0	1.1	0.3	0.4	0.0	0.4	1.0
**Career**	1 year, 1 team	7	0	6.0	21.4	0.0	50.0	1.1	0.3	0.4	0.0	0.4	1.0

=== College ===
NCAA statistics
Year	Team	GP	Points	FG%	3P%	FT%	RPG	APG	SPG	BPG	PPG
2007–08	Washington	31	365	39.9	29.4	68.9	4.5	1.5	0.9	0.1	11.8
2009–10	Gonzaga	32	355	**53.1**	**31.6**	69.8	4.1	1.0	0.8	0.2	11.1
2010–11	Gonzaga	**36**	**600**	53.0	26.5	83.5	**6.2**	**2.3**	**1.4**	0.2	**16.7**
2011–12	Gonzaga	34	457	48.9	16.7	**81.3**	5.8	1.6	0.8	0.2	13.4
**Career**		133	1777	48.8	28.3	77.5	5.2	1.6	1.0	0.2	13.4
