= Palmdale High School =

Location
- 2137 E. Ave. R Palmdale, California 93550; United States; 34°34′26″N 118°05′21″W

Information
- School type: Public High School
- Motto: Choose Education, Choose Success!
- Established: 1956; 70 years ago
- NCES School ID: 060282000205
- Principal: Eric Stanford
- Teaching staff: 104.43 (FTE)
- Grades: 9 to 12
- Enrollment: 2,358 (2023–2024)
- Student to teacher ratio: 22.58
- Campus size: 80 acres (320,000 m^{2})
- Colors: Green; Black
- Website: www.phsfalcons.org

Palmdale High School is located in Palmdale, California and is part of the Antelope Valley Union High School District. Palmdale High School was founded in 1956.

== Notable alumni ==
- Edniesha Curry, basketball player and coach
- Josh Shaw, professional football player
- Arthur V. Evans, entomologist.
- Afroman American Rapper/singer/songwriter/preacher
- Steve Knight, American politician, military veteran and police officer
- Randy Kutcher, professional baseball player
- Dana Eveland, professional baseball player
- Michael Tonkin, professional baseball player
- Derek Hagan, professional football player
- Tyrone Culver, professional football player
- Larenz Tate, actor
- Davon House, professional football player
- Eugena Washington, model
