= 2004 Los Angeles Sparks season =

- Head coach: Michael Cooper; Karleen Thompson and Ryan Weisenberg (co-interim coaches)
- Arena: Staples Center

Results
- Record: 25–9 (.735)
- Place: 1st (Western)
- Playoff finish: Lost First Round (2-1) to Sacramento Monarchs

The 2004 WNBA season was the eighth for the Los Angeles Sparks. The Sparks' head coach, Michael Cooper, left the team during the season. Despite with that, the team finished in first place in the West, but they were unable to make another playoff run, losing in the opening round to the Sacramento Monarchs.

== Offseason ==
=== Dispersal Draft ===
Based on the Sparks' 2003 record, they would pick 2nd in the Cleveland Rockers dispersal draft. The Sparks picked Isabelle Fijalkowski.

=== WNBA draft ===
Round	Pick	Player	Nationality	College/School/Team
1	12	Christi Thomas (F)	United States	Georgia
2	25	Doneeka Lewis (G)	United States	LSU

== Regular season ==
=== Season standings ===
Western Conference	W	L	PCT	GB	Home	Road	Conf.
Los Angeles Sparks ^{x}	25	9	.735	–	15–2	10–7	16–6
Seattle Storm ^{x}	20	14	.588	5.0	13–4	7–10	13–9
Minnesota Lynx ^{x}	18	16	.529	7.0	11–6	7–10	12–10
Sacramento Monarchs ^{x}	18	16	.529	7.0	10–7	8–9	12–10
Phoenix Mercury ^{o}	17	17	.500	8.0	10–7	7–10	11–11
Houston Comets ^{o}	13	21	.382	12.0	9–8	4–13	7–15
San Antonio Silver Stars ^{o}	9	25	.265	16.0	6–11	3–14	6–16

=== Season schedule ===
Date	Opponent	Score	Result	Record
May 22	@ Seattle	67-93	Loss	0-1
May 25	@ Washington	95-79	Win	1-1
May 27	@ Connecticut	73-82	Loss	1-2
May 29	@ Detroit	63-60	Win	2-2
June 1	Seattle	73-70	Win	3-2
June 3	@ Sacramento	51-68	Loss	3-3
June 5	@ Houston	71-75	Loss	3-4
June 9	Charlotte	82-68	Win	4-4
June 11	Minnesota	69-55	Win	5-4
June 14	Connecticut	76-74 (OT)	Win	6-4
June 18	@ Phoenix	76-74	Win	7-4
June 20	@ Charlotte	63-68 (OT)	Loss	7-5
June 22	@ New York	65-49	Win	8-5
June 25	@ Indiana	67-71	Loss	8-6
June 27	@ Minnesota	83-67	Win	9-6
June 29	New York	69-65 (OT)	Win	10-6
July 2	San Antonio	87-80 (OT)	Win	11-6
July 7	Phoenix	73-71	Win	12-6
July 9	@ San Antonio	66-61	Win	13-6
July 10	@ Houston	59-56	Win	14-6
July 17	Sacramento	70-79	Loss	14-7
July 19	Indiana	82-51	Win	15-7
July 21	Washington	96-76	Win	16-7
July 23	Houston	70-67	Win	17-7
July 29	@ Sacramento	85-80 (OT)	Win	18-7
July 31	@ San Antonio	79-67	Win	19-7
September 1	San Antonio	77-69	Win	20-7
September 3	Seattle	82-81	Win	21-7
September 8	@ Phoenix	58-72	Loss	21-8
September 9	Detroit	81-63	Win	22-8
September 12	Sacramento	65-52	Win	23-8
September 14	Phoenix	73-60	Win	24-8
September 17	Minnesota	66-78	Loss	24-9
September 18	@ Seattle	83-80	Win	25-9

== Playoffs ==
Game	Date	Opponent	Score	Result	Record
Western Conference Semifinals
1	September 24	@ Sacramento	52-72	Loss	0-1
2	September 26	Sacramento	71-57	Win	1-1
3	September 28	Sacramento	58-73	Loss	1-2

== Awards and honors ==
- Lisa Leslie, WNBA Most Valuable Player Award
- Lisa Leslie, WNBA Defensive Player of the Year Award
- Lisa Leslie, WNBA Peak Performer (rebounds)

== Player stats ==
Player	GP	REB	AST	STL	BLK	PTS
Lisa Leslie	34	336	88	50	98	598
Mwadi Mabika	31	122	75	36	3	445
Nikki Teasley	34	116	207	43	7	336
Tamecka Dixon	32	110	112	36	1	311
Tamika Whitmore	34	106	17	12	5	210
DeLisha Milton-Jones	19	90	31	23	10	186
Christi Thomas	31	120	23	18	14	165
Laura Macchi	25	61	14	21	6	152
Doneeka Lewis	24	22	16	10	2	43
Raffaella Masciadri	17	5	8	1	0	28
Teresa Weatherspoon	34	29	32	12	1	17
Monique Coker	3	1	3	0	1	3
Mfon Udoka	3	3	0	0	0	1
