= Erin Thorn =

American basketball player (born 1981)

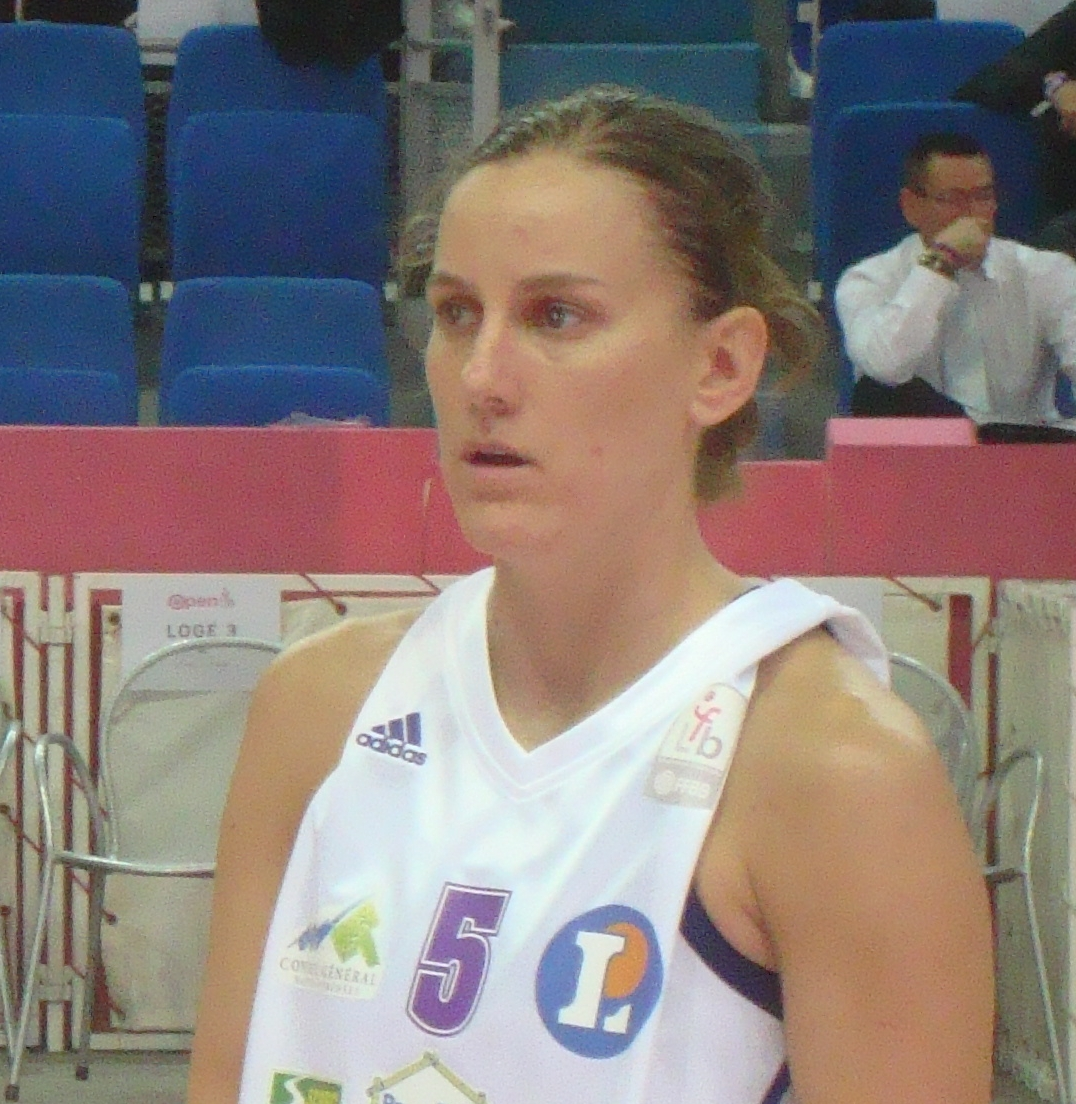

Personal information
- Born: May 19, 1981 (age 45) Orem, Utah, U.S.
- Listed height: 5 ft 9 in (1.75 m)
- Listed weight: 144 lb (65 kg)

Career information
- High school: Mountain View (Orem, Utah)
- College: BYU (1999–2003)
- WNBA draft: 2003: 2nd round, 17th overall pick
- Drafted by: New York Liberty
- Playing career: 2003–2013
- Position: Guard

Career history
- 2003–2008: New York Liberty
- 2009–2011: Chicago Sky
- 2012: Minnesota Lynx
- 2013: Indiana Fever

Career highlights
- MWC Tournament MVP (2002); 3× First-team All-MWC (2001-2003); MWC All-Freshman Team (2000); MWC Freshman of the Year (2000)
- Stats at WNBA.com
- Stats at Basketball Reference

Erin Thorn (born May 19, 1981) is an American former professional basketball player.

Born in Orem, Utah, Thorn earned Ms. Basketball honors for the state of Utah in 1999. After accepting a scholarship to Brigham Young University, Thorn was a four-year starter at shooting guard for the women's basketball team. She graduated in 2003 with a degree in Fitness and Wellness Management.

2003 to 2013, she played with several teams in the Women's National Basketball Association.

== BYU statistics ==
Legend
| GP | Games played | GS | Games started | MPG | Minutes per game |
| FG% | Field goal percentage | 3P% | 3-point field goal percentage | FT% | Free throw percentage |
| RPG | Rebounds per game | APG | Assists per game | SPG | Steals per game |
| BPG | Blocks per game | PPG | Points per game | **Bold** | Career high |

| Year | Team | GP | Points | FG% | 3P% | FT% | RPG | APG | SPG | BPG | PPG |
|---|---|---|---|---|---|---|---|---|---|---|---|
| 1999-00 | BYU | 31 | 409 | 42.1 | **43.3** | 81.4 | 3.5 | 3.7 | 2.0 | 0.5 | 13.2 |
| 2000-01 | BYU | 32 | 496 | 41.7 | 39.7 | 85.1 | **4.5** | 3.2 | 1.5 | 0.2 | 15.5 |
| 2001-02 | BYU | **33** | 572 | 43.8 | 40.9 | 83.5 | 4.0 | 3.5 | 1.8 | 0.2 | 17.3 |
| 2002-03 | BYU | 31 | **584** | **44.5** | 41.1 | **91.6** | 4.2 | **5.7** | **2.1** | 0.5 | **18.8** |
| Career | BYU | 127 | 2061 | 43.1 | 41.2 | 86.0 | 4.0 | 4.0 | 1.9 | 0.4 | 16.2 |

== Professional career ==
Thorn was selected by the New York Liberty in the second round (17th overall pick) of the 2003 WNBA draft, on April 25, 2003. She became a starter in 2007 after Vickie Johnson and Becky Hammon departed the Liberty. Thorn was named WNBA Eastern Conference Player of the Week for the week ending May 29, 2007.

In 2009 WNBA offseason, Thorn was signed as a free agent by the Chicago Sky and in the 2012 WNBA offseason agreed to a contract with the Minnesota Lynx. She currently plays for Tarbes GB in France. In the offseason, she has been serving as an assistant coach for her alma mater, Brigham Young University.

She later played for Tarbes GB in Tarbes, France.

== WNBA career statistics ==
Legend
| GP | Games played | GS | Games started | MPG | Minutes per game | RPG | Rebounds per game |
| APG | Assists per game | SPG | Steals per game | BPG | Blocks per game | PPG | Points per game |
| TO | Turnovers per game | FG% | Field-goal percentage | 3P% | 3-point field-goal percentage | FT% | Free-throw percentage |
| **Bold** | Career best | ° | League leader |

=== Regular season ===
| Year | Team | GP | GS | MPG | FG% | 3P% | FT% | RPG | APG | SPG | BPG | TO | PPG |
|---|---|---|---|---|---|---|---|---|---|---|---|---|---|
| 2003 | New York | 23 | 0 | 7.9 | .310 | .242 | **1.000** | 0.5 | 0.7 | 0.2 | 0.0 | 0.6 | 1.9 |
| 2004 | New York | 17 | 1 | 9.2 | .267 | .290 | .500 | 0.5 | 0.5 | 0.2 | 0.1 | 0.5 | 2.0 |
| 2005 | New York | 21 | 0 | 9.7 | .389 | .345 | **1.000** | 0.7 | 0.6 | 0.2 | 0.0 | 0.3 | 2.7 |
| 2006 | New York | 27 | 1 | 14.0 | .417 | **.431** | .903 | 1.4 | 1.2 | 0.2 | 0.0 | 0.7 | 6.1 |
| 2007 | New York | 29 | **29** | **30.4** | .424 | .390 | .735 | **3.0** | **2.5** | **0.9** | 0.0 | 1.7 | **9.7** |
| 2008 | New York | 32 | 5 | 11.9 | .340 | .268 | .909 | 0.6 | 1.1 | 0.2 | 0.1 | 0.6 | 3.2 |
| 2009 | Chicago | **34** | 0 | 17.0 | **.424** | .402 | .909 | 1.6 | 1.6 | 0.6 | 0.0 | 0.9 | 6.2 |
| 2010 | Chicago | **34** | 0 | 20.1 | .412 | .420 | .889 | 1.9 | 2.1 | 0.6 | 0.1 | 1.3 | 6.3 |
| 2011 | Chicago | **34** | 7 | 16.8 | .405 | .395 | .947 | 1.7 | 2.4 | 0.3 | 0.1 | 1.7 | 5.4 |
| 2012 | Minnesota | 26 | 0 | 7.5 | .362 | .353 | **1.000** | 0.9 | 0.9 | 0.2 | 0.0 | 0.5 | 2.0 |
| 2013 | Indiana | 6 | 0 | 11.2 | .167 | .167 | **1.000** | 0.5 | 0.7 | 0.3 | **0.2** | 0.8 | 1.2 |
| Career | 11 years, 4 teams | 283 | 43 | 15.1 | .395 | .370 | .883 | 1.3 | 1.5 | 0.4 | 0.0 | 1.0 | 4.8 |

=== Playoffs ===
| Year | Team | GP | GS | MPG | FG% | 3P% | FT% | RPG | APG | SPG | BPG | TO | PPG |
|---|---|---|---|---|---|---|---|---|---|---|---|---|---|
| 2004 | New York | 2 | 0 | 1.5 | **1.000** | **1.000** | .000 | 0.0 | 0.0 | 0.0 | 0.0 | 0.0 | 1.5 |
| 2005 | New York | 2 | 0 | 5.0 | .500 | .000 | .000 | 0.0 | 0.0 | 0.0 | 0.0 | 0.0 | 1.0 |
| 2007 | New York | 3 | 3 | **24.7** | .455 | .375 | .000 | **3.0** | **2.0** | **0.7** | 0.0 | 1.0 | **4.3** |
| 2008 | New York | **6** | 0 | 10.3 | .583 | .571 | .857 | 0.3 | 1.0 | 0.2 | 0.0 | 0.8 | 4.0 |
| 2012 | Minnesota | **6** | 0 | 3.0 | .667 | .600 | **1.000** | 0.3 | 0.2 | 0.0 | **0.2** | 0.5 | 2.7 |
| Career | 5 years, 2 teams | 19 | 3 | 8.8 | .571 | .524 | .875 | 0.7 | 0.7 | 0.2 | 0.1 | 0.6 | 3.1 |
