= 2010 Chicago Sky season =

5th season of WNBA

- Head coach: Steven Key
- Arena: Allstate Arena

Results
- Record: 14–20 (.412)
- Place: 6th (Eastern)
- Playoff finish: Did not qualify

Media
- Television: CN100; NBATV, ESPN2

The 2010 WNBA season was the 5th season for the Chicago Sky of the Women's National Basketball Association. This was the first season for the Sky in Allstate Arena. The Sky previously played at UIC Pavilion.

== Transactions ==
=== Sacramento Monarchs Dispersal Draft ===
With the Sacramento Monarchs ceasing operation and based on the 2009 records of teams, the Sky selected 4th in the Dispersal Draft.

Pick	Player	Nationality	College	Previous team
4	Courtney Paris	United States	Oklahoma	Sacramento Monarchs

=== WNBA draft ===
Round	Pick	Player	Nationality	School/team/country
1	4	Epiphanny Prince	United States	Rutgers
3	28	Abi Olajuwon	Nigeria	Oklahoma

=== Trades and Roster Changes ===
Date	Transaction
January 11, 2010	Extended Qualifying Offers to Candice Dupree and Mistie Bass
January 30, 2010	Traded Candice Dupree to the Phoenix Mercury and the 16th Pick in the 2010 WNBA draft to the New York Liberty in exchange for Shameka Christon and Cathrine Kraayeveld in a 3-Team Deal
February 3, 2010	Signed Dominique Canty
April 13, 2010	Waived Mistie Bass
April 13, 2010	Signed Epiphanny Prince and Abi Olajuwon to Rookie Scale Contracts
April 16, 2010	Signed Sandora Irvin to a Training Camp Contract
April 20, 2010	Signed Kristi Cirone to a Training Camp Contract
April 25, 2010	Signed Sami Whitcomb and Larrissa Williams to Training Camp Contracts
May 2, 2010	Waived Shyra Ely and Kristi Cirone
May 9, 2010	Waived Sami Whitcomb and Larrissa Williams
May 12, 2010	Waived Courtney Paris
May 13, 2010	Traded Kristi Toliver to the Los Angeles Sparks in exchange for a 2nd round Pick in the 2011 WNBA draft
May 31, 2010	Exercised 4th-Year Team Option on Sylvia Fowles and Tamera Young
June 1, 2010	Waived Abi Olajuwon
July 22, 2010	Waived Sandora Irvin
July 22, 2010	Signed Eshaya Murphy to a 7-Day Contract
July 29, 2010	Signed Eshaya Murphy to a 2nd 7-Day Contract
August 5, 2010	Signed Eshaya Murphy to a 3rd 7-Day Contract
August 12, 2010	Signed Eshaya Murphy to a 4th 7-Day Contract
August 19, 2010	Signed Eshaya Murphy
September 10, 2010	Head coach Steven Key resigns as coach and general manager

== Roster ==
2010 Chicago Sky roster
Players
Coaches

Pos.	No.	Nat.	Name	Height	Weight	From
F	8	(United States)	Bass, Mistie	6' 3" (1.91m)	184 lb (83kg)	Duke
G/F	3	(United States)	Canty, Dominique	5' 9" (1.75m)	162 lb (73kg)	Alabama
SF	20	(United States)	Christon, Shameka (injured)	6' 1" (1.85m)	170 lb (77kg)	Arkansas
C	34	(United States)	Fowles, Sylvia	6' 6" (1.98m)	200 lb (91kg)	LSU
F	33	(United States)	Kraayeveld, Cathrine	6' 4" (1.93m)	180 lb (82kg)	Oregon
G	14	(United States)	Murphy, Eshaya	5' 11" (1.8m)	164 lb (74kg)	USC
SG	11	(United States)	Perkins, Jia	5' 8" (1.73m)	155 lb (70kg)	Texas Tech
G	10	(United States)	Prince, Epiphanny	5' 9" (1.75m)	168 lb (76kg)	Rutgers
C	32	(United States)	Thomas, Christi	6' 4" (1.93m)	198 lb (90kg)	Georgia
SG	5	(United States)	Thorn, Erin	5' 10" (1.78m)	150 lb (68kg)	BYU
F	1	(United States)	Young, Tamera	6' 2" (1.88m)	170 lb (77kg)	James Madison

Head coach
(United States) Steven Key (Boston University)
Assistant coaches
(United States) Mike Mitchell (Colorado State)
(United States) Stephanie White (Purdue)
Athletic trainer
(United States) Michelle Kania
Strength and conditioning coach
(United States) Ann Crosby

Legend

- (C) Team captain
- (DP) Unsigned draft pick
- (FA) Free agent
- (S) Suspended
- Injured

WNBA roster page

=== Depth ===
Pos.	Starter	Bench
C	Sylvia Fowles	Christi Thomas
PF	Mistie Bass	Catherine Kraayeveld
SF	Tamera Young	Eshaya Murphy; Shameka Christon
SG	Jia Perkins	Erin Thorn
PG	Dominique Canty	Epiphanny Prince

== Schedule ==
=== Preseason ===
2010 Preseason Schedule
Total: 3–1 (Home: 2–0; Road: 1–1)

Game	Date	Time (ET)	Opponent	Score	High points	High rebounds	High assists	Location/Attendance	Record
1	April 30	1:00pm	@ Minnesota	87-78	Tamera Young (18)	Mistie Bass (7)	Sami Whitcomb (5)	Concordia University; 633	1-0
2	May 6	12:30pm	Minnesota	74-65	Catherine Kraayeveld (20)	Bass; Kraayeveld; Irvin (6)	Dominique Canty (6)	Allstate Arena; N/A	2-0
3	May 7	12:00pm	@ Indiana	63-69	Kristi Toliver (14)	Mistie Bass (8)	Mistie Bass (2)	Conseco Fieldhouse; 7,291	2-1
4	May 10	12:30pm	Indiana	84-71	Sylvia Fowles (13)	Sylvia Fowles (7)	Dominique Canty (6)	Allstate Arena; N/A	3-1

=== Regular season ===
2010 Regular Season Schedule
Total: 14–20 (Home: 7–10; Road: 7–10)
May 2–4 (Home: 1–1; Road: 1–3)

Game	Date	Time (ET)	Opponent	TV	Score	High points	High rebounds	High assists	Location/Attendance	Record
1	May 15	3:30pm	@ Connecticut	CN100	61-74	Sylvia Fowles (16)	Sylvia Fowles (9)	Shameka Christon (4)	Mohegan Sun Arena; 8,072	0-1
2	May 16	4:00pm	@ New York	NBATV; CN100; MSG	82-85	Sylvia Fowles (23)	Dominique Canty (8)	Dominique Canty (5)	Madison Square Garden; 12,088	0-2
3	May 22	8:00pm	Indiana	CN100	86-92 (OT)	Sylvia Fowles (22)	Sylvia Fowles (12)	Dominique Canty (5)	Allstate Arena; 6,477	0-3
4	May 23	6:00pm	@ Indiana	CN100; FS-I	61-69	Catherine Kraayeveld (11)	Sylvia Fowles (9)	Fowles; Kraayeveld (2)	Conseco Fieldhouse; 7,665	0-4
5	May 27	8:00pm	Seattle	CN100	84-75	Sylvia Fowles (19)	Sylvia Fowles (8)	Dominique Canty (4)	Allstate Arena; 2,923	1-4
6	May 29	8:00pm	@ Minnesota	CN100	73-58	Sylvia Fowles (18)	Mistie Bass (6)	Canty; Prince (4)	Target Center; 6,129	2-4

June 4–5 (Home: 2–4; Road: 2–1)

Game	Date	Time (ET)	Opponent	TV	Score	High points	High rebounds	High assists	Location/Attendance	Record
7	June 4	7:00pm	@ Atlanta	CN100; FS-S	80-70	Sylvia Fowles (19)	Sylvia Fowles (9)	Shameka Christon (8)	Philips Arena; 2,515	3-4
8	June 5	8:00pm	Tulsa	CN100	95-70	Sylvia Fowles (32)	Sylvia Fowles (13)	Dominique Canty (6)	Allstate Arena; 4,549	4-4
9	June 8	8:00pm	New York	CN100	70-85	Epiphanny Prince (20)	Sylvia Fowles (6)	Christon; Young; Prince; Thorn (3)	Allstate Arena; 2,408	4-5
10	June 11	8:30pm	Washington	CN100	78-95	Sylvia Fowles (23)	Sylvia Fowles (7)	Canty; Perkins; Thorn (4)	Allstate Arena; 3,107	4-6
11	June 15	8:00pm	Atlanta	CN100	86-93	Jia Perkins (25)	Tamera Young (7)	Dominique Canty (6)	Allstate Arena; 3,292	4-7
12	June 19	7:00pm	@ Washington	NBATV; CN100; CSN-MA	61-65 (OT)	Sylvia Fowles (17)	Sylvia Fowles (9)	Jia Perkins (4)	Verizon Center; 9,034	4-8
13	June 22	7:30pm	@ Connecticut	CN100	86-77	Epiphanny Prince (19)	Sylvia Fowles (9)	Prince; Young (4)	Mohegan Sun Arena; 6,987	5-8
14	June 25	8:30pm	Washington	CN100	79-72	Jia Perkins (20)	Sylvia Fowles (7)	Dominique Canty (4)	Allstate Arena; 3,419	6-8
15	June 27	6:00pm	Indiana	CN100	70-64	Erin Thorn (15)	Sylvia Fowles (17)	Prince; Thorn (3)	Allstate Arena; 4,051	6-9

July: 6–5 (Home: 3–2; Road: 3–3)

Game	Date	Time (ET)	Opponent	TV	Score	High points	High rebounds	High assists	Location/Attendance	Record
16	July 1	8:00pm	Connecticut	CN100	92-80	Sylvia Fowles (26)	Sylvia Fowles (11)	Bass; Canty (5)	Allstate Arena; 3,061	7-9
17	July 3	7:00pm	@ Atlanta	NBATV; CN100; SSO	88-82	Sylvia Fowles (22)	Sylvia Fowles (12)	Canty; Thorn; Young (2)	Philips Arena; 6,920	8-9
18	July 6	8:00pm	Indiana	CN100	51-58	Sylvia Fowles (26)	Sylvia Fowles (18)	Epiphanny Prince (4)	Allstate Arena; 3,732	8-10
19	July 11	4:00pm	@ New York	MSG	54-57	Jia Perkins (26)	Sylvia Fowles (19)	Sylvia Fowles (3)	Madison Square Garden; 9,644	8-11
20	July 14	12:30pm	San Antonio	CN100	88-61	Fowles; Perkins; Prince (14)	Mistie Bass (7)	Canty; Prince (5)	Allstate Arena; 6,950	9-11
21	July 16	8:30pm	Los Angeles	CN100	80-68	Erin Thorn (15)	Sylvia Fowles (10)	Dominique Canty (6)	Allstate Arena; 4,841	10-11
22	July 18	4:00pm	@ Washington	CSN-MA	61-59	Sylvia Fowles (13)	Sylvia Fowles (11)	Fowles; Kraayeveld; Thorn (3)	Verizon Center; 8,790	11-11
23	July 23	8:30pm	New York	CN100	71-79	Epiphanny Prince (14)	Sylvia Fowles (16)	Dominique Canty (6)	Allstate Arena; 5,256	11-12
24	July 24	8:00pm	@ San Antonio	CN100	75-72	Sylvia Fowles (23)	Sylvia Fowles (12)	Dominique Canty (6)	AT&T Center; 8,999	12-12
25	July 27	7:00pm	@ Indiana	CN100	74-78	Sylvia Fowles (18)	Sylvia Fowles (8)	Thorn; Young (4)	Conseco Fieldhouse; 6,853	12-13
26	July 30	10:00pm	@ Seattle	NBATV; KONG	60-80	Sylvia Fowles (13)	Mistie Bass (7)	Sylvia Fowles (5)	KeyArena; 7,749	12-14

August: 2–6 (Home: 1–3; Road: 1–3)

Game	Date	Time (ET)	Opponent	TV	Score	High points	High rebounds	High assists	Location/Attendance	Record
27	August 1	6:00pm	@ Phoenix	NBATV; CN100; FS-A	96-97	Sylvia Fowles (35)	Sylvia Fowles (8)	Epiphanny Prince (5)	US Airways Center; 11,237	12-15
28	August 4	10:30pm	@ Los Angeles	NBATV; CN100	77-82	Jia Perkins (16)	Sylvia Fowles (11)	Canty; Perkins (4)	STAPLES Center; 9,732	12-16
29	August 7	3:00pm	Minnesota	ESPN2	82-87 (OT)	Jia Perkins (16)	Sylvia Fowles (11)	Dominique Canty (6)	Allstate Arena; 4,992	12-17
30	August 10	8:00pm	Phoenix		91-82	Sylvia Fowles (24)	Sylvia Fowles (14)	Young; Canty; Thorn; Prince (4)	Allstate Arena; 4,089	13-17
31	August 14	8:00pm	Atlanta	CN100	74-98	Epiphanny Prince (18)	Sylvia Fowles (9)	Epiphanny Prince (4)	Allstate Arena; 4,214	13-18
32	August 17	7:00pm	@ Atlanta	NBATV; FS-S	84-79	Sylvia Fowles (18)	Sylvia Fowles (14)	Tamera Young (5)	Philips Arena; 5,209	14-18
33	August 20	8:30pm	Connecticut	NBATV; CN100	71-78	Epiphanny Prince (19)	Sylvia Fowles (6)	Dominique Canty (7)	Allstate Arena; 5,598	14-19
34	August 21	8:00pm	@ Tulsa	NBATV; FS-OK	71-84	Sylvia Fowles (16)	Sylvia Fowles (7)	Dominique Canty (5)	BOK Center; 6,321	14-20

All games are viewable on WNBA LiveAccess

== Standings ==
Eastern Conference	W	L	PCT	GB	Home	Road	Conf.
Washington Mystics ^{x}	22	12	.647	–	13–4	9–8	13–9
New York Liberty ^{x}	22	12	.647	–	13–4	9–8	14–8
Indiana Fever ^{x}	21	13	.618	1.0	13–4	8–9	13–9
Atlanta Dream ^{x}	19	15	.559	3.0	10–7	9–8	10–12
Connecticut Sun ^{o}	17	17	.500	5.0	12–5	5–12	9–13
Chicago Sky ^{o}	14	20	.412	8.0	7–10	7–10	7–15

== Statistics ==
Legend
GP	Games played	GS	Games started	MPG	Minutes per game	RPG	Rebounds per game
APG	Assists per game	SPG	Steals per game	BPG	Blocks per game	PPG	Points per game
FG%	Field-goal percentage	3P%	3-point field-goal percentage	FT%	Free-throw percentage	TO	Turnovers per game
PF	Fouls per game		Team leader		League leader

=== Regular season ===
Player	GP	GS	MPG	FG%	3P%	FT%	RPG	APG	SPG	BPG	PPG
Sylvia Fowles	34	34	32.0	58.2	100.0	76.0	9.9	1.5	1.1	2.6	17.8
Jia Perkins	34	34	27.5	39.6	34.9	81.4	2.9	2.4	1.6	0.2	10.7
Epiphanny Prince	34	2	19.6	42.7	33.8	78.4	2.0	2.7	1.6	0.1	9.8
Dominique Canty	34	34	26.0	43.0	18.2	69.3	2.6	3.4	1.0	0.2	9.0
Shameka Christon	10	9	21.3	35.9	40.0	93.8	2.4	2.4	0.3	0.2	8.5
Tamera Young	32	22	18.6	36.2	27.7	68.4	3.1	1.6	0.8	0.2	6.8
Erin Thorn	34	0	20.1	41.2	42.0	88.9	1.9	2.1	0.6	0.1	6.3
Cathrine Kraayeveld	34	14	21.2	35.0	31.6	87.5	2.7	1.3	0.6	0.1	6.3
Shay Murphy	11	0	14.1	28.8	28.6	66.7	1.8	0.8	0.8	0.0	5.1
Mistie Bass	34	20	18.9	52.7	0.0	62.5	3.9	1.1	0.6	0.4	4.9
Sandora Irvin	18	1	7.6	46.7	14.3	66.7	1.4	0.2	0.1	0.3	1.9
Christi Thomas	15	0	8.5	40.0	0.0	50.0	1.7	0.1	0.1	0.2	1.3
Abi Olajuwon	6	0	5.0	50.0	0.0	0.0	0.7	0.0	0.2	0.0	1.0

== Awards and honors ==
Recipient	Award	Date awarded	Ref.
Sylvia Fowles	Eastern Conference Player of the Week	June 7	
Sylvia Fowles	Eastern Conference Player of the Week	July 6	
Sylvia Fowles	All-Defensive First Team	August 29	
Sylvia Fowles	All-WNBA First Team	September 13	
Sylvia Fowles	Team USA Starter	July 10	
Epiphanny Prince	WNBA All-Rookie Team	September 1	
