= Delaware State Hornets women's basketball =

Delaware State Hornets
2026–27 Delaware State Hornets women's basketball team
- University: Delaware State University
- Head coach: Khadijah Rushdan (1st season)
- Location: Dover, Delaware
- Arena: Memorial Hall (capacity: 1,800)
- Conference: MEAC
- Nickname: Hornets
- Colors: Columbia blue and red

NCAA Division I tournament appearances
- 2007

Conference tournament champions
- 2007

Conference regular-season champions
- 2004

The Delaware State Hornets women's basketball team is the basketball team that represents Delaware State University in Dover, Delaware, United States. The school's team currently competes in the Mid-Eastern Athletic Conference.

== History ==
Delaware State began play in 1976. They have won one regular season title (2004) and one tournament title (2007). In their first NCAA tournament, they lost to Vanderbilt 62–47 in the First Round.

In the 2021–22 season, the team went winless for the first time in program history, finishing with an 0–24 overall record.

== NCAA tournament results ==
Year	Seed	Round	Opponent	Result
2007	#15	First Round	#2 Vanderbilt	L 47–62
