= 2007 McDonald's All-American Girls Game =

West	East
76	105
	1st half	2nd half	Total
West	34	42	76
East	59	46	105
- Date: March 28, 2007
- Venue: Freedom Hall, Louisville, Kentucky
- MVP: Jasmine Thomas
- Referees: Alicia Dukes, Steve Meyer, Dale Ramsey
- Attendance: 11,632
- Network: ESPN

McDonald's All-American

The 2007 McDonald's All-American Girls Game was an All-star basketball game played on Wednesday, March 28, 2007, at Freedom Hall in Louisville, Kentucky, United States, home of the University of Louisville Cardinals. The game's rosters featured the best and most highly recruited high school girls graduating in 2007. The game was the 6th annual version of the McDonald's All-American Game first played in 2002.

The 48 players were selected from 2,500 nominees by a committee of basketball experts. They were chosen not only for their on-court skills, but for their performances off the court as well. Coach Morgan Wootten, who had more than 1,200 wins as head basketball coach at DeMatha High School, was chairman of the selection committee. Legendary UCLA coach John Wooden, who has been involved in the McDonald's All American Games since its inception, served as chairman of the Games and as an advisor to the selection committee.

Proceeds from the 2008 McDonald's All American High School Basketball Games went to Ronald McDonald House Charities (RMHC) of Kentuckiana and its Ronald McDonald House program.

== 2007 Game ==
The game was telecast live by ESPN. The sixth annual Girls Game kicked off an action packed evening at Freedom Hall. A crowd of nearly 12,000 fans witnessed a couple of record-breaking performances by our All American girls.

Wootten Award winner, Maya Moore (Connecticut) led the East Squad with 18 points and tied the record for most field goals in a game with eight, while Kelley Cain (Tennessee) added 10 points and a new single game record 14 rebounds.

Kayla Pedersen (Stanford) was high scorer for the West Team with 18 points. She also led the team in rebounds with 12. Other West Team notables included, Angie Bjorklund (Tennessee), who poured in 13 points and Victoria Baugh (Tennessee), who pulled down nine rebounds.

The 2007 John R. Wooden MVP Award went to Jasmine Thomas (Duke). She scored 16 points, grabbed nine rebounds and dished six assists in just 15 minutes on the court. The coaches and her All American teammates, voted Drey Mingo (Purdue) this year's Naismith Award winner for Sportsmanship during event week.

The West All Americans still lead the alltime series 4–2, but this was a memorable night for the East. They jumped out to a big halftime lead and never looked back, as they dominated the game from start to finish.

=== 2007 West Roster ===
#	Name	Height	Weight (lbs.)	Position	Hometown	High School	College Choice
22	Victoria Baugh	6-4	190	F	Sacramento, CA, U.S.	Sacramento Charter	Tennessee
12	Angie Bjorklund	6-0	165	G	Spokane Valley, WA, U.S.	University	Tennessee
20	Stefanie Gilbreath	6-0	150	G	Katy, TX, U.S.	Cinco Ranch	USC
11	Alison Jackson	5-11	140	F	Chicago, IL, U.S.	Fenwick	Ohio State
42	Amy Jaeschke	6-5	210	C	Wilmette, IL, U.S.	New Trier Township	Northwestern
50	Italee Lucas	5-8	150	G	North Las Vegas, NV, U.S.	Centennial	North Carolina
14	Kayla Pedersen	6-4	195	F	Fountain Hills, AZ, U.S.	Red Mountain	Stanford
15	Devereaux Peters	6-2	165	F	Chicago, IL, U.S.	Fenwick	Notre Dame
53	Ta'Shia Phillips	6-6	220	C	Indianapolis, IN, U.S.	Brebeuf Jesuit Prep	Xavier
32	Jeanette Pohlen	6-0	165	G	Brea, CA, U.S.	Brea-Olinda	Stanford
51	Lenita Sanford	6-3	170	F	Inglewood, CA, U.S.	Lynwood	California
21	Tyra White	6-0	155	F	Kansas City, MO, U.S.	Hickman Mills	LSU

=== 2007 East Roster ===
#	Name	Height	Weight (lbs.)	Position	Hometown	High School	College Choice
52	Kelley Cain	6-6	220	C	Atlanta, GA, U.S.	St. Pius X Catholic	Tennessee
24	Ashley Cimino	6-3	175	F	Yarmouth, ME, U.S.	Catherine McAuley	Stanford
23	Cetera DeGraffenreid	5-5	135	G	Cullowhee, NC, U.S.	Smoky Mountain	North Carolina
3	Lorin Dixon	5-4	125	G	Springfield Gardens, NY, U.S.	Christ the King	Connecticut
42	Jantel Lavender	6-4	215	C	Euclid, OH, U.S.	Cleveland Central Catholic	Ohio State
33	Drey Mingo	6-2	187	F	Atlanta, GA, U.S.	Marist School	Maryland
32	Maya Moore	6-0	165	F	Lawrenceville, GA, U.S.	Collins Hill	Connecticut
21	Erica Morrow	5-9	147	G	Brooklyn, NY, U.S.	Murry Bergtraum	Syracuse
5	Khadijah Rushdan	5-9	165	G	New Castle, DE, U.S.	St. Elizabeth	Rutgers
20	Marah Strickland	5-11	161	G	Mt. Airy, MD, U.S.	Towson Catholic	Maryland
15	Jasmine Thomas	5-9	140	G	Fairfax, VA, U.S.	Oakton	Duke
34	Krystal Thomas	6-5	187	F	Windermere, FL, U.S.	The First Academy	Duke

=== Coaches ===
The West team was coached by:

- Head Coach Donna Moir of Sacred Heart Academy (Louisville, Kentucky)
- Asst Coach Betsy Cowan of Sacred Heart Academy (Louisville, Kentucky)
- Asst Coach Bob Tonini of Sacred Heart Academy (Louisville, Kentucky)

The East team was coached by:

- Head Coach Chad Gilbert of Jeffersonville High School (Jeffersonville, Indiana)
- Asst Coach Greg Wright of Jeffersonville High School (Jeffersonville, Indiana)
- Asst Coach Steve Wright of Jeffersonville High School (Jeffersonville, Indiana)

=== Boxscore ===
==== Visitors: West ====
##	Player	FGM/A	3PM/A	FTM/A	Points	Off Reb	Def Reb	Tot Reb	PF	Ast	TO	BS	ST	Min
12	*Angie Bjorklund	5/16	2/ 9	1/ 2	13	2	0	2	2	2	4	1	2	23
14	*Kayla Pedersen	8/15	0/ 2	2/ 3	18	7	5	12	1	0	2	1	0	22
22	*Victoria Baugh	3/ 8	0/ 0	2/ 5	8	4	5	9	2	0	2	1	1	20
50	*Italee Lucas	1/12	1/ 4	0/ 1	3	3	3	6	1	0	4	0	1	17
53	*Ta'Shia Phillips	4/ 8	0/ 0	2/ 6	10	5	2	7	1	0	1	2	0	19
11	Alison Jackson	3/ 7	0/ 0	0/ 0	6	0	1	1	1	1	3	0	0	17
15	Devereaux Peters	0/ 4	0/ 1	1/ 2	1	2	3	5	0	1	3	2	0	17
20	Stefanie Gilbreath													
21	Tyra White	4/12	0/ 5	2/ 4	10	1	2	3	0	1	1	1	1	17
32	Jeanette Pohlen	0/ 6	0/ 2	3/ 4	3	0	5	5	4	2	2	0	0	18
42	Amy Jaeschke	2/ 6	0/ 2	0/ 1	4	0	6	6	0	1	0	0	1	16
51	Lenita Sanford	0/ 2	0/ 0	0/ 0	0	2	4	6	1	0	2	0	2	14
	Team					2	2	4						
	TOTALS	30/96	3/25	13/28	76	28	38	66	13	8	24	8	8	200

==== Home: East ====
##	Player	FGM/A	3PM/A	FTM/A	Points	Off Reb	Def Reb	Tot Reb	PF	Ast	TO	BS	ST	Min
15	*Jasmine Thomas	7/17	2/ 5	0/ 0	16	4	5	9	4	6	3	0	3	15
23	*Cetera DeGraffenreid	2/ 7	2/ 2	3/ 4	9	2	4	6	0	3	1	0	4	20
32	*Maya Moore	8/17	2/ 7	0/ 0	18	2	4	6	0	1	0	2	3	19
34	*Krystal Thomas	3/ 8	0/ 0	0/ 0	6	2	6	8	2	1	1	1	0	19
52	*Kelley Cain	5/ 9	0/ 0	0/ 0	10	6	8	14	1	1	1	1	2	15
3	Lorin Dixon	2/ 5	0/ 1	3/ 5	7	0	3	3	1	4	2	0	0	17
5	Khadijah Rushdan	0/ 5	0/ 1	4/ 4	4	2	6	8	0	4	5	0	3	16
20	Marah Strickland	5/12	2/ 4	0/ 0	12	3	1	4	1	0	3	1	0	15
21	Erica Morrow	2/ 8	0/ 1	0/ 0	4	1	2	3	1	2	0	1	3	16
24	Ashley Cimino	1/ 4	0/ 2	0/ 0	2	1	1	2	1	1	1	1	0	15
33	Drey Mingo	2/ 3	0/ 0	1/ 2	5	0	3	3	5	0	0	1	1	15
42	Jantel Lavender	6/11	0/ 0	0/ 0	12	2	2	4	2	0	3	1	0	18
	Team					2	0	2						
	TOTALS	43/106	8/23	11/15	105	27	45	72	18	23	20	9	19	200

(* = Starting Line-up)

== All-American Week ==
=== Schedule ===
- Tuesday, March 27: Powerade JamFest
  - Three-Point Shoot-out
  - Timed Basketball Skills Competition
- Wednesday, March 28: 6th Annual Girls All-American Game

The Powerade JamFest is a skills-competition evening featuring basketball players who demonstrate their skills in two crowd-entertaining ways. Since the first All-American game in 2002, players have competed in a 3-point shooting challenge and a timed basketball skills competition.

=== Contest winners ===
- The 2007 Timed Skills contest was won by Cetera DeGraffenreid.
- Italee Lucas was winner of the 2007 3-point shoot-out.

== See also ==
2007 McDonald's All-American Boys Game
