= Edniesha Curry =

American basketball player and coach (born 1979)

Personal information
- Born: July 9, 1979 (age 47) Los Angeles County, California
- Listed height: 5 ft 4 in (1.63 m)
- Listed weight: 138 lb (63 kg)

Career information
- High school: Palmdale (Palmdale, California)
- College: Cal State Northridge (1997–1999); Oregon (2000–2002)
- WNBA draft: 2002: 3rd round, 41st overall pick
- Drafted by: Charlotte Sting
- Playing career: 2002–2009
- Position: Point guard
- Number: 1, 22
- Coaching career: 2018–present

Career history

Playing
- 2003: Phoenix Mercury
- 2005: Los Angeles Sparks

Coaching
- 2015–2017: Maine (women's assistant)
- 2018–2021: Maine (men's assistant)
- 2021–2022: Portland Trail Blazers (assistant)

Career highlights
- 2x All-Big Sky (1998, 1999); Big Sky Freshman of the Year (1998)
- Stats at Basketball Reference

Edniesha Nicole Curry (born July 9, 1979) is an American basketball coach who is head coach of the Virgin Islands men's national team, and coaches for Athletes Unlimited. She is a former assistant coach for the Portland Trail Blazers of the National Basketball Association (NBA). Prior to her coaching career, she played in the Women's National Basketball Association for the Phoenix Mercury and the Los Angeles Sparks.

== Early life ==
Curry attended Palmdale High School in Palmdale, CA. She was a four-sport athlete at Palmdale, lettering three times in basketball, three times in track, two times in tennis, and once in cross country. Curry later attended California State University Northridge where she graduated as the all time leader in 3-point baskets. She then transferred to the University of Oregon in 2000 where she received a degree in sociology. She received a Pacific Conference honorable mention in her first season with their women's basketball team in 2002, in which she averaged 9.8 points per game and accumulated 104 assists throughout the season.

In 2002, Curry was drafted by the WNBA's Charlotte Sting. She spent eight years as a professional athlete, playing for the Sting, the Phoenix Mercury, the Los Angeles Sparks, and for teams in Europe and the Middle East as well.

== Playing career ==
Curry was drafted in the third round of the WNBA draft by the Charlotte Sting in 2002. However, she was waived by the Sting prior to playing a regular-season game. Curry played in the WNBA for two seasons: in 2003 for the Phoenix Mercury and in 2005 for the Los Angeles Sparks.

Curry also played basketball professionally overseas. From 2003 to 2004, she played for Ra’ananna in Israel. From 2004 to 2005, she played for Thessaloniki in Greece and was named an All-Star. From 2005 to 2006, Curry played for BSE-ESMA Budapest (Hungary-A) Eurocup in Budapest, Hungary, and appeared in FIBA Cup Europe. She spent the 2007-2008 season with Hapoel Tel Aviv and Lezno Poland. Curry played her final season of professional basketball from 2008 to 2009 for Elitzur Holon in Israel, and was an Israeli Cup Semi-Finalist. She played on the international tour of Athens, Thessaloniki, Greece, Israel, Hungary and Poland.

== Coaching career ==
Curry was an international basketball development coach in Israel, China, and Vietnam from 2012 to 2015 including head coach for SSA Basketball in Ho Chi Minh City. In July 2015, she joined the University of Maine's women's basketball team as a player development and assistant coach. At the University of Maine she worked under Coach Richard Barron until May 2017. She left the University of Maine in 2017 to serve in the Assistant Coaches' Program and the Atlanta Classical Academy as their Women's Athletic Program Manager. In 2018, Curry returned as an assistant coach for the University of Maine's men's basketball team.

On August 2, 2021, Curry was hired by the Portland Trail Blazers to work as an assistant coach during the 2021–22 NBA season. She was not rehired prior to the 2022 season.

== Awards ==
Curry led the Cal State Northridge women's basketball team in scoring for three consecutive seasons. At Northridge, Curry was selected as a member of the Big Sky Conference team in 1998 and in 1999. She currently holds the university's record for 3-point baskets made (168).

== Career statistics ==
Legend
GP	Games played	GS	Games started	MPG	Minutes per game	RPG	Rebounds per game
APG	Assists per game	SPG	Steals per game	BPG	Blocks per game	PPG	Points per game
TO	Turnovers per game	FG%	Field-goal percentage	3P%	3-point field-goal percentage	FT%	Free-throw percentage
**Bold**	Career best	°	League leader

=== WNBA career statistics ===
==== Regular season ====
Year	Team	GP	GS	MPG	FG%	3P%	FT%	RPG	APG	SPG	BPG	TO	PPG
2003	Phoenix	**20**	0	**10.3**	**37.1**	22.7	**66.7**	0.6	**1.2**	0.5	0.0	0.8	1.7
2005	Los Angeles	13	0	8.7	30.4	**37.5**	50.0	**0.8**	0.9	0.5	**0.1**	0.8	**1.8**
Career	2 years, 2 teams	33	0	9.6	34.5	28.9	55.6	0.7	1.1	0.5	0.0	0.8	1.7

==== Playoffs ====
Year	Team	GP	GS	MPG	FG%	3P%	FT%	RPG	APG	SPG	BPG	TO	PPG
2005	Los Angeles	25	2	8.0	0.0	0.0	0.0	0.5	0.5	0.5	0.0	2.5	0.0
Career	1 year, 1 team	25	2	8.0	0.0	0.0	0.0	0.5	0.5	0.5	0.0	2.5	0.0

=== College ===
Year	Team	GP	GS	MPG	FG%	3P%	FT%	RPG	APG	SPG	BPG	TO	PPG
1997–98	Cal State Northridge	28	-	-	38.0	32.7	66.7	**4.3**	4.2	2.0	0.3	-	17.0
1998–99	Cal State Northridge	**29**	-	-	**41.9**	**38.8**	**80.5**	3.6	3.2	2.0	0.1	-	**18.4**
1999–00	Cal State Northridge	16	-	-	36.9	30.1	64.4	3.5	4.2	**2.5**	**0.5**	-	15.3
2001–02	Oregon	32	-	-	40.0	28.2	70.9	3.0	3.3	1.9	0.1	-	9.8
**Career**		105	-	-	39.5	33.0	71.9	3.6	3.6	2.1	0.2	-	14.9
Statistics retrieved from Sports-Reference.

== Personal life ==
Curry has three brothers, two sisters, and two daughters. Curry's Stepmother was Jenoah Curry. Curry holds a bachelor science degree in sociology from the University of Oregon, and earned an MBA from American InterContinental University in 2006.

== See also ==
- List of female NBA coaches
