= Christi Thomas =

American basketball player (born 1982)

Personal information
- Born: August 14, 1982 (age 44) Marietta, Georgia, U.S.
- Listed height: 6 ft 4 in (1.93 m)
- Listed weight: 198 lb (90 kg)

Career information
- High school: Buford (Buford, Georgia)
- College: Georgia (2000–2004)
- WNBA draft: 2004: 1st round, 12th overall pick
- Drafted by: Los Angeles Sparks
- Playing career: 2004–present
- Position: Center
- Number: 32, 4

Career history
- 2004–2008: Los Angeles Sparks
- 2009: Minnesota Lynx
- 2010: Chicago Sky

Career highlights
- First-team All-SEC (2004); SEC Freshman of the Year (2001); SEC All-Freshman Team (2001); Miss Georgia Basketball (2000)
- Stats at WNBA.com
- Stats at Basketball Reference

Christi Michelle Thomas (born August 14, 1982) played professional basketball in the WNBA. She attended the University of Georgia where she played under coach Andy Landers. She has been a professional player since 2004. Christi also played basketball at Buford High School in Buford, Georgia, where she led the Buford Wolves to a State Runner-Up finish in 1999. She's 6 ft 5 in (1.91 m) and weighs 185 lb (84 kg). On January 30, 2009 Thomas was traded to the Minnesota Lynx for Vanessa Hayden-Johnson.

== WNBA career statistics ==
Legend
GP	Games played	GS	Games started	MPG	Minutes per game	RPG	Rebounds per game
APG	Assists per game	SPG	Steals per game	BPG	Blocks per game	PPG	Points per game
TO	Turnovers per game	FG%	Field-goal percentage	3P%	3-point field-goal percentage	FT%	Free-throw percentage
**Bold**	Career best	°	League leader

=== Regular season ===
Year	Team	GP	GS	MPG	FG%	3P%	FT%	RPG	APG	SPG	BPG	TO	PPG
2004	Los Angeles	31	8	17.6	.462	**.455**	.683	3.9	0.7	0.6	0.5	0.9	17.3
2005	Los Angeles	32	7	16.3	**.500**	.333	.688	3.3	0.5	2.3	**0.6**	0.8	3.8
2006	Los Angeles	27	1	**20.0**	.529	.200	.638	**5.3**	**1.0**	**0.7**	0.5	1.6	6.1
2007	Los Angeles	**34**	**19**	18.8	.481	.353	**.757**	**5.3**	0.5	0.6	0.3	0.4	**8.4**
2008	Los Angeles	20	0	8.0	.353	.167	.500	2.0	0.3	0.1	0.4	0.4	10.5
2009	Minnesota	11	0	6.0	.048	.000	.500	1.4	0.3	0.3	0.5	0.5	0.3
2010	Chicago	15	0	8.5	.400	.000	.500	1.7	0.1	0.1	0.2	0.5	1.3
Career	7 years, 3 teams	170	28	15.3	.459	.270	.684	3.7	0.6	0.5	0.4	0.9	4.6

=== Playoffs ===
Year	Team	GP	GS	MPG	FG%	3P%	FT%	RPG	APG	SPG	BPG	TO	PPG
2004	Los Angeles	3	**3**	**33.3**	.545	.000	.000	**7.7**	0.7	0.3	0.3	0.7	**8.0**
2005	Los Angeles	2	0	19.0	**.750**	**1.000**	**1.000**	1.0	**1.0**	0.0	1.0	1.0	4.0
2006	Los Angeles	**5**	0	21.4	.545	.667	.800	3.2	0.8	**0.6**	**1.2**	0.2	6.0
Career	3 years, 1 team	10	3	24.5	.563	.600	.833	4.1	0.8	0.4	0.9	0.5	6.2

== Georgia statistics ==
Legend
GP	Games played	GS	Games started	MPG	Minutes per game
FG%	Field goal percentage	3P%	3-point field goal percentage	FT%	Free throw percentage
RPG	Rebounds per game	APG	Assists per game	SPG	Steals per game
BPG	Blocks per game	PPG	Points per game	**Bold**	Career high

Year	Team	GP	Points	FG%	3P%	FT%	RPG	APG	SPG	BPG	PPG
2000-01	Georgia	29	338	51.0	18.8	62.0	6.5	0.6	0.9	1.4	11.7
2001-02	Georgia	30	311	51.5	25.0	60.2	6.2	**0.9**	1.0	1.5	10.4
2002-03	Georgia	30	**481**	53.7	**27.0**	71.2	8.0	0.7	**1.3**	**1.9**	**16.0**
2003-04	Georgia	**35**	463	**53.9**	22.7	**77.2**	**8.3**	0.8	1.1	1.5	13.2
Career	Georgia	124	1593	52.7	24.2	68.6	7.3	0.8	1.1	1.6	12.8
