= 2005 Los Angeles Sparks season =

- Head coach: Henry Bibby (13-15); Joe Bryant (4-2)
- Arena: Staples Center

Results
- Record: 17–17 (.500)
- Place: 4th (Western)
- Playoff finish: Lost First Round (2-0) to Sacramento Monarchs

The 2005 WNBA season was the ninth for the Los Angeles Sparks. Despite making the playoffs, they played mediocre basketball all season long, and they were not considered a playoff factor, as they were swept in the Conference Semifinals to eventual champion Sacramento Monarchs.

== Offseason ==
=== WNBA draft ===
Round	Pick	Player	Nationality	School/Club team
2	26	DeeDee Wheeler (G)	United States	Arizona
3	39	Heather Schreiber (F)	United States	Texas

== Regular season ==
=== Season standings ===
Western Conference	W	L	PCT	GB	Home	Road	Conf.
Sacramento Monarchs ^{x}	25	9	.735	–	15–2	10–7	17–5
Seattle Storm ^{x}	20	14	.588	5.0	14–3	6–11	13–9
Houston Comets ^{x}	19	15	.559	6.0	11–6	8–9	11–11
Los Angeles Sparks ^{x}	17	17	.500	8.0	11–6	6–11	12–10
Phoenix Mercury ^{o}	16	18	.471	9.0	11–6	5–12	12–10
Minnesota Lynx ^{o}	14	20	.412	11.0	11–6	3–14	9–13
San Antonio Silver Stars ^{o}	7	27	.206	18.0	5–12	2–15	3–19

=== Season schedule ===
Date	Opponent	Score	Result	Record
May 21	@ Seattle	68-50	Win	1-0
May 25	@ Minnesota	65-68	Loss	1-1
May 26	@ Washington	84-75	Win	2-1
May 28	@ Charlotte	75-84	Loss	2-2
May 31	San Antonio	81-70	Win	3-2
June 4	@ Sacramento	53-81	Loss	3-3
June 8	Phoenix	63-66	Loss	3-4
June 11	Sacramento	81-74	Win	4-4
June 15	Houston	83-64	Win	5-4
June 18	Minnesota	69-56	Win	6-4
June 20	Connecticut	70-90	Loss	6-5
June 24	Seattle	76-65	Win	7-5
June 26	@ Detroit	73-79	Loss	7-6
June 28	@ Indiana	61-58	Win	8-6
July 2	Phoenix	86-63	Win	9-6
July 5	New York	55-67	Loss	9-7
July 12	Charlotte	71-59	Win	10-7
July 16	Seattle	70-78	Loss	10-8
July 19	Washington	68-74	Loss	10-9
July 23	@ Houston	69-59	Win	11-9
July 26	@ Phoenix	60-77	Loss	11-10
July 29	@ Sacramento	59-79	Loss	11-11
July 31	@ Seattle	72-77	Loss	11-12
August 5	@ San Antonio	66-63	Win	12-12
August 7	@ Minnesota	72-76	Loss	12-13
August 9	@ Connecticut	51-64	Loss	12-14
August 10	@ New York	69-74	Loss	12-15
August 13	Indiana	69-59	Win	13-15
August 16	Sacramento	63-72	Loss	13-16
August 19	Detroit	74-67	Win	14-16
August 21	Houston	55-50	Win	15-16
August 23	Minnesota	74-63	Win	16-16
August 26	@ San Antonio	70-67	Win	17-16
August 27	@ Houston	51-77	Loss	17-17

== Playoffs ==
Game	Date	Opponent	Score	Result	Record
Western Conference Semifinals
1	August 31	Sacramento	72-75	Loss	0-1
2	September 2	@ Sacramento	63-81	Loss	0-2

== Player stats ==
Player	GP	REB	AST	STL	BLK	PTS
Chamique Holdsclaw	33	223	104	38	16	561
Lisa Leslie	34	248	87	67	71	517
Tamika Whitmore	34	143	42	33	14	327
Doneeka Lewis	32	47	77	18	7	178
Tamecka Dixon	30	67	77	24	2	160
Nikki Teasley	19	53	70	23	4	141
Christi Thomas	32	104	17	11	19	122
Raffaella Masciadri	33	47	23	15	1	122
Mwadi Mabika	17	27	29	15	0	99
Laura Macchi	13	18	7	8	1	63
Edniesha Curry	13	11	12	7	1	23
Jessica Moore	15	8	1	4	0	8
Marlous Nieuwveen	7	2	0	0	0	4
Gordana Grubin	9	6	5	1	0	1
