= LaSondra Barrett =

American basketball player

Personal information
- Born: March 16, 1990 (age 36) Flowood, Mississippi, U.S.
- Listed height: 6 ft 2 in (1.88 m)

Career information
- High school: Murrah (Jackson, Mississippi)
- College: LSU (2008–2012)
- WNBA draft: 2012: 1st round, 10th overall pick
- Drafted by: Washington Mystics
- Playing career: 2012–present
- Position: Forward

Career highlights
- 2× First-team All-SEC (2011, 2012); SEC Freshman of the Year (2009); SEC All-Freshman Team (2009); McDonald's All-American (2008)
- Stats at Basketball Reference
Medals
Women's basketball
Representing the United States
FIBA Under-19 World Cup
Gold medal – first place	2009 Thailand	Team

LaSondra Renee Barrett (born March 16, 1990) is an American former basketball forward who played one season for the Washington Mystics of the Women's National Basketball Association, as well as for overseas teams in Australia and Israel. She went to William B. Murrah High School and played collegiately for LSU. She is the cousin of former NFL quarterback Jason Campbell.

== LSU statistics ==
Legend
GP	Games played	GS	Games started	MPG	Minutes per game
FG%	Field goal percentage	3P%	3-point field goal percentage	FT%	Free throw percentage
RPG	Rebounds per game	APG	Assists per game	SPG	Steals per game
BPG	Blocks per game	PPG	Points per game	**Bold**	Career high

Year	Team	GP	Points	FG%	3P%	FT%	RPG	APG	SPG	BPG	PPG
2008-09	LSU	30	342	**41.7%**	0.0%	72.3%	5.7	1.3	1.0	0.5	11.4
2009-10	LSU	31	397	39.9%	31.3%	**84.4%**	**6.6**	1.7	0.8	0.4	**12.8**
2010-11	LSU	31	379	37.6%	30.3%	67.4%	6.3	2.6	0.9	**0.6**	12.2
2011-12	LSU	**34**	**435**	40.8%	**38.7%**	75.0%	7.1	**2.7**	**1.4**	0.5	12.8
Career		126	1553	39.9%	33.8%	75.3%	6.5	2.1	1.0	0.5	12.3

== USA Basketball ==
Barrett was named to the USA Women's U19 team which represented the US in the 2009 U19 World's Championship, held in Bangkok, Thailand in July and August 2009. Although the USA team lost the opening game to Spain, they went on to win their next seven games to earn a rematch against Spain in the finals, and won the game 81–71 to earn the gold medal. Barrett scored 6.0 points per game.

== WNBA ==
She was selected in the first round of the 2012 WNBA draft (10th overall) by the Washington Mystics, and played for the team for one year.

== Coaching career ==
Barrett was hired as an assistant coach for the University of Iowa women's basketball team in April 2025. This followed a three year stint as an assistant coach at Georgia Tech. Prior to Georgia Tech, Barrett was on the coaching staff at Houston, Louisiana Tech and Florida International.
