= Kristi Cirone =

American basketball player (born 1987)

Personal information
- Born: May 19, 1987 (age 39) Chicago, Illinois, U.S.
- Listed height: 5 ft 8 in (1.73 m)
- Listed weight: 136 lb (62 kg)

Career information
- High school: Resurrection (Chicago, Illinois)
- College: Illinois State (2005–2009)
- WNBA draft: 2009: undrafted
- Playing career: 2009–2010
- Position: Point guard
- Number: 10, 25
- Coaching career: 2010–present

Career history

Playing
- 2009: Connecticut Sun
- 2009: Apollon Ptolemaidos
- 2010: PTS Lider Pruszkow

Coaching
- 2010–2012: Missouri (assistant)
- 2012–2018: Judson

Career highlights
- 3× MVC Player of the Year (2007–2009); 3× First-team All-MVC (2007–2009); 3× MVC All-Defensive Team (2007–2009); MVC Tournament MVP (2008); MVC Freshman of the Year (2006); MVC All-Freshman Team (2006); No. 10 retired by Illinois State Redbirds
- Stats at Basketball Reference

Kristi Mary Rose Cirone (born May 19, 1987) is an American basketball coach and former player. She played collegiately for Illinois State University and led the school to three national postseason tournaments in 2007 through 2009 while also being named the Jackie Stiles Player of the Year all three years. After her college career, she played professionally with the WNBA's Connecticut Sun and in Europe.

== Playing career ==
=== High school career ===
Cirone grew up in Chicago and attended Resurrection High School from 2001 to 2004 where she was a four-year starter. She made the 2005 McDonald's All-America Top-100 list. One of only two juniors on 2004 IBCA First Team. 2005 Associated Press Second-Team All-State and 2004 Chicago Tribune Second-Team All-State. Advanced to 2005 IHSA State Finals in the Country Insurance Three-Point Showdown. Led Resurrection to an 85–36 record in four years and is the school's all-time leader in points (2,300), assists (414) and steals (370). She played AAU basketball for the Illinois Hustlers.

=== College career ===
==== Freshman ====
2006 Missouri Valley Conference Freshman of the Year. Missouri Valley Conference All-Freshman Team member. Led the Redbirds in assists, free throws made, three-point field goals made and tied for the team lead in steals. Four-time Valley Newcomer of the Week (11/21, 12/4, 12/19, 2/27). First player in Valley history to be both State Farm MVC Player of the Week and Newcomer of the Week (12/19). Set ISU freshman season records for three-point field goals made and free throws made. Set ISU record for most steals in a game at Redbird Arena with eight against Wichita State (1/22).

==== Sophomore ====
2007 Jackie Stiles Missouri Valley Conference Player of the Year. All-Valley First-Team, All-Defensive Team and All-MVC Scholar-Athlete Second-Team selection. Led Illinois State in scoring, field goals made and attempted, free throws made and attempted, assists, steals and minutes played. Recorded 29 double-digit scoring efforts, including 13 outings with 20 or more points. Averaged 5.58 assists per game, the top mark in the MVC. Two-time State Farm MVC Player of the Week (12/11, 1/8). Two-time Prairie Farms/MVC Scholar-Athlete of the Week (12/14, 1/11).

==== Junior ====
2008 Jackie Stiles Missouri Valley Conference Player of the Year, only the fourth player in the history of the conference to win the award in back-to-back years. All-Valley First-Team, All-Defensive Team and MVC Scholar-Athlete First-Team selection. Associated Press Honorable Mention All-American. WBCA/State Farm Honorable Mention All-American. 2008 Jill Hutchison ISU Female Athlete of the Year. Final nominee for the Nancy Lieberman Award. Team captain. Led the Redbirds in scoring, field goals made and attempted, three-point field goals made and attempted, free throws made and attempted, assists, assist-to-turnover ratio, steals and minutes. Led the nation in assist-to-turnover ratio (2.87). Three-time MVC Player of the Week (1/8, 1/15, 2/25). Four-time Prairie Farms/MVC Scholar-Athlete of the Week (1/10, 1/17, 2/26, 3/19). Best Western Roundball Classic All-Tournament Team selection. State Farm MVC Tournament MVP. Scored 22 points and had four assists in the NCAA Tournament First Round against Oklahoma (3/23).

==== Senior ====
2009 Jackie Stiles Missouri Valley Conference Player of the Year, only the second player in the history of the conference to win the award in three consecutive years. (The only other is the awards namesake, Jackie Stiles) 2009 Preseason 1st team NCAA All-American selection. ISU got the Preseason AP Poll 10th rank. She now holds the women's career scoring record for the most points at Illinois State University.

In 2019, she was inducted into the Missouri Valley Conference Hall of Fame.

==== College statistics ====
Legend
GP	Games played	GS	Games started	MPG	Minutes per game
FG%	Field goal percentage	3P%	3-point field goal percentage	FT%	Free throw percentage
RPG	Rebounds per game	APG	Assists per game	SPG	Steals per game
BPG	Blocks per game	PPG	Points per game	**Bold**	Career high

Year	Team	GP	Points	FG%	3P%	FT%	RPG	APG	SPG	BPG	PPG
2005–06	Illinois State	28	389	34.7	34.4	**80.4**	2.5	4.4	1.6	0.2	13.9
2006–07	Illinois State	33	541	42.6	35.1	77.1	3.7	5.6	1.8	0.2	16.4
2007–08	Illinois State	33	552	**48.4**	**39.8**	80.0	3.5	5.2	**2.4**	**0.3**	16.7
2008–09	Illinois State	**35**	**657**	46.6	39.5	76.2	**4.1**	**5.8**	2.3	0.2	**18.8**
Career	129	2139	43.7	37.4	78.2	3.5	5.3	2.0	0.2	16.6	

=== Professional career ===
After going undrafted in the 2009 WNBA draft, Cirone signed with the Connecticut Sun in April 2009 and was the only undrafted rookie to make a WNBA roster. She was waived on June 19 when the Sun signed Tan White. In September 2009, she signed with Apollon Ptolemaidos of the Greek A1 League but left the team a month later. In 2010, she signed a training camp contract with the Chicago Sky but was waived before the start of the season.

=== WNBA career statistics ===
Legend
GP	Games played	GS	Games started	MPG	Minutes per game	RPG	Rebounds per game
APG	Assists per game	SPG	Steals per game	BPG	Blocks per game	PPG	Points per game
TO	Turnovers per game	FG%	Field-goal percentage	3P%	3-point field-goal percentage	FT%	Free-throw percentage
**Bold**	Career best	°	League leader

==== Regular season ====
Year	Team	GP	GS	MPG	FG%	3P%	FT%	RPG	APG	SPG	BPG	TO	PPG
2009	Connecticut	4	0	5.8	40.0	33.3	66.7	1.3	1.0	0.5	0.0	0.0	1.8
Career	1 year, 1 team	4	0	5.8	40.0	33.3	66.7	1.3	1.0	0.5	0.0	0.0	1.8

== Coaching career ==
After serving as a graduate assistant coach at the University of Missouri from 2010 to 2012, Cirone was hired as the head coach of the Judson University women's basketball team. She left the school in 2018 as the third-winningest coach in program history in both wins, 82, and winning percentage (.439). She currently a head coach of the Ridgewood HS girls basketball team since 2018.
