= Keisha Hampton =

American basketball player (born 1990)

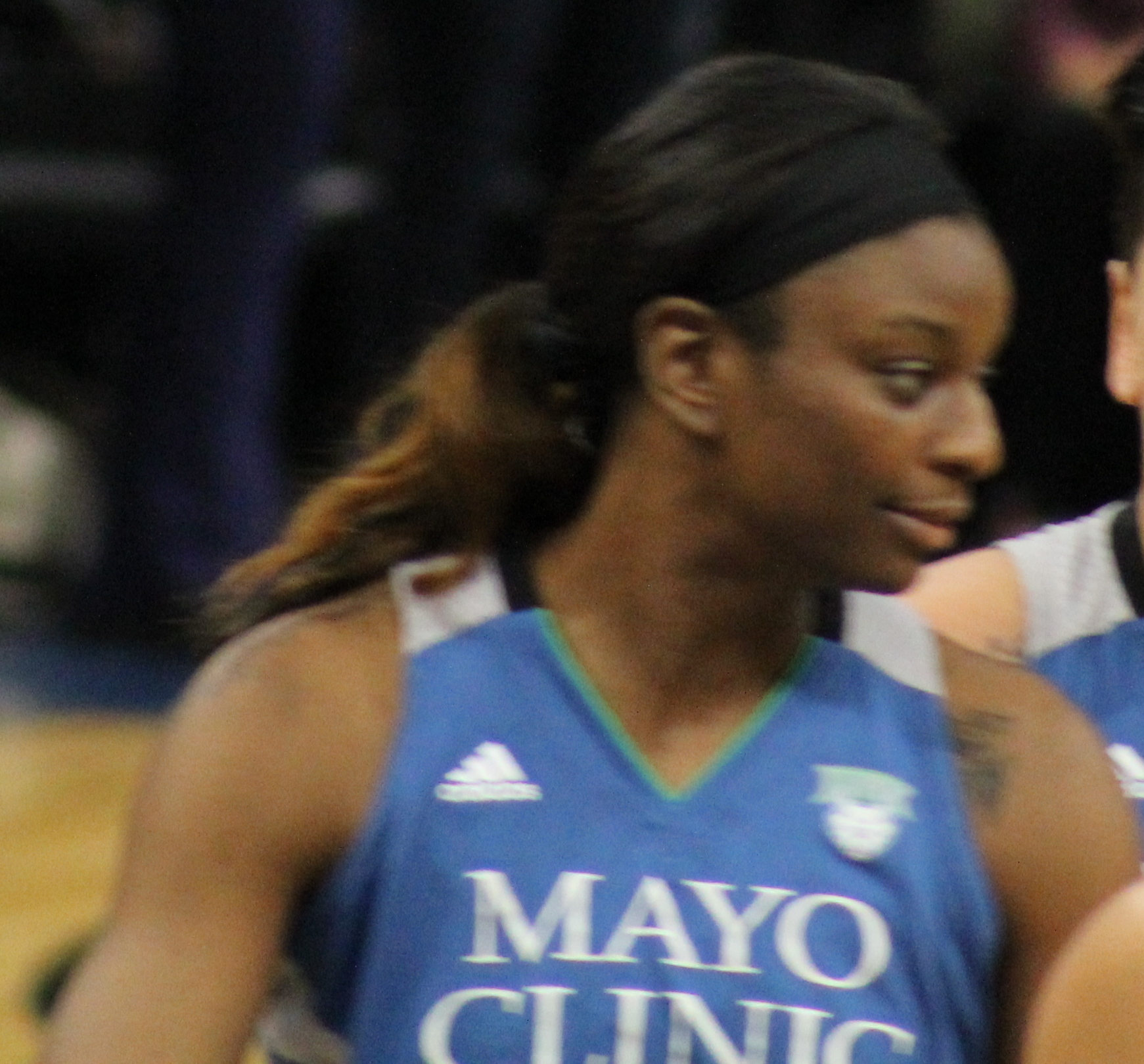

Free agent
- Position: Forward

Personal information
- Born: February 22, 1990 (age 36) Philadelphia, Pennsylvania, U.S.
- Listed height: 6 ft 2 in (1.88 m)
- Listed weight: 171 lb (78 kg)

Career information
- High school: Carver (Philadelphia, Pennsylvania)
- College: DePaul (2008–2012)
- WNBA draft: 2012: 2nd round, 22nd overall pick
- Drafted by: Seattle Storm
- Playing career: 2012–present

Career history
- 2016: Minnesota Lynx
- 2017: Chicago Sky

Career highlights
- First-team All-Big East (2011); Big East All-Freshman Team (2009)
- Stats at Basketball Reference
Medals
Women's basketball
Representing United States
World University Games
Gold medal – first place	2011 Shenzhen	Team

Keisha Hampton (born February 22, 1990) is an American professional basketball player who last played for the Chicago Sky of the Women's National Basketball Association (WNBA). She signed a training camp contract for the Connecticut Sun on April 1, 2014, but was waived prior to the start of the season. On March 30, 2016, she was signed by the Minnesota Lynx for the 2016 WNBA season. Prior to the 2017 WNBA season she was traded to the Chicago Sky. On June 16, 2026, she joined the Yale Bulldogs women’s basketball staff as an assistant coach.

== Career statistics ==
Legend
GP	Games played	GS	Games started	MPG	Minutes per game	RPG	Rebounds per game
APG	Assists per game	SPG	Steals per game	BPG	Blocks per game	PPG	Points per game
TO	Turnovers per game	FG%	Field-goal percentage	3P%	3-point field-goal percentage	FT%	Free-throw percentage
**Bold**	Career best	°	League leader

=== WNBA ===
==== Regular season ====
Year	Team	GP	GS	MPG	FG%	3P%	FT%	RPG	APG	SPG	BPG	TO	PPG
2016	Minnesota	**27**	0	6.8	.333	.333	.870	0.4	**0.4**	**0.3**	0.1	0.4	2.6
2017	Chicago	19	**1**	**7.8**	**.414**	**.417**	**1.000**	**0.6**	0.3	**0.3**	**0.2**	**0.3**	**3.6**
Career	2 years, 2 teams	46	1	7.2	.374	.375	.897	0.5	0.3	0.3	0.1	0.3	3.0

==== Playoffs ====
Year	Team	GP	GS	MPG	FG%	3P%	FT%	RPG	APG	SPG	BPG	TO	PPG
2016	Minnesota	4	0	2.0	.500	.333	.000	0.0	0.0	0.0	0.0	0.5	1.3
Career	1 year, 1 team	4	0	2.0	.500	.333	.000	0.0	0.0	0.0	0.0	0.5	1.3

=== College statistics ===
Legend
GP	Games played	GS	Games started	MPG	Minutes per game
FG%	Field goal percentage	3P%	3-point field goal percentage	FT%	Free throw percentage
RPG	Rebounds per game	APG	Assists per game	SPG	Steals per game
BPG	Blocks per game	PPG	Points per game	**Bold**	Career high

Year	Team	GP	Points	FG%	3P%	FT%	RPG	APG	SPG	BPG	PPG
2008–09	DePaul	33	344	41.3	32.1	73.8	4.6	1.8	1.0	0.9	10.4
2009–10	DePaul	33	456	41.4	33.7	73.1	**5.5**	1.6	1.5	1.1	13.8
2010–11	DePaul	**36**	**575**	**41.6**	**35.6**	74.6	4.9	**2.5**	**1.7**	0.8	16.0
2011–12	DePaul	12	199	41.4	34.7	**88.1**	4.6	2.2	1.3	**1.5**	**16.6**
Career		114	1574	41.5	34.3	75.7	5.0	2.0	1.4	1.0	13.8
