= Abi Olajuwon =

Nigerian-American basketball player and coach (born 1988)

Personal information
- Born: July 6, 1988 (age 38) Houston, Texas
- Listed height: 6 ft 4 in (1.93 m)
- Listed weight: 236 lb (107 kg)

Career information
- High school: Marlborough School (Los Angeles, California)
- College: Oklahoma (2006–2010)
- WNBA draft: 2010: 3rd round, 28th overall pick
- Drafted by: Chicago Sky
- Playing career: 2010–2013
- Position: Center
- Number: 21, 34
- Coaching career: 2014–present

Career history

Playing
- 2010: Chicago Sky
- 2010: SEAT-Lami-Véd Győr
- 2011: CSM Satu Mare
- 2011: Tulsa Shock
- 2011–2012: Hapoel Rishon LeZion
- 2012: ŽKK Novi Zagreb
- 2012: BC Castors Braine
- 2012: Esportivo Ourinhos
- 2012: Heilongjiang Chenneng
- 2013: Caja Rural Zamarat

Coaching
- 2014–2016: Cal State Fullerton (assistant)
- 2016–2018: Eastern Michigan (assistant)
- 2018–2022: TCU (assistant)
- 2023–2025: Connecticut Sun (assistant)
- 2025–Present: Arizona State (assistant)

Career highlights
- McDonald's All-American (2006)
- Stats at WNBA.com
- Stats at Basketball Reference

Alon Abisola Arisicate Ajoke Olajuwon, better known as Abi Olajuwon (born July 6, 1988) is a Nigerian-American basketball coach and former player. She is an assistant coach for Connecticut Sun in the WNBA. Olajuwon is the daughter of former NBA center Hakeem Olajuwon. Her name, Abisola Olajuwon, means "born into wealth and loved by all".

== Playing career ==
=== High school and college ===
Born in Houston, Texas, Olajuwon played varsity basketball for her Californian high school, Marlborough School, and helped her team win three consecutive Southern Section titles. Olajuwon was a 2006 McDonald's All-American, and was one of the most prized recruits of the 2006 graduating high school class. She played college basketball at the University of Oklahoma, and ESPN basketball analyst Nancy Lieberman stated before the 2006–07 season that the addition of Olajuwon would help propel the Sooners into contention for the NCAA championship.

In 2010, she earned a Bachelor of Arts degree in broadcast journalism and electronic media at the University of Oklahoma.

=== Professional ===
Olajuwon was drafted 28th overall (third round) by the Chicago Sky in the 2010 WNBA draft. However, she was waived during the season. After being waived, Olajuwon signed with Hungarian SEAT-Lami-Véd Győr, and later played for CSM Satu Mare (Romania).

In 2011, Olajuwon returned to the WNBA and was signed by the Tulsa Shock and played there during the 2011 season. During the offseason, she played for Hapoel Rishon LeZion (Israel), ŽKK Novi Zagreb (Croatia), BC Castors Braine (Belgium). Olajuwon was waived by Tulsa Shock before the 2012 season. After being waived she played for Esportivo Ourinhos (Brazil), and Heilongjiang Chenneng (China). Olajuwon finished her career playing for Spanish club Caja Rural Zamarat.

== Coaching career ==
In May 2014, Olajuwon became an assistant coach for the women's basketball team at California State University, Fullerton. On May 20, 2016, Olajuwon was hired as an assistant coach for the women's Eastern Michigan Eagles. In May 2018, Olajuwon was added the Texas Christian University (TCU) Horned Frogs women's basketball coaching staff. On December 27, 2022, it was announced Olajuwon had been added to the WNBA's Connecticut Sun as an assistant coach.

== Career statistics ==
Legend
GP	Games played	GS	Games started	MPG	Minutes per game	RPG	Rebounds per game
APG	Assists per game	SPG	Steals per game	BPG	Blocks per game	PPG	Points per game
TO	Turnovers per game	FG%	Field-goal percentage	3P%	3-point field-goal percentage	FT%	Free-throw percentage
**Bold**	Career best	°	League leader

=== College ===
Year	Team	GP	Points	FG%	3P%	FT%	RPG	APG	SPG	BPG	PPG
2006–07	Oklahoma	17	37	48.4%	0.0%	58.3%	1.5	0.1	0.2	0.1	2.2
2007–08	Oklahoma	19	36	40.0%	0.0%	**88.9%**	3.2	0.1	0.4	0.1	1.9
2008–09	Oklahoma	27	37	31.7%	0.0%	55.0%	2.2	0.1	0.3	0.1	1.4
2009–10	Oklahoma	**38**	**401**	**50.6%**	0.0%	61.7%	**7.3**	**0.5**	**0.5**	**0.9**	**10.6**
Career		101	511	47.8%	0.0%	62.1%	4.2	0.2	0.4	0.4	5.1

=== WNBA ===
==== Regular season ====
Year	Team	GP	GS	MPG	FG%	3P%	FT%	RPG	APG	SPG	BPG	TO	PPG
2010	Chicago	6	0	5.0	**.500**	–	–	.7	.0	**.2**	.0	**.3**	**1.0**
2011	Tulsa	**16**	0	**6.2**	.269	–	**1.000**	**.8**	**.1**	.0	**.1**	**.3**	**1.0**
Career	2 years, 2 teams	22	0	5.9	.313	–	**1.000**	.7	.1	.0	.1	.3	1.0
