= 2012 WNBA draft =

2012 meeting of WNBA teams to select players

General information
- Sport: Basketball
- Date(s): April 16, 2012
- Location: Bristol, Connecticut
- Network(s): ESPN2, NBATV, ESPNU

Overview
- League: WNBA
- First selection: Nneka Ogwumike; Los Angeles Sparks

The 2012 WNBA draft was the league's annual process for determining which teams receive the rights to negotiate with players entering the league. The draft was held on April 16, 2012, at the ESPN studios in Bristol, Connecticut. The first round was shown on ESPN2 (HD), with the second and third rounds shown on NBA TV and ESPNU.

== Draft lottery ==
The lottery selection to determine the order of the top four picks in the 2012 draft occurred on November 10, 2011. The Los Angeles Sparks won the first pick, while the Chicago Sky, Minnesota Lynx and Tulsa Shock were awarded the second, third and fourth picks respectively. The remaining first-round picks and all the second- and third-round picks were assigned to teams in reverse order of their win–loss records in the previous season.

Below were the chances for each team to get specific picks in the 2012 draft lottery, rounded to three decimal places:

Team	2011 record	Lottery chances	Pick			
Team	2011 record	Lottery chances	1st	2nd	3rd	4th
Tulsa Shock	3–31	442	.442	.316	.181	.062
Minnesota Lynx (from Was.)	6–28	276	.276	.310	.270	.144
Seattle Storm (from Chi.)	14–20	178	.178	.230	.317	.275
Los Angeles Sparks	15–19	104	.104	.145	.232	.520
Shaded block denotes actual lottery result.

== Transactions ==
- February 1, 2011: Los Angeles acquired a second-round pick from Tulsa as part of the Andrea Riley transaction.
- April 11, 2011: Minnesota acquired a second-round pick from Atlanta as part of the Felicia Chester/Rachel Jarry transaction.
- April 11, 2011: Atlanta acquired a second-round pick from Washington as part of the Lindsey Harding trade.
- April 11, 2011: Washington acquired a first-round pick from Atlanta as part of the Lindsey Harding trade.
- April 11, 2011: Phoenix acquired a third-round pick from Connecticut as part of the Tahnee Robinson transaction.
- April 11, 2011: Minnesota acquired a second-round pick from New York as part of the Jessica Breland transaction.
- April 11, 2011: Minnesota acquired a first-round pick from Washington as part of the Nicky Anosike trade.
- April 29, 2011: Indiana acquired a third-round pick from Seattle as part of the Katie Smith/Erin Phillips three-team trade.
- April 29, 2011: Washington acquired a first-round pick from Seattle and a third-round pick from Indiana as part of the Katie Smith/Erin Phillips three-team trade.
- April 29, 2011: Seattle acquired a second-round pick from Indiana as part of the Katie Smith/Erin Phillips three-team trade.
- May 2, 2011: Tulsa acquired second- and third-round picks from San Antonio as part of the Scholanda Robinson transaction.
- May 27, 2011: Minnesota has the right to swap third-round picks with New York as part of the Quanitra Hollingsworth transaction.
- June 1, 2011: Los Angeles acquired a second-round pick from Chicago as part of the Lindsay Wisdom-Hylton trade.
- January 2, 2012: Seattle acquired the second overall pick from Chicago and Chicago acquired the 23rd overall pick from Seattle as part of the Swin Cash trade.
- February 28, 2012: Phoenix traded the 18th pick to Minnesota in exchange for Charde Houston and the 24th pick.

== Draft invitees ==
The WNBA announced on April 11, 2012, that 15 players had been invited to attend the draft. Unless indicated otherwise, all players listed are Americans who played at U.S. colleges.

- LaSondra Barrett, LSU
- Vicki Baugh, Tennessee
- Sasha Goodlett, Georgia Tech
- Tiffany Hayes, Connecticut
- Glory Johnson, Tennessee
- Shenise Johnson, Miami (FL)
- Lynetta Kizer, Maryland
- Natalie Novosel, Notre Dame
- Nneka Ogwumike, Stanford
- Devereaux Peters, Notre Dame
- Samantha Prahalis, Ohio State
- Kayla Standish, Gonzaga
- Shekinna Stricklen, Tennessee
- Riquna Williams, Miami (FL)
- Julie Wojta, Green Bay

== Key ==
!	Denotes player who has been inducted to the Naismith Memorial Basketball Hall of Fame
^	Denotes player who has been inducted to the Women's Basketball Hall of Fame
*	Denotes player who has been selected for at least one All-Star Game and All-WNBA Team
^{+}	Denotes player who has been selected for at least one All-Star Game
^{#}	Denotes player who never played in the WNBA regular season or playoffs
**Bold**	Denotes player who won Rookie of the Year

== Draft ==
=== Round 1 ===
Pick	Player	Nationality	Team	School / club team
1	**Nneka Ogwumike** *	United States	Los Angeles Sparks	Stanford
2	Shekinna Stricklen	United States	Seattle Storm (from Chicago)	Tennessee
3	Devereaux Peters	United States	Minnesota Lynx (from Washington)	Notre Dame
4	Glory Johnson ^{+}	United States	Tulsa Shock	Tennessee
5	Shenise Johnson	United States	San Antonio Silver Stars	Miami (FL)
6	Samantha Prahalis	United States	Phoenix Mercury	Ohio State
7	Kelley Cain	United States	New York Liberty	Tennessee
8	Natalie Novosel	United States	Washington Mystics (from Atlanta)	Notre Dame
9	Astan Dabo ^{#}	Mali	Connecticut Sun	Reims Basket (France)
10	LaSondra Barrett ^{#}	United States	Washington Mystics (from Seattle)	LSU
11	Sasha Goodlett	United States	Indiana Fever	Georgia Tech
12	Damiris Dantas	Brazil	Minnesota Lynx	CD Bosco-Celta de Vigo (Spain)

=== Round 2 ===
Pick	Player	Nationality	Team	School / club team
13	Farhiya Abdi	Sweden	Los Angeles Sparks (from Tulsa)	Frisco SIKA (Czech Republic)
14	Tiffany Hayes *	United States	Atlanta Dream (from Washington)	Connecticut
15	Khadijah Rushdan ^{#}	United States	Los Angeles Sparks (from Chicago)	Rutgers
16	Tyra White ^{#}	United States	Los Angeles Sparks	Texas A&M
17	Riquna Williams ^{+}	United States	Tulsa Shock (from San Antonio)	Miami (FL)
18	Julie Wojta	United States	Minnesota Lynx (from Phoenix)	Green Bay
19	Kayla Standish ^{#}	United States	Minnesota Lynx (from New York)	Gonzaga
20	Nika Barič ^{#}	Slovenia	Minnesota Lynx (from Atlanta)	Spartak Moscow (Russia)
21	Chay Shegog	United States	Connecticut Sun	North Carolina
22	Keisha Hampton	United States	Seattle Storm	DePaul
23	Shey Peddy	United States	Chicago Sky (from Indiana via Seattle)	Temple
24	C'eira Ricketts ^{#}	United States	Phoenix Mercury (from Minnesota)	Arkansas

=== Round 3 ===
Pick	Player	Nationality	Team	School / club team
25	Vicki Baugh	United States	Tulsa Shock	Tennessee
26	Anjale Barrett ^{#}	United States	Washington Mystics	Maryland
27	Sydney Carter	United States	Chicago Sky	Texas A&M
28	April Sykes	United States	Los Angeles Sparks	Rutgers
29	Lynetta Kizer	United States	Tulsa Shock (from San Antonio)	Maryland
30	Christine Flores ^{#}	United States	Phoenix Mercury	Missouri
31	Jacki Gemelos	United States	Minnesota Lynx (from New York)	USC
32	Isabelle Yacoubou (pick later voided)	France	Atlanta Dream	Valencia (Spain)
33	Amanda Johnson ^{#}	United States	Phoenix Mercury (from Connecticut)	Oregon
34	Courtney Hurt ^{#}	United States	Indiana Fever (from Seattle)	VCU
35	Briana Gilbreath	United States	Washington Mystics (from Indiana)	USC
36	Katelan Redmon	United States	New York Liberty (from Minnesota)	Gonzaga

== See also ==
- List of first overall WNBA draft picks
