= Tyrone Culver =

American football player (born 1983)

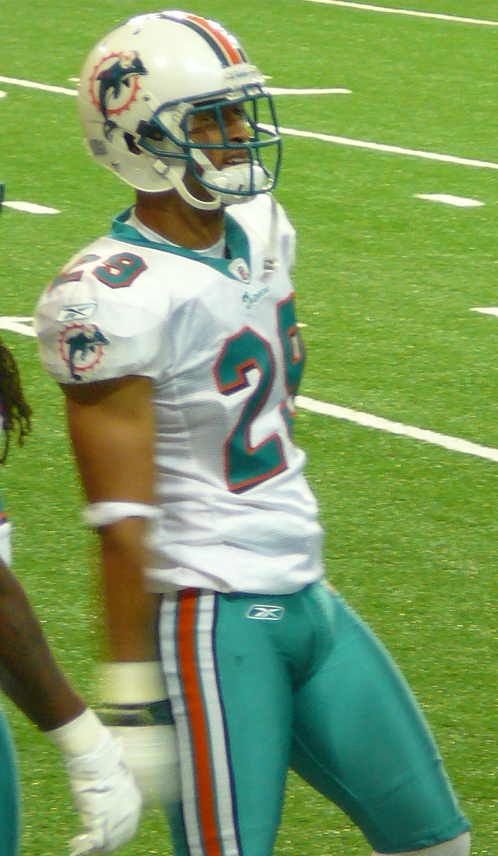
- Culver with the Miami Dolphins in 2011

No. 29, 36
- Position: Safety

Personal information
- Born: July 6, 1983 (age 43); Lancaster, California, U.S.
- Listed height: 6 ft 1 in (1.85 m)
- Listed weight: 210 lb (95 kg)

Career information
- High school: Palmdale (Palmdale, California)
- College: Fresno State
- NFL draft: 2006: 6th round, 185th overall pick

Career history
- Green Bay Packers (2006−2007); Miami Dolphins (2008−2012)

Awards and highlights
- First-team All-WAC (2005)

Career NFL statistics
- Total tackles: 137
- Sacks: 1
- Forced fumbles: 1
- Fumble recoveries: 2
- Interceptions: 2
- Stats at Pro Football Reference

Lanell Tyrone Culver (born July 6, 1983) is an American former professional football player who was a safety in the National Football League (NFL). He played college football for the Fresno State Bulldogs.

== Professional career ==
He was selected by the Green Bay Packers in the sixth round of the 2006 NFL draft.

Pre-draft measurables
Height	Weight	40-yard dash	20-yard shuttle	Three-cone drill	Vertical jump	Broad jump	Bench press
6 ft 0 3/4 in (1.85 m)	200 lb (91 kg)	4.62 s	4.35 s	7.25 s	39.5 in (1.00 m)	10 ft 9 in (3.28 m)	23 reps
All values from Pro Day

== Early life ==
Culver attended Palmdale High School in Palmdale, California and won All-League and All-CIF honors.
