= 2011 Los Angeles Sparks season =

- Head coach: Jennifer Gillom (4-6); Joe Bryant (11-13)
- Arena: Staples Center

Results
- Record: 15–19 (.441)
- Place: 5th (Western)
- Playoff finish: Did not qualify

Media
- Television: PRIME; ESPN2, NBATV

The 2011 Los Angeles Sparks season was the franchise's 15th season in the Women's National Basketball Association, and the second and final season under head coach Jennifer Gillom.

== Transactions ==
=== WNBA draft ===
The following are the Sparks' selections in the 2011 WNBA draft.

| Round | Pick | Player | Nationality | School/team/country |
|---|---|---|---|---|
| 1 | 5 | Jantel Lavender | United States | Ohio State |
| 3 | 29 | Elina Babkina (pick later voided) | Latvia | Latvia |

=== Transaction log ===
- February 1: The Sparks traded Andrea Riley to the Tulsa Shock in exchange for a second-round pick in the 2012 draft.
- February 2: The Sparks signed Ebony Hoffman, LaToya Pringle and Natasha Lacy and re-signed Ticha Penicheiro and Noelle Quinn.
- February 3: The Sparks signed Loree Moore.
- February 8: The Sparks signed Courtney Paris and re-signed Chanel Mokango.
- March 31: The Sparks signed Jenna O'Hea.
- May 21: The Sparks waived Chanel Mokango.
- May 25: The Sparks waived Loree Moore.
- June 1: The Sparks traded Lindsay Wisdom-Hylton to the Chicago Sky in exchange for a second-round pick in the 2012 draft.
- June 2: The Sparks waived Courtney Paris.
- July 11: The Sparks announced that Jennifer Gillom was relieved of her head coaching duties. Assistant coach Joe Bryant was named head coach.

=== Trades ===
| Date | Trade | |
|---|---|---|
| February 1, 2011 | To Los Angeles Sparks | To Tulsa Shock |
| February 1, 2011 | second-round pick in 2012 draft | Andrea Riley |
| June 1, 2011 | To Los Angeles Sparks | To Chicago Sky |
| June 1, 2011 | second-round pick in 2012 draft | Lindsay Wisdom-Hylton |

=== Personnel changes ===
==== Additions ====
| Player | Signed | Former team |
| Ebony Hoffman | February 2, 2011 | Indiana Fever |
| LaToya Pringle | February 2, 2011 | free agent |
| Natasha Lacy | February 2, 2011 | free agent |
| Jenna O'Hea | March 31, 2011 | free agent |
| Jantel Lavender | April 11, 2011 | draft pick |

==== Subtractions ====
| Player | Left | New team |
| Andrea Riley | February 1, 2011 | Tulsa Shock |
| Marie Ferdinand-Harris | February 24, 2011 | Phoenix Mercury |
| Betty Lennox | May 3, 2011 | free agent |
| Chanel Mokango | May 21, 2011 | free agent |
| Lindsay Wisdom-Hylton | June 1, 2011 | Chicago Sky |

== Roster ==
2011 Los Angeles Sparks roster
Players
Coaches

| Pos. | No. | Nat. | Name | Height | Weight | DOB | From | Yrs |
|---|---|---|---|---|---|---|---|---|
| F | 16 | (United States) | Hoffman, Ebony | 6' 2" (1.88m) | 215 lb (98kg) | 1982-08-27 | USC | 7 |
| G | 1 | (United States) | Lacy, Natasha | 5' 10" (1.78m) | 165 lb (75kg) | 1985-07-08 | UTEP | 1 |
| C | 42 | (United States) | Lavender, Jantel | 6' 4" (1.93m) | 185 lb (84kg) | 1988-11-12 | Ohio State | R |
| F | 8 | (United States) | Milton-Jones, DeLisha | 6' 1" (1.85m) | 185 lb (84kg) | 1974-09-11 | Florida | 12 |
| G/F | 6 | (Australia) | O'Hea, Jenna | 6' 1" (1.85m) | 174 lb (79kg) | 1987-06-06 | Australia | R |
| F | 3 | (United States) | Parker, Candace | 6' 4" (1.93m) | 175 lb (79kg) | 1986-04-19 | Tennessee | 3 |
| G | 21 | (Portugal) | Penicheiro, Ticha | 5' 11" (1.8m) | 146 lb (66kg) | 1974-09-18 | Old Dominion | 13 |
| F/C | 30 | (United States) | Pringle, LaToya | 6' 3" (1.91m) | 170 lb (77kg) | 1986-09-11 | North Carolina | 2 |
| G | 45 | (United States) | Quinn, Noelle | 6' 0" (1.83m) | 175 lb (79kg) | 1985-01-03 | UCLA | 4 |
| F | 32 | (United States) | Thompson, Tina | 6' 2" (1.88m) | 178 lb (81kg) | 1975-02-10 | USC | 14 |
| G | 20 | (United States) | Toliver, Kristi | 5' 7" (1.7m) | 130 lb (59kg) | 1987-01-27 | Maryland | 2 |

Head coach
(United States) Joe Bryant (La Salle)
Assistant coaches
(Australia) Sandy Brondello (Australia)
Athletic trainer
(United States) Courtney Watson (California)
Strength and conditioning coach
(United States) Bruce Deziel (Ohio)

Legend

- (C) Team captain
- (DP) Unsigned draft pick
- (FA) Free agent
- (S) Suspended
- Injured

=== Depth ===
| Pos. | Starter | Bench |
|---|---|---|
| C | Candace Parker | Jantel Lavender |
| PF | Tina Thompson | Ebony Hoffman; LaToya Pringle |
| SF | Delisha Milton-Jones | Jenna O'Hea |
| SG | Noelle Quinn | Kristi Toliver |
| PG | Ticha Penicheiro | Natasha Lacy |

== Season standings ==
| Western Conference | W | L | PCT | GB | Home | Road | Conf. |
|---|---|---|---|---|---|---|---|
| Minnesota Lynx ^{x} | 27 | 7 | .794 | – | 14–3 | 13–4 | 18–4 |
| Seattle Storm ^{x} | 21 | 13 | .618 | 6.0 | 15–2 | 6–11 | 15–7 |
| Phoenix Mercury ^{x} | 19 | 15 | .559 | 8.0 | 11–6 | 8–9 | 11–11 |
| San Antonio Silver Stars ^{x} | 18 | 16 | .529 | 9.0 | 9–8 | 9–8 | 11–11 |
| Los Angeles Sparks ^{o} | 15 | 19 | .441 | 12.0 | 10–7 | 5–12 | 10–12 |
| Tulsa Shock ^{o} | 3 | 31 | .088 | 24.0 | 2–15 | 1–16 | 1–21 |

== Schedule ==
=== Preseason ===
2011 Game Log: Preseason

| Game | Date | Time (ET) | Opponent | Score | High points | High rebounds | High assists | Location/Attendance | Record |
|---|---|---|---|---|---|---|---|---|---|
| 1 | May 25 | 3:00pm | Seattle | 71-66 | Parker (17) | O'Hea, Lacy (6) | Penicheiro (4) | Torodome; 3,212 | 1-0 |
| 2 | May 28 | 10:00pm | Phoenix | 83-72 | Milton-Jones (14) | Milton-Jones (6) | Lavender, Penicheiro (4) | The Pit; N/A | 2-0 |

=== Regular season ===
2011 Game Log: Regular Season
June

| Game | Date | Time (ET) | Opponent | TV | Score | High points | High rebounds | High assists | Location/Attendance | Record |
|---|---|---|---|---|---|---|---|---|---|---|
| 1 | June 3 | 11:00pm | Minnesota | NBATV; PRIME | 82-74 | Parker (19) | Parker (10) | Quinn (4) | Staples Center; 13,589 | 1-0 |
| 2 | June 5 | 3:30pm | @ Minnesota | PRIME; FS-N | 69-86 | Toliver (13) | Parker (7) | Penicheiro (5) | Target Center; 10,123 | 1-1 |
| 3 | June 10 | 10:30pm | Phoenix | | 98-84 | Parker (22) | Thompson (9) | Parker; Penicheiro (5) | Staples Center; 10,616 | 2-1 |
| 4 | June 19 | 8:30pm | Seattle | PRIME | 74-50 | Hoffman (12) | Parker (7) | Toliver (5) | Staples Center; 9,119 | 3-1 |
| 5 | June 21 | 10:00pm | New York | ESPN2 | 96-91 | Milton-Jones (27) | Parker (13) | Toliver (7) | Staples Center; 10,389 | 4-1 |
| 6 | June 24 | 8:00pm | @ San Antonio | | 80-90 (OT) | Parker (25) | Parker (13) | Penicheiro (7) | AT&T Center; 8,617 | 4-2 |
| 7 | June 26 | 4:00pm | @ New York | | 67-77 | Parker (16) | Parker (11) | Penicheiro (4) | Prudential Center; 7,625 | 4-3 |
| 8 | June 28 | 8:00pm | @ Connecticut | ESPN2 | 76-79 | Toliver (19) | Thompson (9) | Milton-Jones; Penicheiro; Quinn (5) | Mohegan Sun Arena; 6,515 | 4-4 |

July

| Game | Date | Time (ET) | Opponent | TV | Score | High points | High rebounds | High assists | Location/Attendance | Record |
|---|---|---|---|---|---|---|---|---|---|---|
| 9 | July 5 | 9:00pm | @ Phoenix | ESPN2 | 82-101 | Hoffman (21) | Pringle (9) | Penicheiro (5) | US Airways Center; 9,826 | 4-5 |
| 10 | July 9 | 10:00pm | @ Seattle | NBATV; KONG | 80-99 | Lavender (21) | Lavender (9) | Toliver (5) | KeyArena; 9,686 | 4-6 |
| 11 | July 12 | 8:00pm | @ San Antonio | NBATV; PRIME; FS-SW | 84-74 | Penicheiro (18) | Lavender; Penicheiro (8) | Toliver (8) | AT&T Center; 6,769 | 5-6 |
| 12 | July 15 | 8:00pm | @ Tulsa | | 79-74 | Toliver (25) | Milton-Jones (9) | Toliver (6) | BOK Center; 5,034 | 6-6 |
| 13 | July 17 | 8:30pm | Washington | NBATV | 85-89 (OT) | Toliver (21) | Hoffman (7) | Toliver (7) | Staples Center; 10,398 | 6-7 |
| 14 | July 18 | 10:30pm | San Antonio | | 69-79 | Lacy; Lavender (14) | O'Hea (11) | Lacy (7) | Staples Center; 8,818 | 6-8 |
All-Star break
| 15 | July 26 | 8:00pm | @ Minnesota | | 72-85 | Toliver (28) | Hoffman (9) | Lacy; Penicheiro; Quinn (2) | Target Center; 8,044 | 6-9 |
| 16 | July 28 | 7:00pm | @ Atlanta | NBATV; SSO | 80-89 | Hoffman (16) | Hoffman (8) | Penicheiro (11) | Philips Arena; 6,701 | 6-10 |
| 17 | July 30 | 8:00pm | @ Chicago | CN100 | 88-84 | Milton-Jones (19) | Lavender (6) | Penicheiro; Toliver (5) | Allstate Arena; 5,909 | 7-10 |
| 18 | July 31 | 6:00pm | @ Indiana | NBATV | 63-98 | Hoffman (13) | Hoffman (6) | Lacy (4) | Conseco Fieldhouse; 9,256 | 7-11 |

August

| Game | Date | Time (ET) | Opponent | TV | Score | High points | High rebounds | High assists | Location/Attendance | Record |
|---|---|---|---|---|---|---|---|---|---|---|
| 19 | August 3 | 3:00pm | Connecticut | NBATV | 70-79 | Milton-Jones (14) | Thompson (8) | Penicheiro (5) | Staples Center; 14,266 | 7-12 |
| 20 | August 7 | 8:30pm | Minnesota | NBATV | 78-84 | Milton-Jones (18) | Lavender (6) | Penicheiro (7) | Staples Center; 13,528 | 7-13 |
| 21 | August 9 | 10:30pm | Tulsa | PRIME | 71-66 | Penicheiro (23) | Hoffman (8) | Penicheiro (7) | Staples Center; 8,255 | 8-13 |
| 22 | August 12 | 10:30pm | Phoenix | | 93-90 (OT) | Lavender (25) | Lavender (10) | Milton-Jones; Penicheiro (6) | Staples Center; 10,512 | 9-13 |
| 23 | August 16 | 10:30pm | Atlanta | NBATV; PRIME; SSO | 79-84 | Milton-Jones (19) | Parker (10) | Penicheiro (10) | Staples Center; 7,522 | 9-14 |
| 24 | August 18 | 10:30pm | Indiana | | 75-70 | Hoffman (21) | Hoffman (7) | Parker (5) | Staples Center; 8,102 | 10-14 |
| 25 | August 20 | 8:00pm | @ Minnesota | | 68-87 | Parker (18) | Parker (8) | O'Hea (4) | Target Center; 8,816 | 10-15 |
| 26 | August 21 | 7:00pm | @ Tulsa | | 73-67 | Parker (23) | Parker (9) | Penicheiro (5) | BOK Center; 6,012 | 11-15 |
| 27 | August 23 | 7:00pm | @ Washington | CSN-MA | 86-82 (OT) | Parker (19) | Thompson (10) | Penicheiro (6) | Verizon Center; 8,441 | 12-15 |
| 28 | August 26 | 10:30pm | Tulsa | NBATV | 75-77 | Milton-Jones (24) | Milton-Jones (8) | Penicheiro (10) | Staples Center; 8,997 | 12-16 |
| 29 | August 28 | 9:00pm | @ Seattle | ESPN2 | 63-65 | Parker (19) | Parker (14) | Penicheiro (4) | KeyArena; 9,686 | 12-17 |
| 30 | August 30 | 10:30pm | Seattle | PRIME | 68-62 | Parker (27) | Parker; Thompson (7) | Penicheiro (5) | Staples Center; 9,023 | 13-17 |

September

| Game | Date | Time (ET) | Opponent | TV | Score | High points | High rebounds | High assists | Location/Attendance | Record |
|---|---|---|---|---|---|---|---|---|---|---|
| 31 | September 3 | 10:00pm | @ Phoenix | NBATV | 77-93 | Parker (32) | Milton-Jones (8) | Penicheiro; Toliver (4) | US Airways Center; 9,620 | 13-18 |
| 32 | September 6 | 10:30pm | San Antonio | NBATV; PRIME; FS-SW | 65-82 | Thompson (18) | Milton-Jones (8) | Penicheiro (7) | Staples Center; 8,502 | 13-19 |
| 33 | September 9 | 10:30pm | Tulsa | NBATV | 84-73 | Lavender (19) | Lavender (12) | Penicheiro (7) | Staples Center; 10,299 | 14-19 |
| 34 | September 10 | 10:30pm | Chicago | NBATV; CN100 | 74-67 | Milton-Jones (15) | Lavender; Pringle (6) | Lacy (7) | Staples Center; 13,501 | 15-19 |

All games are viewable on WNBA LiveAccess or ESPN3.com

== Statistics ==
Legend
| GP | Games played | GS | Games started | MPG | Minutes per game | RPG | Rebounds per game |
| APG | Assists per game | SPG | Steals per game | BPG | Blocks per game | PPG | Points per game |
| FG% | Field-goal percentage | 3P% | 3-point field-goal percentage | FT% | Free-throw percentage | TO | Turnovers per game |
| PF | Fouls per game | | Team leader | | League leader |

=== Regular season ===
| Player | GP | GS | MPG | FG% | 3P% | FT% | RPG | APG | SPG | BPG | PPG |
|---|---|---|---|---|---|---|---|---|---|---|---|
| Ebony Hoffman | 34 | 16 | 22.1 | .437 | .429 | .844 | 4.2 | 1.1 | 1.06 | 0.26 | 7.5 |
| Natasha Lacy | 29 | 0 | 13.6 | .429 | .333 | .540 | 2.2 | 1.7 | 0.97 | 0.31 | 5.0 |
| Jantel Lavender | 33 | 3 | 14.8 | .500 | .000 | .733 | 3.1 | 0.5 | 0.18 | 0.36 | 6.6 |
| Delisha Milton-Jones | 34 | 34 | 26.2 | .462 | .352 | .831 | 4.6 | 2.0 | 0.94 | 0.35 | 11.7 |
| Jenna O'Hea | 31 | 5 | 16.4 | .434 | .444 | .786 | 1.5 | 1.3 | 0.39 | 0.16 | 4.8 |
| Candace Parker | 17 | 16 | 32.6 | .511 | .419 | .736 | 8.6 | 2.8 | 1.24 | 1.59 | 18.5 |
| Ticha Penicheiro | 34 | 23 | 23.7 | .486 | .417 | .868 | 2.8 | 4.8 | 0.82 | 0.09 | 6.0 |
| LaToya Pringle | 20 | 0 | 11.1 | .473 | 1.000 | .889 | 2.4 | 0.3 | 0.25 | 0.65 | 3.9 |
| Noelle Quinn | 33 | 23 | 20.6 | .390 | .397 | .818 | 1.8 | 2.0 | 0.64 | 0.06 | 5.1 |
| Tina Thompson | 34 | 33 | 25.0 | .386 | .339 | .833 | 4.6 | 1.1 | 1.15 | 0.68 | 9.9 |
| Kristi Toliver | 32 | 17 | 23.6 | .462 | .352 | .831 | 4.6 | 2.0 | 0.94 | 0.35 | 11.7 |

== Awards and honors ==
- Candace Parker was named WNBA Western Conference Player of the Week for the week of August 15, 2011.
- Candace Parker was named to the 2011 WNBA All-Star Team as a starter.
