= 2008 New York Liberty season =

- Head coach: Pat Coyle
- Arena: Madison Square Garden

Results
- Record: 19–15 (.559)
- Place: 3rd (Eastern)
- Playoff finish: Lost Eastern Conference Final

The 2008 New York Liberty season was the 12th season for the New York Liberty franchise of the WNBA, and their fourth full season under head coach, Pat Coyle. The first ever outdoor professional basketball game was held at Arthur Ashe Stadium between the New York Liberty and the Indiana Fever. Over 19,000 fans attended the game.

== Offseason ==
The following player was selected in the Expansion Draft:

- Ann Wauters New York Liberty

=== Transactions ===
- April 25 The Liberty waived Jennifer Benningfield.
- April 16 The Liberty signed Kia Wright and Megan Darrah to training camp contracts.
- April 2 The Liberty signed Tiffani Johnson, Jenni Benningfield and LaToya Davis to training camp contracts.
- March 18 The Liberty signed Loree Moore to a three-year contract extension.
- March 12 The Liberty signed Janel McCarville to a three-year contract extension.
- March 11 The Liberty signed free agent Megan Duffy to a training camp contract.
- March 4 The Liberty re-signed free agent Shameka Christon, re-signed Ashley Battle and signed Lindsay Bowen to a training camp contract.

=== WNBA draft ===
Pick	Player	Nationality	School/Club team
7	Essence Carson	United States	Rutgers
14	Erlana Larkins (from Detroit Shock)	United States	North Carolina
27	Wanisha Smith (from Phoenix Mercury)	United States	Duke
35	Alberta Auguste	United States	Tennessee

== Preseason ==
Date	Opponent	Score	Result	Record
TBD	TBD	TBD	TBD	TBD

== Regular season ==
=== Season standings ===
Eastern Conference	W	L	PCT	GB	Home	Road	Conf.
Detroit Shock ^{x}	22	12	.647	–	14–3	8–9	16–4
Connecticut Sun ^{x}	21	13	.618	1.0	13–4	8–9	13–7
New York Liberty ^{x}	19	15	.559	3.0	11–6	8–9	11–9
Indiana Fever ^{x}	17	17	.500	5.0	11–6	6–11	12–8
Chicago Sky ^{o}	12	22	.353	10.0	8–9	4–13	10–10
Washington Mystics ^{o}	10	24	.294	12.0	6–11	4–13	6–14
Atlanta Dream ^{o}	4	30	.118	18.0	1–16	3–14	2–18

=== Season schedule ===
Date	Opponent	Score	Result	Record
May 18	vs. Connecticut	63-77	Loss	0-1
May 22	vs. Washington	79-60	Win	1-1
May 25	@Detroit	62-72	Loss	1-2
May 30	@ Connecticut	84-89	Loss	1-3
June 3	vs. Seattle	77-63	Win	2-3
June 6	vs. Houston	81-73	Win	3-3
June 8	vs. Sacramento	63-70	Loss	3-4
June 11	@ Atlanta	81-77	Win	4-4
June 14	vs. Minnesota	77-76	Win	5-4
June 18	@ Indiana	69-83	Loss	5-5
June 22	vs. Phoenix	105-72	Win	6-5
June 24	@ Minnesota	69-91	Loss	6-6
June 26	vs. Indiana	102-96 (3OT)	Win	7-6
June 28	@ Sacramento	78-82	Loss	7-7
July 1	@ Los Angeles	89-78	Win	8-7
July 3	@ Seattle	71-84	Loss	8-8
July 5	@ Phoenix	93-83	Win	9-8
July 8	@ San Antonio	79-83	Loss	9-9
July 12	vs. Detroit	74-64	Win	10-9
July 15	@ Connecticut	77-71	Win	11-9
July 17	vs. Washington	77-56	Win	12-9
July 19	vs. Indiana	55-71	Loss	12-10
July 23	@ Washington	80-73	Win	13-10
July 25	vs. Los Angeles	69-68	Win	14-10
July 27	@ Atlanta	86-76	Win	15-10
August 28	vs. Chicago	60-69	Loss	15-11
August 29	@ Detroit	69-83	Loss	15-12
September 2	@ Houston	90-87(OT)	Win	16-12
September 5	vs. Atlanta	82-71	Win	17-12
September 7	vs. Chicago	69-61	Win	18-12
September 9	vs. San Antonio	76-82	Loss	18-13
September 11	@ Indiana	59-74	Loss	18-14
September 12	@ Chicago	69-62	Win	19-14
September 14	vs. Detroit	59-61	Loss	19-15

== Player stats ==
Note: GP= Games played; REB= Rebounds; AST= Assists; STL = Steals; BLK = Blocks; PTS = Points; AVG = Average

Player	GP	REB	AST	STL	BLK	PTS	AVG

== Roster ==
2008 New York Liberty roster
Players
Coaches

Pos.	No.	Nat.	Name	Height	Weight	From
SF	22	(United States)	Battle, Ashley	6' 0" (1.83m)	170 lb (77kg)	Connecticut
G/F	17	(United States)	Carson, Essence	6' 0" (1.83m)	165 lb (75kg)	Rutgers
G/F	20	(United States)	Christon, Shameka	6' 1" (1.85m)	170 lb (77kg)	Arkansas
C	50	(United States)	Davenport, Jessica	6' 5" (1.96m)	215 lb (98kg)	Ohio State
PG	13	(United States)	Duffy, Megan	5' 7" (1.7m)	135 lb (61kg)	Notre Dame
PF	3	(United States)	Jackson, Tiffany (injured)	6' 3" (1.91m)	185 lb (84kg)	Texas
PF	33	(United States)	Kraayeveld, Cathrine	6' 4" (1.93m)	180 lb (82kg)	Oregon
PF	24	(United States)	Larkins, Erlana	6' 1" (1.85m)	210 lb (95kg)	North Carolina
C	4	(United States)	McCarville, Janel	6' 2" (1.88m)	205 lb (93kg)	Minnesota
PG	23	(United States)	Mitchell, Leilani	5' 5" (1.65m)	130 lb (59kg)	Utah
PG	21	(United States)	Moore, Loree	5' 9" (1.75m)	165 lb (75kg)	Tennessee
SG	5	(United States)	Thorn, Erin	5' 10" (1.78m)	150 lb (68kg)	BYU
SG	40	(United States)	Willis, Lisa	5' 11" (1.8m)	170 lb (77kg)	UCLA

Head coach
(United States) Pat Coyle (Rutgers)
Assistant coaches
(United States) Nick DiPillo (Fairleigh Dickinson)
(United States) Bruce Hamburger (Kean)
Athletic trainer
(United States) Lisa White (Stony Brook)
Strength and conditioning coach
(United States) Lisa White (Stony Brook)

Legend

- (C) Team captain
- (DP) Unsigned draft pick
- (FA) Free agent
- (S) Suspended
- Injured

WNBA roster page

== Playoffs ==
Round	Date	Opponent	Score	Result	Record
Eastern Conference Semi	September 18	vs. Connecticut	72-63	Win	1-0
	September 20	@ Connecticut	70-73	Loss	1-1
	September 22	@ Connecticut	66-62	Win	2-1
Eastern Conference Final	September 26	vs. Detroit	60-56	Win	1-0 (3-1)
	September 28	@ Detroit	55-64	Loss	1-1 (3-2)
	September 29	@ Detroit	73-75	Loss	1-2 (3-3)
