= 2012 Los Angeles Sparks season =

- Coach: Carol Ross
- Arena: Staples Center
- Attendance: per game

Results
- Record: 24–10 (.706)
- Place: 2nd (Western)
- Playoff finish: Lost in Conference Finals

Media
- Television: KDOC, TWC101; ESPN2, NBATV

The 2012 Los Angeles Sparks season was the franchise's 16th season in the Women's National Basketball Association, and the first season under head coach Carol Ross. The season tipped off on May 18, 2012, at KeyArena versus the Seattle Storm and ended on September 15 against the Minnesota Lynx.

== Transactions ==
=== WNBA draft ===
The following are the Sparks' selections in the 2012 WNBA draft.

Round	Pick	Player	Nationality	School/team/country
1	1	Nneka Ogwumike	United States	Stanford
2	13 (from Tul.)	Farhiya Abdi	Sweden	Frisco Sika (Czech Republic)
2	15 (from Chi.)	Khadijah Rushdan	United States	Rutgers
2	16	Tyra White	United States	Texas A&M
3	28	April Sykes	United States	Rutgers

=== Transaction log ===
- February 1, 2011: The Sparks acquired a second-round pick from the Tulsa Shock as part of the Andrea Riley trade.
- April 11, 2011: The Sparks acquired a second-round pick from the Chicago Sky as part of the Lindsay Widsom-Hylton trade.
- February 1: The Sparks traded Noelle Quinn to the Washington Mystics in exchange for Marissa Coleman.
- February 8: The Sparks signed Alana Beard.
- February 23: The Sparks traded Natasha Lacy and LaToya Pringle to the Washington Mystics in exchange for Nicky Anosike.
- February 23: The Sparks signed Sharnee Zoll.
- March 9: The Sparks signed Ashley Shields.
- April 9: The Sparks signed Darxia Morris.
- April 23: The Sparks signed draft picks Khadijah Rushdan and April Sykes.
- April 24: The Sparks signed Rashidat Junaid.
- April 25: The Sparks re-signed Candace Parker to a multi-year contract.
- April 26: The Sparks signed draft picks Nneka Ogwumike and Tyra White.
- May 8: The Sparks waived Tyra White and Rashidat Junaid.
- May 15: The Sparks waived Khadijah Rushdan, Ashley Shields, and Darxia Morris.
- June 8: The Sparks signed Coco Miller and waived Sharnee Zoll.
- July 2: The Sparks waived Coco Miller.
- July 5: The Sparks signed Andrea Riley.

=== Trades ===
Date	Trade	
February 1, 2012	To Los Angeles Sparks	To Washington Mystics
February 1, 2012	Marissa Coleman	Noelle Quinn
February 23, 2012	To Los Angeles Sparks	To Washington Mystics
February 23, 2012	Nicky Anosike	Natasha Lacy and LaToya Pringle

=== Personnel changes ===
==== Additions ====
Player	Signed	Former team
Marissa Coleman	February 1, 2012	Washington Mystics
Alana Beard	February 8, 2012	Washington Mystics
Nicky Anosike	February 23, 2012	Washington Mystics
Nneka Ogwumike	April 16, 2012	draft pick
April Sykes	April 16, 2012	draft pick

==== Subtractions ====
Player	Left	New team
Noelle Quinn	February 1, 2012	Washington Mystics
Ticha Penicheiro	February 22, 2012	Chicago Sky
Natasha Lacy	February 23, 2012	Washington Mystics
LaToya Pringle	February 23, 2012	Washington Mystics
Tina Thompson	February 24, 2012	Seattle Storm

== Roster ==
Pos.	Starter	Bench
C	Candace Parker	Jantel Lavender
PF	Nneka Ogwumike	Ebony Hoffman; Nicky Anosike
SF	Delisha Milton-Jones	Marissa Coleman
SG	Alana Beard	April Sykes; Jenna O'Hea
PG	Kristi Toliver

== Season standings ==
Western Conference	W	L	PCT	GB	Home	Road	Conf.
Minnesota Lynx ^{z}	27	7	.794	–	16–1	11–6	17–5
Los Angeles Sparks ^{x}	24	10	.706	3.0	16–1	8–9	15–7
San Antonio Silver Stars ^{x}	21	13	.618	6.0	12–5	9–8	14–8
Seattle Storm ^{x}	16	18	.471	11.0	10–7	6–11	11–11
Tulsa Shock ^{o}	9	25	.265	18.0	6–11	3–14	5–17
Phoenix Mercury ^{o}	7	27	.206	20.0	3–14	4–13	4–18

== Schedule ==
=== Preseason ===
2012 Game Log: Preseason (May)

Game	Date	Time (ET)	Opponent	TV	Score	High points	High rebounds	High assists	Location/Attendance	Record
1	Sat 5	7:00	China		98-71	Ogwumike (20)	Ogwumike (11)	4 players (5)	Pasadena City College; 1,073	1–0
2	Thu 10	10:30	Japan		95-77	Ogwumike (17)	Lavender; Ogwumike (6)	Zoll (6)	LA Southwest College; 950	2–0
3	Sun 13	5:00	@ Seattle		60-61	Coleman (11)	Ogwumike (7)	Zoll (8)	KeyArena; 4,628	2–1

=== Regular season ===
2012 Game Log: Regular Season
May (4–1)

Game	Date	Time (ET)	Opponent	TV	Score	High points	High rebounds	High assists	Location/Attendance	Record
1	Fri 18	10:00	@ Seattle	NBATV; KDOC	72-66	Toliver (25)	Milton-Jones (7)	Toliver (6)	KeyArena; 9,686	1–0
2	Tue 22	10:30	Seattle	KDOC; KONG	74-61	Parker (21)	Parker (10)	Parker; Toliver (4)	Staples Center; 9,238	2–0
3	Thu 24	8:00	@ Minnesota		84-92	Parker; Toliver (23)	Ogwumike (9)	Toliver (4)	Target Center; 7,923	2–1
4	Sat 26	10:00	@ Phoenix	KDOC	99-88	Parker (27)	Parker (11)	Beard; Toliver (4)	US Airways Center; 10,200	3–1
5	Tue 29	10:30	Tulsa	TWC101	76-75	Milton-Jones; Toliver (16)	Parker (10)	Toliver (5)	Staples Center; 8,312	4–1

June (6-5)

Game	Date	Time (ET)	Opponent	TV	Score	High points	High rebounds	High assists	Location/Attendance	Record
6	Sun 3	8:30	Seattle	KDOC; KONG	67-65	Toliver (23)	Parker (13)	Toliver (7)	Staples Center; 12,639	5–1
7	Fri 8	11:00	Phoenix	TWC101	90-74	Ogwumike (25)	Ogwumike (12)	Toliver (9)	Staples Center; 11,198	6–1
8	Wed 13	8:00	@ Connecticut	ESPN2	87-81	Parker (33)	Parker (16)	Parker (8)	Mohegan Sun Arena; 6,058	7–1
9	Fri 15	7:30	@ Atlanta	SSO	59-92	Ogwumike (13)	Ogwumike (10)	Coleman (4)	Philips Arena; 8,872	7–2
10	Sat 16	8:00	@ San Antonio	KDOC; FS-SW	85-98 (OT)	Beard (23)	Parker; Lavender (11)	Toliver (5)	AT&T Center; 8,234	7–3
11	Mon 18	10:30	Washington	TWC101	101-70	Ogwumike (24)	Parker (8)	Toliver (6)	Staples Center; 8,612	8–3
12	Wed 20	10:30	Tulsa	TWC101	95-79	Parker (33)	Parker (8)	Toliver (6)	Staples Center; 8,388	9–3
13	Sat 23	8:00	@ Phoenix	ESPN	93-84	Toliver (29)	Lavender (9)	Toliver (4)	US Airways Center; 9,670	10–3
14	Sun 24	8:30	San Antonio	KDOC	71-91	Parker (15)	Parker (15)	Beard (4)	Staples Center; 11,301	10–4
15	Tue 26	8:00	@ Tulsa		75-91	Toliver (21)	Ogwumike; Lavender (7)	Toliver (7)	BOK Center; 4,102	10–5
16	Thu 28	12:30	@ San Antonio	FS-SW	80-94	Parker (25)	Parker (13)	Beard (10)	AT&T Center; 15,184	10–6

July (5–0)

Game	Date	Time (ET)	Opponent	TV	Score	High points	High rebounds	High assists	Location/Attendance	Record
17	Thu 5	3:00	Minnesota	NBATV; TWC101	96-90	Toliver (29)	Parker (13)	Toliver (6)	Staples Center; 11,256	11–6
18	Sat 7	10:00	Seattle	ESPN2	83-59	Toliver (23)	Parker (14)	Parker (7)	Staples Center; 12,229	12–6
19	Sun 8	8:30	Atlanta	NBATV; KDOC	79-63	Toliver (19)	Parker (12)	Beard (7)	Staples Center; 11,019	13–6
20	Tue 10	3:30	@ Phoenix		90-71	Parker (22)	Ogwumike; Parker (14)	Beard (7)	US Airways Center; 9,336	14–6
21	Thu 12	7:00	@ Indiana	ESPN2	77-74	Ogwumike (22)	Ogwumike (20)	Toliver (4)	Bankers Life Fieldhouse; 7,244	15–6
Summer Olympic break

August (4–1)

Game	Date	Time (ET)	Opponent	TV	Score	High points	High rebounds	High assists	Location/Attendance	Record
Summer Olympic break
22	Sat 18	10:00	@ Seattle	NBATV; KDOC	82-71	Toliver (22)	Parker (12)	Toliver (5)	KeyArena; 9,127	16–6
23	Tue 21	10:30	Indiana	TWC101	79-69	Toliver (21)	Ogwumike (10)	Beard; Milton-Jones (5)	Staples Center; 8,402	17–6
24	Thu 23	10:30	San Antonio	TWC101	101-77	Toliver (29)	Parker (10)	Parker; Toliver (6)	Staples Center; 8,696	18–6
25	Sat 25	10:30	New York	NBATV; TWC101	87-62	Toliver (29)	Ogwumike (7)	Ogwumike (5)	Staples Center; 12,433	19–6
26	Thu 30	8:00	@ Tulsa		85-99	Toliver (21)	Milton-Jones (7)	Toliver (8)	BOK Center; 5,275	19–7

September (5–3)

Game	Date	Time (ET)	Opponent	TV	Score	High points	High rebounds	High assists	Location/Attendance	Record
27	Sun 2	6:00	@ Chicago	KDOC; CN100	74-85	Toliver (19)	Parker (9)	Ogwumike (6)	Allstate Arena; 6,197	19–8
28	Tue 4	8:00	@ Minnesota	NBATV	77-88	Beard (17)	Lavender (8)	Toliver (6)	Target Center; 8,123	19–9
29	Fri 7	7:00	@ Washington	CSN-MA	96-68	Parker; Toliver (18)	Parker (9)	Parker (8)	Verizon Center; 7,468	20–9
30	Sun 9	4:00	@ New York	KDOC; MSG	71-73	Toliver (17)	Parker (15)	Toliver (4)	Prudential Center; 7,357	20–10
31	Thu 13	10:30	Chicago	NBATV; TWC101; CN100	86-77	Ogwumike (30)	Ogwumike (11)	Parker (5)	Staples Center; 8,489	21–10
32	Fri 14	11:00	Connecticut	NBATV; TWC101; CPTV-S	93-82	Parker (23)	Parker (10)	Toliver (6)	Staples Center; 10,503	22–10
33	Tue 18	10:30	Phoenix	NBATV; TWC101	101-76	Parker (26)	Parker (11)	Parker (7)	Staples Center; 8,579	23–10
34	Thu 20	10:30	Minnesota	NBATV; TWC101	92-76	Ogwumike; Parker (22)	Ogwumike; Parker (11)	Toliver (8)	Staples Center; 10,217	24–10

All games are viewable on WNBA LiveAccess or ESPN3.com

=== Postseason ===
2012 Game Log: Postseason
Western Conference Semifinals

Game	Date	Time (ET)	Opponent	TV	Score	High points	High rebounds	High assists	Location/Attendance	Series
1	September 27	10:00	San Antonio	ESPN2	93-86	Toliver (29)	Parker (9)	Beard (3)	Galen Center; 5,013	1–0
2	September 29	3:00	@ San Antonio	NBATV	101-94	Parker (32)	Parker (9)	Parker (6)	Freeman Coliseum; 5,293	2–0

Western Conference Finals

Game	Date	Time (ET)	Opponent	TV	Score	High points	High rebounds	High assists	Location/Attendance	Series
1	October 4	8:00	@ Minnesota	ESPN2	77-94	Parker (25)	Parker (11)	Parker (4)	Target Center; 8,513	0–1
2	October 7	3:30	Minnesota	ABC	79-80	Parker (33)	Parker (15)	Beard (7)	Staples Center; 10,791	0–2

== Statistics ==
Legend
GP	Games played	GS	Games started	MPG	Minutes per game	RPG	Rebounds per game
APG	Assists per game	SPG	Steals per game	BPG	Blocks per game	PPG	Points per game
FG%	Field-goal percentage	3P%	3-point field-goal percentage	FT%	Free-throw percentage	TO	Turnovers per game
PF	Fouls per game		Team leader		League leader

=== Regular season ===
Player	GP	GS	MPG	FG%	3P%	FT%	RPG	APG	SPG	BPG	PPG
