= April Sykes =

American basketball player (born 1990)

Personal information
- Born: July 30, 1990 (age 36) Starkville, Mississippi
- Listed height: 6 ft 0 in (1.83 m)

Career information
- High school: East Oktibbeha County (Crawford, Mississippi)
- College: Rutgers (2008–2012)
- WNBA draft: 2012: 3rd round, 28th overall pick
- Drafted by: Los Angeles Sparks
- Playing career: 2012–present
- Position: Guard / forward

Career history
- 2012: Los Angeles Sparks

Career highlights
- McDonald's All-American (2008); Mississippi Miss Basketball (2008)
- Stats at WNBA.com
- Stats at Basketball Reference

April L. Sykes (born July 30, 1990) is an American professional basketball player most recently with the Los Angeles Sparks of the Women's National Basketball Association.

== USA Basketball ==
Sykes was selected to represent the U.S. at the 2011 Pan American Games held in Guadalajara, Mexico. The USA team lost their first two games in close contests, losing to Argentina 58–55 and Puerto Rico 75–70. The team rebounded to win their games against Mexico and Jamaica, but the 2–2 overall record left them in seventh place. Sykes averaged 9.0 points per game.

== Career statistics ==
=== WNBA ===
==== Regular season ====
WNBA regular season statistics
Year	Team	GP	GS	MPG	FG%	3P%	FT%	RPG	APG	SPG	BPG	TO	PPG
2012	Los Angeles	30	0	8.6	37.9	37.5	53.3	1.1	0.6	0.3	0.1	0.5	3.1
Career	1 year, 1 team	30	0	8.6	37.9	37.5	53.3	1.1	0.6	0.3	0.1	0.5	3.1

==== Playoffs ====
WNBA playoff statistics
Year	Team	GP	GS	MPG	FG%	3P%	FT%	RPG	APG	SPG	BPG	TO	PPG
2012	Los Angeles	1	0	7.0	.000	.000	—	2.0	0.0	0.0	0.0	0.0	0.0
Career	1 year, 1 team	1	0	7.0	.000	.000	—	2.0	0.0	0.0	0.0	0.0	0.0

=== College ===
NCAA statistics
Year	Team	GP	Points	FG%	3P%	FT%	RPG	APG	SPG	BPG	PPG
2008–09	Rutgers	30	95	27.3	27.1	60.0	2.1	0.8	0.5	0.1	3.2
2009–10	Rutgers	34	191	29.3	15.8	78.9	3.5	1.2	1.0	0.3	5.6
2010–11	Rutgers	33	464	43.0	37.6	72.5	4.2	1.6	1.3	0.5	14.1
2011–12	Rutgers	32	412	40.7	29.4	75.0	5.6	1.5	1.1	0.5	12.9
Career		129	1162	37.8	29.5	73.8	3.9	1.3	1.0	0.4	9.0
