= Lisa Willis =

American basketball player and coach (born 1984)

Westchester Knicks
- Title: Assistant coach
- League: NBA G League

Personal information
- Born: June 13, 1984 (age 42) Long Beach, California, U.S.
- Listed height: 6 ft 0 in (1.83 m)
- Listed weight: 170 lb (77 kg)

Career information
- High school: Narbonne (Harbor City, California)
- College: UCLA (2002–2006)
- WNBA draft: 2006: 1st round, 5th overall pick
- Drafted by: Los Angeles Sparks
- Playing career: 2006–2010
- Position: Guard
- Number: 40
- Coaching career: 2013–present

Career history

Playing
- 2006–2007: Los Angeles Sparks
- 2007–2008: New York Liberty
- 2009: Sacramento Monarchs
- 2009–2010: TTT Riga

Coaching
- 2013: Montreat College (assistant)
- 2014: Montreat College
- 2019–present: Westchester Knicks (assistant)

Career highlights
- As player: Latvian League champion (2010); Pac-12 Tournament MOP (2006); 2× All-Pac 10 (2005, 2006); As assistant coach: 2× NBA G League Winter Showcase champion (2023, 2024)
- Stats at Basketball Reference
Medals
Women's basketball
Representing the United States
World University Games
Gold medal – first place	2005 Izmir	Team

Lisa Camille Willis (born June 13, 1984) is an American basketball coach currently working as an assistant coach for the Westchester Knicks of the NBA G League. She played professionally in the WNBA with the Los Angeles Sparks, New York Liberty and the Sacramento Monarchs. She entered the WNBA in 2006 as the overall fifth draft pick to the Los Angeles Sparks immediately following her college career at University of California, Los Angeles. While Willis played for the Los Angeles Sparks for her first two seasons, she was playing for the New York Liberty her last two seasons where she led the WNBA in three-pointers in 2008.

Willis played college basketball at UCLA. In 2006 as a senior, Willis was named prior to the season by Nancy Lieberman of ESPN as the nation's best defender, named Honorable mention AP All American, selected Third Team All American selection by Women's Basketball News Service, named as a Pre Season Naismith Award Nominee, nominated for the Bayer Advantage Senior Class Award, was UCLA's All time 3point shot leader (second on All Time PAC10 list), ranked ninth on the All Time UCLA Scoring List, ranked fifth at UCLA in all time games played, ranked 13th on all time school rebounding list, ranked 10th in all time school scoring list, ranked 8th in all time school free throw percentage, ranked second in all time school steal list and listed as the first player in history to record three straight seasons with 100 or more steals.

In 2005 as a junior, Willis was deemed as UCLA's all time 3point shot leader, was selected first team All PAC10, was ranked sixth in nation in steals, became first Bruin to record back to back 100 steals seasons, tied her own school record for made 3point shots, recorded 26 double figure scoring games and tallied nine double figure rebounding games. She was also selected to the 2005 USA Team and won a gold medal in Izmir, Turkey.

In 2004 as a sophomore, Willis tallied a total of 100 steals (which was the most ever by a UCLA sophomore), was ranked third in NCAA in steals per game, was ranked ninth for sophomores scoring at UCLA, ranked first in PAC10 in steals, ranked first in PAC10 in 3point shots made, ranked seventh in PAC10 in defensive rebounding, 15th in overall rebounding, and ranked tenth in PAC10 in scoring.

In 2003 as a freshman, Willis finished the regular season seventh in PAC10 3pointers made and ranked second on UCLA's all-time single season frosh list for 3pointer.

== High school ==
Lisa Willis grew up in Long Beach, CA and attended Narbonne High School in Harbor City, CA. As a four-year Varsity basketball player, Willis saw a great deal of success at Narbonne. Noted accomplishments for Willis are as follows: Won two straight City Championship, named second team All State selection by Cal Hi Sports as an underclassman, named as the Los Angeles City Player of the Year, named First Team Marine League, named First Team All City, named Second Team All Area by Daily Breeze, won Back to back City, State, and US National Championships with New York Liberty's Loree Moore and one with Indian Fever's Ebony Hoffman, name a Nike All American, named Honorable mention All American US Today and Street & Smith's and was also recognized as the Sophomore State Player of the Year. She committed herself to UCLA as sophomore. Her Nickname is Raindropper as it was given to her in High School by Ebony Hoffman.

== Career statistics ==
Legend
GP	Games played	GS	Games started	MPG	Minutes per game	RPG	Rebounds per game
APG	Assists per game	SPG	Steals per game	BPG	Blocks per game	PPG	Points per game
TO	Turnovers per game	FG%	Field-goal percentage	3P%	3-point field-goal percentage	FT%	Free-throw percentage
**Bold**	Career best	°	League leader

=== WNBA ===
==== Regular season ====
Year	Team	GP	GS	MPG	FG%	3P%	FT%	RPG	APG	SPG	BPG	TO	PPG
2006	Los Angeles	24	0	13.3	38.5	36.5	71.0	**1.8**	0.4	**1.1**	0.0	0.7	4.6
2007	Los Angeles	8	0	9.6	35.0	22.2	50.0	1.1	0.5	0.5	**0.1**	1.3	2.3
2007	New York	16	0	9.8	34.4	31.8	62.5	1.7	**0.6**	0.6	0.0	1.5	3.8
2008	New York	**34**	**2**	**13.5**	**42.1**	**46.8**	**96.7**	1.7	0.4	0.9	**0.1**	0.9	**5.6**
2009	Sacramento	2	0	2.5	0.0	0.0	0.0	0.0	0.0	0.0	0.0	**0.5**	0.0
Career	4 years, 3 teams	84	2	12.1	38.9	39.5	79.5	1.6	0.4	0.8	0.1	1.0	4.5

==== Playoffs ====
Year	Team	GP	GS	MPG	FG%	3P%	FT%	RPG	APG	SPG	BPG	TO	PPG
2006	Los Angeles	5	0	**13.0**	27.3	25.0	**50.0**	**2.6**	**1.4**	0.2	0.0	0.6	**3.2**
2017	Los Angeles	2	0	6.5	**33.3**	**33.3**	0.0	0.0	0.0	0.0	0.0	**0.0**	2.5
2008	New York	**6**	0	4.7	25.0	0.0	0.0	0.5	0.2	**0.3**	**0.3**	1.0	0.3
Career	3 years, 2 teams	13	0	8.2	28.1	22.2	50.0	1.2	0.6	0.2	0.2	0.7	1.8

=== College ===
Legend
GP	Games played	GS	Games started	MPG	Minutes per game
FG%	Field goal percentage	3P%	3-point field goal percentage	FT%	Free throw percentage
RPG	Rebounds per game	APG	Assists per game	SPG	Steals per game
BPG	Blocks per game	PPG	Points per game	**Bold**	Career high

Year	Team	GP	Points	FG%	3P%	FT%	RPG	APG	SPG	BPG	PPG
2002-03	UCLA	29	224	36.7	34.3	74.1	3.6	0.8	1.9	0.2	7.7
2003-04	UCLA	30	428	43.0	**37.0**	71.0	5.4	2.1	3.3	0.4	14.3
2004-05	UCLA	28	455	40.3	36.1	**80.2**	**6.9**	2.3	3.6	0.5	16.3
2005-06	UCLA	**32**	**570**	**45.9**	36.3	75.6	5.8	**3.1**	3.6	**0.8**	**17.8**
Career	UCLA	119	1677	42.3	36.1	75.8	5.4	2.1	3.1	0.5	14.1

== USA Basketball ==
Willis was a member of the team representing the US at the 2005 World University Games Team in Izmir, Turkey. Willis averaged 9.7 points per game while helping the team to a 7–0 record, resulting in a gold medal at the event. Willis' efficiency showed in Turkey, when it was noted that she was a leading scorer and the top 3-point shooter but didn't tally as many minutes.

== FIBA career ==
Willis had a professional basketball career in Europe during the WNBA offseason. She played for teams in Vologda, Russia, Byron, Greece, Kayseri, Turkey and Riga, Latvia. Her last season of overseas basketball was played in Riga, Latvia where she won the Latvian Championship in 2010. Willis' career came to an end when she tore her ACL, MCL, and LCL the same day she received a contract to go back to Kayseri, Turkey where she once played.

== Coaching career ==
In November 2019, Willis was hired as an assistant coach to the Westchester Knicks.

== Personal life ==
Willis is currently living in Laurel, Maryland, where she has decided to put collegiate coach aside and revamp her player development business named Think. Work. Play!
