= Andrea Riley =

American basketball player (born 1988)

Personal information
- Born: July 22, 1988 (age 38) Dallas, Texas, U.S.
- Listed height: 5 ft 5 in (1.65 m)
- Listed weight: 136 lb (62 kg)

Career information
- High school: Lincoln (Dallas, Texas)
- College: Oklahoma State (2006–2010)
- WNBA draft: 2010: 1st round, 8th overall pick
- Drafted by: Los Angeles Sparks
- Position: Guard

Career history
- 2010: Los Angeles Sparks
- 2011: Tulsa Shock
- 2012: Phoenix Mercury
- 2012: Los Angeles Sparks

Career highlights
- Nancy Lieberman Award (2010); 2× Second-team All-American – AP (2008, 2010); First-team All-Big 12 (2008–2010); Big 12 Freshman of the Year (2007); Big 12 All-Freshman Team (2007)
- Stats at WNBA.com
- Stats at Basketball Reference

Andrea Riley (born July 22, 1988) is an American former professional basketball player who played in the Women's National Basketball Association (WNBA). She was drafted 8th overall in the 2010 WNBA draft by the Los Angeles Sparks.

Riley played collegiately for the Oklahoma State Cowgirls. As a senior in 2009–10, she was selected as the Nancy Lieberman Award winner, which is given annually the nation's best NCAA female point guard. She also ended that season as the nation's second leading scorer at 26.7 points per game.

== Career statistics ==
Legend
GP	Games played	GS	Games started	MPG	Minutes per game	RPG	Rebounds per game
APG	Assists per game	SPG	Steals per game	BPG	Blocks per game	PPG	Points per game
TO	Turnovers per game	FG%	Field-goal percentage	3P%	3-point field-goal percentage	FT%	Free-throw percentage
**Bold**	Career best	°	League leader

=== WNBA ===
==== Regular season ====
WNBA regular season statistics
Year	Team	GP	GS	MPG	FG%	3P%	FT%	RPG	APG	SPG	BPG	TO	PPG
2010	Los Angeles	29	0	7.7	30.3	**29.4**	83.8	0.8	1.0	0.5	0.0	0.8	3.4
2011	Tulsa	**33**	**10**	**19.0**	**31.4**	21.4	**85.5**	**1.2**	**1.8**	**1.0**	**0.1**	2.0	**6.0**
2012	Phoenix	9	0	9.3	17.9	6.3	82.4	0.9	1.4	0.3	**0.1**	1.3	2.8
2012	Los Angeles	2	0	7.5	0.0	0.0	0.0	0.5	1.0	0.0	0.0	**0.5**	0.0
**Career**	3 years, 3 teams	73	10	13.0	29.4	22.2	84.4	0.9	1.4	0.7	0.1	1.4	4.4

==== Playoffs ====
WNBA playoff statistics
Year	Team	GP	GS	MPG	FG%	3P%	FT%	RPG	APG	SPG	BPG	TO	PPG
2010	Los Angeles	1	0	2.0	0.0	0.0	0.0	1.0	0.0	0.0	0.0	0.0	0.0
**Career**	1 year, 1 team	1	0	2.0	0.0	0.0	0.0	1.0	0.0	0.0	0.0	0.0	0.0

=== College ===
NCAA statistics
Year	Team	GP	Points	FG%	3P%	FT%	RPG	APG	SPG	BPG	PPG
2006–07	Oklahoma State	30	384	37.8	28.6	72.5	3.1	5.0	2.0	**0.3**	12.8
2007–08	Oklahoma State	**35**	807	**41.8**	**30.4**	72.6	3.7	4.1	**3.0**	0.1	23.1
2008–09	Oklahoma State	32	735	35.9	27.3	74.5	**4.2**	6.0	2.0	0.0	23.0
2009–10	Oklahoma State	34	**909**	35.5	29.8	**80.2**	3.4	**6.5**	1.7	0.1	**26.7**
**Career**		131	2835	37.6	29.1	75.3	3.6	5.4	2.2	0.1	21.6

== See also ==
- List of NCAA Division I women's basketball season scoring leaders
