= Pat Coyle (basketball) =

American women's basketball coach

Patty Coyle
Biographical details
- Born: September 5, 1960 (age 66)

Playing career
- 1978–1982: Rutgers

Coaching career (HC unless noted)
- 1983–1985: Miami (Florida) (asst.)
- 1985–1989: Rutgers (asst.)
- 1989–1992: Saint Joseph's (asst.)
- 1992–1999: Loyola (Maryland)
- 1999–2004: New York Liberty (asst.)
- 2004–2009: New York Liberty
- 2010–2013: Pittsburgh (asst.)
- 2013–2018: Saint Peter's

Pat Coyle (born September 5, 1960) is an American women's basketball coach. She was the head coach of Saint Peter's, between 2013 and 2018. She has served as an assistant coach for the University of Pittsburgh Panthers women's basketball team. Coyle coached in the WNBA with the New York Liberty. Serving as the Liberty's assistant coach beginning in 1998, then attained the head coaching seat during the 2004 season (after the departure of Richie Adubato). The Coyle-led Liberty reached the playoffs in 2004, 2005, 2007, and 2008, but never won the Eastern Conference Championship.

In 2009, the Liberty started their season 6-11 despite a roster made up primarily of healthy, returning players. The team announced on July 31, 2009 that Coyle had been relieved of her duties, and that assistant coach Anne Donovan would take over as interim head coach.

Prior to joining the Liberty as an assistant coach in 1998, Coyle was the head women's basketball coach at Loyola University Maryland . There, Coyle amassed a 100-77 (.565) record in over six seasons, making her the winningest coach in Loyola history. She led the Greyhounds to the Metro Atlantic Athletic Conference Championships and the NCAA Division I women's basketball tournament in 1994 and 1995. Coyle also held assistant coaching posts during the 1980s at the University of Miami, Rutgers University, and St. Joseph's College.

Coyle was a star basketball player at Rutgers University, from which she graduated in 1982. She was named to the Rutgers Athletics Hall of Fame in 1993.

Coyle hails originally from Philadelphia, Pennsylvania.

== Head coaching record ==
Team	Year	G	W	L	W–L%	Finish	PG	PW	PL	PW–L%	Result
New York	2004	18	11	7	.611	2nd in Eastern	5	2	3	.400	Lost Conference finals
New York	2005	34	18	16	.529	3rd	2	0	2	.000	Lost Conference semifinals
New York	2006	34	11	23	.324	5th in Eastern	—	—	—	—	Missed playoffs
New York	2007	34	16	18	.471	4th in Eastern	3	1	2	.333	Lost Conference semifinals
New York	2008	34	19	15	.559	3rd in Eastern	6	3	3	.500	Lost Conference finals
New York	2009	17	6	11	.353	(left mid-season)	—	—	—	—	—
Career		171	81	90	.474		16	6	10	.375	
