= 2010 Los Angeles Sparks season =

- Head coach: Jennifer Gillom
- Arena: Staples Center

Results
- Record: 13–21 (.382)
- Place: 4th (Western)
- Playoff finish: Lost Conference Semifinals

Media
- Television: FS-W, PRIME; NBATV, ESPN2

The 2010 Los Angeles Sparks season was the franchise's 14th season in the Women's National Basketball Association, and the first season under head coach Jennifer Gillom.

== Transactions ==
=== Dispersal draft ===
Based on the Sparks' 2009 record, they would pick 8th in the Sacramento Monarchs dispersal draft. The Sparks waived their pick.

=== WNBA draft ===
The following are the Sparks' selections in the 2010 WNBA draft.

| Round | Pick | Player | Nationality | School/team/country |
|---|---|---|---|---|
| 1 | 8 | Andrea Riley | United States | Oklahoma State |
| 1 | 12 (from Phx.) | Bianca Thomas | United States | Mississippi |
| 2 | 20 | Angel Robinson | United States | Georgia |
| 3 | 32 | Rashidat Junaid | United States | Rutgers |

=== Transaction log ===
- March 26, 2009: The Sparks signed-and-traded Temeka Johnson to the Phoenix Mercury for Phoenix's first-round pick in the 2010 draft.
- May 5, 2009: The Sparks traded Rafaella Masciadri and a previously acquired first-round pick in the 2010 draft to the Minnesota Lynx in exchange for Noelle Quinn.
- February 9: The Sparks signed free agent Ticha Penicheiro.
- February 16: The Sparks signed LaToya Pringle.
- April 29: The Sparks waived Angel Robinson.
- May 7: The Sparks waived Vanessa Hayden.
- May 11: The Sparks signed Lisa Willis and waived Karina Figueroa.
- May 13: The Sparks traded a second-round pick in the 2011 Draft to the Chicago Sky in exchange for Kristi Toliver.
- May 13: The Sparks waived LaToya Pringle, Lisa Willis and Rashidat Junaid.
- May 14: The Sparks waived Shannon Bobbitt and Bianca Thomas.
- June 1: The Sparks waived Tiffany Stansbury and signed Chanel Mokango.

=== Trades ===
| Date | Trade | |
|---|---|---|
| March 26, 2009 | To Los Angeles Sparks | To Phoenix Mercury |
| March 26, 2009 | first-round pick in 2010 draft | Temeka Johnson |
| May 5, 2009 | To Los Angeles Sparks | To Minnesota Lynx |
| May 5, 2009 | Noelle Quinn | Rafaella Masciadri and a first-round pick in 2010 draft |
| May 13, 2010 | To Los Angeles Sparks | To Chicago Sky |
| May 13, 2010 | Kristi Toliver | second-round pick in 2011 draft |

=== Free agents ===
==== Additions ====
| Player | Signed | Former team |
| Ticha Penicheiro | February 9, 2010 | Sacramento Monarchs |
| Kristi Toliver | May 13, 2010 | Chicago Sky |
| Tiffany Stansbury | May 15, 2010 | free agent |
| Chanel Mokango | June 1, 2010 | free agent |

==== Subtractions ====
| Player | Left | New team |
| Lisa Leslie | 2009 | retired |
| Vanessa Hayden | May 7, 2009 | free agent |
| Shannon Bobbitt | May 14, 2009 | free agent |
| Tiffany Stansbury | June 1, 2010 | free agent |

== Roster ==
2010 Los Angeles Sparks roster
Players
Coaches

| Pos. | No. | Nat. | Name | Height | Weight | From |
|---|---|---|---|---|---|---|
| SG | 24 | (United States) | Ferdinand-Harris, Marie | 5' 9" (1.75m) | 153 lb (69kg) | LSU |
| SG | 22 | (United States) | Lennox, Betty (injured) | 5' 8" (1.73m) | 143 lb (65kg) | Louisiana Tech |
| SF | 8 | (United States) | Milton-Jones, DeLisha | 6' 1" (1.85m) | 185 lb (84kg) | Florida |
| F | 15 | (Democratic Republic of the Congo) | Mokango, Chanel | 6' 5" (1.96m) | | Mississippi State |
| F | 3 | (United States) | Parker, Candace (injured) | 6' 4" (1.93m) | 175 lb (79kg) | Tennessee |
| PG | 21 | (Portugal) | Penicheiro, Ticha | 5' 11" (1.8m) | 146 lb (66kg) | Old Dominion |
| PG | 45 | (United States) | Quinn, Noelle | 6' 0" (1.83m) | 175 lb (79kg) | UCLA |
| G | 10 | (United States) | Riley, Andrea | 5' 5" (1.65m) | 136 lb (62kg) | Oklahoma State |
| G | 7 | (United States) | Toliver, Kristi | 5' 7" (1.7m) | 130 lb (59kg) | Maryland |
| F | 32 | (United States) | Thompson, Tina | 6' 2" (1.88m) | 178 lb (81kg) | USC |
| F | 14 | (United States) | Wisdom-Hylton, Lindsay | 6' 2" (1.88m) | 186 lb (84kg) | Purdue |

Head coach
(United States) Jennifer Gillom (Mississippi)
Assistant coaches
(United States) Steve Smith
(United States) Jim Saia
Athletic trainer
(United States) Courtney Watson (California)
Strength and conditioning coach
(United States) Bruce Deziel

Legend

- (C) Team captain
- (DP) Unsigned draft pick
- (FA) Free agent
- (S) Suspended
- Injured

WNBA roster page

=== Depth ===
| Pos. | Starter | Bench |
|---|---|---|
| C | Tina Thompson | Chanel Mokango / Candace Parker |
| PF | Delisha Milton-Jones | Lindsay Wisdom-Hylton |
| SF | Noelle Quinn | Betty Lennox |
| SG | Marie Ferdinand-Harris | Kristi Toliver |
| PG | Ticha Penicheiro | Andrea Riley |

== Season standings ==
| Western Conference | W | L | PCT | GB | Home | Road | Conf. |
|---|---|---|---|---|---|---|---|
| Seattle Storm ^{x} | 28 | 6 | .824 | – | 17–0 | 11–6 | 20–2 |
| Phoenix Mercury ^{x} | 15 | 19 | .441 | 13.0 | 9–8 | 6–11 | 13–9 |
| San Antonio Silver Stars ^{x} | 14 | 20 | .412 | 14.0 | 8–9 | 6–11 | 11–11 |
| Los Angeles Sparks ^{x} | 13 | 21 | .382 | 15.0 | 8–9 | 5–12 | 10–12 |
| Minnesota Lynx ^{o} | 13 | 21 | .382 | 15.0 | 7–10 | 6–11 | 8–14 |
| Tulsa Shock ^{o} | 6 | 28 | .176 | 22.0 | 4–13 | 2–15 | 4–18 |

== Schedule ==
=== Preseason ===
2010 Game Log: Preseason

| Game | Date | Time (ET) | Opponent | Score | High points | High rebounds | High assists | Location/Attendance | Record |
|---|---|---|---|---|---|---|---|---|---|
| 1 | May 1 | 10:00pm | China National Team | 78-58 | Junaid (15) | Mohammed (12) | Penicheiro (7) | Viejas Arena; 3,874 | 1-0 |
| 2 | May 8 | 3:30pm | San Antonio | 77-86 | Ferdinand-Harris (13) | 3 players (5) | Bobbitt, Quinn (4) | Walter Pyramid; 1,521 | 1-1 |

=== Regular season ===
2010 Game Log: Regular Season
May

| Game | Date | Time (ET) | Opponent | TV | Score | High points | High rebounds | High assists | Location/Attendance | Record |
|---|---|---|---|---|---|---|---|---|---|---|
| 1 | May 15 | 2:00pm | @ Phoenix | ESPN2 | 77-78 | Parker (24) | Parker (12) | Riley (4) | US Airways Center; 14,772 | 0-1 |
| 2 | May 16 | 9:00pm | @ Seattle | KONG | 67-81 | Thompson (19) | Parker (11) | Penicheiro (6) | KeyArena; 9,686 | 0-2 |
| 3 | May 22 | 8:00pm | @ San Antonio | NBATV; FS-SW | 81-88 | Milton-Jones (20) | Parker, Thompson (10) | Milton-Jones (6) | AT&T Center; 7,862 | 0-3 |
| 4 | May 28 | 10:30pm | Washington | PRIME | 81-75 | Parker (30) | Parker (10) | Parker (5) | STAPLES Center; 13,154 | 1-3 |
| 5 | May 30 | 8:00pm | Atlanta | | 82-101 | Parker (32) | Parker (12) | Penicheiro (6) | STAPLES Center; 8,404 | 1-4 |

June

| Game | Date | Time (ET) | Opponent | TV | Score | High points | High rebounds | High assists | Location/Attendance | Record |
|---|---|---|---|---|---|---|---|---|---|---|
| 6 | June 4 | 10:00pm | @ Phoenix | | 89-90 | Parker (26) | Parker (12) | Penicheiro (10) | US Airways Center; 6,485 | 1-5 |
| 7 | June 5 | 11:00pm | Seattle | NBATV; FS-W | 75-79 | Parker (24) | Parker (8) | Lennox, Parker (4) | Home Depot Center; 6,026 | 1-6 |
| 8 | June 8 | 10:30pm | Phoenix | PRIME | 92-91 | Parker (22) | Parker (12) | Quinn (7) | STAPLES Center; 7,993 | 2-6 |
| 9 | June 11 | 10:00pm | @ Seattle | KONG | 60-82 | Parker (13) | Parker (7) | 4 players (2) | KeyArena; 7,286 | 2-7 |
| 10 | June 13 | 3:00pm | Minnesota | | 88-84 | Milton-Jones (22) | Parker (7) | Penicheiro (5) | STAPLES Center; 7,005 | 3-7 |
| 11 | June 18 | 10:30pm | Connecticut | | 75-78 | Thompson (24) | Milton-Jones, Quinn (6) | Penicheiro (8) | STAPLES Center; 8,852 | 3-8 |
| 12 | June 24 | 7:00pm | @ Washington | CSN-MA | 53-68 | Toliver (11) | Quinn (7) | Penicheiro (6) | Verizon Center; 8,160 | 3-9 |
| 13 | June 27 | 3:00pm | @ Atlanta | NBATV; SSO | 81-89 | Milton-Jones, Toliver (19) | Milton-Jones (11) | Penicheiro (10) | Philips Arena; 7,855 | 3-10 |
| 14 | June 29 | 10:30pm | New York | NBATV; PRIME | 68-80 | Quinn (24) | Thompson (6) | Ferdinand-Harris, Quinn (4) | STAPLES Center; 8,602 | 3-11 |

July

| Game | Date | Time (ET) | Opponent | TV | Score | High points | High rebounds | High assists | Location/Attendance | Record |
|---|---|---|---|---|---|---|---|---|---|---|
| 15 | July 1 | 10:30pm | San Antonio | | 73-63 | Thompson (24) | Thompson (10) | Penicheiro (4) | STAPLES Center; 7,803 | 4-11 |
| 16 | July 3 | 5:00pm | Seattle | ESPN2 | 62-75 | Toliver (18) | Thompson, Wisdom-Hylton (10) | Penicheiro (5) | STAPLES Center; 9,319 | 4-12 |
| 17 | July 6 | 10:00pm | Phoenix | ESPN2 | 89-98 | Milton-Jones (20) | Milton-Jones (8) | Milton-Jones (6) | STAPLES Center; 8,336 | 4-13 |
| 18 | July 13 | 7:00pm | @ Tulsa | ESPN2 | 87-71 | Thompson (24) | Penicheiro (7) | Penicheiro (9) | BOK Center; 7,073 | 5-13 |
| 19 | July 16 | 8:30pm | @ Chicago | CN100 | 68-80 | Milton-Jones (21) | Quinn (6) | Penicheiro (9) | Allstate Arena; 4,841 | 5-14 |
| 20 | July 18 | 3:00pm | @ San Antonio | | 73-83 | Thompson (23) | Thompson (8) | Penicheiro, Quinn (6) | AT&T Center; 6,542 | 5-15 |
| 21 | July 20 | 3:00pm | Tulsa | | 86-83 (OT) | Milton-Jones (23) | Penicheiro (7) | Penicheiro (13) | STAPLES Center; 14,413 | 6-15 |
| 22 | July 22 | 7:00pm | @ Indiana | ESPN2 | 57-76 | Thompson (19) | Milton-Jones, Thompson (8) | Penicheiro (6) | Conseco Fieldhouse; 7,898 | 6-16 |
| 23 | July 24 | 7:00pm | @ Connecticut | | 89-80 | Milton-Jones (20) | Penicheiro, Quinn (7) | Milton-Jones, Penicheiro (7) | Mohegan Sun Arena; 8,097 | 7-16 |
| 24 | July 27 | 8:00pm | @ Minnesota | | 71-58 | Thompson (24) | Milton-Jones, Quinn, Thompson (8) | Penicheiro (9) | Target Center; 6,215 | 8-16 |
| 25 | July 30 | 7:30pm | @ New York | | 79-88 | Thompson (18) | Wisdom-Hylton (6) | Penicheiro (7) | Madison Square Garden; 14,307 | 8-17 |

August

| Game | Date | Time (ET) | Opponent | TV | Score | High points | High rebounds | High assists | Location/Attendance | Record |
|---|---|---|---|---|---|---|---|---|---|---|
| 26 | August 4 | 10:30pm | Chicago | NBATV; CN100 | 82-77 | Milton-Jones (22) | Wisdom-Hylton (13) | Penicheiro (15) | STAPLES Center; 9,732 | 9-17 |
| 27 | August 6 | 10:30pm | Tulsa | | 77-70 | Milton-Jones (23) | Milton-Jones, Penicheiro, Quinn (7) | Penicheiro (13) | STAPLES Center; 8,962 | 10-17 |
| 28 | August 8 | 8:00pm | San Antonio | NBATV; FS-W; FSSW | 83-92 | Thompson (23) | Penicheiro (9) | Penicheiro (8) | STAPLES Center; 9,793 | 10-18 |
| 29 | August 10 | 10:00pm | Indiana | ESPN2 | 76-82 | Thompson (21) | Thompson (13) | Riley (6) | STAPLES Center; 10,586 | 10-19 |
| 30 | August 12 | 8:00pm | @ Minnesota | | 78-77 | Milton-Jones (21) | Thompson (8) | Penicheiro (10) | Target Center; 7,867 | 11-19 |
| 31 | August 14 | 8:00pm | @ Tulsa | COX | 92-87 | Thompson (24) | Thompson (11) | Penicheiro (9) | BOK Center; 5,719 | 12-19 |
| 32 | August 17 | 10:30pm | Phoenix | NBATV; PRIME | 84-90 | Thompson (33) | Penicheiro (9) | Penicheiro (11) | STAPLES Center; 8,817 | 12-20 |
| 33 | August 20 | 10:30pm | Minnesota | | 98-91 | Thompson (26) | Thompson (9) | Penicheiro (12) | STAPLES Center; 13,154 | 13-20 |
| 34 | August 21 | 11:00pm | @ Seattle | ESPN2 | 75-76 | Thompson (20) | Milton-Jones (9) | Penicheiro (8) | KeyArena; 9,686 | 13-21 |

All games are viewable on WNBA LiveAccess

=== Postseason ===
2010 Game Log: Postseason
Western Conference Semifinals

| Game | Date | Time (ET) | Opponent | TV | Score | High points | High rebounds | High assists | Location/Attendance | Series |
|---|---|---|---|---|---|---|---|---|---|---|
| 1 | August 25 | 11:00pm | @ Seattle | ESPN2 | 66-79 | Ferdinand-Harris (18) | Milton-Jones (8) | Toliver (5) | KeyArena; 10,589 | 0-1 |
| 2 | August 28 | 3:00pm | Seattle | ESPN2 | 66-81 | Thompson (18) | Milton-Jones (9) | Thompson (5) | STAPLES Center; 8,326 | 0-2 |

== Statistics ==
Legend
| GP | Games played | GS | Games started | MPG | Minutes per game | RPG | Rebounds per game |
| APG | Assists per game | SPG | Steals per game | BPG | Blocks per game | PPG | Points per game |
| FG% | Field-goal percentage | 3P% | 3-point field-goal percentage | FT% | Free-throw percentage | TO | Turnovers per game |
| PF | Fouls per game | | Team leader | | League leader |

=== Regular season ===
| Player | GP | GS | MPG | FG% | 3P% | FT% | RPG | APG | SPG | BPG | PPG |
|---|---|---|---|---|---|---|---|---|---|---|---|
| Marie Ferdinand-Harris | 30 | 24 | 24.3 | .409 | .292 | .839 | 2.7 | 1.2 | 0.87 | 0.17 | 8.9 |
| Betty Lennox | 11 | 0 | 11.6 | .391 | .361 | .833 | 1.7 | 1.5 | 0.18 | 0.00 | 4.9 |
| Delisha Milton-Jones | 34 | 34 | 32.2 | .470 | .317 | .866 | 4.7 | 2.5 | 1.09 | 0.65 | 15.4 |
| Chanel Mokango | 21 | 0 | 3.4 | .176 | .000 | .750 | 0.6 | 0.0 | 0.10 | 0.48 | 0.4 |
| Candace Parker | 10 | 10 | 33.5 | .500 | .250 | .732 | 10.1 | 2.2 | 1.00 | 2.20 | 20.6 |
| Ticha Penicheiro | 32 | 30 | 26.3 | .410 | .111 | .819 | 4.0 | 6.9 | 1.34 | 0.06 | 4.9 |
| Noelle Quinn | 34 | 34 | 32.5 | .443 | .402 | .776 | 4.0 | 2.8 | 1.03 | 0.32 | 10.2 |
| Andrea Riley | 29 | 0 | 7.7 | .303 | .294 | .838 | 0.8 | 1.0 | 0.48 | 0.03 | 3.4 |
| Tiffany Stansbury | 5 | 0 | 2.8 | .333 | .000 | .500 | 0.0 | 0.0 | 0.20 | 0.00 | 0.6 |
| Kristi Toliver | 34 | 4 | 20.7 | .438 | .349 | .815 | 2.2 | 1.3 | 0.53 | 0.06 | 8.6 |
| Tina Thompson | 33 | 33 | 33.2 | .446 | .352 | .872 | 6.2 | 1.8 | 1.15 | 0.73 | 16.6 |
| Lindsay Wisdom-Hylton | 32 | 1 | 15.1 | .500 | .000 | .706 | 3.4 | 0.4 | 0.56 | 0.75 | 4.5 |

=== Postseason ===
| Player | GP | GS | MPG | FG% | 3P% | FT% | RPG | APG | SPG | BPG | PPG |
|---|---|---|---|---|---|---|---|---|---|---|---|
| Marie Ferdinand-Harris | 2 | 2 | 32.5 | .391 | .429 | 1.000 | 2.0 | 0.5 | 1.50 | 0.00 | 12.5 |
| Delisha Milton-Jones | 2 | 2 | 35.5 | .360 | 1.000 | .500 | 8.5 | 1.0 | 0.50 | 0.50 | 10.5 |
| Ticha Penicheiro | 2 | 2 | 29.5 | .455 | .000 | 1.000 | 2.5 | 2.5 | 2.50 | 0.00 | 6.0 |
| Noelle Quinn | 2 | 2 | 34.0 | .368 | .500 | 1.000 | 4.0 | 0.5 | 1.00 | 0.00 | 9.5 |
| Andrea Riley | 1 | 0 | 2.0 | .000 | .000 | .000 | 1.0 | 0.0 | 0.00 | 0.00 | 0.0 |
| Kristi Toliver | 2 | 0 | 22.5 | .545 | .600 | 1.000 | 0.0 | 4.0 | 0.50 | 0.00 | 8.0 |
| Tina Thompson | 2 | 2 | 39.0 | .333 | .286 | 1.000 | 6.0 | 3.0 | 1.50 | 2.00 | 17.0 |
| Lindsay Wisdom-Hylton | 2 | 0 | 6.0 | .667 | .000 | .500 | 2.5 | 0.0 | 0.00 | 0.00 | 2.5 |

== Awards and honors ==
- Candace Parker was named WNBA Western Conference Player of the Week for the week of May 22, 2010.
- Tina Thompson was named WNBA Western Conference Player of the Week for the week of August 7, 2010.
- Tina Thompson was named WNBA Western Conference Player of the Week for the week of August 14, 2010.
- Tina Thompson was named WNBA Western Conference Player of the Month for August.
