= Tiffany Stansbury =

American basketball player (born 1983)

Personal information
- Born: January 16, 1983 (age 43) Philadelphia, Pennsylvania, U.S.
- Listed height: 6 ft 3 in (1.91 m)
- Listed weight: 183 lb (83 kg)

Career information
- High school: Riverdale Baptist (Upper Marlboro, Maryland)
- College: Gulf Coast CC (2002–2004); NC State (2004–2006)
- WNBA draft: 2006: 3rd round, 29th overall pick
- Drafted by: Houston Comets
- Playing career: 2006–2010
- Position: Center
- Number: 44, 42

Career history
- 2006: Los Angeles Sparks
- 2007: Minnesota Lynx
- 2010: Los Angeles Sparks
- Stats at Basketball Reference

Tiffany Stansbury (born January 16, 1983, in Philadelphia, Pennsylvania) is an American professional basketball player in the WNBA.

The daughter of former NBA player Terence Stansbury, Tiffany Stansbury attended college at NC State and graduated in 2006. Following her collegiate career, she was selected 29th overall in the 2006 WNBA draft by the Houston Comets.

Stansbury spent the 2006 WNBA season with the Los Angeles Sparks, appearing in 4 games. A late pre-season cut by the Sparks in 2007, Stansbury signed with Minnesota on May 25. In 30 games with the Lynx, Stansbury averaged 4.3 points and 4.3 rebounds per game.

== WNBA career statistics ==
Legend
GP	Games played	GS	Games started	MPG	Minutes per game	RPG	Rebounds per game
APG	Assists per game	SPG	Steals per game	BPG	Blocks per game	PPG	Points per game
TO	Turnovers per game	FG%	Field-goal percentage	3P%	3-point field-goal percentage	FT%	Free-throw percentage
**Bold**	Career best	°	League leader

=== Regular season ===
Year	Team	GP	GS	MPG	FG%	3P%	FT%	RPG	APG	SPG	BPG	TO	PPG
2006	Los Angeles	4	0	5.5	.375	.000	.000	1.8	**0.5**	0.3	**0.5**	0.5	1.5
2007	Minnesota	**30**	**14**	**14.6**	**.458**	.000	**.513**	**4.3**	**0.5**	**0.4**	0.4	1.0	**4.3**
2010	Los Angeles	5	0	2.8	.333	.000	.500	0.0	0.0	0.2	0.0	0.4	0.6
Career	3 years, 2 teams	39	14	12.1	.450	.000	.512	3.5	0.4	0.4	0.3	0.8	3.6

=== Playoffs ===
Year	Team	GP	GS	MPG	FG%	3P%	FT%	RPG	APG	SPG	BPG	TO	PPG
2006	Los Angeles	2	0	3.5	.000	.000	.000	0.5	0.5	0.0	0.5	0.0	0.0
Career	1 year, 1 team	2	0	3.5	.000	.000	.000	0.5	0.5	0.0	0.5	0.0	0.0

== North Carolina State statistics ==
Legend
GP	Games played	GS	Games started	MPG	Minutes per game
FG%	Field goal percentage	3P%	3-point field goal percentage	FT%	Free throw percentage
RPG	Rebounds per game	APG	Assists per game	SPG	Steals per game
BPG	Blocks per game	PPG	Points per game	**Bold**	Career high

Year	Team	GP	Points	FG%	3P%	FT%	RPG	APG	SPG	BPG	PPG
2004-05	North Carolina State	29	335	51.0%	0.0%	50.8%	**7.0**	0.9	**1.5**	**1.8**	**11.6**
2005-06	North Carolina State	**30**	**345**	**52.7%**	0.0%	**53.7%**	6.6	**1.1**	1.1	1.6	11.5
Career		59	680	51.8%	0.0%	52.5%	6.8	1.0	1.3	1.7	11.5
