= 2006 Los Angeles Sparks season =

- Head coach: Joe Bryant
- Arena: Staples Center

Results
- Record: 25–9 (.735)
- Place: 1st (Western)
- Playoff finish: Lost Conference Finals (2-0) to Sacramento Monarchs

The 2006 WNBA season was the tenth season for the Los Angeles Sparks. The team went for the best record in the West, but were still unable to return to the WNBA Finals, losing in the conference finals to the Sacramento Monarchs, 2 games to 0.

== Offseason ==
=== Expansion draft ===
Laura Macchi was selected by the Chicago Sky in the Expansion Draft.

== Draft ==
Round	Pick	Player	Position	Nationality	College/Club	Outcome
1	5	Lisa Willis	G	United States	UCLA	Signed rookie contract
2	22	Willnett Crockett	F	United States	Connecticut	Signed rookie contract
3	36	Tiffany Porter-Talbert	G	United States	Western Kentucky	Signed rookie contract

== Regular season ==
=== Season standings ===
Western Conference	W	L	PCT	GB	Home	Road	Conf.
Los Angeles Sparks ^{x}	25	9	.735	–	15–2	10–7	15–5
Sacramento Monarchs ^{x}	21	13	.618	4.0	14–3	7–10	10–10
Houston Comets ^{x}	18	16	.529	7.0	12–5	6–11	11–9
Seattle Storm ^{x}	18	16	.529	7.0	9–8	9–8	10–10
Phoenix Mercury ^{o}	18	16	.529	7.0	10–7	8–9	8–12
San Antonio Silver Stars ^{o}	13	21	.382	12.0	6–11	7–10	10–10
Minnesota Lynx ^{o}	10	24	.294	15.0	8–9	2–15	6–14

=== Season schedule ===
Date	Opponent	Score	Result	Record
May 21	@ Seattle	67-90	Loss	0-1
May 23	@ Charlotte	72-65	Win	1-1
May 25	@ San Antonio	80-71	Win	2-1
May 30	@ Chicago	64-55	Win	3-1
May 31	@ Minnesota	71-114	Loss	3-2
June 3	@ New York	79-89 (OT)	Loss	3-3
June 7	Detroit	86-78	Win	4-3
June 9	Chicago	73-65	Win	5-3
June 13	Phoenix	98-84	Win	6-3
June 17	Connecticut	82-70	Win	7-3
June 18	Sacramento	80-69	Win	8-3
June 21	Houston	75-55	Win	9-3
June 23	@ Sacramento	77-63	Win	10-3
June 25	San Antonio	105-80	Win	11-3
June 28	Seattle	67-75	Loss	11-4
June 30	Phoenix	85-83	Win	12-4
July 1	Washington	80-75	Win	13-4
July 3	San Antonio	63-85	Loss	13-5
July 5	Houston	74-62	Win	14-5
July 7	Indiana	72-60	Win	15-5
July 8	Charlotte	66-64	Win	16-5
July 14	@ Phoenix	95-85	Win	17-5
July 16	@ Minnesota	90-78	Win	18-5
July 18	New York	70-62	Win	19-5
July 21	@ Detroit	59-73	Loss	19-6
July 22	@ Indiana	73-68	Win	20-6
July 25	@ Houston	56-52	Win	21-6
July 26	@ San Antonio	81-67	Win	22-6
July 30	@ Seattle	71-70	Win	23-6
August 1	@ Washington	74-84	Loss	23-7
August 3	@ Connecticut	63-72	Loss	23-8
August 5	@ Phoenix	80-96	Loss	23-9
August 9	Sacramento	69-58	Win	24-9
August 13	Minnesota	78-59	Win	25-9
August 18; 1st Round, G1	@ Seattle	72-84	Loss	0-1
August 20; 1st Round, G2	Seattle	78-70	Win	1-1
August 22; 1st Round, G3	Seattle	68-63	Win	2-1
August 24; West Finals, G1	@ Sacramento	61-64	Loss	2-2
August 26; West Finals, G2	Sacramento	58-72	Loss	2-3

== Player stats ==
Player	GP	REB	AST	STL	BLK	PTS
Lisa Leslie	34	323	108	51	57	680
Chamique Holdsclaw	25	152	56	34	9	375
Mwadi Mabika	32	64	48	19	6	272
Temeka Johnson	32	97	161	47	1	255
Tamara Moore	34	71	65	33	8	206
Murriel Page	34	121	33	17	9	167
Christi Thomas	27	143	26	20	14	164
Jessica Moore	34	98	24	22	9	147
Doneeka Lewis	34	42	66	14	4	131
Lisa Willis	24	43	10	26	0	111
Brandi Davis	14	13	8	5	1	41
Emmiline Ndongue	16	23	2	7	8	18
Tiffany Stansbury	4	7	2	1	2	6
Mfon Udoka	1	3	1	0	0	2
Dalivorka Vilipic	2	2	0	0	1	0
