= Chanel Mokango =

Congolese basketball player (born 1988)

Personal information
- Born: October 13, 1988 (age 38) Kinshasa, Zaire (now Democratic Republic of the Congo)
- Listed height: 6 ft 5 in (1.96 m)

Career information
- College: Southeastern Illinois (2006–2008); Mississippi State (2008–2010)
- WNBA draft: 2010: 1st round, 9th overall pick
- Drafted by: Atlanta Dream
- Playing career: 2010–present
- Position: Power forward

Career history
- 2010: Los Angeles Sparks
- Stats at WNBA.com
- Stats at Basketball Reference

Chanel Modiri Mokango (born October 13, 1988) is a Congolese professional basketball player who plays for Dexia Namur in Belgium and the Tulsa Shock in the WNBA. She was selected 9th in the 2010 WNBA draft by the Atlanta Dream and spent a portion of the 2010 WNBA season playing for the Los Angeles Sparks. At the collegiate level she was a stand out player for the Mississippi State Bulldogs helping to lead that team to the second round of the NCAA Division I tournament in 2009 and the third round (sweet 16) in 2010.

== Career statistics ==
Legend
GP	Games played	GS	Games started	MPG	Minutes per game	RPG	Rebounds per game
APG	Assists per game	SPG	Steals per game	BPG	Blocks per game	PPG	Points per game
TO	Turnovers per game	FG%	Field-goal percentage	3P%	3-point field-goal percentage	FT%	Free-throw percentage
**Bold**	Career best	°	League leader

=== WNBA ===
WNBA regular season statistics
Year	Team	GP	GS	MPG	FG%	3P%	FT%	RPG	APG	SPG	BPG	TO	PPG
2010	Los Angeles	14	0	3.4	.176	.000	.750	0.6	0.0	0.1	0.5	0.2	0.4
**Career**	1 year, 1 team	14	0	3.4	.176	.000	.750	0.6	0.0	0.1	0.5	0.2	0.4

==== Playoffs ====
WNBA playoff statistics
Year	Team	GP	GS	MPG	FG%	3P%	FT%	RPG	APG	SPG	BPG	TO	PPG
2010	Los Angeles	Did not play (coach's decision)											
**Career**	1 year, 1 team	0	0	0.0	—	—	—	—	—	—	—	—	—

=== College statistics ===
NJCAA and NCAA statistics
Year	Team	GP	GS	MPG	FG%	3P%	FT%	RPG	APG	SPG	BPG	TO	PPG
2006–07	Southeastern Illinois College	31			**.565**	**.333**	.767	**11.1**	**0.9**	**1.4**			**14.4**
2007–08	Southeastern Illinois College	**36**			.510	.188	.741	6.9	0.8	1.1			13.8
2008–09	Mississippi State	33		27.8	.438	.256	**.774**	5.8	**0.9**	0.7	**2.9**	1.8	10.5
2009–10	Mississippi State	34	28	30.4	.472	.237	.763	7.2	0.4	0.5	2.4	**1.6**	11.6
**Career**		134	—	—	.499	.238	.760	7.7	0.8	0.9	—	—	12.5
