= Natasha Lacy =

American basketball player (born 1985)

Personal information
- Born: July 8, 1985 (age 41) El Paso, Texas, U.S.
- Listed height: 5 ft 10 in (1.78 m)
- Listed weight: 165 lb (75 kg)

Career information
- High school: Montwood (El Paso, Texas)
- College: TCU (2003–2006); UTEP (2007–2008)
- WNBA draft: 2008: 2nd round, 28th overall pick
- Drafted by: Detroit Shock
- Playing career: 2010–2014
- Position: Guard

Career history
- 2010: Tulsa Shock
- 2011: Los Angeles Sparks
- 2012: Washington Mystics
- 2013: Connecticut Sun
- 2014: New York Liberty

Career highlights
- CUSA All-Defensive Team (2008); CUSA All-Freshman Team (2004)
- Stats at WNBA.com
- Stats at Basketball Reference

Natasha Lacy (born July 8, 1985) is an American professional basketball player who last played for the New York Liberty in the WNBA. Lacy was born in El Paso, Texas, and is the daughter of Austin and Pauline Lacy. She has four older siblings, Curtis, Keota Maryuen, Marcus and Austin. She attended Montwood High School, where she earned three varsity letters. Lacy was rated the ninth best guard and the 23rd best player by All-Star Girls Report. She averaged a triple-double in her senior season with 25 points, 10 rebounds, 10 assists, four steals, and four blocks per game. She was named the El Paso MVP and the district's MVP, and also earned varsity letters in track and field, attending the USA Track and Field Junior Olympics in the 400m.

== College ==
Lacy attended Texas Christian University for her first three years of college, from 2003 to 2006. Lacy sat out the 2006–2007 season as she transferred to University of Texas at El Paso, for her fourth year of eligibility in 2007–2008. During her years at TCU, she ranked 11th in scoring, sixth in rebounding, first in assists, and second in steals. She was the only TCU player to get to 700 points, 500 rebounds, and 400 assists. She had 48 double-digit games, and seven games with scores of 20 or more points. By the end of her college career, she had more than 1,300 points, 750 rebounds, 600 assists, and 300 steals. She finished eighth in the country in steals, and set a single-season record with 108 steals at UTEP for her senior year.

== Professional career ==
Lacy was drafted by the Detroit Shock in 2008 but did not make the team. She did not play in the WNBA 2009 season, but was picked up by the Tulsa Shock for what would be her rookie year in 2010, averaging 6.3 points per game with 3.5 assists, and 2.3 rebounds. She was released by the Tulsa Shock at the end of the 2010 season, and was signed by the Los Angeles Sparks for the 2011 season.

== International career ==
After Lacy was waived by the Detroit Shock in 2008, she went on to have a successful international career. She first went to Greece during the 2008–2009 season to play for K. V. Imperial AEL Limassol as one of their starting five, playing in the EuroCup for 10 games, averaging 11.7 points, 5 rebounds, and 4.5 assists. She then went to Israeli League and played for Maccabi Bnot Ashdod as one of their starting five for three games, where she averaged 15.3 points, 6.7 rebounds, 3 assists, and 1.3 steals per game. For the 2009–2010 season she continued to play for Maccabi Bnot Ashdod in Israel for 23 games, averaging 17.1 points, 7.9 rebounds, 5.6 assists, and 3.3 steals per game. Following her rookie year with the WNBA she returned overseas for the 2010–2011 season to play for Hondarribia-Irun in Spain. There she played 25 games as a starter, averaging 11.2 points, 5.3 rebounds, 3.1 assists, and 2.1 steals per game. Lacy already has a contract to play for Ceyhan Belediyespor in Turkey for the 2011–2012 season.

== Career statistics ==
Legend
| GP | Games played | GS | Games started | MPG | Minutes per game | RPG | Rebounds per game |
| APG | Assists per game | SPG | Steals per game | BPG | Blocks per game | PPG | Points per game |
| TO | Turnovers per game | FG% | Field-goal percentage | 3P% | 3-point field-goal percentage | FT% | Free-throw percentage |
| **Bold** | Career best | ° | League leader |

=== WNBA ===
WNBA regular season statistics
| Year | Team | GP | GS | MPG | FG% | 3P% | FT% | RPG | APG | SPG | BPG | TO | PPG |
|---|---|---|---|---|---|---|---|---|---|---|---|---|---|
| 2008 | Did not play (waived) | | | | | | | | | | | | |
| 2009 | Did not play | | | | | | | | | | | | |
| 2010 | Tulsa | 16 | **3** | **18.3** | 47.5 | 25.0 | 59.5 | 2.3 | **3.5** | **1.4** | 0.2 | 2.4 | **6.3** |
| 2011 | Los Angeles | **29** | 0 | 13.6 | 42.9 | **33.3** | 54.0 | 2.2 | 1.7 | 1.0 | **0.3** | 1.2 | 5.0 |
| 2012 | Washington | 20 | 1 | 13.0 | 35.8 | 23.8 | 77.8 | 2.1 | 1.3 | 0.7 | **0.3** | 1.2 | 3.9 |
| 2013 | Connecticut | 3 | 1 | 16.7 | 11.1 | 0.0 | **100.0** | **5.0** | 2.0 | 1.3 | 0.0 | 1.3 | 2.3 |
| 2014 | New York | 11 | 0 | 7.5 | **50.0** | 0.0 | 37.5 | 0.8 | 0.9 | 1.0 | 0.0 | **0.3** | 1.5 |
| **Career** | 5 years, 5 teams | 79 | 5 | 13.6 | 40.8 | 25.0 | 59.5 | 2.1 | 1.8 | 1.0 | 0.2 | 1.3 | 4.4 |

=== College ===
NCAA statistics
| Year | Team | GP | Points | FG% | 3P% | FT% | RPG | APG | SPG | BPG | PPG |
|---|---|---|---|---|---|---|---|---|---|---|---|
| 2003–04 | TCU | **32** | 224 | **45.2** | 26.2 | 55.2 | 5.5 | 5.2 | 2.7 | 0.3 | 7.0 |
| 2004–05 | TCU | **32** | 304 | 34.2 | **33.3** | 62.1 | 5.8 | **5.8** | 2.8 | 0.3 | 9.5 |
| 2005–06 | TCU | 29 | **417** | 41.4 | 29.8 | 68.1 | **7.4** | 3.9 | 1.7 | **0.7** | **14.4** |
| 2007–08 | UTEP | **32** | 416 | 43.3 | 30.1 | **72.3** | 5.9 | 4.9 | **3.4** | 0.6 | 13.0 |
| **Career** | | 116 | 1688 | 61.1 | 0.0 | 76.0 | 9.1 | 1.4 | 0.9 | 3.2 | 14.6 |
